= Walt Disney Presents: Annette =

- Genre: Children's serial
- Created by: Janette Sebring Lowrey (book)
- Developed by: Lillie Hayward (teleplay)
- Directed by: Charles Lamont
- Starring: Annette Funicello; Sylvia Field; Richard Deacon; Mary Wickes; Tim Considine; David Stollery; Roberta Shore
- Theme music composer: George Bruns
- Opening theme: Jimmie Dodd
- Composers: Paul Smith; William Lava; Buddy Baker
- Country of origin: United States
- Original language: English
- No. of seasons: 1
- No. of episodes: 19

Production
- Executive producer: Walt Disney
- Producer: Bill Walsh

Original release
- Network: ABC, syndicated, Disney Channel
- Release: February 10 – March 7, 1958

Walt Disney Presents: Annette is a television serial that ran on The Mickey Mouse Club during the show's third season (1957–1958). It starred Annette Funicello as Annette McCleod (/məˈklaʊd/ mə-KLOWD), a poor, orphaned country girl who moves into town with her upper-class Uncle Archie and Aunt Lila. The serial also starred Richard Deacon as Archie McCleod, Sylvia Field as Archie's sister Lila McCleod, Mary Wickes as Katie the housekeeper and prolific Disney child stars Tim Considine, David Stollery and Roberta Shore as Annette's friends. The story was adapted by Lillie Hayward (who also worked on Spin and Marty) from the book Margaret by Janette Sebring Lowrey.

Annette was released to DVD in 2008 as part of the Walt Disney Treasures series.

== Synopsis ==
The story is about a recently orphaned country girl, Annette, who moves in with her sophisticated aunt and uncle who live in the city. Most of the plot has to do with her experiences in her new high school trying to fit in with all the new kids she meets in her new community.

However, Laura, the jealous teen, wrongfully accuses Annette of stealing a necklace following a party at her place. Little did she know that the necklace accidentally fell into the piano she played on. Laura and Annette become friends after the misunderstanding.

== Episodes and original airdates (1958) ==
1. "An Introduction" — 2/10
2. "The Newcomer" — 2/11
3. "Annette Meets Jet" — 2/12
4. "An Invitation" — 2/13
5. "The Escort" — 2/14
6. "The Party" — 2/17
7. "Paying The Piper" — 2/18
8. "The Missing Necklace" — 2/19
9. "What Happened At School" — 2/20
10. "Almost A Fight" — 2/21
11. "Steady Gets An Idea" — 2/24
12. "The Explosion" — 2/25
13. "The Turned Down Invitation" — 2/26
14. "Annette Makes A Decision" — 2/27
15. "The Hayride" — 2/28
16. "The Barbecue" — 3/3
17. "The Fight" — 3/4
18. "The Farewell Letter" — 3/5
19. "Mike To The Rescue" — 3/6
20. "The Mystery Is Solved" — 3/7

== Cast ==
- Annette Funicello — Annette McCleod
- Tim Considine — Steve Abernathy
- David Stollery — Mike Martin
- Roberta Shore — Laura Rogan (as Jymme Shore)
- Judy Nugent — Jet Maypen
- Doreen Tracy — Val Abernathy
- Shelley Fabares — Moselle Corey
- Steve Stevens — Drew Stafford
- Rudy Lee — Olmstead "Steady" Ware
- Sharon Baird — Kitty Blalock
- Barry Curtis — Court Whitney
- Tommy Cole — Jimmy Smith
- Cheryl Holdridge — Madge Markham
- Bonnie Lynn Fields — Pat Boren
- Doris Packer — Mrs. Abernathy
- Mary Wickes — Katie
- Richard Deacon — Uncle Archie McCleod
- Sylvia Field — Aunt Lila McCleod
- Ralph Dumke - Mr. Abernathy

== Theme song, plus other songs ==
The theme song "Annette" was written and originally sung by Mickey Mouse Club leader Jimmie Dodd on a 1956 episode of the MMC. A remixed version with special messages from Frankie Avalon, Shelley Fabares, Paul Anka, Tommy Sands and Mickey Mouse was released on the 2-CD boxed set from 1993, Annette: A Musical Reunion with America's Girl Next Door.

Some of the other songs in the serial, include "Reading, Writing, and Rhythm", "Meeting at the Malt Shop", "Don't Jump to Conclusions", and "How Will I Know My Love". The latter song was released as a single, which resulted in Walt Disney signing her to a recording contract on Disneyland Records.

== Merchandising ==
The TV show was also adapted into a comic book by Dan Spiegle, distributed by Dell Comics.
