= Bill Walsh (producer) =

American film producer, screenwriter, and comics author (1913–1975)

- Born: William Crozier Walsh; September 30, 1913; New York City, New York
- Died: January 27, 1975 (aged 61); Los Angeles, California

William Crozier Walsh (September 30, 1913 – January 27, 1975) was a film producer, screenwriter and comics writer who primarily worked on live-action films for Walt Disney Productions.

For his work on Mary Poppins, he shared Academy Award nominations for Best Picture with Walt Disney, and for Best Writing, Screenplay Based on Material from Another Medium with Don DaGradi. He also wrote the Mickey Mouse comic strip for more than two decades.

In 1970 an article in Variety listed him as the second most successful film producer of all time in terms of money-earning movies even though he was "a guy no one's ever heard of".

== Biography ==
=== Early life ===
Walsh was born in 1913 to British immigrant parents in New York City. He was raised in Cincinnati, Ohio by his aunt and uncle, Agnes and William Newman. He played football at Purcell Education and wrote sports for the Cincinnati Commercial Tribune. In 1934 he accepted a University of Cincinnati athletic scholarship.

=== Early career ===
While at UC, Walsh produced a freshman show that happened to be seen by Barbara Stanwyck and Frank Fay who were passing through town in a show, Tattle Tales. They hired Walsh at $12 a week to rewrite the show, which went to Broadway where it ran for five weeks. Walsh then followed Stanwyck and Fay to Hollywood. He worked as a press agent for 15 years at the Ettinger Company and started writing jokes as a sideline on the suggestion of client Edgar Buchanan.

=== Disney comic strips ===
He joined the Disney company in 1943 as a press agent and began writing the Mickey Mouse comic strip as a sideline. "Mickey Mouse was very dull and kind of stupid," Walsh later said. "Donald Duck was the one I liked. He had complete licence. He had pizzaz." Due to Walsh's lack of interest in Mickey as a character, and to his own taste for science fiction, mystery and horror, the stories he wrote for the strip quickly became very different from those of the previous decade. Walsh's storylines could be darker and more violent than in the earlier strips, and introduced various bizarre characters. Notably, Walsh created Eega Beeva, an evolved man from the future who became one the strip's protagonists from 1947 to 1950, effectively replacing Goofy as Mickey's sidekick. Another recurring character created by Walsh is the bird named Ellsworth who appeared as Mickey's sidekick in the strip's Sunday pages where he became a major focus, sometimes stealing the show from Mickey. Walsh continued to write the daily strip for more than 20 years, partnering with artist Floyd Gottfredson on dozens of stories until 1955, when the strip changed formats to become a gag-a-day strip. Walsh continued writing the gag strip until 1964, when he passed it on to Roy Williams.

While at Disney, Walsh also wrote gags for the "Panchito" stories in the Silly Symphony comic strip (1944–45), and created the Uncle Remus and His Tales of Br'er Rabbit Sunday strip (1945–46).

=== Television ===
In the late 1940s, Disney put Walsh in charge of their television operations. He wrote and produced television specials, starting with One Hour in Wonderland (1950).

Walsh produced a number of huge successes, including Davy Crockett (1954–55) and The Mickey Mouse Club (1955–59). He also wrote the feature The Littlest Outlaw (1955) and produced a number of serials that aired as part of The Mickey Mouse Club, including Spin and Marty, Corky and White Shadow, The Hardy Boys: The Mystery of the Applegate Treasure, Adventure in Dairyland, The Adventures of Clint and Mac, and Walt Disney Presents: Annette.

He moved up to features in 1959.

=== Features ===
Walsh wrote and produced The Shaggy Dog (1959) with Fred MacMurray, Tommy Kirk and Kevin Corcoran. A fantasy comedy made for relatively smaller money, it was a huge hit and became the most profitable Disney film of all time. The same team then made Toby Tyler (1959), a circus film that was well received critically though never as popular.

Walsh wrote and produced a series of comedies starring MacMurray and Kirk, all very popular: The Absent-Minded Professor (1961), a fantasy; Bon Voyage! (1962), an Americans-abroad family comedy, also with Corcoran; and Son of Flubber (1963), a sequel to Absent Minded Professor. He provided the story for The Misadventures of Merlin Jones (1964), a fantasy comedy with Kirk. Kirk called him "the resident genius" at the studio.

Walsh co-wrote the musical Mary Poppins (1964) which became the most popular movie Disney ever released. He wrote it with Don DaGradi who would be Walsh's most regular collaborator - Walsh normally worked with a co-writer, or supervised other writers.

Walsh wrote and produced That Darn Cat! (1965), Lt. Robin Crusoe, U.S.N. (1966) and Blackbeard's Ghost (1968).

=== Post-Walt Disney ===
After Walt Disney's death in 1966 Walsh was part of the seven man committee who ran the company.

He wrote and produced The Love Bug which was a huge success.

In 1970, Walsh said "I make movies for people between the ages of nine and fourteen. It's a very intelligent and very honest audience... Also I don't make personal statements; I make movies hoping they'll make money so I'll be able to make more movies. I'm a schlock hack and I glory in it. My folks had a tent show and if you tried to make personal statements for audiences in Kentucky and Tennessee they'd burn the tent down." He said he did not want to direct because "I have flat feet... you have to get up too early" and "you have to talk to actors."

He wrote and produced Scandalous John (1971) which he said was his favourite film even though it was the only one to have lost money. Far more popular was Bedknobs and Broomsticks (1971).

In 1971, Walsh said his main contributions to the films were "fantasy... I have nutty ideas which any other studio would throw me the hell on the street for but which are very compatible here".

His later films included The World's Greatest Athlete (1973), Herbie Rides Again (1974) and One of Our Dinosaurs Is Missing (1975).

Walsh died of a heart attack in Los Angeles in 1975, and was interred in Glendale's Forest Lawn Memorial Park Cemetery.

== Bibliography ==
Walsh scripted the Mickey Mouse daily comic strip drawn by Floyd Gottfredson from 1944 until 1964. One of the serialized stories Walsh wrote in 1944 (before the strip became gag-a-day) was reprinted by Gladstone Publishing in 1989:

- Mickey Mouse and the World of Tomorrow (Gladstone Comic Album #17, Gladstone, August 1989)

== Filmography ==
- One Hour in Wonderland (1950) (TV special) - writer, producer
- The Walt Disney Christmas Show (1951) (TV special) - producer
- The Disneyland Story (1954) (TV special) - writer, producer
- Davy Crockett (1954–55) (mini series) - producer
- The Littlest Outlaw (1955) - writer
- The Adventures of Spin and Marty (1955) (TV series) - producer
- Davy Crockett: King of the Wild Frontier (1955) - producer
- The Mickey Mouse Club (1955–56) (TV series) - producer
- Corky and White Shadow (1956) (TV series) - producer
- The Hardy Boys: The Mystery of the Applegate Treasure (1956) (TV series) - producer
- Adventure in Dairyland (1956) (TV series) - producer
- Further Adventures of Spin and Marty (1956) (TV series) - producer
- Davy Crockett and the River Pirates (1956) - producer
- Westward Ho, the Wagons! (1956) - associate producer
- The Fourth Anniversary Show (1957) (TV special) - producer
- The Hardy Boys: The Mystery of the Ghost Farm (1957) (TV series) - producer
- The Adventures of Clint and Mac (1957) (TV series) - producer
- Annette (1958) (TV series) - producer
- Disneyland '59 (1959) (TV special) - producer
- The Shaggy Dog (1959) - writer, associate producer
- Toby Tyler or Ten Weeks with a Circus (1960) - writer, producer
- The Absent Minded Professor (1961) - writer, associate producer
- Bon Voyage! (1962) - writer, associate producer
- Son of Flubber (1963) - writer, co producer
- The Misadventures of Merlin Jones (1964) - story
- Mary Poppins (1964) - writer, co-producer
- That Darn Cat! (1965) - writer, co-producer
- Lt. Robin Crusoe, U.S.N. (1966) - writer, co-producer
- Blackbeard's Ghost (1968) - writer, co producer
- The Love Bug (1969) - writer, producer
- Scandalous John (1971) - writer, producer
- Bedknobs and Broomsticks (1971) - writer, producer
- The Grand Opening of Walt Disney World (1971) (TV special) - writer, executive producer
- The World's Greatest Athlete (1973) - producer
- Herbie Rides Again (1974) - writer, producer
- One of Our Dinosaurs Is Missing (1975) - writer, producer
