= The Shaggy Dog (1959 film) =

American film directed by Charles Barton

- Theatrical release poster
- Directed by: Charles Barton
- Screenplay by: Lillie Hayward; Bill Walsh
- Based on: The Hound of Florence by Felix Salten
- Produced by: Walt Disney; Bill Walsh
- Starring: Fred MacMurray; Jean Hagen; Tommy Kirk; Annette Funicello; Cecil Kellaway; Alexander Scourby; James Westerfield; Jacques Aubuchon
- Narrated by: Paul Frees
- Cinematography: Edward Colman
- Edited by: James Ballas
- Music by: Paul J. Smith
- Production company: Walt Disney Productions
- Distributed by: Buena Vista Distribution
- Release date: March 19, 1959
- Running time: 104 minutes
- Country: United States
- Language: English
- Budget: under $1 million or $1,250,000
- Box office: $12.3 million (US and Canada rentals)

The Shaggy Dog is a 1959 American fantasy comedy film produced by Walt Disney Productions and loosely based on the 1923 novel The Hound of Florence by Felix Salten. Directed by Charles Barton from a screenplay by Lillie Hayward and Bill Walsh, the film stars Fred MacMurray, Tommy Kirk, Jean Hagen, Kevin Corcoran, Tim Considine, Roberta Shore, and Annette Funicello. The film follows a teenage boy named Wilby Daniels who, by the power of an enchanted ring of the Borgias, is transformed into a shaggy Old English Sheepdog.

The film was released on March 19, 1959, and grossed over $9 million during its initial release, making it the second-highest-grossing film of 1959. Its success led to a franchise of further films, beginning with the 1976 sequel The Shaggy D.A.. There followed a 1987 television sequel, a 1994 television remake and a 2006 theatrical live-action remake.

== Plot ==
Wilbur "Wilby" Daniels is a boy who creates often dangerous inventions. As a retired mailman who often ran afoul of canines, Wilby's father Wilson hates dogs, and cannot understand why his younger son, Montgomery "Moochie" Daniels, wants one.

Wilby and his rival Buzz Miller go with French girl Francesca Andrassy to a museum. Buzz and Francesca eventually leave without Wilby. He later encounters Professor Plumcutt, whose newspaper Wilby used to deliver. Plumcutt mentions mystical ancient beliefs, including the legend of the Borgia family, who used shape-shifting as a weapon against their enemies.

Wilby later collides with a table that holds a display case of jewelry. He accidentally ends up with one of the rings in the cuff of his pants. It is the cursed Borgia ring, and after reading the inscription on it ("In canis corpore transmuto", which, unknown to Wilby, means, "Into a dog's body I change"), he transforms into Chiffon, Francesca's Old English Sheepdog. Confused, Wilby, as a dog, goes to Plumcutt, who says that the Borgia curse can only be broken through a heroic act of selflessness. After getting chased out of his own house by an enraged Wilson, who fails to recognize him as a dog, Wilby continues to switch back and forth between human form and dog form. Only Moochie and Plumcutt know his true identity, as Wilby has spoken to them both in dog form.

Francesca sees that Chiffon has been acting strangely. She asks her adoptive father, Dr. Andrassy, to watch over Chiffon for the night. Wilby, as a dog, eventually overhears Dr. Valasky and his associate Thurm discuss plans to steal a government secret.

The next day, Wilby, as a dog, tells Moochie about the spies. Wilby reveals the secret to his dumbfounded father. As Wilby and Moochie discuss what to do next, Francesca's butler Stefano drags Wilby into the house. Moochie runs to his father to get help, who goes to the authorities, until Wilson finds himself accused of being either crazy or a spy.

Stefano and Andrassy later discuss plans to steal a government secret, and Wilby, as a dog, overhears. He however transforms into human Wilby in front of the spies and is discovered, but not before he hears Andrassy expressing his wish to get rid of Francesca.

The spies force Francesca to leave with them, leaving the human Wilby bound and gagged in the closet. Moochie sneaks into the house and discovers Wilby, who has once again transformed into a dog.

When Buzz appears at the residence to take Francesca on a date, Wilby, still in his dog form, steals Buzz's hot rod automobile. Buzz reports this to officers Hansen and Kelly, who report the suspect as a "large shaggy dog" This is sighted by two policemen who decide to aid Kelly and Hansen. Wilson and Moochie follow Buzz and the police, who end up chasing everyone. The spies attempt to leave aboard a boat, but the police call in the water police to apprehend Andrassy and stop his boat. Wilby, in his dog form, swims up and wrestles with the men, as Francesca gets knocked out of the boat. Wilby drags her to shore, where Buzz tries to take credit for her rescue. This angers Wilby, who still a dog, attacks Buzz. Wilby's snarling turns into a tirade as Wilby finds himself wrestling with Buzz. Francesca awakens to see a wet Chiffon and hugs it, thinking that he was her rescuer. Noticing that he and Chiffon are seen together, Wilby realizes that he has broken the curse.

Now that Wilson and Chiffon are declared heroes, Francesca can leave for Paris without Andrassy and Stefano, both of whom are arrested for espionage, and she gives Chiffon to the Daniels family as her way of thanking them. Since Wilson has gotten such commendation for foiling a spy ring because of "his love of dogs", he stops hating dogs and allows Moochie to care for Chiffon. Wilby and Buzz decide to forget their rivalry over Francesca and resume their friendship. Allison later gets a kind of revenge on Buzz and Wilby for being ignored in favor of Francesca.

== Cast ==
- Tommy Kirk as Wilbur "Wilby" Daniels / The Shaggy Dog
- Fred MacMurray as Wilson Daniels
- Jean Hagen as Freeda Daniels
- Annette Funicello as Allison D'Allessio
- Tim Considine as Buzz Miller
- Kevin Corcoran as Montgomery "Moochie" Daniels
- Cecil Kellaway as Professor Plumcutt
- Alexander Scourby as Dr. Mikhail Andrassy
- Roberta Shore as Francesca Andrassy
- James Westerfield as Officer Johnny Hansen
- Strother Martin as Thurm
- Forrest Lewis as Officer Kelly
- Ned Wever as Security Agent E.P. Hackett
- Gordon Jones as Captain Scanlon
- Jacques Aubuchon as Stefano
- Paul Frees as Narrator and Dr. J.W. Galvin, The Psychiatrist (uncredited)
- Sam, An Old English Sheepdog as Chiffon The Shaggy Dog, a Bratislavian Sheepdog

== Production ==
=== Development ===
Walt Disney had previously bought the rights to Felix Salten's 1923 novel Bambi, a Life in the Woods and produced an adaptation of it in 1942 under his animation department. Prior to that film's release, Walt Disney bought the rights to five more Salten novels in May 1941, as well as options to have him adapt them. The novels were Bambi's Children, Perri, Renni, City Jungle, and The Hound of Florence. He did not want to make Bambi's Children but did not want anyone else to make it, but he intended to make the other films as cartoons. Salten was then living in Switzerland and was paid out of funds owing to Disney's then-distributor RKO Radio Pictures which had been "frozen" in that country; this would be credited against money RKO owed Disney for distributing his films. Salten died in Zurich in 1945.

In June 1955, when Disney had released Lady and the Tramp, he said he still had no plans to film The Hound of Florence. However, ABC wanted Disney to make another TV series, and he pitched them The Shaggy Dog, "a story that treated the younger generation and its problems in a light manner. They turned me down flat. I was hopping mad when I went back to the studio, so I called in Bill Walsh and said 'Let's make a feature of it.'" Star Tommy Kirk later claimed the film was meant to be a two-part television show and "only at the very last minute did they decide to splice them together and release them as a film."

In the late 1950s, the idea of an adult human turning into a beast was nothing new, but the idea of a teenager doing just that in a film was considered avant-garde and even shocking in 1957 when American International Pictures released their horror film, I Was a Teenage Werewolf, one of the studio's biggest hits. The Shaggy Dog betrays its successful forebear with Fred MacMurray's classic bit of dialogue: "That's ridiculous—my son is not a werewolf! He's nothing more than just a big, baggy, stupid-looking shaggy dog!"

The director was Charles Barton, who also directed Spin and Marty for The Mickey Mouse Club. Veteran screenwriter Lillie Hayward also worked on the Spin and Marty serials, which featured several of the same young actors as The Shaggy Dog. Disney producer Bill Walsh mused that "The Shaggy Dog" was the direct inspiration for the TV show My Three Sons, and Walsh said "Same kids, same dog and Fred MacMurray!"

=== Casting ===
The lead role went to Tommy Kirk, who had started with Disney in a Hardy Boys serial for The Mickey Mouse Club alongside Tim Considine. Considine also played a role, as did Annette Funicello who had been the most popular member of The Mickey Mouse Club. It was Funicello's first film.

It took several months for Disney to find the right dog.

Kirk later said: "At the time, I viewed it as a fairy tale, but in later years, I've come to think that the film has one of the screwiest combinations of plot elements in any movie ever made. It has all the realistic elements of the Cold War -- Russian spies plotting against the government -- mixed in with a rivalry over Annette between two teenage boys, mixed in with a fantasy about a boy who turns into a dog because he encounters a ring from the Borgias!"

=== Filming ===
Filming started on August 4, 1958. Disney later recalled that "nobody — not even on the lot — paid any attention to us. We made the picture for one and a quarter million dollars while the rest of the town was turning out super dupers."

Tim Considine was clawed in the eye by the sheepdog during filming.

Dialogue would be written to match the mouth movements of the dog. If the dog did not move its mouth, beef jerky was used.

Kirk said he had "beautiful memories of" Barton, "as he was a very gentle, nice person with a good sense of humor". He also enjoyed working with MacMurray:

I thought he was a great actor. I liked him enormously. I tried to get to know him, and got to know him a little bit, but he did have a kind of wall that I never got around. He was distant, he was conservative, and kind of remote. He didn't go out and have lunch. Instead, he had a tiny can of Metrecal — a horrible diet drink. There were stories about him being cheap, and I heard that he was worth $500 million at the time of his death. But I just loved him. They say he was Walt Disney's favorite actor, and I can understand that. He ranks up there with Cary Grant as one of the great light comics.

Veteran Disney voice actor Paul Frees had a rare on-screen appearance in the film — for which he received no on-screen credit — as Dr. J.W. Galvin, a psychiatrist who examines Wilby's father (MacMurray), Wilson Daniels. Frees also did his usual voice acting by also playing the part of the narrator who informs the audience that Wilson Daniels is a "man noted for the fact that he is allergic to dogs".

== Reception ==
The Shaggy Dog was the second-highest-grossing film of 1959 and was Disney's most financially successful film of the 1950s. During its initial release, the film grossed $9.6 million in domestic theatrical rentals on a budget of less than $1 million, making it more profitable than the year's highest-grossing film, Ben-Hur. The Shaggy Dog also performed very strongly on a 1967 re-release. The film was the most profitable film made by Disney at that time.

According to Diabolique, "the movie kicked off a whole bunch of comedies with a slight fantastical element that powered Disney film division for the next two decades. Much of the credit went to MacMurray; a lot of the credit should have gone to Kirk, whose easy-going boy next door charm made him the ideal American teen".

On review aggregator Rotten Tomatoes, the film holds a 70% approval rating with an average rating of 5.8/10, based on 20 reviews. On Metacritic, the film has a weighted average score of 45 out of 100 based on 6 critics, indicating "mixed or average reviews".

== Novelization ==
While the film is based on Salten's The Hound of Florence, a novelization of the film published by Scholastic eight years later in 1967 made some changes to the plot. First, Funicello's character Allison was removed entirely, and her name is not listed among the movie's principal performers. As a result, the rivalry between Wilby and Buzz is greatly reduced. Also, Dr. Valasky is changed into Francesca's uncle, not her adoptive father.

A comic book adaptation also appeared from Western Publishing, which followed the film's storyline more closely. This was reprinted in 1978 as a companion story to an adaptation of The Cat from Outer Space.

== Legacy ==
The Shaggy Dog was at that time the most profitable film produced by Walt Disney Productions, which influenced the studio's follow-up live-action film production. Using a formula of placing supernatural and/or fantastical forces within everyday mid-twentieth century American life, the studio created a series of "gimmick comedies" (a term used by Disney historian and film critic Leonard Maltin) with action to keep children entertained and some light satire to amuse the adult audience. Using television actors on their summer hiatus who were familiar to audiences but did not necessarily have enough clout to receive over-the-title billing (or a large fee) from another major studio was one way these comedies were produced inexpensively. They also tended to use the same sets from the Disney backlot repeatedly. This allowed Walt Disney Productions a low-risk scenario for production. Any of these films could easily make back its investment just from moderate matinee attendance in neighborhood theatres and could also be packaged on the successful Disney anthology television series The Wonderful World of Disney.

The popular television series My Three Sons (1960–1972) reunited MacMurray and Considine, and also features a pet shaggy sheepdog named "Tramp".

=== Sequels ===
- The film was followed in 1976 with a theatrical sequel, The Shaggy D.A., starring Dean Jones as a 45-year-old Wilby Daniels.
- In 1987, a two-part television movie set somewhere in the 17 years between the events portrayed in The Shaggy Dog and The Shaggy D.A., entitled The Return of the Shaggy Dog, presented a post–Saturday Night Live Gary Kroeger as a 30-something Wilby Daniels.

=== Remakes ===
- In 1994, the first remake of the film was a television movie, with Disney regular Scott Weinger as a teenaged Wilbert "Wilby" Joseph Daniels, and Ed Begley Jr. playing a part similar to the one originated by Fred MacMurray in 1959.
- In 2006, Disney released a live-action remake of the film with Tim Allen as a 50-something Dave Douglas. This film has an entirely different story, characters, and transformation plot device unrelated to the original trilogy. To tie-in with the theatrical release of the 2006 remake, the original 1959 film was re-issued in the United States as a special DVD labeled The Wild & Woolly Edition, which featured the film in two forms: one in the original black and white, the other a colorized version. The colorized version however is not restored and suffers from age. In the UK, the 1959 film has only ever been made available on DVD in black and white. The 2006 remake and Tim Allen's performance was poorly received by critics and fans of the 1959 original and 1994 remake, with a moderately successful box office return.

== See also ==
- The Shaggy D.A., the 1976 theatrical sequel
- The Return of the Shaggy Dog, the 1987 television sequel
- Felix Salten, the author of The Hound of Florence, the source material for the 1959 live-action film
