= The New Adventures of Spin and Marty: Suspect Behavior =

- Film Poster
- Directed by: Rusty Cundieff
- Written by: David Simkins (Teleplay); Paul Zindel (Novel)
- Produced by: Salli Newman (Executive Producer)
- Starring: David Gallagher; Jeremy Foley; Charles Shaughnessy; Yancy Butler; Judd Nelson
- Cinematography: Robert McLachlan
- Edited by: Scott Vickrey
- Music by: Craig Safan
- Production companies: Firebrand Productions; Pacific Motion Pictures; Buena Vista Television
- Distributed by: ABC (USA) (TV) (Original Airing); Disney-ABC Domestic Television
- Release date: August 13, 2000; (USA)
- Running time: 88 min.
- Country: United States
- Language: English

The New Adventures of Spin and Marty: Suspect Behavior is a 2000 television film, starring David Gallagher and Jeremy Foley. It was written by David Simkins and directed by Rusty Cundieff. The film is part of Disney's anthology The Wonderful World of Disney, that included several movies and animations produced and released by the studio from 1995 to 2005. It was based on the novel "The Undertaker's Gone Bananas" by Paul Zindel and is an updated version of the eponymous characters from the 1950s popular series Spin and Marty. The New Adventures of Spin and Marty was aired by ABC on August 13, 2000.

== Plot ==
Marty, a rich boy helps his friend Spin to investigate his suspicious neighbors.

== Cast ==
- David Gallagher as Marty Markham
- Jeremy Foley as Spin Evans
- Charles Shaughnessy as Jordan Welsh
- Yancy Butler as Veronica Hulka
- Judd Nelson as Jack Hulka
