= Adventure in Dairyland =

- Genre: Children's program
- Directed by: William Beaudine, Sr.
- Starring: Annette Funicello; Sammy Ogg; Kevin Corcoran; Herb Newcombe; Fern Persons; Glen Graber; Mary Lu Delmonte
- Country of origin: United States
- Original language: English
- No. of episodes: 8

Production
- Producer: Bill Walsh
- Production locations: Burbank, California; Verona, Wisconsin; Madison, Wisconsin
- Cinematography: Walter Castle
- Production company: Walt Disney Productions

Original release
- Network: ABC
- Release: November 5 – December 24, 1956

Adventure in Dairyland is a television serial that aired in 1956 on ABC as part of the second season of The Mickey Mouse Club. The serial starred Mouseketeer Annette Funicello and Sammy Ogg of Spin and Marty, and featured Kevin Corcoran in his first Walt Disney production.

== Plot ==
Annette Funicello and Sammy Ogg visit the 560-acre McCandless Sunny Acres Dairy Farm in Wisconsin. They get to know the members of the McCandless family and learn about the operation of a dairy farm.

== Production ==
The serial was filmed at the Sisk Farm on Sugar River Road in Verona, Wisconsin.

== Tie-in ==
The serial was produced in co-operation with the American Dairy Association who published a 16-page paper pamphlet that presented material from the serial.
