= Jackson Gillis =

American radio and television scriptwriter (1916–2010)

Jackson Clark Gillis (August 21, 1916 – August 19, 2010) was an American radio and television scriptwriter whose career spanned more than 40 years and encompassed a wide range of genres.

Gillis was born in Kalama, Washington to a highway engineer and a piano teacher. His family moved to California when he was a teenager. He attended California State University, Fresno, but transferred to Stanford University, where he earned his undergraduate degree in English in 1938. He worked in England after graduating from college. After returning to the United States, he performed with the Barter Theatre in Virginia, together with Gregory Peck. George Bernard Shaw attended a performance of one of his plays, in which Gillis acted. Gillis received a note from Shaw that critiqued his exit, a postcard Gillis retained for decades. He enlisted in the United States Army and worked as an intelligence officer during World War II in the Pacific Theater.

After completing his military service, Gillis moved to Los Angeles and took a job writing for radio shows, including the dramas The Whistler and Let George Do It. He moved into television scriptwriting and earned his first credit — for an episode of Racket Squad, a series that starred Reed Hadley — in 1952. He wrote for The Adventures of Superman from 1953 to 1957 and also spent several years writing for Perry Mason and Lassie. His scriptwriting was prolific and varied, and over the years, he worked on shows such as Lost in Space, Hawaii Five-O, and Knight Rider. He wrote for the series Columbo, starring Peter Falk, from 1971 to 1992. He also wrote a pair of detective novels, The Killers of Starfish and Chainsaw.

After retiring from Hollywood in the 1990s, Gillis and his wife moved to Moscow, Idaho, to be near their daughter. Years after retiring, he received one last writing credit for the Lois & Clark: The New Adventures of Superman episode "All Shook Up", due to that episode being a remake of the Adventures of Superman episode "Panic in the Sky". Gillis was married to the former Patricia Cassidy, a fellow actor whom he met during his brief acting career at the Barter Theatre, until her death in 2003. He died at age 93 on August 19, 2010, of pneumonia in Moscow, Idaho. His daughter recalled that her father watched little on television other than football, as "he thought most of what was on TV was junk".

== Screenwriting ==
=== Television ===
- Front Page Detective (1951)
- Chevron Theatre (1952)
- Racket Squad (1952)
- I'm the Law (1953)
- Adventures of Superman (1953–1956)
- Passport to Danger (1954)
- Lassie (1954–1960)
- The Millionaire (1955)
- Spin and Marty (1955)
- The Hardy Boys: The Mystery of the Applegate Treasure (1956)
- The Hardy Boys: The Mystery of Ghost Farm (1957)
- Zorro (1957)
- Sugarfoot (1958)
- Bronco (1959)
- Perry Mason (1959–1965)
- The Four Just Men (1960)
- Dr. Kildare (1965)
- Lost in Space (1965–1968)
- The Fugitive (1966)
- The Man from U.N.C.L.E. (1966)
- Jericho (1966)
- I Spy (1966–1968)
- The Wild Wild West (1968)
- Mannix (1968)
- The Mod Squad (1968)
- Bonanza (1969)
- Ironside (1969)
- My Friend Tony (1969)
- Land of the Giants (1969)
- Mission: Impossible (1970–1972)
- Hawaii Five-O (1971)
- Cade's County (1971)
- Medical Center (1971–1972)
- Columbo (1971–1992)
- O'Hara, U.S. Treasury (1972)
- Longstreet (1972)
- The F.B.I. (1973)
- Barnaby Jones (1974)
- The Snoop Sisters (1974)
- Cannon (1974)
- Caribe (1975)
- Police Woman (1978)
- Starsky and Hutch (1978)
- Wonder Woman (1978–1979)
- Big Shamus, Little Shamus (1979)
- Jason of Star Command (1979)
- Paris (1980)
- The Chisholms (1980)
- Code Red (1981–1982)
- Knight Rider (1983–1986)
- Murder, She Wrote (1985–1986)
- Lois & Clark: The New Adventures of Superman (1994)

=== Films ===
- Stamp Day for Superman (1954)
- Assault on the Wayne (1971)
- The Man Who Died Twice (1973)
- Time Travelers (1976)
- A Stoning in Fulham County (1988)
