= Sam the Shaggy Dog =

American actor, Old English Sheepdog

- Born: Lillybrad's Sammy's Shadow; October 21, 1956; Denver, U.S.
- Occupations: Actor; film; television
- Years active: 1959-1960

Sam (registered name Lillybrad's Sammy's Shadow; born 21 October 1956) was an American Old English Sheepdog and animal actor best known for portraying Chiffon in Walt Disney's 1959 film The Shaggy Dog. He later appeared on television and received a PATSY Award for his performance in the film.

== Early life and training ==
Born to Norval Pride King and Lillibrad Lindy Lou on October 21, 1956 in Denver, Colorado, Sam's kennel name was Lillybrad's Sammy's Shadow and was bought for $500 by Mrs. Billye Anderson, a clerk for the California State Division of Highways in San Bernardino, when he was two months old.

By the time he was four months old, Anderson enrolled Sam in an obedience class in San Bernardino, California run by William Koehler, head animal trainer at Walt Disney Studios since 1939. Koehler ended up training animals for the studio's live-action films and popular anthology television series for NBC, Walt Disney's Wonderful World of Color, for more than 20 years. After putting Sam through nine weeks of training, Koehler was impressed and ultimately was responsible for discovering him. Almost a year later, when he learned Walt Disney Studio was looking for a sheepdog to star in its next film, Koehler was certain Sam was right for the part and contacted the studio to audition Sam for the role.

== Career ==
=== The Shaggy Dog ===
The hairy-eyed, mop-pawed Sam with his lopsided grin was picked out of the more than 20 Old English Sheepdogs who auditioned. The studio signed him to an exclusive contract after none of other dogs exhibited the right temperament to play the character, Chiffon, a Bratislavian Sheepdog, in the film production of The Shaggy Dog, directed by Charles Barton, who also directed the Spin and Marty serials for the studio's The Mickey Mouse Club.

After filming started on August 4, 1958, Sam showcased his versatility as a beloved canine character right away. Originally it was planned for Sam to do the principal work in the film with others used as doubles to perform specialized actions in the upcoming comedy feature. It turned out, however, that Sam was so skilled he ended up "doing just about everything, including the scene where he is racing down the road in a hot road. A studio prop man installed a special bucket seat designed for Sam to sit comfortably in the car, along with hair-covered mittens tied to the steering wheel for him to slide his paws into, and a seatbelt covered with hair to secure him. Since Sam couldn't actually drive the car, director Charles Barton used a stuntman, hidden from sight in the rigged up car. When the stuntman turned his steering wheel, Sam's wheel would turn simultaneously, making it look like Sam was moving the wheel and driving the hot rod in the scenes filmed for the movie.

The cast and crew loved working with Sam. According to Fred MacMurray, who played the father of the household, Wilson Daniels, "Shaggy kept the whole cast and crew in stitches. He even broke me up a couple of times, and for an actor, believe me, that's no laughing matter. I knew I had to give everything I had to keep him from walking away with the picture. It wouldn't have been so bad if he'd been just a trick dog. I tell you he's an actor. I never saw any amateur catch on to the business so fast as this one did. He's a natural screen personality."

In March 1959, The Shaggy Dog was released to theaters and was more profitable than the screen epic, Ben-Hur which opened that same year. The live-action comedy feature went on to become the second-highest-grossing film of 1959, grossing $9.6 million in box-office revenue on a budget of less than $1 million, and Disney's most financially successful movie of the 1950s.

=== Recordings and promotion ===
Walt Disney produced under its Disneyland Records label two record discs released the same month as the movie. The first was Shaggy Dog, a 33 RPM LP (WDL-3044, $3.98), complete with a 16-page booklet including black-and-white photos from the movie, The Life and Times of a Shaggy Dog, written by Sam, the Shaggy Dog (with help from an unknown ghost writer). Members of film's cast included on the record are Fred MacMurray, Roberta Shore, Kevin Corcoran, The Toy Poodles, Four Dachshunds, The Hound Dogs, and Sam, the Shaggy Dog (voiced by Paul Frees in his Disneyland Records debut). On the album Shaggy sings, plays the saxophone with guest saxophonist Fred MacMurray, narrates and tell jokes (with voice provided by Paul Frees).

Ten song favorites featured on the 12-inch platter were "Did Your Ever Hear a Dog Talking," sung by Sam and The Toy Poodles; "Estrellita," performed by Sam with a saxophone solo by MacMurray; and "Dog-Gone It, It's a Dog!" sung by Sam and The Toy Poodles. Other cuts recorded and sung by Sam (with the voice of Paul Frees) were "Flat Foot Floogie" and "Shaggy Dog Cha Cha Cha." Along with Roberta Shore, Kevin Corcoran, The Toy Poodles, and The Hound Dogs, Sam performed the last song on the album, "Finale." Four other tunes were performed by other artists on the album: The Four Dachshunds, "Shaggy Dog Shag" and The Hound Dogs, "Sweet Adeline," with Sam's film co-star Roberta Shore doing the remaining two: "C'est Chiffon" and "Shaggy Dog."

In April, Sam as "Shaggy" made the rounds of the radio circuit in Los Angeles to promote the Disneyland Records album delivering copies of it in person to the top deejays in the market during their morning and daytime shows. They included Barry Kaye, Biff Collie, and Ron McCoy of KLAC, Dick Whittinghill, early morning DJ at KMPC, Bob Crane of KNX, and John Trotter and Roger Carroll, also of KMPC hired that same year as a disc jockey.

That same month, Valley Times "HI Fi" columnist Larry Paulsen wrote in his review of the record following Sam personally delivering a copy of it to him at the newspapers Van Nuys, California offices: "If you don't think a dog can't do these things, you haven't seen the movie."

The album received high praised from other critics. As Gerald M. Healy wrote in his June 1959 "Wax Works" column for The Morning Union newspaper: "For those of you who were fortunate enough to see Walt Disney's motion picture 'The Shaggy Dog,' you now have a fine opportunity to capture the sound and surprise your children. This is one of those excellent 'rainy day albums'—something to amuse the little ones—as well as yourself."

Disneyland Records cut and pressed a 7-inch 45 RPM single of "Shaggy Dog" and "C'est Chiffon" issued simultaneously with the album, entitled Shaggy Dog (Disneyland F-123), featuring a full color photo of them on the cover with the title cut, "Shaggy Dog," sung by both of them (with vocals by Sam provided by Paul Frees).

Beyond the Disneyland album and single, Walt Disney Studio marketed Sam's name and likeness on other products associated with the film's release, among them a ten cent Dell comic book featuring a page of autographs from the cast including Sam's paw print for his signature, and full-color Little Golden Book, both based on the movie and published in 1959.

=== Television and other appearances ===
Resulting from his appearance in Disney's hit movie, Sam won guests spots on two popular television series by special arrangements with Walt Disney Studios, The Plymouth Show, an hour-long musical program hosted by Big Band leader Lawrence Welk, and The Gale Storm Show, a half-hour situation comedy starring actress-singer Gale Storm.

During his appearance on ABC's Wednesday night, April 1, 1959 broadcast of Welk's program, Sam (billed as "Sam, the Shaggy Dog") was joined sixteen-year-old Roberta Shore to sing the title song from the movie and LP, "The Shaggy Dog." Sam mouthed the lyrics of the song with performance simulated by an invisible wire attached to his lips. Also appearing on the show were the Lennon Sisters and Larry Dean performing the production number, "Sav-a-Penny Super Store."

In his October 15, 1959 guest appearance on CBS's telecast of Storm's program, entitled "The Million Dollar Mutt," Sam, playing himself (as "Walt Disney's Shaggy Dog Sam"), hops a ride in Storm's and co-star ZaSu Pitts' taxicab after walking out on the paw-printing ceremonies at Hollywood's famous Grauman's Chinese Theater. Thinking he is just "another mutt," they smuggle him aboard the Ocean Queen for whom Storm is the cruise director not knowing who he is to the discomfort of the ship's captain, Captain Huxley (Roy Roberts) who is allergic to dogs, especially shaggy ones.

That summer, on Saturday, July 4, 1959, Sam thrilled more than 75,000 people in attendance with his appearance at the 27th Annual American Legion Fourth of July Show at the Los Angeles Coliseum. The theme of the show was "A Salute to Japan" and Vice President Richard M. Nixon and Consul Consul Yukio Mishima of Japan were among the honored guests.

In January 1960, Sam appeared in the 27-minute full Technicolor documentary featurette released to Disney-owned theaters, Gala Day at Disneyland. The film highlighted new attractions added at Disneyland in the summer of 1959, including the Disneyland Monorail System, Submarine Voyage and Matterhorn Bobsleds with clips of the master showman Walt Disney from the dedication ceremonies It also contained footage of the Disneyland ‘59 parade down Main Street U.S.A. and famous personalities who participated, including Sam and fellow Shaggy Dog cast members Fred MacMurray and Annette Funicello, as well Walt Disney, Guy Williams of Disney's Zorro television series fame, and then-Vice President Richard M. Nixon, among others.

== Recognition ==
Three months later, on Tuesday night, April 12, 1960, Sam, under the name of "Shaggy" in reference to the title character he played in Walt Disney's The Shaggy Dog, was honored as best "Picture Animal Top Star of the Year" with the 1960 PATSY at the American Humane Association's 10th Annual PATSY Awards. Asta the dog won a PATSY as best "Performing Television Star of the Year" for his work on M-G-M's The Thin Man television series that same year. Sam (Shaggy) and Asta accepted their animal Oscars at CBS-Television City in Hollywood during filming of the daytime CBS variety program hosted by Los Angeles TV personality Red Rowe, The Red Rowe Show, broadcast on Wednesday, April 13, 1960 on CBS affiliates across the country. In addition to receiving his award, Sam's paw prints were immortalized in wet cement at the PATSY Award Animal Walk of Fame located in the courtyard in front of the Burbank Animal Shelter at 1150 N. Victory Place in Burbank, California. The courtyard features paw prints of all movie PATSY Award recipients from 1951 through 1960.

In February 1962, Sam and Lady Buckington gave birth to a female puppy named Shaggy Lady of Lillibrad. In 1963, Mrs. Betty Bovey of Jerome, Idaho bought Shaggy Lady. That summer, Shaggy Lady followed in the footsteps of her famous father Sam playing a shaggy dog in the Walt Disney musical comedy filmed the previous summer starring Hayley Mills, Burl Ives, and Dorothy McGuire and opening in theaters in August, Summer Magic. Sam's film and television career was brief, and little is documented about his life outside his work as an animal actor.
