= Hardy Boys (Mickey Mouse Club serial) =

US TV serial

In the late 1950s, Disney contracted with the Stratemeyer Syndicate and Grosset & Dunlap to produce two Hardy Boys TV serials, starring Tim Considine and Tommy Kirk. The first of the serials, The Mystery of the Applegate Treasure, was aired on The Mickey Mouse Club in 1956 during the show's second season. To appeal to the show's audience, the Hardy Boys were portrayed as younger than in the books (Considine was 15 and Kirk was 14 during filming). The script, written by Jackson Gillis, was based on the first Hardy Boys book, The Tower Treasure, and the serial was aired in 19 episodes of fifteen minutes each with production costs of $5,700. A second serial, The Mystery of Ghost Farm, followed in 1957, with an original story by Jackson Gillis. This serial shares some elements with "The House on the Cliff", the second Hardy Boys book.

Kirk said The Mystery of Ghost Farm was "inferior to the first one. It's a real mishmash; it's pretty terrible... real cheap. Gobbledygook."

Kirk recalled Charles Haas, who directed the first as "a very strict, very tough, no-nonsense director. That's what I remember: very stern and rough, really. The other was directed by Bud Springsteen, who I've never heard of before or since, and who was a real happy-go-lucky."

== Series 1: The Mystery of the Applegate Treasure ==
=== Cast ===
- Tim Considine – Frank Hardy
- Tommy Kirk – Joe Hardy
- Florenz Ames – Silas Applegate
- Russ Conway – Fenton Hardy
- Sarah Selby – Aunt Gertrude
- Carole Ann Campbell – Iola Martin

=== Episodes ===
Episode number	Episode title	Air date
0	An Introduction	Oct 1, 1956
1	A Stranger	Oct 2, 1956
2	A Real Case	Oct 3, 1956
3	The First Clue	Oct 4, 1956
4	The Fugitive	Oct 5, 1956
5	Applegate's Gold	Oct 8, 1956
6	Dig for Treasure	Oct 9, 1956
7	A Pirate's Chest	Oct 10, 1956
8	Boys in Trouble	Oct 11, 1956
9	Female Detective	Oct 12, 1956
10	Iola's Bravery	Oct 15, 1956
11	Footsteps in the Tower	Oct 16, 1956
12	The Prisoner Speaks	Oct 17, 1956
13	The Strange Confession	Oct 18, 1956
14	A Golden Clue	Oct 19, 1956
15	The Final Search	Oct 22, 1956
16	The Tower's Secret	Oct 23, 1956
17	Never Say Die	Oct 24, 1956
18	Boys in Danger	Oct 25, 1956
19	The Tower Treasure	Oct 26, 1956

== Series 2: The Mystery of Ghost Farm ==
=== Cast ===
- Tim Considine – Frank Hardy
- Tommy Kirk – Joe Hardy
- Russ Conway – Fenton Hardy
- Sarah Selby – Aunt Gertrude
- Carole Ann Campbell – Iola Martin
- Andy Clyde - Lacey

=== Episodes ===
Episode number	Episode title	Air date
0	An Introduction	Sept 13, 1957
1	Beginning of the Puzzle	Sept 20, 1957
2	Detective Joe	Sept 27, 1957
3	Who Feeds the Cat?	Oct 4, 1957
4	Two Private Eyes	Oct 11, 1957
5	Man Named Fred	Oct 18, 1957
6	Animals in Danger	Oct 25, 1957
7	Catching a Ghost	Nov 1, 1957
8	The Ghost Speaks	Nov 8, 1957
9	Lacey's Wonderful Will	Nov 15, 1957
10	Detectives in Trouble	Nov 22, 1957
11	The Ghost Confesses	Nov 29, 1957
12	Iola to the Rescue	Dec 6, 1957
13	Panic at the Zoo	Dec 13, 1957
14	Uncle Billy's Secret	Dec 20, 1957

== Opening credits ==
The theme song was performed by Thurl Ravenscroft and played over clips from Disney's Treasure Island.

== Home media ==
In December 2006, the Disney studio issued a Treasures DVD for The Hardy Boys: Mystery of the Applegate Treasure.

== Sources ==
- Connelly, Mark (2008). The Hardy Boys Mysteries, 1927–1979: A Cultural and Literary History. Jefferson, North Carolina: McFarland Publishing. ISBN 978-0-7864-3386-5.
- Kismaric, Carole; Heiferman, Marvin (2007). The Mysterious Case of Nancy Drew and the Hardy Boys. New York: Fireside. ISBN 978-1-4165-4945-1.
