= Jeremy Foley =

Jeremy Foley may refer to:

- Jeremy Foley (athletic director)
- Jeremy Foley (actor)
