= Sylvia Field =

American actress (1901–98)

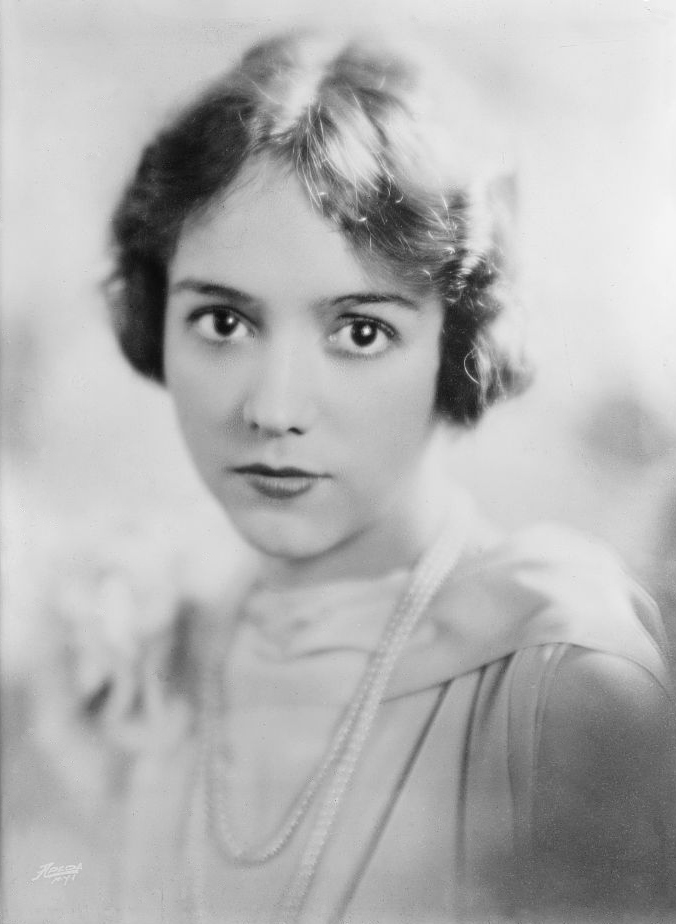
- Sylvia Field, star of the play Broadway (1927)
- Born: Harriet Louisa Johnson; February 14, 1901; Allston, Massachusetts, US
- Died: July 31, 1998 (aged 97); Fallbrook, California, US
- Occupation: Actress
- Years active: 1918–1980
- Spouses: Robert J. Frowhlich (m. 1924–1929) Harold Moffat (m. 1930; died 1938) Ernest Truex (m. 1941; died 1973)
- Children: 1

Sylvia Field (born Harriet Louisa Johnson; February 14, 1901 – July 31, 1998) was an American actress whose career encompassed performances on stage, screen, and TV. She was best known for playing the understanding Mrs. Martha Wilson (Mr. Wilson's wife) on the television sitcom Dennis the Menace on CBS from 1959 to 1962.

== Early life and career ==
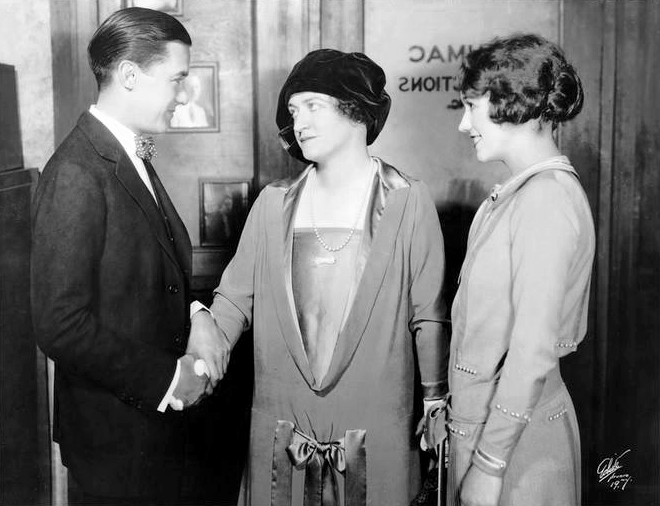
Gregory Kelly, Lucile Webster and Sylvia Field in the Broadway production of George S. Kaufman's The Butter and Egg Man (1925), directed by James Gleason

Born in Allston, Massachusetts, she attended Arlington High School in Arlington, Massachusetts. Field began her acting career on the stage. She made her Broadway debut at age 17 in 1918 in The Betrothal (1918). After appearing in various stage productions, Field made her film debut in the 1928 drama The Home Girl.

Her other films included Voice of the City (1929), Nobody's Darling (1943), Junior Miss (1945) and All Mine to Give (1957).

Field began appearing in guest spots on television in the late 1940s. In 1949, she starred in a locally produced sitcom about her life, The Truex Family. In 1952, she landed the role of Mrs. Remington in the sitcom Mister Peepers. The show, which aired until 1955, co-starred Field's real-life husband Ernest Truex. After the end of Mr. Peepers, Field continued to guest star on episodic television, including in roles on Producers' Showcase, Star Tonight, General Electric Theater, and The Ann Sothern Show. In 1957, Field made a guest appearance on Perry Mason as defendant Belle Adrian in "The Case of the Angry Mourner." In 1958, she played Aunt Lila in the Walt Disney serial Annette, starring Annette Funicello.

In 1959, Field began appearing in her most noted role as Martha Wilson in the CBS sitcom Dennis the Menace. Field's character was written out of the series in 1962 owing to the death of Joseph Kearns, who portrayed George Wilson, Martha's husband. Field continued in television guest spots during the 1960s, including on the ABC sitcoms Our Man Higgins (with Stanley Holloway) and Hazel.

In 1966, Field appeared on Petticoat Junction as Laura Bentley in the episode "Young Love". She played opposite her real-life husband Ernest Truex.

She made her final onscreen appearance in Kathleen Collins' 1980 film The Cruz Brothers and Mrs. Malloy.

== Personal life ==
Field was married three times. Her first marriage was to Robert J. Frowhlich from 1924 to 1929. Her second, to Harold Moffat in 1930, in which they had one daughter, Sally Moffat Kellin, and Sally was married to actor Mike Kellin. Moffat died in 1938. In 1941, Field married actor Ernest Truex, to whom she remained married for 32 years until Truex's death in 1973.

== Death ==
On July 31, 1998, Field died at a nursing home in Fallbrook, California, at age 97.
