= The World's Greatest Athlete =

1973 film by Robert Scheerer

- Theatrical release poster
- Directed by: Robert Scheerer
- Written by: Dee Caruso; Gerald Gardner
- Produced by: Bill Walsh
- Starring: Tim Conway; Jan-Michael Vincent; John Amos; Roscoe Lee Browne; Dayle Haddon; Billy De Wolfe; Nancy Walker
- Cinematography: Frank V. Phillips
- Edited by: Cotton Warburton
- Music by: Marvin Hamlisch
- Production company: Walt Disney Productions
- Distributed by: Buena Vista Distribution
- Release date: February 1, 1973
- Running time: 92 minutes
- Country: United States
- Language: English
- Box office: $22,583,370

The World's Greatest Athlete is a 1973 American sports comedy film directed by Robert Scheerer and starring John Amos, Roscoe Lee Browne, Tim Conway, Dayle Haddon, and Jan-Michael Vincent. Released by Walt Disney Productions, it is one of the few wide-release Hollywood sports films to look at the world of track and field. In the film, two coaches recruit a jungle boy who makes history by winning every event at the NCAA Track & Field Championship. The screenplay was by Dee Caruso and Gerald Gardner who also wrote a novelization of the film. This film was also one of Billy De Wolfe's final roles before he died the following year.

== Plot ==
Sam Archer and his assistant Milo Jackson are coaches at Merrivale College. They have lost every game in every sport that they have coached, raising the concerns of Dean Maxwell and the Alumni Association. With only one year left on his contract, Archer decides that he is in need of a vacation. Archer and Jackson head to Zambia.

While on a safari, they see a Tarzan-like jungle boy named Nanu, who can outrun a cheetah. The coaches attempt to pursue and recruit Nanu, but soon fall (literally) into the clutches of Nanu's godfather, spiritual leader Gazenga. Because Nanu is an orphan and an innocent child of the bush, Gazenga believes that throwing Nanu into the world of competitive United States college athletics would interfere with his spiritual development.

Despite Gazenga's concerns, Archer and Jackson persuade Nanu to join the Merrivale College program. Nanu brings his pet Bengal tiger, Harry, with him. From this point forward, the plot is driven by a combination of slapstick and suspense when Nanu's destiny as the "World's Greatest Athlete" annoys several powerful rivals who are accustomed to getting their way.

Nanu's innocence, Archer's scheming, Jackson's ineptitude, Gazenga's outraged wisdom, and the Machiavellian plotting of the villains all play roles in the action as the film heads toward the final track meet. The atmosphere of American competition does indeed threaten Nanu, but he is saved from disintegration by love interest Jane Douglas. The climactic track meet is peppered with commentary by ABC-TV sportscaster Howard Cosell. After his victory, Nanu decides to return home, accompanied by Jane and Harry. Archer and Jackson bid him farewell at the airport.

In the final scene, Archer and Jackson try to recruit a new athletic phenomenon who resides in China.

== Cast ==
- John Amos as Coach Sam Archer
- Tim Conway as Milo Jackson
- Jan-Michael Vincent as Nanu
- Roscoe Lee Browne as Gazenga
- Dayle Haddon as Jane Douglas
- Billy De Wolfe as Dean Maxwell
- Nancy Walker as Mrs. Petersen
- Danny Goldman as Leopold Maxwell
- Don Pedro Colley as Morumba
- Vito Scotti as Games Spectator
- Liam Dunn as Dr. Winslow
- Ivor Francis as Dean Bellamy
- Leon Askin as Dr. Boris Gottlieb
- Joe Kapp as Buzzer Kozak
- Clarence Muse as Gazenga's Assistant
- Virginia Capers as Native Woman
- Philip Ahn as Old Chinaman
- John Lupton as Race Starter
- Sarah Selby as Woman on Safari
- Russ Conway as Judge with Stopwatch
- Al Checco as Dr. Checco
- Dick Wilson as Drunk in Bar

The film also features many prolific athletes and sports journalists in small or cameo roles, including Howard Cosell, Frank Gifford, Jim McKay, Bud Palmer, Joe Kapp, and Bill Toomey.

An unidentified Bengal tiger actor was used to portray Harry, Nanu's companion and pet who he brings with him from Africa to California. As tigers are not native to Africa, Nanu explains to Archer and Jackson that Harry emigrated from India to Africa as a cub.

== Production ==
Much of the film was shot at University of the Pacific and San Joaquin Delta College in Stockton, California, and in the Newhall neighborhood of Santa Clarita, California. The track scenes were filmed at California State University, Los Angeles. The live-action jungle scenes were shot at Caswell Memorial State Park, on the Stanislaus River outside of Ripon, California.

== Release ==
The film opened on February 1, 1973 at Radio City Music Hall in New York City. It opened on February 7 in Los Angeles and then expanded on the 14th.

=== Home media ===
The World's Greatest Athlete was released on VHS in October 1986 by Walt Disney Home Video, and by Walt Disney Studios Home Entertainment on March 18, 1997. The film was also released on DVD on August 2, 2005. As of March 2024, the film had not appeared on the Disney+ streaming service (unlike the majority of Disney's catalogue titles), for reasons unknown.

== Reception ==
=== Critical response ===
Upon the film's release, A.H. Weiler of The New York Times wrote: "It's a dream that is more often simple-minded than simple and generally as hilarious as finishing fourth in the mile run. It should be stressed, however, that this ribbing of the Tarzan myth runs a good, clean course that should grab all red-blooded sports fans up to and including the 14-year-old group. It might be added that everyone from coach Amos to Jan-Michael Vincent, in the title role, athletically tries without much success to make all this good-natured nonsense funny."

=== Box office ===
The film opened with a disappointing $125,000 in its first week in New York but was one of the most popular releases of 1973, earning $10,600,000 in theatrical rentals in the United States and Canada that year.

== See also ==
- Decathlon
- List of American films of 1973
- List of films about the sport of athletics
- World's Greatest Athlete
