= Violent Saturday =

1955 film by Richard Fleischer

- Theatrical lobby card
- Directed by: Richard Fleischer
- Screenplay by: Sydney Boehm
- Based on: Violent Saturday by William L. Heath
- Produced by: Buddy Adler
- Starring: Victor Mature; Richard Egan; Stephen McNally; Virginia Leith; Tommy Noonan; Lee Marvin; J. Carrol Naish; Sylvia Sidney; Ernest Borgnine
- Cinematography: Charles G. Clarke
- Edited by: Louis R. Loeffler
- Music by: Hugo Friedhofer
- Color process: Color by DeLuxe
- Production company: 20th Century-Fox
- Distributed by: 20th Century-Fox
- Release date: April 20, 1955
- Running time: 90 minutes
- Country: United States
- Language: English
- Budget: $955,000
- Box office: $1.25 million (US rental)

Violent Saturday is a 1955 American crime film directed by Richard Fleischer and starring Victor Mature, Richard Egan and Stephen McNally. Set in a fictional mining town in Arizona, the film depicts the planning of a bank robbery as the nexus in the personal lives of several townspeople. Shot in CinemaScope and filmed on location in Bisbee, Arizona, the supporting cast includes Lee Marvin, Sylvia Sidney and Ernest Borgnine.

== Plot ==
Harper is a bank robber posing as a traveling salesman. He arrives in the town of Bradenville, soon to be joined by sadistic benzedrine addict Dill and bookish Chapman.

Boyd Fairchild is the self-pitying manager of the local copper mine who is troubled by his philandering wife. He considers an affair with nurse Linda Sherman, although he truly loves his wife. His associate Shelley Martin has a happy home life, although his son Steve believes that he is a coward because he did not serve in World War II, having remained in the U.S. to manage the mine for the war effort. Harry Reeves, the manager of the local bank, is a timid peeping tom, and librarian Elsie Braden resorts to larceny to escape her debts.

As the bank robbers execute their plan to rob the bank, Reeves is wounded in a gunfight and Mrs. Fairchild is slain in the crossfire. Meanwhile, Martin is held hostage on a farm with an Amish family. With the help of the family's pacifist father Stadt, he defeats the crooks. Stadt's beliefs are tested to breaking when he is forced to drive a pitchfork into the back of Dill in order to save a wounded Martin. In the aftermath, Martin becomes a hero to Steve and Linda comforts Fairchild as he grieves for his wife.

== Cast ==
- Victor Mature as Shelley Martin
- Richard Egan as Boyd Fairchild
- Stephen McNally as Harper
- Virginia Leith as Linda Sherman
- Tommy Noonan as Harry Reeves
- Lee Marvin as Dill
- Margaret Hayes as Mrs. Fairchild
- J. Carrol Naish as Chapman
- Sylvia Sidney as Elsie Braden
- Ernest Borgnine as Stadt
- Dorothy Patrick as Helen Martin
- Billy Chapin as Steve Martin
- Brad Dexter as Gil Clayton
- Raymond Greenleaf as Mr. Fairchild
- Donald Gamble as Bobby
- Rickey Murray as Georgie
- Robert Adler as Stan
- Harry Carter as Bart
- Ann Morrison as Mrs. Stadt
- Kevin Corcoran as David Stadt
- Donna Corcoran as Anna Stadt
- Noreen Corcoran as Mary Stadt
- Boyd Morgan as Slick
- Richard Garrick as Mr. Braden
- Florence Ravenel as Miss Shirley
- Ellene Bowers as Bank Teller
- Dorothy Phillips as Bank Customer
- Virginia Carroll as Marion
- Ralph Dumke as Sydney
- Robert Osterloch as Roy
- Joyce Newhard as Dorothy
- Helen Mayon Mrs. Pilkas
- Mack Williams as Drug Clerk
- Harry Seymour as Conductor
- John Alderson as Amish Farmer
- Fred Shellac as Signalman

== Production ==
The film was based on the eponymous novel by William L. Heath, although the story's location was changed from Alabama to Arizona for the screenplay. In August 1954, studio chief Darryl F. Zanuck recommended that 20th Century-Fox acquire the screen rights prior to publication, and the studio paid a reported $30,000. Victor Mature had been feuding with Fox, but agreed to play the lead.

Filming began on December 6, 1954. Location filming occurred in Bisbee, Arizona.

Richard Fleischer later wrote in his memoirs that "besides being the first CinemaScope picture ever made for under $1 million, it was a damn good movie. Darryl Zanuck, the studio's big boss, was very taken with it, and we—[producer] Buddy [Adler] and I—became sort of heroes. The direct result of this minor triumph was that I was given a five year directing contract and Buddy became Darryl's most favored producer."

== Reception ==
New York Times film critic Bosley Crowther disapproved of the violence in the film, calling it an "unedifying spectacle," while praising the performance of Lee Marvin as a hood "so icily evil he is funny." He stated a mixed reaction to the supporting cast, calling Tommy Noonan "ridiculous", labeling Margaret Hayes "dreary" and calling Ernest Borgnine's performance (playing an Amish farmer) "a joke" while listing Mature as "bruising".

Later reviewers have been favorable. In a 2008 article, the Village Voice called the film "the reigning king of Southwestern noir." The New York Press said: "Violent Saturday seems rooted in tradition, but as an exciting pulp story with a profound center, it manages to break all the rules." George Robinson of Cine-Journal wrote, "With the possible exception of The Narrow Margin, this is Richard Fleischer's best film ... Great, nasty fun." Michael Sragow of The New Yorker said, "Packed with twists and surprises. Marvin proves most unsettling as a hard guy who's always snorting from an inhaler (it's psychosomatic: he once had a wife with a perpetual cold). Mature, with his stricken manliness, reminds you of why James Agee thought he would be perfect as Diomed in Troilus and Cressida."

== See also ==
- List of American films of 1955
