= The Ronnie Barker Playhouse =

1968 British television comedy series

- Starring: Ronnie Barker
- Country of origin: United Kingdom
- Original language: English
- No. of episodes: 6

Production
- Running time: 25 minutes

Original release
- Network: Rediffusion London
- Release: 3 April – 8 May 1968

The Ronnie Barker Playhouse is a series of six comedy half hours showcasing the talents of Ronnie Barker. All were broadcast by Rediffusion London in 1968.

The series was written by Brian Cooke, Hugh Leonard, Johnnie Mortimer and Alun Owen. The executive producer was David Frost, while the producers were Stella Richman and actress Stella Tanner. All the episodes were directed by Michael Lindsay-Hogg.

This series features the first appearance of Barker's character Lord Rustless, who features in the episode "Ah! There You Are". The character would go onto appear in subsequent shows Hark at Barker and His Lordship Entertains. Another episode "The Incredible Mister Tanner" written by Brian Cooke and Johnnie Mortimer, would go on to be commissioned for a series with Brian Murphy taking over the title role, which ran for one series in 1981.

== Archive status ==
Of the six shows only Tennyson and The Fastest Guy In Finchley are missing from the archives, after the rediscovery of the other four episodes at the BFI in 2012.

== Episode list ==
No.	Title	Archival Status	Original release date
1	"Tennyson"	Missing	3 April 1968
Also starring Dudley Jones, Richard O'Callaghan, Talfryn Thomas and Gwendolyn Watts.
2	"Ah! There You Are"	Exists	10 April 1968
Also starring George A. Cooper, Sandra Michaels, Bill Shine, Victor Winding and Michael Guest.
3	"The Fastest Guy in Finchley"	Missing	17 April 1968
Also starring Walter Horsbrugh, Colin Jeavons, Sheila Keith, Glenn Melvyn and Charlotte Mitchell.
4	"The Incredible Mister Tanner"	Exists	24 April 1968
Also starring Alec Clunes, Frank Gatliff, Doris Hare, Richard O'Sullivan and Billy Cornelius.
5	"Talk of Angels"	Exists	1 May 1968
Also starring Liz Crowther, Gillian Fairchild, Donald Hewlett, David Kelly and Maureen Toal.
6	"Alexander"	Exists	8 May 1968
Also starring Pamela Ann Davy, Molly Urquhart, Pauline Yates and Anthony Trent.
