= Donna Corcoran =

American former child actress

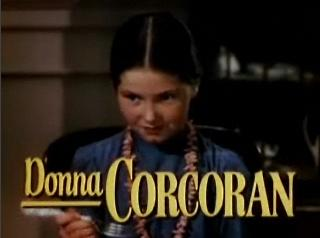
- Corcoran in Scandal at Scourie (1953)
- Born: September 29, 1942 (age 83); Quincy, Massachusetts, U.S.
- Years active: 1951–1963
- Spouse(s): Luis Felipe Guerrero Newman (m. 1961; div.); Jerry Keene (m. 1981; died 2017)
- Children: 2
- Relatives: Noreen Corcoran (sister); Kevin Corcoran (brother); Kelly Corcoran (brother)

Donna Corcoran (born September 29, 1942) is an American former child actress who appeared in nine Hollywood films from 1951 through 1955. She was in two aquatic musicals that featured Esther Williams (portraying swimmer Annette Kellerman as a child in one), and as a vulnerable girl being victimized by an emotionally disturbed babysitter (played by Marilyn Monroe) in Don't Bother to Knock.

After making her last film, she made a token comeback as a young adult in an episode of the long-running sitcom My Three Sons (starring Fred MacMurray) in the early 1960s.

== Personal life ==
Corcoran was born in Quincy, Massachusetts to William Henry Corcoran, Sr. and Kathleen H. McKenney. Several of her siblings were child stars, including younger sister Noreen Corcoran, Kevin Corcoran, and Kelly Corcoran. Corcoran married Luis Felipe Guerrero Newman, a rancher, in 1961; they had two daughters and later divorced. She married mining engineer Jerry Keene in 1981, and they remained married until his death in 2017.

== Filmography ==
=== Films ===
Year	Title	Role	Notes
1951	Angels in the Outfield	Bridget White	with Paul Douglas and Janet Leigh
1952	Love Is Better Than Ever	Janice Lee Yogurt	uncredited
1952	Young Man with Ideas	Caroline Webster	
1952	Don't Bother to Knock	Bunny Jones	with Marilyn Monroe
1952	Million Dollar Mermaid	Annette - 10 years old	with Esther Williams
1953	Scandal at Scourie	Patsy	with Walter Pidgeon and Greer Garson
1953	Dangerous When Wet	Junior Higgins	again with Esther Williams
1954	Gypsy Colt	Meg MacWade	with Ward Bond
1955	Violent Saturday	Anna Stadt	with Victor Mature and Lee Marvin
1955	Moonfleet	Grace	with Stewart Granger

=== Television ===
Year	Title	Role	Notes
1953	Death Valley Days	Gladys Murtaugh	1 episode
1953–1957	The Life of Riley	Ginny	2 episodes
1955	TV Reader's Digest	Sue Carson	1 episode
1956	This Is the Life	Suzy Granville	1 episode
1957	Cavalcade of America	Nancy	1 episode
1957	The Danny Thomas Show	Bobbie, Sorority Sister	1 episode
1960	Tales of Wells Fargo	Helen Brass	1 episode
1963	My Three Sons	Melissa Cartwright	1 episode
1963	The Donna Reed Show	Claudia	1 episode

== Bibliography ==
- Best, Marc. Those Endearing Young Charms: Child Performers of the Screen (South Brunswick and New York: Barnes & Co., 1971), pp. 45–49.
