= David Stollery =

American industrial designer and actor

David John Stollery III (born January 18, 1941, in Los Angeles, California) is a former American child actor and, as an adult, an industrial designer. He appeared in numerous Disney movies and television programs in the 1950s. He is best known for his teenage role as the loner Marty in the Spin and Marty television serials on the Mickey Mouse Club TV series in the mid-1950s.

At the age of seven, he was named Child Actor of the Year for his role in the Broadway production On Borrowed Time. He then appeared in several films, including A Connecticut Yankee in King Arthur's Court in 1949 and Where Danger Lives in 1950. In the early 1950s, Stollery appeared in various television programs, including I Love Lucy, Dragnet, My Friend Irma, The Red Skelton Show, and The Ray Milland Show. It was on the latter program, in the role of The Prodigy, that Walt Disney took notice of his acting and had the 14-year-old sign a Disney Studio contract to play the lead character of Marty Markham in the Spin and Marty serials televised on The Mickey Mouse Club between 1955 and 1957.

In 2000, Stollery and Tim Considine, his co-star in the Spin and Marty serials (they were eighteen days apart in age), made cameo appearances in The New Adventures of Spin and Marty: Suspect Behavior, a made-for-TV movie. A DVD version of the Adventures of Spin & Marty was released in December 2005 as part of the fifth wave of the Walt Disney Treasures series. On the 50th anniversary of the serial's premiere, Stollery and Considine were interviewed by Leonard Maltin as a DVD bonus feature about their experiences filming the series. After his teenage years, Stollery decided not to continue acting as a full-time career. He studied at the Art Center College of Design, then became an automobile designer with General Motors and later Toyota. At Toyota, he designed the second generation A40 Series Toyota Celica in 1978.

== Filmography ==
- Walt Disney Treasures: The Adventures of Spin & Marty (2005) DVD - interview with Leonard Maltin
- The New Adventures of Spin and Marty: Suspect Behavior (2000) - Original Marty
- Ten Who Dared (1960) - Andrew 'Andy' Hall
- Walt Disney Presents: Annette (1958) TV Series - Mike Martin
- Drango (1957) - Jeb Bryant
- The Gale Storm Show - Jonathan (1 episode, 1957)
- The New Adventures of Spin and Marty (1957) TV Series - (Marty Markham)
- Westward Ho, the Wagons! (1956) - Dan Thompson
- The Further Adventures of Spin and Marty (1956) TV Series - Marty Markham
- Storm Fear (1955) - David
- Hallmark Hall of Fame - Tommy (1 episode, 1955)
- The Adventures of Spin and Marty (1955) TV Series - (Martin) Marty Markham
- Her Twelve Men (1954) - Jeff Carlin
- Dragnet - Donald Rush (1 episode, 1952)
- No Pets Allowed (short, 1952)
- Jack and the Beanstalk (1952) - Donald
- I Love Lucy - Timmy Hudson (1 episode "The Amateur Hour", 1952)
- Darling, How Could You! (1951) - Cosmo (Charles) Grey
- Tales of Robin Hood (1951) - Robin as a Boy
- Stop That Cab (1951) (uncredited) - Charles Thomas
- Where Danger Lives (1950) (uncredited) - Dickie, boy patient
- Peggy (1950) (uncredited) - Little Boy in Library
- A Connecticut Yankee in King Arthur's Court (1949, uncredited) - Billy
