= The Littlest Outlaw =

1955 film

- Directed by: Roberto Gavaldón
- Starring: Pedro Armendáriz; Joseph Calleia; Andrés Velázquez
- Cinematography: Alex Phillips
- Edited by: Carlos Savage
- Music by: William Lava
- Production company: Walt Disney Productions
- Distributed by: Buena Vista Film Distribution Co., Inc.
- Release date: December 22, 1955
- Running time: 73 minutes
- Countries: United States; Mexico
- Languages: English; Spanish
- Box office: $1.6 million (US)

The Littlest Outlaw is a 1955 drama film produced by Walt Disney and released by Buena Vista Distribution on December 22. It was directed by Roberto Gavaldón and written by Larry Lansburgh (story), and Bill Walsh (screenplay).

It starred Pedro Armendáriz as Gen. Torres, Joseph Calleia as the Padre, and Andrés Velázquez as Pablito.

== Plot ==
Little Pablito is the ten-year-old stepson of a cruel horse trainer. The trainer is responsible for training a Mexican general's horse to jump for the grand race. The trainer's methods cause the horse to become afraid of jumping and the general orders the animal's death. Pablito runs away with the horse, becoming a fugitive. He travels throughout Mexico encountering several fugitives and a priest who tries to help.

== Cast ==
- Pedro Armendáriz as Gen. Torres
- Joseph Calleia as Padre
- Rodolfo Acosta as Chato
- Andrés Velázquez as Pablito
- Laila Maley as Celita
- Pepe Ortiz as Himself
- Gilberto González as Tiger
- José Torvay as Vulture
- Jorge Treviño as Barber
- José Ángel Espinoza as Señor Garcia
- Enriqueta Zazueta as Señora Garcia
- Irving Lee as Gypsy
- Carlos Ortigoza as Doctor
- Margarito Luna as Silvestre
- Ricardo Gonzáles as Marcos

== Production ==
Larry Lansburgh had been at the Walt Disney Studios for approximately 10 years when he submitted the story treatment for The Littlest Outlaw. At the time, Lansburgh had directed several short films for Disney, mostly simple stories about animals. Bill Walsh expanded the treatment into a screenplay and Lansburgh was retained as producer.

The entire film was shot in Mexico, mostly around San Miguel Allende, with a bilingual English/Spanish cast. Because of this, the film was shot twice, once in English and once in Spanish, enabling it to be released directly into Spanish-speaking markets without the usual dubbing process.

== Reception ==
The Littlest Outlaw received a mildly critical reception. Variety spoke well of the child star Andres Velasquez, but most critics dismissed the film as a routine affair.

== See also ==
- List of films about horses
- List of American films of 1955
