= Sandra Michaels =

British actress (1944–2006)

- Born: Sandra Carol Michaels; 5 April 1944; St. Pancras, London, England
- Died: 23 August 2006 (aged 62); Sutton, Surrey, England
- Occupation: Actress
- Known for: Blue Peter

Sandra Carol Michaels (5 April 1944 – 23 August 2006) was an English actress.

== Background ==
Sandra Carol Michaels was born in St. Pancras, London, England on 5 April 1944. In 1970, she married Peter Horton in Westminster, London. She died in Sutton, Surrey on the 23 August 2006, at the age of 62.

== Career ==
Michaels' first television role was in March 1957, playing Phyllis in the second BBC adaptation of The Railway Children. Later that year she appeared as Pamela Gwendolyn Stuart in The Adventures of Clint and Mac, a British-made serial commissioned by Walt Disney Studios for The Mickey Mouse Club. Also in 1957 she played Caroline, a modern teenager who got up to mischief in the ITV sitcom The Thompsons.

She appeared in a variety of programmes, ranging from the 1959 adaptation of Great Expectations and Dixon of Dock Green (also 1959), to The Ronnie Barker Playhouse (1968) and Gaslight Theatre (1968).

Stage work varied from plays to pantomimes and light musicals; she appeared in Little Old King Cole with Charlie Drake at the London Palladium in 1961, Puss in Boots at the Coventry Theatre with Sid James and Frankie Howerd in 1962–63, and Mandrake at the Criterion Theatre with Roy Kinnear in 1970.

In the 1980s Michaels appeared in a number of documentaries and short films, including the 1987 BAFTA nominated Mohammed's Daughter, directed by Suri Krishnamma.

== Blue Peter ==
In April 1964 Michaels presented two editions of Blue Peter, as a stand-in for Valerie Singleton who was away on vacation, which technically makes her the shortest-serving presenter in the programme's history. Her appearance on Monday 20 April 1964 was evidently planned: her name appears below that of fellow-presenter Christopher Trace in the Radio Times listing for that day. The Merseybeats were guests on that particular programme, which was available to view as part of the TV Heaven collection, now part of the BFI Mediatheque, at the National Science and Media Museum in Bradford. Michaels impressed director Edward Barnes enough that he briefly considered bringing her into the show full-time and replacing Singleton, but Michaels had no interest in the job. Barnes later admitted that, with hindsight and the success Singleton made of her Blue Peter career, he was relieved at this decision.
