= Gypsy Colt =

1954 film by Andrew Marton

- Directed by: Andrew Marton
- Screenplay by: Martin Berkeley
- Based on: Lassie Come-Home; 1940 novel by Eric Knight
- Produced by: Sidney Franklin; William Grady Jr.
- Starring: Donna Corcoran; Ward Bond; Frances Dee
- Cinematography: Harold Lipstein
- Edited by: Conrad A. Nervig
- Music by: Rudolph G. Kopp
- Production company: Metro-Goldwyn-Mayer
- Distributed by: Metro-Goldwyn-Mayer
- Release date: April 2, 1954
- Running time: 72 minutes
- Country: United States
- Language: English
- Budget: $512,000
- Box office: $1,425,000

Gypsy Colt is a 1954 American drama film directed by Andrew Marton and starring Donna Corcoran, Ward Bond and Frances Dee. Shot in Ansco Color, it was produced and distributed by Hollywood studio Metro-Goldwyn-Mayer. The film's basic plot was taken from Lassie Come Home with the focus changed from a dog to the eponymous horse.

A 60-minute version of Gypsy Colt was made available in 1967 as part of the weekly TV anthology Off to See the Wizard.

== Plot ==
A young girl, Meg, is disheartened when her parents Frank and Em MacWade are forced to sell Gypsy Colt, her favorite horse, to a rancher. Gypsy Colt escapes several times, ultimately taking a 500-mile (805-km) journey to return to his rightful owner.

== Cast ==
- Donna Corcoran as Meg
- Ward Bond as Frank
- Frances Dee as Em
- Lee Van Cleef as Hank
- Larry Keating as Wade Y. Gerald
- Nacho Galindo as Pancho
- Rodolfo Hoyos Jr. as Rodolfo
- Peggy Maley as Pat
- Robert Hyatt as Phil Gerald (as Bobby Hyatt)
- Highland Dale as Gypsy, the Horse

== Production ==
Filmed on location in Aspen and Grand Junction, Colorado and the Mojave Desert, Rosemead Dry Lake and Red Rock Canyon, CA.

== Reception ==
According to MGM records, the movie earned $721,000 in the U.S. and Canada and $704,000 in other markets, making a profit of $259,000.

== Comic book adaptation ==
- Dell Four Color #568 (June 1954)

== See also ==
- List of films about horses
