= Her Twelve Men =

1954 film by Robert Z. Leonard

- Theatrical release poster
- Directed by: Robert Z. Leonard
- Screenplay by: William Roberts; Laura Z. Hobson
- Based on: Snips and Snails; 1953 novel by Louise Baker
- Produced by: John Houseman
- Starring: Greer Garson; Robert Ryan; Barry Sullivan; Richard Haydn; Barbara Lawrence; James Arness; Rex Thompson; Tim Considine
- Cinematography: Joseph Ruttenberg
- Edited by: George Boemler
- Music by: Bronislau Kaper
- Production company: Metro-Goldwyn-Mayer
- Distributed by: Loew's Inc.
- Release date: August 11, 1954
- Running time: 91 minutes
- Country: United States
- Language: English
- Budget: $1,534,000
- Box office: $1,418,000

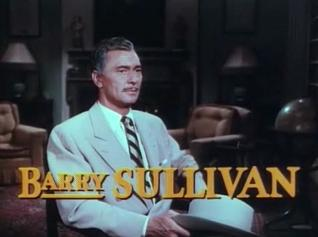
Barry Sullivan in the trailer

Her Twelve Men is a 1954 American comedy drama film starring Oscar-winning Greer Garson and Robert Ryan, directed by Robert Z. Leonard, and written by William Roberts and Laura Z. Hobson. This MGM production was based on the best-selling pseudo-autobiographical book written by Louise Maxwell Baker, Snips and Snails. Baker herself taught at an all-boys boarding school, as the only female teacher in the school. Subsequently, Louise recounts many of the funny stories from her time as a teacher in Snips and Snails, which then translates into the film, Her Twelve Men.

== Plot ==
Although she has had no teaching experience since her last year in college as an assistant instructor, newly widowed Jan Stewart is hired by headmaster Dr. Barrett to be the first woman to teach at The Oaks boarding school. Due to the fact that she is the only woman teaching at the school, the other faculty members either are condescending towards her or try to woo her.

Jan gets to know her twelve students and fellow faculty member Joe Hargrave, who is dating the rich Barbara Dunning. Her young students hate her at first as she gives a strict punishment to a few boys who are disrupting her class; however, they begin to appreciate her nurturing and kind nature, and she begins to serve as mother for many of the boys who miss their actual parents. She has so much sympathy for one young boy, Bobby Lennox, whose globe-trotting parents neglect him, that she reads letters pretending they are from his mother that Jan wrote herself.

A wealthy Texan widower, Richard Oliver, enrolls his son. Richard Jr. instantly alienates the other boys with his attitude and by refusing to confess to causing a fire alarm to go off, for which Dr. Barrett punishes the entire class. The other students in the class then all alienate Richard Jr., as he does not own up to his wrongdoing. This ultimately results in Richard Jr. being pushed out of a second-story window by the other students, causing him to break his leg.

The boy's father wants him sent home and Jan is asked to accompany him on the journey. She wins young Richard's trust and gains Richard Sr.'s interest as well. Richard Jr. starts to treat Jan as a mother figure, as he severely misses his late mother. Later, Richard Sr. ends up proposing to Jan because of his feelings for her, as well as his son's, but Jan and Joe Hargrave ultimately realize they were meant for one another. Jan decides to continue to teach at The Oaks for another year after being begged by Joe Hargrave and her students. Richard Jr. also reconciles with the other students, and appears to finally be happy at The Oaks.

== Cast ==
- Greer Garson as Jan Stewart
- Robert Ryan as Joe Hargrave
- Barry Sullivan as Richard Y. Oliver, Sr.
- Richard Haydn as Dr. Avord Barrett
- Barbara Lawrence as Barbara Dunning
- James Arness as Ralph Munsey
- Rex Thompson as Homer Curtis
- Tim Considine as Richard Y. Oliver, Jr.
- David Stollery as Jeff Carlin
- Frances Bergen as Sylvia Carlin
- Ian Wolfe as Roger Frane
- Donald MacDonald as Bobby Lennox
- Dale Hartleben as Kevin Ellison Clark III
- Ivan Triesault as Erik Haldeman

== Reception ==
According to MGM records, the film earned $817,000 in the US and Canada and $601,000 elsewhere, resulting in a loss of $116,000.
