= Kelly Corcoran =

American child actor (1958-2002)

- Born: Kelly Patrick Corcoran; August 7, 1958; Santa Monica, California, U.S.
- Died: April 17, 2002 (aged 43); Sanger, California, U.S.
- Occupation: Actor
- Relatives: Donna Corcoran (sister); Noreen Corcoran (sister); Kevin Corcoran (brother)

Kelly Patrick Corcoran (August 7, 1958 – April 17, 2002) was an American child actor and youngest brother of actors Donna, Noreen, and Kevin Corcoran.

He was born in Santa Monica, California, on August 7, 1958. He was the youngest child born to William "Bill" Corcoran, Sr. (1905–1958), and the former Kathleen McKenney (1917–1972). His father died five months after his birth. He had several siblings: Donna, Hugh, Noreen, Brian, Kevin, William Jr., and Kerry Corcoran. A few of his siblings were also child stars, and would follow in their footsteps.

During the 1960s-1970s, he would appear in television shows such as Dr. Kildare, The Adventures of Ozzie & Harriet, The Road West, The Big Valley, Family Affair, and Adam-12.

After his acting career ended, he worked at The Pines Resort in Bass Lake, California. Corcoran died at age 43, in Sanger, California from cirrhosis of the liver. His remains were cremated.

== Filmography ==
- 1963 - The Courtship of Eddie's Father as Kelly - Child Party Guest (uncredited)
- 1965 - Dream Wife as Tommy Michaels
- 1966 - Picture Mommy Dead as Little Boy at Estate Sale
- 1969 - This Savage Land as Christopher 'Kip' Pride

== Television series ==
- 1964 Dr. Kildare as Hubby Kimball
- 1964 Valentine's Day as Jimmy Farrell
- 1964–1965 - The Adventures of Ozzie and Harriet as Kelly
- 1965 The Baileys of Balboa Horace
- 1966-1967 The Road West as Kip Pride
- 1966 Run for Your Life as Dickie Hannagan
- 1968–1969 This Is the Life as Jerry
- 1969 The Big Valley as David Howard
- 1970 Family Affair as Willie Craig
- 1970 Adam-12 as Blonde Boy
