= The Clown (1953 film) =

1953 film by Robert Zigler Leonard

- Theatrical release poster
- Directed by: Robert Z. Leonard
- Written by: Frances Marion (story); Leonard Praskins (adaptation); Martin Rackin (screenplay)
- Produced by: William H. Wright
- Starring: Red Skelton; Jane Greer; Tim Considine
- Cinematography: Paul C. Vogel
- Edited by: Gene Ruggiero
- Music by: David Rose
- Distributed by: Metro-Goldwyn-Mayer
- Release date: January 16, 1953 (U.S.)
- Running time: 91 minutes
- Country: United States
- Language: English
- Budget: $887,000
- Box office: $2,099,000

The Clown is a 1953 American drama film starring Red Skelton with Jane Greer and Tim Considine, and directed by Robert Z. Leonard. The story is derived from The Champ (1931).

== Plot ==
Dodo the Clown is a funny man with a drinking problem. He is famous in the business for falling off the Ziegfeld Follies stage, drunk, and punching his longtime manager. His son, Dink, is his biggest fan and his caretaker. Dodo's act is heckling customers coming off a carnival ride, where moving sidewalks, railings, gusts of air and a light shock from Dodo's wand make onlookers, and most of the victims, roar with laughter. An arrogant, humorless young man, embarrassed in front of his date, knocks Dodo to the floor. When the amusement park stage manager examines Dodo's cut lip, Dodo accuses him of trying to smell his breath. He is sober and has been so for a month: Dink bears witness. But the quarrel is the last straw, and Gallagher fires him.

Despite Dink's best efforts, Dodo ruins a job audition—and loses his agent—by turning up drunk. Dink puts Dodo to bed and the next morning goes to see “Uncle Goldie”, Dodo's old agent, who accepts Dodo as a client with $50 “to bind the deal”. After Dink leaves, Goldie tells a skeptical associate about the infamous punch, taking half the blame.

Hoagley, another colleague of Goldie's, offers Dodo a one-night engagement at a sales convention at the Ritz. Enthusiastic at the prospect of a new life, father and son visit a pawn shop to retrieve Dodo's tuxedo and a watch Flo Ziegfeld gave him. Dodo presents the watch to Dink as a gift. At the convention, Goldie doesn't want Dodo to perform, because the part is that of a stooge, but Dodo agrees to endure the humiliation if Goldie takes Dink away.

Dodo's ex-wife Paula Henderson and her successful new husband, Ralph, are in the audience. She doesn't recognize Dink until the boy embraces Dodo. Ralph goes backstage to say that Paula wants to see her son, whom she surrendered during the divorce because Dodo was a wealthy star. Dodo takes $200 from Henderson and sends Dink to their hotel room, where he tells Paula about his father. He thinks his mother died a long time ago and is unimpressed when she reveals who she is.

Dodo promptly loses the money in a dice game, as well as the watch, which he takes while Dink is asleep. The guy who won the watch offers to sell it back. In the morning, Henderson asks for the boy. Dink discovers the watch is missing and is crushed.

Dodo takes a job at a stag party—with strippers to earn the $65 he needs to buy back the watch. When the police raid the event, Goldie bails him out. Bewildered, Goldie tells Dodo he would have given him $6,500 if he had asked. Dodo tells Goldie to take Dink to his mother, telling the boy he doesn't like him anymore and slapping him. After Dink and Goldie leave, Dodo, weeping, punches an old picture of himself repeatedly while crying, “I hit my kid! I hit my kid!"

Dink is welcomed by the Hendersons, but he runs away.

Goldie comes up with a great opportunity for television, The Dodo Delwyn Show. Dodo refuses, until Dink appears. Dink is thrilled at the chance for a comeback. During rehearsal, Dodo has a moment of breathlessness during a stair-climbing routine.

The Hendersons come to the opening broadcast. Paula tells Dodo that he's done a wonderful job with Dink, who belongs with him.

The show is a huge success. After several acts, Dodo gets dizzy but insists on finishing with a “topsy turvy” sketch where a drunk wakes to find the room turned on its side, thanks to his wife and a helpful carpenter. He takes his bow, thanking the audience for “filling his heart.” Offstage, he collapses and dies. Inconsolable, Dink ricochets from man to man, calling for his father, then runs to Paula's arms, calling her Mother, and crying “Dodo is dead!” over and over as they walk away.

== Cast ==
- Red Skelton as Dodo Delwyn
- Tim Considine as Dink
- Jane Greer as Paula Henderson
- Philip Ober as Ralph Z. Henderson
- Loring Smith as Goldie
- Lou Lubin as Little Julie
- Fay Roope as Doctor Strauss
- Walter Reed as Joe Hoagley
- Eddie Marr as television director
- Jonathan Cott as floor director
- Don Beddoe as Gallagher
- Steve Forrest as Young Man (with Blonde Girlfriend)
- Karen Steele as Blonde Girlfriend
- Frank Nelson as Charlie (uncredited)
- Shirley Mitchell (1953) as Mrs. Blotto (uncredited)
- Roger Moore as Roger (Man Meeting Hogarth)
- Charles Bronson as Eddie (Dice Player)
- Ned Glass as Danny Daylor (Dodo's agent)

== Production ==
The Ziegfeld Follies flashback is a 6-minute ballet class number taken from MGM's Bathing Beauty, the 1944 film starring Red Skelton, with Esther Williams and Basil Rathbone.

When the film was released, Skelton was a familiar figure to American television audiences. The Red Skelton Show debuted on September 30, 1951, on NBC, in a half-hour format like the one used on Dodo Delwyn's fictional show. With changes of network, format (to one hour) and name, to The Red Skelton Hour in 1962, it lasted until 1971.

The cast includes actors worth noting: Young Tim Considine was on the brink of a successful career that includes a long stint with Disney. The part of Eddie, the gambler to whom Dodo loses the watch, is played by Charles Buchinsky, better known as Charles Bronson. Steve Forrest and Roger Moore, two "men" had important careers ahead of them. Other familiar voices and face include Billy Barty, who would be a regular on Skelton's TV show. Frank Nelson, who plays the comic, Charlie, was a staple radio voice on Jack Benny's show, among others, and became familiar to television audiences in memorable roles that included appearances on every season of I Love Lucy.

== Reception ==
The New York Times critic A. W. found much to like in the film and praised Skelton's performance:

“It has been more than twenty years since Metro released its slightly saccharine but sturdy "The Champ," ...so a new generation should not feel especially cheated to have the story refurbished for the atomic age... credit is due Martin Rackin and Leonard Praskins for their adaptation of the Frances Marion story, since it manages to avoid unnecessary bathos and to Director Robert Z. Leonard's handling of his principals...While the mixture of tears and a small measure of laughs is as before it is not too cloying a compound. Since Red Skelton is no stranger to clowning and greasepaint it is pleasant to report that he takes to the role—a characterization only slightly related to the slapstick assignments which have been his lot—like an aspiring "Hamlet." And, as in the previous edition, our hero desperately clings to the love he has for his son, a sturdy and self-reliant little citizen, who not only takes care of himself but of his old man. ... Red Skelton illustrates quite competently that he can read a straight line as well as fall on his face. However, the pratfalls are not missing entirely as he is permitted to run through a couple of his familiar routines. Tim Considine is properly wistful, serious and manly as his adoring youngster, and Jane Greer as his ex-wife; Loring Smith as his understanding agent and Lou Lubin as a 10 percenter handling sleazy entertainment, add adequate supporting portrayals. 'Show business,' one of the principals remarks, 'is either feast or famine.' In the case of The Clown it is a combination of both.”

In a 2005 article about the film, Turner Classic Movies observed: “Most reviews at the time were lukewarm to the movie, but had praise for Skelton's dramatic turn. As Variety noted, ‘The presentation is given a sincerity in performances, writing and direction that keeps the sentiment from dipping too far into the maudlin, and while the story has an old-fashioned feel, it is fundamentally okay drama that takes nicely to the updating.’ Aside from Skelton and Considine, the reviewer also has kudos for Jane Greer, who '...is exceptionally good as the ex-wife, giving the role a warmth that makes it believable.' “

== Box office ==
According to MGM records the film earned $1,539,000 in the US and Canada and $560,000 elsewhere, resulting in a profit of $437,000.
