= William L. Heath =

American writer (1924 to 2007)

- Born: William Ledbetter Heath; September 29, 1924; Lake Village, Arkansas, U.S.
- Died: February 1, 2007 (aged 82); Guntersville, Alabama, U.S.
- Education: University of Virginia
- Occupation: Writer
- Spouse: Mary Anne Stahle (m. 1950)
- Children: 3

William Ledbetter Heath (September 29, 1924 – February 1, 2007) was an American writer. He published numerous short stories and eight novels, including Violent Saturday, an example of Southern noir, and which was adapted into film.

== Biography ==
Heath was born in Lake Village, Arkansas, to Charles Merrill and Ann Maples Heath. When he was still an infant, his mother died, and he was sent to live with his grandmother and aunt in Scottsboro, Alabama. Small-town life would later inform his literary work.

He attended Baylor Military Academy in Chattanooga, Tennessee, and the University of Virginia in Charlottesville. The outbreak of World War II interrupted his education, and he enlisted in the U.S. Army Air Corps. He served in the China Burma India theater as a radio operator in the B-24 Liberator, and he was awarded the Distinguished Flying Cross with oak leaf cluster. After the war, he returned to university and completed his degree in English. Upon graduation in 1949, he worked as a copy editor at the Chattanooga Free Press. In 1950 he married Mary Anne Stahle, with whom he had three sons. Later, he returned to Scottsboro and worked at the family textile mill, Maples Industries, until his retirement. He died in Guntersville in 2007.

== Publications ==
- 1955: Violent Saturday. New York: Harper.
- 1956: Sad Clown (also titled The Laughing Stranger of East Point).
- 1957: Ill Wind. New York: Harper.
- 1959: Temptation in a Southern Town (also titled Blood on the River). New York: Hillman Periodicals.
- 1971: The Good Old Boys. New York: McCall Publishing Company.
- 1973: Most Valuable Player. New York: Harcourt Brace Jovanovich.
- 1977: Max the Great. Illustrated by Dorothy Koda. New York: Crane Russak.
- 1980: The Earthquake Man. New York: Beaufort Books.
