= Scandal at Scourie =

1953 film

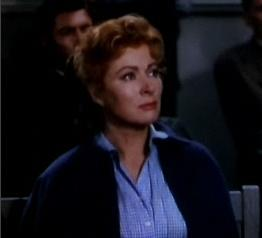
- Directed by: Jean Negulesco
- Written by: Norman Corwin; Leonard Spigelgass; Karl Tunberg
- Based on: Good Boy; 1951 story in Good Housekeeping by Mary McSherry
- Produced by: Edwin H. Knopf
- Starring: Greer Garson; Walter Pidgeon; Donna Corcoran
- Cinematography: Robert H. Planck
- Edited by: Ferris Webster
- Music by: Daniele Amfitheatrof
- Color process: Technicolor
- Production company: Metro-Goldwyn-Mayer
- Distributed by: Loew's Inc.
- Release date: May 17, 1953
- Running time: 90 minutes
- Country: United States
- Language: English
- Budget: $1,148,000
- Box office: $1,625,000

Scandal at Scourie is a 1953 American drama Technicolor film directed by Jean Negulesco, starring Greer Garson, Walter Pidgeon "above the title", and co-starring Donna Corcoran. Garson and Pidgeon were together for the 8th and last time in this movie, which was filmed on location in Canada.

== Plot ==
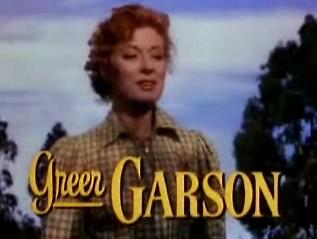

Catholic girl Patsy (Donna Corcoran) lives in an orphanage in Quebec. After Patsy accidentally knocks over a lamp, starting a fire that burns the orphanage down, she finds a new home with the McChesney couple, who live in Protestant Ontario. While Victoria McChesney (Greer Garson) is excited about the new family member, Patrick McChesney (Walter Pidgeon) reacts reluctantly as he was uninformed of the adoption, and is also a candidate for the Parliament in Ottawa. After Victoria overcomes a case of mycetism caused by Patsy collecting poisonous mushrooms, Patsy is suspected of causing a fire at the local school. The examination of the case finds no concrete evidence against Patsy. McChesney declares to give up his candidature in order to accept Patsy as his daughter. Patsy, however, flees. In the meantime, her innocence is proven. Patsy is found again and accepted in the McChesney home as their daughter.

== Cast ==
- Greer Garson as Victoria McChesney
- Walter Pidgeon as Patrick J. McChesney
- Agnes Moorehead as Sister Josephine
- Donna Corcoran as Patsy
- Arthur Shields as Father Reilly
- Philip Ober as B. G. Belney
- Rhys Williams as Bill Swazey
- Margalo Gillmore as Alice Hanover
- John Lupton as Artemus
- Philip Tonge as Fred Gogarty
- Wilton Graff as Leffington
- Ian Wolfe as Councilman Hurdwell
- Michael Pate as Rev. Williams
- Tony Taylor as Edward
- Patricia Tiernan as Second Nun
- Victor Wood as James Motley
- Perdita Chandler as Sister Dominique
- Walter Baldwin as Michael Hayward
- Ida Moore as Mrs. Ames

== Reception ==
According to MGM records the film earned $783,000 in the US and Canada and $842,000 elsewhere, resulting in a loss of $333,000.

== Notes ==
Scandal at Scourie was the last of eight movies that paired Greer Garson and Walter Pidgeon. The others were:

- Blossoms in the Dust (1941)
- Mrs. Miniver (1942)
- Madame Curie (1943)
- Mrs. Parkington (1944)
- Julia Misbehaves (1948)
- That Forsyte Woman (1949)
- The Miniver Story (1950)
