= Kevin Corcoran =

American child actor (1949–2015)

- Corcoran in Savage Sam (1963)
- Born: Kevin Anthony Corcoran; June 10, 1949; Santa Monica, California, U.S.
- Died: October 6, 2015 (aged 66); Burbank, California, U.S.
- Other name: "Moochie"
- Occupation: Actor
- Years active: 1954–2009
- Known for: The Shaggy Dog; Swiss Family Robinson; Toby Tyler
- Spouse: Laura Soltwedel (m. 1972)
- Relatives: Donna Corcoran (sister); Noreen Corcoran (sister); Kelly Corcoran (brother)

Kevin Anthony "Moochie" Corcoran (June 10, 1949 – October 6, 2015) was an American child actor. He appeared in numerous Disney projects between 1957 and 1963, leading him to be honored as a Disney Legend in 2006.

== Early life ==
Born in 1949 in Santa Monica, California, Corcoran was one of eight children. His father, William "Bill" Corcoran Sr. was a police officer and then director of maintenance at Metro-Goldwyn-Mayer studios. Corcoran's mother, the former Kathleen McKenney, was, like her husband, a native of Quincy, Massachusetts.

== Career ==
Between 1956 and 1960, Corcoran played several different (but similar) characters, each bearing the nickname "Moochie". Although he was never a Mouseketeer, Corcoran appeared in three Mickey Mouse Club serials, beginning with Adventure in Dairyland, where he played Moochie McCandless, a farmer's son. This was the first of Corcoran's many Disney credits. He soon returned, as Montgomery (Moochie) O'Hara, in two Spin and Marty serials, The Further Adventures of Spin and Marty and The New Adventures of Spin and Marty.

Corcoran appeared in a Mouseketeer outfit with the name Moochie across his chest just once. In Disneyland: The Fourth Anniversary Show (1957), "Mouseketeer" Moochie repeatedly badgers Walt Disney for information about Zorro. Also on the fourth anniversary show, aired on September 11, 1957, segments were shown of The Rainbow Road to Oz, a proposed live-action film about characters in the Land of Oz. Inspired by L. Frank Baum's Oz books, the film was to star some of the Mouseketeers, including Darlene Gillespie as Dorothy and Annette Funicello as Ozma, as well as Tommy Kirk and Corcoran.

Continuing his fictional Moochie roles, Corcoran played Montgomery "Moochie" Daniels in the 1959 Disney film The Shaggy Dog. He also starred as Moochie Morgan in Moochie of the Little League (1959) and Moochie of Pop Warner Football (1960), both for the Disney anthology series. Character actor Russ Conway played his father.

In each iteration, Moochie likes to hang out with the older "guys" (big brother Wilby in The Shaggy Dog, the title characters in Spin and Marty), and hates being treated like the little kid he is. His determination to emulate elder peers despite adult warnings (swimming, helping Wilby, even switch-hitting) frequently gets him in trouble, but Moochie's bravado always returns soon afterward. Film writer Donald Liebenson has called Corcoran's character "part All-American boy and part hellion."

== Other childhood roles ==
Corcoran appeared in numerous Disney projects (and a handful of non-Disney ones) without the Moochie name. He starred as Toby, an orphan who runs off to join the circus, in Toby Tyler, or Ten Weeks with a Circus (1960). He also starred in Disney's Johnny Shiloh in the title role. These were the only two theatrical films in which Corcoran had the lead roles. Important co-starring roles include the following:

- Violent Saturday (1955) — Amish son (also with sisters Donna and Noreen)
- Old Yeller (1957) — younger son Arliss Coates
- The Shaggy Dog (1959) — younger son Moochie Daniels
- The Rabbit Trap (1959) — Duncan Colt
- Goliath II (1960) — Goliath II (voice)
- Pollyanna (1960) — Pollyanna's friend, orphan Jimmy Bean
- Swiss Family Robinson (1960) — youngest son Francis Robinson
- Daniel Boone (1960 Disney miniseries) — son James Boone
- Toby Tyler (1960) — Toby Tyler
- Babes in Toyland (1961) — nursery rhyme character Boy Blue
- Aquamania (1961) — Goofy Jr. (voice)
- Bon Voyage! (1962) — younger son Skipper Willard
- The Mooncussers (1962 Disney TV movie) — Jonathan Feather
- Johnny Shiloh (1963 Disney TV movie) — Union Army drummer (later sergeant) Johnny Lincoln Clem
- Savage Sam (1963) — Arliss Coates again
- A Tiger Walks (1964) — Tom Hadley
- Blue (1968) — Rory Calvin

Kevin Corcoran and Tommy Kirk played brothers in five films, beginning with 1957's Old Yeller, and Kevin always played the role of a rambunctious animal lover who would try to catch and befriend various animals, ranging from cuddly puppies to dangerous animals like tigers and bears. The other films in this category were The Shaggy Dog (1959), Swiss Family Robinson (1960), Bon Voyage! (1962) and Savage Sam (sequel to Old Yeller, 1963). Fred MacMurray played their father in The Shaggy Dog and Bon Voyage!; Dorothy McGuire played their mother in Old Yeller and Swiss Family Robinson.

In 1961, he did the voice of Goofy Jr. in the animated short Aquamania. He played a role in Wagon Train in the episode "The Cassie Vance Story".

Corcoran largely retired from acting after A Tiger Walks, although he also appeared in the 1968 film Blue in a minor role. In an interview for the DVD release of The Shaggy Dog, he credits his studio teachers with having prepared him well for his college studies.

== Adult career ==
Corcoran graduated from California State University, Northridge with a degree in theatre arts. After this, he returned to Disney, this time working behind the camera as an assistant director and producer. His credits from this era include Superdad (1973), The Island at the Top of the World (1974) and Pete's Dragon (1977). He also worked on The New Mickey Mouse Club (1977). He was an associate producer on Treasure of Matecumbe (1976), on the sequel Return from Witch Mountain (1978) and on The North Avenue Irregulars (1979). He co-produced Herbie Goes Bananas (1980), and was the producer of the comedy television series Herbie, the Love Bug (1982) and Zorro and Son (1983). Corcoran's later contributions to Disney included commentaries and interviews on such Disney DVD releases as The Shaggy Dog and Pollyanna.

He also served as first assistant director on several non-Disney television series, including Scarecrow and Mrs. King, Quantum Leap, Profiler and Karen Sisco; and produced a number of projects. Over the course of his tenure on the Angela Lansbury series Murder, She Wrote, he was credited as first assistant director, assistant producer, and director.

== Personal life ==
Kevin Corcoran was the brother of Donna Corcoran, Noreen Corcoran, Hugh Corcoran, Brian Corcoran, Kerry Corcoran, and Kelly Corcoran. Another brother, Bill Corcoran Jr., former dean of students at California State University, Fresno, died in 2007. Elder siblings Donna, Noreen, and Hugh Corcoran have extensive film and television credits as child actors during the 1950s.

Kevin Corcoran and his wife, Laura Soltwedel, were married from 1972 until his death on October 6, 2015.

== Death ==
Corcoran was diagnosed with colorectal cancer at age 60. He died from this illness at age 66 on October 6, 2015. His remains were cremated by the Neptune Society, and his ashes were scattered into the Pacific Ocean ten days later.

== Honors ==
Kevin Corcoran was honored as a Disney Legend on October 9, 2006. Among the other recipients at the 2006 ceremony were the two lead actors in Corcoran's Spin and Marty serials, Tim Considine and David Stollery, and Corcoran's frequent co-star, Tommy Kirk, who was a veteran of The Mickey Mouse Club serials about The Hardy Boys.

== Bibliography ==
- Best, Marc. Those Endearing Young Charms: Child Performers of the Screen. (South Brunswick: Barnes & Co., 1971), pp. 50–55.
- Cotter, Bill. The Wonderful World of Disney Television: A Complete History. Hyperion, 1997. ISBN 978-0-7868-6359-4
