= Noreen Corcoran =

American film and television actress (1943–2016)

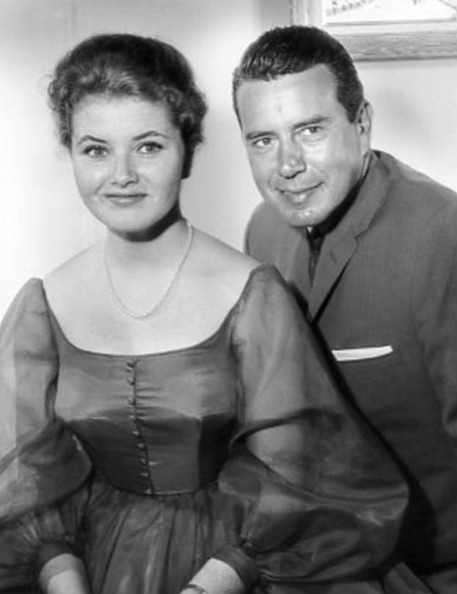
- Corcoran (left) with John Forsythe in Bachelor Father, 1961
- Born: Noreen Margaret Corcoran; October 20, 1943; Quincy, Massachusetts, U.S.
- Died: January 15, 2016 (aged 72); Van Nuys, California, U.S.
- Occupations: Film and television actress
- Years active: 1951–1965
- Relatives: Donna Corcoran (sister); Kevin Corcoran (brother); Kelly Corcoran (brother)

Noreen Margaret Corcoran (October 20, 1943 – January 15, 2016) was an American film and television actress. She was best known for playing Kelly Gregg in the American sitcom television series Bachelor Father.

== Early years ==
Corcoran was born in Quincy, Massachusetts, the third of eight children to William Henry "Bill" Corcoran, Sr. and Kathleen Hildegarde Corcoran (née McKenney). Her siblings William Henry "Bill Jr.," Donna, Kerry, Hugh, Kevin, Brian and Kelly all acted as children.

She attended Fresno State University from 1962 to 1964, but did not graduate.

== Acting career ==
Corcoran began acting in 1951, appearing in the film Apache Drums, playing the role of a child. She also had roles in Dr. Kildare, Hans Christian Andersen, Channing, Gidget Goes to Rome, Cavalcade of America, Mr. Novak, and So This Is Love.

Ronald Reagan recommended Corcoran for the role of Kelly Gregg on the new CBS television series Bachelor Father. The series, about a wealthy bachelor raising his orphaned niece, ran from 1957 to 1962.

Corcoran's last role was in the television series The Big Valley.

== Later life and death ==
After retiring from acting, Corcoran worked at the Lewitzky Dance Company for over a decade. She never married or had children. She died on January 15, 2016, of cardiopulmonary disease in Van Nuys, California, at the age of 72.

== Filmography ==
=== Film ===
Year	Title	Role	Notes
1951	Apache Drums	Child	uncredited
1952	Wait till the Sun Shines, Nellie	Adeline Halper at Age 6	uncredited
1952	Plymouth Adventure	Ellen Moore	uncredited
1952	Hans Christian Andersen	Little Girl	uncredited
1953	The Story of Three Loves	Anna	uncredited
1953	I Love Melvin	Clarabelle Schneider	
1953	Young Bess	Bess as a Child	
1953	So This Is Love	Grace Moore at 8	
1953	The Robe	Girl	uncredited
1953	A Lion Is in the Streets	Schoolgirl	uncredited
1954	Tanganyika	Sally Marion	
1955	Violent Saturday	Mary Stadt	uncredited
1957	Band of Angels	Young Manty	uncredited
1963	Gidget Goes to Rome	Lucy McDougall	
1965	The Girls on the Beach	Selma	

=== Television ===
Year	Title	Role	Appearances
1952	The Adventures of Kit Carson	Anita Alba	1 episode
1952–1953	Chevron Theatre		2 episodes
1953	The Loretta Young Show	Natalie Baxter	1 episode
1953–1955	Cavalcade of America	Nancy Merki at 9	2 episodes
1954	The Pepsi-Cola Playhouse		1 episode
1955	Four Star Playhouse	Anna	1 episode
1955	The Adventures of Rin Tin Tin	Judy	1 episode
1955	Studio 57		1 episode
1956	Chevron Hall of Stars	Amy	1 episode
1957–1962	Bachelor Father	Kelly Gregg	157 episodes
1957	Circus Boy	Jill	1 episode
1957	General Electric Theater	Kelly Gregg	1 episode
1959	The Magical World of Disney	Marion Morgan	1 episode
1962	Saints and Sinners	Jane Melton	1 episode
1963	Going My Way	Sally McMullen	1 episode
1963	Dr. Kildare	Nurse Mary Thompson	1 episode
1963	Channing	Donna	1 episode
1964	The Eleventh Hour	Alice Lang	1 episode
1964	Ben Casey	Audrey Kietner	1 episode
1964	Gunsmoke	Ellen	1 episode
1964	Mr. Novak	Cathy Williams	1 episode
1965	The Big Valley	Sharon	1 episode
