= Fern Persons =

American actress

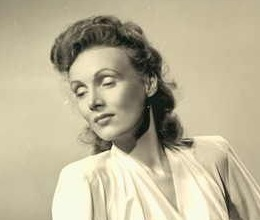
- Fern Persons in 1944
- Born: Fern Gwendolyn Ball; July 27, 1910; Chicago, Illinois, U.S.
- Died: July 22, 2012 (aged 101); Denver, Colorado, U.S.
- Occupation: Actress
- Spouse(s): Max Persons (m.1935–71; his death); 1 child

Fern Gwendolyn Persons (née Ball; July 27, 1910 – July 22, 2012) was an American film and television actress and a member of the Screen Actors Guild‐American Federation of Television and Radio Artists from 1937 until her death. Her film credits included Field of Dreams and Hoosiers.

Persons served on the national board of directors of the Screen Actors Guild (SAG) from 1976 to 1998. She also sat on SAG's Chicago Branch Council for 44 years and the AFTRA Chicago Local Board for more than thirty years. Much of her work at SAG and AFTRA focused on improving the professional acting opportunities for older actors.

== Early years ==
Fern Gwendolyn Ball was born in 1910 in Chicago, Illinois; her parents were Mr. and Mrs. John Ball. She moved to Kalamazoo, Michigan, as a young girl with her family and graduated from Central High School there. She earned a Bachelor of Arts in drama from Kalamazoo College in 1931, graduating magna cum laude and being recognized at commencement for achieving honors in French and English. In 1933 she received a Bachelor of Fine Arts of acting from Carnegie Institute of Technology in Pittsburgh, Pennsylvania. She was a member of Phi Beta Kappa there, and at the commencement she was awarded an Otto Kahn prize for distinction in acting.

While she was at Carnegie Tech, she had lead roles in five of the Carnegie Little Theatre's nine productions.

== Career ==
Once she graduated from Carnegie, Persons worked in Detroit in radio for a short period. The family, which now included a newborn daughter, then moved to Chicago so Persons could pursue her acting career in the latter half of the 1930s.

Persons joined Screen Actors Guild (SAG) in 1937 and became the fifth member of the SAG Chicago Branch when she joined in 1953. She was elected to the Chicago Branch Council in 1962 and served for forty-four years until 2006, when she stepped down only because she could no longer drive. She also served more than thirty years on the AFTRA Chicago Local Board. Persons was elected to the SAG National Board in 1976, and served on that body until 1998. During that time, from 1977 to 1981, she was elected SAG 5th national vice president. She served as a SAG Regional Branch Division representative on TV/Theatrical and Commercials negotiating committees throughout the 1980s and intermittently through the 1990s.

== Personal life ==
Ball married Max Persons, whom she had met while both were college students, in October 1935, and they remained married for thirty-six years until his death in November 1971. On July 27, 1999, Chicago Mayor Richard Daley officially declared "Fern Persons Day" to mark her 89th birthday. The day honored her contributions to the Chicago arts and acting communities. Persons had previously resided in Evanston, Illinois. Persons moved to Colorado in 2010 to be closer to her daughter.

== Death ==
She died in her sleep on July 22, 2012, in Littleton, Colorado, at the age of 101. She was survived by her daughter, Nancy Rockafellow, three grandsons and six great-grandchildren.

== Filmography ==
Films

- The Golden Gloves Story (1950) - Mrs. Burke
- Man of Steel (1965)
- On the Right Track (1981) - Flower Lady
- Hudson Taylor (1981)
- Class (1983) - Headmistress DeBreul
- Risky Business (1983) - Lab Teacher
- Grandview, U.S.A. (1984) - Teacher
- Hoosiers (1986) - Opal Fleener
- Field of Dreams (1989) - Annie's Mother
- Prelude to a Kiss (1992) - Elderly Woman
- The Secret (2000) - Great Aunt Daria
- Boricua (2004) - Hilde Klingenberg (final film role)

Television

- Those Endearing Young Charms; main cast (1952) - Abbe Charm
- The Mickey Mouse Club; 1 episode (1956)
- Adventure in Dairyland; main cast (1956) - Mrs. McCandless
- Cavalcade of America; 1 episode (1957) - Mrs. Hubbard
- Chicago Story; TV Movie (1982)
- American Playhouse; 1 episode (1984) - Aunt Vera
- Hard Knox; TV Movie (1984)
- Jack and Mike; 1 episode (1987)
- Sable; 1 episode (1987) - Rebecca Sable
- Mario and the Mob; TV Movie (1992)
- Missing Persons; 1 episode (1993) - Althea Swanson
- Early Edition; 2 episodes (1997–1999) - Mrs. Flowers, Librarian / Helen
- ER; 1 episode (1999) - Old Woman on El
