= The Adventures of Clint and Mac =

- Neil Wolfe (left) as American teenager "Clint Rogers" and Jonathan Bailey as British schoolboy "Alistair 'Mac' MacIntosh".
- Genre: Children's program
- Written by: Malcolm Stuart Boylan
- Directed by: Terence Fisher
- Original language: English
- No. of episodes: 15

Production
- Producer: Bill Walsh
- Production location: London
- Cinematography: Ernest Palmer
- Production company: Walt Disney Productions

Original release
- Release: December 30, 1957 – January 17, 1958

The Adventures of Clint and Mac is a 1957 television serial that aired on ABC as part of the third season of The Mickey Mouse Club. It was filmed on location in London, England.

== Plot ==
Clint is an American boy living in London while his father is stationed there with the United States Air Force. He's formed a friendship with Mac, his neighbor, whose father is a Scotland Yard inspector. The serial, taking place over the course of a single day, portrays their involvement in the theft of the original manuscript of the novel Treasure Island and their attempts to return it to its rightful owners.

== Cast and characters ==
- Neil Wolfe as Clint Rogers
- Jonathan Bailey as Alistair "Mac" MacIntosh
- John Warwick as Inspector MacIntosh
- Dorothy Smith as Mac's Mother
- Bill Nagy as Clinton Rogers, Sr.
- Mary Barclay as Clint's mother
- Sandra Michaels as Pamela Stuart
- George Woodbridge as Toby Jug
- Eric Phillips as Constable Hawkins

== Episodes ==
1. "An Introduction" (Dec 30, 1957)
2. "The Day Begins" (Dec 31, 1957)
3. "The Mysterious Bookshop" (Jan 1, 1958)
4. "The Strange Character" (Jan 2, 1958)
5. "The Forgotten Clue" (Jan 3, 1958)
6. "Looking For Trouble" (Jan 6, 1958)
7. "A Call For Help" (Jan 7, 1958)
8. "The Chase" (Jan 8, 1958)
9. "The Meeting of the Pirates" (Jan 9, 1958)
10. "The Getaway Boat" (Jan 10, 1958)
11. "The Unseen Watchers" (Jan 13, 1958)
12. "Dangerous Journey" (Jan 14, 1958)
13. "Pamela Takes a Hand" (Jan 15, 1958)
14. "The Signal" (Jan 16, 1958)
15. "A Battle Royal" (Jan 17, 1958)
