= Legion of Fire: Killer Ants! =

1998 television film

- Genre: Horror
- Written by: Linda Palmer; Wink Roberts
- Directed by: Jim Charleston; George Manasse
- Starring: Eric Lutes; Julia Campbell; Mitch Pileggi; Jeremy Foley
- Music by: Daniel Licht
- Country of origin: United States
- Original language: English

Production
- Executive producers: Irwin Meyer; Michael I. Levy
- Producer: George Manasse
- Cinematography: Don E. FauntLeRoy
- Editor: Jim Cross
- Production companies: Producers Entertainment Group; Grosso-Jacobson Productions; World International Network

Original release
- Network: Fox
- Release: June 24, 1998

Legion of Fire: Killer Ants! (alternatively titled Marabunta) is a 1998 made for TV horror movie, made for the Fox TV channel.

In 2005, Legion of Fire: Killer Ants! was released on DVD in Germany under the title Marabunta. No announcement has been made on the possibility of an English language release, although it is still shown regularly during the Sci Fi Channel's weekend movie marathons under its alternative name Marabunta. It is also available on NowTV.

== Plot ==
Dr. Jim Conrad is visiting the small town of Burly Pines, Alaska to fish. While out with a friend, they discover a moose that has been stripped clean of meat. They presume hunters left it for scavengers, but then the hunters arrive and say they had shot it two hours earlier and had been tracking it since. A shopkeeper is found in the same condition in his home. The authorities think it may have been a predator, but Jim is unsure. During the autopsy, Jim finds something on the man's body. When he looks at it under a microscope, it is the jaws of a marabunta, a South American ant known for traveling in waves, killing everything in their path. After questioning Police Chief Jeff Croy and his men, Jim figures out that the ants must have arrived on a boat that had crashed a few years ago, leaving logs of South American wood behind. The ants had hibernated in the wood until recent seismic activity had made it warm enough to support them.

Jim teams up with Croy and schoolteacher Laura to try to find a way to stop the ants. Jim and Karen go to the beach where the wood from the ship washed up to kill the queen. The ants attack Jim's friend, who is piloting the helicopter. While trying to fight them off, his actions cause the helicopter to lift off and crash into the mountain. Jim and Laura find themselves surrounded by the ants. They hold them off using a flame thrower and shotgun until they can reach a nearby canoe, which they take downstream until they reach a waterfall and go over it. Having survived the falls, they find an old cabin with a motorcycle. They get it started just as the ants reach them and ride it back to town. They convince Croy to evacuate the town. Croy has local Native American Gray Wolf handle the evacuation and tells his son Chad to go with them. When everyone is out of town, Gray Wolf is to blow up the only road out of town. Chad goes back to his father against his wishes and returns to help while Gray Wolf sets up the dynamite. At the school, Jim and Laura create a mixture that can kill the ants, but the ants attack the school. Chad gets trapped in a school bus while Jim and Laura are chased to the school's top floor. Croy arrives in his truck, and they escape with help from Jim's formula. They make their way out of town, but Gray Wolf is forced to blow the pass early when he sees the ants making their way along it.

After determining the ants' pattern, they decide to blow up the local dam and flood the entire town to kill the ants. Jim and Laura get some dynamite and head to the dam. They leave Chad in Croy's truck parked on top of the dam as a lookout while they dig holes in the earthen side of the dam at intervals and insert the dynamite with different length fuses. While they are working, a rescue helicopter, sent by Gray Wolf, arrives to carry them out of town. Chad gets in, and once they have lit the dynamite, Croy and Karen join him. Jim has trouble lighting his fuse, and an aftershock knocks him down, but he is finally able to get it lit. The pilot flies the helicopter down to where Jim is, and, with Croy's help, he gets aboard just as the dynamite explodes.

The dam is destroyed, and the water floods the entire valley, including the town. The pilot lands the helicopter on a nearby hill, and the group looks at the flooded valley, hoping the ants have drowned. Jim decides to stay for a while to study the area more. He warns the group that they cannot be sure all of the ants, including the queen, died and that any survivors would probably go back underground and into hibernation. As the movie ends, surviving ants are shown walking on some stones near the water's edge, where it is discovered the queen is indeed alive and has wings, thus potentially repeating the cycle.

== Cast ==
- Eric Lutes as Dr. James Conrad
- Julia Campbell as Laura Sills
- Mitch Pileggi as Police Chief Jeff Croy
- Jeremy Foley (actor) as Chad Croy
- Bill Ozbourne as Officer Dave Blount
- Dallen Gettling as Bob Hazzard
- Patrick Fugit as Scott Blount
- H.E.D. Redford as Maynerd Perth
- Don Shanks as Greywolf
- Kim Landry as Sarah
- Jeanette Puchich as Margie
- Duane Stephens as Hunter # 1
- Rob Greyhill as Hunter # 2
- Rick Lichenhan as Resident at Pass
- Christine Romeo as Fran
- Ron Sarchian as Glenn

== Critical reception ==
The movie did not fare well with critics. In the Minneapolis Star Tribune, a reviewer commented that the movie "continues a great, cheesy tradition of ant-menace movies." The Encyclopedia of Fantastic Film calls it a "standard SF-thriller." Eric Fowler at the Indianapolis Morning Register was less kind, calling the film, "a blot on the history of sci-fi and an insult to ants everywhere."
