= Sarah Selby =

American actress (1905–1980)

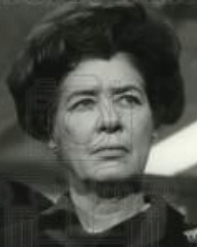
- Selby in Dragnet, 1967
- Born: Sarah Elizabeth Selby; August 30, 1905; Middletown, Ohio, U.S.
- Died: January 7, 1980 (aged 74); Los Angeles, California, U.S.
- Occupation: Actress
- Years active: 1941–1979
- Spouses: Holger Yngvar Harthern (m. 1945 – 1966) (his death); Stanley Robert Wuliger (m. 1943 – 1944) (divorced)
- Children: 2

Sarah Elizabeth Selby (August 30, 1905 – January 7, 1980) was an American actress.

== Career ==
Selby was a character actress who played minor roles for the most part – usually a town gossip, maiden aunt, or teacher. Beginning her career as a radio actress, she made her screen debut voicing one of the elephants in Disney's Dumbo (1941). She was best known for her recurring role as Ma Smalley, the owner of a boarding house on TV's Gunsmoke (1955). She had recurring roles on The George Burns and Gracie Allen Show, initially as Gracie's friend Mamie Kelly, and then a recurring role as Lucille Vanderlip the society hostess wife of banker Chester Vanderlip. In 1963 she played Mrs. Cardiff in "The Way of Aaron," Season 4, Episode 24 of Bonanza. In 1964, she appeared with Jackie Cooper in "Caesar and Me", an episode of the Twilight Zone (Season 5, Episode 32). She also had a recurring role on Father Knows Best as Jim Anderson's (Robert Young) secretary.

She appeared in numerous films from 1941 to 1978. In her first role, she voiced the elephant Prissy in the movie Dumbo. Selby was an actress, known for Tower of London (1962), Beyond the Forest (1949) and a recurring role as Aunt Gertrude in The Mickey Mouse Club television series The Hardy Boys: The Mystery of the Applegate Treasure (1956). Among her radio program appearances, she played various roles on 1947 Escape drama anthology series, and was a regular cast member as Grace in the 1948–50 Junior Miss radio sitcom.

== Personal life and death ==
Selby was married to Holger Yngvar Harthern-Jakobsen, and to Stanley Robert Wuliger. She died from cancer at the age of 74, on January 7, 1980, in Los Angeles California.

== Feature-length films ==
1943

- The Seventh Victim - Min Gottschalk

1944

- San Diego, I Love You - Mrs. Lovelace
- The Curse of the Cat People - Miss Plunkett

1945

- The Strange Affair of Uncle Harry - Alice
- Earl Carroll Vanities - Mrs. Thayer
- The Beautiful Cheat - Athena [Haven]
- Wonder Man - Woman in library
- The Naughty Nineties - Mrs. Hawkins

1946

- One Exciting Week - Committee Woman
- Idea Girl - Esmeralda
- Little Iodine - Mrs. Bigdome

1947

- Swell Guy - Lorraine
- Stork Bites Man - Mrs. Greene
- The Fabulous Texan - Unknown
- That's My Man - Unknown

1948

- A Double Life - Anna
- Trapped by Boston Blackie - Mrs. Carter
- Train to Alcatraz - Widow's friend

1949

- Beyond the Forest - Mildred Sorren
- Prison Warden - Vivian Markham
- Side Street - Nurse Williams

1950

- Perfect Strangers - Mrs. Wilson

1951

- Jim Thorpe – All-American - Miss Benton

1952

- The Sniper - (unknown character role)
- The Iron Mistress - Mrs. Bowie

1953

- Battle Circus - Capt. Dobbs
- Mister Scoutmaster - Mrs. Weber
- The System - Liz Allen

1954

- Men of the Fighting Lady - Mrs. Syzmanski

1955

- Good Morning, Miss Dove - Teacher
- Battle Cry - Mrs. Forrester
- The McConnell Story - Mom Brown

1957

- An Affair to Remember - Miss Lane
- Short Cut to Hell - Adam's secretary
- Gunfire at Indian Gap - Bessie Moran
- Stopover Tokyo - Wife of High Commissioner
- No Time to Be Young - Helen Root

1962

- Moon Pilot - Mrs. Celia Talbot
- Tower of London - The Queen

1964

- Taggart - Maude Taggart

1967

- Don't Make Waves - Ethyl

1973

- The World's Greatest Athlete - Woman in jeep who points out cheetah

== Bibliography ==
- Dunning, John (1998). On the Air : The Encyclopedia of Old-Time Radio. New York : Oxford University Press. ISBN 978-0-19-507678-3.
