= Tim Considine =

American actor and sportswriter (1940–2022)

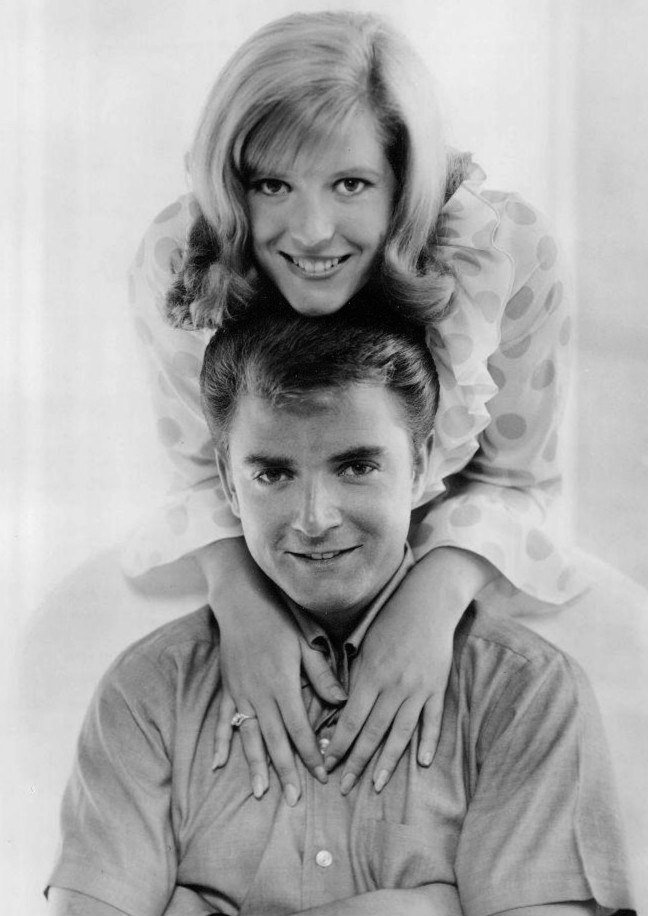
- Considine and Meredith MacRae in My Three Sons, 1965
- Born: Timothy Daniel Considine; December 31, 1940; Los Angeles, California, U.S.
- Died: March 3, 2022 (aged 81); Los Angeles, California, U.S.
- Occupations: Actor; author; photographer
- Years active: 1953–2015
- Spouses: Charlotte Stewart (m. 1965; div. 1969) Willett Hunt (m. 1979)
- Children: 1
- Relatives: John Considine (brother); John Considine (paternal grandfather); Alexander Pantages (maternal grandfather)

Timothy Daniel Considine (December 31, 1940 – March 3, 2022) was an American actor, writer, photographer, and automotive historian. He was best known for his acting roles in the late 1950s and early 1960s.

== Early life ==
Considine was born in Los Angeles on December 31, 1940. His mother, Carmen (née Pantages), was the daughter of theater magnate Alexander Pantages; his father, John W. Considine Jr., was an Oscar-nominated movie producer for Boys Town. Considine's grandfather, John Considine, was Alexander Pantages' rival vaudeville impresario, while one of his uncles, Bob Considine, was a columnist and author. He had two siblings: John, who was also an actor, and Erin.

== Career ==
Considine made his film debut in 1953, co-starring with Red Skelton in The Clown (1953), a remake of the 1931 movie The Champ. Credited as Timmie Considine, a review by The New York Times characterized his performance as "properly wistful, serious, and manly".

In 1954, Considine appeared in the feature film Her Twelve Men (1954) alongside David Stollery.

=== 1955–1959: Disney ===
Considine's first acting performances included roles in the 1955–1957 Disney TV serials which appeared as 15-minute segments on The Mickey Mouse Club. He was also in the 1955 film, The Private War of Major Benson alongside his future My Three Sons costar William Demarest.

Based on the 1942 novel Marty Markham by Lawrence Edward Watkin, Disney adapted the novel into a serial, with the working title The Marty Markham Story. Considine was originally cast as the main lead of Marty, but preferred the secondary character, Spin. The project was retitled to Spin and Marty, and expanded the role of Spin to a lead character. Considine personally recommended his friend and actor, Stollery, for the role of Marty. The serial was made into three seasons, The Adventures of Spin and Marty (1955), The Further Adventures of Spin and Marty (1956), and The New Adventures of Spin and Marty (1957).

In the 1956 serial, The Hardy Boys, Considine played older brother Frank Hardy, opposite Tommy Kirk as Joe Hardy. It aired for two seasons, The Mystery of the Applegate Treasure (1956) and The Mystery of Ghost Farm (1957).

In 1957, Considine played the role of Ned Nickerson in a television unaired pilot made for CBS based on the Nancy Drew series of books by Carolyn Keene. He co-starred with Roberta Shore and Frankie Thomas.

Also as part of The Mickey Mouse Club, Considine starred in the 1958 serial, Annette, which featured the Mouseketeer Annette Funicello. Considine played Steve Abernathy, and once again, co-starred with Stollery.

In 1959, he appeared in the Disney show The Swamp Fox as Gabriel Marion, nephew of Francis Marion.

In the Disney motion picture The Shaggy Dog (1959), Considine was cast as Buzz Miller, and appeared alongside his Disney co-stars Funicello, Kirk and Stollery.

=== 1959–1970: Television and film ===
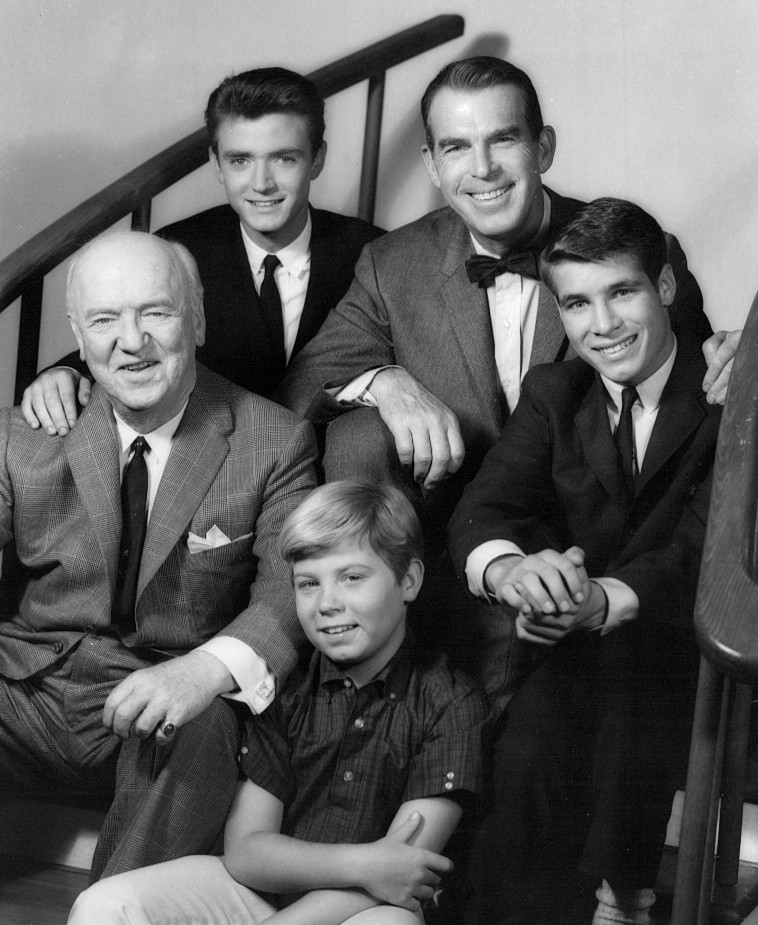
Clockwise from left: William Frawley, Considine, Fred MacMurray, Don Grady, and Stanley Livingston on My Three Sons (1962)

Considine appeared as the eldest son, Mike Douglas, in the first years of the long-running television series My Three Sons, when it aired on ABC. In both The Shaggy Dog and My Three Sons, he starred with Fred MacMurray.

On December 31, 1959, his 19th birthday and before the debut of My Three Sons, Considine appeared as Jamie Frederick in the episode "Bound Boy" on CBS's Johnny Ringo western television series, starring Don Durant in the title role. In the story line, a rancher is investigated for turning orphaned boys into virtual slaves.

The following year, Considine played the role of Franklin D. Roosevelt's eldest son James between ages 14 and 17, in the 1960 feature film Sunrise at Campobello.

In a 1966 episode of The Fugitive he acted as a helper for Dr. Kimble. He played young rebel Billy Penn in the Bonanza episode "The Reluctant Rebel", which aired on November 21, 1965. Considine played the role of "Scott Coleman" in the 1970 Gunsmoke television series (S16.E6 and S16.E7), "Snow Train" parts 1 and 2.

Considine later featured in the 1970 film Patton, portraying the shell-shocked soldier slapped by General George S. Patton Jr. The role is credited as "Soldier Who Gets Slapped".

=== Post acting-career ===
As an adult, Considine was an automobile historian, photographer, and writer who specialized in motor sports. He was the author of The Photographic Dictionary of Soccer (1979, ISBN 978-0-4468-7953-8), The Language of Sport (1982, ISBN 978-0-8719-6653-7), and American Grand Prix Racing: A Century of Drivers and Cars (1997, ISBN 978-0-7603-0210-1). He also filled in for the late William Safire as writer of the "On Language" column in The New York Times Magazine. His photography work included the cover of Joni Mitchell's 1971 album Blue.

=== Anniversary ===
In 2000, Considine and David Stollery, his co-star in the Spin and Marty serials, made cameo appearances in The New Adventures of Spin and Marty: Suspect Behavior, a made-for-TV movie on the ABC network. A DVD version of the Adventures of Spin & Marty was released in December 2005 as part of the fifth wave of the Walt Disney Treasures series. On the 50th anniversary of the serial's premiere, Considine and Stollery were interviewed by Leonard Maltin as a DVD bonus feature about their experiences filming the hit series. Considine later participated in the My Three Sons 50th-anniversary reunion at the Paley Center for Media in Beverly Hills, California, on June 19, 2010. He was a panelist at the event alongside most of the surviving cast members.

== Personal life ==
Considine married his first wife, Charlotte Stewart, in 1965. They did not have children and divorced in 1969. Ten years later, he married Willett Hunt. They remained married until his death and had one son, Christopher.

Considine died on March 3, 2022, at his home in Mar Vista, California. He was 81 years old.

== Filmography ==
=== Film ===
Year	Title	Role	Ref
1953	The Clown	Dink Delwyn	
1954	Executive Suite	Mike Walling	
1954	Her Twelve Men	Richard Y. Oliver Jr.	
1955	Unchained	Win Davitt	
1955	The Private War of Major Benson	Cadet Lt. Gerald Hibler	
1959	The Shaggy Dog	Buzz Miller	
1960	Sunrise at Campobello	James Roosevelt	
1970	Patton	Private First Class Charles Kuhl	
1973	The Daring Dobermans	Warren	

=== Television ===
Year	Title	Role
1955	The Adventures of Spin and Marty	Spin
1956	The Further Adventures of Spin and Marty	Spin
1956	The Hardy Boys: The Mystery of the Applegate Treasure	Frank Hardy
1957	The Hardy Boys: The Mystery of the Ghost Farm	Frank Hardy
1957	The New Adventures of Spin and Marty	Spin
1958	Annette	Steve
1959	The Swamp Fox	Gabriel Marion
1959	Dick Powell's Zane Grey Theatre	Peter Owens
1959	Cheyenne	Billy McQueen
1959	Johnny Ringo	Jamie Frederick
1960	My Three Sons	Michael Douglas
1963	The Untouchables	Arnie Mizo
1965	Bonanza	Billy Penn
1966	The Fugitive	Howie Keever
1969	Medical Center	Charlie Filbey
1969	Ironside	Richie
1970	Gunsmoke	Scott Coleman
1971	The Smith Family	Jim York
1983	Simon & Simon	Photographer Jean-Claude
1995	Legend	Edgar Taggert
