= The Hardy Boys: The Mystery of the Applegate Treasure =

1956 American TV serial

The Hardy Boys: The Mystery of the Applegate Treasure is a 1956 American TV serial that was broadcast in episodes of The Mickey Mouse Club. It was based on The Hardy Boys stories in particular The Tower Treasure.

According to Diabolique magazine: "Watching the serial today it's very much an item of its time, but Kirk's performance is a wonder – relaxed, energetic, a complete natural; he's not as conventionally good looking as Considine but he seems more at home on screen. He was the perfect Disney star."

== Cast ==
- Tim Considine as Frank Hardy
- Tommy Kirk as Joe Hardy
- Sarah Selby as Aunt Gertrude
