= Spin and Marty =

Television series of Disney shorts

- David Stollery (left) as Marty Markham and Tim Considine as Spin Evans introduce the series.
- Genre: Serial
- Created by: Lawrence Edward Watkin
- Written by: Jackson Gillis; Lois Hire; Dick Conway; Roland Maclaine; Lawrence Edward Watkin; Tom Adair; James Allardice; Tom Waldman; Frank Waldman
- Directed by: William Beaudine Sr. Hollingsworth Morse; Alvin Ganzer; Leigh Jason; Lew Landers; Lewis Allen; Tom Gries
- Starring: David Stollery; Tim Considine; Harry Carey Jr. Annette Funicello; Roy Barcroft; J. Pat O'Malley
- Composers: Paul Smith; Franklyn Marks; Buddy Baker
- Country of origin: United States
- No. of episodes: The Adventures of Spin and Marty (1955): 25; The Further Adventures of Spin and Marty (1956): 23; The New Adventures of Spin and Marty (1957): 30

Production
- Executive producer: Bill Walsh
- Running time: 11 minutes per episode
- Production company: Walt Disney Productions

Original release
- Network: ABC
- Release: November 4, 1955 – December 13, 1957

Spin and Marty is a series of television shorts that aired as part of The Mickey Mouse Club show of the mid-1950s, produced by Walt Disney and broadcast on the ABC network in the United States. There were three serials in all, set at the Triple R Ranch, a boys' western-style summer camp. The first series of 25 eleven-minute episodes, The Adventures of Spin and Marty, was filmed in 1955. Its popularity led to two sequels — The Further Adventures of Spin and Marty in 1956 and The New Adventures of Spin and Marty in 1957.

The serials were based on the 1942 novel Marty Markham by Lawrence Edward Watkin. The shows' success led to a reprinting of Watkin's novel in 1956 and the Spin and Marty comic books of the late 1950s. Spin and Marty aired as reruns on the Disney Channel until September 9, 2002. The first season's 25 episodes with bonus material were released on DVD by Disney in 2005.

== Premise and major characters ==
The serialized Disney television adaptation of the novel starred David Stollery as the rich, orphaned Martin "Marty" Markham and Tim Considine as the poorer Spin Evans, the most athletic and popular boy at the Triple R Ranch. When the pampered Marty first arrives at the ranch in a chauffeur-driven limousine, his contemptuous dismissal of the dude ranch as a "dirty old farm" and evident fear of horses result in his ostracism by the other boys, led by Spin. By the end of the first season, however, Marty overcomes his fears and wins acceptance, becoming close friends with his erstwhile foe, Spin. Supporting roles include Sammy Ogg as their jokester sidekick Joe Simpson, and B. G. Norman as Ambitious, Marty's first friend at the Triple R.

The cast of the second season added popular Mouseketeer Annette Funicello as Annette from the Circle H, and Kevin Corcoran as Moochie. The third season added another Mouseketeer, Darlene Gillespie, and the program evolved into a showcase for song and dance sketches as part of a "Let's put on a show!" storyline reminiscent of Mickey Rooney–Judy Garland films.

All three serials also had Roy Barcroft as Triple R owner Col. Logan, Harry Carey Jr. as popular counselor Bill Burnett, and J. Pat O'Malley as Perkins, Marty's butler and the Triple R's assistant cook. In the first two serials, Leonard Geer played Ollie, the wisecracking (and wise) stablehand in charge of the horses.

== Production ==
Disney's producer was Bill Walsh and the screenplay was written by Jackson Gillis. The director was William Beaudine. Budgeted at $600,000 (equivalent to more than $5 million in 2024), filming for the inaugural season's episodes began at the Golden Oak Ranch in June 1955 and wrapped in September, while the juvenile cast members were on summer vacation from school. The shows' success led to Disney reprinting Watkin's novel in 1956, which is available for online viewing.

== Music ==
The series featured a couple of songs, the "Triple R Ranch" song ("Yippee Yay, Yippee Yi, Yippee Yo"), as well as a song about "Slue-Foot Sue" ("Buckaroo"), named for Pecos Bill's tragic love story. Among the musical pieces featured in the third series was a cover of the Disney song "Nowhere in Particular" by Perkins and Sam the cook.

== Remake ==
A TV movie focusing on updated versions of the eponymous characters, The New Adventures of Spin and Marty: Suspect Behavior, was made in 2000 for The Wonderful World of Disney, with David Gallagher and Jeremy Foley in the title roles. Bearing little resemblance to the original, it was based on the Paul Zindel novel The Undertaker's Gone Bananas. Stollery and Considine made cameo appearances.

== Home media ==
The first season's episodes with bonus material were released on DVD by Disney on December 6, 2005, as part of The Walt Disney Treasures series. Hosted by Leonard Maltin, it includes the complete first season of 25 episodes, plus bonus features such as interviews with David Stollery, Tim Considine, and Harry Carey Jr., on the 50th anniversary year of the series' original telecasts. Maltin wrote of Considine's and Stollery's roles: "The key to the serial's success was ... Tim and David seemed genuine, and boys and girls related to them. The series may seem low-key to a modern generation raised on video games and the Internet, but it was that unhurried pace and simple storytelling that captured the hearts and imaginations of an entire generation".

== Comic book ==
"Their day of fun was masked in dangers", the September 1958 cover of Dell Comics' Spin and Marty series, picturing David Stollery and Tim Considine.

Western Publishing published comic book adventures of Spin and Marty beginning in 1956, first under Dell Comics Four Color title (#714, 767, 808, 826), then under their own title (#5-9), then in Four Color again (#1026 and 1082). The comic books continued even after the television series had ended, such as issue number 7 in September 1958 (pictured): Stollery and Considine, by then 17-year-olds, are depicted on the cover in their Spin and Marty characters, as they confront danger at the Triple-R Ranch. Disney included this cover with its 2005 DVD release. Gold Key Comics later reprinted some of these stories in their titles, such as the Walt Disney Showcase comic book issue of 1975, "The Treasure of Old Fort Resolute".

== Disney Legends ==
In October 2006, Stollery, Considine and Corcoran were all honored as Disney Legends. Funicello had been so honored in 1992.
