= Jeremy Foley (actor) =

American actor and director

Jeremy Foley is an American actor and director. Foley is perhaps best known for his roles as Billy in the Buffy the Vampire Slayer episode "Nightmares" and Griffen Lowe in the Nickelodeon show Caitlin's Way.

Foley also played Graham in the 1997 film Dante's Peak and voiced the titular ghost in Casper: A Spirited Beginning and Casper Meets Wendy. He also played Clay in the 1999 movie Soccer Dog. In 2015, he directed Fated and in 2018 The Faceless Man.

== Films and TV series ==
- Dante's Peak
- Chicago Hope
- Buffy the Vampire Slayer
- Casper: A Spirited Beginning
- The Ugly Duckling
- Hiller and Diller
- Touched by an Angel
- Legion of Fire: Killer Ants!
- Casper Meets Wendy
- Maggie
- The New Batman Adventures
- Soccer Dog: The Movie
- Stray Dog
- The Wonderful World of Disney
- Diaries of Darkness
- Caitlin's Way
- Blink
- The Guardians
- Roommate Wanted
- Action News 5
