= Babes in Toyland (operetta) =

Operetta by Victor Herbert and Glen MacDonough

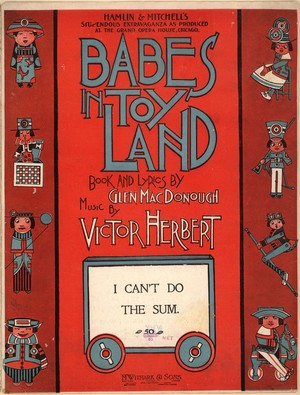
- Sheet music cover
- Music: Victor Herbert
- Lyrics: Glen MacDonough
- Book: Glen MacDonough
- Productions: 1903 and 1905, New York; 1929 and 1930 Broadway; 1934 Film; 1961 Film; 1972 and annually Off-Broadway

Babes in Toyland is an operetta composed by Victor Herbert with a libretto by Glen MacDonough, which wove together various characters from Mother Goose nursery rhymes into a musical extravaganza. Following the extraordinary success of their stage musical The Wizard of Oz, which was produced in New York beginning in January 1903, producer Fred R. Hamlin and director Julian Mitchell hoped to create more family musicals. MacDonough had helped Mitchell with revisions to the Oz libretto by L. Frank Baum. Mitchell and MacDonough persuaded Victor Herbert to join the production. Babes in Toyland features some of Herbert's most famous songs – among them "Toyland", "March of the Toys", "Go to Sleep, Slumber Deep", and "I Can't Do the Sum". The theme song "Toyland", and the most famous instrumental piece from the operetta, "March of the Toys", occasionally show up on Christmas compilations.

The original production opened at the Grand Opera House in Chicago in June 1903, produced by Hamlin and directed by Mitchell, and toured to several East Coast cities before opening in New York in October 1903 and ran for 192 performances. This was followed by many successful tours and revivals. The piece was so popular that it spawned other "fairy-tale" shows over the next decade.

== Productions ==
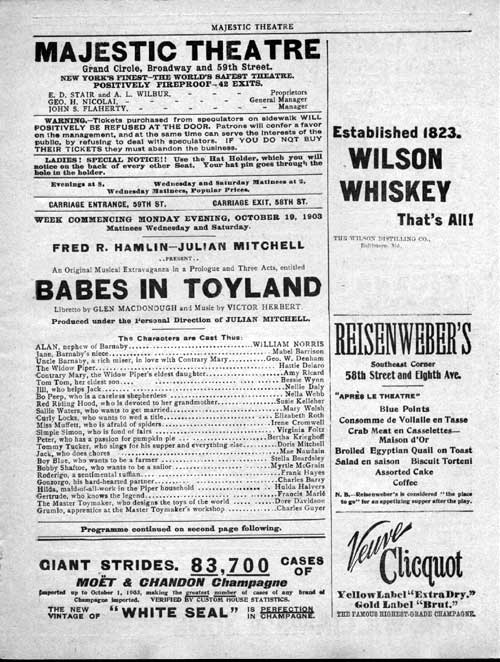
1903 program

After a three-month tryout beginning on June 17, 1903, at the Grand Opera House in Chicago, followed by a tour to several East Coast cities, the original New York production opened on October 13, 1903, at the Majestic Theatre at Columbus Circle in Manhattan (where The Wizard of Oz had played) and closed after 192 performances on March 19, 1904. It was produced by Fred R. Hamlin and directed by Julian Mitchell. Large audiences were drawn to the musical by the spectacular settings and opulent sets (e.g., the Floral Palace of the Moth Queen, the Garden of Contrary Mary) of Toyland. The sets were designed by John H. Young and Homer Emens, with costumes designed by Caroline Siedle. In September 1904, two tours went on the road. The first-class one played a three-week return engagement beginning on January 2, 1905, at the Majestic, and then continued its tour, keeping the scenic effects and much of the original cast, and making stops in major cities for extended periods of time. The second-class tour with a reduced cast, more modest scenery, and a smaller 20-piece orchestra was streamlined for short stays on the road.

The operetta has been staged nine times at The Muny, beginning in 1920.

A Broadway revival opened on December 23, 1929, at Jolson's 59th Street Theatre, closing on January 11, 1930, after 32 performances. It was directed by Milton Aborn. From New York the company moved on to Keith's Theater in Philadelphia, while a second company played at the Majestic Theatre in Boston. Additional performances followed at Poli's Theatre in Washington, D.C., and finally back at the Majestic in Chicago, for a three-week run beginning on March 26, 1930. Another Broadway revival opened on December 20, 1930, at the Imperial Theatre, closing in January 1931 after 33 performances. It was directed by Aborn and choreographed by Virginie Mauret.

A new book and lyrics for the show were written for the off-Broadway Light Opera of Manhattan (LOOM) in 1975 by Alice Hammerstein Mathias (the daughter of Oscar Hammerstein II) and the company's director-producer William Mount-Burke. LOOM played this operetta as a Christmas show for six to eight weeks each year thereafter for 13 seasons with considerable success, and this version of the book and lyrics has since been used by various companies, including Troupe America and others. The ensemble becomes a mechanical militia of toys for the "March of the Toys", and children from the audience are brought up to help "wind-up" the toy dancers.

In 2003, in celebration of the 100th anniversary of the operetta, Hampton, Virginia–based Rainbow Puppet Productions created a touring puppet version of the show entitled "Toyland!" The new script was adapted by David Messick Jr. Prerecorded puppet voices were created, featuring Mickey Rooney as the Master Toymaker and his wife Jan Rooney as Mother Goose. The program has toured annually since that time. In this version, Little Bo Peep has lost her sheep, and her evil Uncle Barnaby is to blame. She travels through the Spider Forest to seek help from the kind Master Toymaker.

== Characters ==
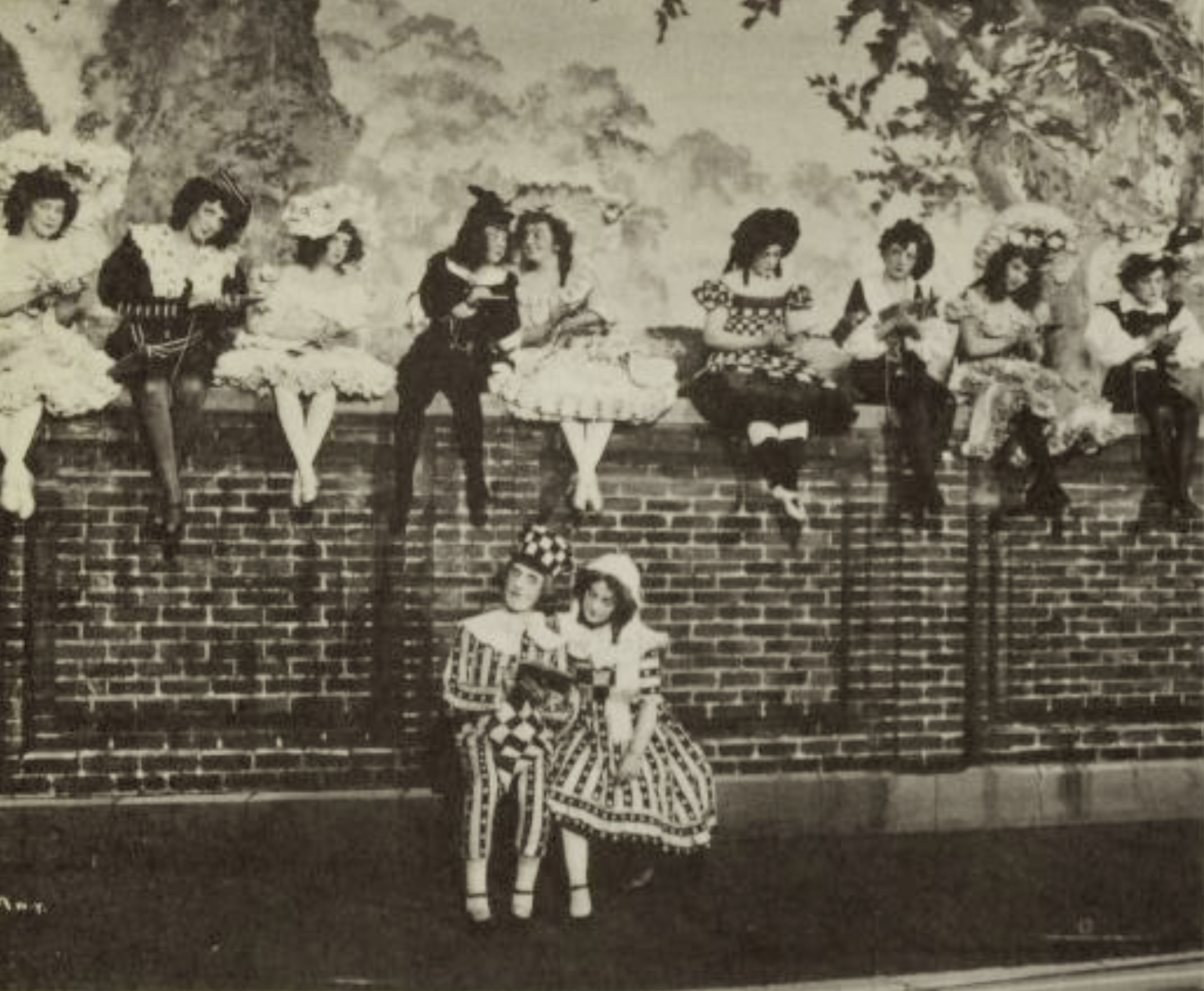
Original 1903 cast performing "I Can't Do the Sum" from Act 1. The chorus percussively tapped chalk on slates during this number.

- Alan, orphaned nephew of Barnaby
- Jane, his sister
- Uncle Barnaby, a rich miser in love with Contrary Mary
- The Widow Piper, a widow with 14 children
- Tom Tom, her eldest son
- Contrary Mary, her eldest daughter, a sweet who looks after village children
- Little Bo-Peep, who is a careless shepherdess
- Peter, who has a passion for pumpkin pie
- Tommy Tucker, who sings for his supper and everything else
- The Master Toymaker, who designs and builds the toys of the world
- Gonzorgo and Roderigo, Barnaby's hired, incompetent ruffians
- Sallie Waters, who wants to get married
- Hilda, the Widow Piper's maid
- Grumio, apprentice to the Master Toymaker
- Inspector Marmaduke, of the Toyland Police
- The Spirit of the Pine and the Spirit of the Oak
- Gertrude, a peasant
- The Moth Queen, the Giant Spider and the Brown Bear
- Jack and Jill, Little Miss Muffet, Curly Locks, Red Riding Hood, Bobby Shaftoe, Simple Simon, Boy Blue, dandies, flower girls, French dolls, Punches, Dutch dolls, toy soldiers, trumpeters, drummers, widows

== Musical numbers ==
Act 1

- ”Prologue” – Alan, Jane, Uncle Barnaby, Gonzorgo and Roderigo
- ”Don't Cry, Bo-Peep (Never Mind, Bo-Peep, We Will Find Your Sheep)” – Bo-Peep, Tom-Tom and Widow Piper's Children
- ”Floretta” – Alan and Chorus
- ”Mary Mary” – Chorus
- ”Barney O'Flynn” – Contrary Mary and Chorus
- ”I Can't Do the Sum” – Jane and Widow Piper's Children
- ”Go to Sleep, Slumber Deep” – Alan, Jane and Wood Spirits
- ”Birth of the Butterfly” – Orchestra

Act 2

- ”Christmas Fair Waltz: Hail to Christmas” – Chorus
- ”The Legend of the Castle” – Gertrude and Chorus
- ”Song of the Poet” (introducing "Rock-a-bye Baby") – Alan and Chorus
- ”March of the Toys” – Ensemble
- ”Military Ball” – Ensemble
- ”In the Toymakers Workshop” – Male Chorus
- ”Toyland” – Tom-Tom and Male Chorus
- ”My Rag Doll Girl” (Eccentric Dance) – Grumio and Jill
- ”Finale Act II” – Master Toymaker, Alan, Uncle Barnaby and Ensemble

Act 3

- ”Hang March” – Orchestra
- ”An Old-Fashioned Rose” – Tom-Tom
- ”Before and After” – Alan and Contrary Mary
- ”Jane” – Jane, Grumio, Gonzorgo and Chorus
- ”Maybe the Moon Will Help You Out” – Bo-Peep

Cut Numbers (Chicago, 1903)

- ”With Downcast Eye” – Tom-Tom and Chorus
- ”The Men” – Contrary Mary
- ”The Healthfood Man” – Gonzorgo and Roderigo
- ”If I Were a Man Like That” – Gonzorgo, Roderigo, Widow Piper
- ”Mignonette” – Tom-Tom

Additional numbers composed 1904–1905

- ”Beatrice Barefacts” – Contrary Mary and Inspector Marmaduke
- ”He Won't Be Happy Till He Gets It” – Jane, Grumio, Gonzorgo and Chorus
- ”Our Castle in Spain” – Tom-Tom
- ”Don't Be a Villain” – Gonzorgo and Roderigo

== Plot synopsis ==
=== 1903 version ===
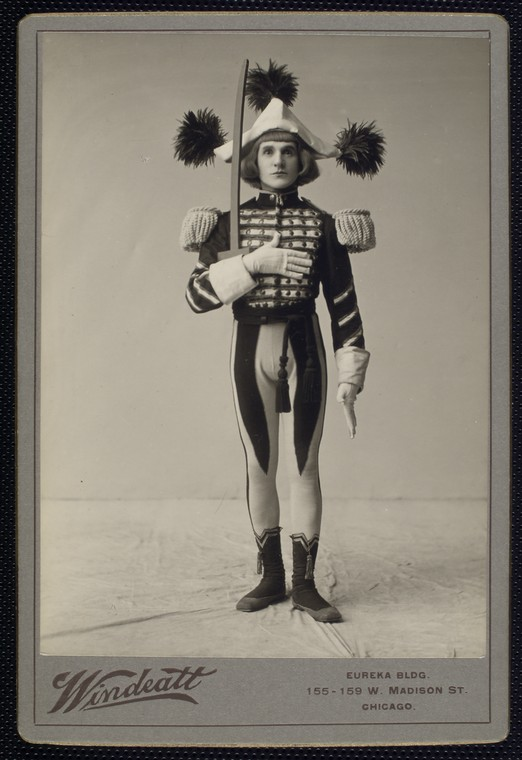
William Norris as a "toy soldier", 1903

Orphans Alan and Jane are the wards of their wicked Uncle Barnaby, who wants to steal their inheritance. He arranges with two sailors, Gonzorgo and Roderigo, for them to be shipwrecked and lost at sea, but they are rescued by gypsies and returned to Contrary Mary's garden. Contrary Mary, the eldest daughter of the Widow Piper, believing her beloved Alan is dead, has run away with her brother, Tom-Tom, rather than agree to marry Barnaby. After a second attempt on their lives, Alan and Jane are abandoned in the Forest of No Return. In the Spider's Den, they are protected by the Moth Queen. Meanwhile, Old Mother Hubbard's shoe is threatened with foreclosure by Barnaby.

Alan and Jane arrive in Toyland, where they find Contrary Mary and Tom-Tom and seek protection from the Master Toymaker, an evil genius who plots with Barnaby to create toys that kill and maim. The demonically possessed dolls turn on the Toymaker, killing him, and Barnaby uses the information to have Alan sentenced to death. Contrary Mary agrees to marry Barnaby in exchange for Alan's pardon, but after he marries her, Barnaby denounces Alan again. Barnaby dies after drinking a wine glass filled with poison meant for Alan. Tom-Tom reveals that an old law of Toyland permitting marriage between a widow and a condemned man on condition that he supports her may save Alan from the gallows. Alan is now free to marry Contrary Mary.

=== 1970s version ===
A new version, first produced in 1975 by the Light Opera of Manhattan with the support of the Victor Herbert Foundation, is more sentimental than the original. Two unhappy children, Jane and Alan, run away from home. Their parents, who are always putting work and discipline before fun, are too busy for them, so the young siblings set out for a place where they will be understood. The children believe that Toyland, a magical land of spirited toys, will deliver them from their hardships. When they arrive, the kindly Toymaker welcomes them with open arms. He warns them not to become too caught up in the fantasy, but soon the toys of Toyland draw them in with their singing and dancing.

The busy parents must find a way to bring the young runaways back home. They send a private eye to search for their children, but this detective sees an opportunity for personal gain in his trip to Toyland; he forces Jane and Alan to help him steal the Toymaker's plans for a new marching toy soldier. When the parents arrive in Toyland via hot air balloon, they too fall under the spell of the mystical land. Arguments break out, toys are wounded, and Jane and Alan get lost and frightened in the dark woods outside of Toyland. As the parents and toys search for the children, the characters and audience alike discover the true meaning of Christmas.

== Recordings ==
Herbert's Victor Herbert Orchestra recorded selections from Babes in Toyland in 1911–1912 for the Victor Talking Machine Company as single releases, including "March of the Toys", "The Toymaker's Shop" and "The Military Ball". Decca Records recorded ten selections from the score (on five 10-inch 78-RPM records) in 1944. The recording featured Kenny Baker and Karen Kemple with a chorus and orchestra conducted by Alexander Smallens. This album was reissued on a 10-inch LP in 1949, and by reducing the selections from ten to six, Decca re-released it on one side of a 12-inch LP (The Red Mill was on the reverse) in 1957. Decca Broadway reissued the complete album on CD (again paired with The Red Mill) in 2002.

The Walt Disney film version, released in 1961, was given two recordings released in the same year. The first was a cover version featuring only Ed Wynn and Ann Jillian from the film, supported by a cast of singers unidentified on the album. This version was released by Disneyland Records. The second used the original vocal tracks from the soundtrack of the film; however, the musical accompaniments and choral arrangements were not those heard in the film, but those heard on the cover version. This album was released on Buena Vista Records and features Wynn, Jillian, Ray Bolger, Henry Calvin, Kevin Corcoran, Annette Funicello and Tommy Sands. Neither one of these albums has been issued on CD.

A stereo recording was made by Reader's Digest for their 1962 album Treasury of Great Operettas. Each of the 24 operettas in the set is condensed to fill one LP side. The recording was conducted by Lehman Engel. A 1963 recording of several of the songs was released together with numbers from The Wizard of Oz (1963 MGM Studio Cast). A shortened version of the operetta was released in 1977. A compilation album was released on CD in 1997. The Reader's Digest recording was released on CD in 2012.

A recording of the complete score, with the original orchestrations restored and conducted by John McGlinn with the London Sinfonietta and the London Voices, was made in 2001. It featured Hugh Panaro as Alan, Korliss Uecker as Jane, Ian Richardson as Barnaby, Valerian Ruminski as Gonzorgo, Elizabeth Futral as Contrary Mary, Rebecca Caine as Tom-Tom and Ian McKellen as the Master Toymaker. It has never been released. A cast recording of the 2003 Rainbow Puppet Productions production of Toyland! was released in 2007, featuring the voice of Mickey Rooney as the Master Toymaker. His wife, Jan Rooney, plays Mother Goose.

== Adaptations ==
=== Children's book ===
A 1904 children's book of the same name by Glen MacDonough and Anna Alice Chapin, with illustrations by Ethel Franklin Betts, is based on the operetta.

=== Films ===
In April 1930, RKO Pictures purchased the screen rights to Babes in Toyland, planning a lavish production to be supervised by William LeBaron and filmed partly in two-strip Technicolor. The cast was reported to include Bert Wheeler and Robert Woolsey, Irene Dunne, Dorothy Lee, Joseph Cawthorn, Edna May Oliver and Ned Sparks. But the widening Great Depression, together with the box office failure of the expensive RKO musical Dixiana and the saturation of the market with film musicals in general, led the studio to suspend production in August 1930, and the film was never made. Hal Roach purchased the screen rights from RKO in November 1933, and on November 29, 1934, Metro-Goldwyn-Mayer released the Roach studio version of Babes in Toyland (later reissued as March of the Wooden Soldiers), with a new plot and retaining only five of Herbert's songs. The film starred Laurel and Hardy, Felix Knight as Tom-Tom, Charlotte Henry as Little Bo-Peep, and Henry Brandon as Silas Barnaby.

Walt Disney's Technicolor 1961 film production starred Bolger, Sands, Funicello, Jillian, Calvin, Gene Sheldon and Ed Wynn. This had a heavily revised plot and new lyrics, but much of the Herbert music was included, although often in altered tempi, and many of the original characters still appeared in the story. A stage version of Babes in Toyland, with a plotline similar to the Disney film has a book by Rebecca Ryland and music and lyrics by Bill Francoeur.

An animated film version, with a new plot and only one of the original songs, was released in 1997 by Metro-Goldwyn-Mayer featuring the voices of Christopher Plummer, James Belushi, Bronson Pinchot and Lacey Chabert.

=== Television ===
Between 1950 and 1960, there were at least three television versions of Babes in Toyland, all broadcast by NBC during the Christmas season. A 1950 version starred Edith Fellows, Robert Weede, and Gil Lamb; Dennis King played a new villain called Dr. Electron. A 1954 adaptation, restaged in 1955, was directed by Max Liebman and starred Jo Sullivan (1954) and Barbara Cook (1955) as Jane and Dennis Day as Tommy, as well as Wally Cox as Grumio, Dave Garroway as Santa, Karin Wolfe as Ann (Jane's little sister) and Jack E. Leonard as Barnaby. Bambi Linn and Rod Alexander were featured dancers, and the production incorporated the Bil Baird marionettes.

A 1960 adaptation for television, produced by William Asher, featured Shirley Temple as the old gypsy Floretta, Angela Cartwright as Jane, Jonathan Winters as Barnaby, and Jerry Colonna, Joe Besser, and Carl Ballantine as his henchmen Gonzales, Roderigo, and Gonzorgo. It was shown as an episode of the anthology series The Shirley Temple Show. The script was written by Jack Brooks and Sheldon Keller, who also contributed a new song. Unlike most of the earlier film and television adaptations, this version retained many elements of the original operetta's plot, focusing on the orphans' escape from their cruel uncle.

A 1986 made for television version featured Drew Barrymore, Pat Morita and Keanu Reeves, only two songs from the Victor Herbert score, a new plot, and many new songs by Leslie Bricusse.

== See also ==
- Parade of the Wooden Soldiers

== Sources ==
- Bloom, Ken and Vlastnik, Frank. Broadway Musicals: The 101 Greatest Shows of All Time. Black Dog & Leventhal Publishers, New York, 2004. ISBN 1-57912-390-2
- Skretvedt, Randy. March of the Wooden Soldiers: The Amazing Story of Laurel and Hardy's "Babes in Toyland". Bonaventure Press, Aliso Viejo, CA, 2023. ISBN 9781937878214
