= The Gay Caballero =

The Gay Caballero may refer to:

- "The Gay Caballero", a 1928 song written by Frank Crumit
- "The Gay Caballero", one of the songs in "The Grand Uproar" from Fleischer Studios
- The Gay Caballero (1932 film), American western directed by Alfred L. Werker
- The Gay Caballero (1940 film), American western directed by Otto Brower
- "The Gay Caballero", a 1959 episode of American TV series Zorro

== See also ==
- The Gay Cavalier (disambiguation)
