= List of Zorro episodes =

List of Zorro episodes may refer to:

- List of Zorro episodes (1957 TV series), episodes of American (Walt Disney Productions) Zorro TV series 1957–59 and specials 1960–61
- List of Zorro episodes (1990 TV series), episodes of American (Family Channel) Zorro TV series 1990–93
- List of Zorro: La Espada y la Rosa episodes, episodes of 2007 Spanish-language telenovela

== See also ==
- Zorro (1957 TV series)
- Zorro (1990 TV series)
- El Zorro, la espada y la rosa, 2007 Telemundo telenovela
