= McDougald =

McDougald is a surname. Notable people with the surname include:

- Elise Johnson McDougald (1885–1971), American educator, writer, and activist
- Gil McDougald (1928–2010), American baseball player
- John A. McDougald (1908–1978), Canadian businessman and racehorse owner
- John McDougald (1848–1919), Canadian merchant and politician
- Junior McDougald (born 1975), American-born English footballer
- Roman McDougald (1907–1960), American writer
- Wilfrid Laurier McDougald (1881–1942), Canadian senator
- Worth McDougald (1925–2007), American academic

== See also ==
- McDougald Township, Lake of the Woods County, Minnesota
- McLendon–McDougald Gymnasium, sports venue in North Carolina, United States
