= Joel Ashley =

American actor (1919–2000)

- Born: Joel Thomas Ashley; April 7, 1919; Atlanta, Georgia, U.S.
- Died: February 23, 2000 (aged 80); Los Angeles, California, U.S.
- Education: Georgia Military Academy; Peekskill Military Academy; Black-Foxe Military Institute; University of California; American Academy of Dramatic Arts
- Occupation: Actor
- Years active: 1935–1979
- Spouse(s): Margalo Francis Wilson (m. 1942; died 1960); Erna Maria Ride (m. 1961; died 1984)
- Children: 2
- Parent: Beulah Ashley

Joel Thomas Ashley (April 7, 1919 – April 7, 2000) was an American character actor of stage, screen and radio, known for his versatility—with stage roles ranging from Abraham Lincoln to Frankenstein's monster, Prince Potemkin, and "Tiny" Tyler (Heywood Broun's unschooled but quick-study star ballplayer)—and for a series of theatrical leading man assignments, opposite Mae West, Elisabeth Bergner, and, most notably, an extended period attached exclusively to Kay Francis. (Note: As authors Lynn Kear and John Rossman make clear in their 2006 biography, Kay Francis: A Passionate Life and Career, during the period in question (circa 1948 to 1951), this attachment was equal parts professional and personal, much to the chagrin of the former actress to whom Ashley was then married, Margalo Francis Wilson.)

== Early life and career ==
Born April 7, 1919, in Atlanta, Georgia, son of actress and script supervisor Beulah Ashley [née Rodgers], Joel Ashley never knew his father and, for the better part of his pre-adult life, resided either at military boarding schools—primarily Georgia Military Academy, Peekskill Military Academy, and, later, the Black-Foxe Military Institute—or with his mother's family in Macon.

In either 1934 or early the next year (following the marriage of her sister, actress Barbara Rogers [née Emma Lee Rodgers], to Warner Brothers executive William Koenig), Beulah brought her son to Los Angeles, where, on or just after his sixteenth birthday, Ashley made his Tinseltown stage debut—with backstage assists from both Beulah and Barbara—at Hollywood Military Academy, portraying Jim Hunter in Aunt Julia's Pearls, a three-act comedy penned by Boston-based educator and sometime playwright Hope Hearn Moulton.

Meanwhile, the Rogers-Koenig connection appears to have facilitated the film debuts—albeit uncredited—of both Ashleys, his mother doing rewrites on Warner Brothers' new James Cagney film, G Men, and Joel as the stunt double powering novice swashbuckler Errol Flynn's breakout performance in that same studio's box-office hit, Captain Blood. The roundabout way in which Ashley actually landed this job is revealed in an anecdote related nine years later by Richmond Independent entertainment writer L. L. Stevenson.

Joel Ashley, who played the young lead opposite Margaret Lindsay in 'Another Love Story,' was well started in the films before he joined the Marines a couple of years ago. His first chance came when he was working with Warner Bros. as a studio electrician. One day he slid down a rope, from the top of the stage practically into the lap of Michael Curtiz, the director. Instead of bawling him out, Curtiz promptly signed Ashley for a part in the picture he was making. It seems that he had been searching for actors who could slide down the rigging of a ship and Ashley, all unconsciously, had given an exhibition of what he could do in that line. In short, he slid right into the movies.

In fact, judging from a San Francisco Examiner piece published two years later still, what Ashley had slid into was a whole slew of very much the same type of assignment—i.e. stunt doubling. By his own account (which, to be clear, makes no mention of Blood, nor any of the specific titles in question), Ashley's film appearances during this period totaled about 20, and comprised a portion of his career best forgotten. For the record, three of these in which Ashley's appearance received at least a passing press mention are the musical comedy Top of the Town (1937), the romantic drama, I Met My Love Again (1938), and the adventure comedy/buddy film Girl from Havana (1940). During this initial Hollywood tour, Ashley also worked in radio at least once, when, in August 1937, he was heard on KMTR in Los Angeles, appearing in the 15-minutes playlet, "Interference".

In June 1938, after paying his grandparents a visit in Macon, Ashley moved to New York, where he worked in summer stock and later attended the American Academy of Dramatic Arts. He also got his first taste of Broadway, "carrying a spear" in Kaufman and Hart's The American Way, starring Frederic March and Florence Eldridge. During this period, he also worked as a stevedore and a model for John Robert Powers.

Following his graduation from the AADA in 1940, Ashley joined the newly formed Hollywood Group Theater (modeled after its New York namesake), along with playwright Alfred Gehri, musical director Lou Halmy, art director Pierre Marquet, and actors such as Judith Allen, Sig Arno, Iphigenie Castigliani, Ann Lee, and Ernő Verebes. For its initial offering, on Monday, June 3, the Group presented the American debut of Gehri's Sixth Floor, described as a French Grand Hotel, set in Paris, presenting "a kaleidoscopic picture of several apartments in a rooming house in Montmartre", with Ashley deemed "debonairly handsome as the gay Lothario".

That summer, Ashley began a stateside stint with the United States Marines, cut short, circa August 1941, by a freak injury, leaving him with damaged knees and an honorable discharge. By December of that year, Ashley had landed a small role in playwright Myron Fagan's new work, To Live Again, which opened December 29 at the Belasco Theater in Los Angeles. He next worked in summer stock, a 14-week season, beginning in June 1942, at Baltimore's Vagabond Theater. Due to the wartime dearth of qualified candidates, Ashley became the resident leading man in a company that also featured his newly wed wife, Margalo Wilson. The season opened with Noël Coward's Fallen Angels, starring Ashley as Frederick Sterroll.

In December 1942, Ashley made his well received Broadway debut alongside Claudia Morgan, as "Tiny" Tyler in The Sun Field, adapted by Milton Lazarus from the like-named 1923 Heywood Broun novel. The adaptation itself, however, was not so well received, and even before the weekly trade paper, Variety, could publish its opening night review (which it proceeded to do nonetheless, "for the record"), the play had closed after five performances.

Reviewing his performance in Margaret Vale's The Two Mrs. Carrolls, as the "morbid artist husband" of Elisabeth Bergner, Globe and Mail' critic Colin Sabiston, while acknowledging Bergner's genius as the production's central and defining asset, dubbed Ashley's portrayal "a really masterly piece of work."

One month later, with the Mrs. Carrolls tour still underway, Ashley's upcoming screen debut was announced by The Hollywood Reporter, naming him the most recent addition to Purgatory Street, Universal International's screen adaptation of the new novel by mystery writer Roman McDougald, to be directed by Sam Wood. However, following another six months of related news stories, Wood finally announced in December that he was dropping the project, owing to his inability to achieve the desired casting. In September 1949, Ashley was on the verge of making that long-awaited debut alongside his then leading lady Kay Francis—who would simultaneously be making her TV debut—on the series Chevrolet Tele-Theater. At the last minute, Francis backed out, reportedly "on orders of her physician"; her co-star promptly followed suit. Ashley's own debut was finally made the following February, on the recently converted radio series, Lights Out.

Ashley's subsequent stage portrayal of Joe Webber, the semi-autobiographical protagonist of Thomas Wolfe's The Web and the Rock, was rated by Variety's Russ, "the top portrayal of his career."

Type-cast for several seasons as the pleasant leading man to the distaff stars, he takes full advantage of his opportunities in playing the egotistical, petulant, selfish, childish and bewildered novelist. His best scene is toward the play's close, relating his inner struggles to reach the unfathomable in life.

Unlike his ongoing stage career, Ashley's decade-plus string of big and small screen credits—which, apart from his 1967 swan song,—took place entirely between the years 1950 and 1960—was composed primarily of minor roles, sometimes uncredited, frequently in westerns, and often as one of the villains. In one such instance, specifically his final feature film appearance (as Murch in the 1959 western, Warlock), Ashley was a last-minute replacement in October 1958, following the plane crash that took the life of character actor Ed Hinton.

Series in which Ashley made multiple appearances include Gunsmoke, Have Gun Will Travel, Death Valley Days, Wagon Train, Sheriff of Cochise, and The Lone Ranger. He also had a recurring role, Trooper Boone, in the series Boots and Saddles.

== Personal life and death ==
Ashley was married twice: from 1942 until 1960, to fellow actress Margalo Francis Wilson(with whom he had two children, both daughters), and, from 1961 through 1974, to Erna Maria Rade; each marriage ended with the death of his spouse. For more than a decade, shortly thereafter, Ashley's "companion" was Connie Lee Egan, ending with her death in 1998, preceded by the death in 1997 of the younger of his two daughters, Professor Laurel Ashley Peterson.

Survived by daughter Margalo Ashley-Ferrand, and by eight grandchildren, Ashley died in Los Angeles on April 7, 2000, his 81st birthday.

== Filmography ==
=== Film ===
- Captain Blood (1935) – Stunt double for Errol Flynn (uncredited)
- Top of the Town (1937) – Stunt double (uncredited)
- I Met My Love Again (1938) – Stunt double (uncredited)
- Girl from Havana (1940) – Stunt double (uncredited)
- Crime Against Joe (1956) – Philip Rowen
- Ghost Town (1956) – Sgt. Ben Dockery
- The Broken Star (1956) – Messendyke
- Rebel in Town (1956) – Doctor
- The Vagabond King (1956) – Duke of Normandy
- Tension at Table Rock (1956) – Svenson Brink (uncredited)
- The Ten Commandments (1956) – Taskmaster (uncredited)
- Rumble on the Docks (1956) – Fuller
- Zombies of Mora Tau (1957) – George Harrison
- Warlock (1959) – Murch (uncredited)

=== Television ===
- Lights Out
  - Ep. Dead Pigeon (1950)
- The Plainclothesman
  - Ep. "Smoked Ham" (1950)
- Martin Kane
  - Ep. "Movie Theater Murder" (1951) – Ed Daley
- Famous Jury Trials
  - Ep. "State vs. Ben Hutchins" (1951)
  - Ep. "People vs. Stanley Forrest" (1951)
  - Ep. "State vs. Paul Bedford" (1951)
- Lux Video Theatre
  - "The Sire de Maletroit's Door" (1951) – Captain Philip de Chartier
  - "Consider the Lilies" (1951) – Myles
  - "Death Do Us Part" (1957) – Warren
- Hands of Mystery
  - Ep. "Hello Captain" (1952)
- Mrs. Thanksgiving TV movie (1952)
- Rocky King, Detective
  - Ep. "Murder on the Doorstep" (1952)
  - Ep. "Room Service" (1953)
- Hollywood Television Theater
  - Ep. "The Letter" (1952)
- Dark of Night
  - Ep. 1.17 (1953)
- Studio 57
  - Ep. "One Kiss Too Many" (1955) – Frank Moran
- Cameo Theatre
  - Ep. "The Whisper of a Witness" (1955) – Marty Curtis
- Tales of the Texas Rangers
  - Ep. "The Atomic Trail" (1955) – Fred Douglas
- Brave Eagle
  - Ep. "Code of a Chief" (1955) – Jefferson Garrick Lomax
- The Cisco Kid
  - Ep. "School Marm" (1955) – Mr. Bond
  - Ep. "Gold, Death and Dynamite" (1955) – Henchman Clem"
- Jungle Jim
  - Ep. "The Avenger " (1956) – Stacy
- Cheyenne
  - "Rendezvous at Red Rock" (1956) – Clayton
  - "Dead to Rights" (1958) – Sheriff Benton
- Gunsmoke
  - Ep. "The Big Broad" (1956) – Nate
  - Ep. "Chester's Mail Order Bride" (1956) – Linus
  - Ep. "No Indians" (1956) – Jake
  - Ep. "The Constable" (1959) – 2nd Cowboy
- The Adventures of Rin Tin Tin
  - Ep. "Hubert Goes West" (1956) – Hugh Marsh
- Annie Oakley
  - Ep. "Sundown Stage" (1956) – Jack Dixon
  - Ep. "The Dutch Gunmaker" (1957) – John Reed
- Celebrity Playhouse
  - Ep. "Dark Legacy" (1956)
- Father Knows Best
  - Ep. "The Great Guy" (1956) – Matt
- Chevron Hall of Stars
  - Ep. "Blood and Stain" (1956) – Bert
- Death Valley Days
  - Ep. "The Hidden Treasure of Cucamonga" (1956) – Don Tiburcio
  - Ep. "The Wind at Your Back" (1960) – Forbes Buckner
  - Ep. "Feud at Dome Rock" (1962) – Mr. Waterbury
- The Lone Ranger
  - ""The Courage of Tonto" (1957) – Lew Pearson
- State Trooper
  - Ep. "The Black Leaper" (1957) – Jeffrey Story
- The Man Called X
  - Ep. "Forged Documents" (1957)
- Colt .45
  - Ep. "The $3,000 Dollar Bullet" (1957) – Luke Danson
- Sergeant Preston of the Yukon
  - Ep. "The Old Timer" (1957) Curley
- Boots and Saddles
  - Ep. "The Marquis of Donnybrook" (1957) – Pvt. Ashley [sic]
  - Ep. "The Last Word" (1958) – Pvt. Boone
  - Ep. "Rescue of a Stranger" (1958) – Pvt. Boone
  - Ep. "The Superstition (1958) – Pvt. Boone
  - Ep. "The Captain's Leave" (1958) – Pvt. Boone
  - Ep. "The Decision" (1958) – Pvt. Boone
- Zane Grey Theatre
  - Ep. "Man Unforgiving" (1958) – Sam Baker
- Tales of Wells Fargo
  - Ep. "The Sooners" (1958) – Dev Horgan
  - Ep. "Moment of Glory" (1961) – Bart Dillon
- Harbor Command
  - Ep. "Desperate Men" (1958) – Tom Mitchell
- Jefferson Drum
  - Ep. "A Matter of Murder" (1958) – Vardo
- The Restless Gun
  - Ep. "Day of the Dragon" (1958) – Sheriff Bob Berryman
- Flight
  - Ep. "The Hard Way" (1958)
- M Squad
  - Ep. "The Widows" (1958) Arthur Wendell Cane
- Frontier Doctor
  - Ep. "Iron Trail Ambush" (1958) – Perry Collins
- Target
  - Ep. "Taps for the General" (1958)
- Have Gun Will Travel
  - Ep. "A Snare for Murder" (1958) – Jack Martin
  - Ep. "Unforgiven" (1959) – Caterall - Crommer Foe
- Wagon Train
  - Ep. " The Clint McCullough Story" (1959) – Captain
- Black Saddle
  - Ep. "Client: Steele" (1959) – Barnes
- Bat Masterson
  - Ep. "The Secret Is Death" (1959) – Sam Grovenor
- Law of the Plainsman
  - Ep. "Full Circle" (1959) – Calhoun
- Goodyear Theatre
  - Ep. "The Incorrigibles" (1959) – F.X. Kennelly
- Bonanza
  - Ep. "The Outcast" (1960) – Boyd
- The Alaskans
  - Ep. "The Long Pursuit" (1960) – Mr. Elkins
- Shotgun Slade
  - Ep. "A Plate of Death" (1960)
- Daniel Boone
  - Ep. "The Long Way Home" (1967) – General Harmer
