= Babes in Toyland (1961 film) =

1961 Disney film by Jack Donohue

- Theatrical release poster
- Directed by: Jack Donohue
- Screenplay by: Ward Kimball; Joe Rinaldi; Lowell S. Hawley
- Based on: Babes in Toyland by Victor Herbert and Glen MacDonough
- Produced by: Walt Disney
- Starring: Ray Bolger; Tommy Sands; Annette Funicello; Ed Wynn; Tommy Kirk; Kevin Corcoran; Henry Calvin; Gene Sheldon
- Cinematography: Edward Colman
- Edited by: Robert Stafford
- Music by: George Bruns (Note: Adaptation and conducting); Mel Leven (Note: Lyrics and introductory material)
- Production company: Walt Disney Productions
- Distributed by: Buena Vista Distribution
- Release date: December 14, 1961
- Running time: 105 minutes
- Country: United States
- Language: English
- Budget: $3 million
- Box office: $4.6 million (US and Canada rentals)

Babes in Toyland is a 1961 American Christmas musical fantasy film directed by Jack Donohue and produced by Walt Disney Productions. It stars Ray Bolger as Barnaby, Tommy Sands as Tom Piper, Annette Funicello as Mary Contrary, and Ed Wynn as the Toymaker.

The film is based on Victor Herbert's 1903 operetta Babes in Toyland. There had been a 1934 film also titled Babes in Toyland starring Laurel and Hardy, and three television adaptations prior to the Disney film, but Disney's was only the second film version of the operetta released theatrically and the first in Technicolor. The plot, and in some cases the music, bear little resemblance to the original, as Disney had most of the lyrics rewritten and some of the song tempos drastically changed, including the memorable song "Toyland", a slow ballad, which was sped up with only the chorus sung in a march-like rhythm. The toy soldiers later appeared in Christmas parades at the Disney theme parks around the world. Funicello said it was her favorite filmmaking experience.

== Plot ==
The inhabitants of Mother Goose Village celebrate the upcoming marriage of Tom Piper and Mary Contrary. The miserly and villainous Barnaby recruits two henchmen, dimwitted Gonzorgo and silent Roderigo, to throw Tom into the sea and steal Mary's sheep, depriving her of her means of support, to force her to marry Barnaby. Mary is unaware that she is the heiress to a fortune, but Barnaby is aware and wants it all for himself. After knocking Tom out, Gonzorgo and Roderigo decide to sell him to Gypsies instead of drowning him, in order to collect a double payment.

The next day, Gonzorgo and Roderigo tell Mary, Barnaby, and the villagers that Tom has accidentally drowned. They show Mary a forged letter in which Tom tells Mary he is abandoning her, and she would be better off marrying Barnaby. Mary, believing she is destitute, reluctantly accepts Barnaby's proposal. Barnaby unknowingly arranges for the same Gypsies who have Tom to provide entertainment for the wedding. Tom, disguised as the Gypsy Floretta, reveals himself, and Barnaby berates Gonzorgo and Roderigo for their deception.

One of the children who live with Mary informs her of some sheep tracks leading into the Forest of No Return. The children sneak away into the forest to search for the missing sheep. The trees of the forest awaken and capture them. When Tom and Mary find the children in the forest, the trees instantly return to their motionless state. Tom, Mary, and the children camp for the night. In the morning, the trees once again come to life and explain that they are on private Toyland property and must appear before the Toymaker, the Mayor and Chief of Police of Toyland. Tom, Mary, and the children happily continue on, escorted part of the way by the trees.

Through the windows of the Toymaker's house, they watch the Toymaker's brilliant apprentice, Grumio, present a new machine that makes toys without any manual labor. Overjoyed, the Toymaker speeds up the machine to such a high rate that it explodes, destroying every toy in the factory. Tom, Mary, and the children offer to help make more toys in time for Christmas.

Grumio presents a shrinking "gun" filled with red liquid that reduces everyday objects to toy size. He warns that two doses of the red liquid will cause the shrunken object to disappear completely. The Toymaker is initially delighted, until Tom points out the impossibility of finding enough life-sized objects to shrink down into the large quantity of toys needed for Christmas. The Toymaker berates Grumio for his stupidity and throws the shrinking gun out the window in disgust.

Barnaby, who has been spying on them, uses the discarded shrinking gun to shrink the Toymaker. As Barnaby plans to shrink Tom, Gonzorgo and Roderigo attempt to defect from Barnaby, but Barnaby shrinks the two and imprison them in a birdcage. Barnaby then shrinks Tom and forces Mary to marry him by threatening to eliminate Tom, while the Toymaker is forced to preside over the wedding ceremony.

During the ceremony, Tom slips away and returns with an army of toy soldiers to fight Barnaby. Barnaby easily defeats the toy soldiers with a toy cannon. He prepares to obliterate Tom with another dose from the shrinking gun, but Mary destroys it with the toy cannon. The liquid splatters all over Barnaby and shrinks him to toy size. Tom challenges Barnaby to a sword duel and ultimately knocks him into an empty toybox.

Grumio rushes in with a new invention that returns miniaturized people and objects to their original size. He immediately uses it on the Toymaker, Gonzorgo, and Roderigo. Grumio is about to use it on Tom, but after reminding Grumio that he is the head toymaker and that Grumio is just his assistant, the Toymaker uses the invention himself to return Tom to his natural size.

Some time later, Tom and Mary's wedding is attended by all of Mother Goose Village, including the trees from the Forest of No Return. The newlyweds then drive off in a horse-drawn sleigh.

== Cast ==
- Ray Bolger as Barnaby
- Tommy Sands as Tom Piper
- Annette Funicello (credited as Annette) as Mary Contrary
- Ed Wynn as Toymaker
- Tommy Kirk as Grumio
- Kevin Corcoran as Boy Blue
- Henry Calvin as Gonzorgo
- Gene Sheldon as Roderigo
- Mary McCarty as Mother Goose
- Ann Jillian as Bo Peep
- Brian Corcoran as Willie Winkie

Uncredited

- Marilee and Melanie Arnold as twin 1 and 2
- Jerry Glenn as Simple Simon
- John Perri as Jack-Be-Nimble
- David Pinson as Bobby Shaftoe
- Bryan Russell as the little boy
- James Martin as Jack
- Ilana Dowding as Jill
- Jack Donohue as Sylvester J. Goose (voice)
- Robert Banas as Russian dancer
- Eileen Diamond as dancer
- Bess Flowers as villager
- Jeannie Russell as singer (voice)

== Production ==
=== Development ===
In 1934, Walt Disney previously approved the appearance of Mickey Mouse in Metro-Goldwyn-Mayer's 1934 film along with the use of the song "Who's Afraid of the Big Bad Wolf?", but was otherwise not involved in that adaptation.

In May 1955, announced that he would produce Babes in Toyland as an animated feature. By October 1956, Disney had assigned Bill Walsh to produce and Sidney Miller to direct the project. However, filming was delayed, and by August 1959, the project was retooled as a live-action television movie, making it Disney's first live-action musical. Ward Kimball had been tapped to produce and direct the project, while Mel Leven would write new lyrics.

With Kimball in charge, he reviewed the three scripts that had been written, all of which he found to be "terrible, absolutely nothing". Kimball had found the 1903 operetta script to be too complicated. In his script, he excised the orphans subplot and focused the story on a love triangle between Tom, Mary Contrary, and Barnaby. In the following months, Kimball worked alongside story artist Joe Rinaldi and effects animator Joshua Meador to ensure the film would be visually interesting. In June 1960, Disney told the Los Angeles Times: "We're updating the lyrics; the music, of course, is Victor Herbert's. March of the Toys will be done in animation. I'll be using fantasy with 'live' more and more. I've decided people should play people and shouldn't be animated – only the effects should."

While Disney was vacationing in Europe, Kimball was finalizing set designs and casting decisions, the latter of which required Disney's approval. "We decided on Ray Bolger, things like that, and [such decisions usually] were the provinces of Walt," Kimball later explained. Furthermore, with the studio's option on the film rights set to expire within a year, a studio publicist placed trade advertisements that promoted Kimball's work on the film, leading to Disney deciding that Kimball had got above himself. Kimball was also traveling to New York to scout for Broadway actors to cast in the film. According to Joe Hale, Kimball had wanted one actress for Mary, but Disney had insisted on Annette Funicello. Further casting disagreements led to Kimball being kicked off the film.

In January 1961, Jack Donohue was signed to direct, following his success on Broadway directing Top Banana and Mr. Wonderful, and for his work on TV specials for Dean Martin and Frank Sinatra. While Kimball would still be credited as the screenwriter, he was relegated to directing the 15-minute toy soldier sequence. In March 1961, Disney said he wanted to create a film of the standard of The Wizard of Oz (1939). "It's like a Disney cartoon only with live actors", said one Disney executive.

=== Casting ===
In September 1960, it was reported that Disney had wanted to discuss Dean Jones for the lead role as Tom. By January 1961, Ray Bolger was cast as a villain for the first time in his career. Gene Sheldon, best known for his role of Bernardo in the Spanish Western television series Zorro, appeared alongside his Zorro co-star, Henry Calvin. Tommy Kirk played a supporting role. According to Annette Funicello, Tommy Sands beat out Michael Callan and James Darren to play the male lead.

=== Filming ===
Principal photography started on March 13, 1961, and was scheduled for three months. Preparation, rehearsing and pre-recording took three months. Tommy Kirk said he enjoyed making the film because of the opportunity to work with Ed Wynn:

I thought he was delightful and so did everyone else. You couldn't not like him. He was completely crazy and he was just as crazy offscreen as he was on. But it was all, of course, an act. He was a very serious, religious man in his own way, but he loved playing Ed Wynn, the perfect fool, the complete nut. And he was good at it. Actually I think the movie is sort of a klunker, especially when I compare it to the Laurel and Hardy Babes in Toyland. It's not a great film but it has a few cute moments. It's an oddity. But I'm not embarrassed about it like I am about some other movies I've made.

Funicello had a bad experience with William Fairchild, who had directed her in The Horsemasters (1961), but found Jack Donahue to be "simply wonderful." She also enjoyed the fact "it was the first, and unfortunately, I think, the last time I made a movie in which I actually danced something besides the Watusi or the swim."

Kirk said: "The whole movie is, to me, lopsided. It's not a good film; it doesn't quite come off. It has cute stuff in it, but a lot of it's a mess."

== Songs ==
Title	Music by	Music adapted by	Lyrics by	Sung by
"Mother Goose Village and Lemonade"	Victor Herbert	George Bruns "Mother Goose Village" adapted from musical piece Country Dance "Lemonade" adapted from musical piece Military Ball	Mel Leven	Chorus
"We Won't Be Happy Till We Get It"	Victor Herbert	George Bruns from He Won't Be Happy Till He Gets It	Mel Leven	Ray Bolger, Henry Calvin and danced by Gene Sheldon
"Just a Whisper Away"	Victor Herbert	George Bruns	Mel Leven	Tommy Sands and Annette Funicello
"Slowly He Sank to the Bottom of the Sea"	George Bruns		Mel Leven	Henry Calvin & danced by Gene Sheldon
"Castle in Spain"	Victor Herbert	George Bruns	Mel Leven	Ray Bolger (who also dances)
"Never Mind, Bo-Peep"	Victor Herbert	George Bruns	Mel Leven	Ann Jillian and chorus
"I Can't Do the Sum"	Victor Herbert	George Bruns	Mel Leven	Annette Funicello
"Floretta"	Victor Herbert	George Bruns	Mel Leven	Tommy Sands and Chorus
"Forest of No Return"	Victor Herbert	George Bruns from The Spider's Den	Mel Leven	Chorus, Singing trees, and children
"Go to Sleep"	Victor Herbert	George Bruns from Go to Sleep, Slumber Deep	Mel Leven	Tommy Sands, Annette Funicello, and children
"Toyland"	Victor Herbert	George Bruns	Mel Leven and Glen MacDonough	Tommy Sands, Annette Funicello, children and Singing trees
"Workshop Song"	Victor Herbert	George Bruns from In The Toymaker's Workshop	Mel Leven	Ed Wynn, Tommy Sands, Annette Funicello, and children
"Just a Toy"	Victor Herbert	George Bruns	Mel Leven	Tommy Sands and Annette Funicello
"March of the Toys"	Victor Herbert			Orchestra
"Tom and Mary"	Victor Herbert	George Bruns from Hail to Christmas	Mel Leven	Wedding guests

== Release ==
In conjunction with the film's release, Babes in Toyland was prominently featured on the television series The Wonderful World of Color, with an episode titled "Backstage Party" airing on December 17, 1961. It was presented in two parts on The Wonderful World of Disney on December 21 and December 27, 1969.

=== Home media ===
The film was released on DVD on September 3, 2002, by Walt Disney Studios Home Entertainment. It was released on Blu-ray on December 11, 2012. It's also available on Disney+ in the US as of 2025 not all countries like the UK.

== Reception ==
=== Box office ===
Babes in Toyland earned $4.6 million in rentals from the United States and Canada.

=== Critical response ===
A. H. Weiler of The New York Times wrote in his review: "Let us say that Walt Disney's packaging of Victor Herbert's indestructible operetta is a glittering color and song and dance-filled bauble artfully designed for the tastes of the sub-teen set. Adults would have to be awfully young in mind to accept these picture-book caperings of the Mother Goose coterie as stirring stuff. This Toyland is closer to Disneyland, but who ever heard of an adult winning an argument on that issue?" Variety described the film as "an expensive gift, brightly-wrapped and intricately-packaged and is certain to be a fast-selling item in the Yuletide marketplace. A choice attraction for the pre-teen set, it will be an especially big draw among those in the five-to-ten age bracket." However, the review cautioned that older audiences "may be distressed to discover that quaint, charming 'Toyland' has been transformed into a rather gaudy and mechanical 'Fantasyland.' What actually emerged is 'Babes in Disneyland.'"

John L. Scott, reviewing for the Los Angeles Times, felt the film was "considerably more showy than either Herbert's stage original or the first film version done in the middle 30's; and older patrons may resent a loss of quaintness and a surplus of fantasy-whimsy. Nevertheless, the lavish, tinseled picture is a fine, appropriate holiday attraction for all but the sophisticated moviegoer." Harrison's Reports praised the film as "VERY GOOD", and further acknowledged Walt Disney for having "wrapped this one up in gay silk ribbons, beautiful costumes and brilliant splashes of color the envy of the rainbow rangers. Like a tender father, Disney has put this together with the soft sensitivity of a man in whose trust has been placed the dream world of trusting youngsters everywhere." Time wrote Babes in Toyland was "a wonderful piece of entertainment for children under five, but children over five who plan to see it will be well advised to take some Berlitz brushup lessons in baby talk." Additionally, the review was also critical for the modernized music, but praised the March of the Toys sequence.

On the review aggregator website Rotten Tomatoes, the film holds an approval rating of 36% based on 11 reviews, with an average rating of 5/10.

=== Disney's "Babes in Toyland Soldiers" ===
Among the most significant legacies of the film has been its influence on Disney's theme parks worldwide. The Babes in Toyland sets were showcased in Disneyland Park as an attraction following the film's release and the Toy Soldiers became an iconic symbol of the holidays at Disneyland, Walt Disney World Resort and other Disney Parks around the world, considered a "draw" and featured heavily in television, online and print advertising rivaling the castles and the famous Disney characters in appearances. Disney's Babes in Toyland Soldiers are the equivalent of the Rockettes' appearance at the Macy's Thanksgiving Day Parade in that park guests and TV viewers expect to see them every year.

The soldiers also appear in the stop-motion nursery sequence in Walt Disney's 1964 film Mary Poppins. They were designed by Disney animator and Imagineer Bill Justice, who with fellow Imagineer X Atencio, created the sequence in the film. Justice designed the park soldiers to match the Babes in Toyland movie soldiers exactly as they appeared in the 1961 film. They made their television debut on Walt Disney's Wonderful World of Color when Walt Disney presented the Disneyland Christmas parade in the episode "Holiday Time at Disneyland".

== See also ==
- List of Christmas films

== Bibliography ==
- Funicello, Annette; Romanowski, Patricia (1994). A Dream Is a Wish Your Heart Makes: My Story. New York: Hyperion. ISBN 978-0-786-88092-8.
- Pierce, Todd James (2019). The Life and Times of Ward Kimball: Maverick of Disney Animation. University Press of Mississippi. ISBN 978-1-496-82096-9.
