= Peter Peter =

Peter Peter may refer to:

- Peter Peter (Canadian musician) (born 1984), Canadian singer-songwriter
- Peter Peter (Danish musician) (born 1960), former member of the Danish rock band Sort Sol (formerly SODS)

== See also ==
- Peter Peter Pumpkin Eater
