= Walt Disney Treasures =

Limited edition 2-disc DVD collections

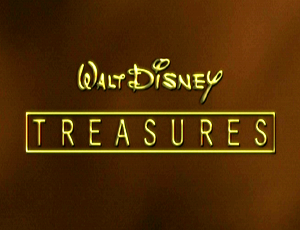
Walt Disney Treasures promotional title card

"The Ultimate Disney Treasure Chest": Costco-exclusive repackaged box set of the first two waves without the tin cases

Walt Disney Treasures is a series of two-disc DVD collections of Disney cartoons, television episodes and other material curated and distributed by Walt Disney Studios Home Entertainment. They cover material from the studio's earliest days to its more recent work. There were nine waves, each containing two to four sets, for a total of 30 titles. All content is presented uncensored and uncut with digitally restored picture and remastered sound (except where noted on individual titles).

== Overview ==
In 2000, Leonard Maltin met with the then-chairman of Walt Disney Studios, Dick Cook at several studio screenings and press events. Cook and Maltin became friends, and one day at a breakfast meeting, Maltin pitched the idea of a collector-orientated series showcasing classic Disney shorts. As he said: "You're putting out all of these cartoons willy nilly on VHS. Why not do them in a more organized way? That way, you will get the collectors, Disney buffs, and families and kids." Cook enthusiastically responded, "Let's do it."

The first wave was released to Region 1 DVD on December 4, 2001, as a part of the celebration of Walt Disney's 100th birthday. They were sold in limited quantities. The numbered units are largely commercially unavailable. Only a handful of these titles have been sold outside Region 1.

Maltin hosted and curated the sets, and appears in each disc of every set to introduce the collection. Maltin insisted that all content on the discs be presented uncut and uncensored, and that certain shorts containing politically incorrect material be proceeded by an introduction with Maltin putting them into historical context rather than editing or censoring them. Maltin's tactic of using disclaimers for problematic content proved revolutionary within the home entertainment industry, and was later adopted by Warner Bros. for the release of their classic animation collections; first with introductions by Whoopi Goldberg at the beginning of each disc for Looney Tunes Golden Collection: Volume 3 and Tom and Jerry Spotlight Collection: Volume 2 sets, and text disclaimers on further volumes. In 2020, Disney+ adopted the use of text disclaimers on certain films such as Dumbo and Peter Pan, and Warner Bros. provided an introduction by Jacqueline Stewart on the streaming release of Gone with the Wind.

Most of the sets are available in Europe (Region 2) except The Mickey Mouse Club Presents: Annette; The Complete First and Second Seasons of Zorro; Dr. Syn: The Scarecrow of Romney Marsh; The Chronological Donald Volume Four; Disneyland: Secrets; Stories and Magic; Your Host, Walt Disney; The Complete Pluto Volume Two; Elfego Baca and the Swamp Fox; The Hardy Boys: The Mystery of the Applegate Treasure; The Adventures of Spin & Marty (The Mickey Mouse Club); More Silly Symphonies; Disney Rarities: Celebrated Shorts: 1920s–1960s; Davy Crockett; Tomorrowland; Disneyland U.S.A and On the Front Lines. In Japan, more of the sets were produced for the Japanese market in Region 2, along with sets that are available in Europe: The Chronological Donald Volume Four, The Complete Pluto Volume Two, Disney Rarities: Celebrated Shorts: 1920s–1960s, Disneyland: Secrets, Stories and Magic and More Silly Symphonies. In Brazil, only five Walt Disney Treasures sets have been released: the two Mickey Mouse in Living Color volumes, Silly Symphonies, The Chronological Donald, Volume One, and The Adventures of Oswald the Lucky Rabbit, with those releases (with the exception of Oswald) also being released in Mexico. In Australia and New Zealand (Region 4) four sets were made available; the two Mickey Mouse in Living Color volumes, Silly Symphonies and The Chronological Donald, Volume One. The Mickey Mouse cartoon Runaway Brain is available on the Walt Disney Treasures: Mickey Mouse in Living Color: Volume 2 sets in France, Brazil, Mexico, Japan and Australia. These are the only internationally released sets featuring the cartoon.

Each set contains two discs. The general theme of the Walt Disney Treasures line was to release content Walt Disney was personally involved with that was not directly tied to a feature film, though this was not strictly followed. While early waves featured the same introduction video by Leonard Maltin, later sets featured a unique introduction for each disc, with Maltin describing the material on the specific disc. The presentation of the content changed greatly as waves kept being produced. Early sets had a custom user interface for each disc, with no standard menu navigation. This strategy was phased out in favor of a more standardized design of content being ordered both chronologically and alphabetically, or by episode order. Commentary tracks and other versions were available next to the content itself. Bonus features were in a dedicated menu, as well as some sets featuring a "From the Vault" menu containing content deemed inappropriate by today's standards. Early sets also contained Easter eggs, where content is hidden and only accessible through navigating a menu a specific way. These were phased out due to negative feedback. Early sets also contained a "Leonard's Picks" section, but these were simply another way to access certain pieces of content and were dropped due to redundancy.

Leonard Maltin would appear frequently before a feature, describing its cultural significance or an interesting aspect of its origin. For the "From the Vault" section, he would detail problematic aspects of the content. He makes sure to emphasize that this content was made during a time when things now considered offensive and unacceptable were considered normal and expected. This content was wrong then and is still wrong today, but Maltin believes having it be freely available with proper context provided would help us learn from our past, as to pretend the content never existed is the same as saying the past never happened.

Each set has been packaged in a numbered tin case. The first two waves featured numbers stamped into each case, while subsequent waves contained certificates of authenticity marking their numbers. The first three waves were bound in a cardboard sleeve displaying the reproduced signatures of Maltin and Roy E. Disney. In 2003, a Costco-exclusive boxed set called The Ultimate Disney Treasure Chest presented the first two waves of the series without the tin canisters; later, in 2009, the D23 released the Walt Disney Treasures Premium Collection, a limited-edition near-complete collection of all the releases in the series, with the exceptions of the Elfego Baca and The Swamp Fox: Legendary Heroes set and the two Wave Nine releases.

Dick Cook used his position of power and influence within The Walt Disney Company to help Maltin negotiate with the Disney lawyers about releasing much of this vintage material, including controversial shorts like Der Fuehrer's Face and Mickey's Mellerdrammer. According to Maltin, the executives had initially rejected his idea to release the Zorro television series, since their previous attempts at releasing Season-by-Season sets of their television shows were financially unsuccessful. However after Maltin phoned Cook about the situation, Cook ordered the executives to restore and release the entire series.

In 2009, the Walt Disney Treasures series came to an end when Dick Cook left the Disney company, and the new management of Walt Disney Home Entertainment was uninterested in continuing the series. As Maltin recalled: "Of all the projects I've worked on, the Walt Disney Treasures has cut the widest swath. People love those DVDs, and over a decade since their demise people continue to ask me if they will ever be released on Blu-ray. The apparent answer is 'no', because there is no-one to champion them within the Disney company... If I had my druthers I would've continued producing and hosting Walt Disney Treasures but as it stands I'm proud of what we accomplished over nine years."

Walt Disney Treasures DVDs are still out of print, and copies in good condition are often resold on sites like eBay and Amazon for extremely high prices.

== Release history ==
Walt Disney Treasures: Wave One — December 4, 2001

- Mickey Mouse in Living Color
- Silly Symphonies
- Disneyland, USA
- Davy Crockett

Walt Disney Treasures: Wave Two — December 3, 2002

- Mickey Mouse in Black and White
- The Complete Goofy
- Behind the Scenes at the Walt Disney Studio

Walt Disney Treasures: Wave Three — May 18, 2004

- Mickey Mouse in Living Color, Volume Two
- The Chronological Donald, Volume One
- Walt Disney on the Front Lines
- Tomorrow Land

Walt Disney Treasures: Wave Four — December 7, 2004

- Mickey Mouse in Black and White, Volume Two
- The Complete Pluto, Volume One
- The Mickey Mouse Club

Walt Disney Treasures: Wave Five — December 6, 2005

- The Chronological Donald, Volume Two
- Disney Rarities: Celebrated Shorts: 1920s–1960s
- The Adventures of Spin & Marty (The Mickey Mouse Club)
- Elfego Baca and The Swamp Fox: Legendary Heroes

Walt Disney Treasures: Wave Six — December 19, 2006

- More Silly Symphonies
- The Complete Pluto, Volume Two
- The Hardy Boys: The Mystery of the Applegate Treasure
- Your Host, Walt Disney

Walt Disney Treasures: Wave Seven — December 11, 2007

- The Chronological Donald, Volume Three
- The Adventures of Oswald the Lucky Rabbit
- Disneyland: Secrets, Stories and Magic

Walt Disney Treasures: Wave Eight — November 11, 2008

- The Chronological Donald, Volume Four
- Dr. Syn: The Scarecrow of Romney Marsh
- Mickey Mouse Club Presents: Annette

Walt Disney Treasures: Wave Nine — November 3, 2009

- Zorro: The Complete First Season
- Zorro: The Complete Second Season

== Comic album line ==
In 2006, Gemstone Publishing published the first of two Walt Disney Treasures comic albums: Disney Comics: 75 Years of Innovation, reprinting approximately 160 pages of vintage international comics in chronological order. Much like the DVD releases, the comic album featured some politically incorrect stories in unedited form, accompanied by an article to put them in historical context. The comic album also featured a cover designed to look much like the DVD series' cases.

In 2008, Gemstone published the second Treasures comic album: Uncle Scrooge: A Little Something Special, featuring various Scrooge comics from over the years.

Two more Treasures comic albums were announced for 2009, with the titles: Mickey Mouse: In Death Valley and Donald Duck: 75 Unlucky Years. Due to the cessation of Gemstone's Disney comics license, these albums never came out in the Treasures series.
