= Virginia Mauret =

American dancer & musician

- Mauret in 1922
- Died: January 16, 1983; New York City
- Occupations: Musician, dancer

Virginia Mauret (died January 16, 1983), sometimes seen as Virginie Mauret, was an American musician and dancer. In 1962 she became the founder and director of the Young Artists Opera of New York City.

== Early life ==
Although she was sometimes addressed as "Mademoiselle", Mauret was not French. Mauret studied dance with Michel Fokine. She also learned to play violin and piano, and studied voice and music theory.

== Career ==
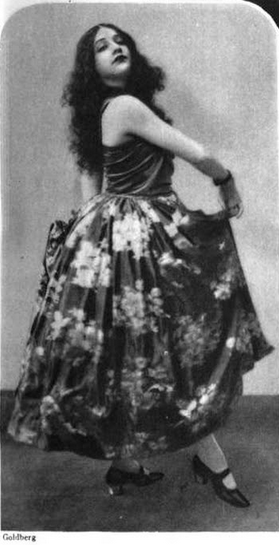
Virginia Mauret, from a 1921 publication.

Mauret interpreted music in dance, sometimes with a musical trio accompanying her, sometimes with a symphony orchestra, as when she performed at Carnegie Hall in 1920 and 1922. Mauret's vaudeville act involved singing, dancing, and playing violin, sometimes simultaneously. She also designed her own costumes. One of Mauret's performances involved dancing to compositions by Bach.

Mauret choreographed dances for a Broadway and touring revival of Babes in Toyland in 1930. In 1933 she was singing for radio programs, and was involved with the Montreal Opera.

From the beginning of her career, Mauret gave performances at public schools and for children. In 1962, following her long interest in arts education, Mauret founded the Young Artists Opera program in New York City. In 1975 she helped to translate Lortzing's Die Opernprobe into English for possible use by the Young Artists Opera.

== Personal life ==
Virginia Mauret died in 1983 in New York City.
