= Beulah Ashley =

American film editor

- Born: Beulah Maria Rodgers; January 24, 1899; Meridian, Mississippi, USA
- Died: July 6, 1965 (aged 66); Hollywood, Los Angeles, California, USA
- Occupations: Film actress and writer
- Spouse(s): Alsie Ashley (m. circa 1918, died ?); Morris Feldstein (m. 1931; ?)
- Children: Joel Ashley

Beulah Maria Ashley (née Rodgers; January 24, 1899 – July 6, 1965) was an American character actress in silent film, and script supervisor active during Hollywood's Golden Age. She was the mother of actor Joel Ashley.

== Early life and career ==
Born on January 24, 1899, in Meridian, Mississippi, and raised there and in Macon, Georgia, Ashley was one of at least six daughters born to Laura Mariah (née Jones) and Joel Thomas Rodgers, a repairman employed by Central of Georgia Railway.

In either 1934 or 1935 (following the marriage of actress Barbara Rogers—Ashley's sister, née Emma Lee Rodgers—to Warner Brothers executive William Koenig), Beulah moved to Los Angeles with her son Joel. Her Hollywood debut, at least as a writer, came shortly thereafter, in the form of an uncredited rewrite on Warner Brothers' G-Men. In April 1935, virtually coinciding with that film's release, Ashley—along with her sister—helped her son make his unofficial West Coast debut at Hollywood Military Academy, in Aunt Julia's Pearls, (Note: A somewhat more notable Joel Ashley "first" would take place in December of that year—albeit unbeknownst to viewers—in the form of his own uncredited Hollywood debut as the stunt double for a still relatively unknown Errol Flynn, in the latter's breakout role, Captain Blood. Moreover, it was not, as later maintained by Kay Francis biographer Lynn Kear, merely his "hanging out on studio lots" that brought about that debut (said "hanging" having evidently entailed a good deal of paid employment), but rather, as noted nine years after the fact by that film's director, the subsequent "sliding down". His first chance came when he was working with Warner Bros. as a studio electrician. One day he slid down a rope, from the top of the stage practically into the lap of Michael Curtiz, the director. Instead of bawling him out, Curtiz promptly signed Ashley for a part in the picture he was making. It seems that he had been searching for actors who could slide down the rigging of a ship and Ashley, all unconsciously, had given an exhibition of what he could do in that line. In short, he slid right into the movies.) a three-act comedy by Boston-based educator/playwright Hope Hearn Moulton.

In the July 27, 1944 issue of The Hollywood Reporter, Ashley was one of a near pageful of alphabetically listed cast and crew members thanked for their work in MGM's Bathing Beauty (1944), including—among others in Ashley's immediate vicinity—bandleader Irving Aaronson, choreographer Robert Alton, assistant director E. J. Babille, and film editor Margaret Booth.

== Personal life and death ==
Ashley married at least twice: in the late 19-teens to Alsie Ashley, with whom she had her only child, actor Joel Ashley, and in 1931, to the Russian-born Morris Feldstein.

In December 1935, Ashley was one of a plethora of Hollywood professionals testifying on behalf of their colleague, director/choreographer Busby Berkeley, then on trial for second degree murder, with Ashley, her brother-in-law William Koenig, and several others testifying as to Berkeley's sobriety in the period immediately preceding the fatal mishap.

Asley died in Los Angeles on July 6, 1965, aged 66, following a lengthy illness. She was survived by her son and four sisters.

== Selected filmography ==
- G Men (1935)
- Bathing Beauty (1944) (uncredited)
