= The Broken Star =

1956 film by Lesley Selander

- Theatrical release poster
- Directed by: Lesley Selander
- Written by: John C. Higgins
- Produced by: Howard W. Koch
- Starring: Howard Duff; Lita Baron; Bill Williams; Douglas Fowley; Henry Calvin; Addison Richards; Joel Ashley; John Pickard
- Cinematography: William Margulies
- Edited by: John F. Schreyer
- Music by: Paul Dunlap
- Production company: Bel-Air Productions
- Distributed by: United Artists
- Release date: April 1956
- Running time: 82 minutes
- Country: United States
- Language: English

The Broken Star is a 1956 American Western film directed by Lesley Selander and written by John C. Higgins. The film stars Howard Duff, Lita Baron, Bill Williams, Douglas Fowley, Henry Calvin, Addison Richards, Joel Ashley and John Pickard. The film was released in April 1956, by United Artists.

== Plot ==
Frank Smeed, a deputy marshall, kills a ranch hand and steals a sack of gold. He claims it was a fair fight but Wayne Forrester, the marshal of Arizona's Southern Territory, has his doubts. Unknown to Smeed, there was a witness to the murder. While the investigation unfolds, Smeed tries to cover up the evidence and eliminate people who can implicate him.

Another deputy Bill Gentry, who has always admired Smeed, defends him to his girlfriend, Conchita Alvarado, but is astonished when Alvarado translates the written eyewitness account (from the Spanish) by Nachez. Smeed kidnaps Nachez, taking him to a mine, where he kills him and hides the body. Gentry shows up at the mine but is over-powered by Smeed, tied up, and left to be buried in a cave-in caused by Smeed setting a charge.

The marshal arrives with his posse and hunts down Smeed inside the mine, using an alternate entry. In the meantime, Gentry, who survives the cave-in, unties himself and joins the hunt. The posse corners Smeed, who draws first, and is killed by Gentry. In the closing scene, Gentry (with his new bride, Alvarado), is presented with a new badge by Forrester and congratulated for being appointed to the position of marshal of Arizona's Northern Territory.

== Cast ==
- Howard Duff as Deputy Marshal Frank Smeed
- Lita Baron as Conchita Alvarado
- Bill Williams as Deputy Marshal Bill Gentry
- Douglas Fowley as Hiram Charleton
- Henry Calvin as Thornton Wills
- Addison Richards as Marshal Wayne Forrester
- Joel Ashley as Messendyke
- John Pickard as Van Horn
- William 'Bill' Phillips as Doc Mott
- Joe Dominguez as Nachez
