= Lowell S. Hawley =

American screenwriter

Lowell S. Hawley (20 September 1908 - 6 May 2003) was an American writer.

== Biography ==
Hawley was born in Lynden, Washington. He began his career writing for a radio station in Bellingham, Washington.

He moved to Los Angeles in 1942 and spent a decade writing for radio KFI and its program "Art Baker's Notebook." His first novel, "A Few Buttons Missing: The Case Book of a Psychiatrist" (1951) was a best seller. He followed it with "Counsel for the Damned" (1953) written with Ralph Bushnell Potts.

He was a writer for the Walt Disney Studio from 1957 to 1969. He then retired.

== Credits ==
=== Books ===
- A Few Buttons Missing (1951)

=== TV Series ===
- The Loretta Young Show (1955–56) (TV series)
- My Friend Flicka (1956) (TV series)
- The Adventures of Jim Bowie (1957) (TV series)
- The Millionaire (1957) (TV series)
- Zorro (1958–59) (TV series) - also story editor
- The Sign of Zorro (1958)
- The Californians (1959) (TV series)
- Zorro, the Avenger (1959)

=== Features ===
- Swiss Family Robinson (1960)
- Babes in Toyland (1961)
- In Search of the Castaways (1962)
- Mooncussers (1962)
- A Tiger Walks (1964)
- The Adventures of Bullwhip Griffin (1967)
- The Young Loner (1968)
- The One and Only, Genuine, Original Family Band (1968)
