= Eeper Weeper =

Nursery rhyme

"Eeper Weeper" or "Heeper Peeper" is an English nursery rhyme and skipping song that tells the story of a chimney sweep who puts his second wife in a chimney. The rhyme has a Roud Folk Song Index number of 13497.

== Lyrics ==
Eeper Weeper, chimney sweeper,
Had a wife but couldn't keep her.
Had another, didn't love her,
Up the chimney he did shove her.

== Origins ==
Iona and Peter Opie noted that the rhyme had been used in this form from at least the first decade of the 20th century. A verse collected from Aberdeen, Scotland and published in 1868 had the words:

Peter, my neeper,
Had a wife,
And he couidna' keep her,
He pat her i' the wa',
And lat a' the mice eat her.

This may be an older version of "Eeper Neeper" and of "Peter Peter Pumpkin Eater".
