= Walt Disney Treasures: Wave Nine =

Disney DVD series

The ninth and final wave of the Walt Disney Treasures series of DVDs was released on November 3, 2009. This wave comprises two releases, each containing one season of the 1957–1959 Zorro TV series. Note that these episodes were previously released exclusively through the Disney Movie Club, but those releases were colorized whereas these releases are the original black-and-white format. Each release also includes two of the four hour-long Zorro episodes originally aired on Walt Disney Presents in 1960 and 1961. This wave is the first wave to not include any animated sets, and the last wave that has been released to date. Despite being the last wave, this was the only wave to feature standard size DVD cases, while the tin size remained the same. For the first time also, the tins were colored black, and was the second time featuring another colored tin since Oswald the Lucky Rabbit. This wave also brought back the side straps, now colored yellow instead of blue.

30,000 sets were produced.

== Zorro: The Complete First Season ==

This set includes all 39 episodes from the show's first season.

=== Bonus features ===
- The Walt Disney Presents episodes "El Bandido" and "Adios El Cuchillo" (1960)
- "The Life and Legend of Zorro"
- Excerpt from the Walt Disney Presents episode "The Fourth Anniversary Show"

== Zorro: The Complete Second Season ==

This set includes all 39 episodes from the show's second season.

=== Bonus features ===
- The Walt Disney Presents episodes "The Postponed Wedding" and "Auld Acquaintance" (1961)
- "Behind the Mask"
- A Trip to the Archives
