= Crime Against Joe =

1956 film by Lee Sholem

- Theatrical release poster
- Directed by: Lee Sholem
- Screenplay by: Robert C. Dennis
- Story by: Decla Dunning
- Produced by: Howard W. Koch
- Starring: John Bromfield; Julie London; Henry Calvin; Patricia Blair; Joel Ashley; Robert Keys
- Cinematography: William Margulies
- Edited by: Michael Pozen
- Music by: Paul Dunlap
- Production company: Bel-Air Productions
- Distributed by: United Artists
- Release dates: March 21, 1956 (United States); May 9, 1956 (Los Angeles)
- Running time: 70 minutes
- Country: United States
- Language: English

Crime Against Joe is a 1956 American film noir crime film directed by Lee Sholem and written by Robert C. Dennis. The film stars John Bromfield, Julie London, Henry Calvin, Patricia Blair, Joel Ashley and Robert Keys.

== Plot ==
A Korean War veteran is accused of the murder of a night club singer in Tucson, Arizona. A high school pin was found on the scene of the crime and the veteran's pin is missing. However, when the crime was committed, the veteran was leading a female somnambulist to her home but her over-protective father gives a false testimony to the district attorney. "Slacks", a female friend, gives him a false alibi but the police soon sort that out. The veteran thinks that one of his fellow high school students from 1945 was the murderer. He has got possible suspects on a list. Is the murderer among them?

== Cast ==
- John Bromfield as Joe Manning
- Julie London as Frances 'Slacks' Bennett
- Henry Calvin as Red Waller
- Patricia Blair as Christine 'Christy' Rowen
- Joel Ashley as Philip Rowen
- Robert Keys as Detective Sgt. Hollander
- Alika Louis as Irene Crescent
- John Pickard as Harry Dorn
- Frances Morris as Nora Manning
- Rhodes Reason as George Niles
- Mauritz Hugo as Dr. Louis Tatreau
- Joyce Jameson as Gloria Wayne
- Morgan Jones as Luther Woods
- James Parnell as Ralph Corey
- Addison Richards as District Attorney Roy Kasden
