= Mel Leven =

American composer and lyricist

- Born: Melville A. Leven; November 11, 1914; Chicago, Illinois, United States
- Died: December 17, 2007 (aged 93); Studio City, California, United States
- Occupations: Composer and lyricist

Melville A. Leven (November 11, 1914 – December 17, 2007) was an American composer and lyricist who had a long association with the Walt Disney Company, although he also wrote songs for Peggy Lee ("Every Time"), The Andrews Sisters ("Commoners Boogy"), Nat King Cole, Dean Martin, and Les Brown, among others.

== Biography ==
Mel Leven was born in Chicago. His most famous song is arguably "Cruella de Vil" from the 1961 Disney animated feature One Hundred and One Dalmatians, which is claimed to have been written in homage to Thelonious Monk's "Ba-Lue Bolivar Ba-Lues-Are". That same year, he also wrote the story and new lyrics to sixteen tunes for the film Babes in Toyland. In later years, he wrote songs, stories, and did voice-over work for the PBS children's series Big Blue Marble, as well as working on a number of projects for television commercials. He also composed "When The Buzzards Return To Hinckley Ridge" for the 1969 Disney animated short, "It's Tough to Be a Bird", which went on to win the Academy Award for Best Short Subject in 1970. The song was sung by comedian Ruth Buzzi.

Leven also appeared in Snap, Crackle, Pop commercials. He also wrote the Little Ranger Nature series for Disney in the 1960s.

His work has been honored with two Emmy Awards and two Peabody Awards.

A conservationist and talented fly fisherman, in retirement Leven traveled the world in pursuit of fish and became a beloved fixture along Northern California rivers in particular. He features prominently in the 2009 documentary Rivers of a Lost Coast, on the decline of the California steelhead population.

According to his son, Leven died on December 17, 2007. He was 93. Mel Leven was divorced and had two children, Bill Leven and a daughter Laurie Fondiler Leven. His first wife was Vera and his second wife (the mother of Bill and Laurie) was Jeanie Francis.
