= The Gay Cavalier =

The Gay Cavalier may refer to:

- The Gay Cavalier (TV series), a 1957 British television adventure series
- The Gay Cavalier (film), a 1946 black and white Western adventure film
