= Bill Francoeur =

American dramatist

- Born: William Francis Francoeur; November 18, 1948; Manchester, New Hampshire, U.S.
- Died: February 2, 2015 (aged 66); Lone Tree, Colorado, U.S.
- Occupation: Musician
- Spouse: 1
- Children: 4

Bill Francoeur (November 18, 1948 – February 2, 2015) was a musical theatre composer and actor who had more than 75 musicals published for the amateur theatre market in a career spanning over 25 years.

== Career ==
Francoeur was a junior and senior high school teacher for ten years before becoming a playwright. Francoeur and longtime collaborator, Scott DeTurk, wrote the music and lyrics for the 2005 musical "The Ghost and Mrs. Muir", with a book by James Mellon. Francoeur and DeTurk also wrote the music and lyrics for "Western Star". with a book by Dale Wasserman. Francoeur received California's Elly Award for Best Original Work for the musical in 1993. In 2002, his children's musical "Oz!" was produced Off-Broadway.

Francoeur began collaborating with playwright Tim Kelly in the mid-1980s. The two created "Oz!" and numerous other works together.

Bill Francoeur died February 2, 2015, in Colorado. He was survived by his wife and three children.

== Musicals ==
- Babes in Toyland (with Tim Kelly)
- Bah, Humbug!
- The Big Bad Musical
- Blue Suede Paws (with Kelly)
- Cactus Pass Jamboree
- Captain Bree and Her Lady Pirates (also called The Lady Pirates of Captain Bree)
- Charleston! (with Kelly)
- Cinderella's Glass Slipper
- Coney Island of Dr. Moreau (with Kelly)
- Disco Knights
- Don't Say No to the U.S.O.! (with Kelly)
- Doo-Wop Wed Widing Hood
- Drabble (1985)
- Enchanted Sleeping Beauty
- The Enchantment of Beauty and the Beast
- Everything's Groovy! (with Kelly)
- Fee, Fi, Fo, Fum!
- Flapper! (with Kelly)
- Flower Power!
- Friday Knight Fever
- Fussin' an' a-Feudin'
- Going... Going... Gone With the Breeze
- Gone With the Breeze (with Kelly)
- The Great Ghost Chase
- Groovy!
- Guess What I Did Last Summer
- Hankerin' Hillbillies
- The Headless Horseman
- Hee Haw Hayride (1993) (with Kelly)
- The Internal Teen Machine
- Is There a Doctor in the House? (with Kelly)
- Jack and the Giant
- Jitterbug Juliet
- Kilroy Was Here (1995)
- Kokonut Island (with Kelly)
- Kokonut Kapers
- Krazy Kamp — The Musical
- Lady Pirates of the Caribbean
- Little Luncheonette of Terror (1988) (with Kelly)
- A Little Princess — The Musical (1996)
- Lucky, Lucky Hudson and the 12th Street Gang (with Kelly)
- Magnolia
- Murder at Crooked House
- The Nifty Fifties (with Kelly)
- No Strings Attached
- Nutcracker
- Oh, Horrors! It's Murder!
- Oz! (1995) (with Kelly)
- Pecos Bill, Slue-Foot Sue and the Wing-Dang-Doo!
- Pied Piper - The Musical
- A Pirate's Life For Me
- Rock Around the Block
- Romeo and Harriet
- Royal Bachelor
- The Secret Garden (1996) (with Kelly)
- Shake With a Zombie (with Kelly)
- Shakespeare Comes to Calamity Creek (1997)
- Sleepy Hollow
- Snow White and the Seven Dwarfs (with Kelly)
- The Stories of Scheherazade
- The Story of Hansel and Gretel
- The Story of Velveteen Rabbit
- Sunset Trail
- Surf's Up!
- Tale of Beauty and the Beast
- There's a Monster in My Closet!
- Through the Looking Glass
- Time and Time Again (1987) (with Kelly)
- Tiny Thumbelina
- Twinderella - The Musical
- Unhappily Ever After
- Wagon Wheels West
- Way Out West in a Dress
- We the People — the Musical
- Westward, Whoa!
- When in Rome...
- The Wild, Wild, Wildest West
- Wipeout!
- The Wishing Tree (1988)
- Wonderland!
- Wrangler Ranch
- The Yankee Doodle Song and Dance Man
- You Ain't Nothin' But A Werewolf (with Kelly)
