= Henry Calvin =

American actor (1918–1975)

- Born: Wimberly Calvin Goodman; May 25, 1918; Dallas, Texas, U.S.
- Died: October 6, 1975 (aged 57); Dallas, Texas, U.S.
- Resting place: Grove Hill Memorial Park in Dallas, Texas
- Occupation: comic actor
- Years active: 1949–1971
- Known for: Sergeant Garcia on Disney's Zorro
- Spouse: Edna Frances Goodman (1947–1962)

Henry Calvin (born Wimberly Calvin Goodman; May 25, 1918 – October 6, 1975) was an American actor known for his role as the Spanish soldier Sergeant García on Walt Disney's live-action television series Zorro (1957–1959).

== Early life ==
Born in Dallas, Texas, he sang in his local Baptist church choir as a child; he was often the featured soloist. Calvin attended Winnetka Grade School during his childhood. After graduating from Sunset High School in Dallas, Texas, he attended Southern Methodist University before pursuing a career as an actor and singer.

== Career ==
Calvin hosted an NBC radio show in 1950 and appeared on Broadway (most notably in Kismet as the Wazir of Police). In 1952 he portrayed Big Ben on the children's TV series Howdy Doody, and made his film debut in Crime Against Joe as Red Waller four years later.

His character in Zorro, Sergeant Demetrio López García, was a comedic foil for Zorro and his secret identity, Don Diego de la Vega (Guy Williams). Sometimes a friend (especially to Diego), and sometimes a reluctant foe, other characters constantly outwit García, and he is often his own worst enemy due to his weakness for food and wine.

Calvin also sang and released a version of the "Zorro" theme song. Calvin's rich baritone voice also contributed to several musical interludes throughout the series, singing everything from drinking songs to a serenade, and even a duet with Annette Funicello in one episode. After the series ended due to a contract dispute with ABC, he reprised the role of Garcia in all four Zorro stories that aired as part of Walt Disney Presents in 1960 and 1961.

He appeared in Disney's 1960 film Toby Tyler as gruff circus wagon driver Ben Cotter, Toby's friend and protector. Toby's other mentor in the film, clown and animal trainer Sam Treat, was played by Gene Sheldon, who co-starred in Zorro as Bernardo. Kevin Corcoran, a prolific child actor at the studio in that era, played Toby Tyler. All three actors also appeared in another Disney film, Babes in Toyland (1961).

Calvin sang the children's song "Never Smile at a Crocodile" for Disneyland Records, a recording that was later reissued as part of a Peter Pan soundtrack CD. He sang "We Won't Be Happy Till We Get It" with Ray Bolger and "Slowly He Sank to the Bottom of the Sea" on the Babes in Toyland soundtrack.

After Zorro and his Disney contract ended, Calvin guest-starred in numerous television series during the 1960s. In his appearance on a 1963 episode of The Dick Van Dyke Show, his character performed a comedy sketch as Oliver Hardy, opposite Dick Van Dyke's Rob Petrie character as Stan Laurel.

He also kept in touch with other members of the Zorro cast, even traveling to Argentina with Guy Williams in 1973 to attend a charity event. He died in Dallas from throat cancer in 1975.

== Selected credits ==
- Crime Against Joe (1956) as Red Waller
- The Broken Star (1956) as Thornton W. Wills
- The Yeomen of the Guard (Hallmark Hall of Fame) (1957) (TV) as Wilfred Shadbolt
- Zorro (1957–1959) as Sergeant Garcia
- Toby Tyler, or Ten Weeks with a Circus (1960) as Ben Cotter
- Walt Disney Presents (in four Zorro episodes, 1960–1961) as Sergeant Garcia
- Babes in Toyland (1961) as Gonzorgo
- The Dick Van Dyke Show (in "The Sam Pomerantz Scandals", 1963) as Sam Pomerantz
- Petticoat Junction (in "The Ringer", 1963) as Pixley Fats
- Ship of Fools (1965) as Gregorio (Fat Man)
- The Girl from U.N.C.L.E. (in "The Prisoner of Zalamar Affair", 1966) as Sheikh Ali Hassen
- Run, Buddy, Run (in "Grand Mexican Hotel", 1966) as Jose
- The Man from U.N.C.L.E. (in "The Monks of St. Thomas Affair", 1966) as Brother Peter
- Mannix (in "The Cost of a Vacation", 1967) as Lazaro Figueroa
