= List of Zorro (1957 TV series) episodes =

This is a list of episodes for the Zorro television series that ran from 1957 to 1961. Seasons 1 and 2 are composed of half-hour episodes. Four one-hour specials followed.

== Series overview ==
Season	Episodes	Originally released	
Season	Episodes	First released	Last released
1	39	October 10, 1957	July 3, 1958
2	39	October 9, 1958	July 2, 1959
Specials	4	October 30, 1960	April 2, 1961

== Episodes ==
=== Season 1 (1957–58) ===
No. overall	No. in season	Title	Directed by	Written by	Original release date
1	1	"Presenting Señor Zorro"	Norman Foster	Norman Foster & Bob Wehling	October 10, 1957
2	2	"Zorro's Secret Passage"	Norman Foster	Anthony Ellis	October 17, 1957
3	3	"Zorro Rides to the Mission"	Norman Foster	Malcolm Stuart Boylan & Jackson Gillis	October 24, 1957
4	4	"The Ghost of the Mission"	Norman Foster	Norman Foster	October 31, 1957
5	5	"Zorro's Romance"	Lewis R. Foster	John Meredyth Lucas	November 7, 1957
6	6	"Zorro Saves a Friend"	Lewis R. Foster	John Meredyth Lucas	November 14, 1957
7	7	"Monastario Sets a Trap"	Lewis R. Foster	Story by : Joel Kane; Teleplay by : Lowell S. Hawley	November 21, 1957
8	8	"Zorro's Ride into Terror"	Lewis R. Foster	John Meredyth Lucas	November 28, 1957
9	9	"A Fair Trial"	Norman Foster	Jackson Gillis & Bob Wehling	December 5, 1957
10	10	"Garcia's Secret Mission"	Norman Foster	Anthony Ellis	December 12, 1957
11	11	"Double Trouble for Zorro"	Norman Foster	Norman Foster	December 19, 1957
12	12	"Zorro, Luckiest Swordsman Alive"	Norman Foster	Lowell S. Hawley	December 26, 1957
13	13	"The Fall of Monastario"	Norman Foster	John Meredyth Lucas	January 2, 1958
14	14	"Shadow of Doubt"	Robert Stevenson	Lowell S. Hawley	January 9, 1958
15	15	"Garcia Stands Accused"	Robert Stevenson	Lowell S. Hawley	January 16, 1958
16	16	"Slaves of the Eagle"	Robert Stevenson	Lowell S. Hawley	January 23, 1958
17	17	"Sweet Face of Danger"	John Meredyth Lucas	John Meredyth Lucas	January 30, 1958
18	18	"Zorro Fights His Father"	John Meredyth Lucas	John Meredyth Lucas	February 6, 1958
19	19	"Death Stacks the Deck"	John Meredyth Lucas	John Meredyth Lucas	February 13, 1958
20	20	"Agent Of The Eagle"	Charles Barton	N.B. Stone Jr.	February 20, 1958
21	21	"Zorro Springs a Trap"	Charles Barton	Lewis R. Foster	February 27, 1958
22	22	"The Unmasking of Zorro"	Charles Barton	N.B. Stone Jr.	March 6, 1958
23	23	"The Secret of the Sierra"	Norman Foster	Norman Foster	March 13, 1958
24	24	"The New Commandante"	Norman Foster	Norman Foster	March 20, 1958
25	25	"The Fox and the Coyote"	Norman Foster	Norman Foster	March 27, 1958
26	26	"Adios, Señor Magistrado"	Norman Foster	Bob Wehling	April 3, 1958
27	27	"The Eagle's Brood"	Charles Barton and Norman Foster	Lowell S. Hawley	April 10, 1958
28	28	"Zorro by Proxy"	Charles Barton	Lowell S. Hawley	April 17, 1958
29	29	"Quintana Makes a Choice"	Charles Barton	Lowell S. Hawley	April 24, 1958
30	30	"Zorro Lights a Fuse"	Charles Barton	Lowell S. Hawley	May 1, 1958
31	31	"The Man with the Whip"	Charles Lamont	N.B. Stone Jr.	May 8, 1958
32	32	"The Cross of the Andes"	Charles Lamont	N.B. Stone Jr.	May 15, 1958
33	33	"The Deadly Bolas"	Charles Lamont	N.B. Stone Jr.	May 22, 1958
34	34	"The Well of Death"	Charles Lamont	N.B. Stone Jr.	May 29, 1958
35	35	"The Tightening Noose"	Charles Barton	Lowell S. Hawley & Bob Wehling	June 5, 1958
36	36	"The Sergeant Regrets"	Charles Barton	Lowell S. Hawley & Bob Wehling	June 12, 1958
37	37	"The Eagle Leaves the Nest"	Charles Barton	Lowell S. Hawley & Bob Wehling	June 19, 1958
38	38	"Bernardo Faces Death"	Charles Barton	Lowell S. Hawley & Bob Wehling	June 26, 1958
39	39	"The Eagle's Flight"	Charles Barton	Lowell S. Hawley & Bob Wehling	July 3, 1958

=== Season 2 (1958–59) ===
No. overall	No. in season	Title	Directed by	Written by	Original release date
40	1	"Welcome to Monterey"	William Witney	Lowell S. Hawley	October 9, 1958
41	2	"Zorro Rides Alone"	William Witney	Gene L. Coon	October 16, 1958
42	3	"Horse of Another Color"	William Witney	Robert Bloomfield	October 23, 1958
43	4	"The Señorita Makes a Choice"	William Witney	Robert Bloomfield	October 30, 1958
44	5	"Rendezvous at Sundown"	William Witney	Gene L. Coon	November 6, 1958
45	6	"The New Order"	Charles Barton	Bob Wehling	November 13, 1958
46	7	"An Eye for an Eye"	Charles Barton	Bob Wehling	November 20, 1958
47	8	"Zorro and the Flag of Truce"	Charles Barton	Bob Wehling	November 27, 1958
48	9	"Ambush"	Charles Barton	Lowell S. Hawley	December 4, 1958
49	10	"The Practical Joker"	Charles Lamont	Bob Wehling	December 11, 1958
50	11	"The Flaming Arrow"	Charles Lamont	Robert Bloomfield	December 18, 1958
51	12	"Zorro Fights a Duel"	Charles Lamont	Bob Wehling	December 25, 1958
52	13	"Amnesty for Zorro"	Charles Lamont	Bob Wehling	January 1, 1959
53	14	"The Runaways"	William Witney	Robert Bloomfield	January 8, 1959
54	15	"The Iron Box"	William Witney	Bob Wehling	January 15, 1959
55	16	"The Gay Caballero"	Hollingsworth Morse	Lowell S. Hawley	January 22, 1959
56	17	"Tornado Is Missing"	Hollingsworth Morse	Bob Wehling	January 29, 1959
57	18	"Zorro Versus Cupid"	Hollingsworth Morse	Bob Wehling	February 5, 1959
58	19	"The Legend of Zorro"	Hollingsworth Morse	Lowell S. Hawley	February 12, 1959
59	20	"Spark of Revenge"	William Witney	Lowell S. Hawley	February 19, 1959
60	21	"The Missing Father"	Hollingsworth Morse	Bob Wehling	February 26, 1959
61	22	"Please Believe Me"	Hollingsworth Morse	Lowell S. Hawley	March 5, 1959
62	23	"The Brooch"	Hollingsworth Morse	Bob Wehling	March 12, 1959
63	24	"Zorro and the Mountain Man"	Charles Barton	N.B. Stone Jr.	March 19, 1959
64	25	"The Hound of the Sierras"	Hollingsworth Morse	N.B. Stone Jr.	March 26, 1959
65	26	"Manhunt"	Hollingsworth Morse	N.B. Stone Jr.	April 2, 1959
66	27	"The Man from Spain"	Hollingsworth Morse	Leslie Edgley	April 9, 1959
67	28	"Treasure for the King"	Hollingsworth Morse	Maurice Hill	April 16, 1959
68	29	"Exposing the Tyrant"	Hollingsworth Morse	Maurice Hill & Bob Wehling	April 23, 1959
69	30	"Zorro Takes a Dare"	Hollingsworth Morse	Leslie Edgley	April 30, 1959
70	31	"An Affair of Honor"	Hollingsworth Morse	Lewis R. Foster	May 7, 1959
71	32	"The Sergeant Sees Red"	Harmon Jones	Robert J. Shaw & Bob Wehling	May 14, 1959
72	33	"Invitation to Death"	Hollingsworth Morse	Lowell S. Hawley	May 21, 1959
73	34	"The Captain Regrets"	Hollingsworth Morse	Lowell S. Hawley	May 28, 1959
74	35	"Masquerade for Murder"	Hollingsworth Morse	Bob Wehling	June 4, 1959
75	36	"Long Live the Governor"	Hollingsworth Morse	Bob Wehling	June 11, 1959
76	37	"The Fortune Teller"	Harmon Jones	Leslie Edgley	June 18, 1959
77	38	"Señor China Boy"	Charles Lamont	David Lang	June 25, 1959
78	39	"Finders Keepers"	Hollingsworth Morse	Lowell S. Hawley & Bob Wehling	July 2, 1959

=== Specials (1960–61) ===
No. overall	No. in season	Title	Directed by	Written by	Original release date
79	1	"El Bandido"	William Witney	Bob Wehling	October 30, 1960
80	2	"Adios, El Cuchillo"	William Witney	Bob Wehling	November 6, 1960
81	3	"The Postponed Wedding"	James Neilson	Roy Edward Disney & Bob Wehling	January 1, 1961
82	4	"Auld Acquaintance"	James Neilson	Bob Wehling	April 2, 1961

== Home releases ==
In 1997, Walt Disney Home Video released the theatrical film The Sign of Zorro, in which portions of the first 13 TV episodes were edited into a feature film, on VHS.

Walt Disney Home Video also released six volumes of episodes from the second season on VHS, each volume comprising a complete story arc:

- Vol. 1: The Secret of El Zorro (Episodes 49-52, guest-starring Richard Anderson) (ISBN 1-55890-341-0)
- Vol. 2: Zorro and the Mountain Man (Episodes 63-65, guest-starring Jonathan Harris) (ISBN 1-55890-339-9)
- Vol. 3: Zorro and the Mystery of Don Cabrillo (Episodes 60-62, guest-starring Annette Funicello) (ISBN 1-55890-340-2)
- Vol. 4: Invitation to Death (Episodes 72-75) (ISBN 1-55890-362-3)
- Vol. 5: The Gay Caballero (Episodes 55-58, guest-starring Cesar Romero) (ISBN 1-55890-173-6)
- Vol. 6: The Man from Spain (Episodes 66-69, guest-starring Everett Sloane) (ISBN 1-55890-175-2)

On November 3, 2009, Disney released the first two seasons on DVD, each in a limited-edition collector's tin in the original black-and-white format.

Buena Vista Home Entertainment also released both seasons in colorized versions (Season One in 2006 in five separate volumes and Season Two in 2009 in a boxed set).

On October 5, 2022, the first two seasons became available to stream on Disney+.

== Sources ==
- Zorro (1957) at epguides.com
- Zorro (1957) at IMDb
