= Gene Sheldon =

American actor (1908–1982)

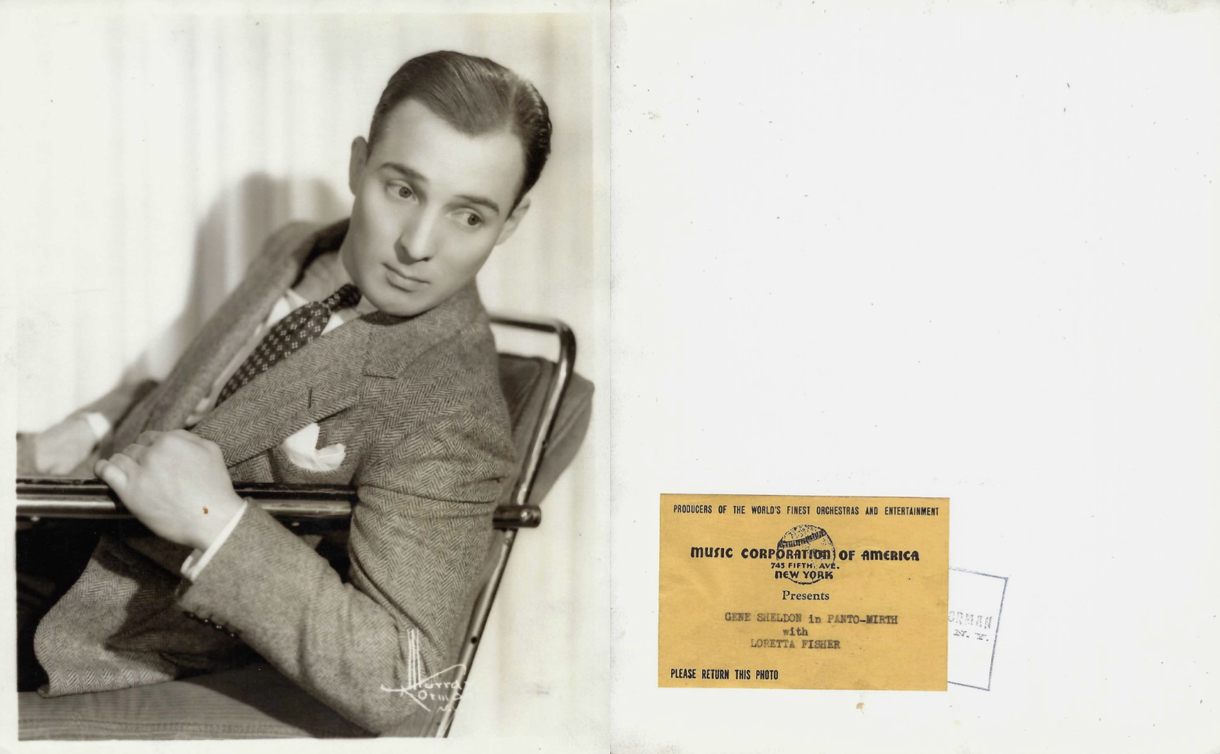
- Sheldon c.1930
- Born: Eugene Hume; February 1, 1908; Columbus, Ohio, U.S.
- Died: May 1, 1982 (aged 74); Tarzana, California, U.S.
- Occupations: Actor; mime artist; musician
- Years active: 1934–1970
- Spouse: Margaret McCann (m. 1944)
- Children: 2

Gene Sheldon (born Eugene Hume; February 1, 1908 – May 1, 1982) was an American actor, mime artist, and musician. He is remembered as the mute servant Bernardo in Walt Disney's live-action Spanish Western series Zorro (1957–1959).

== Early life and career ==
Born on February 1, 1908, in Columbus, Ohio, Sheldon attended Dana Avenue Grade School and West High School. He began acting at an early age, serving as stage assistant to his father Earl, a magician. His tasks included appearing as a girl, dressed appropriately but not speaking. He also gained experience as a radio announcer at age 17, broadcasting on Toledo, Ohio radio in 1925.

His film debut was in the 1934 movie Susie's Affairs, as Slug the Banjoist. The next year, he had a small part in the early Fred Astaire, Ginger Rogers musical Roberta as a banjo player in the film's band. In the musical number "Let's Begin", he had a short comedy scene tuning the banjo and he performed in a comedy dance number with Fred Astaire and Candy Candido.

Sheldon appeared in the Broadway revue Priorities of 1942, performing a comedy banjo act in which he did not speak, wearing an outfit resembling the costume of silent film comedian Harry Langdon and mimicking some of Langdon's distinctive gestures.

He appeared in speaking roles as the genie Ali in 20th Century Fox's 1945 films Where Do We Go From Here? and the seal trainer, Professor Winnup in The Dolly Sisters.

An often-seen act, in the "Golden Horseshoe Revue" episode of the Walt Disney anthology television series, was as a banjo player who kept getting his fingers stuck in the strings. After several minutes he would finally get them "un-stuck" and play a vigorous riff on his banjo.

His other speaking roles were banjoist Sam Jordan in the 1951 musical Golden Girl, notorious alcoholic Puffo the Clown in Paramount's 1954 film 3 Ring Circus and in Disney's 1960 film Toby Tyler as Sam Treat, a clown and animal trainer who is one of Toby's mentors and protectors. Toby's other protector, gruff wagon driver Ben Cotter, was played by Henry Calvin, who co-starred on Zorro as Sergeant Garcia.

Sheldon starred in Disney's 1961 Christmas film Babes in Toyland as Barnaby's mute henchman, Roderigo. He was teamed with Calvin once more, as a kind of ersatz Laurel and Hardy.

=== Zorro ===
Sheldon's role was Bernardo, Diego's mute (but not deaf) servant on Zorro. As established in the series' first episode, when Diego de la Vega confides to Bernardo his intention to pretend to be a helpless intellectual rather than a man of action, Bernardo decides to support him by pretending to be deaf. In this way, Bernardo is able to spy for Diego without arousing suspicion. This characterization, an innovation over the deaf-mute Bernardo of the original stories, employed Sheldon's pantomime skills while making the character more integral to the series. Sheldon reprised the role in four further Zorro adventures that appeared on the Walt Disney anthology television series in 1960–1961.

== Personal life ==
Sheldon married Margaret McCann on December 11, 1944 in Las Vegas, Nevada. They had two children.

On May 1, 1982, Sheldon died from a heart attack at his home in Tarzana, California.

== Filmography ==
Year	Title	Role	Notes
1935	Roberta	Banjo-Playing Wabash Indianian	Uncredited
1937	Television Talent	Herbert Dingle	
1938	Star of the Circus	Peters	
1939	Lucky to Me	Hap Hazard	
1945	Where Do We Go from Here?	Ali the Genie	
1945	The Dolly Sisters	Professor Winnup	
1951	Golden Girl	Sam Jordan	
1954	3 Ring Circus	Puffo the Clown	
1957-1961	Zorro	Bernardo	TV series, 82 episodes
1960	Toby Tyler or Ten Weeks with a Circus	Sam Treat	
1961	Babes in Toyland	Roderigo	
