= Peter, Peter, Pumpkin Eater =

English language nursery rhyme

"Peter Peter Pumpkin Eater"
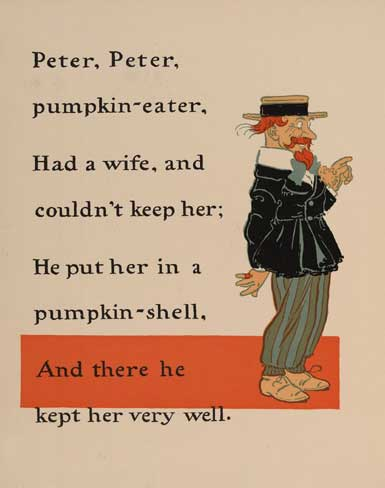
- William Wallace Denslow's illustrations for "Peter Peter Pumpkin Eater", from a 1901 edition of Mother Goose

Nursery rhyme
- Published: c. 1825

"Peter Peter Pumpkin Eater" is an English language nursery rhyme. It has a Roud Folk Song Index number of 13497.

== Lyrics ==
Common modern versions include:

Peter, Peter pumpkin eater,
Had a wife but couldn't keep her;
He put her in a pumpkin shell
And there he kept her very well.

Peter, Peter pumpkin eater,
Had another and didn't leave her;
Peter learned to read and spell,
And then he loved her very well.

== Origins ==
The first surviving version of the rhyme was published in Infant Institutes, part the first: or a Nurserical Essay on the Poetry, Lyric and Allegorical, of the Earliest Ages, &c., in London around 1797. It also appears in Mother Goose's Quarto: or Melodies Complete, printed in Boston, Massachusetts around 1825.

A verse collected from Aberdeen, Scotland and published in 1868 had the words:

Peter, my neeper, (Note: Neighbor.)
Had a wife,
And he couldna' keep her,
He pat her i' the wa',
And lat a' the mice eat her.

This verse is also considered to be an older version of the rhyme Eeper Weeper.
