= Roman McDougald =

American novelist

Roman M. McDougald (1907 – June 3, 1960) was an American mystery writer.

He was born in 1907 in Concordia Parish, Louisiana to Grace M. Wallace E. McDougald. He enlisted in the US Army on November 10, 1942. He died on June 3, 1960.

== Writings ==
- The Deaths of Lora Karen (1944)
- The Whistling Legs (1945)
- Purgatory Street (1946)
- Lady Without Mercy (1948)
- The Woman Under the Mountain (1950)
- The Blushing Monkey (1953)
