= Zorro (1957 TV series) =

American action-adventure Western drama series (1957–1959)

- Genre: Action/Adventure; Comedy drama; Western; Superhero
- Created by: Johnston McCulley (original stories)
- Starring: Guy Williams; Gene Sheldon; Henry Calvin; George J. Lewis
- Country of origin: United States
- No. of seasons: 2
- No. of episodes: 78 (+4 specials) (list of episodes)

Production
- Executive producers: Bill Anderson; Walt Disney
- Running time: 22–24 minutes
- Production company: Walt Disney Productions

Original release
- Network: ABC
- Release: October 10, 1957 – July 2, 1959

Related
- Zorro and Son

Zorro (also known as Disney's Zorro) is an American action-adventure television series produced by Walt Disney Productions and starring Guy Williams. Based on the Zorro character created by Johnston McCulley in his 1919 novella, the series premiered on October 10, 1957, on ABC. The final network broadcast was July 2, 1959. Seventy-eight episodes were produced, and four hour-long specials were aired on the Walt Disney anthology series between October 30, 1960, and April 2, 1961.

The series is set in Los Angeles of 1820, when it was still part of Spanish California and before Mexican independence. Zorro aids Hispanic settlers and indigenous peoples oppressed by the local rulers. A remastering, in which color was added, was released in 1992.

== Plot ==
For most of its run, Zorro's episodes were part of continuing story arcs, each about thirteen episodes long. It had a structure similar to a serial. The first of these chronicles the emergence of Zorro/Diego to California in 1820, having returned from studying in Spain at the behest of his father, Don Alejandro, to help depose the greedy and cruel local Comandante, Captain Enrique Sánchez Monastario. After Monastario's final defeat, in the second storyline, Zorro must uncover and counter Magistrado Carlos Galindo, who is part of a conspiracy to take over rule of California. The third story arc concerns the leader of that conspiracy, José Sebastián de Varga, a shadowy figure known as "The Eagle". It is revealed that Varga intends to make a huge profit by turning California over to another country, which had its own interests on the West Coast.

Season two opens with Diego in Monterey, the colonial capital of Alta California. The authorities are worried that privately collected money to bring a supply ship to California is repeatedly diverted to a gang of bandits. Diego stays to investigate, both as a civilian and as the masked Zorro. He becomes interested in Ana Maria Verdugo, a daughter of the man organizing the effort. Once Zorro defeats the thieves, he enters into a rivalry with his old friend Ricardo del Amo, a practical joker who is also interested in Ana Maria. Ana Maria is in love with Zorro. While in Monterey, Zorro and Sergeant García also get involved in a dispute between the people and a repressive Lieutenant Governor. At the end of the Monterey Arc, Diego/Zorro is on the verge of giving up his mask to marry Ana Maria, but Don Alejandro talks him out of it, revealing that he had figured out his son was Zorro some time ago and convinces Diego that the people still need Zorro. Zorro (and Diego) says goodbye to Ana Maria and returns to Los Angeles, where he gets involved in a series of shorter adventures.

In one three-episode story arc, guest-starring Annette Funicello, Zorro must solve the mystery of Anita Cabrillo's father, a man who does not seem to exist. Other storylines late in the series involve Diego's ne'er-do-well uncle (played by Cesar Romero), a plot against the governor of California, an encounter with an American "mountain man" (Jeff York, reprising a role from The Saga of Andy Burnett), and outwitting a greedy emissary from Spain.

== Episodes ==
| Season | Episodes | Originally released | |
| Season | Episodes | First released | Last released |
|---|---|---|---|
| 1 | 39 | October 10, 1957 | July 3, 1958 |
| 2 | 39 | October 9, 1958 | July 2, 1959 |
| Specials | 4 | October 30, 1960 | April 2, 1961 |

== Characters ==
Bernardo (Gene Sheldon) and Zorro (Guy Williams)

=== Main ===
- Don Diego de la Vega / Zorro (portrayed by Guy Williams) is a former university student, newly recalled by his father, Don Alejandro de la Vega, from Madrid to his home outside El Pueblo de Nuestra Señora Reina de los Angeles sobre El Rio Porciuncula (later shortened to "Los Angeles"). Just before reaching California, Diego learns of the tyranny of Captain Monastario, and realizes that his father, Don Alejandro, summoned him to help fight this injustice. Although he won medals for his fencing back in Spain, Diego decides that his best course of action is to conceal his ability with a sword, and to affect the demeanor of a mild-mannered intellectual rather than a decisive man of action. His alter ego, Zorro, operates primarily at night, taking the direct action that Diego cannot. This deception does not always sit well with Diego, especially as it affects his relationship with his disappointed father. Diego relies heavily on his wits, both with and without the mask on. Later in the series, Diego emerges as a respected figure in his own right, a clever thinker and loyal friend who just happens to be hopeless at swordplay. The character's name in Johnston McCulley's writing and previous adaptations was Diego Vega; the Disney version expands the name to Diego de la Vega, an innovation retained in some subsequent versions of the story. Diego's singing voice is supplied by Bill Lee of The Mellomen.
- Don Alejandro de la Vega (portrayed by George J. Lewis) is Don Diego's father and a hot-tempered cattle baron (or ranchero) with a strong sense of morality and fair play. His cattle and land holdings are said to be among the richest in California, which helps to make Don Alejandro an influential community leader. His impetuous nature often gets him into trouble, however, as he seeks to do battle himself, sometimes getting fooled and manipulated along the way. Don Alejandro eventually learns of his son's identity, and is strongly in favor of Zorro's work continuing.
- Bernardo (portrayed by mime artist Gene Sheldon) is Diego's manservant, confidant and co-conspirator, the only person at first to know Diego's secret. Unable to speak, Bernardo uses sign language or charades to communicate. He pretends to be deaf as well as mute, the better to overhear the plans of Zorro's enemies. While not having a vocal catchphrase, Bernardo often traces a Z in the air while making three swishing sounds with his lips to ask Diego if this is a job for Zorro. He also plays the fool, adopting clownish behavior so as to seem harmless. Although Bernardo is sometimes portrayed as a little silly even when no pretense is required, he is also a capable and invaluable disciple for Zorro and Diego, even wearing the mask himself occasionally when the need arises. The character had appeared in the original stories as both deaf and mute; giving him hearing in this iteration helped to make Bernardo more integral to the series as Zorro's secret agent. It also helped to advance the plot by giving Diego a partner with whom he could confide feelings, plans, and intended actions, while also communicating these things to the viewers. This character was originally a Native American, but is a full-blooded Spaniard in this depiction.
- Sergeant Demetrio López García (portrayed by Henry Calvin) is fat, superstitious, and overfond of drink, but also kind-hearted, brave and loyal. Sergeant García believes that he must obey orders from his commanding officers, however cruel or unjust they may be. He tries to soften the blow with his friendly manner, often saying "Please?" as he issues an unpalatable order to a civilian. Although García seldom departs from his sworn duty, he develops considerable respect for Zorro and later in the series is openly glad when Zorro escapes capture. Nevertheless, García dreams of catching Zorro himself to collect the reward money, a dream that Diego encourages from time to time. Despite not being a great swordsman, García makes up for it in brute strength and quick thinking whenever he is forced to fight. Nonetheless, he occasionally demonstrates fair swordsmanship like during a brief duel in episode 36 ("The Sergeant Regrets"). He also has an excellent singing voice, and performs a number of songs over the course of the series, usually with mug in hand. García replaces McCulley's Sergeant Gonzales from the original stories, played by Noah Beery Sr. as a hardcore villain in the 1920 film version starring Douglas Fairbanks.

=== Recurring ===
- Don Diamond as Corporal Reyes (Magistrado storyline and onward) - the second non-commissioned officer alongside Sergeant García, introduced midway through Season 1, who became Sergeant García's sidekick after the arrest of Monastario. Despite being blunt and slow-witted, Reyes is a loyal soldier and is not unfriendly to others. He is ironically belittled sometimes by García the same way that Monastario used to belittle García, but not in such an overly abusive way. Diamond also appeared uncredited (and with no mustache) as Lancer Yvarro in an earlier episode, "Zorro's Ride Into Terror"
- Britt Lomond as Captain Enrique Sánchez Monastario (season 1) - the evil but dashing Commandante was Zorro's first continuing foe, both on screen and at Disneyland. Lomond initially auditioned for the Zorro role, and, after Williams was chosen, became the ideal candidate for the villain due to his fencing abilities. Monastario replaces McCulley's Captain Ramon from the original stories.
- Nestor Paiva appears, usually uncredited, in 14 episodes (during both seasons) as the innkeeper, known as either Tio Gonzales or Señor Pacheco.
- Than Wyenn as Licenciado Piña (season 1) - Monastario's adjutant and lawyer. At the time of Wyenn's death in 2015 he was the last surviving member of the main cast from the first 13 episodes.
- Jan Arvan as Don Ignacio Torres (season 1) - local don who is arrested by Monastario for speaking out. He is often known as 'Don Nacho'.
- Romney Brent as Padre Felipe (season 1) - a priest at the Mission of San Gabriel and a friend to Diego. He provides Church sanctuary to Torres before he escapes to Monterey.
- Henry Rowland as Count Kolinko (season 1) - Varga's conspirator.
- Vinton Hayworth as Magistrate Carlos Galindo (season 1) - the local leader of a conspiracy to take over California. He would later become well-known as General Winfield Schaeffer in seasons 4 and 5 of the comedy series I Dream of Jeannie (which would be his final role).
- Jay Novello as Juan Greco (season 1) - Varga's conspirator.
- Charles Korvin as José Sebastián de Varga (season 1) - the man Galindo was working for, self-styled "the Eagle".
- Steve Stevens as Don Rodolfo (season 1) - one of the local dons, who vacillates on his commitment to help defend Los Angeles from the conspirators.
- Jolene Brand as Ana María Verdugo (season 2) - the first love interest for Diego and Zorro, based in Monterey.
- Gloria Talbott as Moneta Esperon (season 2) - the second love interest for Diego and Zorro.
- Joan Evans as Leonor (season 2) - the daughter of the governor and the third love interest for Diego and Zorro.
- Eduard Franz as Señor Gregorio Verdugo (season 2) - Ana Maria's father, leader of a group trying to finance bringing a supply ship to California.
- Richard Anderson as Ricardo del Amo (season 2) - Diego's old friend and rival who is also courting Ana Maria. He would later be best-known for his role as Oscar Goldman, boss of Steve Austin (Lee Majors) and Jaime Sommers (Lindsay Wagner) in both The Six Million Dollar Man and The Bionic Woman television series respectively, which aired between 1974 and 1978, a role he would reprise in the subsequent television movies: The Return of the Six Million Dollar Man and the Bionic Woman (1987), Bionic Showdown: The Six Million Dollar Man and the Bionic Woman (1989) and Bionic Ever After? (1994).
- Cesar Romero as Esteban de la Cruz (season 2) - Diego's uncle, an aging gigolo with a dishonest streak and a propensity for trouble. Romero would later become famous for his role as the Joker on the TV series Batman (1966–1968), his recurring supervillain role throughout the series' run and in the 1966 film.
- Rodolfo Hoyos Jr., as Vivera in "El Bandido" and "Adios, El Cuchillo" (both 1 hour episodes), and as Montez in "Finders Keepers" (season 2)
- Annette Funicello as Anita Cabrillo (season 2) - a young woman who comes to Los Angeles to see her father, except that nobody has ever heard of him; Funicello was given the role as a birthday present from Walt Disney himself since he was the only one who knew about her big crush on Guy Williams (who was in fact married to Janice Cooper). Funicello also appeared in the 1-hour episode The Postponed Wedding, where she played Constancia de la Torre, a girl who is scheduled to be married. She would later become well-known for her roles in a series of "Beach Party" films starring alongside Frankie Avalon throughout the 1960s, and a reunion film, Back to the Beach (1987), again alongside Avalon.
- Everett Sloane as Andrés Felipe Basilio (season 2) - another of Zorro's foes, a greedy official who gathers treasure for Spain but seeks to keep it for himself.
- John Litel as Governor of California (season 2) - honest but petulant, the governor is the subject of two conspiracies against him, and Diego's house guest at the time.
- Rodolfo Acosta as Perico Verdugo (season 1) - a prospector confederate with the Magistrate to investigate if indeed there is gold in California.
- Eugenia Paul as Elena Torres
- Suzanne Lloyd as Raquel Toledano, the wife of Captain Arturo Toledano. Lloyd also appears in an unrelated role in Zorro: Auld Acquaintance as Isabella Linares, a guest at the de la Vega's hacienda.
- Peter Adams as Captain Arturo Toledano, a just and fair Commandante who is unaware of his wife's collaboration with "the Eagle".
- Jonathan Harris as Carlos Fernandez (season 2) - Harris later co-starred with Williams on the original Lost in Space TV series which ran from 1965 through 1968.
- Tony Russel (billed as Tony Russo) as Carlos Martinez, a man Monastario employs to disguise as Zorro and commit a robbery in order to give Zorro a bad name. Russel also played Pedro Avila, a character who challenges Diego and Don Alejandro to duel in "An Affair Of Honor", an episode of Season 2. Russel initially auditioned for the Zorro role, as did Britt Lomond.
- Fred Cavens was the Fencing Consultant of the series and appeared uncredited in various episodes, as did his son Albert Cavens, who also stunt-doubled for some of the guest actors in the fencing scenes.

== Production ==
The main exterior sets (the plaza, the cuartel, the tavern, etc.) were built in the Disney backlot in Burbank, California, while Don Diego's hacienda was built in a soundstage. Some scenes were shot at the Disney Ranch and at Mission San Luis Rey near Oceanside, where an archway was added to an existing structure.

== Broadcast ==
The show was very popular, especially with children. Its theme song (written by Norman Foster and George Bruns and first recorded by the Mellomen) was a hit recording for The Chordettes, peaking at number 17 on the Hit Parade. Children inspired by the series produced "Z" graffiti on school desks and walls across the United States.

Despite good ratings (number 30 in season 1 with a 26.6 rating), the series ended after two seasons due to a financial dispute between Disney and the network over ownership of Zorro, Mickey Mouse Club, and the Disney anthology television series (at the time titled Disneyland). During the legal battle, Disney produced four new hour-long Zorro adventures of the franchise, aired on the anthology series: Zorro: El Bandido (October 30, 1960); Zorro: Adios El Cuchillo (November 6, 1960); Zorro: The Postponed Wedding (January 1, 1961); and Zorro: Auld Acquaintance (April 2, 1961). Guy Williams was kept on full salary during this period. By the time Disney and ABC resolved their differences, Walt Disney decided that public interest in the character had flagged. Disney continued to pay $3,500 per year until 1967 to retain the television rights.

Reruns of the series aired on the Disney Channel starting the day the channel launched on April 18, 1983. These continued until September 9, 2002.

The 1957–1959 episodes were colorized in 1992. For a time they appeared in that format on the Disney Channel and elsewhere, often alternating with the original black-and-white versions. The series aired for ten years.

Cozi TV aired reruns of the series from January 5, 2015, to December 31, 2016. Reruns of this series began airing on Grit on September 1, 2024. It remained on that television network until September of 2026 with The Texan replacing it.

== Home media ==
=== VHS ===
Several compilations from the series were issued on VHS over the years but are now out of print. It was released on video in 1985 and 1993. They are as follows:

VHS television episodes

- Volume 1 – The Secret of El Zorro (four episodes) ISBN 1-55890-341-0
- Volume 2 – Zorro and the Mountain Man (three episodes) ISBN 1-55890-339-9
- Volume 3 – The Mystery of Don Cabrillo (three episodes) ISBN 1-55890-340-2
- Volume 4 – Invitation to Death (four episodes) ISBN 1-55890-362-3
- Volume 5 – The Gay Caballero (four episodes) ISBN 1-55890-173-6
- Volume 6 – The Man from Spain (four episodes) ISBN 1-55890-175-2

=== DVD releases ===
Two volumes from season one of Zorro were released on DVD in the United States in 2006, representing the entire Monastario storyline and the beginning of the Magistrado Galindo storyline. Three more volumes soon followed, completing the season, which was then reissued as a boxed set entitled Zorro, the Complete First Season. All of the DVDs were only available from the Disney Movie Club. Each volume contains the 1992 colorized version of about eight episodes. No special features are included.

- Walt Disney's Zorro, Season 1, Volume 1 ISBN 0-7888-7103-X
- Walt Disney's Zorro, Season 1, Volume 2 ISBN 0-7888-7104-8
- Walt Disney's Zorro, Season 1, Volume 3 ISBN 0-7888-7250-8
- Walt Disney's Zorro, Season 1, Volume 4 ISBN 0-7888-7251-6
- Walt Disney's Zorro, Season 1, Volume 5 ISBN 0-7888-7253-2

The Disney Movie Club released the second season in a boxed set, also consisting of five volumes and also colorized.

| DVD name | Ep # | Release date |
|---|---|---|
| Season 1 | 39 | November 3, 2009 |
| Season 2 | 39 | November 3, 2009 |

Walt Disney Studios Home Entertainment released the entire series on DVD in Region 1 on November 3, 2009, under their Walt Disney Treasures banner featuring several bonus features. It was available for a limited time, before entering moratorium and put back in the Disney Vault along with the other Walt Disney Treasures DVD sets.

==== International releases ====
The following international regions are available:

- Zorro, Saison 1 (French box set, original English language available) ASIN B0000VKLP8
- Zorro, Seizoen 1 (Dutch box set) EAN 8717418063412
- Zorro, Saison 2 (French box set, original English language available) ASIN B001927NGW
- Zorro, La Prima Serie Completa (Italian box set, English language available) ASIN B0047RUSM2

=== Streaming ===
Disney+ released the series on October 5, 2022. It has had the movie The Sign of Zorro made from some of its episodes since its launch on November 12, 2019.

== Other appearances ==
Guy Williams was introduced to the Disney audience as Zorro in a segment of the Disney anthology television series, The Fourth Anniversary Show. During this episode, which stars the Mouseketeers and features upcoming shows, Moochie (Kevin Corcoran) repeatedly asks Walt Disney, "What about Zorro?" Zorro appears, but not in the same shot with the Mouseketeers. Zorro explains who he is, and coyly answers the question of whether he is "real".

Williams and other key cast members also made a number of live appearances at Disneyland in 1958. Some of their shows involved Zorro and Monastario battling each other on the rooftops of Frontierland.

Robert L. Crawford Jr., brother of Mouseketeer Johnny Crawford, prior to being cast on NBC's Laramie in the role of Andy Sherman, appeared on Zorro in the role of Pogo Bastinado in the episodes "The Well of Death" and "The Cross of the Andes" in May 1958.

George J. Lewis, who portrays Diego's father Don Alejandro, had previously appeared in the 1944 serial Zorro's Black Whip as Vic Gordon, an ally of the Black Whip.

== Revivals ==
In 1983 a comedy follow-up, Zorro and Son, aired on CBS. The series was shot in color on many of the same studio lots where the original was filmed. Featuring none of the original cast (Henry Calvin and Gene Sheldon had died in 1975 and 1982, while Guy Williams walked out after a script dispute), the show performed poorly in the ratings.

== In other media ==
=== Comics ===
Comics based on the Zorro character had already appeared before the Disney TV series. When the Disney TV show became popular new comics were published under the banner Walt Disney Presents: Zorro and the artwork reflected the way the characters looked in the TV version. The Disney: Zorro comics were drawn by Alex Toth. In the Netherlands Hans G. Kresse also drew a comic strip version based on this particular TV series.

=== Theatrical ===
Two film compilations from the series were released theatrically:

- The Sign of Zorro (overseas, 1958, U.S. 1960; based on the Monastario storyline)

In this film, edited from eight episodes of Disney's hit TV series, Don Diego returns home to find his town under the heel of a cruel dictator, Capitan Monastario. Diego dons the mask of Zorro to fight the evil commandant's tyranny, and, with the help of his mute servant Bernardo, free the pueblo from his oppression.

- Zorro the Avenger (overseas, 1959; based on the end of the Eagle storyline)

Compiled from six episodes of the original Disney Zorro series, this film has El Zorro, "The Fox", battling Jose Sebastian Varga, "The Eagle", a corrupt dictator set on taking control of all of Spanish California.
