= The Rainbow Road to Oz =

Disney unreleased 1950s film

The Rainbow Road to Oz was a proposed, but never finished, Walt Disney Studios 1950s live-action film about characters in the Land of Oz. Inspired by L. Frank Baum's early 20th century Oz novels, it was to have starred some of the Mouseketeers, including Darlene Gillespie as Dorothy Gale and Annette Funicello as Princess Ozma, as well as Bobby Burgess as the Scarecrow, Doreen Tracey as the Patchwork Girl, Jimmie Dodd as the Cowardly Lion, Tommy Kirk as the villainous son of the Wicked Witch of the West, and Kevin Corcoran.

In 1954, when the film rights to Baum's remaining thirteen Oz books were made available, Walt Disney Productions acquired them for use in Walt Disney's television series Disneyland. The original plan was for a two-part episode based on The Patchwork Girl of Oz. When plans grew too ambitious for television, the studio instead decided to produce a large-scale live-action film using the Mouseketeers. The feature, to be called The Rainbow Road to Oz, was announced in July 1957. Preview segments from the film aired on September 11, 1957, on Disneyland's fourth-anniversary show. The preview consisted of three musical numbers from the prospective film, "Patches", "The Oz-Kan Hop", and the title song "The Rainbow Road to Oz". The project was shelved only a few months later, possibly for budgetary reasons or concern that the young actors, known for television, would not be able to carry a feature film.

Songs written for the film by Buddy Baker, Tom Adair and Helen Adair were rerecorded by Tutti Camarata and The Mike Sammes Singers for the 1969 Disneyland Records album The Cowardly Lion of Oz.

In 2013, Walt Disney Studios produced a documentary called "Walt Disney and the Road to Oz" detailing the story of The Rainbow Road to Oz as a supplement to the home video release of Oz the Great and Powerful, featuring cast members Doreen Tracey and Bobby Burgess as well as historians Howard Green, Les Perkins and Greg Ehrbar.
