= Roy Steiner =

Roy Steiner may refer to:

- Roy Steiner (dancer), American tap dancer of The Steiner Brothers
- Rebel Roy Steiner, Sr, American football player
