= Karen Pendleton =

American actress (1946–2019)

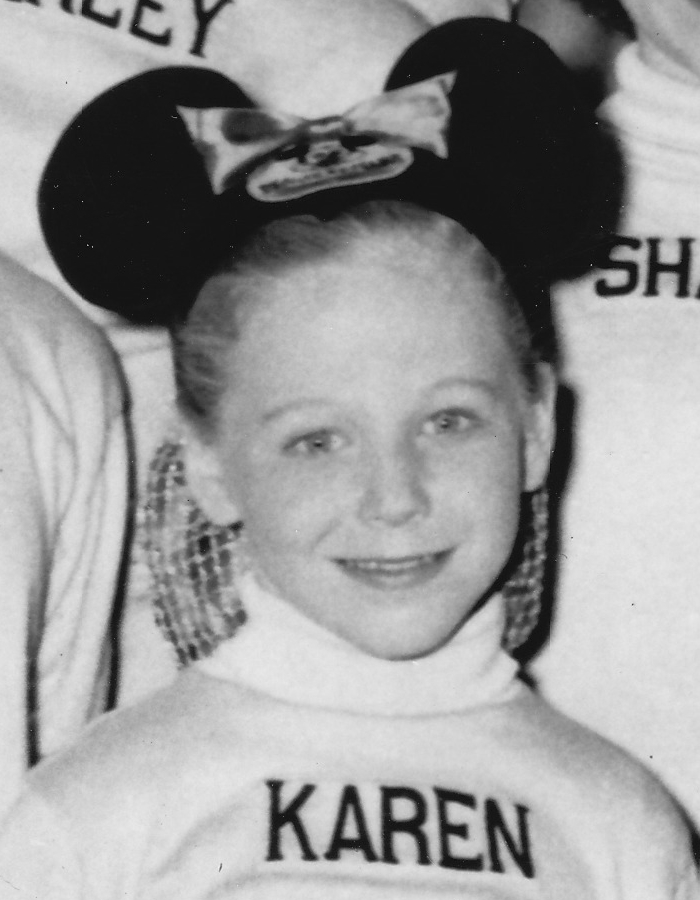
- Karen Pendleton as a Mouseketeer on The Mickey Mouse Club in circa 1956
- Born: Karen Anita Pendleton; August 1, 1946
- Died: October 6, 2019 (aged 73); Fresno, California
- Occupation: Actress
- Spouse: Del Michael De Lauer (1970-1985, divorce)
- Children: 1

Karen Anita Pendleton (August 1, 1946 – October 6, 2019) was an original Mickey Mouse Club Mouseketeer on the ABC television series from 1955 to 1959. She was one of only nine Mouseketeers who were on the show during its entire original run.

Pendleton was recruited to audition for the Mickey Mouse Club when Disney producers visited a Los Angeles dance studio seeking young talent. She toured Australia in 1959 and 1960 with a number of other Mouseketeers and Jimmie Dodd. She was often coupled with Carl "Cubby" O'Brien in the television series and in live performances, as they were the youngest members of the cast.

After the show's run, she left show business and graduated from North Hollywood High School. She married Del Michael De Lauer in 1970, had a daughter in 1973, but divorced in 1985. Following an automobile accident in 1983, in which she was paralyzed from the waist down, she returned to college and earned a bachelor's degree in psychology from Fresno State University. She worked at a shelter for battered women and served on the board for the California Association of the Physically Handicapped.

Pendleton died of a heart attack at the age of 73 on October 6, 2019.

== Filmography ==
- Westward Ho the Wagons! (1956)
- Walt Disney's Disneyland (1954)
