= Fonte =

Fonte means fountain, source and/or spring in several languages, and is thus present in many toponyms and titles. It may also refer to:

== People ==
- Allison Fonte (born 1964), American actress and pianist
- Artur Fonte (born 1959), Portuguese football player
- Bartholomew de Fonte, Spanish admiral involved in the early knowledge of the Pacific Northwest
- César Fonte (born 1986), Portuguese cyclist
- Emanuele Fonte (born 1992), Italian football player
- Francesco Fonte (born 1965), Italian football player
- Jeanne de la Fonte, birth name of Renée Adorée (1898–1933), French actress
- John Fonte, philosopher involved in transnational progressivism
- José Fonte (born 1983), Portuguese football player
- Marcello Fonte (born 1978), Italian actor
- Maria Inês Fonte (born 2002), Portuguese tennis player
- Mike da Fonte (born 1991), American football player
- Moderata Fonte (1555–1592), Venetian writer and poet
- Pedro José de Fonte y Hernández Miravete (1777–1839), Mexican archbishop
- Rui Fonte (born 1990), Portuguese football player

== Places ==
- Fonte, Veneto, Treviso, Italy
- Fonte River, Guam
- Fonte Boa, Amazonas, Brazil
