= Hollywood Professional School =

Former school in California, United States

Coordinates: 34.101807°N 118.307143°W

Hollywood Professional School was a private school in Hollywood, California. Initially established as a music conservatory by pianist Gladys T. Littell in 1921 under the name Hollywood Conservatory of Music and Arts, the school quickly expanded its offerings into theater and dance as well as music. In 1929 the Hollywood Professional School (HPS) was established by Viola Foss Lawler as a companion private school to the conservatory, with both schools operating legally as a single institution under the Hollywood Conservatory of Music and Arts name. In 1944 the school was purchased by Bertha Keller Mann and it ceased teaching the arts and became solely a private school teaching traditional academic subjects in grades K-12 to mostly children working in the entertainment business or competitive athletics in Los Angeles. It operated until 1985.

== History ==
=== Hollywood Conservatory of Music and Arts ===
The Hollywood Professional School (HPS) was established in 1921 by pianist Gladys T. Littell under the name the Hollywood Conservatory of Music and Arts (HCMA). The HCMA taught both children in a pre-professional program and young adults on a pre-professional conservatory track of development. Originally the school only offered instruction in string instruments, piano, and vocal music, with instruction in singing initially being led by Louis Graveure, and Frances Kendig teaching piano and music theory, and string instruction by Zoellner. For the Fall of 1924, bandmaster, clarinetist, and composer Albert Perfect joined the faculty of the school when it expanded its offering to include woodwinds and brass instruments. At the same time Modest Altschuler was a visiting lecturer at the institution, and Russian pianist Alexander Kosloff joined the piano faculty. Soon after, Bruno David Ussher was hired to teach music history for the school, Arthur Kachel was hired to teach acting in the tradition of Leland T. Powers, Roy Harris was hired as an instructor in ear training, and Jean Galeron taught French and diction for singers.

Several important appointments were made in December 1924 for the beginning of the Spring 1925 academic semester, including the appointment of the HCMA's first official administrative director, its founder Gladys T. Littell. Hugo Kirchhofer was appointed as the head of the vocal music department, and Lizeta Kalova taking over the strings department. In 1925 the HCMA moved into new premises at 5400 Hollywood Boulevard at Serrano Avenue with a recital on November 17, 1925. Opera singer Alma Stetzler taught singing at the school in the late 1920s. German concert pianist and composer Georg Liebling was a member of the piano faculty in the early 1930s. The school presented numerous student recitals and productions during the 1920s and early 1930s, as well as hosting concerts given by established professionals. During the late 1930s and early 1940s the conservatory portion of school reduced steadily. The HPS continued to operate at the HCMA under Littell.

In 1944 Littell sold the HCMA to Bertha Keller Mann and it ceased teaching the arts. The HPS private school became the sole focus of the institution. In 1948 the school was enrolling students K-12 and operating under the name the Hollywood Professional School while legally still existing under its former name, the Hollywood Conservatory of Music and Arts, on paper. Many of the pupils who attended the school were children working in show business, operating mornings only so that the children could work in the afternoon. It closed down in June 1985 due to insufficient enrollment and the death of the owner that same year. The school's building and many of its assets were auctioned in August 1985.

=== Hollywood Professional School ===
In 1929 Viola Foss Lawler established the Hollywood Professional School (HPS) at 5402 Hollywood Boulevard as a private school addition to the HCMA. This allowed students at the conservatory to attend grammar school and secondary school classes while studying subjects like music and drama. Lawler's school focused on catering to children in the entertainment business, following a similar model pioneered by the Professional Children's School in New York City. By 1930 there were close to 300 students enrolled in the first through 12th grades at HPS.

Lawler parted ways with the HCMA in 1937 to establish her own independent school, the Lawler Professional School which was later known as the Mar-Ken Professional School. Martha O'Driscoll's mother was a financial partner in the Mar-Ken Professional Children's School.

== Notable alumni ==
- Beverly Aadland, actress
- Dick Addrisi of "The Addrisi Brothers"
- Donna Atwood, figure skater
- Jill Banner, actress
- John Drew Barrymore, actor
- Molly Bee, singer
- Valerie Bertinelli, actress
- Henry Blair, child actor
- Barbara Bouchet, actress
- Jimmy Boyd, actor, singer
- Todd Bridges, actor
- Lonnie Burr, actor, dancer
- Tony Butala, singer (member of The Lettermen)
- John Hope Bryant, entrepreneur and actor
- Charles L. Campbell, sound editor
- Roger Campbell, ice skater and Olympic medalist
- Jo Ann Castle, pianist
- Cyd Charisse, dancer and actress
- Tommy Cole, actor, makeup artist
- Larry Collins, singer
- Lorrie Collins, singer
- The Cowsills, singing group
- Martha Crawford Cantarini, actress
- Joan Davis, actress, comedian
- Gloria DeHaven, actress
- Bobby Driscoll, actor
- Edith Fellows, actress
- Peggy Fleming, Olympic figure skater, television sports commentator
- Annette Funicello, actress
- Judy Garland, singer, actress
- Leif Garrett, actor, singer
- John Gary, singer
- Lisa Gaye, actress
- Wally George, talk-show host
- Barry Gordon, actor, former Screen Actors Guild President
- Peter Gowland, photographer
- Scott Walker singer, experimental composer the Walker Brothers
- Betty Grable, actress, singer, dancer
- Urbie Green, trombonist
- Melanie Griffith, actress
- Arthur Hamilton, song writer
- Sherry Jackson, actress
- Larry Kert, actor, singer, dancer
- Val Kilmer, actor
- Tommy Kirk, actor
- Christopher Knight, actor
- Marta Kristen, actress
- Mickey Kuhn, actor
- Piper Laurie, actress
- Brenda Lee, singer
- Roberta Linn, singer
- Peggy Lipton, actress
- Michael Lloyd, musician, producer, screen composer
- Julie London, actress, singer
- Mike Lookinland, actor
- Skip E. Lowe, actor, comedian, television host
- Susan Luckey, actress
- Sue Lyon, actress
- David Marks guitarist, singer (member of The Beach Boys
- Billy and Bobby Mauch, actors
- Eddy Medora, guitarist (member of The Sunrays)
- Maureen McCormick, actress, singer
- Ann Miller, actress, dancer, singer
- Shirley Mills, actress
- Yvette Mimieux, actress
- Marrian Murray, Canadian figure skating champion
- Donald O'Connor, actor, dancer
- Susan Olsen, actress
- Cubby O'Brien, actor, drummer
- Griffin O'Neal, actor
- Ryan O'Neal, actor
- Tatum O'Neal, actress
- Annette O'Toole, actress
- Debra Paget, actress
- Butch Patrick, actor
- Melody Patterson, actress
- Mackenzie Phillips, actress
- Tommy Rall, dancer, singer, actor
- Angel Romero, guitarist
- Mickey Rooney, actor
- Peggy Ryan, actress, dancer
- Lugene Sanders, actress
- Jill St. John, actress
- Karen Sharpe, actress
- Mark Spiegler, talent agent
- The Steiner Brothers (tap-dancing trio)
- Connie Stevens, actress
- Matthew Ward, singer
- Tone Loc, rapper
- Tuesday Weld, actress
- Virginia Weidler, actress
- Andy Williams, singer
- Carl Wilson, singer, guitarist (member of The Beach Boys)
- Lana Wood, actress
- Natalie Wood, actress
