= Live in Japan (The Carpenters album) =

Live album by the Carpenters
- Released: March 7, 1975
- Recorded: June 7–9, 1974
- Venues: Festival Hall (Osaka, Japan)
- Genre: Pop
- Length: 59:15
- Labels: A&M; King; Universal
- Producers: Richard & Karen Carpenter

The Carpenters chronology
Now & Then (1973)	Live in Japan (1975)	Horizon (1975)

Live in Japan is the first live album by the American pop music duo the Carpenters released on Asian market.

The album is notable to include a version of "Sing" with the children's chorus sung by the Kyoto Children's Choir. The song "Sh-Boom" is mistitled.

== Track listing ==
Side one
No.	Title	Writer(s)	Length
1.	"Superstar"/"Rainy Days and Mondays"/"Goodbye to Love"/"Top of the World"/"Help!" (medley)	Bonnie Bramlett; Leon Russell / Roger Nichols; Paul Williams / Richard Carpenter; John Bettis / Carpenter; Bettis / John Lennon; Paul McCartney	13:24

Side two
No.	Title	Writer(s)	Length
2.	"Mr. Guder"	Carpenter; Bettis	3:52
3.	"(They Long to Be) Close to You"	Burt Bacharach; Hal David	4:07
4.	"Jambalaya (On the Bayou)"	Hank Williams; Moon Mullican	3:22
5.	"Yesterday Once More"	Carpenter; Bettis	1:38
6.	"Hurting Each Other"	Peter Udell; Gary Geld	2:13

Side three
No.	Title	Writer(s)	Length
7.	"Little Honda"/"The End of the World"/"Runaway"/"Da Doo Ron Ron"/"Leader of the Pack"/"Johnny Angel"/"Book of Love"/"Shuboom"/"Daddy’s Home"/"Johnny B. Goode" (oldies medley)	Brian Wilson; Mike Love / Sylvia Dee; Arthur Kent / Del Shannon; Max Crook / Jeff Barry; Ellie Greenwich; Phil Spector / Barry; Greenwich; Morton / Lee Pockriss; Lyn Duddy / Warren Davis; Charles Patrick; George Malone / Carl Feaster; Claude Feaster; James Keyes; Floyd Mcrae; James Edwards / James Sheppard; William Miller / Chuck Berry	17:15

Side four
No.	Title	Writer(s)	Length
8.	"Introduction: Colonel Bogey"/"Sing"	Kenneth J. Alford / Joe Raposo; (Japanese Lyric:Rumiko Hoshika)	4:26
9.	"Sometimes"	Henry Mancini; Felice Mancini	2:39
10.	"We've Only Just Begun"	Nichols; Williams	4:22
11.	"For All We Know"	Fred Karlin; Arthur James; Robb Wilson	3:13

== Personnel ==
Musicians

- Karen Carpenter – vocals, drums
- Richard Carpenter – piano, synthesizer, vocals
- Tony Peluso – guitar, organ, electric bass, synthesizer
- Danny Woodhams – bass, vocals
- Cubby O'Brien – drums
- Doug Strawn – clarinet, organ, vocals
- Bob Messenger – electric bass, flute, tenor saxophone
- Pete Henderson – vocals
- Kyoto Children's Choir – chorus

Production

- Karen Carpenter – co-producer
- Richard Carpenter – co-producer, arranger, orchestrations
- Ray Gerhardt – engineer
- Kazuo Nagao – engineer
- Roger Young – engineer

== Charts ==
=== Weekly charts ===
Chart (1975)	Peak position
Japanese Albums (Oricon	8

=== Year-end charts ===
Chart (1975)	Peak position
Japanese Albums (Oricon	37
