= Doreen Tracey =

English actress (1943–2018)

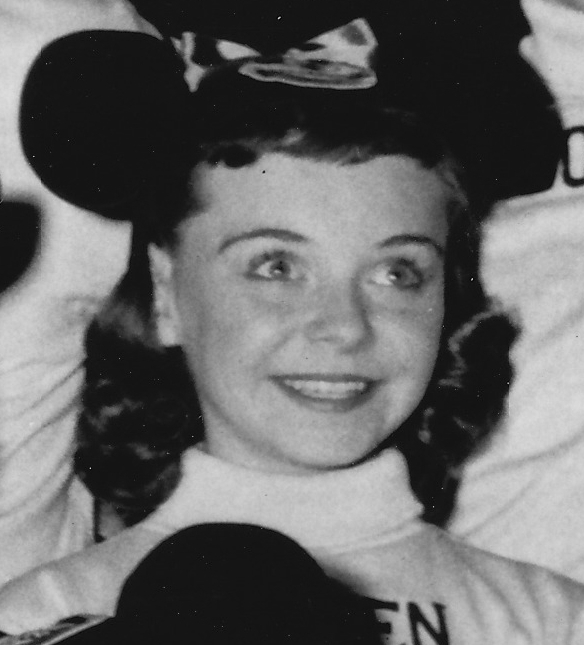
- Tracey in Mickey Mouse Club (1957)
- Born: Doreen Isabelle Tracey; April 3, 1943; St Pancras, London, England, UK
- Died: January 10, 2018 (aged 74); Thousand Oaks, California, U.S.
- Occupations: Actress, performer
- Years active: 1953–2018
- Spouse: Robert Washburn (m. 1961; div. 1962)
- Children: 1

Doreen Isabelle Tracey (April 13, 1943 – January 10, 2018) was an American performer who appeared on the original Mickey Mouse Club television show from 1955 to 1959.

== Early life ==
Tracey was born in St Pancras, London, England. Her parents, Sidney Tracey and Bessie Hay, were an American vaudeville dance team that performed for Allied soldiers during World War II. Her father's original name was Murray Katzelnick. He emigrated to the United States from Russia with his Jewish parents as an infant.

== Career ==
When Doreen was four, her family returned to the United States, where her father first ran a nightclub, then opened a dance studio in Hollywood, California. She learned to dance and sing at an early age, courtesy of the many instructors and performers who worked out at her father's studio. Her first professional work was an uncredited singing and dancing bit in the musical film The Farmer Takes a Wife (1953). At age twelve she auditioned for the Disney's Mickey Mouse Club and was hired. She appeared for all three seasons of the show's original run.

In 1956, Tracey was featured in the Disney western Westward Ho, the Wagons!, and in the third season of the Mickey Mouse Club, had a role in the serial Annette. She was cast as Scraps, the Patchwork Girl, in a musical number from the proposed live-action Disney film The Rainbow Road to Oz on an episode of the Disneyland television show in September 1957. The movie was never made, and when the Mickey Mouse Club was cancelled in 1958, Tracey switched to singing live at concerts and teen nightclubs.

Tracey appeared on several television programs, including the episode "April Fool" (April 1, 1959), of ABC's The Donna Reed Show, with James Darren in a guest-starring role as well. She ended her career as a performer by touring American military bases in South Vietnam and Thailand and performing lead vocals for a rock group called "Doreen and the Invaders".

Tracey later worked as a publicist at Warner Bros. Records where she promoted acts including Frank Zappa and the Doobie Brothers. For awhile, she was also an amateur weightlifter. Tracey twice posed nude for the sex magazine Gallery in 1976 and 1979; as a result, she was excluded from Mouseketeer reunions and official Disney functions for several years thereafter. She later reconciled with Disney and expressed regret at having posed for the photos. In 2001, an excerpt from her unpublished memoir originally cowritten with celebrity biographer Jeff Lenburg, Confessions of a Mouseketeer, was published in the NPR anthology I Thought My Father Was God.

== Personal life ==
Tracey married Robert Washburn and had a son, but the marriage ended in divorce. In 2018, after having cancer for two years, Tracey died of pneumonia at a hospital in Thousand Oaks, California at the age of 74.
