= Kathleen Crowley =

American actress (1929–2017)

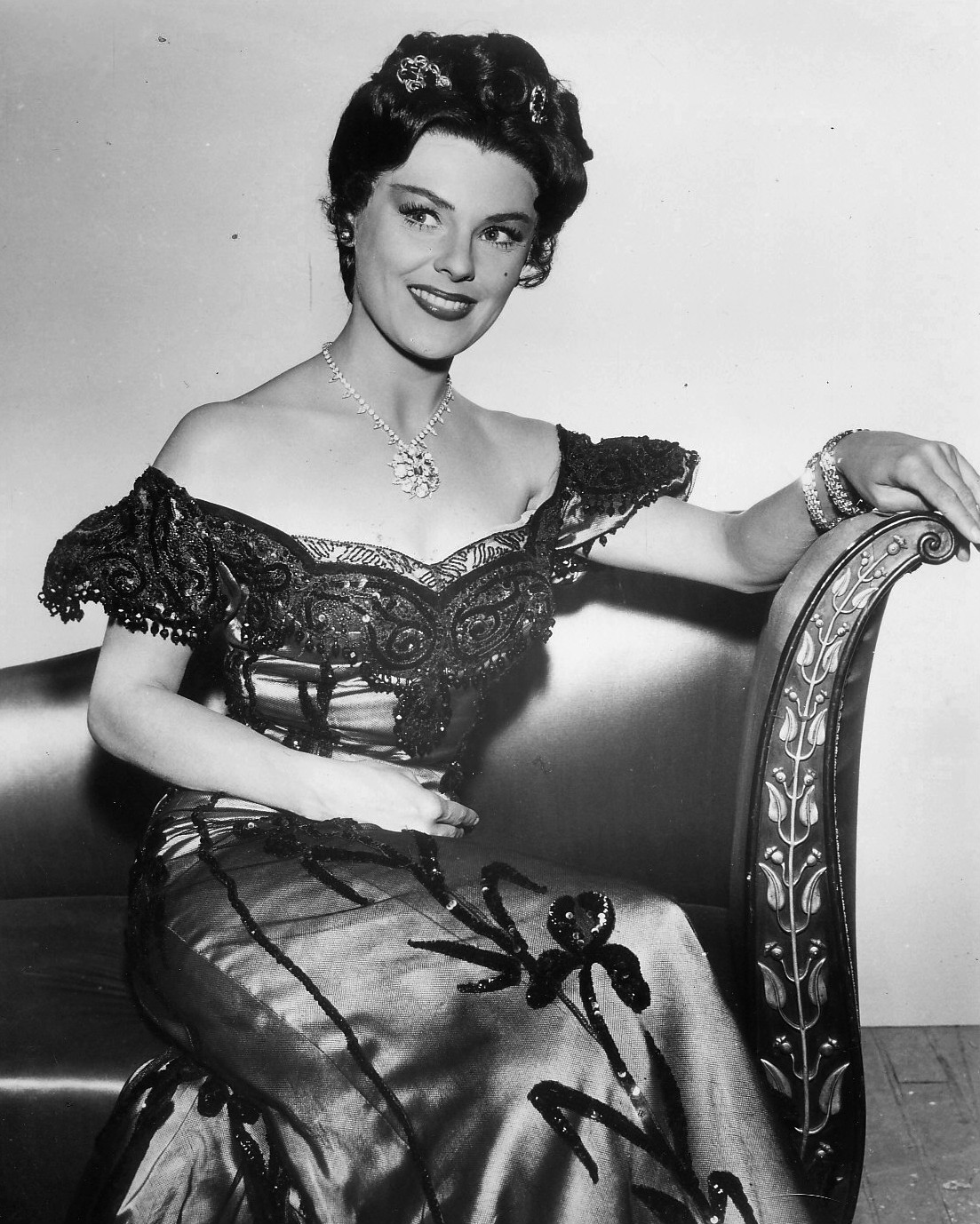
- Crowley as Kiz in Maverick (1960)
- Born: Betty Jane Crowley; December 26, 1929; Green Bank, New Jersey, U.S.
- Died: April 23, 2017 (aged 87); Green Bank, New Jersey, U.S.
- Other name: Kathleen Rubsam
- Education: American Academy of Dramatic Arts
- Occupation: Actress
- Years active: 1951–1970
- Known for: Maverick; 77 Sunset Strip; Waterfront; Target Earth
- Title: Miss New Jersey 1949
- Spouse: John Rubsam (m. 1969)
- Children: 1

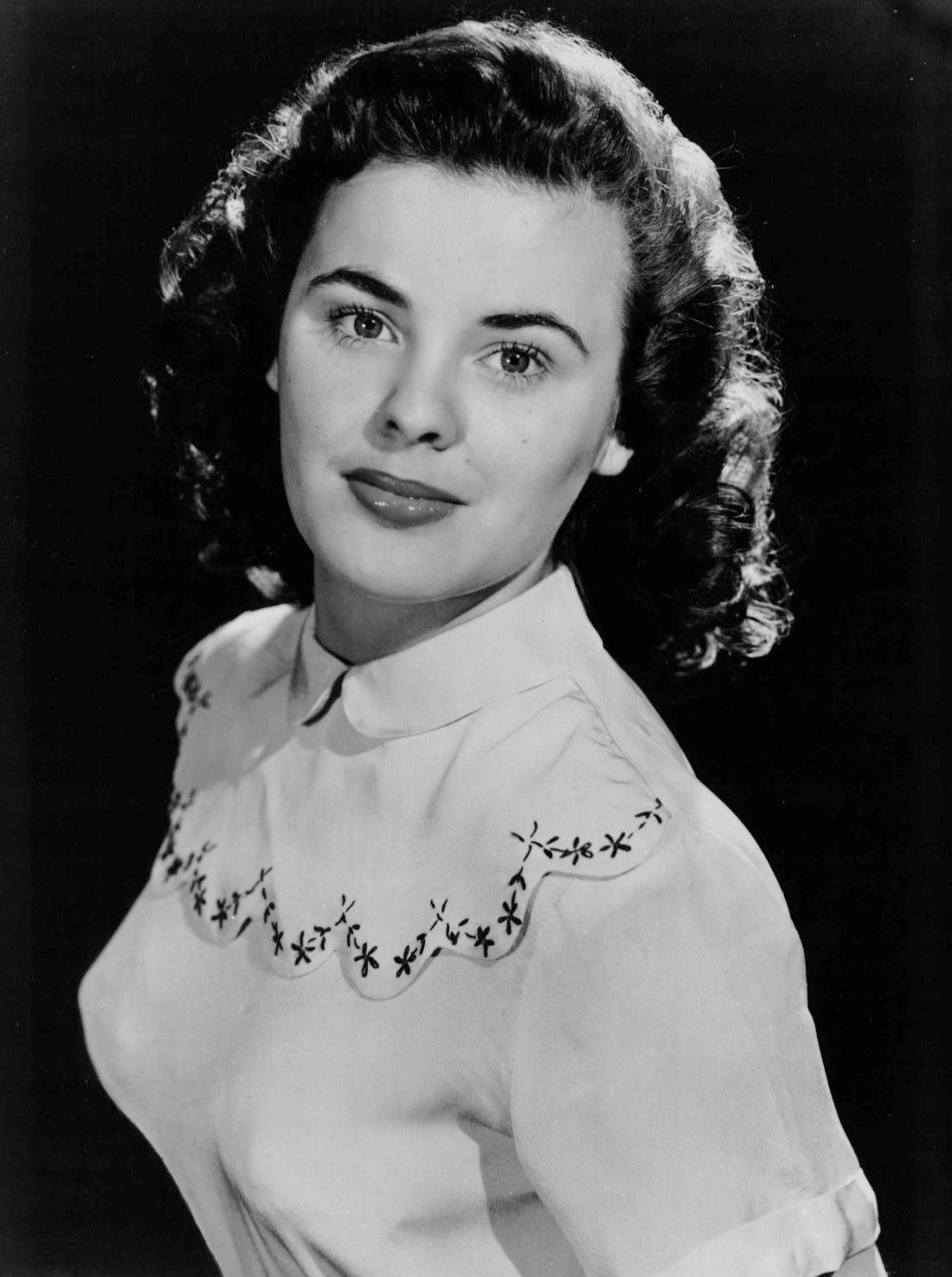
Crowley in 1958

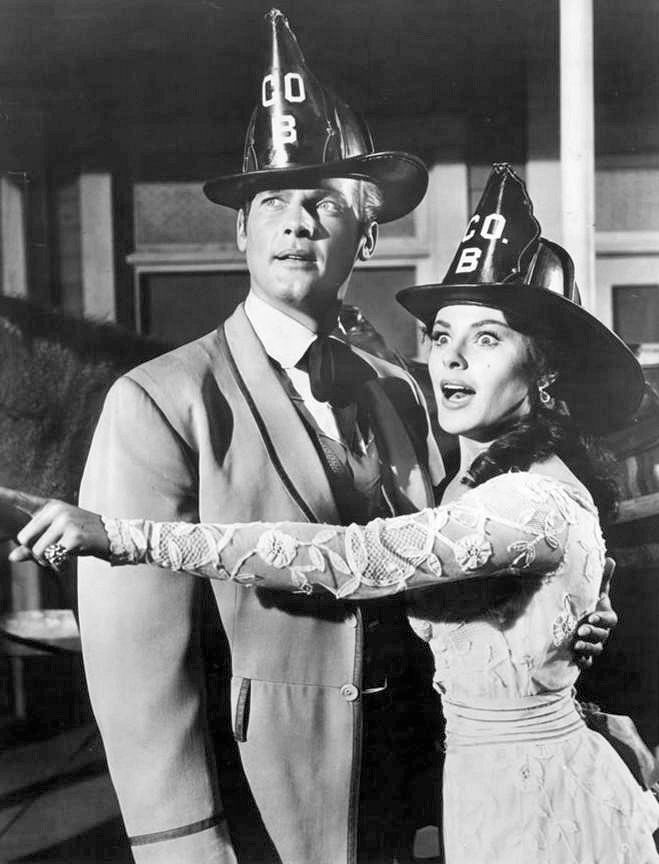
With Roger Moore in Maverick

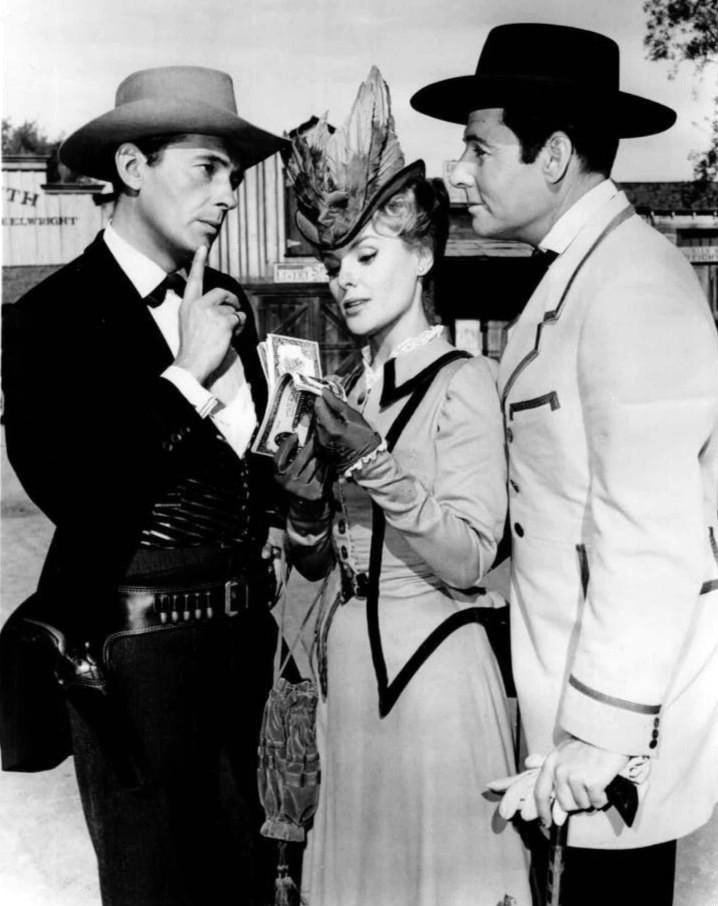
With Jack Kelly and Mike Road in Maverick

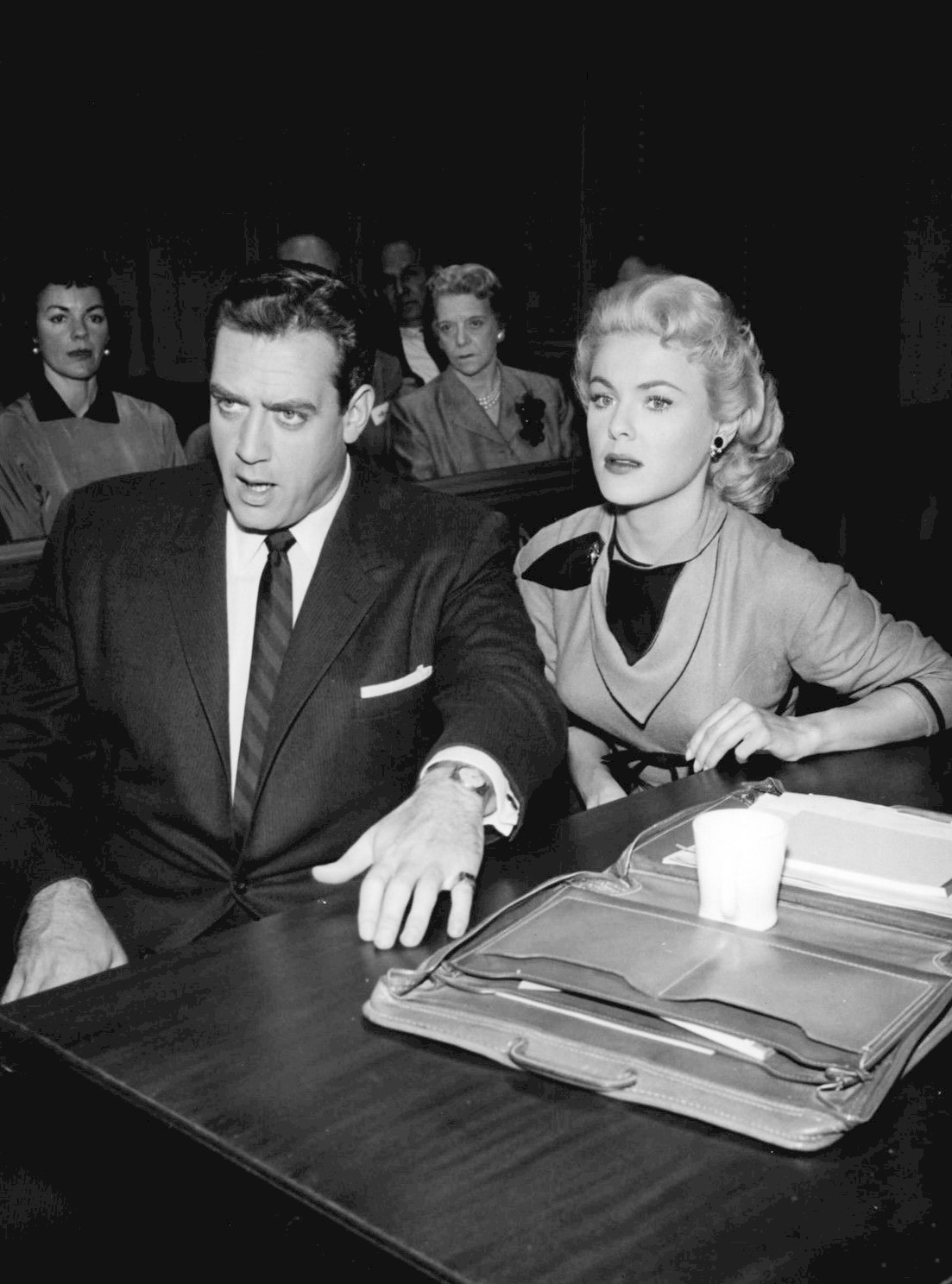
With Raymond Burr in Perry Mason

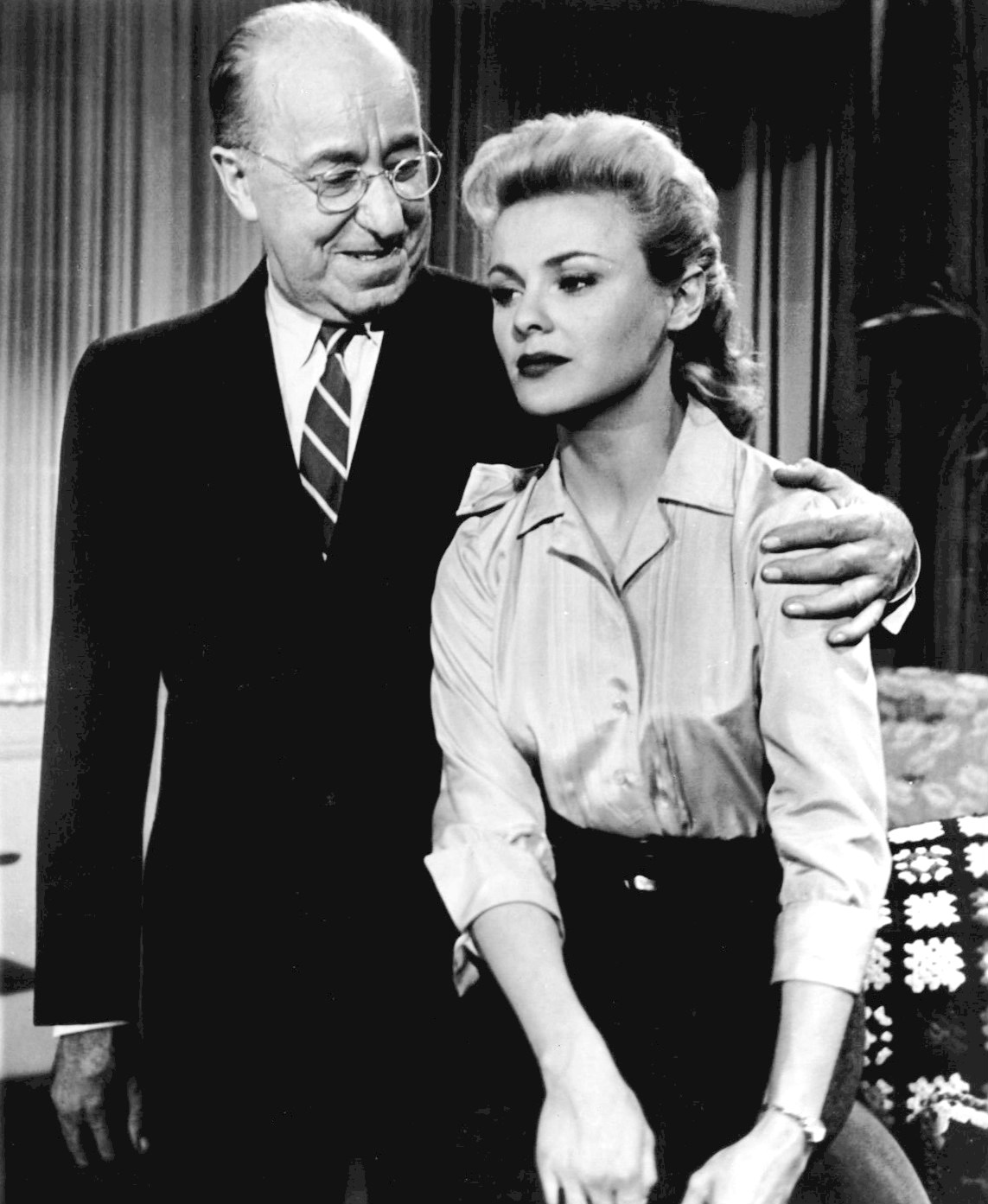
With Ed Wynn in "The Great American Hoax" on The 20th Century Fox Hour

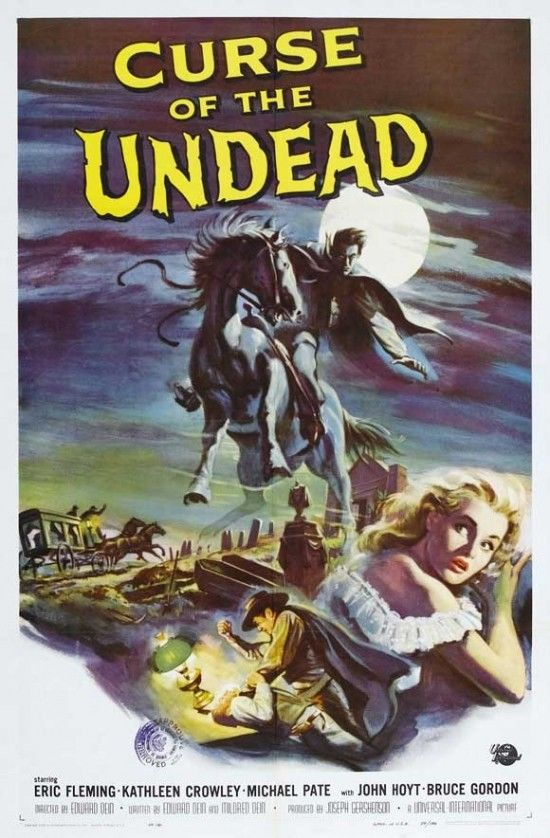
Poster with Eric Fleming on horseback and Kathleen Crowley in lower right corner

Kathleen Crowley (born Betty Jane Crowley; December 26, 1929 – April 23, 2017) was an American actress. She appeared in over 100 movies and television series in the 1950s and 1960s, almost always as a leading lady.

== Biography ==
=== Early life ===
Born on December 26, 1929, in the Green Bank section of Washington Township, New Jersey, Crowley graduated from Egg Harbor City High School in 1946. On August 7, 1949, the 19-year-old Crowley won the title of Miss New Jersey at a contest held at Asbury Park, New Jersey. As the winner, she entered the Miss America pageant held in Atlantic City, New Jersey on September 10, 1949, and finished in seventh place. At the time, she was working as a bookkeeper.

=== Acting career ===
Crowley attended New York's American Academy of Dramatic Arts in 1950 on a scholarship won at the Miss America pageant, and undertook some live TV work there.

In February 1951, she appeared with Conrad Nagel in A Star Is Born on Robert Montgomery Presents. Crowley made 81 television appearances and was cast in 20 movies between 1951 and 1970. One of her last movie roles was in Downhill Racer with Robert Redford. She made three guest appearances on Perry Mason, including the role of defendant and title character Marylin Clark in the 1958 episode "The Case of the Lonely Heiress." She was in the 1963 episode of Perry Mason's "The Case of the Drowsy Mosquito" as Mrs. Bradisson.

Her most frequent recurring appearance was as Terry Van Buren in seventeen episodes of Waterfront. She also appeared in seven episodes of the popular TV Series 77 Sunset Strip (1958-1964) beginning with that series' episode titled "Lovely Lady Pity Me," based on a novel by series creator Roy Huggins. In the episode "Strange Bedfellows," she appeared as Martizza Vedar, a character purposely similar to Zsa Zsa Gabor due to their extremely close physical resemblance. For the episode "The Desert Spa Caper," Crowley portrayed alcoholic actress Claire Dickens. In 1966 Crowley portrayed Sophia Starr on two episodes of the TV series Batman, entitled "The Penguin Goes Straight" and "Not Yet He Aint."

Many of her films were science fiction and horror movies, but she appeared in a wide range of narrative television series produced from the mid-1950s to the late 1960s including Crossroads, Yancy Derringer with Jock Mahoney, Bourbon Street Beat with Andrew Duggan, Surfside 6 with Troy Donahue, Hawaiian Eye with Connie Stevens, 77 Sunset Strip with Efrem Zimbalist Jr., Bat Masterson with Gene Barry, Cheyenne with Clint Walker, an anthology series Fireside Theater, another anthology series The Americans, Bonanza in the first season chapter 28, Colt .45, Bronco with Ty Hardin, Branded with Chuck Connors, Climax!, My Three Sons with Fred MacMurray, The Donna Reed Show, Checkmate with Sebastian Cabot and Doug McClure, Route 66, Thriller with Boris Karloff, Batman with Adam West, Disneyland, Family Affair with Brian Keith, Rawhide with Clint Eastwood, The Virginian with Doug McClure, The High Chaparral, The Restless Gun with John Payne, Tales of Wells Fargo with Dale Robertson, The Lone Ranger, and The Adventures of Champion. In 1960, Crowley appeared as Laurie Allen on the TV Western Laramie in the episode titled "Street of Hate."

Crowley is best remembered for appearing in eight episodes, a series record for leading ladies, as a variety of seductive sirens on the series Maverick (1957-1962). She was the only actress in the series whom James Garner lauded for her acting ability in depth and at length in his memoir The Garner Files. Her Maverick episodes were "The Jeweled Gun" with Jack Kelly, "Maverick Springs" with James Garner and Jack Kelly, "The Misfortune Teller" with James Garner, "A Bullet for the Teacher" and "Kiz" with Roger Moore, and three more with Jack Kelly titled "Dade City Dodge," "The Troubled Heir," and "One of Our Trains is Missing."

=== Private life ===
Crowley married John Rubsam in Los Angeles on September 27, 1969, and gave birth to her only child, a son named Matthew, the following year.

=== Death ===
She died at age 87 on April 23, 2017, at her home in Green Bank, New Jersey.

== Filmography ==
=== Film ===
Year	Title	Role	Notes
1953	The Silver Whip	Kathy Riley	
1953	The Farmer Takes a Wife	Susanna	
1953	Sabre Jet	Susan Crenshaw	
1954	Target Earth	Nora King	
1955	Female Jungle	Peggy Voe	
1955	Ten Wanted Men	Marva Gibbons	Uncredited
1955	City of Shadows	Fern Fellows	
1955	Seven Cities of Gold	Mother	Uncredited
1956	Westward Ho the Wagons!	Laura Thompson	
1957	The Quiet Gun	Teresa Carpenter	
1957	The Phantom Stagecoach	Fran Maroon	
1958	The Flame Barrier	Carol Dahlmann	
1959	Curse of the Undead	Dolores Carter	
1959	The Rebel Set	Jeanne Mapes	
1963	Showdown	Estelle	
1969	Downhill Racer	Reporter	
1970	The Lawyer	Alice Fiske	

=== Television ===
Year	Title	Role	Notes
1951	Robert Montgomery Presents	Esther Blodgett	Season 2 Episode 12: "A Star Is Born"
1951	Kraft Television Theatre	Jane Eyre	Season 4 Episode 23: "Jane Eyre"
1951	Starlight Theatre	Louise	Season 2 Episode 9: "Miss Buell"
1951	Armstrong Circle Theatre		Season 1 Episode 42: "The Hero"
1952	Crown Theatre with Gloria Swanson		Episode: "Mr. Influence"
1953	Chevron Theatre		2 episodes
1954	The Lone Wolf	Niki Armon	Season 1 Episode 25: "The Last Ballet Story"
1954	Cavalcade of America	Abigail Paddock	Season 3 Episode 3: "The Forge"
1954	Public Defender	Sharon Ferrari	Season 2 Episode 11: "Until Proven Guilty"
1954	Big Town		Season 5 Episode 10: "Bubonic Plague"
1954	The Lone Ranger	Cindy Powers	Season 4 Episode 15: "Homer with a High Hat"
1954	City Detective	Janet	Season 1 Episode 23: "Crazy Like a Fox"
1954	Mayor of the Town	Helen	Season 1 Episode 3: "Take Me Out to the Ballgame"
1954–1955	Fireside Theatre	Peggy	4 episodes
1954–1955	Waterfront	Terry Van Buren	17 episodes (Recurring role)
1955	Studio 57	Clara	Season 1 Episode 20: "The Westerner"
1955	General Electric Theater	Mary	Season 4 Episode 7: "Farewell to Kennedy"
1955–1956	Schlitz Playhouse of Stars	Peggy Prentiss	2 episodes
1955–1957	Climax!	Laura Harriss / Louise / Sally / Jeanne Warren	4 episodes
1956	Star Stage		Season 1 Episode 21: "Screen Credit"
1956	The Star and the Story		Season 2 Episode 14: "Appearances and Reality"
1956	The Adventures of Champion	Ellie Powell	Season 1 Episode 25: "The Die-Hards"
1956	Tales of the 77th Bengal Lancers		Season 1 Episode 3: "The Hostage"
1956	The Wonderful World of Disney	Laura Thompson	Season 3 Episode 10: "Along the Oregon Trail"
1956–1958	Matinee Theater	Linda Stone	3 episodes
1957	The 20th Century Fox Hour	Alice	Season 2 Episode 17: "The Great American Hoax"
1957	Crossroads	Terry	Season 2 Episode 35: "Coney Island Wedding"
1957	On Trial	Felicity O'Brien	Season 1 Episode 30: "The Case of the Girl on the Elsewhere"
1957	Lux Video Theatre	Dot	Season 7 Episode 38: "Edge of Doubt"
1957	Cheyenne	Marilee Curtis	Season 3 Episode 6: "Town of Fear"
1957–1962	Maverick	Daisy Harris (aka Daisy Haskell) / Melanie Blake / Flo Baker / Keziah 'Kiz' Bouchet / Marla / Modesty Blaine	8 episodes
1958	Colt .45	Elena Duncan	Season 1 Episode 16: "Decoy"
1958	Wagon Train	Ann Jamison	Season 1 Episode 23: "The Mark Hanford Story"
1958	The Restless Gun	Mary Blackwell	Season 1 Episode 24: "Woman from Sacramento"
1958	Tombstone Territory	Wyn Simmons	Season 1 Episode 23: "Guilt of a Town"
1958	Suspicion	Lurene Guthrie	Season 1 Episode 37: "Eye for an Eye"
1958	The Rough Riders	Tess Pearce	Season 1 Episode 7: "Blood Feud"
1958	Lux Playhouse	Anna	Season 1 Episode 5: "Coney Island Winter"
1958	Yancy Derringer	Desiree	Season 1 Episode 11: "Marble Fingers"
1958	Cimarron City	Claire Norris	Season 1 Episode 12: "McGowan's Debt"
1958–1961	77 Sunset Strip	Ann / Carol Miller / Vetta Nygood / Abigail Allen / Maritza Vedar / Claire Dickens / Melody (voice, uncredited)	7 episodes
1958–1962	Bronco	Redemption McNally / Belle Siddons	2 episodes
1958–1966	Perry Mason	Marylin Clark / Lillian Bradisson / Grace Knapp	3 episodes
1959	Rawhide	Millie Wade	Season 1 Episode 18: "Incident Below the Brazos"
1959	Markham	Ellen Childs	Season 1 Episode 11: "Forty-Two on a Rope"
1959	Death Valley Days	Elizabeth Hayward	Season 8 Episode 38: "Somewhere in the Vultures"
1959	Bourbon Street Beat	Adele Deckbar	Season 1 Episode 8: "Invitation to a Murder"
1959–1960	Bat Masterson	Jo Hart / Mari Brewster	2 episodes
1959–1962	Tales of Wells Fargo	Gilda / Royal Maroon	2 episodes
1960	Laramie	Laurie Allen	Season 1 Episode 24: "Street of Hate"
1960	The Deputy	Martha Jackson	Season 2 Episode 4: "The Fatal Urge"
1960–1961	Hawaiian Eye	May Caldwell / Julia Abbott	2 episodes
1960–1968	Bonanza	Kathleen aka Quick-Buck Kate / Laurie Hayden / Mademoiselle Denise	3 episodes
1961	The Americans	Lucy Vickery	Season 1 Episode 3: "The Regular"
1961	Thriller	Dr. Lois Walker	Season 1 Episode 24: "The Ordeal of Dr. Cordell"
1961	Affairs of Anatol	Ilona	TV Movie
1961	Surfside 6	Lady Kay Smallens / Dr. Leslie Halliday	2 episodes
1962	Checkmate	Pauline Spencer	Season 2 Episode 30: "Rendezvous in Washington"
1962	FBI Code 98	Marian Nichols	TV Movie
1963	Route 66	Diana Kirk	Season 3 Episode 20: "...Shall Forfeit His Dog and Ten Shillings to the King"
1963	Redigo	Laura	Season 1 Episode 10: "Shadow of the Cougar"
1964	The Donna Reed Show	Nancy Patterson	Season 6 Episode 29: "Love Letters Are for Burning"
1964	My Three Sons	Lois Wilson	Season 5 Episode 1: "Caribbean Cruise"
1964	The Farmer's Daughter	Grace	Season 2 Episode 14: "The Helping Hand"
1965	The Virginian	Jennifer McLeod	Season 3 Episode 27: "Farewell to Honesty"
1965	The Bravo Duke	Mrs. Ortegas	TV Movie
1965	Branded	Laura Rock	Season 2 Episode 1: "Judge Not"
1966	Gidget	Barbara	Season 1 Episode 22: "We Got Each Other"
1966	Batman	Sophia Starr	2 episodes
1966–1969	Family Affair	Nedra Wolcott / Lois Mason	2 episodes
1969	The High Chaparral	Countess Maria Kettenden von München	Season 2 Episode 20: "Once on a Day in Spring"
