= Darlene Gillespie =

American actress and singer

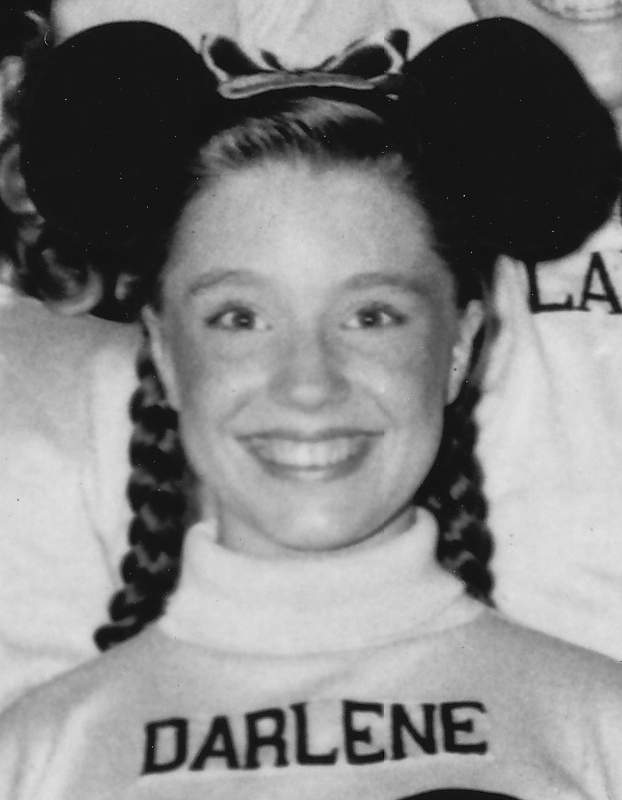
- Darlene Gillespie as a Mousketeer on The Mickey Mouse Club, c. 1956
- Born: Montreal, Quebec, Canada
- Other name: Darlene Valentine
- Occupations: Actress; singer; dancer
- Years active: 1955–1962
- Spouse: Jerry Fraschilla (m. 1999; died 2008)
- Relatives: Gina Gillespie (sister)

Darlene Gillespie (born April 8, 1941) is a Canadian-American former child actress, most remembered as a singer and dancer on the original The Mickey Mouse Club television series from 1955 to 1959. After her career in entertainment ended, she became a nurse.

== Early life ==
Gillespie was born on April 8, 1941 in Montreal, Quebec, Canada. Her Irish father and French Canadian mother were a former vaudeville dance team. When Gillespie was less than a year old, her family moved to Los Angeles, California. Gillespie has three sisters. Her younger sister Gina Gillespie was a child actress in television and film who eventually became a lawyer.

At age ten, Gillespie started singing lessons with Glen Raikes, and took dance lessons with Burch Mann, founder of the American Folk Ballet Company. She became a naturalized U.S. citizen in September 1956, at the age of fifteen.

== Career ==
=== 1955–1958: The Mickey Mouse Club ===
Gillespie auditioned for The Mickey Mouse Club in March 1955. She originally auditioned as a dancer, but she sang "The Ballad of Davy Crockett" and was hired. She was the leading female singer of the Mouseketeers (opposite the leading male singer Tommy Cole), and appeared on the program for all three seasons of its original run.

As a Mouseketeer, Gillespie was described as being "a vibrant, freckle-faced youngster with more bounce to the ounce than a bottle of soda pop". She was known for her singing talents, dancing, comedy sketches, and her country-inspired singing performances.

In the first season, she starred in the serial Corky and White Shadow (1956) with Buddy Ebsen and Lloyd Corrigan. The 17-episode serial introduced Gillespie as the female teenage heroine Corky Brady, accompanied by a white German Shepherd. A number of songs were incorporated into the plot to showcase young Gillespie's singing talents, most notably "My Pa" and "Uncle Dan".

The second season opened with The Amusement Park showpiece, featuring Gillespie and Bobby Burgess. It was considered a surprise for touching on teen romance and even more so for celebrating a non-Disney amusement park. During the second season of the show, Gillespie shared a Talent Round-Up Day with her three sisters, and was also given her own special feature in the Fun With Music Day episodes Day's End and An Evening with Darlene. However throughout the second season, Mouseketeer Annette Funicello was becoming a rising star, promoted by Walt Disney himself, which shifted the viewer's attention from Gillespie to Funicello by 1958.

The third season opened with The Pet Shop showpiece, featuring Gillespie with Lonnie Burr, Bobby Burgess, and Tommy Cole. In the Fun With Music Day episode Blind Date, Gillespie stars in a comedic role as a geeky teenager waiting for her date. During the third season, Gillespie appeared in the serial The New Adventures of Spin and Marty (1957) with Tim Considine and David Stollery, and was cast in a secondary role as Annette's friend.

Gillespie was cast as Dorothy Gale in a musical number from the proposed live-action Disney film The Rainbow Road to Oz on an episode of the Disneyland television series in September 1957; however, the movie was never made. The serial Annette (1958), starring Funicello, was originally titled Annette and Darlene and co-starred Gillespie. For reasons unknown, the serial was retitled, and Gillespie was replaced by Judy Nugent as Annette's friend Jet.

After The Mickey Mouse Club stopped filming in 1959, and her contract with Disney was not renewed, Gillespie's acting career, which was rumored to have been sabotaged at Disney by Gillespie and her father, neared its end. Her last television appearance was as Beth Brian in the 1962 episode "The Star" of the NBC family drama series National Velvet starring Lori Martin as a budding thoroughbred rider.

=== Music career ===
Gillespie made many recordings under various Disney labels, including an album of 1950s rock and roll standards, Darlene of the Teens (1957). For the album, she recorded songs with The Mellomen such as "Teenage Crush", "Don't Forbid Me", "Butterfly", "Too Much" and "Sittin' in the Balcony". She also did a noteworthy rendition of Elvis' "Love Me Tender".

In 1956, Gillespie and Tommy Cole, the two leading singers of The Mickey Mouse Club, released a single "I Am Not Now and Never Have Been in Love" and "Do Mi So".

Gillespie recorded albums for Disney animated films, in which she sang and narrated stories such as Alice in Wonderland, Cinderella, and Sleeping Beauty. Many of Gillespie's recordings sold for decades, a testimony to her remarkable singing voice and talents. She also sang the songs "Valentine Greetings" and "My Pa", a song that she sang in Corky and White Shadow, from the album "Happy Birthday and Other Holiday Songs".

In 1973, in an attempt to revive her singing career, Gillespie formed her own record company Alva Records. She released two 45s of country songs under the name Darlene Valentine.

=== Legal battle ===
In the late 1980s, Gillespie began a legal battle against Disney and the Screen Actors Guild for royalties and residual payments for record sales and reruns of The Mickey Mouse Club. Gillespie had previously sustained a back injury from a fall that ended her medical career as a nurse. This legal battle strained her relationship with her former Mouseketeers castmates.

She was banned from participating in the 40th anniversary Mickey Mouse Club documentary because of her criticisms of Disney and Funicello.

== Personal life ==
Following The Mickey Mouse Club, Gillespie finished high school at Providence High in Burbank. She later graduated from University with a nursing degree, specializing in heart surgery. She devoted her adult life in the medical field as a nurse.

Gillespie has two children, David and Lisa. She has been married four times.

== Arrests ==
In 1997, she was charged with petty theft for helping her then-fiancé Jerry Fraschilla shoplift four women's shirts. She was found guilty and sentenced to three days in jail and three years' probation. Gillespie, then 56 years old, denied the charges and filed preliminary papers to appeal. The disposition is unclear.

In December 1998, she was convicted in federal court of aiding her, by then, third husband, Fraschilla, to purchase securities using a check-kiting scheme. She was sentenced to two years in prison, but was released after serving only three months.

In 2005, she and her husband were indicted on federal charges of filing multiple fraudulent claims in the settlement of a class-action lawsuit. The charges were subsequently dropped. Fraschilla died in 2008.

== Discography ==
=== Disney ===
- Walt Disney's Corky and White Shadow (Official Mickey Mouse Club, 1955)
- Mouskemusicals (Official Mickey Mouse Club, 1956)
- I Am Not Now and Never Have Been in Love / Do Mi So (1956)
- Four Songs From Walt Disney's Cinderella (Official Mickey Mouse Club, 1957)
- Walt Disney's Perri (Official Mickey Mouse Club, 1957)
- Walt Disney's Alice In Wonderland (Disneyland, 1957)
- Darlene Of The Teens (Disneyland, 1957)
- Four Songs From Walt Disney's Snow White And The Seven Dwarfs (Official Mickey Mouse Club, 1958)
- Songs From Walt Disney's Sleeping Beauty (Official Mickey Mouse Club, 1959)
- Walt Disney's Most Beloved Songs From His Great Motion Pictures (Disneyland, 1964)

=== Solo ===
- I Loved, I Laughed, I Cried / Ring The Bell, Beat The Drum (Coral, 1960)
- April Is The Month Of Loving / Grass Grows Round My Feet (Alva, 1973) - "Darlene Valentine"
- Touch And Go / Both Feet On The Ground (Alva, 1974) - "Darlene Valentine"
