= Dennis Day (Mouseketeer) =

American actor and director (1942–2018)

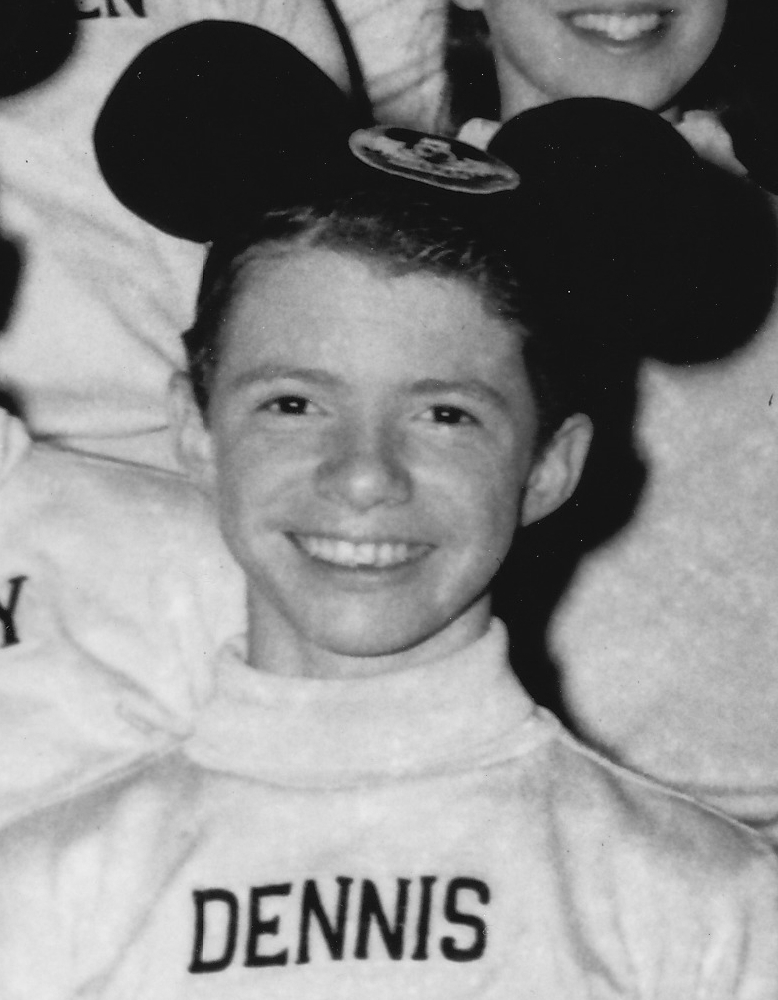
- Dennis Day as a Mouseketeer on The Mickey Mouse Club, in 1956
- Born: Dennis W. Day; July 12, 1942; Las Vegas, Nevada, U.S.
- Disappeared: July 17, 2018 (aged 76); Phoenix, Oregon, U.S.
- Status: Remains found
- Body discovered: April 7, 2019; Jackson County, Oregon, U.S.
- Occupations: Actor; singer; dancer; theater director
- Years active: 1948–1980s
- Spouse: Henry Ernest Caswell (m. 2009)

Dennis W. Day (July 12, 1942 – c. July 17, 2018) was an American actor, singer, dancer, and theater director, best known as one of the original cast members of The Mickey Mouse Club. After ending his career as a child actor, he went on to work as a theater director before relocating to Oregon in the 1980s.

Day disappeared in July 2018, and was found dead several months later. A roommate was charged with his death in 2019.

== Life and career ==
=== Early life ===
Day was born in Las Vegas, Nevada, and later moved to Downey, California. He started acting at age six and after auditioning with his sister, was a Mouseketeer for the first two seasons of The Mickey Mouse Club in 1955–1957. At age 11, he appeared in a minor uncredited role in the film A Lion Is in the Streets (1953) with James Cagney.

He came out as gay to his family and moved to San Francisco when he turned 18, though he later told a Rolling Stone interviewer in 1971 that he was bisexual and had used drugs. He continued to work as an actor and dancer, including at La MaMa Theatre in New York and in Los Angeles.

=== Later life ===
Day married Henry Ernest Caswell, his partner since the early 1970s, in 2009. Day and Caswell at one time ran a guesthouse for gay actors in San Francisco; from the 1960s until the early 1980s, Day worked for the Living History Centre, producing Renaissance and Dickens Christmas fairs, playing Newington Butts at the Renaissance fairs and also coaching other actors. They moved in the mid-1980s to Oregon, first settling in Ashland and then in Phoenix, where they had a house. Caswell also worked for the Oregon Shakespeare Festival, while Day made and sold wine jelly and worked seasonally for Harry & David.

== Disappearance and death ==
Day was reportedly last seen on July 17, 2018 when Caswell, who has dementia, had been admitted to hospital after a fall. Day reportedly left on foot, telling a third housemate, a live-in handyman, that he was going to visit friends, but his cat and dog were left behind, and the dog was found roaming by neighbors. One neighbor had a letter written by Day mentioning being assaulted by the handyman, who told police that Day was also exhibiting signs of mental problems. After Day was reported missing, his car was found in the possession of people about 200 miles (320 km) away in Coos County, who according to police said that they had permission to take it, possibly in exchange for helping the handyman. In August 2018, police searched the property after neighbors complained of a "bad smell". Friends began asking for help to locate Day starting in November that year, and in February 2019, after his family learned of his disappearance, his case was featured on an episode of Dateline NBC. In March 2019, his case was profiled on the podcast The Vanished.

Phoenix police had searched Day's residence and elsewhere, but in early April 2019, human remains were discovered on the property by the Oregon State Police, who had taken over the case. The remains were reportedly under a pile of clothes. On June 6, 2019, the remains were confirmed as those of Day, though a cause of death was not announced. On July 5, 2019, Oregon State Police arrested the former handyman. The man, 36-year-old Daniel James Burda, was charged with several crimes in connection with Day's death, including manslaughter, criminally negligent homicide, and identity theft. After delays caused by some of the evidence being ruled inadmissible, in February 2023 a date of January 22, 2024, was set for Burda's trial in the case. Burda later pled guilty, and was sentenced to four years in prison.

== Filmography ==
Year	Title	Role	Notes	Ref.
1953	A Lion Is in the Streets		Uncredited walk-on role	
1955–1957	The Mickey Mouse Club	Himself	Main cast member	

== See also ==
- List of solved missing person cases (post-2000)
