= Westward Ho the Wagons! =

1956 film by William Beaudine

- Theatrical release poster
- Directed by: William Beaudine
- Screenplay by: Tom Blackburn
- Based on: Children of the Covered Wagon by Mary Jane Carr
- Produced by: Bill Walsh
- Starring: Fess Parker; Kathleen Crowley; Jeff York; Sebastian Cabot; George Reeves; David Stollery
- Cinematography: Charles P. Boyle, A.S.C.
- Edited by: Cotton Warburton, A.C.E.
- Music by: George Bruns
- Production company: Walt Disney Productions
- Distributed by: Buena Vista Distribution
- Release date: December 20, 1956
- Running time: 90 minutes
- Country: United States
- Language: English
- Box office: $2.75 million (US)

Westward Ho the Wagons! is a 1956 American Western film starring Fess Parker and Kathleen Crowley and produced by Walt Disney Productions. Based on Mary Jane Carr's novel Children of the Covered Wagon, the film was produced by Bill Walsh, directed by William Beaudine, and released to theatres on December 20, 1956 by Buena Vista Distribution Company. The supporting cast features Mouseketeer Cubby O'Brien, Jeff York, Sebastian Cabot (in his first film role for Disney), David Stollery, and George Reeves (his final feature film appearance).

== Plot ==
A small group of families join together to travel to Oregon in 1846. Their leader is ostensibly James Stephen (George Reeves), who has made the trip before, and is now bringing his family along. John Grayson (Fess Parker), known as Doc for his ambition to study medicine, proves to be the real leader of the wagon train.

The pioneers deal with the elements and occasional raids, but after hostile Pawnees drive off their spare horses, they realize they may not make it to the Oregon Territory. While stopping at Fort Laramie, the pioneer children make friends with Sioux children. After the Sioux chief's son is injured in an accident, Doc Grayson helps heal him, earning the trust of the Sioux. As the story ends, the Sioux warriors escort the wagon train safely through Pawnee territory.

== Cast ==
- Fess Parker as John 'Doc' Grayson
- Kathleen Crowley as Laura Thompson
- Jeff York as Hank Breckenridge
- David Stollery as Dan Thompson
- Sebastian Cabot as Bissonette
- George Reeves as James Stephen
- Doreen Tracey as Bobo Stephen
- Morgan Woodward as Obie Foster
- Barbara Woodell as Mrs. Stephen
- Iron Eyes Cody as Many Stars
- John War Eagle as Wolf's Brother
- Anthony Numkena as Little Thunder
- Cubby O'Brien as Jerry Stephen
- Karen Pendleton as Myra Thompson
- Tommy Cole as Jim Stephen
- Jane Liddell as Ruth Benjamin
- Leslie Bradley as Spencer Armitage
- Jon Locke as Ed Benjamin

Additionally, several actors appear in the film uncredited. They include: Max Wagner as a Wagon man; Chuck Courtney as a Wagon man, Gertrude Astor as a Wagon woman, Eddie Little Sky as a Pawnee Indian, and Carl Mathews as an Indian.

== Songs ==
- Westward Ho the Wagons! - lyrics by Tom Blackburn and music by George Bruns
- The Ballad of John Colter - lyrics by Tom Blackburn and music by George Bruns
- Wringle Wrangle - written by Stan Jones
- "I'm Lonely, My Darlin'" (based on Green Grow the Lilacs, traditional) - lyrics by Fess Parker and music arrangement by George Bruns
- Pioneer's Prayer (from The Vanishing Prairie) - lyrics by Hazel "Gil" George and music by Paul Smith

== Production ==
Fess Parker stars in the film, which also features the last big-screen appearance of George Reeves. It was released on videotape in 1986 and on March 18, 1997. The film was shot in Janss Conejo Ranch, now known as Wildwood Regional Park in Thousand Oaks, California. Four Mousketeers from the "Mickey Mouse Club" were in the film: Tommy Cole, Doreen Tracey, Cubby O'Brien, and Karen Pendleton.

The film was only a moderate success, and received mixed reviews. Fess Parker's version of the song "Wringle Wrangle" from the film was released as a single.

== Reception ==
Variety noted: "Cinemascope treatment allows a vast panorama against which to limn the simple, yet stirring, narrative, and there's the marquee lure of Fess Parker for the younger trade particularly." Harrison's Reports wrote: "Set against highly impressive outdoor backgrounds and beautifully photographed in CinemaScope and Technicolor, this Walt Disney live-action western should go over well with the family trade, particularly the youngsters, for children play an important part in the proceedings." The Monthly Film Bulletin wrote: "Walt Disney's latest western adventure contains neither the excitement, the good humour nor the high spirits of his Davy Crockett films. There is a sense of strain; the humour hangs heavy; the action and its outcome is always predictable. The undaunted Fess Parker, however, remains as resolute as ever, and sings with the same charm and style."

== See also ==
- List of American films of 1956
