= Nancy Abbate Caldwell =

American actress

Nancy Abbate Caldwell (born June 19, 1942) is an American former actress and dancer who was a Mousketeer on the first season of The Mickey Mouse Club. She left entertaining to become a dance teacher.

== Early years ==
Caldwell was born Nancy Lee Abbate in Los Angeles. When she was 7 years old, she began taking dancing lessons. She progressed from a local dance instructor to studying with Louis Dupron, a dance director for a Hollywood studio. Dupron later arranged an audition for Caldwell for a part in the film Love Is Better Than Ever, and she got the role.

== Career ==
=== Entertaining ===
In 1954, Caldwell was picked to be a Mousketeer for the first season of The Mickey Mouse Club. She left after that first year, partly because of rivalries and jealousy among the Mousketeers and partly because she wanted to do other work. Soon after she left, she had an uncredited role in the Dean Martin and Jerry Lewis film Artists and Models (1955). She also appeared in the films The Farmer Takes a Wife and Courage of Black Beauty. She was a member of the cast of the pilot episode of The Ray Bolger Show on television, but her part and others were recast for the regular series.

Following her husband's death when she was 16, Caldwell worked in nightclubs and made some TV commercials, then moved with her baby to Las Vegas, where she worked as a cocktail waitress and danced in casinos and clubs, saving money in hopes of opening a dance studio.

=== Teaching ===
After having a successful dance studio in Las Vegas, Caldwell moved to Vista, California, and opened Nancy's Dance Studio in 1982. Its success led her to open another studio with the same name in Temecula, California, in the early 1990s.

== Personal life ==
Caldwell married when she was 16 years old. Three months after the wedding, she was six weeks pregnant when her husband died in a train crash.
