= Bonnie Lynn Fields =

American actress

- Born: Bonita Lynn Fields; July 18, 1944; Walterboro, South Carolina, U.S.
- Died: November 17, 2012 (aged 68); Richmond, Indiana, U.S.
- Occupation: Actress
- Years active: 1957–1971

Bonnie Lynn Fields (July 18, 1944 – November 17, 2012) was an American actress and Mouseketeer on The Mickey Mouse Club, beginning with the show's third season. Her film credits included roles in Angel in My Pocket, Bye Bye Birdie, and Funny Girl.

Fields was born Bonita Fields in Walterboro, South Carolina. Fields was just 12 years old when she was cast as a Mouseketeer, joining The Mickey Mouse Club at the start of its third season (1957-1958). Approximately 5,000 children auditioned to join the show for its third season; Fields was the second to the last person to audition for the show. Walt Disney reportedly personally asked Fields to change her name from "Bonita," which had three syllables, to a new two-syllable stage name ("Bonnie") to harmonize more effectively with the show's other Mouseketeers during musical songs.

In the 1960s, Fields appeared on Broadway, including Half a Sixpence and Kelly. She appeared in the 25th anniversary show about the Mickey Mouse Club in 1980.

Fields died from throat cancer in Richmond, Indiana, on November 17, 2012, aged 68.
