= The Farmer Takes a Wife (1953 film) =

1953 film by Henry Levin

- Directed by: Henry Levin
- Written by: Walter Bullock; Sally Benson; Joseph Fields
- Based on: The Farmer Takes a Wife; 1934 play by Frank B. Elser; Rome Haul; 1929 novel by Walter D. Edmonds
- Produced by: Frank P. Rosenberg
- Starring: Betty Grable; Dale Robertson; Thelma Ritter
- Cinematography: Arthur E. Arling
- Edited by: Louis R. Loeffler
- Music by: Harold Arlen; Dorothy Fields; Orch./Arr. Cyril J. Mockridge
- Production company: 20th Century Fox
- Distributed by: 20th Century Fox
- Release date: June 12, 1953
- Running time: 81 minutes
- Country: United States
- Language: English
- Budget: $1,860,000
- Box office: $1,150,000 (US)

The Farmer Takes a Wife is a 1953 Technicolor musical comedy film starring Betty Grable and Dale Robertson. The picture is a remake of the 1935 film of the same name which starred Janet Gaynor and Henry Fonda. Grable and Dale Robertson first appeared together in the movie Call Me Mister (1951).

A Gable biographer called it "probably the weakest film in Grable's oeuvre, owing mostly to its mundane screenplay and turgid, uninspired, staging."

== Plot ==
In the 19th century, Molly Larkins, the girlfriend of rough-and-tumble canal-boat captain Jotham Klore, hires mild-mannered farmer Daniel Harrow to work on the boat. Molly and Dan fall in love and marry.

== Cast ==
- Betty Grable as Molly Larkins
- Dale Robertson as Dan Harrow
- Thelma Ritter as Lucy Cashdollar
- John Carroll as Jotham Klore
- Eddie Foy, Jr. as Fortune Friendly
- Charlotte Austin as Pearl Dowd
- Kathleen Crowley as Susanna
- Merry Anders as Hannah
- May Wynn as Eva Gooch
- George 'Gabby' Hayes as Uncle Ben
- Nancy Abbate as Little Girl (uncredited)
- Doreen Tracey as Little Girl (uncredited)

== Songs ==
Harold Arlen & Dorothy Fields composed the following songs for the movie:

- "Can You Spell Schenectady?"
- "The Erie Canal"
- "I Could Cook"
- "I Was Wearin' Horse Shoes"
- "Look Who's Been Dreaming"
- "On The Erie Canal"
- "Somethin' Real Special"
- "Today I Love Everybody"
- "We're Doin' It For The Natives In Jamaica"
- "We're In Business"
- "When I Close My Door"
- "With The Sun Warm Upon Me"
- "Yes!"

== Production ==
The movie was a musical remake of a 1935 film. Dorothy Field and Howard Arlen provided the score, although both felt Betty Grable as miscast as a cook on the canals. Grable had just come off suspension for refusing The Girl Next Door. During filming, Gable was told that Gentlemen Prefer Blondes, which had originally been bought for her, was going to be made with Marilyn Monroe.

Frank Sinatra was apparently wanted for the film but the studio refused his demand to pay his salary in advance.

A dream sequence was made for the movie but cut from the final film.

== Reception ==
The film was a box office disappointment making $1,220,000 in domestic film rentals, Grable's worst performing film since That Lady in Ermine. (Variety put this figure slightly lower.)

== Radio adaptation ==
The Farmer Takes a Wife was presented on Best Plays June 28, 1953. The one-hour adaptation starred John Forsythe and Joan Lorring.

== Notes ==
- Hulse, Ed (1996). The Films of Betty Grable. Riverwood Press.
