= Cubby O'Brien =

American musician

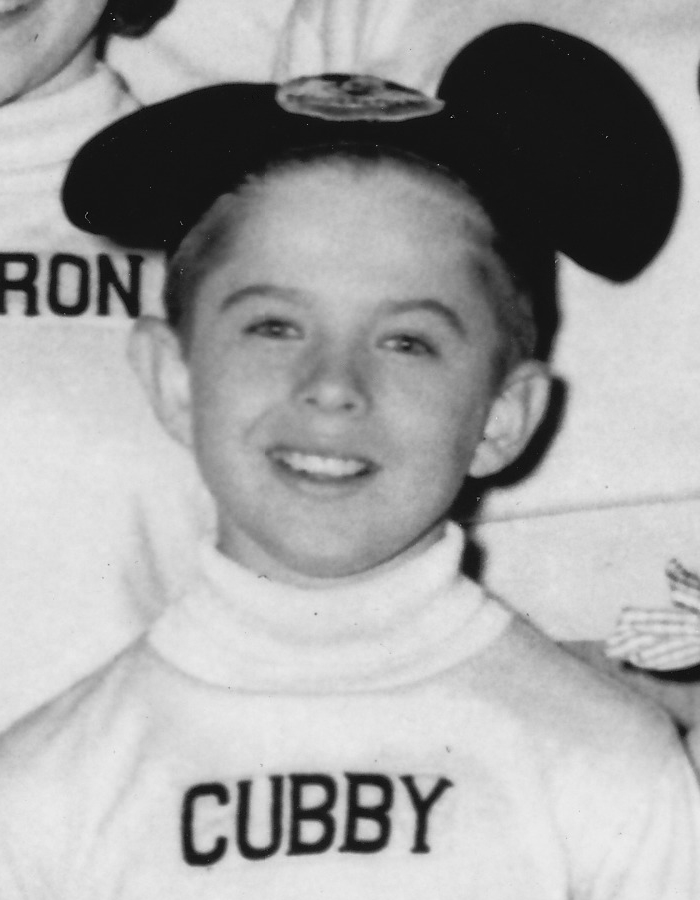
- O'Brien as a Mouseketeer on The Mickey Mouse Club, c. 1956
- Born: Carl Patrick O'Brien; July 14, 1946 (age 80); Burbank, California, U.S.
- Years active: 1953–present
- Spouse(s): Marilyn Miller (1967–1976); Terry Wilemon (1978–1999); Holly Sims (2002–present)
- Children: 1

Carl Patrick "Cubby" O'Brien (born July 14, 1946), better known by his nickname Cubby, is an American drummer and former child actor. He is known as one of the original Mouseketeers on the weekday ABC television program The Mickey Mouse Club from 1955 to 1958.

== Early life ==
O'Brien was the third son of musician Haskell "Hack" O'Brien, a well-known drummer for several big band era ensembles. When he was an infant, his mother thought he resembled a bear cub, and gave him his lifelong nickname. He has two older brothers: Haskell O'Brien, Jr., a trumpet player; and Warren O'Brien, also a drummer.

Although born in Burbank, O'Brien grew up in the Los Angeles suburb of Shadow Hills, between Sun Valley and Sunland. He began studying music at the Carl Babcock School of Music from age five, and later performed with the Roger Babcock Dixieland Band at charity events and for local television. In 1962 he graduated from Hollywood Professional School, where he was president of his class.

== Career ==
O'Brien, like Annette Funicello, was personally selected to audition for The Mickey Mouse Club by Walt Disney, in the spring of 1955. Disney was alerted to him by a staff member who caught his live performance at a charity gala.

Though he had little prior singing or dancing experience, O'Brien was placed on The Mickey Mouse Club's first-string "Red Team" right from the start. He quickly picked up enough dance skills to perform in musical numbers, though his solo performances remained centered around his drums. He remained with the show for all three seasons (1955–1958) of original programming. When filming ended, he went on live-performance tours with other Mouseketeers to Australia in 1959 and 1960.

Following Disney, he joined the Lawrence Welk organization for two years, often doing duets with Janet Lennon. He performed with the "Little Band", doing guest bits on the maestro's show, as well as other television series. After graduating from high school, he started touring with Spike Jones, playing show tunes and dance music with the formerly manic bandleader's final group. He then played for Ann-Margret in her live performances, and in the late Sixties returned to television as the sometime on-camera drummer for CBS's The Carol Burnett Show.

O'Brien was also music director for the LA touring companies of the Broadway hits Hair and Oh, Calcutta! in the early Seventies, and often fulfilled the same role for other engagements where his primary responsibility was drumming.

=== The Carpenters ===
Beginning in 1973, O'Brien joined The Carpenters as a touring drummer, due to public demand for Karen Carpenter to sing at the front instead of from behind the drum kit. Despite this scenario, Karen still played drums live during this period, although rarely and mostly on B-side songs, with Hal Blaine and other professional studio percussionists performing on the group's recordings. Sharing a love of percussion, O'Brien at one point introduced Carpenter to big band drummer Buddy Rich. His tenure with the band lasted until the 1980s.

O'Brien was a contestant on the ABC game show The Big Showdown in the mid-1970s, winning $5,000 for rolling "Show Down" during the timed dice roll round.

In 1980, O'Brien reunited with his fellow Mouseketeers for a television special, in which he sang, danced and played drums. He also joined some of these same Mouseketeers for live shows on fall weekends at Disneyland during the early 1980s.

Since the eighties, O'Brien's career has predominated around performing for Broadway productions, as well as for live shows by performers like Bernadette Peters. He was based in New York City instead of the West Coast for many years, though he has since moved back.

== Personal life ==
Cubby met his first wife, Marilyn Miller, while touring with Spike Jones. They were married around 1966, and had a daughter together before divorcing around 1976. In 1978, Cubby married Terry Wilemon, whom he met in Las Vegas while touring with the Carpenters. That too ended in divorce, in 1999. He married for the third time in 2002, to Holly Sims, a Portland-based flight attendant. Cubby lives in the Pacific Northwest and still works regularly, playing drums for various touring Broadway shows, and with Bernadette Peters. He has taken part in many of the Mouseketeer Reunion shows, including the 50th Anniversary in 2005, but usually is too busy drumming to make personal appearances. Cubby was present at Disneyland's 70th Celebration on July 17, 2025. It is unknown if he was an invited guest.

== Filmography ==
- Westward Ho, the Wagons! (1956) ... as Jerry Stephen
- Charro! (1969)

== Television credits ==
- The Spade Cooley Show: 3 episodes (1954) ....as guest drummer
- Where's Raymond?: 1 episode (1955) ....as guest drummer
- Disneyland: 3 episodes (1955–1957) ....as Mouseketeer Cubby
- The Mickey Mouse Club: series regular (1955–1958) ....as Mouseketeer Cubby
- The Lawrence Welk Show: unknown episodes (1958–1959) ....as guest drummer and singer
- Dick Powell's Zane Grey Theater: "The Man from Yesterday" (1960) ....as Ted Duncan
- The Wonderful World of Color: "The Mickey Mouse 40th Anniversary Show" (1968) ....as Mouseketeer Cubby
- The Carol Burnett Show crew (1967–1970) ....as drummer
- Tomorrow 1 episode (1975) ....as Cubby O'Brien
- The Wonderful World of Disney: "The Mouseketeer Reunion" (1980) ....as Mouseketeer Cubby
- The Mickey Mouse Club Story documentary (1995) ...as Cubby O'Brien

== Broadway credits ==
- Annie Get Your Gun (1999–2001) ...as drummer
- Gypsy (2003–2004) ...as drummer
- The Producers (2001–2003) ...as drummer

== Discography ==
With Milt Jackson

- Memphis Jackson (Impulse!, 1969)

With The Carpenters

- Live at Budokan 1974 (PolyGram Video, LaserDisc, 1996)
- Live in Japan (A&M/King, 1975)
- A Kind of Hush (A&M, 1976)
- Live at the Palladium (A&M, 1977)
- Christmas Portrait (A&M, 1978)
