= Steiner Brothers (tap-dancing trio) =

Canadian tap dance team

The Steiner Brothers were a Canadian tap-dancing trio active in North American nightclubs and theatres and in television and film during the 1950s and 1960s. The group consisted of three brothers from Winnipeg: Roy Steiner (May 20, 1941 – October 27, 2019), Ron Steiner (born 1942), and Rob Steiner (born 1944). The group also sang and performed comedy. Ron Steiner was also one of the original Mouseketeers for Walt Disney.

== Family background and education ==
The Steiner Brothers are the children of Ralph Steiner and Madge Steiner (née Hoffard). Their father was a child prodigy on the violin who had conducted the Winnipeg Symphony Orchestra at the age of 12, and later worked as the bandmaster of his own dance band. Their mother had danced professionally with the Hoffard Sisters, a Saskatchewan-based dance troupe in the 1930s and 1940s. The couple performed together until they had children, with their father sometimes assuming the persona of Howie Squeeks, a clown. The family resided in a home on Eugenie Street in Saint Boniface, Winnipeg. The brothers began dancing lessons with their parents as a way of treating Roy's slightly crippled foot, initially with no intent of pursuing a professional career in dance. The Steiner family moved to California after their mother's sister was hired as a dancer with Dean Martin and Jerry Lewis. The boys were educated at the Hollywood Professional School.

== Performance history ==
The Steiner Brothers first came to the attention of the Hollywood community after performing at a Christmas party thrown by Martin and Lewis in 1952. This informal performance impressed the crowd of professional entertainers, and they were soon being booked professionally, including performances at the Moulin Rouge nightclub in Los Angeles. They were booked for three performances on The Dinah Shore Show in 1957-1958 after auditioning for Dinah Shore in a dance studio their parents had set up in the family's garage. Other television shows the group performed on included The Mickey Mouse Club (1956), The George Burns Show (1959), The Garry Moore Show (1959), The Ed Sullivan Show (1963), and The Jerry Lewis Show (1963). In live performance the brothers performed with many top stars of mid 20th century, including Frank Sinatra, Judy Garland, Bob Hope, and Jerry Lewis.
