= Allison Fonte =

American actress and pianist

Allison Fonte (born June 6, 1964) is an American actress and pianist who was a 12- to 13-year-old mousketeer of seasons 5-6 of the television show The Mickey Mouse Club, a 1977 revival of the Disney television show that had originally aired between 1955 and 1959.

Fonte was born in Buena Park, California. By the time she was seven she was playing piano, dancing, and appearing in commercials for Pacific Gas & Electric and Lawry's. At age nine she was performing at local shopping centers including regular shows at the "Old Town Mall" in Torrance, California. While doing some work at the Al Gilbert Studio in 1975 she was noticed by a talent scout who ended up inviting her to interview and later, audition for the show.

After her stint with the New Mickey Mouse Club, Allison attended Stanford University and was a founding partner in a creative firm in New York City called Pompei A.D. She spun off part of that company into Allison Fonte Public Relations, also in New York. Allison attended the New Mouseketeers' reunion in May 2001, along with eight other 1970s Mouseketeers.

== Sources ==
- The New Mickey Mouse Show
