= The Mickey Mouse Club =

American variety television show

- The original logo used during 1955–1959
- Also known as: The New Mickey Mouse Club (1977–1979); The All-New Mickey Mouse Club (1989–1996); MMC (1993–1996); Club Mickey Mouse (2017–2018)
- Created by: Walt Disney; Hal Adelquist
- Presented by: Jimmie Dodd; Roy Williams; Fred Newman; Mowava Pryor; Terri Eoff/Misner; Chasen Hampton; Tiffini Hale
- Theme music composer: Jimmie Dodd
- Country of origin: United States
- No. of seasons: 14
- No. of episodes: 620

Production
- Producer: Bill Walsh (1955–1959)
- Running time: 22–44 minutes
- Production companies: Walt Disney Productions; Blue Wave Productions (1989–1996)

Original release
- Network: ABC
- Release: October 3, 1955 – September 25, 1959
- Network: Syndication
- Release: January 17, 1977 – January 12, 1979
- Network: Disney Channel
- Release: April 24, 1989 – March 7, 1996

The Mickey Mouse Club is an American variety television show created by Walt Disney and produced by Walt Disney Productions. It aired intermittently from 1955 to 1996 and briefly returned to social media in 2017. The program was first televised for four seasons, from 1955 to 1959, by ABC. This original run featured a regular, but ever-changing cast of mostly child, tween or teen performers. ABC broadcast reruns weekday afternoons during the 1958–1959 season, airing right after American Bandstand. The show was revived three times after its initial 1955–1959 run on ABC, first from 1977 to 1979 for first-run syndication as The New Mickey Mouse Club, then from 1989 to 1996 as The All-New Mickey Mouse Club (also known to fans as MMC from 1993 to 1996) airing on Disney Channel, and again from 2017 to 2018 with the moniker Club Mickey Mouse airing on internet social media. An upcoming special is being produced for Disney+.

The character of Mickey Mouse appeared in every show, not only in vintage cartoons originally made for theatrical release, but also in the opening, interstitial, and closing segments made especially for the show. In both the vintage cartoons and new animated segments, Mickey was voiced by his creator Walt Disney, who had previously voiced the character theatrically from Steamboat Willie to Fun and Fancy Free.

== Before the television series ==
The first official theater-based Mickey Mouse Club began on June 29, 1929, at the Fox Dome Theatre in Venice, California, alongside a showing of the Mickey Mouse short The Gallopin' Gaucho. This would later expand to other states, including the Fox Theatre in Sheboygan, Wisconsin, on November 30 and the Elsinore Theater in Salem, Oregon, on December 21, with more than 60 other movie theaters hosting clubs across nationwide by March 31. The Club released its first issue of the Official Bulletin of the Mickey Mouse Club on April 15, 1930. By 1932, the club had one million members, and in 1933, its first UK/British club opened at Darlington's Arcade Cinema. This didn't last long as Disney began to phase out the club in 1935.

== The original: 1955–1959 show ==
=== Members ===
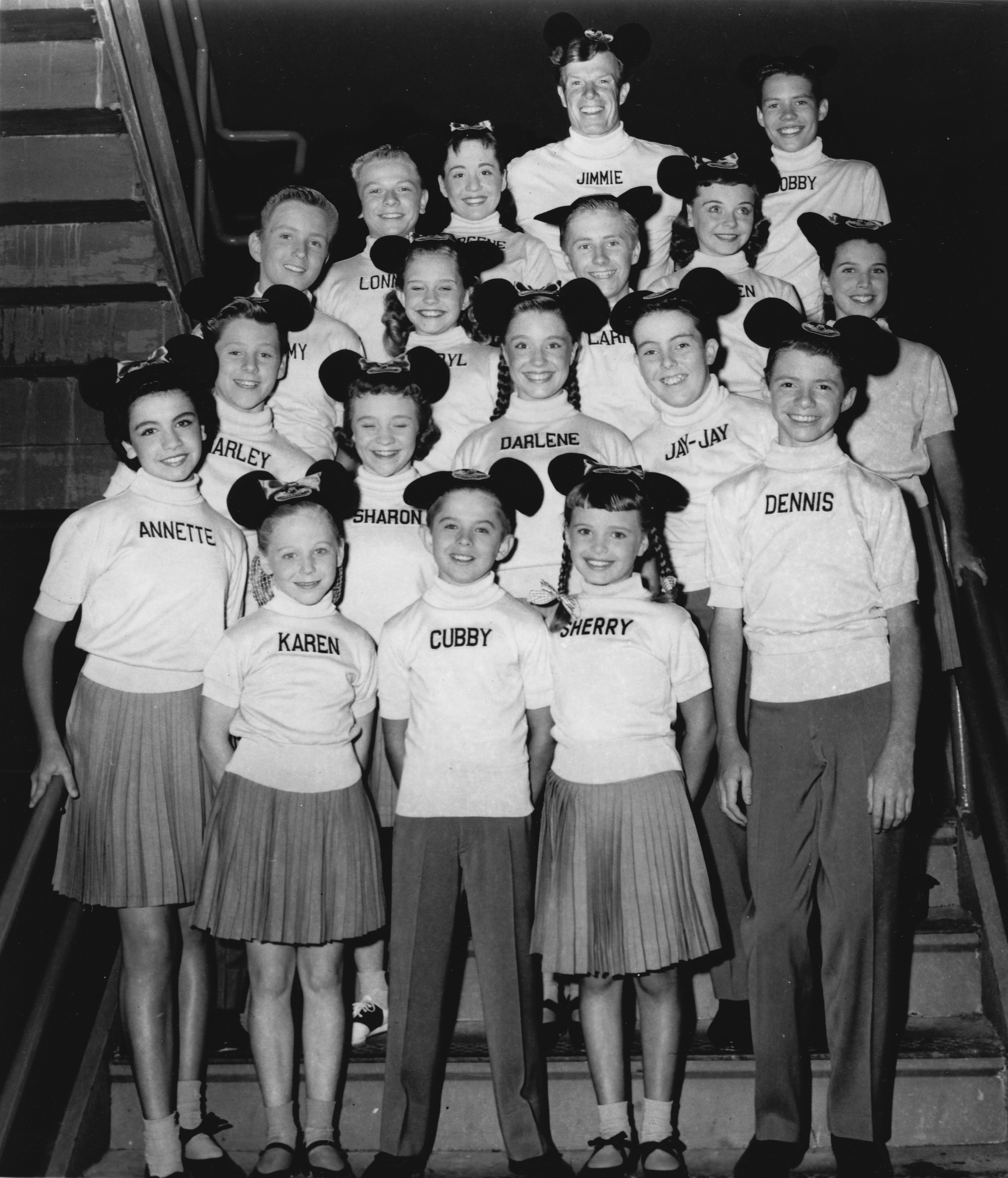
1956 publicity photo of the Mouseketeers

The Mickey Mouse Club was hosted by Jimmie Dodd, a songwriter and the Head Mouseketeer, who provided leadership both on and off the screen. In addition to his other contributions, he often provided short segments encouraging younger viewers to make the right moral choices. These little "homilies" became known as "Doddisms". Roy Williams, a staff artist at Disney, also appeared in the show as the Big Mouseketeer. Williams suggested that the Mickey and Minnie Mouse ears should be worn by the show's cast members. Inspired by a visual gag in The Karnival Kid, he helped create these ears, along with Chuck Keehne, Hal Adelquist, and Bill Walsh.

The main cast members were called Mouseketeers, and they performed in a variety of musical and dance numbers, as well as some informational segments. The most popular of the Mouseketeers constituted the so-called red team, who appeared each day in the show's opening roll call and closing segments. Nine of those Red Team Mouseketeers were kept under contract for the entire run of the show (1955–1959):

- Sharon Baird
- Bobby Burgess
- Lonnie Burr
- Tommy Cole
- Annette Funicello
- Darlene Gillespie
- Cubby O'Brien
- Karen Pendleton
- Doreen Tracey

Other Mouseketeers who were Red Team members, but weren't under contract for the entire run included:

- Nancy Abbate (only first year)
- Johnny Crawford (only first year)
- Dennis Day (first and second year; was in the blue team for most of the first year, but he moved to the red team at the end of the first year)
- Cheryl Holdridge (second and third year)
- Mike Smith (only first year)
- Jay-Jay Solari (only second year)
- Don Underhill (only first year; joined the blue team by the end of the first year)

The remaining Mouseketeers, who were members of the white or blue teams, were Don Agrati (who was later known as Don Grady when he starred as "Robbie" on My Three Sons), Sherry Alberoni, Billie Jean Beanblossom, Eileen Diamond, Dickie Dodd (not related to Jimmie Dodd), Mary Espinosa, Bonnie Lynn Fields, Judy Harriet, Linda Hughes, Dallas Johann, John Lee Johann, Bonni Lou Kern, Charley Laney, Larry Larsen, Paul Petersen, Lynn Ready, Mickey Rooney Jr., Tim Rooney, Mary Sartori, Bronson Scott, Margene Storey, Ronnie Steiner, and Mark Sutherland. Larry Larsen, on only for the 1956–57 season, was the oldest Mouseketeer, being born in 1939, and Bronson Scott, on only the 1955–56 season, was the youngest Mouseketeer, being born in July 1947. Among the thousands who auditioned, but did not make the cut, were future Oscar-winning vocalist/songwriter Paul Williams and future Primetime Emmy Award-winning actress Candice Bergen.

The 39 Mouseketeers and the seasons in which they were featured (with the team color to which they belonged are listed for each season):

Mouseketeers
Mouseketeers	Years	Seasons			
Mouseketeers	Years	1	2	3	4
Bobby Burgess	1955–1959				
Annette Funicello	1955–1959				
Darlene Gillespie	1955–1959				
Cubby O'Brien	1955–1959				
Karen Pendleton	1955–1959				
Doreen Tracey	1955–1959				
Sharon Baird	1955–1959				*
Tommy Cole	1955–1959	*			*
Lonnie Burr	1955–1959				-
Dennis Day	1955–1957	*		-	-
Nancy Abbate	1955–1956		-	-	-
Johnny Crawford	1955–1956		-	-	-
Mike Smith	1955–1956		-	-	-
Don Underhill	1955–1956		-	-	-
Bonni Lou Kern	1955–1956		-	-	-
Tim Rooney	1955–1956	*	-	-	-
Mary Sartori	1955–1956		-	-	-
Bronson Scott	1955–1956		-	-	-
Mark Sutherland	1955–1956		-	-	-
John Lee Johan	1955–1956	*	-	-	-
Billie Jean Beanblossom	1955–1956		-	-	-
Mary Espinosa	1955–1956		-	-	-
Judy Harriet	1955–1956		-	-	-
Dallas Johann	1955–1956	*	-	-	-
Paul Petersen	1955–1956	*	-	-	-
Mickey Rooney Jr.	1955–1956	*	-	-	-
Dickie Dodd	1955–1956	*	-	-	-
Ron Steiner	1955–1956	*	-	-	-
Cheryl Holdridge	1956–1958	-			-
Jay-Jay Solari	1956–1957	-		-	-
Sherry Alberoni	1956–1957	-		-	-
Eileen Diamond	1956–1957	-		-	-
Charley Laney	1956–1957	-		-	-
Larry Larsen	1956–1957	-		-	-
Margene Storey	1956–1957	-		-	-
Don Grady	1957–1958	-	-		-
Bonnie Lynn Fields	1957–1958	-	-		-
Linda Hughes	1957–1958	-	-		-
Lynn Ready	1957–1958	-	-		-

Notes: Cole and Day were originally blue & white team members, but were promoted to the red team later in the first season.

Johann, Petersen, and the Rooney brothers were all let go early in the first season. Dallas's brother John Lee replaced him, while Dodd and Steiner were hired as replacements for the Rooney brothers.

For the show's fourth season, only a small amount of new footage was filmed and was interspliced with material from previous seasons. Only six of the Mouseketeers—Funicello, Gillespie, Tracey, Burgess, Pendleton, and O'Brien—were believed to have been called back for the filming of new material, while Cole and Baird were merely used for some publicity material.

=== Adult co-hosts ===
- Jimmie Dodd
- Roy Williams
- Bob Amsberry

Other notable non-Mouseketeer performers appeared in several dramatic segments:

- Tim Considine
- Tommy Kirk
- Roberta Shore (Jymme Shore)
- David Stollery
- Judy Nugent
- Kevin Corcoran (Moochie)
- J. Pat O'Malley
- Sammy Ogg
- Alvy Moore
- Julius Sumner Miller as "Professor Wonderful"

These non-Mouseketeers primarily appeared in several original serials filmed for the series, only some of which have appeared in reruns. Other Mouseketeers were also featured in some of the serials, particularly Annette Funicello and Darlene Gillespie.

=== Major serials ===
Major serials included:

- Spin and Marty starring Tim Considine and David Stollery
- The Hardy Boys starring Tim Considine and Tommy Kirk
- Corky and White Shadow, starring Darlene Gillespie
- Walt Disney Presents: Annette, starring Annette Funicello
- Adventure in Dairyland, featuring Annette Funicello and Sammy Ogg, and introducing Kevin Corcoran as Moochie
- Jiminy Cricket educational serials (four animated series educating kids on different topics)
- The Adventures of Clint and Mac (starring Neil Wolfe as Clint Rogers and Jonathan Bailey as Alastair "Mac" MacIntosh)
- Boys of the Western Sea (English-dubbed Danish film divided into nine 10-minute segments)

=== Music ===
The opening theme, "The Mickey Mouse March", was written by the show's primary adult host, Jimmie Dodd. It was also reprised at the end of each episode, with the slower "it's time to say goodbye" verse. A shorter version of the opening title was used later in the series, in syndication, and on Disney Channel reruns. Dodd also wrote many other songs used in individual segments throughout the series.

=== Show themes ===
Each day of the week had a special show theme, which was reflected in the several segments. The themes were:

- Monday – Fun with Music Day
- Tuesday – Guest Star Day
- Wednesday – Anything Can Happen Day
- Thursday – Circus Day
- Friday – Talent Round-up Day

=== Scheduling and air times ===
The series ran on ABC Television for an hour each weekday in the 1955 and the 1956 seasons (from 5:00 - 6:00 pm ET), and only a half-hour weekdays in 1957, the final season to feature new programming. Although the show returned for a 1958 season, these programs were repeats from the first two seasons, recut into a half-hour format. The Mickey Mouse Club was featured on Mondays, Wednesdays, and Fridays, and Walt Disney's Adventure Time, featuring reruns of The Mickey Mouse Club serials and several re-edited segments from Disneyland and Walt Disney Presents, appeared on Tuesdays and Thursdays.

=== Cancellation ===
Although the show remained popular, ABC decided to cancel it after its fourth season ended, because Disney and the ABC network could not come to terms for its renewal. The cancellation of the show in September 1959 was attributed to several factors: the Disney studios did not explain high profit margins from merchandise sales, sponsors were uninterested in educational programming for children, and many commercials were needed to pay for the show. After canceling The Mickey Mouse Club, ABC also refused to let Disney air the show on another network. Walt Disney filed a lawsuit against ABC, and won the damages in a settlement the following year, but he had to agree that both the Mickey Mouse Club and Zorro could not be aired on any major network. This left Walt Disney Presents (initially titled Disneyland, later retitled Walt Disney's Wonderful World of Color when it moved to NBC) as the only Disney series that was left on prime time until 1972 when The Mouse Factory went on the air. The prohibition, which prevented major U.S. broadcast networks from airing the original Mickey Mouse Club (or any later version of it), was disputed when Disney acquired ABC in 1996. Although it would not air on ABC again, Disney ran it on Disney Channel's "Vault Disney" block from 1998 to 2002.

=== Australian tour ===
Although the series had been ended in the US, many members of the cast assembled for highly successful tours of Australia in 1959 and 1960. The television series was very successful in Australia, and was still running on Australian television. The cast surprised Australian audiences, as by then they had physically matured and in some cases, bore little resemblance to the cast of youths with whom Australians were so familiar. Mainstream television did not reach Australia until 1956, so the series screened well into the 1960s when the back catalog expired.

=== Syndication ===
In response to continuing audience demand, the original Mickey Mouse Club went into edited syndicated half-hour reruns that enjoyed wide distribution starting in the Autumn 1962, achieving strong ratings especially during its first three seasons in syndicated release. Due to its popularity in some markets, a few stations continued to carry it into 1968 before the series was finally withdrawn from syndication. Some new features were added such as Fun with Science or "Professor Wonderful" (with scientist Julius Sumner Miller) and Marvelous Marvin in the 1964–65 season; Jimmie Dodd appeared in several of these new segments before his death in November 1964. Several markets expanded the program back to an hour's daily run time during the 1960s repeat cycle by adding locally produced and hosted portions involving educational subjects and live-audience participation of local children, in a manner not unlike Romper Room.

In response to an upsurge in demand from baby boomers entering adulthood, the show again went into syndicated reruns from January 20, 1975, until January 14, 1977. It has since been rerun on cable specialty channels Disney in the United States and Family in Canada. The original Mickey Mouse Club films aired five days a week on the Disney Channel from its launch in 1983 until the third version of the series began in 1989. The last airing of the edited 1950s material was on Disney Channel's Vault Disney from 1997 to September 2002. During the baseball seasons in 1975 and 1976, WGN-TV in Chicago, Illinois, aired the show on a delayed basis due to Cubs baseball coverages.

=== Reunions ===
Annette Funicello and Tim Considine were reunited on The New Mickey Mouse Club in 1977. Darlene Gillespie and Cubby O'Brien were also reunited on another episode of the same series.

Of the 39 original Mouseketeers, 31 were reunited for a television special, which aired on Disney's Wonderful World, on November 23, 1980. Paul Williams – who hosted the special – and Tim Considine were named Honorary Mouseketeers during the special.

Cast members Annette Funicello, Bobby Burgess, Tommy Cole, Sharon Baird, Don Grady, and Sherry Alberoni were reunited on the 100th episode of The All-New Mickey Mouse Club, during the show's third season in 1990.

Mouseketeers Doreen Tracey, Cubby O'Brien, Sherry Alberoni, Sharon Baird, Don Grady, Cheryl Holdridge, Bobby Burgess, Karen Pendleton, Tommy Cole, and Mary Espinosa performed together at Disneyland in Autumn 2005, in observance of Disneyland's 50th birthday, and the 50th anniversary of the television premiere of The Mickey Mouse Club.

== Talent Roundup stars ==
- Larry Ashurst
- Janice Crowe
- Peter Lee Palmer
- Mark Sutherland
- Bo Wagner
- Pamela Beaird
- Barbara Boylan
- Mary Sartori
- John F. Smith
- Maxine Grossman
- Linda Hughes
- Cheryl Weinberg
- Ronnie Wilson
- Riley Wilson
- Jimmie Fields
- Donna Loren
- Ray Little

== 1977–1979 revival: The New Mickey Mouse Club ==
In 1977, Walt Disney Productions revived the concept, but modernized the show aesthetically, with a new, disco re-recording of the theme song and a more diverse group of young-aged cast members instead of 1950s original version. The settings were brightly colored and simpler than the detailed black-and-white artwork of the original. Like the original, almost every day's episode included a vintage cartoon, though usually in color from the late 1930s onward. The 1977 Mouseketeers were part of the halftime show of Super Bowl XI on January 9, 1977.

=== Serials ===
Serials were usually vintage Disney films, cut into segments for twice-weekly inclusion. Films included Third Man on the Mountain, The Misadventures of Merlin Jones and its sequel The Monkey's Uncle (both starring Tommy Kirk), Emil and the Detectives (retitled as The Three Skrinks), Tonka (retitled A Horse Called Comanche), The Horse Without a Head (about an inanimate toy horse), and Toby Tyler (starring Kevin Corcoran). In addition, one original serial was produced, The Mystery of Rustler's Cave, starring Ted Gehring, Kim Richards, and Robbie Rist. Often shown were scenes from animated Disney films, from Snow White to The Jungle Book billed as "Mouseka Movie Specials".

=== Theme days ===
Theme days were:

- Monday: Who, What, Why, Where, When and How
- Tuesday: Let's Go
- Wednesday: Surprise
- Thursday: Discovery
- Friday: Showtime (at Disneyland, with performers usually at Plaza Gardens)

=== Syndication ===
The series premiered on January 17, 1977, on 38 local television stations in the United States, and by June of that same year, when the series was officially ended, about 70 stations in total had picked up the series. Additional stations picked up the canceled program, which continued to run until January 12, 1979; 130 new episodes, with much of the original material repackaged and a bit of new footage added, and a shortened version of the theme song, was produced to start airing September 5, 1977. Since the 1970s, the series has aired only briefly and sporadically in reruns, and only on Disney Channel's Vault Disney nighttime block (1997–2002). Unlike its 1950s predecessor and the 1989–96 series that followed, which had DVD releases of select episodes in July 2005, this version has not had a DVD release and has been largely forgotten by many, including many children of the 1970s who made it their club. On November 20, 1977, "The Mouseketeers at Walt Disney World" was shown on The Wonderful World of Disney. WGN-TV in Chicago, Illinois, also aired this version on a delayed basis in 1977 and 1978 during the Cubs baseball season due to game coverages. Action for Children's Television successfully got the show canceled because of their objections to the types of commercials that aired during the program. Outside of its home country, it also aired on BBC One in the United Kingdom from 1978 to 1980, and on TVB Pearl in Hong Kong from 1978.

=== Cast ===
The cast of 12 (five boys and seven girls) has more diverse background than the original, 1950s version. Several 1977–78 cast members went on to become TV stars and other notable icons.

The show's most notable alumna was Lisa Whelchel (born in 1963, in Littlefield, Texas), who later starred in the NBC television sitcom The Facts of Life, which ran from 1979 to 1988 for 10 years, before becoming a well-known Christian author, and overall runner-up, and winner of the $100,000 viewers' choice award, on a 2012 season of the CBS television reality series Survivor. Mouseketeer Julie Piekarski (born in 1963 in St. Louis, Missouri) also appeared with Lisa Whelchel on the first season of The Facts of Life. Kelly Parsons (born in 1964, in Coral Gables, Florida) went on to become a beauty queen and runner-up to Miss USA.

Other Mouseketeers (from seasons 1–2) from the 1977 show:

- William "Billy"/"Pop" Attmore: born at US military base in Landstuhl, West Germany, 1965; appeared in a few films before and after the series, a final-season episode of The Brady Bunch ("Kelly's Kids"), an ABC Afterschool Special, "Where Do Teenagers Come From?", and as a streetwise hood in the short-lived Eischied crime drama; died July 30, 2023, due to harm.
- Scott Craig: born in Van Nuys, California, in 1964; lived in Las Vegas, Nevada, died December 30, 2003, from a respiratory illness.
- Benita "Nita" DiGiampaolo/Dee: born in Long Beach, California, in 1966; appeared at the last end of an episode in 1981 of Fantasy Island as Elena. Dee appeared in ABC Family Weekends in 1978 as Nita and 1978 as Maria. Dee also starred in an ABC Afterschool Special, "Where Do Teenagers Come From?", Upbeat Aesop (ABC) produced by Ron Miziker (A Disney executive).
- Mindy Feldman: born in Burbank, California, in 1968; sister of actor Corey Feldman.
- Angel Florez: born in Stockton, California, in 1963; died on April 25, 1995, from an AIDS-related illness.
- Allison Fonte: born in Buena Park, California, in 1964.
- Shawnte Northcutte: born in Los Angeles, California, in 1965; appeared on an episode of The Facts of Life, as Madge.
- Todd Turquand: born in Hollywood, California, in 1964.
- Curtis Wong: born in Vancouver, British Columbia, Canada in 1962; appeared on an episode of Diff'rent Strokes, as an assistant karate instructor under Soon-Tek Oh.

Disney voice actor and sound effects editor Wayne Allwine voiced Mickey Mouse in the animated lead-ins for the show, replacing Jimmy MacDonald, who in 1947 had replaced Walt Disney as the voice of Mickey for theatrical short cartoons. Walt Disney was the original voice of Mickey, voiced Mickey for the original 1954–59 run, and provided the voice for animated introductions to the original television show, but he died in 1966. Following MacDonald's tenure, Allwine provided the voice for the character up to his death in 2009.

Future rock musician Courtney Love (wife of the late Nirvana lead singer Kurt Cobain) claims to have auditioned for a part on the show, reading a poem by Sylvia Plath; she was not selected.

Former Mouseketeers Annette Funicello and serial star Tim Considine guest-starred in one episode; former Mouseketeers Darlene Gillespie and Cubby O'Brien were also reunited on another episode.

=== Theme song and soundtrack ===
The lyrics of the "Mickey Mouse Club March" theme song were slightly different from the original, with two additional lines: "He's our favorite Mouseketeer; we know you will agree" and "Take some fun and mix in love, our happy recipe".

A soundtrack album was released with the show.

A new rendition of the "Mickey Mouse Club March" was made later on in 1999 by Mannheim Steamroller, a contemporary band, in hopes of connecting new-age children and their parents who watched the Mickey Mouse Club.

=== Distribution ===
This incarnation was not distributed by Disney only; while Disney did produce the series, it was co-produced and distributed by SFM Entertainment, which also handled 1970s-era syndication of the original 1950s series (Disney since re-acquired only distribution rights).

== 1989–1996 revival: The All-New Mickey Mouse Club ==
Reruns of the original The Mickey Mouse Club began airing on Disney Channel with its 1983 launch. While the show was popular with younger audiences, Disney Channel executives felt it had become dated over the years, particularly due it being aired in black-and-white. Their answer was to create a brand-new, revived version of the club, one targeted at contemporary audiences. The all-new "club members" wore Mouseketeer varsity jackets instead of "Mickey's ears"-shaped hats. This show was called The All-New Mickey Mouse Club (also known as MMC to fans). This version was produced by Blue Wave Productions instead of directly by Disney, and was filmed at the Disney-MGM Studios.

This version of the series features a number of cast members who later established careers in the entertainment industry (such as music and film), including Ryan Gosling, Justin Timberlake, JC Chasez, Britney Spears, Christina Aguilera, Keri Russell, Deedee Magno, Rhona Bennett, Chase Hampton, and Nikki DeLoach.

Jessica Simpson and Matt Damon auditioned for the show but were not cast. Other notable figures who reportedly auditioned but did not make the final cut include Kirsten Dunst, Ben Affleck, Countess Vaughn, Ryan Phillippe, Brittany Murphy, Joey Fatone, Donald Faison, Nick Carter, and Sara Bareilles.

Fred Newman was the main adult co-host from the beginning of the series until season six. In the first season, Newman was joined by Mowava Pryor as co-host. She was then replaced by Terri Eoff from the fourth until the sixth season. By the show's final season, season seven, two original members, Chase Hampton and Tiffini Hale, became the co-hosts.

This was also the first version of the club to have any studio audience, though only a moderate-sized group.

Former Mouseketeer Don Grady guest-starred in the first-season finale. Grady, along with fellow Mouseketeers Annette Funicello, Bobby Burgess, Tommy Cole, Sharon Baird, and Sherry Alberoni, were reunited on the 100th episode, during the show's third season. Funicello later appeared on the show again, in an interview with the Mouseketeer Lindsey Alley.

=== Scheduling and air times ===
For the first five seasons, the series aired Monday through Friday at 5:30 pm. The show's sixth season aired Monday to Thursday. In its final season, it aired Thursdays only at 7:00 pm (later moved a half hour later, to 7:30 pm). The series premiered Monday, April 24, 1989, ended production in October 1994, and aired its last original episode in 1996. Seasons three and five had the most episodes at 55 each, with seasons one, two, and seven running about 45 episodes. Seasons four and six had about 36 episodes each.

=== Skits ===
The show was known for its sketch comedy. Some of the sketches played off well-known films, musicals, and even cartoons, as well as holiday-related skits. During the final season, some of the skits showed everyday occurrences in the lives of teenagers.

=== Music videos ===
The series featured music videos of the Mouseketeers singing their versions of popular songs in front of a live studio audience or at locations within Walt Disney World. This became one of the most popular segments. Due to the age of both the performers and the target demographic, lyrics with objectionable content were generally edited out of the songs and replaced with more appropriate language.

=== Live concerts and performances ===
A unique feature of the show was the Mouseketeers performing concerts on different days (which were usually taped the day before or in summer, when the children had more time). During the final season, the concerts were replaced primarily by live performances that featured singing and dancing in front of the audience.

=== Theme days ===
This version maintained the "theme day" format from the past two versions. When Disney decided to revamp the show for its final season, the show was reduced to a single weekly airing, shown only on Thursdays. Although still produced as a daily series during the final season taping in 1994, Disney Channel, after canceling the series once season-seven production had ended, decided to air the final season in a weekly format, therefore stretching the first-run episodes into early 1996. The final season premiered in May 1995, almost a year after production had started and more than six months after the series finale was taped.

Theme days were:

- Music Day – Mondays (seasons 1–5), Tuesdays (season 6)
- Guest Day – Tuesdays (seasons 1–5), Mondays (season 6)
- Anything Can Happen Day – Wednesdays (seasons 1–5)
- Party Day – Thursdays (seasons 1–4, 6), Fridays (season 5)
- Hall of Fame Day – Fridays (seasons 1–4), Thursdays (season 5), Wednesdays (season 6)

=== Mouseketeer roster ===
The adult co-hosts for the show were Fred Newman (1989–1993), Mowava Pryor (1989–1990), and Terri Misner Eoff (1991–1993), along ex-Mousekeeters Tiffini Hale (1994), and Chase Hampton (1994) in the final season.

The 35 Mouseketeers and the seasons in which they were featured are:

Mouseketeers
Mouseketeers	Year(s)	Seasons						
Mouseketeers	Year(s)	1	2	3	4	5	6	7
Josh Ackerman	1989–1994							
Lindsey Alley	1989–1994							
Jennifer McGill	1989–1994							
Tiffini Hale	1989–1991, 1994				*	-	-	
Chase Hampton	1989–1991, 1994				*	-	-	
Albert Fields	1989–1991				*	-	-	-
Deedee Magno	1989–1991				*	-	-	-
Damon Pampolina	1989–1991				*	-	-	-
Brandy Brown	1989–1990				-	-	-	-
Raquel Herring	1989			-	-	-	-	-
Braden Danner	1989		-	-	-	-	-	-
David Kater	1989		-	-	-	-	-	-
Kevin Osgood	1989–1992	-					-	-
Ricky Luna	1990–1994	-	-					
Ilana Miller	1990–1994	-	-					
Marc Worden	1990–1994	-	-					
Mylin Brooks Stoddard	1990–1992	-	-				-	-
Jason Minor	1990–1992	-	-				-	-
Rhona Bennett	1991–1994	-	-	-				
Nita Booth Young	1991–1994	-	-	-				
JC Chasez	1991–1994	-	-	-				
Dale Godboldo	1991–1994	-	-	-				
Tony Lucca	1991–1994	-	-	-				
Matt Morris	1991–1994	-	-	-				
Keri Russell	1991–1993	-	-	-				-
Blain Carson	1991–1992	-	-	-			-	-
Tasha Danner	1991–1992	-	-	-			-	-
Terra McNair Deva	1991–1992	-	-	-			-	-
Christina Aguilera	1993–1994	-	-	-	-	-		
Nikki DeLoach	1993–1994	-	-	-	-	-		
T.J. Fantini	1993–1994	-	-	-	-	-		
Ryan Gosling	1993–1994	-	-	-	-	-		
Tate Lynche	1993–1994	-	-	-	-	-		
Britney Spears	1993–1994	-	-	-	-	-		
Justin Timberlake	1993–1994	-	-	-	-	-		

Note: For the show's fourth season, Albert Fields, Tiffini Hale, Chase Hampton, Deedee Magno, and Damon Pampolina were featured in segments as The Party, primarily in footage separate from the rest of the cast.

=== Emerald Cove ===
The last three seasons of MMC had a prerecorded drama series called Emerald Cove with the older cast members:

- Rhona Bennett
- J.C. Chasez
- Dale Godboldo
- Ricky Luna
- Tony Lucca
- Ilana Miller
- Keri Russell
- Marc Worden
- Matt Morris
- Jennifer McGill
- Joshua Ackerman
- Nikki Deloach

== 2017 revival: Club Mickey Mouse ==
The Mickey Mouse Club was rebooted under the name Club Mickey Mouse with a new set of Mouseketeers in September 2017, and for the first time, the series was made available on Facebook and Instagram, rather than its original half hour to full hour format on television, and is more like a reality show than a variety show, with about 90% of its content being behind the scenes. The series is unrelated to a Malaysian television series of the same name produced around the same time, which bears more resemblance to the structure of previous Mickey Mouse Club productions.

This incarnation of The Mickey Mouse Club featured eight Mouseketeers who ranged in age from 15 to 18: Regan Aliyah, Jenna Alvarez, Ky Baldwin, Gabe De Guzman, Leanne Tessa Langston, Brianna Mazzola, Sean Oliu, and Will Simmons. The Mouseketeers were also joined by the guest star Todrick Hall, who also served as a mentor to the cast during the casting, and Jennifer Chia as the host.

The series was produced by Disney Digital Network. No new episodes or music videos have been produced since 2018, as DDN had undergone financial difficulties and shut down the year after, effectively canceling Club Mickey Mouse.

== Future ==
On July 16, 2026, Deadline Hollywood reported that a pilot for a reboot had been ordered by Disney+. This version is set to feature Hudson Stone, Casey Trotter, Brooklynn Pitts, Varonica Mitchell, Erianthe Akaata, Scarlett London Diviney, Michael Cash, Kauani, Carter Barnes, Scarlett Grace Petty, and Yonas Kibreab.

== International revivals ==
=== 2015 Korean revival: The Mickey Mouse Club ===
A new version of the series debuted on July 23, 2015, on Disney Channel Korea. The format of revival included musical performances, games, and skits, as same as the original one in the US. The series had two pilot episodes and 10 regular episodes. The Mouseketeers consisted of nine members of S.M. Entertainment's pre-debut trainees team SM Rookies, consisting of five boys – Mark, Jeno, Haechan, Jaemin, and Jisung – and four girls – Koeun, Hina, Herin, and Lami.

The series was hosted by Leeteuk of the K-pop boy band Super Junior.

The show ended on December 17 the same year.

=== 2017–2021 Malaysian revival: Club Mickey Mouse ===
The Mickey Mouse Club
- Also known as: Club Mickey Mouse Malaysia
- Based on: The Mickey Mouse Club
- Country of origin: Malaysia
- Original languages: English; Malay
- No. of seasons: 4
- No. of episodes: 48

Production
- Running time: 22–28 minutes
- Production company: Red Communications Sdn. Bhd.

Original release
- Network: Disney Channel Asia (2017–2020); Disney+ Hotstar (2021)
- Release: September 15, 2017 – July 28, 2021

Club Mickey Mouse was created in Malaysia. The format included musical performances, games and comedy sketches.

The series was hosted by YouTube personality, Charis Ow, and premiered on Disney Channel Asia on September 15, 2017. The series was renewed for a second season, which premiered on July 6, 2018, and a third season which premiered on June 14, 2019. All members appeared as guest stars (except Dheena Menon) on Episode 14 ("Friends in Need, Indeed!") on Disney Channel Asia Original Series, Wizards of Warna Walk.

Natasya left the show in 2018, and was replaced by Ellya. Charis and Dheena both left the show in 2020, and Disney Channel Asia subsequently cast two new Mouseketeers, Eric and Melynna, from an audition. Following the shutdown of the channel, season four of Club Mickey Mouse aired in 2021 exclusively on Disney+ Hotstar, instead, and SKTV Kids in 2023.

In November 2021, the fourth season of the show aired on Disney+ in selected territories. The series was removed from Disney+ on May 26, 2023, amid the Disney+ and Hulu purge.

Mouseketeers	Year(s)	Notes
Charis Ow	2017–2020	Head Mouseketeer
Dheena Menon	2017–2020	
Erissa Puteri Hashim	2017–2021	
Nur Aliantasha "Natasya" Hanafi	2017–2018	
Mohd Wafiy Ilhan Johan	2017–2021	
Ahmad Faiz Najib	2017–2021	
Gabriel Noel "Gabe" Pountney	2017–2021	
Ellya Keesha	2018–2021	
Eric Lau Löfstedt	2021	Head Mouseketeer
Melynna Rose	2021	

== Home media ==
- Walt Disney Treasures: The Mickey Mouse Club at UltimateDisney.com
- Mickey Mouse Club: Best of Britney, Justin & Christina at UltimateDisney.com

== See also ==
- Disney Club, the name of many television shows associated to Disney's content aired mostly in Europe
- Mickey Mouse Clubhouse, a computer-animated 2006-16 TV show for preschool-aged children with a very different format
