= Cheryl Waters (actress) =

American actress (1947–2025)

- Born: Cheryl Ann Waters; September 3, 1947; Honolulu, Hawaii Territory, U.S.
- Died: September 1, 2025 (aged 77); Sandpoint, Idaho, U.S.
- Other names: Leah Tate, Cheryl A. Waters
- Occupation: Actress
- Years active: 1971–1998

Cheryl Ann Waters (September 3, 1947 – September 1, 2025) was an American actress. Her most famous role was the female lead in the 1974 film, Macon County Line.

== Life and career ==
One of her earliest film appearances was in the 1971 biker film, Ride the Hot Wind, which starred Tommy Kirk and Sherry Bain. After that she played the part of Bonnie, a young woman having an affair with Robert Matthews, her psychology professor in Don Jones' 1971 exploitation film, Schoolgirls in Chains.

She played the female lead in Richard Compton's 1974 film, Macon County Line. Her character, the attractive Jenny Scott is making her way to Dallas and is picked up by good-time seeking brothers Chris and Wayne Dixon (played by Alan and Jesse Vint) who are making their way south-by-southwest. Their fun times eventually come to an end when they find trouble. In 1978, Image of Death was released, in which Waters played the part of Barbara Shields. Tony Bonner and Penne Hackforth-Jones co-starred in the film. Waters played the part of Lorraine Webster in the Real Mothers episode of The Trials of Rosie O'Neill which aired in September 1991.

Waters died on September 1, 2025, at the age of 78.

== Filmography ==
Film
Title	Role	Director	Year	Notes #
Didn't You Hear?	Paige	Skip Sherwood	1970	
Ride the Hot Wind		Duke Kelly	1971	
Schoolgirls in Chains	Bonnie	Don Jones	1973	credited as Leah Tate
Macon County Line	Jenny Scott	Richard Compton	1974	
Act of Vengeance	Tamara	Robert Kelljchian	1974	
Women Unchained	Susan	Kent Osborne	1974	
Image of Death	Barbara Shields	Kevin James Dobson	1978	
Cradle Song	Rene	Sharron Miller	1981	
Thunder Alley	Cowgirl	J. S. Cardone	1985	
Messenger of Death	Magda Beecham	J. Lee Thompson	1988	
A Climate for Killing	Birdy	J. S. Cardone	1991	

Television
Title	Episode #	Role	Director	Year	Notes #
Cannon	Tomorrow Ends at Noon	Charlotte Gates	William Wiard	1975	Credited as Cheryl A. Waters
Bronk	The Pickoff	Beverly	Sutton Roley	1975	
The Fisher Family	Reprise for the Lord	Nurse	Sharron Miller	1984	aka This Is the Life
The Fisher Family	Dark Journey		Sharron Miller	1984	aka This Is the Life
Cagney & Lacey	Turn, Turn, Turn: Part 2	Jane Beckwith	Sharron Miller	1987	
The Trials of Rosie O'Neill	State of Mind	Guard #1	Sharron Miller	1991	
The Trials of Rosie O'Neill	Real Mothers	Lorraine Webster	Sharron Miller	1991	
Any Day Now	Please Don't Tell My Mother		Sharron Miller	1988	

Misc
Title	Role	Director	Year	Notes #
The Slayer	assistant to director	J.S. Cardone	1982	
End of the Rainbow	Production designer	Laszlo Papas	1983	
Going Hollywood: The '30s	Set decorator	Julian Schlossberg	1984	Documentary
SiN	Computer Voice		1998	Video game
