= Lonnie Burr =

American entertainer and writer

- Born: Leonard Burr Babin; May 31, 1943 (age 83); Dayton, Kentucky
- Other name: The Velvet Smog
- Occupations: Actor; dancer/choreographer; singer; director; author
- Spouse: Diane Dickey (1970-present)

Lonnie Burr (born May 31, 1943) is an American actor, entertainer and writer best known as one of nine of the original thirty-nine Mouseketeers who remained under a seven-year contract for the complete filming (1955–1959) of Walt Disney’s children’s television show the Mickey Mouse Club. The Mickey Mouse Club was the first national TV show to star children who appeared primarily as themselves as well as acting as characters in scenes and musical numbers. The original show aired in syndication in the 1960s, reran again in 1975, then on the Disney Channel in the 1980s through the early 2000s.

After appearing on the show, Burr's entertainment career included work as a character actor, dancer, singer, and choreographer. His career as a writer included being a book author, playwright, lyricist, journalist, critic and poet. Throughout adulthood, he continued to honor his Disney experience. As he was quoted in an interview, "Whether I someday scale the Matterhorn or win my Pulitzer, I shall always be known as Mouseketeer Lonnie; that is the way the obituary will begin. I have come to learn that is a marvelous association."

== Early life ==
Burr was born in Dayton, Kentucky. The family moved to Highland Park, California when he was three. From 1st through 12th grade Lonnie attended Hollywood Professional School, a private school for children working in show business. He is of Danish, French, Ulster-Scots and German descent. His parents, Howard Ambrose Babin and Dorothy Doloris Burr, were a night club and vaudeville dance team that toured from 1934 to 1941 as "Dot and Dash". (An African-American team of the same name appeared in the 1935 film Temptation.)

== Early performances ==
At age four Burr started dance lessons with legendary tap teacher Willie Covan and was soon dancing, singing and doing imitations for live audiences and local, Pasadena, CA TV shows. He began acting on radio after turning professional at age five. By six (1949) he was working on national television, radio, films, theatre and commercials. His first two movie appearances were in the 1951 films A Yank in Korea and Queen for a Day, followed by M (1951 U.S. remake), Hans Christian Andersen (1952), The Greatest Show on Earth (1952) and Apache (1954).

Burr’s first recurring television role (1950–1951) was as next door neighbor Oliver Quimby on The Ruggles situation comedy starring Charlie Ruggles. He guest starred as Jimmy, title character in "The Holy Terror" episode of The Range Rider (1953), made ten appearances on The Colgate Comedy Hour, and also appeared on The Roy Rogers Show, The Alan Young Show, All Star Revue, The Donald O'Connor Show, and Father Knows Best.

On radio, he was heard on The Enchanted Lady as Buster Beetle, Prince Charming and other characters, the child lead on the popular NBC Radio soap opera Dr. Paul and in 1953 as Tiny Tim in Dickens’ A Christmas Carol on Stars Over Hollywood. For two years in the early 1950s he was also the national radio voice of the enthusiastic boy who loved Chef Boyardee spaghetti ("Oh Boy, it's Chef Boy-Ar-DEE !!"). After years of radio and voice-over work, Lonnie became the pre-recorded voice of the Smithsonian National Air and Space Museum in the 21st century giving visitors general information, opening and closing times and providing safety and emergency instructions.

Lonnie's career as a stage actor began at age six at California's renowned Pasadena Playhouse. After appearing in two plays, he performed his first stage lead there at age eight in The Strawberry Circle. His early television commercials included appearing during Space Patrol (1950s series) to eat a bowl of Chex, one of the show's sponsors, and The Lone Ranger, in which he and Clayton Moore (the original television Lone Ranger), both on horseback, promoted the goodness of Cheerios breakfast cereal. (Lonnie dismounted to enjoy his cereal at the breakfast table.)

== Mickey Mouse Club ==
In 1955 Lonnie signed a seven-year contract with Walt Disney Studios as one of twenty-four original Mouseketeers hired for the first season of The Mickey Mouse Club from the thousands of children who auditioned. As one of only four boys, of thirty-nine total kids, who remained under contract for the run of the series, Lonnie was a member of the "Red Team", the group that comprised the show's first string unit. Lonnie appeared in the show's opening number, "Roll Call", and closing number, "Alma Mater", segments daily for the first two seasons. Unfortunately, a prominent facial injury during rehearsal kept him off camera for the third season pre-filming of those two numbers, but he was otherwise an active season three Red Team member, continuing to perform in skits and musical variety numbers both solo and with other Mouseketeers. He is generally acknowledged to have been one of the show's three top dancers and his slightly husky singing voice and resemblance to singer Mel Tormé, nicknamed "The Velvet Fog", caused other Mouseketeers to call Lonnie "The Velvet Smog".

Lonnie appeared in more than 200 episodes of the original Mickey Mouse Club. The popularity he and other Red Team members enjoyed continued after ABC cancelled the series in 1959, as it was rerun in the 1960s and 1970s, then continued on the Disney Channel from the 1980s through the early 2000s. The "Mice", as the adult Mouseketeers often called themselves, continued to acquire new fans; eventually adults who were fans as children watched with their own children and grandchildren. Disney also licensed the shows internationally, and they were aired in five languages in forty-plus foreign countries including Japan, France, Mexico, Australia (twelve years), parts of South America, and in the 1980s and 1990s in Russia (U.S.S.R.) and the other Warsaw Pact countries.

== Roles as an adult ==
After The Mickey Mouse Club stopped filming in 1958, Lonnie took a hiatus from the entertainment business. At age fourteen he completed his senior year of high school. Accepted at UCLA, he received his Bachelor of Arts and Master of Arts degrees in Theatre Arts by age twenty. He completed a year toward a Ph.D. in English Literature a few years later, but decided to return to his professional careers in the performing arts and his new career as a published author. Burr resumed his performing career in the 1960s in plays, musical comedy, film, television, commercials, industrial films, night clubs and other live performances. He transitioned from child TV star to adult character actor, deliberately taking roles in which he could vary his appearance and attitude to the extent that in the 1980s Robert Osborne, then columnist for The Hollywood Reporter and later TCM host, named him "a master of disguises."

Live theatre is Burr’s favorite performing medium. His 45 drama, comedy and musical theatre performances include Gower Champion’s original Broadway production of Mack & Mabel (1974-75) with Robert Preston and Bernadette Peters; two productions of George M (1969), the first National Company with Joel Grey and on his own in a 1983 Las Vegas production; Death of a Salesman (1999) at the Olney Theatre Center; the Ford’s Theatre (Washington DC) production of The Grapes of Wrath (2005); a second revival of No, No Nanette; The Boys From Syracuse (Goodman Theatre, Chicago ); the premiere of "Over The Hill", a comedy he also wrote and directed; as the fascist Capitano Aldo Finzi in Tamara, Los Angeles’ longest running play (nine years); and the year-long Los Angeles production of 42nd Street (Shubert Theatre, Los Angeles). In Actors' Equity professional summer stock on both coasts, Lonnie co-starred as Spats Palazzo in Sugar with the late Arte Johnson, Marcellus in The Music Man with Peter Marshall, with Ginger Rogers in Coco, and with Elke Sommer in Irma La Douce.

Lonnie’s live appearances include performances during the 1980s, 1990s and early 2000s at both Disneyland and Walt Disney World (WDW) in 30-minute stage shows reuniting some of the original Mouseketeers, who performed new numbers and a few recreated from the original series. Lonnie also wrote and choreographed the first of these appearances.

As a promotion for the original Mickey Mouse Club’s return to television in the mid-1970s, Lonnie and other Mouseketeers appeared on Tomorrow, Tom Snyder’s national late night talk show from New York. Lonnie and three other Mouseketeers also visited Queens to appear at a Shea Stadium New York Mets game with Mickey Mouse, who was scheduled to throw out the first baseball. Instead, Mickey handed the ball to Lonnie, making him the only Mouseketeer to have thrown the opening ball for a Major League Baseball game. Mickey and Lonnie were together again in the 1980s when Disneyland promoted its extensively renovated New Fantasyland via a 10-stop Amtrak trip from California to New Orleans. Lonnie was the Disney spokesperson on local TV talk and news shows, children’s hospitals, schools, and in public meetings with city mayors and other officials.

Lonnie’s films since his Ph.D. semester include Live a Little, Love a Little (Elvis), Sweet Charity, The Hospital, The Prisoner of Second Avenue, Copacabana, Pink Lightning, Hook, Lionheart, The Silence of the Hams (Italian: 'Il Silenzio dei Prosciutti'), Newsies, Mr. Saturday Night, Illicit Behavior, Police Academy: Mission to Moscow and Lots of Luck with Annette Funicello.

While Lonnie and Annette had been in contact during the years after the Mickey Mouse Club, Lots of Luck marked the first and only adult acting appearance by two original Mouseketeers. In fact, Lonnie and Annette had been boyfriend-girlfriend on the first year of the Mickey Mouse Club, and had "gone steady" at a party for a few hours until her father found out and immediately made her give the ring back. But it was not until the 1994 publication of Annette’s autobiography, A Dream Is A Wish Your Heart Makes that Lonnie discovered that he was the fortunate young man who gave Annette her first kiss!

Among Lonnie’s 67 TV credits are guest roles on The Beverly Hillbillies, Hunter, Hill Street Blues, The New Gidget, Saved by the Bell, a recurring role on Falcon Crest, Murder She Wrote, Chicago Hope, Lois and Clark, L.A. Heat, Homicide: Life on the Streets, and daytime dramas Another World and General Hospital. He has been a guest on more than 100 national and local talk shows from the 1960s into the 21st century promoting the Mickey Mouse Club for Disney and his own books, criticism, poetry and plays.

As a writer, Lonnie is the author of a memoir, The Accidental Mouseketeer (2014) and Two for the Show: Great 20th Century Comedy Teams(2000). He has two poetry collections, forty-eight poems published in literary journals and newspapers and is the recipient of 11 poetry awards. He is a playwright with four produced plays (Occam's Razor, Over the Hill, Children Are Strangers and Exeunt All) and a musical (book and lyrics for Fantasies), which have been staged in Los Angeles, New York City, and Washington, DC, plus twenty-two nationally aired radio dramas for Heartbeat Theatre and two for American Radio Theatre. Finally, he is the author of numerous articles, essays, and both film and theatre criticism whose work has appeared in more than twenty national and regional newspapers and magazines including the Los Angeles Times, New York Times Syndicate, American Film, Cincinnati Enquirer, US, Louisville Today, Oui, Hartford Courant, Storyboard and online publications.

Burr was one of the hosts and the creative consultant (WGAw, second writer) for the 1980 ABC television special 25 Years of Mouseketeers (a.k.a. Mouseketeers 25th Anniversary Special). He was also instrumental in the creation of scripts for the Disneyland live performances by some of the original Mouseketeers throughout the 1980s and into the 1990s.

As a choreographer, Burr’s specialty is creating tap and jazz routines for actors, singers and personalities who are not trained dancers. Examples of his work include live and filmed Disney and Disneyland/WDW productions; his swing dance with Hayley Mills as junior high school teacher Miss Bliss in the "Save The Last Dance for Me" (2/4/1989) episode of Good Morning, Miss Bliss, the original Carl's Jr. guacamole burger "Flamenco, Ole!" commercial, plays and several industrial shows.

He has worked with such dance greats as Bob Fosse, Twyla Tharp, Vincent Paterson, Gower Champion, Larry Fuller, Lester Wilson, Kenny Ortega, Joe Layton, Tommy Tune, and Dee Dee Wood (The Sound of Music, Mary Poppins).

Burr has been an inveterate patron of libraries and museums since the early 1960s. Items from a number of his areas of interest now belong to Smithsonian National Museum of American History, Skirball Cultural Center, Thousand Oaks Library American Radio Archives (Thousand Oaks, CA), UCLA Film and Television Archive, Howard Gotlieb Archival Research Center of Boston University, The Paley Center for Media in New York City, Chicago's Museum of Broadcast Communications and The Huntington Library, Art Collections, and Botanical Gardens (San Marino, CA).
