= Jo Jo the Dog Faced Boy (song) =

"Jo Jo the Dog Faced Boy" was a novelty song made popular by Disney Mouseketeer, Annette Funicello. The song was written by Bob and Dick Sherman in collaboration with Los Angeles based songwriter Bob Roberts. The song reached #73 on Billboards's Hot 100 in 1959. "Jo Jo" was a follow-up to Annette's hit song "Tall Paul," which was the first rock and roll single by a female singer to reach the top ten. The Sherman Brothers went on to write the majority of Annette's early 1960s songs as well as winning two Oscars for Mary Poppins several years later.

The song references Fedor Jeftichew, a sideshow entertainer best known as "Jo-Jo, the Dog-Faced Man", who suffered from hypertrichosis. In the lyrics, homage is made to the popular song from the previous year, "Beep Beep" with the line, "Where in the world was the little Nash Rambler?".

In Canada the song reached #33 on the CHUM Charts.
