= The Horsemasters =

- Based on: The Horsemasters by Don Stanford
- Written by: William Fairchild; Ted Willis
- Directed by: William Fairchild
- Starring: Tommy Kirk; Annette Funicello; Janet Munro; Donald Pleasence
- Country of origin: United States
- Original language: English

Production
- Cinematography: Freddie Francis
- Running time: 85 minutes
- Production company: Walt Disney Productions

Original release
- Network: NBC
- Release: October 1, 1961

The Horsemasters is a 2-part episode of the Disneyland TV show from 1961 which screened theatrically in some countries.

The film was one of several Disney films that was shot in England. The hunt scenes were filmed at Thursley in Surrey, where the Three Horseshoes public house was used as a backdrop. It was Annette Funicello's first co-starring role in a feature film. The film included a song written by the Sherman Brothers, the first song which the duo ever wrote for a Disney project. The film received a comic book adaptation in the Four Color series by Dell Comics.

== Plot ==
A group of young people do a course in horsemanship in England.

== Cast ==
- Annette Funicello as Dinah Wilcox
- Tommy Kirk as Danny Grant
- Janet Munro as Janet Hale
- Tony Britton as Major George Brooke
- John Fraser as David Lawford
- Donald Pleasence as Captain Pinski
- Harry Lockart as Vincenzo Lalli
- Colin Gordon as Mr. Ffolliott
- Anthony Nicholls as Hardy Cole
- Jean Marsh as Andrienne
- Lisa Madron as Ingrid
- Penelope Horner as Penny
- Millicent Martin as Joan

== Production ==
It was based on a 1957 novel by Don Stanford. Film rights were bought by Walt Disney, who authorised a television film version to be shot in England. Disney made a number of films in England around this time, including Greyfriars Bobby and The Prince and the Pauper. The studio was producing television films in Europe, including the Netherlands (Hans Brinker), Austria (The Magnificent Rebel), Mexico (Sancho, the Homing Steer), the American northwest (A Fire Called Jeremiah) and Italy (Escapade in Florence).

In August 1960 Annette Funicello and Tommy Kirk were cast. It was Funicello's first co-starring role in a feature.

The musical number, "Strummin' Song", performed by Annette Funicello and written by the Sherman Brothers marked the first song the Sherman Brothers ever wrote for a Disney project. (Although they had written songs for Annette Funicello previously.) It led to them being hired to write a song for The Parent Trap.

The film was shot on location in England. Filming started September 1960. Funicello and Kirk were sent to England several weeks before filming started to practise their riding.

It was the last of four films Janet Munro made for Disney. Filmink noted she "played a grumpier character than usual."

Funicello says during filming married members of crew would have affairs with the cast, and at times the director "would refer to me dismissively as 'the Disney girl' and make unflattering comments about me. Of course he was not the first and would not be the last to take a dislike to me because he felt I was Mr Disney's 'pet'."

Freddie Francis worked on the film at the request of William Fairchild (the two men had worked together on Outcasts of the Island). Francis called it "probably the worst film I've ever done, it really was... I don't know how to describe it, it was absolutely mad. I don't think anybody really believed in the film... any time anybody mentions Horsemasters we just fall about. But we did have a wonderful time. Unbelievable."

== Comic book adaptation ==
- Dell Four Color #1260 (December 1961-February 1962)

== Home media ==
The Horsemasters was released on VHS by Walt Disney Home Video in early 1986 as part of "Annette Month", a promotion featuring five films starring Annette Funicello.

== See also ==
- List of films about horses
