= My Name Is Legend =

1975 American Western film

My Name Is Legend is a 1975 American Western film. It starred Tommy Kirk, who later called it "a cowboy thing that was so bad it was never released."

It was written and directed by Duke Kelly, who had previously made Ride the Hot Wind (1971) with Kirk.

== Plot ==
In the 1880s, seven men rob and destroy a small Western cattle town, then flee for their lives.

== Cast ==
- Tommy Kirk
- Rand Porter
- Stan Foster
- Scott Kelly
- Roberta Eaton
- Kerry Smith

== Production ==
During filming, Kirk flew head over heels off his horse and fell into an unexpected man-made ravine. "I fell at least 12 feet and landed flat on my back in the bottom of this ravine," Kirk said. "I landed in the one strip that was filled with soft mud; it was like landing on a feather pillow. Why I wasn't killed, I don't know.

Principal photography took place in Kansas, at Quincy and Medicine Lodge.

== Release ==
The film opened in northwestern Kansas in July 1975.
