= Didn't You Hear? =

1970 fantasy film by Skip Sherwood

- 1983 VHS cover art
- Directed by: Skip Sherwood
- Screenplay by: Karl Krogstad; Mike Mickler; Skip Sherwood; Joanne Tilton
- Story by: Karl Krogstad; Joanne Tilton
- Produced by: Skip Sherwood
- Starring: Dennis Christopher; Gary Busey; Cheryl Waters
- Cinematography: Karl Krogstad
- Edited by: Donald W. Ernst
- Music by: Mort Garson
- Release dates: December 16, 1970 (Seattle); February 24, 1971 (Bremerton, Washington)
- Running time: 92 minutes
- Country: United States
- Language: English

Didn't You Hear? is a 1970 independent psychedelic drama-fantasy film directed, co-written, and produced by Skip Sherwood. The film was co-written by Karl Krogstad, Joanne Tilton, and Mike Mickler—the latter of whom also co-starred in the film, alongside lead Dennis Christopher, Gary Busey, and Cheryl Waters, among others. Musician Mort Garson composed the film with all electronic music, primarily utilizing the Moog synthesizer. He also released an album with the same name.

The film never achieved wide release, but eventually prompted a 1985 VHS, which exists on the Internet Archive for free. (See below.)

== Plot summary ==
Kevin is despondent and walking through a hazy reality within college life. He sleeps through lectures and does not want to participate in any fraternity/sorority shenanigans. Instead, Kevin prefers to drift in and out of his escapist fantasy world, where he imagines himself and his friends as pirates sailing and exploring an uninhabitated island.

== Cast ==
- Dennis Christopher as Kevin
- Gary Busey as James a.k.a. "Sparrow"
- Cheryl Waters as Paige
- Tony Mumolo as Knight
- John Kauffmann as Steve
- Terence O'Brien as Peter
- Jack Kosslyn as Higby
- Mike Mickler as Virgil (also co-screenwriter)
- John Rice as Crosley
- Judy Nagle as Judy
- James Farren as Ian
- Scott McBreen as Jeff
- Pam Sherwood as Pam
- Katy Coyle as Katy
- Cindy Bledsoe as Cindy

== Production ==
=== Music ===
Pioneering musician Mort Garson released an album simultaneously with the film, which was the first to ever be scored entirely electronically. The title song (of both album and film), "Didn't You Hear? (feat. Tom Muncrief)" was released as a single with mild success. The film was also the first ever to feature the use of a Moog synthesizer.

=== Distribution ===
The film was considered a lost film for some years. During its initial premiere in Seattle, Washington, there were several snowstorms which affected cinema attendance. After a mild showing, it re-premiered the following year in scattered other Washington cities. Skip Sherwood Productions, Inc. revived the film around 1983, and it began to develop a cult following, albeit growing stronger due to its inaccessibility. In 1985, a VHS was released, after which it faded back into obscurity.

There also exists an Italian version of this film, with Italian actors dubbing over the dialogue. It is unclear when that was released.

== Reception ==
RareFilmm: The Cave of Forgotten Films rates it 4½ stars out of 5. Film critic John Hartl from The Seattle Times chastised its "sophomoric philosophizing", but stated that Sherwood's direction captures nice visuals, which are "sabotaged by the screenplay".
