= Annette Funicello =

American actress and singer (1942–2013)

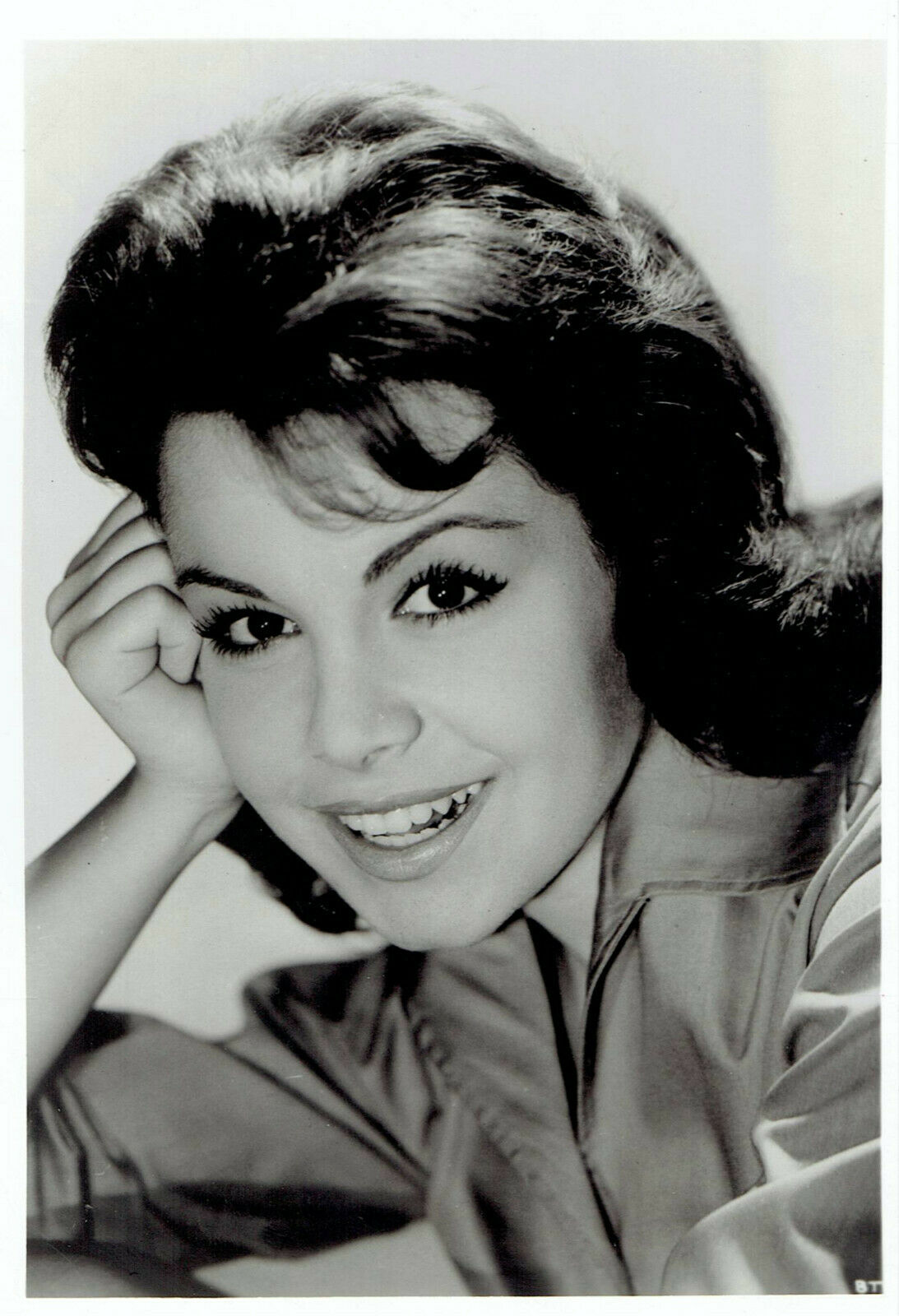
- Funicello in 1962
- Born: Annette Joanne Funicello; October 22, 1942; Utica, New York, U.S.
- Died: April 8, 2013 (aged 70); Bakersfield, California, U.S.
- Occupations: Actress; singer
- Years active: 1954–1998
- Spouses: Jack L. Gilardi (m. 1965; div. 1981) Glen D. Holt (m. 1986)
- Children: 3
- Awards: Hollywood Walk of Fame

Annette Joanne Funicello (Italian: [funiˈtʃɛllo]; October 22, 1942 – April 8, 2013) was an American actress and singer. She began her professional career at age 12, becoming one of the most popular Mouseketeers on the original Mickey Mouse Club. In her teenage years, Funicello had a successful career as a pop singer recording under the name "Annette". Her most notable singles are "O Dio Mio", "First Name Initial", "Tall Paul", and "Pineapple Princess". During the mid-1960s, she established herself as a film actress, popularizing the successful "Beach Party" genre alongside co-star Frankie Avalon.

In 1992, Funicello announced that she had been diagnosed with multiple sclerosis. She died of complications from the disease on April 8, 2013.

== Early life ==
Annette Joanne Funicello was born in Utica, New York, to Virginia Jeanne (née Albano), and Joseph Edward Funicello. Her family moved to Southern California when she was four years old. She was of Italian American heritage.

== Career ==
=== The Mickey Mouse Club ===
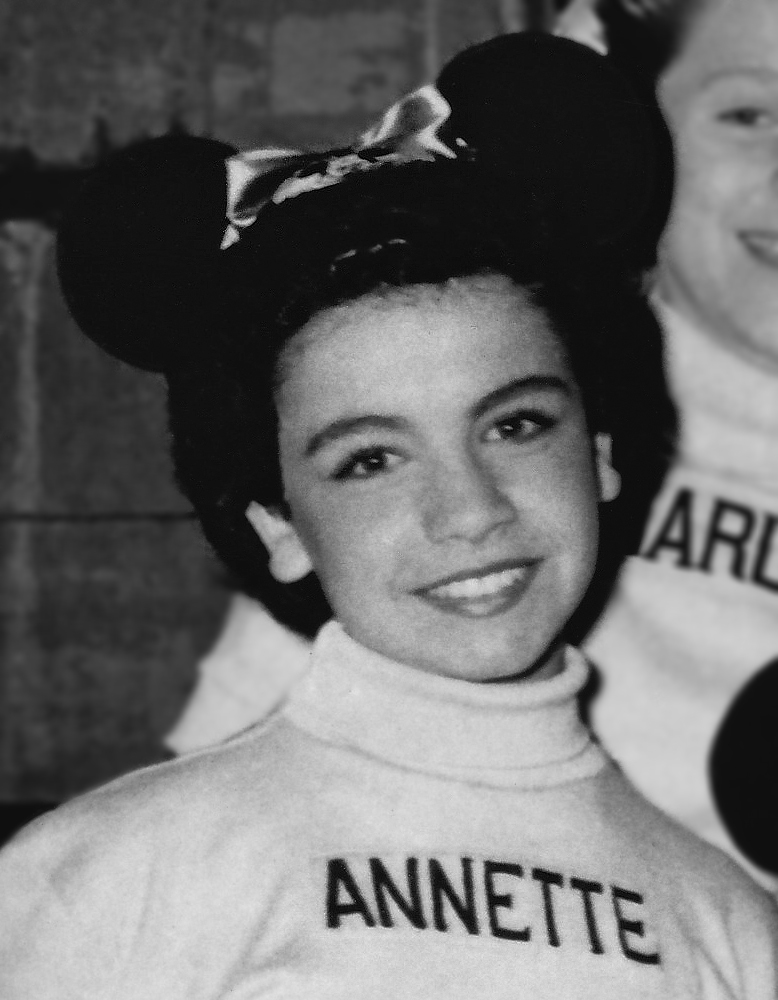
Funicello as a Mouseketeer on The Mickey Mouse Club (1956)

Funicello took dancing and music lessons when she was a child in order to overcome her shyness. In 1955, the 12-year-old was discovered by Walt Disney when she performed as the Swan Queen in Swan Lake at a dance recital at the Starlight Bowl in Burbank, California. Disney cast her as one of the original Mouseketeers. She was the last to be selected, and one of the few cast members to be personally selected by Walt Disney himself.

In 1955, she signed a seven-year contract with Disney at $160 a week that would rise to $500 a week if all options were exercised.

Funicello proved to be very popular and by the end of the first season of The Mickey Mouse Club, she was receiving 6,000 letters a month, more than any other Mouseketeer. She dated fellow Mouseketeer Lonnie Burr. Saying goodbye to cast members in the 1959 show finale, Funicello said "I never cried so hard in my life".

In addition to appearing in many Mouseketeer sketches and dance routines, Funicello starred in several serials on The Mickey Mouse Club. These included Adventure in Dairyland, the second and third Spin and Marty serials – The Further Adventures of Spin and Marty (1956) and The New Adventures of Spin and Marty (1957) – and Walt Disney Presents: Annette (1958) (which co-starred Richard Deacon).

=== Singing career ===
In several scenes in the Annette serial, she performed the song that launched her singing career. The studio received so much mail about "How Will I Know My Love" (lyrics by Tom Adair, music by Frances Jeffords and William Walsh), that Walt Disney issued it as a single, and gave Funicello (somewhat unwillingly) a recording contract.

A proposed live-action feature, The Rainbow Road to Oz, was to have starred some of the Mouseketeers, including Darlene Gillespie as Dorothy and Funicello as Ozma. Preview segments from the film aired on September 11, 1957, on Disneyland's fourth anniversary show. By then, MGM's The Wizard of Oz had been shown on CBS Television for the first time. Theories on why the film was abandoned include Disney's failure to develop a satisfactory script and the positive reception of the MGM film's television screening. Disney ultimately replaced this film project with a new adaptation of Babes in Toyland (1961), which starred Funicello as Mary Contrary.

=== Post-Mickey Mouse Club ===
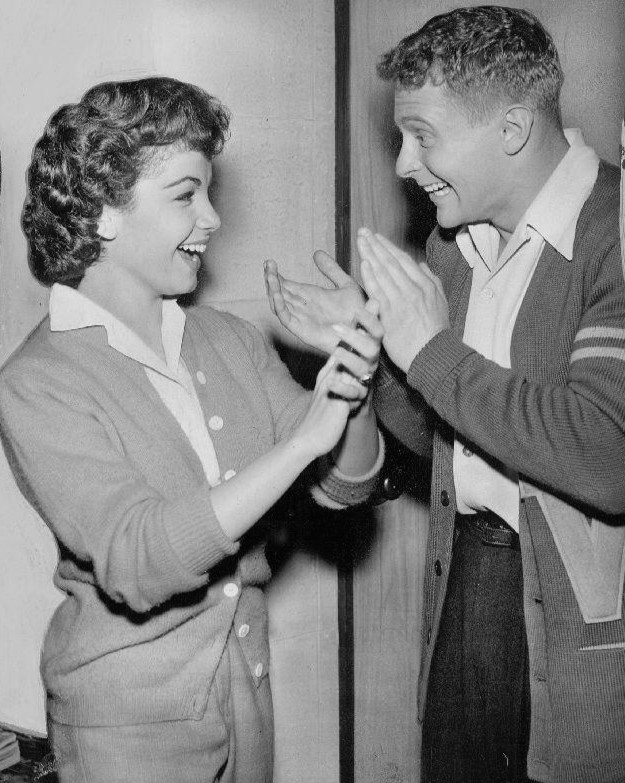
Funicello and Richard Tyler on The Danny Thomas Show (1959)

After the Mickey Mouse Club, Funicello remained under contract with Disney for a time. She had a role on the Disney television series Zorro, playing Anita Cabrillo in a three-episode storyline about a teen-aged girl arriving in Los Angeles to visit a father who does not seem to exist to the citizens there. This role was reportedly a 16th birthday present from Walt Disney, and it was the first of two characters she played opposite Guy Williams as Zorro, on whom Funicello had developed a crush. She had a multiple-episode guest arc on The Danny Thomas Show as an Italian exchange student.

Funicello made her feature film debut in the Disney-produced comedy The Shaggy Dog (1959) with Fred MacMurray and Tommy Kirk. The film was a success at the box-office.

Although uncomfortable being thought of as a singer, Funicello had a number of pop record hits in the late 1950s and early 1960s, mostly written by the Sherman Brothers and including: "Tall Paul", "First Name Initial", "O Dio Mio", "Train of Love" (written by Paul Anka) and "Pineapple Princess". They were released by Disney's Buena Vista label. She also recorded "It's Really Love" in 1959, a reworking of an earlier Paul Anka song called "Toot Sweet" (which was later reworked again into Johnny's Theme for The Tonight Show Starring Johnny Carson).

In an episode of the Disney anthology television series titled "Disneyland After Dark", Funicello can be seen singing live at Disneyland. Walt Disney was reportedly a fan of 1950s pop star Teresa Brewer and tried to pattern Funicello's singing on the same style. However, Funicello credits "the Annette sound" to her record producer, Tutti Camarata, who worked for Disney in that era. Camarata had her double-track her vocals, matching her first track as closely as possible on the second recording to achieve a fuller sound than her voice would otherwise produce. Early in her career, she appeared on the NBC interview program Here's Hollywood.

In December 1959, Funicello attempted to have her contract with Disney set aside, claiming that it was unequitable and that she was without an agent or legal counsel when she signed it. She was receiving $325 a week (About $3,000 in 2020 dollars). The court refused.

=== Return to Disney ===
In 1961, Funicello returned to Zorro playing a different role. She starred in a big budget musical for Disney, Babes in Toyland (1961), alongside Tommy Sands and Kirk. She also appeared in two television movies filmed in Europe for Disney alongside Kirk, both of which were released theatrically in some markets: The Horsemasters (1961), shot in England, and Escapade in Florence (1962), filmed in Italy. It has been pointed out that although Disney had Funicello under contract a long time "he never seemed to have much faith in her abilities to carry a film (she usually supported the boy)."

=== Beach party series ===
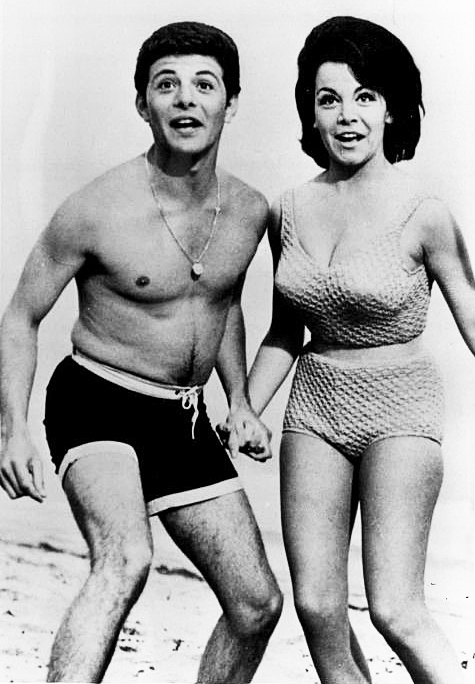
Funicello and Frankie Avalon at the height of the Beach Party era

Funicello moved on from Disney to become a "teen idol", starring in a series of "Beach Party" movies with Frankie Avalon for American International Pictures. These started with Beach Party (1963) when Funicello was 21 years old. The movie was so successful American International Pictures signed Funicello to a seven-year contract and starred her in a series of beach party movies.

Funicello guest-starred on episodes of Wagon Train, Burke's Law and The Greatest Show on Earth; she then starred in another two-part Disney telemovie with Kirk, The Misadventures of Merlin Jones (1964). This was released to cinemas in the US and became a surprise box office hit. The follow ups to Beach Party, Muscle Beach Party (1964) and Bikini Beach (1964) were also popular.

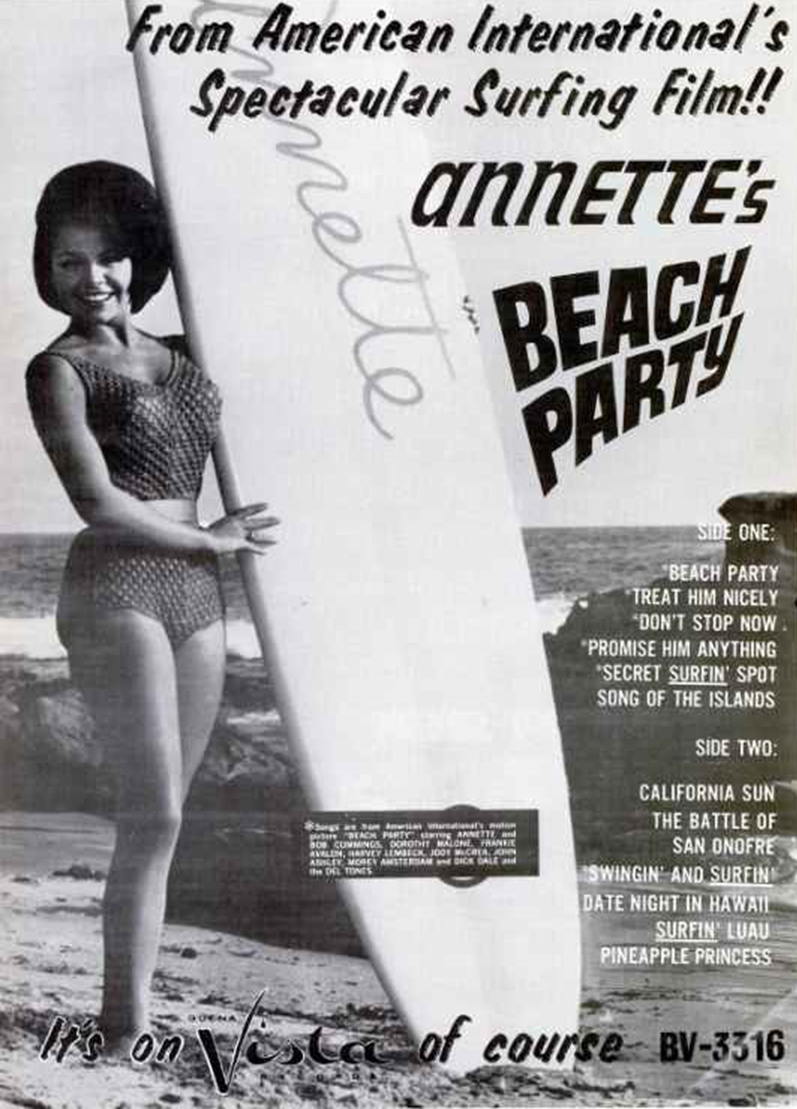
Billboard advertisement for Annette's Beach Party, July 20, 1963

When she was cast in her first beach movie, Walt Disney requested that she wear only modest bathing suits and keep her navel covered. However, she wore a pink two-piece in Beach Party, a white two-piece fishnet suit in the second film (Muscle Beach Party), and a blue and white bikini in the third (Bikini Beach). All three swimsuits bared her navel, particularly in Bikini Beach, where it is visible extensively during close-up shots in a sequence early in the film when she meets Frankie Avalon's "Potato Bug" character outside his tent.

Funicello made Pajama Party (1964) for AIP with Kirk, not Avalon, though it was an unofficial Beach Party movie, and Avalon made a cameo. Avalon was back as Funicello's co-star in Beach Blanket Bingo (1965); she and Kirk then did a sequel to Merlin Jones, The Monkey's Uncle (1965). The Monkey's Uncle featured Annette singing with The Beach Boys and was another huge hit.

Funicello made a cameo in two AIP comedies starring Avalon, Ski Party (1965) and Dr Goldfoot and the Bikini Machine (1965). Following these, she filmed How to Stuff a Wild Bikini (1965) with Dwayne Hickman. Box office receipts for the series were in decline, and neither Avalon nor Funicello appeared in the final installment, The Ghost in the Invisible Bikini (1966).

=== Stock-car racing films ===
AIP tried a new formula with stock car racing films, starting with Fireball 500 (1966) which starred Funicello, Avalon and Fabian Forte. The movie was popular enough for them to try another stock car movie, Thunder Alley (1967) with Funicello and Fabian. It would be her last lead in a feature film for two decades.

Funicello guest starred on Hondo and had a short role in Head (1968), opposite The Monkees.

=== 1970s and 1980s ===
During the 1970s, Funicello focused on raising her family. However she still occasionally acted, making guest appearances on shows like Love, American Style, Easy Does It... Starring Frankie Avalon, Fantasy Island and The Love Boat.

In 1979, Funicello began starring in a series of television commercials for Skippy peanut butter. Her role as spokesperson for the brand forced Funicello to turn down a role in Grease 2. In November 1985, she starred in the 16th episode of the Disney Channel documentary series Disney Family Album in an episode about her career.

She starred in a TV movie for Disney, Lots of Luck (1985), and was reunited with Avalon in Back to the Beach (1987). The two also performed together live.

=== Later career ===
Funicello's autobiography, A Dream Is a Wish Your Heart Makes: My Story, was dictated to Patricia Romanowski and published in 1994. The title was taken from a song from the Disney movie Cinderella. A television film based on the book, A Dream Is a Wish Your Heart Makes: The Annette Funicello Story, appeared in 1995. In the final scene, the actress portraying Funicello (Eva LaRue), using a wheelchair, turns away from the camera and when turning back, Funicello herself appears to deliver a message to a group of children.

During this period, Funicello produced a line of teddy bears for the Annette Funicello Collectible Bear Company. The last collection in the series was made in 2004. She also had her own fragrance called "Cello, by Annette".

"Now that I've gone public with my illness, they can't do enough," she said in 1994. "They even send me home remedies to try. Everyone says, 'God bless you and I'm praying for you.'"

Funicello made her final public appearance on September 13, 1998 at California's Multiple Sclerosis Society with Frankie Avalon.

== Personal life ==
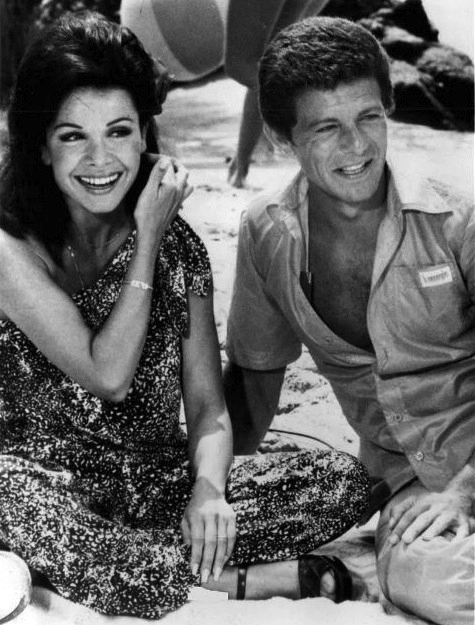
Funicello and Frankie Avalon reunited for the television special Good Ol' Days, 1977

Funicello's best friend was actress and singer Shelley Fabares, whom she had met in a catechism class when they were teens. Fabares was a bridesmaid at Funicello's first wedding. Funicello was also very close to fellow Mouseketeers Lonnie Burr (her first boyfriend), Sharon Baird, Doreen Tracey, Cheryl Holdridge, Disney co-star Tommy Kirk and beach-movie co-star Frankie Avalon. She dated Canadian singer/songwriter Paul Anka and he wrote his hit song "Puppy Love" about her.

=== Marriages and children ===
Funicello was married to Jack L. Gilardi (1930–2019) from 1965 until 1981. They had three children: Gina Portman (born 1965), Jack Jr. (born 1970) and Jason (born 1974). In 1986, she married Glen D. Holt (1930–2018), a trainer and breeder of horses. The couple was frequently seen attending harness racing events at the Los Alamitos Race Course and Fairplex in Pomona during the 1980s and 1990s.

In March 2011, Funicello's longtime home in Encino, California, caught fire. She suffered smoke inhalation, but was otherwise unharmed. After the fire, Funicello and Holt lived in a modest ranch that they had purchased decades earlier, located just south of Shafter, California (north of Bakersfield), where she lived her remaining years.

=== Illness and death ===
In early 1987, when she was 44 years old, Funicello reunited with Frankie Avalon and Dick Clark for a series of promotional concerts to promote their film Back to the Beach. She began to experience dizziness, headaches, and balance issues and she was diagnosed with multiple sclerosis. Her final cameo appearance on a TV series was on the sitcom Full House in 1991, where the set and her scenes had to be subtly adapted due to her balance problems. Funicello hid her condition from her family and friends until 1992, when she finally publicly disclosed her diagnosis to dispel rumors that her impaired ability to walk was the result of alcoholism. In 1993, she opened the Annette Funicello Fund for Neurological Disorders at the California Community Foundation.

The Canadian program W5 profiled Funicello in 2012 after she had been out of the public eye for 15 years, revealing that her disease had severely damaged her nervous system. She had lost the ability to walk in 2004, she had lost the ability to speak half a decade later in 2009 and she required a feeding tube, needing round-the-clock care in order to survive. Funicello's close friend Shelley Fabares also appeared in the profile piece. Alan Osmond, a friend of Funicello's who likewise was diagnosed with multiple sclerosis in the late 1980s, remarked that Funicello had fallen into deep despair following the diagnosis (she had told him "It’s not the disease that gets you down, it’s the lack of hope"), which Osmond suspected contributed to her more rapid decline compared to Osmond's.

On April 8, 2013, Funicello died at the age of 70 at Mercy Southwest Hospital in Bakersfield, California, from complications which were attributed to multiple sclerosis. Her family and Fabares were with her when she died. A private funeral was held at the Cherished Memories Memorial Chapel in Bakersfield. Commenting on her death, Walt Disney Company chairman and CEO Bob Iger said:

Annette was and always will be a cherished member of the Disney family, synonymous with the word Mouseketeer, and a true Disney Legend. She will forever hold a place in our hearts as one of Walt Disney's brightest stars, delighting an entire generation of baby boomers with her jubilant personality and endless talent. Annette was well known for being as beautiful inside as she was on the outside, and she faced her physical challenges with dignity, bravery and grace. All of us at Disney join with family, friends and fans around the world in celebrating her extraordinary life.

== Legacy ==
The power pop band Redd Kross's 1980 song "Annette's Got The Hits" was inspired by Funicello.

In 1992, Funicello was inducted as a Disney Legend. She received a star on the Hollywood Walk of Fame for motion pictures on September 14, 1993; it is located at 6834 Hollywood Blvd. In 1995, she appeared on a Disney TV documentary commemorating the 40th anniversary of The Mickey Mouse Club.

== Discography ==
=== Albums ===
Numbers in parentheses after title indicate peak position in Billboard charts.

- Annette – Vista BV-3301 (Mono) (1959)
- Annette Sings Anka (#21) – Vista BV-3302 (Mono) (1960)
- Hawaiiannette (#38) – Vista BV-3303 (Mono) (1960)
- Italiannette – Vista BV-3304 (Mono) (1960)
- Dance Annette – Vista BV-3305 (Mono) (1961)
- The Story of My Teens – Vista BV-3312 (Mono) (1962)
- Annette's Beach Party (#39) – Vista BV-3316 (Mono), STER-3316 (Stereo) (July 1963)
- Muscle Beach Party – Vista BV-3314 (Mono), STER-3314 (Stereo) (April 1964)
- Annette on Campus – Vista BV-3320 (Mono), STER-3320 (Stereo) (1964)
- Annette at Bikini Beach – Vista BV-3324 (Mono), STER-3324 (Stereo) (September 1964)
- Pajama Party – Vista BV-3325 (Mono), STER-3325 (Stereo) (November 1964)
- Something Borrowed Something Blue – Vista BV-3328 (Mono), STER-3328 (Stereo) (1964)
- Annette Sings Golden Surfin' Hits – Vista BV-3327 (Mono), STER-3327 (Stereo) (July 1965)
- Annette Funicello – Vista BV-4037 (1972)
- Annette Funicello Country Album – Starview 4001 (1984)
- Best of Annette – Rhino RNDF-206 (1984) (also released as a picture disk on Rhino RNLP-702)
- Annette: A Musical Reunion with America's Girl-Next-Door – Vista 60010 (1993)
- A Dream Is a Wish Your Heart Makes – Time/Warner 520564 (April 16, 1995)
- The Best of Annette – Vista (August 14, 1991)
- A Tribute to Walt Disney – Promised Land – Glanco Music (2013)

=== Singles ===
Year	Titles (A-side, B-side) Both sides from same album except where indicated	Record Label	Peak chart positions			Album
Year	Titles (A-side, B-side) Both sides from same album except where indicated	Record Label	US Billboard	US Cashbox	CAN CHUM	Album
1958	"How Will I Know My Love" b/w "Don't Jump to Conclusions"	Disneyland 102	—	55	41	Annette
1958	"That Crazy Place from Outer Space" b/w "Gold Doubloons and Pieces of Eight" (Non-album track)	Disneyland 114	—	—	—	Annette
1959	"Tall Paul" b/w "Ma, He's Making Eyes at Me"	Disneyland 118	7	18	6	Annette
1959	"Jo Jo the Dog Faced Boy"; Original B-side: "Lonely Guitar"; Later B-side: "Love Me Forever"	Vista 336	73	59	33	Annette
1959	"Lonely Guitar" / "Wild Willie"; Multiple releases with each title as A-side	Vista 339	50	51	41	Annette
1959	"Especially for You" b/w "My Heart Became of Age"	Vista 344	—	—	—	Annette
1959	"First Name Initial" / "My Heart Became of Age" (from Annette)	Vista 349	20; 74	16 —	16	The Story of My Teens
1960	"O Dio Mio" b/w "It Took Dreams" (from Annette)	Vista 354	10	13	20	The Story of My Teens
1960	"Train of Love" b/w "Tell Me Who's the Girl" (from The Story of My Teens)	Vista 359	36	47	13	Annette Sings Anka
1960	"Pineapple Princess" b/w "Luau Cha Cha Cha"	Vista 362	11	15	13	Hawaiiannette
1960	"Talk to Me Baby" b/w "I Love You Baby"	Vista 369	92	98	—	Annette Sings Anka
1961	"Dream Boy" b/w "Please Please Signore"	Vista 374	87	—	—	Italiannette
1961	"Indian Giver" b/w "Mama Mama Rosa (Where's the Spumoni)" (from Italiannette)	Vista 375	—	—	—	Non-album track
1961	"Blue Muu Muu" b/w "Hawaiian Love Talk" (Non-album track)	Vista 384	107	—	—	Hawaiiannette
1961	"Dreamin' About You" b/w "Strummin' Song" (from The Story of My Teens)	Vista 388	106	—	—	Non-album track
1962	"That Crazy Place from Outer Space" b/w "Seven Moons (Of Batalyre)" (by Danny Saval and Tom Tyron, non-album track)	Vista 392	—	—	—	Annette
1962	"The Truth About Youth" b/w "I Can't Do the Sum"	Vista 394	—	—	—	The Story of My Teens
1962	"My Little Grass Shack" b/w "Hukilau"	Vista 400	—	—	—	Hawaiiannette
1962	"He's My Ideal" b/w "Mister Piano Man" (from The Story of My Teens)	Vista 405	—	—	—	Non-album tracks
1962	"Bella Bella Florence" b/w "Canzone d'Amoure"	Vista 407	—	—	—	Non-album tracks
1962	"Teenage Wedding" b/w "Walkin' and Talkin'"	Vista 414	—	—	—	Non-album tracks
1963	"Promise Me Anything" b/w "Treat Him Nicely"	Vista 427	123	—	—	Annette's Beach Party
1964	"Merlin Jones" (with The Wellingtons) b/w "The Scrambled Egghead" (with Tommy Kirk)	Vista 431	—	—	—	Muscle Beach Party
1964	"Custom City" b/w "Rebel Rider"	Vista 432	—	—	—	Muscle Beach Party
1964	"Muscle Beach Party" b/w "I Dream About Frankie"	Vista 433	—	—	—	Muscle Beach Party
1964	"Bikini Beach Party" b/w "The Clyde"	Vista 436	—	—	—	Annette at Bikini Beach
1964	"The Wah-Watusi" b/w "The Clyde"	Vista 437	—	—	—	Annette at Bikini Beach
1965	"Something Borrowed, Something Blue" b/w "How Will I Know My Love" (New version of Annette's 1958 recording)	Vista 438	—	—	—	Something Borrowed, Something Blue
1965	"The Monkey's Uncle" (With The Beach Boys) b/w "How Will I Know My Love" (from Something Borrowed, Something Blue)	Vista 440	—	—	—	Annette at Bikini Beach
1965	"Boy to Love" b/w "No One Else Could Be Prouder"	Vista 442	—	—	—	Golden Surfin' Hits
1966	"No Way to Go but Up" b/w "Crystal Ball" (from Something Borrowed, Something Blue)	Vista 450	—	—	—	Non-album track
1967	"What's a Girl to Do" b/w "When You Get What You Want" (Annette's name is misspelled on both sides as "Annettte")	Tower 326	—	—	—	Thunder Alley (Soundtrack)
1981	"(Together We Can Make A) Merry Christmas" b/w "The Night Before Christmas" (Duets with Frankie Avalon)	Pacific Star 569	—	—	—	Non-album tracks
1983	"The Promised Land" b/w "In Between and Out of Love"	Starview 3001	—	—	—	Country Album

== Filmography ==
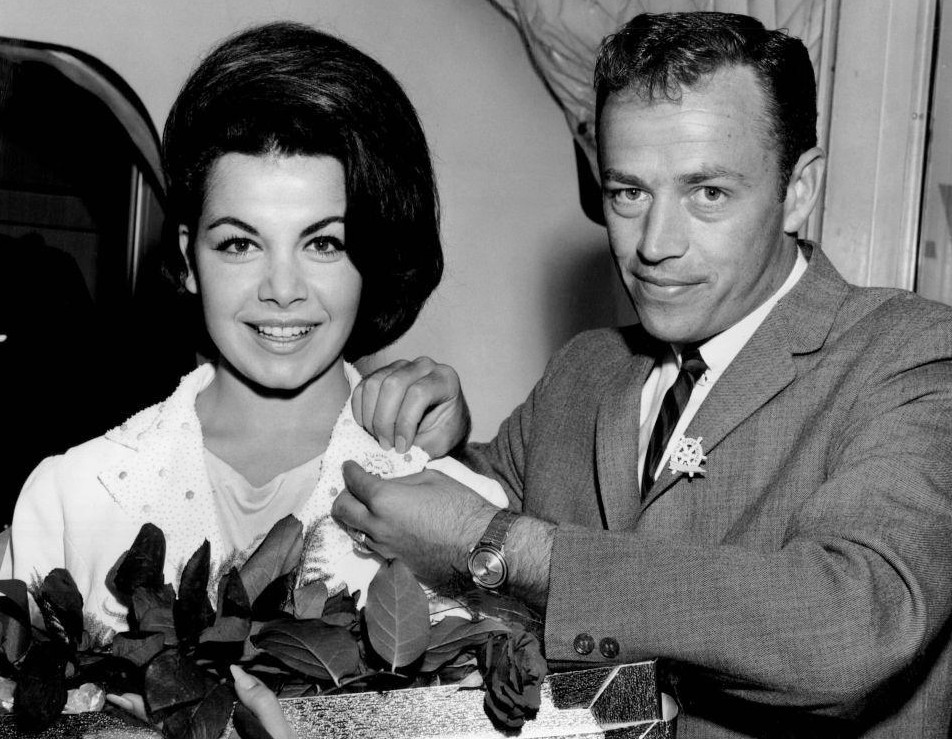
Funicello as a participant in Seattle Seafair's Torchlight Parade, 1963

- There's No Business Like Show Business (1954, Cameo) – Laughing Girl (uncredited)
- The Shaggy Dog (1959) – Allison D'Allessio
- Babes in Toyland (1961) – Mary Quite Contrary
- Beach Party (1963) – Dolores
- The Misadventures of Merlin Jones (1964) – Jennifer
- Muscle Beach Party (1964) – Dee Dee
- Bikini Beach (1964) – Dee Dee
- Pajama Party (1964) – Connie
- Beach Blanket Bingo (1965) – Dee Dee
- The Monkey's Uncle (1965) – Jennifer
- Ski Party (1965, Cameo) – Prof. Sonya Roberts (uncredited)
- How to Stuff a Wild Bikini (1965) – Dee Dee
- Dr. Goldfoot and the Bikini Machine (1965, cameo) – Girl in Dungeon
- Fireball 500 (1966) – Jane Harris
- Thunder Alley (1967) – Francie Madsen
- Head (1968) – Minnie
- Back to the Beach (1987) – Annette
- Troop Beverly Hills (1989, cameo)

== Television work ==
- Mickey Mouse Club (1955–1959; 1977; 1980; 1990; 1993)
- Elfego Baca: Six Gun Law (1959) (compilation of episodes from Wonderful World of Color serial) – Chiquita Bernal
- The Danny Thomas Show (cast member in 1959) – Gina Minelli
- Zorro (1959–1961) – Anita Cabrillo / Constancia de la Torre
- The Horsemasters (1962) – Dinah Wilcox
- Escapade in Florence (1962) – Annette Aliotto
- Burke's Law (1963–1965) – Anna Najensky / Dorrie Marsh
- Wagon Train (1963, Episode: "The Sam Pulaski Story") – Rose Pulaski
- The Greatest Show on Earth (1964, Episode: "Rosetta") – Melanie Keller
- Hondo (1967, episode "Hondo and the Apache Trail")
- Love, American Style segment "Love and the Tuba" (with Frankie Avalon, 1971) – Millie
- Easy Does It... Starring Frankie Avalon (1976, four-week summer variety series)
- Frankie and Annette: The Second Time Around (1978, TV movie) (unsold pilot) – Annette
- Fantasy Island episode "Ghostbreaker" (1978)
- The Mouseketeer Reunion (November 23, 1980)
- The Love Boat (1982)
- Lots of Luck (1985; TV movie)
- Growing Pains episode "The Seavers and the Cleavers" (guest star, 1985)
- Pee-wee's Playhouse Christmas Special (guest star, 1988)
- Full House episode "Joey Goes Hollywood" (guest star with Frankie Avalon, March 29, 1991)
- A Dream Is a Wish Your Heart Makes: The Annette Funicello Story (1995; TV movie) – Annette Funicello (final film role)
- The Mickey Mouse Club Story (1995; documentary)

== Books ==
- Funicello, Annette and Patricia Romanowski. A Dream is a Wish Your Heart Makes: My Story 1994, ISBN 0-7868-8092-9
- The Annette Mysteries: Includes The Desert Inn Mystery, The Mystery at Moonstone Bay, The Mystery at Smugglers' Cove, Mystery of Medicine Wheel and Sierra Summer
