= Streets of Death =

- Directed by: Jeff Hathcock
- Written by: Jeff Hathcock
- Produced by: Jeff Hathcock
- Starring: Tommy Kirk
- Distributed by: Video Features
- Release date: 1988
- Country: United States
- Language: English

Streets of Death is a 1988 American film directed by Jeff Hathcock.

== Premise ==
Prostitutes are being killed all over the place, their bodies dumped in various parts of the city. Officer Kelly Anderson goes undercover as a prostitute to solve the case with the help of Detective Grant Jordan.

== Cast ==
- Tommy Kirk as Frank Phillips
- Larry Thomas as Artie Benson
- Lawrence Scott as Det. Grant Jordan
- Susanne Smith as Kelly Anderson
- Simon de Soto as Lt. Bernie Navarre
- Guy Ecker as Lenny Miller

== Production ==
Tommy Kirk had retired from acting when the film was made but the producer made him an offer "that was hard to refuse." He was the only professional actor in the cast.

The film had some problems.... I played a cop who has been kicked off the force because he was a drunk and had accidentally killed somebody. But he wanted to be back on the force, to be a cop again, so he goes off on his own and tries to solve this string of serial killings in the Los Angeles suburbs... That picture was a good example of a case of good intentions.
