= Macon County Line =

1974 American independent film directed by Richard Compton

- Theatrical release poster
- Directed by: Richard Compton
- Written by: Max Baer Jr. Richard Compton
- Produced by: Max Baer Jr. Roger Camras (executive producer); Richard Franchot (associate producer)
- Starring: Alan Vint; Jesse Vint; Cheryl Waters; Max Baer Jr. Geoffrey Lewis; Joan Blackman; Leif Garrett; James Gammon; Timothy Scott; Sam Gilman
- Cinematography: Daniel Lacambre
- Edited by: Tina Hirsch
- Music by: Stu Phillips
- Distributed by: American International Pictures
- Release date: August 8, 1974
- Running time: 89 minutes
- Country: United States
- Language: English
- Budget: $225,000
- Box office: $30 million $9.1 million

Macon County Line is a 1974 American independent Southern Gothic crime thriller film directed by Richard Compton who cowrote the film's screenplay with Max Baer Jr. basing it on the real life murder of a woman in rural Macon County, Tennessee, and the actions of retribution taken by community members against three young people who were falsely accused of the crime.

The $225,000 film reportedly became the most profitable film of 1974 (in cost-to-gross ratio), earning $18.8 million in North America and over $30 million worldwide.

== Plot ==
In 1954 Macon County, Georgia, brothers Chris (Alan Vint) and Wayne Dixon (Jesse Vint) from Chicago are on a two-week spree of cheap thrills throughout the South before their upcoming stint in the Air Force. Wayne entered the service when Chris was given the option of military duty in lieu of prison as the result of an earlier episode with the law. Driving through Louisiana, the brothers pick up hitchhiker Jenny Scott (Cheryl Waters), a pretty blond with a shady backstory that she would rather not discuss.

Meanwhile, local backwater town sheriff Reed Morgan (Baer) is preparing to bring his son Luke (Leif Garrett) home from military school. Hunting season begins the next day and he buys Luke a new shotgun. When Chris, Jenny and Wayne experience car trouble, they must wait in Sheriff Morgan's town. Unable to repair the car themselves, they scrape together enough money to get it patched up by garage owner Hamp (Geoffrey Lewis).

Waiting at the garage, they are informally threatened by Morgan, who says they could be picked up for vagrancy if they decide to stick around. Not interested in trouble, the brothers and Jenny head out once their car is running, but after another breakdown, they take refuge in Morgan's barn. Inside the house, Morgan's wife is brutally raped and murdered by two men who then kill a cop when pulled over. When Morgan returns home to find his wife dead, he pursues Chris, Wayne and Jenny, believing they must have been responsible. There is a running firefight during the chase.

With Wayne and Jenny holed up in a boat hiding from Morgan, Chris sneaks out to try to start the boat's motor. A gunshot is heard, and Wayne and Jenny fear that Chris has been killed. Young Luke Morgan then enters the boat's cabin and shoots Wayne and Jenny. It is revealed that Morgan was killed during the firefight. Afterwards, a wounded Chris comes back to the boat to find his friends killed, and Luke being held by another policeman. The last scene is Chris in his car, finally repaired by Hamp, with the locals and police then watching him leave. The epilogue shows that Chris became a master sergeant in the Air Force, with a wife and three children. Luke spent the rest of his life in a mental hospital.

== Production notes ==
While the poster advertising the film included the tagline "It shouldn't have happened. It couldn't have happened. But it did," and the title card states that it is a true story (and several reviewers have stated the same), director Richard Compton and producer Max Baer have said that they wrote the original story without any basis in historic events. The film is one of several so-called "drive-in" films that were presented as true stories (à la 1972's The Legend of Boggy Creek, 1974's The Texas Chain Saw Massacre, and 1976's Jackson County Jail and The Town That Dreaded Sundown). In each case, most, if not all, of what was portrayed on screen was fictional (with the exception of The Town That Dreaded Sundown, which was inspired by the Texarkana Moonlight Murders of 1946).

Alan Vint and Jesse Vint, who played brothers Chris and Wayne Dixon onscreen, are brothers.

== Reception ==
The film earned $10 million in rentals in North America.

The film's critical reception was mixed. Macon County Line holds a 50% rating on Rotten Tomatoes based on eight reviews.

== Home video releases ==
Anchor Bay released the film on both VHS and DVD in February 2000. The Anchor Bay DVD release included an audio commentary with director Richard Compton and the featurette, Macon County Line – 25 Years Down the Road. Both the VHS and DVD have been out of print since 2007.

The Warner Home Video DVD was issued on May 6, 2008. It uses the same transfer from the 2000 DVD release and is single-layered including subtitles - with no extra features.

The film was released on Blu-ray disc by Shout! Factory on January 16, 2018.

== Legacy ==
Richard Compton directed the film Return to Macon County, released theatrically in 1975. Despite its title, the film is not a sequel, although it loosely follows a similar plot of mistaken identity.

== See also ==
- List of American films of 1974
