= Lots of Luck =

1985 television film directed by Peter Baldwin

- Genre: Comedy; Family
- Written by: Deborah Cavanaugh; Eric Loeb
- Directed by: Peter Baldwin
- Starring: Martin Mull; Annette Funicello; Fred Willard; Polly Holliday
- Music by: William Goldstein
- Country of origin: United States
- Original language: English

Production
- Executive producers: John D. Backe; Philip D. Fehrle
- Producer: Shirley J. Eaton
- Production location: Los Angeles
- Cinematography: Reed Smoot
- Editor: Mark Melnick
- Running time: 88 minutes
- Production company: Walt Disney Television

Original release
- Network: Disney Channel
- Release: February 3, 1985

Lots of Luck is a 1985 American made-for-television comedy film produced by Walt Disney Television starring Martin Mull and Annette Funicello, directed by Peter Baldwin. The film originally aired February 3, 1985, on the Disney Channel.

It was Funicello's first film for Disney since The Monkey's Uncle (1965).

== Plot ==
The film focuses on a blue-collar family who wins the lottery. Their lives are changed forever, sometimes for the good, sometimes for the bad.

== Cast ==
- Martin Mull as Frank Maris
- Annette Funicello as Julie Maris
- Fred Willard as A.J. Foley
- Polly Holliday as Lucille
- Mia Dillon as Jessie Foley
- Tracey Gold as Cindy Maris
- Jeremy Licht as David Maris
- Christina Nigra as Trish Maris
- Lonnie Burr as Sid

== Home media ==
Lots of Luck was released on VHS by Walt Disney Home Video in early 1986 as part of "Annette Month", a promotion featuring five films starring Annette Funicello.
