= Ride the Hot Wind =

1971 American action film

- Directed by: Duke Kelly
- Written by: Duke Kelly; Rand Porter; Robert Linder
- Starring: Tommy Kirk; Duke Kelly; Cheryl Waters; Robert Ford Grayling; Sherry Bain
- Production company: V/M Productions
- Release date: 1971
- Country: United States

Ride the Hot Wind is a 1971 film. It was made by Ted Kelly who was a good friend of Audie Murphy.

In 1975, Kirk, Kelly, and several others of those involved in Ride The Hot Wind made My Name Is Legend.

== Plot ==
Captain Gregory Shank is a Vietnam veteran who has been imprisoned by the U.S. Army for being responsible for a massacre during the war. After he's released he tries to start fresh but employers fire him after they find out his past, he gets in brawls and he struggles to maintain a relationship. He falls in with some bikers. They go on a crime spree and the police assume Gregory is the ringleader.

== Cast ==
- Tommy Kirk as Gregory Shank
- Duke Kelly
- Cheryl Waters
- Sherry Bain
- Richard Ford Grayling
- Jared Snyder

== Production ==
Tommy Kirk starred and later recalled about the movie:

This was his [Kelly's] attempt to do a sympathetic dramatisation of a Lieutenant Calley-type character (Mỹ Lai massacre) coming home and portraying his bitterness, alienation and unhappiness at being fingered as a murderer, a baby killer and a monster. That's who I played. I'm not completely embarrassed by the film, but after I saw it, I wished they would have cut some things. Some of it was pretty stinko. Other things weren't so bad. The movie as a whole was a failure, but it wasn't trash.

== See also ==
- List of American films of 1971
