= Return to Macon County =

1975 film by Richard Compton

- Theatrical release poster
- Directed by: Richard Compton
- Written by: Richard Compton
- Produced by: Elliot Schick; Samuel Z. Arkoff (executive producer)
- Starring: Nick Nolte; Don Johnson; Robin Mattson; Eugene Daniels; Robert Viharo; Devon Ericson
- Cinematography: Jacques R. Marquette
- Edited by: Corky Ehlers
- Music by: Robert O. Ragland
- Distributed by: American International Pictures
- Release date: September 3, 1975
- Country: United States
- Language: English
- Budget: $800,000 (estimated)
- Box office: SEK 1,146,410 (Sweden) $3.5 million

Return to Macon County is a 1975 American action drama film. Although written and directed by Richard Compton, who was responsible for the 1974 drive-in classic Macon County Line, and bearing a similar title, this film is not the latter film's sequel. It was re-released by Orion Pictures in the late-1990s. Filming took place on location in and around the city of Forsyth, Georgia during the early winter of 1975.

Set in 1958, the film stars then little-known actors Nick Nolte (as Bo) and Don Johnson (as Harley). They portray friends who are heading to California to enter a drag race.

== Plot summary ==
Bo (Nick Nolte) is the driver and Harley (Don Johnson) is the mechanic. They stop at a roadside diner to eat and meet Junell (Robin Mattson). Junell, while attractive, is in a world of her own. After having an altercation with a customer, she is rescued by Bo and Harley.

The hot-rodding friends find that Junell (with suitcase in hand) wants to travel with them. Their adventure on the road with Junell turns dangerous after a misunderstanding at a grocery store, where Junell is trying to raise funds for Bo and Harley's entrance fee to the drag race. Sgt. Wittaker (Robert Viharo) becomes obsessed with catching them, which leads to tragic results.

== See also ==
- List of American films of 1975
