= Down Liberty Road =

1956 film

- Directed by: Harold D. Schuster
- Produced by: Jerry Fairbanks
- Starring: Tommy Kirk
- Music by: Charles Koff; Clarence Wheeler
- Production companies: Greyhound Lines; Jerry Fairbanks Productions
- Release date: 3 July 1956
- Running time: 33 minutes
- Country: United States
- Language: English

Down Liberty Road is a 1956 American short film directed by Harold D. Schuster. The film is also known as Freedom Highway in the United States. It has an early performance by Tommy Kirk.

== Plot ==
On a cross-country Greyhound bus, passengers give historically dubious summaries of major landmarks. Riders include a grieving father of a fallen soldier and C-list celebrities of the 1950s.

== Cast ==
- Morris Ankrum, as Fred Schroeder, his son, a fallen soldier will be awarded The Medal of Honor
- Angie Dickinson, As Mary, becomes romantically joined with Charles Maxwell, the football player.
- Tommy Kirk, Boy Scout
- John Litel as a signer of the Declaration of Independence
- Charles Maxwell as Bill Roberts, #64 Philadelphia Eagles footballer, a bus companion to Tommy Kirk and Angie Dickinson
- Tex Ritter, Sings and plays guitar
- Marshall Thompson, as unnamed, a visiting spirit
- Mary Treen, As the Philadelphia Eagles front office secretary
- Charles Koff,
- Clarence Wheeler
