= Ken Osborne =

Australian rules footballer

Personal information
- Full name: Ken Osborne
- Born: 26 September 1948
- Died: 3 January 2016 (aged 67)
- Height: 183 cm (6 ft 0 in)
- Weight: 79.5 kg (175 lb)

Playing career^{1}
Years	Club	Games (Goals)
1966–68	Melbourne	13 (7)
- ^{1} Playing statistics correct to the end of 1968.

Ken Osborne (26 September 1948 – 3 January 2016) was an Australian rules footballer who played with Melbourne in the Victorian Football League (VFL).
