= Paul Dobransky =

American psychiatrist (1967-)

Dr. Paul Dobransky
- Born: September 30, 1967 (age 58); Pittsburgh, Pennsylvania, US
- Education: University of Pittsburgh (BS, MD)
- Known for: Relationship theory, character development, PTSD, and human courtship theory
- Scientific career
- Fields: Psychiatry, Television personality, radio personality, author, speaker,
- Workplaces: Fox New National, NBC' nightline

Paul Alexander Dobransky (born September 30, 1967), also known as Dr. Paul, is an American physician, book author, psychiatrist, television and radio personality, magazine writer, speaker, and CEO of several websites.

== Personal life and education ==
Dobransky was born in Pittsburgh, Pennsylvania and is currently living in New York City, New York.

After obtaining a BS in Chemistry from the University of Pittsburgh, he went to the University of Pittsburgh School of Medicine where he received an MD degree in 1993. Dobransky performed his internship in Internal Medicine at Western Pennsylvania Hospital (Pittsburgh, Pennsylvania). While doing his residency in Anesthesiology at Mercy Hospital of Pittsburgh, he decided to switch and instead did his residency in Psychiatry at the University of Colorado Health Sciences Center (Denver, Colorado). Dobransky is a certified psychiatrist since 2001.

== Career ==
Dobransky delivers seminars on dating and relationships to men and women in Chicago, Montreal, and London, and seminars using Mind OS (a synthesis of the disciplines of psychology) to instruct on character maturity, personal growth, communication, decision-making and team-building, as well as gender communication. He has appeared on television programs including The Bachelor, NBC's Nightline, Anderson Cooper 360°, and Fox News.

He also owns a personality temperament diagram used to analyze social and person interaction called King Warrior Magician Lover (KMWL) as well as streaming podcasts for NBC on sex, dating, and relationships.

Dobransky has been a guest speaker in several programs by David DeAngelo, and appeared in numerous television journalism programs (CNN, Fox News National, NBC's Nightline), on radio (currently he is a weekly guest on a syndicated radio show, 2nd Shift, with host Alan Kabel), and print media, including the magazines Maxim, Men's Health, Men's Fitness, Men's Journal, Cosmopolitan, Marie Claire, First For Women, Women's Health, Self, and Psychology Today.

== Books ==
- The Power of Female Friendship (2008) ISBN 978-0-452-28943-7
- The Secret Psychology of How We Fall in Love (2007) ISBN 978-0-452-28818-8
- The Tortoise and Hare Quit the Rat Race: Fulfillment Through Brief Solution-Focused Psychoanalysis (2003) ISBN 978-1-4107-1762-7
- Bathsheba (2005) ISBN 978-1-4208-2423-0
- Get Your Send On (eBook)
