= Tall Paul (song) =

1959 song written by the Sherman Brothers

Single by Annette and the Afterbeats
- B-side: "Ma - He's Making Eyes At Me"
- Released: 1959
- Genre: Pop
- Length: 1:34
- Label: Walt Disney Music Co.
- Songwriters: Bob Roberts; Bob Sherman; Dick Sherman

"Tall Paul" is a song recorded by Annette Funicello and written by the Sherman Brothers, along with Bob Roberts.

== Background ==
It marked the first time that a female singer reached a top ten slot with a rock and roll single. It also spotlighted Annette from the group of Mouseketeers on the Mickey Mouse Club and paved the way for her movie career. Walt Disney personally took notice of the string of chart toppers the Sherman Brothers were writing for Annette and subsequently asked them to work for him exclusively. The Sherman Brothers went on to win two Oscars for Mary Poppins several years later. It was rumored that the song was about Paul Anka, but Anka denied this, saying that he was not tall. (Source: A&E Biography on Annette Funicello.) Anka and Funicello did have a brief relationship before Walt Disney, who was overprotective of Funicello, kept them apart.

== Chart performance ==
"Tall Paul" was credited to Annette and the Afterbeats and reached #7 on the Billboard Hot 100 chart in 1959. It was the highest-charting song by Annette Funicello and also one of the shortest, clocking in at 1 minute and 38 seconds. The version included on Annette: A Musical Reunion with America's Girl Next Door lists the song at 1 minute 52 seconds. The extra time is because of studio chatter at the beginning of the track. In Canada it reached #6 on the CHUM Charts.

== Popular culture ==
Annette Funicello made a cameo appearance as herself in the 1989 film Troop Beverly Hills, while jogging she's singing the first line of "Tall Paul" and being pursued by Frankie Avalon, also playing himself.
