= Escapade in Florence =

- The Magical World of Disney episodes
- Episode nos.: Season 9 Episodes 2-3
- Directed by: Steve Previn
- Written by: Maurice Tombragel; Bob Wehling
- Based on: The Golden Doors by Edward Fenton
- Cinematography by: Kurt Grigoleit
- Original air date: 1962
- Running time: 81 minutes

"Escapade in Florence" is a two-part episode of The Magical World of Disney television show which was released theatrically in some countries. Walt Disney described it as a "two-part teenage comedy adventure" which was "international in flavor". The show first aired on September 30 and October 7, 1962, and was repeated in June 1963 and June 1969.

== Plot ==
Mystery and suspense follow Annette Funicello and Tommy Kirk as they play students studying in the enchanting city of Florence, Italy. As the two find romance among the city's magnificent art and architecture, they discover that her paintings are at the center of an elaborate art forgery ring involving Florence's most treasured masterpieces. Danger soon finds them when they uncover the mastermind behind the plot and they're thrown into an ancient dungeon. It's now up to Annette to save the day, but will help arrive in time?

== Cast ==
- Tommy Kirk as Tommy Carpenter
- Annette Funicello as Annette Aliotto
- Nino Castelnuovo as Bruno
- Clelia Matania as Aunt Gisella
- Venantino Venantini as Lorenzo
- Ivan Desny as Count Roberto
- Odoardo Spadaro as Padrone
- Carlo Rizzo as Uncle Mario
- Renzo Palmer as Carabiniere
- Richard Watson as Butler
- Helen Stirling as Miss Brooks
- Ivan Triesault as Professor Levenson

== Production ==
The film was based on a book by Edward Fenton called The Golden Doors which was published in July 1957. Disney bought the rights in December 1957.

In May 1959 Winston Miller was writing a script for producer William Anderson.

It was shot on location in Florence, Italy. Shooting finished in May 1962. Funicello wrote that Italy was her favourite location ever .

== Reception ==
The Monthly Film Bulletin called it "an almost perfect example of its genre - straightforward story, likeable young protagonists, some good rough and tumble with the hero's skill in jiu jitsu coming in useful, pleasant songs, a general happy atmosphere, and a strong location background."

Diabolique said it "very much puts Kirk front and center, and he is charming as an American abroad getting into hijinks with art thieves."

== Home media ==
Escapade in Florence was released through VHS in March 1986 as part of a promotion called "Annette Month", which honored the film's star Annette Funicello. It was later re-released in DVD format in September 2013 via the Disney Movie Club Exclusives.

== Comic book adaption ==
- Gold Key: Escapade in Florence (January 1963)
