= Richard Compton =

American actor (1938–2007)

- Born: March 2, 1938
- Died: August 11, 2007 (aged 69)

Richard Compton (March 2, 1938 – August 11, 2007) was an American actor, director and writer, primarily in television.

Compton had small parts as an actor in film and television series, including minor roles in two episodes of Star Trek: The Original Series. Years later, he directed an episode of Star Trek: The Next Generation. Other directorial credits included episodes of The X-Files, Charmed, Sliders, Babylon 5 and Miami Vice, as well as the films Macon County Line and its sequel, Return to Macon County (both of which he also co-wrote).

Compton was the husband of actress Veronica Cartwright and the brother-in-law of actress Angela Cartwright.

== Selected filmography ==
- Welcome Home, Soldier Boys (1972)
- The Ransom (1977)
- Deadman's Curve (1978)
- Ravagers (1979)
