= Tommy Kirk =

American actor (1941–2021)

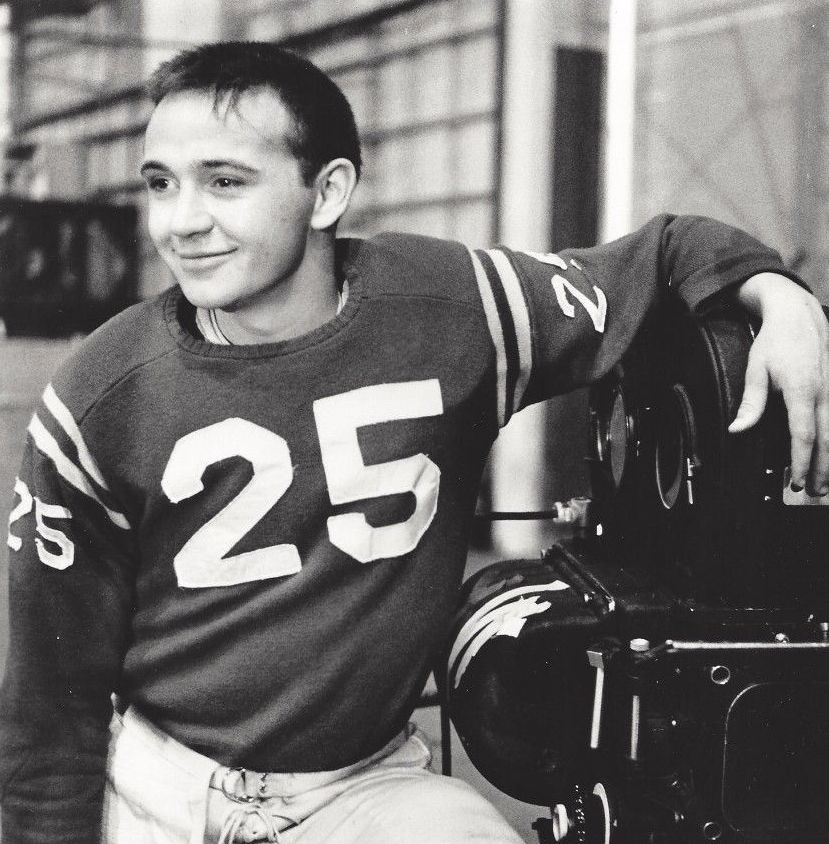
- Kirk on the set of Son of Flubber
- Born: Thomas Lee Kirk; December 10, 1941; Louisville, Kentucky, U.S.
- Died: September 28, 2021 (aged 79) (date body found); Las Vegas, Nevada, U.S.
- Occupation: Actor
- Years active: 1953−1975, 1987−2001
- Known for: The Shaggy Dog; Swiss Family Robinson; The Absent-Minded Professor; Old Yeller
- Parent(s): Louis and Lucy Kirk

Thomas Lee Kirk (December 10, 1941 − September 28, 2021) was an American actor, best known for his performances in films made by Walt Disney Studios such as Old Yeller, The Shaggy Dog, Swiss Family Robinson, The Absent-Minded Professor, and The Misadventures of Merlin Jones, as well as the beach party films of the mid-1960s. He frequently appeared as a love interest for Annette Funicello or as part of a family with Kevin Corcoran as his younger brother and Fred MacMurray as his father.

Kirk's career with Disney ended when news of his homosexuality threatened to become public. He struggled with drug addiction and depression for several years, appearing in a series of low-budget films before leaving the acting business in the mid-1970s. Kirk opened a carpet cleaning business and lived a mostly ordinary life, occasionally appearing at fan conventions. He died at his home in Las Vegas, Nevada, in September 2021, aged 79.

== Early life ==
Kirk was born in Louisville, Kentucky, one of four sons. His father, Louis, was a mechanic who worked for the highway department; his mother, Lucy, was a legal secretary. Looking for better job opportunities, they moved to Downey, California, when Kirk was 15 months old.

In 1954, Kirk accompanied his elder brother Joe to an audition for a production of Eugene O'Neill's Ah, Wilderness! at the Pasadena Playhouse in Pasadena, California. "Joe was star struck," said Kirk. Joe was not cast, losing out to Bobby Driscoll, but Tommy was, and he made his stage debut opposite Will Rogers Jr. "It was five lines, it didn't pay anything, and nobody else showed up, so I got the part," recalled Kirk.

The performance was seen by an agent from the Gertz agency, who signed Kirk and succeeded in casting him in an episode of TV Reader's Digest, "The Last of the Old Time Shooting Sheriffs", directed by William Beaudine. Kirk's brother went on to become a dentist.

Another version of the beginning of Kirk's career was provided by producer John Stephens in the latter's memoirs. Stephens says he had an office at American National while working as a casting director and "this little kid used to stand outside my office". He says the child's father told Stephens his son wanted to be an actor but had not done anything and did not have an agent. Stephens invited Kirk and his father in to read a scene and Kirk was "brilliant". Stephens recommended Kirk to director John Peyser, who was looking for a child actor and Kirk got the part. Kirk was in demand almost immediately.

== Disney career ==
In April 1956, 14-year-old Kirk was cast as Joe Hardy for The Mickey Mouse Club serial The Hardy Boys, alongside Tim Considine as Frank Hardy. The first of the serials, The Mystery of the Applegate Treasure, was filmed in June and early July 1956, and aired in October at the start of the show's second season. In the following year, the second serial The Mystery of Ghost Farm aired in 1957. The show and Kirk's performance were extremely well received and led to a long association between the actor and the Disney studio. A year prior to being cast in The Hardy Boys, Kirk first auditioned for another serial Spin and Marty, but was unsuccessful. The open audition took the form of a baseball game.

In August 1956, Disney hired him and the former Mouseketeer Judy Harriet to attend both the Republican and Democratic presidential nominating conventions, for newsreel specials that later appeared on the show. Kirk also hosted short travelogues for the serial segment of the show's second season, sometimes with Annette Funicello. He did the voice-over narration for "The Eagle Hunters" and dubbing work for the Danish-made film Vesterhavsdrenge, shown on the Mickey Mouse Club as the serial "Boys of the Western Sea". Around this time, it was announced that Kirk would appear as Young Davy Crockett, but this did not happen.

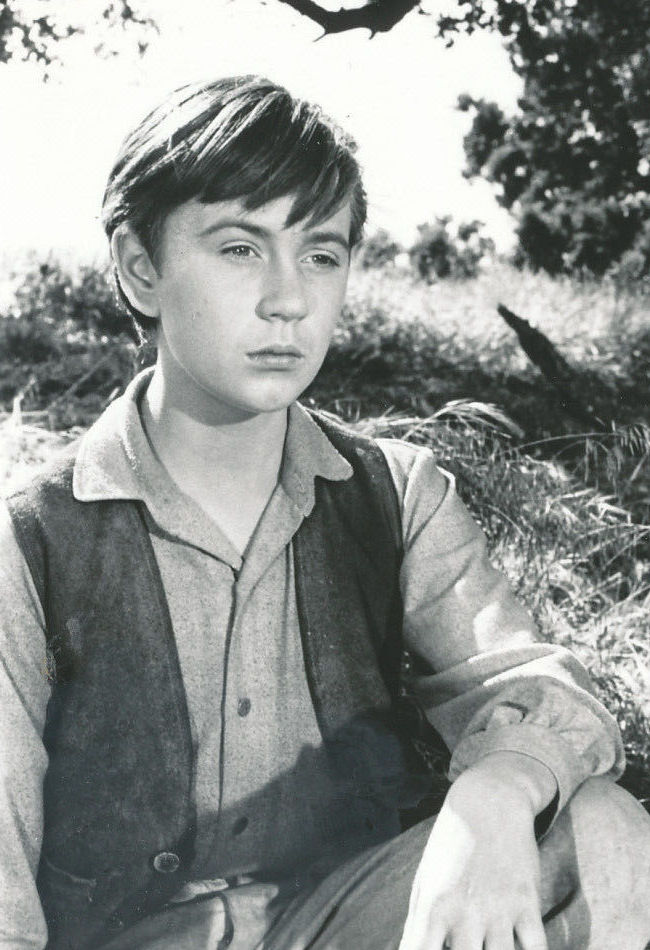
Kirk in a photo for Old Yeller (1957)

Kirk's career received its biggest break yet when, in January 1957, Disney cast him as Travis Coates in Old Yeller (1957), an adventure story about a boy and his heroic dog. Kirk had the lead role in the film, a success at the box-office, and he became Disney's first choice whenever they needed someone to play an all-American teenager. Kevin Corcoran played his younger brother and the two of them were often cast as brothers. Later that year, Kirk and Corcoran were announced for the cast of The Rainbow Road to Oz, a feature film based on the stories of L. Frank Baum, but this film was never produced.

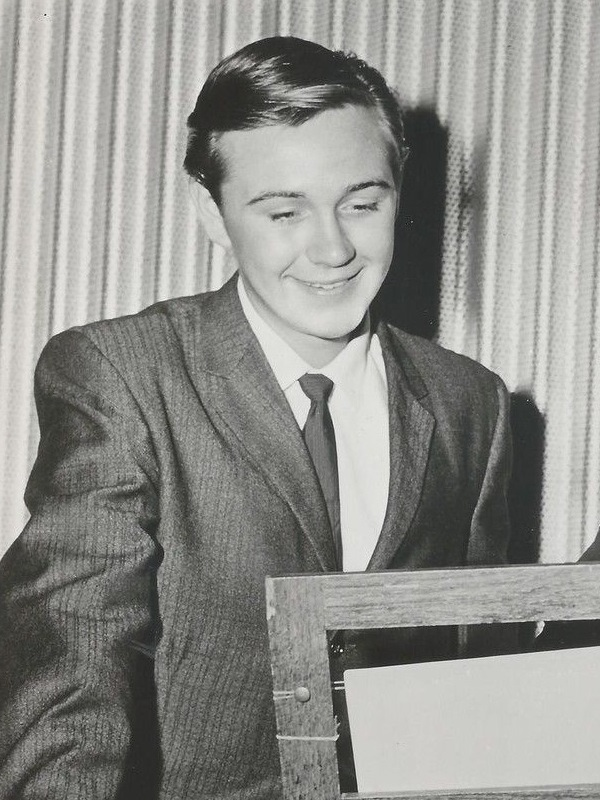
Kirk during recording for the English dub of The Snow Queen

In July 1958, Kirk was cast in The Shaggy Dog (1959), a comedy about a boy inventor, who, under the influence of a magic ring, is repeatedly transformed into an Old English Sheepdog. This teamed him with Corcoran and Considine, and two other Disney stars with whom he regularly worked, Fred MacMurray and Annette Funicello. According to Diabolique, "Much of the credit went to MacMurray; a lot of the credit should have gone to Kirk, whose easy-going boy next door charm made him the ideal American teen." Kirk said that when filming finished, Disney told him they did not have any projects for him and his contract would not be renewed. "I was thin and gangly and looked a mess ... I thought the whole world had fallen to pieces," he said. (At the same time, Film Daily called Kirk one of its five "male juveniles" of the year, the others being Tim Considine, Ricky Nelson, Eddie Hodges, and James MacArthur.)

With his Disney contract completed, Kirk went to Universal Pictures, where he played the male lead in the English dub of a Soviet animated feature, The Snow Queen, opposite Sandra Dee.

Shaggy Dog turned out to be a hit, gaining significantly larger rentals than Old Yeller, and Disney soon contacted Kirk, offering him another long-term contract and a role as middle son Ernst Robinson in another adventure film, Swiss Family Robinson (1960), starring John Mills, Janet Munro, and once again Dorothy McGuire as his onscreen mother and Corcoran. It remained Kirk's favorite movie. When he returned from filming in the West Indies, the studio signed him to two more movies.

Kirk followed with a secondary role in a fantasy comedy starring Fred MacMurray, The Absent-Minded Professor (1961), another huge hit. Disney sent Kirk to England for The Horsemasters (1961), a youth-oriented horse riding film, which was made for U.S. television, but screened theatrically in some markets. He appeared once more with Munro and Funicello. That same year, Kirk played the support role of Grumio in the fairy tale fantasy Babes in Toyland, supporting Funicello, Ray Bolger, Ed Wynn and Tommy Sands. Kirk later described this film as "sort of a clunker ... but it has a few cute moments, it's an oddity", and enjoyed working with Ed Wynn. It was a box-office disappointment; so too was Moon Pilot (1962), a satirical comedy where Kirk played the younger brother of Tom Tryon.

Kirk acted in a family comedy with MacMurray, Bon Voyage (1962), with other family members played by Jane Wyman, Deborah Walley, and Corcoran. On set, Kirk did not get along with his onscreen parents. He later admitted that his own neediness made him view MacMurray as a surrogate father, a role MacMurray had no wish to fulfill. Kirk also had trouble with Jane Wyman, saying: "She was very mean to me. She went out of her way to be shitty ... but she was a total bitch and I think she was homophobic." Kirk maintained better relationships with his onscreen brothers Kevin Corcoran and Tim Considine, who called Kirk "a monster talent".

Kirk starred with Funicello in another overseas-shot story which screened in the United States on TV, but was released in some countries theatrically: Escapade in Florence (1962). Newspaper columns occasionally linked Kirk and Funicello's names romantically, though in fact, they were never anything more than friendly coworkers.

In July 1962, Disney announced they would make The Happiest American with Kirk, but it was not made. Instead, he did a sequel to Absent Minded Professor, Son of Flubber (1963), his last film with MacMurray.

In 1963, Kirk reprised his role as Travis Coates in Disney's Savage Sam (1963), a sequel to Old Yeller, which reunited him with Corcoran and co-starred Brian Keith; it was not as well received as Old Yeller.

Disney then cast Kirk as student inventor Merlin Jones in The Misadventures of Merlin Jones (1964), again opposite Funicello. The film was directed by Robert Stevenson, who was frequently assigned Disney comedies. It became an unexpected box-office sensation, earning $4 million in rentals in North America, and Disney invited Funicello and him back to make a sequel, The Monkey's Uncle (1965). The Monkey's Uncle came out in July 1965 and was almost as successful as Merlin Jones.

== Television ==
Kirk began to work steadily in television throughout 1956 and 1957 in episodes of Lux Video Theatre ("Green Promise"), Frontier ("The Devil and Doctor O'Hara"), Big Town ("Adult Delinquents"), Crossroads ("The Rabbi Davis Story"), Gunsmoke ("Cow Doctor"), Letter to Loretta ("But for God's Grace", "Little League") and Matinee Theatre ("The Outing", "The Others" – a version of Turn of the Screw).

Kirk supported Angie Dickinson in a short feature called Down Liberty Road, a.k.a. Freedom Highway (1956), a short commercial travelogue produced by Greyhound Lines to promote their Scenicruiser buses.

Concurrent with his film career at Disney, Kirk continued to guest star on television series, such as The O. Henry Playhouse ("Christmas by Injunction"), The Californians (as Billy Kilgore in "Little Lost Man"), Matinee Theatre ("Look Out for John Tucker"), Playhouse 90 ("A Corner of the Garden"),The Millionaire ('Millionaire Charles Bradwell") (1959) Bachelor Father ("A Key for Kelly"), Mr. Novak, "Love in the Wrong Season" (1963), Angel ("Goodbye Young Lovers"), and The Alfred Hitchcock Hour ("Ten Minutes from Now") (1964).

== Later films ==
The news of Kirk's termination from Disney Studios was not made public, but Kirk was soon working for American International Pictures (AIP), which needed a leading man to co-star with Funicello in a musical they were preparing, The Maid and the Martian. Kirk was cast as a Martian who arrives on Earth and falls in with a bunch of partying teenagers. The movie was later retitled Pajama Party (1964) and was a box-office success.

AIP then cast him in The Ghost in the Invisible Bikini (1966) with Deborah Walley. Soon after, he and Walley were put in It's a Bikini World, filmed in late 1965 under the direction of Stephanie Rothman. It was not released until 1967. Also for AIP, he appeared in a TV special, The Wild Weird World of Dr. Goldfoot (1965), made to promote Dr. Goldfoot and the Bikini Machine, which aired in November 1965. In December, he announced he would make three more films for Exclusive, starting with Teacher, Teacher, alongside Bob Denver and Dawn Wells but the film would not be made.

Following his work for AIP, Kirk spent the remainder of the 1960s making various low-budget films, including Village of the Giants (1965) for Bert I. Gordon; The Unkissed Bride (1966) for Jack H. Harris; Track of Thunder and Catalina Caper in 1967; and two films for Texan director Larry Buchanan: Mars Needs Women (1968) and It's Alive! (1969). Kirk got along well with Buchanan and the two would often spend time together off-set.

Kirk said he reached bottom in 1970 when he did two movies that were not Screen Actors Guild, Ride the Hot Wind and Blood of Ghastly Horror, causing him to almost lose his SAG card. "Finally, I said, to hell with the whole thing, to hell with show business, I'm gonna make a new life for myself, and I got off drugs, completely kicked all that stuff." In the 1970s, he was in a 1973 episode of The Streets of San Francisco and then starred in low-budget western My Name Is Legend (1975). While filming My Name is Legend, Kirk was thrown from a horse and injured.

== Singing ==
In the succession of films with Annette Funicello, Kirk recorded a few songs to accompany the films. For Pajama Party (1964), they recorded and filmed "There Has to Be a Reason" in a lip-synced performance as a duet. However, the original recording track was heavily altered by the studio engineers, mostly with echo effect. Kirk described his own singing voice as "wispy and adolescent". For Merlin Jones, Kirk featured on the song "The Scrambled Egghead" with Funicello.

Later in his career, Kirk returned to his home state of Kentucky and performed in musical theatre, including Guys and Dolls, Hello, Dolly! (as Horace Vandergelder), Anything Goes (as Moonface Martin), A Funny Thing Happened on the Way to the Forum (as Marcus Lycus), and Little Mary Sunshine (as General Fairfax).

== Personal life ==
=== Sexuality ===
Kirk later recalled being gay and working at Disney as "terrible". He said the studio:

Were growing aware. They weren’t stupid; they could add two and two, and I think they were beginning to suspect. I noticed people in certain quarters were getting less and less friendly. You know, you can tell. To complicate the thing, I was messing around with drugs and drinking. I wasn’t disciplined; I was kind of a wild Irish person and nobody could tell me what to do. I lived my life exactly as I pleased; I tried to keep my private life private, but I was messing around and I was drinking a lot and going around to wild parties and carrying on, you know — and this is all contrary to the Disney image."

While filming The Misadventures of Merlin Jones in 1963, 21-year-old Kirk began a relationship with a 15-year-old boy, and was caught having sex with him at a swimming pool in Burbank. The boy's mother informed Disney, who elected not to renew Kirk's contract. Walt Disney personally fired Kirk, but when Merlin Jones became an unexpected hit, Disney allowed him to return long enough to film a sequel, The Monkey's Uncle.

Kirk publicly came out as gay in a 1974 interview with John Marvin. At the time he was studying acting at the Lee Strasberg Theatre and Film Institute, while working as a busboy in a Los Angeles restaurant.

In 2017, while being interviewed for an online talk radio show, Kirk said that he regarded himself as bisexual. "I have had relations with women too. I am not just gay, I am—I happen to be both, I would say. Like many people."

=== Alcohol and drugs ===
Kirk had issues with alcohol and drugs, later saying:

I was drinking from the time I was 14. I always liked it. I started messing with drugs in the last couple of years at Disney—around '62. I'd get so tired, and somebody gave me some amphetamines, and they made me feel good and gave me energy, and I got addicted. There were a lot of people mixing them with alcohol. I very nearly died of an overdose a couple of times in 1966. I got off drugs absolutely by 1968, but I continued to drink. During that part of the 60s, I was pretty messed up and I wasn't employable; I wasn't fit for work. I wouldn't go for treatment and nobody could tell me what to do; I just wrecked everything in my life. Thank God I didn't do anything that I look back on with horror...I didn't kill anybody in a car accident or kill myself, though I very nearly did, drinking and driving.... I fell asleep at the wheel on the Ventura Freeway one night about 1967, and drove diagonally across the Freeway. Just missed getting creamed by a truck... It was mainly pills. Speed, uppers, diet pills—and I got thin as a rake, and I was high all the time. It was a terrible period in my life.

=== Arrests ===
On Christmas Eve 1964, Kirk was arrested for suspicion of possession of marijuana at a house in Hollywood. The district attorney's office subsequently refused to file a complaint against him on the marijuana charge. The city attorney's office, however, filed an illegal drugs charge, because officers found a vial of barbiturates in his car. This charge was dismissed by a judge in early January when Kirk's attorney established that the barbiturates had been prescribed by a physician. However, the damage to his career had been done. He was replaced on How to Stuff a Wild Bikini (1965) by Dwayne Hickman (intended as AIP's follow-up to Pajama Party), on The Sons of Katie Elder by Michael Anderson, Jr. and on Beach Ball by Edd Byrnes. His initial casting in these films was announced in late 1964.

== Post-acting career ==
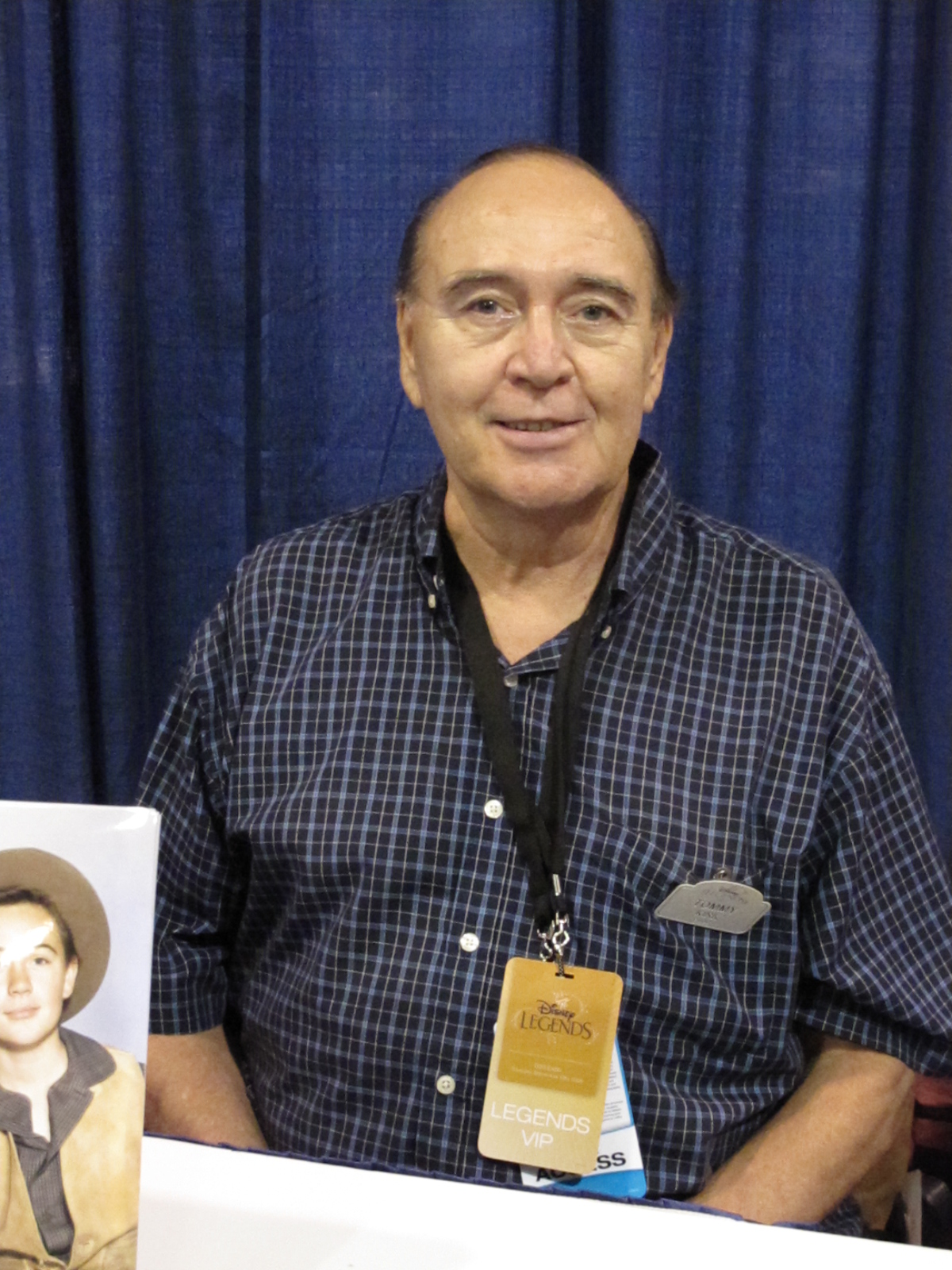
Kirk at the 2009 Disney D23 Expo

"I lost everything I had," Kirk recalled. "I lost my money, my property; I partied it all away. I was very irresponsible financially. I lived my own life; I guess I was just seeking love or pleasure or some kind of illusory or transitory happiness, and I was pretty wild. The first 10 years after leaving Disney were pretty awful."

Kirk got over his drug addiction and gave up acting in the mid-1970s. He worked as a waiter and a chauffeur before going into the carpet-cleaning business in the San Fernando Valley area of Los Angeles, an operation which he ran for 20 years.

In 1990, Kirk said he was "poor", but had "No bitterness. No regrets." He wrote an unproduced script about Abraham Lincoln and continued to act occasionally, including small roles in Streets of Death (1988) and Attack of the 60 Foot Centerfold (1995). He also enjoyed writing and occasionally appearing at retro film conventions. He had maintained a lifelong friendship with his Old Yeller co-star Beverly Washburn, since re-meeting at a convention in 1994. He lived a private life and did not believe in "exhibiting" himself, preferring to keep away from the public eye.

In 1993 Kirk said "I’ve quit drugs. I don't use anything at all. I don’t smoke; I don’t drink; I don't use drugs. I eat a very healthy diet, and I feel pretty good. I enjoy my work and I am a Christian. I’ve found Christianity to be a huge and tremendous help in getting the poison out of my system, purging myself of resentments and bitterness." Kirk was inducted as a Disney Legend on October 9, 2006, alongside his former co-stars Tim Considine and Kevin Corcoran. His other repeat co-stars, Annette Funicello and Fred MacMurray, had already been inducted in 1992 and 1987, respectively. Also in 2006, the first of Kirk's Hardy Boys serials was issued on DVD in the fifth "wave" of the Walt Disney Treasures series. At that point, he was retired with "a nice pension" and living in Redding, California.

== Death ==
Kirk was found dead at his Las Vegas apartment on September 28, 2021. He was 79 years old.

== Filmography ==
Year	Title	Role	Notes
1956	The Peacemaker	Tommy	Uncredited
1956	Down Liberty Road		Short
1957	Old Yeller	Travis Coates	
1957	The Snow Queen	Kay	Voice, 1959 English dubbed version
1959	The Shaggy Dog	Wilbur "Wilby" Daniels	
1960	Swiss Family Robinson	Ernst Robinson	
1961	The Absent-Minded Professor	Biff Hawk	
1961	Babes in Toyland	Grumio	
1961	The Horsemasters	Danny Grant	TV Series
1962	Moon Pilot	Walter Talbot	
1962	Escapade in Florence	Tommy Carpenter	TV Series
1962	Bon Voyage!	Elliott Willard	
1963	Son of Flubber	Biff Hawk	
1963	Savage Sam	Travis Coates	
1964	The Misadventures of Merlin Jones	Merlin Jones	
1964	Pajama Party	Go Go The Martian	
1965	The Monkey's Uncle	Merlin Jones	Last Disney appearance
1965	Village of the Giants	Mike	
1966	The Ghost in the Invisible Bikini	Chuck Philips	
1966	The Unkissed Bride	Ted	
1967	It's a Bikini World	Mike Samson / Herbert Samson	
1967	Catalina Caper	Don Pringle	
1967	Track of Thunder	Bobby Goodwin	
1968	Mars Needs Women	Dop / Martian Fellow No. 1 / Mr. Fast / Seattle Sun Reporter	TV Movie
1969	It's Alive!	Wayne Thomas	TV Movie
1971	Blood of Ghastly Horror	Sergeant Cross	
1973	Ride the Hot Wind	Captain Gregory Shank	
1975	My Name Is Legend		
1988	Streets of Death	Frank Philips	
1995	Attack of the 60 Foot Centerfold	Passenger	
1998	Billy Frankenstein	Blind Monk	

== Television ==
- TV Reader's Digest — "The Last of the Old Time Shooting Sheriffs" — January 17, 1955
- Frontier — "The Devil and Doctor O'Hara" — February 5, 1956
- Letter to Loretta — "But for God's Grace" — April 1, 1956
- Big Town — "Adult Delinquents" — May 8, 1956
- Crossroads — "The Rabbi Davis Story" — June 8, 1956
- Gunsmoke — "Cow Doctor" — September 8, 1956
- Letter to Loretta — "Little League" — September 16, 1956
- The Mickey Mouse Club — "The Hardy Boys: The Mystery of the Applegate Treasure" — October 2–26, 1956
- Matinee Theatre — "The Outing" — November 2, 1956
- The Mickey Mouse Club — "The Eagle Hunters" — voice over narration
- The Mickey Mouse Club — "Boys of the Western Sea" — voice over
- Matinee Theatre — "The Others" (based on The Turn of the Screw) — February 15, 1957
- The Mickey Mouse Club — "The Mystery of Ghost Farm" — September 13 – December 20, 1957
- The Californians — "Little Lost Man" — December 3, 1957
- Matinee Theatre — "Look Out for John Tucker" — June 4, 1958
- Playhouse 90 — "A Corner of the Garden" — April 23, 1959
- The Millionaire — "Millionaire Charles Bradwell" — June 10, 1959
- Bachelor Father — "A Key for Kelly" — November 19, 1959
- Angel — "Goodbye Young Lovers" — May 17, 1961
- Mr. Novak — "Love in the Wrong Season" –December 3, 1963
- Shindig! — "The Wild Weird World of Dr. Goldfoot" — November 18, 1965
- The Streets of San Francisco — "Deadline" — February 15, 1973
