= Bon Voyage! (1962 film) =

1962 film by James Neilson

- Theatrical release poster
- Directed by: James Neilson
- Screenplay by: Bill Walsh
- Based on: Bon Voyage! by Joseph & Merrjane Hayes
- Produced by: Walt Disney
- Starring: Fred MacMurray; Jane Wyman; Michael Callan; Deborah Walley; Jessie Royce Landis; Tommy Kirk; Georgette Anys; Kevin Corcoran; Ivan Desny; Françoise Prévost
- Cinematography: William Snyder
- Edited by: Cotton Warburton
- Music by: Paul Smith
- Production company: Walt Disney Productions
- Distributed by: Buena Vista Distribution
- Release date: May 17, 1962
- Running time: 132 minutes
- Country: United States
- Language: English
- Budget: $3 million
- Box office: $5 million (rentals)

Bon Voyage! is a 1962 American comedy film directed by James Neilson and produced by Walt Disney Productions. It stars Fred MacMurray, Jane Wyman, Deborah Walley, Tommy Kirk, and Kevin Corcoran as the Willard family on a European holiday. The character actor James Millhollin appears in the film as the ship's librarian.

== Plot ==
Harry Willard finally makes good on his promise to take his bride of 20 years, Kati, on a long-delayed trip by ship to Europe. They are accompanied by their 19-year-old son (Elliott), 18-year-old daughter (Amy), and 11-year-old son (Skipper). Amy meets a young student, Nick O'Marah, from Yale. Elliott is heartbroken over a girl back home that he left behind but eventually gets over it by spending time with other girls. Harry attempts to get to be acquainted all over again with his family. The Willard family eventually meets Nick's wealthy socialite mother. Nick struggles on whether or not to get a job and break away from his mother and her money. Nick finally decides to break up with Amy and get a job in New York. The Willard family first starts their voyage on a luxury liner. Then they move into Paris. Nick was supposed to go to London but ended up in Paris. From the time they arrive at the dock, an unending series of comedy adventures and romantic encounters ensue until, exhausted but happy, they leave with memories that will stay with them all for years to come.

== Cast ==
- Fred MacMurray as Harry Willard
- Jane Wyman as Katie Willard
- Michael Callan as Nick O'Mara
- Deborah Walley as Amy Willard
- Jessie Royce Landis as Countessa 'La Comtesse' DuFresne
- Tommy Kirk as Elliott Willard
- Georgette Anys as Madame Clebert
- Kevin Corcoran as Skipper Willard
- Ivan Desny as Rudolph Hunschak
- Françoise Prévost as The Girl
- Alex Gerry as Horace Bidwell
- Howard Smith as Judge Henderson
- Max Showalter as The Tight Suit
- James Millhollin as Ship's Librarian
- Marcel Hillaire as Sewer Guide
- Richard Wattis as Party Guest

== Production ==
=== Development ===
The film was based on a 1956 novel by Joseph and Merrijane Hayes. Joseph Hayes had written The Desperate Hours and Bon Voyage was his second book; he and his wife wrote it after taking a trip across the Atlantic.

Film rights were bought by Universal before the book had even been published for $125,000 and that the film was to be produced by Ross Hunter and written by the Hayes'. Esther Williams was originally announced as star. Then, James Cagney was going to play the lead. Filming dates were pushed back when Bing Crosby was linked to the project.

In early 1960, Disney optioned the novel. Disney said it was likely Ken Annakin would direct with Karl Malden, James MacArthur and Janet Munro to star. Later, Robert Stevenson was announced as director.

Disney said: "It's far out for us, but still Disney. I'm really a gag man and missed the kind of pictures Frank Capra and Harold Lloyd used to make. Since nobody else wanted to do them, I decided to make them myself."

Eventually, Fred MacMurray, Jane Wyman, and Tommy Kirk were confirmed as the three leads, but casting the daughter proved more difficult. Disney commented: "You must build a picture. You don't write it all – only part of it. And it's the light and comic picture that's toughest of all to build."

Michael Callan was cast from the play of West Side Story. Deborah Walley was cast on the basis of her performance in Gidget Goes Hawaiian (in which Callan had also appeared _.

=== Shooting ===
Filming began on 15 August 1961. It took place partly on location on a genuine ocean liner, the SS United States, travelling across the Atlantic and in France. Walt Disney accompanied the film on location. Tommy Kirk recalled it as a troublesome production:

We all got sick in France. Everybody got this awful dysentery; everybody was sick as dogs for a couple of weeks. And we still had to shoot; I remember that. Frankly, I couldn’t stand James Neilson, the director; I thought he was a real jerk. He had all the tact of a toilet seat; I just couldn't stand him.

Tommy Kirk did not get along with Jane Wyman:

I thought Jane Wyman was a hard, cold woman and I got to hate her by the time I was through with Bon Voyage. Of course, she didn't like me either, so I guess it came natural. I think she had some suspicion that I was gay and all I can say is that, if she didn't like me for that, she doesn't like a lot of people.

Kirk says the film was the only time he had a fight with Fred MacMurray.

There was an actor on the movie, named Elliot Reid, who was always doing Groucho Marx impressions, and I said a Groucho line, kidding Fred: “Oh, no, you've got the close-up and I get the back of my head." And he took it wrong and he turned around and turned red in the face, and he just shook from head to toe, and he put his finger in my face and gave me the worst bawling out I’ve ever had in my life. You know, whoa!

The title song was written by Disney staff songwriters, Robert B. Sherman and Richard M. Sherman.

== Reception ==
=== Box office ===
Bon Voyage! grossed $9,082,042 in the United States and earned $5 million in theatrical rentals. According to Kinematograph Weekly the film was considered a "money maker" at the British box office in 1962.

=== Critical response ===
Bosley Crowther of The New York Times wrote: "Everything possibly unearthable in the way of an obvious cliché involving the hick behavior of American tourists abroad seems to have been dug out from somewhere by the screen-playwright, Bill Walsh, and made to fit into this enactment of a family's vacation odyssey."

Variety stated: "Walt Disney dishes up another comedy blockbuster in this rollicking tour de force of an American family seeing Europe for the first time." Philip K. Scheuer of the Los Angeles Times declared it "the half-year's funniest farce".

Brendan Gill of The New Yorker wrote that Disney "always manages to put a pleasing, no-expense-spared shine on his goods, but in this case the goods go back at least as far as Mark Twain and his 'Innocents Abroad', and maybe to Sterne and his 'Sentimental Journey'."

The Monthly Film Bulletin wrote: "The film, though unmistakably from the Disney stable, has little of the affectionately zany humor that so unexpectedly enlivened The Parent Trap and The Absent-Minded Professor."

This film ran into some criticism for including a prostitute who flirts with characters who are minors played by Kirk and Corcoran.

== Accolades ==
The film was nominated for two Academy Awards:

- Costume Design (Color)-(Bill Thomas)
- Sound (Robert O. Cook)

== Home media ==
Bon Voyage! was released on video in 1987. It was released on DVD on Feb 03, 2004.
