= Michael Callan =

American actor (1935–2022)

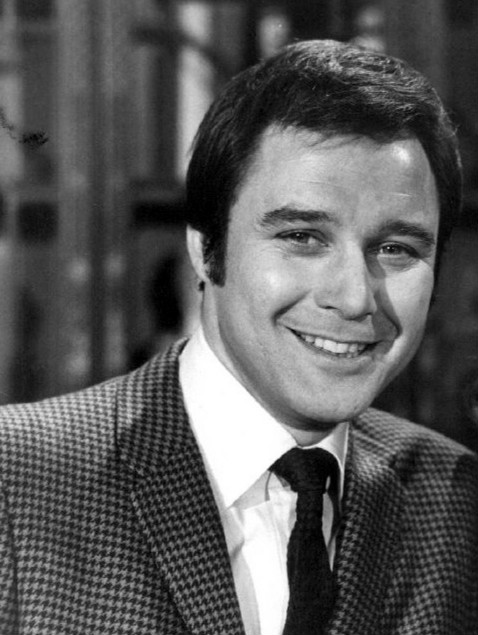
- Callan in 1970
- Born: Martin Calinoff; November 22, 1935; Chester, Pennsylvania, U.S.
- Died: October 10, 2022 (aged 86); Woodland Hills, Los Angeles, California, U.S.
- Other name: Mickey Calin
- Occupations: Actor, dancer
- Years active: 1954–2006
- Spouses: Carlyn Chapman (m. 1960; div. 1967) Patricia Harty (m. 1968; div. 1970) Karen Malouf (m. 1975; div. 1984)
- Children: 2 (with Chapman)

Michael Callan (born Martin Calinoff; November 22, 1935 – October 10, 2022), sometimes known as Mickey Collins, was an American actor best known for originating the role of Riff in West Side Story on Broadway, and for his film roles for Columbia Pictures, notably Gidget Goes Hawaiian, The Interns and Cat Ballou.

== Early life ==
Born Martin Calinoff in Chester, Pennsylvania to a Jewish family, Callan grew up in Philadelphia, where his father Louis Calinoff was a restaurateur. Callan described him as "the only Jewish businessman in Philly to have two Italian restaurants." Callan began taking singing lessons at nine and dancing lessons at eleven. He appeared on the local show The Horn and Hardart Children's Hour.

By the age of fifteen, he was dancing in local night clubs. Two years later, Callan moved to New York City and performed under the name of "Mickey Calin".

== Career ==
=== Broadway ===
Callan's first big break came when he was cast in The Boy Friend (1954) starring Julie Andrews, and Catch a Star (1955). He and his dance partner, Grace Genteel, appeared on The Ed Sullivan Show and Chance of a Lifetime.

When he was 21, he auditioned for Jerome Robbins for the role of "Riff" in the original Broadway production of West Side Story (1957–59). He auditioned several times before getting the role over a period of a year, and he was almost taken out at the last minute because director Jerome Robbins felt he was "too good-looking" for the part. Robbins told him that he had to "be more hostile" and needed to "concentrate on something to hate." Callan "concentrated on Jerry Robbins."

His performance in West Side Story was a great personal triumph. From October 1957 there were reports of studios interested in him.

Callan was seen by talent scout Joyce Selznick, who worked for Columbia Pictures. Columbia was on a "youth talent" drive at the time and signed Callan to a seven-year deal in June 1958. He had been using the name "Mickey Calin" but would use the name "Michael Callan". Selznick said Callan only wanted to sign a two-pictures-a-year contract, but she persuaded him that he would benefit from the extra exposure that studio would give him under a long-term deal.

=== Columbia Pictures ===
Columbia Pictures' first role for Callan was in a prestige production, They Came to Cordura (1959), starring Gary Cooper. Columbia then considered Callan for a number of projects, including The Mountain Road, by Theodore White, Parrish, and Let No Man Write My Epitaph. Callan's second film with Columbia was the lead role in The Flying Fontaines (1959).

In October 1959, Columbia Pictures announced that Callan was one of 11 young names the studio would be building up—the others were James Darren, Evy Norlund (Darren's soon-to-be wife), Glenn Corbett, Carol Douglas, Jo Morrow, Margie Regan, Joby Baker, Rian Garrick, Joe Gallison, and Steve Baylor. He co-starred with Dick Clark and Tuesday Weld in Because They're Young (1960), and had a cameo in Pepe (1960).

Callan was unable to reprise his West Side Story role of Riff in the film version due to his contract with Columbia, but he did dance in the film Gidget Goes Hawaiian (1961), opposite Deborah Walley as Gidget and Darren as Moondoggie. He appeared in the fantasy adventure film, Mysterious Island (1961).

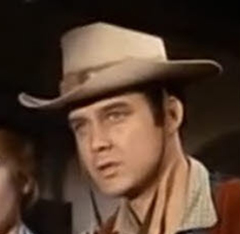
Callan in trailer for Cat Ballou

Callan was a juvenile delinquent threatening Alan Ladd in 13 West Street (1962), then was reunited with Walley in the family comedy, Bon Voyage! (1962) for Walt Disney. Filmink argued "Callan had a strand of cruelty about his screen persona, which ensured that he was an excellent villain, but could be unsettling in more sympathetic roles such as this one." Back at Columbia, Callan appeared in a big hit, The Interns (1962), as one of four young doctors. Selznick said at the time "Mickey is very hot now".

Callan had a supporting role in The Victors (1963) and a bigger one in The New Interns (1964). In April 1964 Columbia said they had signed him to a new contract and would put him in King Rat. In June 1964 Columbia announced they had signed him to a six-picture contract.

Callan did not appear in King Rat. In 1964, he guest-starred in episodes of television series Twelve O'Clock High and Breaking Point. Around this time he released an album, My Home Town. He was announced for the lead role in King Rat but in what has been described as "the biggest missed opportunity of Callan's career" the part went to George Segal.

After You Must Be Joking! (1965) Callan played the romantic lead in the Western comedy Cat Ballou (1965) opposite Jane Fonda. Filmink argued "even if most of the attention for that movie went to Fonda and Lee Marvin, Callan was very winning, and it’s a shame that he didn’t play the love interest for more female stars." In August 1965, he signed a four-picture deal with Columbia and at one point was mentioned as a possible star for the space adventure Marooned (1969).

=== Television ===
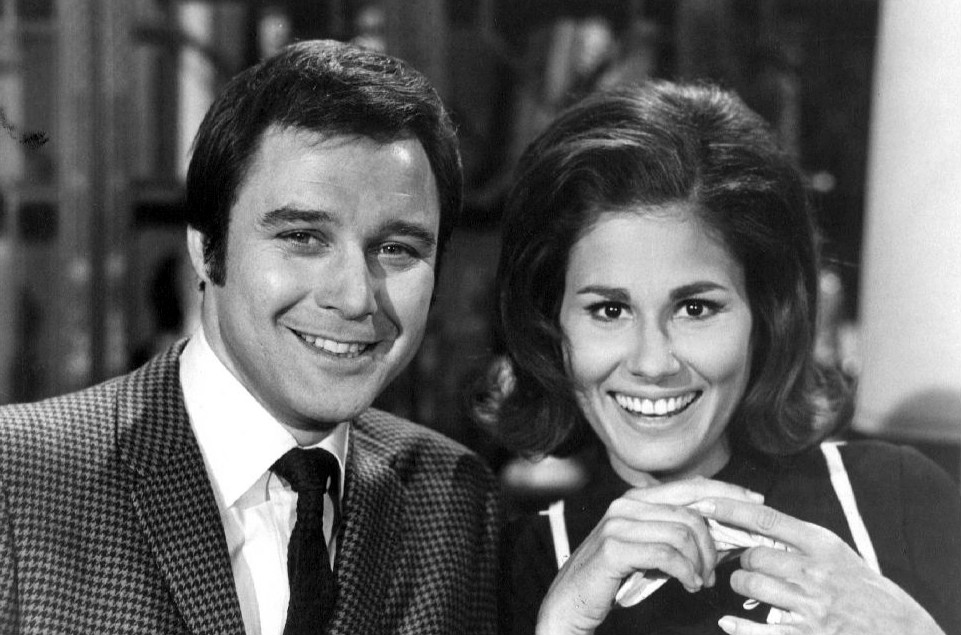
Michael Callan and Ann Prentiss from the television movie, In Name Only (1969)

After eight years and 13 films with Columbia, Callan landed the lead role of Peter Christopher on the NBC Television sitcom Occasional Wife made by Columbia's Screen Gems. In 1968, he co-starred as "Bill Calhoun" in the ABC-TV production of Cole Porter's Kiss Me, Kate starring Robert Goulet and Carol Lawrence. FilmInk noted that Callan only rarely played film leads after this.

It was a very very quick fall, especially considering The Interns and Cat Ballou had been so popular and not that long ago. Were there behavioural/temperament issues? Just conjecture. But it does seem odd that a good looking, charismatic performer, who could act and move, didn’t get any more leads. Callan was probably best suited for two types of roles – the love interest for a female star... or musicals. And from the late sixties onwards, Hollywood made less musicals and/or vehicles for female stars. Still, this was the time of spaghetti Westerns, war films in Yugoslavia, Australian thrillers, Europudding spy epics, and telemovies – there were star parts going for white male actors with some sort of profile. But Callan didn’t get any.

=== Later career ===
Callan's later films included The Magnificent Seven Ride!, Lepke and The Cat and the Canary. His additional television credits include Breaking Point; Hazel; That Girl; The Name of the Game; The Mary Tyler Moore Show; Ironside; Marcus Welby, M.D.; Griff; McMillan & Wife; Barnaby Jones; 12 O'Clock High; Quincy, M.E.; Charlie's Angels; Simon & Simon; Fantasy Island; The Love Boat; The Bionic Woman; four episodes of Murder, She Wrote; and eight episodes of Love, American Style. He also played Hal B. Wallis in My Wicked, Wicked Ways: The Legend of Errol Flynn; and Metallo in Superboy.

Callan both produced and starred in his own film, Double Exposure (1982). He also returned, occasionally, to the stage in both straight plays and musicals including Absurd Person Singular; Killjoy; Love Letters; Hello Muddah, Hello Faddah; The Music Man; and George M!. Callan appeared in the Off-Broadway musical Bar Mitzvah Boy in 1987. His later credits included Stuck on You (2003) and The Still Life (2006). His TV credits also include Viper, shot in Canada; and 65 episodes of a cop show, Crosstown; as well as ER.

== Awards ==
Callan was nominated for the Golden Globe Award for New Star of the Year in 1960 for The Flying Fontaines; and won in the same category the following year, for Because They're Young.

== Personal life and death ==
Callan had two daughters, Dawn and Rebecca. He died of pneumonia on October 10, 2022, at the Motion Picture & Television Country House and Hospital in Woodland Hills, California, at the age of 86.

== Partial filmography ==
Sources

- They Came to Cordura (1959) – Pvt. Andrew Hetherington
- The Flying Fontaines (1959) – Rick Rias
- Because They're Young (1960) – Griff Rimer
- Pepe (1960) – Dancer
- Gidget Goes Hawaiian (1961) – Eddie Horner
- Mysterious Island (1961) – Herbert Brown
- 13 West Street (1962) – Chuck Landry
- Bon Voyage! (1962) – Nick O'Mara
- The Interns (1962) – Dr. Alec Considine
- The Victors (1963) – Eldridge
- The New Interns (1964) – Dr. Alec Considine
- Cat Ballou (1965) – Clay Boone
- You Must Be Joking! (1965) – Lieutenant Tim Morton
- The Magnificent Seven Ride! (1972) – Noah Forbes
- Frasier, the Sensuous Lion (1973) – Marvin Feldman
- The Photographer (1974) – Adrian Wilde
- Lepke (1975) – Robert Kane
- The Bionic Woman (1977, TV series) – John Bernard
- Record City (1978) – Eddie
- The Cat and the Canary (1979) – Paul Jones
- Double Exposure (1982) – Adrian Wilde
- Chained Heat (1983) – Martin
- Freeway (1988) – Lt. Boyle
- Leprechaun 3 (1995) – Mitch
- Drifting School (1995) – Andrew Morgan
- The Last Road (1997)
- Stuck on You (2003) – Fox Prexy
- The Still Life (2006) – Resident

== Theatre credits ==
- The Boyfriend
- West Side Story
- Promises, Promises (1972)
- Anything Goes (1972)
- Hello Muddah Hello Father (1997) - producer
