= Linda Benson =

American surfer

Personal information
- Born: Linda Rae Benson

Surfing career
- Sport: Surfing

Surfing specifications
- Stance: Goofy

Linda Rae Benson is an American surfer and surfing stunt performer. A leading women's competitive surfer during the 1950s and 1960s, she won the women's division of the Makaha International Surfing Championship in 1959 and multiple United States surfing championships. At age 15, she became the first woman known to have surfed Waimea Bay on the North Shore of Oahu. Benson also worked as a surfing stunt double in a number of Hollywood beach films during the 1960s, including films starring Annette Funicello and Deborah Walley.

== Early life and surfing career ==
Benson was born in 1944. She grew up in Encinitas, California, and began surfing at age 11 at Moonlight Beach. She later recalled that before she had a board of her own, she would retrieve boards lost by her older brother and his friends and paddle them back out.

In 1959, at age 15, Benson won the women's division of the Makaha International Surfing Championship in Hawaii. She was the youngest contestant to enter the competition.

That same year, Benson became the first woman known to surf Waimea Bay, then emerging as one of the best-known big-wave surfing locations in Hawaii. Benson later recalled borrowing a smaller board from another surfer before paddling out at Waimea.

Benson competed extensively during the following decade, winning more than 20 surfing contests and several major women's titles. Her victories included West Coast championships in 1960 and 1961 and United States championships in 1964 and 1968.

A goofy-foot surfer, Benson was known for surfing large waves despite her small stature.

== Film work ==
Benson was part of the Southern California surfing scene at Malibu when surfing was becoming popular in films and on television. She worked as a surfing stunt double for actresses appearing in Hollywood beach films. Benson doubled for Deborah Walley in Gidget Goes Hawaiian and later performed surfing scenes for former Mickey Mouse Club performer Annette Funicello in films including Beach Party (1963), Muscle Beach Party and Bikini Beach.

Other surfers were also recruited as doubles for the films. Mickey Muñoz, for example, performed in surfing scenes while wearing a blonde wig as a double for Sandra Dee.

== Tandem surfing ==
Benson also participated in tandem surfing in which two surfers ride the same board and perform lifts and acrobatic maneuvers. Her tandem partners included surfboard shapers and competitive surfers Don Hansen, Hobie Alter and Mike Doyle.

Benson was also associated with surfboard shaper Dale Velzy, who shaped the board she rode at Waimea.

== Film appearances ==
Benson appeared in or was featured in a number of surfing films and documentaries, including:

Surf Safari (1959) by John Severson; Sunset Surf Craze (1959) directed by Walt Phillips; Cavalcade of Surf (1962) by Bud Browne; The Women and the Waves (2009) directed by Heather Hudson, and Dear & Yonder (2009) by Tiffany Campbell and Andria Lessler.

== Recognition ==
Benson was selected as the Surfing Walk of Fame's Woman of the Year in 1997.

In 2010, the California Surf Museum presented Benson with its Silver Surfer Award, a lifetime-achievement honor recognizing contributions to surfing culture.

She has also been inducted into surfing halls of fame, including the International Surfing Hall of Fame and the Hermosa Beach Surfers Walk of Fame.

In 2015, Benson was the inaugural inductee into the San Diego Surfing Hall of Fame. The organization cited her Makaha championship, Waimea surfing and work as a Hollywood surfing stunt performer.
