= The Interns (film) =

1962 film by David Swift

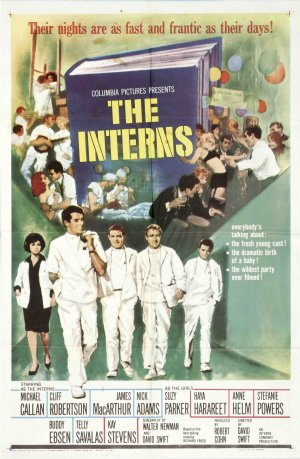
- Original film poster by Howard Terpning
- Directed by: David Swift
- Screenplay by: Walter Newman; David Swift
- Based on: The Interns; 1960 novel by Richard Frede
- Produced by: Robert Cohn
- Starring: Michael Callan; Cliff Robertson; James MacArthur; Nick Adams; Suzy Parker; Haya Harareet; Anne Helm; Stefanie Powers; Buddy Ebsen; Telly Savalas; Kaye Stevens
- Cinematography: Russell Metty
- Edited by: Al Clark; Jerome Thoms
- Music by: Leith Stevens
- Production company: Robert Cohn Productions
- Distributed by: Columbia Pictures
- Release date: August 8, 1962 (New York City)
- Running time: 120 minutes
- Country: United States
- Language: English
- Budget: $1,400,000
- Box office: $9,230,769

The Interns is a 1962 American drama film directed by David Swift and starring Michael Callan, Cliff Robertson, James MacArthur, Nick Adams, Haya Harareet and Suzy Parker. The film was a surprise box office hit and was followed by a 1964 sequel, The New Interns, and a 1970–1971 television medical drama series, The Interns, that was based on the films. The Interns was directed by David Swift.

== Plot ==
A class of interns arrives for their first year in training at a public city hospital, which serves patients from many different ethnic and socioeconomic groups. Close friends and classmates John Paul Otis and Lew Worship plan to become surgeons and open their own clinic together. They are less than thrilled about their assignment to obstetrics, feeling that delivering babies is not very difficult.

Lew becomes romantically involved with student nurse Gloria, while John becomes infatuated with fashion model Lisa Cardigan. Lisa dislikes the idea of dating a relatively impoverished young doctor, and is pregnant out of wedlock by another man. Although John offers to solve her problem by marrying her, she pressures him to illegally obtain pills for her in hopes of ending the pregnancy. He finally does so, and is caught and reported by Lew, ending their friendship and John's medical career.

Sid Lackland aspires to serve wealthy patients so he can make a lot of money. Then he becomes attached to Loara, a girl from a poor village in Southeast Asia, who is one of his patients. She has a rare medical condition and is scheduled for a serious operation. Loara resists his friendly overtures because she is sure she will die in the hospital. Sid is heartbroken when Loara dies during her surgery.

Alec Considine wants a residency under eminent psychiatrist Dr. Bonney, and secretly cheats on his wealthy fiancée Mildred with Dr. Bonney's longtime nurse Vicky Flynn in hopes of being introduced to the doctor. To keep up his medical duties and spend time with both women, Alec takes Dexedrine to stay awake. Although he does meet Dr. Bonney, who offers him a residency, Mildred discovers his affair and leaves him.

Madolyn Bruckner aspires to become a surgeon under abrasive Dr. Domenic Riccio. Despite her skills as an intern, Riccio discourages her because he is prejudiced against female doctors, assuming they will abandon their medical careers to get married and have children. Riccio later finds out Madolyn has already been married and has a child, yet is still pursuing her medical career as a single working mother.

At the end of the year, Alec, Lew, and several other interns come under suspicion when a terminally ill, immobile patient who has been begging to die is found dead of a barbiturate overdose. None of the involved interns can accept their residencies until the source of the drugs is found, creating a risk that the residency offers will be withdrawn. Alec, strung out on Dexedrine, has a nervous breakdown at the thought of losing his residency with Dr. Bonney. Lew and the other interns visit the patient's wife and find out that she gave him the drugs after being worn down by his constant pleas that if she really loved him, she would help him die. As a result, the interns are no longer under suspicion and can accept their offers.

Lew, having developed an interest in obstetrics after delivering a baby, accepts a residency at the same hospital, and convinces Gloria, who had planned to travel and see the world, to marry him, instead. Sid gets an offer from a wealthy hospital, but inspired by Loara, he goes to practice in impoverished Southeast Asia, instead. Riccio hires Madolyn as his resident assistant. John, now married to Lisa, visits his former classmates and tells Lew he respects him for his sense of ethics. A new class of interns arrives and Lew shows them the way to their dormitory, just as a doctor did for him the previous year.

== Cast ==
- Michael Callan as Dr. Alec Considine
- Cliff Robertson as Dr. John Paul Otis
- James MacArthur as Dr. Lew Worship
- Nick Adams as Dr. Sid Lackland
- Suzy Parker as Lisa Cardigan
- Haya Harareet as Dr. Madolyn Bruckner
- Anne Helm as Mildred
- Stefanie Powers as Nurse Gloria Mead
- Buddy Ebsen as Dr. Sidney Wohl
- Telly Savalas as Dr. Dominic Riccio
- Katharine Bard as Nurse Vicky Flynn
- Kaye Stevens as Nurse Didi Loomis
- Gregory Morton as Dr. Hugo Grandchard
- Angela Clarke as Mrs. Emma Auer
- Connie Gilchrist az Nurse Connue Dean
- Ellen Davalos as Loara
- Carroll Harrison as Nurse Olga
- John Banner as Dr. Duane
- Mari Lynn as Samantha Simon
- Brian G. Hutton as Dr. Joe Parelli (as Brian Button)
- J. Edward McKinley as Dr. Robert Bonny
- Bobo Lewis as Gwen
- Ira Barmak as Second Intern
- Bill Gunn as Rosco (uncredited)

== Production ==
The film was based on a novel by 26-year-old Richard Frede, who had worked as an intern for two years. It was published in 1960 and became a best seller. Film rights were bought for a reported $75,000 plus 15% of the profits. It was optioned by producer Robert Cohn who set up the project at Columbia.

Columbia offered the film to David Swift to direct. "it was the first property that had been presented to me and I thought I could make a fairly decent movie of it, a commercial script", said Swift. Among the changes Swift made was adding more comedy which "leavened the austerity and brutality of the hospital background", according to the director.

A soundtrack album of the Leith Stevens scored, jazz-based music was released on Colpix Records.

Robert Wagner had signed a three-picture deal with Columbia, and announced he would play the role of Lew. "This won't be another Dr. Kildare picture, with the standard romance and the other stereotypes, I can assure you", said Wagner. However his role ended up being played by James MacArthur.

Sidney Poitier was also announced for the cast but did not appear in the final film.

== Reception ==
The movie originally ran for three hours but was cut down to two.

=== Critical ===
Variety said the film was "undistinguished" and "at times... comes perilously close to earning the nickname, Carry On, Intern."

FilmInk argued Callan was "terrifically effective."

=== Box office ===
The film grossed $9,230,769 at the box office, earning $5 million in US theatrical rentals. It was Columbia's biggest grossing film of the year.

== See also ==
- List of American films of 1962
