= Cottonwood Creek (Encinitas) =

Coordinates: 33.0482°N 117.2987°W

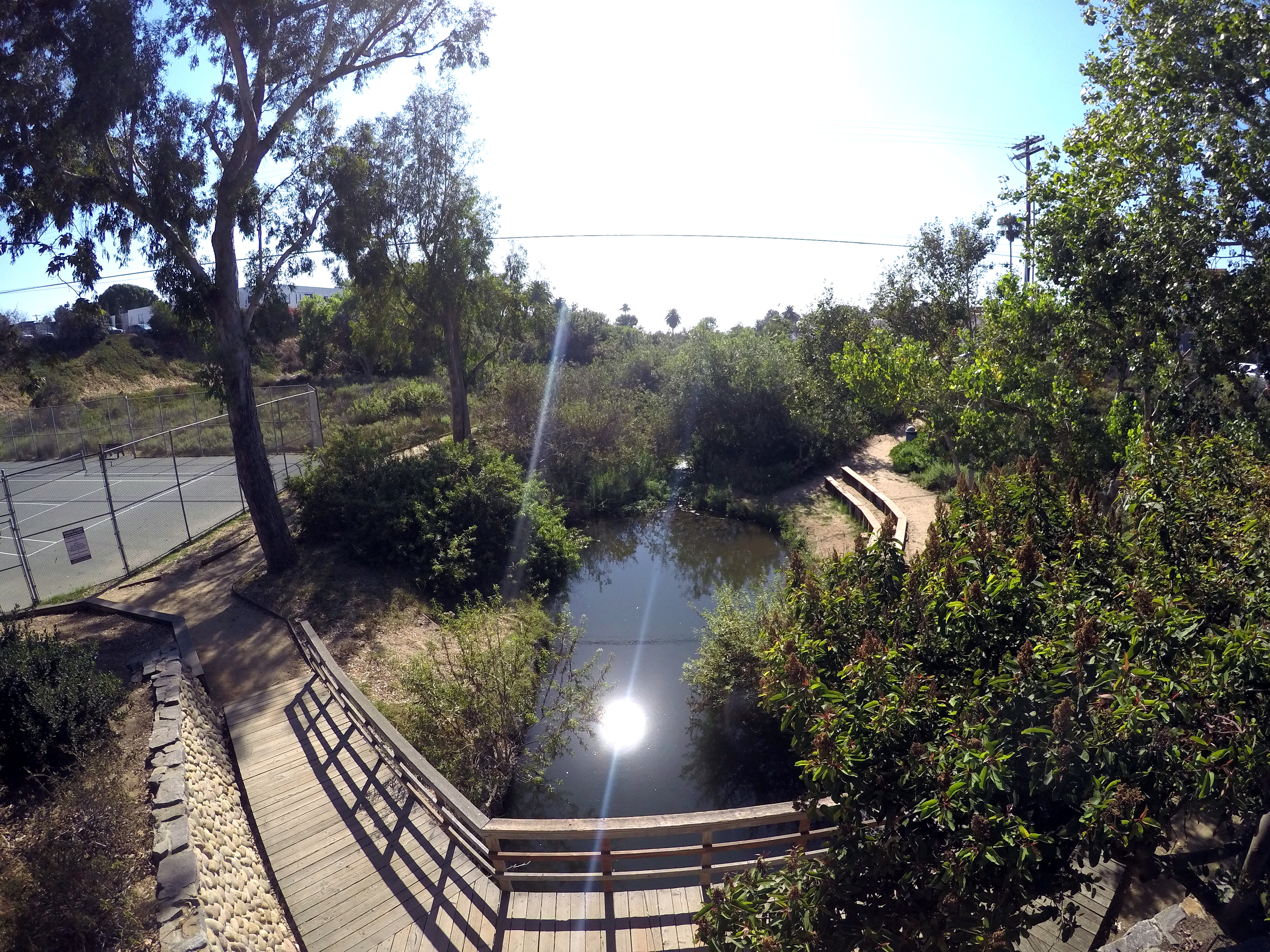
- Looking downstream towards Moonlight Beach

Location
- Country: United States
- State: California
- Region: San Diego County

Physical characteristics
- Source: Cottonwood Creek Park
- Mouth: Moonlight Beach
  - location: City of Encinitas, California
  - elevation: 0 ft (0 m)

Cottonwood Creek is a stream in San Diego County, California. It originates in the Cottonwood Creek Park in the town of Encinitas, then flows towards Moonlight Beach, where it discharges into the Pacific Ocean.

Beginning in 1881 steam locomotives stopped to replenish their boilers with the water from Cottonwood Creek which produced the steam that moved the trains. A town formed around this site and would evolve into Encinitas. The creek was also a water source for the community in times of drought. For these reasons, in 1991 it was designated by the State of California a Point of Historic Interest.
