= Kaye Stevens =

American actress (1932–2011)

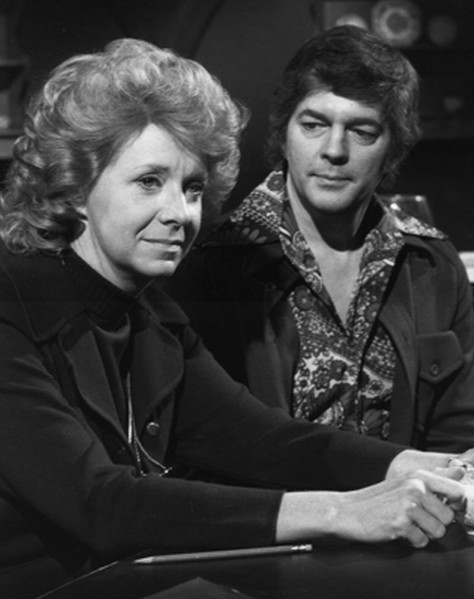
- Stevens as Jeri Clayton with Bill Hayes in Days of Our Lives, 1974
- Born: Catherine Louise Stephens; July 21, 1932; Pittsburgh, Pennsylvania, U.S.
- Died: December 28, 2011 (aged 79); The Villages, Florida, U.S.
- Occupations: Singer, actress
- Years active: 1962-1992
- Spouse: Tommy Amato (m. 1955; div. 1961) Gerald Armstrong (m. 1964; div. 1965) Woodrow Maxwell Melvin Jr. (m. 1977; div. 1978)

Kaye Stevens (born Catherine Louise Stephens, also sometimes spelled Kay Stevens, July 21, 1932 – December 28, 2011) was an American singer and actress. Her big break in show business came at the Riviera Hotel in Las Vegas, when the headliner for the night, Debbie Reynolds, became ill and Stevens filled in for the night. She then went on to do small shows in New York City at the Plaza Hotel's Persian Room and the Waldorf Astoria, and Caesars Palace on the Las Vegas Strip.

== Early life ==
Born Catherine Louise Stephens in Pittsburgh, Pennsylvania on July 21, 1932, she was an only child. Her family eventually moved to Cleveland, where she got her start as a drummer and singer as a teenager.

== Career ==
=== Acting ===
Stevens started out in film in The Interns (1962), where she played Didi Loomis, a nurse, and its 1964 sequel The New Interns. She also appeared in The Man From the Diners' Club (1963), which starred Danny Kaye. Stevens had a role in the television movie Let's Switch! (1975) and in 1983 appeared in the film Jaws 3-D. She was considered for the title role for the musical Funny Girl (Barbra Streisand) in the early 1960s.

In her role on Days of Our Lives, Stevens introduced a new song, "You Light Up My Life", to the television audience. It was a huge success, and soon after, Kaye decided that she had to write new songs and create an album: "I knew then that if I got the kind of response from one song, I had to do an album of inspirational, motivational, spiritual-pop music."

Stevens appeared on such television game shows as Match Game, Hollywood Squares, Celebrity Sweepstakes, The Price Is Right, Tattletales (Episode #2.28 on Oct. 21, 1974 appearing with then boyfriend Tom Lindstrom), and Password. She appeared as a guest star on many series, including CHiPs, Police Woman, and B.L. Stryker. Since 1994, Stevens was a regular on Hour of Power.

=== Singing ===
After her big break at the Riviera Hotel in Las Vegas, she went from small audiences to sold-out audiences in New York City, Miami, and Los Angeles. From there, she went on tour with The Rat Pack, Johnny Carson, and Bob Hope.

== Personal life and death ==
Stevens married bandleader and trumpet player Tommy Amato in 1955. The couple performed throughout the eastern United States. They divorced in 1961. Stevens then married realtor Gerald Armstrong in September 1964 in Honolulu, Hawaii, but they divorced after less than one year. Stevens' third marriage, to Miami attorney Woodrow Maxwell "Mac" Melvin, also ended in divorce after less than a year.

Stevens lived in Margate, Florida, from the late 1950s until 2004. She did public relations for Jack Marquesee, the city's developer. Many Margate residents referred to Stevens as the "First Lady of Margate" because every time she appeared on game shows, she placed a sign next to her nameplate that read "Hello Margate." She promoted Margate as "a great place to live and raise a family." Stevens served as grand marshal in many of the city's parades on July 4, and a city park is named in her honor. When Stevens was home in Margate for the Christmas holiday, she gathered her neighbors and friends at the Margate Hospital to sing Christmas carols to the patients.

In her last 20 years, Stevens founded a Christian ministry and only performed Christian or patriotic music.

She lived in retirement in Summerfield, Florida, and died at age 79 on December 28, 2011, after battling breast cancer and blood clots, according to Gerry Schweitzer, a close friend. She left no immediate survivors.

=== Vietnam ===
In 1965, Stevens went on a USO tour in Vietnam with Bob Hope and with a group of fellow entertainers to boost the morale of American soldiers. She was quoted as saying "I came back in 1965, and my life was in shambles because of what I saw".

== Honors, awards, and nominations ==
Stevens received a Golden Globe nomination as Best Supporting Actress in 1963 for her work in the film The Interns.

City of Margate officials named a park in her honor. Kaye Stevens Park is located 5825 Royal Palm Blvd. The city dedicated a life-size bronze statue of her on April 5, 2016.

== Filmography ==
- The Interns (1962) as Nurse Didi Loomis
- The Man from the Diners' Club (1963) as Bea
- The New Interns (1964) as Didi
- The Great Masquerade (1974) as Officer Fulton
- Jaws 3-D (1983) as Mrs. Kellender

== Television ==
Year	Title	Role	Notes
-	Hollywood Squares	Herself	TV game show
-	To Tell the Truth	Herself	TV game show
-	Celebrity Sweepstakes	Herself	TV game show
-	$25,000 Pyramid	Herself	TV game show
-	The Price Is Right	Herself	TV game show
-	Password	Herself	TV game show
1964	Toast of the Town	Singer	variety show, 5 episodes
1962-1964	The Ed Sullivan Show	Singer/Comedian	variety show, 6 episode
1967	The Dean Martin Show	Singer	variety show, 2 episodes
1967	Everybody's Talking	Herself	talk show, 1 episode
1967	The Hollywood Palace	Singer	variety show, 1 episode
1968	Family Affair	Julie Madden	1 episode
1969	Playboy After Dark	Singer	1 episode
1969	The Temptations Show	Singer	variety show
1973	The Tonight Show Starring Johnny Carson	Herself	talk show, 4 episodes
1974	Match Game	Herself	TV game show, 15 episodes
1974	Tattletales	Herself	TV game show
1974-1979	Days of Our Lives	Jeri Clayton	TV soap opera
1975	Let's Switch!	Flo Moore	
1978	Police Woman	Roz	1 episode
1979	CHiPs	Woman in Phone booth	3 episodes
1979	240-Robert	Valerie Barnes	1 episode
1983	Jaws 3-D	Mrs. Kellender	
1989	B.L. Stryker		1 episode
1990	Superboy	Mother	1 episode
1992	Miss America: Behind the Crown	Monica	

== Recordings ==
=== Albums ===
- "Ruckus at the Riviera" – Columbia Records
- "Kaye Stevens in Person at the Copa" – Liberty Records
- "Not So Great Songs from Not So Great Movies" – Liberty Records
- "Playgirls" – Liberty Records
- "The Grass Will Sing for You" – Liberty Records
- "The Temptation Shows Guest Starring Kaye Stevens" – Motown Records

=== Singles ===
- "You Brought Me Back to Love Again" – Sun Records
- "Someone Must Have Hurt You a Lot" – Capitol Records
- "Friends Are Friends Forever" – NLT Records
- "I'm Going Back to Tennessee" – NLT Records
