= Joyce Selznick =

American casting director and screenwriter

- Born: February 12, 1925; Pittsburgh, Pennsylvania, United States
- Died: September 17, 1981 (aged 56); Hollywood, Los Angeles, California, United States
- Occupations: Talent agent, casting director and screenwriter
- Years active: 1940s to 1981 (her death)
- Known for: Discovery and development of actors Tony Curtis and James Darren

Joyce Gloria Selznick (February 12, 1925 – September 17, 1981) was an American talent agent, casting director, and screenwriter. She was the niece of film producer David O. Selznick (Gone with the Wind, 1939), providing her with early exposure to the industry. Her career spanned three decades and began with her discovery of a New York truck driver named Bernie Schwartz whom she developed into a matinee idol and future actor Tony Curtis. and climaxed with the casting of The Buddy Holly Story, released in 1978. Her work ended with her premature death from breast cancer in 1981 at the age of fifty-six.

== Early life ==
Born in Pittsburgh, Pennsylvania, Joyce Gloria Selznick was a daughter of Phil Selznick, the owner operator of the It Cafe, Mocambo and the Sphinx Club, three popular nightclubs on the Sunset Strip in Los Angeles, California. After spending part of her formative years in Cleveland, Ohio, she continued her personal growth in the cultural atmosphere of 1930s-era Hollywood culture. She aspired, from a young age, to become a writer, and reached out to syndicated advice columnist William F. McDermott when she was just fourteen years old for advice on how to begin a career as a newspaper columnist and asked him for a job as "a junior member" of his staff. He subsequently published her letter, his reply to her, and her response to that reply in his column in newspapers nationwide between November 1939 and early 1940. Despite his advice to avoid a newspaper career, she continued to write and pitch her work. In January 1940, she informed him that, although she had decided not to become a columnist, she hadn't given up on her dream. She had based her decision on "the revival of interest in [her] book by a studio," adding:

"All I can tell you about the story is that it is a deep novel and very original. More of a 'Garden of Allah.' But yet not at all like it. The inspiration was given to me when attending the finest school in the country, Notre Dame Academy in Cleveland. A story like this would never have entered my mind if I had not attended the academy. But even with this I have told you, you can not begin to imagine what the story is about."

== Career ==
During the late 1940s, she discovered New York truck driver Bernie Schwartz, who later became known as actor Tony Curtis.

She discovered nineteen-year-old James Darren, recognizing his talent when he contacted her based on the recommendation of a photographer's secretary, Yvonne Bouvier, in 1959. Darren recalls:

"I was studying acting in New York City with Stella Adler. I'd been studying with her for a couple of years...[Yvonne Bouvier] set up a meeting between me and Joyce Selznick, who worked for Screen Gems. I went down to 1650 Broadway, the Brill Building. On my way to [the] meeting with Joyce, we just happened to get on the elevator at the same time. She kept staring at me. I never met her. She never met me. We got off at the same floor and walked to the same office. That was our meeting. Joyce brought me over to Columbia Pictures about a week later and got me a contract there."

Darren was cast in Rumble on the Docks, released in 1956, and after receiving hundreds of fan letters for a non-lead role, his casting and fame continued to flourish.

While working as the eastern talent scout for Colpix Records, a division of Columbia Pictures in 1959, she signed the emerging pianist/singer Nina Simone. Colpix released nine albums for Simone.

Selznick also cast Michael Callan to Columbia although as pointed out by Filmink magazine "around this time, the studio also signed Evy Norlund, Glenn Corbett, Carol Douglas, Jo Morrow, Margie Regan, Joby Baker, Rian Garrick, Joe Gallison, and Steve Baylor… so, their star making program was a little bit “buy as many scratchies as you can and see how you go"." She did cast Deborah Walley in Gidget Goes Hawaiian.

Selznick eventually did casting work for films, including 1978's The Buddy Holly Story. She was responsible for selecting Gary Busey to play Holly, in what was an Oscar-nominated performance.

Critics praised Busey's singing and acting, the recognizing of talent in both being something in which Selznick was experienced. Selznick served as the casting director for 13 films during her career and was a screenwriter for three other films.

== Death ==
Selznick was diagnosed with breast cancer, which claimed her life on September 17, 1981 in Hollywood, California.

== In popular culture ==
In the 1988 TV movie The Ann Jillian Story, Selznick was portrayed by Pam Hyatt.
