= The Flying Fontaines =

1959 film

- Directed by: George Sherman
- Written by: Don Mullaly; Lee Ervine
- Produced by: Sam Katzman
- Starring: Michael Callan
- Cinematography: Fred Jackman, Jr.
- Edited by: Saul A. Goodkind
- Production company: Clover Productions
- Distributed by: Columbia Pictures
- Release date: December 1959
- Running time: 84 minutes
- Country: United States
- Language: English

The Flying Fontaines is a 1959 American circus film about trapeze artists. It stars Michael Callan.

== Plot ==
Rick Rias gets out of the army and returns to his old job as a trapeze artist. He discovers his old girlfriend has married another trapeze artist.

== Cast ==
- Michael Callan as Rick Rias
- Evy Norlund as Suzanne Fontaine
- Joan Evans as Jan Fontaine
- Rian Garrick as Bill Rand
- Joe De Santis as Roberto Rias
- Roger Perry as Paul Fontaine
- Jeanne Manet as Michele Fontaine
- John Van Dreelen as Victor Fontaine
- Barbara Kelley as Margie

Veteran actor Pierre Watkin appears uncredited in his last film role as a doctor.

== Production ==
It was one of a number of circus-themed films around this time that followed from the success of Trapeze (film) (1956) (others were Toby Tyler and The Big Circus). The film was originally known as High Trap. Filming started 20 April 1959. The sets were designed by the veteran art director Paul Palmentola, his last film credit.

== Reception ==
Variety called it a "fastmoving circus yarn" in which "the whole panorama of the circus is vividly portrayed."

Photoplay wrote "We get a good look at three new young players: Michael Callan, Evy Norlund and Rian Garrick... Mickey comes across nicely as a temperamental “flyer” who's lugging around a burden of guilt, but too bad, against the circus background there wasn't a story with more color, laughs, action."

Filmink argued Callan "easily outshone the other new Columbia contract players who were in it."
