= The New Interns =

1964 film by John Rich

- Film poster by Howard Terpning
- Directed by: John Rich
- Written by: Wilton Schiller; John Rich
- Starring: Michael Callan; Dean Jones; Telly Savalas; Barbara Eden; Stefanie Powers; Kaye Stevens; Inger Stevens; George Segal
- Cinematography: Lucien Ballard
- Edited by: Gene Milford; Eda Warren
- Music by: Earle Hagen
- Production company: Robert Cohn Productions (as The New Interns Company)
- Distributed by: Columbia Pictures
- Release date: June 1, 1964
- Running time: 123 mins.
- Country: United States
- Language: English
- Box office: est. $2,670,000 (US/ Canada)

The New Interns is a 1964 American drama film directed by John Rich, and the sequel to the 1962 film The Interns, itself based on the novel of the same name by Richard Frede. It stars Michael Callan and Dean Jones. For his performance, George Segal won the Golden Globe Award for New Star of the Year – Actor. The movie and its predecessor later spawned a short-lived TV show, The Interns, that aired on CBS from 1970 to 1971.

== Plot ==
After a nervous breakdown, Dr. Alec Considine comes back to New North Hospital for another year of internship. He develops an immediate attraction for a student nurse, Laura Rogers, but she's not so inclined unless he's got marriage in mind.

Social worker Nancy Terman is sexually assaulted by juvenile delinquents who grew up in the same neighborhood as Dr. Tony "Shiv" Pirelli. New intern Dr. Tony Pirelli quarrels with Riccio and falls in love with Nancy as well.

As other personal dramas occur, including newlywed Dr. Lew Worship discovering he is sterile and cannot have children, Nancy's attackers end up in a fracas at the hospital and Alec ends up injured. After his recovery, Alec decides to marry Laura and remain on New North's staff.

== Cast ==
- Michael Callan as Dr. Alec Considine
- Dean Jones as Dr. Lew Worship
- Telly Savalas as Dr. Dominick 'Dom' Riccio
- Stefanie Powers as Gloria Worship née Mead
- Barbara Eden as Nurse Laura Rogers
- Adrienne Ellis as Nurse
- George Segal as Dr. Tony "Shiv" Parelli
- Inger Stevens as Nancy Terman
- Greg Morris as Dr. Pete Clarke
- Dawn Wells as Bobbie
- Kaye Stevens as Nurse Didi Loomis
- Gregory Morton as Dr. Granchard

== Production ==
The Interns was a commercial success and Columbia announced a follow-up. It was thought James MacArthur, Michael Callan, Stefanie Powers, Telly Savalas and Kaye Stevens would return, Cliff Robertson and Suzy Parker would not, and Nick Adams may make a guest appearance. An original story was written by Wilton Schiller, producer of Ben Casey.

Kay Stevens signed a three-picture deal with producer Robert Cohn the first of which was to be The Interns.

Cohn offered the job of directing to John Rich, who was under contract to Hal Wallis but loaned out to make th emovie. (This meant he had to turn down the chance to direct the original pilot for Gilligan's Island although he later reshot it.) Rich said he was dissatisfied with the script, had it rewritten, was still dissatisfied, and so rewrote the script himself.

Rich says the lead role was offered to Peter Falk, who turned it down as he felt with the large cast and multiple storylines he would not be able to make an impression. He was replaced by George Segal, who came out to Hollywood from New York to star in a TV series that had been cancelled after four episodes. Columbia signed Segal to a long-term contract.

James MacArthur's old role ended up being played by Dean Jones, who had just made Under the Yum Yum Tree for Columbia. A key female role was given to Inger Stevens, who was then appearing in the TV series The Farmer's Daughter.

Michael Callan and Stefanie Powers, under contract to Columbia, reprised their role from the original. Callan signed a six-picture deal with Columbia.

== Reception ==
Filmink called it "far interior to the original".

== Notes ==
- Rich, John (2006). Warm Up the Snake: A Hollywood memoir.
