= The Severed Arm =

- Theatrical release poster
- Directed by: Thomas S. Alderman
- Written by: Thomas S. Alderman; Darrel Presnell
- Produced by: Gary Adelman
- Starring: Deborah Walley; Paul Carr; David G. Cannon; Marvin Kaplan; John Crawford; Vince Martorano
- Music by: Phillan Bishop
- Release date: 1973
- Running time: 92 minutes
- Country: United States
- Language: English

The Severed Arm is a 1973 American horror film co-written and directed by Thomas S. Alderman. The film is noteworthy for containing the first on-screen role of Angus Scrimm. The film also stars Paul Carr and John Crawford.

== Plot ==
Jeff Ashton is at home when a mail carrier delivers a strange package. Upon opening the wrapped item, Ashton is horrified to see it contains a severed human arm. He immediately contacts his friend, Doctor Ray Sanders, and the two discuss an incident five years before when, as part of a group of cave explorers, they were trapped by a cave-in. In order to avoid starvation, the group had cut off the arm of one of their fellow cavers, a man named Ted Rogers, planning to eat it. However, moments after doing so, the entire group was rescued and they quickly concocted a cover story for the authorities, saying that Ted had lost his arm in the cave-in and concealing that they had cut it off with a knife.

Jeff and Ray try to find Ted, enlisting the help of one of their former caver friends, Mark Richards, who is now a police detective. Mark finds Ted's daughter Teddy (named after her father), but she initially refuses to help the group find her father who has now apparently disappeared. However, after Jeff's friend Herman, another one of the cavers who is now a radio personality, is brutally killed on air during his radio show by having his arm hacked off, Teddy agrees to help the group find her father.

The killings continue until only Jeff and Mark remain. They attempt to trap the killer, who they believe is Ted, but Mark has his arm ripped off after being pushed from a cliff with a rope around his wrist. Jeff is then knocked unconscious by the killer after a struggle. When Jeff awakens, he is in a bare white room and it is revealed that Ted's daughter Teddy was behind the killings. Her plan was for her brother Roger, masquerading as their father (who is now in fact catatonic) to kill Jeff's friends and then kidnap Jeff, as the original leader of the caving group and who came up with the idea to cut off her father's arm. Jeff is then sealed in a room to starve, with the only way to avoid death being for Jeff to cut off his own arm and eat it. The film ends with Jeff, imprisoned alone, shouting "Never!"

== Cast ==
- Deborah Walley as Teddy Rogers
- Paul Carr as Sergeant Mark Richards
- David G. Cannon as Jeff Ashton
- John Crawford as Doctor Ray Sanders
- Marvin Kaplan as "Mad Man" Herman
- Ray Dannis as Ted Rogers
- Bob Guthrie as Roger Rogers
- Angus Scrimm as Postal carrier (uncredited)

== Release ==
The film was released theatrically in the United States by Media Cinema Group in 1973.

== Home media ==
The film was released on VHS and DVD by various companies, the legality of which pertaining to official licensing rights is in question. In addition, most current releases feature the edited TV version of the film. The fully uncut version was released on VHS by Video Gems in 1981. The film was also released fully uncut on Blu-ray by Vinegar Syndrome.

== See also ==
- List of American films of 1973
