= Moonlight Beach =

Beach in Encinitas, California

Moonlight State Beach
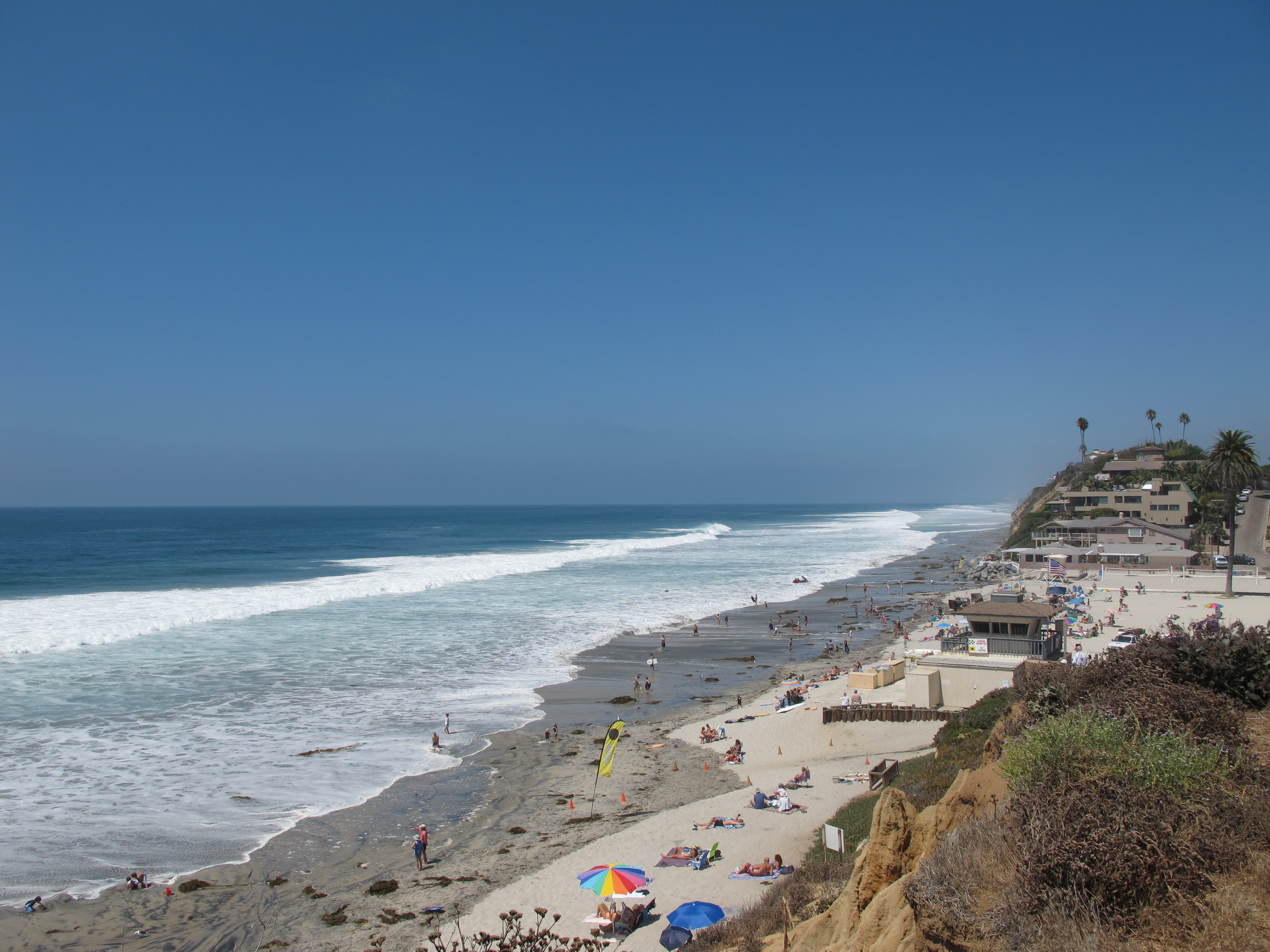
- View of Moonlight Beach looking north from overlook on C Street, 2011

- Location within California Location within the United States
- Location: San Diego County, California
- Nearest city: Encinitas
- Coordinates: 33°2′51″N 117°17′51″W
- Governing body: California Department of Parks and Recreation

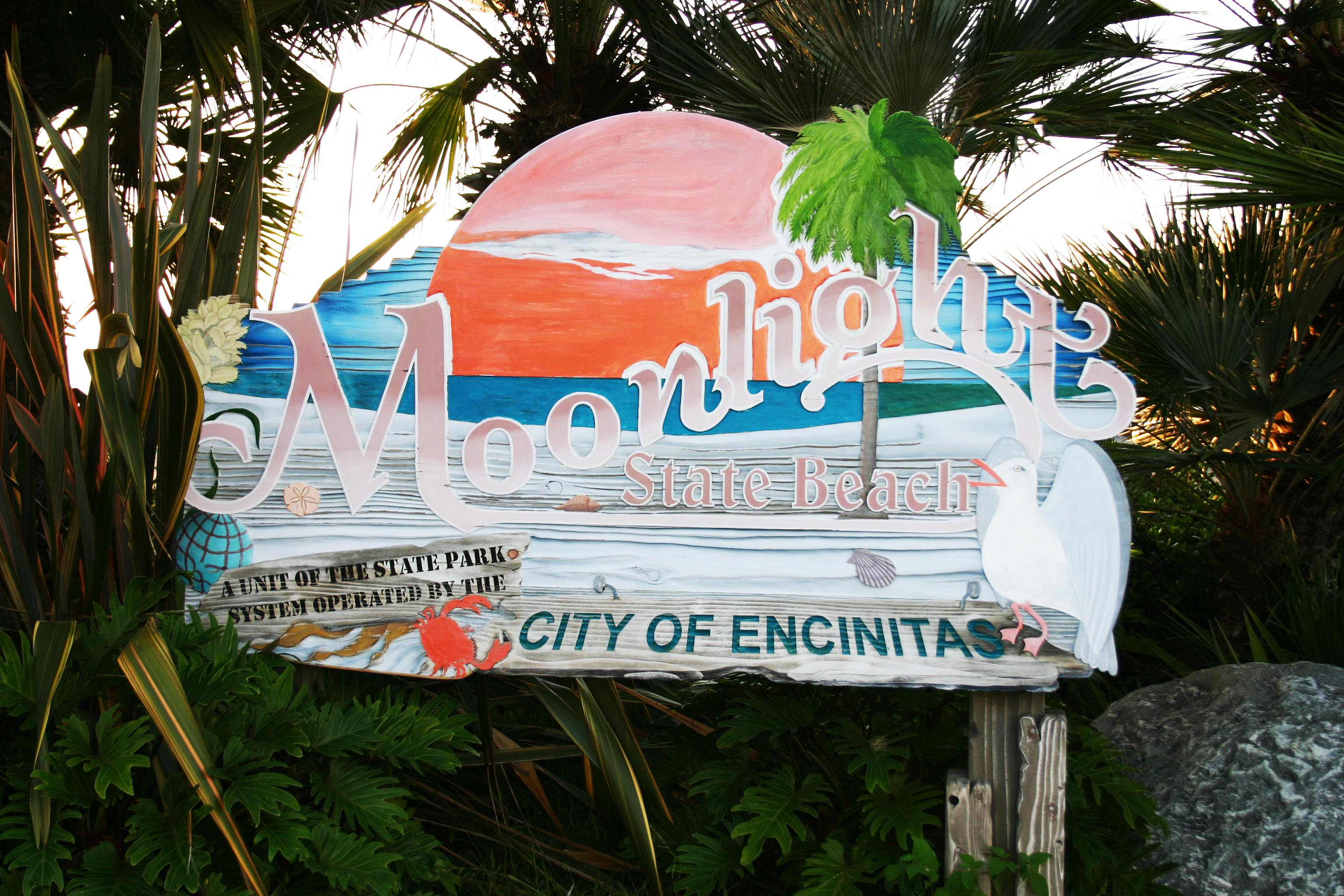
Signboard at entrance to beach, 2010

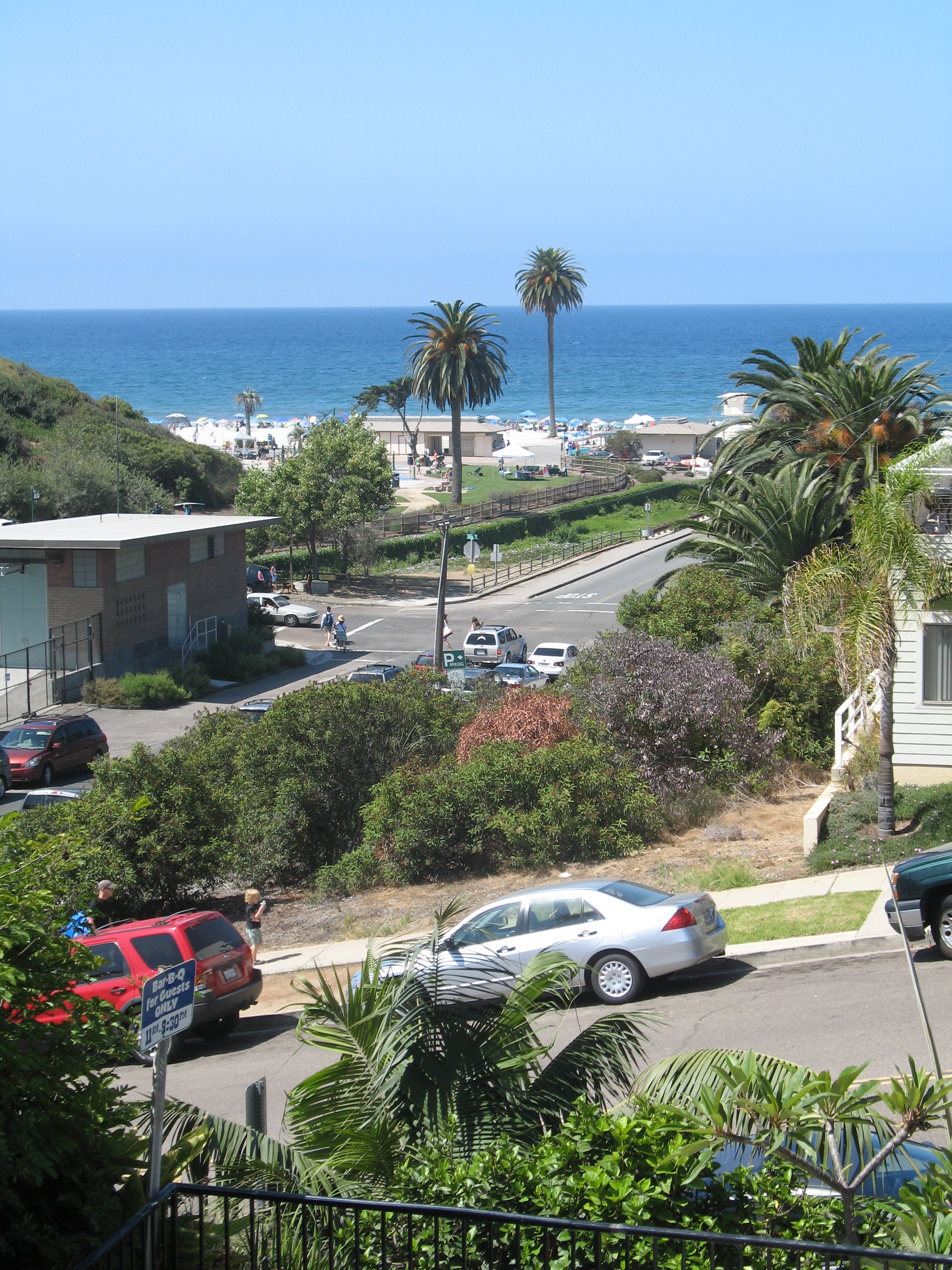
A view of Moonlight Beach from the second floor of the Moonlight Beach Motel, 2009

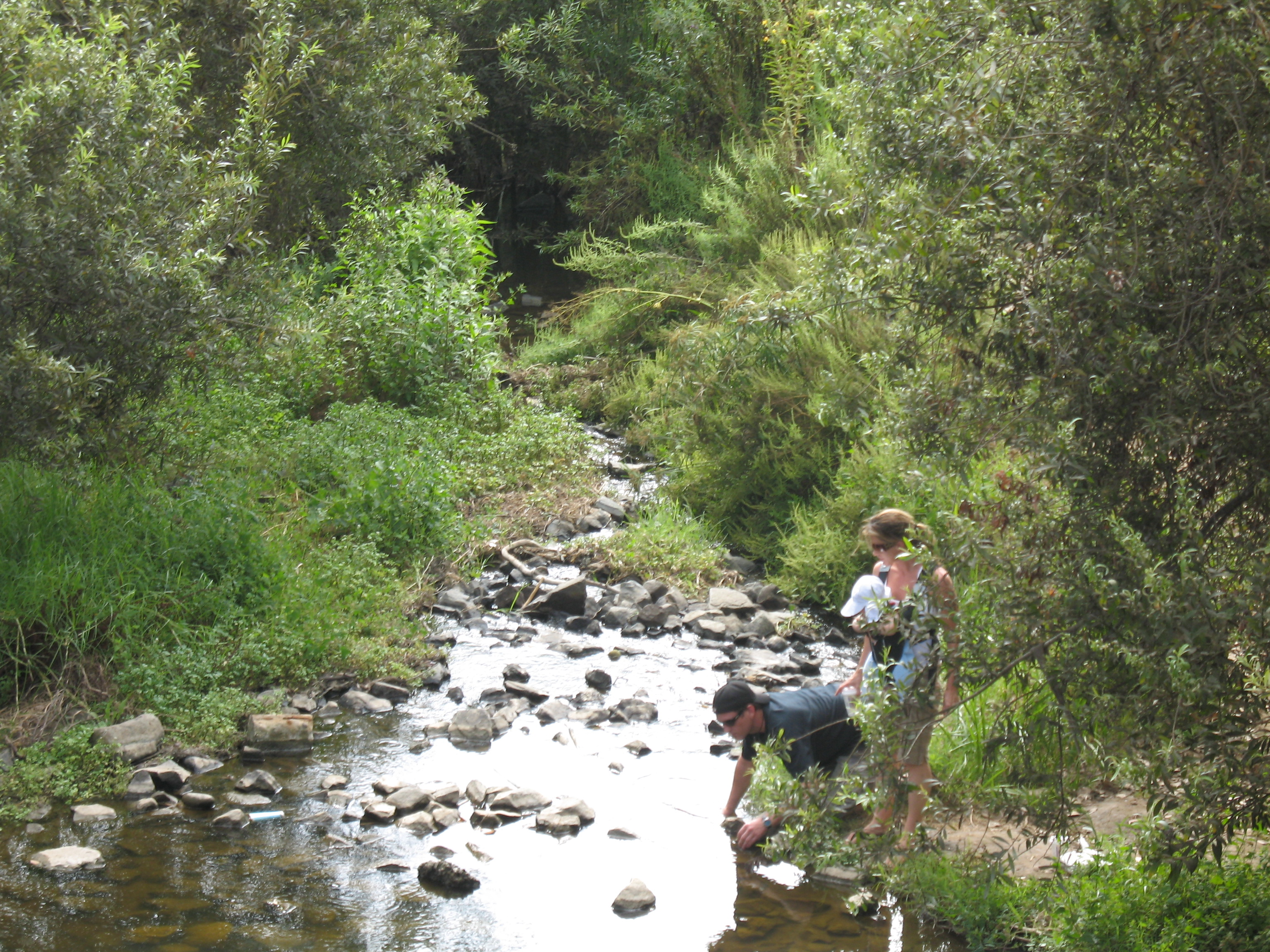
A 2007 view from Highway 101 of the creek within Cottonwood Creek at Moonlight Beach. The creek runs into Moonlight Beach on the north side. 2007.

Moonlight State Beach is a state beach in Encinitas, California. It is located one fifth of one mile beyond the point where Encinitas Boulevard turns into B Street after it crosses Highway 101.

The beach area is well equipped for both children's and adults' recreation. It is popular with both tourists and residents, and it is one of the most visited beaches in Encinitas. This sand beach is used for surfing, swimming, surf fishing, beach volleyball, and bonfires.

== History ==
Early female settlers washed clothing in nearby Cottonwood Creek, then provided picnics for their families while the laundry dried. Land prospector J. S. Pitcher, who owned much of Encinitas, built a bathhouse, playground, boardwalk, dance hall, and several picnic areas. Between 1915 and 1925, Moonlight Beach began to attract North County residents for social outings. Popular events included horse races. At that time, during low tide, one could drive a Model T north on the beach all the way to Oceanside.

== Surfing ==
Linda Benson, five-time women's world surfing champion, who learned to surf at Moonlight Beach in the late 1950s, says that "Moonlight Beach is not a great longboard wave anymore. It's changed and it's pretty much a shortboard wave now. It really breaks hard and fast now. It wasn't like that. It was a fun beach break".

The wave breaks best during a southwest swell with a rising tide. The sandbars also have a tremendous impact on the quality of the wave.

== Volleyball ==
Since the early 1950s, two-man volleyball has been played at Moonlight Beach. Several of the players from the Pro Tour practice their game at Moonlight. Originally there was only one court in the middle of the beach, but currently there are three courts at the north end of the beach. Every year since 1964 in the month of October, a Mixed Doubles Volleyball Tournament is held here; many of the top beach players in the world participate.

== Water quality ==
Because of the presence of harmful bacteria in dry-season urban run-off into Cottonwood Creek, a small creek that runs into the ocean at Moonlight Beach, water quality has been an issue at Moonlight Beach in the past, especially after significant rain events. For example, in 2002, the beach earned a "D" grade from "Heal the Bay", a Santa Monica-based nonprofit organization which monitors water quality along the California coast. Water quality in Cottonwood Creek has since however improved significantly because of UV treatment carried out routinely in the urban run-off treatment facility on B Street at 2nd Street; from April 2005 through March 2007, the beach earned five As and one B from Heal the Bay.

== Facilities ==
The beach is open for use all day except between 2 am and 4 am. There is a parking lot above the beach which is open from 5 am to 10 pm. No dogs, alcohol, or glass are allowed on the beach. The lifeguard towers are open from 10 am to 6 pm during the summer months. Facilities at the beach include handicapped access, a picnic area, numerous restrooms, outdoor showers, a telephone, concession stand daily (Easter through Thanksgiving), surfboard and boogie board rental, fire rings, playground equipment, and volleyball courts. A tennis court is available nearby in Cottonwood Creek at Moonlight Beach, a small nature reserve with many native plants.

== Annual events ==
During midsummer, Moonlight Beach hosts Switchfoot's "Bro-Am", a charity event which is a surf contest and a massive beach party hosted by the alternative rock band Switchfoot, and sponsored by Hurley. The event runs over two days (usually a Friday and Saturday) that are filled with music, charity, and surfing on this beach where Switchfoot's lead duo, the Foreman brothers, learned to surf.

On the third Saturday of September each year is an event known as "Wavecrest", a major meet of woodies, which are vintage cars in which the rear portion of the bodywork is made of wood; these vehicles are a traditional part of West Coast surfing culture.

Also during the fall, Moonlight Beach is the venue for the Surfing Madonna 5K/10K & 10 Mile Beach Run/Walk, which is also a charity event that gives the proceeds back to the community for programs such as youth scholarships, free surf camps for special needs kids and the wounded warrior project, as well as marine mammal rescue and recovery equipment. The entire course of the event is on the hard-packed sand, starting and ending in the Moonlight Beach cove. Roughly 8,000 people attend this event each year.

== Live Webcam ==
There is a live webcam with views of the surf at D St., the main beach, and the volleyball courts. The video feed is free and also ad free. Moonlight Beach Webcam

== See also ==
- List of beaches in San Diego County
- List of California state parks
  - California State Beaches

== Notes ==
To the North: Carlsbad State Beach	California beaches	To the South; Swami's
