= The Great Masquerade =

- Promotional advertisement
- Directed by: Alan Ormsby
- Written by: Alan Ormsby; Carolyn Wise
- Produced by: Jack McGowan
- Starring: Kaye Stevens; Roberts Blossom; Gay Perkins; Frank Logan; Robert Perault; Paul Cronin; Anya Ormsby
- Production company: Union Artists Productions
- Release date: 1974
- Running time: 98 minutes
- Country: United States
- Language: English

The Great Masquerade (also known as Murder on the Emerald Seas and The AC/DC Caper) is a 1974 American mystery comedy film directed and co-written by Alan Ormsby, and stars Kaye Stevens, Roberts Blossom, Gay Perkins, Frank Logan, Robert Perault, Paul Cronin, and Anya Ormsby. The film's plot follows a detective who infiltrates a beauty contest aboard a cruise ship in order to solve a series of murders. It was shot in Miami, Florida, and was believed to be lost until circa 2014, when it was released on DVD by Vinegar Syndrome.

== Cast ==
- Kaye Stevens as Officer Fulton
- Roberts Blossom as Sherwood Gates
- Gay Perkins as Lucy McRae
- Frank Logan as Chief Willinghand
- Robert Perault as Dave Collins
- Paul Cronin as Casey
- Anya Ormsby as Cookie
- Dick Sterling as Gregory LaSalle
- Judy LaScala as Rita
- Lee Sandman as Vito
- John DeSanti as Paco (as John Di Santi)
- Jeff Gillen as Fancher
- Jennifer Michalover as Jenny Jordan
- Johnny Weissmuller as Sepy Debronvi
- Henny Youngman as Henny Youngman

== Home media ==
In October 2014, The Great Masquerade was released on DVD by Vinegar Syndrome—under the title Murder on the Emerald Seas—and was sold exclusively at the Cinema Wasteland convention and on the Vinegar Syndrome website, limited to 500 units.
