= Deborah Walley =

American actress (1941–2001)

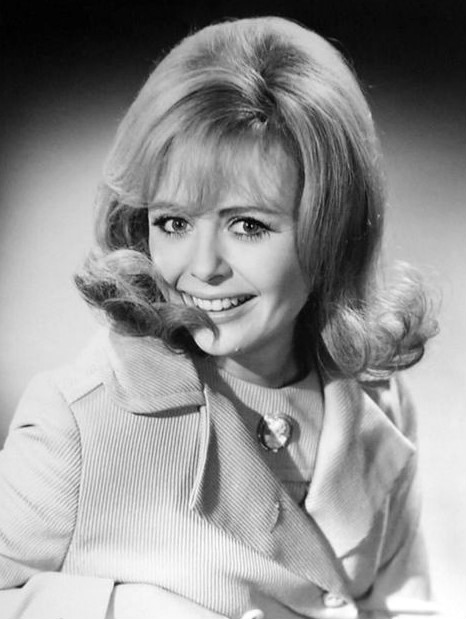
- Walley, late 1960s
- Born: August 12, 1941; Bridgeport, Connecticut, U.S.
- Died: May 10, 2001 (aged 59); Sedona, Arizona, U.S.
- Occupation: Actress
- Years active: 1960–1999
- Known for: Gidget Goes Hawaiian; Spinout; Beach Blanket Bingo; Bon Voyage!; Summer Magic
- Spouses: John Reynolds (m. 19??; div. 19??); John Ashley (m. 1962; div. 1966) Chet McCracken (m. 1968; div. 1975)
- Children: 2

Deborah Walley (August 12, 1941 – May 10, 2001) was an American actress noted for playing the title role in Gidget Goes Hawaiian (1961) and appearing in several beach party films.

== Early years ==
She was born Deborah Edith Walley in Bridgeport, Connecticut, to Ice Capades skating stars and choreographers Nathan and Edith Walley. When she was three years old, she made her first public appearance at Madison Square Garden. After the family's years of travel, with Deborah attending school in New York and then having tutors in Chicago and Los Angeles, Nate and Edith Walley broke up their act and dissolved their marriage when Deborah was 10. "We got along perfectly as a working team," said Mrs. Walley, "but it just didn't work out when I decided to leave the act."

Walley attended Central High School in Bridgeport. In her teens, she decided to pursue a career in acting. At 14, she debuted on stage in a summer stock production of Charley's Aunt.

She studied acting at New York City's American Academy of Dramatic Arts.

== Career ==
=== Early film career ===
Walley was discovered by agent Joyce Selznick while performing in a production of Anton Chekhov's Three Sisters, and she soon made her Hollywood film debut as Gidget in 1961's Gidget Goes Hawaiian. She was reluctant to take the role, as she recounted to interviewer Sharyn Peacocke: "I was this kind of snobby New York actress involved with the Actors Studio, and I felt all my friends would think I was selling out. I had a very low opinion of Hollywood at the time -- which I admit now was a totally distorted picture -- but it wasn't what I wanted. This was going to really mark my career, and take it in a direction that I was really not wanting to go. But of course I couldn't get out of it. I ended up working with some wonderful people like Carl Reiner and Peggy Cass and Jeff Donnell, and a lot of people coming from theater backgrounds, like Michael Callan. I realized that all Hollywood actors hadn't sold out -- there were some really good actors, and it was just a totally different medium that was new to me."

Gidget Goes Hawaiian was popular and established Walley as a name among teenage fans and she won the Photoplay award for Favorite Female Newcomer. She was named Photoplay magazine's most popular actress of 1961. Columbia wanted to bring her back for a sequel, Gidget Goes to Rome, but she couldn't consider it because she was expecting a child.

Disney hired Walley to play an ingenue in two comedies, Bon Voyage! (1962) and Summer Magic (1963), and she sang in the latter.

She appeared in The Young Lovers (1964) for MGM.

Walley signed a contract with American International Pictures, where her husband John Ashley had worked for a number of years. Filmink wrote "As someone with a beach party/Disney heritage, Walley fitted right in to AIP’s style and she was used by the studio as a sort of back up Annette Funicello, i.e. playing nice, straight girls who flirted with the main boy and kept a cool head while mayhem happened around them – though her characters were never as marriage obsessed as Funicello’s." She appeared in several comedies: Beach Blanket Bingo (1965), Ski Party (1965), and Sergeant Dead Head (1965). She sang in some of these films. Walley had a cameo role in Dr. Goldfoot and the Bikini Machine (1966) and was the female lead in the last AIP beach-party film, Ghost in the Invisible Bikini (1966), opposite Tommy Kirk. She reunited with Kirk for a beach-party film directed by Stephanie Rothman titled It's a Bikini World (filmed in 1965, released in 1967).

She next appeared in the Elvis Presley film Spinout, followed by the lead role in the science-fiction film The Bubble (1966).

=== Television ===
Walley guest-starred on Burke's Law ("Who Killed Andy Zygmunt?"), The Greatest Show on Earth ("This Train Don't Stop Till It Gets There"), Wagon Train ("The Nancy Styles Story") and Gomer Pyle: USMC ("Lies, Lies, Lies"), The Men from Shiloh ("With Love, Bullets and Valentines"), Off to See the Wizard ("Rhino") and Love, American Style. Filmink argued "Walley was considered part of an earlier, squarer time and could never make the leap to New Hollywood."

In 1967, with her film career in decline, Walley portrayed Suzie Hubbard Buell in the comedy series The Mothers-in-Law. Actress Kay Cole had played Suzie in the original pilot, but Walley replaced her for the series' two seasons on the air.

Walley worked as an art director on The Courtship of Eddie's Father and an episode of The Girl from U.N.C.L.E. ("The Double-O-Nothing Affair").

Walley appeared on television in episodes of Naked City ("To Walk in Silence ") and Route 66 ("Ten Drops of Water").

=== Later career ===
Walley's later film appearances included Drag Racer (1971), The Severed Arm (1973) and Benji (1974).

She continued to guest-star on shows such as The Hardy Boys/Nancy Drew Mysteries ("Mystery on the Avalanche Express") and Simon & Simon ("The Last Big Break"). She wrote and produced the short film The Legend of Seeks-To-Hunt-Great (1989), which won several awards including the National Cine Golden Eagle, the American Indian Film Festival's best short-subject award, the Oklahoma Tribal Council Award for best fiction film and the 1991 Algrave International Video Festival's best-of-festival award.

Walley moved to Sedona, Arizona in 1991 to focus on raising her family while writing and producing. She cofounded Pied Piper Productions, a nonprofit theater company for children, and was a cofounder of the Sedona Children's Theater.

She published her first book, Grandfather's Good Medicine, in 1993, which was based on the plot of The Legend of Seeks-To-Hunt-Great. She also wrote scripts and taught acting and production techniques to American Indians through her Swiftwind Productions company, and she continued to produce and appear in plays.

Walley returned to Hollywood in 1999, where she pursued acting as a "hobby." She appeared on Baywatch and the daytime soap opera Passions. She continued to work with children through her Imagination Playshops, acting workshops for children in the U.S. and Australia. She also worked with the Educational Theater Company, a multiethnic organization based in Los Angeles.

== Personal life and death ==
Walley's first marriage was to John Reynolds, with whom she had a son named Justin. From 1962 to 1966, (Note: Walley's obituary in The Telegraph says, "She married John Ashley in 1961.") Walley was married to actor John Ashley and had another son, Anthony. (Note: Walley's obituary in The Telegraph says, "They had three sons.") Two years after divorcing Ashley, she married Chet McCracken, with whom she remained until divorcing him in 1975.

In May 2001, Walley died of oesophageal cancer at her home in Sedona, Arizona, at age 59.

== Filmography ==
=== Film ===
Year	Title	Role	Notes
1961	Gidget Goes Hawaiian	Frances "Gidget" Lawrence	
1962	Bon Voyage!	Amy Willard	
1963	Summer Magic	Julia Carey	
1964	The Young Lovers	Debbie	
1965	Beach Blanket Bingo	Bonnie Graham	
1965	Ski Party	Linda Hughes	
1965	Sergeant Deadhead	Airman Lucy Turner	
1965	Dr. Goldfoot and the Bikini Machine	Cafeteria Date	
1966	The Ghost in the Invisible Bikini	Lili Morton	
1966	Spinout	Les	
1966	The Bubble	Catherine	
1967	It's a Bikini World	Delilah Dawes	
1972	Drag Racer	Chris	
1973	The Severed Arm	Teddy Rogers	
1974	Benji	Linda Sue	

=== Television ===
Year	Title	Role	Notes
1960	Naked City	Heather Weston	Episode: "To Walk in Silence"
1960	Route 66	Helen Paige	Episode: "Ten Drops of Water"
1964	Burke's Law	Gwenny Trent	Episode: "Who Killed Andy Zygmunt?"
1964	The Greatest Show on Earth	Anne	Episode: "This Train Don't Stop Till It Gets There"
1964	Wagon Train	Nancy Styles	Episode: "The Nancy Styles Story"
1966	Gomer Pyle, U.S.M.C.	Tina Tracy	Episode: "Lies, Lies, Lies"
1967	Off to See the Wizard	Elizabeth	Episode: "Rhino"
1967–1969	The Mothers-in-Law	Suzie Hubbard Buell	56 episodes
1970	The Virginian	Corey Ann Skeet	Episode: "With Love, Bullets and Valentines"
1971–1972	Love, American Style	Helen / Nina	2 episodes
1978	The Hardy Boys/Nancy Drew Mysteries	Gina Bartelli	Episode: "Mystery on the Avalanche Express"
1986	Simon & Simon	Gigi Dolores	Episode: "The Last Big Break"
1989–1990	Chip 'n Dale: Rescue Rangers	Foxglove / Lahwhinie / Buffy Ratskiwatski	3 episodes (voice)
1999	Baywatch	Ethel	Episode: "Baywatch Grand Prix"
