= Gidget Goes Hawaiian =

1961 film by Paul Wendkos

- 1961 theatrical poster
- Directed by: Paul Wendkos
- Written by: Ruth Brooks Flippen
- Based on: Frederick Kohner (based upon on characters created by)
- Produced by: Jerry Bresler
- Starring: James Darren; Michael Callan; Deborah Walley
- Cinematography: Robert J. Bronner
- Edited by: William A. Lyon
- Music by: George Duning
- Color process: Eastmancolor
- Production company: Jerry Bresler Productions
- Distributed by: Columbia Pictures
- Release date: June 2, 1961
- Running time: 101 minutes
- Country: United States
- Language: English
- Box office: $2.2 million (US rentals)

Gidget Goes Hawaiian is a 1961 American romantic comedy musical film starring James Darren, Michael Callan and Deborah Walley. Released by Columbia Pictures, the film is a sequel to the 1959 Sandra Dee beach film vehicle Gidget. Although she was interested in reprising her role as Gidget, Sandra Dee was unable to do so because Columbia Pictures had only borrowed her from Universal Pictures for the original 1959 film; Universal refused to release her under her contract so she could star in their own series film, Tammy Tell Me True (1961).

The sequel expands the archetypal high school teen surfer girl's romance with her college sweetheart Moondoggie. The film is the second of three Gidget films directed by Paul Wendkos. The screenplay was written by Ruth Brooks Flippen based on characters created by Frederick Kohner, who wrote the novelization of the film in 1961. James Darren reprised his 1959 role of Moondoggie. A third film, Gidget Goes to Rome, followed in 1963. Gidget Goes Hawaiian has been released to VHS and DVD.

== Plot ==
Gidget's father announces that they are going to Hawaii for two weeks. On the plane to Hawaii, Gidget meets Abby Stewart and her parents, popular dancer Eddie Horner, and several more boys. Missing her boyfriend Jeff "Moondoggie" Matthews, Gidget mopes in her room. Her father sends for Jeff, suggesting that he come to Hawaii to surprise Gidget. That night, Abby invites Gidget to join her and Eddie. When Gidget makes a big hit with the boys and dances with Eddie, she inadvertently becomes Abby's rival.

Gidget makes an even bigger impression surfing the next day, leading to an unexpected kiss from Eddie just as Jeff arrives. The two argue and finally decide to go their separate ways. That night at dinner, Jeff arrives with Abby and Gidget retaliates by flirting with Eddie. The contest continues through water-skiing and other activities until Abby, fed up and jealous, decides to spread a rumor that Gidget has slept with Eddie and other guys. Abby's mother relays this gossip to Gidget's mother, quickly leading to arguments between the two, between Gidget and her parents, and finally between both married couples. Gidget's father finds himself drinking with Abby's mother in the hotel bar, while Abby's father and Gidget's mother also make peace. The two mismatched couples eventually meet and resolve their respective disputes.

At the evening Lūʻau, Abby tells Jeff about the rumor that Gidget sleeps around, admitting that it's a lie. Jeff and Gidget reconcile on the beach and head back to the hotel to straighten everything out with the adults. Through a few mix-ups, Gidget believes her parents are cheating on each other with Abby's parents, and Gidget's parents believe Gidget's gone missing. Soon, everybody is gathered in Gidget's room, unaware that Gidget is just down the hall in her parents' suite with Jeff waiting for them. Gidget tries to cover for each of her parents' apparent indiscretions, but soon all misunderstandings are cleared up. Gidget and Jeff also explain their relationship to Eddie and the rest of the gang. The next day, as punishment for spreading the rumor, the guys drag a terrified Abby into the ocean and place her on Gidget's surfboard. When the surf comes rolling in, Abby frantically clings on for dear life while Gidget and Jeff enjoy riding the waves.

== Cast ==
- James Darren as Moondoggie (Jeffrey Matthews)
- Michael Callan as Eddie Horner
- Deborah Walley as Gidget (Frances Lawrence)
- Carl Reiner as Russ Lawrence
- Peggy Cass as Mitzi Stewart
- Eddie Foy Jr. as Monty Stewart
- Jeff Donnell as Dorothy Lawrence
- Vicki Trickett as Abby Stewart
- Joby Baker as Judge Hamilton
- Don Edmonds as Larry Neal
- Bart Patton as Wally Hodges
- Jan Conaway as Barbara Jo Wells
- Robin Lory as Dee Dee Waters
- Arnold Merritt as Clay Anderson

== Production notes ==
From over 150 actresses, Columbia chose Deborah Walley for her screen debut as the new Gidget. Agent Joyce Selznick discovered Walley performing in an off Broadway production of Chekhov's Three Sisters.

Director Paul Wendkos established Walley as the new Gidget with some scenes from the first film re-shot using the new cast as flashbacks. Michael Callan was also under contract to the studio.

The film was shot on location at the Royal Hawaiian Hotel. Deborah Walley was doubled in surfing by Linda Benson.

Not long after the Lawrence family arrives in Hawaii, Gidget's father, Russ Lawrence, realizes that Gidget is sad because she misses her boyfriend Moondoggie (Jeffrey Mathews). At about 24 minutes into the movie, Lawrence sends a Western Union radiogram to Moondoggie, who is staying with his friend Clay Anderson for the summer. Lawrence's goal is to encourage Moondoggie to come to Hawaii ("Gidget is miserable, please..."). The radiogram is addressed as follows: "Jeffrey Mathews, c/o Andersons, 1000 Linda Flora Dr., Los Angeles". 1000 Linda Flora Dr. was the address of the house in Los Angeles where Ruth Brooks Flippen, who wrote the screenplay for the movie, lived with her husband, actor Jay C. Flippen.

== Reception ==
English filmmaker Chris Petit included the film on his ballot for the Sight and Sound Greatest Films of All Time 2022 directors' poll.
