= Medfield (disambiguation) =

Medfield may refer to:

== Places in the United States ==
- Medfield, Massachusetts, a town
  - Medfield (CDP), Massachusetts, census-designated place comprising the town center
- Medfield, Baltimore, Maryland, a neighborhood
- Medfield College, a fictional American college featured in the live action Disney movies The Absent-Minded Professor, Son of Flubber, The Computer Wore Tennis Shoes, Now You See Him, Now You Don't, and The Strongest Man in the World.

== Other uses ==
- Medfield (system on chip), code name for an Intel Atom system on chip platform
