= Dexter Riley =

American film series

- Official home video release box set collection artwork.
- Based on: Characters created by Joseph L. McEveety
- Starring: Kurt Russell; Cesar Romero; Joe Flynn; (See cast list)
- Country: United States
- Language: English
- Box office: $16,710,000 (total of three films)

The Dexter Riley film series consists of American science fiction-comedy films, centered on a college student played by Kurt Russell. The films, produced by The Walt Disney Company and taking place at the fictional Medfield College, follow the science class led by Professor Quigley, and their experiments, projects, and adventures. The college, under the direction of Dean Eugene Higgins (Joe Flynn) becomes involved in the nefarious plans of millionaire-turned-criminal, A. J. Arno (Cesar Romero).

The film trilogy received mixed reviews, while its television film remake was poorly received. The original trilogy has acquired a cult classic status. In 1999 the Dexter Riley trilogy, along with a number of other Disney film series, were expanded as a franchise into the Walt Disney Parks attraction with elements included from each film.

== Films ==
| Title | U.S. release date | Director | Screenwriter(s) | Story by | Producer |
|---|---|---|---|---|---|
| The Computer Wore Tennis Shoes | December 31, 1969 | Robert Butler | Joseph L. McEveety | | Bill Anderson |
| Now You See Him, Now You Don't | July 12, 1972 | Robert Butler | Joseph L. McEveety | Robert L. King | Ron Miller |
| The Strongest Man in the World | February 6, 1975 | Vincent McEveety | Joseph L. McEveety and Herman Groves | | Bill Anderson |

=== The Computer Wore Tennis Shoes (1969) ===
At Medfield College, a non-intellectual named Dexter Riley becomes brilliant overnight. Following an electrical accident that transfers a donated computer memory into his brain, he gains the ability to learn any knowledge instantly and perfectly. After Riley gains fame and attention via television appearances, the dean of a competing university decides to ruin his reputation. At the same time, A. J. Arno, a secret technological crime boss with an upstanding public persona, pursues the student and his school because the computer he donated-that is now integrated into Riley's DNA-holds the records of his nefarious acts.

=== Now You See Him, Now You Don't (1972) ===
Dexter Riley is a science student at Medfield College who accidentally invents a liquid capable of rendering objects and people invisible. As Dexter and his friends Debbie and Richard begin exploring their recent discovery, the product gains the unwanted attention of corrupt businessman A. J. Arno. Recently released from prison, Arno seeks the formula for criminal means before the students can even announce their discovery. Arno and his henchman plan to use the invisibility spray to rob a bank.

=== The Strongest Man in the World (1975) ===
Dexter Riley, who is studying science at Medfield College, decides to create a formula that will make humans stronger. After several unsuccessful attempts, a laboratory mishap combines his formula with a vitamin-rich breakfast cereal. He and his classmates discover that eating it briefly provides superhuman levels of strength and endurance. The greedy college dean attempts to take advantage of the discovery, marketing the product to a cereal corporation. Competing cereal companies hire thugs, including A. J. Arno, to eliminate the new miracle product.

== Television ==
| Title | U.S. release date | Director | Screenwriters | Story by | Producer |
|---|---|---|---|---|---|
| Disney's The Computer Wore Tennis Shoes | February 18, 1995 | Peyton Reed | Joseph L. McEveety and Ryan Rowe | Joseph L. McEveety | Joseph B. Wallenstein |

During the late 1980s and early 1990s, a number of made-for-television remake films of classic Walt Disney Productions were produced and released as a part of The Magical World of Disney series. Among them was The Computer Wore Tennis Shoes.

After a laboratory accident, the contents of a computer's encyclopedia is transferred biochemically into the brain of Dexter Riley, a less-than-average college student. After his newly acquired genius he appears on a trivia show, competing between various universities. After acing the show's quiz, and acquiring all the points, another university finds out about how he attained his skills and does everything to discredit Dexter.

== Principal cast and characters ==
List indicator

This section includes characters who will appear or have appeared in the franchise in main roles.

- An empty grey cell indicates the character was not in the film, or that the character's official presence has not yet been confirmed.

| Character | Films | | | Television |
| Character | The Computer Wore Tennis Shoes | Now You See Him, Now You Don't | The Strongest Man in the World | Disney's The Computer Wore Tennis Shoes |
|---|---|---|---|---|
| Dexter Riley | Kurt Russell | Kurt Russell | Kurt Russell | Kirk Cameron |
| Dean Eugene "E. J. Gene" Higgins | Joe Flynn | Joe Flynn | Joe Flynn | |
| A. J. Arno | Cesar Romero | Cesar Romero | Cesar Romero | |
| Professor Miles Quigley | William Schallert | | William Schallert | Jason Bernard |
| Richard Schuyler | Michael McGreevey | Michael McGreevey | Michael McGreevey | |
| Debbie Dawson | | Joyce Menges | Ann Marshall | |
| Harriet Crumply | | | Eve Arden | |
| Kirkwood Krinkle | | | Phil Silvers | |
| Cookie / Chillie | Richard Bakalyan | Richard Bakalyan | Richard Bakalyan | |
| Dean Al Valentine | | | | Larry Miller |
| Dean Webster Carlson | | | | Dean Jones |
| Norwood Gills | | | | Matthew McCurley |

== Additional crew and production details ==
| Film | Crew/Detail | | | | | |
| Film | Composer | Cinematographer | Editor | Production companies | Distributing companies | Running time |
|---|---|---|---|---|---|---|
| The Computer Wore Tennis Shoes | Robert F. Brunner | Frank V. Phillips | Cotton Warburton | Walt Disney Productions | Buena Vista Distribution Company | 1hr 31mins |
| Now You See Him, Now You Don't | Robert F. Brunner | Frank V. Phillips | Cotton Warburton | Walt Disney Productions | Buena Vista Distribution Company | 1hr 28mins |
| The Strongest Man in the World | Robert F. Brunner | Andrew Jackson | Cotton Warburton | Walt Disney Productions | Buena Vista Distribution Company | 1hr 32mins |
| Disney's The Computer Wore Tennis Shoes | Philip Giffin | Russ T. Alsobrook | Jeff Gourson | Walt Disney Television, ZM Productions | American Broadcasting Company, Buena Vista Television | 1hr 27mins |

== Reception ==
=== Box office and financial performance ===
| Film | Box office gross | | | Box office ranking | | Budget | Worldwide Total income | Ref. |
| Film | North America | Other territories | Worldwide | All time North America | All time worldwide | Budget | Worldwide Total income | Ref. |
|---|---|---|---|---|---|---|---|---|
| The Computer Wore Tennis Shoes | —N/a | —N/a | —N/a | —N/a | —N/a | —N/a | $5,500,000 | |
| Now You See Him, Now You Don't | —N/a | —N/a | —N/a | —N/a | —N/a | —N/a | $4,610,000 | |
| The Strongest Man in the World | —N/a | —N/a | —N/a | —N/a | —N/a | —N/a | $6,600,000 | |
| Totals | | | | | | | $16,710,000 (Note: These numbers is an approximate calculation of the total income The Walt Disney Company made of film rentals. Box office numbers are not available from the company.) | |

=== Critical response ===
| Film | Rotten Tomatoes | Metacritic |
|---|---|---|
| The Computer Wore Tennis Shoes | 50% (6 reviews) | 54 (4 reviews) |
| Now You See Him, Now You Don't | 80% (5 reviews) | —N/a |
| The Strongest Man in the World | —N/a | 63 (4 reviews) |
| Disney's The Computer Wore Tennis Shoes | —N/a | —N/a |

== Theme park attraction ==
In 1999, the theme of Journey into Imagination was changed and re-titled to include Figment. The ride features Dr. Nigel Channing, from Honey, I Shrunk the Audience!, who "hosts" an area known as the Imagination Institute. The story states that Channing's grandfather established the institute, while the area features references to Dean Higgins from the Dexter Riley films, as well as Wayne Szalinski from the Honey, I Shrunk the Kids franchise, and Dr. Philip Brainard from Flubber. Walt Disney and Thomas Edison also make an appearance.

== Related films ==
The Dexter Riley film series takes place at Medfield College. The college is used as a primary location in two other Disney film franchises: The Shaggy Dog and the Flubber film series. Collectively, the three separate film series take place within the same fictional universe. Additionally, the Merlin Jones film series take place at the in-universe sister-school, Midvale College, while The World's Greatest Athlete is set at the related academic school of Merrivale College.

| Film | U.S. release date | Director | Screenwriter(s) | Story by | Producer(s) |
The Shaggy Dog film series
| The Shaggy Dog | March 19, 1959 | Charles Barton | Lillie Hayward and Bill Walsh | Lillie Hayward and Bill Walsh | Walt Disney and Bill Walsh |
| The Shaggy D.A. | December 17, 1976 | Robert Stevenson | Don Tait | Don Tait | Bill Anderson |
| The Return of the Shaggy Dog | November 1, 1987 | Stuart Gillard | Paul Haggis and Diane Wilk | Paul Haggis and Diane Wilk | Harvey Marks |
| The Shaggy Dog | March 10, 2006 | Brian Robbins | Cormac Wibberley and Marianne Wibberley and Geoff Rodkey and Jack Amiel and Michael Begler | | David Hoberman and Tim Allen |
Flubber film series
| The Absent-Minded Professor | March 16, 1961 | Robert Stevenson | Bill Walsh | Bill Walsh | Bill Walsh |
| Son of Flubber | January 16, 1963 | Robert Stevenson | Bill Walsh and Don DaGradi | Bill Walsh and Don DaGradi | Walt Disney and Bill Walsh |
| Flubber | November 26, 1997 | Les Mayfield | John Hughes | John Hughes | John Hughes and Ricardo Mestres |
Merlin Jones film series
| The Misadventures of Merlin Jones | February 11, 1964 | Robert Stevenson | Tom August & Helen August | Bill Walsh | Walt Disney and Ron Miller |
| The Monkey's Uncle | August 18, 1965 | Robert Stevenson | Tom August & Helen August | Tom August & Helen August | Walt Disney and Ron Miller |
Other films
| The World's Greatest Athlete | February 1, 1973 | Robert Scheerer | Dee Caruso and Gerald Gardner | Dee Caruso and Gerald Gardner | Bill Walsh |
