= James Westerfield =

American actor (1913–1971)

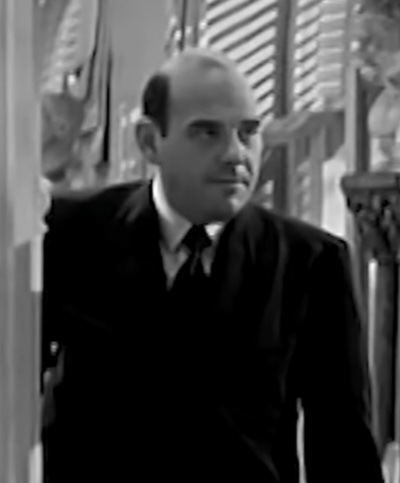
- Westerfield on The Chase (1946)
- Born: James A. Westerfield; March 22, 1913; Nashville, Tennessee, U.S.
- Died: September 20, 1971 (aged 58); Woodland Hills, Los Angeles, California, U.S.
- Occupation: Actor
- Years active: 1940–1971
- Spouse(s): Frances Lansing (1950s); Alice G. Fay (1962–1971) his death

James A. Westerfield (March 22, 1913 – September 20, 1971) was an American character actor of stage, film, and television.

== Early life ==
Westerfield was born in Nashville, Tennessee, to candy-maker Brasher Omier Westerfield and his wife Dora Elizabeth Bailey. He was raised in Detroit, Michigan.

== Career ==
=== Stage ===
Westerfield became interested in theatre as a young man and in the 1930s joined Gilmor Brown's famed Pasadena Community Playhouse, appearing in dozens of plays. He played in numerous films following his screen debut in 1940, then went to New York City and performed on Broadway, winning two New York Drama Critics' Circle Awards for his supporting roles in The Madwoman of Chaillot and Detective Story. He then returned to Hollywood and was cast in more than 40 additional films.

Despite his growing involvement acting in motion pictures and later in television productions, Westerfield maintained an active interest in the theatre for the remainder of his career. He directed more than 50 musicals in a summer-musical tent he owned in Danbury, Connecticut, and was the original stage director and producer for the Greek Theatre in Los Angeles. He directed three seasons of "Theatre Under the Stars" in Vancouver, British Columbia, and appeared in musical roles with the Detroit Civic Light Opera, the Los Angeles Civic Light Opera, and the San Francisco Civic Light Opera. He also was active in the Gaetano Merola Opera Company in San Francisco in the early 1940s.

=== Film ===
On film, Westerfield had roles in The Magnificent Ambersons (1942), On the Waterfront (1954), Lucy Gallant (1955), the 1957 Budd Boetticher-directed Western Decision at Sundown starring Randolph Scott, Cowboy (1958), a repeating role in The Shaggy Dog, The Absent-Minded Professor (1961) and its sequel Son of Flubber (1963), Birdman of Alcatraz (1962), Man's Favorite Sport (1964), The Sons of Katie Elder (1965), Hang 'Em High (1968), and True Grit (1969).

=== Television ===
Westerfield had many roles on television, including seven episodes as John Murrel from 1963 to 1964 on ABC's The Travels of Jaimie McPheeters, starring child actor Kurt Russell in the title role. He made two guest appearances on Perry Mason, including the role of Sheriff Bert Elmore in the 1957 episode "The Case of the Angry Mourner", as well as in the role of murder victim Roger Quigley in the 1961 episode "The Case of the Resolute Reformer". He also appears in the 1954 episode "Texas Draw" on the Western The Lone Ranger.

Some other examples of Westerfield's work on television include performances on series such as The Rifleman, The Californians, Richard Diamond, Private Detective, Mike Hammer, The Alaskans, The Rebel, Straightaway, Going My Way, The Asphalt Jungle, Hazel, The Twilight Zone, The Big Valley, The Andy Griffith Show, Daniel Boone, The Beverly Hillbillies, two episodes of Maverick, and four episodes of Gunsmoke. He played the circus leader, Dr. Marvello, in an episode of Lost in Space "Space Circus" (1966), My Three Sons "A horse for Uncle Charlie" (1968).

== Personal life and death ==
Westerfield as a young man was a roommate of fellow Pasadena Playhouse actor George Reeves. The two remained close friends until Reeves's death in 1959.

In the 1950s, Westerfield's wife was the former Frances Lansing, who had been an actress. Later, Westerfield was married to Alice G. Fay (an actress under the name Fay Tracey).

Westerfield died from a heart attack in Woodland Hills, California, at the age of 58.

== Selected filmography ==
- The Howards of Virginia (1940) - Backwoodsman (film debut, uncredited)
- Highway West (1941) - Swede, Trucker at Cafe
- The Bashful Bachelor (1942) - Carnival Pitchman (uncredited)
- About Face (1942) - Soldier with Daisy (uncredited)
- The Magnificent Ambersons (1942) - Policeman at Accident (uncredited)
- The Pride of the Yankees (1942) - Spectator (uncredited)
- Timber (1942) - Lumberjack (uncredited)
- Around the World (1943) - Bashful Marine (uncredited)
- Since You Went Away (1944) - Convalescent on Rehab Steps (uncredited)
- O.S.S. (1946) - Detective Roberts (uncredited)
- Undercurrent (1946) - Henry Gilson
- The Chase (1946) - Job the Butler
- Side Street (1950) - Patrolman Charlie (uncredited)
- Ma and Pa Kettle Go to Town (1950) - Harvey, Zoo Attendant (uncredited)
- The Whistle at Eaton Falls (1951) - Joe London
- On The Waterfront (1954) - Big Mac
- Three Hours to Kill (1954) - Sam Minor
- The Human Jungle (1954) - Police Captain Marty Harrison
- The Violent Men (1954) - Sheriff Magruder
- Chief Crazy Horse (1955) - Caleb Mantz
- Cell 2455, Death Row (1955) - Red (uncredited)
- The Cobweb (1955) - James Petlee
- The Scarlet Coat (1955) - Colonel Jameson
- Lucy Gallant (1955) - Harry Wilson
- Man with the Gun (1955) - Mr. Zender
- Away All Boats (1956) - 'Boats' Torgeson
- Three Brave Men (1956) - Chief of Police Timothy Aloysius O'Reilly
- Jungle Heat (1957) - Harvey Mathews
- Decision at Sundown (1957) - Otis
- Alfred Hitchcock Presents (1958) (S4:E8, "Safety for the Witness") - Police Commissioner Cummings
- Cowboy (1958) - Mike Adams
- The Proud Rebel (1958) - Birm Bates
- The Walter Winchell File (1958) "The Window" - Joe Vivianno
- Tales of Wells Fargo (1959) "Relay Station" S4.E16 - Henry Brock
- The Hangman (1959) - Herb Loftus
- The Shaggy Dog (1959) - Officer Hanson
- The Gunfight at Dodge City (1959) - Reverend Howard
- Alfred Hitchcock Presents (1960) (Season 5 Episode 34: "Cell 227") - Pops Lafferty
- New Comedy Showcase (1960) (Season 1 Episode 3: "They Went Thataway") - Black Ace Burton
- Wild River (1960) - Cal Garth
- The Plunderers (1960) - Mike Baron, Saloon Owner
- Bonanza (1960-1970, two episodes) - Sheriff John Logan / Arthur Blackwell
- The Absent-Minded Professor (1961) - Police Officer Hanson
- Homicidal (1961) - Alfred S. Adrims
- Birdman of Alcatraz (1962) - Jess Younger
- Son of Flubber (1963) - Police Officer Hanson
- Man's Favorite Sport (1964) - Policeman
- Bikini Beach (1964) - Cop #2
- The Sons of Katie Elder (1965) - Mr. Vennar
- That Funny Feeling (1965) - Officer Brokaw
- Lost in Space (1966) - Dr. Marvello
- Dead Heat on a Merry-Go-Round (1966) - Jack Balter
- A Man Called Gannon (1968) - Amos
- Blue (1968) - Abe Parker
- Hang 'Em High (1968) - Prisoner
- Smith! (1969) - Sheriff
- True Grit (1969) - Judge Parker
- The Love God? (1969) - Reverend Wilkerson
- Dead Aim (1971) - John Applebee (final film)
