= Edward Andrews =

American actor (1914–1985)

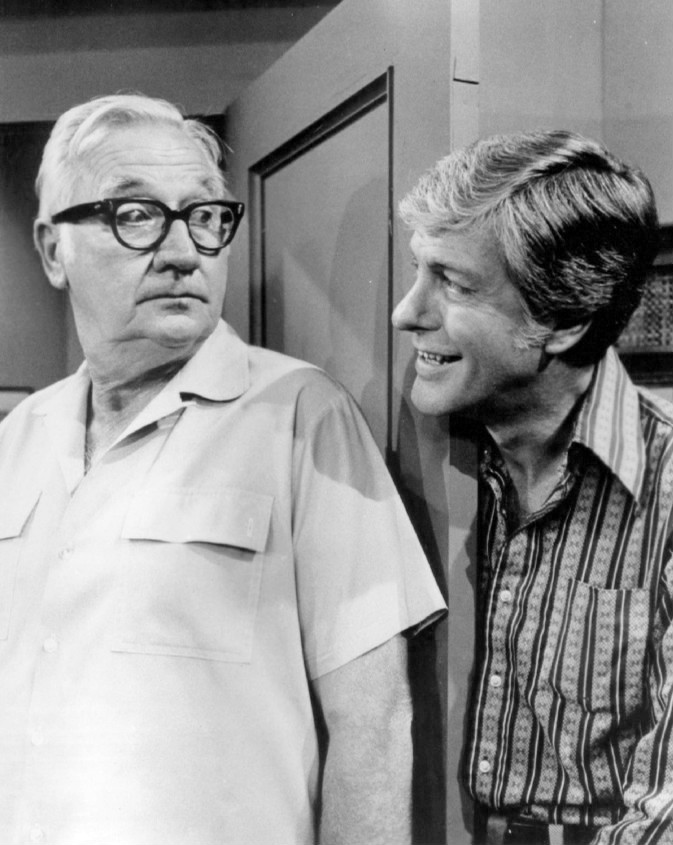
- Andrews (left) and Dick Van Dyke (1973)
- Born: October 9, 1914; Griffin, Georgia, U.S.
- Died: March 8, 1985 (aged 70); Santa Monica, California, U.S.
- Other names: Eddy Andrews, Ed Andrews, Eddie Andrews
- Education: University of Virginia
- Occupation: Actor
- Years active: 1936–1985
- Spouse: Emily Barnes Andrews (m. 1955–1985)
- Children: 3

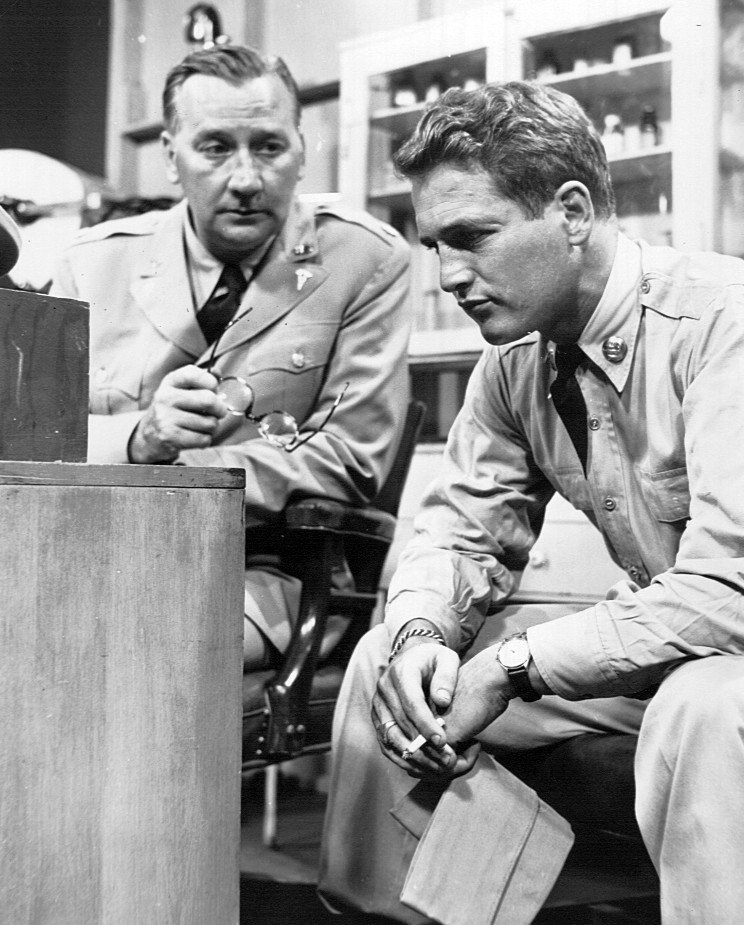
Edward Andrews and Paul Newman from The Kaiser Aluminum Hour presentation of "Army Game".

Edward Bryan Andrews Jr. (October 9, 1914 – March 8, 1985) was an American stage, film and television actor. Andrews was one of the most recognizable character actors on television and in films from the 1950s through the 1980s. Over time his stark white hair, imposing build and horn-rimmed glasses influenced the roles he received, as he was often cast as an ornery boss, a cagey businessman or other officious types.

== Early life ==
Andrews was born in Griffin, Georgia, the son of an Episcopal priest, and was raised in Pittsburgh, Pennsylvania, Cleveland, Ohio, and Wheeling, West Virginia. At the age of 12, he won a walk-on role in a stock theater production featuring James Gleason. He later attended the University of Virginia.

== Career ==
=== Stage ===
Andrews made his stage debut at age 21 in 1935, progressing to Broadway that same year. During this period, Andrews starred in the short-lived but well-received military drama So Proudly We Hail in the lead role opposite Richard Cromwell. In 1936, Andrews debuted in the film Rushin' Art. In 1949 he made a brief, uncredited appearance as a neighbor to David Wayne's character in Adam's Rib. His next film appearance came in 1955 as the subversive and corrupt Rhett Tanner, head of a violent political machine, in The Phenix City Story. This was soon followed by roles in other films such as The Harder They Fall (1956), These Wilder Years (1956), Tea and Sympathy (1956), Tension at Table Rock (1956), The Unguarded Moment (1956), Hot Summer Night (1957), The Tattered Dress (1957), The Fiend Who Walked the West (1958) and Night of the Quarter Moon (1959).

=== Film ===
While Andrews' film acting career began in earnest in his forties, he appeared much older than he actually was and he was consistently typecast as a grandfatherly type. Though he often played amiable characters, Andrews was equally adept at portraying characters such as sleazy businessmen types or uptight bureaucrats.

Andrews appeared in several popular films, including Elmer Gantry (1960) in which he was memorable as George F. Babbitt, The Absent-Minded Professor (1961) and Son of Flubber (1963) as the secretary of defense, The Thrill of It All (1963) with Doris Day and James Garner, Send Me No Flowers (1964) with Doris Day and Rock Hudson and Avanti! (1972) as a government agent. Among his other film credits are The Young Savages (1961), The Young Doctors (1961), Advise & Consent (1962), Good Neighbor Sam (1964), Youngblood Hawke (1964), Kisses for My President (1964), The Glass Bottom Boat (1966); Wild Wild West 2-17-67; The Trouble with Girls (1969) with Elvis Presley, Tora! Tora! Tora! (1970) as Admiral Harold R. Stark, How to Frame a Figg (1971), The Million Dollar Duck (1971), Now You See Him, Now You Don't (1972), Charley and the Angel (1973) and The Seniors (1978). He played Molly Ringwald's grandfather in the John Hughes film Sixteen Candles (1984) before making his final feature-film appearance in Gremlins (1984).

=== Television ===
Andrews guest-starred on many television series including Mama, Thriller, Goodyear Television Playhouse, Hands of Mystery, The United States Steel Hour, Justice (1954 series), Cheyenne, The Twilight Zone (in the episodes "Third From the Sun" and "You Drive"), The Real McCoys, The Eleventh Hour, Route 66, Naked City, Gunsmoke, Rawhide, The Untouchables, Bonanza, Alias Smith and Jones, The Wild Wild West, Ironside, The F.B.I., The Beverly Hillbillies, Mr. Novak, Sanford and Son, One Day at a Time, Love American Style, Ellery Queen, The Invaders, Bewitched, Hawaii Five-O, Charlie's Angels, The Rookies, The Alfred Hitchcock Hour, Storefront Lawyers, The Love Boat, The Andy Griffith Show, Fantasy Island, Three's Company, The Bob Newhart Show and Quincy, M.E..

Television producer Edward Montagne remembered "Eddie Andrews" from his appearances in the military sitcom The Phil Silvers Show (Sergeant Bilko) and cast him as a co-star on the ABC series Broadside (1964–1965) as the rarefied Commander Roger Adrian. "The amusing thing is that Ed Montagne first offered me the Captain Binghamton role in his McHale's Navy and I turned him down," said Andrews in 1965. "After seeing what a wonderful job Joe Flynn is doing with the role, I keep kicking myself for what was apparently a stupid decision. [Broadside] is roughly a distaff version of McHale's Navy. One reason I grabbed onto this series is that finally, I hope, I'll get an identity with exposure every week in the same role."

Andrews had previously filmed the pilot for the popular series Hazel in the role of George Baxter. His was the only role recast when the pilot became a series; he was replaced by movie actor Don DeFore.

Andrews played the character of Charley in the 1966 dramatization of Death of a Salesman, and was active in television productions throughout the early 1980s. He played Elton Dykstra on The Intruders, Ernest W. Stanley in The Man Who Came to Dinner, Mayor Robert Chisholm alongside Don Knotts in the film How to Frame a Figg (1971), and Mayor Massey on the television film The Whiz Kid and the Mystery at Riverton. In 1968, he played a safecracker in a four-part episode of I Dream of Jeannie and in early 1969, he appeared as a drug-dealing mortician on Mod Squad. He also had the lead role as Harry Flood in the NBC short-lived 1979 series Supertrain. In 1982, he appeared in an episode of ABC's Three's Company.

Edward Andrews was also a familiar face in television commercials, advertising various products. In the late 1970s and early 1980s, he appeared in a series of popular commercials for Bell Telephone as an overbearing executive.

== Personal life ==
Andrews's Broadway career was interrupted by military service during World War II. He served as the captain and commanding officer of Battery C within the 751st Field Artillery Battalion of the U.S. Army and was awarded the Bronze Star Medal in September 1945.

Andrews married Emily Barnes in 1955. They had two daughters, Abigail and Tabitha, and a son, Edward III.

Andrews was an avid yachtsman.

Bewitched star Elizabeth Montgomery selected Tabitha as the name for her character's daughter after Andrews' daughter. She said: "The name was my idea. I loved it, because it was so old-fashioned. I got it from one of the daughters of Edward Andrews, the actor. The two Andrews girls are named Tabitha and Abigail."

== Death ==
On March 8, 1985, Andrews suffered a heart attack at his home in Pacific Palisades. He was transported to Santa Monica Hospital where he died later that day at the age of 70. A memorial service was held at St. Matthew's Episcopal Church in Pacific Palisades on March 11. Andrews was later cremated.

== Filmography ==
- The Phenix City Story (1955) – Rhett Tanner
- The Harder They Fall (1956) – Jim Weyerhause
- These Wilder Years (1956) – Leland G. Spottsford
- Tea and Sympathy (1956) – Herb Lee
- Tension at Table Rock (1956) – Kirk
- Friendly Persuasion (1956) – Soldier (uncredited)
- The Unguarded Moment (1956) – Mr. Bennett
- Three Brave Men (1956) – Mayor Henry L. Jensen
- Hot Summer Night (1957) – Deputy Lou Follett
- The Tattered Dress (1957) – Lester Rawlings
- Trooper Hook (1957) – Charlie Travers
- The Fiend Who Walked the West (1958) – Judge Parker
- Night of the Quarter Moon (1959) – Clinton Page
- Elmer Gantry (1960) – George F. Babbitt
- The Absent Minded Professor (1961) – Defense Secretary
- The Young Savages (1961) – R. Daniel Cole
- Love in a Goldfish Bowl (1961) – Sen. Clyde Holloway
- The Young Doctors (1961) – Jim Bannister
- Rawhide (1961) – Ben Andrews in S4:E1, "Incident at Rio Salado"
- Rawhide (1962) – Lije Crowning in S5:E12, "Incident of the Querencias"
- Advise & Consent (1962) – Senator Orrin Knox
- 40 Pounds of Trouble (1962) – Herman
- Son of Flubber (1963) – Defense Secretary
- Bonanza (1963) – T4E16 "Song in the Dark"
- The Thrill of It All (1963) – Gardiner Fraleigh
- The Man from Galveston (1963) – Alonzo Hyde
- The Twilight Zone (1964) – S5:E14 "You Drive" - Oliver Pope
- A Tiger Walks (1964) – Governor Robbins
- The Brass Bottle (1964) – Prof. Kenton
- Good Neighbor Sam (1964) – Mr. Burke
- Kisses for My President (1964) – Sen. Walsh
- Send Me No Flowers (1964) – Dr. Ralph Morrissey
- Youngblood Hawke (1964) – Quentin Judd
- Fluffy (1965) – Griswald
- The Glass Bottom Boat (1966) – Gen. Wallace Bleecker
- Birds Do It (1966) – Gen. Smithburn
- The Hardy Boys: The Mystery of the Chinese Junk (1967) – Dr. Montrose
- The Trouble with Girls (1969) – Johnny
- Tora! Tora! Tora! (1970) – Admiral Harold R. Stark
- The Doris Day Show (1970) – Colonel Fairburn in S2:E16, "Today's World Catches the Measles"
- The Doris Day Show (1970) – Colonel Fairburn in S2:E26, "Colonel Fairburn Takes Over"
- The Doris Day Show (1970) – Colonel Fairburn in S3:E16, "Doris vs. Pollution"
- How to Frame a Figg (1971) – Mayor Robert Chisholm
- The Million Dollar Duck (1971) – Morgan
- The Doris Day Show (1971) – Colonel Fairburn in S3:E21, "Colonel Fairburn Jr."
- The Doris Day Show (1972) – Colonel Fairburn in S5:E13, "The New Boss"
- Now You See Him, Now You Don't (1972) – Mr. Sampson
- Avanti! (1972) – J.J. Blodgett
- Charley and the Angel (1973) – Ernie, Banker
- Wilbur and Orville: The First to Fly (1973)
- The Photographer (1974) – Sgt. Sid Collins
- The Seniors (1978) – The Banker
- Sixteen Candles (1984) – Howard Baker
- Gremlins (1984) – Mr. Roland Corben (final film role)
