= Belle Montrose =

American actress and vaudeville performer (1886-1964)

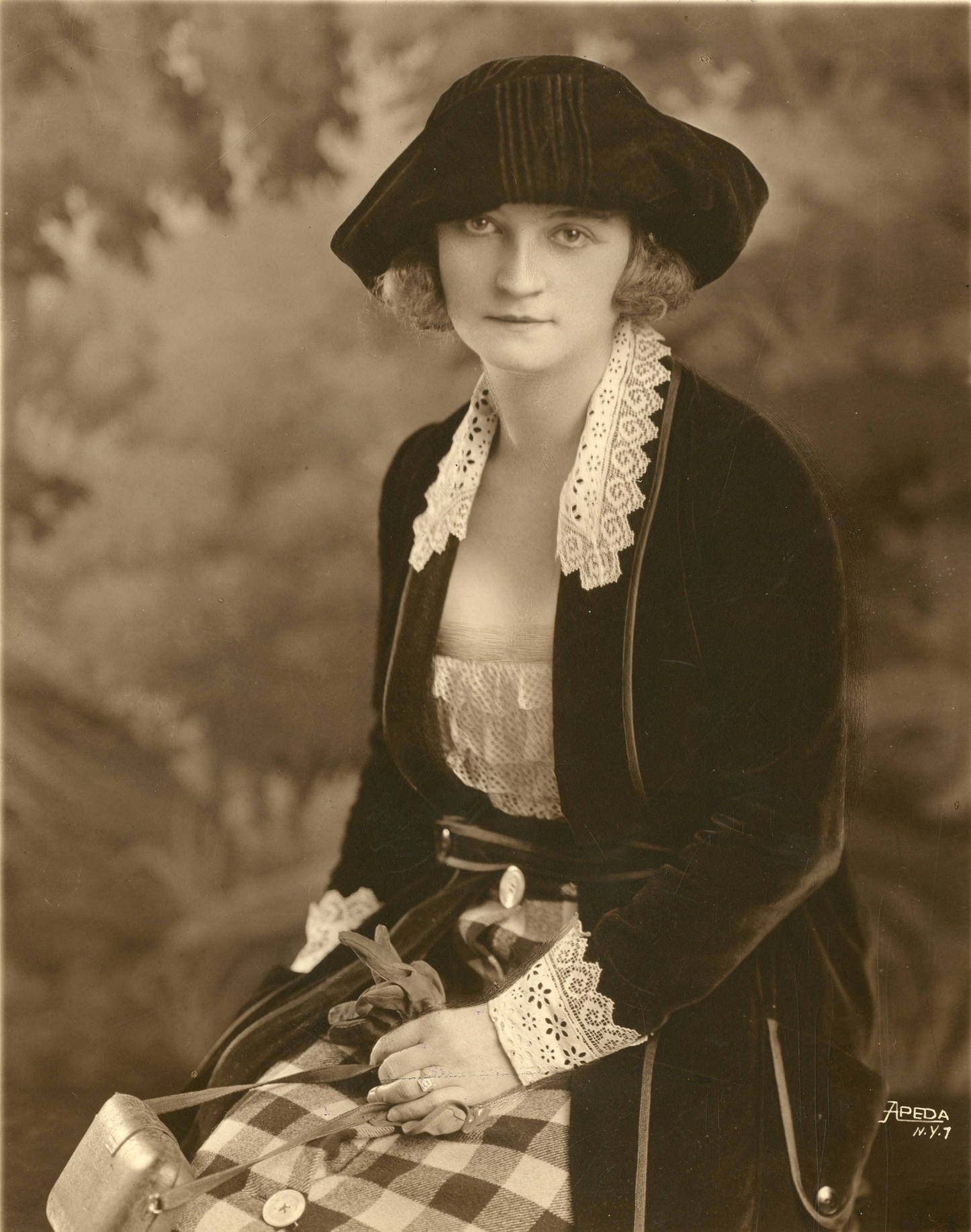
- Montrose in the early 1920s
- Born: Isabelle Donohue; April 23, 1886; Illinois, United States
- Died: October 26, 1964 (aged 78); Hollywood, California, United States
- Occupation: Actress
- Years active: 1920–1963
- Spouse: Carroll Abler
- Children: 1 (Steve Allen)

Belle Montrose (born Isabelle Donohue; April 23, 1886 – October 26, 1964) was an American actress and vaudeville performer.

== Career ==
The Illinois-born Montrose appeared on stage with her husband Carroll Abler (stage name: Billy Allen; 1888–1923) in the comedy team of Allen and Montrose (with Allen as the straight man), touring with the Orpheum vaudeville circuit.

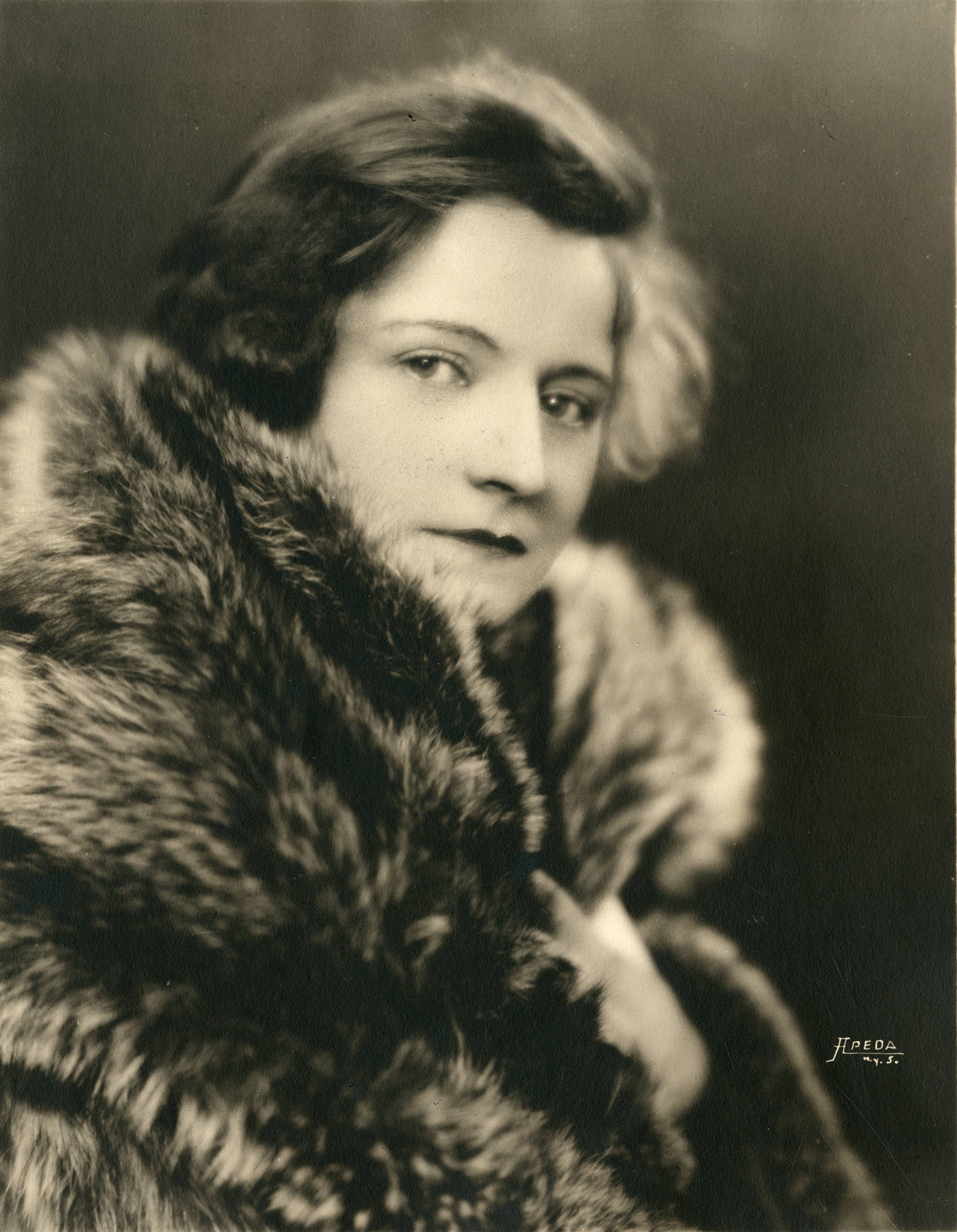
Belle Montrose, 1926

On December 26, 1921, Montrose and Carroll Abler became the parents of Steve Allen. After Carroll Abler died in 1923, young Steve Allen began living with the Montrose family on Chicago's South Side, near Hyde Park, while his mother toured. After Carroll's death, Belle continued in vaudeville, working as a solo act and with other comedians. In 1925, the 17-year-old comedian Milton Berle toured with Montrose. Years later, Steve Allen wrote about her in his memoir, Mark It and Strike It: An Autobiography (1960).

=== Television ===
Milton Berle once described Montrose as "the funniest woman in vaudeville." In her later years, Montrose acted on television, including several appearances on Steve Allen's Sunday show (1956–59), The Steve Allen Plymouth Show (1959–60), and later on The New Steve Allen Show (1961). She was a regular on The Hathaways (1961), starring Peggy Cass and Jack Weston.

=== Films ===
Montrose's movie credits include The Absent-Minded Professor (1961) and its sequel Son of Flubber (1963).

== Death ==
At the age of 78, Montrose died of a heart attack in Hollywood. She is buried in San Fernando Mission Cemetery in San Fernando, California.

== Filmography ==
Year	Title	Role	Notes
1961	The Absent-Minded Professor	Mrs. Chatsworth	
1963	Son of Flubber	Mother in Commercial	Uncredited, (final film role)

== Sources ==
- Allen, Steve. Mark It and Strike It: An Autobiography, 1960.
