= The Absent-Minded Professor =

1961 film by Robert Stevenson

- Theatrical release poster
- Directed by: Robert Stevenson
- Screenplay by: Bill Walsh
- Based on: "A Situation of Gravity" by Samuel W. Taylor
- Produced by: Walt Disney
- Starring: Fred MacMurray; Nancy Olson; Keenan Wynn; Tommy Kirk; Leon Ames; Elliott Reid; Edward Andrews; Wally Brown; Alan Carney; Forrest Lewis; James Westerfield; Ed Wynn
- Cinematography: Edward Colman
- Edited by: Cotton Warburton
- Music by: George Bruns
- Production company: Walt Disney Productions
- Distributed by: Buena Vista Distribution
- Release date: March 16, 1961
- Running time: 97 minutes
- Country: United States
- Language: English
- Box office: $25.3 million

The Absent-Minded Professor is a 1961 American science fiction comedy film directed by Robert Stevenson and produced by Walt Disney Productions. It is based on the 1943 short story "A Situation of Gravity" (May 22, 1943 Liberty) by Samuel W. Taylor. The title character was based in part on Hubert Alyea, a professor emeritus of chemistry at Princeton University, who was known as "Dr. Boom" for his explosive demonstrations. The film stars Fred MacMurray as Professor Ned Brainard, alongside Nancy Olson, Keenan Wynn, Tommy Kirk, Leon Ames, Elliott Reid, and Edward Andrews. The plot follows Brainard as he invents a substance that defies gravity, which he later exploits through various means.

Released on March 16, 1961, the film was a box office success, and two years later became the first Disney film to have a sequel, Son of Flubber (1963). It was one of the first Disney films to be colorized (for the 1986 VHS release), and, along with The Shaggy Dog (1959) and Son of Flubber, is one of Disney's few black-and-white films to be produced after 1941. A remake titled Flubber with Robin Williams was released in 1997.

== Plot ==
Professor Ned Brainard is an absent-minded professor of physical chemistry at Medfield College who invents a substance that gains energy when it strikes a hard surface. This discovery follows some blackboard scribbling in which he reverses a sign in the equation for enthalpy to energy plus pressure times volume. Ned names his discovery Flubber, a portmanteau of "flying rubber". In the excitement of his discovery, he misses his own wedding to Betsy Carlisle, not for the first time, but the third. Subplots include Shelby Ashton, another professor, wooing the disappointed Betsy; Biff Hawk, Medfield's best basketball player, who is ineligible to play in the game against archrival Rutland due to failing Professor Brainard's class; the schemes of Biff's father, businessman Alonzo P. Hawk, to gain wealth by means of Flubber; the school's financial difficulties and debt to Alonzo; and Ned's attempts to interest the government and military in uses for Flubber. Ned takes his revenge on Shelby by repeatedly jumping on the top of Shelby's car until it crashes into a police car, where a now-manic Shelby is given a field sobriety test.

Looking for backers, Ned bounces his Flubber ball for an audience, but his investment pitch proves so long-winded that most of the crowd has left before they notice that the ball bounced higher on its second bounce than on its first. For a more successful demonstration, he makes his Model T fly by bombarding Flubber with radioactive particles. After Medfield trails Rutland at the half by a large margin, Ned puts Flubber on the soles of the Medfield team's shoes, giving them tremendous jumping ability which causes them to make a furious comeback, winning by a buzzer beater; he also uses the substance on his own shoe soles to augment his skills during a school dance.

Alonzo becomes aware of Ned's flying car and, at Biff's suggestion, switches it for a fake Model T with squirrels and pigeons under the hood. Ned's debut turns into a mockery when he finds himself with Alonzo's fake car, and plays on Alonzo's greed by pointing out that, in the 1960s, only 8% of the world's population uses cars, but nearly everyone wears shoes. Ned gives Hawk a pair of Flubber shoes to cause Alonzo to bounce endlessly and become blackmailed into revealing where he hid the real car. Alonzo soon attracts everyone's attention, even a news crew, who interviews a physicist who remarks, "By 7 tonight, he's going to be in serious trouble!" The police escort the Medfield football team to tackle Alonzo on his way down, stopping his bounces.

Alonzo and Biff then chase after Ned, who by then has recovered his car from Alonzo's warehouse. Alonzo crashes into the same squad car Shelby did, and gets arrested for illegal firearms possession. Ned convinces Betsy to accompany him to Washington, D.C. Having never seen a flying car, the military considers it an attack and is ready to open fire until one junior officer recommends against it, as Ned is atop the United States Capitol building. Now able to convince the government of the merits of Flubber, Ned finally marries Betsy. The two fly away from a cheering crowd in Ned's Model T.

== Cast ==
- Fred MacMurray as Professor Ned Brainard
- Nancy Olson as Betsy Carlisle
- Keenan Wynn as Alonzo P. Hawk
- Tommy Kirk as Biff Hawk
- Leon Ames as President Jeffrey Daggett
- Elliott Reid as Professor Shelby Ashton
- Edward Andrews as Defense Secretary
- David Lewis as General Singer
- Jack Mullaney as Air Force Captain
- Belle Montrose as Mrs. Chatsworth
- Wally Brown as Coach Elkins
- Alan Carney as First Referee
- Wally Boag as TV Newsman
- Don Ross as Lenny
- Forrest Lewis as Officer Kelley
- James Westerfield as Officer Hanson
- Gage Clarke as Reverend Bosworth
- Alan Hewitt as General Hotchkiss
- Raymond Bailey as Admiral Olmstead
- Wendell Holmes as General Poynter
- Ed Wynn as Fire Chief
- Paul Frees as Alert Crew Controller Loud Speaker Voice (uncredited)

== Production ==
The aforementioned Prof. Hubert Alyea (1903–1996), professor of chemistry at Princeton University, earned the nickname "Dr. Boom" from Russian observers of his demonstrations at the International Science Pavilion of the 1958 Brussels World's Fair, which Walt Disney attended. Disney told Alyea that he had given him an idea for a film, and invited Alyea to California to give a demonstration for actor Fred MacMurray, who later mimicked Alyea's mannerisms for the film. MacMurray would later state that he had never understood chemistry until his meeting with Alyea.

The special effects were created by Robert A. Mattey and Eustace Lycett, who were nominated for an Academy Award, and included the sodium screen matte process, as well as miniatures and wire-supported mockups. The film's "Medfield Fight Song" was written by Richard M. and Robert B. Sherman, their first song for a Disney feature.

Keenan Wynn and his father Ed Wynn appear together in this film. Keenan also played Alonzo Hawk in Son of Flubber (1963) and for a third time in Herbie Rides Again (1974). Keenan plays a similar character in the 1976 sequel to The Shaggy Dog (starring McMurray), The Shaggy D.A. centered in the town of Medfield. Keenan's son Ned also appears uncredited in a bit part. Ed Wynn also appeared in Son of Flubber. At this stage of his life, Ed Wynn's memory was fading and he couldn't remember his lines, but he retained his innate wit and invention, so he improvised much of his dialogue, while director Stephenson instructed his crew to "just let him go on and on. You see, he had the most wonderful imagination".

Medfield College of Technology was used again as the setting for the sequel, Son of Flubber, as well as a later trilogy of films based around the character Dexter Riley — The Computer Wore Tennis Shoes (1969), Now You See Him, Now You Don't (1972), and The Strongest Man in the World (1975), each starring Kurt Russell and Cesar Romero.

== Awards ==
At the 34th Academy Awards on April 9, 1962, The Absent-Minded Professor had nominations for three Academy Awards.

- Art Direction (Black and White) (Carroll Clark, Emile Kuri, Hal Gausman).
- Cinematography (Black and White) (Edward Colman)
- Special Effects (Robert A. Mattey, Eustace Lycett)

== Releases ==
The film was reissued to theaters in 1967 and 1975, and released to video in 1981, 1986, and 1993. It was released as a pan and scan print on VHS in black and white in 1981 and 1993, and in a colorized version in 1986 and 1997 (to commemorate the release of the new remake Flubber). In 2003, the film was released to DVD in widescreen. In 2008, the film was re-packaged as a two-disc set with its sequel, Son of Flubber. The film was released on a Disney Movie Club Exclusive 55th Anniversary Blu-Ray on March 1, 2016.

== Reception ==
Bosley Crowther of The New York Times called it "remarkably bouncy entertainment ... the grown-ups should find it entertaining for the silly shenanigans it contains and for the simple satisfaction of noting the pleasure it gives the kids". Variety described it as "a comedy-fantasy of infectious absurdity" with MacMurray "ideally cast". Philip K. Scheuer of the Los Angeles Times wrote that the film, "for all that it happens to be a one-joke picture, is good and funny ... while its satire should be at least as sharp as its slapstick, but isn't, the novelty of the gimmick will carry the picture to popularity". Edith Oliver of The New Yorker called it "a funny and unpretentious piece of slapstick that cannot fail to please children and all the rest of us who are fans of the Keystone Cops". The Monthly Film Bulletin called it "agreeable and entertaining", but "the comedy doesn't bounce enough. It is really a one-joke story, and could have done with more invention, more unpredictability; the humorous possibilities of the admirable flubber are not explored sufficiently".

Despite the number of positive reviews, some critics disparaged the film on its release, causing considerable pain to Walt Disney, who couldn't understand why anyone would dislike such a light-hearted picture, leading composer Richard Sherman to comment: "Don't let anybody ever tell you Walt was immune to a bad review. It bothered him! The good reviews never went to his head, but the bad reviews went to his heart".

In an interview, Taxi Driver writer Paul Schrader commented that this was the first film he had ever seen. In his own words, he was "very unimpressed" by it.

The film holds a rating of 83% on Rotten Tomatoes based on 23 reviews, with an average rating of 7.3 out of 10.

== 1943 short story version ==
The short story is told by William Crawford as a letter to FDR in the White House in 1943 wartime America. He tells him that the "transportation problem" has been solved. Gasoline and rubber are obsolete because of Professor Rhoades' new invention. Rhoades is an absent-minded professor who ties strings to his fingers so he will remember. He had earlier invented artificial rubber.

Ed Barnes, the garbage collector of Prairie Center, comes into Crawford's office during a scrap drive to tell him that Rhoades had taken out the engine of his Model T with the apparent intention to donate it. But then they both see Rhoades drive up outside his office in the Model T. Ed is puzzled because he believes it has no engine. The professor is silent. He takes them for a ride in the car. They drive to the bank and to the grocery store. On the way, they find themselves in the path of two trucks about to collide with them. The car escapes by flying up over the road.

Rhoades explains that the car is able to fly because of his new invention, an electrical device that taps into the electricity of power lines.

They then drive to his laboratory. They encounter Kurt Miller, an officer of the power company. Rhoades tells him that the new invention will enable dentures to stay in people's mouths. Miller wants the blueprints. Rhoades refuses. Miller then pulls out a gun. He is apparently a German spy working for the Nazis. He orders them to fly the car to the state capital, which they are forced to do.

Spotted as an unidentified aircraft, a twin-tailed Lockheed P-38 Lightning fighter is scrambled to go after them. Wing approached fender. The perplexed pilot ordered them to take the car down. Miller told them to refuse. He then shot at the plane. The plane shot tracers at the car.

The car suddenly went into a free fall as the professor worked with the control box in the back seat. They escaped from the P-38, landing safely in a field. Miller was choking in the back seat and was subdued and taken to the police.

Crawford concludes the letter by emphasizing to the President the benefits the "dingus" contraption that enables the car to fly will have for transportation, cars, trucks, and ever airplanes. He makes a request for funds to allow the professor to build another Model T model and that Congress repeal a law of gravity.

== Comic book adaptation ==
- Dell Four Color #1199 (April 1961)
- Gold Key Comics Shaggy Dog/The Absent-Minded Professor Double Feature #1 (August 1967)

== Legacy ==
=== Sequels ===
MacMurray, Olson, Reid, and Kirk reprised their roles in Son of Flubber, a sequel released less than two years later in 1963. Hewitt also returns (now as District Attorney), as well as the two Wynns (Keenan reprising his Alonzo P. Hawk role).

Wynn appeared in Herbie Rides Again (1974), the second film in Disney's Love Bug franchise, playing Alonzo A. Hawk rather than Alonzo P. Hawk. As the name is slightly changed, it is unclear whether the two series are meant to share a precise universe, but the Alonzo Hawk character is still a comic villain with the same modus operandi.

In 1988, the Disney Channel produced a film with the same name, which was not a remake, but a legacy sequel. The film takes place again at Medfield College, where Professor Brainard is now deceased and his work has been lost to the ages. Brainard's successor as the chemistry teacher is Professor Henry Crawford, played by Harry Anderson, and his girlfriend is Ellen Whitney, played by Mary Page Keller, who is the English teacher. Professor Crawford has much of the same absent-minded attitude as Brainard, although he invented a computer program named "Albert", an avatar of Albert Einstein, to help him stay on top of his responsibilities and remember appointments. Through happenstance, Crawford rediscovers the formula for Flubber. Albert warns that Flubber will react to dihydrogen monoxide, then accesses Brainard's files and recommends Henry recreate the famous flying Model T. One scene that was a tribute to the original film was Henry's use of the flying car to fly atop the car of a rival suitor for Ellen, then bumping his roof.

In 1989, The Absent-Minded Professor: Trading Places was made, where Henry has now married Ellen and was offered a job by his college friend (played by Ed Begley Jr.) at a defense firm. Henry realizes a sinister purpose and must work with his friend to thwart it. It is also shown that Henry did further experiments on Flubber and found that should it be baked in a kiln for 24 hours, it would solidify and become impervious to liquids, and christens this upgrade "Flass" (flying glass).

=== Remake ===
The Absent-Minded Professor has been remade as a 1997 theatrical film titled Flubber, with Robin Williams as the renamed Prof. Philip Brainard, with Marcia Gay Harden as his love interest, Dr. Sara Jean Reynolds (Nancy Olson appears in a cameo). Though neither the Anderson film nor the 1997 remake were as highly regarded as the original, the Robin Williams version was still a considerable success. Both remakes were made in color.

=== Chemistry ===
Several rubbery chemical compounds are named Flubber in honor of The Absent-Minded Professor's substance.

== See also ==
- List of basketball films
- Super Ball, the bouncy toy-ball invented in 1964 that is made from a synthetic rubber
