= Robert A. Mattey =

American special effects artist (1910–1993)

- Born: June 27, 1910; New Jersey, U.S.
- Died: January 14, 1993 (aged 82); Los Angeles, California, U.S.
- Other names: Rob Mattey; Robert Mattey; Bob Mattey
- Occupation: Visual effects artist
- Years active: 1946-1993

Robert A. Mattey (June 27, 1910 – January 14, 1993) was an American special effects artist who was nominated at the 34th Academy Awards for the film The Absent-Minded Professor. His nomination was shared with Eustace Lycett. He joined Walt Disney Imagineering when Disneyland was first being created as head of the Mechanical Effects Department.

Mattey is most famously known for his creation of the three animatronic sharks used in the production of Jaws (1975), with a production cost of around $150,000 each. The mechanical shark was nicknamed "Bruce" because Steven Spielberg's lawyer's name was Bruce Ramer. This is also what inspired the name for the great white shark, Bruce, in Finding Nemo (2003).

He was also one of the designers of the Disneyland animatronic characters on attractions like Jungle Cruise, Mine Train Through Nature's Wonderland, the Haunted Mansion, and the 20,000 Leagues Under the Sea walk-through attraction. When Disneyland opened in 1955, Robert Mattey was given a dedication window on Main Street U.S.A. located on the second floor of the Market House. The window states "Bob Mattey - Taxidermist."

== Selected filmography ==
- 20,000 Leagues Under the Sea (1954)
- The Absent-Minded Professor (1961)
- Babes in Toyland (1961)
- Son of Flubber (1963)
- Mary Poppins (1964)
- The Monkey's Uncle (1965)
- Lt. Robin Crusoe, U.S.N. (1966)
- The Gnome-Mobile (1967)
- Blackbeard's Ghost (1968)
- The Love Bug (1968)
- The Barefoot Executive (1971)
- Scandalous John (1971)
- Jaws (1975)
- Jaws 2 (1978)
