= Son of Flubber =

1963 film by Robert Stevenson

- Theatrical release poster
- Directed by: Robert Stevenson
- Screenplay by: Bill Walsh; Don DaGradi
- Based on: Story by Samuel W. Taylor
- Produced by: Walt Disney
- Starring: Fred MacMurray; Nancy Olson; Keenan Wynn; Tommy Kirk; Joanna Moore; Leon Ames; Elliott Reid; Edward Andrews; Ed Wynn; Charlie Ruggles; Ken Murray; William Demarest; Paul Lynde; Bob Sweeney
- Cinematography: Edward Colman
- Edited by: Cotton Warburton
- Music by: George Bruns
- Production company: Walt Disney Productions
- Distributed by: Buena Vista Distribution
- Release date: January 16, 1963
- Running time: 103 minutes
- Country: United States
- Language: English
- Budget: $2 million
- Box office: $22.1 million

Son of Flubber is a 1963 American science fiction comedy film directed by Robert Stevenson and produced by Walt Disney Productions. It is the sequel to The Absent-Minded Professor (1961) and the first sequel to a Disney film. Fred MacMurray reprises his role from the previous film as Ned Brainard, a scientist who has perfected a high-bouncing substance, Flubber ("flying rubber"), that can levitate an automobile and cause athletes to bounce into the sky. In addition to MacMurray, Nancy Olson, Keenan Wynn, Ed Wynn, Elliott Reid, and Tommy Kirk also co-star, reprising their roles from the previous film.

Released on January 16, 1963, the film was shot in black and white (the final Disney live-action film to be made in black and white), but a colorized version was released on VHS in 1997.

== Plot ==
Professor Ned Brainard's discovery of Flubber has not quite brought him or his college the riches he thought.

The Pentagon has declared his discovery "top secret" and the IRS has slapped him with a huge tax bill, even though he has yet to receive any money from his invention. Ned thinks he may have found the solution in the form of "Flubbergas", or the "son of Flubber", which can actually change the weather.

Brainard's experiments with the ray projector make it rain in his kitchen and in his garage, but it has one unfortunate side effect: Flubbergas only works on makeshift clouds, but when it comes to real clouds, there is no rain at all, instead, it shatters the glass all over town. This places Brainard on the lam from Alonzo P. Hawk, who is planning to close Medfield College, and whose insurance company must pay the claims for the broken glass. Mr. Hawk traces the damage to Ned, and threatens legal action after Ned rejects his offer to become partners in a glass company scam.

Meanwhile, at home, Ned's wife Betsy is fed up with the stress of their financial situation and jealous of the attentions lavished on him by an old high school girlfriend Shelby brings around while Shelby starts trying to woo her again. When Brainard feels threatened by Professor Shelby's attentions towards his wife, Brainard uses it to make it rain inside Shelby's car, complete with thunder and lightning, to frighten the man, causing his car to flood with water and completely underwater inside, and to crash right into the same police car that he wrecked in the Absent-Minded Professor.

After Flubbergas is used to help Medfield win a football game over their rival Rutland, Betsy dumps Shelby when Ned is arrested over the glass breaking.

On trial, Ned's future seems hopeless as he is faced with the various property damage lawsuit. A prosecutor urges Ned to return to his classroom and give up his science experiments. However, the county agricultural extension agent shows the court that crops all around the town have experienced accelerated growth because of Ned's experiments, because of what the agent names "Dry Rain".

The professor is acquitted and he and Betsy are reunited.

Driving home in their flying car, Betsy tells Ned she is now crazy about his science experiments, and soon they share a kiss. In the last scene, the football filled with Flubbergas flies into outer space.

== Cast ==
- Fred MacMurray as Professor Ned Brainard
- Nancy Olson as Betsy Brainard, nee Carlisle
- Keenan Wynn as Alonzo P. Hawk
- Ed Wynn as A. J. Allen
- Bob Sweeney as Mr. Harker
- Paul Lynde as the Sportscaster
- Tommy Kirk as Biff Hawk
- Leon Ames as President Rufus Daggett
- Charlie Ruggles as Judge Murdock
- Ken Murray as Mr. Hurley
- William Demarest as Mr. Hummel
- Elliott Reid as Prof. Shelby Ashton
- Joanna Moore as Desiree de la Roche
- Edward Andrews as Defense Secretary
- James Westerfield as Police Officer Hanson
- Alan Carney as Referee
- Forrest Lewis as Police Officer Kelly
- Alan Hewitt as Prosecutor
- Jack Albertson as Mr. Barley
- Stuart Erwin as Coach Wilson
- Eddie Ryder as Mr. Osborne
- Harriet MacGibbon as Mrs. Edna Daggett
- Beverly Wills as Mother in Commercial
- Wally Boag as George – Father in Commercial
- Ginny Tyler as Baby Walter (voice)
- Leon Tyler as Humphrey Hacker
- Joe Flynn as TV Announcer Rex Williams (uncredited)
- Clegg Hoyt as George (silent uncredited part with Paul Lynde)

This is a film in which Ed Wynn and his son Keenan Wynn appear together. They also each appeared in The Absent Minded Professor. Walt Disney's grandson Christopher Miller cameos as Baby Walter.

== Production ==
Plans to make a sequel to The Absent-Minded Professor were announced in November 1961. According to Walt Disney's daughter, her father (who abhorred sequels) made the film only because there were unused gags from The Absent-Minded Professor.

The scene where the Professor makes it rain into Shelby's car, causing the accident with a police car, is very similar to the scene in The Absent-Minded Professor, where the Professor repeatedly jumps on top of Shelby's car, causing an accident with the same police car.

The football game was filmed on a field constructed on the Disney studio soundstage, with players suspended by wires. This was necessary because of the special effects involved. The opposing team was made up of professional football players.

Medfield College, which was also the setting for the earlier film The Absent-Minded Professor, was later used for Disney's Dexter Riley trilogy: The Computer Wore Tennis Shoes (1969), Now You See Him, Now You Don't (1972), and The Strongest Man in the World (1975), with all three starring Kurt Russell and Cesar Romero.

Keenan Wynn would play a version of Alonzo Hawk once more, in Herbie Rides Again (1974), where his middle initial inexplicably changes from P to A.

== Reception ==
Son of Flubber was a critical and commercial success. It grossed $22,129,412 at the box office, earning $7.1 million in theatrical rentals, making it the 6th highest-grossing film of 1963. The film holds an 88% "Fresh" rating on the review aggregate website Rotten Tomatoes. It was less well-received critically than the original.

Bosley Crowther of The New York Times wrote: "It is crazy, of course, in the spirit of old-fashioned sight-gag slapstick farce, but it is fun—and, indeed, a bit of a satire on the weird inventions of the new atomic age." Variety opined that the film "doesn't fill its father's footprints" and "lacks the ingenuity, clarity and neatness of its memorable progenitor. Fortunately, though, individual scenes within the less effective whole have the same uproarious, bellylaugh quality that characterized the original." Philip K. Scheuer of the Los Angeles Times wrote: "Since I had no laugh-o-meter handy I was unable to clock the yocks but I am sure 'Son of Flubber' will hold its own against The Absent-Minded Professor and Bon Voyage." The Monthly Film Bulletin thought that the film "strains too hard to repeat the success of its predecessor, The Absent-Minded Professor, and is further weighed down by some unnecessary complications presented with little wit or sparkle. But the slapstick is generally as inventive as before, taking in a delightful spoof commercial for flubber and some excellent special effects when Professor Brainard launches his home-made clouds and his flubberised football player."

== Home Video ==
Son of Flubber was released on VHS in 1984. It was released on DVD on April 6, 2004. A DVD 2-film bundle pack including The Absent Minded Professor and Son of Flubber was released on September 16, 2008. It was released on a Disney Movie Exclusive Blu-Ray on August 16, 2016.

== See also ==
- The Absent-Minded Professor
- List of American films of 1963
- Flubber, a remake of the original film
