= Joyce Menges =

American actress

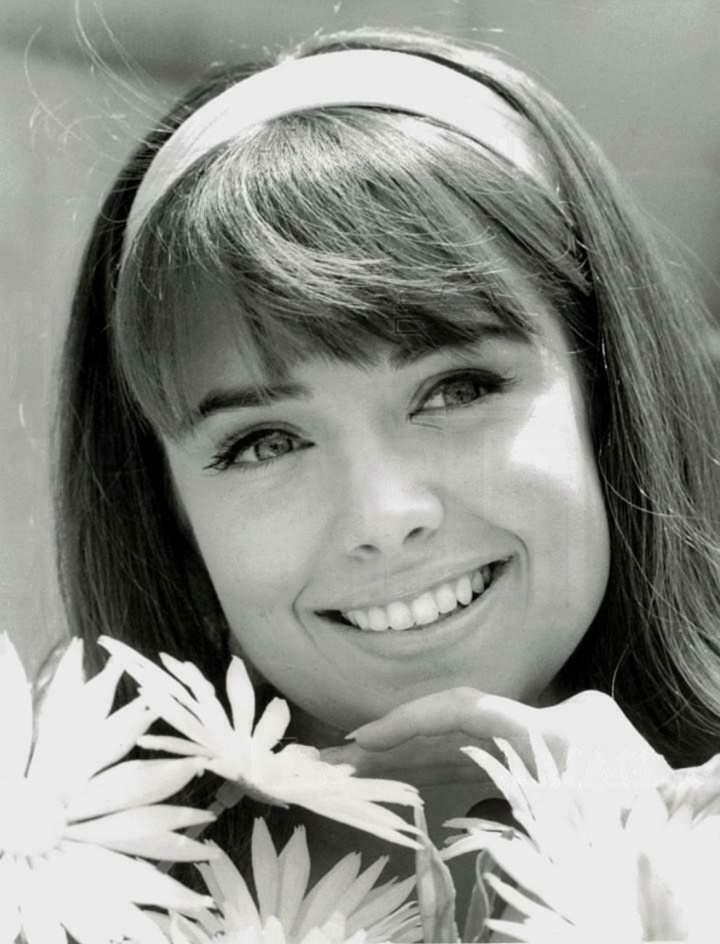
- Menges in To Rome With Love (1969)
- Born: Joyce Menges; August 6, 1948 (age 77); Sherman Oaks, California, United States of America
- Occupation: Actress
- Years active: 1967 - 1972

Joyce Menges is a retired American actress. She starred in Robert Butler's Now You See Him, Now You Don't as well as in the TV show To Rome With Love starring John Forsythe. Joyce's son is Jimmy Tamborello, the composer for the electronic indie pop band The Postal Service.

== Filmography ==
Year	Film	Role	Notes
1967	The Gnome-Mobile	Gnome Maiden	Uncredited
1967	Dream Girl of '67	Hostress	86 episodes
1969	The Dating Game	Herself	1 episode
1969–1971	To Rome With Love	Alison Endicott	48 episodes
1972	Now You See Him, Now You Don't	Debbie Dawson	(final film role)
