= The Computer Wore Tennis Shoes =

1969 American film directed by Robert Butler

- Theatrical release poster
- Directed by: Robert Butler
- Written by: Joseph L. McEveety
- Produced by: Bill Anderson
- Starring: Kurt Russell; Cesar Romero; Joe Flynn
- Cinematography: Frank Phillips
- Edited by: Cotton Warburton
- Music by: Robert F. Brunner
- Production company: Walt Disney Productions
- Distributed by: Buena Vista Distribution
- Release date: December 31, 1969
- Running time: 90 minutes
- Country: United States
- Language: English
- Box office: $5.5 million (US/ Canada rentals)

The Computer Wore Tennis Shoes is a 1969 American science fiction comedy film starring Kurt Russell, Cesar Romero, Joe Flynn and William Schallert. It was produced by Walt Disney Productions and distributed by Buena Vista Distribution Company.

It was one of several films made by Disney using the setting of Medfield College, first used in the 1961 Disney film The Absent-Minded Professor and its sequel Son of Flubber. The Computer Wore Tennis Shoes is the first film of the "Dexter Riley" series.

== Plot ==
Dexter Riley and his friends attend Medfield College, a small private college which cannot afford to buy a computer. The students persuade wealthy businessman A. J. Arno to donate a computer to the college. Arno is secretly the head of an illegal gambling ring which used the computer for its operations.

While installing a replacement computer part during a thunderstorm, Riley receives an electric shock and becomes a human computer. He now has superhuman mathematical talent, can speed read and remember the contents of an encyclopedia volume in a few minutes, and can speak a language fluently after reading one textbook. His new abilities make him a worldwide celebrity and Medfield's best chance to win a televised quiz tournament with a $100,000 prize. Riley single-handedly leads Medfield's team in victories against other colleges, to his teammates' growing resentment.

During the tournament, a trigger word ("applejack") causes him to unconsciously recite details of Arno's gambling ring on live television. Arno's henchmen kidnap Riley and plan to kill him, but his friends help him escape by posing as house painters to gain access, and sneaking him out in a large trunk. During the escape, he suffers a concussion which, during the tournament final against rival Springfield State, gradually reduces his mental abilities to normal and leaves him unable to answer the final question. By an incredible coincidence his teammate Schuyler is able to answer the final question and win the $100,000 prize. Arno and his henchmen are arrested when they attempt to escape the TV studio and crash head-on into a police car.

== Cast ==
- Kurt Russell as Dexter Riley
- Cesar Romero as A. J. Arno
- Joe Flynn as Dean Eugene Higgins
- William Schallert as Professor Quigley
- Alan Hewitt as Dean Collingsgood
- Richard Bakalyan as Chillie Walsh
- Debbie Paine as Annie Hannah
- Frank Webb as Pete
- Michael McGreevey as Richard Schuyler
- Jon Provost as Bradley
- Frank Welker as Henry Fathington
- Alexander Clarke as Myles Miller
- Bing Russell as Angelo
- Pat Harrington as Moderator
- Fabian Dean as Little Mac
- Fritz Feld as Sigmund van Dyke
- Pete Renoudet as Lt. Charlie Hannah
- Hillyard Anderson as J. Reedy
- Ed Begley Jr.* as J. Flanderka
- Gail Bonney* as Winnifrid
- David Canary* as Walski
- Howard Culver* as the Moderator
- William Fawcett* as Regent Dietes
- Robert Foulk* as Police desk sergeant
- Heather Menzies* as Priscilla's Lady in Waiting
- Byron Morrow* as Regent Leonard
- Gregory Morton* as Dr. Rufus Schmidt
- Olan Soule* as a TV Reporter

* Not credited on-screen.

== Music ==
The film's theme song, "The Computer Wore Tennis Shoes", was written by Robert F. Brunner and Bruce Belland.

== Reception ==
A. H. Weiler of The New York Times wrote: "This 'Computer' isn't I.B.M.'s kind but it's homey, lovable, as exciting as porridge and as antiseptic and predictable as any homey, half-hour TV family show". Gene Siskel of the Chicago Tribune reported: "I rather enjoyed The Computer Wore Tennis Shoes and I suspect children under 14 will like it, too". Arthur D. Murphy of Variety praised the film as "above-average family entertainment, enhanced in great measure by zesty, but never show-off, direction by Robert Butler, in a debut swing to pix from telefilm". Kevin Thomas of the Los Angeles Times wrote that "Disney Productions latched on to a terrific premise for some sharp satire only to flatten it out by jamming it into its familiar 'wholesome' formula. Alas, the movie itself comes out looking like it had been made by a computer".

The film holds a score of 50% on Rotten Tomatoes based on six reviews.

== Release ==
The Computer Wore Tennis Shoes was released by Walt Disney Home Video through VHS on October 19, 1985. It was later re-released by Walt Disney Studios Home Entertainment on Blu-ray disc on September 9, 2014 as a Disney Movie Club exclusive.

== Legacy ==
=== Sequels ===
- Now You See Him, Now You Don't (1972)
- The Strongest Man in the World (1975)

=== Television films ===
This film was remade as the television film The Computer Wore Tennis Shoes in 1995 starring Kirk Cameron as Dexter Riley.

Other Disney Channel films carrying similar plot elements were the Not Quite Human film series, which aired in the late 1980s and early 1990s. The films were based on the series of novels with the same name.

=== Other ===
The animated title sequence, by future Academy Award-winning British visual effects artist Alan Maley, reproduced the look of contemporary computer graphics using stop motion photography of paper cutouts. It has been cited as an early example of "computational kitsch".

The 2000 episode of The Simpsons, "The Computer Wore Menace Shoes", is a reference to the film but the episode isn't related to the film in any other way, according to M. Keith Booker in his book Drawn to Television: Prime-Time Animation from The Flintstones to Family Guy.

== See also ==
- Dexter Riley (film series)
- List of American films of 1969
