= Robert Butler (director) =

American television and film director (1927–2023)

- Born: November 16, 1927; Los Angeles, California, U.S.
- Died: November 3, 2023 (aged 95); Los Angeles, California, U.S.
- Occupation: Director
- Years active: 1959–2009

Robert Stanton Butler (November 16, 1927 – November 3, 2023) was an American film and Emmy Award-winning television director. He is best known for his work in television, where he directed the pilots for a number of series including Star Trek, Hogan's Heroes, Batman, Lois & Clark: The New Adventures of Superman and Hill Street Blues.

== Career ==
Butler graduated from University of California, Los Angeles (UCLA), where he majored in English. He was first in an army band, before his career as a stage manager and an assistant before launching his directing career with an episode of Hennesey (starring Jackie Cooper and including a young Ron Howard) and then went on to direct such shows as The Untouchables, Dr. Kildare, The Dick Van Dyke Show, Batman, The Fugitive and The Twilight Zone.

Butler shot pilots for many TV series including the original Star Trek, Shane, Hogan's Heroes, Batman, The Blue Knight, Hill Street Blues, Remington Steele (a show which he also co-created), Moonlighting, Sisters, and Lois & Clark: The New Adventures of Superman.

Butler also directed episodes for many other shows, including Bonanza, I Spy, Blue Light, The Invaders, Gunsmoke, The Outcasts, Mission: Impossible, Kung Fu, Hawaii Five-O, Columbo: Publish or Perish, Columbo: Double Shock and Midnight Caller.

Butler directed actor Kurt Russell in four Walt Disney movies, including Guns in the Heather, The Computer Wore Tennis Shoes and The Barefoot Executive.

Butler won two Emmy Awards for outstanding directing, the first in 1973 for The Blue Knight pilot and the second in 1981 for his Hill Street Blues premiere.

In 2014, Butler's work was the subject of a career retrospective at the UCLA Film and Television Archive.

Butler was honored by the Directors Guild of America (DGA) with a Lifetime Achievement Award for Distinguished Achievement in Television Direction in February 2015.

Butler died in Los Angeles on November 3, 2023, missing his 96th birthday by thirteen days. With his death, Ralph Senensky had become the last living director to direct an episode of Star Trek (1966) until his own death almost exactly 2 years later on November 1, 2025

== Filmography ==
=== Film ===
- Guns in the Heather (1969)
- The Computer Wore Tennis Shoes (1969)
- The Barefoot Executive (1971)
- Scandalous John (1971)
- Now You See Him, Now You Don't (1972)
- The Ultimate Thrill (1974)
- Black Bart (1975) (Also producer)
- Hot Lead and Cold Feet (1978)
- Night of the Juggler (1980)
- Underground Aces (1981)
- Up The Creek (1984)
- Turbulence (1997)
- Where Do the Balloons Go? (2009) (Short film)

=== Television ===
| Year | Title | Director | Producer | Notes |
|---|---|---|---|---|
| 1959–1960 | Hennesey | Yes | No | 3 Episodes |
| 1960 | Happy | Yes | No | 1 Episode |
| 1960 | The Many Loves of Dobie Gillis | Yes | No | 1 Episode |
| 1960–1961 | The DuPont Show with June Allyson | Yes | No | 5 Episodes |
| 1961 | Bonanza | Yes | No | 1 Episode |
| 1961 | The Dick Van Dyke Show | Yes | No | 2 Episodes |
| 1961 | The Dick Powell Theater | Yes | No | 1 Episode |
| 1961 | The Gertrude Berg Show | Yes | No | 2 Episodes |
| 1961 | Have Gun – Will Travel | Yes | No | 1 Episode |
| 1961 | Michael Shayne | Yes | No | 1 Episode |
| 1961 | Peter loves Mary | Yes | No | 2 Episodes |
| 1961–1962 | The Detectives | Yes | No | 5 Episodes |
| 1962 | Follow The Sun | Yes | No | 3 Episodes |
| 1962 | The Rifleman | Yes | No | 1 Episode |
| 1962–1963 | Dr. Kildare | Yes | No | 2 Episodes |
| 1962–1963 | Stoney Burke | Yes | No | 2 Episodes |
| 1962–1963 | The Untouchables | Yes | No | 7 Episodes |
| 1963 | Ben Casey | Yes | No | 3 Episodes |
| 1963 | The Greatest Show On Earth | Yes | No | 2 Episodes |
| 1963 | The Richard Boone Show | Yes | No | 1 Episode |
| 1963–1964 | The Lieutenant | Yes | No | 2 Episodes |
| 1963–1965 | The Defenders | Yes | No | 2 Episodes |
| 1964 | Arrest and Trial | Yes | No | 1 Episode |
| 1964 | The Twilight Zone | Yes | No | 2 Episodes |
| 1964–1966 | The Fugitive | Yes | No | 6 Episodes |
| 1965 | Mister Roberts | Yes | No | 5 Episodes |
| 1965 | Run For Your Life | Yes | No | 1 Episode |
| 1965 | The Virginian | Yes | No | 1 Episode |
| 1965–1966 | Hogan's Heroes | Yes | No | 5 Episodes |
| 1965–1975 | The Magical World Of Disney | Yes | No | 12 Episodes |
| 1966 | Blue Light | Yes | No | 1 Episode |
| 1966 | Shane | Yes | No | 1 Episode |
| 1966 | I Spy | Yes | No | 4 Episodes |
| 1966 | Batman | Yes | No | 6 Episodes |
| 1966 | Star Trek | Yes | No | 2 Episodes |
| 1967 | Bob Hope Presents the Chrysler Theatre | Yes | No | 1 Episode |
| 1967 | The Invaders | Yes | No | 3 Episodes |
| 1967 | Judd, for the Defense | Yes | No | 2 Episodes |
| 1967 | N.Y.P.D. | Yes | No | 2 Episodes |
| 1967–1972 | Gunsmoke | Yes | No | 3 Episodes |
| 1967–1981 | Insight | Yes | Yes | 4 Episodes |
| 1968 | Cimarron Strip | Yes | No | 2 Episodes |
| 1968 | Ironside | Yes | No | 1 Episode |
| 1969 | Mission: Impossible | Yes | No | 1 Episode |
| 1969 | The Outcasts | Yes | No | 1 Episode |
| 1969 | CBS Playhouse | Yes | No | 1 Episode |
| 1969–1970 | Lancer | Yes | No | 4 Episodes |
| 1970 | Then Came Bronson | Yes | No | 1 Episode |
| 1972 | Nichols | Yes | No | 1 Episode |
| 1972–1973 | The Waltons | Yes | No | 3 Episodes |
| 1973 | Doc Elliot | Yes | No | 1 Episode |
| 1973 | Hawaii Five-O | Yes | No | 1 Episode |
| 1973 | Kung Fu | Yes | No | 4 Episodes |
| 1973 | Roll Out | Yes | No | 1 Episode |
| 1973–1974 | Columbo | Yes | No | 2 Episodes |
| 1975 | The Blue Knight | Yes | No | 1 Episode |
| 1981 | Hill Street Blues | Yes | No | 6 Episodes |
| 1982–1987 | Remington Steele | Yes | Yes | Also creator and executive consultant |
| 1985 | Moonlighting | Yes | No | 1 Episode |
| 1985 | Our Family Honor | Yes | No | 1 Episode |
| 1987 | Out on a Limb | Yes | No | 2 Episodes |
| 1988–1991 | Midnight Caller | Yes | Executive | Also executive consultant |
| 1991–1996 | Sisters | Yes | No | Also executive consultant |
| 1993 | Sirens | Yes | No | 2 Episodes |
| 1993–1994 | Lois & Clark: The New Adventures of Superman | Yes | Executive | Also executive consultant |
| 1999 | St. Michael's Crossing | Yes | Executive | |
| 2001 | The Division | Yes | No | 1 Episode |

TV movies

| Year | Title | Director | Producer | Writer |
|---|---|---|---|---|
| 1971 | Death Takes a Holiday | Yes | No | No |
| 1973 | The Blue Knight | Yes | No | No |
| 1974 | McMasters of Sweetwater | Yes | No | No |
| 1975 | Strange New World | Yes | No | No |
| 1976 | Dark Victory | Yes | No | No |
| 1976 | James Dean | Yes | No | No |
| 1976 | Mayday at 40,000 Feet! | Yes | No | No |
| 1977 | In the Glitter Palace | Yes | No | No |
| 1978 | Lacy and the Mississippi Queen | Yes | No | No |
| 1978 | A Question of Guilt | Yes | No | No |
| 1984 | Concrete Beat | Yes | No | No |
| 1986 | Long Time Gone | Yes | No | No |
| 1987 | On the Edge | Yes | Yes | Yes |
| 1988 | Out of Time | Yes | Executive | No |
| 1991 | The Brotherhood | Yes | No | No |
| 1994 | White Mile | Yes | No | No |
| 1998 | Glory, Glory | Yes | Executive | No |

Associate director

- Climax! (1956–1958) (4 Episodes)
- Playhouse 90 (1958–1959) (3 Episodes)
