= Flubber (film) =

1997 film by Les Mayfield

- Theatrical release poster
- Directed by: Les Mayfield
- Screenplay by: John Hughes; Bill Walsh
- Based on: "A Situation of Gravity" by Samuel W. Taylor
- Produced by: John Hughes; Ricardo Mestres
- Starring: Robin Williams; Marcia Gay Harden; Christopher McDonald; Raymond J. Barry; Clancy Brown; Ted Levine
- Cinematography: Dean Cundey
- Edited by: Harvey Rosenstock; Michael A. Stevenson
- Music by: Danny Elfman
- Production companies: Walt Disney Pictures; Great Oaks Entertainment
- Distributed by: Buena Vista Pictures Distribution
- Release dates: November 16, 1997 (Pennsylvania); November 26, 1997 (United States)
- Running time: 93 minutes
- Country: United States
- Language: English
- Budget: $50-80 million
- Box office: $178 million

Flubber is a 1997 American science-fiction comedy film directed by Les Mayfield and written by John Hughes and Bill Walsh. A remake of The Absent-Minded Professor (1961), the film was produced by Walt Disney Pictures and stars Robin Williams, Marcia Gay Harden, Christopher McDonald, Ted Levine, Raymond J. Barry, Wil Wheaton and Clancy Brown, with Jodi Benson providing a voice. The film received unfavorable reviews from critics, who panned its slapstick humor, special effects, plot, script and comparisons to the original, though Williams’ performance received praise.

== Plot ==
Absentminded professor Philip Brainard is developing a new energy source, hoping to save Medfield College from closure. His preoccupation with his research has caused him to miss two wedding dates, much to the ire of his fiancée, college president Sara Jean Reynolds. On their third attempted wedding day, Brainard is approached by his former partner Wilson Croft of rival Rutland College, who has profited from stealing his ideas and now intends to steal Sara.

While preparing for the wedding, Brainard has a breakthrough with the help of his robot assistant Weebo, who is secretly in love with him. Their experiment results in a sentient green goo with enormous elasticity and kinetic energy, which wreaks havoc on the neighborhood before the professor recaptures it. Weebo classifies the substance as "flying rubber", leading Brainard to christen it "Flubber". Working on Flubber into the following morning, Brainard realizes too late that he has again missed his own wedding. He unsuccessfully attempts to explain his absence to a heartbroken Sara, leaving Brainard determined to prove Flubber's worth and win her back.

Medfield College's wealthy sponsor Chester Hoenicker, who is threatening to close the school, sends his henchmen Smith and Wesson to persuade Brainard to give Hoenicker's entitled son Bennett a better grade. Brainard, too busy experimenting with Flubber, unknowingly subdues the goons with a Flubber-coated golf ball and bowling ball. Brainard also uses Flubber to enable his vintage Ford Thunderbird to fly, and overhears Wilson make a flirtatious bet with Sara about Medfield's upcoming basketball game against Rutland.

Struggling to confess her feelings for the professor, Weebo creates a holographic human version of herself and tries to kiss a sleeping Brainard, but he awakens with another idea for Flubber. Sneaking into the vacant basketball arena, he tests the effects of Flubber on a basketball and his shoes, allowing him to bounce incredibly far. At the game, he secretly applies Flubber to the abysmally unskilled Medfield team, enabling them to beat Rutland, but his attempt to win back Sara fails. Meanwhile, a mischievous Weebo releases Flubber to dance around the house.

Returning home, Brainard talks to Weebo, declaring that his absentmindedness is due to his love for Sara. Weebo, putting the professor's happiness before her own, shows Sara footage of Brainard's declaration, and the couple reconciles. Brainard demonstrates Flubber's abilities to Sara, but Hoenicker has discovered Flubber's profitable potential, offering to buy it and forgive the college's debt. Brainard and Sara refuse, making a deal with the Ford Motor Company instead and saving the college. Hoenicker sends Smith and Wesson to raid Brainard's house, where Weebo attempts to fend them off but is destroyed as they steal Flubber.

Mourning the loss of his beloved robot, Brainard discovers a farewell video from Weebo along with a backup of herself, her "daughter" Weebette. Brainard and Sara confront Hoenicker under the guise of selling him additional Flubber, and discover he is in league with Wilson. Unleashing Flubber, Brainard and Sara defeat Wilson, the Hoenickers, and their henchmen. Sometime later, Brainard saves Medfield from closing with Flubber and the happy couple finally have a successful wedding and embark on their honeymoon to Hawaii in the flying Ford Thunderbird with Weebette and Flubber.

== Cast ==
- Robin Williams as Professor Philip Brainard
- Marcia Gay Harden as Dr. Sara Jean Reynolds, Philip's fiancée
- Christopher McDonald as Wilson Croft, Philip's former partner
- Raymond J. Barry as Chester Hoenicker, Medfield College sponsor and Wilson's boss
- Clancy Brown as Smith, Hoenicker's henchman
- Ted Levine as Wesson, Hoenicker's henchman
- Wil Wheaton as Bennett Hoenicker, Chester's son
- Scott Michael Campbell as Dale Jepner
- Edie McClurg as Martha George
- Sam Lloyd as Coach Willy Barker, The Medfield College basketball head coach
- Bob Sarlatte as Rutland coach
- Dakin Matthews as the Minister
- Jane Sanguinetti as Female Life Model (uncredited)

=== Voice cast ===
- Jodi Benson as Weebo
  - Leslie Stefanson as Weebo's holographic human form, Sylvia
- Julie Morrison as Weebette, Weebo's daughter
- Scott Martin Gershin as Flubber

Additionally, Nancy Olson makes an uncredited appearance as a Ford Company Secretary. Olson previously portrayed Betsy Carlisle in The Absent-Minded Professor and its sequel, Son of Flubber.

== Production ==
=== Filming ===
Filming began in 1996 in San Francisco on Treasure Island in Building 180 and Hangar 3. Sets constructed there included the basketball court, a duplicate of the Professor's house, where some exterior and all interior shots were produced, a separate set portraying the basement of the house, and Hoenicker's library. Many exterior shots of Brainard's house were shot in San Jose at a home that was temporarily modified, including the addition of an observatory on the roof.

Sara Jean's office, Hoenicker's living room, and most exterior campus shots were produced at a private girls' high school on the San Francisco peninsula. The exterior shot of the Rutland gym was shot at Stanford. Some scenes were filmed on campus at San Jose State University in Washington Square Hall during production in 1997. The shot of the Professor and Sara Jean floating through the clouds in the Thunderbird was filmed at the former Mare Island Naval facility in Vallejo, California. Other scenes were filmed at the University of the Pacific, Stockton.

=== Gag homages ===
Many gags are embellishments from the 1961 film; John Hughes rewrote the original Bill Walsh screenplay (based on Samuel W. Taylor's short story A Situation of Gravity, originally published in the May 22, 1943, issue of Liberty magazine). Although Walsh died in 1975, he received posthumous credit for this script.

== Release ==
=== Home media ===
Flubber was released on VHS and Laserdisc on April 21, 1998. The DVD was released on June 16 of the same year, with the film's original theatrical trailer as a bonus feature.

== Reception ==
=== Box office ===
Flubber grossed $93 million in the United States and Canada, and $85 million in other territories, for a worldwide total of $178 million.

The film opened alongside Alien Resurrection, and was projected to gross around $32.5 million in its five-day Thanksgiving opening weekend. It went on to debut to $26.7 million (and a total of $36.4 million over the five), topping the box office. It fell 58% to $11.3 million in its second weekend, remaining in first.

=== Critical response ===
On Rotten Tomatoes, Flubber holds an approval rating of 24% based on 38 reviews, with an average rating of 4/10. The website's critical consensus reads: "With its overactive focus on special effects and tiresome slapstick, Flubber squanders the immense talent of its cast and crew." Metacritic assigned the film a weighted average score of 37 out of 100, based on 19 critics, indicating "generally unfavorable" reviews. Audiences polled by CinemaScore gave the film an average grade of "B+" on a scale of A+ to F.
