= Joe Flynn (American actor) =

American actor (1924–1974)

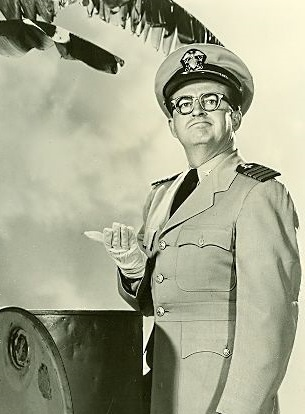
- Flynn as Capt. Binghamton on McHale's Navy in 1963
- Born: Joseph Anthony Flynn III; November 8, 1924; Youngstown, Ohio, U.S.
- Died: July 19, 1974 (aged 49); Los Angeles, California, U.S.
- Burial place: Holy Cross Cemetery in Culver City, California
- Education: Northwestern University; University of Southern California
- Occupation: Actor
- Years active: 1948–1974
- Spouse: Shirley Haskin (m. 1955)
- Children: 2
- Relatives: Byron Haskin (father-in-law)

Joseph Anthony Flynn III (November 8, 1924 – July 19, 1974) was an American actor. He was known for playing Captain Wallace Binghamton in the 1960s ABC television situation comedy McHale's Navy. Flynn was also a frequent guest star on 1960s TV shows, such as Batman, and appeared in several Walt Disney film comedies.

== Early years ==
Flynn was born in Youngstown, Ohio, to a physician. He graduated from The Rayen School in Youngstown and attended Northwestern University. During World War II, he served in the Army Special Services Branch entertaining the troops before moving west in 1946 to pursue acting and complete his education. He majored in political science at the University of Southern California.

== Early career ==
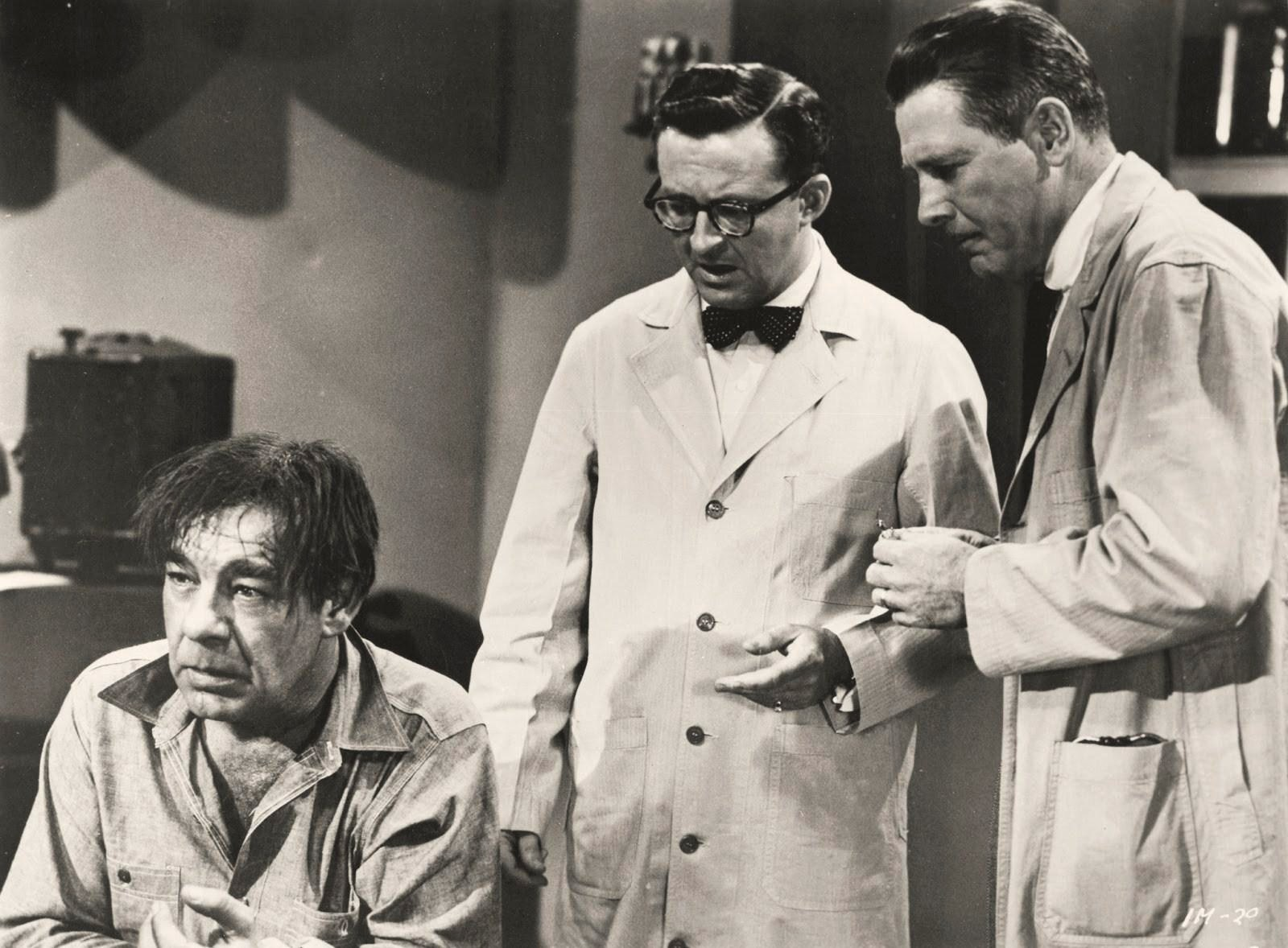
Lon Chaney Jr., Joe Flynn and Robert Shayne in Indestructible Man (1956)

Flynn had an interest in theater before leaving northeastern Ohio. He established himself early as a ventriloquist and radio disc jockey. Flynn gained local celebrity as a director by guiding the Canfield Players in such productions as Harvey, Antigone and Pursuit of Happiness.

He broke into television in pre-network days in Los Angeles. In 1948, he starred in his own local situation comedy, Yer Old Buddy, produced and broadcast by pioneering television station KTLA.

After appearing in a number of stage plays, Flynn returned to Youngstown, where in 1950 he conducted an unsuccessful campaign for a seat in the Ohio Senate as a Republican.

Following his electoral defeat, Flynn pursued his acting career and appeared in nearly 30 films, including many Disney films. He later recalled watching an audience's reaction to his performance in the 1956 horror film Indestructible Man starring Lon Chaney Jr. Although he played a serious part in the picture, people laughed, which convinced him that comedy was his forte.

Flynn played a robber and cop murderer in a 1956 episode of Highway Patrol, but was hard to recognize without the black glasses.

Flynn starred in several episodes of the syndicated 1957–1958 series The Silent Service, a show dedicated to the Navy's submarine service during World War II. He played Mr. Kelley in 15 episodes of The Adventures of Ozzie and Harriet and appeared in other classic series such as The George Burns and Gracie Allen Show, The Twilight Zone, Gunsmoke (S4E27 as Onie Becker & S8E10 as "Liquor Drummer") and Make Room for Daddy. He was a regular on William Bendix's The Life of Riley. He appeared at least twice on NBC's The Ford Show, Starring Tennessee Ernie Ford. His appearance on March 30, 1961, was a patriotic program set at sea on the aircraft carrier USS Yorktown, to celebrate the 50th anniversary of naval aviation. He guest starred on Walter Brennan's ABC sitcom The Real McCoys, Tab Hunter′s NBC sitcom The Tab Hunter Show and on the syndicated western Pony Express. In 1961, Flynn appeared in season 1 of The Joey Bishop Show.

== McHale's Navy ==
From 1962 to 1966, Flynn played the irascible Captain Wallace "Wally" Burton Binghamton (also known as "Old Leadbottom") on ABC's McHale's Navy in all but one episode, in which he became known for his exasperated catch phrases "What is it, What, WHAT, WHAT!?", "What in the name of the Blue Pacific/Halsey/Nimitz" and "I could just scream!" He also starred in two 1964 theatrical films spun off from the series, McHale's Navy and McHale's Navy Joins the Air Force.

In the spring of 1970, Flynn co-starred with Tim Conway, with whom he had worked in McHale's Navy and the two McHale's Navy films, in the situation comedy The Tim Conway Show as the inept operators of the single-plane charter airline Triple A Airlines. The unsuccessful show ran for only 12 episodes.

Flynn's career in feature films included the 1963 comedy Son of Flubber, in which he had a small part as a television announcer. Flynn later starred as Medfield College's Dean Higgins in a trio of Disney Studio films, The Computer Wore Tennis Shoes (1969), Now You See Him, Now You Don't (1972) and The Strongest Man in the World (1975), his final live-action film. Flynn also appeared in Did You Hear the One About the Traveling Saleslady? (1968), The Love Bug (1968), My Dog, the Thief (1969), The Wacky Zoo of Morgan City (1970), The Barefoot Executive (1971), The Million Dollar Duck (1971), How to Frame a Figg (1971) starring Don Knotts, Superdad (1973) starring Bob Crane and The Girl Most Likely To... (1973), a made-for-television dark comedy written by Joan Rivers.

== Personal life ==
In 1955, Flynn married Shirley Haskin, the daughter of director Byron Haskin. They had two children.

== Later career and death ==
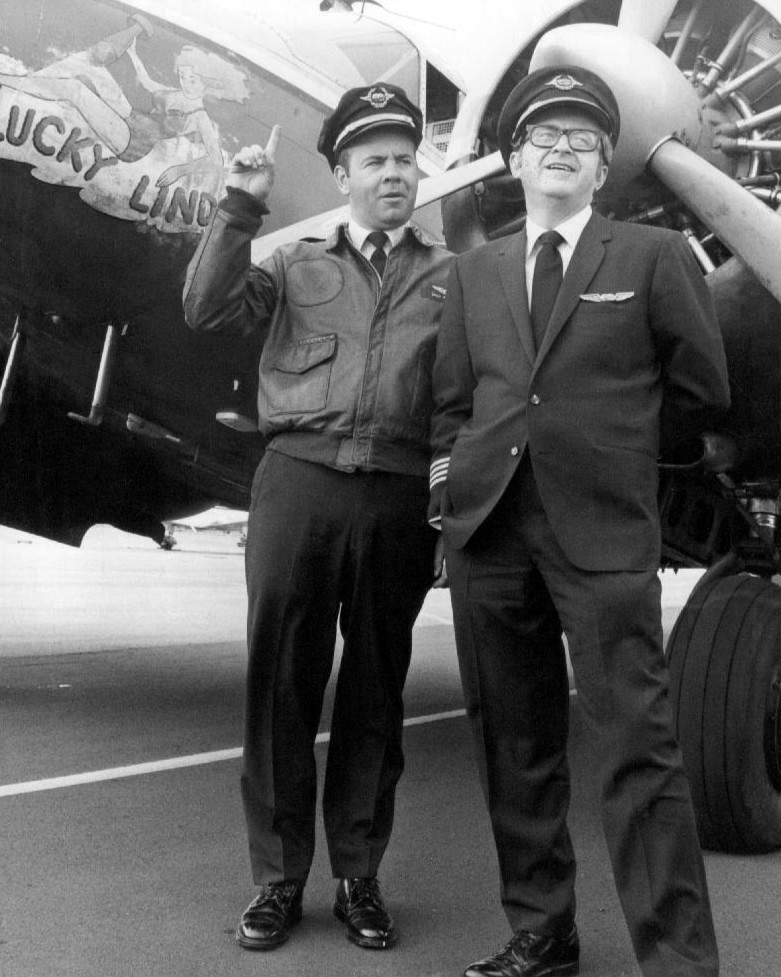
Flynn co-starred with Tim Conway in The Tim Conway Show in 1970. Flynn played the role of the boss of a small airline and Conway played its pilot.

Throughout his life, Flynn maintained a strong connection to his home town. From 1969 to 1974, he was involved in northeastern Ohio's Kenley Players. He often returned to Youngstown to visit family residing on Elm Street on the city's north side. In recognition of his contributions to the broadcasting field, Flynn became the ninth recipient of the Ohio Association of Broadcasters Award.

In the early 1970s, Flynn spearheaded a movement on behalf of the Screen Actors Guild for more equitable distribution of TV residual payments.

He made a dozen appearances on The Tonight Show Starring Johnny Carson in 1972 and 1973. He hosted a revised edition of It Pays to Be Ignorant and was a guest panelist on the game show series Match Game '74 on January 17, 1974 (recorded on January 5, 1974), his final game show appearance.

On July 19, 1974, shortly after Flynn completed voice-over work as Mr. Snoops for Walt Disney's animated feature film The Rescuers (his final film released in June 1977), his body was discovered by family members in the swimming pool of his Beverly Hills home. He apparently had a heart attack while swimming. Flynn is interred in Culver City's Holy Cross Cemetery. His June 13, 1974, taping of The Merv Griffin Show had been announced for broadcast on July 19, prior to Flynn's death the same day, proving to be his final appearance.

== Selected filmography ==
- The Babe Ruth Story (1948) — Extra (uncredited)
- The Big Chase (1954) — Milton Graves , Reporter
- The Seven Little Foys (1955) — Priest (uncredited)
- The Desperate Hours (1955) — Motorist Hijacked by Hal (uncredited)
- Trial (1955) — Speakers Bureau (uncredited)
- Highway Patrol (1956) (Season 1 Episode 36: "Taxi") — robber Steve Stanky
- The Steel Jungle (1956) — Marlin's Henchman (uncredited)
- Indestructible Man (1956) — Bradshaw's Assistant (uncredited)
- The Boss (1956) — Ernie Jackson
- Portland Exposé (1957) — Ted Carl (uncredited)
- Panama Sal (1957) — Barrington C. Ashbrook
- This Happy Feeling (1958) — Dr. McCafferty
- Go, Johnny, Go! (1959) — Head Usher (uncredited)
- -30- (1959) — Hymie Shapiro
- The Twilight Zone (1959) (Season 1 Episode 6: "Escape Clause") - Steve, Insurance Man #2
- Alfred Hitchcock Presents (1961) (Season 6 Episode 37: "Make My Death Bed") - Ken Taylor
- Cry for Happy (1961) — John McIntosh
- The Last Time I Saw Archie (1961) — Private Russell Drexler
- Lover Come Back (1961) — Hadley
- Son of Flubber (1963) — Rex Williams (uncredited)
- McHale's Navy (1964) — Captain Wallace B. Binghamton
- McHale's Navy Joins the Air Force (1965) — Captain Wallace B. Binghamton
- Divorce American Style (1967) — Lionel Blandsforth
- Did You Hear the One About the Traveling Saleslady? (1968) — Hubert Shelton
- I Dream of Jeannie (1968) (Season 4 Episode 11: "Dr. Bellows Goes Sane") — Dr. Corbett
- The Love Bug (1969) — Havershaw
- My Dog, the Thief (1969) — P.J. Applegate
- The Computer Wore Tennis Shoes (1969) — Dean Higgins
- That Girl (1970) — as Uncle Herbert, season 5 episode 13 "An Uncle Herbert for All Seasons"
- The Wonderful World of Disney (1970) — Mayor Philbrick, in two-part episode "The Wacky Zoo of Morgan City"
- How to Frame a Figg (1971) — Kermit Sanderson
- The Barefoot Executive (1971) — Francis X. Wilbanks
- The Million Dollar Duck (1971) — Finley Hooper
- Sesame Street (1971) -Himself
- Now You See Him, Now You Don't (1972) — Dean Higgins
- Gentle Savage (1973) — Chief Deputy Moody
- Superdad (1973) — Cyrus Hershberger
- Match Game (1974) - Himself, Guest Panelist (5 episodes)
- The Strongest Man in the World (1975) — Dean Higgins (posthumous release)
- The Rescuers (1977) — Mr. Snoops (voice) (final film role, posthumous release)
