= Now You See Him, Now You Don't =

1972 film by Robert Butler

- Theatrical release poster
- Directed by: Robert Butler
- Screenplay by: Joseph L. McEveety
- Story by: Robert L. King
- Produced by: Ron Miller
- Starring: Kurt Russell; Cesar Romero; Joe Flynn; Jim Backus; William Windom
- Cinematography: Frank V. Phillips
- Edited by: Cotton Warburton
- Music by: Robert F. Brunner
- Production company: Walt Disney Productions
- Distributed by: Buena Vista Distribution
- Release date: July 12, 1972
- Running time: 88 minutes
- Country: United States
- Language: English
- Box office: $4,610,000 (US/Canada) (rentals)

Now You See Him, Now You Don't is a 1972 American science fiction comedy film starring Kurt Russell as a chemistry student who accidentally discovers the secret to invisibility. It is the second film in the Dexter Riley series, following 1969's The Computer Wore Tennis Shoes, and followed by 1975's The Strongest Man in the World.

Now You See Him, Now You Don't was the first Disney film to be shown on television in a two-hour time slot, in 1975. Previous television showings of Disney films had either shown them edited or split into two one-hour time slots.

== Plot ==
At Medfield College, science enthusiast Dexter Riley and his friends, including Richard Schuyler and Debbie Dawson, secretly listen to a board meeting, where Dean Higgins discusses the college's precarious finances. Later, Professor Lufkin shows Higgins the science lab, where Dexter is conducting an invisibility experiment. That night, a thunderstorm strikes the lab, damaging Dexter's equipment. The next day, Dexter discovers that his experimental formula has rendered part of his glasses invisible. Further tests reveal that the substance causes temporary invisibility and can be rinsed off with water.

Higgins introduces a surprise visitor: A.J. Arno, a recently released criminal who now owns the college's mortgage. Two years prior, Dexter had helped expose Arno’s gambling scheme. Suspicious of Arno’s true intentions, Dexter and Schuyler use the invisibility formula to sneak into his office. There, they find documents proving that gambling is legal on college land due to a 1912 statute, and that Arno plans to turn Medfield into a gambling town.

Dexter shows their findings to Lufkin and Higgins. Dexter proposes entering the upcoming Forsythe science contest with his invisibility formula to win prize money, but Higgins dismisses the idea, preferring to focus on Druffle’s bumblebee study. But Medfield has actually been dropped from the contest. Hoping to get them reinstated, Higgins meets contest sponsor Timothy Forsythe for golf. To help, Dexter hides while invisible and manipulates Higgins’ shots, astonishing everyone with a series of hole-in-ones. Impressed, Forsythe agrees to let Medfield reenter the contest.

However, Arno spots Dexter becoming visible in the showers and grows suspicious. When Higgins is invited to play in a pro golf tournament, he accepts, believing he can win enough to save the college. Dexter misses the plane and watches helplessly as Higgins’ performance without help is a disaster. Arno watches too, puzzled by the inconsistencies.

Back on campus, Higgins and Lufkin place their hopes on Druffle’s experiment, but have to change plans when Druffle ends up heavily bandaged after a bee attack. Lufkin suggests giving Dexter’s invisibility formula a chance, and Higgins reluctantly agrees.

That night, Arno's chauffeur Cookie, disguised as a janitor, spies on Dexter and Schuyler using the formula and later steals it. During the demonstration to Forsythe, Dexter unknowingly uses the switched, ineffective spray. Embarrassed, the students lose their shot at winning the prize. Later, Dexter learns from a janitor that there is no night staff, confirming Cookie’s theft. He plants a walkie-talkie in Arno’s office and Schuyler hears plans for an invisible bank heist.

Schuyler goes to the police while Dexter warns the bank president, but both are dismissed. When the invisible Arno and Cookie carry out the heist, Dexter tries to douse them with water but fails. A chaotic car chase ensues, ending when Dexter and his friends force Arno’s invisible car into a swimming pool, rendering the car, Arno, Cookie, and the money visible. The criminals are arrested.

The friends retrieve the invisibility spray from the pool and rush to the Forsythe Award ceremony to plead for another chance. When the demonstration again fails, Higgins declares invisibility doesn’t exist—just as his upper body turns invisible, shocking the crowd. Medfield wins the $50,000 prize to save the school for another year.

== Cast ==
- Kurt Russell as Dexter Riley
- Cesar Romero as A.J. Arno
- Joe Flynn as Dean Eugene Higgins
- Jim Backus as Timothy Forsythe
- William Windom as Professor Lufkin
- Michael McGreevey as Richard Schuyler
- Richard Bakalyan as Cookie
- Joyce Menges as Debbie Dawson
- Alan Hewitt as Dean Edgar Collingswood
- Kelly Thordsen as Police Sergeant Cassidy
- Neil Russell as Alfred
- George O'Hanlon as Ted, Bank Guard
- John Myhers as Golfer
- Pat Delany as Winifred Keesely, Higgins' Secretary
- Robert Rothwell as Driver
- Frank Aletter as TV Announcer
- Dave Willock as Mr. Burns
- Edward Andrews as Wilfred A. Sampson
- Frank Welker as Henry Farthington
- Mike Evans as Myles
- Ed Begley Jr. as Lancelot Druffle
- Billy Casper and Dave Hill as themselves

== Notable uncredited cast members ==
- Alvin Hammer as Elwood
- Burt Mustin as Mr. Reed
- Eddie Quillan as Charlie the Janitor
- Edward Faulkner as Bank Guard Mike

== Production notes ==
=== Locations ===
The Medfield College exteriors were on the Disney lot: the main Medfield College building and courtyard used in the title sequence was the old Animation Building at the corner of Mickey Avenue and Dopey Drive. Parts of the chase scenes were done along the main street that goes through the area of the golf courses in Griffith Park.

=== Props ===
The green Volkswagen Beetle used by Schuyler was two Herbie cars from The Love Bug: one was the vehicle carried by Tang Wu's Chinese Camp students (this was a gutted car and a rubber truck tire tube was placed under the passenger door, and when inflated suddenly, it would tip the car over, this car used in the scene where A.J. Arno rams it). The other car was used in the scenes with Schuyler driving it on a flat tire (the Art Dept. painted the car green and dusted it to give a look of neglect; when the sunroof is open, the original Herbie pearl white paint job under the tarp sunroof can be seen where the green was not painted).

== Comic adaptations ==
A text piece with illustrations adapting the film appeared in Walt Disney Comics Digest #37 (Oct. 1972) with a production still on the cover. The Walt Disney's Treasury of Classic Tales comic strip ran an adaptation written by Frank Reilly and drawn by John Uslher that appeared between April 2 and June 25, 1972.

== Reception ==
The film received a mixed reception. A negative review came from The New York Times, which accorded: "Now with all due respect to children's intuition and judgment, may we suggest that they now try the Real McCoy, if they haven't already. How about the original "The Invisible Man" on television? There's grand, serious fun, kids. Plus—square or not—something to think about". A positive review came from Arthur D. Murphy of Variety, who wrote that "virtually all the key creative elements which early in 1970 made The Computer Wore Tennis Shoes a successful... Walt Disney feature have encored superbly in Now You See Him, Now You Don't". Gene Siskel of the Chicago Tribune gave the film three stars out of four and called it "one of the more clever entertainments for children designed by Disney Studios". Charles Champlin of the Los Angeles Times called it "a modest program picture with a notably professional cast and offering special effects which are workmanlike rather than inspired".

== See also ==
- Dexter Riley
- List of American films of 1972
