= The Strongest Man in the World =

1975 film by Vincent McEveety

- Theatrical release poster
- Directed by: Vincent McEveety
- Written by: Joseph L. McEveety; Herman Groves
- Produced by: Bill Anderson
- Starring: Kurt Russell; Joe Flynn; Eve Arden; Cesar Romero; Phil Silvers
- Cinematography: Andrew Jackson
- Edited by: Cotton Warburton
- Music by: Robert F. Brunner Ardy Arci
- Production company: Walt Disney Productions
- Distributed by: Buena Vista Distribution
- Release date: February 6, 1975
- Running time: 92 minutes
- Country: United States
- Language: English
- Box office: $6.6 million (US/Canada rentals)

The Strongest Man in the World is a 1975 American science fiction comedy film directed by Vincent McEveety, produced by Walt Disney Productions, and starring Kurt Russell, Joe Flynn (in his first of two posthumous roles) and Eve Arden. It was the third and final film in the Dexter Riley series.

== Plot ==
Medfield College's Dean Higgins is about to be fired for financial mismanagement due to extreme overspending by Prof. Quigley's science class. Higgins finds out the high costs are for renting a cow as a test subject; they are feeding it various concoctions to make it fatter. In a rage, Higgins fires Quigley then threatens to have his entire class thrown out of college. When the dean slams the door as he leaves, Dexter Riley's chemical experiment mixes with that of another student, Richard Schuyler's vitamin cereal mix.

When the cow eats some of the cereal into which the mixture has leaked, the students learn that the cereal gave the cow the ability to produce a huge supply of milk, over 80 gallons. When Dexter eats it the next morning he gains super-strength, as does the fraternity house's pet dog.

Dexter shows the dean and Quigley his super-strength by picking up an obese kid in a chair with the right hand and Schuyler with the left. Higgins jumps on this as an opportunity to get Medfield out of its financial slump and keep the Board of Regents from firing him. Higgins takes the formula-laced cereal to the board of the Crumply Crunch cereal company and demonstrates its effects to the board and its president, Aunt Harriet Crumply. They decide to advertise the powers of the formula-laced cereal by challenging Krinkle Krunch, a rival cereal company run by Mr. Kirwood Krinkle, to a competition between their sponsored weight-lifting team and Medfield's to see which cereal can give the other greater strength. Krinkle sponsors the well-funded State College.

Krinkle has a mole named Harry on the inside who tells the Krinkle president about the formula. Hearing this, he hires A. J. Arno and some of his goons, just released from prison, to steal it. They break in, but are almost caught before they can get it. They then kidnap Schuyler (as no one knows that Dexter's chemical was the vital ingredient of the formula, rather than Schuyler's vitamins). They take him to Chinatown where they use Chinese acupuncture and hypnotism to get the formula. They then hypnotize him to return home and not tell what happened to him. This accidentally causes him to steal a police car, leading to a car chase which gets him thrown in jail. Fortunately, without Dexter's chemical added in, the formula Krinkle Krunch has in the cereal does not give super-strength; when Krinkle tries it, he ends up breaking his hand. While he berates Harry on the phone, Harry realizes that if they do not know that the formula does not work, then Medfield does not know either and will lose the weight-lifting competition.

On the day of the competition, Dexter realizes it was his formula that gave the cereal super-strength; he sets off to the lab to get it, taking the Dean's beautiful but slow vintage car. When he finally gets there, he is confronted by Arno and 10 of his goons. By drinking some of the formula, Dexter is able to defeat all the men, discovers Harry, then uses him to strike Arno and his men down like bowling pins. He hears on the radio that he must return to the contest in four minutes or forfeit. He adds some formula to the car's fuel tank, which makes it race off at high speed, shedding parts as it goes. He makes it in time to compete last, but the car is destroyed, to the Dean's horror.

Medfield is losing badly, but Dexter uses the last of his super-strength to lift the 1,111 pound weight and win it for Crumply Crunch and Medfield. Higgins and Quigley get to keep their jobs, and the scheming Krinkle breaks his hand again after eating ordinary cereal.

== Cast ==
- Kurt Russell as Dexter Riley
- Joe Flynn as Dean Higgins
- Eve Arden as Aunt Harriet Crumply
- Cesar Romero as A. J. Arno
- Phil Silvers as Mr. Kirwood Krinkle
- Dick Van Patten as Harry
- Harold Gould as Regent Dietz
- Michael McGreevey as Richard Schuyler
- Richard Bakalyan as Cookie
- William Schallert as Quigley
- Benson Fong as Ah Fong
- James Gregory as Chief Blair
- Ann Marshall as Debbie
- Don Carter as Gilbert
- Christina Anderson as Cris
- Paul Linke as Peter "Porky" Peterson
- Jack David Walker as Slither Roth
- Melissa Caffey as Melissa
- John Debney as John
- Derrel Maury as Hector
- Matthew Conway Dunn as Matthew
- Pat Fitzpatrick as Pat
- David R. Ellis as David
- Larry Franco as Larry
- Roy Roberts as Mr. Roberts
- Fritz Feld as Uncle Frederick
- Ronnie Schell as Referee
- Raymond Bailey as Regent Burns
- John Myhers as Mr. Roscoe
- James Brodhead as Cousin Edward
- Dick Patterson as Mr. Secretary
- Irwin Charone as Irwin
- Roger Price as Roger
- Jack Bailey as Jack
- Larry Gelman as Larry
- Eric Brotherson as Eric
- Jonathan Daly as TV Announcer
- Kathleen Freeman as Officer Hurley
- Iggie Wolfington as Mr. Becker
- Ned Wertimer as Mr. Parsons
- Milton Frome as Mr. Lufkin
- Laurie Main as Mr. Reedy
- Mary Treen as Mercedes
- Eddie Quillan as Mr. Willoughby
- Jeff DeBenning as Mr. Rogers
- Henry Slate as Mr. Slate
- Byron Webster as Mr. Webster
- Burt Mustin as Regent Appleby
- Arthur Space as Regent Shaw
- Bill Zuckert as Policeman
- Larry J. Blake as Pete
- William Bakewell as Professor
- Art Metrano as TV Color Man
- Peter Renaday as Reporter
- Lennie Weinrib as State Coach
- Danny Wells as Drummer
- James Beach as TV Man

== Reception ==
Vincent Canby of The New York Times described it as "a Walt Disney comedy based on the old magic-formula story that's served the company well through thick (The Absent-Minded Professor) and thin (The Computer Wore Tennis Shoes). The new film, which opened at theaters throughout the city yesterday, is nowhere near as funny as the first but a lot better than the second". Stuart Oldham of Variety remarked that "the students of Medfield College unintentionally zap the laws of nature with unexpected and sometimes hilarious results".

On Metacritic the film has a score of 63% based on reviews from 4 critics, indicating "generally favorable reviews".

== See also ==
- Dexter Riley (film series)
- List of American films of 1975
