= Kurt Russell =

American actor (born 1951)

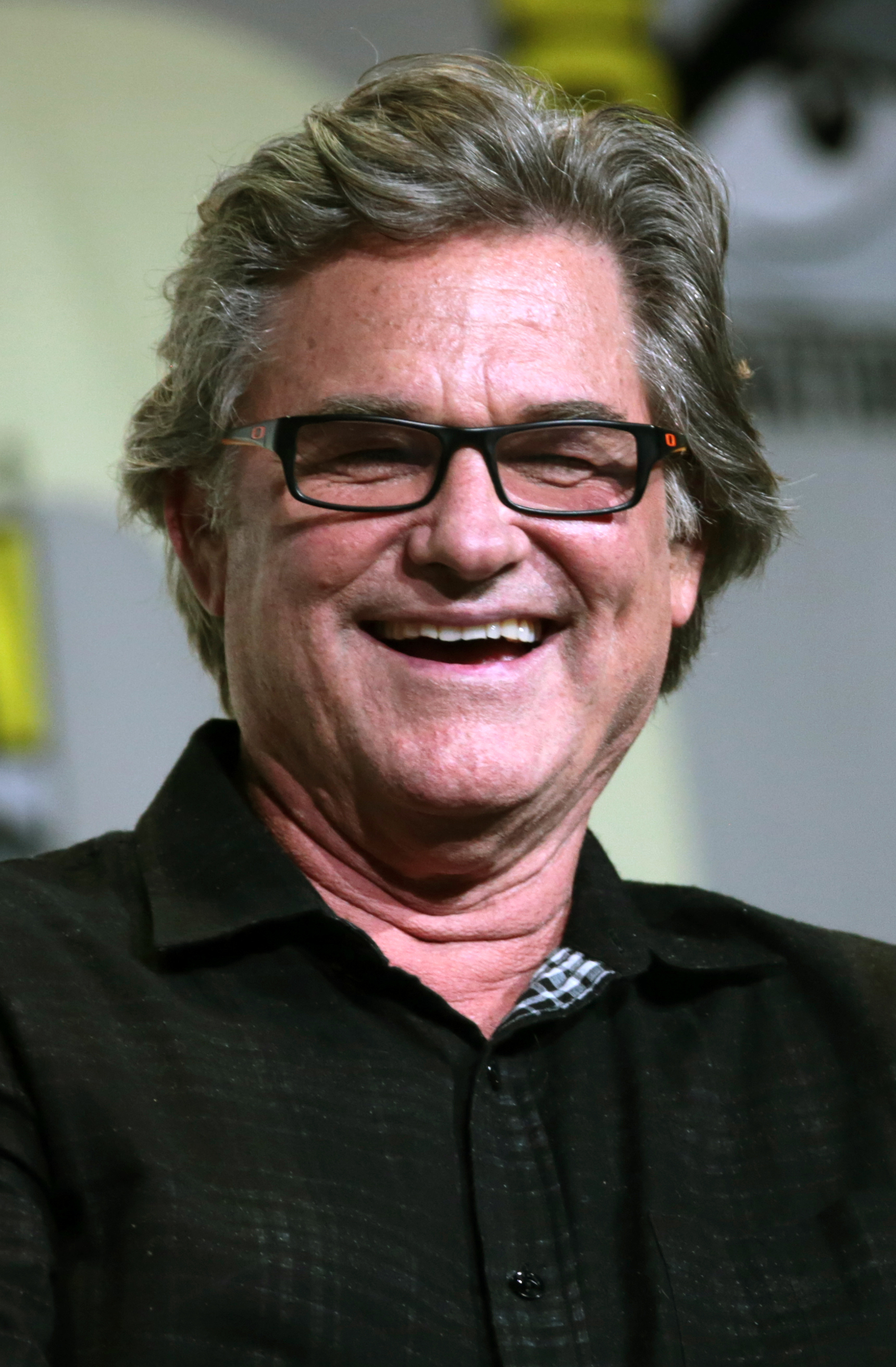
- Russell at the 2016 San Diego Comic-Con
- Born: Kurt Vogel Russell; March 17, 1951 (age 75); Springfield, Massachusetts, U.S.
- Occupation: Actor
- Years active: 1962–present
- Spouse: Season Hubley (m. 1979; div. 1983)
- Partner: Goldie Hawn (1983–present)
- Children: 2, including Wyatt
- Parent: Bing Russell (father)
- Relatives: Matt Franco (nephew)

Kurt Vogel Russell (born March 17, 1951) is an American actor. He began his career as a child actor before transitioning to leading roles as an adult in various genres such as action adventures, science-fiction, westerns, romance films, comedic films, and family dramas. He is known for collaborating with filmmakers such as John Carpenter and Quentin Tarantino, and has received a Critics' Choice Super Award as well as various award nominations, including for a Primetime Emmy Award and a Golden Globe Award.

At the age of 12, he began acting in the Western TV series The Travels of Jaimie McPheeters (1963–1964). In the late 1960s, he signed a ten-year contract with Walt Disney Productions, starring in films such as The Computer Wore Tennis Shoes (1969), Now You See Him, Now You Don't (1972), and The Strongest Man in the World (1975). For his portrayal of rock and roll superstar Elvis Presley in the television film Elvis (1979), he was nominated for the Primetime Emmy Award for Outstanding Lead Actor in a Limited Series or Movie.

Russell was nominated for a Golden Globe Award for Best Supporting Actor – Motion Picture for his role in Mike Nichols's Silkwood (1983). He collaborated with director John Carpenter playing antiheroes in the action films Escape from New York (1981) and its sequel Escape from L.A. (1996), the horror film The Thing (1982), and the comedy action film Big Trouble in Little China (1986). Russell also acted in Used Cars (1980), The Fox and the Hound (1981), The Best of Times (1986), Overboard (1987), Backdraft (1991), Captain Ron (1992), Tombstone (1993), Stargate (1994), Vanilla Sky (2001), Miracle (2004), Dreamer, Sky High (both 2005), Death Proof (2007), The Hateful Eight (2015), Bone Tomahawk (2015), and Once Upon a Time in Hollywood (2019).

Russell has also acted in several franchises, portraying Mr. Nobody in three films of the Fast & Furious franchise from 2015 to 2021, Ego in the Marvel Cinematic Universe (MCU) installments Guardians of the Galaxy Vol. 2 (2017) and What If...? (2021), and Santa Claus in the Netflix films The Christmas Chronicles (2018) and The Christmas Chronicles 2 (2020).

== Early life and work ==
Kurt Vogel Russell was born on March 17, 1951, at Wesson Maternity Hospital in Springfield, Massachusetts. His father, Bing Russell, was also an actor. His mother, Louise Julia (née Crone) Russell, was a dancer. Russell has three sisters, Jill Franco, Jamie and Jody. His older sister, Jill, is the mother of former professional baseball player Matt Franco.

His family relocated to California when he was a child, and Russell grew up in Thousand Oaks. Russell played little league baseball throughout his grade school years and also on his high school baseball team as a second baseman. He graduated from Thousand Oaks High School in California in 1969.

Russell followed in his father's footsteps in signing a minor league contract in 1971 and played two seasons in the Class A Northwest League where he was an all-star infielder. In the early 1970s, Russell was a switch-hitting second baseman for the California Angels minor league affiliates, the Bend Rainbows (1971) and Walla Walla Islanders (1972) in the short season Class A-Short Season Northwest League, then moved up to Class AA in 1973 with the El Paso Sun Kings of the Texas League.

While Russell was in the field turning the pivot of a double play early in the season, the incoming runner at second base collided with him and tore the rotator cuff in Russell's right (throwing) shoulder. He did not return to El Paso, but was a designated hitter for the independent Portland Mavericks in the Northwest League late in their short season. The team was owned by his father, and he had been doing promotional work for them in the interim. The injury forced his retirement from baseball in 1973 and led to his return to acting. From 1969 to 1975, Russell served in the California Air National Guard and belonged to the 146th Tactical Airlift Wing, then based in Van Nuys.

== Career ==
=== 1963–1979: Child actor with Disney and stardom ===
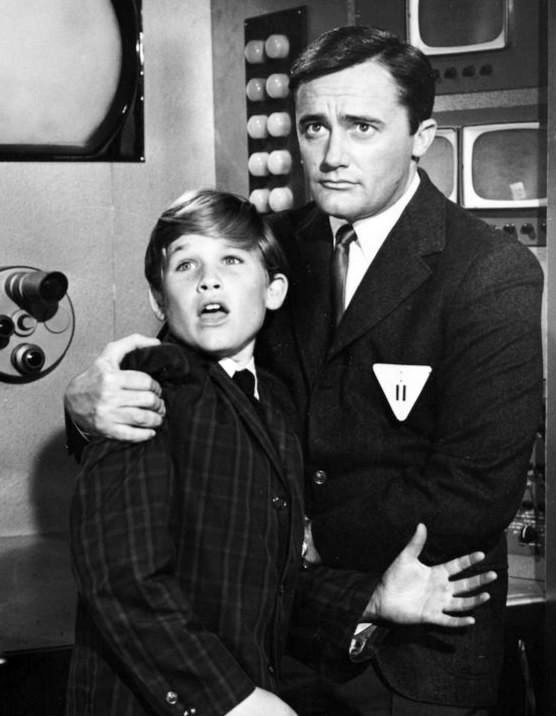
Russell with Robert Vaughn in a 1964 episode of The Man from U.N.C.L.E.

Russell made his film debut with an uncredited part for It Happened at the World's Fair, playing a boy who kicked a pilot (Elvis Presley) in the leg. On April 24, 1963, Russell guest-starred in the ABC series Our Man Higgins, starring Stanley Holloway as an English butler in an American family. Later, he played the title role in the ABC Western series The Travels of Jaimie McPheeters (1963–64). The show was based on Robert Lewis Taylor's eponymous novel, which won the Pulitzer Prize for fiction in 1959. In 1964, Russell guest-starred in "Nemesis", an episode of the ABC series The Fugitive in which, as the son of police Lt. Phillip Gerard, he is unintentionally kidnapped by his father's quarry, Doctor Richard Kimble. In NBC's The Virginian, he played the mistaken orphan whose father, played by Rory Calhoun, was an outlaw who was still alive and recently released from prison looking for his son. Russell played a similar role as a kid named Packy Kerlin in the 1964 episode "Blue Heaven" for the Western series Gunsmoke. At age 13, Russell played the role of Jungle Boy on an episode of CBS's Gilligan's Island, which aired on February 6, 1965.

In 1966, Russell was signed to a ten-year contract with Walt Disney Productions, where he became, according to Robert Osborne of Turner Classic Movies, the "studio's top star of the '70s". Russell's first film for Disney was Follow Me, Boys! (1966). Walt Disney described Russell as "a 15-year-old boy for whom I predict a great acting future", in what would prove to be Disney's last filmed appearance before his death in December 1966. One of the last things Disney ever wrote was the name "Kurt Russell" (though misspelled as "Kirt") on a piece of paper. In January 1967, Russell played Private Willie Prentiss in the episode "Willie and the Yank: The Mosby Raiders" in Walt Disney's Wonderful World of Color, released theatrically in some markets as Mosby's Marauders (1967). During this time, Russell continued to guest star on non-Disney TV shows. He, Jay C. Flippen and Tom Tryon appeared in the episode "Charade of Justice" of the NBC Western series The Road West starring Barry Sullivan. In a March 1966 episode of CBS's Lost in Space entitled "The Challenge", he played Quano, the son of a planetary ruler.

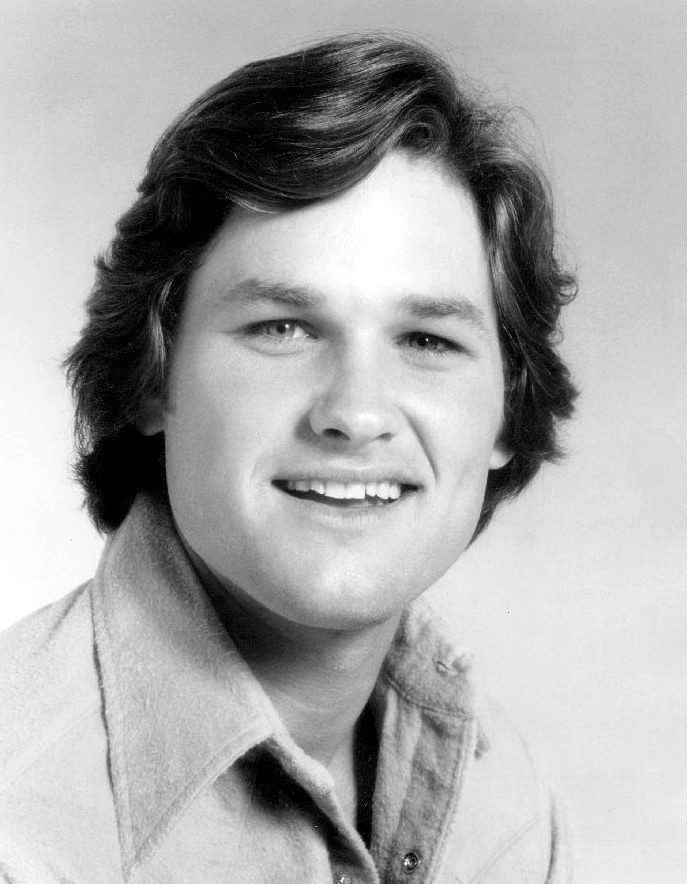
Russell in a 1974 publicity photo

While filming the Sherman Brothers musical The One and Only, Genuine, Original Family Band (1968), Russell met his future partner Goldie Hawn. For Disney, he made The Horse in the Gray Flannel Suit (1969) and Guns in the Heather (1969). Disney promoted Russell to star roles with The Computer Wore Tennis Shoes (1969) which was a big hit. He followed it with The Barefoot Executive (1971), another success. In 1971, he co-starred as a young robber released from jail alongside James Stewart in Fools' Parade. Later, he guest-starred in an episode of Room 222 as an idealistic high school student who assumed the costumed identity of Paul Revere to warn of the dangers of pollution. However, the bulk of his film work was for Disney in films such as Now You See Him, Now You Don't (1971), Charley and the Angel (1973), and Superdad (1973). In the autumn of 1974, he appeared in the ABC series The New Land, inspired by the 1972 Swedish film of the same name. Critically acclaimed, it suffered very low ratings and aired only six of the 13 episodes. He returned to Disney for The Strongest Man in the World (1975).

=== 1980–1999: Transition into Hollywood ===
Russell played the title character in the 1979 television film Elvis, in which his then-wife Season Hubley played Priscilla. This would transition Russell's Hollywood career after years as a child actor. It was directed by John Carpenter and led to a series of collaborations between the two men. His performance earned him a nomination for the Primetime Emmy Award for Outstanding Lead Actor in a Limited Series or Movie. Russell starred in Amber Waves (1980) and the comedy Used Cars (1980). Russell then played the surly anti-hero Snake Plissken in the acclaimed dystopian science fiction film, Escape from New York (1981), directed by Carpenter, in an image-changing opportunity Russell welcomed to escape his Disney typecasting.

He returned to Disney to provide the voice of Copper as an adult for The Fox and the Hound (1981) then reunited with Carpenter for The Thing (1982), based upon the short story Who Goes There? by John W. Campbell, Jr., which had been interpreted on film before, albeit loosely, in 1951's The Thing from Another World. He was nominated for the Golden Globe Award for Best Supporting Actor – Motion Picture for his performance in Silkwood (1983). Russell made Swing Shift (1984) co-starring Goldie Hawn, who became his romantic partner. He starred in The Mean Season (1985) and The Best of Times (1986), then played an antihero truck driver caught in an ancient Chinese war in Big Trouble in Little China (1986), another Carpenter film which, like The Thing, was initially a critical and commercial disappointment but has since gained a cult audience. More popular at the box office was Overboard (1987), a comedy with Goldie Hawn. Russell credited his performance in Tequila Sunrise (1988) with getting Hollywood to regard him differently. He starred in Winter People (1989) and co-starred with Sylvester Stallone in Tango & Cash (1989).

Russell followed this up by playing Lt. Stephen "Bull" McCaffrey in the drama Backdraft (1991), Michael Carr in the psychological thriller Unlawful Entry (1992), a sailor in the comedy Captain Ron (1992), and Colonel Jack O'Neil in the military science fiction film Stargate (1994). He also played Wyatt Earp in the hit Western film Tombstone (1993). Russell later claimed in a 2006 interview that he had ghost-directed Tombstone on behalf of credited director George P. Cosmatos, saying he gave Cosmatos shot lists. Russell claimed Stallone recommended Cosmatos to him after the removal of the first director, writer Kevin Jarre, but Cosmatos had also worked with Tombstone executive producer Andrew G. Vajna before on Rambo: First Blood Part II. Russell said he promised Cosmatos he would keep it a secret as long as Cosmatos was alive; Cosmatos died in April 2005. Russell said he did not get a chance to edit his version, but Vajna gave him a tape of "everything on the movie" and that he might try to "reconstruct the movie", although he would need to go back to the script and all his notes.

Russell also had an uncredited role as the voice of Elvis Presley in the 1994 film Forrest Gump. In 1996, Russell starred as a military intelligence consultant in the action film Executive Decision, and again played Snake Plissken in Carpenter's follow-up to Escape from New York, Escape from L.A. He then starred as the husband of a kidnapped woman in the action thriller Breakdown (1997), and as a genetically enhanced soldier in the science fiction film Soldier (1998).

=== 2000–present: Franchise films and resurgence ===
In 2001, Russell played a court psychologist in the thriller film Vanilla Sky. His portrayal of U.S. Olympic hockey coach Herb Brooks in the 2004 film Miracle, won the praise of critics. "In many ways", wrote Claudia Puig of USA Today, "Miracle belongs to Kurt Russell." Roger Ebert of the Chicago Sun-Times wrote, "Russell does real acting here." Elvis Mitchell of The New York Times wrote, "Mr. Russell's cagey and remote performance gives Miracle its few breezes of fresh air." In 2005, he played a horse trainer father in the family sports film Dreamer and a father with superhuman strength in the superhero film Sky High.

Russell starred in Wolfgang Petersen's Poseidon (2006). He also played the villainous Stuntman Mike in Quentin Tarantino's segment Death Proof of the film Grindhouse (2007), and was in two more Tarantino films, The Hateful Eight (2015) and Once Upon a Time in Hollywood (2019). After a remake of Escape from New York was announced, Russell was reportedly upset that Gerard Butler was attached to play his signature character, Snake Plissken, as he believed the character "was quintessentially [...] American." Russell appeared in The Battered Bastards of Baseball, a documentary about his father and the Portland Mavericks, which debuted at the Sundance Film Festival in 2014. In 2015, Russell garnered attention for his portrayal of Sheriff Franklin Hunt in the Western-horror film Bone Tomahawk. In 2017, Russell received a star on the Hollywood Walk of Fame.

During this time, Russell also appeared in the Fast & Furious franchise playing Mr. Nobody, starring in three of its films, Furious 7 (2015), The Fate of the Furious (2017), and F9 (2021). In 2016, he starred as Jimmy Harrell in Deepwater Horizon, a film about the 2010 Deepwater Horizon oil spill. On May 4, 2017, Russell and Goldie Hawn received stars in a double star ceremony on the Hollywood Walk of Fame for their achievements in motion pictures, located at 6201 Hollywood Boulevard. In 2017 he played Star-Lord's father Ego in the Marvel Cinematic Universe film Guardians of the Galaxy Vol. 2 (2017). Todd McCarthy of The Hollywood Reporter praised the chemistry between Chris Pratt and Russell writing, "the scenes between the well-cast Russell and Pratt are the best in the film". Russell played Santa Claus in the Netflix films The Christmas Chronicles (2018) and The Christmas Chronicles 2 (2020). From 2021 to 2023, he reprised his role as Ego in the MCU Disney+ animated series What If...? voicing the role in the episodes "What If... T'Challa Became a Star-Lord?", "What If... the Watcher Broke His Oath?" and "What If... Peter Quill Attacked Earth's Mightiest Heroes?". In 2025, it was announced that Russell would join the cast of the Yellowstone spin-off The Madison.

== Personal life ==
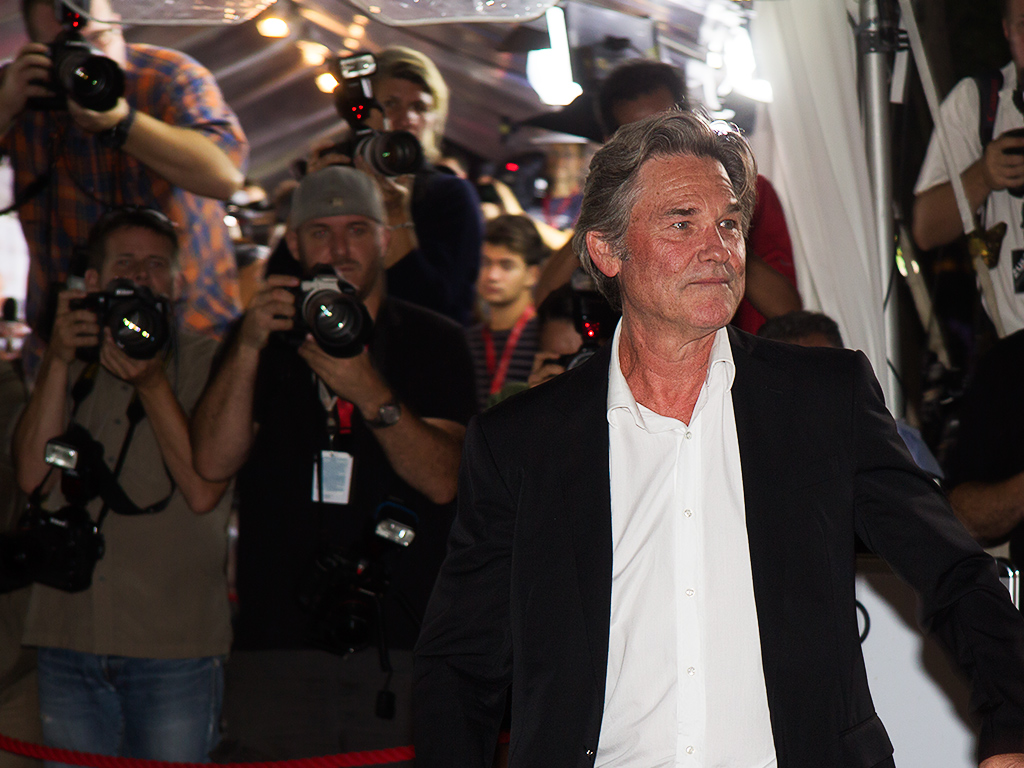
Russell at the 2013 Toronto International Film Festival

Russell married actress Season Hubley, whom he met while filming Elvis, in 1979, and they had a son, Boston (born February 16, 1980). After his divorce from Hubley in 1983, Russell began his relationship with Goldie Hawn, and appeared alongside her in Swing Shift and Overboard, having previously appeared with her in The One and Only, Genuine, Original Family Band in 1968.

Russell and Hawn have a son, Wyatt Russell (born July 10, 1986). In February 2003, they moved to Vancouver, British Columbia, so that Wyattt could play ice hockey, and have also owned homes in Snowmass Village, Colorado, Manhattan, New York, Brentwood, and Palm Desert, California. In an interview with People in December 2020, Russell revealed that he and Hawn never felt the need to marry, stating that a "marriage certificate wasn't going to create anything that otherwise we wouldn't have."

Russell is a libertarian. In 2020, he stated that celebrities should keep their political opinions to themselves, believing that it negatively impacts their work. Russell is a hunter and a staunch supporter of gun rights, and said that gun control will not reduce terrorism. He is also an FAA-licensed private pilot holding single/multi-engine and instrument ratings, and is an Honorary Council Member of the humanitarian aviation organization Wings of Hope. In 2010, he was inducted as part of the Living Legends of Aviation, receiving the "Aviation Mentor Award" from fellow actor-pilot John Travolta. On March 13, 1997, Russell became the sole general aviation pilot to witness and report the Phoenix Lights while flying into the city with his son Oliver.

== Filmography ==
=== Film ===
Year	Title	Role	Notes	Ref.
1963	It Happened at the World's Fair	Boy Kicking Mike (Appears Twice)	Uncredited cameos	
1964	Guns of Diablo	Jamie McPheeters		
1966	Follow Me, Boys!	Whitey		
1967	Mosby's Marauders	Willie Prentiss		
1968	The One and Only, Genuine, Original Family Band	Sidney Bower		
1968	The Horse in the Gray Flannel Suit	Ronnie Gardner		
1969	The Computer Wore Tennis Shoes	Dexter Riley		
1971	The Barefoot Executive	Steven Post		
1971	Fools' Parade	Johnny Jesus		
1972	Now You See Him, Now You Don't	Dexter Riley		
1973	Charley and the Angel	Ray Ferris		
1973	Superdad	Bart		
1975	The Strongest Man in the World	Dexter Riley		
1980	Used Cars	Rudy Russo		
1981	Escape from New York	Snake Plissken		
1981	The Fox and the Hound	Copper	Voice	
1982	The Thing	R.J. MacReady		
1983	Silkwood	Drew Stephens		
1984	Swing Shift	Lucky Lockhart		
1985	The Mean Season	Malcolm Anderson		
1986	The Best of Times	Reno Hightower		
1986	Big Trouble in Little China	Jack Burton		
1987	Overboard	Dean Proffitt		
1988	Tequila Sunrise	Nick Frescia		
1989	Winter People	Wayland Jackson		
1989	Tango & Cash	Lieutenant Gabriel Cash		
1991	Backdraft	Lieutenant Stephen "Bull" McCaffrey / Captain Dennis McCaffrey	Dual role; also stunt	
1992	Unlawful Entry	Michael Carr		
1992	Captain Ron	Captain Ron Rico		
1993	Tombstone	Wyatt Earp		
1994	Forrest Gump	Elvis Presley	Uncredited voice	
1994	Stargate	Jack O'Neill		
1996	Executive Decision	Dr. David Grant		
1996	Escape from L.A.	Snake Plissken	Also writer and producer	
1997	Breakdown	Jeff Taylor		
1998	Soldier	Sergeant Todd "3465"		
2001	3000 Miles to Graceland	Michael Zane		
2001	Vanilla Sky	Curtis McCabe		
2002	Interstate 60	Captain Ives		
2002	Dark Blue	Eldon Perry		
2004	Miracle	Herb Brooks		
2004	Jiminy Glick in Lalawood	Himself		
2005	Sky High	Steve Stronghold / The Commander		
2005	Dreamer	Ben Crane		
2006	Poseidon	Robert Ramsey		
2007	Death Proof	Stuntman Mike McKay		
2007	Cutlass	Dad	Short film	
2011	Touchback	Coach Hand		
2013	The Art of the Steal	Crunch Calhoun		
2014	The Battered Bastards of Baseball	Himself	Documentary	
2015	Furious 7	Mr. Nobody		
2015	Bone Tomahawk	Sheriff Franklin Hunt		
2015	The Hateful Eight	John "The Hangman" Ruth		
2016	Deepwater Horizon	Jimmy Harrell		
2017	The Fate of the Furious	Mr. Nobody		
2017	Guardians of the Galaxy Vol. 2	Ego the Living Planet		
2018	The Christmas Chronicles	Santa Claus		
2019	Crypto	Martin Duran, Sr.		
2019	Once Upon a Time in Hollywood	Randy Lloyd / The Narrator	Dual role	
2019	QT8: The First Eight	Himself	Documentary	
2020	The Christmas Chronicles 2	Santa Claus	Also producer	
2021	F9	Mr. Nobody		
2025	Smurfs	Ron	Voice	
2026	The Rivals of Amziah King	Dob McCoy		

=== Television ===
Year	Title	Role	Notes	Ref.
1962	Dennis the Menace	Kevin	Episode: "Wilson's Second Childhood" (uncredited)	
1962	The Dick Powell Show	Boy / Vernon	3 episodes	
1963	Sam Benedict	Knute	Episode: "Seventeen Gypsies and a Sinner Named Charlie"	
1963	The Eleventh Hour	Peter Hall	Episode: "Everybody Knows You Left Me"	
1963	Our Man Higgins	Bobby	Episode: "Delinquent for a Day"	
1963–1964	The Travels of Jaimie McPheeters	Jaimie McPheeters	Series regular (26 episodes)	
1964	The Man from U.N.C.L.E.	Christopher Larson	Episode: "The Finny Foot Affair"	
1964–1965	The Virginian	Toby Shea / Andy Denning	2 episodes	
1964–1966	The Fugitive	Eddie / Philip Gerard Jr.	2 episodes	
1964, 1974	Gunsmoke	Packy Kerlin / Buck Henry	2 episodes	
1965	Gilligan's Island	Jungle Boy	Episode: "Gilligan Meets Jungle Boy"	
1965	The F.B.I.	Dan Winslow	Episode: "The Tormentors"	
1965–1969	Daniel Boone	Various	7 episodes	
1966	Lost in Space	Quano	Episode: "The Challenge"	
1966	Laredo	Grey Smoke	Episode: "Meanwhile, Back at the Reservation"	
1967	The Road West	Jay Baker	Episode: "Charade of Justice"	
1967–1976	Disneyland	Rich Evans / Pvt. Willie Prentiss / Narrator	7 episodes	
1969	Walt Disney's Wonderful World of Color	Rich Evans	Episode: "Guns in the Heather"	
1969	Then Came Bronson	William P. Lovering	Episode: "The Spitball Kid"	
1970	Storefront Lawyers	Jerry Patman	Episode: "This is Jerry, See Jerry Run"	
1970	The High Chaparral	Dan Rondo	Episode: "The Guns of Johnny Rondo"	
1970	Love, American Style	Johnny	Segment: "Love and the First-Nighters"	
1971	Room 222	Tim	Episode: "Paul Revere Rides Again"	
1973	Love Story	Scott	Episode: "Beginner's Luck"	
1974	Hec Ramsey	Matthias Kane	Episode: "Scar Tissue"	
1974	The New Land	Bo Larsen	Series regular (6 episodes, plus 7 unaired)	
1974–1975	Police Story	J.D. Crawford / Officer David Singer	2 episodes	
1975	Harry O	Todd Conway	Episode: "Double Jeopardy"	
1975	The Deadly Tower	Charles Whitman	TV film	
1975	Search for the Gods	Shan Mullins	TV film	
1976	The Quest	Morgan "Two Persons" Beaudine	Series regular (15 episodes)	
1976	The Quest: The Longest Drive	Morgan "Two Persons" Beaudine	TV film	
1977	Hawaii Five-O	Peter Valchek	Episode: "Deadly Doubles"	
1977	Christmas Miracle in Caufield, U.S.A.	Johnny	TV film	
1979	Elvis	Elvis Presley	TV film	
1980	Amber Waves	Laurence Kendall	TV film	
2021–2023	What If...?	Ego	Voice, 3 episodes	
2023–present	Monarch: Legacy of Monsters	Lee Shaw	Main role	
2026	The Madison	Preston Clyburn	Main role; also executive producer	

== Awards and nominations ==
Year	Award	Category	Nominated work	Results	Ref.
2003	AARP Movies for Grownups Awards	Best Breakaway Performance	Dark Blue	Nominated	
2004	AARP Movies for Grownups Awards	Best Actor	Miracle	Nominated	
2005	AARP Movies for Grownups Awards	Best Actor	Dreamer	Nominated	
1996	Blockbuster Entertainment Awards	Favorite Actor – Action/Adventure	Executive Decision	Won	
1998	Disney Legends Awards	Film Legends Award	—N/a	Inducted	
2002	DVD Exclusive Awards	Best Audio Commentary – Library Release	Used Cars	Nominated	
2016	Fangoria Chainsaw Awards	Best Actor	Bone Tomahawk	Won	
2016	Fangoria Chainsaw Awards	Fangoria Hall of Fame	—N/a	Won	
2015	Fright Meter Awards	Best Actor in a Leading Role	Bone Tomahawk	Nominated	
1983	Golden Globe Awards	Best Supporting Actor – Motion Picture	Silkwood	Nominated	
1989	Golden Raspberry Awards	Worst Supporting Actress	Tango & Cash	Nominated	
2001	Golden Raspberry Awards	Worst Screen Couple	3000 Miles to Graceland	Nominated	
2015	Hollywood Film Awards	Ensemble Award	The Hateful Eight	Won	
1982	Jupiter Awards	Best International Actor	Escape from New York	Nominated	
1983	Jupiter Awards	Best International Actor	The Thing	Nominated	
2019	Online Film & Television Association Awards	Best Ensemble	Once Upon a Time in Hollywood	Nominated	
1979	Primetime Emmy Awards	Outstanding Lead Actor in a Limited Series or a Special	Elvis	Nominated	
2002	Saturn Awards	The Life Career Award	—N/a	Won	
2025	Saturn Awards	Best Actor in a Television Series	Monarch: Legacy of Monsters	Nominated (Note: Shared with his son, Wyatt Russell.)	
2007	Scream Awards	Most Vile Villain	Death Proof	Nominated	
2004	Stinkers Bad Movie Awards	Worst Fake Accent – Male	Miracle	Nominated	
2017	Teen Choice Awards	Choice Hissy Fit	Guardians of the Galaxy Vol. 2	Nominated	
2021	Western Heritage Awards	Hall of Great Western Performers	—N/a	Inducted	
2024	Critics' Choice Super Awards	Best Actor in a Science Fiction/Fantasy Series or Movie	Monarch: Legacy of Monsters	Won (Note: Tied with Jharrel Jerome for I'm a Virgo.)	

== Bibliography ==
- Holmstrom, John. The Moving Picture Boy: An International Encyclopaedia from 1895 to 1995. Norwich, Michael Russell, 1996, p. 291–292.

== See also ==
- List of American libertarians
