= Stefanie Powers =

American actress (born 1942)

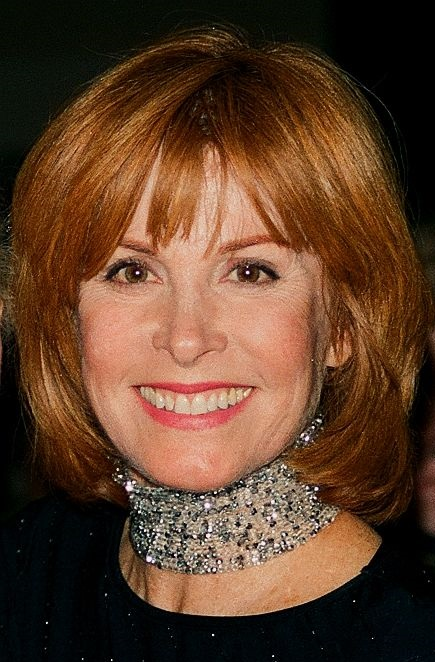
- Powers in 1998
- Born: Stefania Zofya Paul; November 2, 1942 (age 84); Los Angeles, California, U.S.
- Other name: Taffy Paul
- Education: Hollywood High School
- Occupation: Actress
- Years active: 1958–present
- Known for: The Interns; Herbie Rides Again; Hart to Hart
- Spouses: Gary Lockwood (m. 1966; div. 1972); Patrick de La Chesnais (m. 1993; div. 1999)
- Partners: William Holden (1972–1981; his death); Tom Carroll (2000–2014; his death)

Stefanie Powers (born November 2, 1942) is an American actress best known for her role as Jennifer Hart on the mystery television series Hart to Hart, for which she received nominations for two Primetime Emmy Awards and five Golden Globe Awards.

== Early life ==
Stefania Zofya Paul was born on November 2, 1942, in Los Angeles, in the Hollywood neighborhood. but her surname often was cited as Federkiewicz. In her Polish-language autobiography, Powers says, "Moje prawdziwe nazwisko to Federkiewicz", which translates to, "My real [Polish] name is Federkiewicz". At the age of 16, she was put under studio contract with Columbia Pictures, and as was the movie-industry custom in those days, a name change to the more Anglo-Saxon-sounding "Stefanie Powers" was part of the deal.

Her parents divorced during her childhood. Powers' father, Morrison Bloomfield Paul (1909–1993), a cinematographer, was born in Montreal to a Jewish immigrant family from Eastern Europe. Powers was estranged from her father, whom she barely refers to and whose name is never mentioned in her memoir One from the Hart, in which she refers to the "tension and unhappiness created by my father's presence". She remained very close throughout her life to her mother, who was born Juliana Dimitria Golan (1912–2009) on a farm near Middletown, New York to Catholic parents of Polish descent. Her mother, who died in Los Angeles from pneumonia at 96 years of age, was known late in life and in local obituaries as Julie Powers. Stefanie Powers had an older brother, Jeffrey Julian Paul (1940–2013), of Orangevale, California, as well as a half-sister, Diane Pascoe Hanson Baillie, who died in 2000. Powers was a pom pom girl at Hollywood High School and on the swim team.

== Career ==
In 1961, using the stage name Taffy Paul, Powers made Tom Laughlin's independent film The Young Sinner, released in 1965.

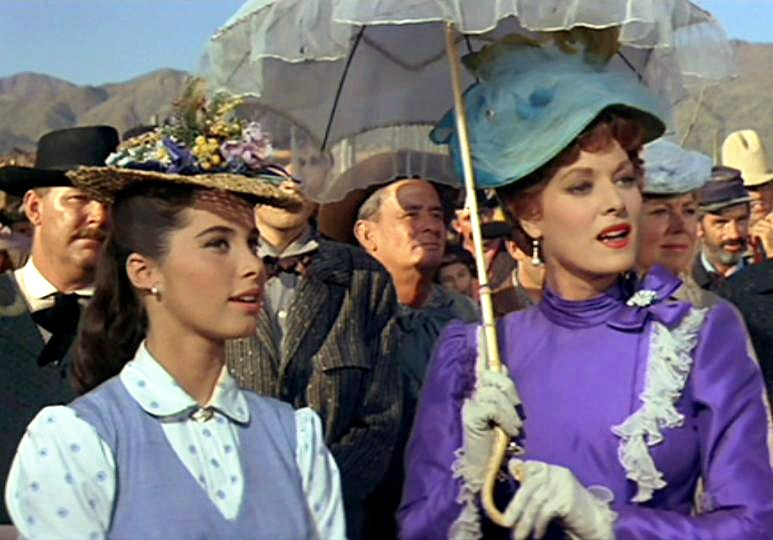
Powers (left) with Maureen O'Hara in McLintock!, 1963

Powers appeared in secondary roles in several movies in the early 1960s, such as Experiment in Terror (1962), If a Man Answers (1962), and McLintock! (1963). She played a schoolgirl in Tammy Tell Me True (1961), and Bunny, the police chief's daughter, in Palm Springs Weekend (1963). She appeared in the 1962 hospital melodrama The Interns and its sequel The New Interns in 1964. In 1965, she played opposite Tallulah Bankhead in Die! Die! My Darling (originally released in the UK as Fanatic).

Powers with Noel Harrison in The Girl from U.N.C.L.E.

In 1966, her "tempestuous" good looks led to being cast in the starring role as the passive and demure April Dancer, in the short-lived television series The Girl from U.N.C.L.E., a spin-off of The Man from U.N.C.L.E. Shortly after the series' debut, she was featured on the cover of TV Guide (December 31, 1966 – January 6, 1967). The article mentions her "117-pound frame is kept supple with 11 minutes of Royal Canadian Air Force exercises every morning... Unlike her fellow U.N.C.L.E. agents, the ladylike April is not required to kill the bad guys. Her feminine charms serve as the bait, while her partner Noel Harrison provides the fireworks." The series lasted for only one season (29 one-hour episodes), airing from September 16, 1966, to April 11, 1967.

In 1967, Powers appeared in Warning Shot with David Janssen. Her 1970s movies include The Boatniks (1970), Herbie Rides Again (a sequel to The Love Bug) and The Magnificent Seven Ride! (1972). She was a guest star in the Robert Wagner series It Takes a Thief in 1970. The two co-starred in the popular Hart to Hart series nine years later. Before success with Hart to Hart, she starred in The Feather and Father Gang as Toni "Feather" Danton, a successful lawyer, whose father, Harry Danton, was a smooth-talking ex-con man (played by Harold Gould). It ran for a half-season (13 episodes).

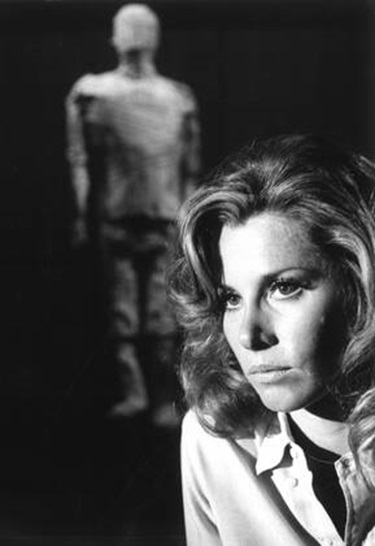
Powers in Paper Man (1971)

Powers' many guest roles in other popular TV shows include Lancer (1969), McCloud (1971), The Mod Squad (1972), Banacek (1972), Kung Fu (1974), The Rockford Files (1975), Three for the Road (1975), The Six Million Dollar Man (1976), The Bionic Woman (1976), and McMillan & Wife (1977). Powers appeared in these shows long after she signed a contract with Universal Studios in 1970. Coincidentally, her longtime friend and Hart to Hart series co-star Wagner signed a contract with Universal, but did not guest-star in more shows than Powers did.

In 1977, Powers played Sally Whalen in the six-part television miniseries Washington: Behind Closed Doors, produced by Paramount Television. It is based on John Ehrlichman's book The Company, a novel inspired by the author's time with the Nixon administration. The series also starred Cliff Robertson, Jason Robards, Robert Vaughn, Lois Nettleton, and John Houseman.

In 1978, Powers starred with Paul Clemens and Brian Dennehy in the TV movie A Death in Canaan, directed by Tony Richardson. This TV movie was a dramatization of the nonfictional account of Connecticut townspeople rising to the defense of a local teenager charged with the mutilation murder of his mother in September 1973. Powers portrayed Joan Barthel, a freelance‐writer who brought attention to the original case. Clemens, son of actress Eleanor Parker, made his film acting debut here. The TV movie also marked the American TV directing debut of Richardson, and was Emmy Award-nominated as Outstanding Special of the 1977–78 season.

In 1978, Powers and Stacy Keach were the leads in the stage play Cyrano de Bergerac in a season at the Central Theater in the Long Beach Convention and Entertainment Center. Directed by Rae Allen, the production was part of an eight-month Long Beach Theater Festival program. The stage production was intended to transfer to Broadway after its California season; however, the bi-coastal run was not extended due to the 1978 New York City newspaper strike of 88 days, which hindered all theatre advertising and reduced box-office sales of the new fall season.

In 1979, Powers starred with Roger Moore, David Niven, Telly Savalas, Claudia Cardinale, and Elliott Gould, in the feature film Escape to Athena, in which a group of Anglo-American prisoners of the Germans scramble to liberate themselves and some Greek art treasures, shot on location in the Dodecanese islands of Greece in 1978. This was Powers’ last theatrical film until The Artist's Wife in 2019, in which she played performance artist Ada Risi.

Powers became most widely known as a television star for her role as Jennifer Hart in the American mystery series Hart to Hart, opposite Robert Wagner as Jonathan Hart, in which they portray a married couple who continually get mixed up in mysterious and/or criminal occurrences that they then solve together, usually without the assistance of the police. Hart to Hart aired for five seasons from 1979 to 1984. Powers and Wagner later reunited for eight Hart to Hart TV movies in the 1990s.

In 1984, she starred in the TV mini-series Mistral's Daughter, based on Judith Krantz's novel.

In 1985, Powers starred as twins who swap places leading to dire consequences in the two-part TV movie Deceptions.

In 1987, she starred in the real-life TV drama At Mother's Request as the frightening Frances Schreuder, who goaded her 17-year-old-son into killing her father. The script was adapted for television by Richard DeLong Adams and aired on CBS, directed by Michael Tuchner.

Powers starred with John Barrowman in Matador, a 1991 London stage musical, at the Queen's Theater. with a book inspired by Spanish corrida legend El Cordobés. The production was staged by Elijah Moshinsky for producer Laurence Myers, with choreography by Arlene Phillips and Rafael Aguilar, and scenery by William Dudley.

Powers starred with Robert Wagner in the 1993 stage production Love Letters at the Chicago Theatre. The two portrayed Melissa Gardner and Andrew Makepeace Ladd III, telling the story of their 40-year, mostly long-distance relationship without getting up from their chairs.

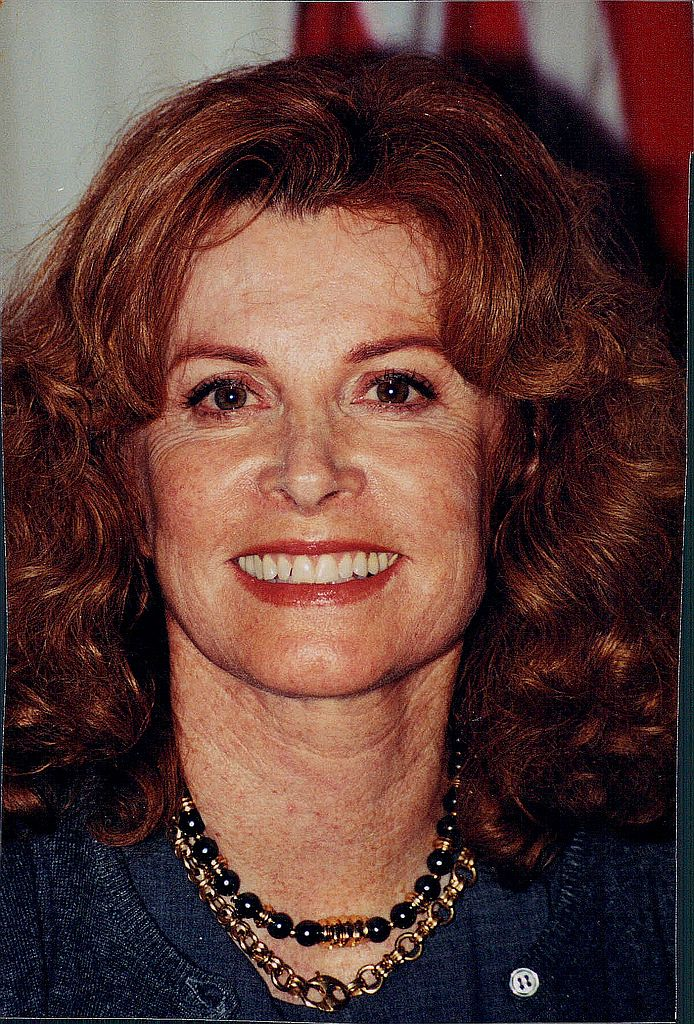
Powers in 1998

In 1996, Powers toured as Margo Channing in a production of Applause, with hopes of a Broadway revival, which did not materialize.

Powers toured the UK in 2002 playing Anna Leonowens in a revival of The King and I, and toured the U.S. in 2004 and 2005 in the same role.

Powers released her debut music CD in 2003, titled On The Same Page. The album features selections from the classic Great American Songbook era.

In 2001, she appeared in the BBC's popular long-running British medical drama Doctors as Jane Powers, a wealthy businesswoman, and the mother of Dr. Caroline Powers (Jacqueline Leonard). Jane Powers, after being widowed, was due to marry her much younger fiancé David Wilde, but in the lead-up to the wedding, her daughter and fiancé David fell in love and ran off together. Her last appearance was on June 1, 2001.

Since 2006, she has been the U.S. location guest-host presenter of the long-running Through the Keyhole panel show.

On April 30, 2008, she was reunited with Wagner for the filming of a special Hart to Hart edition of the BBC's The Graham Norton Show.

Powers was a contestant in the reality TV show 11th series of I'm a Celebrity...Get Me Out of Here!, in which celebrities retreat into the jungle. She was the first celebrity to be eliminated on November 25, 2011.

Powers started a tour of Looped, a stage play about her former co-star Tallulah Bankhead in Fort Lauderdale, Florida on February 26, 2013.

Powers starred in the musical Gotta Dance, which premiered in Chicago in December 2015 through January 2016. The show also starred Georgia Engel, Lillias White, and Andre DeShields. The musical was directed and choreographed by Jerry Mitchell, with a book by Chad Beguelin and Bob Martin, and the score by Matthew Sklar and Nell Benjamin.

In November 2017, it was announced that Powers had joined the cast for a developmental reading of Love Affair, a musical with book, music and lyrics by Joseph J. Simeone, based on the 1939 film of the same name. The developmental reading of the musical is being produced by Open Jar Productions as part of their New Works Initiative on November 17, 2017, for an industry-only presentation at the Pershing Square Signature Center.

In 2018, Powers co-starred in the feature film The Artist's Wife alongside lead actors Bruce Dern and Lena Olin. The film's plot centers on Claire (Olin), wife of famed artist Richard Smythson (Dern) and once a promising artist herself, who has been living in the shadow of her husband's illustrious career. Whilst preparing work for a new exhibition after a long absence from the art world, Richard is diagnosed with Alzheimer's. Directed by Tom Dolby, the film was released by Strand Releasing in 2020.

In May 2018, Cambridge Arts Theatre announced the casting for the United Kingdom stage tour production of James Roose-Evans' adaptation of Helene Hanff's novel 84 Charing Cross Road, in collaboration with Lee Dean and Salisbury Playhouse. 84 Charing Cross Road, first published in 1970, is a bittersweet comedy based on the extraordinary true story of the remarkable relationship that developed over 20 years, chronicling New York writer Hanff's correspondence with Frank Doel, the chief buyer for Marks & Co, a London bookshop. In the stage production, Powers portrays Helene Hanff, and Clive Francis portrays Frank Doel. The production opened at Darlington Hippodrome on Wednesday 23 May, then toured to Wolverhampton, Malvern, Richmond, Oxford and finishing at Cambridge Arts Theatre on 30 June 2018.

== Honors ==
For her role as Jennifer Hart, Powers received two Emmy Best Television Actress nominations, and five Golden Globe Award Best Television Actress nominations.

In 1992, Powers was a recipient of a Star on the Hollywood Walk of Fame at 6776 Hollywood Boulevard, category 'Television', presented by the Hollywood Chamber of Commerce.

Powers was awarded the Sarah Siddons Award in 1993 for her stage performance in Love Letters.

On March 12, 2011, Powers received the Steiger Award (Germany) for accomplishment in the arts.

On November 6, 2017, Powers was honored by the Palm Springs Women in Film & Television Organisation (PSWIFT) with the "9th Annual Broken Glass Award" for her work as an actress, author and animal advocate. PSWIFT presents this award to outstanding women from the film and television industry who have "broken through the glass ceiling" in the field of entertainment, the arts and philanthropy. Other 2017 Award recipients included actress Lucie Arnaz, President of LA-SAG-AFTRA Jane Austin, TV executive producer, writer and actress Kellee McQuinn, and Palm Springs, California community philanthropist Nelda Linsk. PSWIFT is a non-profit organization founded in 2001, dedicated to promoting both men and women in the entertainment, new media and creative arts community.

== Personal life ==
Powers was married to actor Gary Lockwood from 1966 to 1972. She had a relationship with actor William Holden from just after her divorce to just before his death that led to their joint involvement with wildlife conservation. She described the relationship by saying they were soul-mates. He died in 1981; by the following year, Powers was founding President of the William Holden Wildlife Foundation and a director of the Mount Kenya Game Ranch and Wildlife Conservancy in Nanyuki, Kenya. In the United States, she works with both the Cincinnati Zoo and Atlanta Zoo. She devotes a great deal of time to the cause and is an international guest speaker on wildlife preservation.

Powers campaigned for Robert F. Kennedy during his 1968 presidential campaign.

On April 1, 1993, she married French aristocrat Patrick Houitte de La Chesnais (born May 7, 1951, Versailles, France); the couple divorced in 1999. The following year, Powers began a relationship with auditor Tom Carroll, which lasted until his death in August 2014.

A polo player, she was among the first foreign members of the Royal County of Berkshire Polo Club, whose membership includes King Charles III. In 2005, she competed in the Joules United Kingdom National Women's Championships at Ascot.

=== Health ===
In November 2008, Powers, who was a smoker for 20 years, was diagnosed with alveolar cell carcinoma, a form of lung cancer. She had surgery to remove part of her right lung on January 29, 2009, the same month her mother died of pneumonia, aged 96, in Los Angeles.

== Filmography ==
=== Film ===
Year	Title	Role	Notes
1961	Tammy Tell Me True	Kay	
1962	If a Man Answers	Tina	
1962	Experiment in Terror	Toby Sherwood	
1962	The Interns	Gloria Mead	
1963	Palm Springs Weekend	Bunny Dixon	
1963	McLintock!	Becky McLintock	
1964	The New Interns	Gloria Worship	
1965	The Young Sinner	Ginny Miller	
1965	Love Has Many Faces	Carol Lambert	
1965	Die! Die! My Darling!	Pat Carroll	a.k.a. Fanatic
1966	Stagecoach	Mrs. Mallory	
1967	Warning Shot	Liz Thayer	
1969	Crescendo	Susan Roberts	
1970	The Boatniks	Kate Fairchild	
1972	The Magnificent Seven Ride!	Laurie Gunn	a.k.a. The Magnificent Seven 4
1974	Herbie Rides Again	Nicole Harris	
1975	Gone with the West	Little Moon	a.k.a. Little Moon and Jud McGraw
1975	It Seemed Like a Good Idea at the Time	Georgia Price	
1976	Invisible Strangler	Candy Barrett	a.k.a. The Astral Factor or The Astral Fiend
1979	Escape to Athena	Dottie Del Mar	
2008	Jump!	Katherine Wilkins	
2020	The Artist's Wife	Ada Risi	

=== Television ===
Year	Title	Role	Notes
1958	Now Is Tomorrow		Unsold pilot
1961	Bat Masterson	Ann Elkins	Episode: "Dead Man's Claim" credited as "Taffy Paul"
1963	Bonanza	Calamity Jane	Episode: "Calamity Over the Comstock"
1963	Route 66	Julie Severn	Episode: "A Cage in Search of a Bird"
1966–1967	The Girl from U.N.C.L.E.	April Dancer	Main role (29 episodes)
1968	Journey to the Unknown	Jane Brown	Episode: "Jane Brown's Body"
1969	Love, American Style	Poppy	Episode: "Love and the Doorknob"
1971	McCloud	Model	Episode: "Top of the World, Ma!"
1971	Paper Man	Karen McMillan	TV movie
1971	Five Desperate Women	Gloria	ABC Movie of the Week
1971	Ellery Queen: Don't Look Behind You	Celeste Phillips	
1971	The F.B.I.	Connie	Episode: "The Buyer"
1971	Sweet, Sweet Rachel	Rachel Stanton	ABC Movie of the Week
1972	Cannon	Kelly Prentiss	Episode: "The Rip-off"
1972	Hardcase	Rozaline Rutherford	ABC Movie of the Week
1972	The Streets of San Francisco	Toni	Episode: "Tower Beyond Tragedy"
1972	The Mod Squad	Francie Drango	Episode: "The Connection"
1972	Banacek	Angie Ives	Episode- "Let's Hear it for a Living Legend"
1972	The Sixth Sense (American TV series)	Paula Norris, Jean Ames	two episodes
1972	No Place to Run	Bonnie Howard	ABC Movie of the Week
1973	McCloud	Samantha	Episode: "Butch Cassidy Rides Again"
1973	Barnaby Jones	Sharon Renford	Episode: "Echo of a Murder"
1974	Cannon	Kelly Prentiss	Episode: "Kelly's Song"
1974	Petrocelli	Pauline Hannigan	Episode: "Night Games"
1974	Shootout in a One-Dog Town	Letty Crandell	ABC Movie of the Week
1974	Petrocelli	Jean Carter/Ellen Carter	Episode: "Mirror, Mirror On The Wall"
1974	Harry O	Fay Conners	Episode: "Second Sight"
1974	Skyway to Death	Nancy Sorenson	ABC Movie of the Week
1974	The Rookies	Edie Falvey	Season 3 Episode 6 - "Judgement"
1975	The Rockford Files	Christine Dusseau	Episode: "The Real Easy Red Dog"
1976	The Six Million Dollar Man	Shalon	Episodes: "The Return of Bigfoot Part 1", "The Secret of Bigfoot Part 2"
1976	The Bionic Woman	Shalon	Episodes: "The Return of Bigfoot Part 1", "The Secret of Bigfoot Part 2"
1976	Return to Earth	Marianne	TV movie
1976–1977	The Feather and Father Gang	Toni "Feather" Danton	Main role (14 episodes)
1977	Washington: Behind Closed Doors	Sally Whalen	Miniseries
1977	McMillan & Wife	D.A. Stephanie Bryant	Episode: 'Affair of the Heart' (Series 6, episode 5)
1978	A Death in Canaan	Joan Barthel	TV movie
1979–1984	Hart to Hart	Jennifer Hart	Main role (111 episodes)
1984	Mistral's Daughter	Maggie Lunel	Miniseries
1984	Family Secrets	Jessie Calloway	TV movie
1985	Deceptions	Sabrina Longworth and Stephanie Roberts	Miniseries
1985	Hollywood Wives	Montana Gray	Miniseries
1987	At Mother's Request	Frances Schreuder	Miniseries
1988	Beryl Markham: A Shadow on the Sun	Beryl Markham	Miniseries
1993	Hart to Hart Returns	Jennifer Hart	TV movie
1994	Hart to Hart: Home Is Where the Hart Is	Jennifer Hart	TV movie
1994	Hart to Hart: Crimes of the Hart	Jennifer Hart	TV movie
1994	Hart to Hart: Old Friends Never Die	Jennifer Hart	TV movie
1995	Hart to Hart: Secrets of the Hart	Jennifer Hart	TV movie
1995	Hart to Hart: Two Harts in 3/4 Time	Jennifer Hart	TV movie
1996	Hart to Hart: Harts in High Season	Jennifer Hart	TV movie
1996	Hart to Hart: Till Death Do Us Hart	Jennifer Hart	TV movie
2000	Someone Is Watching	Michelle Dupre	TV movie
2001	Doctors	Jane Powers	Recurring role (7 episodes)
2010	A Soldier's Love Story	Louise Metcalf	TV movie
2013	Reading, Writing and Romance	Brenda	TV movie
2014	A Ring by Spring	Madam Rue	TV movie
2015	Love by the Book	Marilyn	TV movie
2026	The Rookie	Sabina Leonardi	Episode: “Aftermath”
