= Cambridge Circus, London =

Road junction in Central London

Coordinates: 51.513295°N 0.129164°W

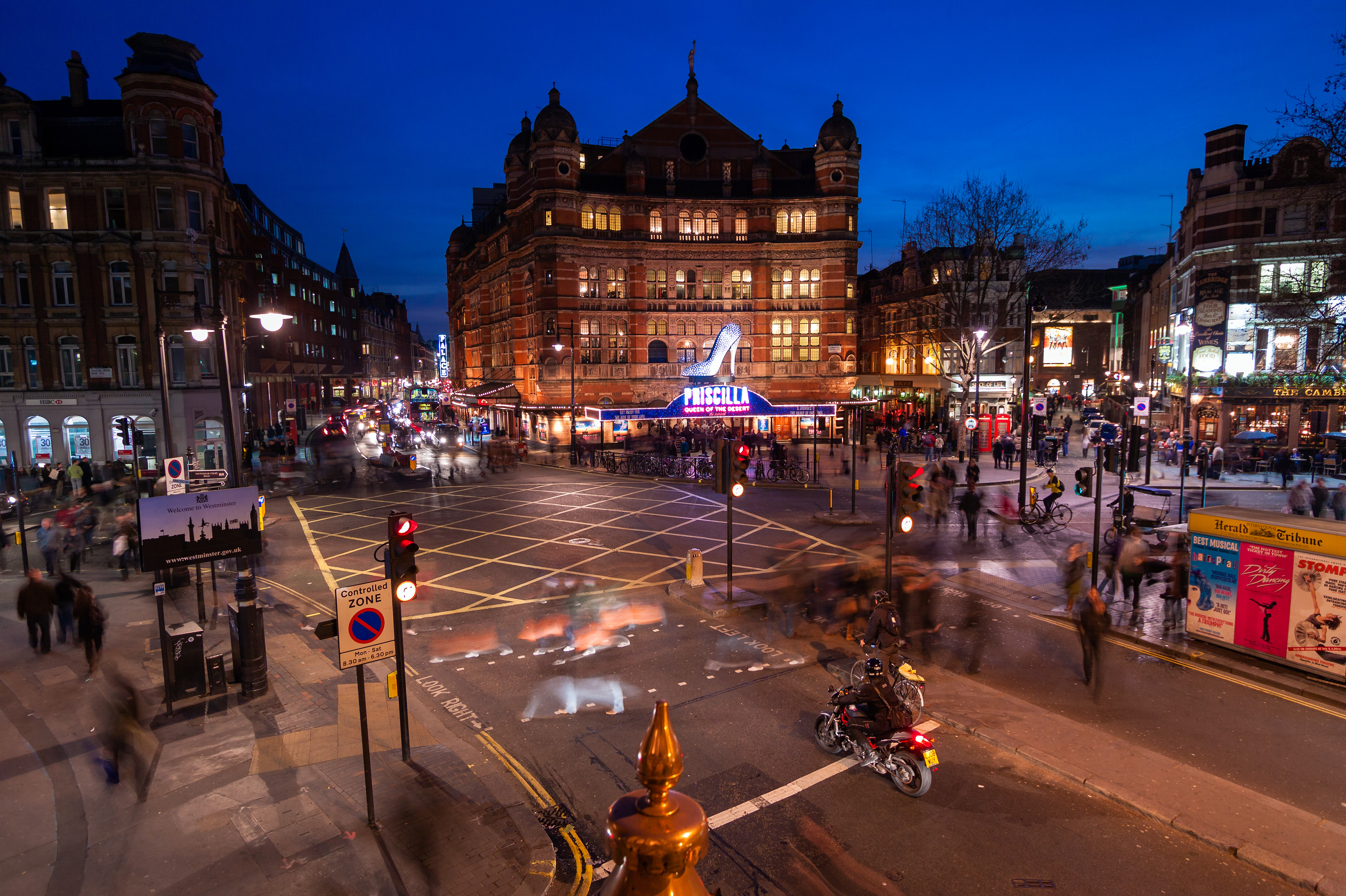
Cambridge Circus and the Palace Theatre

Cambridge Circus is the intersection where Shaftesbury Avenue crosses Charing Cross Road on the eastern edge of Soho, Central London. Side-streets Earlham, West, Romilly and Moor streets also converge at this point. It is halfway between Tottenham Court Road station, Oxford Street (at St Giles Circus) and the centre of Leicester Square, which is southwest of Charing Cross Road via Cranborne Street.

The Circus is fronted by listed Victorian buildings. Of these, the Palace Theatre has the widest façade; three bars and three fast food outlets occupy the ground floors of the others.

== History ==
The opening of Charing Cross railway station in 1864 highlighted the need for better road routes northward towards Oxford Street and Tottenham Court Road. The Metropolitan Board of Works therefore proposed two new streets using the powers granted by the recent Metropolitan Street Improvements Act 1877. The new roads, later named Charing Cross Road and Shaftesbury Avenue, were planned by the board's staff, the architect George Vulliamy and the engineer Sir Joseph Bazelgette. The plan required the demolition of the old Newport Market and the squalid slums that surrounded it; much delay was incurred by this as the residents were required by the act to be rehoused locally. The two new roads were to meet at a junction or "circus", which was named after Prince George, Duke of Cambridge, a cousin of Queen Victoria, who officially opened Charing Cross Road in 1887. Cambridge Circus was initially offered by the Board of Works as the location for the Shaftesbury Memorial Fountain or "Eros", but the memorial committee chose Piccadilly Circus at the other end of Shaftesbury Avenue instead.

== Side-street approaches ==
Earlham Street specialises in fashion. Moor Street, leading to the Prince Edward Theatre, has numerous cafés. West Street has St Martin's Theatre, restaurant The Ivy, and until 2019 L'Atelier de Joël Robuchon.

== Buildings ==
The Palace Theatre is on the west side of the junction; it was designed by T. E. Collcutt in the Northern Rennaisance style, and built in 1888-1891; originally called the Royal English Opera House. It is a Grade II* listed building. The Ivy restaurant and a number of private clubs are accessible from the south of Cambridge Circus. The Victorian buildings which surround the junction have featured in a number of espionage and spy films and books.

Gloucester Mansions (1892) by Martin & Purchase

Albany Mansion (1889) by Martin & Purchase

Palace Theatre (1891) by T. E. Collcutt

== In fiction ==
In his espionage novels, author John le Carré placed the headquarters of the fictionalised British intelligence service based on MI6 in buildings on Shaftesbury Avenue and Cambridge Circus; it is from this that Le Carré's nickname for the agency, "The Circus", derives. The BBC's Gordon Corera notes that the entrance described by Le Carré most closely resembles that of 90 Charing Cross Road, just north of Cambridge Circus. The actual MI6 has never occupied premises in or near Cambridge Circus.

The Circus hosted Marks & Co, booksellers, who operated from 84 Charing Cross Road, which featured in Helene Hanff's 1970 book 84, Charing Cross Road, which has subsequently been adapted into a stage play, a television play, and a 1987 movie starting Anne Bancroft, Anthony Hopkins, and Judi Dench. Hanff's book, as well as her other work The Duchess of Bloomsbury (1973), detail her several-decades-long correspondence by mail with Frank Doel, a bookseller at Marks & Co.

In the 2008 film Slumdog Millionaire, the protagonist, Jamal, is asked to locate Cambridge Circus in the Indian version of the game show Who Wants to Be a Millionaire?. He answers the 5 million rupee question correctly, based on his experience working in an outsourced call centre.

=== Film locations ===
Cambridge Circus has featured in:

- The League of Gentlemen (1960)
- Tinker Tailor Soldier Spy (1979)
- 84 Charing Cross Road (1987)
- Match Point (2005)
