= The Adventures of Ellery Queen =

American television detective series

Lee Bowman and Florenz Ames in an episode of the DuMont/ABC run

The Adventures of Ellery Queen is the title of two separate television series made in the 1950s. They are based on the fictional detective Ellery Queen and the cases he solves with his father Inspector Richard Queen.

== The Adventures of Ellery Queen (DuMont and ABC) ==
The first series was telecast on DuMont Television Network from October 19, 1950, to December 6, 1951 (50 episodes), and ABC from December 16, 1951, to November 26, 1952 (43 episodes). It initially starred Richard Hart as Ellery Queen but he suddenly died of a heart attack in January 1951 and was replaced by Lee Bowman. Florenz Ames played Inspector Richard Queen. This was the first production by Irving and Norman Pincus. Donald Richardson was the director. Guest stars included Anne Bancroft, John Carradine, and Eva Gabor. Some of the scripts were written by Helene Hanff, who would go on to write the famous 1970 book 84, Charing Cross Road. Bancroft would go on to play Hanff in the film adaptation of 84, Charing Cross Road in 1987.

The ABC version was sponsored by Bayuk cigars, but that sponsorship ended with the last broadcast. It was broadcast on Wednesdays 9-9:30 p.m. Eastern Time.

=== Episodes ===
==== First Season - DuMont Network ====
1. The Bad Boy
2. The Mad Tea Party
3. The Invisible Lover
4. The Long Count
5. The Three Lame Men
6. The Human Weapon
7. The Crooked Man
8. The Adventure of the Blind Bullet
9. Two Pieces of Silver
10. The Hanging Acrobat
11. The Star of India
12. The Adventures of the Survivors' Club
13. Prescription For Treason
14. The House of Terror
15. Murder in Hollywood
16. The Adventure of the Man who Killed Cops
17. The Hanging Patient
18. The Adventure of the Jewel-Handled Knife
19. The Case of the Falling Corpse
20. The Adventure of the Strange Voyage
21. The Madcap Robbery
22. The Adventure of the Manhunt
23. Murder at the Museum
24. The Adventures of the Man who Enjoyed Death
25. The Case of the Frightened Lady
26. The Baseball Murder Case
27. Murder for Twelve Cents
28. The Key to Murder
29. Death Spins a Wheel
30. Dissolve to Death
31. The Frame-Up
32. The Happiness Club
33. The Chinese Mummer Mystery
34. Murder in the Zoo
35. Death in a Capsule
36. The Case of the Upright Man
37. The Adventure of the Frightened Child
38. The Adventure of the Ballet Murder

==== Second Season - DuMont Network ====
1. The Adventure of the Twilight Zone
2. The Dead Man who Walked
3. Murder in the Death House
4. The Garden of Death
5. The Gridiron Murder
6. The Coffee House Murder
7. Death in a Ghost Town
8. Murder to Music
9. The Inside Man
10. Pavanne for a Dead Princess
11. The Adventure of the Shape-Up
12. Death at the Opera

==== ABC Network ====
1. Ticket to Nowhere
2. A Christmas Story
3. The Long Shot
4. The Unhung Jury
5. Death In the Sorority House
6. The Feminine Touch
7. Dance of Death
8. One Week to Live
9. Mr. Big
10. Left-Cross
11. The Red Hook Murder
12. King Size Death
13. The File of Death
14. The Bar Peaceful Murder
15. Doodle of Death
16. The Men Without Faces
17. Death of a Wax Doll
18. Cat and Mouse
19. Coroner's Inquest
20. The Not So Private Eye
21. Rehearsal for Murder
22. Prize Catch
23. The Case of the Heartbroken Men
24. The Third Room
25. The Pool of Death
26. Dead Secret
27. Case of the Canvas Shroud
28. A Frame for a Chair
29. The Winner was Death
30. Confidential Agent
31. The Ten Dollar Bill
32. The Case of the Wise Man
33. Ready For Hanging
34. Legacy of Death
35. Buck Fever
36. Custom Made
37. The Case of the Two-Faced Man
38. A Touch of Death
39. A Close-Up of Murder
40. The Destructive Angel
41. The High Executioner
42. Companion to a Killer
43. Double Exposure

== The Further Adventures of Ellery Queen (NBC) ==
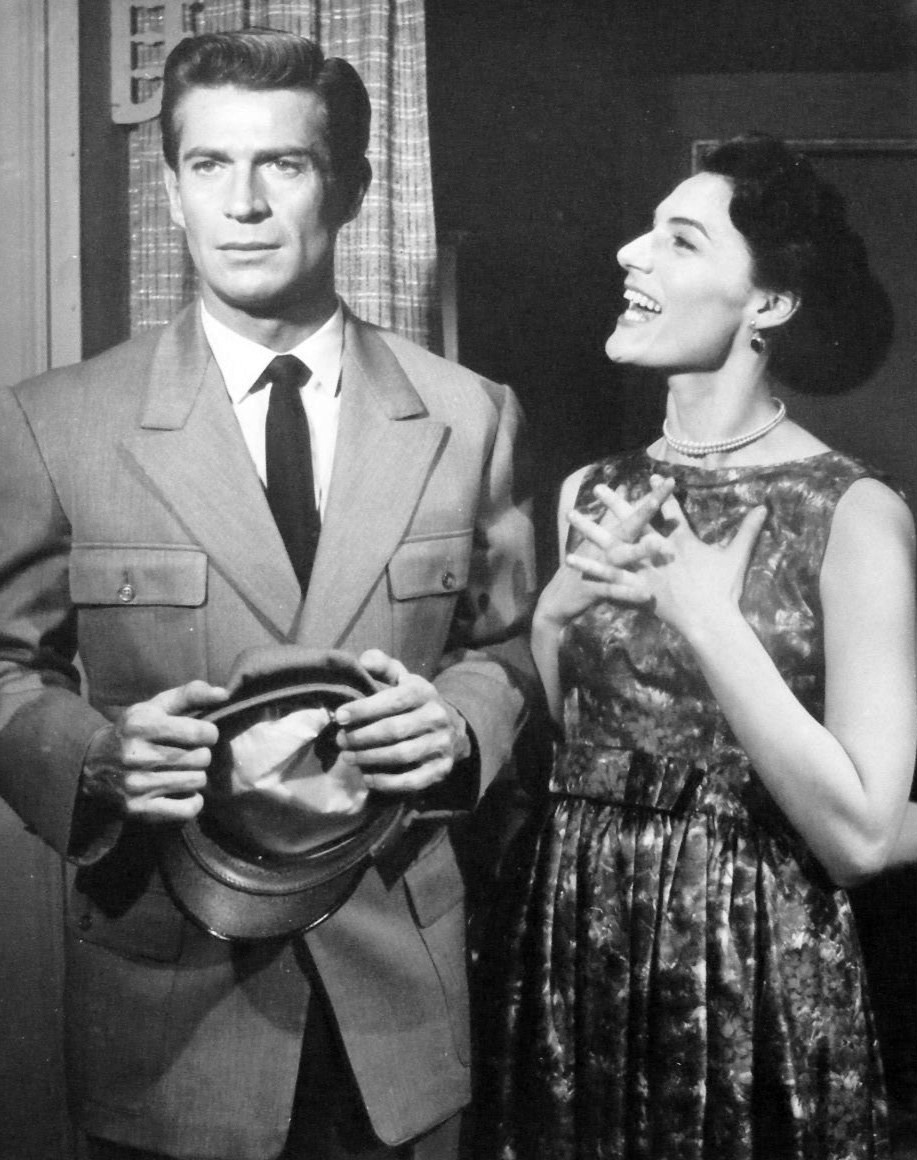
George Nader and Marian Seldes in a 1959 episode.

Lee Philips in a 1959 episode.

The second series was telecast on NBC from September 26, 1958, to June 5, 1959, (33 episodes). It featured George Nader as Ellery Queen for the first twenty episodes and Lee Philips for the remaining thirteen. Les Tremayne took the role of Inspector Richard Queen. It was produced by Albert McCleery. Film star and Oscar-nominee Nancy Carroll made a guest appearance.

=== Episodes ===
1. The Glass Village
2. The King is Dead
3. Ten Days of Wonder
4. The Door Between
5. The 8th Mrs Bluebeard
6. Cat of Many Tails
7. Death Before Bedtime
8. Double, Double
9. So Rich, So Lovely, So Dead
10. Diamond-studded Typewriter
11. Four and Twenty to Live
12. Paint the Town Black
13. The Hollow Man
14. Bury Me Deep
15. The Hinnolity Story
16. The Jinn City Story
17. Revolution
18. The Murder of Whistler's Brother
19. Death likes it Hot
20. Margin of Terror
21. Chauffeur Disguise
22. Shadow of the Past
23. The Chemistry Set
24. Cartel for Murder
25. A Girl Named Daisy
26. The Paper Tigers
27. The Lecture
28. Confession of Murder
29. Castaway on a Nearby Island
30. The Curse of Aden
31. Dance into Death
32. Body of the Crime
33. This Murder Comes to you Live

== See also ==
- List of programs broadcast by the DuMont Television Network
- List of surviving DuMont Television Network broadcasts
