= James Roose-Evans =

British theatre director and writer (1927–2022)

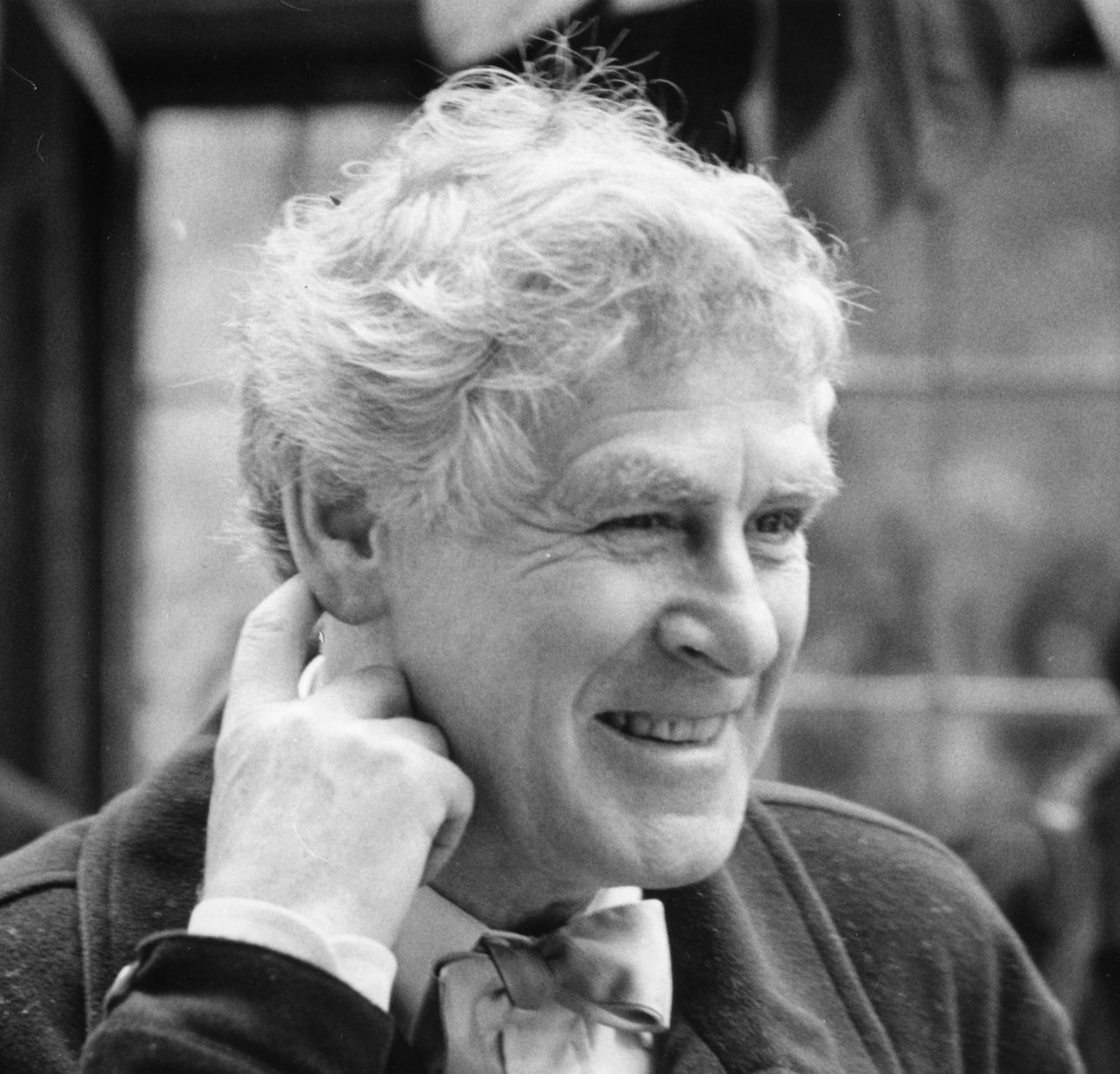
James Roose-Evans

James Roose-Evans (11 November 1927 – 26 October 2022) was a British theatre director, priest, and writer on experimental theatre, ritual and meditation. In 1959 he founded the Hampstead Theatre Club, in London; in 1974 the Bleddfa Centre for the Creative Spirit, in mid-Wales; and in 2015 Frontier Theatre Productions. He was best known for directing the West End play 84 Charing Cross Road.

== Early life and education ==
James Roose-Evans was born in London on 11 November 1927, the second son of Jack and Primrose. His older brother Monty later emigrated to America. Roose-Evans attended the Crypt Grammar School, Gloucester, before spending eighteen months in the Royal Army Educational Corps, ending his service in Trieste in 1947.

In 1949, he was admitted to St Benet's Hall, Oxford where he read English. In the vacations, and after graduating from university, he worked as an actor in repertory theatres. In 1954, at Bridgwater, Somerset, where he was leading man, he was encouraged to direct by Kenneth Williams.

== Career as a theatre director ==
In 1954, Roose-Evans was appointed Artistic Director of the Maddermarket Theatre in Norwich. Here, in the 1954–55 season he directed nine plays including Shakespeare's Macbeth (in which he also played the lead), and Garcia Lorca's Dona Rosita, for which he visited Granada and met the eponymous heroine.

Having met Martha Graham and seen her dance company on its first visit to England, Roose-Evans determined to go to America to learn more about modern dance. He was appointed to the Faculty of the Juilliard School of Music in New York City where he was given a studio, a group of dancers, musicians and a composer, and invited to experiment with integrating music, dance and drama, which he did from 1955–56.

=== RADA ===
On his return to the UK, Roose-Evans joined the staff of the Royal Academy of Dramatic Art, directing many productions in the Vanbrugh Theatre, from his own adaptation of Milton's Paradise Lost, to Henri de Montherlant's Port Royal. His production of Dylan Thomas's Under Milk Wood was revived term after term, with different casts, eventually transferring to the Lyric Theatre, Hammersmith, with Philip Madoc in the lead role.

Among the RADA students Roose-Evans taught were Mike Leigh, Sarah Miles, John Hurt, Geoffrey Whitehead, and Michael Williams. He also taught at the Central School of Speech and Drama, where he influenced students including Vanessa Redgrave and Judi Dench.

=== Hampstead Theatre ===
In 1959 Roose-Evans founded the Hampstead Theatre Club, at Moreland Hall, in Holly Bush Vale, London. The first season opened with Siwan, a play by the Welsh poet Saunders Lewis, translated by Emyr Humphreys, and with Siân Phillips as the Princess Siwan. A double-bill by Harold Pinter, The Dumb Waiter and The Room, received rave reviews from Harold Hobson in The Sunday Times, and put the fledgling theatre on the cultural map.

Roose-Evans remained at the Hampstead Theatre until 1971, during which time his production of Noël Coward's Private Lives transferred to the West End, followed by his adaptation and production of Laurie Lee's Cider with Rosie – at one point Hampstead had two productions running simultaneously in the West End. In that time he also founded the short-lived Stage Two, an adjunct to the Hampstead Theatre conceived as a laboratory for experimental theatre.

=== Career from 1971 ===
In the following years, Roose-Evans directed a number of commercial productions (including Private Lives with Joanna Lumley and Simon Cadell), an experimental production of Oedipus for the Contemporary Greek Theatre in Athens; as well as his 1973 production of the Chester Mystery Plays which he rehearsed over a period of nine months.

=== 84 Charing Cross Road ===
In the summer of 1980, Roose-Evans went to teach a practical course in Experimental Theatre in Grand Rapids, Michigan. His assistant there, Susan Kruger, gave him a copy of Helene Hanff's 84, Charing Cross Road, which he then adapted for the stage. He directed the world premiere at the Salisbury Playhouse in the summer of 1981. It transferred to the West End, winning awards for Rosemary Leach as Best Actress and for Roose-Evans as Best Director. In 1982 he directed an American cast in the play on Broadway, with Ellen Burstyn and Joe Maher in the leading roles, where it won further awards for Best Actress, Best Actor, Best Director and Best Play. James subsequently directed tours of 84, the first with Miriam Karlin as Helene, and then Rula Lenska. In February 2015 his new production of 84 Charing Cross Road opened at Salisbury with Janie Dee as Helene and Clive Francis as Frank Doel.

=== Frontier Theatre Productions ===
Roose-Evans was involved in Frontier Theatre Productions, a new theatre company, which provides a platform for actors aged over 60.

== Ritual ==
Roose-Evans had a special interest in ritual, and in the development of rituals for particular situations. His book, Passages of the Soul: Ritual Today, describes his work in this area, and the exercises he has evolved.

== Meditation and spirituality ==
In the early 1960s, Roose-Evans presented a series of Epilogues for BBC television on the subject of prayer. He also wrote a weekly column on meditation for the Church Times.

Roose-Evans was brought up an Anglican, but was received into the Roman Catholic Church while in Trieste on army service. He later reverted to Anglicanism and in 1981 he was ordained in Hereford Cathedral as a non-stipendiary priest of the Church of England.

Roose-Evans practised meditation for more than fifty years. In his first book on the subject, Inner Journey: Outer Journey, Finding a spiritual centre in everyday life, he wrote, "The little that I know about prayer has been forged in the fire of practice, against a backdrop of uncertainty, stress, and a lack of security, in a restless and hustling profession. I am not an authority on prayer, if indeed such a thing is possible; but it may be an encouragement to others to know that in such a gypsy existence an inner centre can be found and held." His most recent book on meditation is Finding Silence: 52 Meditations for Daily Living. He maintained a blog, entitled The Sound of Silence.

In 2020 James was invited to Lambeth Palace to receive the Dunstan Award for prayer and the religious life "for his distinctive contribution in exploring over 65 years the relationship between art and life, the creative and spiritual".

== The Bleddfa Centre for the Creative Spirit ==
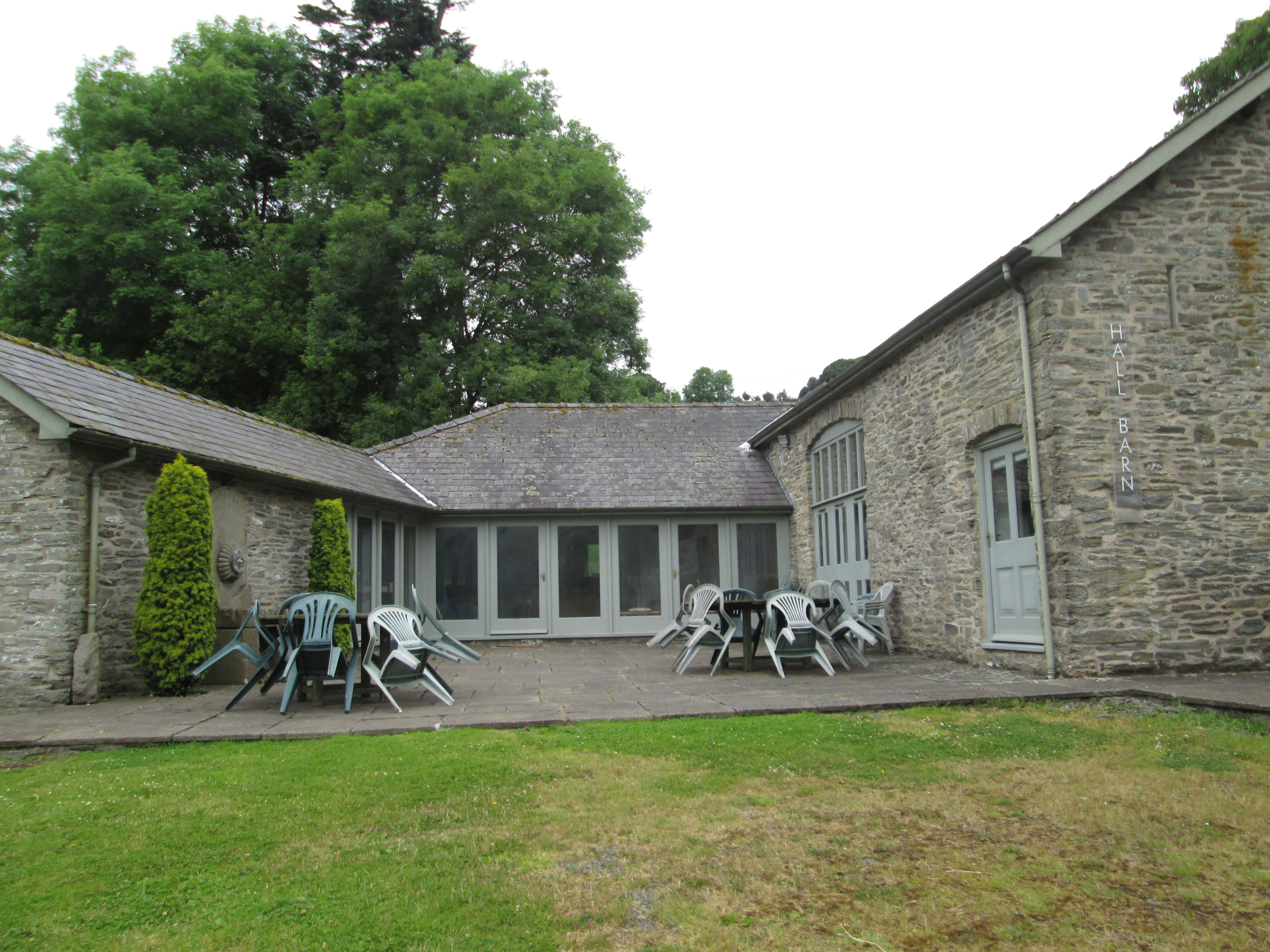
Hall Barn at the Bleddfa Centre

The Bleddfa Centre, in Powys, was founded in 1974 by Roose-Evans and his partner Hywel Jones. The Bleddfa Centre hosts seminars, workshops and retreats, and aims to encourage the exploration of the relationship between art and life, and between the creative and the spiritual.

== Journalism ==
Roose-Evans contributed articles and reviews to many journals and publications. He was a regular contributor to the BBC's programme Kaleidescope, and Woman's Hour, and for two years contributed a weekly column for Woman magazine, under the heading Something Extra.

== Publications ==
Roose-Evans was the author of twenty-one books, including: Directing A Play, with an introduction by Vanessa Redgrave; Experimental Theatre; London Theatre: from the Globe to the National; One Foot on the Stage (the biography of the actor Richard Wilson); Inner Journey: Outer Journey; Passages of the Soul: Ritual Today; Opening Doors and Windows: A Memoir in Four Acts; and Finding Silence: 52 Meditations for Daily Living.

Roose-Evans also edited the letters of Joyce Grenfell to her mother, Darling Ma, as well as her wartime journals, The Time of My Life. In addition he wrote for Maureen Lipman an entertainment about life of Joyce Grenfell entitled Re:Joyce! and directed the first performances. It later played two sell-out seasons in the West End.

Roose-Evans' papers are lodged at the Harry Ransom Center, the University of Texas at Austin.

== Personal life and death ==
Roose-Evans had two major relationships in his life: the first was with the actor David March whom he met as a student in Oxford and with whom he lived until 1960. In 1958 he met the actor Hywel Jones, who would be his partner for the next 54 years. Jones died in 2013, and Roose-Evans wrote a memoir of their life together.

Roose-Evans died on 26 October 2022, at the age of 94.

== Books ==
Roose-Evans is the author of

- Directing a Play (1968)
- Experimental Theatre from Stanislavsky to Peter Brook (1970)
- London Theatre: From the Globe to the National (1977) ISBN 978-0-7148-1766-8
- Inner Journey: Outer Journey (1987) (reprinted 2019 with a new foreword by Rowan Williams)
- The Cook-a-Story Book
- Passages of the Soul: Ritual Today (1995)
- The Inner Stage: Finding a Centre in Prayer and Ritual (1995) ISBN 978-1-56101-001-1
- One Foot on the Stage: The Biography of Richard Wilson (1996)
- Cook-a-Story: The Bleddfa Cook Book (2005)
- Opening Doors and Windows A Memoir In Four Acts (2009)
- Finding Silence 52 meditations for Daily Living (2009)
- Blue Remembered Hills: A Radnorshire Journey (2017) ISBN 978-1-9998-3799-0
- A Life Shared, Port Meadow Press, [2018], ISBN 978-1-9998379-5-2
- Older: A Thought Diary (2019)
- Behold the Word: 52 Visual Meditations (2020) (with John Rowlands-Pritchard)

and a number of children's books, including

- The Adventures of Odd and Elsewhere (1971)
- The Secret Of The Seven Bright Shiners (1972)
- Elsewhere and the Gathering of the Clowns (1974)
- Odd and the Great Bear (1974)
- The Return Of The Great Bear (1975 May) ISBN 978-0-233-96647-2
- Odd to the Rescue! (1975)
- The Secret Of Tippity Witchit (1975 October)
- The Lost Treasure of Wales (1977)
- The Christ Mouse

The Odd and Elsewhere series was illustrated by Brian Robb.
