= Natalie Ogle =

British actress (born 1958)

Natalie Ogle (born 1958) is an English actress.

Natalie Ogle was plucked out of drama school at 17 to appear in Tony Richardson's film Joseph Andrews, for which she was nominated Most Promising Newcomer for The Evening Standard British Film Awards 1977. She worked extensively in television and theatre during the 1980s and 1990s and is still active in the industry. In the 1980s Natalie played Letty Mundy in the successful TV series We'll Meet Again, as well as appearing in numerous televised costume dramas for the BBC such as Little Nell in The Old Curiosity Shop; Lydia Bennet in Pride and Prejudice; Camille; Silas Marner; David Copperfield; Time and the Conway's; The Aerodrome; All or Nothing at All; A Touch of Spice; Poirot; The Miser; The Master Builder; and Cecily Cardew in The Importance of Being Earnest, a part she re-created in 1987 in London's West End.

For the past twenty-five years Natalie Ogle has also worked as a drama and public speaking coach. She is married to the actor Clive Francis.

== Filmography ==
Year	Title	Role	Notes
1977	Joseph Andrews	Fanny	
1978	The Stud	Maddy	
1980	Pride and Prejudice	Lydia Bennet	
