= Hart to Hart =

American mystery television series (1979–1984)

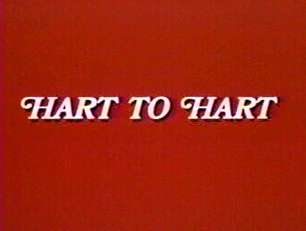
- Genre: Mystery; Romance; Detective fiction; Adventure; Action
- Created by: Sidney Sheldon
- Developed by: Tom Mankiewicz
- Creative director: Tom Mankiewicz (credited as "creative consultant")
- Starring: Robert Wagner; Stefanie Powers; Lionel Stander
- Theme music composer: Mark Snow
- Composer: Don Davis
- Country of origin: United States
- No. of seasons: 5
- No. of episodes: 111 (list of episodes)

Production
- Executive producers: Aaron Spelling; Leonard Goldberg
- Producers: David Levinson (1979–80); Mart Crowley (1980–83); Leigh Vance (1983–84)
- Running time: 47–48 minutes 96 minutes (pilot)
- Production companies: Rona II Productions; Spelling-Goldberg Productions; Columbia Pictures Television (seasons 4–5)

Original release
- Network: ABC
- Release: August 25, 1979 – May 22, 1984

Hart to Hart is an American mystery television series that premiered on August 25, 1979, on ABC. The show stars Robert Wagner and Stefanie Powers as Jonathan and Jennifer Hart, respectively, a wealthy couple who lead a glamorous jetset lifestyle and regularly find themselves working as unpaid detectives in order to solve crimes in which they become embroiled. The series was created by novelist and television writer Sidney Sheldon. The series ended after five seasons on May 22, 1984, but was followed by eight made-for-television movies, which ran from 1993 to 1996.

== Premise ==
The premise of the show is summed up in the opening credits sequence, narrated by Max, the Harts' majordomo (Lionel Stander), as he introduces the characters:

This is my boss — Jonathan Hart, a self-made millionaire. He's quite a guy.
This is Mrs. H — she's gorgeous. What a terrific lady.
By the way, my name is Max. I take care of them — which ain't easy; 'cause their hobby is — murder.

Several early first season episodes originally included a slightly differently worded intro, with some alternative accompanying shots. This is replaced with the standard first season opening in syndication and later digital releases:

This is my boss — Mr. Jonathan Hart, self-made millionaire and quite a guy.
This here's his wife, Mrs. H — yeah, she's gorgeous, but don't let her looks deceive you.
Oh, and me? My name is Max. I'm their chauffeur... among other things, and it's my job to try and take care of them — which ain't easy; 'cause when they meet... it's murder.

Beginning with Season 2 onward, the opening lines were slightly changed:

This is my boss — Jonathan Hart, a self-made millionaire. He's quite a guy.
This is Mrs. H — she's gorgeous. She's one lady who knows how to take care of herself.
By the way, my name is Max. I take care of both of them — which ain't easy; 'cause when they met, it was murder.

Jonathan Hart (Robert Wagner) is the CEO of Hart Industries, a global conglomerate based in Los Angeles. His wife Jennifer (Stefanie Powers) is a freelance journalist. Living the jetset lifestyle, the Harts often find themselves involved in cases of smuggling, theft, corporate and international espionage and, most commonly, murder. At their opulent Bel Air estate, they are assisted by Max (Lionel Stander), their shared mansion's loyal, gravel-voiced majordomo, who also helps with their cases. The Harts' beloved pet dog is a Löwchen called Freeway, so named because he was a stray that they found wandering on the freeway. The Harts own a Mercedes-Benz 300 TD diesel wagon, a dark green Rolls-Royce Corniche convertible (replacing the Series III Bentley custom cabriolet in the first season), and a yellow Mercedes-Benz SL roadster (1979 450 SL, replaced by a 1981 380 SL) with personalized California vanity plates "3 HARTS", "2 HARTS", and "1 HART" respectively. The opening credits sequence (stock footage drawn from the series pilot) shows Jonathan Hart driving a red Dino 246 GTS. They also own a Grumman Gulfstream II private jet, which is featured at the start of the opening credits.

Critics have long noted that the premise of Hart to Hart strongly resembles that of The Thin Man films of the 1930s and 1940s, as well as The Thin Man television series of the 1950s, which also depict a wealthy and glamorous crime-fighting couple who have a dog and no children.

== Production ==
Screenwriter and novelist Sidney Sheldon wrote a script in the early 1970s for CBS titled Double Twist, about a married couple who were spies. It remained unfilmed for several years until producers Aaron Spelling and Leonard Goldberg decided to update the idea for a potential television series. They offered the script to screenwriter Tom Mankiewicz, who had by that time written several screenplays, including three James Bond films.

They instructed Mankiewicz to make the script more contemporary for a weekly series. They proposed to Mankiewicz that if his draft was successful, he could direct the pilot episode. Mankiewicz reworked Sheldon's original script and renamed it Hart to Hart, emphasizing the romantic aspect of the couple. Mankiewicz made his directorial debut with the pilot episode, and remained a creative consultant to the series. The first ten episodes were developed by Mankiewicz with the series' original story editor, Bob Shayne.

Spelling's and Goldberg's initial choice for the role of Jonathan Hart was Cary Grant. However, Grant was 75 years old and retired from acting; his last film, Walk, Don't Run, was released in 1966. They then decided to find a younger actor who might embody the same style, zest and persona of Grant, and offered the role to Robert Wagner. No one else was seriously considered. George Hamilton was suggested, but Aaron Spelling said that if he was signed for the role, "the audience will resent him as Hart for being that rich. But no one will begrudge RJ [Wagner] a nickel."

ABC wanted Wagner's then-wife Natalie Wood to co-star as Jennifer Hart, but Wagner did not think it was a good idea. (Wood made a cameo appearance in the pilot, as an actress playing Scarlett O'Hara.) Initial choices for the role of Jennifer included Suzanne Pleshette, Kate Jackson (months removed from ending a three-year turn on Charlie's Angels), and Lindsay Wagner (no relation), but Robert Wagner suggested Stefanie Powers, with whom he had worked in an episode of his action-adventure series It Takes a Thief.

Wagner wanted Sugar Ray Robinson to portray Max, but ABC executives were worried about a black man as majordomo for a rich white couple. Eventually they signed Lionel Stander, who, like Powers, had worked with Wagner on It Takes a Thief. In that episode, "King of Thieves", Stander played a character named Max, who was likewise a lifelong friend. Stander was also cast as Max in Tom Mankiewicz's film The Cassandra Crossing in 1976, in which the lead characters, portrayed by Richard Harris and Sophia Loren, were also called Jonathan and Jennifer.

The main title theme for the series was scored by Mark Snow. Fashion and jewelry designer Nolan Miller, who later designed the clothes for Dynasty, was the costume designer for the show.

The ranch-style house used for exteriors previously belonged to Dick Powell and June Allyson. Powell was an old friend of Wagner and Spelling. The actual estate, Amber Hills, is situated on 48 acres (19 ha) in the Mandeville Canyon section of Brentwood, Los Angeles. In the series, the Harts' address is given as 3100 Willow Pond Road, Bel Air: the real address is 3100 Mandeville Canyon Road. One episode was shot in San Diego.

As with most of the Spelling library under the control of Sony Pictures Television, the series has been remastered from the originals for widescreen high definition presentation.

== Episodes ==
Season	Episodes	Originally released		Rank	Rating
Season	Episodes	First released	Last released	Rank	Rating
Pilot		August 25, 1979		—N/a	—N/a
1	22	September 22, 1979	May 13, 1980	—N/a	—N/a
2	20	November 11, 1980	May 26, 1981	23	19.9
3	24	October 6, 1981	May 18, 1982	15	21.1 (Note: Tied with Trapper John, M.D.)
4	22	September 28, 1982	May 10, 1983	17	18.9
5	22	September 27, 1983	May 22, 1984	46	15.6
TV movies		November 5, 1993	August 25, 1996	—N/a	—N/a

== TV movies ==
In 1993, nine years after the series ended, Wagner and Powers reunited for a series of Hart to Hart TV movies. Eight 90-minute telemovies were made in total over the next four years; the first five for NBC, and the final three for CTV Television Network:

- Hart to Hart Returns (November 5, 1993)
- Home is Where the Hart Is (February 18, 1994)
- Crimes of the Hart (March 25, 1994)
- Old Friends Never Die (May 6, 1994)
- Secrets of the Hart (March 6, 1995)
- Two Harts in 3/4 Time (November 26, 1995)
- Harts in High Season (March 24, 1996)
- Till Death Do Us Hart (August 25, 1996)

Lionel Stander reprised his role as Max in the first five movies until his death from lung cancer on November 30, 1994. His last screen appearance was in Secrets of the Hart.

== Remakes ==
=== 2002 ===
In November 2002, Alan Cumming was attached to a series being developed for ABC touted as a "gay Hart to Hart". Titled Mr and Mr Nash, the planned series featured a gay couple, both interior designers, who "stumble upon a murder each week", but never went into production.

=== 2015 ===
In September 2015, Deadline Hollywood reported that NBC made a script commitment to a Hart to Hart remake series featuring a gay male couple. Written by Christopher Fife and produced by Carol Mendelsohn and Julie Weitz, the new series, which also did not come to pass, was described as "a modern and sexy retelling of the classic series that focuses on by-the-book attorney Jonathan Hart and free-spirited investigator Dan Hartman, who must balance the two sides of their life: action-packed crime-solving in the midst of newly found domesticity".

== Home media ==
Sony Pictures Home Entertainment released the first two seasons of Hart to Hart on DVD in Regions 1 & 2 in 2005/2006.

In 2010/2011, Sony Pictures released all eight TV movies on DVD individually via the Warner Archive Collection. These were Manufacture-on-Demand (MOD) releases and are available exclusively through WBShop.com and Amazon.com. In 2012, Sony released all eight TV movies in two volume collections titled Hart to Hart: TV Movie Collection, Volume 1 and Hart to Hart: TV Movie Collection, Volume 2. These are also manufacture-on-demand (MOD) releases, available via Amazon.com, and are part of the Sony Choice Collection.

In 2014, Shout! Factory acquired the rights to the series for Region 1. They released Season 3 in 2014, Season 4 and 5 in 2015, and The Complete Series in 2017.

DVD Name	Ep#	Release dates		
DVD Name	Ep#	Region 1 (USCA)	Region 2 (DACH)	Region 2 (UKIE)
The Complete First Season	23	October 25, 2005	November 8, 2005	April 10, 2006
The Complete Second Season	20	September 19, 2006	September 19, 2006	October 9, 2006
The Complete Third Season	24	December 9, 2014	TBA	TBA
The Complete Fourth Season	22	February 10, 2015	TBA	TBA
The Complete Fifth and Final Season	22	June 9, 2015	TBA	TBA
The Complete Series	111	May 30, 2017	TBA	TBA
Hart to Hart: TV Movie Collection, Volume 1	4	October 2, 2012	N/A	N/A
Hart to Hart: TV Movie Collection, Volume 2	4	October 2, 2012	N/A	N/A
Hart to Hart – Movies Are Murder Collection	8	August 13, 2019	N/A	N/A

== The Greatest Event in Television History (2013) ==
On June 6, 2013 (June 7 in the Eastern Time Zone), Adult Swim aired an edition of The Greatest Event in Television History. Hosted by Jeff Probst, the program went behind the scenes during the making of a shot-for-shot remake of the Hart to Hart opening sequence, with Adam Scott and Amy Poehler respectively in the roles of Jonathan and Jennifer Hart, and Horatio Sanz as Max. The remake followed a similar effort in the fall of 2012, adapting the opening credit sequence of Simon & Simon.
