= Amy (1984 film) =

British television film

- Genre: Drama
- Written by: Roger Milner
- Directed by: Nat Crosby
- Starring: Harriet Walter; Clive Francis; George A. Cooper
- Composer: Dudley Simpson
- Country of origin: United Kingdom
- Original language: English

Production
- Producer: Innes Lloyd
- Cinematography: Remi Adefarasin
- Running time: 95 minutes
- Production company: Compact TV

Original release
- Network: BBC One
- Release: 2 January 1984

Amy is a 1984 British television drama film directed by Nat Crosby and starring Harriet Walter, Clive Francis and George A. Cooper. It portrays the life of the pioneering British pilot Amy Johnson in the years leading up to her disappearance in 1941.

== Main cast ==
- Harriet Walter as Amy Johnson
- Clive Francis as Jim Mollison
- George A. Cooper as Will Johnson
- Stephanie Cole as Cis Johnson
- Robert Pugh as Jack Humphreys
- Patrick Troughton as Lord Rothermere
- John Grillo as Bell
- Roger Hammond as Sir Sefton Brancker
- Denys Hawthorne as Col. Francis Shelmerdine
- Richard Durden as Captain Bill Hope
- Douglas Reith as Jimmy Martin

== Bibliography ==
- Crosby, Nat. A Cameraman Abroad: From "Panorama" to Paranoia. Larks Press, 2002.
