= Clive Francis =

British actor (born 1946)

- Born: 26 June 1946 (age 80); Eastbourne, Sussex, England
- Occupation: Actor
- Years active: 1962–present
- Spouse: Natalie Ogle (m. 1989)

Clive Francis (born 26 June 1946) is a British actor and illustrator, known for his work in television, film, and theatre. He has appeared in television dramas and comedies, including Poldark, Yes, Prime Minister, and The Crown. His film credits include A Clockwork Orange (1971) and Mr. Turner (2014). Francis has performed with the Royal Shakespeare Company and in West End productions. He is also an illustrator, having produced artwork for books and theatre productions.

== Early life ==
Francis was born in Eastbourne, Sussex. He is the son of actors Raymond Francis and his second wife Margaret Towner.

His father played Detective Chief Superintendent Tom Lockhart in the 1960s series No Hiding Place. His mother played Jira, Anakin Skywalker's friend, in Star Wars: Episode I – The Phantom Menace in 1999.

== Career ==
Clive Francis began his acting career at the age of 16 in weekly repertory as a Penguin Player at Bexhill-on-Sea and has acted on stage, radio, television and films.

He is also a caricaturist and has had several exhibitions at the National Theatre. His caricatures have appeared on the covers of several books including Blessings in Disguise by Alec Guinness and a biography of John Gielgud. His own publications include: Laughlines, There Is Nothing Like a Dane (Hamlet) There Is Nothing Like a Thane (Macbeth). A Star is Drawn and The Many Faces of Gielgud, to celebrate Gielgud's 90th birthday.

=== Film ===
Francis appeared as Joe the Lodger in Stanley Kubrick's A Clockwork Orange (1971). His other films include Inspector Clouseau (1968), The Man Who Had Power Over Women (1970), Girl Stroke Boy (1971), Villain (1971), Pierrepoint (2005), Mr. Turner, (2014), The Lost City of Z, (2015), The Crown (2016),The Little Stranger (2018), Official Secrets (2019), Cursed (2019), and Archbishop in Dolittle (2020).

=== Television ===
His first television role was playing Tommy Traddles opposite Ian McKellen in the 1966 production of Charles Dickens' David Copperfield.

Francis considers his part as Mr. Sloane in the ITV Playhouse production of Entertaining Mr Sloane in 1968 as his first look important television role, appearing alongside the likes of Sheila Hancock and Edward Woodward. He states on his website that the production was taped just a week after the murder of playwright Joe Orton.

Francis played the character of Willoughby in the BBC's 1971 production of Sense and Sensibility. In the BBC's first adaptation of Poldark (1975–76), he played Ross Poldark's weak, troubled and debt-ridden cousin Francis. He played Det. Sgt. Dexter in New Scotland Yard in 1974. In the 1976 television adaptation of George Bernard Shaw's Caesar and Cleopatra, he portrayed Apollodorus opposite Alec Guinness. Francis appeared opposite Laurence Olivier in Saturday, Sunday, Monday, a play which was part of the Laurence Olivier Presents series for Granada Television. He also appeared as Standartenfuhrer Grunwald in Enemy at the Door.

In 1981, Francis played the Roman officer and imperial spy Attius in the ABC miniseries Masada opposite Peter O'Toole. In 1986, Francis guest starred in episode five, "The Man with the Twisted Lip," of the series Sherlock Holmes, as Neville St Clair. Francis starred in the series The 10%ers; The Piglet Files (which as noted above used his caricatures in the credits), as Colonel Windham in Sharpe's Company and May to December.

Francis has guest-starred in television programmes, including Yes, Prime Minister, in which he played Luke, a private secretary for foreign affairs, who, the Prime Minister is told, is in fact a spy for the Foreign Office, a department whose policy is often in conflict with the PM's.

His television work also includes: The Rear Column, The Critic, Pierrepoint, New Tricks and Lipstick on Your Collar. In 2016, he played the part of Lord Salisbury in the Netflix series The Crown.

=== Theatre ===
His first West End appearance was in There's a Girl in My Soup opposite Donald Sinden. Since then, he has gone on to appear in over twenty West End shows including, The School for Scandal, The Importance of Being Ernest, The Rear Column, Benefactors, The Return of A. J. Raffles, Bloomsbury, Single Spies, Look after Lulu!, The Circle, Entertaining Mr Sloane, What the Butler Saw, Gross Indecency, Enron, The Madness of King George and Inspector Calls.

He also appeared at the National Theatre in A Small Family Business, 'Tis Pity She's a Whore, Never so Good and Les Blancs. For the RSC, Francis appeared in Three Hours after Marriage, Troilus and Cressida and A Christmas Carol.

He regularly tours his one-man version of Charles Dickens' A Christmas Carol, a show that he has taken from France to Ireland to Monaco and many major towns and cities in the UK.

=== Adaptations ===
Apart from adapting A Christmas Carol as his one-man show, Clive Francis has also brought from the page to the stage The Hound of the Baskervilles, Three Men in a Boat, Graham Greene's Our Man in Havana, and Susan Hill's The Small Hand. Together with composer Charles Miller, he adapted the book and wrote the lyrics to the Alice in Wonderland adaptation, Alice the Musical!.

In February 2015, he played the part of Frank Doel in the Salisbury Playhouse's production of 84, Charing Cross Road. This was a production he repeated at the Arts Theatre, Cambridge in 2016.

== Personal life ==
Francis has been married to actress Natalie Ogle since 1989.

== Selected filmography ==
- Inspector Clouseau (1968) as Clyde Hargreaves
- The Man Who Had Power Over Women (1970) as Barry Black
- Villain (1971) as Vivian
- A Clockwork Orange (1971) as Joe the Lodger
- Girl Stroke Boy (1973) as Laurie
- Masada (1981, TV series) as Attius, Head Tribune
- Amy (1984, TV film) as Jim Mollison
- Pierrepoint (2005) as Field Marshal Bernard Montgomery
- Mr. Turner (2014) as Sir Martin Archer Shee
- The Crown (2016–2017, TV series) as Lord Salisbury
- The Lost City of Z (2017) as Sir John Scott Keltie
- Official Secrets (2019) as Admiral Nick Wilkinson
- Cursed (2020, TV series) as Pope Abel
