= List of Hart to Hart episodes =

This is a list of episodes for the television series Hart to Hart. This series consists of a 2-hour pilot, five seasons of episodes, and eight TV-movies.

== Series overview ==
At present, the pilot, the first two seasons, and all of the TV-movies have been released on DVD by Sony Pictures Home Entertainment. Seasons three, four, and five have been released by Shout! Factory.

Season	Episodes	Originally released		Rank	Rating
Season	Episodes	First released	Last released	Rank	Rating
Pilot		August 25, 1979		—N/a	—N/a
1	22	September 22, 1979	May 13, 1980	—N/a	—N/a
2	20	November 11, 1980	May 26, 1981	23	19.9
3	24	October 6, 1981	May 18, 1982	15	21.1 (Note: Tied with Trapper John, M.D.)
4	22	September 28, 1982	May 10, 1983	17	18.9
5	22	September 27, 1983	May 22, 1984	46	15.6
TV movies		November 5, 1993	August 25, 1996	—N/a	—N/a

== Episodes ==
=== Pilot (1979) ===
Title	Directed by	Written by	Original release date
"Hart to Hart"	Tom Mankiewicz	Tom Mankiewicz & Sidney Sheldon	August 25, 1979
A friend of millionaire Jonathan Hart appears to have committed suicide whilst driving home from The Golden Goose Health Spa. Jonathan is joined undercover by his wife, Jennifer, as they try to find out what really happened.: Guest Stars: Jill St. John, Roddy McDowall, Stella Stevens

=== Season 1 (1979–80) ===
No. overall	No. in season	Title	Directed by	Written by	Original release date
1	1	"Hit Jennifer Hart"	Tom Mankiewicz	T : Tom Mankiewicz; S/T : Rogers Turrentine	September 22, 1979
Jonathan breaks up a semi-slavery ring operated by one of his shipping line's executives, but the now-fired manager sends a hit man (Craig Wasson) to pretend to be Jennifer's cousin and terminate her as a warning.
2	2	"Passport to Murder"	Ray Austin	David T. Levinson	September 29, 1979
A yacht trip becomes dangerous when one of the Harts' guests is blackmailed into running drugs.
3	3	"Jonathan Hart Jr."	Ray Austin	Vicki King	October 6, 1979
An innocent woman (Dee Wallace) is blackmailed by her ex-husband into using their son to extort money from Jonathan.
4	4	"Death in the Slow Lane"	Sam Wanamaker	T : David Solomon; S/T : Donald Ross	October 13, 1979
When Jonathan buys Jennifer a rare antique car for her birthday, she is less than thrilled – but two Brits (Jeremy Brett and Andra Akers) seem suspiciously eager to take it off her hands.
5	5	"You Made Me Kill You"	Leo Penn	S : Lawrence Hertzog; T : Edward Martino & Laurence Richards	October 23, 1979
A young woman (Kathleen Lloyd) in the Hart Industries accounting department is obsessed with Jonathan and wants to take Jennifer's place. Note: Show moved to Tuesdays starting with this episode.
6	6	"Murder Between Friends"	Seymour Robbie	S : Walt Rappeport, E. Jeffrey Smith; T : Laurence Richards	October 30, 1979
Two of the Harts' friends are suspects in the murder of a famous divorce attorney – and neither they nor the attorney's widow really want to answer Jennifer's and Jonathan's questions.
7	7	"Cop Out"	Ralph Senensky	S : Sherry Sonnett; T : David Solomon	November 6, 1979
When a prostitute is murdered, one of Jennifer's former sources asks her to investigate---endangering Jennifer, who's unaware at first that the killer targets redheads. Guest stars: Markie Post and Bert Remsen.
8	8	"Max in Love"	Leo Penn	S : Bruce Darling & Will Thornbury; S/T : Edward Martino & David Solomon	November 13, 1979
Max has met a lovely woman who seems to enjoy his company also – but she's part of a theft ring that cleaned out the Harts and tries to frame Max for murder. Guest stars: René Auberjonois and Daniel J. Travanti.
9	9	"A New Kind of High"	Alan Cooke	S : Laurence Richards; T : Edward Martino, Sherry Sonnet	November 27, 1979
Two chemists (Paul Ryan Rudd, Karen Austin) at Jonathan's chemical subsidiary have developed a new hallucinogen---and killed their supervisor after he threatens to expose them to Jonathan.
10	10	"With This Gun, I Thee Wed"	Seymour Robbie	S : Bob Shayne; T : Richard De Roy	December 4, 1979
The Harts receive a last-minute invitation to the wedding of Jonathan's old girlfriend (Christine Belford) and discover she is being forced into a marriage to an old nemesis, Alex Constantine (Richard Johnson)---unless she wants her injured brother imprisoned for two deaths he didn't commit. Guest stars: Vincent Schiavelli and Tommy Lasorda.
11	11	"The Man with the Jade Eyes"	Tom Mankiewicz	S : James J. Agazzi, Marshall Williams; T : Edward Martino	December 11, 1979
A man collapses at the Harts' restaurant table and asks them to protect the man with jade eyes and take him to the temple. Guest stars: Edward Mulhare and James Hong.
12	12	"Color Jennifer Dead"	Alex March	S : Paul W. Cooper; T : Edward Martino & David Solomon	January 8, 1980
The man painting Jennifer's portrait dies, supposedly while driving drunk, but the Harts don't believe the official explanation---especially knowing the artist was a five-years-recovering alcoholic.
13	13	"A Question of Innocence"	Ralph Senensky	Allyn Freeman	January 15, 1980
The lady (Jeanette Nolan) who runs the newsstand in Jonathan's building is being blackmailed for a murder she may not have committed---that of her dead grandson's academic mentor . . . and drug supplier.
14	14	"Night Horrors"	Ray Austin	Bill LaMond & Jo LaMond	January 22, 1980
At the haunted house recently purchased by the Harts' "weird" friends Fred and Amanda, a dinner party turns into a deadly treasure hunt. Guest stars: Paul Shenar, Cynthia Harris, Barney Martin, Mews Small, Arlen Dean Snyder, Fred Stuthman, Nina van Pallandt
15	15	"Which Way, Freeway?"	Ray Austin	Mary Ann Kasica & Michael Scheff	January 29, 1980
Freeway, the Harts' dog, has got a new girlfriend, and when her master is killed Freeway disappears with the gun – but doesn't have it when he gets home.
16	16	"Downhill to Death"	Tom Mankiewicz	Bill LaMond & Jo LaMond	February 5, 1980
When Jennifer overhears an acquaintance (Rod McCary) planning to murder his wife (Juliet Mills) on the ski slopes, she and Jonathan jet off to Vail to prevent it . . . but the wife isn't the one who winds up dead.
17	17	"The Raid"	Leo Penn	Allyn Freeman	February 26, 1980
When a researcher is kidnapped in a South American country by an old adversary of Jonathan's, Jonathan undertakes to personally deliver the ransom and ensure the safety of the researcher and his pregnant wife.
18	18	"Sixth Sense"	Ralph Senensky	S : Bill Taub; S/T : Bill LaMond, Jo LaMond	March 11, 1980
A precognitive young woman, Sara Morgan (Laurie Heineman), sees herself being murdered, but it is her unknown twin sister, and she indeed turns up dead. The twins were given up for adoption and don't know about each other. The Harts suspect that she was killed by her greedy half-brother Gordon (Paul Bryar), who hired a PI, Al Teresi (Joe Mantell) to find her for their grandfather, Herb Whitley (Eduard Franz), who wants her to inherit some of his estate. When Al Teresi finds her, Gordon kills her and tries to hush it up. Using Gordon's weakness for fortune tellers, the Harts and Max hold a seance for Gordon's benefit that is the climax of the episode. Sara appears as the spirit of the murdered girl and then puts her hand on his shoulder as a real live person, whereupon Gordon says "This can't be, I killed you," and the police come out from behind the curtain and arrest him. The seance has to be seen to be believed.
19	19	"Does She or Doesn't She?"	George W. Brooks	Jeff Myrow & Donna Myrow	March 18, 1980
Hairdresser Barry styles the hair of the creme de la creme. But when his clients wind up blackmailed to pay Barry's loan shark, and an angry victim shoots up Barry's salon, can the Harts help Barry break free before someone else winds up dead? Eve Arden plays Barry's receptionist.
20	20	"Cruise at Your Own Risk"	Earl Bellamy	Bill LaMond, Jo LaMond & E. Nick Alexander	April 8, 1980
A diamond theft on a cruise ship owned by Jonathan leads the Harts to join the cruise ship to catch the thief---who may be taking orders from ship crew members.
21	21	"Too Many Cooks Are Murder"	Frank Beascoechea	Mary Ann Kasica & Michael Scheff	May 6, 1980
Maurice, a famous French chef and chemist, has created something world-changing and wants to distribute it through Jonathan's company, but before he can tell Jonathan about it, he is killed and his recipes stolen.
22	22	"Death Set"	Tom Mankiewicz	Stanley Roberts, Bill LaMond & Jo LaMond	May 13, 1980
Marital suspicions lead a woman to accidentally kill her husband, but when his debt-ridden brother tries to step into his place, the Harts blow his cover and the widow may take her own revenge.

=== Season 2 (1980–81) ===
No. overall	No. in season	Title	Directed by	Written by	Original release date
23	1	"Murder, Murder on the Wall"	Tom Mankiewicz	Robert E. Swanson	November 11, 1980
Vacationing in New York City, the Harts look forward to a nice lunch with Jennifer's friend and her new husband, but her husband suddenly disappears and is shortly found dead. Meanwhile, two men who followed him out of the restaurant next show up in his L.A. apartment and start following who they think is his wife: Jennifer.
24	2	"What Murder?"	John Patterson	Bill LaMond & Jo LaMond	November 18, 1980
After witnessing a young woman's murder unexpectedly through a telescope in his friend's business office, Jonathan stumbles trying to pursue and catch the killer but hits his head and loses his memory. As he tries to recover he suspects the dead woman may have been his own mistress---and that he might have killed her.
25	3	"This Lady Is Murder"	Earl Bellamy	S : Barbara Butler; T : Paul L. Ehrmann	November 25, 1980
Jennifer has a doppelganger, married to a man who let his old partners take the fall for a robbery. The doppelganger reluctantly agrees to help Jonathan after Jennifer is kidnapped by one of the partners demanding a share of the crime's proceeds.
26	4	"Murder Is a Man's Best Friend"	Tom Mankiewicz	Donald Ross	December 9, 1980
Freeway is chosen to star in a new dog food ad campaign, but the creator has a secret ingredient and will kill to hide it.
27	5	"'Tis the Season to Be Murdered"	Earl Bellamy	Lawrence Hertzog	December 16, 1980
While investigating design thefts from Hart Industries' toymaking subsidiary Hartoy, Jonathan's investigator (Jack Riley) is poisoned while leaving a progress meeting, prompting the Harts to go undercover to find the thief---and his apparently deadly counterfeit toys.
28	6	"Murder Wrap"	Michael Hiatt	Bill LaMond & Jo LaMond	January 6, 1981
An Egyptologist is killed just before the opening of a stagey exhibit, featuring the mummy of an ancient Egyptian prince whom legend says is waiting for his princess to join him in death – and she looks just like Jennifer.
29	7	"Murder in Paradise"	Tom Mankiewicz	Allyn Freeman	January 13, 1981
Jonathan and Jennifer are in Hawaii for a croquet tournament when a tournament official is stabbed, and the Harts wind up in an international dilemma involving the KGB, MI-6, the CIA, and a fancy key that may unlock deadly secrets.
30	8	"Ex-Wives Can Be Murder"	Alex March	Mary Ann Kasica & Michael Scheff	January 20, 1981
When Max's long-dead ex-wife suddenly reappears, kidnapping and a hot diamond necklace are not far behind.
31	9	"Murder Is a Drag"	Leo Penn	Donald Ross	February 3, 1981
After having to buy tickets from a scalper for the opera with Jennifer, Jonathan is mistaken for a six-figure hit man he discovers was hired to assassinate the district attorney fighting an organized crime drug operation.
32	10	"Hart-Shaped Murder"	Harry Mastrogeorge	Bill LaMond & Jo LaMond	February 10, 1981
The Harts want to give their charity committee gourmet chocolate hearts as a thank-you, but when one turns out to have been part of a smuggling operation, can Jonathan and Jennifer figure out what is going on before someone tries the "special" chocolates from an unknown admirer?
33	11	"Slow Boat to Murder"	Leo Penn	Mary Ann Kasica & Michael Scheff	February 17, 1981
Hart Industries's industrious but slightly awkward chief accountant Stanley Friesen, is set up to take a murder rap after an evening on the town. In an attempt to clear him, the Harts retrace his steps (and act as singles) which leads them to discover a gambling ring. Guest star: Joanna Cassidy
34	12	"Murder in the Saddle"	Earl Bellamy	Anthony Yerkovich	February 24, 1981
It's roundup time at the Harts' ranch, but Jonathan and Jennifer are distracted by dying animals, a rumored chemical spill orchestrated by a Texan hoping to strip mine valuable coal from the area, and a murder in which the local sheriff may be involved.
35	13	"Homemade Murder"	Tom Mankiewicz	S : Arnold Somkin; T : Leonard Kantor, Bill LaMond, & Jo LaMond	March 3, 1981
A new Hart employee (Millie Perkins) delivers some papers to Jonathan, along with evidence of a murder. She hides the clue---a bullet---in Freeway's toy and the Harts are held hostage by the murderer (Keene Curtis).
36	14	"Solid Gold Murder"	Earl Bellamy	Les Carter	March 24, 1981
Max's bodybuilder nephew Vince is about to open a gym, but someone tries to steal Vince's famous red barbells---twice. They leave Max injured the first time and a Scotland Yard inspector dead the second time, muttering the name Noel Teppman, an almost-mythical gold thief (Cesare Danova) who had his stolen gold formed into the barbells. When Jonathan discovers the ruse, he sets a trap for Teppman. Technical error: Gold is 2.45 times as dense as iron, and a gold barbell would appear very different.
37	15	"Getting Aweigh with Murder"	Harry Mastrogeorge	Allyn Freeman	April 14, 1981
To catch a group of counterfeiters who murdered an investigator, Jennifer and Jonathan go on a cruise, she posing as a European countess and he working as a ship's steward.
38	16	"The Murder of Jonathan Hart"	Earl Bellamy	S : David Loughery; S/T : Mary Ann Kasica & Michael Scheff	April 28, 1981
After two attempts on his life, Jonathan stages his own murder to see who's trying to get him out of the way---and why a stranger who once helped him out of a snowdrift turns up with a will supposedly leaving Hart Industries to him . . . and with representation by Jonathan's own corporate lawyer (Peter Mark Richman) who's now putting moves on Jennifer.
39	17	"The Latest in High Fashion Murder"	Tom Mankiewicz	Bill LaMond & Jo LaMond	May 5, 1981
After a young model is killed at a fashion party, Jennifer and Jonathan agree to pose for a fashion shoot that leads to another murder. But Jennifer may have been the intended victim. This episode includes a cover version of the music from Fame. Guest star: Lois Chiles. Note: During one scene, the Styx song "Half-Penny, Two-Penny" from their album Paradise Theatre can be prominently heard.
40	18	"Operation Murder"	John Patterson	Lawrence Hertzog	May 12, 1981
Jennifer suffers a concussion in a fall at the park, meaning no one but Jonathan believes she witnessed a patient's murder in a small hospital where her debt-ridden doctor (Jared Martin) is part of a scheme that the FBI have been investigating for several years.
41	19	"Murder Takes a Bow"	Harry Winer	Mary Ann Kasica & Michael Scheff	May 19, 1981
When a playwright friend of the Harts is killed and the Harts' copy of his last work is snatched, Jonathan is convinced something in the play motivated the murderer.
42	20	"Blue Chip Murder"	Dennis Donnelly	Donald Ross	May 26, 1981
After discovering their house burgled, the Harts find a hidden room---and learn the original architect/owner kept a fortune in bonds in that room, a fortune targeted by a young broker at the finance firm where the architect did business in his younger years.

=== Season 3 (1981–82) ===
No. overall	No. in season	Title	Directed by	Written by	Original release date
43	1	"Harts and Flowers"	Harry Winer	Tom Swale & Duane Poole	October 6, 1981
Max creates a rose hybrid he calls the Jennifer Hart Rose and enters it in a prestigious contest under Jennifer's name. She becomes the target for murder when she is stalked by a psychotic leading judge.
44	2	"A Couple of Harts"	Dennis Donnelly	Kenneth Alan Berg	October 13, 1981
While vacationing in Acapulco, the Harts' borrowed car breaks down. They ask for help at the nearby estate and find themselves posing as domestics, attempting to prevent a politically motivated assassination.
45	3	"Hartland Express"	Dennis Donnelly	Ross Teel	November 3, 1981
An air traffic controllers' strike forces Jennifer and Jonathan to take a train from Chicago to Los Angeles. When Jennifer discovers the dead body of Jim Casey (David Doyle) hidden in their closet, the Harts become involved in protecting a government witness (Carol Lynley) from would-be assassins.
46	4	"What Becomes a Murder Most?"	Harry Winer	Donald P. Roos	November 10, 1981
An ad campaign for a costly fake fur using high society ladies as models, including Jennifer, turns deadly when one of the women is murdered. After another woman is killed, Jonathan wants the ads ended to protect Jennifer from any danger.
47	5	"Murder Up Their Sleeve"	Tom Mankiewicz	Mary Ann Kasica & Michael Scheff	November 17, 1981
A magician (Harry Blackstone Jr.) and his brother, who has had surgery to look just like Jonathan, plan to replace him and gain control of the Hart empire.
48	6	"Harts Under Glass"	Harry Winer	S : Lawrence Hertzog; S/T : Bill LaMond & Jo LaMond	November 24, 1981
The Harts get trapped in a glass cage by an eccentric art collector (John Dehner). However, he only wants Jennifer, not Jonathan. A diamond ring given to Jennifer by Jonathan for their fifth anniversary enables their escape from the glass-walled room where they are being held captive.
49	7	"Rhinestone Harts"	Dennis Donnelly	Tom Swale & Duane Poole	December 1, 1981
The Harts new musical investment, singer Lorene Tyler (country music guest star Charly McClain), is beginning an international tour. The singer's husband Jesse, a jewel thief, has a costume made for her that sparkles with diamonds disguised as rhinestones. After the outfit is loaned to Jennifer, Lorene's husband is desperate to retrieve it. Robert Englund also stars.
50	8	"Hart of Darkness"	Karen Arthur	Lawrence Hertzog	December 8, 1981
A psychotic man (Ed Harris) pours a blinding chemical into the Harts' pool. Seconds after Jonathan dives in for his morning swim, he surfaces, screaming in pain. After Jonathan is rushed to the hospital, the unexplained attacks continue.
51	9	"Hartbreak Kid"	Robert Loggia	Bill LaMond & Jo LaMond	December 15, 1981
The Harts' filly, J.J. Hart, looks like a winner. However, two men with a great deal riding on the upcoming horse race can't afford to have their horse beaten.
52	10	"From the Depths of My Hart"	Tom Mankiewicz	Bill LaMond & Jo LaMond	January 5, 1982
Combining business with pleasure, the Harts scuba dive off the coast of Largos, testing an innovative underwater camera for the Navy. Early afternoon, as the Harts stroll along the beach, the body of a Navy SEAL working on the project washes on shore. Lionel Stander does not appear in this episode. Note: This episode aired 37 days after Robert Wagner's wife, Natalie Wood, drowned off Santa Catalina Island.
53	11	"Hartless Hobby"	Earl Bellamy	Donald P. Roos	January 12, 1982
The Harts visit the gallery of a well-known stamp collector to see the Vermillion, the most valuable stamp in the world. However, they soon gain possession of the stamp, and find their lives are in serious danger.
54	12	"My Hart Belongs to Daddy"	Dennis Donnelly	Rick Husky	January 19, 1982
Jennifer's reunion with her father in Washington D.C. is laced with danger and surprise when she learns he was an intelligence officer in World War II and is now the target of an assassination conspiracy by an unhinged German man seeking revenge for his own father's death.
55	13	"Hart of Diamonds"	Harry Winer	Carol Saraceno & Stephen Richmond	February 2, 1982
After the owner of the salon she's visiting hypnotizes her into stealing valuable baubles from her friends as well as the jewelry store, Jennifer is branded a jewel thief.
56	14	"Harts and Palms"	Tom Mankiewicz	Bill LaMond, Jo LaMond & Allyn Freeman	February 9, 1982
On a restful trip to Maui, the Harts become involved in a murder when Jennifer hears the wife of Jonathan's business associate plotting to murder her husband. Guest star Jonathan Frakes plays Adam Blake.
57	15	"The Hart of the Matter"	Earl Bellamy	Tom Swale & Duane Poole	February 16, 1982
A remote island, an exotic European chateau, and the mysterious disappearance of a publisher they were supposed to meet on the French Riviera are not what the Harts anticipated when planning their romantic getaway.
58	16	"Blue and Broken-Harted"	Michael Hiatt	Allan R. Folsom;	February 23, 1982
Jonathan and Jennifer enact a troubled marriage in very public places to flush out the culprit who is trying to cause a rift between them and why. Guest star Michael Lerner plays Arthur.
59	17	"Harts on Their Toes"	Peter Medak	Bill LaMond & Jo LaMond	March 2, 1982
The Harts become involved in international intrigue when they infiltrate a ballet company to clear a world-renowned Soviet dancer of murder charges.
60	18	"Deep in the Hart of Dixieland"	Earl Bellamy	Donald P. Roos	March 9, 1982
While attempting to clear a friend of murder charges, the Harts become entangled in a disturbed woman's fantasies.
61	19	"Vintage Harts"	Harry Winer	Donald P. Roos	March 23, 1982
Jonathan's vineyard partner discovers that their wine, Hart-Cabri, is being sold as a more expensive vintage, "Chateau St Claire". After his partner is murdered, Hart investigates. Guest star Carolyn Seymour.
62	20	"Hart, Line and Sinker"	Cliff Bole	Stephen Katz & Peter Elliot	March 30, 1982
The Harts just want the solitude of their mountain cabin for a weekend. Instead, they end up trying to rescue their caretaker who has been framed for murder by the local sheriff. Guest stars: Lane Smith, Barry Corbin, Dominique Dunne
63	21	"Hart and Sole"	Earl Bellamy	Lawrence Hertzog	April 6, 1982
Jonathan's new suit has been switched with another. To save time he decides to make the exchange himself rather than through the tailor. At the other man's hotel room, Jonathan and Jennifer discover a body.
64	22	"The Harts Strike Out"	Peter Medak	Donald P. Roos	May 4, 1982
A friend of Jonathan dies leaving his widow and son with a valuable assortment of baseball cards. Before the Harts can sell the collection for the family, it is stolen.
65	23	"To Coin a Hart"	Karen Arthur	T : Bill LaMond & Jo LaMond; S/T : Catherine Bacos	May 11, 1982
Jennifer's purchase of a flower from a blind woman leads to an attempted kidnapping when the change she receives is not a quarter, but a very valuable rare coin.
66	24	"Harts and Fraud"	Gabrielle Beaumont	Donna Pekkonen	May 18, 1982
The Harts face a two-million-dollar wrongful death suit when a fender bender results in a driver's death. The couple immediately suspects insurance fraud, which leads them to a crooked lawyer.

=== Season 4 (1982–83) ===
No. overall	No. in season	Title	Directed by	Written by	Original release date	Prod. code
67	1	"On a Bed of Harts"	Leo Penn	Bill LaMond & Jo LaMond	September 28, 1982	401-192005
Jonathan decides to purchase his and Jennifer's Honeymoon bed, but the wrong bed is delivered. In their search for the "real" bed, the Harts become entangled in an international art smuggling scheme through San Francisco and the Napa Valley.
68	2	"With This Hart, I Thee Wed"	Burt Brinckerhoff	Madeline DiMaggio & Mary DiMaggio	October 12, 1982	402
The Harts witness a murder when the spiritual mentor and bridegroom of Jennifer's aunt meets an untimely death. Guest stars: Eva Gabor, Keene Curtis, William Windom.
69	3	"Million Dollar Harts"	Harry Winer	Richard Raskind	October 19, 1982	403-192004
While waiting for Jonathan to finish a meeting in a London casino, Jennifer is used as an unwitting pawn to transport money to the United States by a Baron.
70	4	"Harts on Campus"	Peter Medak	Donald P. Roos	October 26, 1982	404-192022
Jonathan joins Jennifer at her prep school reunion and is drugged by a former admirer who wants Jennifer for himself. Guest Stars: Kip Niven, Oliver Clark
71	5	"Harts at High Noon"	Gabrielle Beaumont	Alan Rachins	November 9, 1982	405-192015
Jonathan and Jennifer are asked to buy an apparently bankrupt ghost town.
72	6	"Hart's Desire"	Kevin Connor	B. Edwin & Lana Sands	November 16, 1982	406-192013
Jennifer's former professor asks her to pose as a romance fiction writer during a promotional appearance. Guest Stars: Ray Walston, Dean Stockwell, Joanna Barnes
73	7	"Rich and Hartless"	Michael Hiatt	Lawrence Hertzog	November 23, 1982	407-192020
Max is duped into thinking he won a million dollars, and he leaves the Harts to thieves who take over the house. Guest Star: Gloria DeHaven
74	8	"In the Hart of the Night"	Gabrielle Beaumont	Story by : Lisa Lazarus; Teleplay by : Tom Swale & Duane Poole	November 30, 1982	408-192002
Jonathan and Jennifer try to help a king save his culture's golden statue after it is stolen and replaced with a worthless look-alike.
75	9	"One Hart Too Many"	Peter Medak	Paul Boorstin & Sharon Boorstin	December 7, 1982	192006
Jennifer finds herself in over her head at the Grey Gables Health Farm when the doctor in charge is killing guests and replacing them with lookalikes.
76	10	"A Christmas Hart"	Gabrielle Beaumont	Rowby Goren	December 21, 1982	192025
Jonathan and Jennifer are robbed during a birthday party for Max and go undercover for Jingle-Grams.
77	11	"Hunted Harts"	Gabrielle Beaumont	Story by : Donald Ross and Hugh McKay & Amelia Anderson; Teleplay by : Donald Ross	January 4, 1983	192026
While visiting a wildlife reserve, Jonathan and Jennifer are hunted as prey by a competitor of Hart Industries. Guest stars: Tippi Hedren, David McCallum, and Ian Bannen.
78	12	"Emily by Hart"	Bruce Kessler	Lawrence Hertzog	January 11, 1983	
A young reporter influenced by Jennifer is murdered by her fiance's employer.
79	13	"Pounding Harts"	Harry Winer	Donald P. Roos	January 18, 1983	192009
A drug trafficking scheme is ruined when Freeway's kennel is switched with one containing cocaine.
80	14	"Chamber of Lost Harts"	Reza Badiyi	Story by : Donald P.H. Eaton; Teleplay by : Donald P.H. Eaton and Bill & Jo LaMond	February 1, 1983	
Jonathan and Jennifer stumble into a plan to steal ancient treasures from a South American archaeological dig.
81	15	"Harts on the Scent"	Kevin Connor	Elaine Newman & Jaron Summers	February 15, 1983	
Jonathan buys a perfume factory following the murder of the owner by his chemist wife and her lover. Guest Star: Diana Muldaur
82	16	"Bahama Bound Harts"	Stuart Margolin	Story by : Donald Ross; Teleplay by : Donald Ross and Bill & Jo LaMond	February 22, 1983	
Jonathan and Jennifer travel to the Bahamas to meet with a recluse, and discover that his assistant has replaced him with an impostor to gain control of his fortune.
83	17	"As the Hart Turns"	Paul Krasny	Story by : Ronnie Wenker-Konner; Teleplay by : Ronnie Wenker-Konner & Donald Ross	March 1, 1983	
Jennifer wins a walk-on role on a soap opera which leads to a writing job that nearly gets her killed by the leading man.
84	18	"The Wayward Hart"	Kevin Connor	Mike Snyder & Elizabeth Tully	March 8, 1983	
Jonathan inadvertently buys Max a lethally poisonous cigar. Max leaves after Jonathan calls him predictable, leaving the Harts to try to find Max before it's too late.
85	19	"A Change of Hart"	Harry Winer	Bill LaMond & Jo LaMond	March 22, 1983	
A hitwoman (Julie Newmar) kills a commissioner and ends up taking Jonathan, Jennifer and Max hostage.
86	20	"Hartstruck"	Karen Arthur	Lawrence Hertzog	April 12, 1983	192035
A psychotic woman (Mimi Rogers) is obsessed with Jonathan and is killing anyone who gets in her way.
87	21	"Too Close to Hart"	Earl Bellamy	Donald P. Roos	May 3, 1983	192040
Art forgers are replacing masterpiece paintings with fakes and the Harts take action to trap them.
88	22	"A Lighter Hart"	Bruce Kessler	Donald P. Roos	May 10, 1983	192039
Jennifer's cousin slips into a coma after being continually drugged by the owners of a health club.

=== Season 5 (1983–84) ===
No. overall	No. in season	Title	Directed by	Written by	Original release date
89	1	"Two Harts Are Better Than One"	Kevin Connor	Lawrence Hertzog & Donald Ross	September 27, 1983
Jonathan and Jennifer remember how they first met and fell in love in the midst of murder and international intrigue in the picturesque locale of London.
90	2	"Straight Through the Hart"	Kevin Connor	Martin Roth	October 4, 1983
Jonathan thunders into the glamor and excitement of polo, unaware that he and Jennifer have become targets for murder in a smuggling scheme using a prized polo mallet to transport a million-dollar gem.
91	3	"Hostage Harts"	Paul Krasny	Donald Ross	October 18, 1983
Jennifer fears for Jonathan's life when ruthless jewel thieves take him hostage during a robbery while he's on a business trip in Paris.
92	4	"Pandora Has Wings"	Paul Krasny	Larry Forrester & Ronnie Wenker-Konner	October 25, 1983
Jennifer races to save Jonathan, who is serving as radar operator aboard a fighter jet rigged by a saboteur to explode during its top secret test mission.
93	5	"Harts and Hounds"	Kevin Connor	Lawrence Hertzog	November 1, 1983
A traditional fox hunt is marred by murder during the Harts' visit to England – and sends them off on the trail of a killer.
94	6	"Love Game"	Paul Krasny	Bill Froehlich, Stephen Kandel & Mark Lisson	November 8, 1983
Jonathan teams with tennis great Martina Navratilova in a game of doubles aimed at exposing a deceitful tennis pro and the stockbroker who is blackmailing him. Adam West guest stars.
95	7	"Passing Chance"	Paul Krasny	Lawrence Hertzog	November 15, 1983
While in Greece, Jonathan and Jennifer race to save their lives and the future of Hart Industries when a European business magnate seeks to destroy them during a cross-country car rally.
96	8	"Long Lost Love"	Karen Arthur	Donald P. Roos	November 22, 1983
A woman claims to be Jennifer's half-sister and her father believes she could be the daughter of his nurse during the war. Jonathan, however, is suspicious and sets out to find the truth.
97	9	"Highland Fling"	Ralph Senensky	Larry Forrester	November 29, 1983
Jonathan and Jennifer's delightful excursion to the Scottish Highland games is laced with danger when Jennifer becomes the target of a man who is her rival for leadership of a world-famous clan.
98	10	"Year of the Dog"	Karen Arthur	Lawrence Hertzog	December 13, 1983
The Harts' lives are at stake when a valuable ancient jade carving leads them into the heart of mysterious Macao, where they encounter a Chinese arms dealer who has become a threat to U.S. national security.
99	11	"Trust Your Hart"	Paul Krasny	Walter Dallenbach	December 20, 1983
In keeping with the season's spirit, Jonathan and Jennifer take in a girl (Kari Michaelson) who learns that her parents died in a car crash that left her comatose for seven years.
100	12	"Harts on the Run"	Paul Krasny	Towne Allen, Stephen Kandel & Carol Saraceno	January 3, 1984
Jennifer takes refuge in a convent after witnessing a gangland slaying. Jonathan must race to save her when the killer discovers her hiding place.
101	13	"Whispers in the Wings"	Seymour Robbie	Lawrence Hertzog	January 10, 1984
Jennifer is stalked by a psychotic stage manager who lurks in the wings as the Harts don top hats and tails to perform in a charity benefit in the Big Apple.
102	14	"Max's Waltz"	Karen Arthur	Patrick Mathews	January 17, 1984
Jennifer and Jonathan help Max search for his lady love, who has fallen victim to a pair of money-hungry crooks. Featuring guest star Dorothy Lamour.
103	15	"The Dog Who Knew Too Much"	Ralph Senensky	Stephen Kandel	January 24, 1984
Jonathan and Jennifer are stalked by dangerous industrial spies after they are entrusted with a dog that happens to be carrying a valuable biogenetic formula.
104	16	"Silent Dance"	George McCowan	Larry Forrester	January 31, 1984
A young figure skater's dreams of Olympic gold will be shattered unless Hart Industries can mix modern technology with the astounding talent of skater Tai Babilonia.
105	17	"Death Dig"	Paul Krasny	Larry Forrester	February 21, 1984
While vacationing on the exotic island of Rhodes, Jennifer and Jonathan become ensnared in a scheme for the smuggling of ancient Greek artifacts and are nearly entombed in the process. There is nice scenery from the island of Rhodes.
106	18	"The Shooting"	George McCowan	Marvin Himelfarb, Stephen Kandel & William Whitehead	February 28, 1984
Jennifer takes on a glamorous modeling assignment, not knowing that the camera is rigged with an explosive device, as Jonathan races to stop the deadly scheme concocted by a vengeful man from Jennifer's past.
107	19	"Slam Dunk"	Ralph Senensky	Shea E. Butler & Roderick Mann	March 6, 1984
Jonathan and Jennifer pose as a professor and a student in a dangerous scheme to expose the person responsible for the drug framing of Max's nephew, a college basketball star.
108	20	"Larsen's Last Jump"	Earl Bellamy	Larry Forrester	March 13, 1984
The Harts and Max are held at gunpoint when a murderer realizes that Jonathan has incriminating evidence linking him to the death of a champion skier.
109	21	"Always, Elizabeth"	Ralph Senensky	Lawrence Hertzog & Donald P. Roos	May 15, 1984
The Harts and Max fear for their lives when the debt-ridden nephew of Max's penpal believes Max is rich and comes to steal some of his fortune. Guest stars: June Allyson, Joe Pantoliano, and Robert Davi
110	22	"Meanwhile, Back at the Ranch"	Ray Austin	Stephen Kandel	May 22, 1984
Max is taken hostage. The Harts scramble to save him by participating in a scheme aimed at robbing an international jewel salesman of 20 million dollars in gems. Special Guest star: Patrick Macnee. Guest star: Denny Miller

== TV-movies (1993–96) ==
Title	Directed by	Written by	Original release date
Hart to Hart Returns	Peter H. Hunt	Richard Chapman, James G. Hirsch & E. Jack Kaplan	November 5, 1993
Jonathan expresses an interest in buying an aircraft company from a friend, and finds himself implicated in a murder case when corrupt defense contractors aim to prevent the takeover. Meanwhile, Jennifer has difficulty getting her latest story published and Max experiences problems training Freeway Jr.
Hart to Hart: Home Is Where the Hart Is	Peter H. Hunt	Lawrence Hertzog	February 18, 1994
When Jennifer's beloved teacher and mentor dies suddenly, she leaves the town she owned, Kingman's Ferry, to Jennifer. A trail of mysterious clues leads the Harts to long-kept secrets about the town that were directly tied to her friend's "accident," and it looks like they're destined to meet the same fate unless they can solve the mystery of Kingman's Ferry before it's too late.
Hart to Hart: Crimes of the Hart	Peter H. Hunt	Lawrence Hertzog	March 25, 1994
Someone is trying to sabotage a Broadway production of a play Jennifer wrote in college. When one of the stage hands is murdered, even Jonathan is a suspect. The Harts don't have much time to ensure that the show will go on.
Hart to Hart: Old Friends Never Die	Peter H. Hunt	Lawrence Hertzog	May 6, 1994
Jonathan and Jennifer travel to publisher Alfred Raines' private island for a party at which Raines is hoping to sign Jennifer to a writing contract. When Jennifer overhears someone plotting to murder a man during the weekend, she and Jonathan set out to discover who's trying to kill who and almost get themselves killed in the process.
Hart to Hart: Secrets of the Hart	Kevin Connor	Rob Gilmer	March 6, 1995
At a Hart Industries charity auction, Jennifer finds a locket that could hold the key to unlocking Jonathan's early years spent at the Mission Street Orphanage and the family he never knew. An exhibit of antique gold coins in danger of being stolen during the gala day of the auction also figures in the plot. Notes: Lionel Stander, who had played Max since the series started, died on November 30, 1994; this TV-movie marks his last appearance in this series. Donald Trump makes a cameo as himself.
Hart to Hart: Two Harts in 3/4 Time	Michael Tuchner	Mart Crowley & Donald Ross	November 26, 1995
Grief-stricken Jonathan and Jennifer travel to Montreal for the reading of Max's will. A special gift from Max to the Harts holds the key to murder, intrigue, and suicide. The episode's color copy is badly faded.
Hart to Hart: Harts in High Season	Christian I. Nyby II	Mart Crowley	March 24, 1996
The Harts travel to Australia to purchase a wildlife reserve from Jennifer's former love interest. Believing that Jonathan stole Jennifer from him years before, Elliott Manning plots to frame Jonathan for his murder and take back his beloved Jennifer.
Hart to Hart: Till Death Do Us Hart	Tom Mankiewicz	Bill Froehlich & Mark Lisson	August 25, 1996
Munich is the setting of yet another Hart anniversary, except this time Jennifer takes on a whole new personality. She's there to save a young boy's life, who knew she'd have to save her own too. Note: This TV-movie, which was the last of the series, was broadcast exactly 17 years after the series pilot and has the same director.
