= 84 Charing Cross Road (film) =

1987 film by David Hugh Jones

- Theatrical release poster
- Directed by: David Jones
- Written by: Hugh Whitemore
- Based on: 84, Charing Cross Road; 1970 book by Helene Hanff
- Produced by: Geoffrey Helman
- Starring: Anne Bancroft; Anthony Hopkins
- Cinematography: Brian West
- Edited by: Chris Wimble
- Music by: George Fenton
- Production company: Brooksfilms
- Distributed by: Columbia Pictures
- Release date: February 13, 1987 (United States)
- Running time: 99 minutes
- Countries: United Kingdom; United States
- Language: English

84 Charing Cross Road is a 1987 drama film directed by David Jones, and starring Anne Bancroft, Anthony Hopkins, Judi Dench, Mercedes Ruehl, and Jean De Baer. It is executive-produced by Bancroft's husband, Mel Brooks. The screenplay by Hugh Whitemore is based on a play by James Roose-Evans, which itself is an adaptation of the 1970 epistolary memoir of the same name by Helene Hanff — a compilation of letters between Hanff and Frank Doel and others dating from 1949 to 1968. Several characters who are not in the play were added for the film, including Hanff's Manhattan friends and Doel's wife Nora.

The film garnered mainly positive reviews from critics, as well as receiving numerous industry awards and nominations. Bancroft won the BAFTA Award for Best Actress in a Leading Role for her portrayal of Hanff. Additionally, Dench was nominated for the BAFTA Award for Best Actress in a Supporting Role, and Whitemore for Best Adapted Screenplay. Dench has said that 84 Charing Cross Road is one of her favourite films in which she has appeared. The film has become something of a cult classic among bibliophiles and epistemophiles.

== Plot ==
In 1971, New Yorker Helene Hanff is on an airplane heading for London. She is on a promotional tour for her book 84 Charing Cross Road which is about her 20-year correspondence with a secondhand bookshop specializing in out-of-print books.

By the time Helene arrives in London, the book shop has permanently closed, but she still visits it. To the sound of hammering and a builder's radio, Hanff recalls the first letter she wrote to the shop in 1949.

As a flashback, at a bookstore in 1949 in New York City, Hanff seeks obscure British literary classics. Frustrated after entering a fourth book shop without the books she seeks, she buys a copy of the Saturday Review of Literature. In it, she finds an advertisement placed by antiquarian booksellers Marks & Co, located at the titular address in London. She contacts the shop, where chief buyer and manager Frank Doel fulfills her requests.

Over time, a long-distance friendship develops between Hanff and Doel and also the other staff members; even Doel's wife corresponds with Hanff. In gratitude for their extraordinary service, Hanff begins sending small gifts: holiday packages and food parcels to compensate for post–war food shortages in Britain as she has learned from a British neighbour a way to send food from Denmark relatively inexpensively.

Cecily sneaks off a private letter to Helene, although asks her not to let Frank know, as she senses he might consider it to be improper and that he views her as his private correspondent. She says they all speculate as to what she is like, so requests a photo. In this way, Helene gets some detail as what Frank is like, sweet but married. Helene likewise sends Cecily a private letter. A non college graduate, she lives in and works from a brownstone studio apartment, editing and writing scripts.

Correspondence between Helene and Frank includes discussions about topics as diverse as the sermons of John Donne, how to make Yorkshire pudding, the Brooklyn Dodgers and the coronation of Elizabeth II. As time goes on, as they get to know one another, he senses which books that come in would interest her.

Helene gets a break, writing scripts for a TV series. At the same time, Frank is travelling around England to old estates for sale, seeking books for their shop. Helene's friend Maxine, who gets a role in a theatre in London, pops into Marks & Co. Although she does not meet any of the people Helene mentioned, she is able to describe it in detail. Later, when the show closes, she gifts nylons to the ladies of the book shop.

Hanff intends to visit London and meet her bookseller friends but has to postpone her plans. Firstly, she has to have extensive dental work. Then, Helene and other tenants get evicted, so she is forced to move to another building. In January 1969, she receives word that Doel has died and the bookshop has closed.

She finally visits Charing Cross Road and the vacant shop in the summer of 1971. The last scene of the film shows Helene standing in the doorway and saying, "Here I am, Frankie; I finally made it."

== Cast ==
- Anne Bancroft as Helene Hanff
- Anthony Hopkins as Frank Doel
- Judi Dench as Nora Doel
- Jean De Baer as Maxine Bellamy
- Maurice Denham as George Martin
- Eleanor David as Cecily Farr
- Mercedes Ruehl as Kay
- Daniel Gerroll as Brian
- Wendy Morgan as Megan Wells
- Ian McNeice as Bill Humphries
- J. Smith-Cameron as Ginny
- Tom Isbell as Ed
- Connie Booth as The Lady from Delaware
- Ronn Carroll as Businessman on Plane

== Production ==
The film was shot on location in London and New York City. London settings include Buckingham Palace, Soho Square, Trafalgar Square, St James's, Westminster, Griffin Park in Brentford standing in for White Hart Lane in Tottenham and suburban Richmond. Manhattan settings include Central Park, Madison Avenue, and Saint Thomas Church. Interiors were filmed at Lee International Studios and Shepperton Studios in Surrey.

== Reception ==
=== Critical response ===
Variety described it as "an appealing film on several counts, one of the most notable being Anne Bancroft's fantastic performance in the leading role... [She] brings Helene Hanff alive in all her dimensions, in the process creating one of her most memorable characterizations."

In his Chicago Tribune review, Gene Siskel wrote: "Years ago, 84 Charing Cross Road would have been called a 'woman's picture' or a 'perfect matinee.' But it's that and more. It should be irresistible to anyone able to appreciate the goodness of its spirit and its spirited characters."

Roger Ebert of the Chicago Sun-Times observed, "The film is based on a hit London and New York play, which was based on a best-selling book. Given the thin and unlikely subject matter, that already is a series of miracles. And yet there are people who are pushovers for this material. I should know. I read the book and I saw the play and now I am reviewing the movie, and I still don't think the basic idea is sound... Miss Fiske... was the librarian at the Urbana Free Library when I was growing up... She never had to talk to me about the love of books because she simply exuded it and I absorbed it. She would have loved this movie. Sitting next to her, I suspect, I would have loved it, too. But Miss Fiske is gone now, and I found it pretty slow-going on my own."

Vincent Canby for The New York Times gave 84 Charing Cross Road a less favourable review, citing it as "a movie guaranteed to put all teeth on edge . . . a movie of such unrelieved genteelness that it makes one long to head for Schrafft's for a double-gin martini, straight up, and a stack of cinnamon toast from which the crusts have been removed."

=== Box office ===
In its opening weekend in the U.S. the film grossed $24,350 at one theater. The total U.S. box office was $1,083,486.

=== Awards and nominations ===
Anne Bancroft won the BAFTA Award for Best Actress in a Leading Role. Judi Dench was nominated for the BAFTA Award for Best Actress in a Supporting Role, and Hugh Whitemore for BAFTA Award for Best Adapted Screenplay. At the 15th Moscow International Film Festival, Anthony Hopkins was named Best Actor, and David Hugh Jones was nominated for the Golden Prize for his direction. Whitemore and Helene Hanff shared the first USC Scripter Award for their contributions to the screenplay.
