= Marks & Co =

Bookseller in London

Coordinates: 51°30′49″N 0°7′45″W

Marks & Co was an antiquarian bookshop at 84 Charing Cross Road, London.

The shop was founded in the 1920s by Benjamin Marks and Mark Cohen. Cohen was persuaded to allow his name to be abbreviated in the company's name. A book of correspondence between Helene Hanff and Frank Doel, together with other members of the staff between 1949 and 1968, published by Hanff as 84 Charing Cross Road, was later made into a stage play, television play and BAFTA-winning film.

Marks & Co closed in 1970.

== Famous connections ==
The company built an undisputed reputation as one of the best antiquarian booksellers in all of Great Britain and Ireland in the mid 1900s. It boasted a number of prominent customers, including Charlie Chaplin, George Bernard Shaw, Lord Alanbrooke, and Michael Foot, as well as British and European royalty, and public institutions such as universities and the British Museum.

Benjamin Marks' son, Leo Marks, became a prominent member of the wartime organisation, Special Operations Executive, specialising in codes. His interest in the subject had been sparked by his father's use of book pricing codes.

== Book ring ==
During the 1930s, Marks & Co were members of a then-secret and illegal "book ring", whereby a group of London book dealers declined to bid against each other at auctions. Instead, they would steal value from the auction house and the book's owner when one of them would buy at prices kept low by the lack of competition, then the ring would bid privately between themselves and the surplus would be shared amongst the unsuccessful ring members. The successful ring member would then sell the book, at a profit, from their store.

When the secrecy surrounding the bidding ring was broken, a scandal was threatened to be raised in the British House of Commons. In order to avoid this, an undertaking was signed, at the offices of the Times Literary Supplement, by the ring's members to bring the practice ("if it existed") to an end.
