= Frank Doel =

British antiquarian bookseller (1908–1968)

Frank Percy Doel (14 July 1908 – 22 December 1968) was a British antiquarian bookseller for Marks & Co in London who achieved posthumous fame as the recipient of a series of witty letters from American author Helene Hanff, to which he scrupulously, and at first very formally, replied. The shop in which he worked was Marks & Company at 84 Charing Cross Road, the title of a bestselling 1970 book written by Hanff which became a cult classic, a 1981 stage play, and a 1987 film starring Anthony Hopkins as Doel and Anne Bancroft as Hanff.

== Early life ==
Doel was born in Wallasey, Cheshire, and moved from there to Harringay, London, when he was eight years old. From 1919 to 1924, Doel was educated at Hornsey County Grammar School, a co-educational school also attended by his elder brother. On leaving school, Doel started his first, and only, job with Marks & Co, an antiquarian bookshop, located at 84 Charing Cross Road, London. Always known as "young Frank", he learnt the trade from his employers Ben Marks and Mark Cohen.

== Family life ==
Doel was twice married. In 1936 he married Mary Price, and their daughter, Sheila, was born in 1939. Mary died in 1945. In 1947 Doel married Nora Morrison and a second daughter, Mary, was born in 1948.

== War service ==
Doel served during World War II in the Middle East as a private in the RAOC.

== Character ==
Doel travelled the country and was well regarded wherever he went. Mark Cohen would describe him as the shop's 'anchor man'. Doel loved classical music and was, with his brother, a keen supporter of Tottenham Hotspur F.C.

== Social life ==
Doel had many good friends and colleagues in the antiquarian book trade and much of his and Nora's social life centred on the "Bibliomites", the Society of Antiquarian Booksellers Employees, of which he was a Committee Member.

Doel and his wife were friends with the Soviet double agent Peter Kroger and Kroger's wife (who were both later imprisoned for spying) because Kroger opened a rare bookshop near St Clement Danes's church as a cover for his activities. This friendship is mentioned in Helene Hanff's The Duchess of Bloomsbury Street, a sequel to 84, Charing Cross Road. Nora Doel describes a New Year's Eve at which Lona Cohen (aka Helen Kroger)

...arrived looking very exotic in a long black evening dress. 'Helen, you look like a Russian spy!' said Nora. And Helen laughed and Peter laughed and a few months later Nora picked up the morning paper and discovered that Helen and Peter Kroger were Russian spies.

== Later life ==
By the late 1960s Doel was running the business virtually single handed, Marks having died and Cohen too elderly to oversee day-to-day operations. Frank Doel died from peritonitis from a ruptured appendix on 22 December 1968 and his funeral was attended by almost the whole of London antiquarian book trade on New Year's Day 1969.

" It is with deep sorrow and regret we have to announce the death on the 22nd of December of MR. FRANK DOEL, who has been with us for over forty years. He will be greatly missed by us all and his many friends throughout the country. - Messrs. MARKS & CO., 84, Charing Cross Road, London, W.C.2.".

When Hanff belatedly heard of his death she wrote a short autobiographical book which became the classic 84, Charing Cross Road. The book was subsequently turned into a stage play and, in 1975, a BBC TV Play for Today with Anne Jackson and Frank Finlay. In 1987, a filmed version also appeared starring Anthony Hopkins and Anne Bancroft, 84 Charing Cross Road.
