= 84, Charing Cross Road =

1970 book

- Publisher: Grossman Publishers
- Publication date: 1970
- Publication place: New York
- ISBN: 9780670290734
- OCLC: 99564

84, Charing Cross Road is a 1970 non-fiction book by Helene Hanff. It is an epistolary memoir composed of letters from the twenty-year correspondence between the author and Frank Doel, chief buyer for Marks & Co antiquarian booksellers, and others, located at the eponymous address in London. It was later adapted into a 1975 television play, a 1976 radio drama, a 1981 stage play, and a 1987 film.

== Background ==
Hanff was in search of obscure classics and British literature titles that she had been unable to find in New York City when she noticed an ad for Marks & Co in the Saturday Review of Literature. She first contacted the shop in 1949 and it fell to Doel to fulfill her requests. In time, a long-distance friendship developed between the two and between Hanff and other staff members, as well, with an exchange of Christmas packages, birthday gifts and food parcels to help with the post-World War II food shortages in Britain. Their letters included discussions about topics as diverse as the sermons of John Donne, how to make Yorkshire Pudding, the Brooklyn Dodgers and the coronation of Elizabeth II. Hanff postponed visiting her English friends until too late; Doel died in December 1968 from peritonitis from a burst appendix, and the bookshop eventually closed in December 1970. Hanff did finally visit Charing Cross Road and the empty shop in the summer of 1971, a trip recorded in her 1973 book The Duchess of Bloomsbury Street.

== The shop's site today ==
The five-story building where Marks & Co. was located during the events of the book still exists (51°30′49″N 0°07′45″W). A circular brass plaque on a pilaster on the street frontage acknowledges the story and marks the site. The premises were occupied by a music and CD shop in the early 1990s, and later other retail outlets. In 2009 they housed a Med Kitchen restaurant; and now form part of a McDonald's restaurant. In New York, the apartment house at 305 East 72nd Street, near Second Avenue, Hanff’s home from 1956 and from where she wrote her later letters, has been renamed “Charing Cross House” in her honor.

== Bibliography ==
Partial list of the books that Helene Hanff ordered from Marks & Co. and mentioned in 84, Charing Cross Road (alphabetical order):

- Austen, Jane. Pride and Prejudice, (1813)
- Arkwright, Francis trans. Memoirs of the Duc de Saint-Simon
- Belloc, Hillaire. Essays.
- Catullus – Loeb Classics
- Chaucer, Geoffrey The Canterbury Tales translated by Hill, published by Longmans 1934)
- Delafield, E. M., Diary of a Provincial Lady
- Dobson, Austen ed. The Sir Roger De Coverley Papers
- Donne, John Sermons
- Elizabethan Poetry
- Grahame, Kenneth, The Wind in the Willows
- Greek New Testament
- Grolier Bible
- Hazlitt, William. Selected Essays Of William Hazlitt 1778 To 1830, Nonesuch Press edition.
- Horace – Loeb Classics
- Hunt, Leigh. Essays.
- Johnson, Samuel, On Shakespeare, 1908, Intro by Walter Raleigh
- Jonson, Ben. Timber
- Lamb, Charles. Essays of Elia, (1823).
- Landor, Walter Savage. Vol II of The Works and Life of Walter Savage Landor (1876) – Imaginary Conversations
- Latin Anglican New Testament
- Latin Vulgate Bible / Latin Vulgate New Testament
- Latin Vulgate Dictionary
- Leonard, R. M. ed. The Book-Lover's Anthology, (1911)
- Newman, John Henry. Discourses on the Scope and Nature of University Education. Addressed to the Catholics of Dublin – "The Idea of a University" (1852 and 1858)
- Pepys, Samuel. Pepys Diary – 4 Volume Braybrook ed. (1926, revised ed.)
- Plato's Four Socratic Dialogues, 1903
- Quiller-Couch, Arthur, The Oxford Book Of English Verse
- Quiller-Couch, Arthur, The Pilgrim's Way
- Quiller-Couch, Arthur, Oxford Book of English Prose
- Sappho – Loeb Classics
- St. John, Christopher Ed. Ellen Terry and Bernard Shaw : A Correspondence / The Shaw – Terry Letters : A Romantic Correspondence
- Sterne, Laurence, The Life and Opinions of Tristram Shandy, Gentleman, (1759)
- Stevenson, Robert Louis. Virginibus Puerisque
- de Tocqueville, Alexis Journey to America (1831–1832)
- Wyatt, Thomas. Poems of Thomas Wyatt
- Walton, Izaak and Charles Cotton. The Compleat Angler. (John Major's 2nd ed., 1824)
- Walton, Izaak. The Lives of – John Donne – Sir Henry Wotton – Richard Hooker – George Herbert & Robert Sanderson
- Woolf, Virginia, The Common Reader, 1932.

== Adaptations ==
=== Television ===
Hugh Whitemore adapted 84, Charing Cross Road for the BBC's Play for Today, a television anthology series. It was first broadcast on 4 November 1975, starring Frank Finlay and Anne Jackson.

=== Theatre ===
In 1981, James Roose-Evans adapted it for the stage and it was first produced at the Salisbury Playhouse with a cast headed by Rosemary Leach as Hanff and David Swift as Doel. It transferred to the West End, where it opened to universally ecstatic reviews. It toured nationally and was performed by Miriam Karlin in 1990 and later by Rula Lenska and Bill Gaunt. It returned to the Salisbury Playhouse in 2015, running 5–28 February with Clive Francis and Janie Dee in the lead roles. It was also performed at the Cambridge Arts Theatre in 2018 by Clive Francis and Stefanie Powers, before embarking on a UK tour.

After fifteen previews, the Broadway production opened to mixed reviews on 7 December 1982 at the Nederlander Theatre with Ellen Burstyn and Joseph Maher. It ran for 96 performances.

=== Radio ===
Virginia Browns adapted the story for BBC Radio drama, and it was broadcast on Radio 3 on 15 January 1976, with Margaret Robertson as Hanff and Lyndon Brook as Doel. The play was produced by Christopher Venning.

James Roose-Evans again adapted the play for a 1992 BBC radio production starring Frank Finlay, who had played Doel in the 1975 TV production, and Miriam Karlin and a 2007 production starring Gillian Anderson and Denis Lawson, broadcast on Christmas Day on BBC Radio 4.

=== Film ===
Whitemore returned to the project to write the screenplay for the 1987 film adaptation starring Anne Bancroft and Anthony Hopkins. The dramatis personae were expanded to include Hanff's Manhattan friends, the bookshop staff, and Doel's wife Nora, played by Judi Dench. Bancroft won the BAFTA Award for Best Actress in a Leading Role. Dench was nominated for the BAFTA Award for Best Actress in a Supporting Role and Whitemore for BAFTA Award for Best Adapted Screenplay.

=== Audiobook ===
Two unabridged audiobooks have been published; one was released by Little, Brown Audio on February 17, 2007, narrated by Juliet Stevenson and John Nettles. Another was released by Recorded Books, Inc. on July 1, 2017, narrated by Barbara Rosenblat, John Franklyn-Robbins, Jill Tanner, Christina Moore, Simon Prebble, Barbara Caruso, and Davina Porter.

== In popular culture ==
The Chinese-Hong Kong film Book of Love or Finding Mr. Right 2 (Chinese: 北京遇上西雅圖之不二情書) (2016) references, and is loosely inspired by the book.
