= Helene Hanff =

American dramatist

- Helene Hanff, 1990s
- Born: April 15, 1916; Philadelphia, Pennsylvania, US
- Died: April 9, 1997 (aged 80); New York City, US
- Occupations: Screenwriter, writer

Helene Hanff (April 15, 1916 – April 9, 1997) was an American writer born in Philadelphia, Pennsylvania. She is best known as the author of the book 84, Charing Cross Road, which became the basis for a stage play, television play, and film of the same name.

== Early life ==
She was born in 1916 to Miriam (born Levy) and Arthur Hanff. Her father had been a performer, but he settled down to sell shirts. However, it was said that he still liked the theatre, and he would swap shirts for a chance to get into a theater. Her family could not fund an expensive education, but Hanff won a scholarship to attend Temple University. She said that she was resigned to leaving after a year when the money was used up. She decided to teach herself, and she established a daily schedule of study. She had to abandon this when she realized that her family needed her to be a wage earner.

== Career ==
Helene Hanff's literary career saw her move from unproduced playwright to writer of some of the earliest television dramas to becoming a noted writer and personality in her own right, as a quintessential New Yorker. She wrote a memoir in 1961 called Underfoot in Show Business that chronicled her struggles as an ambitious young playwright trying to make it in the world of New York theatre in the 1940s and 1950s. She worked in publicists' offices and spent summers on the "straw hat circuit" along the East Coast, all the while writing one play after another. Her plays were admired by some of Broadway's leading producers, but somehow none of them ever made it to the stage, Hanff herself saying her plays specialized in "plotless charm."

When network television production geared up in New York City in the early 1950s, Hanff found a new career writing and editing scripts for many early television dramas. Chief among these was the Dumont Network series The Adventures of Ellery Queen. At the same time, she continued to try to get one of her plays produced on Broadway and not just be "one of the 999 out of 1,000 who didn't become Moss Hart." (In later editions of Underfoot, this reference was changed to Noël Coward.) The bulk of television production eventually moved to California, but Hanff chose to remain in New York. As her TV work dried up, she turned to writing for magazines and, eventually, to the books that made her reputation. In 1981, Hanff also appeared on the BBC's Desert Island Discs radio programme, in which she discussed her life and career along with her top choice of music which was Bach and her choice of luxury was Scrabble.

== 84, Charing Cross Road ==
The epistolary work 84, Charing Cross Road was first published in 1970. It chronicles Hanff's 20 years of correspondence, primarily with Frank Doel, the chief buyer for Marks & Co, a London bookshop. She depended on the bookshop—and on Doel—for the obscure classics and British literature titles that fueled her passion for self-education. She became intimately involved in the lives of the shop's staff, sending them food parcels during Britain's postwar shortages and sharing with them details of her life in Manhattan.

Due to financial difficulties and an aversion to travel, she put off visiting her English friends until too late; Doel died in December 1968 from peritonitis from a burst appendix, and the bookshop eventually closed. Hanff did finally visit Charing Cross Road and the empty but still-standing shop in the summer of 1971, a trip recorded in her 1973 book The Duchess of Bloomsbury Street. In Duchess, Hanff describes her visits with friends and fans to various locations and places of literary and historical interest in London and Southern England. This trip was a highlight of her life – her modesty and sense of humor are evident as she talks about her love of London and the friends who were so devoted to her because of 84, Charing Cross Road, including Frank Doel's wife Nora and his daughter Sheila, by his first wife Mary Price.

In the 1987 film adaptation 84 Charing Cross Road, Hanff was played by Anne Bancroft, with Anthony Hopkins playing Frank Doel. Anne Jackson had earlier played Hanff and Frank Finlay had played Doel in a 1975 adaptation of the book for British television. Ellen Burstyn recreated the role on Broadway in 1982 at the Nederlander Theater in New York City. Elaine Stritch also played Helene Hanff in a television adaptation of 84, Charing Cross Road. A memorial plaque stands at the McDonald's now in its location, reading "84 / CHARING CROSS ROAD / THE BOOKSELLERS / MARKS & CO. / WERE ON THIS SITE WHICH / BECAME WORLD RENOWNED / THROUGH THE BOOK BY / HELENE HANFF".

== Additional books ==
Hanff later put to good use her obsession with British scholar Sir Arthur Quiller-Couch in a book called Q's Legacy (1985). The book serves as background to 84 and also recounts the aftermath of Duchess. Other books include Apple of My Eye (1977 and updated in 1988), an idiosyncratic guide to New York City; Letter from New York (1992), which reprinted the five-minute talks that she gave each month on the BBC's Woman's Hour radio broadcasts between 1978 and 1984; and Underfoot in Show Business (1961, reissued 1989). Underfoot in Show Business was adapted as a stage play by Charles Leipart and premiered in 2008 at the Devonshire Theatre in Eastbourne, UK, directed by David Giles. It was also adapted by Marcy Kahan into a radio drama directed by Sally Avens, first broadcast on BBC Radio 4 in 2025.

== Personal life ==
Hanff never married. In the 1987 84 Charing Cross Road movie, a photo of a US serviceman is shown in her apartment during World War II, a portrait at which she smiles fondly, suggesting to the viewer that Hanff remained unmarried owing to this naval officer's death. No such person is mentioned in her autobiographical Underfoot, and none of her writings suggests that she ever had any lasting or even short-term romantic relationship with any person. However, writer Al Senter claimed that she mentioned a long affair with an unnamed 'prominent American' during a conversation with one of the co-founders of Marks and Co, and one obituary of her asserted that 'there were romances'.

== Death and legacy ==
Hanff died from diabetes six days before her 81st birthday in 1997 in New York City. The apartment building where she lived at 305 E. 72nd Street has been named "Charing Cross House" in her honor. A bronze plaque next to the front door commemorates her residence and authorship of the book. In London, a bronze plaque on the site of the original building commemorates the bookshop at 84, Charing Cross Road.

Stephen R. Pastore published a biography, Helene Hanff: A Life, in 2011 based on interviews that he had conducted with her.
