= The Lion (Kessel novel) =

1958 novel by Joseph Kessel

Le Lion
- 1959 French edition
- Author: Joseph Kessel
- Original title: Le Lion
- Translator: Peter Green
- Language: French
- Publisher: Gallimard-Jeunesse
- Publication date: 1958
- Publication place: France
- Media type: Print (Hardback & Paperback)
- Pages: 280 pp
- ISBN: 978-2-07-051344-4
- OCLC: 39011521

The Lion (French: Le Lion) is a 1958 novel by French author Joseph Kessel about a girl and her lion.

The novel was translated into English by Peter Green and was made into a film starring William Holden in 1962.

== Plot summary ==
Patricia has a rare gift to communicate with animals, and thinks she can control everything. She is popular with both animals and people. The story is narrated through a French man on a visit to Kenya. The plot of the story revolves around the friendship between Patricia and a lion called King, whom Patricia raised since he was a cub. Ouriounga, a teenage Maasai, who wishes to marry Patricia, decides to prove his worth by killing a lion to gain her respect, as is custom in his tribe. However the lion he chooses is King. Patricia's father shoots King in order to protect Ouriounga from certain death. With her idealistic view of the African savanna crushed, Patricia finally gives in to everyone's demands and leaves with the narrator to attend a boarding school in Nairobi.

== Film adaption ==
Irene and Louis Kamp adapted the novel for the screenplay of a 1962 movie of the same title starring William Holden, Trevor Howard, Capucine, and the young Pamela Franklin as Tina (Patricia of the novel).

Directed by cinematographer Jack Cardiff and filmed on location in East Africa, it was made for a budget of $4,345,000 - a costly film for its time. Film critic Leonard Maltin found the beautiful scenery to be "far better than the melodrama."

It earned rentals in North America of $1.3 million.
