= Force of Arms =

1951 film by Michael Curtiz

- Directed by: Michael Curtiz
- Written by: Orin Jannings; Richard Tregaskis (story)
- Produced by: Anthony Veiller
- Starring: William Holden; Nancy Olson
- Cinematography: Ted D. McCord
- Edited by: Owen Marks
- Music by: Max Steiner
- Production company: Warner Bros. Pictures
- Distributed by: Warner Bros. Pictures
- Release date: August 13, 1951
- Running time: 98-105 minutes
- Country: United States
- Language: English
- Box office: $1.2 million (US rentals)

Force of Arms (reissued as A Girl for Joe) is a 1951 romantic war drama film directed by Michael Curtiz and starring William Holden, Nancy Olson and Frank Lovejoy. It is the third of four films in 1950 and 1951 to include both Holden and Olson in prominent roles; the others are Sunset Boulevard, Union Station and Submarine Command.

The film is set in the Italian campaign of World War II and its plot involves an American infantryman and Women's Army Corps officer who fall in love.

== Plot ==
The American 36th Infantry Division is fighting bitterly for every hill in the Allied advance on Rome during the Italian campaign of World War II. After hard combat in the Battle of San Pietro in mid-December 1943, the infantrymen are awarded five days of needed rest. Spurning reverie in town, battle-fatigued sergeant Joe "Pete" Peterson wanders in the night in a cemetery filled with fresh crosses. He runs into attractive WAC lieutenant Eleanor "Ellie" MacKay but is treated coolly. Pete's friend and commanding officer Major Blackford informs him that Pete has been granted a battlefield commission and promoted to second lieutenant.

When Sergeant McFee becomes upset because he has not received a letter from his wife in weeks, Pete takes him to the post office to investigate and finds Ellie working there. Ellie offers to buy Pete a drink to celebrate his promotion, but she again rejects his advances, revealing that she almost married a soldier who was killed and does not want to risk falling in love again. However, when the division's leave is cut short, her resistance fails and they plan to marry during his next leave.

Blackford assigns Pete and his platoon to destroy a German roadblock. After the mission, Pete spots two deadly German 88 antitank guns commanding the road on which American Sherman tanks are advancing. When one of his men urges him to attack the guns, he becomes overly cautious, thinking of Ellie. He orders an artillery strike before realizing that Blackford is directing the tank column from its lead. He helplessly watches the 88s destroy Blackford's tank before he is wounded by an artillery barrage, knocking him unconscious.

Pete awakens and blames himself for Blackford's death, feeling guilty about thinking only of his own survival, Pete sinks into a depression, unwilling to see anyone, but a visit from Ellie changes his mood. With a three-day leave before being returned to a replacement depot, safely out of combat, Pete takes Ellie to the countryside and get married. However, Pete's guilt compels him to rejoin his unit. Ellie knows that she cannot stop him, but she will be there when he returns. Months pass and she discovers that she is pregnant, which means a discharge from the army and repatriation at home, but she resists.

Pete is trapped in tough house-to-house combat, unaware that his unit has been ordered to retreat. He is listed as missing and presumed dead. Unwilling to accept that uncertainty, Ellie searches everywhere for him without success. When the Allies occupy Rome, she finally finds him there. He had been taken as a prisoner but was freed when the Germans abandoned the city intact.

== Cast ==
- William Holden as Sergeant/Lieutenant Joe "Pete" Peterson
- Nancy Olson as Lieutenant Eleanor MacKay
- Frank Lovejoy as Major Blackford
- Gene Evans as Sergeant Smiley "Mac" McFee
- Dick Wesson as Kleiner, one of Pete's men
- Paul Picerni as Sheridan
- Katherine Warren as Major Waldron
- Ron Hagerthy as Minto

== Reception ==
In a contemporary review for The New York Times, critic A. H. Weiler called the film "a forceful amalgam of ruggedness and romance" and wrote: "[T]he drama, which treats of two young people, bone-tired and soul-sick of the war in which they are pawns, is honest romance and cynicism made adult, moving and palatable by an intelligent cast, director, writers and producer. ... [T]hey have created people who talk, think and feel like individuals responding to genuine emotions."

== See also ==
- List of American films of 1951
