= Smith! =

1969 film by Michael O'Herlihy

- Directed by: Michael O'Herlihy
- Screenplay by: Louis Pelletier
- Based on: Breaking Smith's Quarter Horse by Paul St. Pierre
- Produced by: Bill Anderson
- Starring: Glenn Ford; Nancy Olson; Dean Jagger; Keenan Wynn; Warren Oates
- Cinematography: Robert C. Moreno
- Edited by: Robert Stafford
- Music by: Robert F. Brunner
- Color process: Technicolor
- Production company: Walt Disney Productions
- Distributed by: Buena Vista Distribution
- Release date: March 21, 1969
- Running time: 102 minutes
- Country: United States
- Language: English
- Box office: $1.3 million (US/ Canada rentals)

Smith! is a 1969 American neo-Western film made by Walt Disney Productions, directed by Michael O'Herlihy and stars Glenn Ford, Nancy Olson, Dean Jagger, Keenan Wynn, and Warren Oates.

== Plot ==
Native American Jimmyboy flees to a ranch owned by Smith, a white man raised by a Native American. Jimmyboy has been accused of a crime by a white man and fears he will not receive a fair trial. Smith helps Jimmyboy deal with a cruel sheriff and persuades him to surrender to the local authorities, promising him he will act as a defense witness during court proceedings.

== Cast ==
- Glenn Ford as Smith
- Nancy Olson as Norah Smith
- Dean Jagger as Judge Brown
- Keenan Wynn as Vince Heber
- Warren Oates as Walter Charlie
- Chief Dan George as Ol' Antoine
- Frank Ramírez as Gabriel Jimmyboy
- John Randolph as Mr. Edwards
- Christopher Shea as Alpie
- Roger Ewing as Donald Maxwell
- Jay Silverheels as McDonald Lasheway
- James Westerfield as Sheriff
- Fred Aldrich as Restaurant Patron (uncredited)
- William Bryant as Corporal/Court Bailiff (uncredited)
- Melanie Griffith as Extra (uncredited)
- Gregg Palmer as Sergeant, Court Bailiff (uncredited)

== Music ==
The film's theme song, "The Ballad of Smith and Gabriel Jimmyboy", was written and sung by Bobby Russell.

== See also ==
- List of American films of 1969
