= Canadian Pacific (film) =

1949 film

- Theatrical release poster
- Directed by: Edwin L. Marin
- Written by: Jack DeWitt; Kenneth Gamet
- Produced by: Nat Holt
- Starring: Randolph Scott; Jane Wyatt; J. Carrol Naish
- Cinematography: Fred Jackman Jr.
- Edited by: Philip Martin
- Music by: Dimitri Tiomkin
- Production company: Nat Holt Productions
- Distributed by: 20th Century Fox
- Release date: May 19, 1949 (New York City)
- Running time: 95 minutes
- Country: United States
- Language: English

Canadian Pacific is a 1949 American historical Western film, directed by Edwin L. Marin and starring Randolph Scott and Jane Wyatt. Filmed in Cinecolor on location in the Canadian Rockies in Banff National Park, Morley Indian Reserve in Alberta, and Yoho National Park in British Columbia, it is a story about the building of the Canadian Pacific Railway.

== Plot ==
Tom Andrews is a surveyor involved in the building of the titular Canadian railroad, which is stalled by the Rocky Mountains. While he maps a route through the mountains, Andrews is shot at by Dirk Rourke, a fur trader, and his accomplice, Cagle. When Andrews returns to the construction camp, he sees Cagle working there and attacks him. Dr Edith Cabot intervenes as she is a pacifist and disapproves of violence.

Andrews heads for Calgary to see his girlfriend, Cecille Gautier. Andrews and Cecille's father attend a meeting at which Rourke campaigns against the railway by claiming that it will mean the end of trade in the area. Andrews tries to convince the crowd that the railway will benefit them and that Rourke objects only because it will end his business monopoly. He and Rourke get into a fist fight, which is broken up by Père Lacombe. To keep the peace and because Cecille's father sides with Rourke, Andrews decides to return to work on the railway. Cecille does not understand and is upset at his intention to spend another year away, and so she breaks their engagement.

At the camp, Dynamite Dawson tells Andrews of his suspicion that Indians have been stealing dynamite. Andrews later finds several cases of dynamite buried at an Indian village. The chief says that young braves had been paid by a white man to steal them. Back at the camp, Cagle and Rourke shoot at one of the cases as Andrews unloads them. Andrews is seriously injured in the resulting explosion. On board a train back to the base hospital, Dr Cabot transfuses her own blood to save Andrews's life.

Meanwhile, back at the ranch, Cecille overhears Rourke, her father, and others plotting to stop the railway by inciting the Indians to cause trouble. When she objects, her father threatens to disown her. Suspecting Rourke of having caused the explosion that injured Andrews, she decides to join him at the hospital but is dissuaded by Dynamite, who persuades her to return home to gather evidence and to pass it on to him.

Saboteurs cause a series of explosions, which closes down railway construction for the winter. By the spring, Andrews has recovered and wooed Edith. Hearing of trouble at the camp, Andrews prepares to return, but Edith persuades him not to wear a gun. Rourke has stirred up the Indians and established a saloon and gambling hall at the camp. When a man is shot at the saloon, Edith goes to help but is too late. Andrews straps on his guns again and closes the saloon.

Cecille arrives and announces that Rourke and the Indians are about to attack. Dynamite rides off to get reinforcements while the others take refuge in the hospital car.

Cecille's injured father is brought in and tells them that they are considerably outnumbered. Andrews goes after Rourke and Cagle and, as the Indians prepare for a final battle, shoots Cagle. Rourke is killed by a falling branch from a tree, which had been set on fire as a signal to the Indians. Although the Indians attack, they are driven off by reinforcements, which arrive by train at the last moment. Later, the Indian chief walks into the camp and sues for peace.

Dismayed by the violence that she has experienced in the west, Edith boards a train for the east. Cecille looks on as Andrews boards the train as it moves off, but after saying goodbye to Edith, he jumps off and returns to her. Andrews and Cecile spend their honeymoon camping at Cecille's favorite lake, Lake Louise.

== Cast ==
- Randolph Scott as Tom Andrews
- Jane Wyatt as Dr. Edith Cabot
- J. Carrol Naish as Dynamite Dawson
- Victor Jory as Dirk Rourke
- Nancy Olson as Cecille Gautier
- Robert Barrat as Cornelius Van Horne
- Walter Sande as Mike Brannigan
- Grandon Rhodes as Dr. Mason
- Don Haggerty as Cagle
- John Parrish as Mr. Gautier
- Mary Kent as Mrs. Gautier
- John Hamilton as Pere Lacombe
- Howard Negley as Mallis
- Dick Wessel as Bailey
