= Nancy Olson =

American actress (born 1928)

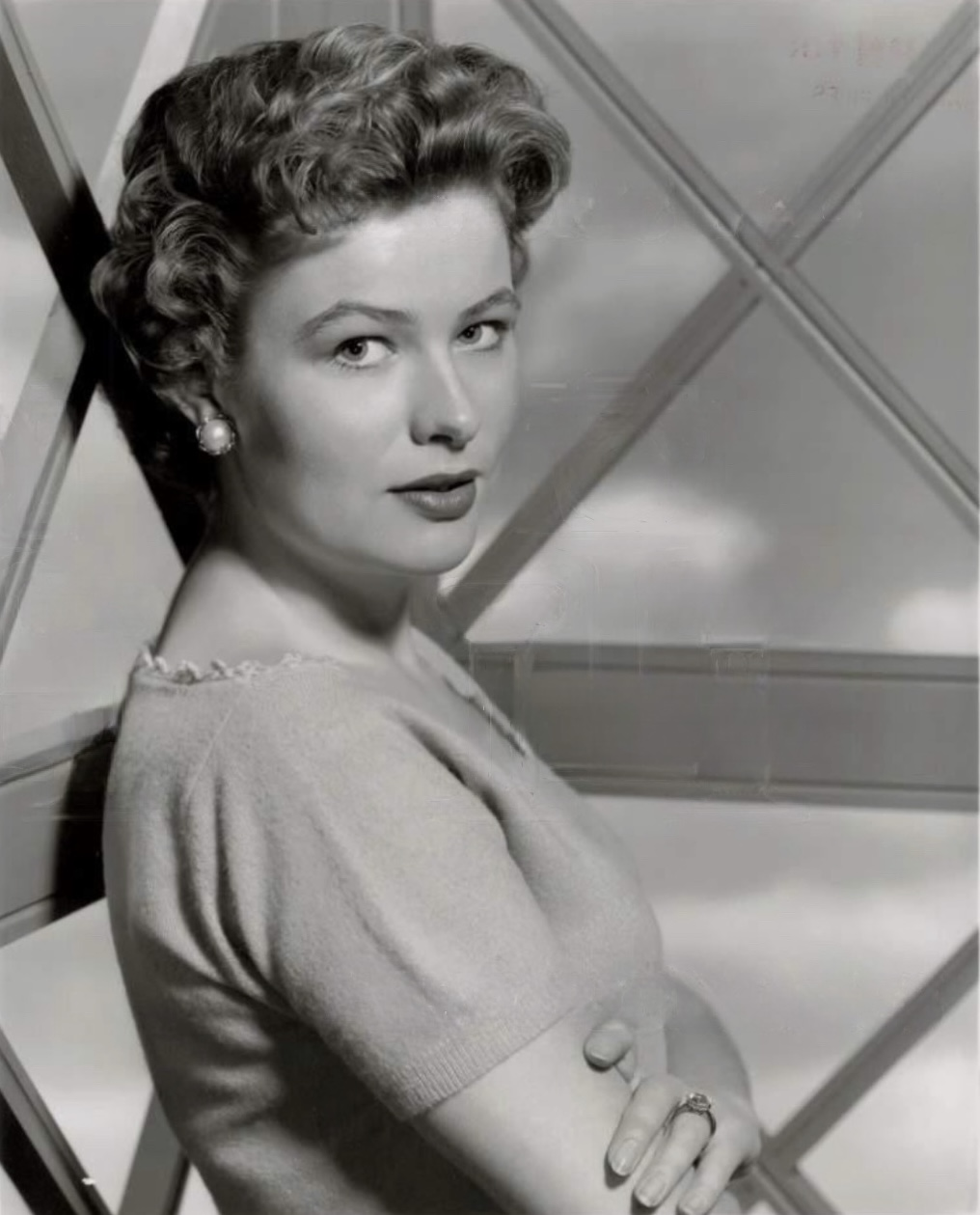
- Olson in 1955
- Born: Nancy Ann Olson; July 14, 1928 (age 98); Milwaukee, Wisconsin, U.S.
- Other name: Nancy Livingston
- Occupation: Actress
- Years active: 1948–2014
- Spouses: Alan Jay Lerner (m. 1950; div. 1957) Alan W. Livingston (m. 1962; died 2009)
- Children: 3

Nancy Ann Olson (born July 14, 1928) is an American retired actress. She made her film debut Canadian Pacific (1949), before gaining prominence as Betty Schaefer in Billy Wilder's Sunset Boulevard (1950), for which she earned a nomination for the Academy Award for Best Supporting Actress. She later co-starred with William Holden in three more films Union Station (1950), Force of Arms (1951), and Submarine Command (1951).

Olson requested to be released from her contract with Paramount after marrying lyricist and playwright Alan Jay Lerner, whose musical My Fair Lady was dedicated to her. She later reached a new generation of audiences through several Walt Disney productions, including Pollyanna (1960) The Absent-Minded Professor (1961) and its sequel, Son of Flubber (1963), and appeared in disaster film Airport 1975 (1974) which reunited her with her Sunset Boulevard co-star Gloria Swanson. She later retired from acting in the mid-1980s, with only rare screen appearances afterward. Olson is the earliest surviving Academy Award-nominee and one of the last surviving stars of the Golden Age of Hollywood.

== Early life ==
Olson was born in Milwaukee, Wisconsin, on July 14, 1928, and raised there, along with her brother, David. Her parents were Evelyn Bertha (née Bergstrom), who was of Swedish descent, and Henry John Olson, a physician of Norwegian descent.

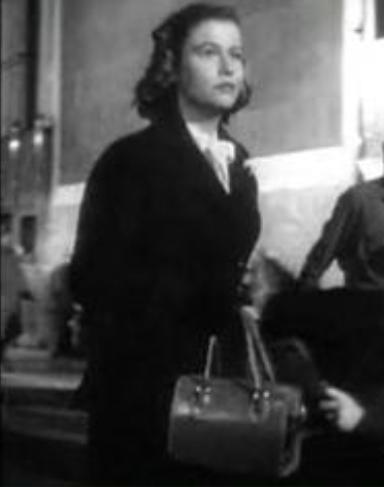
Union Station (1950)

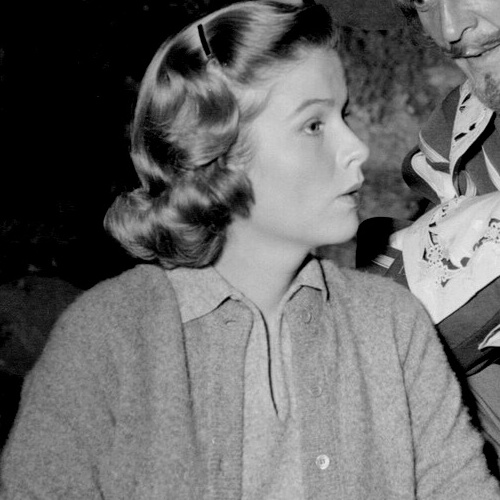
Olson in a 1956 Ford Star Jubilee TV special

Olson's elementary and secondary education was in Milwaukee schools. When her family moved to California, she transferred to UCLA after a year at the University of Wisconsin. Her performance in a play at UCLA attracted the attention of a talent scout who had attended to observe the male lead.

== Career ==
Olson was signed to a film contract by Paramount Pictures in 1948, and after a few supporting roles, producers began to consider her for more prominent parts. She was up for the role of Delilah in Cecil B. DeMille's film Samson and Delilah (1949), for which Olson later said she was not suited. She was passed over in favor of Hedy Lamarr.

Her first big role came in Canadian Pacific (also 1949) with Randolph Scott, then Billy Wilder cast her for his upcoming project. In Sunset Boulevard (1950), she played Betty Schaefer, for which she gained an Academy Award nomination for Best Supporting Actress. Her pairing with William Holden was considered a success, and she appeared with him in three other films (Union Station, Force of Arms, and Submarine Command, the second and third released the following year), but none repeated their success in Sunset Boulevard.

Olson's success in Sunset Boulevard also led to her being cast in the September 15, 1950, episode of the radio program Dimension X, titled "Hello Tomorrow".

Her other film credits include several films for Warner Bros., such as Big Jim McLain (1952), So Big (1953), and Battle Cry (1955).

Olson moved to New York City in the late 1950s and appeared on Broadway in three plays; The Tunnel of Love, Send Me No Flowers, and Mary, Mary.

Olson made several appearances in films for the Walt Disney studio. The Absent-Minded Professor (1961) and Son of Flubber (1963) paired her with Fred MacMurray and were popular with movie-goers. She also appeared alongside Hayley Mills in Pollyanna (1960), Glenn Ford in Smith! (1969), and Dean Jones in Snowball Express (1972).

Throughout the 1960s and 1970s, Olson did guest roles on television. Olson guest-starred on the television series The Big Valley playing Ron Howard's mother in the December 1, 1965, episode titled "Night of the Wolf". Olson is the only guest starring on The Big Valley to marry the character Nick Barkley.

Olson has been retired since the mid-1980s, although she made a brief, uncredited appearance in Flubber, the 1997 remake of The Absent-Minded Professor, and Dumbbells (2014).

In 2022, Olson released a memoir, A Front Row Seat: An Intimate Look at Broadway, Hollywood, and the Age of Glamour.

== Personal life ==
In 1950, Olson became the third wife of lyricist Alan Jay Lerner. They had two daughters, Liza and Jennifer. They divorced in 1957.

In 1962, she married long-time Capitol Records executive Alan W. Livingston, best known for creating Bozo the Clown and for signing The Beatles, Frank Sinatra, Judy Garland, and others to Capitol. He died in 2009; they had one son, Christopher.

== Filmography ==
=== Film ===
| Year | Title | Role | Notes |
|---|---|---|---|
| 1949 | Canadian Pacific | Cecille Gautier | |
| 1950 | Sunset Boulevard | Betty Schaefer | Nominated for Academy Award for Best Supporting Actress |
| 1950 | Union Station | Joyce Willecombe | |
| 1950 | Mr. Music | Katherine Holbrook | |
| 1951 | Force of Arms | Lieutenant Eleanor MacKay | |
| 1951 | Submarine Command | Carol | |
| 1952 | Big Jim McLain | Nancy Vallon | |
| 1953 | So Big | Dallas O'Mara | |
| 1954 | The Boy from Oklahoma | Katie Brannigan | |
| 1955 | Battle Cry | Mrs. Pat Rogers | |
| 1960 | Pollyanna | Nancy Furman | |
| 1961 | The Absent-Minded Professor | Betsy Carlisle | |
| 1963 | Son of Flubber | Elizabeth "Betsy" Brainard | |
| 1969 | Smith! | Norah Smith | |
| 1972 | Snowball Express | Sue Baxter | |
| 1974 | Airport 1975 | Mrs. Abbott | |
| 1982 | Making Love | Christine | |
| 1987 | Sparky's Magic Piano | voice | Video |
| 1997 | Flubber | Ford Secretary | |
| 2014 | Dumbbells | Bianca Cummings | |

=== Television ===
| Year | Title | Role | Notes |
|---|---|---|---|
| 1954 | Ford Theatre | Kitty O'Dare | episode: "For the Love of Kitty" |
| 1954 | Lux Video Theatre | Lisa | episode: "Spent in Silence" |
| 1954 | The Best of Broadway | Gwen Cavendish | episode: "The Royal Family" |
| 1955 | Producers' Showcase | Peggy Day | episode: "The Woman" |
| 1956 | Ford Star Jubilee | Judith | episode: "High Tor" |
| 1958 | The United States Steel Hour | Joyce Richmond | episode: "Second Chance" |
| 1958 | General Electric Theater | Judith Gay | episode: "The Last Rodeo" |
| 1959 | Alfred Hitchcock Presents | Jan Manning | Season 4 Episode 17: "Total Loss" |
| 1960 | Startime | Peggy Thomas | episode: "The Greatest Man Alive" |
| 1961 | Alcoa Premiere | Amber Baring | episode: "Family Outing" |
| 1963 | Channing | Mrs. Landon | episode: "Collision Course" |
| 1965 | The Big Valley | Julia Jenkins | episode: "Night of the Wolf" |
| 1971 | The Name of the Game | Ann Latham | episode: "Beware of the Watchdog" |
| 1972 | Gunsmoke | Henrietta Donavan | episode: "Yankton" |
| 1972 | Police Surgeon | Judge | episode: "Death Holds the Scale" |
| 1973 | Love Story | Mrs. Ross | episode: "Mirabelle's Summer" |
| 1974 | Banacek | Louise Merrick | episode: "Now You See Me, Now You Don't" |
| 1975 | The Streets of San Francisco | Jeannie Morris | episode: "Web of Lies" |
| 1976 | Kingston: Confidential | Jessica Frazier | TV series |
| 1977 | Barnaby Jones | Thelma Thompson | episode: "Testament of Power" |
| 1984 | Paper Dolls | Marjorie Harper | Main role, 13 episodes |
| 2010 | Big Love | Katherine | episode: "Strange Bedfellows" |
