= My First Forty Years =

- Italian theatrical release poster
- Directed by: Carlo Vanzina
- Written by: Carlo Vanzina; Enrico Vanzina
- Produced by: Mario Cecchi Gori; Vittorio Cecchi Gori
- Starring: Carol Alt; Elliott Gould; Jean Rochefort; Pierre Cosso; Massimo Venturiello; Capucine
- Cinematography: Luigi Kuveiller
- Edited by: Jacques Gaillard; Ruggero Mastroianni
- Music by: Umberto Smaila
- Production companies: C.G. Silver Film; Rete Italia
- Distributed by: Columbia Pictures Italia
- Release date: 1987
- Language: Italian

My First Forty Years (Italian: I miei primi 40 anni, also known as My Wonderful Life) is a 1987 Italian drama film directed by Carlo Vanzina and starring Carol Alt, Elliott Gould and Jean Rochefort. It is loosely based on the autobiography of Marina Ripa Di Meana.

== Plot ==
Italy late 1980s. Determined not to remain an unknown woman, Marina gives rise to fame going from one room to another bed, from one scandal to another. She married a penniless duke then loves a journalist, an artist and a politician.

== Cast ==
- Carol Alt as Marina Caracciolo
- Elliott Gould as Nino Ranuzzi
- Jean Rochefort as Prince Riccio
- Pierre Cosso as Duke Massimiliano Caracciolo Villalta
- Capucine as Princess Caracciolo Villalta
- Teo Teocoli as Franco Bonetti
- Isabel Russinova as Doris Caetani
- Paola Quattrini as Marina's Mother
- Riccardo Garrone as Marina's Father
- Sebastiano Somma as Rodolfo Merisi
- Massimo Venturiello as Roberto D'Angelo
- Giuseppe Pambieri as Carlo Donati Dadda
- Martine Brochard as Marquise Caetani
- Carlo Monni as The Proprietor
