= Reveille with Beverly =

1943 film by Charles Barton

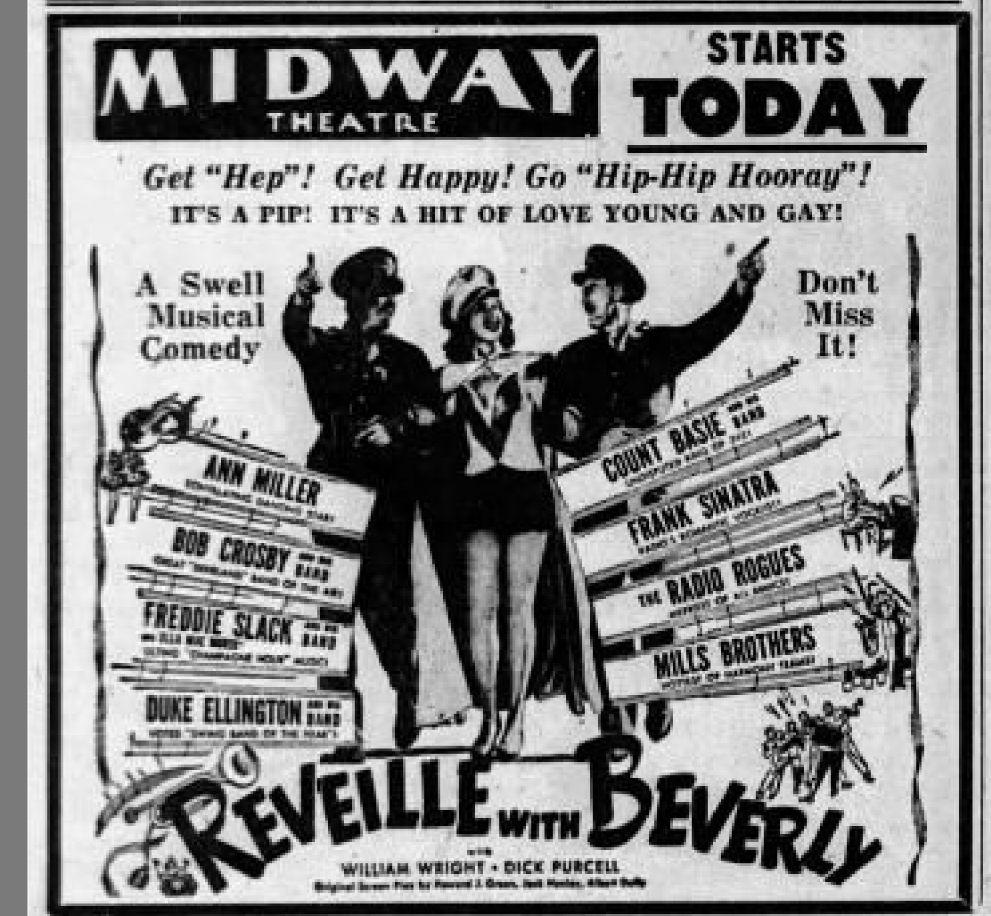
- Newspaper advertisement
- Directed by: Charles Barton
- Written by: Howard J. Green; Jack Henley; Albert Duffy
- Based on: Reveille with Beverly; 1941-44 radio show by Jean Ruth
- Produced by: Sam White
- Starring: Ann Miller; William Wright; Dick Purcell
- Cinematography: Philip Tannura
- Edited by: James Sweeney
- Music by: John Leipold
- Production company: Columbia Pictures
- Distributed by: Columbia Pictures Corporation
- Release date: February 4, 1943
- Running time: 78 minutes
- Country: United States
- Language: English
- Budget: $40,000 (estimated)
- Box office: $2,100,000 (USA)

Reveille with Beverly is a 1943 American musical film starring Ann Miller, Franklin Pangborn, and Larry Parks, directed by Charles Barton, released by Columbia Pictures, and based on the Reveille with Beverly radio show hosted by Jean Ruth. It is also the name of the subsequent soundtrack album.

The film featured a number of notable guest appearances by such important big band-era musicians as Duke Ellington, Count Basie, Frank Sinatra, the Mills Brothers, Bob Crosby, Freddie Slack, and Ella Mae Morse.

In his narration for the 1977 documentary film Life Goes to War, Johnny Carson remarked that while he was stationed on Guam during World War II, he had "memorized the entire score—and most of the dialogue—of Reveille with Beverly".

== Plot ==
Beverly Ross wants to be a radio personality, but has to run the switchboard at a local station. The blustery station owner, Mr. Kennedy, wants no part of programming the "jive that she loves", preferring the classics. She sends the pompous, early-morning personality Vernon Lewis away for a vacation, so she can transform his dull classical-music program into a jive session. She invites suggestions and requests and is swamped by mail from soldiers. She now devotes her show to the military, and the program becomes a success as Reveille with Beverly. Much of the film consists of musical numbers, visually representing the records she plays. The thin storyline connecting the songs concerns itself with Beverly and Lewis vying for control of the show, resulting in Beverly constantly leaving and returning to her old job at a record store.

== Cast ==
- Ann Miller as Beverly Ross
- William Wright as Barry Lang
- Dick Purcell as Andy Adams
- Franklin Pangborn as Vernon Lewis
- Tim Ryan as Mr. Kennedy
- Larry Parks as Eddie Ross
- Barbara Brown as Mrs. Beverly Ross
- Douglas Leavitt as Mr. Ross
- Adele Mara as Evelyn Ross
- Walter Sande as Pvt. Puckett, a.k.a. Canvasback
- Wally Vernon as Stomp McCoy
- Andrew Tombes as Mr. Smith, record-store owner
- Irene Ryan as Elsie (uncredited)
- Doodles Weaver as Elmer (uncredited)
- Bob Crosby Orchestra as themselves
- Freddie Slack| and his Orchestra]] as themselves
- Ella Mae Morse as herself
- Duke Ellington Orchestra as themselves
- Frank Sinatra as himself
- The Mills Brothers as themselves
- The Radio Rogues as themselves/specialty act
- Count Basie as Orchestra Leader
- Wilson Benge as Watson (uncredited)
- Herbert Rawlinson as Announcer (uncredited)

== Soundtrack ==
- "One O'Clock Jump"
  - Written by Count Basie
  - Played by Count Basie and his Orchestra
- "Take the 'A' Train"
  - Written by Billy Strayhorn
  - Sung by Betty Roche with Duke Ellington and the Duke Ellington Orchestra
- "Big Noise from Winnetka"
  - Music by Ray Bauduc and Bob Haggart
  - Lyrics by Ben Pollack and Bob Crosby
  - Played by Bob Crosby and his Orchestra with vocals by Lee Wilde, Lyn Wilde, and David Street
- "Cow-Cow Boogie"
  - Written by Benny Carter, Gene de Paul, and Don Raye
  - Sung by Ella Mae Morse with Freddie Slack and his Orchestra
- "Cielito Lindo"
  - Written by Quirino Mendoza
  - Adapted with English lyrics by Bill Driggs
  - Performed by the Mills Brothers
- "Sweet Lucy Brown"
  - Written by Leon René and Otis René
  - Performed by the Mills Brothers
- "Thumbs Up and V for Victory"
  - Music by Ted Fio Rito
  - Lyrics by Paul Francis Webster
  - Sung and danced by Ann Miller with chorus
- "Night and Day"
  - Written by Cole Porter
  - Sung by Frank Sinatra
- "Wabash Moon"
  - Written by Dave Dreyer and Morton Downey
  - Performed by the Radio Rogues
- "When the Moon Comes Over the Mountain"
  - Music by Harry M. Woods
  - Lyrics by Howard Johnson
  - Performed by the Radio Rogues
