= The Lion (film) =

1962 film directed by Jack Cardiff

- Directed by: Jack Cardiff
- Written by: Irene Kamp; Louis Kamp
- Based on: Le lion 1958 novel by Joseph Kessel
- Produced by: Samuel G. Engel
- Starring: William Holden; Trevor Howard; Capucine
- Cinematography: Ted Scaife
- Edited by: Russell Lloyd
- Music by: Malcolm Arnold
- Color process: Color by DeLuxe
- Distributed by: 20th Century Fox
- Release dates: 26 July 1962 (London); 19 August 1962 (United Kingdom); 21 December 1962 (New York City)
- Running time: 96 minutes
- Countries: United Kingdom; United States
- Language: English

The Lion is a 1962 British adventure film in CinemaScope directed by Jack Cardiff, starring William Holden and Trevor Howard. Filmed on location in Kenya and Uganda and on a property in Kenya co-owned by Holden, the Mount Kenya Safari Club.

The film is based on the novel The Lion by the French author Joseph Kessel.

The film had its World Premiere at the Leicester Square Theatre in London's West End on 26 July 1962.

== Plot ==
Successful American lawyer Robert Hayward is in Kenya because his ex-wife Christine is having problems with their eleven-year-old daughter Tina, with whom he has had no contact for many years. Tina, who has a great affinity with Africa, its customs and its wildlife, initially resents her father, feeling he had abandoned her.

Christine has remarried and her new husband John Bullit, a former big-game hunter, now manages a large Kenyan animal preserve. Tina considers Bullitt her father and Hayward merely her mother's ex-husband. There is tension between the adults because Christine left Hayward for Bullitt, having become "bewitched" by the beauty of Kenya and the wild, free lifestyle of the African bush. Christine is alarmed that Tina is likewise "bewitched" by the wild lifestyle Bullitt encourages, and fears her daughter's development is endangered by having no contact with modern society.

Tina spends much of her time in the company of King, a full-grown male lion she raised from a cub. Tina believes she has a psychic bond with the lion, even to the point of challenging King's mate, a wild lioness. Hayward earns Tina's respect when he witnesses this encounter without panicking but she fails to realize that her father now shares her mother's alarm over her dangerous lifestyle.

Hayward and Bullit compete for the romantic affection of Christine and for the daughterly affection of Tina. Bullitt further emphasises the danger of the African bush by taking Hayward with him, Christine and Tina on a reckless jeep trip, needlessly harassing enraged wild elephants, from which they only narrowly escape. Bullitt at first laughs off the danger but realizes afterwards that his macho display has backfired when it is revealed that Hayward has the legal right to claim custody of Tina.

The proud son and heir of a local Masai tribal chief has become enamored of Tina, having observed the almost magical connection between Tina and King. Hunting lions with only a spear and shield is how young men prove their valor, and this young man has not yet killed one. The chief is very old and becomes sick from a wound he received years before in a lion hunt. As local custom dictates, the old man is left in the bush to die, a fate which he accepts without complaint. But Hayward is horrified by his abandonment and even more shocked when Tina and Christine support leaving the chief where he is. Hayward insists against everyone's protests that the chief should be brought to their compound for treatment, though the camp's worker Kihero begs him not to, as their tribes are enemies.

The tribe believes the old chief is dead and proceeds with the ceremony to elevate his son as the new chief. At the ceremony, all the young people dance hypnotically in a courtship ritual and Hayward sees that Tina wants to join in, becoming as frenzied as the other youths. The young chief formally requests Tina's hand in marriage in front of the entire tribe. Just at this moment, the old chief rushes back into the village, denouncing his son and driving him from the village.

Enraged at Hayward's interference, the young man kills Kihero and seeks out King. Tina commands King to kill Kihero's murderer and a ferocious fight ensues. Bullitt is forced to shoot King, but it is too late. The young warrior is killed too. Finally even Bullit can see that this is not a fit environment to raise Tina, and he accepts that he has lost Christine as well. Hayward's reunited family flies home to America to start a new life together.

== Cast ==
- William Holden as Robert Hayward
- Trevor Howard as John Bullit
- Capucine as Christine
- Pamela Franklin as Tina
- Christopher Agunda as Elder of Masai (uncredited)
- Ralph Helfer as Masai Warrior (uncredited)
- Paul Oduor as Orlunga (uncredited)
- Makara Kwaiha Ramadhani as Bogo (uncredited)
- Samuel Obiero Romboh as Kihero (uncredited)
- Zakee as Ol' Kalu (uncredited)
- and the lion Zamba as King / The Lion

== Reception ==
Filmink called the film "a mess – what should be a children’s story, about a girl and her lion, is turned into a dull marital drama where the really interesting story (woman leaves dull husband to run off with big game hunter) is backstory and we’re meant to be happy at the end about a kid being dragged away from exciting Africa to boring old America."

== Comic book adaptation ==
- Gold Key: The Lion (January 1963)

== See also ==
- List of American films of 1962
