= Capucine =

French model and actress (1928–1990)

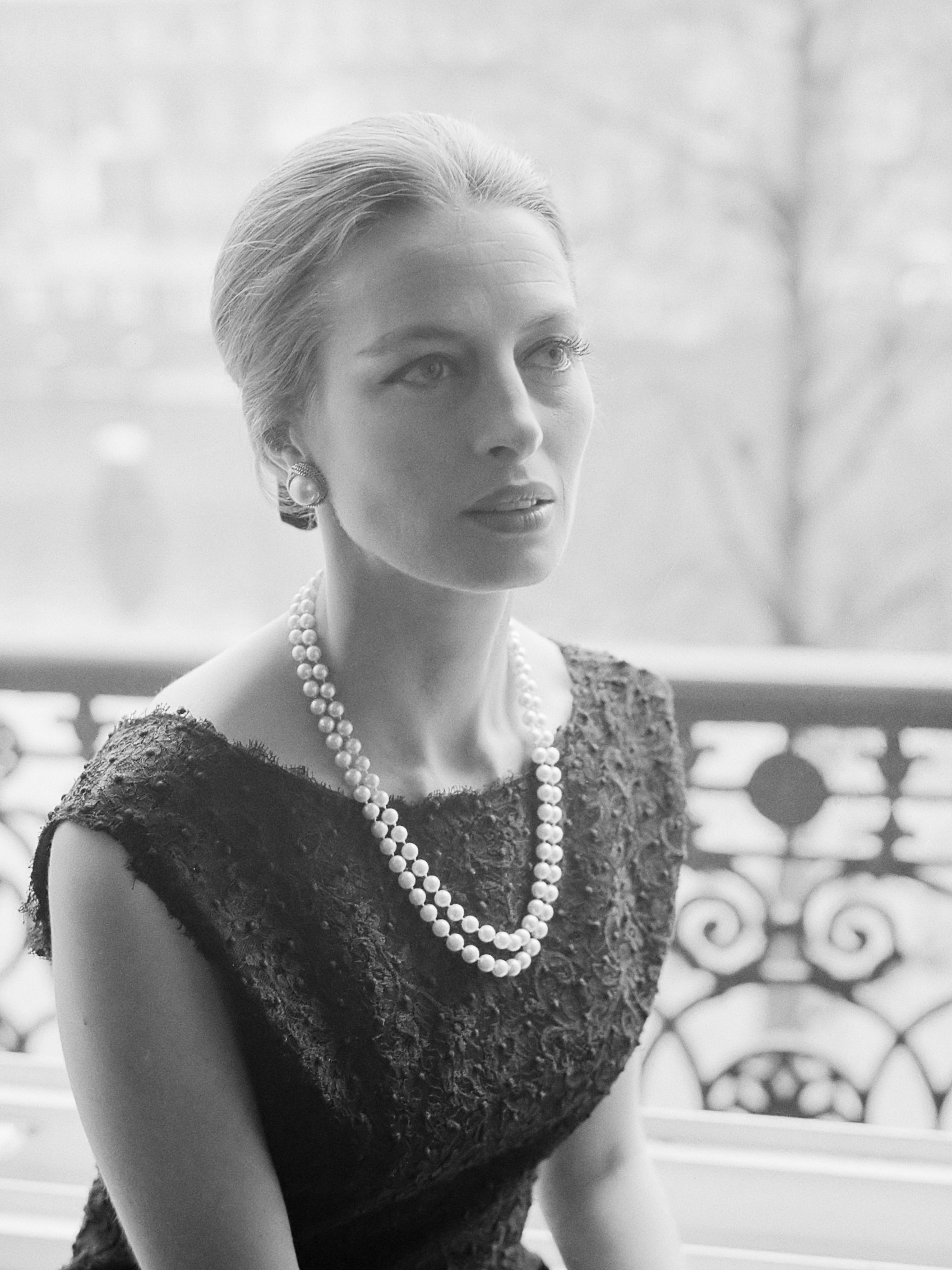
- Capucine in 1962
- Born: Germaine Hélène Irène Lefebvre; 6 January 1928; Saint-Raphaël, Var, France
- Died: 17 March 1990 (aged 62); Lausanne, Vaud, Switzerland
- Occupations: Model, actress
- Years active: 1948–1990
- Spouse: Pierre Trabaud (m. 1950; div. 1950)
- Partner: William Holden
- Parents: Arthur Jules Irénée Lefèbvre (father); Désirée Clementine Spitalier (mother)

Germaine Hélène Irène Lefebvre (French: [ʒɛʀmɛn elɛn iʀɛn ləfɛvʀ], 6 January 1928 – 17 March 1990), known by her mononym stage name Capucine (French: [kapysin]), was a French fashion model and actress known for her comedic roles in The Pink Panther (1963) and What's New Pussycat? (1965). She appeared in 36 films and 17 television productions between 1948 and 1990.

== Early life ==
Capucine was born Germaine Hélène Irène Lefebvre on 6 January 1928 in Saint-Raphaël, Var, France to Désirée Spitalier and Arthur Lefèbvre. She often misstated the date of her birth by claiming that she was born in 1931 or 1933, and most sources indicate those years. She attended school in Saumur, France, and earned a Bachelor of Arts degree in Foreign Languages.

In 1945, at age 17, while riding in a carriage in Paris, Lefebvre was noticed by a commercial photographer. Adopting the French name of a flower, "Capucine" (nasturtium, Tropaeolum), she became a fashion model, working for the fashion houses Givenchy and Christian Dior.

Capucine met Audrey Hepburn while modeling for Givenchy in Paris. They remained close friends for the rest of Capucine's life.

== Career ==
=== Early films ===
Capucine made her film debut in Jean Cocteau's The Eagle with Two Heads (1948), in a small, unbilled role. She also appeared in Jacques Becker's Rendezvous in July (1949) and Robert Dhéry's Crazy Show (1949).

She was in Marc-Gilbert Sauvajon's My Friend Sainfoin (1950) and Dhéry's Bernard and the Lion (1951).

After a break of a few years, Capucine appeared in Mademoiselle from Paris (1955) and Frou-Frou (1955).

=== Rise to fame ===
In 1957, film producer Charles K. Feldman spotted Capucine while she was modeling in New York City. Feldman put her under contract at $150 a week. He brought her to Hollywood to learn English and study acting under Gregory Ratoff. She took the stage name "Capucine", saying, "Two names are interesting and I hope one is interesting."

She signed a seven-year contract with Columbia Pictures in 1958. After unsuccessfully auditioning for the role of Feathers in Rio Bravo (1959), she landed her first English-speaking role in the film Song Without End (1960) with Dirk Bogarde, a biopic of Franz Liszt, where Capucine played Carolyne zu Sayn-Wittgenstein. Producer William Goetz said, "You can teach a girl to act, but nobody can teach her how to look like a princess. You've got to start with a girl who looks like a princess." Bogarde and Capucine had a brief romance on the set and he proposed marriage to her, which she politely turned down. They remained friends for the remainder of her life.

"Every time I get in front of the camera, I think of it as an attractive man I am meeting for the first time," she said in 1960. "I find him demanding and aloof, so I must do all I can to interest him." "I got much better as we went on," she said. "As the scenes warmed up, so did I."

In 1960, she was nominated for a Golden Globe Award.

Capucine followed this with North to Alaska (1960), a comedy that had been set up with her in mind by Feldman at 20th Century Fox. She played a French prostitute who becomes the love interest of John Wayne. Directed by Henry Hathaway, it was successful at the box office.

Capucine returned to Europe to co-star in Le triomphe de Michel Strogoff (1961) with Curd Jürgens, a sequel to Michel Strogoff (1956). Back in Hollywood, she had second billing in Walk on the Wild Side (1962), produced by Feldman, in which she portrayed a redeemed hooker. Co-star Laurence Harvey complained that Feldman cut his part to expand Capucine's role.

She was then William Holden's love interest in The Lion (1962). During filming, Capucine began a romance with Holden, which led to the end of her romantic relationship with Feldman; however, the producer remained loyal professionally. Feldman announced he would put Capucine in Mary Magdalene and Waltz of the Toreadors, but neither happened.

She moved to Switzerland in 1962.

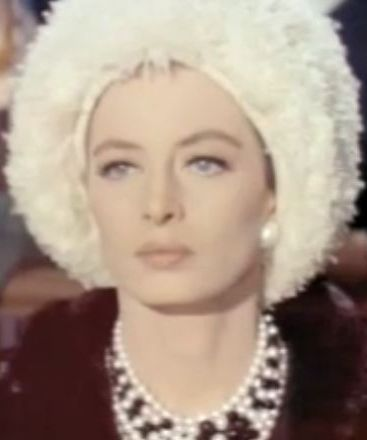
Capucine in The Pink Panther (1963)

Blake Edwards cast Capucine in The Pink Panther, playing Inspector Clouseau's wife, who is having an affair with a jewel thief, played by David Niven. It was a huge hit, and led to a number of sequels. In 1964, Capucine said the directors she had learned most from were Edwards and Henry Hathaway.

Capucine was reunited with Holden in The 7th Dawn (1964), produced by Feldman; it was a box office disappointment. Another film she did for Feldman, the comedy What's New Pussycat? (1965), which co-starred Sellers and Peter O'Toole, was far more successful; it was filmed entirely in France.

Capucine was one of several European stars in the anthology Sex Quartet (1966) for Columbia (originally The Queens), then Feldman put her in The Honey Pot (1967), directed by Joseph L. Mankiewicz. She was announced for Feldman's Casino Royale, but did not appear in the film.

Feldman died in May 1968, and Capucine's career never regained its former momentum. She inherited the rights to the book Zandy from his estate and sold them to the makers of Zandy's Bride.

=== Later career ===
Capucine then played what has been called "a series of sexually fluid roles which contributed to her status as a queer icon": Fräulein Doktor (1968), the Spanish thriller The Exquisite Cadaver (1969), and Fellini Satyricon (1969). Fellini said, "She had a face to launch a thousand ships...but she was born too late."

In 1968, she told an Italian magazine she wished she did not always have to be elegant, that she longed to play a "disheveled woman," but "since the directors know I was a model, it is obvious that they can't see me as anything else."

Dirk Bogarde suggested her for the role of Tadzio's mother in Death in Venice (1971), but Luchino Visconti turned her down, saying, "She has a horrible voice and too many teeth. She looks like a horse, a beautiful horse, I know that, I was a trainer. I know all about horses, but I don't want a horse."

Capucine had a supporting role in the Western Red Sun (1971) and guest-starred on Search (1972), her first TV series.

She supported Jean-Paul Belmondo in the comedy Incorrigible (1975) and Richard Burton in Jackpot, which was ultimately abandoned in 1975.

She appeared on television in Cinéma 16 and La pêche miraculeuse (1976), and had roles in The Con Artists (1976), Per amore (1976), Ecco noi per esempio (1977), Nest of Vipers (1978), From Hell to Victory (1979), Atrocious Tales of Love and Death (1979), Neapolitan Mystery (1979), Arabian Adventure (1979), Jaguar Lives! (1979), and Martin Eden (1979).

Capucine appeared in episodes of Orient Express (1980); Hart to Hart (1982); and Murder, She Wrote (1985), as well as the 1986 miniseries Sins.

She went to Europe to make Les invités (1982), Aphrodite (1982), Trail of the Pink Panther (1982), and Curse of the Pink Panther (1983).

Capucine appears in episodes of Série noire; Voglia di cantare; Murder, She Wrote; Honor Thy Father; Sins; Delirium (1987); My First Forty Years (1987); Gila and Rik (1987); Una verità come un'altra (1989); Quartier nègre (1989); Blaues Blut (1990); and Il giudice istruttore (1990).

== Personal life ==
Capucine met actor Pierre Trabaud on the set of Rendez-vous (1949) and they married the next year. The marriage lasted only eight months, and she never married again. She was the mistress of film producer Charles K. Feldman for many years.

Capucine met actor William Holden in the early 1960s. The two starred in the films The Lion (1962) and The 7th Dawn (1964). They reportedly began a two-year affair, which is alleged to have ended due to Holden's alcoholism. The split was amicable and Capucine and Holden remained friendly until his death in 1981. He left her $50,000 in his will.

== Death ==
On 17 March 1990, at age 62, Capucine jumped to her death from her eighth-floor apartment in Lausanne, Vaud, Switzerland, where she had lived for 28 years, having reportedly suffered from illness and depression for some time. The police said an investigation left no doubt that she died by suicide. Neighbours said she had led a reclusive life with her three cats, hardly ever leaving her apartment and spending most of her time reading.

== Selected filmography ==
Year	Title	Role	Notes
1948	The Eagle with Two Heads	Lady at the buffet	Uncredited
1949	Rendez-vous de juillet	One of Pierre's friends	Uncredited
1949	Branquignol	A cowgirl	Uncredited
1950	My Friend Sainfoin		
1951	Bernard and the Lion	The baroness	
1951	Four Red Roses	Colette	Credited as Valerie Darc
1955	Mademoiselle from Paris	Herself	Alternative title: Mademoiselle de Paris
1955	Frou-Frou	One of Arthus the painter's friends	Uncredited
1960	Song Without End	Princess Carolyne zu Sayn-Wittgenstein	
1960	North to Alaska	Michelle 'Angel' Bonet	
1961	The Triumph of Michael Strogoff	Tatoa, a Volskaya	
1962	Walk on the Wild Side	Hallie Gerard	
1962	The Lion	Christine	
1963	The Pink Panther	Simone Clouseau	
1964	The 7th Dawn	Dhana Mercier	
1965	What's New Pussycat?	Renée Lefebvre	
1966	Le fate	Marta	(segment "Fata Marta")
1967	The Honey Pot	Princess Dominique	
1969	Fräulein Doktor	Dr. Saforet	
1969	The Exquisite Cadaver	Lucia Fonte	
1969	Fellini Satyricon	Trifena	
1971	Red Sun	Pepita	
1972	Search	Silvana Tristano	Episode: "The Murrow Disappearance"
1975	Incorrigible	Hélène	
1975	Jackpot		
1976	The Con Artists	Belle Duke	Alternative titles: Bluff, The Con Man
1976	Per amore	Marina Reggiani, Alberto's wife	
1977	Ecco noi per esempio	Moglie di Click	
1978	Nest of Vipers	Amalia Mazzarini	
1979	From Hell to Victory	Nicole Levine	
1979	Neapolitan Mystery	Sister Angela	
1979	Arabian Adventure	Vahishta	
1979	Jaguar Lives!	Zina Vanacore	
1982	Hart to Hart	Lily Von Borg	Episode: "Hart of Diamonds"
1982	Aphrodite	Lady Suzanne Stanford	
1982	Trail of the Pink Panther	Lady Simone Lytton	
1983	Balles perdues	Madam Teufminn	
1983	Curse of the Pink Panther	Lady Simone Lytton	
1985	Murder, She Wrote	Belle Chaney	Episode: "Paint Me a Murder"
1986	Sins	Odile	Miniseries
1987	Delirium: Photo of Gioia	Flora	
1987	My First Forty Years	Princess Caracciolo	
1990	Blaues Blut	Countess von Altenberg	

== See also ==
- Mononymous persons
- List of suicides (A–M)
