= Massimo Venturiello =

Italian actor and voice actor (born 1957)

- Born: 4 August 1957 (age 68); Roccadaspide, Italy
- Occupations: Actor; voice actor; theatre director
- Years active: 1982–present
- Spouse: Tosca (m. 2024)

Massimo Venturiello (born 4 August 1957) is an Italian actor and voice actor.

== Biography ==
Born in Roccadaspide, Province of Salerno, in 1982 Venturiello graduated at the Silvio D'Amico Academy of Dramatic Arts in Rome and the same year he made his stage debut in an adaptation of William Shakespeare's Titus Andronicus directed by Gabriele Lavia. From then, he started an intense theatrical activity, which includes experimental and avant-garde works and a long collaboration with the director Giampiero Solari. Particularly, Venturiello was critically acclaimed for his performances in The Rose Tattoo, alongside Valeria Moriconi, and in Masaniello directed by Armando Pugliese. Also active in films and on television, he is well known for the role of Rudy in Gabriele Salvatores' Marrakech Express.

As a voice actor, Venturiello performed the Italian voice of Gary Oldman as Sirius Black in his first three appearances in the Harry Potter film franchise and as Commissioner James Gordon in Batman Begins. In his animated roles, he dubbed Hades in the 1997 film Hercules and Dr. Phillium Benedict in the 2001 film Recess: School's Out.

=== Personal life ===
In 2024, Venturiello married the singer Tosca after 21 years of dating.

== Filmography ==
=== Cinema ===
Year	Title	Role	Notes
1983	Where's Picone?		
1987	The Family	Armando	
1987	The Strangeness of Life	Mario	
1987	My First Forty Years	Roberto D'Angelo	
1987	Good Morning, Babylon	Duccio Bonanno	
1988	Rorret	Carl	
1989	Rosso di sera	Alex	
1989	Rebus	Miriam’s secretary	
1989	Marrakech Express	Rudy	
1990	L'autostop	Sandro	
1991	The Wicked	Enrico Carossi	
1991	Barocco	Attilio Morelli	
1992	Forbidden to Minors	Thomas Parker	
1992	In viaggio verso est	Alessandro Manetti	
1992	Lia, rispondi		
1993	Caccia alle mosche	Rocco	
1993	L'amore dopo	Leone Aloisi	
1994	Una notte che piove	Guido	
2001	Ravanello pallido	Claudio Pignatti	
2006	Our Land	Aldo Di Santo	
2025	La grazia	Ugo Romani	

=== Television ===
Year	Title	Role	Notes
1981	I ragazzi di celluloide	Allievo C.S.C.	TV miniseries
1982	Il caso Murri	Francesco Bonmartini	TV miniseries
1982	L'indizio	Il ricattatore	TV miniseries
1990	Aquile	Altieri	TV series
1992	Gli anni d'oro	Nicola	TV series
1992	Assunta Spina		TV miniseries
1993	L'ispettore anticrimine	Giuseppe Anastasia	TV miniseries
2000	Giochi pericolosi	Gabriele Lanza	TV miniseries
2000	Prigioniere del cuore	Commissario Giovannetti	TV miniseries
2001	Una lunga notte	Alberto	TV film
2002	Il giovane Casanova	Foscarini	TV miniseries
2002	Padri	Massimo	TV miniseries
2006	Distretto di Polizia	Cesare Carrano	1 episode
2007	Il Capo dei Capi	Angelo Mangano	TV miniseries
2007	Imperium: Pompeii	Chelidonius	TV film
2008	Mogli a pezzi	Gianni Nero	TV miniseries
2008	Inspector De Luca	Carnera	TV miniseries
2009	Intelligence – Servizi & segreti	Colonel Carlo Fulgeri	TV series
2010	Il peccato e la vergogna	Dilmo Duranti	Recurring role (season 1)
2012	Né con te né senza di te	Guglielmo Cestra	TV miniseries
2015	L'onore e il rispetto	Dante Giordano	Recurring role (season 4)
2016	Il sistema	Guido Alcamo	Recurring role

== Voice work ==
=== Dubbing ===
==== Films (Animation, Italian dub) ====
Year	Title	Role(s)	Ref
1997	Hercules	Hades	
1999	The Tale of Tsar Saltan	Prince	
2001	Recess: School's Out	Dr. Phillium Benedict	

==== Films (Live action, Italian dub) ====
Year	Title	Role(s)	Original actor	Ref
1985	To Live and Die in L.A.	Richard Chance	William Petersen	
1985	A Room with a View	George Emerson	Julian Sands	
1986	The Mission	Father John Fielding	Liam Neeson	
1995	Casino	Lester Diamond	James Woods	
1995	Jade	David Corelli	David Caruso	
1996	Dragonheart	Sir Bowen	Dennis Quaid	
1996	Ghosts of Mississippi	Byron De La Beckwith	James Woods	
1996	Escape from L.A.	Snake Plissken	Kurt Russell	
1996	The Stendhal Syndrome	Alfredo Grossi	Thomas Kretschmann	
1997	The Jackal	The Jackal	Bruce Willis	
1998	Les Misérables	Jean Valjean	Liam Neeson	
1999	Gloria	Kevin	Jeremy Northam	
1999	They Called Them... Brigands!	Carmine Crocco	Enrico Lo Verso	
2000	Billy Elliot	Jackie Elliot	Gary Lewis	
2000	Gangster No. 1	Freddie Mays	David Thewlis	
2003	Girl with a Pearl Earring	Johannes Vermeer	Colin Firth	
2004	Harry Potter and the Prisoner of Azkaban	Sirius Black	Gary Oldman	
2005	Harry Potter and the Goblet of Fire	Sirius Black	Gary Oldman	
2005	Batman Begins	James Gordon	Gary Oldman	
2007	Harry Potter and the Order of the Phoenix	Sirius Black	Gary Oldman	
2011	Red Riding Hood	Father Solomon	Gary Oldman	
2013	Paranoia	Nicholas Wyatt	Gary Oldman	
2023	The Marvels	Emperor Dro'ge	Gary Lewis	
2025	Captain America: Brave New World	Seth Voelker / Sidewinder	Giancarlo Esposito	
2025	Frankenstein	Henrich Harlander	Christoph Waltz	

==== Television (Animation, Italian dub) ====
Year	Title	Role(s)	Notes	Ref
1982	Cyborg 009	002 Jet Link	Main cast	
1987	Star Wars: Droids	C-3PO	Main cast	
1998–1999	Hercules: The Animated Series	Hades	Main cast	
2001–2003	House of Mouse	Hades	Recurring role (1st voice)	

==== Television (Live action, Italian dub) ====
Year	Title	Role(s)	Notes	Original actor	Ref
1983–1986	Knight Rider	KITT	Main cast (seasons 2–4)	William Daniels	
1996	Nostromo	Charles Gould	TV miniseries	Colin Firth	

==== Video games (Italian dub) ====
Year	Title	Role(s)	Ref
1997	Hercules	Hades	
