= William Holden Wildlife Foundation =

American organization

- Founded: 1982; Beverly Hills, California, USA
- Founder: Stefanie Powers, Don Hunt, Iris Hunt
- Type: Charitable trust
- Purpose: Environmental Education
- Location: Nanyuki, Kenya
- Website: http://www.whwf.org

The William Holden Wildlife Foundation (WHWF) is a 501(c)(3) non-profit organization based in the United States whose principal project is the William Holden Wildlife Education Center located near Nanyuki, Kenya. The Education Center is dedicated to wildlife conservation and environmental studies for local people, with occasional visits from international groups. The office of the Foundation is located in California, USA.

== Mission statement ==
To focus on the educational component of wildlife and environmental protection and habitat conservation. To foster a better understanding of the crucial role flora and fauna plays in the quality of life and its sustenance on our planet with emphasis on practical methods of sustainability accessible to all. To teach alternatives to habitat destruction for man and animals. To enlighten students and visitors to the available innovations in energy production techniques with low environmental impact. To inspire a personal commitment in all who participate.

== Educational Programs ==
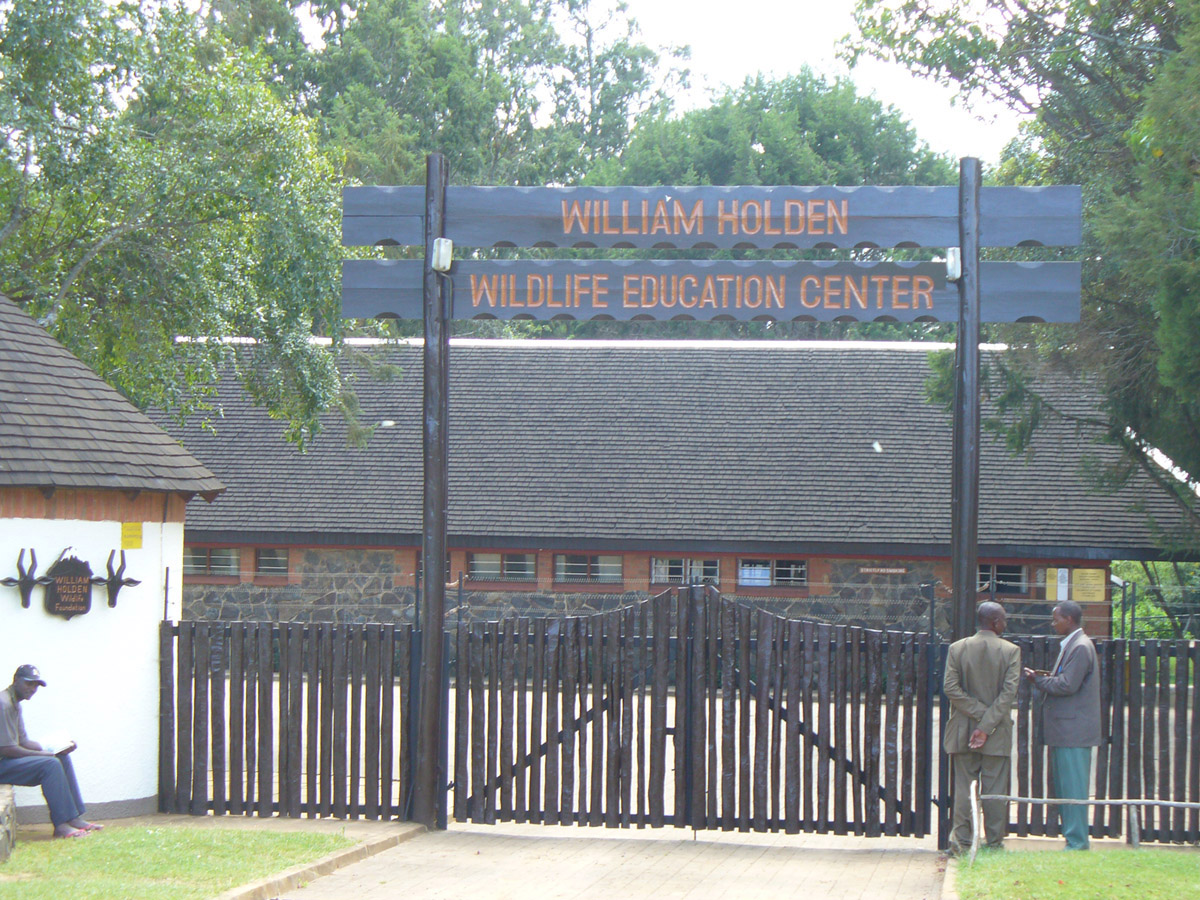
William Holden Wildlife Education Center.

The Center has served as many as 11,000 students in one year. The groups come to the Center from all over Kenya, generally for a stay of three days, during which curricula is adjusted according to the needs of individual groups.

Lectures are given by the Education staff, as are guided visits to the Mt. Kenya Wildlife Conservancy's animal orphanage and surrounding pastures.

On site educational displays include the following:

- A practical example of high-yield companion planting using compost fertilizers and crop rotation on a small plot.
- A tree nursery with indigenous trees that are fast-growing and nitrogen-producing.
- Displays of natural history, including soil samples and installations demonstrating how soil erosion occurs.
- A fish farm borrowing water from the adjacent river, and returning it to the river unpolluted.
- A nature walk to experience an unexploited virgin forest.
- A biogas digester that produces methane gas from llama dung for either low-level lighting or for cooking.

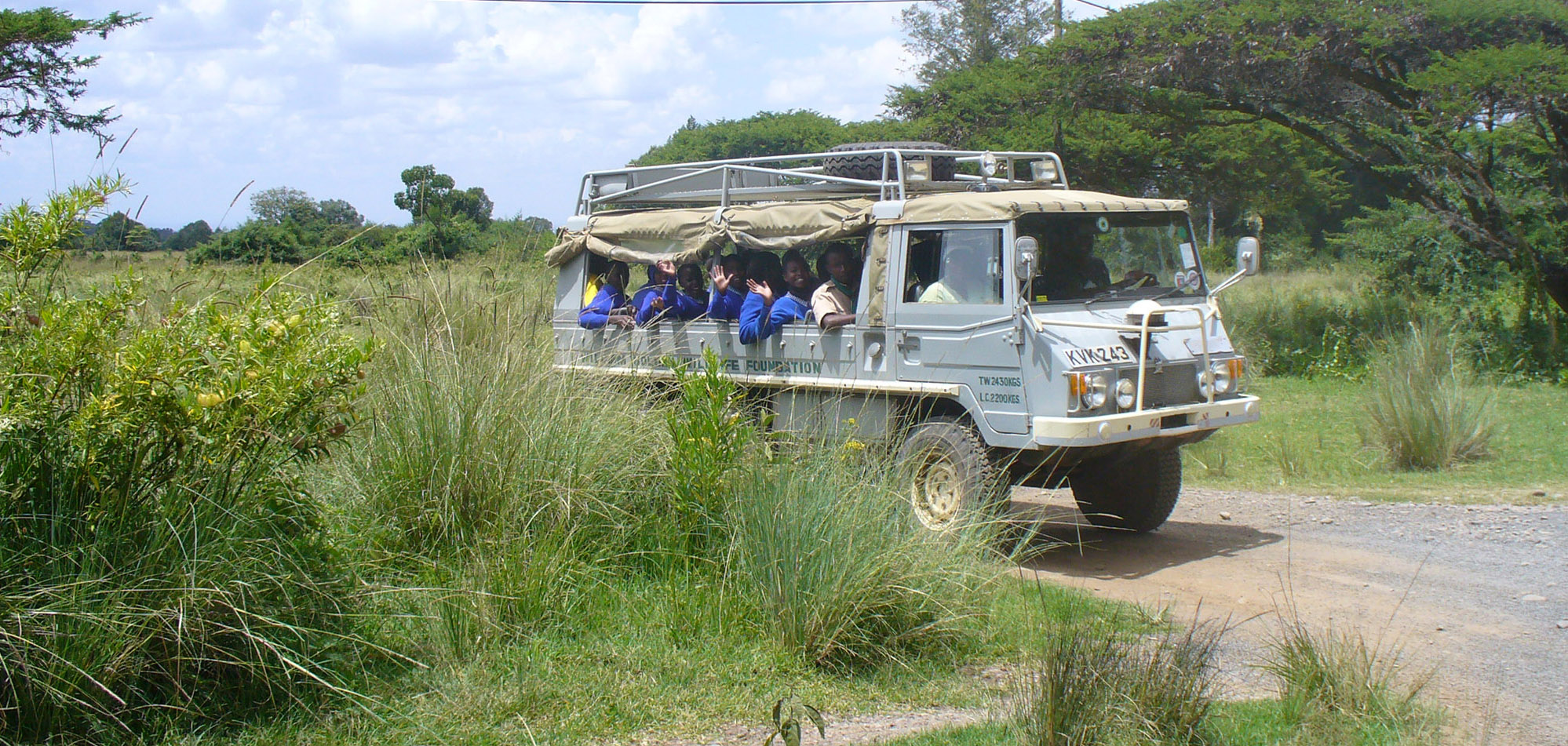
Children visiting from Nairobi see African wildlife at the Mt. Kenya Game Ranch.

- A hand press for the production of alternative fuel briquettes to burn in the efficient Bellerive cookers.
- A bush refrigerator.
- A solar cooker.
- The first known breeding herd of Chilean llamas in Africa.
- A permaculture wetland, enabling the complete water treatment and water purification of all used water at the center.
- Solar panels for water heating.
- A fully equipped library inside a lecture hall with a video system.
- Sleeping accommodation for 45 students and four teachers.

== Rural Outreach Programs ==
WHWF has constructed four libraries at two primary and two secondary schools in rural communities serving roughly 2,200 students on a continual basis. The libraries provide syllabus books for all grades, along with magazines, periodicals, books, pamphlets, and charts conveying the lessons of environmental concerns and information on wildlife.

Over the years, each school has been partnered with overseas schools where teachers lead classes in a pen pal program, exchanging letters with Kenyan students in schools.

== History ==
The Mt Kenya Game Ranch was founded in the 1960s by filmstar William Holden, Don and Iris Hunt, Julian McKeand and Deane Johnson after purchase of an 1,800-acre (7.3 km^{2}) game farm on the slopes of Mount Kenya. Over time, 37 species in breeding herds were captured and brought to the ranch to create the first game ranch of its kind in East Africa. This effort was inspired by observing the diminishing herds due to over-hunting, poaching, and population encroachment.

While his partners remained on the ranch to oversee its development, Holden carried on with his acting career, providing the financial support for the operation, and visiting whenever possible. Holden always spoke of the importance of education for local people in order that they might learn the valuable role wildlife plays in the balance of nature.

After his death in 1981 his longtime life partner Stefanie Powers, and Don and Iris Hunt created the William Holden Wildlife Foundation as a fulfillment of his desires and as a tribute to his dedication. Powers serves as the President of the Foundation and chief fundraiser and Don Hunt as the Vice President. Fifteen acres of land was excised from the game ranch as a site for the Foundation's Education Center, which was inaugurated in a groundbreaking ceremony in 1982.

== See also ==
- Sustainability
- Wildlife management
- Endangered species
- Conservation biology
