= Jean Ruth =

American actress (1917–2004)

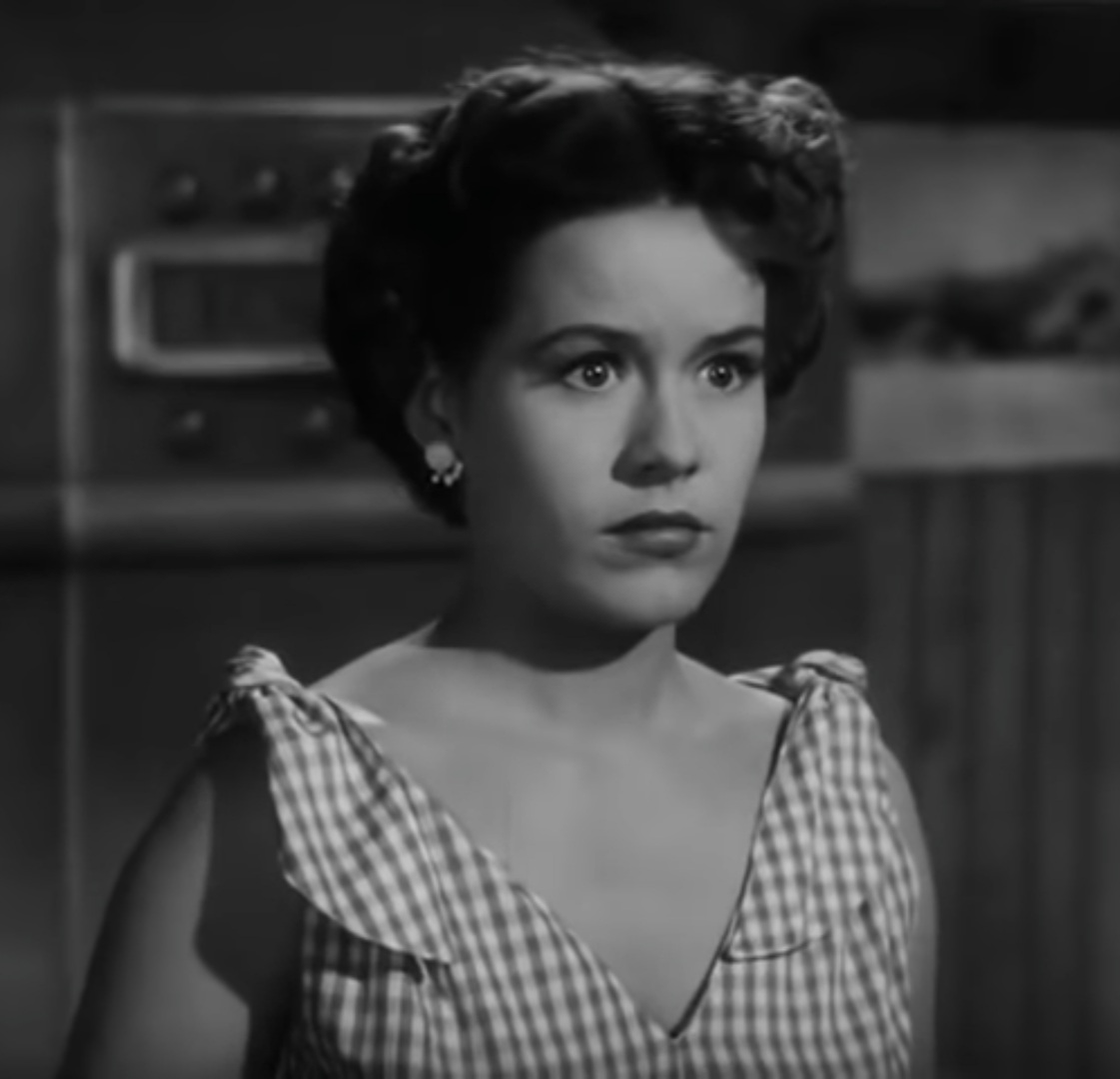
- Ruth in At War with the Army (1950)
- Born: September 10, 1917; Malvern, Pennsylvania, U.S.
- Died: September 18, 2004 (aged 87); Fortuna, California, U.S.
- Education: University of Colorado
- Occupation: Actress
- Years active: 1939–1957
- Spouses: Freddie Slack (m. 1945; div. 1948) John Hay (m. 1951)

Jean Ruth (September 10, 1917 – September 18, 2004) was an American actress and radio personality.

== Early life and career ==
Born in Malvern, Pennsylvania, Ruth was the daughter of Davis Clifford Ruth and Evelyn Read Hillyer. She graduated from Monrovia High School in 1935 and the University of Colorado in 1941.

As an actress, she is best known for appearing in the Martin and Lewis film At War with the Army (1950). Her radio broadcasts during WWII from 1941-44 were the basis for the musical film Reveille with Beverly. She claimed later that while broadcasting she would be asked to read out the titles of songs that didn't exist, which served as secret messages to the French Resistance. She also later befriended the famous wartime Japanese-American radio announcer Iva Toguri after she was prosecuted for treason for radio broadcasts from Tokyo.

== Personal life ==
She was married to American swing and boogie-woogie pianist and bandleader Freddie Slack from 1945 to 1948.

== Filmography ==
=== Film ===
| Year | Title | Role | Notes |
|---|---|---|---|
| 1939 | The Star Maker | Butch | (uncredited) |
| 1945 | Youth for the Kingdom | Carlotta Manson | |
| 1946 | O.S.S. | Brady's Secretary | (uncredited) |
| 1946 | Double Rhythm | Waitress | (uncredited) |
| 1947 | Ladies' Man | Caroline | (uncredited) |
| 1947 | Suddenly It's Spring | WAC Cpl. Michaels | |
| 1949 | Alias Nick Beal | Adding Machine Worker | (uncredited) |
| 1950 | No Man of Her Own | Nurse | (uncredited) |
| 1950 | Riding High | Nurse | (uncredited) |
| 1950 | Fancy Pants | Miss Wilkins | (uncredited) |
| 1950 | Union Station | Pretty Girl | |
| 1950 | At War with the Army | Millie | |
| 1951 | The Mating Season | Bridesmaid | (uncredited) |
| 1952 | Something to Live For | Secretary | (uncredited) |
| 1952 | The Lady and the Rocket | Lucille | (uncredited) |

=== Television ===
| Year | Title | Role | Notes |
|---|---|---|---|
| 1955 | Cavalcade of America | | |
| 1956 | Matinee Theater | | |
| 1957 | Panic! | Florence | 1 episode |
| 1957 | Highway Patrol | Alma Wigram | 1 episode |
| 1957 | Harbor Command | Jeanne Gorman | 1 episode |
