= Intelligence – Servizi & segreti =

- Genre: Spy fiction; Action drama
- Created by: Pietro Valsecchi
- Directed by: Alexis Sweet
- Starring: Raoul Bova; Ana Caterina Morariu; Dino Abbrescia; Massimo Venturiello; Irene Ferri; Salvatore Lazzaro; Sandra Franzo; Stefano Fresi; Vincent Riotta; Francesco Foti; Giorgio Marchesi
- Country of origin: Italy
- Original language: Italian
- No. of seasons: 1
- No. of episodes: 6

Production
- Running time: 95 min

Original release
- Network: Canale 5
- Release: September 21 – October 23, 2009

Intelligence – Servizi & segreti is an Italian action television series produced by Taodue comprising six 95-minute episodes aired in 2009. The filming took place over 36 months, cost €20M, and employed 500 stuntmen, 1000 cars and other vehicles, and 300 helicopters. The locations included Yemen, Tunisia, Syria, Romania and Switzerland.

== Plot ==
=== Background ===
Marco Tancredi (Raoul Bova) is an ex-parachutist from the Italian special forces who retired into civil life traumatised by his disastrous final mission in Yemen. A psychiatrist Lidia Lenti (Irene Ferri) has helped him recover from his mental scars. He marries her and begins a new life.

=== Episodes 1 and 2 ===
His life is turned upsided down when Lidia is killed in what appears to be a tragic accident during an armed hold-up. Tancredi is unconvinced by the circumstances and begins an investigation. He learns that Lidia had been working for the Italian anti-terrorist department, whose leader Carlo Fulgeri (Massimo Venturiello) invites him to join it. Here he becomes acquainted with Lidia's close friend Giada Lunardi (Ana Caterina Morariu). He uses his new position to continue his investigation. He finds a clue leading him to a flat in Bucharest, where he is arrested by the Romanian secret service, but Giada, sent by Fulgeri to keep an eye on him, helps him escape.

They make contact with Massimo Carlisi (Dino Abbrescia), an amiable but corrupt member of the anti-terrorist squad who is himself on the run. Another clue leads to a Russian former secret agent, but he is killed by polonium poisoning before he can tell them more than that Lidia had been investigating circumstances relating to Tancredi's last mission in the Yemen. The killer, Oksana (Magdalena Grochowska), is a Russian whose young daughter had been killed by Russian forces, and who has been waging a vendetta ever since. Tancredi succeeds in intercepting her before she can mount her next attack.

Tancredi and Giada find a memory card left by Lidia: it points them to a Korean called Kim Gun, but they are attacked with narcotic darts and the memory card taken from them.

=== Episodes 3 and 4 ===
With the help of the Gianlisi and the anti-terrorist department's computer specialist Brain (Stefano Fresi), Tancredi learns the identify of the mysterious assailant. Meanwhile, Tancredi and the rest of the department foil at the last minute a biological warfare attack planned by Arab terrorists.

Tancredi continues his investigations, but is engaged in another task, first infiltrating and then helping the department defeat a Taliban arms network.

=== Episodes 5 and 6 ===
Tancredi and Giada, having liberated Giada's brother Filippo (Giorgio Marchesi) from their mysterious adversaries, learn that the CIA have denounced him to Fulgeri as having raped, tortured and murdered a young woman. He denies any involvement.

The adversaries are directed by Giovanni Sgrò (Francesco Foti), right-hand man of Licio Mariani (Vincent Riotta) for whom Filippo has been working. Mariani is director of a charitable organisation which acts as a front for his own ends. Sgrò succeeds in framing Tancredi and Giada for the attack which freed Filippo.

Giada, Filippo, Tancredi and Gianlisi are now all in hiding from the Italian services, making use of a berthed motorboat owned by a friend of Gianlisi's. They learn of the involvement of a former physicist Hans Weber (David Brandon), now spending his retirement hunting. They decide to visit him in the search of information; meanwhile Sgrò blackmails Filippo into murdering Tancredi, Gianlisi and his sister; but drawing the line at the last of these, he keeps her with him. She interrupts him in the act, shooting him in the head, and managing to give Tancredi and Gianlisi warning.

They find that Weber has escaped to a location in Tunisia. They follow him there, but are attacked first by the mysterious adversaries, then by the Italian secret service. Tancredi is captured and taken back to Turin, but he escapes with the help of Giada and Gianlisi. They identify the ingegner Moreau (Emanuele Vezzoli) as a member of the group that have been pursuing them. They abduct him and find that he is booked onto a flight to Yemen. Tancredi assumes his identity and is escorted to an abandoned monastery which is being used as a nuclear laboratory. Here he encounters Sgrò but (with the help of Giada, Gianlisi and a disaffected engineer (Clotilde Sabatino)) thwarts his plans, leading to the destruction of the monastery.

Back in Italy he finds that Sgrò has survived and is planning a nuclear explosion in the Vatican. Tancredi thwarts the attempt, recovering the missing memory card from Sgrò's body. From it he learns that the mole within the department is someone who has been like a family member to him.

== Cast ==
- Raoul Bova: Marco Tancredi
- Ana Caterina Morariu: Giada Lunardi
- Dino Abbrescia: Massimo Carlisi
- Massimo Venturiello: Colonel Carlo Fulgeri
- Irene Ferri: Lidia Lenti
- Salvatore Lazzaro: Antonio Mosca
- Vincent Riotta: Licio Mariani

== Projected second series ==
A second series of the programme was announced but the project was abandoned.

== See also ==
- List of Italian television series
