= Ecco noi per esempio =

- Italian theatrical release poster
- Directed by: Sergio Corbucci
- Written by: Sergio Corbucci
- Produced by: Achille Manzotti
- Cinematography: Giuseppe Rotunno
- Music by: Vince Tempera
- Release date: 1977
- Language: Italian

Ecco noi per esempio ("here's us, for example") is a 1977 Italian comedy film written and directed by Sergio Corbucci. It was the first movie starring the comedian-star duo composed of Adriano Celentano and Renato Pozzetto. It is mostly set in Milan.

== Cast ==
- Adriano Celentano: Antonmatteo Colombo aka Click
- Renato Pozzetto: Palmambrogio Guanziroli
- Barbara Bach: Ludovica
- Giuliana Calandra Beatrice
- Capucine: Mariarosa Colombo, former wife of Click
- Antonio Casagrande: Commissioner of Police
- Felice Andreasi: the publisher
- Georges Wilson: Melano Melani
- Elio Crovetto: the newsagent
- Franca Marzi: Carmen, the landlady
- Imma Piro: Vincenzina, girlfriend of Click
- Sal Borgese horse thief
- Ugo Bologna: Gianni
- Walter Valdi: friend of Click
- Carmen Russo: dancer at the disco
