= Union Station (film) =

1950 crime drama film directed by Rudolph Maté

- French theatrical release poster
- Directed by: Rudolph Maté
- Screenplay by: Sydney Boehm
- Based on: Nightmare in Manhattan; 1950 novel by Thomas Walsh
- Produced by: Jules Schermer
- Starring: William Holden; Nancy Olson; Barry Fitzgerald
- Cinematography: Daniel L. Fapp
- Edited by: Ellsworth Hoagland
- Music by: Heinz Roemheld
- Production company: Paramount Pictures
- Distributed by: Paramount Pictures
- Release date: September 8, 1950
- Running time: 80 minutes
- Country: United states
- Language: English
- Box office: $1,425,000

Union Station is a 1950 crime drama film noir directed by Rudolph Maté and starring William Holden, Nancy Olson and Barry Fitzgerald.

== Plot ==
At Chicago Union Station, Police Lieutenant William "Bill" Calhoun is approached by an apprehensive passenger named Joyce Willecombe, who believes that two men aboard her train may be up to no good.

The two men deposit a suitcase in a storage locker. When Bill retrieves it, Joyce recognizes the clothing as belonging to Lorna Murchison, the blind daughter of wealthy Henry Murchison, Joyce's employer. When Mr. Murchison is brought in, he admits Lorna has been kidnapped and held for ransom, but does not want the police to get involved as they might endanger his daughter's life. Bill and his boss, Inspector Donnelly, persuade him to accept their help. The railway station where Calhoun works has been chosen as the location to pay off the ransom.

When the kidnappers make contact with Murchison at the station, Joyce recognizes them. The police trail one of them, Gus Hadder, but he spots them and flees, only to be accidentally run over in the trainyard. The police withhold his death from the press to leave the remaining kidnappers in the dark. Later, Joyce spots Joe Beacom, the leader of the gang, and sees a third member, Vince Marley.

Before Beacom can drive away Joyce memorizes the license plate number, and the police arrest Marley. When he refuses to talk, Donnelly cunningly tells Bill to make his death look accidental. Just as the police appear ready to throw him in front of an arriving train, he falls for the ruse, cracks, and spills all. By the time the authorities get to the kidnappers' hideout they have fled.

When a keen-eyed patrolman spots Beacom's car, a gunfight breaks out. The policeman is killed, and Beacom's moll, Marge, is caught in the crossfire. From a hospital deathbed she tells Bill and Donnelly that Beacom intends to kill Lorna after he gets the ransom. She also reveals that Beacom used to work at the station.

Beacom secrets Lorna in the municipal tunnel underneath Union Station, where he used to play (and commit petty crimes) as a boy. The payoff upstairs at the Station goes off without a hitch, with Beacom using a commercial messenger boy the pick up the ransom. Beacom, dressed as a conductor, forces a parcel clerk to accept the suitcase with the money and switch it with a decoy bag. As the messenger leaves with the decoy, Joyce recognizes part of Lorna's coat sticking out of it.

Beacom retreats to the municipal tunnel, and Bill is shot in the shoulder trying to apprehend him. Bill guns Beacom down and rescues Lorna. In the aftermath, Joyce (who has developed an attraction to Bill, and vice versa) tends Bill's wound.

== Cast ==
- William Holden as Lt. William Calhoun
- Nancy Olson as Joyce Willecombe
- Barry Fitzgerald as Inspector Donnelly
- Lyle Bettger as Joe Beacom
- Jan Sterling as Marge Wrighter
- Allene Roberts as Lorna Murchison
- Herbert Heyes as Henry L. Murchison
- Don Dunning as Gus Hadder
- Fred Graff as Vince Marley
- James Seay as Detective Eddie Shattuck
- Parley Baer as Detective Gottschalk (as Parley E. Baer)
- Ralph Sanford as Detective Fay
- Richard Karlan as Detective George Stein
- Bigelow Sayre as Detective Ross
- Charles Dayton as Howard Kettner
- Jean Ruth as Pretty Girl

== Background ==
The film was based on Nightmare in Manhattan, an Edgar Award-winning novel by Thomas Walsh. Sydney Boehm's script for the film version was nominated for an Edgar in the screenplay category. Aside from changing the setting from New York City's Grand Central Station to Chicago's Union Station (though the Los Angeles Union Station was the actual filming location), and changing the kidnap victim from a little boy to a blind, teen-aged girl, the script was quite faithful to its source material.

William Holden and Nancy Olson also appeared in Sunset Boulevard the same year.

=== Filming locations ===
Filming locations include Union Station, Downtown Los Angeles, California,) and Chicago's South Side El, where the train is uncoupled to go on the Stockyards Branch, in service from 1892 until 1957.

== Reception ==
Variety gave actor William Holden a good contemporary review, writing, "William Holden, while youthful in appearance to head up the railway policing department of a metropolitan terminal, is in good form."

Critic Jerry Renshaw lauded the film and wrote in 1999, "On the surface, Union Station is a fairly routine action film for 1950, with its high level of suspense, strong-arm police procedural tactics, and caper-film trappings. However, a definite noir outlook is belied by the fact that the police play as rough as the bad guys, blurring the lines of good and evil. Audiences are used to seeing Barry Fitzgerald as a kindly Irish priest in most roles; during the scene on the empty platform, though, Fitzgerald's Inspector Donnelly tells the cops in his most charming Father O'Flaherty voice, 'Make it look accidental.' That's one of the more chilling moments of noir, more suited to James Ellroy than Fifties Hollywood. Director Maté also helmed the classic D.O.A. in 1950."

Channel 4's 2008 film review notes, "Despite the barely believable plot, the film has a real edge. Made in 1950, it obviously can't push to the extremes of Dirty Harry but it shares the same mean spirit. Maté capitalizes on the story's setting by using innocent passengers and the station's dramatic spaces to heighten the feverish atmosphere."
