= William Holden =

American actor (1918–1981)

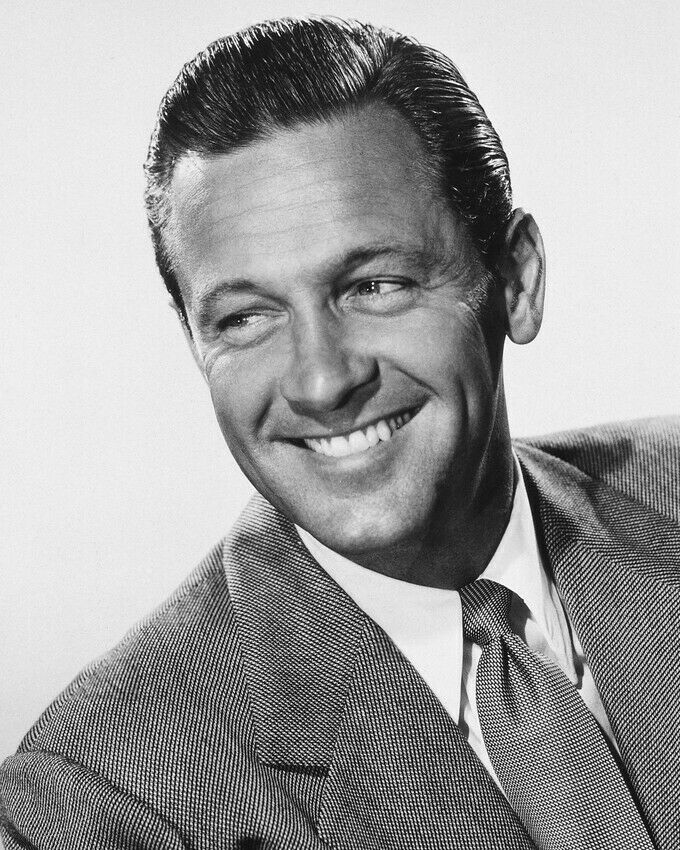
- Holden in a publicity photo, 1950
- Born: William Franklin Beedle Jr. April 17, 1918; O'Fallon, Illinois, U.S.
- Died: November 12, 1981 (aged 63); Santa Monica, California, U.S.
- Education: Pasadena Junior College
- Occupation: Actor
- Years active: 1938–1981
- Spouse: Brenda Marshall (m. 1941; div. 1971)
- Partner(s): Stefanie Powers (1972–1981; his death)
- Children: 3
- Awards: Academy Award for Best Actor (1953); Primetime Emmy Award for Outstanding Lead Actor (1974)
- Military career
- Allegiance: United States
- Branch: United States Army
- Service years: 1942–1945
- Rank: First lieutenant
- Wars: World War II

William Franklin Holden (né Beedle; April 17, 1918 – November 12, 1981) was an American actor. He was an Academy Award and Primetime Emmy Award winner, and one of the biggest box-office draws of the 1950s. He was named one of the "Top 10 Stars of the Year" six times (1954–1958, 1961), and appeared as 25th on the American Film Institute's list of 25 greatest male stars of Classical Hollywood cinema.

Holden began appearing in films the late 1930s, playing his first lead role in the boxing drama Golden Boy (1939). He would establish himself as a reliable and bankable leading man during the following decade, twice winning the National Board of Review Award, and would gain further critical recognition with his performance as Joe Gillis in Billy Wilder's Sunset Boulevard (1950). In 1954, he won an Academy Award for Best Actor for his portrayal of a prisoner-of-war in Wilder's Stalag 17.

Holden would co-star in several popular and critically-acclaimed films, including Sabrina (1954), Executive Suite (1954), Picnic (1955), The Bridge on the River Kwai (1957), The World of Suzie Wong (1960), The Wild Bunch (1969) and Network (1976). He won a Primetime Emmy for Outstanding Lead Actor in a Limited Series or Movie for the made-for-TV film The Blue Knight (1973).

== Early life ==
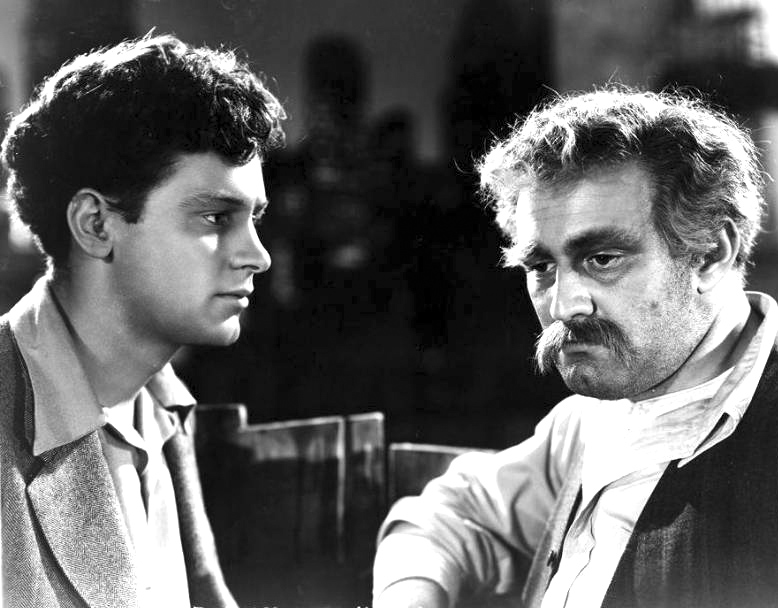
A young Holden (left) with Lee J. Cobb in his first starring role in a film, Golden Boy (1939)

Holden was born William Franklin Beedle Jr. on April 17, 1918, in O'Fallon, Illinois, son of Mary Blanche Beedle (née Ball; 1898–1990), a schoolteacher, and her husband, William Franklin Beedle Sr. (1891–1967), an industrial chemist. He had two younger brothers: Robert Westfield Beedle (1921–1944) who was killed in action in World War II, and Richard P. Beedle (1924–1964).

His family moved to South Pasadena when he was three. After graduating from South Pasadena High School, Holden attended Pasadena Junior College, where he became involved in local radio plays.

== Career ==
=== Paramount ===
Holden appeared uncredited in Prison Farm (1939) and Million Dollar Legs (1939) at Paramount.

A version of how he obtained his stage name "Holden" was given by George Ross of Billboard in 1939: "William Holden, the lad just signed for the coveted lead in Golden Boy, used to be Bill Beedle. And here is how he obtained his new movie tag. On the Columbia lot is an assistant director and scout named Harold Winston. Not long ago, he was divorced from the actress, Gloria Holden, but carried the torch after the marital rift. Winston was one of those who discovered the Golden Boy newcomer and who renamed him—in honor of his former spouse!"

=== Golden Boy ===
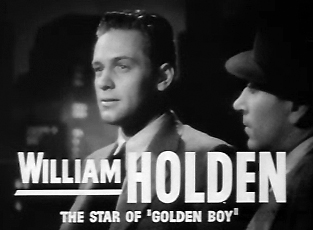
With George Raft (right) in Invisible Stripes (1939)

Holden's first starring role was in Golden Boy (1939), costarring Barbara Stanwyck, in which he played a violinist-turned-boxer. The film was made for Columbia, which negotiated a sharing agreement with Paramount for Holden's services.

Holden was still an unknown actor when he made Golden Boy, while Stanwyck was already a film star. She liked Holden and went out of her way to help him succeed, devoting her personal time to coaching and encouraging him, which made them lifelong friends. When she received her Honorary Oscar at the 1982 Academy Award ceremony, Holden had died in an accident just a few months prior. At the end of her acceptance speech, she paid him a personal tribute: "I loved him very much, and I miss him. He always wished that I would get an Oscar. And so tonight, my golden boy, you got your wish".

Next he starred with George Raft and Humphrey Bogart in the Warner Bros. gangster epic Invisible Stripes (1939), billed below Raft and above Bogart.

Back at Paramount, he starred with Bonita Granville in Those Were the Days! (1940) followed by the role of George Gibbs in the film adaptation of Our Town (1940), done for Sol Lesser at United Artists.

Columbia put Holden in a Western with Jean Arthur, Arizona (1940), then at Paramount he was in a hugely popular war film, I Wanted Wings (1941) with Ray Milland and Veronica Lake.

He did another Western at Columbia, Texas (1941) with Glenn Ford, and a musical comedy at Paramount, The Fleet's In (1942) with Eddie Bracken, Dorothy Lamour, and Betty Hutton.

He stayed at Paramount for The Remarkable Andrew (1942) with Brian Donlevy, then made Meet the Stewarts (1943) at Columbia. Paramount reunited Bracken and him in Young and Willing (1943).

=== World War II ===
Holden served as a second lieutenant and then a first lieutenant in the United States Army Air Force during World War II. He acted in training films, including Reconnaissance Pilot (1943), for the First Motion Picture Unit.

=== Post war ===
Holden's first film back from the services was Blaze of Noon (1947), an aviator picture at Paramount directed by John Farrow. He followed it with a romantic comedy, Dear Ruth (1947) and he was one of many cameos in Variety Girl (1947). RKO borrowed him for Rachel and the Stranger (1948) with Robert Mitchum and Loretta Young. Holden starred in the 20th Century Fox film Apartment for Peggy (1948). At Columbia, he starred in film noirs, The Dark Past (1948), The Man from Colorado (1949) and Father Is a Bachelor (1950). At Paramount, he did another Western, Streets of Laredo (1949). Columbia teamed him with Lucille Ball for Miss Grant Takes Richmond (1949), and the sequel to Dear Ruth, Dear Wife (1949).

=== Sunset Boulevard ===
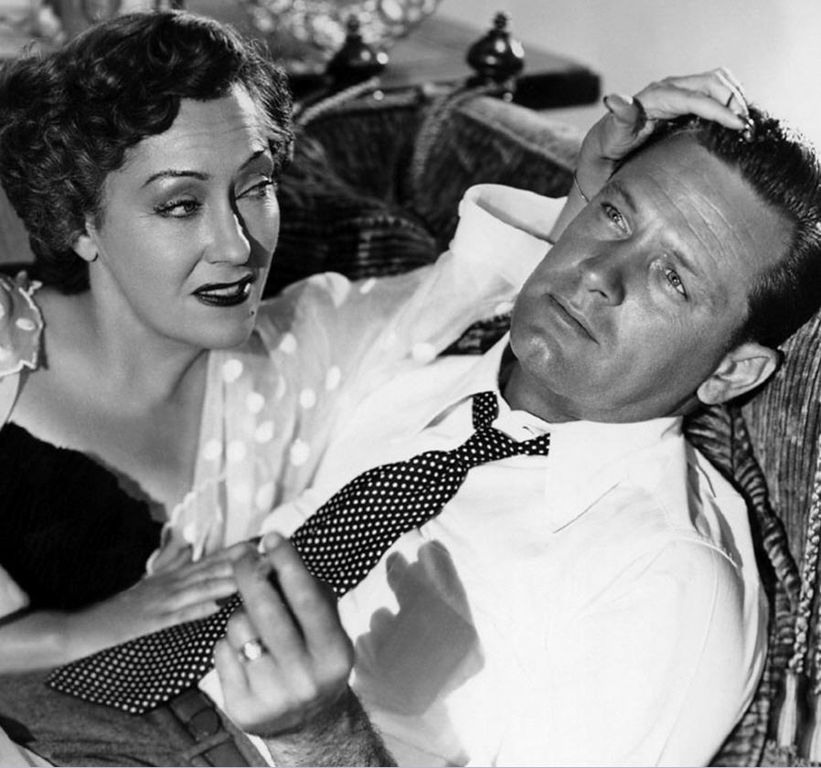
With Gloria Swanson in Sunset Boulevard (1950)

Holden's career took off again in 1950 when Billy Wilder tapped him to play a down-at-heel screenwriter taken in by a faded silent film actress (Gloria Swanson) in Sunset Boulevard. Holden earned his first Best Actor Oscar nomination for the role.

Getting the role was a lucky break for Holden, as Montgomery Clift was initially cast but backed out of his contract. Swanson later said, "Bill Holden was a man I could have fallen in love with. He was perfection on and off screen." And Wilder commented "Bill was a complex guy, a totally honorable friend. He was a genuine star. Every woman was in love with him." Paramount reunited him with Nancy Olson, one of his Sunset Boulevard costars, in Union Station (1950).

Holden had another good break when he was cast as Judy Holliday's love interest in the big-screen adaptation of the Broadway hit Born Yesterday (1950). He made two more films with Olson: Force of Arms (1951) at Warner Bros. and Submarine Command (1951) at Paramount. Holden did a sports film at Columbia, Boots Malone (1952), then returned to Paramount for The Turning Point (1952).

=== Stalag 17 and peak of stardom ===
Holden was reunited with Wilder in Stalag 17 (1953), for which Holden won the Academy Award for Best Actor. His acceptance speech at the 26th Academy Awards was one of the shortest in Oscar history: "Thank you ... thank you."

His success in Stalag 17 ushered in the peak years of Holden's stardom. He made a sex comedy with David Niven for Otto Preminger, The Moon Is Blue (1953), which was a huge hit, in part due to controversy over its content. At Paramount, he was in a comedy with Ginger Rogers that was not particularly popular, Forever Female (1953). A Western at MGM, Escape from Fort Bravo (1953) did much better, and the all-star Executive Suite (1954) was a notable success.

=== Sabrina ===
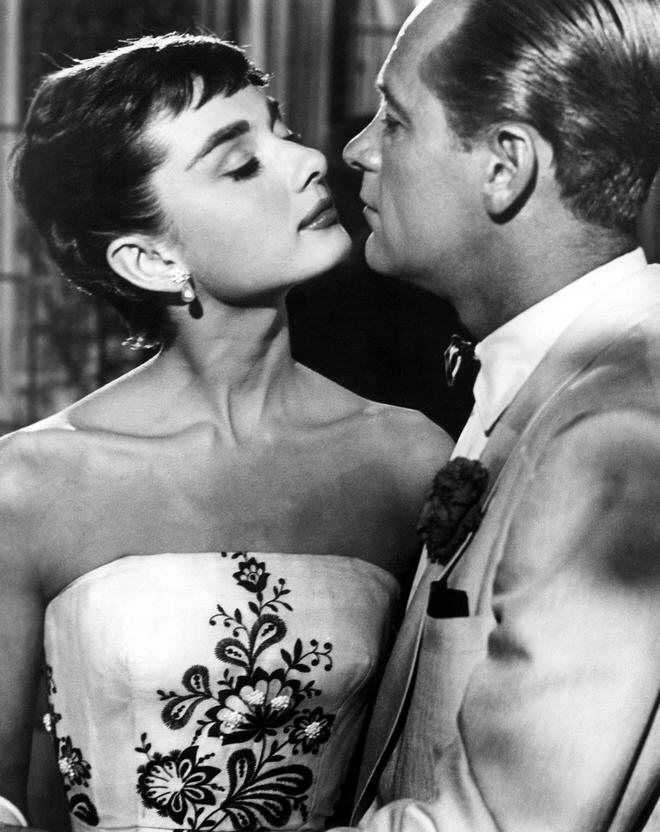
With Audrey Hepburn in Sabrina (1954)

Holden made a third film with Wilder, Sabrina (1954), billed beneath Audrey Hepburn and Humphrey Bogart. Holden and Hepburn became romantically involved during the filming, unbeknownst to Wilder: "People on the set told me later that Bill and Audrey were having an affair, and everybody knew. Well, not everybody! I didn't know." The interactions between Bogart, Hepburn and Holden made shooting less than pleasant, as Bogart had wanted his wife, Lauren Bacall, to play Sabrina. Bogart was not especially friendly toward Hepburn, who had little Hollywood experience, while Holden's reaction was the opposite, wrote biographer Michelangelo Capua. Holden recalls their romance:

Before I even met her, I had a crush on her, and after I met her, just a day later, I felt as if we were old friends, and I was rather fiercely protective of her, though not in a possessive way.

Their relationship did not last much beyond the completion of the film. Holden, who was at this point dependent on alcohol, said, "I really was in love with Audrey, but she wouldn't marry me." Rumors at the time had it that Hepburn wanted a family, but when Holden told her that he had had a vasectomy and having children was impossible, she moved on. (A few months later, Hepburn met Mel Ferrer, whom she later married and with whom she had a son Sean Hepburn Ferrer.)

He took third billing for The Country Girl (1954) with Bing Crosby and Grace Kelly, directed by George Seaton from a play by Clifford Odets. It was a big hit, as was The Bridges at Toko-Ri (1954), a Korean War drama with Kelly.

In 1954, Holden was featured on the cover of Life. On February 7, 1955, Holden appeared as a guest star on I Love Lucy as himself. The golden run at the box office continued with Love Is a Many-Splendored Thing (1955), from a bestselling novel, with Jennifer Jones, and Picnic (1955), as a drifter, in an adaptation of the William Inge play with Kim Novak. Picnic was his last film under the contract with Columbia.

A second film with Seaton did not do as well, The Proud and Profane (1956), where Holden played the role with a moustache. Neither did Toward the Unknown (1957), the one film Holden produced himself.

=== The Bridge on the River Kwai ===
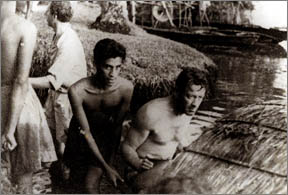
Holden and Chandran Rutnam during shooting

Holden had his most widely recognized role as "Commander" Shears in David Lean's The Bridge on the River Kwai (1957) with Alec Guinness, a huge commercial success. His deal was considered one of the best ever for an actor at the time, with him receiving 10% of the gross, which earned him over $2.5 million. He stipulated that he only receive a maximum of $50,000 of this per year ($573,164 in 2025 dollars).

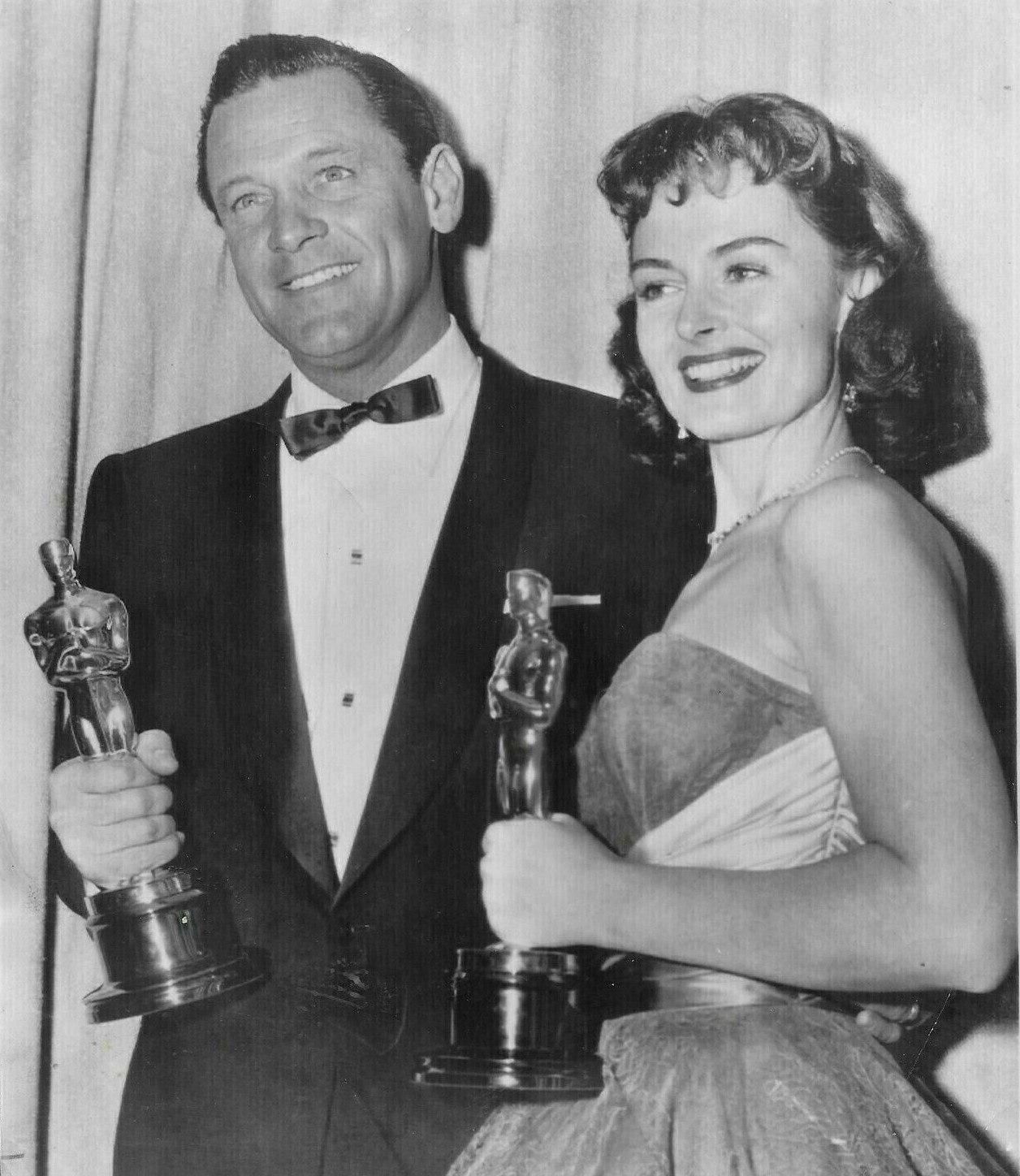
With Donna Reed at the 1954 Academy Awards show

He made another war film for a British director, The Key (1958) with Trevor Howard and Sophia Loren for director Carol Reed. He played an American Civil War military surgeon in John Ford's The Horse Soldiers (1959) opposite John Wayne, which was a box-office disappointment. Columbia would not meet Holden's asking price of $750,000 and 10% of the gross for The Guns of Navarone (1961); the amount he wanted exceeded the combined salaries of stars Gregory Peck, David Niven, and Anthony Quinn.

Holden had another hit with The World of Suzie Wong (1960) with Nancy Kwan, which was shot in Hong Kong. Less popular was Satan Never Sleeps (1961), the last film of Clifton Webb and Leo McCarey; The Counterfeit Traitor (1962), his third film with Seaton; or The Lion (1962), with Trevor Howard and Capucine. The latter was shot in Africa and sparked Holden's fascination with the continent that was to last for the rest of his life.

Holden's films continued to struggle at the box office: Paris When It Sizzles (1964) with Hepburn was shot in 1962 but given a much delayed release; The 7th Dawn (1964) with Capucine and Susannah York, a romantic adventure set during the Malayan Emergency produced by Charles K. Feldman; Alvarez Kelly (1966), a Western; and The Devil's Brigade (1968). He was also one of many stars in Feldman's Casino Royale (1967).

=== The Wild Bunch ===
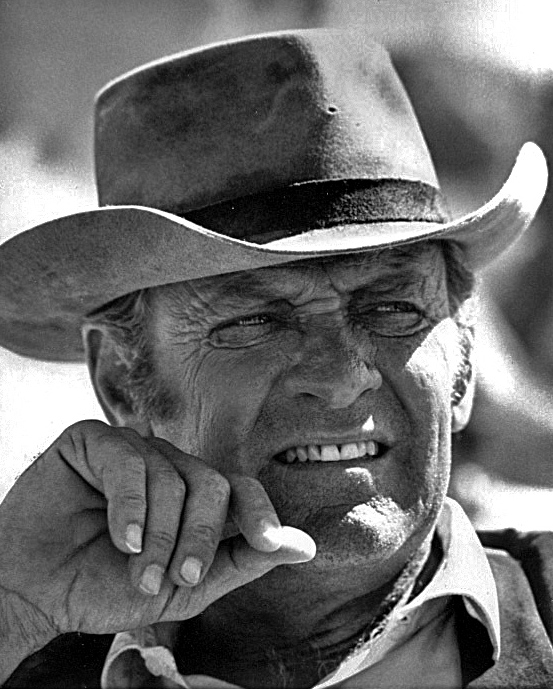
Holden in The Revengers (1972)

In 1969, Holden made a comeback when he starred in director Sam Peckinpah's graphically violent Western The Wild Bunch, winning much acclaim. Also in 1969, Holden starred in director Terence Young's family film L'Arbre de Noël, co-starring Italian actress Virna Lisi and French actor Bourvil, based on the novel of the same name by Michel Bataille. This film was originally released in the United States as The Christmas Tree and on home video as When Wolves Cry. Holden made a Western with Ryan O'Neal and Blake Edwards, Wild Rovers (1971). It was not particularly successful. Neither was The Revengers (1972), another Western.

For television roles in 1974, Holden won a Primetime Emmy Award for Outstanding Lead Actor in a Miniseries or a Movie for his portrayal of a cynical, tough veteran LAPD street cop in the television film The Blue Knight, based upon the bestselling Joseph Wambaugh novel of the same name.

In 1973, Holden starred with Kay Lenz in a movie directed by Clint Eastwood called Breezy, which was considered a box-office flop. Also in 1974, Holden starred with Paul Newman and Steve McQueen in the critically acclaimed disaster film The Towering Inferno, which became a box-office smash and one of the highest-grossing films of Holden's career.

Two years later, he was praised for his Oscar-nominated leading performance in Sidney Lumet's classic Network (1976), an examination of the media written by Paddy Chayefsky, playing an older version of the character type for which he had become iconic in the 1950s, only now more jaded and aware of his own mortality. Around this time he also appeared in 21 Hours at Munich (1976).

=== Final roles ===
Holden made a fourth and final film for Wilder with Fedora (1978). He followed it with Damien – Omen II (1978) and had a cameo in Escape to Athena (1978), which co-starred his real-life love interest Stefanie Powers. Holden had a supporting role in Ashanti (1979) and was third-billed in another disaster film, When Time Ran Out... (1980), which was a flop. Holden starred in The Earthling, as a loner dying of cancer in the Australian outback and accompanying an orphan boy (Ricky Schroder). After his final film Blake Edwards' S.O.B., with Julie Andrews, Holden declined to star in Jason Miller's film That Championship Season.

== Personal life ==
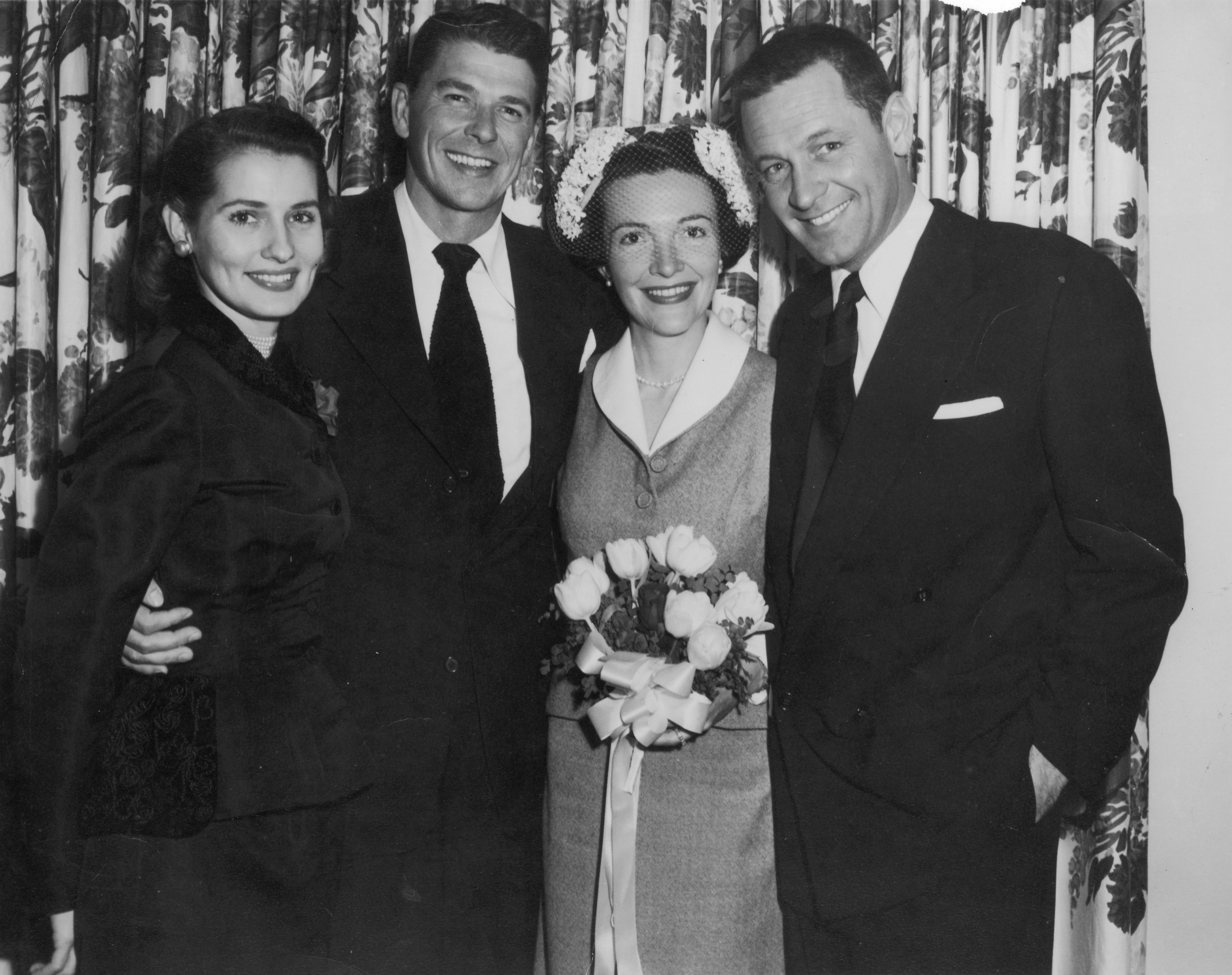
Matron of honor Brenda Marshall (left) and best man William Holden were the only guests at the 1952 wedding of Ronald and Nancy Reagan

Holden was best man at the wedding of his friend Ronald Reagan to actress Nancy Davis in 1952. Although a registered Republican, he never involved himself in politics.

Holden maintained a home in Switzerland and also spent much of his time working for wildlife conservation as a managing partner in an animal preserve in Africa. His Mount Kenya Safari Club in Nanyuki (founded 1959) was popular with the international jet set. On a trip to Africa, he fell in love with the wildlife and became increasingly concerned with the animal species that were beginning to decrease in population. With the help of his partners, he created the Mount Kenya Game Ranch and inspired the creation of the William Holden Wildlife Foundation.

=== Marriage and relationships ===
Holden was married to actress Brenda Marshall from 1941 until their divorce in 1971. They had two sons. Holden also adopted Marshall's daughter from Marshall's previous marriage to actor Richard Gaines.

Holden met French actress Capucine in the early 1960s. The two starred in the films The Lion (1962) and The 7th Dawn (1964). They reportedly began a two-year affair, which is alleged to have ended due to Holden's alcoholism. Capucine and Holden remained friendly until his death in 1981.

In 1972, Holden began a nine-year relationship with actress Stefanie Powers and sparked her interest in animal welfare. After his death, Powers set up the William Holden Wildlife Foundation at Holden's Mount Kenya Game Ranch.

=== Death ===
According to Thomas Noguchi's autopsy report, Holden bled to death in his apartment in Santa Monica, California, on November 12, 1981, after lacerating his forehead by slipping on a rug while intoxicated and hitting a bedside table. Forensic evidence recovered at the scene suggested that the actor was conscious for at least half an hour after the fall. His body was found four days later. Rumors circulated that he was suffering from lung cancer, which Holden had denied at a 1980 press conference. His death certificate makes no mention of cancer. He dictated in his will that his body be cremated by the Neptune Society and his ashes scattered in the Pacific Ocean. In accordance with his wishes, no funeral, or memorial service, was held.

President Ronald Reagan released a statement: "I have a great feeling of grief. We were close friends for many years. What do you say about a longtime friend – a sense of personal loss, a fine man. Our friendship never waned."

For his contribution to the film industry, Holden has a star on the Hollywood Walk of Fame located at 1651 Vine Street. He also has a star on the St. Louis Walk of Fame.

The song "Tom's Diner" by artist Suzanne Vega includes a line about "an actor who had died while he was drinking", and based on clues in the song, it was determined to be Holden, later confirmed by Vega herself.

== Filmography ==
=== Film ===
Film appearances by William Holden
Year	Title	Role	Notes
1938	Prison Farm	Prisoner	Uncredited
1939	Million Dollar Legs	Graduate	Uncredited
1939	Golden Boy	Joe Bonaparte	
1939	Invisible Stripes	Tim Taylor	
1940	Those Were the Days!	P.J. "Petey" Simmons	
1940	Our Town	George Gibbs	
1940	Arizona	Peter Muncie	
1941	I Wanted Wings	Al Ludlow	
1941	Texas	Dan Thomas	
1942	The Fleet's In	Casey Kirby	
1942	The Remarkable Andrew	Andrew Long	
1942	Meet the Stewarts	Michael Stewart	
1943	Young and Willing	Norman Reese	
1947	Blaze of Noon	Colin McDonald	
1947	Dear Ruth	Lt. William Seacroft	
1947	Variety Girl	himself	
1948	Rachel and the Stranger	Big Davey	
1948	Apartment for Peggy	Jason Taylor	
1948	The Dark Past	Al Walker	
1948	The Man from Colorado	Del Stewart	
1949	Streets of Laredo	Jim Dawkins	
1949	Miss Grant Takes Richmond	Dick Richmond	
1949	Dear Wife	Bill Seacroft	
1950	Father Is a Bachelor	Johnny Rutledge	
1950	Sunset Boulevard	Joe Gillis	
1950	Union Station	Lt. William Calhoun	
1950	Born Yesterday	Paul Verrall	
1951	Force of Arms	Sgt. Joe "Pete" Peterson	
1951	Submarine Command	LCDR Ken White	
1952	Boots Malone	Boots Malone	
1952	The Turning Point	Jerry McKibbon	
1953	Stalag 17	Sgt. J. J. Sefton	
1953	The Moon Is Blue	Donald Gresham	
1953	Forever Female	Stanley Krown	
1953	Escape from Fort Bravo	Capt. Roper	
1954	Executive Suite	McDonald Walling	
1954	Sabrina	David Larrabee	
1954	The Bridges at Toko-Ri	LT Harry Brubaker, USNR	
1954	The Country Girl	Bernie Dodd	
1955	Love Is a Many-Splendored Thing	Mark Elliott	
1955	Picnic	Hal Carter	
1956	The Proud and Profane	Lt. Col. Colin Black	
1956	Toward the Unknown	Maj. Lincoln Bond	
1957	The Bridge on the River Kwai	Cmdr. Shears	
1958	The Key	Capt. David Ross	
1959	The Horse Soldiers	Major Henry Kendall	
1960	The World of Suzie Wong	Robert Lomax	
1962	Satan Never Sleeps	Father O'Banion	
1962	The Counterfeit Traitor	Eric Erickson	
1962	The Lion	Robert Hayward	
1964	Paris When It Sizzles	Richard Benson/Rick	Shot in 1962, given delayed release
1964	The 7th Dawn	Major Ferris	
1966	Alvarez Kelly	Alvarez Kelly	
1967	Casino Royale	Ransome	Cameo appearance
1968	The Devil's Brigade	Lt. Col. Robert T. Frederick	
1969	The Wild Bunch	Pike Bishop	
1969	The Christmas Tree	Laurent Ségur	
1971	Wild Rovers	Ross Bodine	
1972	The Revengers	John Benedict	
1973	Breezy	Frank Harmon	
1974	Open Season	Hal Wolkowski	Cameo appearance
1974	The Towering Inferno	Jim Duncan	
1976	Network	Max Schumacher	
1978	Fedora	Barry "Dutch" Detweiler	
1978	Damien – Omen II	Richard Thorn	
1979	Escape to Athena	Prisoner	Uncredited cameo
1979	Ashanti	Jim Sandell	
1980	When Time Ran Out	Shelby Gilmore	
1980	The Earthling	Patrick Foley	
1981	S.O.B.	Tim Culley	Final film role
1986	Bring Me the Head of Charlie Brown	Charlie Brown	Archive audio recordings

=== Television ===
Television appearances by William Holden
Year	Title	Role	Notes
1955	Lux Video Theatre	Intermission Guest	Episode: "Love Letters"
1955	I Love Lucy	Himself	Episode: "L.A. at Last!"
1956	The Jack Benny Program	Himself	Episode: "William Holden/Frances Bergen Show"
1973	The Blue Knight	Bumper Morgan	Television film
1976	21 Hours at Munich	Chief of Police Manfred Schreiber	Television film

=== Radio ===
Radio appearances by William Holden
Year	Program	Episode/source
1940	Lux Radio Theatre	Our Town
1942	Lux Radio Theatre	I Wanted Wings
1945	Lux Radio Theatre	Christmas Holiday
1946	Lux Radio Theatre	Miss Susie Slagle's
1948	Lux Radio Theatre	Dear Ruth
1949	Lux Radio Theatre	Apartment for Peggy
1949	Lux Radio Theatre	Dear Ruth
1951	Lux Radio Theatre	Dear Wife
1951	Lux Radio Theatre	Love Letters
1951	Lux Radio Theatre	Sunset Boulevard
1951	Lux Radio Theatre	The Men
1952	Lux Radio Theatre	Union Station
1952	Lux Radio Theatre	Submarine Command
1952	Hollywood Star Playhouse	The Joyful Beggar
1953	Lux Radio Theatre	Appointment with Danger
1953	Lux Summer Theatre	High Tor

== Awards and nominations ==
Awards and nominations earned by William Holden
Year	Award	Category	Nominated work	Results	Ref.
1950	Academy Awards	Best Actor	Sunset Boulevard	Nominated	
1953	Academy Awards	Best Actor	Stalag 17	Won	
1976	Academy Awards	Best Actor	Network	Nominated	
1956	British Academy Film Awards	Best Foreign Actor	Picnic	Nominated	
1977	British Academy Film Awards	Best Actor in a Leading Role	Network	Nominated	
1951	Golden Apple Awards	Most Cooperative Actor	—N/a	Won	
1955	Golden Apple Awards	Most Cooperative Actor	—N/a	Won	
1953	Laurel Awards	Top Male Dramatic Performance	Stalag 17	Nominated	
1954	Laurel Awards	Top Male Comedy Performance	Sabrina	Won	
1957	Laurel Awards	Top Male Star	—N/a	4th Place	
1958	Laurel Awards	Top Male Star	—N/a	5th Place	
1959	Laurel Awards	Top Male Star	—N/a	7th Place	
1960	Laurel Awards	Top Male Star	—N/a	5th Place	
1960	Laurel Awards	Top Male Dramatic Performance	The World of Suzie Wong	Nominated	
1961	Laurel Awards	Top Male Star	—N/a	12th Place	
1962	Laurel Awards	Top Male Star	—N/a	14th Place	
1963	Laurel Awards	Top Male Star	—N/a	13th Place	
1940	National Board of Review Awards	Best Acting	Our Town	Won	
1942	National Board of Review Awards	Best Acting	The Remarkable Andrew	Won	
1976	National Society of Film Critics Awards	Best Actor	Network	2nd Place	
1952	New York Film Critics Circle Awards	Best Actor	Stalag 17	Nominated	
2010	Online Film & Television Association Awards	Film Hall of Fame: Actors	—N/a	Inducted	
1955	Photoplay Awards	Most Popular Male Star	—N/a	Won	
1956	Photoplay Awards	Most Popular Male Star	—N/a	Won	
1950	Picturegoer Awards	Best Actor	Sunset Boulevard	Nominated	
1974	Primetime Emmy Awards	Best Lead Actor in a Limited Series	The Blue Knight	Won	
1954	Venice Film Festival	Grand Jury Prize	Executive Suite	Won	

== Box-office ranking ==
For a number of years, exhibitors voted Holden among the most popular stars in the country:

- 1954 – 7th (US)
- 1955 – 4th (US)
- 1956 – 1st (US)
- 1957 – 7th (US)
- 1958 – 6th (US), 6th (UK)
- 1959 – 12th (US)
- 1960 – 14th (US)
- 1961 – 8th (US)
- 1962 – 15th (US)
