= Submarine Command =

1951 film by John Farrow

- Directed by: John Farrow
- Written by: Jonathan Latimer (story)
- Produced by: Joseph Sistrom
- Starring: William Holden; Nancy Olson; William Bendix
- Narrated by: William Holden
- Cinematography: Lionel Lindon
- Edited by: Eda Warren
- Music by: David Buttolph
- Distributed by: Paramount Pictures
- Release dates: December 6, 1951 (Los Angeles); January 19, 1951 (New York)
- Running time: 87 minutes
- Country: United States
- Language: English
- Box office: $1 million (U.S. rentals)

Submarine Command is a 1951 American war film directed by John Farrow and starring William Holden, Don Taylor, Nancy Olson, William Bendix and Darryl Hickman. It is notable as among the first films to acknowledge post-traumatic stress disorder.

== Plot ==
During the Pacific War, lieutenant commander Ken White orders the submarine USS Tiger Shark to crash dive to evade a Japanese aerial attack. Chief petty officer Boyer begs him to wait for commander Josh Rice, still topside, but White refuses, and his close friend Rice and the quartermaster are lost. When they resurface shortly afterward, they learn that the war is over. Boyer blames himself, although no one else holds him responsible.

White marries Carol and remains in the Navy after the war. He assigned to escort a reporter who sees the Tiger Shark and remembers the tragic story of the last day of the war, triggering White's feelings of guilt and straining his marriage. Boyer is assigned to White's unit and immediately requests a transfer. White assigns him to the Tiger Shark, which is being recommissioned. When a fire on the submarine traps a man in a compartment, Boyer wants to rescue him immediately, but White forces him to follow regulations and first don on a protective suit, fueling Boyer's hatred.

White is about to resign from the Navy to escape the ghosts of his past but changes his mind at the last moment, and Carol leaves him. North Korea invades South Korea that same day, starting the Korean War. White is given command of the Tiger Shark and sets sail from the Mare Island Naval Shipyard for the war as soon as the submarine is ready. Boyer is a disgruntled member of the crew.

When they rendezvous with an aircraft carrier, White is given a special mission. A colonel and his special intelligence unit are in possession of vital information but are prisoners of war. For the rescue mission, White will land men at two points to eliminate enemy coastal installations in advance of a paratrooper airborne assault on the prison camp. White's part of the raid is led by commander Peter Morris, a family friend. However, after depositing Morris's unit first, one of the Tiger Shark's engines overheats, endangering the timing of the second landing. To accelerate the attack, White takes a risk by entering the mined harbor. When he sees the signal that the mission has been successful, he surfaces in order to notify his admiral, although it exposes the submarine to fire from shore batteries. When the Tiger Shark is hit and starts sinking, White orders the crew to abandon ship. He and his men are rescued along with the freed prisoners.

His demons finally exorcised, White attends the launching of another Tiger Shark with his wife, their baby and Boyer.

== Cast ==
- William Holden as Cmdr. Ken White
- Nancy Olson as Carol
- William Bendix as CPO Boyer
- Don Taylor as Lt. Cmdr. Peter Morris
- Arthur Franz as Lt. Arnie Carlson
- Darryl Hickman as Ens. Jack Wheelwright
- Peggy Webber as Mrs. Alice Rice
- Moroni Olsen as Rear Adm. Joshua Rice
- Jack Gregson as Cmdr. Joshua Rice
- Jack Kelly as Lt. Paul Barton
- Don Dunning as Quartermaster Perkins
- Jerry Paris as Sgt. Gentry
- Charles Meredith as Adm. Tobias
- Philip Van Zandt as Gavin
- Gordon Polk as Ralph

== Production ==
Paramount contract player John Lund refused to appear in the film and was suspended by the studio.

Holden invested $20,000 of his own money into the film.

No ship of the United States Navy has ever borne the name USS Tiger Shark or Tigershark, but the name is popular for fictional submarines. and real submarines have been named USS Shark. The fictional Tiger Shark in the film has the hull number SS-306, which belonged to USS Tang (SS-306) (lost in 1944). USS Sterlet (SS-392), a Balao-class submarine, was used for the Tiger Shark.

The loss of a commanding officer on the bridge of a submarine was similar to the death of Commander Howard W. Gilmore on the USS Growler (SS-215) during the war.

== Reception ==
In a contemporary review for The New York Times, critic Bosley Crowther wrote:

[R]ather than dwell at great length on the nature of submarine war, it centers upon the wearying routine of naval life in time of peace. So long as it sticks to this area—to the psychological conflict in its man, distressed as he is by his conscience, by the cold contempt of an old hand in his crew and by the petty annoyances of a dreary desk job ashore—the story and the film are perpetually on the verge of an intriguing surprise. For the screen play by Jonathan Latimer is a compact and levelheaded job, the direction of John Farrow is naturalistic and the performers are uniformly good. ... But, unfortunately, the story goes sky high at the end in a purely theatrical blowout with the old ship in the Korean War. And also the psychological tension is completely and dismally relaxed in a blood-and-thunder adventure that has the officer recapturing his morale. It is disappointing to see a picture come so close and miss.

Critic Philip K. Scheuer of the Los Angeles Times wrote: "The performances lift 'Submarine Command' out of its more routine aspects. It's a fair-plus service film."

== Adaptation ==
Submarine Command was presented on Lux Radio Theatre November 17, 1952. The one-hour adaptation starred Holden and Alexis Smith.
