= Jackpot (unfinished film) =

Unfinished film

Jackpot is an unfinished film that began shooting in 1974 and shut down in 1975. Terence Young directed Millard Kaufman's screenplay. William D. Alexander produced for Paramount Pictures. Richard Burton, James Coburn, and Charlotte Rampling starred.

== Plot ==
Burton played Reid Lawerence, an actor. A media report claims that Burton would play an Academy Award-winning actor down on his luck who suddenly wins another Oscar. The film was to be shot in Rome and Nice. Another media report claims that the story was about "a famous actor" who "fakes a grave illness" to collect insurance money. One photo from the film production shows Burton in a hospital with both of his legs in casts, while another shows Burton in a wheelchair.

== Background ==
Young, Kaufman, Alexander and Burton had just finished making the troubled 1974 film The Klansman. Robert Mitchum was originally signed to co-star. Audrey Hepburn declined an offer to co-star.

One media report claims that the "insurance swindle thriller" stalled due to a lack of funds. Terence Young claimed that he could have finished the film if he had been able to get the three stars together for one more week.

== Bibliography ==
- Clark, Al (1983). The Film Year Book. Grove Press, an Evergreen book.
