= Evelyn Kennedy =

American music editor (1915–1990)

- Born: 1915; Amarillo, Texas
- Died: 1990; Santa Barbara, California
- Other name: Evelyn Kennedy Myers
- Occupation: Music editor
- Years active: 1955–1981
- Musical career
- Instruments: Piano; accordion

Evelyn Frances Kennedy Myers (1915 – 1990) was a music editor for the Walt Disney Company, where she contributed to over 100 movies, including Lady and the Tramp (1955), Sleeping Beauty (1959), Mary Poppins (1964), and The Jungle Book (1967).

== Biography ==
=== Early life ===
Evelyn Kennedy was born in Amarillo, Texas to Mr. and Mrs. E.T. Kennedy and studied at the Amarillo School of Music. There, she became a pupil of Lila Austin, who had studied under E. Robert Schmitz and Joseph Lhevine. On July 12, 1936, Kennedy married Austen Myers.

Kennedy was an accomplished pianist and accordionist, and began teaching at her alma mater. Kennedy held recitals for her students performing keys on stage. During World War II, Kennedy joined the United States Navy and was hired to be a stenographer typist for Walt Disney Productions, where they were commissioned to provide wartime propaganda.

=== Career at Disney ===
Because of World War II, the gender shift in the workforce had changed with women taking a larger role in the workplace. Breaking into the film industry, which was heavily male dominated, was difficult; however, Kennedy's skill solidified her position. She was hired by Walt Disney Productions in 1954, with her first film being Lady and the Tramp (1955). The film earned an estimated $6.5 million in distributor rentals within the United States and Canada. Over the next three decades, Kennedy collaborated with several musical composers, editing and compiling recorded dialogue, sound effects, and instrumental score music to match every visual cue for over 100 films.

In an interview with Richard Sherman (of the Sherman Brothers), he talks about his work-relationship with Evelyn Kennedy. "She was a bit older than me, so I was kind of like 'the kid' wandering around, but I was so interested in how she did it. She never let anybody [else] into her editing room where she worked with the Moviola – switching and pushing the film around to make it work. She had a little sign that said, 'Nobody can enter except Richard Sherman.' I was the one guy she would let come in. I was not supposed to talk, so I could just stand there and watch how she worked and how she did it. I was fascinated by it.... It was 'lessons' for me. I was learning so much in those days."

In 1977, when discussing her job as a film music editor, Kennedy's only lament was that she "there were more openings for young people looking for a career".

== Filmography ==
Year	Title	Notes
1955	Lady and the Tramp	
1955	The African Lion (Documentary)	
1955	Men Against the Arctic	
1956	Secrets of Life	
1957	Public Pigeon No. 1	
1957	Perri (Documentary)	
1957	Old Yeller	
1958	The Light in the Forest	
1958	White Wilderness (Documentary)	
1958	Tonka	
1959	Sleeping Beauty	
1959	The Shaggy Dog	
1959	Darby O'Gill and the Little People	
1960	Toby Tyler or Ten Weeks with a Circus	
1960	Pollyanna	
1960	Jungle Cat (Documentary)	
1960	The Hound That Thought He Was a Raccoon (Short)	
1960	Ten Who Dared	
1961	One Hundred and One Dalmatians	
1961	The Absent-Minded Professor	
1961	The Parent Trap	
1961	Nikki, Wild Dog of the North	
1961	Babes in Toyland	
1962	Moon Pilot	
1962	Bon Voyage!	
1962	Big Red	
1962	The Legend of Lobo (Documentary)	
1963	Son of Flubber	
1963	Summer Magic	
1963	Savage Sam	
1963	The Incredible Journey	
1963	The Three Lives of Thomasina	
1963	The Sword in the Stone	
1964	The Misadventures of Merlin Jones	
1964	A Tiger Walks	
1964	Mary Poppins	
1965	Those Calloways	
1965	That Darn Cat!	
1966	The Ugly Dachshund	
1966	Winnie the Pooh and the Honey Tree (Short)	Uncredited
1966	Lt. Robin Crusoe, U.S.N.	
1966	Follow Me, Boys!	
1963–1981	Walt Disney's Wonderful World of Color (TV series)	Archive footage
1967	Monkeys, Go Home!	
1967	The Adventures of Bullwhip Griffin	
1967	The Gnome-Mobile	
1967	The Jungle Book	
1967	The Happiest Millionaire	
1968	Blackbeard's Ghost	
1968	The One and Only, Genuine, Original Family Band	
1968	Never a Dull Moment	
1968	The Horse in the Gray Flannel Suit	
1968	Winnie the Pooh and the Blustery Day (Short)	Uncredited
1968	The Love Bug	
1969	Rascal	
1969	The Computer Wore Tennis Shoes	
1970	King of the Grizzlies	
1970	The Boatniks	
1970	The Aristocats	
1970	The Wild Country	
1970	The Courtship of Eddie's Father (TV series)	
1971	The Barefoot Executive	
1971	Scandalous John	
1971	The Million Dollar Duck	
1971	Bedknobs and Broomsticks	
1971	The Biscuit Eater	
1972	Napoleon and Samantha	
1972	Now You See Him, Now You Don't	
1972	Run, Cougar, Run	
1972	Snowball Express	
1973	The World's Greatest Athlete	
1973	Charley and the Angel	
1973	One Little Indian	
1973	Robin Hood	
1973	Superdad	
1974	Herbie Rides Again	
1974	The Bears and I	
1974	The Castaway Cowboy	
1974	The Island at the Top of the World	
1974	Winnie the Pooh and Tigger Too (Short)	Uncredited
1975	The Strongest Man in the World	
1975	Escape to Witch Mountain	
1975	The Apple Dumpling Gang	
1976	No Deposit, No Return	
1976	Treasure of Matecumbe	
1976	Gus	
1976	The Shaggy D.A.	
1976	Freaky Friday	
1977	The Many Adventures of Winnie the Pooh	
1977	The Rescuers	
1977	A Tale of Two Critters (Documentary)	
1977	Herbie Goes to Monte Carlo	
1977	Pete's Dragon	
1978	Return from Witch Mountain	
1978	The Cat from Outer Space	
1978	Hot Lead and Cold Feet	
1978	The Million Dollar Dixie Deliverance	
1978	The Small One (Short)	
1979	The North Avenue Irregulars	
1979	The Black Hole	
1980	The Last Flight of Noah's Ark	
1980	Herbie Goes Bananas	
1981	The Fox and the Hound	
1982	Tex	Supervising music editor Credited as Eve Kennedy
1983	Never Cry Wolf	Supervising music editor
1984	Splash	Supervising music editor
