= Flubber (franchise) =

American film franchise

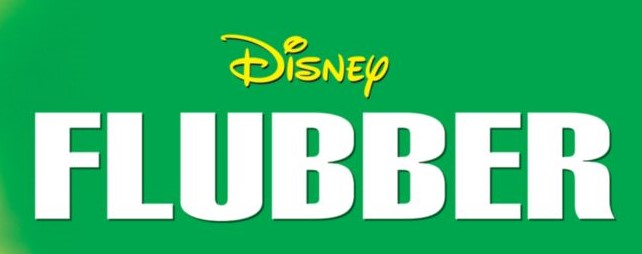
- Official franchise logo, released in 1997
- Based on: A Situation of Gravity by Samuel W. Taylor
- Starring: Fred MacMurray; Harry Anderson; Robin Williams; Various others; (See full list below)
- Production company: Walt Disney Pictures
- Distributed by: Walt Disney Studios Motion Pictures
- Country: United States
- Language: English
- Budget: $84,000,000 (total of 3 films)
- Box office: $225,488,045 (total of 3 films) (Note: These figures are based on the available numbers for the theatrical films. Though there are a total five movies, there is no financial information publicly available for the made-for-television films.)

The Flubber franchise consists of American science-fiction-comedy films, with three theatrical releases, and two made-for-television films. The overall story is based on the short story, A Situation of Gravity, written by Samuel W. Taylor in 1943. The plot of the films center around an absent-minded college professor (with differing names and played by various actors depending on the adaptation), who works tirelessly to find the next great invention. The Professor wants to make scientific history, while working to save the school at which he works, the Medfield College.

The two original films, starring Fred MacMurray, were financially and critically well-received. Years later during the '80s, a made-for-television remake was released as a part of The Magical World of Disney series, with a sequel that followed soon thereafter. By 1997, a theatrical remake, with the story adjusted for then-modern time, was developed with Robin Williams in the starring role.

Though each film was a financial success, not all were critical successes. Critics called the remake "a total dud", while others noted that the studio's attempt at relaunching the franchise resulted in "a cute, well-meaning, but ultimately disappointing movie". Several critics noted the film's overuse of slapstick comedy. In 1999 the Flubber films, along with a number of other Disney film series, were expanded as a franchise into the Walt Disney Parks attraction with elements included from each film.

== Films ==
=== Theatrical ===
Film	U.S. release date	Director(s)	Screenwriter(s)	Story by	Producer(s)
The Absent-Minded Professor	March 16, 1961	Robert Stevenson	Bill Walsh	Samuel W. Taylor	Bill Walsh
Son of Flubber	January 16, 1963	Robert Stevenson	Don DaGradi & Bill Walsh	Samuel W. Taylor	Walt Disney, and Bill Walsh
Flubber	November 26, 1997	Les Mayfield	John Hughes & Bill Walsh	John Hughes & Bill Walsh	John Hughes, and Ricardo Mestres

==== The Absent-Minded Professor (1961) ====
Professor Ned Brainard works endlessly in his lab, looking for the next greatest invention. His fiancée Betsy grows tired of being put second behind his experiments. Brainard forgets about their own wedding for the third time. However, he finds a scientific anomaly when he invents a revolutionary flying rubber, which he names Flubber. This substance proves to have various abilities. While he works to reconnect with Betsy, criminals led by Alonzo Hawk seek to steal his formula.

==== Son of Flubber (1963) ====
Professor Ned Brainard, who experienced a series of misfortunes up until his invention of the super-elastic substance called Flubber, works to find the next scientific discovery. He hopes to have a better experience with a gravity-defying derivative he names, Flubbergas. When the government steps in to obstruct his work, his wife Betsy expresses her concern and displeasure with his experiments stating that they need a divorce. After some alterations to his substance Brainard works to find the solution of his new invention, win back the confidence of his wife, resolve the government's concerns, and defeat the familiar nefarious acts of Alonzo Hawk.

==== Flubber (1997) ====
A loose remake of The Absent-Minded Professor, the plot follows a similar outline.

Professor Philip Brainard experiments to find new sources of energy, believing that the project can strengthen the finances of Medfield College. His girlfriend SaraJean works as President of the college and tries to support his tireless work in his laboratory. When his work uncovers a lively, super-stretchy, rubber-like substance that he names Flubber, the professor is so excited he absent-mindedly forgets his own wedding. SaraJean dumps him for his apparent lack of prioritization, so Brainard sets to work in winning her back. In the meantime, he discovers that Flubber has a mind of its own, and has a mischievous nature. All the while, some villainous people seek to steal the newly discovered substance for their own gain.

=== Television ===
Film	U.S. release date	Director(s)	Screenwriter(s)	Producer(s)
Disney's The Absent Minded Professor	November 27, 1988	Robert Scheerer	Richard Chapman & Bill Dial	Ric Rondell
Disney's The Absent Minded Professor: Trading Places	February 26, 1989	Robert Scheerer & Bob Sweeney	Richard Chapman & Bill Dial	Richard Chapman & Bill Dial

==== Disney's The Absent Minded Professor (1988) ====
Professor Henry Crawford, an absent-minded instructor at a college busily works in laboratory on various experiments. His girlfriend Ellie, grows frustrated when he repeatedly misses their dates and spends more time in his science lab than with her. One day Crawford makes an unprecedented discovery, in the form of rubber that defies gravity. The professor names the substance Flubber and hopes that he can prove he is a notable scientist, while also showing his love to his girlfriend.

==== Disney's The Absent-Minded Professor: Trading Places (1989) ====
Professor Henry Crawford is convinced by an ex-roommate and former colleague named Jack Brooker to switch professions. For the trade, Henry will go to work at the elusive Rhinebloom Labs and Jack will teach Henry's students. What Henry doesn't know is that Jack suspects that the lab may be involved in some illegal activity. When Henry tries investigate the situation through a computer, a virus named Albert is inadvertently released. The colleges discover that the program is a weapons system. Together, and with the help of Flubber, they work to stop the destructive software.

== Principal cast and characters ==
List indicators

This section includes characters who will appear or have appeared in the franchise in main roles.

- An empty grey cell indicates the character was not in the film, or that the character's official presence has not yet been confirmed.
- ^{V} indicates a voice-only role.

Character	Films				
Character	Theatrical			Television	
Character	The Absent-Minded Professor	Son of Flubber	Flubber	Disney's The Absent Minded Professor	Disney's The Absent Minded Professor: Trading Places
Flubber	Appeared	Appeared	Scott Martin Gershin^{V}	Appeared	Appeared
Professor Ned Brainard	Fred MacMurray	Fred MacMurray			
Professor Phillip Brainard			Robin Williams		
Professor Henry Crawford				Harry Anderson	Harry Anderson
Elizabeth "Betsy" Carlisle-Brainard	Nancy Olson	Nancy Olson			
Professor Shelby Ashton	Elliott Reid	Elliott Reid			
Alonzo Hawk	Keenan Wynn	Keenan Wynn			
A.J. Allen	Ed Wynn	Ed Wynn			
Defense Secretary	Edward Andrews	Edward Andrews			
Jeffrey Daggett	Leon Ames	Leon Ames			
Sara Jean Reynolds-Brainard			Marcia Gay Harden		
Weebo			Jodi Benson^{V}		
Weebo			Leslie Stefanson (Note: Portrays the characters holographic human form, known as Sylvia.)		
Professor Wilson Croft			Christopher McDonald		
Chester Hoenicker			Raymond J. Barry		
Bennett Hoenicker			Wil Wheaton		
Smith			Clancy Brown		
Wesson			Ted Levine		
Ellen Whitley-Crawford				Mary Page Keller	Mary Page Keller
Dr. Jack Broker					Ed Begley, Jr.
The Hacker					Ron Fassler

== Additional crew and production details ==
Film	Crew/Detail					
Film	Composer	Cinematographer	Editor(s)	Production companies	Distributing companies	Running time
The Absent-Minded Professor	George Bruns	Edward Colman	Cotton Warburton	Walt Disney Productions	Buena Vista Distribution Company	1hr 32mins
Son of Flubber	George Bruns	Edward Colman	Cotton Warburton	Walt Disney Productions	Buena Vista Distribution Company	1hr 40mins
Disney's The Absent Minded Professor	Tom Scott	Isidore Mankofsky	Tom Stevens & Jerry Temple	Walt Disney Television, Echo Cove Productions	Buena Vista Pictures, Buena Vista Television	2hrs
Disney's The Absent Minded Professor: Trading Places	John Massari	information unavailable	information unavailable	The Walt Disney Company	The Walt Disney Company	1hr
Flubber	Danny Elfman	Dean Cundey	Harvey Rosenstock & Michael A. Stevenson	Walt Disney Pictures, Great Oaks Entertainment	Buena Vista Pictures	1hr 33mins

== Reception ==
=== Box office and financial performance ===
Film	Box office gross			Box office ranking		Budget	Ref.
Film	North America	Other territories	Worldwide	All time North America	All time worldwide	Budget	Ref.
The Absent-Minded Professor	not available	not available	$25,381,407	#3,123	#4,309	$2,000,000	
Son of Flubber	not available	not available	$22,129,412	#3,400	#4,654	$2,000,000	
Disney's The Absent Minded Professor	—N/a	—N/a	—N/a	—N/a	—N/a	not available	—N/a
Disney's The Absent-Minded Professor: Trading Places	—N/a	—N/a	—N/a	—N/a	—N/a	not available	—N/a
Flubber	$92,977,226	$85,000,000	$177,977,226	No. 814	#1,111	$80,000,000	
Totals	≙$92,977,226	≙$85,000,000	225,488,045	~x̄ #2,447 (Note: This is an approximate average, based on the all-time standing of each theatrically released film.)	~x̄ #3,358 (Note: This is an approximate average, based on the all-time standing of each theatrically released film.)	$84,000,000	

=== Critical and public response ===
Film	Critical		Public
Film	Rotten Tomatoes	Metacritic	CinemaScore
The Absent-Minded Professor	82% (22 reviews)	75 (5 reviews)	—N/a
Son of Flubber	86% (7 reviews)	—N/a	—N/a
Disney's The Absent Minded Professor	—N/a	—N/a	—N/a
Disney's The Absent-Minded Professor: Trading Places	—N/a	—N/a	—N/a
Flubber	24% (34 reviews)	37 (19 reviews)	B+

== Theme park attraction ==
In 1999, the theme of Journey into Imagination was changed and re-titled to include Figment. The ride features Dr. Nigel Channing, from Honey, I Shrunk the Audience!, who "hosts" an area known as the Imagination Institute. The story states that Channing's grandfather established the institute, while the area features references to Dr. Philip Brainard from Flubber, as well as Wayne Szalinski from the Honey, I Shrunk the Kids franchise and Dean Higgins (Joe Flynn's role in the Dexter Riley films). Walt Disney and Thomas Edison also make an appearance.

== Related films ==
The Medfield College appears in the Flubber franchise as a primary location of plot events. The fictional college appears in two other Disney film franchises, including The Shaggy Dog, and the Dexter Riley film series, while Alonzo Hawk, the villain of the original Flubber films, appears in the second Herbie film, Herbie Rides Again. Collectively, the four separate film series take place within the same fictional universe. Additionally, the Merlin Jones film series take place at the in-universe sister-school, Midvale College, while The World's Greatest Athlete is set at the related academic school of Merrivale College.

Film	U.S. release date	Director	Screenwriter(s)	Story by	Producer(s)
The Shaggy Dog film series
The Shaggy Dog	March 19, 1959	Charles Barton	Lillie Hayward & Bill Walsh	Lillie Hayward & Bill Walsh	Walt Disney and Bill Walsh
The Shaggy D.A.	December 17, 1976	Robert Stevenson	Don Tait	Don Tait	Bill Anderson
The Return of the Shaggy Dog	November 1, 1987	Stuart Gillard	Paul Haggis & Diane Wilk	Paul Haggis & Diane Wilk	Harvey Marks
The Shaggy Dog	March 10, 2006	Brian Robbins	Cormac Wibberley & Marianne Wibberley and Geoff Rodkey and Jack Amiel & Michael Begler		David Hoberman and Tim Allen
Merlin Jones film series
The Missadventures of Merlin Jones	February 11, 1964	Robert Stevenson	Tom August & Helen August	Bill Walsh	Walt Disney and Ron Miller
The Monkey's Uncle	August 18, 1965	Robert Stevenson	Tom August & Helen August	Tom August & Helen August	Walt Disney and Ron Miller
Dexter Riley film series
The Computer Wore Tennis Shoes	December 31, 1969	Robert Butler	Joseph L. McEveety	Joseph L. McEveety	Bill Anderson
Now You See Him, Now You Don't	July 12, 1972	Robert Butler	Joseph L. McEveety	Robert L. King	Ron Miller
The Strongest Man in the World	February 6, 1975	Vincent McEveety	Joseph L. McEveety & Herman Groves	Joseph L. McEveety & Herman Groves	Bill Anderson
Other films
The World's Greatest Athlete	February 1, 1973	Robert Scheerer	Dee Caruso and Gerald Gardner	Dee Caruso and Gerald Gardner	Bill Walsh
