= 1961 in American television =

This is a list of American television-related events in 1961.

== Events ==
Date	Event	Ref.
January 20	President John F. Kennedy becomes the first president to be inaugurated with a color telecast. NBC's news division provided coverage in color.	
January 25	John F. Kennedy held the first live televised presidential press conference.	
March 5	The launch of the spacecraft Freedom 7 in a 15-minute sub-orbital spaceflight is seen by 45 million American television viewers. Alan B. Shepard becomes the first U.S. astronaut in space. He was the second person to travel into space, following the Soviet cosmonaut Yuri Gagarin.	
May 5	In a speech on "Television and the Public Interest" to the National Association of Broadcasters, Federal Communications Commission chairman Newton N. Minow describes commercial television programming as a "vast wasteland" and tells the broadcasters that they could do a better job of serving the public.	
May 29	Dave Garroway announces that he would be leaving the Today show on NBC.	
July 1	The Brighter Day airs its first episode after moving to Los Angeles from New York City. The move also marks the writing out of Baby Dennis and his love interest, because the actors who played them didn't want to relocate.	
September 23	NBC begins its long-running series of movie presentations under the umbrella banner, NBC Saturday Night at the Movies. The first movie to be broadcast was the 1953 film How to Marry a Millionaire, starring Marilyn Monroe.	
November 19	Lucille Ball marries Gary Morton	

=== Other events in 1961 ===
- The Sports Broadcasting Act was passed into law.

== Television programs ==
=== Debuts ===
Date	Debut	Network
January 1	The Dick Tracy Show	Broadcast syndication
January 5	Mister Ed	Broadcast syndication
January 20	You're in the Picture	CBS
January 23	The Americans	NBC
January 30	The Yogi Bear Show	Broadcast syndication
February 9	Gunslinger	CBS
February 27	Acapulco	NBC
March 17	Five Star Jubilee	NBC
March 31	'Way Out	CBS
April	The Ernie Kovacs Show	ABC
April 2	The Asphalt Jungle	ABC
April 29	Wide World of Sports	ABC
May 8	Whispering Smith	NBC
June 3	Ripcord	Broadcast syndication
July 6	Great Ghost Tales	NBC
July 14	Westinghouse Preview Theatre	NBC
September 1	Tales of the Wizard of Oz	Broadcast syndication
September 17	Car 54, Where Are You?	NBC
September 17	The DuPont Show of the Week	NBC
September 17	Follow the Sun	ABC
September 19	Cain's Hundred	NBC
September 20	The Joey Bishop Show	NBC
September 25	87th Precinct	NBC
September 26	Ichabod and Me	CBS
September 26	The Dick Powell Show	NBC
September 27	Top Cat	ABC
September 28	Hazel	NBC
September 29	Target: The Corruptors!	ABC
October 1	Bus Stop	ABC
October 2	Ben Casey	ABC
October 2	Password	CBS
October 2	Window on Main Street	CBS
October 3	Calvin and the Colonel	ABC
October 3	The Dick Van Dyke Show	CBS
October 3	The New Breed	ABC
October 4	The Alvin Show	CBS
October 4	Mrs. G. Goes to College	CBS
October 5	Frontier Circus	CBS
October 5	The Investigators	CBS
October 5	The New Bob Cummings Show	CBS
October 6	The Hathaways	ABC
October 6	Straightaway	ABC
October 9	The Everglades	Broadcast syndication
October 10	Alcoa Premiere	ABC
October 11	The Bob Newhart Show	NBC
October 12	Margie	ABC
December 11	The Mike Douglas Show	Broadcast syndication

=== Changes of network affiliation ===
Show	Moved from	Moved to
Walt Disney Presents	ABC	NBC
The Detectives	ABC	NBC
Rocky and His Friends	ABC	NBC
The Wonderful World of Disney	ABC	NBC
Bachelor Father	NBC	ABC
Mister Ed	Syndication	CBS

=== Ending this year ===
Date	Show	Network	Debut	Notes
January 2	Riverboat	NBC	September 12, 1959	
January 6	Dan Raven	NBC	September 23, 1960	
January 27	You're in the Picture	CBS	January 20, 1961	
February 9	Take a Good Look	ABC	October 22, 1959	
February 13	Klondike	NBC	October 10, 1960	
March 29	Wanted Dead or Alive	CBS	September 6, 1958	
March 30	The Ann Sothern Show	CBS	October 6, 1958	
March 31	DuPont Show of the Month	CBS	September 24, 1957	
April 3	The DuPont Show with June Allyson	CBS	September 21, 1959	
April 7	Happy	NBC	June 8, 1960	
April 12	My Sister Eileen	CBS	October 5, 1960	
April 16	Omnibus	NBC	November 9, 1952 (on CBS)	
April 17	Sugarfoot	ABC	September 17, 1957	
April 24	Acapulco	NBC	February 27, 1961	
April 30	The Tab Hunter Show	NBC	September 18, 1960	
May 1	The Play of the Week	NTA Film Network	October 12, 1959	
May 15	The Americans	NBC	January 1961	
May 18	Dick Powell's Zane Grey Theatre	CBS	October 5, 1956	
May 23	The Tom Ewell Show	CBS	September 27, 1960	
May 31	Peter Loves Mary	NBC	October 12, 1960	
June 1	Bat Masterson	NBC	October 8, 1958	
June 3	Gunslinger	CBS	February 9, 1961	
June 17	Lock-Up	Syndication	September 26, 1959	
June 18	The Rebel	ABC	October 4, 1959	
June 25	The Asphalt Jungle	CBS	April 2, 1961	
June 27	Stagecoach West	ABC	October 4, 1960	
June 27	The Life and Legend of Wyatt Earp	ABC	September 6, 1955	
June 29	The Ford Show	NBC	October 4, 1956	
July 1	The Deputy	NBC	September 12, 1959	
July 3	Bringing Up Buddy	CBS	October 10, 1960	
July 4	Alcoa Presents One Step Beyond	ABC	January 20, 1959	
July 14	'Way Out	CBS	March 31, 1961	
July 16	Shirley Temple's Storybook	CBS	January 12, 1958	
September 9	The Adventures of Spunky and Tadpole	First-run Syndication	September 6, 1958	
September 18	Peter Gunn	NBC	September 22, 1958	
September 21	Great Ghost Tales	NBC	July 6, 1961	
September 22	Five Star Jubilee	NBC	March 17, 1961	
September 22	The Lawless Years	NBC	April 22, 1959	
September 22	Westinghouse Preview Theatre	NBC	July 14, 1961	
September 23	Sea Hunt	First-run Syndication	January 4, 1958	
September 28	Frontier Justice	CBS	July 7, 1958	
October 20	The Quick Draw McGraw Show	First-run Syndication	September 28, 1959	
October 30	Whispering Smith	NBC	May 8, 1961	
December 1	The Huckleberry Hound Show	First-run Syndication	September 29, 1958	
December 15	Sam and Friends	WRC-TV (Washington, D.C.)	May 9, 1955	
December 28	The Investigators	CBS	October 5, 1961	
December 30	Matty's Funday Funnies	ABC	October 11, 1959	
Unknown date	Shotgun Slade	Syndication	October 24, 1959	
Unknown date	This Is Your Life	NBC	October 1, 1952	

=== Network launches ===
Network	Type	Launch date	Notes
Christian Broadcasting Network	Religious-formatted television network	October 1	First religious broadcasting network in the United States

=== Network closures ===
Network	Type	End date	Notes
NTA Film Network	Broadcast	November	Launched in October 1956, the NTA Film Network was another attempt to create a fourth television network in the wake of the closing of the DuMont Television Network two months prior. The network relied on filming the programming before sending it to air on its affiliates.

== Networks and services ==
=== Closures ===
Network	Type	Closure date	Notes	Source
NTA Film Network	Cable television	November		

== Television stations ==
=== Station launches ===
Date	City of License/Market	Station	Channel	Affiliation	Notes/Ref.
January 21	Idaho Falls, Idaho	KIFI	8	NBC (primary); ABC (secondary)	
January 30	Phoenix, Arizona	KAET	9	NET	
February 1	Hot Springs, Arkansas	KFOY-TV	9	NBC	
February 6	Portland, Oregon	KOAP-TV	10	NET	Flagship of Oregon Public Broadcasting
February 27	Douglas, Arizona	KCDA	3	Independent	
March 29	Kansas City, Missouri	KCSD-TV	19	NET	
June 18	Beaumont, Texas	KBMT	12	ABC	
July 5	Vermillion, South Dakota	KUSD-TV	2	NET	Later became the flagship of the South Dakota Public Broadcasting television network
July 22	Charlotte Amalie, U.S. Virgin Islands	WBNB-TV	10	CBS (primary); NBC (secondary)	First licensed television station in the Virgin Islands
August 7	Elk City, Oklahoma	KSWB	8	CBS	
September 5	Charlotte, North Carolina	WUTV	36	ABC (primary); NBC/CBS (secondary)	
September 16	Louisville, Kentucky	WLKY	32	ABC	
September 25	Tacoma, Washington	KTPS	28	NET	
September 27	Norfolk, Virginia	WHRO-TV	15	NET	
October 2	Washington, D.C.	WETA	26	NET	
October 3	Medford, Oregon	KMED-TV	10	NBC (primary); ABC (secondary)	
October 10	Richland, Washington	KNDU	25	ABC (primary); NBC (secondary)	
November 5	New York City	WUHF	31	Independent	
November 6	Carbondale, Illinois	WSIU-TV	15	NET	
November 13	Augusta/Portland, Maine	WCBB	10	NET	Maine's first educational station; now part of the Maine Public Broadcasting Network
November 19	Waycross/Valdosta, Georgia	WXGA-TV	8	NET	Part of the Georgia Public Broadcasting television network
November 27	Hilo, Hawaii	KHAW-TV	11	NBC	Satellite of KONA (now KHON-TV)/Honolulu
December 18	Flagstaff, Arizona	KVLS	13	Independent	
December 18	Fresno, California	KAIL	53	Independent	

=== Network affiliation changes ===
Date	City of license/Market	Station	Channel	Old affiliation	New affiliation	Notes/Ref.
April 2	Milwaukee, Wisconsin	WISN-TV	12	ABC	CBS	
April 2	Milwaukee, Wisconsin	WITI	6	CBS (primary); NTA Film Network (secondary)	ABC (exclusive)	
September 16	Louisville, Kentucky	WAVE	3	NBC (primary); ABC (secondary)	NBC (exclusive)	
October 3	Klamath Falls, Oregon	KOTI	2	NBC (primary); ABC (secondary)	ABC (primary); NBC (secondary)	
October 3	Medford, Oregon	KOBI	5	CBS (primary); ABC/NBC (secondary)	CBS (primary); ABC (secondary)	
Unknown date	Lexington, Kentucky	WKYT-TV (formerly WKXP-TV)	27	CBS (exclusive)	ABC (primary); CBS (secondary)	
Unknown date	Mankato, Minnesota	KEYC-TV	12	NBC	CBS	
Unknown date	Ogden, Utah	KVOG-TV	9	NTA Film Network	Independent	

=== Station closures ===
Date	City of license/Market	Station	Channel	Affiliation	First air date	Notes/Ref.
February 16	Fort Pierce, Florida	WTVI	19	CBS	November 23, 1960	
August	Douglas, Arizona	KCDA	3	Independent	February 27, 1961	
August	Rochester, New York	WVET-TV	10	CBS/ABC	November 1, 1953	Merged operations with current CBS affiliate WHEC-TV

== Sources ==
- Brooks, Tim; Marsh, Earle F. (2009). The Complete Directory to Prime Time Network and Cable TV Shows, 1946-Present. Random House. ISBN 9780307483201.
- Burgess, Colin (2014). Freedom 7: The Historic Flight of Alan B. Shepard Jr. Springer-Praxis books in space exploration. New York; London: Springer. ISBN 978-3-319-01155-4. OCLC 902685533.
- Swenson, Loyd S. Jr.; Grimwood, James M.; Alexander, Charles C. (1966). This New Ocean: A History of Project Mercury. The NASA History Series. Washington, DC: National Aeronautics and Space Administration. OCLC 569889. NASA SP-4201. Archived from the original on June 17, 2010.
