= Gil Lamb =

American actor (1904–1995)

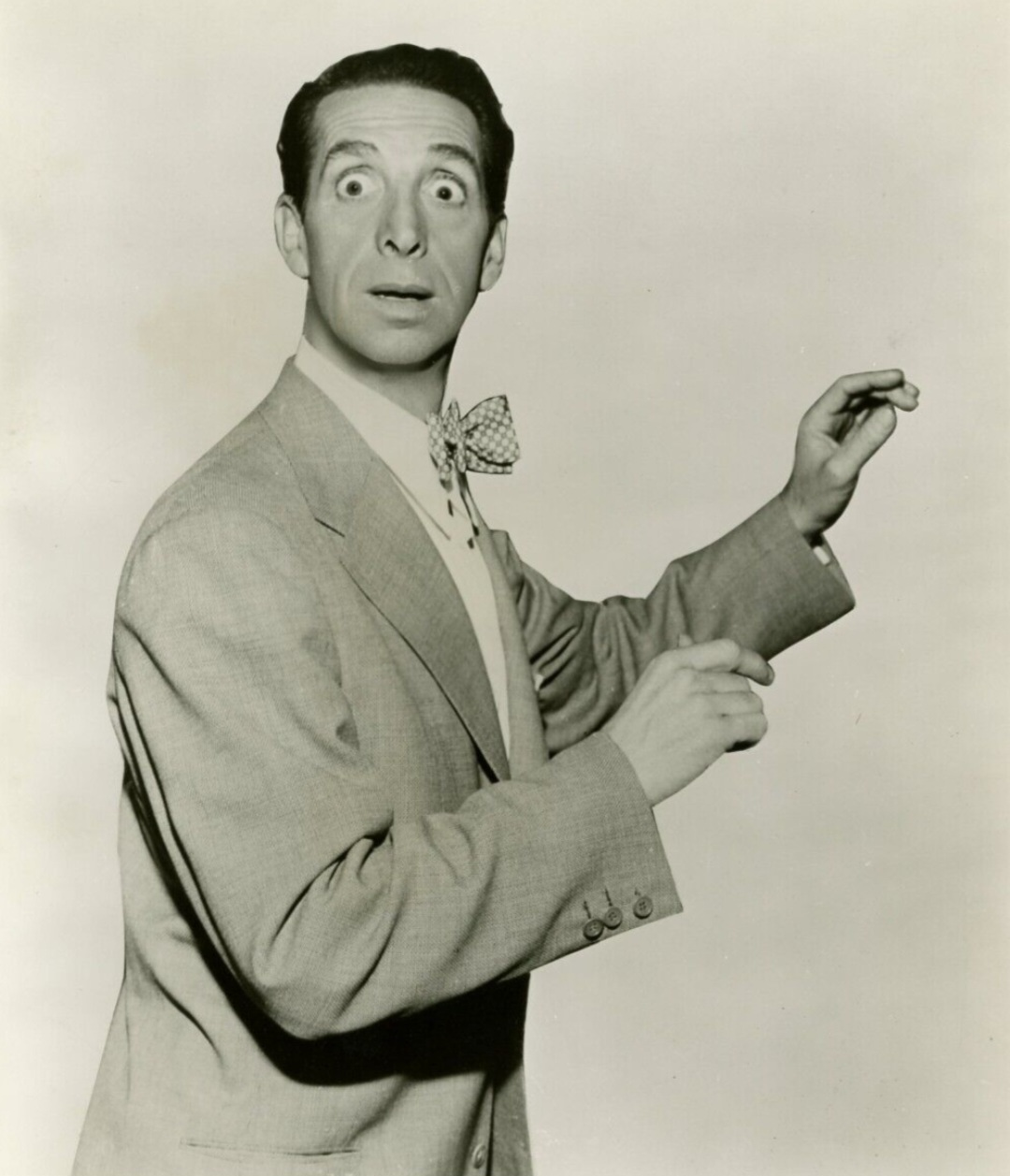
- Lamb in 1950
- Born: Gilbert L. Lamb; June 14, 1904; Minneapolis, Minnesota, U.s.
- Died: November 2, 1995 (aged 91); Riverside, California, U.S.
- Occupation: Actor
- Years active: 1935–1980

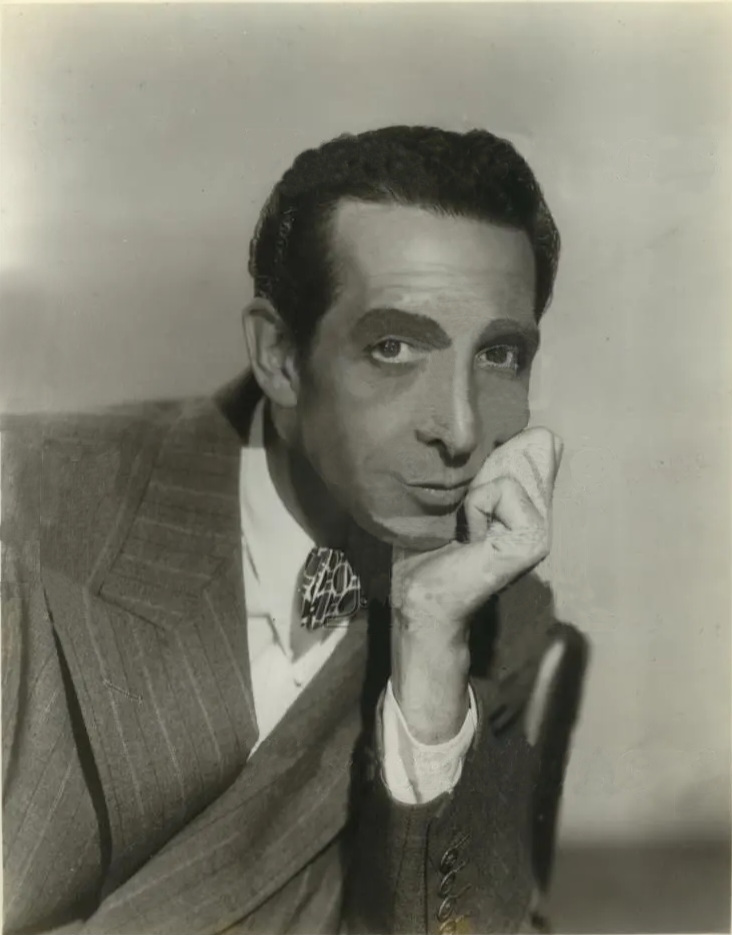
Gil Lamb, 1947

Gilbert L. Lamb (June 14, 1904 – November 2, 1995) was an American actor. He appeared in more than 60 films and television shows between 1935 and 1980.

Lamb was born on June 14, 1904, in Minneapolis, Minnesota. He was the son of Mr. and Mrs. J. A. Lamb, and he attended East High School and the University of Minnesota.

Lamb's entertainment career began in vaudeville, where his act "had a wonderful assortment of trick props". He followed that format with a harmonica act, which he performed across the United States and in most European countries before World War II.

Lamb was also a stage actor, who appeared in several musicals on Broadway, including Folies Bergère (1939), Hold on to Your Hats (1940-1941), Sleepy Hollow (1948), and 70, Girls, 70 (1971). He performed at The Muny in St. Louis in 1935 and 1936. His films included Hit Parade of 1947.

In addition to his work as an entertainer, Lamb owned a restaurant in New York and was part-owner of a New York company that built theatrical props.

== Death ==
Lamb died on November 2, 1995, in Riverside, California, aged 91.

== Selected filmography ==
- The Fleet's In (1942) - Spike
- Star Spangled Rhythm (1942) - High Pockets
- Riding High (1943) - Bob 'Foggy' Day
- Rainbow Island (1944) - Pete Jenkins
- Practically Yours (1944) - Albert W. Beagell
- Hit Parade of 1947 (1947) - Eddie Page
- Make Mine Laughs (1949) - Master of Ceremonies
- Joe Palooka in Humphrey Takes a Chance (1950) - Martin
- The Boss (1956) - Henry
- Terror in a Texas Town (1958) - Barnaby (uncredited)
- Bells Are Ringing (1960) - Pratfalling Party Guest (uncredited)
- Breakfast at Tiffany's (1961) - Gil - Party Guest with Harriet (uncredited)
- Bye Bye Birdie (1963) - Lanky Shriner
- Good Neighbor Sam (1964) - Drunk (uncredited)
- The Ugly Dachshund (1966) - Milkman (uncredited)
- The Gnome-Mobile (1967) - Gas Attendant
- Blackbeard's Ghost (1968) - Waiter
- The Shakiest Gun in the West (1968) - Slosh White - Drunk (uncredited)
- The Horse in the Gray Flannel Suit (1968) - Bit Comic (uncredited)
- The Love Bug (1968) - Policeman at Park
- The Boatniks (1970) - Mr. Mitchell
- Norwood (1970) - Mr. Remley
- Nightmare Circus (1974) - Mr. Alvarez
- Day of the Animals (1977) - Old Man in Bar
