= The Boatniks =

1970 film

- Theatrical release poster
- Directed by: Norman Tokar
- Written by: Arthur Julian
- Story by: Mary Roth
- Produced by: Ron Miller
- Starring: Robert Morse; Stefanie Powers; Phil Silvers; Norman Fell; Mickey Shaughnessy; Wally Cox
- Cinematography: William E. Snyder
- Edited by: Cotton Warburton
- Music by: Bruce Belland; Robert F. Brunner; Franklyn Marks
- Production company: Walt Disney Productions
- Distributed by: Buena Vista Distribution
- Release date: July 1, 1970
- Running time: 100 minutes
- Country: United States
- Language: English
- Box office: $18,607,492

The Boatniks is a 1970 American comedy film directed by Norman Tokar and starring Robert Morse, Stefanie Powers, Don Ameche and Phil Silvers. It was made by Walt Disney Productions, released by Buena Vista Distribution.

Young and awkward, Coast Guard Ensign Thomas Garland (Morse) suffers from the comparison with his late father, a war hero, which does not prevent him from falling for pretty Kate Fairchild (Powers), a young woman who manages a sailing school. Of course, the way he expresses his deep feelings for the lady leaves much to be desired, and the situation does not improve when a trio of bumbling jewel thieves interferes.

Wally Cox had a supporting role playing a man who manages a boat for girls to give parties for the purposes of socializing with men.

== Plot ==
Lieutenant Jordan, U.S. Coast Guard, responds to a number of pleas for help from civilian pleasure boat sailors around Southern California's Balboa Island. This type of event is typical of what the Coast Guard deals with on a regular basis, and it is one of the reasons why Jordan has requested to transfer to a new station. He is handing over the reins to Ensign Tom Garland, a polite but remarkably clumsy fellow who will now report to Commander Taylor, a man who fought in World War II with Garland's father and holds him in high regard.

Garland's ineptitude as the new skipper of the cutter Point Maley is revealed. He repeatedly mishandles various minor issues plaguing impatient travelers on the crowded waterways. Despite his growing reputation, he quickly falls for Kate Fairchild, manager of a local boat rental and sailing school. In their initial meeting, Garland accidentally dumps a can of paint on her head.

A trio of jewel thieves are making their way to Mexico while pursued by authorities. Ringleader Harry Simmons poses as a yacht club commodore and dispatches orders to his two associates, Charlie and Max, as they prepare to smuggle stolen jewels inside an assortment of hollowed food. They rent a boat from Kate, although none of them know how to sail. A picnic hamper with the jewel-laden food falls overboard and the trio makes repeated unsuccessful attempts to retrieve it.

They finally hire a professional pearl diver, Chiyoko Kuni, who appears not to speak English but does recover the goods. Then, in perfect English, she demands many times the agreed fee.

After witnessing their suspicious behavior, Kate and Tom suspect that the trio are the three men sought by police. Commander Taylor does not believe it. Ultimately, Tom is able to convince Taylor to retrieve the stolen jewels and ensure that the jewel thieves are arrested.

== Cast ==
- Robert Morse as Ensign Garland
- Stefanie Powers as Kate Fairchild
- Phil Silvers as Harry Simmons
- Norman Fell as Max
- Mickey Shaughnessy as Charlie
- Wally Cox as Jason
- Don Ameche as Commander Taylor
- Joey Forman as Lt. Jordan
- Vito Scotti as Pepe Galindo
- Tom Lowell as Wagner
- Bob Hastings as Chief Walsh
- Sammy Jackson as Garlotti
- Joe E. Ross as Nutty Sailor
- Judith Jordan as Tina
- Al Lewis as Bert
- Midori Arimoto as Chiyoko Kuni
- Kelly Thordsen as Motorcycle Cop
- Gil Lamb as Mr. Mitchell

== Music ==
The film's theme song, "Boatniks," was written by Bruce Belland and Robert F. Brunner.

== Release ==
The Boatniks was released on July 1, 1970 at the Ziegfeld Theatre in New York City. The film's initial release included the animated short It's Tough to Be a Bird and the live-action short Hang Your Hat on the Wind. The film was re-released theatrically on June 10, 1977.

=== Home media ===
The Boatniks was released through VHS on April 7, 1984. The film was released on DVD on August 2, 2005. On June 21, 2016, The Boatnik was released on Blu-ray disc as a Disney Movie Club exclusive, 45th Anniversary Edition.

== Reception ==
In 1970, the film earned an estimated $5 million in North American rentals. By 1976 this figure was up to $6.6 million.

Roger Greenspun of The New York Times wrote that the film "isn't a good movie about boating, and it doesn't really try to be. It isn't good situation comedy either, though it does try to be." Variety wrote: "There's nothing that isn't familiar about the comedy in this Disney summer release, but it's so well handled that even anticipated gags come through with honors." Kevin Thomas of the Los Angeles Times called it "a better than usual Disney comedy. It wisely involves a lot of very good people in a series of mishaps of which they make the absolute most." The Monthly Film Bulletin wrote: "Characteristically wholesome Disney comedy, quite enjoyable on its own unsophisticated level though not in the same class as The Love Bug, mainly because of a surfeit of dialogue (and a consequent lack of sight gags) and Robert Morse's slight unease in conveying the central character's easygoing amiability."

== See also ==
- List of American films of 1970
