= The Million Dollar Dixie Deliverance =

1978 Disney television film

- Genre: Historical adventure
- Written by: Lawrence Montaigne
- Directed by: Russ Mayberry
- Starring: Brock Peters; Kyle Richards; Ben Jones
- Composer: Irwin Kostal
- Country of origin: United States
- Original language: English

Production
- Executive producer: Ron W. Miller
- Producer: Jerome Courtland
- Production company: Walt Disney Productions

Original release
- Network: NBC
- Release: February 5, 1978

The Million Dollar Dixie Deliverance is a 1978 American television film produced by Walt Disney Productions for The Wonderful World of Disney. Directed by Russ Mayberry, it aired on NBC on February 5, 1978.

The film, set during the American Civil War, was written by Lawrence Montaigne and produced by Jerome Courtland.

The film was executive produced by Ron W. Miller, art direction by John B. Mansbridge and Jack T. Collis, assistant director was Bill Lukather, (father of Steve Lukather), technical advisor was Dent "Wildman" Myers, special effects by Danny Lee, music by Irwin Kostal, and the music editor was Evelyn Kennedy.

Ben Jones, who later served in the United States House of Representatives, appeared in the film as Sgt. Bingham.

The Dispatch called it "a dandy movie in the Walt Disney tradition. It artfully combines adventure, suspense, sentiment and humor". The Garden City Telegram referred to it as "an exciting Civil War action-drama", and The San Bernardino Sun called out the "picturesque reconstructed 1850s town".

Materials from the film are preserved at Washington University in St. Louis.

== Cast ==
The cast includes:

- Brock Peters as Zechariah
- Kyle Richards as Naomi
- Ben Jones as Sgt. Bingham
- Grace Zabriskie as Widow Cummins
- Christian Juttner as Timmy
- Sonny Shroyer as Luke
- Kip Niven as Lt. Ames
- Ernie Lively as Denny
- Joe Dorsey as Capt. Guthrie
- Mary Nell Santacroce as Miss Carlyle
- Clayton Landey as the Confederate Soldier
- Charles Courtland as Henry
- Alicia Fleer as Jessica
- Christian Berrigan as Daniel
- Kenneth Daniel as Pvt. Taggart
- Stuart Culpepper as Ike
- Richard Reiner as Poole
- Kermit Echols as Farmer
- Frank Rickman as Sentry
- Henry Blankenship as Bartender
- Mike Vines as Morgan
- Raylon C. Ruggles as the Drummer Boy
