= The Boy with Green Hair =

1948 American fantasy-drama film

- Theatrical release poster
- Directed by: Joseph Losey
- Screenplay by: Ben Barzman; Alfred Lewis Levitt
- Based on: "The Boy with Green Hair"; 1946 story in This Week by Betzi Beaton
- Produced by: Dore Schary; Adrian Scott
- Starring: Pat O'Brien; Robert Ryan; Barbara Hale; Dean Stockwell; Richard Lyon
- Cinematography: George Barnes
- Edited by: Frank Doyle
- Music by: Leigh Harline; Constantin Bakaleinikoff
- Production company: RKO
- Distributed by: RKO Radio Pictures
- Release date: November 27, 1948 (U.S.)
- Running time: 82 minutes
- Country: United States
- Language: English
- Budget: $900,000 or $800,000

The Boy with Green Hair is a 1948 American fantasy drama film directed by Joseph Losey in his feature film directorial debut, from a screenplay by Ben Barzman and Alfred Lewis Levitt. Based on a 1946 short story by Betzi Beaton, the film stars Dean Stockwell as Peter Fry, a young war orphan who is subject to ridicule after his hair mysteriously turns green. The cast also features Pat O'Brien, Robert Ryan, and Barbara Hale.

After a production fraught with several clashes between Losey and RKO Pictures head Howard Hughes, The Boy with Green Hair was released on November 27, 1948. It was a financial disappointment but was well-received by critics. The theme song, "Nature Boy" by eden ahbez, also proved a hit.

== Plot ==
Finding a curiously silent young runaway boy whose head has been completely shaved, small-town police call in a psychologist who discovers that the boy is a war orphan named Peter Fry. Peter tells the story of his life to the psychologist.

After staying with a series of neglectful aunts and uncles, he is sent to live with an understanding retired actor named Gramp. Peter starts attending school and begins living the life of a normal boy, until his class gets involved with trying to help war orphans in Europe and Asia.

Peter soon discovers that, like the children on the posters whose images haunt him, he too is a war orphan. The realization about his parents and the work helping the orphans makes Peter turn very serious, and he is further troubled when he overhears the adults around him talking about the world preparing for another war. The next day, after having a bath, Peter is drying his hair with a towel when, to his astonishment, he sees that his hair has turned green. After being taunted by the townspeople and his peers, he runs away.

Suddenly, appearing before him in a lonely part of the woods, are the orphaned children whose pictures he saw on the posters. They tell him that while he is a war orphan, his green hair can make a difference and he must tell people that war is dangerous for children. He leaves determined to deliver this message to any and all. Upon his return, the townspeople, upset about a boy who is now different, urge Gramp to encourage Peter to consider shaving his hair so that it might grow back normally. Peter returns to the woods looking for the orphan children from the posters, but is chased by a group of boys from school who attempt to cut his hair.

He later decides to get his head shaved and the town barber does the job. However, Peter leaves home in the middle of the night, wearing a baseball cap and carrying a baseball bat.

Back in the present, Peter finishes his story. The psychologist tells him that when someone really believes something, they don't run away. Peter leaves and is reunited with Gramp in the station's waiting room. Gramp reads him a letter written by his father, intended for his 16th birthday. Peter's father relates his beliefs about how some things are worth dying for, and if people forget, to "remind them, Peter." Encouraged to keep sharing his message, Peter is sure that his hair will grow back in green again. The psychologist tells Dr. Knudson that he does not care whether the boy's hair was ever actually green or not, but that he agreed with what the boy had to say. Gramp and Peter go home.

== Cast ==
- Pat O'Brien as Gramp Fry
- Robert Ryan as Dr. Evans
- Barbara Hale as Miss Brand
- Dean Stockwell as Peter Fry
- Richard Lyon as Michael
- Walter Catlett as The King
- Samuel S. Hinds as Dr. Knudson
- Charles Meredith as Mr. Piper
- Regis Toomey as Mr. Davis
- David Clarke as Barber
- Billy Sheffield as Red
- Johnny Calkins as Danny
- Teddy Infuhr as Timmy
- Dwayne Hickman as Joey
- Eilene Janssen as Peggy

Dale Robertson, William Smith, Russ Tamblyn, and Frank Mazzola appear, but are not credited. It was Tamblyn's movie debut.

== Themes ==
Thematically, Losey hoped to establish a sharp visual contrast between "the reality of the town" and its conformist residents with the “dreamlike” forested glade where the war orphans deliver their plea for universal peace. He conceived of a “dream-like transformation” between these two realms emulating the startling transition between the black-and-white and color sequences in Victor Fleming’s The Wizard of Oz (1939). RKO declined to provide resources to create this effect.

Losey expressed regret that the town scenes were not shot on location, so as to contrast with the studio-built fantasy glade scenes.

Biographer Foster Hirsch argues that the anti-war message is “really irrelevant.” Losey’s treatment is less about war and more about an American establishment’s demand for social conformity:

[T]he primal fear of difference which the film dramatizes has only marginal connections to the general issue of “war,” but powerful links to the contemporary hunt for Communists.”

Hirsch adds that the topic of “insidious conformity” anticipates director Don Siegel’s Invasion of the Body Snatchers (1956).

Palmer and Riley observe that “the boy’s green hair [is] more effective as a symbol of individuality” than as a metaphor suggesting “renewal or peace.”

== Production ==
The Boy With the Green Hair was generously financed by RKO Pictures studios, having one of the biggest budgets of Losey’s film career. The film is based on a short story by Betzi Beaton, first published in The Week in 1946. According to director Joseph Losey, "the original story was a fantasy about racial discrimination," but it was eventually rewritten as an allegorical anti-war story, with the message that war always damages children.

The making of the film was fraught with delays and studio interference. Shortly after executive producer Dore Schary at RKO enlisted Losey to direct this screenplay in 1947, production manager Adrian Scott was subpoenaed by the HUAC, and the project was put on hold. When filming was finally underway, Schary was fired by RKO owner Howard Hughes. Through this period Losey was actively defending the blacklisted Hollywood Ten accused of Communist affiliations. During post-production, Hughes demanded the film be re-edited to tone down its perceived left-wing themes, and had additional footage shot without Losey's involvement. However after reviewing the revised cut, RKO vice-president Ned Depinet decided to reverse the changes. According to Losey, the only changes made to the final version were a "few extra lines off screen were stuck in in an attempt to soften the message."

Political controversy was the defining factor in Losey’s film at the outset of his career: “[T]he political turmoil of the late forties and early fifties in America eventually turned him from a Hollywood director into an expatriate director.” Losey fled to England in 1951 when he became a target for investigation by the HUAC.

=== Music ===
The song "Nature Boy" written by eden ahbez and sung by an uncredited chorus was a primary theme of the score for the motion picture. Nat King Cole's version of "Nature Boy" shot to No. 1 on the Billboard charts, and remained there for eight weeks straight during the summer of 1948.

== Release ==
Losey claimed the premiere was delayed by six months due to the conflict with Howard Hughes. The film premiered in Boston on November 25, 1948.

=== Home media ===
The film was released on DVD on December 1, 2009, and on Blu-ray on May 30, 2023 as part of the Warner Archive Collection.

== Reception ==
=== Critical response ===
Film industry trade magazine The Exhibitor praised the film as "well-directed and well acted," but expressed skepticism of the film's commercial appeal due to "an apparent audience dislike of pictures with messages." The film recorded a loss of $420,000.

Jane Lockhart, writing in The Rotarian, considered it "an earnest effort that didn't quite come off" and stated that "its message somehow comes out as vague and unresolved, as if the makers couldn't quite make up their minds as to what they were trying to say."

Bosley Crowther of The New York Times gave praise to Stockwell and O'Brien's performances, with the other actors being "adequate." Crowther criticized the lack of clarity in regards to the boy's hair, stating that as a plot device it is "banal" and "strangely inconclusive" and that he was not certain whether the green hair was a figment of the boy's imagination or if "it is intended as a strictly whimsical device." Crowther concluded that "the gesture falls short of its aim."

Although the film was passed with a 'U' certificate by the British Board of Film Censors on November 26, 1948, its UK release was held back until June 19, 1950.

=== Retrospective appraisal ===
Film critic Dan Callahan in Senses of Cinema credits producer Dore Schary for achieving this enduring “message” film in the form of “an allegory about war and intolerance.” Losey delivers “an extreme attack on conformity that condemns war and nuclear weapons.”

Critic Foster Hirsch offers a critique on Losey’s use of metaphors:

Losey’s use of symbols is as awkward, and as technically immature, as the handling of the fantasy episodes…visual signaling is frequently overloaded, blunt, artless. But the film does demonstrate for the way ideas and states of mind can be communicated visually.

Hirsch adds that “there are indications of the kind of composition and use of camera that Losey will develop and refine in his subsequent work.”

Critics James Palmer and Michael Riley note that The Boy With the Green Hair resonates to this day as an “antiracist, pro-peace allegory or fable,” surviving contemporary efforts by RKO’s anti-communist Howard Hughes to undermine its message.

On the film review aggregation website Rotten Tomatoes, the film has an 80% positive review score, based on 10 reviews.

=== Best-of lists ===
The film is recognized by American Film Institute in 2004's AFI's 100 Years...100 Songs list: "Nature Boy" – Nominated

== In popular culture ==
The 2009 film Battlestar Galactica: The Plan, which also starred (the adult) Dean Stockwell, made extensive reference to The Boy with Green Hair. Director Edward James Olmos, a fan of Stockwell's earlier film, had a replica of Peter's costume created for a war orphan character in The Plan named John. Olmos stated that he wanted John to have green hair, but the studio refused to allow it.

Stockwell's voice acting of Tim Drake in the DC Animated Universe film Batman Beyond: Return of the Joker would also draw inspiration from his performance in this film.

== See also ==
- Dondi

== Sources ==
- Callahan, Dan. 2003. Losey, Joseph. Senses of Cinema, March 2003. Great Directors Issue 25. Accessed 12 October 2024.
- Hirsch, Foster. 1980. Joseph Losey. Twayne Publishers, Boston, Massachusetts. ISBN 0-8057-9257-0
- Palmer, James and Riley, Michael. 1993. The Films of Joseph Losey. Cambridge University Press, Cambridge, England. ISBN 0-521-38386-2
