= Hit Parade of 1947 =

1947 film by Frank McDonald

- Theatrical release poster
- Directed by: Frank McDonald
- Screenplay by: Mary Loos
- Story by: Parke Levy
- Produced by: Frank McDonald
- Starring: Eddie Albert; Constance Moore; Joan Edwards; Gil Lamb; Bill Goodwin; William Frawley
- Cinematography: John Alton
- Edited by: Tony Martinelli
- Music by: Score: Nathan Scott; Songs: Jimmy McHugh (music); Harold Adamson (lyrics)
- Production company: Republic Pictures
- Distributed by: Republic Pictures
- Release date: March 22, 1947
- Running time: 90 minutes
- Country: United States
- Language: English

Hit Parade of 1947 is a 1947 American musical comedy film directed by Frank McDonald and written by Mary Loos. The film stars Eddie Albert, Constance Moore, Joan Edwards, Gil Lamb, Bill Goodwin and William Frawley. The film was released on March 22, 1947, by Republic Pictures.

== Cast ==
- Eddie Albert as Kip Walker
- Constance Moore as Ellen Baker
- Joan Edwards as Joan
- Gil Lamb as Eddie Page
- Bill Goodwin as Rod Huntley
- William Frawley as Harry Holmes
- Richard Lane as Serial Director
- Frank Fenton as Mr. Bonardi
- Ralph Sanford as Small
- Frank J. Scannell as Sammy
- Woody Herman and His Orchestra as Woody Herman Orchestra
- Roy Rogers as Roy Rogers
- Bob Nolan as Bob Nolan
- Sons of the Pioneers as Sons of the Pioneers
- Hugh Farr as Hugh Farr
- Karl Farr as Karl Farr
- Tim Spencer as Tim Spencer
- Doye O'Dell as Doye O'Dell
