= Westinghouse Preview Theatre =

American television anthology series

- Genre: Anthology series
- Country of origin: United States
- Original language: English
- No. of seasons: 1
- No. of episodes: 11

Production
- Running time: 30 minutes

Original release
- Network: NBC
- Release: July 14 – September 22, 1961

Westinghouse Preview Theatre is an American anthology television series that aired on NBC in the summer of 1961 The 30-minute episodes consisted of unsold television pilots for situation comedies and one musical program.

== Background ==
The practice of television executives of ordering dozens of pilots for proposed television series each year – far more than their networks could possibly broadcast as series – created a sizable body of unsold pilots that had never aired. Packaging these unsold pilots in anthology series and airing them during the summer provided television networks with a way of both providing fresh programming during the summer rerun season and recouping at least some of the expense of producing them. Westinghouse Preview Theatre was one of these series, aired by NBC in the summer of 1961. It consisted of 10 unsold pilots for situation comedies and one musical program.

== Broadcast history ==
Westinghouse Preview Theatre ran for 11 episodes over the course of 11 consecutive weeks in the summer of 1961, airing on NBC from 9:30 to 10:00 p.m. Eastern Time on Friday evenings. It premiered on July 14, and its last episode aired on September 22.

== Episodes ==
No.	Title	Directed by	Written by	Original release date
1	"Five's a Family"	Unknown	Unknown	July 14, 1961
A retired detective joins his son, who also is a detective, in the hunt for an arsonist. Starring Joe E. Brown, Dick Foran, and Petite Michel.
2	"Harry's Business"	Unknown	Unknown	July 21, 1961
A small-town pharmacist in Kansas has his first date with a woman after an automobile accident strands her in his community. Starring Ray Walston and Elena Verdugo.
3	"The McGonigle"	Ralph Murphy	Dick Chevillat, Dan Gallery, & Ray Singer	July 28, 1961
Two United States Navy sailors try to help a USO entertainer meet up with her husband so that they can have a honeymoon. Starring Mickey Shaughnessy, Tom D'Andrea, Frank Gerstle, Wally Cassell, Charlie Picerni, Norman Grabowski, Mark Damon, and Diane Jergens.
4	"I Married a Dog"	Unknown	Phil Rapp	August 4, 1961
After a man marries in haste, he discovers that his new wife has a clever pet poodle named Jonah that performs in movies, and that he must compete with the dog for her attention. Jonah takes an immediate dislike to his owner's new husband, and tries to convince other humans that the man is trying to kill him by limping whenever other people are around and by throwing himself into a bathtub. Starring Hal March.
5	"Innocent Jones"	Unknown	Unknown	August 11, 1961
A spoof of international adventure dramas in which the "hero" — a free-lancer writer who travels the world in search of stories — is really much more of a coward, as becomes evident when he lets a woman get him involved with a group of notorious counterfeiters . Starring Chris Warfield and Merry Anders.
6	"Shore Leave"	Unknown	Unknown	August 18, 1961
Two trouble-prone sailors in the peacetime United States Navy try to serve out their enlistments without getting in too much trouble for their antics. Starring Paul Gilbert and Peter Marshall.
7	"Happily Ever After"	Norman Z. McLeod	John L. Greene & Philip Shuken	August 25, 1961
Two families face the challenge of living under one roof after a newlywed couple that experiences a financial setback is forced to move in with the bride's parents. Starring Olive Sturges, John Armstrong, Catherine McLeod, Walter Coy, Rita Lynn, Cheryl Holdridge, Steven Terrell, Mary Ellen Terry, Ned Weaver, Olan Soule, and Michael Ross.
8	"The Jan Clayton Show"	Unknown	Unknown	September 1, 1961
A widow who is a dedicated professor of English studies in a small college town in the Midwestern United States and often goes out of her way to help her students falls in love with a man during her summer vacation. Starring Jan Clayton and Tom Helmore.
9	"Picture Window"	Rod Amateau	Unknown	September 8, 1961
A satirical look at suburban life through the eyes of a happily married couple. Starring Mary LaRoche and Charles Stewart.
10	"The Benny Goodman Show"	Unknown	Unknown	September 15, 1961
A performance of swing music by Benny Goodman and his band, filmed in Anaheim, California. The only episode of Westinghouse Preview Theatre that was not the unsold pilot for a situation comedy.
11	"Heave Ho Harrigan"	Unknown	Unknown	September 22, 1961
After a brief and disastrous tour of duty as a signalman aboard an aircraft carrier, a United States Navy seaman receives a new assignment from his commanding officer, which is to give three visiting Soviet scientists a tour of a submarine — and he accidentally kidnaps one of them. Starring Myron McCormick, Darryl Hickman, and Allyn Joslyn.
