= Mickey Shaughnessy =

American actor (1920–1985)

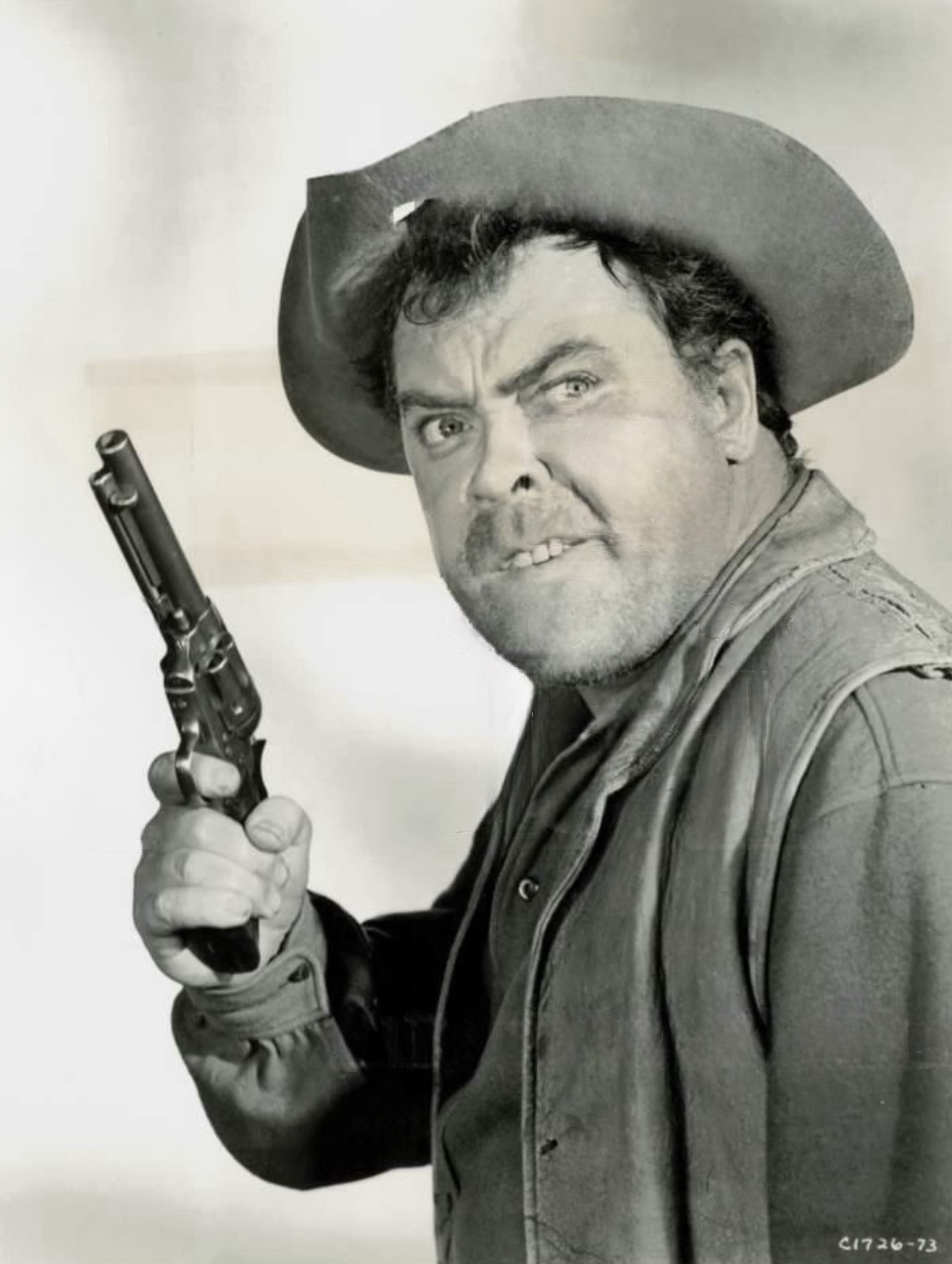
- Shaughnessy in The Sheepman (1958)
- Born: Joseph C. Shaughnessy; August 5, 1920; New York City, U.S.
- Died: July 23, 1985 (aged 64); Cape May Court House, New Jersey, U.S.
- Occupations: Actor, comedian
- Years active: 1952–1985
- Spouse: Sarah Shaughnessy (19??–1985; his death)
- Children: 7

Joseph C. Shaughnessy (August 5, 1920 – July 23, 1985), better known as Mickey Shaughnessy, was an American actor and comedian.

== Early life ==
Joseph C. Shaughnessy was born in New York City. He began in show business working as a singer at resorts, and became a comedian when he saw that the pay was better. He also was a Golden Gloves boxer.

He served in World War II and appeared in a U.S. Army revue called "Stars and Gripes". After the war, a Columbia Pictures producer saw him performing on stage and offered him a screen test. His screen debut was in the 1952 film The Marrying Kind.

== Career ==
Shaughnessy, who was six feet tall and weighed 210 pounds, played "tough, colorful characters" in films like From Here to Eternity, where he played the amiable Sergeant Leva. He also appeared in Jailhouse Rock as Elvis Presley's character's prison mentor, and in Designing Woman (1957) as a punch-drunk ex-boxer who could only sleep with his eyes open.

As a performer, he won critical praise for roles that might have otherwise been overlooked. Writing in The New York Times, film critic Bosley Crowther said that Shaughnessy's role in The Sheepman (1958) was the "item to be most grateful for", and called him "a slag heap of pot-belly, wounded dignity and scowls."

His final roles included a part in Walt Disney's The Boatniks. He also appeared in the 1971 series Chicago Teddy Bears, a comedy about a speakeasy in the 1920s.

According to the Los Angeles Times, Shaughnessy once said that he always kept in mind "the old Irishman--the guy who refuses the dentist's novocain. He sits there and takes out his rosary and offers up the pain for his sins."

He also worked in radio and television and had a nightclub act.

== Later years ==
In his later years, Shaughnessy lived in Wildwood, New Jersey. He continued his nightclub act until nearly the end of his life. He died July 23, 1985, aged 64, in Cape May Court House, New Jersey of lung cancer. He was survived by his wife Sarah, his sister Alice Shaughnessy, four daughters and three sons.

== Credits ==
=== Feature films ===
- The Princess and the Pirate (1944) – Man who brings the beers (uncredited)
- The Marrying Kind (1952) – Pat Bundy
- Last of the Comanches (1953) – Rusty Potter
- From Here to Eternity (1953) – Sgt. Leva
- Conquest of Space (1955) – Sgt. Mahoney
- Designing Woman (1957) – Maxie Stultz
- The Burglar (1957) – Dohmer
- Slaughter on Tenth Avenue (1957) – Solly Pitts
- Until They Sail (1957) – US Marine, Store Customer
- Jailhouse Rock (1957) – Hunk Houghton
- Don't Go Near the Water (1957) – Farragut Jones
- The Sheepman (1958) – Jumbo McCall
- Gunman's Walk (1958) – Deputy Sheriff Will Motely
- A Nice Little Bank That Should Be Robbed (1958) – Harold 'Rocky' Baker
- The Hangman (1959) – Al Cruse
- Ask Any Girl (1959) – Mr. Eager – Man Smoking Cigarette (uncredited)
- Don't Give Up the Ship (1959) – Stan Wychinski
- Edge of Eternity (1959) – Scotty O'Brien
- The Adventures of Huckleberry Finn (1960) – The Duke
- College Confidential (1960) – Sam Grover
- Sex Kittens Go to College (1960) – Boomie
- North to Alaska (1960) – Peter Boggs
- Dondi (1961) – Sergeant
- The Big Bankroll (1961) – Jim Kelly
- The McGonigle (1961 TV movie) – Mac McGonigle
- Pocketful of Miracles (1961) – Junior
- How the West Was Won (1962) – Deputy Stover
- Mickey and the Contessa (1963 TV movie) – Mickey Brennan
- A Global Affair (1964) – Police Officer Dugan
- A House Is Not a Home (1964) – Police Sergeant Riordan
- Never a Dull Moment (1968) – Francis
- St. Patrick's Day TV Special (1969)
- Vernon's Volunteers (1969 TV movie)
- My Dog, the Thief (1969) – Foley
- The Boatniks (1970) – Charlie
- Touched (1983) – Himself

=== Television ===
- Alcoa Presents: One Step Beyond (1960, episode "The Clown") – Pippo the Clown
- Westinghouse Preview Theatre (1961, episode "The McGonigle") – Mickey McGonigle
- Maverick (1962, episode "Mr. Muldoon's Partner") – Mr. Muldoon
- The Virginian (1962, episode "Big Day, Great Day") – Muldoon (credited as Michael Shaughnessy)
- Going My Way (1963, episode "The Slasher") – Jim Bancroft
- Laredo (1965, episode "Pride of the Rangers") – Monahan
- The Legend of Jesse James (1966, episode "South Wind") – Ab Truxton
- Run for Your Life (1967, episode "Rendezvous in Tokyo") – Morgan
- The Chicago Teddy Bears (1971, three episodes) – Lefty
