= Alan Hewitt =

American actor (1915–1986)

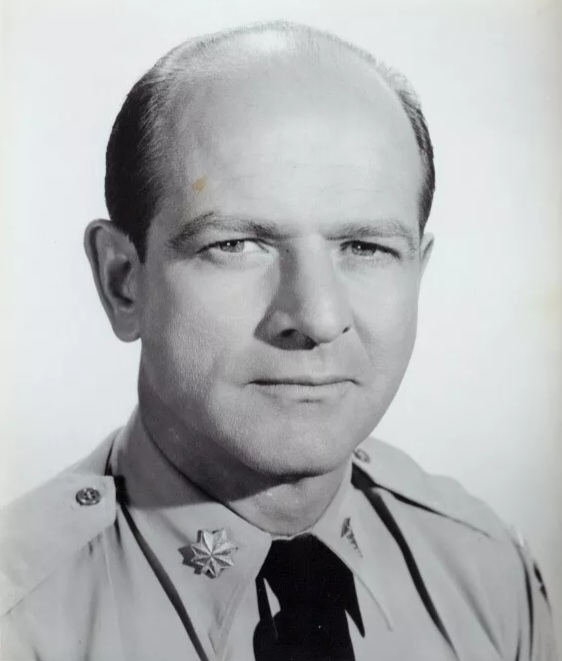
- Hewitt in A Private's Affair (1959)
- Born: January 21, 1915; New York City, U.S.
- Died: November 7, 1986 (aged 71); New York City, U.S.
- Resting place: Union Field Cemetery, Ridgewood, New York
- Education: Dartmouth College
- Occupation: Actor
- Years active: 1954–1978

Alan Hewitt (January 21, 1915 – November 7, 1986) was an American film, television, and stage actor. His most prominent TV roles were Detective Brennan in My Favorite Martian and the district attorney in How to Murder Your Wife.

== Early years ==
Hewitt was born and educated in New York City and entered Dartmouth College when he was 15, graduating in 1934. His acting debut was in a school production at age 10.

== Stage ==
Hewitt first appeared on the New York stage in The Taming of the Shrew in 1935, starring Alfred Lunt and Lynn Fontanne. He later toured with them in that play. in 1936–37, he appeared again with Lunt and Fontanne in productions of Amphitryon 38 and The Sea Gull. His obituary in The New York Times noted that he "scored his biggest successes on Broadway in William Saroyan's Love's Old Sweet Song and John Steinbeck's The Moon Is Down."

During World War II Hewitt served in the US Army's Armed Forces Radio Service from 1943 to 1946.

== Film ==
Among the movies Hewitt appeared in are A Private's Affair, That Touch of Mink, Days of Wine and Roses, Follow That Dream, How to Murder Your Wife, Sweet Charity, and The Barefoot Executive.

== Television ==
Hewitt was an accomplished character actor who had a lengthy career, including parts in well-known programs, including Alfred Hitchcock Presents, Maverick, 77 Sunset Strip, Daktari, Leave It to Beaver, The Donna Reed Show, Dr. Kildare, Lost in Space, Bewitched, I Dream of Jeannie, Hazel, The Lucy Show, F Troop, The Wild Wild West, Ironside, The Bob Newhart Show, Dennis the Menace, The Cara Williams Show, My Favorite Martian, and The Phil Silvers Show. He made four guest appearances on Perry Mason. He appeared in 1959's "The Case of the Golden Fraud". in 1961 he played Bruce Sheridan in "The Case of the Wintry Wife" and Dr. Marcus Tate in "The Case of the Brazen Bequest". In 1965 he played the role of Curt Ordway in "The Case of the Fatal Fetish".

== Actors' Equity Association ==
Hewitt became a member of Actors' Equity Association in 1934, gaining membership on its council in 1940. He served on the council until 1951 and was also on several committees during that span. An obituary noted, "He helped to establish the employment survey for performers in the American theater and frequently wrote letters and articles about actors' rights as professionals."

== Death ==
Hewitt died of cancer on November 7, 1986, at Memorial Sloan Kettering Cancer Center in New York City. He is interred in Union Field Cemetery, Ridgewood, New York. He was survived by his mother, Hortense B. (Baum) Hewitt (1892–1988) of Englewood, N.J., and a brother, Robert W. Hewitt (1919–2013) of Hillsdale, N.J. His father William predeceased him by about 40 years.

== Papers ==
Hewitt's papers were donated to Dartmouth College by his estate. The material housed at the Dartmouth College Library includes "programs, scripts, clippings, sides, reviews, correspondence, playbills, photographs and tapes." It occupies 22 boxes.

== Filmography & Television ==
- Alfred Hitchcock Presents (1956) (Season 1 Episode 35 "The Legacy") - Howard Cole
- Alfred Hitchcock Presents (1959) (Season 4 Episode 20; "The Diamond Necklace") - George Maynard
- Alfred Hitchcock Presents (1959) (Season 4 Episode 36; "Invitation to an Accident") - Albert Martin
- A Private's Affair (1959) - Major R.C. Hanley
- Career (1959) - Matt Helmsley
- The Absent Minded Professor (1961) - General Hotchkiss
- Leave It to Beaver (1961) (Season 4 Episode 28; "Mistaken Identity") - Lieutenant Barnes
- Bachelor in Paradise (1961) - Attorney Backett
- Follow That Dream (1962) - H. Arthur King
- That Touch of Mink (1962) - Doctor Gruber
- Days of Wine and Roses (1962) - Rad Leland
- Son of Flubber (1963) - Prosecutor
- The Misadventures of Merlin Jones (1964) - Professor Shattuck
- How to Murder Your Wife (1965) - District Attorney
- The Monkey's Uncle (1965) - Professor Shattuck
- The Horse in the Gray Flannel Suit (1968) - Harry Tomis
- The Brotherhood (1968) - Sol Levin
- Sweet Charity (1969) - Nicholsby
- The Computer Wore Tennis Shoes (1969) - Dean Edgar Collingsgood
- R. P. M. (1970) - Hewlett
- The Barefoot Executive (1971) - Farnsworth
- Now You See Him, Now You Don't (1972) - Dean Edgar Collingsgood
- The Seniors (1978) - The Inspector (final film role)
