= Albert Aley =

American producer, screenwriter, script editor/doctor and story editor

- Born: April 25, 1919; New York, U.S.
- Died: January 1, 1986 (aged 66); Seattle, Washington, U.S.
- Occupation(s): Producer, screenwriter, script doctor, story editor
- Spouse: Elaine Firestone
- Children: 2

Albert Aley (April 25, 1919 – January 1, 1986) was an American producer, screenwriter, script doctor and story editor.

== Career ==
Aley began his career, as an actor on the radio series Let's Pretend. Later in his career, Aley worked on radio and wrote for two episodes for the television series Treasury Men in Action. He later was a producer, screenwriter and script editor for Tom Corbett, Space Cadet. His other credits includes, Ironside, The Paper Chase, Hawaii Five-O, Quincy, M.E., Have Gun – Will Travel, and Rawhide. In 1966 he wrote the script for, The Ugly Dachshund, a film that was produced by Walt Disney Productions. In 1971, Aley was nominated for an Primetime Emmy Award for Outstanding Series - Drama. He retired in 1981.

== Death ==
Aley died in January 1986 at the Seattle Hospital in Seattle, Washington, at the age of 66. He was married to Elaine Firestone and had two daughters, Christopher Cox and Suzanne Wagner.
