= Make Mine Laughs =

1949 film by Richard Fleischer

- Theatrical release poster
- Directed by: Richard Fleischer
- Screenplay by: Hal Yates
- Produced by: George Bilson
- Starring: Ray Bolger; Anne Shirley; Dennis Day; Joan Davis; Jack Haley; Leon Errol; Frances Langford; Frankie Carle; Robert Lamouret; Manuel Viera; Marita Viera; Rosario; Antonio; Freddie Fisher; The Titans; Myrna Dell; Dorothy Granger; Gil Lamb
- Cinematography: Jack MacKenzie; Robert De Grasse; Frank Redman
- Edited by: Robert Swink; Edward W. Williams
- Music by: Roy Webb
- Distributed by: RKO Radio
- Release date: August 11, 1949 (US)
- Running time: 63 minutes
- Country: United States
- Language: English

Make Mine Laughs is a 1949 American musical comedy film directed by Richard Fleischer. The film was a compilation of comic scenes and musical numbers from RKO Radio Pictures' feature films and short subjects of the mid-1940s. It was the second of RKO's four "musical revue" features, composed largely of musical and comedy highlights from previous RKO productions. Comedian Gil Lamb hosts the proceedings, finding time to make satirical comments about the opening credits and to perform his "swallowing the harmonica" specialty.

The film clips include two short subjects, Leon Errol's Beware of Redheads and two clips from RKO's Flicker Flashbacks entries (a 1920 fashion show narrated by radio's Ward Wilson and a dramatic playlet narrated by Knox Manning). Other clips from the vaults are Frances Langford singing "Moonlight Over the Islands" (from The Bamboo Blonde), Anne Shirley and Dennis Day duetting on "If You Happen to Find a Heart" (from Music in Manhattan), comedy bandleader Freddie Fisher (from Seven Days Ashore), dance team Rosario & Antonio (from Pan-Americana), and pianist-bandleader Frankie Carle from an RKO short subject. New specialties filmed especially for Make Mine Laughs are performed by puppeteer Robert Lamouret and his duck figure Dudule, Manuel & Marita Viera and their trained-monkeys act, and acrobatic trio The Titans (with Gil Lamb worked into their act).

Ray Bolger and Jack Haley brought suit against RKO for unauthorized use of their performances (Bolger's boxing pantomime from Four Jacks and a Jill and Haley's "Who Killed Vaudeville?" number from George White's Scandals). By the time the suit was settled in 1951, both Bolger and Haley had been paid off, and RKO withdrew the picture from distribution. The studio avoided any future lawsuits by confining its remaining variety-show features Footlight Varieties and Merry Mirthquakes to new numbers staged especially for the films, and comedy sequences from RKO's backlog of short subjects.
