= Rainbow Island (1944 film) =

1944 film by Ralph Murphy

- Theatrical release poster
- Directed by: Ralph Murphy
- Screenplay by: Arthur Phillips; Walter DeLeon
- Story by: Seena Owen
- Produced by: E.D. Leshin
- Starring: Dorothy Lamour; Eddie Bracken; Gil Lamb; Barry Sullivan; Forrest Orr; Anne Revere; Reed Hadley
- Cinematography: Karl Struss
- Edited by: Arthur P. Schmidt
- Music by: Score: Roy Webb; Songs: Burton Lane (music); Ted Koehler (lyrics)
- Production company: Paramount Pictures
- Distributed by: Paramount Pictures
- Release date: September 5, 1944
- Running time: 98 minutes
- Country: United States
- Language: English

Rainbow Island is a 1944 American musical comedy film directed by Ralph Murphy and written by Arthur Phillips and Walter DeLeon. The film stars Dorothy Lamour, Eddie Bracken, Gil Lamb, Barry Sullivan, Forrest Orr, Anne Revere and Reed Hadley. The film was released on September 5, 1944, by Paramount Pictures.

== Cast ==
- Dorothy Lamour as Lona
- Eddie Bracken as Toby Smith
- Gil Lamb as Pete Jenkins
- Barry Sullivan as Ken Masters
- Forrest Orr as Dr. Curtis
- Anne Revere as Queen Okalana
- Reed Hadley as High Priest Kahuna
- Marc Lawrence as Alcoa
- Adia Kuznetzoff as Executioner
- Olga San Juan as Miki
- Elena Verdugo as Moana

== Production ==
Dorothy Lamour was reluctant to play the lead. Paramount was going to use contract player Yvonne De Carlo instead but then Lamour changed her mind, and De Carlo was relegated to a bit player. "You might have seen Gil Lamb chasing me through the bushes in it", said De Carlo later.
