= The Gnome-Mobile =

1967 film by Robert Stevenson

- Original window card, 1967
- Directed by: Robert Stevenson
- Written by: Ellis Kadison
- Based on: The Gnomobile by Upton Sinclair
- Produced by: James Algar; Walt Disney
- Starring: Walter Brennan; Tom Lowell; Matthew Garber; Karen Dotrice; Ed Wynn; Richard Deacon; Sean McClory
- Cinematography: Edward Colman
- Edited by: Norman R. Palmer
- Music by: Buddy Baker
- Production company: Walt Disney Productions
- Distributed by: Buena Vista Distribution
- Release date: July 12, 1967
- Running time: 85 minutes
- Country: United States
- Language: English
- Box office: $4,000,000 (US/ Canada)

The Gnome-Mobile is a 1967 American musical fantasy comedy film directed by Robert Stevenson and produced by Walt Disney Productions. Based on the 1936 book The Gnomobile by Upton Sinclair, it was one of the last films supervised by Walt Disney. Walter Brennan is dual cast as D.J. Mulrooney, the kind-hearted lumber tycoon of Irish descent, and as the irascible 943-year-old gnome Knobby. The film crosses genres "between a comedy, a romance, a drama, and an environmental critique". Karen Dotrice and Matthew Garber, previously the Banks children in Mary Poppins (1964), portray Mulrooney's grandchildren Elizabeth and Rodney. Tom Lowell, as the gnome Jasper, Richard Deacon, and Sean McClory round out the cast.

Richard and Robert Sherman contributed the title song. The film marked the final roles for both Matthew Garber and Ed Wynn. The Gnome-Mobile was re-released theatrically on November 5, 1976.

== Plot ==
D.J. Mulrooney, an executive officer of a timber-trading company, travels in his customized 1930 Rolls-Royce Phantom II to Seattle to sell 50,000 acres of timberland. The car was purchased after D.J. earned his first million dollars. His first stop is the airport, where he picks up his grandchildren, 10-year-old Elizabeth and 8-year-old Rodney, who are to accompany D.J. on his trip to Seattle.

Traveling north from San Francisco, the trio detour through what later became Redwood National Park where D.J. has endowed a grove of Redwood trees, entitled "Mulrooney Grove". There they encounter a gnome called Jasper and his 943-year-old grandfather Knobby who, like D.J., is passionate and short-tempered. Knobby is suffering from a sickness called "fading", or becoming semi-transparent. The reason for this "fading" is that Knobby fears that he and Jasper are the last two of their Gnome kind, and Knobby wants Jasper to find a bride before Knobby dies. Despite Knobby's immense hatred for humans like D.J. whose logging caused damage to the forests and the livelihood of gnomes, the gnomes agree to go along with the trio and seek other gnomes. The children rename the Rolls-Royce "the Gnome-Mobile".

Jasper and his grandfather are kidnapped by Horatio Quaxton, a freak show owner, while D.J. is committed to an asylum by his security guard Ralph Yarby, who has overheard D.J. talking about gnomes and deems his boss insane. Rodney and Elizabeth rescue D.J. from the asylum, rescue Jasper from Quaxton, and then set out to find Knobby, who had managed to escape earlier.

They arrive in the woods to find a thriving community of gnomes. Jasper is introduced by Rufus the Gnome King as "the eligible gnome" to a large number of young females of his race, who compete in a contest to determine which one will marry him. He is smitten with one timid, lovely girl gnome named Violet, who is hated by all of the other girl gnomes. Jasper tries to get Violet to catch him, but she keeps getting pushed to the side and run over by the other very aggressive girl gnomes. After a very wild chase, Violet manages to win the race and she and Jasper get married. D.J. gives as a wedding present the rights to the 50,000 acres of forest that were to be sold for logging, which become a haven for the gnomes.

== Cast ==
- Walter Brennan as:
  - D.J. Mulrooney
  - Knobby
- Matthew Garber as Rodney Winthrop, the grandson of D.J. Mulrooney
- Karen Dotrice as Elizabeth Winthrop, the granddaughter of D.J. Mulrooney
- Richard Deacon as Ralph Yarby
- Tom Lowell as Jasper
- Sean McClory as Horatio Quaxton
- Ed Wynn as Rufus the Gnome King
- Jerome Cowan as Dr. Ramsey
- Charles Lane as Dr. Scoggins
- Norman Grabowski as Male Nurse
- Gil Lamb as Gas Attendant
- Maudie Prickett as Katie Barrett
- Cami Sebring as Violet
- Various animal voices as various uncredited actors

== Reception ==
Roger Ebert of the Chicago Sun-Times gave the film three stars out of four, calling the special effects "fascinating" and reporting that the kids in the audience "got their money's worth". Howard Thompson of The New York Times described it as "a good-natured but heavy-handed little comedy", finding that "the action and light-hearted spirit sag under a crisscross jumble of slapstick and broadly handled locomotion that flattens the fun". Arthur D. Murphy of Variety described the film as "amusing, if somewhat uneven". Charles Champlin of the Los Angeles Times wrote: "The moppet audience for which 'The Gnome-Mobile' is intended will obviously find it a delight, funny and ingenious. The full-sized among us will find a few laughs, too, but cannot rank the film with Disney's best by a long shot, or a gnome shot". The Monthly Film Bulletin called it "a whimsical fantasy in the Disney tradition of clean, honest fun, with a merrily tuneful title song, moderately ingenious trick work, and some unsophisticated comedy of which the highlight is a car chase in which the aristocratic old Rolls is pursued by a modern vehicle which bit by bit falls to pieces".

Film critic Leonard Maltin rates this as one of Disney's best comedy-fantasy films, and states that it is a "mystery" why the film is not better known. He says it deserves to be rediscovered and enjoyed by a new generation, especially younger children.
