= Blackbeard's Ghost =

1968 film by Robert Stevenson

- Theatrical release poster
- Directed by: Robert Stevenson
- Screenplay by: Don DaGradi; Bill Walsh
- Based on: Blackbeard's Ghost by Ben Stahl
- Produced by: Bill Walsh
- Starring: Peter Ustinov; Dean Jones; Suzanne Pleshette
- Cinematography: Edward Colman
- Edited by: Robert Stafford
- Music by: Robert F. Brunner
- Production company: Walt Disney Productions
- Distributed by: Buena Vista Distribution
- Release date: February 8, 1968
- Running time: 107 minutes
- Country: United States
- Language: English
- Box office: $21,540,050

Blackbeard's Ghost is a 1968 American fantasy comedy film directed by Robert Stevenson and starring Peter Ustinov, Dean Jones, and Suzanne Pleshette. It was produced by Walt Disney Productions and Bill Walsh. It is based upon the 1965 novel of the same name by Ben Stahl and was shot at the Walt Disney Studios.

== Plot ==
Steve Walker arrives in the fictional East Coast (Note: The film places the setting on "the coast of the Americas" (in the prologue text). The novelization of the film (not the original book) has two passages that place Godolphin in the Carolinas. Disney's marketing material for home media releases describes the film as taking place in New England.) town of Godolphin, to take the position of track coach at Godolphin College. The night of his arrival coincides with a charity bazaar at Blackbeard's Inn, the hotel where he will be boarding, named after the notorious English pirate Captain Edward Teach and now run by the Daughters of the Buccaneers, elderly descendants of the pirate's crew. The inn had been built from timbers of ships that had run aground in the bay. The owners are attempting to pay off their mortgage to keep the inn from being bought by the local crime boss, Silky Seymour, who wants to build a casino on the land. Steve quickly discovers his track team's shortcomings and runs afoul of the dean of Godolphin College, its football coach, and Seymour. He also makes the acquaintance of Godolphin professor Jo Anne Baker, who is anxious to help the elderly ladies save Blackbeard's Inn.

After a bidding war with the football coach at the charity auction, Steve wins an antique bed warmer once owned by Blackbeard's 10th wife, Aldetha Teach, who had a reputation of being a witch. Inside the hollow wooden handle of this bed warmer is hidden a book of magic spells that had once been the property of Aldetha. Steve recites, on a lark, a spell "to bring to your eyes and ears one who is bound in Limbo", unintentionally conjuring up the ghost of Blackbeard, who appears as a socially-inappropriate drunkard, cursed by his wife to an existence in limbo unless he can perform a good deed.

Steve and Blackbeard are bound to one another by the power of the spell, and only the very reluctant Steve can see or hear the ghost. As a result, Steve must deal with the antics of the wayward pirate while attempting to revive Godolphin's track team and form a relationship with Jo Anne. Steve is falsely arrested for drunk driving when Blackbeard attempts to drive Steve's automobile, steering it like a pirate ship. Because the arresting officer cannot see Blackbeard, and because Blackbeard crashed the cop's motorcycle into a tree, Steve spends a night in jail. While in jail, Steve reminds Blackbeard that if he does a good deed, his curse will be broken. Steve asks Blackbeard for his treasure to help the Daughters of the Buccaneers save the inn, but Blackbeard admits that he spent all of the money. Steve decides not to trust Blackbeard.

Steve is released from jail the next morning due to lack of evidence but is put on probation with the college, forced to win the big track meet or be fired from his position. The problem is that Steve's team is sorrowfully weak and ordinarily do not stand a chance at winning. Blackbeard is firmly told by Steve, more than once, not to interfere with the boys on his team or the opposing team either. Blackbeard creates further complications by stealing one of the Inn's mortgage payments and betting it on Steve's track team. Blackbeard's intention is to use his ghostly powers to help Godolphin win the track meet, and then use the winnings to pay the mortgage in full. Steve is at first outraged by the pirate's interference, but he decides the greater good is to win the money for the sake of the Inn. He also accepts the pirate's help in shaking down Silky Seymour and his thugs after Seymour refuses to pay out the winnings from the bet.

With the mortgage paid, Blackbeard has performed his good deed and is released from the curse. After Steve asks the ladies and Jo Anne to recite the spell, thereby rendering Blackbeard visible to them, Blackbeard bids them all a cordial goodbye and departs to join his former crew, leaving Steve and Jo Anne to pursue their future together.

== Cast ==
- Peter Ustinov as Captain Blackbeard
- Dean Jones as Steve Walker
- Suzanne Pleshette as Jo Anne Baker
- Elsa Lanchester as Emily Stowecroft
- Joby Baker as Silky Seymour
- Elliott Reid as TV commentator
- Richard Deacon as Dean Roland Wheaton
- Norm Grabowski as Virgil
- Kelly Thordsen as Motorcycle Cop
- Michael Conrad as Pinetop Purvis
- Herbie Faye as Croupier
- George Murdock as Head official
- Hank Jones as Gudger Larkin
- Ned Glass as Teller
- Gil Lamb as Waiter
- Alan Carney as Bartender
- Ted Markland as Charles
- Lou Nova as Leon
- Charlie Brill as Edward
- Herb Vigran as Danny Oly
- William Fawcett as Mr. Ainsworth, Bank Official
- Betty Bronson as Old Lady
- Elsie Baker as Old Lady
- Kathryn Minner as Old Lady
- Sara Taft as Old Lady

== Reception ==
Roger Ebert of the Chicago Sun-Times gave the film three stars out of four and called it "Disney's best since The Absent-Minded Professor" and "a splendid vehicle for the many talents of Peter Ustinov". Howard Thompson of The New York Times wrote: "The Walt Disney people have delivered a delightful seasonal goody for the young and young-hearted, called Blackbeard's Ghost. After a couple of limp herrings, the master's live-action unit is back on sure footing with the neat, perky and flavorsome little comedy-fantasy that arrived yesterday at neighborhood theaters." Variety declared: "The inspired direction makes it all come alive via firstrate special effects and sight gags, and through a fanciful script that, in a most adroit way, is neither too literate nor too sketchy. Ustinov plays his part to the hilt: mugging and cutting up, as the wandering spirit who must do a good deed to achieve repose." Charles Champlin of the Los Angeles Times praised the film as "a warm and wacky diversion which could not really have been assembled much better". Monthly Film Bulletin wrote, "Peter Ustinov's exuberant professionalism just about rescues what would otherwise have been a disaster. The basic idea contains a pleasant germ of fantasy, but this is dissipated by a ponderous and self-indulgent script which seems determined to make a mountain out of a molehill. Robert Stevenson's direction is equally pedestrian, and the rather silly fantasy of the crazy sports sequence is a feeble echo of a similar scene in the Marx Brothers' Horse Feathers."

Blackbeard's Ghost has a Rotten Tomatoes approval rating of 82% based on 11 reviews.

== Release ==
The film earned $5 million in theatrical rentals in North America.

== Comic book adaptation ==
- Gold Key Comics: Blackbeard's Ghost (June 1968)

== See also ==
- List of American films of 1968
- List of ghost films
- Chamatkar, a 1992 Bollywood film inspired by Blackbeard's Ghost.
- Pirates of the Caribbean: On Stranger Tides, another Disney film, released in 2011, also featuring Blackbeard.
