= The Ugly Dachshund =

1966 film by Norman Tokar

- Theatrical release poster
- Directed by: Norman Tokar
- Screenplay by: Albert Aley
- Based on: The Ugly Dachshund by Gladys Bronwyn Stern
- Produced by: Walt Disney; Winston Hibler
- Starring: Dean Jones; Suzanne Pleshette; Charlie Ruggles
- Cinematography: Edward Colman
- Edited by: Robert Stafford
- Music by: George Bruns
- Production company: Walt Disney Productions
- Distributed by: Buena Vista Distribution
- Release dates: February 4, 1966 (premiere); February 16, 1966 (United States)
- Running time: 93 minutes
- Country: United States
- Language: English
- Box office: $6.2 million (est. US/ Canada rentals)

The Ugly Dachshund is a 1966 American comedy film directed by Norman Tokar, written by Albert Aley, and starring Dean Jones and Suzanne Pleshette in a story about a Great Dane who believes he is a dachshund. Produced by Walt Disney Productions, the film was based on a 1938 novel by Gladys Bronwyn Stern. It was one of several light-hearted comedies produced by the Disney Studios during the 1960s. The animated featurette Winnie the Pooh and the Honey Tree, directed by Wolfgang Reitherman, was attached to the film in theatrical showings.

== Plot ==
Fran Garrison and her husband Mark are a young, happily married couple and the proud owners of an award-winning dachshund named Danke. The movie begins with them frantically getting into the car and heading to the hospital as Danke is expecting a litter of pups. In a hurry to the hospital, Officer Carmody tries to pull them over for going 50 mph in a 25 mph zone. After notifying him that they are on the way to the hospital and indicating that Fran is in labor, Officer Carmody pulls in front of them, turns on the sirens, and escorts them to the county hospital.

After he arrives and finds that Mr. and Mrs. Garrison have gone past him, he gets back on his motorcycle and follows them to the vet. It is then revealed that Danke is the one in labor. While Mark is outside waiting for Fran, Officer Carmody catches up to him. After Mark thanks him for helping them get to the vet on time, Officer Carmody reveals that he was under the impression that Mrs. Garrison was the one in labor and proceeds to write multiple traffic violation tickets, totalling $110. When Mr. Garrison arrives at the vet to pick up Danke and her three female puppies, (Wilhelmina, Heidi, and Chloe), veterinarian Dr. Pruitt mentions that his female Great Dane, Duchess, has also given birth, but pushed away one of her male puppies because she did not have enough milk for him. Doc Pruitt convinces Mark to bring the Great Dane puppy home because Danke had too much milk, and she could save his life. When he arrives home and Fran notices that there is another puppy, she is surprised but does not suspect that the puppy is from another litter and reminds Mark that he should thank Danke for giving him a boy like he always wanted. He eventually tells Fran the truth about the male puppy and names him Brutus.

As Brutus grows up with Fran's dachshund puppies, he believes he is one of them and picks up mannerisms, such as hunching close to the ground to walk. The dachshunds are mischievous creatures and lead Brutus through a series of comic misadventures, such as the dachshunds tearing up Danke's sweater, Mark's studio being splattered with paint, Brutus breaking Fran's bed, Officer Carmody (now Sergeant Carmody) being chased up a tree after Brutus mistakes him for a burglar, and a garden party being turned topsy-turvy after the caterers mistake Brutus for a lion. These events and her refusal to believe her dachshunds are behind the mischief result in Fran wanting Mark to remove Brutus from the house, but when he saves her favorite puppy, Chloe, from a garbage truck, she changes her mind.

Mark and Fran later enter their dogs in a dog show with Brutus meeting others of his breed. He notices a female Harlequin Great Dane and stands at attention, soon going on to win two blue ribbons. Brutus finally finds out what it is like to be a Great Dane, making the dachshunds respect him while Mark and Fran decide to end competing in dog shows and embark on a much happier relationship.

== Cast ==
- Dean Jones as Mark Garrison
- Suzanne Pleshette as Fran Garrison
- Charlie Ruggles as Doctor Pruitt
- Kelly Thordsen as Officer Carmody
- Parley Baer as Mel Chadwick
- Robert Kino as Mr. Toyama
- Mako as Kenji
- Charles Lane as the Judge
- Gil Lamb as the Milkman
- Dick Wessel as Eddie the Garbageman (voice dubbed by Paul Frees)

== Reception ==
Howard Thompson of The New York Times called it "a thin, contrived, one-joke comedy". Variety stated that the film's "sum total adds up to firstrate family entertainment, not to mention as having definite appeal for dog lovers and audiences generally." Margaret Harford of the Los Angeles Times wrote: "The fun runs thin early in The Ugly Dachshund, a new color film from our usually reliable friend, Walt Disney. Yet even with the old magic diluted, this latest picture from Buena Vista has some worthwhile moments for Disney fans and dog lovers." The Monthly Film Bulletin commented: "The story is a featherweight affair in which the invention frequently runs thin and seeks sanctuary in slapstick... Apart from some uncommonly pretty colour photography, it is undoubtedly the dogs who take the honours."

== See also ==
- List of American films of 1966
