= Norm Grabowski =

American hot rod builder and actor (1933–2012)

- Grabowski in Herbie Rides Again, 1974
- Born: February 5, 1933; Essex County, New Jersey, U.S.
- Died: October 12, 2012 (aged 79); Cassville, Missouri, U.S.
- Occupations: Hot rod builder, actor

Norman "Norm" Grabowski (February 5, 1933 – October 12, 2012) was an American hot rod builder and actor. The heavy-set crew cut-wearing Grabowski appeared in minor roles in many films produced by Albert Zugsmith and Walt Disney.

== Biography ==
Grabowski was born in Essex County, New Jersey (either Irvington or Maplewood, sources vary), the youngest of three siblings born to Polish immigrant parents.

In 1952, after leaving the US Army on a medical discharge, He built a hot rod based on a shortened 1922 Ford Model T touring car mated to a similarly extremely shortened Model A pickup truck bed. With a powerful Cadillac overhead valve engine that came from his parents' sedan, the vehicle that resulted had a unique appearance and stance, which inspired many hot rods created afterward. The car was first featured on the cover of the October, 1955 issue of Hot Rod and then underwent further modifications, including a greater rake, tilted windshield and blue paint with flames when it famously appeared in color on the cover of the April, 1957 issue of Car Craft magazine, as well as in the April 29, 1957, issue of LIFE.

Grabowski's hugely influential T-bucket hot rod, which became known as the Kookie Kar, was used in the television show 77 Sunset Strip. The car was owned and driven in the show by the character Kookie, who was played by Edd Byrnes.

As a consequence of the magazine exposure, Grabowski was approached about renting the car out to appear in movies and television shows. The contacts he made in this way led to an acting career for Grabowski. He appeared in television shows, including The Monkees, Batman (episodes 39 and 40 in 1966), The Many Loves of Dobie Gillis, and The New Phil Silvers Show, and films such as High School Confidential (1958), The Beat Generation (1959), The Big Operator (1959), Girls Town (1959), College Confidential (1960), Sex Kittens Go to College (1960), "My Three Sons" (1961), The Misadventures of Merlin Jones (1964), Roustabout (1964), Girl Happy (1965), The Monkey's Uncle (1965), Out of Sight (1966), Blackbeard's Ghost (1968), The Towering Inferno (1974), Hooper (1978) and The Cannonball Run (1981).

Grabowski was known as a wood carver, and many hot rods and custom cars feature his unique hand-carved skull gearshift knobs. He retired from acting in the 1980s after The Cannonball Run.

Grabowski died on October 12, 2012, at the age of 79.

== Partial filmography ==
- Darby's Rangers (1958) — Squad Member (uncredited)
- The Young Lions (1958) — Barracks Inspection Private (uncredited)
- High School Confidential (1958) — Flat Top (uncredited)
- The Naked and the Dead (1958) — Shipboard Soldier (uncredited)
- The Perfect Furlough (1958) — Soldier in Hospital (uncredited)
- Torpedo Run (1958) — Sub Crewman (uncredited)
- Night of the Quarter Moon (1959) — Tough Punk (uncredited)
- The Beat Generation (1959) — The Beat Beatnik
- The Big Operator (1959) — Lou Green
- Girls Town (1959) — Skin
- College Confidential (1960) — Skippy
- Sex Kittens Go to College (1960) — Woo Woo Grabowski
- The Honeymoon Machine (1961) — Max's Operator (uncredited)
- The Chapman Report (1962) — Beach Football Player (uncredited)
- Son of Flubber (1963) — Rutland Football Player #33 (uncredited)
- The Wheeler Dealers (1963) — Delivery Boy (uncredited)
- The Misadventures of Merlin Jones (1964) — Norman, Midvale Football Player
- Roustabout (1964) — Sam
- Girl Happy (1965) — 'Wolf Call' O'Brien (uncredited)
- The Monkey's Uncle (1965) — Norman
- Sergeant Deadhead (1965) — Air Policeman
- Out of Sight (1966) — Huh!
- Texas Across the River (1966) — Cavalryman (uncredited)
- The Gnome-Mobile (1967) — Male Nurse
- The Happiest Millionaire (1967) — Joe Turner (uncredited)
- Blackbeard's Ghost (1968) — Virgil
- The Horse in the Gray Flannel Suit (1968) — Truck Driver
- Zabriskie Point (1970) — Man in Deli (uncredited)
- Another Nice Mess (1972) — Agent Jablonski
- The Naked Ape (1973) — Sargent
- Herbie Rides Again (1974) — Security Guard #2
- Win, Place or Steal (1974) — Officer Sprivten
- The Towering Inferno (1974) — Flaker
- W.W. and the Dixie Dancekings (1975) — Redneck (uncredited)
- Hooper (1978) — Hammerhead
- The Cannonball Run (1981) — Petoski (final film role)

== Television ==
Year	Title	Role	Notes
1965	The Munsters	Winthrop	S1:E24, "Love Locked Out"
1966	The Beverly Hillbillies	Bernie	S4:E19, “The Cat Burglar”
1967	The Monkees	Butch	S2:E10, "The Wild Monkees"
1971	The Smith Family	Robber	S2:E3, "Stakeout"
