= Kelly Thordsen =

American film and television actor (1917–1978)

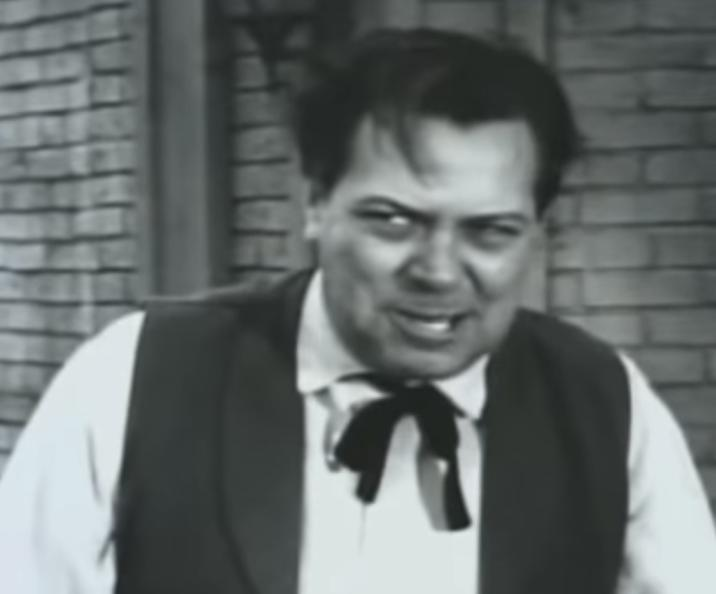
- Thordsen in Frontier Doctor, 1959
- Born: Sherman Jess Thordsen; January 19, 1917; Deadwood, South Dakota, U.S.
- Died: January 23, 1978 (aged 61); Sun Valley, Los Angeles, U.S.
- Occupations: Film and television actor
- Years active: 1956–1978
- Spouse: Lucille Baumgartner (m. 1935, divorced)
- Children: 4

Sherman Jess Thordsen (January 19, 1917 – January 23, 1978) was an American film and television actor.

== Life and career ==
Thordsen was born in Deadwood, South Dakota. He served in the United States Navy during World War II and the Korean War, and worked as a police officer at the Los Angeles Police Department for twelve years. Thordsen began his screen career in 1956 in the film The Desperados Are in Town. He then played an uncredited role in the 1957 film The True Story of Jesse James. In the same year, Thordsen played the part of Sgt. Bruce in the film Invasion of the Saucer Men.

Thordsen guest-starred in numerous television programs including Gunsmoke (S2E38 - “The Man Who Would Be Marshall in 1957 & S11E2 - “The Storm” in 1965), Bonanza (S5E30 "Enter Thomas Bowers" in 1964), (S6E21 "The Search" in 1965), Wagon Train, The Life and Legend of Wyatt Earp, The Deputy, Tales of Wells Fargo, Cheyenne, The Andy Griffith Show, Rawhide, Perry Mason, The Time Tunnel, The Fugitive, The Rockford Files, The Rifleman and Cimarron Strip. He played the recurring role of "Colorado Charlie" for five episodes of the action and adventure television series Yancy Derringer.

Thordsen played Detective Sgt. Hank Johnson in the 1959 film City of Fear, and a sheriff in the 1962 film Sweet Bird of Youth. Thordsen also had an uncredited role as a burly man in To Kill a Mockingbird. Other film appearances included The Misadventures of Merlin Jones (1964), The Ugly Dachshund (1966), Good Times (1967), Blackbeard's Ghost (1968), and The Strange Monster of Strawberry Cove (1971).

In 1972 he appeared in two episodes of the television sitcom Sanford and Son. He played Sheriff L. D. Wicker in the 1974 film The Parallax View.

== Death ==
Thordsen died in January 1978 of cancer at his home in Sun Valley, Los Angeles, at the age of 61. He was buried in Forest Lawn Memorial Park.
