= Alfred Lewis Levitt =

American screenwriter

- Born: Alfred Lewis Levitt; June 3, 1916; Bronx, New York, U.S.
- Died: November 16, 2002 (aged 86); Los Angeles, California, U.S.
- Occupation: screenwriter
- Spouse: Helen Slote Levitt (1938–1993)

Alfred Lewis Levitt (June 3, 1916 – November 16, 2002) was an American film and television screenwriter. He attended New York University, and served in a camera unit of the United States Air Force during the Second World War. Following the war, Levitt was the screenwriter for such films as The Boy with Green Hair (1948), Mrs. Mike (1950), and The Barefoot Mailman (1951).

In 1951 he was called before the House Un-American Activities Committee (HUAC) for his communist involvements, and was entered on the Hollywood blacklist. Following a screenwriting credit for Dream Wife (1953), he was unemployed as a screenwriter for about five years.

Levitt and Pearl Helen Slote (December 6, 1916 - April 3, 1993) were married in 1938; they had two children. Helen Slote Levitt, as Slote was called after her marriage, was also blacklisted in 1951. After more than five years, the Levitts were employed again as screenwriters. They were credited as "Tom and Helen August". Their credits included many episodes of television shows such as Bewitched and The Bionic Woman and also the feature films The Misadventures of Merlin Jones (1964) and The Monkey's Uncle (1965). In 1971 they were nominated for a Writers Guild Award for an episode of the television program, All in the Family. Their last credit was for a 1979 episode of the program Diff'rent Strokes.

The Levitts' experiences as blacklisted screenwriters have been described in several books about the Hollywood blacklist. Among the Levitts' activities during the early years of their blacklisting, and corresponding unemployment, was to participate in publishing the journal Hollywood Review. Hollywood Review has been characterized by Ceplair and Englund as, "...a critical review focusing on American films --more specifically on the increasing violence, sadism, hatred, bigotry, and glorification of brutality perpetrated on audiences by the entertainment industry." Nine issues of the journal were published between 1953 and 1956.

In 1978, Levitt rejoined the Writers Guild of America. Starting in 1988, Levitt led an effort through the Writers' Guild to correct film credits from the blacklist era, in which it became common for the work of blacklisted writers to be uncredited, or credited using pseudonyms. The Writers' Guild maintains a listing of 24 films with revised writing credits on its website.

In 1995, Alfred and Helen Levitt were honored with the Morgan Cox Award of the Writers Guild of America.
