= Edward Colman (cinematographer) =

American cinematographer (1905–1995)

- Born: January 25, 1905; Philadelphia, Pennsylvania
- Died: January 24, 1995 (aged 89); Newport Beach, California
- Occupation: Cinematographer
- Years active: 1930–1971
- Spouse: Phyllis Colman

Edward Colman (January 25, 1905 – January 24, 1995) was an American cinematographer. He had a prolific relationship with Walt Disney Studios; beginning his relationship with that studio in 1953 as cinematographer for the television series Dragnet. He was nominated for an Emmy Award in 1956 for his work on that program. He also directed many live action films for Disney; notably earning Academy Award nominations for his cinematography for the films The Absent-Minded Professor (1961) and Mary Poppins (1964).

== Career ==
He was born in Philadelphia on January 25, 1905. He started working in the film business in the early 1930s. He was one of the - unnamed - cameramen, the magnificent aerial views of the Howard Hughes produced war film Hell's Angels. During this time he concentrated on the convincing design and photography of special effects. He completed his training primarily in Great Britain where he worked on during this time in the science fiction classics Things to Come and The Man Who Could Work Miracles, both of which were made in 1936 with a large star line-up based on models by H.G. Wells. During filming, he also met Peter Ellenshaw, with whom he would later work with in Hollywood.

At the end of the 1930s Colman returned to the US and worked as a camera operator on films such as Tower of London in 1939. After performing military service in World War II, he continued to work with films Frontier Gal (1945), Walk a Crooked Mile (1948), and Joan of Arc (1948). In 1951 he became a member of the Academy of Motion Picture Arts and Sciences. In 1953 he was a featured speaker and panelist at the American Society of Cinematographers's symposium.

In the following years Colman transitioned into television. Beginning in late 1953, he photographed 22 episodes of the successful television series Dragnet which was his first job at Disney Studios. In 1956 he was nominated for the Emmy Award for Best Cinematography for his work on that program.

Disney also utilized Colman's talents in motion pictures; beginning with the lavish live action film 20,000 Leagues Under the Sea (1954) under the direction of Richard Fleischer. Colman was employed as the head cameraman of the second unit team, which was a challenge, for example, with the complicated underwater shots. After Colman had worked as a shooter on five episodes of The Mickey Mouse Club television series in 1955, Walt Disney finally offered him the photographic direction of The Shaggy Dog in 1959 with Fred MacMurray. Colman benefited from the knowledge he had acquired in Great Britain before the war in the implementation of the numerous special effects for which the film that was shot in black and white.

After the huge box office success this produced only a modest budget strip and the even more successful The Absent-Minded Professor (1961), also with Fred MacMurray and many film tricks to Colman has established itself at Disney as one of the most important cameramen. He was helped by the fact that he had received an Oscar nomination for his original black and white photography. In the years that followed, Colman was involved in almost all of the studio's major real film projects and directed the shoots for numerous Disney hit films. He mainly worked with the directors Norman Tokar and Robert Stevenson. With the latter, he also made his most famous film, the musical Mary Poppins. The film version of P.L. Travers' Stories, starring Julie Andrews in the title role, earned Colman another Academy Award nomination in 1965.

Not only did he specialize in captivating intricate special effects, but he also had a talent for landscape photography, as evidenced by the atmospheric shots from Vermont for Those Calloways, a story about a family of conservationists in New England. He combined both in 1967 in The Gnome-Mobile, in which the “forced perspective” was used to make the interplay between humans and dwarfs believable. These for the Disney film Darby O'Gill and the Little People makes use of the fact that, due to the two-dimensionality of the film image, the human eye cannot see how far things or people are really apart as long as the camera or the objects being filmed are do not move towards each other. After his work on The Love Bug, Colman retired.

He appeared in cameo in the Disneyland episode "Back Stage Party" (1961) and at the end of the filming of Babes in Toyland, he can be seen once in the picture.

Colman was a member of the American Society of Cinematographers (ASC). His brother Ben Colman (1907–1988) was also a cameraman.

Edward Colman died on January 24, 1995, in Newport Beach, the day before his 90th birthday.

== Oscar nominations ==
Both nominations were in Best Cinematography

- 34th Academy Awards-Nominated in B/W cinematography for The Absent-Minded Professor. Lost to The Hustler.
- 37th Academy Awards-Nominated in color cinematography for Mary Poppins. Lost to My Fair Lady.

== Selected filmography ==
- The D.I. (1957)
- Black Patch (1957)
- -30- (1959)
- Donald in Mathmagic Land (1959)
- The Shaggy Dog (1959)
- The Absent-Minded Professor (1961)
- Babes in Toyland (1961)
- Big Red (1962)
- Savage Sam (1963)
- Son of Flubber (1963)
- Mary Poppins (1964)
- The Misadventures of Merlin Jones (1964)
- Those Calloways (1964)
- The Monkey's Uncle (1965)
- That Darn Cat! (1965)
- The Ugly Dachshund (1966)
- The Adventures of Bullwhip Griffin (1967)
- The Ambushers (1967)
- The Gnome-Mobile (1967)
- The Happiest Millionaire (1967)
- Blackbeard's Ghost (1968)
- The Love Bug (1968)
- Big Bird in Japan (1988)
