= The Monkey's Uncle =

1965 American comedy film by Robert Stevenson

- Theatrical release poster
- Directed by: Robert Stevenson
- Written by: Tom August; Helen August
- Produced by: Ron Miller; Walt Disney
- Starring: Tommy Kirk; Annette Funicello; Leon Ames; Frank Faylen; Arthur O'Connell
- Cinematography: Edward Colman
- Edited by: Cotton Warburton
- Music by: Buddy Baker
- Production company: Walt Disney Productions
- Distributed by: Buena Vista Distribution
- Release date: August 18, 1965 (Los Angeles)
- Running time: 87 minutes
- Country: United States
- Language: English
- Box office: $4,000,000 (US/Canada rentals)

The Monkey's Uncle is a 1965 American comedy film starring Tommy Kirk as genius college student Merlin Jones and Annette Funicello (former Mouseketeer from The Mickey Mouse Club) as his girlfriend, Jennifer. The title plays on the idiom "monkey's uncle" and refers to a chimpanzee named Stanley, Merlin's legal "nephew" (because of a legal arrangement resulting from an experiment to raise Stanley as a human) who otherwise has little relevance to the plot. Jones invents a man-powered airplane and a sleep-learning system. The film is a sequel to 1964's The Misadventures of Merlin Jones.

== Plot ==
The film starts in court, where Merlin Jones legally adopts his monkey, Stanley.

Midvale College is told that a wealthy man, Mr. Astorbilt, will give a large donation, but he has a strange request: He challenges the school to build a man-powered flying machine. If they succeed by a certain date, they get the donation, otherwise it will go to a rival school.

Jones designs a lightweight airplane, powered by a propeller driven by bicycle pedals. Recognizing that even his football-jock friends won't be strong enough for such a feat, he develops a strength elixir (based on adrenaline), which should give the power that a man would need to get off the ground.

To get the jocks' support, he creates "an honest way to cheat", adapting a recently discovered sleep-learning method to help them pass a particularly hard history course. Once the jocks are asleep, a timer starts a record player, with the sound of Merlin's girlfriend, Jennifer, reading their lessons to them. However, this backfires in class: When asked to give an oral report, the jocks speak, but Jennifer's voice comes out. It eventually works out in the students' favor.

Jones gets the jocks' help, and the great day comes. The pilot drinks the elixir, then pedals off into the sky, winning the contest, but the "wealthy donor" is last seen fleeing from men in white coats, who want to take him back to the local mental hospital.

== Cast ==
- Tommy Kirk as Merlin Jones
- Annette Funicello as Jennifer
- Leon Ames as Judge Holmsby
- Arthur O'Connell as Darius Green III
- Frank Faylen as Mr. Dearborne
- Leon Tyler as Leon
- Norm Grabowski as Norman
- Cheryl Miller as Lisa
- Connie Gilchrist as Mrs. Gossett
- Alan Hewitt as Professor Shattuck
- Gage Clarke as College President
- Mark Goddard as Haywood
- Harry Holcombe as Regent
- Alexander Lockwood as Regent
- Harry Antrim as Regent
- Brian Wilson as himself
- Carl Wilson as himself
- Dennis Wilson as himself
- Al Jardine as himself
- Mike Love as himself

== Production notes ==
The Misadventures of Merlin Jones had been a surprise hit, earning over $4 million in rentals for Disney and prompting a sequel. The film was announced in March 1964.

This production marks both Tommy Kirk's and Annette Funicello's last film for the studio. Mark Goddard, who plays Haywood and is best known as Major Don West on television's Lost in Space, made his feature film debut in this film.

Kirk had been fired from Disney due to his homosexuality and by this stage had a drug problem. "Speed, uppers, diet pills — and I got thin as a rake, and I was high all the time," he recalled. "It was a terrible period in my life. So I can understand the: studio letting me go." The studio recalled him to make The Monkey's Uncle. He said "On both of the Merlin Jones things, I was very high on pills. One time I blacked out and fainted doing a scene. I was still hung over from the night before; I was doing a scene and I had to do some kind of a take where I held my breath, and I simply blacked out and fell to the floor."

The screen credit for writing reads, "Screenplay by Tom and Helen August", which were pseudonyms used by Alfred Lewis Levitt and Helen Levitt, two writers who were blacklisted. The home-video release of the film restored the Levitts' credits.

Funicello (billed as "Annette") performs the title track with The Beach Boys over the opening credits. The song was written by the Disney song writing duo, Richard M. Sherman and Robert B. Sherman. Funicello recalled: "They were just beginning. They were wonderful guys and I feel fortunate that I was kind of in on the ground floor. We even worked together performing at Disneyland. Little did any of us know how successful they would become!" She did not know whose idea it had been to bring in the Beach Boys, but felt it was "a stroke of brilliance. As silly as the song is in places, it really does rock and with the Beach Boys' amazing four-part harmonies, I could sing it without echo." She regarded singing with the group as the highlight of her film career at Disney.

Shortly after making the film, Funicello married her agent. This would be the last film she made for Disney until Lots of Luck in 1985.

== Music ==
The title song, written by the Sherman Brothers, is performed by Funicello, with the Beach Boys providing background vocals. This song was covered in 2006 by Devo 2.0 on the album Disneymania, Volume 4.

== Reception ==
=== Critical ===
Richard F. Shepard of The New York Times described The Monkey's Uncle as "an amusing film made with artless artfulness... It all falls into bright, colorful and innocuous non sequitur and, in an hour and a half, you are through, mildly diverted and unburdened by message." Variety noted that the film, "like its predecessor, depends on gimmicks and some nutty situations, which provide mild amusement." Margaret Harford of the Los Angeles Times said that the film "disappoints as a lineal descendant of Disney's Absent Minded Professor but it can hardly miss with the young set." Monthly Film Bulletin wrote that the film was "perhaps slightly funnier for being less extravagant than its predecessor".

=== Box office ===
The film was a box-office success, and earned $4,000,000. Filmink argued this proved "the public didn't care" about Kirk's arrest for drug possession in late 1964.

== Home media ==
The Monkey's Uncle was released on VHS by Walt Disney Home Video in early 1986 as part of "Annette Month", a promotion featuring five films starring Annette Funicello. It was also issued on DVD as part of the "Disney Movie Club" in 2008.

== Works cited ==
- Funicello, Annette; Bashe, Patricia Romanowski (1994). A Dream Is a Wish Your Heart Makes: My Story. Hyperion. ISBN 9780786860203.
