= The Misadventures of Merlin Jones =

1964 film by Robert Stevenson

- Official theatrical poster
- Directed by: Robert Stevenson
- Screenplay by: Tom August; Helen August
- Story by: Bill Walsh
- Produced by: Walt Disney; Ron Miller
- Starring: Tommy Kirk; Annette Funicello; Leon Ames; Stuart Erwin
- Cinematography: Edward Colman
- Edited by: Cotton Warburton
- Music by: Buddy Baker
- Production company: Walt Disney Productions
- Distributed by: Buena Vista Distribution
- Release date: February 11, 1964 (Los Angeles)
- Running time: 91 minutes
- Country: United States
- Language: English
- Box office: $4,000,000 (US/ Canada)

The Misadventures of Merlin Jones is a 1964 American science-fiction comedy film directed by Robert Stevenson and produced by Walt Disney Productions. The film stars Tommy Kirk as a college student who experiments with mindreading and hypnotism, leading to incidents with a local judge. Annette Funicello plays his girlfriend and sings the film's title song, with Leon Ames, Stuart Erwin, Alan Hewitt, Connie Gilchrist and Dallas McKennon in the film's supporting cast.

The film was originally intended as a two-part production for the NBC television show Walt Disney's Wonderful World of Color but received a theatrical release. It was followed by a sequel titled The Monkey's Uncle the following year.

== Plot ==
Midvale College student Merlin Jones, who is always involved with mind experiments, designs a helmet that connects to an electroencephalographic tape that records mental activity. He is brought before Judge Holmsby for wearing the helmet while driving and his license is suspended. Merlin returns to the lab and discovers accidentally that his new invention enables him to read minds.

Judge Holmsby visits the diner where Merlin works part-time, and Merlin, through his newly found powers, learns that the judge is planning a crime. After informing the police, he is disregarded as a crackpot. Merlin and his girlfriend Jennifer break into Judge Holmsby's house in search of evidence to prove Holmsby's criminal intent, but are arrested by the police. Holmsby then confesses that he is the crime book author "Lex Fortis", and asks that this identity be kept confidential.

Merlin's next experiment uses hypnotism. After hypnotizing Stanley, Midvale's lab chimp, into standing up for himself against Norman, the bully student in charge of caring for Stanley, Merlin gets into a fight with Norman, and is brought before Judge Holmsby again. Intrigued by Merlin's experiments, the judge asks for Merlin's help in constructing a mystery plot for his next book.

Working on the premise that no honest person can be made to do anything they would not do otherwise – especially commit a crime – Merlin hypnotizes Holmsby, and instructs him to kidnap Stanley. Shocked when the judge actually commits the crime, Merlin and Jennifer return the chimp, but are charged for the theft themselves. The judge sentences Merlin to jail, completely unaware of his own role in the crime. Livid at the injustice, Jennifer persuades Holmsby of his own guilt, and the good judge admits that a little dishonesty might exist in everybody.

== Cast ==
- Tommy Kirk as Merlin Jones
- Annette Funicello as Jennifer
- Leon Ames as Judge Holmsby/Lex Fortas
- Stuart Erwin as Police Captain Loomis
- Alan Hewitt as Professor Shattuck
- Connie Gilchrist as Mrs. Gossett
- Dallas McKennon as Detective Hutchins
- Norm Grabowski as Norman
- Kelly Thordsen as Motorcycle Cop (uncredited)

== Production ==
Filming took place in January 1963. Originally titled simply Merlin Jones, the film was intended as a two-part production for the 1963-64 season of the NBC television show Walt Disney's Wonderful World of Color. In March 1963, NBC was so pleased with Annette Funicello's performance in the film that it asked Disney to produce two more films with her character, and the film was released theatrically rather than airing on television.

Although the film credits writers Tom and Helen August, the names are pseudonyms for Alfred Lewis Levitt and Helen Levitt, who were blacklisted in Hollywood.

== Reception ==
=== Critical ===
In a contemporary review for The New York Times, critic Eugene Archer wrote:

Movies made for television are commonplace these days, but the idea of screening television shows in movie theaters is still farfetched. Who is expected to spend the $2? Strange as it sounds, this seems to be the explanation behind Walt Disney's latest miss, The Misadventures of Merlin Jones. It is a pastiche of two separate stories with the same set of characters, each running less than an hour (leaving time for commercials), abruptly and pointlessly stitched together in the middle ... Were they intended as the first two parts of a series? Or was the series rejected by the networks and siphoned off to unsuspecting paying customers? The latter possibility seems more likely, since the quality is low even by television standards. ... It's the kind of picture usually dismissed by shrugging, 'Well, at least the kids will like it'. Unless, that is, your children happen to be bright.

Critic Philip K. Scheuer of the Los Angeles Times wrote: "It belongs on television rather than in multiple theaters—but here, nevertheless, it is, all over town."

=== Box office ===
The film grossed more than $4 million in North America. E. Carton Walker, Disney's vice president in charge of advertising, commented that "nobody knows what a picture will do. Merlin Jones grossed $4 million ... and surprised everybody".

== Home media ==
The Misadventures of Merlin Jones was released on VHS by Walt Disney Home Video in early 1986 as part of "Annette Month", a promotion featuring five films starring Annette Funicello.
