= List of children's books made into feature films =

This is a list of works of children's literature that have been made into feature films. The title of the work and the year it was published are both followed by the work's author, the title of the film, and the year of the film. If a film has an alternate title based on geographical distribution, the title listed will be that of the widest distribution area.

== 0–9 ==
Children's book(s)	Film adaptation(s)
The 5th Wave (2013), Rick Yancey	The 5th Wave (2016)
100% Wolf (2008), Jayne Lyons	100% Wolf (2020)
100% Wolf (2008), Jayne Lyons	200% Wolf (2024)

== A ==
Children's book(s)	Film adaptation(s)
Abeltje (1953), Annie M. G. Schmidt	The Flying Liftboy (1998)
The Adventurers: Gamba and His Fifteen Companions (冒険者たち ガンバと15ひきの仲間, Boukenshatachi: Ganba to 15-hiki no Nakama) (1972), Atsuo Saitō	The Adventurers: Gamba and His Fifteen Companions (1984)
The Adventurers: Gamba and His Fifteen Companions (冒険者たち ガンバと15ひきの仲間, Boukenshatachi: Ganba to 15-hiki no Nakama) (1972), Atsuo Saitō	Gamba 3D (ガンバと仲間たち, Gamba: Gamba to Nakama-tachi) (2015)
The Adventures of Captain Hatteras (French: Voyages et aventures du capitaine Hatteras) (1866), Jules Verne	The Conquest of the Pole (1912)
The Adventures of Dennis (Russian: Денискины рассказы) (1959), Viktor Dragunsky	Funny Stories (Russian: Весёлые истории) (1962)
The Adventures of Dennis (Russian: Денискины рассказы) (1959), Viktor Dragunsky	Girl on a Ball (Russian: Девочка на шаре) (1966)
The Adventures of Dennis (Russian: Денискины рассказы) (1959), Viktor Dragunsky	In Secret to the Whole World (Russian: По секрету всему свету) (1977)
The Adventures of Gamba and Otters (ガンバとカワウソの冒険, Gamba to Kawauso no Bouken) (1982), Atsuo Saitō	The Adventures of Gamba and Otters (1991)
The Adventures of Glikko (グリックの冒険, Gurikku no Bōken) (1970), Atsuo Saitō	Enchanted Journey (1981)
Adventures of Huckleberry Finn (1884), Mark Twain	Huckleberry Finn (1920)
Adventures of Huckleberry Finn (1884), Mark Twain	Huckleberry Finn (1931)
Adventures of Huckleberry Finn (1884), Mark Twain	Huck Finn (1937)
Adventures of Huckleberry Finn (1884), Mark Twain	The Adventures of Huckleberry Finn (1939)
Adventures of Huckleberry Finn (1884), Mark Twain	The Adventures of Huckleberry Finn (1955) (Note: Television film.)
Adventures of Huckleberry Finn (1884), Mark Twain	The Adventures of Huckleberry Finn (1960)
Adventures of Huckleberry Finn (1884), Mark Twain	Huckleberry Finn (1974)
Adventures of Huckleberry Finn (1884), Mark Twain	Hopelessly Lost (1972)
Adventures of Huckleberry Finn (1884), Mark Twain	Huckleberry Finn (1975)
Adventures of Huckleberry Finn (1884), Mark Twain	The Adventures of Huckleberry Finn (1981)
Adventures of Huckleberry Finn (1884), Mark Twain	Adventures of Huckleberry Finn (1985)
Adventures of Huckleberry Finn (1884), Mark Twain	The Adventures of Mark Twain (1985)
Adventures of Huckleberry Finn (1884), Mark Twain	The Adventures of Huck Finn (1993)
Adventures of Huckleberry Finn (1884), Mark Twain	Huck and the King of Hearts (1994) (Note: Direct-to-video film.)
Adventures of Huckleberry Finn (1884), Mark Twain	The Adventures of Huck Finn (German: Die Abenteuer des Huck Finn) (2012)
The Adventures of Maya the Bee (German: Die Biene Maja und ihre Abenteuer) (1912), Waldemar Bonsels	The Adventures of Maya the Bee (1926)
The Adventures of Maya the Bee (German: Die Biene Maja und ihre Abenteuer) (1912), Waldemar Bonsels	Maya the Bee (2015)
The Adventures of Maya the Bee (German: Die Biene Maja und ihre Abenteuer) (1912), Waldemar Bonsels	Maya the Bee: The Honey Games (2018)
The Adventures of Maya the Bee (German: Die Biene Maja und ihre Abenteuer) (1912), Waldemar Bonsels	Maya the Bee: The Golden Orb (2021)
The Adventures of Pinocchio (Italian: Le avventure di Pinocchio. Storia di un burattino) (1883), Carlo Collodi	The Adventures of Pinocchio (1911)
The Adventures of Pinocchio (Italian: Le avventure di Pinocchio. Storia di un burattino) (1883), Carlo Collodi	The Adventures of Pinocchio (1936) (Note: Unfinished, considered a lost film.)
The Adventures of Pinocchio (Italian: Le avventure di Pinocchio. Storia di un burattino) (1883), Carlo Collodi	Pinocchio (1940)
The Adventures of Pinocchio (Italian: Le avventure di Pinocchio. Storia di un burattino) (1883), Carlo Collodi	The Adventures of Pinocchio (Italian: Le avventure di Pinocchio) (1947)
The Adventures of Pinocchio (Italian: Le avventure di Pinocchio. Storia di un burattino) (1883), Carlo Collodi	Pinocchio (1957)
The Adventures of Pinocchio (Italian: Le avventure di Pinocchio. Storia di un burattino) (1883), Carlo Collodi	Pinocchio in Outer Space (1965)
The Adventures of Pinocchio (Italian: Le avventure di Pinocchio. Storia di un burattino) (1883), Carlo Collodi	Pinocchio (German: Turlis Abenteuer) (1967)
The Adventures of Pinocchio (Italian: Le avventure di Pinocchio. Storia di un burattino) (1883), Carlo Collodi	Pinocchio (1968)
The Adventures of Pinocchio (Italian: Le avventure di Pinocchio. Storia di un burattino) (1883), Carlo Collodi	The Erotic Adventures of Pinocchio (1971)
The Adventures of Pinocchio (Italian: Le avventure di Pinocchio. Storia di un burattino) (1883), Carlo Collodi	The Adventures of Pinocchio (Italian: Un burattino di nome Pinocchio) (1972)
The Adventures of Pinocchio (Italian: Le avventure di Pinocchio. Storia di un burattino) (1883), Carlo Collodi	Pinocchio (1976)
The Adventures of Pinocchio (Italian: Le avventure di Pinocchio. Storia di un burattino) (1883), Carlo Collodi	Pinocchio's Christmas (1980)
The Adventures of Pinocchio (Italian: Le avventure di Pinocchio. Storia di un burattino) (1883), Carlo Collodi	The Adventures of Pinocchio (1984)
The Adventures of Pinocchio (Italian: Le avventure di Pinocchio. Storia di un burattino) (1883), Carlo Collodi	Pinocchio and the Emperor of the Night (1987)
The Adventures of Pinocchio (Italian: Le avventure di Pinocchio. Storia di un burattino) (1883), Carlo Collodi	Pinocchio (1992)
The Adventures of Pinocchio (Italian: Le avventure di Pinocchio. Storia di un burattino) (1883), Carlo Collodi	The Adventures of Pinocchio (1996)
The Adventures of Pinocchio (Italian: Le avventure di Pinocchio. Storia di un burattino) (1883), Carlo Collodi	The New Adventures of Pinocchio (1999)
The Adventures of Pinocchio (Italian: Le avventure di Pinocchio. Storia di un burattino) (1883), Carlo Collodi	Pinocchio, ovvero lo spettacolo della Provvidenza (1999)
The Adventures of Pinocchio (Italian: Le avventure di Pinocchio. Storia di un burattino) (1883), Carlo Collodi	Geppetto (2000)
The Adventures of Pinocchio (Italian: Le avventure di Pinocchio. Storia di un burattino) (1883), Carlo Collodi	Pinocchio (2002)
The Adventures of Pinocchio (Italian: Le avventure di Pinocchio. Storia di un burattino) (1883), Carlo Collodi	Pinocchio 3000 (2004)
The Adventures of Pinocchio (Italian: Le avventure di Pinocchio. Storia di un burattino) (1883), Carlo Collodi	Welcome Back Pinocchio (Italian: Bentornato Pinocchio) (2007)
The Adventures of Pinocchio (Italian: Le avventure di Pinocchio. Storia di un burattino) (1883), Carlo Collodi	Pinocchio (2008)
The Adventures of Pinocchio (Italian: Le avventure di Pinocchio. Storia di un burattino) (1883), Carlo Collodi	Pistachio – The Little Boy That Woodn't (2010)
The Adventures of Pinocchio (Italian: Le avventure di Pinocchio. Storia di un burattino) (1883), Carlo Collodi	Pinocchio (2012)
The Adventures of Pinocchio (Italian: Le avventure di Pinocchio. Storia di un burattino) (1883), Carlo Collodi	Pinocchio (2019)
The Adventures of Pinocchio (Italian: Le avventure di Pinocchio. Storia di un burattino) (1883), Carlo Collodi	Pinocchio: A True Story (2021)
The Adventures of Pinocchio (Italian: Le avventure di Pinocchio. Storia di un burattino) (1883), Carlo Collodi	Pinocchio (2022) (Note: Remake of the Disney film.)
The Adventures of Pinocchio (Italian: Le avventure di Pinocchio. Storia di un burattino) (1883), Carlo Collodi	Guillermo del Toro's Pinocchio (2022)
The Adventures of Pinocchio (Italian: Le avventure di Pinocchio. Storia di un burattino) (1883), Carlo Collodi	Pinocchio Unstrung (2026)
The Adventures of Tom Sawyer (1876), Mark Twain	Tom Sawyer (1917)
The Adventures of Tom Sawyer (1876), Mark Twain	Huck and Tom (1918)
The Adventures of Tom Sawyer (1876), Mark Twain	Tom Sawyer (1930)
The Adventures of Tom Sawyer (1876), Mark Twain	Tom Sawyer (1936)
The Adventures of Tom Sawyer (1876), Mark Twain	The Adventures of Tom Sawyer (1938)
The Adventures of Tom Sawyer (1876), Mark Twain	Tom Sawyer, Detective (1938)
The Adventures of Tom Sawyer (1876), Mark Twain	The Adventures of Mark Twain (1944)
The Adventures of Tom Sawyer (1876), Mark Twain	Dobrodružství Toma Sawyera (1967)
The Adventures of Tom Sawyer (1876), Mark Twain	Aventurile lui Tom Sawyer (1968)
The Adventures of Tom Sawyer (1876), Mark Twain	Moartea lui Joe Indianul (1968)
The Adventures of Tom Sawyer (1876), Mark Twain	Las Aventuras de Juliancito (1969)
The Adventures of Tom Sawyer (1876), Mark Twain	Tom Sawyer (1973)
The Adventures of Tom Sawyer (1876), Mark Twain	Mark Twain's Tom Sawyer (1973)
The Adventures of Tom Sawyer (1876), Mark Twain	Páni kluci (1976)
The Adventures of Tom Sawyer (1876), Mark Twain	Rascals and Robbers: The Secret Adventures of Tom Sawyer and Huckleberry Finn (1982)
The Adventures of Tom Sawyer (1876), Mark Twain	Sawyer and Finn (1983)
The Adventures of Tom Sawyer (1876), Mark Twain	Tom Sawyer (1984)
The Adventures of Tom Sawyer (1876), Mark Twain	The Adventures of Mark Twain (1985)
The Adventures of Tom Sawyer (1876), Mark Twain	The Adventures of Tom Sawyer (1986)
The Adventures of Tom Sawyer (1876), Mark Twain	Back to Hannibal: The Return of Tom Sawyer and Huckleberry Finn (1990)
The Adventures of Tom Sawyer (1876), Mark Twain	Tom and Huck (1995)
The Adventures of Tom Sawyer (1876), Mark Twain	The Animated Adventures of Tom Sawyer (1998)
The Adventures of Tom Sawyer (1876), Mark Twain	The Modern Adventures of Tom Sawyer (1998)
The Adventures of Tom Sawyer (1876), Mark Twain	Tom Sawyer (2000)
The Adventures of Tom Sawyer (1876), Mark Twain	Tom Sawyer (2011)
The Adventures of Tom Sawyer (1876), Mark Twain	Tom and Huck (German: Tom und Hacke) (2012)
The Adventures of Tom Sawyer (1876), Mark Twain	Tom Sawyer & Huckleberry Finn (2014)
The Adventures of Tom Sawyer (1876), Mark Twain	Band of Robbers (2015)
The Adventures of Tom Sawyer (1876), Mark Twain	The Adventures of Thomasina Sawyer (2018)
The Adventures of Tom Sawyer (1876), Mark Twain	The Science Adventures of Tom & Huck (2025)
Alexander and the Terrible, Horrible, No Good, Very Bad Day (1972), Judith Viorst	Alexander and the Terrible, Horrible, No Good, Very Bad Day (2014)
Alexander and the Terrible, Horrible, No Good, Very Bad Day (1972), Judith Viorst	Alexander and the Terrible, Horrible, No Good, Very Bad Road Trip (2025)
Alice (1985–2013) (series), Phyllis Reynolds Naylor	Alice Upside Down (2008)
Alice's Adventures in Wonderland (1865), Lewis Carroll	Alice in Wonderland (1915)
Alice's Adventures in Wonderland (1865), Lewis Carroll	Alice in Wonderland (1931)
Alice's Adventures in Wonderland (1865), Lewis Carroll	Alice in Wonderland (1933)
Alice's Adventures in Wonderland (1865), Lewis Carroll	Alice in Wonderland (1949)
Alice's Adventures in Wonderland (1865), Lewis Carroll	Alice in Wonderland (1951)
Alice's Adventures in Wonderland (1865), Lewis Carroll	Alice in Wonderland (1955)
Alice's Adventures in Wonderland (1865), Lewis Carroll	The Adventures of Alice (1960)
Alice's Adventures in Wonderland (1865), Lewis Carroll	Alice of Wonderland in Paris (1966)
Alice's Adventures in Wonderland (1865), Lewis Carroll	Alice in Wonderland or What's a Nice Kid like You Doing in a Place like This? (1966)
Alice's Adventures in Wonderland (1865), Lewis Carroll	Alice in Wonderland (1966)
Alice's Adventures in Wonderland (1865), Lewis Carroll	Alice in Wonderland (French: Alice au pays des merveilles) (1970)
Alice's Adventures in Wonderland (1865), Lewis Carroll	Alice's Adventures in Wonderland (1972)
Alice's Adventures in Wonderland (1865), Lewis Carroll	Alice in Wonderland (1976)
Alice's Adventures in Wonderland (1865), Lewis Carroll	Alice in Wonderland (French: Alicia en el país de las maravillas) (1976)
Alice's Adventures in Wonderland (1865), Lewis Carroll	Alice or the Last Escapade (French: Alice ou la dernière fugue) (1977)
Alice's Adventures in Wonderland (1865), Lewis Carroll	Alice in Spanish Wonderland (Spanish: Alicia en la España de las maravillas) (1978)
Alice's Adventures in Wonderland (1865), Lewis Carroll	Alice (Polish: Alicja) (1982)
Alice's Adventures in Wonderland (1865), Lewis Carroll	Alice at the Palace (1982)
Alice's Adventures in Wonderland (1865), Lewis Carroll	Alice in Wonderland (1982)
Alice's Adventures in Wonderland (1865), Lewis Carroll	Alice in Wonderland (1983)
Alice's Adventures in Wonderland (1865), Lewis Carroll	Alice in Wonderland (1985)
Alice's Adventures in Wonderland (1865), Lewis Carroll	Dreamchild (1985)
Alice's Adventures in Wonderland (1865), Lewis Carroll	The Care Bears Adventure in Wonderland (1987)
Alice's Adventures in Wonderland (1865), Lewis Carroll	Alice in Wonderland (1988)
Alice's Adventures in Wonderland (1865), Lewis Carroll	Alice (Czech: Něco z Alenky) (1988)
Alice's Adventures in Wonderland (1865), Lewis Carroll	Alice in Wonderland (1995)
Alice's Adventures in Wonderland (1865), Lewis Carroll	Alice in Wonderland (1999)
Alice's Adventures in Wonderland (1865), Lewis Carroll	Alice in Wonderland: What's the Matter with Hatter? (2007)
Alice's Adventures in Wonderland (1865), Lewis Carroll	Alice in Wonderland (2010)
Alice's Adventures in Wonderland (1865), Lewis Carroll	Alice in Wonderland (2011)
Alisa Seleznyova (1965–2002) (series), Kir Bulychev	The Mystery of the Third Planet (1981)
Alisa Seleznyova (1965–2002) (series), Kir Bulychev	Lilac Ball (1987)
Alisa Seleznyova (1965–2002) (series), Kir Bulychev	Prisoners of Yamagiri-Maru (1988)
Alisa Seleznyova (1965–2002) (series), Kir Bulychev	Island of Rusty General (1988)
Alisa Seleznyova (1965–2002) (series), Kir Bulychev	Alice's Birthday (2009)
Alisa Seleznyova (1965–2002) (series), Kir Bulychev	One Hundred Years Ahead (2024)
The Amazing Maurice and His Educated Rodents (2001), Terry Pratchett	The Amazing Maurice (2022)
Amazing Adventures from Zoom's Academy (2005), Jason Lethcoe	Zoom (2006)
American Girl (1986–present) (series), various authors	American Girl (2004–2017) (series)
Angus, Thongs and Full-Frontal Snogging (1999), Louise Rennison	Angus, Thongs and Perfect Snogging (2008)
The Animals' Conference (German: Die Konferenz der Tiere) (1949), Erich Kästner	Die Konferenz der Tiere (1969)
The Animals' Conference (German: Die Konferenz der Tiere) (1949), Erich Kästner	Animals United (2010)
The Animals' Conference (German: Die Konferenz der Tiere) (1949), Erich Kästner	Pets United (2019)
Anne of Avonlea (1909), Lucy Maud Montgomery	Anne of Avonlea (1987)
Anne of Green Gables (1908), Lucy Maud Montgomery	Anne of Green Gables (1919)
Anne of Green Gables (1908), Lucy Maud Montgomery	Anne of Green Gables (1934)
Anne of Green Gables (1908), Lucy Maud Montgomery	Anne of Green Gables (1956)
Anne of Green Gables (1908), Lucy Maud Montgomery	Anne of Green Gables (1985)
Anne of Green Gables (1908), Lucy Maud Montgomery	Anne of Green Gables: The Continuing Story (2000)
Anne of Green Gables (1908), Lucy Maud Montgomery	Anne of Green Gables: A New Beginning (2009)
Anne of Windy Poplars (1936), Lucy Maud Montgomery	Anne of Windy Poplars (1940)
The Ant Bully (1999), John Nickle	The Ant Bully (2006)
The Apple Dumpling Gang (1971), Jack Bickham	The Apple Dumpling Gang (1975)
The Apple Dumpling Gang (1971), Jack Bickham	The Apple Dumpling Gang Rides Again (1979)
The Apple Dumpling Gang (1971), Jack Bickham	Tales from the Apple Dumpling Gang (1982)
Aquamarine (2001), Alice Hoffman	Aquamarine (2006)
Argument About Basia (Polish: Awantura o Basię) (1937), Kornel Makuszyński	Argument About Basia (1959)
Argument About Basia (Polish: Awantura o Basię) (1937), Kornel Makuszyński	Argument About Basia (1995)
Around the World in Eighty Days (French: Le tour du monde en quatre-vingts jours) (1873), Jules Verne	Die Jagd nach der Hundertpfundnote oder Die Reise um die Welt (1913)
Around the World in Eighty Days (French: Le tour du monde en quatre-vingts jours) (1873), Jules Verne	'Round the World in 80 Days (1914)
Around the World in Eighty Days (French: Le tour du monde en quatre-vingts jours) (1873), Jules Verne	Around the World in Eighty Days (1919)
Around the World in Eighty Days (French: Le tour du monde en quatre-vingts jours) (1873), Jules Verne	Around the World in 80 Days (1956)
Around the World in Eighty Days (French: Le tour du monde en quatre-vingts jours) (1873), Jules Verne	The Three Stooges Go Around the World in a Daze (1963)
Around the World in Eighty Days (French: Le tour du monde en quatre-vingts jours) (1873), Jules Verne	Around the World in Eighty Days (1972; made in Australia)
Around the World in Eighty Days (French: Le tour du monde en quatre-vingts jours) (1873), Jules Verne	Around the World in Eighty Days (1972; made in Canada)
Around the World in Eighty Days (French: Le tour du monde en quatre-vingts jours) (1873), Jules Verne	Around the World in 80 Ways (1988)
Around the World in Eighty Days (French: Le tour du monde en quatre-vingts jours) (1873), Jules Verne	Around the World in 80 Days (1988)
Around the World in Eighty Days (French: Le tour du monde en quatre-vingts jours) (1873), Jules Verne	Around the World in 80 Days (German: Reise um die Erde in 80 Tagen) (1998)
Around the World in Eighty Days (French: Le tour du monde en quatre-vingts jours) (1873), Jules Verne	Tweety's High-Flying Adventure (2000)
Around the World in Eighty Days (French: Le tour du monde en quatre-vingts jours) (1873), Jules Verne	Globehunters: An Around the World in 80 Days Adventure (2002)
Around the World in Eighty Days (French: Le tour du monde en quatre-vingts jours) (1873), Jules Verne	Around the World in 80 Days (2004)
Around the World in Eighty Days (French: Le tour du monde en quatre-vingts jours) (1873), Jules Verne	Around the World in 80 Days (2021)
Artemis Fowl (2001-2012) (series), Eoin Colfer	Artemis Fowl (2020) (Note: Disney+ film.)
Arthur Adventure (1976–2011) (series), Marc Brown	Arthur's Missing Pal (2006)

== B ==
Children's book(s)	Film adaptation(s)
Babar the Elephant (1931–2011) (series), Jean de Brunhoff and Laurent de Brunhoff	Babar: The Movie (1989)
Babar the Elephant (1931–2011) (series), Jean de Brunhoff and Laurent de Brunhoff	Babar: King of the Elephants (1999)
The Baby-sitters Club (1986–2000, 2010) (series), Ann M. Martin and Peter Lerangis	The Baby-Sitters Club (1995)
The Bad Guys (2015–2024) (series), Aaron Blabey	The Bad Guys (2022)
The Bad Guys (2015–2024) (series), Aaron Blabey	The Bad Guys 2 (2025)
Ballet Shoes (1936), Noel Streatfeild	Ballet Shoes (2007)
Bambi, a Life in the Woods (German: Bambi: Eine Lebensgeschichte aus dem Walde) (1923), Felix Salten	Bambi (1942)
Bambi, a Life in the Woods (German: Bambi: Eine Lebensgeschichte aus dem Walde) (1923), Felix Salten	Bambi II (2006) (Note: Sequel to the 1942 animated film.)
Bambi, a Life in the Woods (German: Bambi: Eine Lebensgeschichte aus dem Walde) (1923), Felix Salten	Bambi: The Reckoning (2025)
Banner in the Sky (1954), James Ramsey Ullman	Third Man on the Mountain (1959)
Basil of Baker Street (1958), Eve Titus	The Great Mouse Detective (1986)
Beastly (2007), Alex Flinn	Beastly (2011)
Beautiful Creatures (2009), Kami Garcia and Margaret Stohl	Beautiful Creatures (2013)
"Beauty and the Beast" (French: La Belle et la Bête), from Children's Collection (French: Magasin des enfants) (1756), Jeanne-Marie Leprince de Beaumont	Beauty and the Beast (1946)
"Beauty and the Beast" (French: La Belle et la Bête), from Children's Collection (French: Magasin des enfants) (1756), Jeanne-Marie Leprince de Beaumont	Beauty and the Beast (1962)
"Beauty and the Beast" (French: La Belle et la Bête), from Children's Collection (French: Magasin des enfants) (1756), Jeanne-Marie Leprince de Beaumont	Beauty and the Beast (1976)
"Beauty and the Beast" (French: La Belle et la Bête), from Children's Collection (French: Magasin des enfants) (1756), Jeanne-Marie Leprince de Beaumont	Beauty and the Beast (Czech: Panna a netvor) (1978)
"Beauty and the Beast" (French: La Belle et la Bête), from Children's Collection (French: Magasin des enfants) (1756), Jeanne-Marie Leprince de Beaumont	Beauty and the Beast (1983)
"Beauty and the Beast" (French: La Belle et la Bête), from Children's Collection (French: Magasin des enfants) (1756), Jeanne-Marie Leprince de Beaumont	Beauty and the Beast (1987)
"Beauty and the Beast" (French: La Belle et la Bête), from Children's Collection (French: Magasin des enfants) (1756), Jeanne-Marie Leprince de Beaumont	Beauty and the Beast (1991)
"Beauty and the Beast" (French: La Belle et la Bête), from Children's Collection (French: Magasin des enfants) (1756), Jeanne-Marie Leprince de Beaumont	Beauty and the Beast (1992, Golden Films)
"Beauty and the Beast" (French: La Belle et la Bête), from Children's Collection (French: Magasin des enfants) (1756), Jeanne-Marie Leprince de Beaumont	Beauty and the Beast (1992, Bevanfield Films)
"Beauty and the Beast" (French: La Belle et la Bête), from Children's Collection (French: Magasin des enfants) (1756), Jeanne-Marie Leprince de Beaumont	Beauty and the Beast (1996)
"Beauty and the Beast" (French: La Belle et la Bête), from Children's Collection (French: Magasin des enfants) (1756), Jeanne-Marie Leprince de Beaumont	Beauty and the Beast (1997)
"Beauty and the Beast" (French: La Belle et la Bête), from Children's Collection (French: Magasin des enfants) (1756), Jeanne-Marie Leprince de Beaumont	Beauty and the Beast: The Enchanted Christmas (1997)
"Beauty and the Beast" (French: La Belle et la Bête), from Children's Collection (French: Magasin des enfants) (1756), Jeanne-Marie Leprince de Beaumont	Belle's Magical World (1998)
"Beauty and the Beast" (French: La Belle et la Bête), from Children's Collection (French: Magasin des enfants) (1756), Jeanne-Marie Leprince de Beaumont	Belle's Tales of Friendship (1999)
"Beauty and the Beast" (French: La Belle et la Bête), from Children's Collection (French: Magasin des enfants) (1756), Jeanne-Marie Leprince de Beaumont	Beauty and the Beast (German: Die Schöne und das Biest) (2012)
"Beauty and the Beast" (French: La Belle et la Bête), from Children's Collection (French: Magasin des enfants) (1756), Jeanne-Marie Leprince de Beaumont	Beauty and the Beast (2017)
"Beauty and the Beast" (French: La Belle et la Bête), from Children's Collection (French: Magasin des enfants) (1756), Jeanne-Marie Leprince de Beaumont	Belle (Japanese: 竜とそばかすの姫, Ryū to Sobakasu no Hime) (2021)
Bedknob and Broomstick (1957) (Note: Originally published as two separate works: The Magic Bedknob; or, How to Become a Witch in Ten Easy Lessons (1944) and Bonfires and Broomsticks (1947).), Mary Norton	Bedknobs and Broomsticks (1971)
Because of Winn-Dixie (2000), Kate DiCamillo	Because of Winn-Dixie (2005)
Before I Fall (2010), Lauren Oliver	Before I Fall (2017)
Ben-Hur: A Tale of the Christ (1880), Lew Wallace	Ben-Hur (1925)
Ben-Hur: A Tale of the Christ (1880), Lew Wallace	Ben-Hur (1959)
Ben-Hur: A Tale of the Christ (1880), Lew Wallace	Ben Hur (2003)
Ben-Hur: A Tale of the Christ (1880), Lew Wallace	Ben-Hur (2016)
The BFG (1982), Roald Dahl	The BFG (1989)
The BFG (1982), Roald Dahl	The BFG (2016)
Big Fish: A Novel of Mythic Proportions (1998), Daniel Wallace	Big Fish (2003)
The Big Fisherman (1948), Lloyd C. Douglas	The Big Fisherman (1959)
Big Red (1945), Jim Kjelgaard	Big Red (1962)
Biggles (1932–1968) (series), W. E. Johns	Biggles: Adventures in Time (1986)
Biggles (1932–1968) (series), W. E. Johns	It Couldn't Happen Here (1988)
Billionaire Boy (2010), David Walliams	Billionaire Boy (2016)
The Black Arrow: A Tale of the Two Roses (1888), Robert Louis Stevenson	The Black Arrow (1911)
The Black Arrow: A Tale of the Two Roses (1888), Robert Louis Stevenson	The Black Arrow (1943)
The Black Arrow: A Tale of the Two Roses (1888), Robert Louis Stevenson	Black Arrow (1985)
The Black Arrow: A Tale of the Two Roses (1888), Robert Louis Stevenson	The Black Arrow (Russian: Чёрная стрела) (1987)
The Black Arrow: A Tale of the Two Roses (1888), Robert Louis Stevenson	The Black Arrow (1988)
Black Beauty (1877), Anna Sewell	Your Obedient Servant (1917)
Black Beauty (1877), Anna Sewell	Black Beauty (1921)
Black Beauty (1877), Anna Sewell	Black Beauty (1933)
Black Beauty (1877), Anna Sewell	Black Beauty (1946)
Black Beauty (1877), Anna Sewell	Courage of Black Beauty (1958)
Black Beauty (1877), Anna Sewell	Black Beauty (1971)
Black Beauty (1877), Anna Sewell	Black Beauty (1987)
Black Beauty (1877), Anna Sewell	Black Beauty (1994)
Black Beauty (1877), Anna Sewell	Black Beauty (1995)
Black Beauty (1877), Anna Sewell	Black Beauty (2020)
The Black Stallion (1941–1989) (series) (Note: Works adapted from the series in chronological order: the first (The Black Stallion (1941)), the second (The Black Stallion Returns (1945)), and the twentieth (The Young Black Stallion (1989)) respectively.), Walter Farley	The Black Stallion (1979)
The Black Stallion (1941–1989) (series), Walter Farley	The Black Stallion Returns (1983)
The Black Stallion (1941–1989) (series), Walter Farley	The Young Black Stallion (2003)
Blackbeard's Ghost (1965), Ben Stahl	Blackbeard's Ghost (1968)
Blood and Chocolate (1997), Annette Curtis Klause	Blood and Chocolate (2007)
The Blue Bird for Children (1913) (Note: Based on the play The Blue Bird (1908) by Maurice Maeterlinck.), Georgette Leblanc	The Blue Bird (1918)
The Blue Bird for Children (1913), Georgette Leblanc	The Blue Bird (1940)
The Blue Bird for Children (1913), Georgette Leblanc	The Blue Bird (Russian: Синяя птица, Sinyaya Ptitsa) (1970)
The Blue Bird for Children (1913), Georgette Leblanc	The Blue Bird (1976)
The Blue Bird for Children (1913), Georgette Leblanc	Kiki and Lala's Blue Bird (キキとララの青い鳥, Kiki to Lala no Aoi Tori) (1989)
The Blue Bird for Children (1913), Georgette Leblanc	Blue Bird (2011)
The Book Thief (2005), Markus Zusak	The Book Thief (2013)
The Borrowers (1952), Mary Norton	The Borrowers (1973)
The Borrowers (1952), Mary Norton	The Borrowers (1997)
The Borrowers (1952), Mary Norton	Arrietty (2010)
The Borrowers (1952), Mary Norton	The Borrowers (2011)
The Boss Baby (2010), Marla Frazee	The Boss Baby (2017)
The Boss Baby (2010), Marla Frazee	The Boss Baby: Family Business (2021)
The Boy in the Dress (2008), David Walliams	The Boy in the Dress (2014)
The Boy in the Striped Pyjamas (2006), John Boyne	The Boy in the Striped Pajamas (2008)
The Brave Little Toaster (1986), Thomas M. Disch	The Brave Little Toaster (1987)
The Brave Little Toaster (1986), Thomas M. Disch	The Brave Little Toaster to the Rescue (1997)
The Brave Little Toaster Goes to Mars (1988), Thomas M. Disch	The Brave Little Toaster Goes to Mars (1998)
The Breadwinner (2000), Deborah Ellis	The Breadwinner (2017)
Breaking Smith's Quarter Horse (1966), Paul St. Pierre	Smith! (1969)
Bridge to Terabithia (1977), Katherine Paterson	Bridge to Terabithia (1985)
Bridge to Terabithia (1977), Katherine Paterson	Bridge to Terabithia (2007)
The Brothers Lionheart (Swedish: Bröderna Lejonhjärta) (1973), Astrid Lindgren	The Brothers Lionheart (1977)
By the Great Horn Spoon! (1963), Sid Fleischman	The Adventures of Bullwhip Griffin (1967)

== C ==
Children's book(s)	Film adaptation(s)
Caillou (1989–present) (series) Christine L'Heureux and Hélène Desputeaux	Caillou's Holiday Movie (2003)
Call It Courage (1940), Armstrong Sperry	Call It Courage (1973)
The Call of the Wild (1903), Jack London	The Call of the Wild (1923)
The Call of the Wild (1903), Jack London	Call of the Wild (1935)
The Call of the Wild (1903), Jack London	The Call of the Wild (1972)
The Call of the Wild (1903), Jack London	The Great Adventure (Italian: Il richiamo del lupo) (1975)
The Call of the Wild (1903), Jack London	The Call of the Wild (1976)
The Call of the Wild (1903), Jack London	The Call of the Wild: Howl, Buck (荒野の叫び声 吠えろバック, Kōya no Sakebigoe: Hoero Bakku) (1981)
The Call of the Wild (1903), Jack London	The Call of the Wild (1990)
The Call of the Wild (1903), Jack London	Buck at the Edge of Heaven (Italian: Buck ai confini del cielo) (1992)
The Call of the Wild (1903), Jack London	The Call of the Wild (1993)
The Call of the Wild (1903), Jack London	Call of the Wild (1996)
The Call of the Wild (1903), Jack London	The Call of the Wild: Dog of the Yukon (1997)
The Call of the Wild (1903), Jack London	Buck and the Magic Bracelet (Italian: Buck e il braccialetto magico) (1999)
The Call of the Wild (1903), Jack London	Call of the Wild (2009)
The Call of the Wild (1903), Jack London	The Call of the Wild (2020)
Captain Underpants (1997–2015) (series) (Note: Plot primarily adapted from the first work (The Adventures of Captain Underpants (1997)) with characters and elements used from the second (The Attack of the Talking Toilets (1999)) and the fourth (The Perilous Plot of Professor Poopypants (2000)) respectively.), Dav Pilkey	Captain Underpants: The First Epic Movie (2017)
The Cat in the Hat (1957), Dr. Seuss	The Cat in the Hat (2003)
The Cat in the Hat (1957), Dr. Seuss	The Cat in the Hat (2026)
"The Cat that Walked by Himself", from Just So Stories (1902), Rudyard Kipling	The Cat Who Walked by Herself (1988)
Charlie and the Chocolate Factory (1964), Roald Dahl	Willy Wonka & the Chocolate Factory (1971)
Charlie and the Chocolate Factory (1964), Roald Dahl	Charlie and the Chocolate Factory (2005)
Charlie and the Chocolate Factory (1964), Roald Dahl	Tom and Jerry: Willy Wonka and the Chocolate Factory (2017)
Charlie and the Chocolate Factory (1964), Roald Dahl	Wonka (2023)
Charlotte's Web (1952), E. B. White	Charlotte's Web (1973)
Charlotte's Web (1952), E. B. White	Charlotte's Web 2: Wilbur's Great Adventure (2003)
Charlotte's Web (1952), E. B. White	Charlotte's Web (2006)
Chateau Bon Vivant (1967), Frankie O'Rear and John O'Rear	Snowball Express (1972)
The Cheetah Girls (1999–2006) (series), Deborah Gregory	The Cheetah Girls (2003)
The Cheetah Girls (1999–2006) (series), Deborah Gregory	The Cheetah Girls 2 (2006)
The Cheetah Girls (1999–2006) (series), Deborah Gregory	The Cheetah Girls: One World (2008)
Chitty-Chitty-Bang-Bang: The Magical Car (1964), Ian Fleming	Chitty Chitty Bang Bang (1968)
The Chocolate War (1974), Robert Cormier	The Chocolate War (1988)
The Christmas Box (1994), Richard Paul Evans	The Christmas Box (1995)
The Chronicles of Narnia (1950–1956) (series) (Note: Plots and elements adapted from three related works: The Lion, the Witch and the Wardrobe (1950), Prince Caspian (1951) and The Voyage of the Dawn Treader (1952) respectively.), C.S. Lewis	The Lion, the Witch and the Wardrobe (1979)
The Chronicles of Narnia (1950–1956) (series), C.S. Lewis	The Chronicles of Narnia: The Lion, the Witch and the Wardrobe (2005) (Note: The Chronicles of Narnia (film series))
The Chronicles of Narnia (1950–1956) (series), C.S. Lewis	The Chronicles of Narnia: Prince Caspian (2008)
The Chronicles of Narnia (1950–1956) (series), C.S. Lewis	The Chronicles of Narnia: The Voyage of the Dawn Treader (2010)
The Chronicles of Prydain (1964–1968) (series) (Note: Plot adapted from two related works: The Book of Three (1964) and The Black Cauldron (1965) respectively, with the latter taken its title.), Lloyd Alexander	The Black Cauldron (1985)
"Cinderella" (French: Cendrillon), from Stories or Tales from Past Times, with Morals (French: Histoires ou contes du temps passé) (1697), Charles Perrault	Cinderella (1914)
"Cinderella" (French: Cendrillon), from Stories or Tales from Past Times, with Morals (French: Histoires ou contes du temps passé) (1697), Charles Perrault	Cinderella (1947)
"Cinderella" (French: Cendrillon), from Stories or Tales from Past Times, with Morals (French: Histoires ou contes du temps passé) (1697), Charles Perrault	Cinderella (1950)
"Cinderella" (French: Cendrillon), from Stories or Tales from Past Times, with Morals (French: Histoires ou contes du temps passé) (1697), Charles Perrault	The Glass Slipper (1955)
"Cinderella" (French: Cendrillon), from Stories or Tales from Past Times, with Morals (French: Histoires ou contes du temps passé) (1697), Charles Perrault	Cinderella (1994)
"Cinderella" (French: Cendrillon), from Stories or Tales from Past Times, with Morals (French: Histoires ou contes du temps passé) (1697), Charles Perrault	Ever After (1998)
"Cinderella" (French: Cendrillon), from Stories or Tales from Past Times, with Morals (French: Histoires ou contes du temps passé) (1697), Charles Perrault	Cinderella II: Dreams Come True (2002)
"Cinderella" (French: Cendrillon), from Stories or Tales from Past Times, with Morals (French: Histoires ou contes du temps passé) (1697), Charles Perrault	Cinderella III: A Twist in Time (2007)
"Cinderella" (French: Cendrillon), from Stories or Tales from Past Times, with Morals (French: Histoires ou contes du temps passé) (1697), Charles Perrault	Cinderella (2015)
"Cinderella" (French: Cendrillon), from Stories or Tales from Past Times, with Morals (French: Histoires ou contes du temps passé) (1697), Charles Perrault	Cinderella (2021)
The City of Ember (2003), Jeanne DuPrau	City of Ember (2008)
Clifford the Big Red Dog (1963—2011) (series), Norman Bridwell	Clifford's Really Big Movie (2004)
Clifford the Big Red Dog (1963—2011) (series), Norman Bridwell	Clifford the Big Red Dog (2021)
Cloudy with a Chance of Meatballs (1978), Judi Barrett	Cloudy with a Chance of Meatballs (2009)
Cloudy with a Chance of Meatballs (1978), Judi Barrett	Cloudy with a Chance of Meatballs 2 (2013)
The Complete Adventures of Blinky Bill (1939) (Note: Originally published as three separate works: Blinky Bill: The Quaint Little Australian (1933), Blinky Bill Grows Up (1934) and Blinky Bill and Nutsy: Two Little Australians (1937).), Dorothy Wall	Blinky Bill: The Mischievous Koala (1992)
The Complete Adventures of Blinky Bill (1939), Dorothy Wall	Blinky Bill’s White Christmas (2005)
The Complete Adventures of Blinky Bill (1939), Dorothy Wall	Blinky Bill the Movie (2015)
Confessions of a Teenage Drama Queen (1999), Dyan Sheldon	Confessions of a Teenage Drama Queen (2004)
A Connecticut Yankee in King Arthur's Court (1889), Mark Twain	A Connecticut Yankee in King Arthur's Court (1921)
A Connecticut Yankee in King Arthur's Court (1889), Mark Twain	A Connecticut Yankee (1931)
A Connecticut Yankee in King Arthur's Court (1889), Mark Twain	A Connecticut Yankee in King Arthur's Court (1949)
A Connecticut Yankee in King Arthur's Court (1889), Mark Twain	Un español en la corte del rey Arturo (1964)
A Connecticut Yankee in King Arthur's Court (1889), Mark Twain	A Connecticut Yankee in King Arthur's Court (1970)
A Connecticut Yankee in King Arthur's Court (1889), Mark Twain	Unidentified Flying Oddball (1979)
A Connecticut Yankee in King Arthur's Court (1889), Mark Twain	Novye priklyucheniya yanki pri dvore korolya Artura (Russian: Новые приключения янки при дворе короля Артура) (1988)
A Connecticut Yankee in King Arthur's Court (1889), Mark Twain	A Connecticut Yankee in King Arthur's Court (1989)
A Connecticut Yankee in King Arthur's Court (1889), Mark Twain	A Kid in King Arthur's Court (1995)
A Connecticut Yankee in King Arthur's Court (1889), Mark Twain	A Young Connecticut Yankee in King Arthur's Court (1995)
A Connecticut Yankee in King Arthur's Court (1889), Mark Twain	A Kid in Aladdin's Palace (1998)
A Connecticut Yankee in King Arthur's Court (1889), Mark Twain	A Knight in Camelot (1998)
Conni (1992–2023) (series), Liane Schneider and Julia Boehme	Conni and the Cat (German: Meine Freundin Conni – Geheimnis um Kater Mau) (2020)
Conni & Co. (2005–2021) (series), Julia Boehme, Dagmar Hoßfeld and Karoline Sander	Conni & Co. (2016)
Conni & Co. (2005–2021) (series), Julia Boehme, Dagmar Hoßfeld and Karoline Sander	Conni & Co. 2 – Das Geheimnis des T-Rex (2017)
Coraline (2002), Neil Gaiman	Coraline (2009)
The Count of Monte Cristo (French: Le comte de Monte Cristo) (1844–1846), Alexandre Dumas, père	The Count of Monte Cristo (1913)
The Count of Monte Cristo (French: Le comte de Monte Cristo) (1844–1846), Alexandre Dumas, père	A Modern Monte Cristo (1917)
The Count of Monte Cristo (French: Le comte de Monte Cristo) (1844–1846), Alexandre Dumas, père	Monte Cristo (1922)
The Count of Monte Cristo (French: Le comte de Monte Cristo) (1844–1846), Alexandre Dumas, père	Monte Cristo (1929)
The Count of Monte Cristo (French: Le comte de Monte Cristo) (1844–1846), Alexandre Dumas, père	Count Monte Christopher (Korean: 암굴왕; MR: Amgurwang) (1932)
The Count of Monte Cristo (French: Le comte de Monte Cristo) (1844–1846), Alexandre Dumas, père	The Count of Monte Cristo (1934)
The Count of Monte Cristo (French: Le comte de Monte Cristo) (1844–1846), Alexandre Dumas, père	The Son of Monte Cristo (1940)
The Count of Monte Cristo (French: Le comte de Monte Cristo) (1844–1846), Alexandre Dumas, père	The Count of Monte Cristo (Spanish: El Conde de Montecristo) (1942)
The Count of Monte Cristo (French: Le comte de Monte Cristo) (1844–1846), Alexandre Dumas, père	The Count of Monte Cristo (1943)
The Count of Monte Cristo (French: Le comte de Monte Cristo) (1844–1846), Alexandre Dumas, père	The Wife of Monte Cristo (1946)
The Count of Monte Cristo (French: Le comte de Monte Cristo) (1844–1846), Alexandre Dumas, père	The Return of Monte Cristo (1946)
The Count of Monte Cristo (French: Le comte de Monte Cristo) (1844–1846), Alexandre Dumas, père	The Secret of Monte Cristo (French: Le Secret de Monte-Cristo) (1948)
The Count of Monte Cristo (French: Le comte de Monte Cristo) (1844–1846), Alexandre Dumas, père	Treasure of Monte Cristo (1949)
The Count of Monte Cristo (French: Le comte de Monte Cristo) (1844–1846), Alexandre Dumas, père	Prince of Revenge (Arabic: أمير الانتقام, romanized: Amir el-Inteqam) (1950)
The Count of Monte Cristo (French: Le comte de Monte Cristo) (1844–1846), Alexandre Dumas, père	The Sword of Monte Cristo (1951)
The Count of Monte Cristo (French: Le comte de Monte Cristo) (1844–1846), Alexandre Dumas, père	Sword of Venus (1953)
The Count of Monte Cristo (French: Le comte de Monte Cristo) (1844–1846), Alexandre Dumas, père	The Count of Monte Cristo (1953)
The Count of Monte Cristo (French: Le comte de Monte Cristo) (1844–1846), Alexandre Dumas, père	The Count of Monte Cristo (1954)
The Count of Monte Cristo (French: Le comte de Monte Cristo) (1844–1846), Alexandre Dumas, père	The Viscount of Monte Cristo (Spanish: El Vizconde de Montecristo) (1954)
The Count of Monte Cristo (French: Le comte de Monte Cristo) (1844–1846), Alexandre Dumas, père	Vanji Kottai Valipan (Tamil: வஞ்சிக்கோட்டை வாலிபன்) (1958)
The Count of Monte Cristo (French: Le comte de Monte Cristo) (1844–1846), Alexandre Dumas, père	Raj Tilak (Hindi: राज तिलक) (1958)
The Count of Monte Cristo (French: Le comte de Monte Cristo) (1844–1846), Alexandre Dumas, père	The Count of Monte Cristo (1961)
The Count of Monte Cristo (French: Le comte de Monte Cristo) (1844–1846), Alexandre Dumas, père	The Treasure of Monte Cristo (1961)
The Count of Monte Cristo (French: Le comte de Monte Cristo) (1844–1846), Alexandre Dumas, père	The Return of Monte Cristo (French: Sous le signe de Monte-Cristo) (1968)
The Count of Monte Cristo (French: Le comte de Monte Cristo) (1844–1846), Alexandre Dumas, père	The Count of Monte Cristo (1973)
The Count of Monte Cristo (French: Le comte de Monte Cristo) (1844–1846), Alexandre Dumas, père	The Count of Monte Cristo (1975)
The Count of Monte Cristo (French: Le comte de Monte Cristo) (1844–1846), Alexandre Dumas, père	Padayottam (Malayalam: പടയോട്ടം) (1982)
The Count of Monte Cristo (French: Le comte de Monte Cristo) (1844–1846), Alexandre Dumas, père	Veta (Telugu: వేట) (1986)
The Count of Monte Cristo (French: Le comte de Monte Cristo) (1844–1846), Alexandre Dumas, père	The Prisoner of Château d'If (Russian: Узник замка Иф) (1988)
The Count of Monte Cristo (French: Le comte de Monte Cristo) (1844–1846), Alexandre Dumas, père	The Count of Monte-Cristo (1992)
The Count of Monte Cristo (French: Le comte de Monte Cristo) (1844–1846), Alexandre Dumas, père	The Count of Monte Cristo (1997)
The Count of Monte Cristo (French: Le comte de Monte Cristo) (1844–1846), Alexandre Dumas, père	The Count of Monte Cristo (2002)
The Count of Monte Cristo (French: Le comte de Monte Cristo) (1844–1846), Alexandre Dumas, père	The Count of Monte Cristo (2024)
Curious George (1941–1966, 1984–1988) (series), H. A. Rey and Margret Rey	Curious George (2006)
Curious George (1941–1966, 1984–1988) (series), H. A. Rey and Margret Rey	Curious George 2: Follow That Monkey! (2010)
Curious George (1941–1966, 1984–1988) (series), H. A. Rey and Margret Rey	Curious George 3: Back to the Jungle (2015)
Curious George (1941–1966, 1984–1988) (series), H. A. Rey and Margret Rey	Curious George: Royal Monkey (2019)
Curious George (1941–1966, 1984–1988) (series), H. A. Rey and Margret Rey	Curious George: Go West, Go Wild! (2020)
Curious George (1941–1966, 1984–1988) (series), H. A. Rey and Margret Rey	Curious George: Cape Ahoy (2021)

== D ==
Children's book(s)	Film adaptation(s)
Danny, the Champion of the World (1975), Roald Dahl	Danny, the Champion of the World (1989)
The Darkest Minds (2012), Alexandra Bracken	The Darkest Minds (2018)
A Day with Wilbur Robinson (1990), William Joyce	Meet the Robinsons (2007)
The Dark Is Rising Sequence (1965–1977) (series), Susan Cooper	The Seeker (2007)
David Copperfield (serialised 1849–1850, published as a book 1850), Charles Dickens	David Copperfield (1911)
David Copperfield (serialised 1849–1850, published as a book 1850), Charles Dickens	David Copperfield (1913)
David Copperfield (serialised 1849–1850, published as a book 1850), Charles Dickens	David Copperfield (1922)
David Copperfield (serialised 1849–1850, published as a book 1850), Charles Dickens	David Copperfield (1935)
David Copperfield (serialised 1849–1850, published as a book 1850), Charles Dickens	David Copperfield (1969)
David Copperfield (serialised 1849–1850, published as a book 1850), Charles Dickens	David Copperfield (1983)
David Copperfield (serialised 1849–1850, published as a book 1850), Charles Dickens	David Copperfield (1993)
David Copperfield (serialised 1849–1850, published as a book 1850), Charles Dickens	David Copperfield (1999)
David Copperfield (serialised 1849–1850, published as a book 1850), Charles Dickens	David Copperfield (2000)
David Copperfield (serialised 1849–1850, published as a book 1850), Charles Dickens	The Personal History of David Copperfield (2019)
The Devil's Arithmetic (1988), Jane Yolen	The Devil's Arithmetic (1999)
Diary of a Wimpy Kid (2007–present) (series) (Note: Works adapted from the series in chronological order: Diary of a Wimpy Kid (2007), Rodrick Rules (2008), Dog Days (2009), Cabin Fever (2011) and The Long Haul (2014) respectively.), Jeff Kinney	Diary of a Wimpy Kid (2010)
Diary of a Wimpy Kid (2007–present) (series), Jeff Kinney	Diary of a Wimpy Kid: Rodrick Rules (2011)
Diary of a Wimpy Kid (2007–present) (series), Jeff Kinney	Diary of a Wimpy Kid: Dog Days (2012)
Diary of a Wimpy Kid (2007–present) (series), Jeff Kinney	Diary of a Wimpy Kid: The Long Haul (2017)
Diary of a Wimpy Kid (2007–present) (series), Jeff Kinney	Diary of a Wimpy Kid (2021)
Diary of a Wimpy Kid (2007–present) (series), Jeff Kinney	Diary of a Wimpy Kid: Rodrick Rules (2022)
Diary of a Wimpy Kid (2007–present) (series), Jeff Kinney	Diary of a Wimpy Kid Christmas: Cabin Fever (2023)
Divergent (2011–2013) (series) (Note: Works adapted from the series in chronological order: Divergent (2011), Insurgent (2012) and Allegiant (2013).), Veronica Roth	Divergent (2014)
Divergent (2011–2013) (series), Veronica Roth	The Divergent Series: Insurgent (2015)
Divergent (2011–2013) (series), Veronica Roth	The Divergent Series: Allegiant (2016)
Doctor Aybolit (Russian: Доктор Айболит, Doktor Aibolit) (1925), Korney Chukovsky	Doctor Aybolit (1938)
Doctor Aybolit (Russian: Доктор Айболит, Doktor Aibolit) (1925), Korney Chukovsky	Aybolit-66 (Russian: Айболит-66) (1966)
Doctor Dolittle (1920–1934) (series) (Note: Plot of the 1967 film adapted from three related works in order: The Story of Doctor Dolittle (1920), The Voyages of Doctor Dolittle (1922) and Doctor Dolittle's Circus (1924) respectively.), Hugh Lofting	Doctor Dolittle (1967)
Doctor Dolittle (1920–1934) (series), Hugh Lofting	Dr. Dolittle (1998)
Doctor Dolittle (1920–1934) (series), Hugh Lofting	Dr. Dolittle 2 (2001)
Doctor Dolittle (1920–1934) (series), Hugh Lofting	Dr. Dolittle 3 (2006)
Doctor Dolittle (1920–1934) (series), Hugh Lofting	Dr. Dolittle: Tail to the Chief (2008)
Doctor Dolittle (1920–1934) (series), Hugh Lofting	Dr. Dolittle: Million Dollar Mutts (2009)
Doctor Dolittle (1920–1934) (series), Hugh Lofting	Dolittle (2020)
Dog Man (2015), Dav Pilkey	Dog Man (2025)
Don Quixote (Note: Full title: The Ingenious Gentleman Don Quixote of La Mancha (Spanish: El ingenioso hidalgo don Quixote de la Mancha)) (1605–1615), Miguel de Cervantes	Don Quixote (1908)
Don Quixote (1605–1615), Miguel de Cervantes	Don Quixote (French: Don Quichotte) (1908)
Don Quixote (1605–1615), Miguel de Cervantes	Don Quixote (1915)
Don Quixote (1605–1615), Miguel de Cervantes	The Dream of Don Quixote (Italian: Il sogno di don Chisciotte) (1915)
Don Quixote (1605–1615), Miguel de Cervantes	Don Quixote (1923)
Don Quixote (1605–1615), Miguel de Cervantes	Don Quixote (1926)
Don Quixote (1605–1615), Miguel de Cervantes	Don Quixote (1933)
Don Quixote (1605–1615), Miguel de Cervantes	Don Quixote (1933; French)
Don Quixote (1605–1615), Miguel de Cervantes	Don Quixote (Spanish: Don Quijote de la Mancha) (1947)
Don Quixote (1605–1615), Miguel de Cervantes	The Curious Impertinent (Spanish: El curioso impertinente) (1953)
Don Quixote (1605–1615), Miguel de Cervantes	Don Quixote (1955–1969) (Note: Unfinished film.)
Don Quixote (1605–1615), Miguel de Cervantes	Don Quixote (Russian: Дон Кихот, Don Kikhot) (1957)
Don Quixote (1605–1615), Miguel de Cervantes	A Devil Under the Pillow (Spanish: Un diablo bajo la almohada, Italian: Calda e... infedele) (1968)
Don Quixote (1605–1615), Miguel de Cervantes	Don Chisciotte and Sancio Panza (Italian: Don Chisciotte e Sancio Panza) (1968)
Don Quixote (1605–1615), Miguel de Cervantes	Man of La Mancha (1972)
Don Quixote (1605–1615), Miguel de Cervantes	Don Quijote cabalga de nuevo (1973)
Don Quixote (1605–1615), Miguel de Cervantes	Don Quixote (1973)
Don Quixote (1605–1615), Miguel de Cervantes	The Amorous Adventures of Don Quixote and Sancho Panza (1976)
Don Quixote (1605–1615), Miguel de Cervantes	Don Quixote (Italian: Don Chisciotte) (1983)
Don Quixote (1605–1615), Miguel de Cervantes	Don Quixote of La Mancha (1987)
Don Quixote (1605–1615), Miguel de Cervantes	Don Quixote Returns (Russian: Дон Кихот возвращается) (1997)
Don Quixote (1605–1615), Miguel de Cervantes	Don Quixote (2000)
Don Quixote (1605–1615), Miguel de Cervantes	Don Quixote, Knight Errant (Spanish: El caballero Don Quijote) (2002)
Don Quixote (1605–1615), Miguel de Cervantes	Honor of the Knights (Catalan: Honor de cavalleria) (2006)
Don Quixote (1605–1615), Miguel de Cervantes	Donkey Xote (2007)
Don Quixote (1605–1615), Miguel de Cervantes	Don Quichote: Gib niemals auf! (2008)
Don Quixote (1605–1615), Miguel de Cervantes	Don Quixote (2010)
Don Quixote (1605–1615), Miguel de Cervantes	Don Quixote (2015)
Don Quixote (1605–1615), Miguel de Cervantes	The Man Who Killed Don Quixote (2018)
Don Quixote (1605–1615), Miguel de Cervantes	The True Don Quixote (2019)
Dot and the Kangaroo (1899), Ethel Pedley and Frank P. Mahony	Dot and the Kangaroo (1977)
Dot and the Kangaroo (1899), Ethel Pedley and Frank P. Mahony	Around the World with Dot (1981)
Dot and the Kangaroo (1899), Ethel Pedley and Frank P. Mahony	Dot and the Bunny (1983)
Dot and the Kangaroo (1899), Ethel Pedley and Frank P. Mahony	Dot and the Koala (1984)
Dot and the Kangaroo (1899), Ethel Pedley and Frank P. Mahony	Dot and Keeto (1985)
Dot and the Kangaroo (1899), Ethel Pedley and Frank P. Mahony	Dot and the Whale (1986)
Dot and the Kangaroo (1899), Ethel Pedley and Frank P. Mahony	Dot and the Smugglers (1987)
Dot and the Kangaroo (1899), Ethel Pedley and Frank P. Mahony	Dot Goes to Hollywood (1987)
Dot and the Kangaroo (1899), Ethel Pedley and Frank P. Mahony	Dot in Space (1994)
Dragon Rider (1997), Cornelia Funke	Dragon Rider (2020)
The Duff (2010), Kody Keplinger	The DUFF (2015)
Dumbo, the Flying Elephant (1939), Helen Aberson and Harold Pearl	Dumbo (1941)
Dumbo, the Flying Elephant (1939), Helen Aberson and Harold Pearl	Dumbo (2019)

== E ==
Children's book(s)	Film adaptation(s)
The Eagle of the Ninth (1954), Rosemary Sutcliff	The Eagle (2011)
Ella Enchanted (1997), Gail Carson Levine	Ella Enchanted (2004)
Eloise (1955–2002) (series), Kay Thompson and Hilary Knight	Eloise at the Plaza (2003)
Eloise (1955–2002) (series), Kay Thompson and Hilary Knight	Eloise at Christmastime (2003)
Emil and the Detectives (German: Emil und die Detektive) (1929), Erich Kästner	Emil and the Detectives (1931)
Emil and the Detectives (German: Emil und die Detektive) (1929), Erich Kästner	Emil and the Detectives (1935)
Emil and the Detectives (German: Emil und die Detektive) (1929), Erich Kästner	Emil and the Detectives (1954)
Emil and the Detectives (German: Emil und die Detektive) (1929), Erich Kästner	Emil and the Detectives (1964)
Emil and the Detectives (German: Emil und die Detektive) (1929), Erich Kästner	Emil and the Detectives (2001)
"The Emperor's New Clothes" (Danish: Kejserens nye klæder), from Fairy Tales Told for Children. First Collection. Third Booklet. 1837. (Danish: Eventyr, fortalte for Børn. Første Samling. Tredie Hefte. 1837.) (1837), Hans Christian Andersen	The Emperor's New Clothes (Carevo novo ruho) (1961)
"The Emperor's New Clothes" (Danish: Kejserens nye klæder), from Fairy Tales Told for Children. First Collection. Third Booklet. 1837. (Danish: Eventyr, fortalte for Børn. Første Samling. Tredie Hefte. 1837.) (1837), Hans Christian Andersen	The Enchanted World of Danny Kaye: The Emperor's New Clothes (1972) (TV)
"The Emperor's New Clothes" (Danish: Kejserens nye klæder), from Fairy Tales Told for Children. First Collection. Third Booklet. 1837. (Danish: Eventyr, fortalte for Børn. Første Samling. Tredie Hefte. 1837.) (1837), Hans Christian Andersen	The Emperor's New Clothes (1987)
"The Emperor's New Clothes" (Danish: Kejserens nye klæder), from Fairy Tales Told for Children. First Collection. Third Booklet. 1837. (Danish: Eventyr, fortalte for Børn. Første Samling. Tredie Hefte. 1837.) (1837), Hans Christian Andersen	The Emperor's New Clothes (1991)
"The Emperor's New Clothes" (Danish: Kejserens nye klæder), from Fairy Tales Told for Children. First Collection. Third Booklet. 1837. (Danish: Eventyr, fortalte for Børn. Første Samling. Tredie Hefte. 1837.) (1837), Hans Christian Andersen	Muppet Classic Theater (1994)
Ender's Game (1985), Orson Scott Card	Ender's Game (2013)
Eragon (2003), Christopher Paolini	Eragon (2006)
Escape from Mr. Lemoncello's Library (2013), Chris Grabenstein	Escape from Mr. Lemoncello's Library (2017)
Escape to Witch Mountain (1968), Alexander Key	Escape to Witch Mountain (1975)
Escape to Witch Mountain (1968), Alexander Key	Return from Witch Mountain (1978)
Escape to Witch Mountain (1968), Alexander Key	Beyond Witch Mountain (1982)
Escape to Witch Mountain (1968), Alexander Key	Escape to Witch Mountain (1995)
Escape to Witch Mountain (1968), Alexander Key	Race to Witch Mountain (2009)
Ethel & Ernest (1998), Raymond Briggs	Ethel & Ernest (2016)
Every Day (2012), David Levithan	Every Day (2018)
Everything Everything (2015), Nicola Yoon	Everything Everything (2017)

== F ==
Children's book(s)	Film adaptation(s)
The Face on the Milk Carton (1990), Caroline B. Cooney	The Face on the Milk Carton (1995)
Fallen (2009), Lauren Kate	Fallen (2016)
Fantastic Beasts and Where to Find Them (2001), J. K. Rowling	Fantastic Beasts and Where to Find Them (2016) (Note: Fantastic Beasts)
Fantastic Beasts and Where to Find Them (2001), J. K. Rowling	Fantastic Beasts: The Crimes of Grindelwald (2018)
Fantastic Beasts and Where to Find Them (2001), J. K. Rowling	Fantastic Beasts: The Secrets of Dumbledore (2022)
Fat Kid Rules the World (2003), K. L. Going	Fat Kid Rules the World (2012)
Father Christmas (1973), Raymond Briggs	Father Christmas (1991)
Fantastic Mr Fox (1970), Roald Dahl	Fantastic Mr. Fox (2009)
The Fault in Our Stars (2012), John Green	The Fault in Our Stars (2014)
Flipped (2001), Wendelin Van Draanen	Flipped (2010)
Florian: The Emperor's Stallion (German: Florian: Das Pferd des Kaisers) (1933), Felix Salten	Florian (1940)
Four Children and It (2012), Jacqueline Wilson	Four Kids and It (2020)
The Fox and the Hound (1967), Daniel P. Mannix	The Fox and the Hound (1981)
The Fox and the Hound (1967), Daniel P. Mannix	The Fox and the Hound 2 (2006)
Franklin the Turtle (1986—2002) (series), Paulette Bourgeois and Brenda Clark	Franklin and the Green Knight (2000)
Franklin the Turtle (1986—2002) (series), Paulette Bourgeois and Brenda Clark	Franklin's Magic Christmas (2001)
Franklin the Turtle (1986—2002) (series), Paulette Bourgeois and Brenda Clark	Back to School with Franklin (2003)
Franklin the Turtle (1986—2002) (series), Paulette Bourgeois and Brenda Clark	Franklin and the Turtle Lake Treasure (2006)
Frække Frida og de frygtløse spioner (1988), Lykke Nielsen	Frække Frida og de frygtløse spioner (1994)
Freak the Mighty (1993), Rodman Philbrick	The Mighty (1998)
Freaky Friday (1972), Mary Rodgers	Freaky Friday (1976)
Freaky Friday (1972), Mary Rodgers	Freaky Friday (1995)
Freaky Friday (1972), Mary Rodgers	Freaky Friday (2003)
Freaky Friday (1972), Mary Rodgers	Freaky Friday (2018)
Freaky Friday (1972), Mary Rodgers	Freakier Friday (2025) (Note: Sequel to the 2003 film.)
"The Frog Prince; or, Iron Henry" (German: Der Froschkönig oder der eiserne Heinrich), from Grimm's Fairy Tales (German: Kinder- und Hausmärchen, Children's and Household Tales) (1812), Brothers Grimm	The Frog Prince (1971)
"The Frog Prince; or, Iron Henry" (German: Der Froschkönig oder der eiserne Heinrich), from Grimm's Fairy Tales (German: Kinder- und Hausmärchen, Children's and Household Tales) (1812), Brothers Grimm	The Frog Prince (1986)
"The Frog Prince; or, Iron Henry" (German: Der Froschkönig oder der eiserne Heinrich), from Grimm's Fairy Tales (German: Kinder- und Hausmärchen, Children's and Household Tales) (1812), Brothers Grimm	Prince Charming (2001)
From the Mixed-Up Files of Mrs. Basil E. Frankweiler (1967), E. L. Konigsburg	From the Mixed-Up Files of Mrs. Basil E. Frankweiler (1973)
From the Mixed-Up Files of Mrs. Basil E. Frankweiler (1967), E. L. Konigsburg	From the Mixed-Up Files of Mrs. Basil E. Frankweiler (1995)

== G ==
Children's book(s)	Film adaptation(s)
Gangsta Granny (2011), David Walliams	Gangsta Granny (2013)
The Ghosts (1969), Antonia Barber	The Amazing Mr Blunden (1972)
The Giver (1993), Lois Lowry	The Giver (2014)
The Golden Key, or the Adventures of Buratino (Russian: Золотой ключик, или Приключения Буратино) (1936), Aleksey Nikolayevich Tolstoy	The Golden Key (Russian: Золотой ключик) (1939)
The Golden Key, or the Adventures of Buratino (Russian: Золотой ключик, или Приключения Буратино) (1936), Aleksey Nikolayevich Tolstoy	The Adventures of Buratino (1959)
The Golden Key, or the Adventures of Buratino (Russian: Золотой ключик, или Приключения Буратино) (1936), Aleksey Nikolayevich Tolstoy	The Adventures of Buratino (1975)
The Golden Key, or the Adventures of Buratino (Russian: Золотой ключик, или Приключения Буратино) (1936), Aleksey Nikolayevich Tolstoy	The New Adventures of Buratino (Russian: Новейшие приключения Буратино) (1997)
The Golden Key, or the Adventures of Buratino (Russian: Золотой ключик, или Приключения Буратино) (1936), Aleksey Nikolayevich Tolstoy	Buratino, Son of Pinocchio (2009)
The Golden Key, or the Adventures of Buratino (Russian: Золотой ключик, или Приключения Буратино) (1936), Aleksey Nikolayevich Tolstoy	The Return of Buratino (Italian: Возвращение Буратино) (2013)
The Golden Key, or the Adventures of Buratino (Russian: Золотой ключик, или Приключения Буратино) (1936), Aleksey Nikolayevich Tolstoy	Buratino (Russian: Буратино) (2026)
Gnomes (Dutch: Leven en werken van de Kabouter) (1977), Wil Huygen and Rien Poortvliet	Gnomes (1980)
The Gnomobile (1937), Upton Sinclair	The Gnome-Mobile (1967)
"The Golden Bird" (German: Der goldene Vogel), from Grimms' Fairy Tales (German: Kinder- und Haus-Märchen. Bd. 1., Children's and Household Tales Volume 1) (1812), Brothers Grimm	Grimm Douwa: Kin no Tori (Japanese: グリム童話 金の鳥) (1987)
The Golden Doors (1957), Edward Fenton	Escapade in Florence (1962)
Gon, the Little Fox (Japanese: ごん狐, romanized: Gongitsune) (1932), Nankichi Niimi	Gon, the Little Fox (Japanese: ごんぎつね, romanized: Gongitsune) (1985)
Goosebumps (1992—1997) (series), R.L. Stine	Goosebumps (2015)
Goosebumps (1992—1997) (series), R.L. Stine	Goosebumps 2: Haunted Halloween (2018)
Great Expectations (1861), (Note: Serialised 1860–1861; published as a book 1861.) Charles Dickens	Great Expectations (1917)
Great Expectations (1861), Charles Dickens	Great Expectations (1922)
Great Expectations (1861), Charles Dickens	Great Expectations (1934)
Great Expectations (1861), Charles Dickens	Great Expectations (1946)
Great Expectations (1861), Charles Dickens	Great Expectations (1974)
Great Expectations (1861), Charles Dickens	Great Expectations (1983)
Great Expectations (1861), Charles Dickens	Great Expectations (1998)
Great Expectations (1861), Charles Dickens	Great Expectations (1999)
Great Expectations (1861), Charles Dickens	Great Expectations (2012)
Great Expectations (1861), Charles Dickens	Fitoor (Hindi: फितूर) (2016)
Green Grass of Wyoming (1946), Mary O'Hara	Green Grass of Wyoming (1948)
De Griezelbus (1991–2006) (series), Paul van Loon	Gruesome School Trip (2005)
The Guardians of Childhood (2011—present) (series), William Joyce	Rise of the Guardians (2012)
Guardians of Ga'Hoole (2003—2008, 2010) (series), Kathryn Lasky	Legend of the Guardians: The Owls of Ga'Hoole (2010)
Gulliver's Travels (1726), Jonathan Swift	Gulliver's Travels (German: Gullivers Reisen) (1924)
Gulliver's Travels (1726), Jonathan Swift	The New Gulliver (1935)
Gulliver's Travels (1726), Jonathan Swift	Gulliver's Travels (1939)
Gulliver's Travels (1726), Jonathan Swift	The 3 Worlds of Gulliver (1960)
Gulliver's Travels (1726), Jonathan Swift	Gulliver's Travels Beyond the Moon (1965)
Gulliver's Travels (1726), Jonathan Swift	Gulliver in the Country of Dwarfs (Hungarian: Gulliver a törpék országában) (1974)
Gulliver's Travels (1726), Jonathan Swift	Gulliver's Travels (1977)
Gulliver's Travels (1726), Jonathan Swift	Gulliver's Travels (1979)
Gulliver's Travels (1726), Jonathan Swift	Gulliver in the Country of Giants (Hungarian: Gulliver az óriások országában) (1980)
Gulliver's Travels (1726), Jonathan Swift	Gulliver's Travels (Spanish: Los viajes de Gulliver) (1983)
Gulliver's Travels (1726), Jonathan Swift	Gulliver's Travels (1996)
Gulliver's Travels (1726), Jonathan Swift	Crayola Kids Adventures: Tales of Gulliver's Travels (1997)
Gulliver's Travels (1726), Jonathan Swift	Jajantaram Mamantaram (2003)
Gulliver's Travels (1726), Jonathan Swift	Gulliver's Travel (2005)
Gulliver's Travels (1726), Jonathan Swift	Gulliver's Travels (2010)
Guns in the Heather (1963), Lockhart Amerman	Guns in the Heather (1969)

== H ==
Children's book(s)	Film adaptation(s)
Hans Brinker, or The Silver Skates (1865), Mary Mapes Dodge and Alice Carsey	Hans Brinker, or The Silver Skates (1958)
Hans Brinker, or The Silver Skates (1865), Mary Mapes Dodge and Alice Carsey	Hans Brinker, or The Silver Skates (1962)
Hans Brinker, or The Silver Skates (1865), Mary Mapes Dodge and Alice Carsey	Hans Brinker, or The Silver Skates (1969)
Hans Brinker, or The Silver Skates (1865), Mary Mapes Dodge and Alice Carsey	Hans and the Silver Skates (1991)
Hans Brinker, or The Silver Skates (1865), Mary Mapes Dodge and Alice Carsey	Brink! (1998)
Hans Brinker, or The Silver Skates (1865), Mary Mapes Dodge and Alice Carsey	The Silver Skates (2020)
"Hansel and Gretel" (German: Hänsel und Gretel), from Grimms' Fairy Tales (German: Kinder- und Hausmärchen, Children's and Household Tales) (1812), Brothers Grimm	Hansel and Gretel (1954) (Note: Directed by Fritz Genschow.)
"Hansel and Gretel" (German: Hänsel und Gretel), from Grimms' Fairy Tales (German: Kinder- und Hausmärchen, Children's and Household Tales) (1812), Brothers Grimm	Hansel and Gretel (1954) (Note: Directed by Walter Janssen.)
"Hansel and Gretel" (German: Hänsel und Gretel), from Grimms' Fairy Tales (German: Kinder- und Hausmärchen, Children's and Household Tales) (1812), Brothers Grimm	Hansel and Gretel: An Opera Fantasy (1954)
"Hansel and Gretel" (German: Hänsel und Gretel), from Grimms' Fairy Tales (German: Kinder- und Hausmärchen, Children's and Household Tales) (1812), Brothers Grimm	Hansel and Gretel (1983)
"Hansel and Gretel" (German: Hänsel und Gretel), from Grimms' Fairy Tales (German: Kinder- und Hausmärchen, Children's and Household Tales) (1812), Brothers Grimm	Hansel and Gretel (1987)
"Hansel and Gretel" (German: Hänsel und Gretel), from Grimms' Fairy Tales (German: Kinder- und Hausmärchen, Children's and Household Tales) (1812), Brothers Grimm	Hansel and Gretel (1997)
"Hansel and Gretel" (German: Hänsel und Gretel), from Grimms' Fairy Tales (German: Kinder- und Hausmärchen, Children's and Household Tales) (1812), Brothers Grimm	Hansel and Gretel (2002)
"Hansel and Gretel" (German: Hänsel und Gretel), from Grimms' Fairy Tales (German: Kinder- und Hausmärchen, Children's and Household Tales) (1812), Brothers Grimm	Witchslayer Gretl (2012)
"Hansel and Gretel" (German: Hänsel und Gretel), from Grimms' Fairy Tales (German: Kinder- und Hausmärchen, Children's and Household Tales) (1812), Brothers Grimm	Hansel & Gretel (2013)
"Hansel and Gretel" (German: Hänsel und Gretel), from Grimms' Fairy Tales (German: Kinder- und Hausmärchen, Children's and Household Tales) (1812), Brothers Grimm	Hansel & Gretel: Warriors of Witchcraft (2013)
"Hansel and Gretel" (German: Hänsel und Gretel), from Grimms' Fairy Tales (German: Kinder- und Hausmärchen, Children's and Household Tales) (1812), Brothers Grimm	Hansel & Gretel: Witch Hunters (2013)
"Hansel and Gretel" (German: Hänsel und Gretel), from Grimms' Fairy Tales (German: Kinder- und Hausmärchen, Children's and Household Tales) (1812), Brothers Grimm	Hansel vs. Gretel (2015)
"Hansel and Gretel" (German: Hänsel und Gretel), from Grimms' Fairy Tales (German: Kinder- und Hausmärchen, Children's and Household Tales) (1812), Brothers Grimm	Gretel & Hansel (2020)
"Hansel and Gretel" (German: Hänsel und Gretel), from Grimms' Fairy Tales (German: Kinder- und Hausmärchen, Children's and Household Tales) (1812), Brothers Grimm	Secret Magic Control Agency (2021)
Harold and the Purple Crayon (1955), Crockett Johnson	Harold and the Purple Crayon (2024)
Harriet the Spy (1964), Louise Fitzhugh	Harriet the Spy (1996)
Harriet the Spy (1964), Louise Fitzhugh	Harriet the Spy: Blog Wars (2010)
Harry Potter (1997–2007) (series) (Note: Works adapted from the series in chronological order: Philosopher's Stone (1997), Chamber of Secrets (1998), Prisoner of Azkaban (1999), Goblet of Fire (2000), Order of the Phoenix (2003), Half-Blood Prince (2005) and Deathly Hallows (2007).), J. K. Rowling	Harry Potter and the Philosopher's Stone (2001) (Note: Harry Potter (film series))
Harry Potter (1997–2007) (series), J. K. Rowling	Harry Potter and the Chamber of Secrets (2002)
Harry Potter (1997–2007) (series), J. K. Rowling	Harry Potter and the Prisoner of Azkaban (2004)
Harry Potter (1997–2007) (series), J. K. Rowling	Harry Potter and the Goblet of Fire (2005)
Harry Potter (1997–2007) (series), J. K. Rowling	Harry Potter and the Order of the Phoenix (2007)
Harry Potter (1997–2007) (series), J. K. Rowling	Harry Potter and the Half-Blood Prince (2009)
Harry Potter (1997–2007) (series), J. K. Rowling	Harry Potter and the Deathly Hallows – Part 1 (2010)
Harry Potter (1997–2007) (series), J. K. Rowling	Harry Potter and the Deathly Hallows – Part 2 (2011)
Hatchet (1987), Gary Paulsen	A Cry in the Wild (1990)
Hatchet (1987), Gary Paulsen	White Wolves: A Cry in the Wild II (1993)
Hatchet (1987), Gary Paulsen	White Wolves II: Legend of the Wild (1996)
Hatchet (1987), Gary Paulsen	White Wolves III: Cry of the White Wolf (2000)
Heidi (1880–81), Johanna Spyri	Heidi (1937)
Heidi (1880–81), Johanna Spyri	Heidi (1952)
Heidi (1880–81), Johanna Spyri	Heidi and Peter (1955)
Heidi (1880–81), Johanna Spyri	A Gift for Heidi (1958)
Heidi (1880–81), Johanna Spyri	Do Phool (Hindi: दो फूल) (1958)
Heidi (1880–81), Johanna Spyri	Heidi (1965)
Heidi (1880–81), Johanna Spyri	Heidi (1968)
Heidi (1880–81), Johanna Spyri	The New Adventures of Heidi (1978)
Heidi (1880–81), Johanna Spyri	Heidi in the Mountains (1979)
Heidi (1880–81), Johanna Spyri	Heidi's Song (1982)
Heidi (1880–81), Johanna Spyri	Courage Mountain (1990)
Heidi (1880–81), Johanna Spyri	Heidi (1995)
Heidi (1880–81), Johanna Spyri	Heidi (2001)
Heidi (1880–81), Johanna Spyri	Heidi (2005) (Note: Animated film directed by Alan Simpson.)
Heidi (1880–81), Johanna Spyri	Heidi (2005) (Note: Live action film directed by Paul Marcus.)
Heidi (1880–81), Johanna Spyri	Heidi 4 Paws (2008)
Heidi (1880–81), Johanna Spyri	Heidi (2015)
Heidi (1880–81), Johanna Spyri	Heidi: Queen of the Mountain (2017)
Heidi (1880–81), Johanna Spyri	Heidi (2024)
Heidi (1880–81), Johanna Spyri	Heidi: Rescue of the Lynx (2025)
Headhunters (2001), Jules Bass	Monte Carlo (2011)
Hector the Stowaway Dog (1958), Kenneth M. Dodson	The Ballad of Hector, the Stowaway Dog (1964)
Here Be Monsters! (2005), Alan Snow	The Boxtrolls (2014)
The Hobbit (1937), J. R. R. Tolkien	The Hobbit (1977)
The Hobbit (1937), J. R. R. Tolkien	The Hobbit (1985)
The Hobbit (1937), J. R. R. Tolkien	The Hobbit: An Unexpected Journey (2012) (Note: The Hobbit (film series))
The Hobbit (1937), J. R. R. Tolkien	The Hobbit: The Desolation of Smaug (2013)
The Hobbit (1937), J. R. R. Tolkien	The Hobbit: The Battle of the Five Armies (2014)
Holes (1998), Louis Sachar	Holes (2003)
Hoot (2002), Carl Hiaasen	Hoot (2006)
"Hop-o'-My-Thumb" (French: Le Petit Poucet), from Stories or Tales from Past Times, with Morals (French: Histoires ou contes du temps passé) (1697), Charles Perrault	Le Petit Poucet (1972)
"Hop-o'-My-Thumb" (French: Le Petit Poucet), from Stories or Tales from Past Times, with Morals (French: Histoires ou contes du temps passé) (1697), Charles Perrault	Le Petit Poucet (2001)
"Hop-o'-My-Thumb" (French: Le Petit Poucet), from Stories or Tales from Past Times, with Morals (French: Histoires ou contes du temps passé) (1697), Charles Perrault	Le Petit Poucet (2011)
Horrid Henry (1994–present) (series), Francesca Simon	Horrid Henry: The Movie (2011)
The Horsemasters (1957), Don Stanford	The Horsemasters (1961)
Horton Hears a Who! (1954), Dr. Seuss	Horton Hears a Who! (2008)
Hotel for Dogs (1971), Lois Duncan	Hotel for Dogs (2009)
The Hound of Florence (German: Der Hund von Florenz) (1923), Felix Salten	The Shaggy Dog (1959)
The Hound of Florence (German: Der Hund von Florenz) (1923), Felix Salten	The Shaggy D.A. (1976) (Note: First sequel to the 1959 film.)
The Hound of Florence (German: Der Hund von Florenz) (1923), Felix Salten	The Return of the Shaggy Dog (1987) (Note: Second sequel to the 1959 film.)
The Hound of Florence (German: Der Hund von Florenz) (1923), Felix Salten	The Shaggy Dog (1994)
The Hound of Florence (German: Der Hund von Florenz) (1923), Felix Salten	The Shaggy Dog (2006)
The House of Tomorrow (2010), Peter Bognanni	The House of Tomorrow (2017)
How I Live Now (2004), Meg Rosoff	How I Live Now (2013)
How My Private, Personal Journal Became a Bestseller (2004), Julia DeVillers	Read it and Weep (2006)
How the Grinch Stole Christmas! (1957), Dr. Seuss	How the Grinch Stole Christmas! (2000)
How the Grinch Stole Christmas! (1957), Dr. Seuss	The Grinch (2018)
How the Grinch Stole Christmas! (1957), Dr. Seuss	The Mean One (2022)
How to Eat Fried Worms (1973), Thomas Rockwell	How to Eat Fried Worms (2006)
How to Train Your Dragon (2003–2015) (series), Cressida Cowell	How to Train Your Dragon (2010)
How to Train Your Dragon (2003–2015) (series), Cressida Cowell	How to Train Your Dragon 2 (2014)
How to Train Your Dragon (2003–2015) (series), Cressida Cowell	How to Train Your Dragon: The Hidden World (2019)
How to Train Your Dragon (2003–2015) (series), Cressida Cowell	How to Train Your Dragon (2025) (Note: Live action remake of the 2010 animated film.)
Howl's Moving Castle (1986), Diana Wynne Jones	Howl's Moving Castle (2004)
The Hundred and One Dalmatians (1956), Dodie Smith	One Hundred and One Dalmatians (1961)
The Hundred and One Dalmatians (1956), Dodie Smith	101 Dalmatians (1996)
The Hundred and One Dalmatians (1956), Dodie Smith	102 Dalmatians (2000) (Note: Sequel to the 1996 live action film.)
The Hundred and One Dalmatians (1956), Dodie Smith	101 Dalmatians II: Patch's London Adventure (2003) (Note: Sequel to the 1961 animated film.)
The Hundred and One Dalmatians (1956), Dodie Smith	Cruella (2021)
A Hundred Million Francs (French: Le Cheval sans tête) (1955), Paul Berna	The Horse Without a Head (1963)
The Hunger Games (2008–2010, 2020–2025) (series) (Note: Works adapted from the series in chronological order: The Hunger Games (2008), Catching Fire (2009), Mockingjay (2010), The Ballad of Songbirds and Snakes (2020) and Sunrise on the Reaping (2025).), Suzanne Collins	The Hunger Games (2012)
The Hunger Games (2008–2010, 2020–2025) (series), Suzanne Collins	The Hunger Games: Catching Fire (2013)
The Hunger Games (2008–2010, 2020–2025) (series), Suzanne Collins	The Hunger Games: Mockingjay - Part 1 (2014)
The Hunger Games (2008–2010, 2020–2025) (series), Suzanne Collins	The Hunger Games: Mockingjay - Part 2 (2015)
The Hunger Games (2008–2010, 2020–2025) (series), Suzanne Collins	The Hunger Games: The Ballad of Songbirds & Snakes (2023)
The Hunger Games (2008–2010, 2020–2025) (series), Suzanne Collins	The Hunger Games: Sunrise on the Reaping (2026)
Hurry Home, Candy (1953), Meindert DeJong	Little Dog Lost (1963)

== I ==
Children's book(s)	Film adaptation(s)
I Am Number Four (2010), Pittacus Lore	I Am Number Four (2011)
I Capture the Castle (1948), Dodie Smith	I Capture the Castle (2003)
I Want a Dog (1987), Dayal Kaur Khalsa	I Want a Dog (2003)
If I Stay (2009), Gayle Forman	If I Stay (2014)
The Incredible Journey (1961), Sheila Burnford	The Incredible Journey (1963)
The Incredible Journey (1961), Sheila Burnford	Homeward Bound: The Incredible Journey (1993)
The Incredible Journey (1961), Sheila Burnford	Homeward Bound II: Lost in San Francisco (1996) (Note: Sequel to the 1993 film.)
The Indian in the Cupboard (1980), Lynne Reid Banks	The Indian in the Cupboard (1995)
Inkheart (2003), Cornelia Funke	Inkheart (2009)
The Invention of Hugo Cabret (2007), Brian Selznick	Hugo (2011)
The Iron Man (1968), Ted Hughes	The Iron Giant (1999)
Island of the Blue Dolphins (1960), Scott O'Dell	Island of the Blue Dolphins (1964)
The Island on Bird Street (1981), Uri Orlev	The Island on Bird Street (1997)
It's Kind of a Funny Story (2006), Ned Vizzini	It's Kind of a Funny Story (2010)

== J ==
Children's book(s)	Film adaptation(s)
Jacob Two Two Meets the Hooded Fang (1975), Mordecai Richler	Jacob Two-Two Meets the Hooded Fang (1978)
Jacob Two Two Meets the Hooded Fang (1975), Mordecai Richler	Jacob Two Two Meets the Hooded Fang (1999)
Jakobus Nimmersatt (1968), Boy Lornsen	Back to the Forest (Japanese: のどか森の動物大作戦, Nodoka Mori no Doubutsu Daisakusen) (1980)
James and the Giant Peach (1961), Roald Dahl	James and the Giant Peach (1976)
James and the Giant Peach (1961), Roald Dahl	James and the Giant Peach (1996)
Johnny Tremain (1944), Esther Forbes	Johnny Tremain (1957)
Journey to the Center of the Earth (French: Voyage au centre de la Terre) (1864), Jules Verne	Journey to the Center of the Earth (1959)
Journey to the Center of the Earth (French: Voyage au centre de la Terre) (1864), Jules Verne	A Journey to the Center of the Earth (1977)
Journey to the Center of the Earth (French: Voyage au centre de la Terre) (1864), Jules Verne	Where Time Began (Spanish: Viaje al centro de la Tierra) (1978)
Journey to the Center of the Earth (French: Voyage au centre de la Terre) (1864), Jules Verne	Journey to the Center of the Earth (1989)
Journey to the Center of the Earth (French: Voyage au centre de la Terre) (1864), Jules Verne	Journey to the Center of the Earth (1993)
Journey to the Center of the Earth (French: Voyage au centre de la Terre) (1864), Jules Verne	Journey to the Center of the Earth (1996)
Journey to the Center of the Earth (French: Voyage au centre de la Terre) (1864), Jules Verne	Journey to the Center of the Earth (2008; New Line Cinema)
Journey to the Center of the Earth (French: Voyage au centre de la Terre) (1864), Jules Verne	Journey to the Center of the Earth (2008; RHI Entertainment)
Journey to the Center of the Earth (French: Voyage au centre de la Terre) (1864), Jules Verne	Journey to the Center of the Earth (2008; The Asylum)
Judy Moody and Stink (2000–2010) (series), Megan McDonald	Judy Moody and the Not Bummer Summer (2011)
Jumanji (1981), Chris Van Allsburg	Jumanji (1995)
Jumanji (1981), Chris Van Allsburg	Jumanji: Welcome to the Jungle (2017)
Jumanji (1981), Chris Van Allsburg	Jumanji: The Next Level (2019)
Jumanji (1981), Chris Van Allsburg	Jumanji: Open World (2026)
The Jungle Book (1894–1895) (Note: Originally published as two separate volumes: The Jungle Book (1894) and The Second Jungle Book (1895).), Rudyard Kipling	Elephant Boy (1937)
The Jungle Book (1894–1895), Rudyard Kipling	Rudyard Kipling's Jungle Book (1942)
The Jungle Book (1894–1895), Rudyard Kipling	The Jungle Book (1967)
The Jungle Book (1894–1895), Rudyard Kipling	Adventures of Mowgli (1973) (Note: Originally released as a five-part series of 20-minute short films from 1967–1971.)
The Jungle Book (1894–1895), Rudyard Kipling	The Jungle Book (1992)
The Jungle Book (1894–1895), Rudyard Kipling	Rudyard Kipling's The Jungle Book (1994)
The Jungle Book (1894–1895), Rudyard Kipling	Jungle Book (1995)
The Jungle Book (1894–1895), Rudyard Kipling	The Second Jungle Book: Mowgli & Baloo (1997)
The Jungle Book (1894–1895), Rudyard Kipling	Jungle Book: Mowgli's Story (1998)
The Jungle Book (1894–1895), Rudyard Kipling	The Jungle Book: Search for the Lost Treasure (1998)
The Jungle Book (1894–1895), Rudyard Kipling	The Jungle Book 2 (2003)
The Jungle Book (1894–1895), Rudyard Kipling	Jungle Book: Rikki-Tikki-Tavi to the Rescue (2006)
The Jungle Book (1894–1895), Rudyard Kipling	The Jungle Book (2016)
The Jungle Book (1894–1895), Rudyard Kipling	Mowgli: Legend of the Jungle (2018)
Justin Morgan Had a Horse (1945), Marguerite Henry and Wesley Dennis	Justin Morgan Had a Horse (1972)

== K ==
Children's book(s)	Film adaptation(s)
Kaytek the Wizard (Polish: Kajtuś Czarodziej) (1933), Janusz Korczak	Kaytek the Wizard (2023)
Kidnapped (1886), Robert Louis Stevenson	Kidnapped (1917)
Kidnapped (1886), Robert Louis Stevenson	Kidnapped (1938)
Kidnapped (1886), Robert Louis Stevenson	Kidnapped (1960)
Kidnapped (1886), Robert Louis Stevenson	Kidnapped (1971) (Note: Conflated with the first half of another work Catriona (1893) by the same author.)
Kidnapped (1886), Robert Louis Stevenson	Kidnapped (1986)
Kidnapped (1886), Robert Louis Stevenson	Kidnapped (1995)
King Solomon's Mines (1885), Sir H. Rider Haggard	Allan Quatermain (1919)
King Solomon's Mines (1885), Sir H. Rider Haggard	King Solomon's Mines (1937)
King Solomon's Mines (1885), Sir H. Rider Haggard	King Solomon's Mines (1950)
King Solomon's Mines (1885), Sir H. Rider Haggard	Watusi (1959)
King Solomon's Mines (1885), Sir H. Rider Haggard	King Solomon's Treasure (1979)
King Solomon's Mines (1885), Sir H. Rider Haggard	King Solomon's Mines (1985)
King Solomon's Mines (1885), Sir H. Rider Haggard	Allan Quatermain and the Lost City of Gold (1986) (Note: Film adapted from the sequel novel Allan Quatermain (1887) by the same author.)
King Solomon's Mines (1885), Sir H. Rider Haggard	King Solomon's Mines (1986)
King Solomon's Mines (1885), Sir H. Rider Haggard	Allan Quatermain and the Temple of Skulls (2008)
King Solomon's Mines (1885), Sir H. Rider Haggard	Allan Quatermain and the Spear of Destiny (2023)
King Matt the First (Polish: Król Maciuś Pierwszy) (1922), Janusz Korczak	King Matt the First (1958)
King Matt the First (Polish: Król Maciuś Pierwszy) (1922), Janusz Korczak	King Matt the First (1997)
King Matt the First (Polish: Król Maciuś Pierwszy) (1922), Janusz Korczak	King Matt the First (2007)
The King's Damosel (1976), Vera Chapman	Quest for Camelot (1998)

== L ==
Children's book(s)	Film adaptation(s)
Lad: A Dog (1919), Albert Payson Terhune	Lad: A Dog (1963)
Lassie Come-Home (1940), Eric Knight	Lassie Come Home (1943)
Lassie Come-Home (1940), Eric Knight	Son of Lassie (1945)
Lassie Come-Home (1940), Eric Knight	Courage of Lassie (1946)
Lassie Come-Home (1940), Eric Knight	Hills of Home (1948)
Lassie Come-Home (1940), Eric Knight	The Sun Comes Up (1949)
Lassie Come-Home (1940), Eric Knight	Challenge to Lassie (1950)
Lassie Come-Home (1940), Eric Knight	The Painted Hills (1951)
Lassie Come-Home (1940), Eric Knight	Lassie's Great Adventure (1963)
Lassie Come-Home (1940), Eric Knight	Lassie and the Spirit of Thunder Mountain (1972)
Lassie Come-Home (1940), Eric Knight	The Magic of Lassie (1978)
Lassie Come-Home (1940), Eric Knight	Lassie: The New Beginning (1978)
Lassie Come-Home (1940), Eric Knight	Lassie (1994)
Lassie Come-Home (1940), Eric Knight	Lassie (2005)
Lassie Come-Home (1940), Eric Knight	Lassie Come Home (2020)
Lassie Come-Home (1940), Eric Knight	Lassie: A New Adventure (German: Lassie – Ein neues Abenteuer) (2023)
The Last Unicorn (1968), Peter S. Beagle	The Last Unicorn (1982)
Laura's Star (German: Lauras Stern) (1996), Klaus Baumgart	Laura's Star (2004)
Laura's Star (German: Lauras Stern) (1996), Klaus Baumgart	Laura's Star and the Mysterious Dragon Nian (German: Lauras Stern und der geheimnisvolle Drache Nian) (2009)
Laura's Star (German: Lauras Stern) (1996), Klaus Baumgart	Laura's Star and the Dream Monsters (German: Lauras Stern und die Traummonster) (2011)
The Leaf Men and the Brave Good Bugs (1996), William Joyce	Epic (2013)
Lemonade Mouth (2007), Mark Peter Hughes	Lemonade Mouth (2011)
The Letter for the King (Dutch: De brief voor de Koning) (1962), Tonke Dragt	The Letter for the King (2008)
Lisa and Lottie (German: Das doppelte Lottchen) (1949), Erich Kästner	Two Times Lotte (1950)
Lisa and Lottie (German: Das doppelte Lottchen) (1949), Erich Kästner	Hibari's Lullaby (ひばりの子守唄, Hibari no komoriuta) (1951)
Lisa and Lottie (German: Das doppelte Lottchen) (1949), Erich Kästner	Twice Upon a Time (1953)
Lisa and Lottie (German: Das doppelte Lottchen) (1949), Erich Kästner	The Parent Trap (1961) (Note: The Parent Trap (film series))
Lisa and Lottie (German: Das doppelte Lottchen) (1949), Erich Kästner	Kuzhandaiyum Deivamum (1965)
Lisa and Lottie (German: Das doppelte Lottchen) (1949), Erich Kästner	Leta Manasulu (1966)
Lisa and Lottie (German: Das doppelte Lottchen) (1949), Erich Kästner	Do Kaliyaan (1968)
Lisa and Lottie (German: Das doppelte Lottchen) (1949), Erich Kästner	Cheeky Little Angels (Korean: 개구장이 천사들, Gaegujangi Cheonsadeul) (1980)
Lisa and Lottie (German: Das doppelte Lottchen) (1949), Erich Kästner	Pyaar Ke Do Pal (1986)
Lisa and Lottie (German: Das doppelte Lottchen) (1949), Erich Kästner	The Parent Trap II (1987)
Lisa and Lottie (German: Das doppelte Lottchen) (1949), Erich Kästner	Parent Trap III (1988)
Lisa and Lottie (German: Das doppelte Lottchen) (1949), Erich Kästner	Parent Trap: Hawaiian Honeymoon (1989)
Lisa and Lottie (German: Das doppelte Lottchen) (1949), Erich Kästner	Charlie & Louise – Das doppelte Lottchen (1994)
Lisa and Lottie (German: Das doppelte Lottchen) (1949), Erich Kästner	Dvynukės (1994)
Lisa and Lottie (German: Das doppelte Lottchen) (1949), Erich Kästner	Strange Sisters (خواهران غریب) (1995)
Lisa and Lottie (German: Das doppelte Lottchen) (1949), Erich Kästner	The Parent Trap (1998)
Lisa and Lottie (German: Das doppelte Lottchen) (1949), Erich Kästner	Kuch Khatti Kuch Meethi (2001)
Lisa and Lottie (German: Das doppelte Lottchen) (1949), Erich Kästner	Tur & retur (2003)
Lisa and Lottie (German: Das doppelte Lottchen) (1949), Erich Kästner	Two Times Lotte (2007)
Lisa and Lottie (German: Das doppelte Lottchen) (1949), Erich Kästner	Das doppelte Lottchen (2017)
Little Bear (1957–2010) (series), Else Holmelund Minarik and Maurice Sendak	The Little Bear Movie (2001)
The Little Ghost (1966), Otfried Preußler	Das kleine Gespenst (1992)
The Little Ghost (1966), Otfried Preußler	Das Kleine Gespenst (2013)
Little Lord Fauntleroy (serialised 1885–1886, published as a book 1886), Frances Hodgson Burnett	Little Lord Fauntleroy (1914)
Little Lord Fauntleroy (serialised 1885–1886, published as a book 1886), Frances Hodgson Burnett	Little Lord Fauntleroy (1921)
Little Lord Fauntleroy (serialised 1885–1886, published as a book 1886), Frances Hodgson Burnett	Little Lord Fauntleroy (1936)
Little Lord Fauntleroy (serialised 1885–1886, published as a book 1886), Frances Hodgson Burnett	Little Lord Fauntleroy (1980)
"The Little Match Girl" (Danish: Den Lille Pige med Svovlstikkerne), from Danish Folk Calendar for 1846 (Danish: Dansk Folkekalender for 1846) (1845), Hans Christian Andersen	The World of Hans Christian Andersen (アンデルセン物語, Anderusen Monogatari) (1968)
"The Little Match Girl" (Danish: Den Lille Pige med Svovlstikkerne), from Danish Folk Calendar for 1846 (Danish: Dansk Folkekalender for 1846) (1845), Hans Christian Andersen	Stories from a Flying Trunk (1979)
"The Little Match Girl" (Danish: Den Lille Pige med Svovlstikkerne), from Danish Folk Calendar for 1846 (Danish: Dansk Folkekalender for 1846) (1845), Hans Christian Andersen	The Little Match Girl (1987)
"The Little Match Girl" (Danish: Den Lille Pige med Svovlstikkerne), from Danish Folk Calendar for 1846 (Danish: Dansk Folkekalender for 1846) (1845), Hans Christian Andersen	The Rose Seller (Spanish: La vendedora de rosas) (1998)
"The Little Match Girl" (Danish: Den Lille Pige med Svovlstikkerne), from Danish Folk Calendar for 1846 (Danish: Dansk Folkekalender for 1846) (1845), Hans Christian Andersen	Emily the Little Match Girl (2021)
Little Men (1871), Louisa May Alcott	Little Men (1940)
Little Men (1871), Louisa May Alcott	Little Men (1934)
Little Men (1871), Louisa May Alcott	Little Men (1998)
"The Little Mermaid" (Danish: Den lille havfrue), from Fairy Tales Told for Children. First Collection. Third Booklet. 1837. (Danish: Eventyr, fortalte for Børn. Første Samling. Tredie Hefte. 1837.) (1837), Hans Christian Andersen	Fantasía... 3 (1966)
"The Little Mermaid" (Danish: Den lille havfrue), from Fairy Tales Told for Children. First Collection. Third Booklet. 1837. (Danish: Eventyr, fortalte for Børn. Første Samling. Tredie Hefte. 1837.) (1837), Hans Christian Andersen	The Daydreamer (1966)
"The Little Mermaid" (Danish: Den lille havfrue), from Fairy Tales Told for Children. First Collection. Third Booklet. 1837. (Danish: Eventyr, fortalte for Børn. Første Samling. Tredie Hefte. 1837.) (1837), Hans Christian Andersen	Hans Christian Andersen's The Little Mermaid (アンデルセン童話 にんぎょ姫, Anderusen Dōwa Ningyo Hime) (1975)
"The Little Mermaid" (Danish: Den lille havfrue), from Fairy Tales Told for Children. First Collection. Third Booklet. 1837. (Danish: Eventyr, fortalte for Børn. Første Samling. Tredie Hefte. 1837.) (1837), Hans Christian Andersen	The Little Mermaid (1976) (Russian: Русалочка)
"The Little Mermaid" (Danish: Den lille havfrue), from Fairy Tales Told for Children. First Collection. Third Booklet. 1837. (Danish: Eventyr, fortalte for Børn. Første Samling. Tredie Hefte. 1837.) (1837), Hans Christian Andersen	The Little Mermaid (Czech: Malá mořská víla) (1976)
"The Little Mermaid" (Danish: Den lille havfrue), from Fairy Tales Told for Children. First Collection. Third Booklet. 1837. (Danish: Eventyr, fortalte for Børn. Første Samling. Tredie Hefte. 1837.) (1837), Hans Christian Andersen	The Little Mermaid (1989)
"The Little Mermaid" (Danish: Den lille havfrue), from Fairy Tales Told for Children. First Collection. Third Booklet. 1837. (Danish: Eventyr, fortalte for Børn. Første Samling. Tredie Hefte. 1837.) (1837), Hans Christian Andersen	The Little Mermaid (1992)
"The Little Mermaid" (Danish: Den lille havfrue), from Fairy Tales Told for Children. First Collection. Third Booklet. 1837. (Danish: Eventyr, fortalte for Børn. Første Samling. Tredie Hefte. 1837.) (1837), Hans Christian Andersen	The Little Mermaid (1998)
"The Little Mermaid" (Danish: Den lille havfrue), from Fairy Tales Told for Children. First Collection. Third Booklet. 1837. (Danish: Eventyr, fortalte for Børn. Første Samling. Tredie Hefte. 1837.) (1837), Hans Christian Andersen	The Little Mermaid II: Return to the Sea (2000)
"The Little Mermaid" (Danish: Den lille havfrue), from Fairy Tales Told for Children. First Collection. Third Booklet. 1837. (Danish: Eventyr, fortalte for Børn. Første Samling. Tredie Hefte. 1837.) (1837), Hans Christian Andersen	The Little Mermaid: Ariel's Beginning (2008)
"The Little Mermaid" (Danish: Den lille havfrue), from Fairy Tales Told for Children. First Collection. Third Booklet. 1837. (Danish: Eventyr, fortalte for Børn. Første Samling. Tredie Hefte. 1837.) (1837), Hans Christian Andersen	The Little Mermaid (2018)
"The Little Mermaid" (Danish: Den lille havfrue), from Fairy Tales Told for Children. First Collection. Third Booklet. 1837. (Danish: Eventyr, fortalte for Børn. Første Samling. Tredie Hefte. 1837.) (1837), Hans Christian Andersen	The Little Mermaid (2023; Disney)
"The Little Mermaid" (Danish: Den lille havfrue), from Fairy Tales Told for Children. First Collection. Third Booklet. 1837. (Danish: Eventyr, fortalte for Børn. Første Samling. Tredie Hefte. 1837.) (1837), Hans Christian Andersen	The Little Mermaid (2023; The Asylum)
Little Peter's Journey to the Moon (German: Peterchens Mondfahrt) (1915), Gerdt von Bassewitz	Peter in Magicland (1990)
Little Peter's Journey to the Moon (German: Peterchens Mondfahrt) (1915), Gerdt von Bassewitz	Moonbound (2021)
The Little Polar Bear (Dutch: Lars de kleine ijsbeer) (1987), Hans de Beer	The Little Polar Bear (German: Der kleine Eisbär) (2001)
The Little Polar Bear (Dutch: Lars de kleine ijsbeer) (1987), Hans de Beer	The Little Polar Bear 2: The Mysterious Island (German: Der Kleine Eisbär 2: Die Geheimnisvolle Insel) (2005)
A Little Princess (1904), Frances Hodgson Burnett	A Little Princess (1917)
A Little Princess (1904), Frances Hodgson Burnett	The Little Princess (1939)
A Little Princess (1904), Frances Hodgson Burnett	A Little Princess (1995)
A Little Princess (1904), Frances Hodgson Burnett	Sarah... The Little Princess (Tagalog: Sarah... Ang Munting Prinsesa) (1995)
A Little Princess (1904), Frances Hodgson Burnett	The Little Princess (1996)
A Little Princess (1904), Frances Hodgson Burnett	A Little Princess (Russian: Маленькая принцесса) (1997)
Little Toot (1939), Hardie Gramatky	Melody Time (1948)
Little Toot (1939), Hardie Gramatky	The New Adventures of Little Toot (1992)
The Little Vampire (German: Der kleine Vampir) (1979-2025) (series), Angela Sommer-Bodenburg	The Little Vampire (2000)
The Little Vampire (German: Der kleine Vampir) (1979-2025) (series), Angela Sommer-Bodenburg	The Little Vampire 3D (Dutch: De Kleine Vampier 3D) (2017)
The Little White Horse (1946), Elizabeth Goudge	The Secret of Moonacre (2009)
The Little Witch (1957), Otfried Preußler	Die kleine Hexe (2018)
Little Women (1868–1869), Louisa May Alcott	Little Women (1917)
Little Women (1868–1869), Louisa May Alcott	Little Women (1918)
Little Women (1868–1869), Louisa May Alcott	Little Women (1933)
Little Women (1868–1869), Louisa May Alcott	Little Women (1949)
Little Women (1868–1869), Louisa May Alcott	Mujercitas (1973)
Little Women (1868–1869), Louisa May Alcott	Little Women (若草物語, Wakakusa Monogatari) (1980)
Little Women (1868–1869), Louisa May Alcott	Little Women (1994)
Little Women (1868–1869), Louisa May Alcott	The March Sisters at Christmas (2012)
Little Women (1868–1869), Louisa May Alcott	Little Women (2018)
Little Women (1868–1869), Louisa May Alcott	Little Women (2019)
The Littles (1967—1985) (series), John Peterson	Here Come the Littles (1985)
The Littles (1967—1985) (series), John Peterson	Liberty and the Littles (1988)
"Lobo, the King of Currumpaw", from Wild Animals I Have Known (1898), Ernest Thompson Seton	The Legend of Lobo (1962)
The Lorax (1971), Dr. Seuss	The Lorax (2012)
The Lost Ones (1961), Donald G. Payne	The Island at the Top of the World (1974)
Lyle, Lyle, Crocodile (1965), Bernard Waber	Lyle, Lyle, Crocodile (2022)

== M ==
Children's book(s)	Film adaptation(s)
Madeline (1939–1999) (series), Ludwig Bemelmans and John Bemelmans-Marciano	Alice of Wonderland in Paris (1966)
Madeline (1939–1999) (series), Ludwig Bemelmans and John Bemelmans-Marciano	Madeline (1998)
Madeline (1939–1999) (series), Ludwig Bemelmans and John Bemelmans-Marciano	Madeline: Lost in Paris (1999)
Madeline (1939–1999) (series), Ludwig Bemelmans and John Bemelmans-Marciano	My Fair Madeline (2002)
Madeline (1939–1999) (series), Ludwig Bemelmans and John Bemelmans-Marciano	Madeline in Tahiti (2007)
Madicken (1951–1956) (series), Astrid Lindgren	Du är inte klok, Madicken (You're Out of Your Mind, Madicken) (1979)
Madicken (1951–1956) (series), Astrid Lindgren	Madicken på Junibacken (Madicken at June Hall) (1980)
Madame Doubtfire (1987), Anne Fine	Mrs. Doubtfire (1993)
The Magic Faraway Tree (1943), Enid Blyton	The Magic Faraway Tree (2026)
The Magician's Elephant (2009), Kate DiCamillo	The Magician's Elephant (2023)
Mandie (1983–2004) (series) (Note: Works adapted from the series in chronological order: Mandie and the Secret Tunnel (1983) and Mandie and the Cherokee Legend (1983) respectively.), Lois Gladys Leppard	Mandie and the Secret Tunnel (2009)
Mandie (1983–2004) (series), Lois Gladys Leppard	Mandie and the Cherokee Treasure (2010)
Mandie (1983–2004) (series), Lois Gladys Leppard	Mandie and the Forgotten Christmas (2011)
Mariah Mundi - The Midas Box (2007), G. P. Taylor	The Adventurer: The Curse of the Midas Box (2014)
Mary Poppins (1934–1988) (series), P. L. Travers	Mary Poppins (1964)
Mary Poppins (1934–1988) (series), P. L. Travers	Mary Poppins Returns (2018)
Mars Needs Moms! (2007), Berkeley Breathed	Mars Needs Moms (2011)
The Marvelous Land of Oz (1904), L. Frank Baum	The Fairylogue and Radio-Plays (1908)
The Marvelous Land of Oz (1904), L. Frank Baum	The Land of Oz, a Sequel to the Wizard of Oz (1931)
The Marvelous Land of Oz (1904), L. Frank Baum	The Wonderful Land of Oz (1969)
The Marvelous Land of Oz (1904), L. Frank Baum	Journey Back to Oz (1972)
The Marvelous Land of Oz (1904), L. Frank Baum	Return to Oz (1985) (Note: Conflation of the second and third books in the Land of Oz series.)
The Marvelous Land of Oz (1904), L. Frank Baum	Tom and Jerry: Back to Oz (2016)
Matilda (1988), Roald Dahl	Matilda (1996)
Matilda (1988), Roald Dahl	Matilda the Musical (2022)
Maximum Ride: The Angel Experiment (2005), James Patterson	Maximum Ride (2016)
The Maze Runner (2009–2016) (series) (Note: Works adapted from the series in chronological order: The Maze Runner (2009), The Scorch Trials (2010) and The Death Cure (2011).), James Dashner	The Maze Runner (2014)
The Maze Runner (2009–2016) (series), James Dashner	Maze Runner: The Scorch Trials (2015)
The Maze Runner (2009–2016) (series), James Dashner	Maze Runner: The Death Cure (2018)
Me and Earl and the Dying Girl (2012), Jesse Andrews	Me and Earl and the Dying Girl (2015)
Midnight and Jeremiah (1943), Sterling North	So Dear to My Heart (1949)
Les Mille et Une Nuits (Note: lit. 'The Thousand and One Nights') (1704–1717) (Note: Short story collection; stories adapted from this work in order: from volume III, "Histoire de Sindbad le Marin" (1705); volumes XI and X, "Histoire d'Aladdin ou la Lampe merveilleuse" and "Suite de l'Histoire d'Aladdin ou la Lampe merveilleuse" (1710); from volume XI, "Histoire d'Ali-Baba et de quarante voleurs exterminés par une esclave" (1701); from volume XII, "Histoire du prince Ahmed et de la fee Pari-Banou" (1709).), Antoine Galland	Aladdin and the Wonderful Lamp (1917)
Les Mille et Une Nuits (1704–1717), Antoine Galland	Ali Baba and the Forty Thieves (1918)
Les Mille et Une Nuits (1704–1717), Antoine Galland	The Adventures of Prince Achmed (German: Die Abenteuer des Prinzen Achmed) (1926)
Les Mille et Une Nuits (1704–1717), Antoine Galland	Alibabavum 40 Thirudargalum (Tamil: அலிபாபாவும் 40 திருடர்களும்) (1941)
Les Mille et Une Nuits (1704–1717), Antoine Galland	Arabian Nights (1942)
Les Mille et Une Nuits (1704–1717), Antoine Galland	Ali Baba and the Forty Thieves (1944)
Les Mille et Une Nuits (1704–1717), Antoine Galland	Sinbad the Sailor (1947)
Les Mille et Une Nuits (1704–1717), Antoine Galland	Aladdin and His Lamp (1952)
Les Mille et Une Nuits (1704–1717), Antoine Galland	Aladdin Aur Jadui Chirag (Hindi: अलादीन और जादु चिराग) (1952)
Les Mille et Une Nuits (1704–1717), Antoine Galland	Son of Ali Baba (1952)
Les Mille et Une Nuits (1704–1717), Antoine Galland	Ali Baba and the Forty Thieves (French: Ali Baba et les 40 voleurs) (1954;)
Les Mille et Une Nuits (1704–1717), Antoine Galland	Alibaba Aur 40 Chor (Hindi: अलीबाबा और चालीस चोर) (1954)
Les Mille et Une Nuits (1704–1717), Antoine Galland	Son of Sinbad (1955)
Les Mille et Une Nuits (1704–1717), Antoine Galland	Alibabavum 40 Thirudargalum (1956 film)
Les Mille et Une Nuits (1704–1717), Antoine Galland	Alladin and the Wonderful Lamp (Telugu: అల్లావుద్దీన్ అద్భుతదీపం) (1957)
Les Mille et Une Nuits (1704–1717), Antoine Galland	Aladdin (1958)
Les Mille et Une Nuits (1704–1717), Antoine Galland	Daughter of Sindbad (1958)
Les Mille et Une Nuits (1704–1717), Antoine Galland	The 7th Voyage of Sinbad (1958)
Les Mille et Une Nuits (1704–1717), Antoine Galland	1001 Arabian Nights (1959)
Les Mille et Une Nuits (1704–1717), Antoine Galland	The Wonders of Aladdin (Italian: Le meraviglie di Aladino) (1961)
Les Mille et Une Nuits (1704–1717), Antoine Galland	Arabian Nights: The Adventures of Sinbad (Japanese: アラビアンナイト・シンドバッドの冒険, Arabian naito: Shindobaddo no bôken) (1962)
Les Mille et Une Nuits (1704–1717), Antoine Galland	Captain Sindbad (1963)
Les Mille et Une Nuits (1704–1717), Antoine Galland	Ali Baba and the Seven Saracens (Italian: Sindbad contro i sette saraceni) (1964)
Les Mille et Une Nuits (1704–1717), Antoine Galland	Sindbad Alibaba and Aladdin (1965)
Les Mille et Une Nuits (1704–1717), Antoine Galland	Aladdin and His Magic Lamp (1966)
Les Mille et Une Nuits (1704–1717), Antoine Galland	Alibaba Aur 40 Chor (1966)
Les Mille et Une Nuits (1704–1717), Antoine Galland	Aladdin and His Magic Lamp (1967)
Les Mille et Une Nuits (1704–1717), Antoine Galland	Aladdin and His Magic Lamp (French: Aladin et la Lampe Merveilleuse) (1970)
Les Mille et Une Nuits (1704–1717), Antoine Galland	Ali Baba 40 Dongalu (Telugu: ఆలీబాబా 40 దొంగలు) (1970)
Les Mille et Une Nuits (1704–1717), Antoine Galland	Ali Baba and the Forty Thieves (Japan: アリババと40匹の盗賊, Ari Baba to Yonjūppiki no Tōzoku) (1971)
Les Mille et Une Nuits (1704–1717), Antoine Galland	Sinbad and the Caliph of Baghdad (Italian: Simbad e il califfo di Bagdad) (1973)
Les Mille et Une Nuits (1704–1717), Antoine Galland	The Golden Voyage of Sinbad (1973)
Les Mille et Une Nuits (1704–1717), Antoine Galland	Adventures of Sinbad the Sailor (1974)
Les Mille et Une Nuits (1704–1717), Antoine Galland	Alibabayum 41 Kallanmaarum (Malayalam: ആലിബാബയും 41 കള്ളന്മാരും) (1975)
Les Mille et Une Nuits (1704–1717), Antoine Galland	Sinbad and the Eye of the Tiger (1977)
Les Mille et Une Nuits (1704–1717), Antoine Galland	Adventures of Aladdin (1978)
Les Mille et Une Nuits (1704–1717), Antoine Galland	Allauddinum Albhutha Vilakkum (Malayalam: അലാവുദ്ദീനും അത്ഭുതവിളക്കും, Tamil: அலாவுதீனும் அற்புத விளக்கும்) (1979)
Les Mille et Une Nuits (1704–1717), Antoine Galland	The Adventures of Sinbad (1979)
Les Mille et Une Nuits (1704–1717), Antoine Galland	Adventures of Ali-Baba and the Forty Thieves (1980)
Les Mille et Une Nuits (1704–1717), Antoine Galland	Aladdin and the Wonderful Lamp (1982)
Les Mille et Une Nuits (1704–1717), Antoine Galland	Aladdin (1986)
Les Mille et Une Nuits (1704–1717), Antoine Galland	Sinbad of the Seven Seas (1989)
Les Mille et Une Nuits (1704–1717), Antoine Galland	1001 Nights (French: Les 1001 Nuits) (1990)
Les Mille et Une Nuits (1704–1717), Antoine Galland	Aladdin (1990)
Les Mille et Une Nuits (1704–1717), Antoine Galland	Ali Baba (1991)
Les Mille et Une Nuits (1704–1717), Antoine Galland	Aladdin (1992; Golden Films)
Les Mille et Une Nuits (1704–1717), Antoine Galland	Sinbad (1992)
Les Mille et Une Nuits (1704–1717), Antoine Galland	Aladdin (1992; Bevanfield Films)
Les Mille et Une Nuits (1704–1717), Antoine Galland	Aladdin (1992; Disney)
Les Mille et Une Nuits (1704–1717), Antoine Galland	Scooby-Doo! in Arabian Nights (1994)
Les Mille et Une Nuits (1704–1717), Antoine Galland	Ali Baba (Italian: Alì Babà) (1996)
Les Mille et Une Nuits (1704–1717), Antoine Galland	Ali Baba and the Pirates (Italian: Alì Babà e i pirati) (1997) (Note: Sequel to the 1996 film.)
Les Mille et Une Nuits (1704–1717), Antoine Galland	Aladdin and the Adventure of All Time (2000)
Les Mille et Une Nuits (1704–1717), Antoine Galland	Alibaba (2002)
Les Mille et Une Nuits (1704–1717), Antoine Galland	Son of Alladin (2003)
Les Mille et Une Nuits (1704–1717), Antoine Galland	Sinbad: Legend of the Seven Seas (2003)
Les Mille et Une Nuits (1704–1717), Antoine Galland	Alibaba Aur 40 Chor (2004)
Les Mille et Une Nuits (1704–1717), Antoine Galland	Aladin (2009)
Les Mille et Une Nuits (1704–1717), Antoine Galland	The 7 Adventures of Sinbad (2010)
Les Mille et Une Nuits (1704–1717), Antoine Galland	Sinbad and the Minotaur (2011)
Les Mille et Une Nuits (1704–1717), Antoine Galland	The Adventures of Sinbad (2013)
Les Mille et Une Nuits (1704–1717), Antoine Galland	The New Adventures of Aladdin (French: Les Nouvelles Aventures d'Aladin) (2015)
Les Mille et Une Nuits (1704–1717), Antoine Galland	Sinbad: A Flying Princess and a Secret Island (2015)
Les Mille et Une Nuits (1704–1717), Antoine Galland	Sinbad: The Magic Lamp and the Moving Islands (2016)
Les Mille et Une Nuits (1704–1717), Antoine Galland	Sinbad: Night at High Noon and the Wonder Gate (2016)
Les Mille et Une Nuits (1704–1717), Antoine Galland	Alibaba and the Forty Thieves (2018)
Les Mille et Une Nuits (1704–1717), Antoine Galland	Alad'2 (2018)
Les Mille et Une Nuits (1704–1717), Antoine Galland	Aladdin (2019)
Les Mille et Une Nuits (1704–1717), Antoine Galland	Alibaba Aani Chalishitale Chor (2024)
Les Mille et Une Nuits (1704–1717), Antoine Galland	Aladdin 3477- I: The Jinn of Wisdom (2025)
Millions (2004), Frank Cottrell Boyce	Millions (2004)
Minoes (1970), Annie M.G. Schmidt	Miss Minoes (2001)
Mio, My Son (Swedish: Mio, min Mio) (1954), Astrid Lindgren	Mio in the Land of Faraway (1987)
Miss Peregrine's Home for Peculiar Children (2011), Ransom Riggs	Miss Peregrine's Home for Peculiar Children (2016)
Miss Spider (1996–2001) (series), David Kirk	Miss Spider's Sunny Patch Kids (2003)
Misty of Chincoteague (1947), Marguerite Henry	Misty (1961)
Molly Moon's Incredible Book of Hypnotism (2002), Georgia Byng	Molly Moon and the Incredible Book of Hypnotism (2015)
The Monkeys (1962), G.K. Wilkinson	Monkeys, Go Home! (1966)
A Monster Calls (2011), Patrick Ness	A Monster Calls (2016)
The Mortal Instruments – Book One: City of Bones (2007), Cassandra Clare	The Mortal Instruments: City of Bones (2013)
Mother Carey's Chickens (1911), Kate Douglas Wiggin	Mother Carey's Chickens (1938)
Mother Carey's Chickens (1911), Kate Douglas Wiggin	Summer Magic (1963)
Mr. Popper's Penguins (1938), Richard and Florence Atwater	Mr. Popper's Penguins (2011)
Mr Stink (2009), David Walliams	Mr Stink (2012)
Mrs. Frisby and the Rats of NIMH (1971), Robert C. O'Brien	The Secret of NIMH (1982)
Mrs. Frisby and the Rats of NIMH (1971), Robert C. O'Brien	The Secret of NIMH 2: Timmy to the Rescue (1999)
My Friend Flicka (1941), Mary O'Hara	My Friend Flicka (1943)
My Friend Flicka (1941), Mary O'Hara	Flicka (2006)
My Friend Flicka (1941), Mary O'Hara	Flicka 2 (2010)
My Friend Flicka (1941), Mary O'Hara	Flicka: Country Pride (2012)
My Side of the Mountain (1959), Jean Craighead George	My Side of the Mountain (1969)

== N ==
Children's book(s)	Film adaptation(s)
Nancy Drew (1930–2012) (series) (Note: Plots adapted from two related works: The Hidden Staircase (1930) and The Password to Larkspur Lane (1933) respectively.), Carolyn Keene	Nancy Drew... Detective (1938)
Nancy Drew (1930–2012) (series), Carolyn Keene	Nancy Drew... Reporter (1939)
Nancy Drew (1930–2012) (series), Carolyn Keene	Nancy Drew... Trouble Shooter (1939)
Nancy Drew (1930–2012) (series), Carolyn Keene	Nancy Drew and the Hidden Staircase (1939)
Nancy Drew (1930–2012) (series), Carolyn Keene	Nancy Drew (2002)
Nancy Drew (1930–2012) (series), Carolyn Keene	Nancy Drew (2007)
Nancy Drew (1930–2012) (series), Carolyn Keene	Nancy Drew and the Hidden Staircase (2019)
Naomi and Ely's No Kiss List (2007), Rachel Cohn, David Levithan	Naomi and Ely's No Kiss List (2015)
Nerve (2012), Jeanne Ryan	Nerve (2016)
The Neverending Story (German: Die unendliche Geschichte) (1979), Michael Ende	The NeverEnding Story (1984)
The Neverending Story (German: Die unendliche Geschichte) (1979), Michael Ende	The NeverEnding Story II: The Next Chapter (1990)
The Neverending Story (German: Die unendliche Geschichte) (1979), Michael Ende	The NeverEnding Story III (1994)
Nicholas Nickleby (serialised 1838–1839, published as a book 1839), Charles Dickens	The Life and Adventures of Nicholas Nickleby (1947)
Nicholas Nickleby (serialised 1838–1839, published as a book 1839), Charles Dickens	Nicholas Nickleby (1985)
Nicholas Nickleby (serialised 1838–1839, published as a book 1839), Charles Dickens	The Life and Adventures of Nicholas Nickleby (2001)
Nicholas Nickleby (serialised 1838–1839, published as a book 1839), Charles Dickens	Nicholas Nickleby (2002)
Nicky Deuce: Welcome to the Family (2005), Steven R. Schirripa and Charles Fleming	Nicky Deuce (2013)
Nico the Unicorn (1996), Frank Sacks	Nico the Unicorn (1999)
Nick & Norah's Infinite Playlist (2006), Rachel Cohn, David Levithan	Nick and Norah's Infinite Playlist (2008)
The Night at the Museum (1993), Milan Trenc	Night at the Museum (2006)
The Night at the Museum (1993), Milan Trenc	Night at the Museum: Battle of the Smithsonian (2009)
The Night at the Museum (1993), Milan Trenc	Night at the Museum: Secret of the Tomb (2014)
The Night at the Museum (1993), Milan Trenc	Night at the Museum: Kahmunrah Rises Again (2022)
"The Nightingale" (Danish: Nattergale), from New Fairy Tales. First Volume. First Collection (Danish: Nye Eventyr. Første Bind. Første Samling) (1943), Hans Christian Andersen	The Emperor's Nightingale (Czech: Císařův slavík) (1949)
"The Nightingale" (Danish: Nattergale), from New Fairy Tales. First Volume. First Collection (Danish: Nye Eventyr. Første Bind. Første Samling) (1943), Hans Christian Andersen	The Nightingale (1981)
Nim's Island (2001), Wendy Orr and Kerry Millard	Nim's Island (2008)
Nim's Island (2001), Wendy Orr and Kerry Millard	Return to Nim's Island (2013)
Northern Lights (1995), Philip Pullman	The Golden Compass (2007)
Nurse Matilda (1964–1974) (series), Christianna Brand	Nanny McPhee (2005)
Nurse Matilda (1964–1974) (series), Christianna Brand	Nanny McPhee and the Big Bang (2010)
Nuthin' (1953), Harry Edward Webb	A Boy Called Nuthin' (1967)

== O ==
Children's book(s)	Film adaptation(s)
Odyssey (8th century BC), Homer	The Odyssey (Italian: L'Odissea) (1911)
Odyssey (8th century BC), Homer	Ulysses (1955)
Odyssey (8th century BC), Homer	The Odyssey (1987)
Odyssey (8th century BC), Homer	Ulysses' Gaze (Greek: Το βλέμμα του Οδυσσέα, To Vlemma tou Odyssea) (1995)
Odyssey (8th century BC), Homer	O Brother, Where Art Thou? (2000)
Odyssey (8th century BC), Homer	Odysseus and the Isle of the Mists (2007)
Odyssey (8th century BC), Homer	The Odyssey (2026)
The Old Curiosity Shop (serialised 1840–1841, published as a book 1841), Charles Dickens	The Old Curiosity Shop (1914)
The Old Curiosity Shop (serialised 1840–1841, published as a book 1841), Charles Dickens	The Old Curiosity Shop (1921)
The Old Curiosity Shop (serialised 1840–1841, published as a book 1841), Charles Dickens	The Old Curiosity Shop (1934)
The Old Curiosity Shop (serialised 1840–1841, published as a book 1841), Charles Dickens	Mister Quilp (1975)
The Old Curiosity Shop (serialised 1840–1841, published as a book 1841), Charles Dickens	The Old Curiosity Shop (1984)
The Old Curiosity Shop (serialised 1840–1841, published as a book 1841), Charles Dickens	The Old Curiosity Shop (1995)
The Old Curiosity Shop (serialised 1840–1841, published as a book 1841), Charles Dickens	The Old Curiosity Shop (2007)
Old Yeller (1956), Fred Gipson	Old Yeller (1957)
Old Yeller (1956), Fred Gipson	Savage Sam (1963)
Old Yeller (1956), Fred Gipson	Little Arliss (1984)
Oliver Twist (serialised 1837–1839, published as a book 1838), Charles Dickens	Oliver Twist (1912; British)
Oliver Twist (serialised 1837–1839, published as a book 1838), Charles Dickens	Oliver Twist (1912; American)
Oliver Twist (serialised 1837–1839, published as a book 1838), Charles Dickens	Oliver Twist (1916)
Oliver Twist (serialised 1837–1839, published as a book 1838), Charles Dickens	Oliver Twist, Jr. (1921)
Oliver Twist (serialised 1837–1839, published as a book 1838), Charles Dickens	Oliver Twist (1922)
Oliver Twist (serialised 1837–1839, published as a book 1838), Charles Dickens	Oliver Twist (1933)
Oliver Twist (serialised 1837–1839, published as a book 1838), Charles Dickens	Oliver Twist (1948)
Oliver Twist (serialised 1837–1839, published as a book 1838), Charles Dickens	Oliver! (1968)
Oliver Twist (serialised 1837–1839, published as a book 1838), Charles Dickens	Oliver and the Artful Dodger (1972)
Oliver Twist (serialised 1837–1839, published as a book 1838), Charles Dickens	Oliver Twist (1974)
Oliver Twist (serialised 1837–1839, published as a book 1838), Charles Dickens	Oliver Twist (1982, Hallmark Hall of Fame)
Oliver Twist (serialised 1837–1839, published as a book 1838), Charles Dickens	Oliver Twist (1982, Burbank Films Australia)
Oliver Twist (serialised 1837–1839, published as a book 1838), Charles Dickens	Las Aventuras de Oliver Twist (1987)
Oliver Twist (serialised 1837–1839, published as a book 1838), Charles Dickens	Oliver & Company (1988)
Oliver Twist (serialised 1837–1839, published as a book 1838), Charles Dickens	Twisted (1996)
Oliver Twist (serialised 1837–1839, published as a book 1838), Charles Dickens	Oliver Twist (1997)
Oliver Twist (serialised 1837–1839, published as a book 1838), Charles Dickens	Twist (2003)
Oliver Twist (serialised 1837–1839, published as a book 1838), Charles Dickens	Boy called Twist (2004)
Oliver Twist (serialised 1837–1839, published as a book 1838), Charles Dickens	Oliver Twist (2005)
Oliver Twist (serialised 1837–1839, published as a book 1838), Charles Dickens	Twist (2021)
On Stranger Tides (1987), Tim Powers	Pirates of the Caribbean: On Stranger Tides (2011)
One Thousand and One Nights (Arabic: أَلْفُ لَيْلَةٍ وَلَيْلَةٌ ʾAlf Laylah wa-Laylah) (Note: Year and author undetermined; many narratives, characters and elements of the work originated over many centuries by various Middle Eastern sources.)	The Thief of Bagdad (1924)
One Thousand and One Nights (Arabic: أَلْفُ لَيْلَةٍ وَلَيْلَةٌ ʾAlf Laylah wa-Laylah)	The Thief of Bagdad (1940)
One Thousand and One Nights (Arabic: أَلْفُ لَيْلَةٍ وَلَيْلَةٌ ʾAlf Laylah wa-Laylah)	Arabian Nights (1942)
One Thousand and One Nights (Arabic: أَلْفُ لَيْلَةٍ وَلَيْلَةٌ ʾAlf Laylah wa-Laylah)	A Thousand and One Nights (1945)
One Thousand and One Nights (Arabic: أَلْفُ لَيْلَةٍ وَلَيْلَةٌ ʾAlf Laylah wa-Laylah)	The Thief of Bagdad (German: Die Diebin von Bagdad) (1952)
One Thousand and One Nights (Arabic: أَلْفُ لَيْلَةٍ وَلَيْلَةٌ ʾAlf Laylah wa-Laylah)	1001 Arabian Nights (1959)
One Thousand and One Nights (Arabic: أَلْفُ لَيْلَةٍ وَلَيْلَةٌ ʾAlf Laylah wa-Laylah)	The Thief of Baghdad (Italian: Il ladro di Bagdad) (1961)
One Thousand and One Nights (Arabic: أَلْفُ لَيْلَةٍ وَلَيْلَةٌ ʾAlf Laylah wa-Laylah)	A Thousand and One Nights (千夜一夜物語, Senya Ichiya Monogatari) (1969)
One Thousand and One Nights (Arabic: أَلْفُ لَيْلَةٍ وَلَيْلَةٌ ʾAlf Laylah wa-Laylah)	Arabian Nights (Italian: Il fiore delle mille e una notte) (1974)
One Thousand and One Nights (Arabic: أَلْفُ لَيْلَةٍ وَلَيْلَةٌ ʾAlf Laylah wa-Laylah)	The Thief of Baghdad (1978)
One Thousand and One Nights (Arabic: أَلْفُ لَيْلَةٍ وَلَيْلَةٌ ʾAlf Laylah wa-Laylah)	Scooby-Doo in Arabian Nights (1994)
One Thousand and One Nights (Arabic: أَلْفُ لَيْلَةٍ وَلَيْلَةٌ ʾAlf Laylah wa-Laylah)	Arabian Nights (Portuguese: As Mil e uma Noites) (2015)
Orion and the Dark (2014), Emma Yarlett	Orion and the Dark (2024)
The Outsiders (1967), S.E. Hinton	The Outsiders (1983)
Ozma of Oz (1907), L. Frank Baum	Return to Oz (1985)

== P ==
Children's book(s)	Film adaptation(s)
Paddington Bear (1958—2018) (series), Michael Bond	Paddington (2014)
Paddington Bear (1958—2018) (series), Michael Bond	Paddington 2 (2017)
Paddington Bear (1958—2018) (series), Michael Bond	Paddington in Peru (2024)
The Patchwork Girl of Oz (1913), L. Frank Baum	The Patchwork Girl of Oz (1914)
The Patchwork Girl of Oz (1913), L. Frank Baum	The Patchwork Girl of Oz (2005)
Pelle-No-Tail (Swedish: Pelle Svanslös) (1939–1972) (series) (Note: Works adapted from the series in chronological order: the first (The Adventures of Pelle-No-Tail (Swedish: Pelle Svanslös på äventyr) (1939)) and the third (Pelle-No-Tail in America (Swedish: Pelle Svanslös i Amerika) (1941)) respectively.), Gösta Knutsson	Peter-No-Tail (Swedish: Pelle Svanslös) (1981)
Pelle-No-Tail (Swedish: Pelle Svanslös) (1939–1972) (series), Gösta Knutsson	Peter-No-Tail in Americat (Swedish: Pelle Svanslös i Amerikatt) (1985)
Pelle-No-Tail (Swedish: Pelle Svanslös) (1939–1972) (series), Gösta Knutsson	Peter-No-Tail and the Great Treasure Hunt (Swedish: Pelle Svanslös och den stora skattjakten) (2000)
Pelle-No-Tail (Swedish: Pelle Svanslös) (1939–1972) (series), Gösta Knutsson	Pelle-No-Tail (Swedish: Pelle Svanslös) (2020)
Percy Jackson & the Olympians (2005–2009) (series) (Note: Plots adapted from two related works: The Lightning Thief (2005) and The Sea of Monsters (2006) respectively.), Rick Riordan	Percy Jackson & the Olympians: The Lightning Thief (2010)
Percy Jackson & the Olympians (2005–2009) (series), Rick Riordan	Percy Jackson: Sea of Monsters (2013)
The Perks of Being a Wallflower (1999), Stephen Chbosky	The Perks of Being a Wallflower (2012)
Perri: The Youth of a Squirrel (German: Die Jugend des Eichhörnchens Perri) (1938), Felix Salten	Perri (1957)
Peter and Wendy (1911) (Note: Based on the original author's play Peter Pan; or, the Boy Who Wouldn't Grow Up (1904).), J. M. Barrie	Peter Pan (1924)
Peter and Wendy (1911), J. M. Barrie	Peter Pan (1953)
Peter and Wendy (1911), J. M. Barrie	Peter Pan (1976)
Peter and Wendy (1911), J. M. Barrie	Peter Pan (Russian: Питер Пэн) (1987)
Peter and Wendy (1911), J. M. Barrie	Peter Pan (1988)
Peter and Wendy (1911), J. M. Barrie	Hook (1991)
Peter and Wendy (1911), J. M. Barrie	Return to Never Land (2002)
Peter and Wendy (1911), J. M. Barrie	Peter Pan (2003)
Peter and Wendy (1911), J. M. Barrie	Neverland (2003)
Peter and Wendy (1911), J. M. Barrie	Finding Neverland (2004)
Peter and Wendy (1911), J. M. Barrie	Tinker Bell (2008)
Peter and Wendy (1911), J. M. Barrie	Tinker Bell and the Lost Treasure (2009)
Peter and Wendy (1911), J. M. Barrie	Tinker Bell and the Great Fairy Rescue (2010)
Peter and Wendy (1911), J. M. Barrie	Secret of the Wings (2012)
Peter and Wendy (1911), J. M. Barrie	The Pirate Fairy (2014)
Peter and Wendy (1911), J. M. Barrie	Tinker Bell and the Legend of the NeverBeast (2014)
Peter and Wendy (1911), J. M. Barrie	Pan (2015)
Peter and Wendy (1911), J. M. Barrie	Peter and Wendy (2015)
Peter and Wendy (1911), J. M. Barrie	Wendy (2020)
Peter and Wendy (1911), J. M. Barrie	Come Away (2020)
Peter and Wendy (1911), J. M. Barrie	Peter Pan & Wendy (2023)
Le Petit Nicolas (1959–1964), René Goscinny and Jean-Jacques Sempé	Little Nicholas (French: Le Petit Nicolas) (2009)
Le Petit Nicolas (1959–1964), René Goscinny and Jean-Jacques Sempé	Nicholas on Holiday (French: Les Vacances du Petit Nicolas) (2014)
Le Petit Nicolas (1959–1964), René Goscinny and Jean-Jacques Sempé	Little Nicholas's Treasure (French: Le Trésor du Petit Nicolas) (2021)
Le Petit Nicolas (1959–1964), René Goscinny and Jean-Jacques Sempé	Little Nicholas: Happy As Can Be (French: Le Petit Nicolas: Qu'est-ce qu'on attend pour être heureux?) (2022)
The Phantom Tollbooth (1961), Norton Juster	The Phantom Tollbooth (1970)
The Pickwick Papers (serialised 1836–1837, published as a book 1837), Charles Dickens	The Adventures of Mr. Pickwick (1921)
The Pickwick Papers (serialised 1836–1837, published as a book 1837), Charles Dickens	The Pickwick Papers (1952)
The Pickwick Papers (serialised 1836–1837, published as a book 1837), Charles Dickens	The Pickwick Papers (1985)
The Pickwick Papers (serialised 1836–1837, published as a book 1837), Charles Dickens	Ghost Stories from the Pickwick Papers (1987)
Pippi Longstocking (Swedish: Pippi Långstrump) (1945–1948, 1950–2001) (series) (Note: Works adapted from the series in chronological order: the first (Pippi Longstocking (Swedish: Pippi Långstrump) (1945)), the second (Pippi Goes on Board (Swedish: Pippi Långstrump går ombord) (1946)) and the third (Pippi in the South Seas (Swedish: Pippi Långstrump i Söderhavet) (1948)) respectively.), Astrid Lindgren	Pippi Longstocking (1949)
Pippi Longstocking (Swedish: Pippi Långstrump) (1945–1948, 1950–2001) (series), Astrid Lindgren	Pippi Longstocking (1969)
Pippi Longstocking (Swedish: Pippi Långstrump) (1945–1948, 1950–2001) (series), Astrid Lindgren	Pippi Goes on Board (1969)
Pippi Longstocking (Swedish: Pippi Långstrump) (1945–1948, 1950–2001) (series), Astrid Lindgren	Pippi in the South Seas (1970)
Pippi Longstocking (Swedish: Pippi Långstrump) (1945–1948, 1950–2001) (series), Astrid Lindgren	Pippi on the Run (1970)
Pippi Longstocking (Swedish: Pippi Långstrump) (1945–1948, 1950–2001) (series), Astrid Lindgren	Peppi Dlinnyychulok (Russian: Пеппи Длинныйчулок) (1982)
Pippi Longstocking (Swedish: Pippi Långstrump) (1945–1948, 1950–2001) (series), Astrid Lindgren	The New Adventures of Pippi Longstocking (1988)
Pippi Longstocking (Swedish: Pippi Långstrump) (1945–1948, 1950–2001) (series), Astrid Lindgren	Pippi Longstocking (1997)
The Pirates! In an Adventure with Scientists (2004), Gideon Defoe	The Pirates! In an Adventure with Scientists! (2012)
The Polar Express (1985), Chris Van Allsburg	The Polar Express (2004)
Pollyanna (1913), Eleanor H. Porter	Pollyanna (1920)
Pollyanna (1913), Eleanor H. Porter	Pollyanna (1960)
Pollyanna (1913), Eleanor H. Porter	Hayat sevince güzel (1971)
Pollyanna (1913), Eleanor H. Porter	The Adventures of Pollyanna (1982)
Pollyanna (1913), Eleanor H. Porter	Polly (1989)
Pollyanna (1913), Eleanor H. Porter	Polly: Comin' Home! (1990)
Pollyanna (1913), Eleanor H. Porter	Pollyanna (2003)
"The Poor Miller's Boy and the Cat" (German: Der arme Müllerbursch und das Kätzchen), from Grimms' Fairy Tales (German: Kinder- und Haus-Märchen. Bd. 2., Children's and Household Tales Volume 2) (1815), Brothers Grimm	Der arme Müllerbursch und das Kätzchen (1971)
Practical Magic (1995), Alice Hoffman	Practical Magic (1998)
The Prince and the Pauper (1881), Mark Twain
The Prince and the Pauper (1881), Mark Twain	The Prince and the Pauper (1915)
The Prince and the Pauper (1881), Mark Twain	The Prince and the Pauper (German: Der Prinz und der Bettelknabe) (1920)
The Prince and the Pauper (1881), Mark Twain	The Prince and the Pauper (1937)
The Prince and the Pauper (1881), Mark Twain	The Prince and the Pauper (1943)
The Prince and the Pauper (1881), Mark Twain	The Prince and the Pauper (1962)
The Prince and the Pauper (1881), Mark Twain	Raja Aur Runk (1968)
The Prince and the Pauper (1881), Mark Twain	The Adventures of the Prince and the Pauper (1969)
The Prince and the Pauper (1881), Mark Twain	The Prince and the Pauper (Czech: Princ a chuďas) (1971)
The Prince and the Pauper (1881), Mark Twain	The Prince and the Pauper (1972)
The Prince and the Pauper (1881), Mark Twain	The Prince and the Pauper (Russian: Принц и нищий) (1972)
The Prince and the Pauper (1881), Mark Twain	The Prince and the Pauper (1977)
The Prince and the Pauper (1881), Mark Twain	The Prince and the Pauper (1995)
The Prince and the Pauper (1881), Mark Twain	The Prince and the Pauper (1996)
The Prince and the Pauper (1881), Mark Twain	The Prince and the Surfer (1999)
The Prince and the Pauper (1881), Mark Twain	The Pooch and the Pauper (2000)
The Prince and the Pauper (1881), Mark Twain	The Prince and the Pauper (2000)
The Prince and the Pauper (1881), Mark Twain	Barbie as the Princess and the Pauper (2004)
The Prince and the Pauper (1881), Mark Twain	The Prince and the Pauper (Bulgarian: Принцът и просякът, Printzat i prosyakat) (2005)
The Prince and the Pauper (1881), Mark Twain	The Prince and the Pauper: Double Trouble (2007)
The Prince and the Pauper (1881), Mark Twain	A Modern Twain Story: The Prince and the Pauper (2007)
The Princess and the Goblin (1872), George MacDonald	The Princess and the Goblin (1994)
"The Princess and the Pea" (Danish: Prinsessen paa Ærten), from Fairy Tales Told for Children. First Collection. First Booklet (Danish: Eventyr, fortalte for Børn. Første Samling. Første Hefte) (1835), Hans Christian Andersen	The Swineherd and the Princess on the Pea (Danish: Svinedrengen og prinsessen på ærten) (1962)
"The Princess and the Pea" (Danish: Prinsessen paa Ærten), from Fairy Tales Told for Children. First Collection. First Booklet (Danish: Eventyr, fortalte for Børn. Første Samling. Første Hefte) (1835), Hans Christian Andersen	The Princess and the Pea (2002)
The Princess Diaries (2000–2009) (series), Meg Cabot	The Princess Diaries (2002)
The Princess Diaries (2000–2009) (series), Meg Cabot	The Princess Diaries 2: Royal Engagement (2004)

== R ==
Children's book(s)	Film adaptation(s)
Raggedy Ann (1918–1975) (series) (Note: Elements adapted from the related works: Raggedy Ann Stories (1918), Raggedy Andy Stories (1920) and Raggedy Ann and Andy and the Camel with the Wrinkled Knees (1924) respectively.), Johnny Gruelle	Raggedy Ann & Andy: A Musical Adventure (1977)
The Railway Children (1906), E. Nesbit	The Railway Children (1970)
The Railway Children (1906), E. Nesbit	The Railway Children (2000)
The Railway Children (1906), E. Nesbit	The Railway Children Return (2022) (Note: Sequel to the 1970 film.)
The Railway Series (1945–1972) (series), Rev. W. Awdry
The Railway Series (1945–1972) (series), Rev. W. Awdry	Calling All Engines! (2005)
The Railway Series (1945–1972) (series), Rev. W. Awdry	The Great Discovery (2008)
The Railway Series (1945–1972) (series), Rev. W. Awdry	Hero of the Rails (2009)
The Railway Series (1945–1972) (series), Rev. W. Awdry	Misty Island Rescue (2010)
The Railway Series (1945–1972) (series), Rev. W. Awdry	Day of the Diesels (2011)
The Railway Series (1945–1972) (series), Rev. W. Awdry	Blue Mountain Mystery (2012)
The Railway Series (1945–1972) (series), Rev. W. Awdry	King of the Railway (2013)
The Railway Series (1945–1972) (series), Rev. W. Awdry	Tale of the Brave (2014)
The Railway Series (1945–1972) (series), Rev. W. Awdry	The Adventure Begins (2015)
The Railway Series (1945–1972) (series), Rev. W. Awdry	Sodor's Legend of the Lost Treasure (2015)
The Railway Series (1945–1972) (series), Rev. W. Awdry	The Great Race (2016)
The Railway Series (1945–1972) (series), Rev. W. Awdry	Journey Beyond Sodor (2017)
The Railway Series (1945–1972) (series), Rev. W. Awdry	Big World! Big Adventures! (2018)
The Railway Series (1945–1972) (series), Rev. W. Awdry	Race for the Sodor Cup (2021)
The Rainbow Fish (German: Der Regenbogenfisch) (1992), Marcus Pfister	The Rainbow Fish (2026)
Ramona (1950–1999) (series), Beverly Cleary	Ramona and Beezus (2010)
Rascal: A Memoir of a Better Era (1963), Sterling North	Rascal (1969)
A Rat's Tale (1986), Tor Seidler	A Rat's Tale (German: Die Story von Monty Spinnerratz) (1997)
Ready Player One (2011), Ernest Cline	Ready Player One (2018)
Rebecca of Sunnybrook Farm (1903), Kate Douglas Wiggin	Rebecca of Sunnybrook Farm (1917)
Rebecca of Sunnybrook Farm (1903), Kate Douglas Wiggin	Rebecca of Sunnybrook Farm (1932)
Rebecca of Sunnybrook Farm (1903), Kate Douglas Wiggin	Rebecca of Sunnybrook Farm (1938)
"The Red Shoes" (Danish: De røde sko), from New Fairy Tales. First Volume. Third Collection (Danish: Nye Eventyr. Første Bind. Tredie Samling) (1845), Hans Christian Andersen	The Red Shoes (1948)
"The Red Shoes" (Danish: De røde sko), from New Fairy Tales. First Volume. Third Collection (Danish: Nye Eventyr. Første Bind. Tredie Samling) (1845), Hans Christian Andersen	The World of Hans Christian Andersen (アンデルセン物語, Anderusen Monogatari) (1968)
"The Red Shoes" (Danish: De røde sko), from New Fairy Tales. First Volume. Third Collection (Danish: Nye Eventyr. Første Bind. Tredie Samling) (1845), Hans Christian Andersen	The Red Shoes (Korean: 분홍신; Hanja: 粉紅신; RR: Bunhongshin) (2005)
"The Reluctant Dragon", from Dream Days (1898), Kenneth Grahame	The Reluctant Dragon (1941)
The Rescuers (1959), Margery Sharp	The Rescuers (1977)
The Rescuers (1959), Margery Sharp	The Rescuers Down Under (1990)
Ricky Rapper (Finnish: Risto Räppääjä) (1997–2016) (series), Sinikka Nopola and Tiina Nopola	Ricky Rapper (2008)
Ricky Rapper (Finnish: Risto Räppääjä) (1997–2016) (series), Sinikka Nopola and Tiina Nopola	Ricky Rapper and the Bicycle Thief (2010)
Ricky Rapper (Finnish: Risto Räppääjä) (1997–2016) (series), Sinikka Nopola and Tiina Nopola	Ricky Rapper and Cool Wendy (2012)
Ricky Rapper (Finnish: Risto Räppääjä) (1997–2016) (series), Sinikka Nopola and Tiina Nopola	Ricky Rapper and Slick Leonard (2014)
Ricky Rapper (Finnish: Risto Räppääjä) (1997–2016) (series), Sinikka Nopola and Tiina Nopola	Ricky Rapper and the Miser from Seville (2015)
Ricky Rapper (Finnish: Risto Räppääjä) (1997–2016) (series), Sinikka Nopola and Tiina Nopola	Ricky Rapper and the Nighthawk (2016)
Ricky Rapper (Finnish: Risto Räppääjä) (1997–2016) (series), Sinikka Nopola and Tiina Nopola	Ricky Rapper and the Strongman (2019)
Ricky Rapper (Finnish: Risto Räppääjä) (1997–2016) (series), Sinikka Nopola and Tiina Nopola	Ricky Rapper and the Wrong Vincent (2020)
Ricky Rapper (Finnish: Risto Räppääjä) (1997–2016) (series), Sinikka Nopola and Tiina Nopola	Ricky Rapper and the Wild Machine (2023)
Ricky Rapper (Finnish: Risto Räppääjä) (1997–2016) (series), Sinikka Nopola and Tiina Nopola	Ricky Rapper and the Doppelganger (2025)
Ride a Northbound Horse (1964), Richard Wormser	Ride a Northbound Horse (1969)
A Ring of Endless Light (1980), Madeleine L'Engle	A Ring of Endless Light (2002)
Robinson Crusoe (1719), Daniel Defoe	Robinson Crusoe (1916)
Robinson Crusoe (1719), Daniel Defoe	The Adventures of Robinson Crusoe (1922) (Note: Serial film.)
Robinson Crusoe (1719), Daniel Defoe	The Adventures of Robinson Crusoe (French: Les aventures de Robinson Crusoë) (1922)
Robinson Crusoe (1719), Daniel Defoe	Robinson Crusoe (1924)
Robinson Crusoe (1719), Daniel Defoe	Robinson Crusoe (1927)
Robinson Crusoe (1719), Daniel Defoe	Robinson Crusoe (Russian: Робинзон Крузо) (1947)
Robinson Crusoe (1719), Daniel Defoe	Miss Robin Crusoe (1953)
Robinson Crusoe (1719), Daniel Defoe	Adventures of Robinson Crusoe (1954)
Robinson Crusoe (1719), Daniel Defoe	Il naufrago del Pacifico (1962)
Robinson Crusoe (1719), Daniel Defoe	Robinson Crusoe on Mars (1964)
Robinson Crusoe (1719), Daniel Defoe	Lt. Robin Crusoe, U.S.N. (1966)
Robinson Crusoe (1719), Daniel Defoe	Robinson Crusoe (1970)
Robinson Crusoe (1719), Daniel Defoe	Robinson Crusoe (1972)
Robinson Crusoe (1719), Daniel Defoe	Robinson Crusoe (Russian: Жизнь и удивительные приключения Робинзона Крузо) (1973)
Robinson Crusoe (1719), Daniel Defoe	Robinson y Viernes en la isla encantada (1973) (Note: Sequel to the 1970 film.)
Robinson Crusoe (1719), Daniel Defoe	Robinson Crusoe (Italian: Il racconto della giungla) (1974)
Robinson Crusoe (1719), Daniel Defoe	Man Friday (1975)
Robinson Crusoe (1719), Daniel Defoe	Robinson Crusoe Jr (1975)
Robinson Crusoe (1719), Daniel Defoe	The Erotic Adventures of Robinson Crusoe (1976)
Robinson Crusoe (1719), Daniel Defoe	Mr. Robinson (Italian: Il signor Robinson, mostruosa storia d'amore e d'avventure) (1976)
Robinson Crusoe (1719), Daniel Defoe	The Adventures of Robinson Crusoe (Portuguese: As Aventuras de Robinson Crusoé) (1978)
Robinson Crusoe (1719), Daniel Defoe	Adventures of Robinson Crusoe, a Sailor from York (Czech: Dobrodružství Robinsona Crusoe, námořníka z Yorku) (1982)
Robinson Crusoe (1719), Daniel Defoe	Crusoe (1988)
Robinson Crusoe (1719), Daniel Defoe	Robinson and Company (French: Robinson et compagnie) (1991)
Robinson Crusoe (1719), Daniel Defoe	Robinson Crusoe (1997)
Robinson Crusoe (1719), Daniel Defoe	Robinson Crusoe (Greek: Rovinsonas Krousos) (2004)
Robinson Crusoe (1719), Daniel Defoe	Robinson Crusoe on Sin Island (2005)
Robinson Crusoe (1719), Daniel Defoe	Robinson Crusoe: The Great Blitzkrieg (2008)
Robinson Crusoe (1719), Daniel Defoe	Robinson Crusoe & Cuma (2015)
Robinson Crusoe (1719), Daniel Defoe	Robinson Crusoe (2016)
Robot Dreams (2007), Sara Varon	Robot Dreams (2023)
Ronia, the Robber's Daughter (Swedish: Ronja rövardotter) (1981), Astrid Lindgren	Ronia, the Robber's Daughter (1984)
"Rumpelstiltskin" (German: Rumpelstilzchen), from Grimms' Fairy Tales (German: Kinder- und Hausmärchen, Children's and Household Tales) (1812), Brothers Grimm	Rumpelstiltskin (1915)
"Rumpelstiltskin" (German: Rumpelstilzchen), from Grimms' Fairy Tales (German: Kinder- und Hausmärchen, Children's and Household Tales) (1812), Brothers Grimm	Rumpelstiltskin (1940)
"Rumpelstiltskin" (German: Rumpelstilzchen), from Grimms' Fairy Tales (German: Kinder- und Hausmärchen, Children's and Household Tales) (1812), Brothers Grimm	Rumpelstiltskin (1955)
"Rumpelstiltskin" (German: Rumpelstilzchen), from Grimms' Fairy Tales (German: Kinder- und Hausmärchen, Children's and Household Tales) (1812), Brothers Grimm	The Dwarf Magician (German: Das Zaubermännchen) (1960)
"Rumpelstiltskin" (German: Rumpelstilzchen), from Grimms' Fairy Tales (German: Kinder- und Hausmärchen, Children's and Household Tales) (1812), Brothers Grimm	Rumpelstiltskin (1987)
"Rumpelstiltskin" (German: Rumpelstilzchen), from Grimms' Fairy Tales (German: Kinder- und Hausmärchen, Children's and Household Tales) (1812), Brothers Grimm	Muppet Classic Theater (1994)
"Rumpelstiltskin" (German: Rumpelstilzchen), from Grimms' Fairy Tales (German: Kinder- und Hausmärchen, Children's and Household Tales) (1812), Brothers Grimm	Rumpelstiltskin (1995)
"Rumpelstiltskin" (German: Rumpelstilzchen), from Grimms' Fairy Tales (German: Kinder- und Hausmärchen, Children's and Household Tales) (1812), Brothers Grimm	Rumpelstiltskin (2009)

== S ==
Children's book(s)	Film adaptation(s)
Santa Claus and the Magic Drum (Finnish: Joulupukki ja noitarumpu) (1995), Mauri Kunnas	Santa Claus and the Magic Drum (1996)
Satan from the Seventh Grade (Polish: Szatan z siódmej klasy) (1937), Kornel Makuszyński	Satan from the Seventh Grade (1960)
Satan from the Seventh Grade (Polish: Szatan z siódmej klasy) (1937), Kornel Makuszyński	Satan from the Seventh Grade (2006)
Searching for David's Heart (1998), Cherie Bennett	Searching for David's Heart (2004)
The Secret Garden (written 1910, published 1911), Frances Hodgson Burnett	The Secret Garden (1919)
The Secret Garden (written 1910, published 1911), Frances Hodgson Burnett	The Secret Garden (1949)
The Secret Garden (written 1910, published 1911), Frances Hodgson Burnett	The Secret Garden (1987)
The Secret Garden (written 1910, published 1911), Frances Hodgson Burnett	The Secret Garden (1993)
The Secret Garden (written 1910, published 1911), Frances Hodgson Burnett	The Secret Garden (1994)
The Secret Garden (written 1910, published 1911), Frances Hodgson Burnett	Return to the Secret Garden (2000)
The Secret Garden (written 1910, published 1911), Frances Hodgson Burnett	Back to the Secret Garden (2001)
The Secret Garden (written 1910, published 1911), Frances Hodgson Burnett	The Secret Garden (2020)
The Secrets of the Pirate Inn (1968), Wylly Folk St. John	Secrets of the Pirate's Inn (1969)
A Series of Unfortunate Events (1999—2006) (series), Lemony Snicket	Lemony Snicket's A Series of Unfortunate Events (2004)
"The Seven Ravens" (German: Die sieben Raben), from Grimms' Fairy Tales (German: Kinder- und Haus-Märchen. Bd. 1., Children's and Household Tales Volume 1) (1812), Brothers Grimm	The Seven Ravens (1937)
The Sheep-Pig (1983), Dick King-Smith	Babe (1995)
The Sheep-Pig (1983), Dick King-Smith	Babe: Pig in the City (1998)
"The Shepherdess and the Chimney Sweep" (Danish: Hyrdinden og Skorstensfejeren), from New Fairy Tales. First Volume. Third Collection (Danish: Nye Eventyr. Første Bind. Tredie Samling) (1845), Hans Christian Andersen	The King and the Mockingbird (French: Le Roi et l'Oiseau) (1980)
Shrek! (1990), William Steig	Shrek (2001)
Shrek! (1990), William Steig	Shrek 2 (2004)
Shrek! (1990), William Steig	Shrek the Third (2007)
Shrek! (1990), William Steig	Shrek Forever After (2010)
Shrek! (1990), William Steig	Puss in Boots (2011) (spin-off)
Shrek! (1990), William Steig	Puss in Boots: The Last Wish (2022) (spin-off)
Shrek! (1990), William Steig	Shrek 5 (2027)
Shrinking Violet (2009), Danielle Joseph	Radio Rebel (2012)
Simon vs. the Homo Sapiens Agenda (2015), Becky Albertalli	Love, Simon (2018)
The Sisterhood of the Traveling Pants (2001), Ann Brashares	The Sisterhood of the Traveling Pants (2005)
The Sisterhood of the Traveling Pants (2001), Ann Brashares	The Sisterhood of the Traveling Pants 2 (2008)
Skellig (1998), David Almond	Skellig (2009)
"The Snow Queen" (Danish: Snedronningen), from New Fairy Tales. First Volume. Second Collection (Danish: Nye Eventyr. Første Bind. Anden Samling) (1844), Hans Christian Andersen	The Snow Queen (Russian: Снежная королева) (1957)
"The Snow Queen" (Danish: Snedronningen), from New Fairy Tales. First Volume. Second Collection (Danish: Nye Eventyr. Første Bind. Anden Samling) (1844), Hans Christian Andersen	The Snow Queen (German: Die Schneekönigin) (1964)
"The Snow Queen" (Danish: Snedronningen), from New Fairy Tales. First Volume. Second Collection (Danish: Nye Eventyr. Første Bind. Anden Samling) (1844), Hans Christian Andersen	The Snow Queen (1967)
"The Snow Queen" (Danish: Snedronningen), from New Fairy Tales. First Volume. Second Collection (Danish: Nye Eventyr. Første Bind. Anden Samling) (1844), Hans Christian Andersen	The Snow Queen (1976)
"The Snow Queen" (Danish: Snedronningen), from New Fairy Tales. First Volume. Second Collection (Danish: Nye Eventyr. Første Bind. Anden Samling) (1844), Hans Christian Andersen	The Snow Queen (Finnish: Lumikuningatar) (1986)
"The Snow Queen" (Danish: Snedronningen), from New Fairy Tales. First Volume. Second Collection (Danish: Nye Eventyr. Første Bind. Anden Samling) (1844), Hans Christian Andersen	The Secret of the Snow Queen (Russian: Тайна Снежной королевы) (1987)
"The Snow Queen" (Danish: Snedronningen), from New Fairy Tales. First Volume. Second Collection (Danish: Nye Eventyr. Første Bind. Anden Samling) (1844), Hans Christian Andersen	The Snow Queen (1995)
"The Snow Queen" (Danish: Snedronningen), from New Fairy Tales. First Volume. Second Collection (Danish: Nye Eventyr. Første Bind. Anden Samling) (1844), Hans Christian Andersen	The Snow Queen's Revenge (1996)
"The Snow Queen" (Danish: Snedronningen), from New Fairy Tales. First Volume. Second Collection (Danish: Nye Eventyr. Første Bind. Anden Samling) (1844), Hans Christian Andersen	Snow Queen (2002)
"The Snow Queen" (Danish: Snedronningen), from New Fairy Tales. First Volume. Second Collection (Danish: Nye Eventyr. Første Bind. Anden Samling) (1844), Hans Christian Andersen	The Snow Queen (2005)
"The Snow Queen" (Danish: Snedronningen), from New Fairy Tales. First Volume. Second Collection (Danish: Nye Eventyr. Første Bind. Anden Samling) (1844), Hans Christian Andersen	The Snow Queen (Estonian: Lumekuninganna) (2010)
"The Snow Queen" (Danish: Snedronningen), from New Fairy Tales. First Volume. Second Collection (Danish: Nye Eventyr. Første Bind. Anden Samling) (1844), Hans Christian Andersen	The Snow Queen (2012)
"The Snow Queen" (Danish: Snedronningen), from New Fairy Tales. First Volume. Second Collection (Danish: Nye Eventyr. Første Bind. Anden Samling) (1844), Hans Christian Andersen	Frozen (2013)
"The Snow Queen" (Danish: Snedronningen), from New Fairy Tales. First Volume. Second Collection (Danish: Nye Eventyr. Første Bind. Anden Samling) (1844), Hans Christian Andersen	The Snow Queen 2 (2014)
"The Snow Queen" (Danish: Snedronningen), from New Fairy Tales. First Volume. Second Collection (Danish: Nye Eventyr. Første Bind. Anden Samling) (1844), Hans Christian Andersen	The Snow Queen (2014)
"The Snow Queen" (Danish: Snedronningen), from New Fairy Tales. First Volume. Second Collection (Danish: Nye Eventyr. Første Bind. Anden Samling) (1844), Hans Christian Andersen	The Mystery of Snow Queen (2015)
"The Snow Queen" (Danish: Snedronningen), from New Fairy Tales. First Volume. Second Collection (Danish: Nye Eventyr. Første Bind. Anden Samling) (1844), Hans Christian Andersen	The Snow Queen 3: Fire and Ice (2016)
"The Snow Queen" (Danish: Snedronningen), from New Fairy Tales. First Volume. Second Collection (Danish: Nye Eventyr. Første Bind. Anden Samling) (1844), Hans Christian Andersen	The Snow Queen: Mirrorlands (2018)
"The Snow Queen" (Danish: Snedronningen), from New Fairy Tales. First Volume. Second Collection (Danish: Nye Eventyr. Første Bind. Anden Samling) (1844), Hans Christian Andersen	Frozen 2 (2019)
"The Snow Queen" (Danish: Snedronningen), from New Fairy Tales. First Volume. Second Collection (Danish: Nye Eventyr. Første Bind. Anden Samling) (1844), Hans Christian Andersen	The Snow Queen and the Princess (2022)
"Snow White" (German: Schneewittchen), from Grimms' Fairy Tales (German: Kinder- und Haus-Märchen. Bd. 1., Children's and Household Tales Volume 1) (1812), Brothers Grimm	Snow White (1916)
"Snow White" (German: Schneewittchen), from Grimms' Fairy Tales (German: Kinder- und Haus-Märchen. Bd. 1., Children's and Household Tales Volume 1) (1812), Brothers Grimm	Snow White and the Seven Dwarfs (1937)
"Snow White" (German: Schneewittchen), from Grimms' Fairy Tales (German: Kinder- und Haus-Märchen. Bd. 1., Children's and Household Tales Volume 1) (1812), Brothers Grimm	The Seven Dwarfs to the Rescue (Italian: I sette nani alla riscossa) (1951)
"Snow White" (German: Schneewittchen), from Grimms' Fairy Tales (German: Kinder- und Haus-Märchen. Bd. 1., Children's and Household Tales Volume 1) (1812), Brothers Grimm	Snow White and the 7 Dudes (Finnish: Lumikki ja 7 jätkää) (1953)
"Snow White" (German: Schneewittchen), from Grimms' Fairy Tales (German: Kinder- und Haus-Märchen. Bd. 1., Children's and Household Tales Volume 1) (1812), Brothers Grimm	Snow White and the Seven Dwarfs (German: Schneewittchen und die 7 Zwerge) (1955)
"Snow White" (German: Schneewittchen), from Grimms' Fairy Tales (German: Kinder- und Haus-Märchen. Bd. 1., Children's and Household Tales Volume 1) (1812), Brothers Grimm	Snow White and the Three Stooges (1961)
"Snow White" (German: Schneewittchen), from Grimms' Fairy Tales (German: Kinder- und Haus-Märchen. Bd. 1., Children's and Household Tales Volume 1) (1812), Brothers Grimm	Snow White (German: Schneewittchen und die 7 Zwerge) (1961)
"Snow White" (German: Schneewittchen), from Grimms' Fairy Tales (German: Kinder- und Haus-Märchen. Bd. 1., Children's and Household Tales Volume 1) (1812), Brothers Grimm	The New Adventures of Snow White (German: Grimms Märchen von lüsternen Pärchen) (1969)
"Snow White" (German: Schneewittchen), from Grimms' Fairy Tales (German: Kinder- und Haus-Märchen. Bd. 1., Children's and Household Tales Volume 1) (1812), Brothers Grimm	Snow White and the Seven Dwarfs (Turkish: Pamuk Prenses ve 7 Cüceler) (1970)
"Snow White" (German: Schneewittchen), from Grimms' Fairy Tales (German: Kinder- und Haus-Märchen. Bd. 1., Children's and Household Tales Volume 1) (1812), Brothers Grimm	A Snow White Christmas (1980)
"Snow White" (German: Schneewittchen), from Grimms' Fairy Tales (German: Kinder- und Haus-Märchen. Bd. 1., Children's and Household Tales Volume 1) (1812), Brothers Grimm	Snow White (Hungarian: Hófehér) (1984)
"Snow White" (German: Schneewittchen), from Grimms' Fairy Tales (German: Kinder- und Haus-Märchen. Bd. 1., Children's and Household Tales Volume 1) (1812), Brothers Grimm	Snow White (1987)
"Snow White" (German: Schneewittchen), from Grimms' Fairy Tales (German: Kinder- und Haus-Märchen. Bd. 1., Children's and Household Tales Volume 1) (1812), Brothers Grimm	Happily Ever After (1989)
"Snow White" (German: Schneewittchen), from Grimms' Fairy Tales (German: Kinder- und Haus-Märchen. Bd. 1., Children's and Household Tales Volume 1) (1812), Brothers Grimm	Snow White and the Secret of the Dwarfs (German: Schneewittchen und das Geheimnis der Zwerge) (1992)
"Snow White" (German: Schneewittchen), from Grimms' Fairy Tales (German: Kinder- und Haus-Märchen. Bd. 1., Children's and Household Tales Volume 1) (1812), Brothers Grimm	Snow White (1995)
"Snow White" (German: Schneewittchen), from Grimms' Fairy Tales (German: Kinder- und Haus-Märchen. Bd. 1., Children's and Household Tales Volume 1) (1812), Brothers Grimm	Snow White and the Frog Prince (Chinese: 白雪公主與青蛙王子) (1996)
"Snow White" (German: Schneewittchen), from Grimms' Fairy Tales (German: Kinder- und Haus-Märchen. Bd. 1., Children's and Household Tales Volume 1) (1812), Brothers Grimm	Snow White: A Tale of Terror (1997)
"Snow White" (German: Schneewittchen), from Grimms' Fairy Tales (German: Kinder- und Haus-Märchen. Bd. 1., Children's and Household Tales Volume 1) (1812), Brothers Grimm	Snow White (1998)
"Snow White" (German: Schneewittchen), from Grimms' Fairy Tales (German: Kinder- und Haus-Märchen. Bd. 1., Children's and Household Tales Volume 1) (1812), Brothers Grimm	Snow White: The Fairest of Them All (2001)
"Snow White" (German: Schneewittchen), from Grimms' Fairy Tales (German: Kinder- und Haus-Märchen. Bd. 1., Children's and Household Tales Volume 1) (1812), Brothers Grimm	7 Dwarves – Men Alone in the Wood (German: 7 Zwerge – Männer allein im Wald) (2004)
"Snow White" (German: Schneewittchen), from Grimms' Fairy Tales (German: Kinder- und Haus-Märchen. Bd. 1., Children's and Household Tales Volume 1) (1812), Brothers Grimm	7 Dwarves: The Forest Is Not Enough (German: 7 Zwerge – Der Wald ist nicht genug) (2006)
"Snow White" (German: Schneewittchen), from Grimms' Fairy Tales (German: Kinder- und Haus-Märchen. Bd. 1., Children's and Household Tales Volume 1) (1812), Brothers Grimm	Snow White: The Sequel (French: Blanche-Neige, la suite) (2007)
"Snow White" (German: Schneewittchen), from Grimms' Fairy Tales (German: Kinder- und Haus-Märchen. Bd. 1., Children's and Household Tales Volume 1) (1812), Brothers Grimm	Sydney White (2007)
"Snow White" (German: Schneewittchen), from Grimms' Fairy Tales (German: Kinder- und Haus-Märchen. Bd. 1., Children's and Household Tales Volume 1) (1812), Brothers Grimm	Grimm's Snow White (2012)
"Snow White" (German: Schneewittchen), from Grimms' Fairy Tales (German: Kinder- und Haus-Märchen. Bd. 1., Children's and Household Tales Volume 1) (1812), Brothers Grimm	Mirror Mirror (2012)
"Snow White" (German: Schneewittchen), from Grimms' Fairy Tales (German: Kinder- und Haus-Märchen. Bd. 1., Children's and Household Tales Volume 1) (1812), Brothers Grimm	Snow White and the Huntsman (2012)
"Snow White" (German: Schneewittchen), from Grimms' Fairy Tales (German: Kinder- und Haus-Märchen. Bd. 1., Children's and Household Tales Volume 1) (1812), Brothers Grimm	Blancanieves (2012)
"Snow White" (German: Schneewittchen), from Grimms' Fairy Tales (German: Kinder- und Haus-Märchen. Bd. 1., Children's and Household Tales Volume 1) (1812), Brothers Grimm	Snow White: The Power of Dwarfs (Chinese: 白雪公主之矮人力量) (2014)
"Snow White" (German: Schneewittchen), from Grimms' Fairy Tales (German: Kinder- und Haus-Märchen. Bd. 1., Children's and Household Tales Volume 1) (1812), Brothers Grimm	The Seventh Dwarf (German: Der 7bte Zwerg) (2014)
"Snow White" (German: Schneewittchen), from Grimms' Fairy Tales (German: Kinder- und Haus-Märchen. Bd. 1., Children's and Household Tales Volume 1) (1812), Brothers Grimm	The Huntsman: Winter's War (2016)
"Snow White" (German: Schneewittchen), from Grimms' Fairy Tales (German: Kinder- und Haus-Märchen. Bd. 1., Children's and Household Tales Volume 1) (1812), Brothers Grimm	Red Shoes and the Seven Dwarfs (2019)
"Snow White" (German: Schneewittchen), from Grimms' Fairy Tales (German: Kinder- und Haus-Märchen. Bd. 1., Children's and Household Tales Volume 1) (1812), Brothers Grimm	Snow White's Christmas Adventure (2023)
"Snow White" (German: Schneewittchen), from Grimms' Fairy Tales (German: Kinder- und Haus-Märchen. Bd. 1., Children's and Household Tales Volume 1) (1812), Brothers Grimm	Snow White and the Seven Samurai (2024)
"Snow White" (German: Schneewittchen), from Grimms' Fairy Tales (German: Kinder- und Haus-Märchen. Bd. 1., Children's and Household Tales Volume 1) (1812), Brothers Grimm	Snow White (2025)
"Snow White" (German: Schneewittchen), from Grimms' Fairy Tales (German: Kinder- und Haus-Märchen. Bd. 1., Children's and Household Tales Volume 1) (1812), Brothers Grimm	Snow White and the 7 Dwarfs (2025)
Someone Like You (1998), Sarah Dessen	How to Deal (2003)
Something Wicked This Way Comes (1962), Ray Bradbury	Something Wicked This Way Comes (1972)
Something Wicked This Way Comes (1962), Ray Bradbury	Something Wicked This Way Comes (1983)
Sounder (1969), William H. Armstrong	Sounder (1972)
Sounder (1969), William H. Armstrong	Part 2, Sounder (1976)
Sounder (1969), William H. Armstrong	Sounder (2003)
Speak (1999), Laurie Halse Anderson	Speak (2004)
The Spectacular Now (2008), Tim Tharp	The Spectacular Now (2013)
The Spiderwick Chronicles (2003–2009) (series), Tony DiTerlizzi and Holly Black	The Spiderwick Chronicles (2008)
Stardust (1999), Neil Gaiman	Stardust (2007)
Stargirl (2000), Jerry Spinelli	Stargirl (2020)
Stargirl (2000), Jerry Spinelli	Hollywood Stargirl (2022)
Starik Hottabych (Russian: Старик Хоттабыч, Old Man Hottabych) (1937), Lazar Lagin	Old Khottabych (1956)
"The Steadfast Tin Soldier" (Danish: Den standhaftige tinsoldat), from Fairy Tales Told for Children. First Collection. First Booklet (Danish: Eventyr, fortalte for Børn. Ny Samling. Første Hefte) (1838), Hans Christian Andersen	The Tin Soldier (1992)
"The Steadfast Tin Soldier" (Danish: Den standhaftige tinsoldat), from Fairy Tales Told for Children. First Collection. First Booklet (Danish: Eventyr, fortalte for Børn. Ny Samling. Første Hefte) (1838), Hans Christian Andersen	The Tin Soldier (1995)
"The Steadfast Tin Soldier" (Danish: Den standhaftige tinsoldat), from Fairy Tales Told for Children. First Collection. First Booklet (Danish: Eventyr, fortalte for Børn. Ny Samling. Første Hefte) (1838), Hans Christian Andersen	Fantasia 2000 (1999)
Storm Boy (1964), Colin Thiele	Storm Boy (1976)
Stormbreaker (2000), Anthony Horowitz	Stormbreaker (2006)
"The Story of a Mother" (Danish: Historien om en moder), from New Fairy Tales. Second Volume. Second Collection (Danish: Nye Eventyr. Andet Bind. Anden Samling) (1848), Hans Christian Andersen	The Story of a Mother (1949)
"The Story of a Mother" (Danish: Historien om en moder), from New Fairy Tales. Second Volume. Second Collection (Danish: Nye Eventyr. Andet Bind. Anden Samling) (1848), Hans Christian Andersen	The Story of a Mother (1963)
"The Story of a Mother" (Danish: Historien om en moder), from New Fairy Tales. Second Volume. Second Collection (Danish: Nye Eventyr. Andet Bind. Anden Samling) (1848), Hans Christian Andersen	The Story of a Mother (1979)
The Story of Ferdinand (1936), Munro Leaf	Ferdinand (2017)
Stuart Little (1954), E. B. White	Stuart Little (1999)
Stuart Little (1954), E. B. White	Stuart Little 2 (2002)
Stuart Little (1954), E. B. White	Stuart Little 3: Call of the Wild (2006)
The Stupids (1974–1989) (series), Harry G. Allard and James Marshall	The Stupids (1996)
Swallows and Amazons (1930), Arthur Ransome	Swallows and Amazons (1974)
Swallows and Amazons (1930), Arthur Ransome	Swallows and Amazons (2016)
Swiftwater (1950), Paul Annixter	Those Calloways (1964)
Swindle (2008), Gordon Korman	Swindle (2013)
"The Swineherd" (Danish: Svinedrengen), from Fairy Tales Told for Children. New Collection. Third Booklet (Danish: Eventyr, fortalte for Børn. Ny Samling. Tredie Hefte) (1841), Hans Christian Andersen	The Swineherd and the Princess on the Pea (Danish: Svinedrengen og prinsessen på ærten) (1962)
The Sword in the Stone (1938), T. H. White	The Sword in the Stone (1963)

== T ==
Children's book(s)	Film adaptation(s)
The Tale of Despereaux (2003), Kate Dicamillo	The Tale of Despereaux (2008)
The Tale of Peter Rabbit (1901), Beatrix Potter	The Tales of Beatrix Potter (1971)
The Tale of Peter Rabbit (1901), Beatrix Potter	The New Adventures of Peter Rabbit (1995)
The Tale of Peter Rabbit (1901), Beatrix Potter	Peter Rabbit (2018)
The Tale of Peter Rabbit (1901), Beatrix Potter	Peter Rabbit 2: The Runaway (2021)
A Tale of Two Cities (1859), Charles Dickens	A Tale of Two Cities (1917)
A Tale of Two Cities (1859), Charles Dickens	A Tale of Two Cities (1922)
A Tale of Two Cities (1859), Charles Dickens	The Only Way (1927)
A Tale of Two Cities (1859), Charles Dickens	A Tale of Two Cities (1935)
A Tale of Two Cities (1859), Charles Dickens	A Tale of Two Cities (1958)
A Tale of Two Cities (1859), Charles Dickens	A Tale of Two Cities (1980)
A Tale of Two Cities (1859), Charles Dickens	A Tale of Two Cities (1984)
That Christmas and Other Stories (2012-2020) (trilogy), Richard Curtis and Rebecca Cobb	That Christmas (2024)
That Summer (1996), Sarah Dessen	How to Deal (2003)
Thelma the Unicorn (2015), Aaron Blabey	Thelma the Unicorn (2024)
Thomasina, the Cat Who Thought She Was God (1957), Paul Gallico	The Three Lives of Thomasina (1964)
The Three Investigators (1964–1987) (American series), Robert Arthur Jr.	Die drei ??? – Das Geheimnis der Geisterinsel (2007)
The Three Investigators (1964–1987) (American series), Robert Arthur Jr.	Die drei ??? – Das verfluchte Schloss (2009)
The Three Investigators (1964–1987) (American series), Robert Arthur Jr.	Die drei ??? und der Karpatenhund (2025)
The Three Investigators: Island of Death (2001), André Marx	Die drei ??? – Toteninsel (2026)
The Three Musketeers (French: Les Trois Mousquetaires) (1844), Alexandre Dumas, père
The Three Musketeers (French: Les Trois Mousquetaires) (1844), Alexandre Dumas, père	The Three Musketeers (1914)
The Three Musketeers (French: Les Trois Mousquetaires) (1844), Alexandre Dumas, père	The Three Musketeers (1916)
The Three Musketeers (French: Les Trois Mousquetaires) (1844), Alexandre Dumas, père	The Three Musketeers (1921; French)
The Three Musketeers (French: Les Trois Mousquetaires) (1844), Alexandre Dumas, père	The Three Musketeers (1921; American)
The Three Musketeers (French: Les Trois Mousquetaires) (1844), Alexandre Dumas, père	The Three Musketeers (1932)
The Three Musketeers (French: Les Trois Mousquetaires) (1844), Alexandre Dumas, père	The Three Musketeers (1933)
The Three Musketeers (French: Les Trois Mousquetaires) (1844), Alexandre Dumas, père	The Three Musketeers (1935)
The Three Musketeers (French: Les Trois Mousquetaires) (1844), Alexandre Dumas, père	The Three Musketeers (1939)
The Three Musketeers (French: Les Trois Mousquetaires) (1844), Alexandre Dumas, père	The Three Musketeers (1948)
The Three Musketeers (French: Les Trois Mousquetaires) (1844), Alexandre Dumas, père	At Sword's Point (1952)
The Three Musketeers (French: Les Trois Mousquetaires) (1844), Alexandre Dumas, père	The Three Musketeers (1953)
The Three Musketeers (French: Les Trois Mousquetaires) (1844), Alexandre Dumas, père	Three and a Half Musketeers (Spanish: Los tres mosqueteros y medio) (1957)
The Three Musketeers (French: Les Trois Mousquetaires) (1844), Alexandre Dumas, père	The Three Musketeers (1961) (Note: Originally released in two parts: The Queen's Diamonds and The Vengeance of Milady.)
The Three Musketeers (French: Les Trois Mousquetaires) (1844), Alexandre Dumas, père	Zorro and the Three Musketeers (Italian: Zorro e i tre moschettieri) (1963)
The Three Musketeers (French: Les Trois Mousquetaires) (1844), Alexandre Dumas, père	The Three Musketeers (1969)
The Three Musketeers (French: Les Trois Mousquetaires) (1844), Alexandre Dumas, père	The Three Musketeers in Boots (1972)
The Three Musketeers (French: Les Trois Mousquetaires) (1844), Alexandre Dumas, père	The Three Musketeers (1973)
The Three Musketeers (French: Les Trois Mousquetaires) (1844), Alexandre Dumas, père	The Three Musketeers (1973)
The Three Musketeers (French: Les Trois Mousquetaires) (1844), Alexandre Dumas, père	The Four Charlots Musketeers (French: Les Quatre Charlots mousquetaires) (1974)
The Three Musketeers (French: Les Trois Mousquetaires) (1844), Alexandre Dumas, père	The Four Charlots Musketeers 2 (French: À nous quatre, Cardinal!) (1974)
The Three Musketeers (French: Les Trois Mousquetaires) (1844), Alexandre Dumas, père	The Three Musketeers (1974)
The Three Musketeers (French: Les Trois Mousquetaires) (1844), Alexandre Dumas, père	The Four Musketeers (1974)
The Three Musketeers (French: Les Trois Mousquetaires) (1844), Alexandre Dumas, père	d'Artagnan and Three Musketeers (1978)
The Three Musketeers (French: Les Trois Mousquetaires) (1844), Alexandre Dumas, père	The Three Musketeers (1986)
The Three Musketeers (French: Les Trois Mousquetaires) (1844), Alexandre Dumas, père	The Three Mouseketeers (Romanian: Uimitoarele aventuri ale muschetarilor) (1988)
The Three Musketeers (French: Les Trois Mousquetaires) (1844), Alexandre Dumas, père	The Three Musketeers Anime: Aramis' Adventure (アニメ三銃士 アラミスの冒険, Anime Sanjūshi: Aramisu no Bōken) (1989)
The Three Musketeers (French: Les Trois Mousquetaires) (1844), Alexandre Dumas, père	Kero Kero Keroppi's Three Musketeers (けろけろけろっぴの三銃士, Kero Kero Keroppi no Sanjūshi) (1991)
The Three Musketeers (French: Les Trois Mousquetaires) (1844), Alexandre Dumas, père	The Three Musketeers (1992)
The Three Musketeers (French: Les Trois Mousquetaires) (1844), Alexandre Dumas, père	Ring of the Musketeers (1992)
The Three Musketeers (French: Les Trois Mousquetaires) (1844), Alexandre Dumas, père	The Three Musketeers (1993)
The Three Musketeers (French: Les Trois Mousquetaires) (1844), Alexandre Dumas, père	Revenge of the Musketeers (French: La fille de d'Artagnan) (1994)
The Three Musketeers (French: Les Trois Mousquetaires) (1844), Alexandre Dumas, père	The Musketeer (2001)
The Three Musketeers (French: Les Trois Mousquetaires) (1844), Alexandre Dumas, père	Mickey, Donald, Goofy: The Three Musketeers (2004)
The Three Musketeers (French: Les Trois Mousquetaires) (1844), Alexandre Dumas, père	La Femme Musketeer (2004)
The Three Musketeers (French: Les Trois Mousquetaires) (1844), Alexandre Dumas, père	The Three Musketeers: Saving the Crown (2007)
The Three Musketeers (French: Les Trois Mousquetaires) (1844), Alexandre Dumas, père	Barbie and the Three Musketeers (2009)
The Three Musketeers (French: Les Trois Mousquetaires) (1844), Alexandre Dumas, père	The Three Musketeers (2011)
The Three Musketeers (French: Les Trois Mousquetaires) (1844), Alexandre Dumas, père	3 Musketeers (2011)
The Three Musketeers (French: Les Trois Mousquetaires) (1844), Alexandre Dumas, père	The Three Musketeers (Russian: Три мушкетёра, Tri mushketera) (2013)
The Three Musketeers (French: Les Trois Mousquetaires) (1844), Alexandre Dumas, père	Dogtanian and the Three Muskehounds (Spanish: D'Artacán y los Tres Mosqueperros) (2021)
The Three Musketeers (French: Les Trois Mousquetaires) (1844), Alexandre Dumas, père	The Three Musketeers: D'Artagnan (2023)
The Three Musketeers (French: Les Trois Mousquetaires) (1844), Alexandre Dumas, père	The Three Musketeers: Milady (2023)
Through the Looking-Glass, and What Alice Found There (1871), Lewis Carroll	The Adventures of Alice (1960) An adaptation of Alice's Adventures in Wonderland and Through the Looking-Glass
Through the Looking-Glass, and What Alice Found There (1871), Lewis Carroll	Alice Through the Looking Glass (1966)
Through the Looking-Glass, and What Alice Found There (1871), Lewis Carroll	Alice Through the Looking Glass (1974)
Through the Looking-Glass, and What Alice Found There (1871), Lewis Carroll	Jabberwocky (1977)
Through the Looking-Glass, and What Alice Found There (1871), Lewis Carroll	Alice Through the Looking Glass (1987)
Through the Looking-Glass, and What Alice Found There (1871), Lewis Carroll	Alice Through the Looking Glass (1998)
Through the Looking-Glass, and What Alice Found There (1871), Lewis Carroll	Alice Through the Looking Glass (2016)
"Thumbelina" (Danish: Tommelise), from Fairy Tales Told for Children. First Collection. Second Booklet. 1835. (Danish: Eventyr, fortalte for Børn. Første Samling. Andet Hefte. 1835.) (1835), Hans Christian Andersen	Thumbelina (1970)
"Thumbelina" (Danish: Tommelise), from Fairy Tales Told for Children. First Collection. Second Booklet. 1835. (Danish: Eventyr, fortalte for Børn. Første Samling. Andet Hefte. 1835.) (1835), Hans Christian Andersen	Thumbelina (Japanese: 世界名作童話 おやゆび姫, Sekai Meisaku Dōwa: Oyayubi Hime) (1978)
"Thumbelina" (Danish: Tommelise), from Fairy Tales Told for Children. First Collection. Second Booklet. 1835. (Danish: Eventyr, fortalte for Børn. Første Samling. Andet Hefte. 1835.) (1835), Hans Christian Andersen	Hello Kitty's Thumbelina (ハローキティのおやゆびひめ, Hello Kitty no Oyayubi Hime) (1990)
"Thumbelina" (Danish: Tommelise), from Fairy Tales Told for Children. First Collection. Second Booklet. 1835. (Danish: Eventyr, fortalte for Børn. Første Samling. Andet Hefte. 1835.) (1835), Hans Christian Andersen	Thumbelina (1992)
"Thumbelina" (Danish: Tommelise), from Fairy Tales Told for Children. First Collection. Second Booklet. 1835. (Danish: Eventyr, fortalte for Børn. Første Samling. Andet Hefte. 1835.) (1835), Hans Christian Andersen	Thumbelina (1993)
"Thumbelina" (Danish: Tommelise), from Fairy Tales Told for Children. First Collection. Second Booklet. 1835. (Danish: Eventyr, fortalte for Børn. Første Samling. Andet Hefte. 1835.) (1835), Hans Christian Andersen	Thumbelina (1994)
"Thumbelina" (Danish: Tommelise), from Fairy Tales Told for Children. First Collection. Second Booklet. 1835. (Danish: Eventyr, fortalte for Børn. Første Samling. Andet Hefte. 1835.) (1835), Hans Christian Andersen	Tom Thumb Meets Thumbelina (1996)
"Thumbelina" (Danish: Tommelise), from Fairy Tales Told for Children. First Collection. Second Booklet. 1835. (Danish: Eventyr, fortalte for Børn. Første Samling. Andet Hefte. 1835.) (1835), Hans Christian Andersen	The Adventures of Tom Thumb and Thumbelina (2002)
"Thumbelina" (Danish: Tommelise), from Fairy Tales Told for Children. First Collection. Second Booklet. 1835. (Danish: Eventyr, fortalte for Børn. Første Samling. Andet Hefte. 1835.) (1835), Hans Christian Andersen	Barbie: Thumbelina (2009)
Thunderhead (1943), Mary O'Hara	Thunderhead, Son of Flicka (1945)
Tiger Eyes (1981), Judy Blume	Tiger Eyes (2013)
A Tiger Walks (1960), Ian Niall	A Tiger Walks (1964)
The Tiger's Apprentice (2003), Laurence Yep	The Tiger's Apprentice (2024)
Timmy Failure: Mistakes Were Made (2013), Stephan Pastis	Timmy Failure: Mistakes Were Made (2020)
"The Tinderbox" (Danish: Fyrtøjet), from Fairy Tales Told for Children. First Collection. First Booklet (Danish: Eventyr, fortalte for Børn. Første Samling. Første Hefte) (1835), Hans Christian Andersen	The Tinderbox (1946)
"The Tinderbox" (Danish: Fyrtøjet), from Fairy Tales Told for Children. First Collection. First Booklet (Danish: Eventyr, fortalte for Børn. Første Samling. Første Hefte) (1835), Hans Christian Andersen	The Tinder Box (German: Das Feuerzeug) (1959)
"The Tinderbox" (Danish: Fyrtøjet), from Fairy Tales Told for Children. First Collection. First Booklet (Danish: Eventyr, fortalte for Børn. Første Samling. Første Hefte) (1835), Hans Christian Andersen	Ginger's Tale (Russian: Огонёк-Огниво, romanized: Ogonyok-Ognivo) (2020)
Tistou of the Green Thumbs (French: Tistou les pouces verts) (1957), Maurice Druon	Tistou the Green Thumb (チスト みどりのおやゆび, Tistou Midori no Oyayubi) (1990)
TKKG (1979–2011) (series), Stefan Wolf	Ein Fall für TKKG – Drachenauge (1995)
TKKG (1979–2011) (series), Stefan Wolf	TKKG: The Secret of the Mysterious Mind Machine (2006)
TKKG (1979–2011) (series), Stefan Wolf	TKKG (2019)
Toby Tyler; or, Ten Weeks with a Circus (serialised 1877, published as a book 1881), James Otis Kaler (as James Otis)	Toby Tyler (1960)
"Town Musicians of Bremen" (German: Die Bremer Stadtmusikanten), from Grimms' Fairy Tales (German: Kinder- und Haus-Märchen. Bd. 1., Children's and Household Tales Volume 1) (1812), Brothers Grimm	Bremen 4: Angels in Hell (Japanese: ブレーメン4 地獄の中の天使たち, romanized: Bremen 4: Jigoku no Naka no Tenshi-tachi) (1981)
"Town Musicians of Bremen" (German: Die Bremer Stadtmusikanten), from Grimms' Fairy Tales (German: Kinder- und Haus-Märchen. Bd. 1., Children's and Household Tales Volume 1) (1812), Brothers Grimm	The Four Musicians of Bremen (Spanish: Los Cuatro Músicos de Bremen) (1989)
"Town Musicians of Bremen" (German: Die Bremer Stadtmusikanten), from Grimms' Fairy Tales (German: Kinder- und Haus-Märchen. Bd. 1., Children's and Household Tales Volume 1) (1812), Brothers Grimm	The Fearless Four (1997)
"Town Musicians of Bremen" (German: Die Bremer Stadtmusikanten), from Grimms' Fairy Tales (German: Kinder- und Haus-Märchen. Bd. 1., Children's and Household Tales Volume 1) (1812), Brothers Grimm	The Bremen Town Musicians (2023)
Treasure Island (1883), Robert Louis Stevenson	Treasure Island (1918)
Treasure Island (1883), Robert Louis Stevenson	Treasure Island (1920)
Treasure Island (1883), Robert Louis Stevenson	Treasure Island (1934)
Treasure Island (1883), Robert Louis Stevenson	Treasure Island (1937)
Treasure Island (1883), Robert Louis Stevenson	Treasure Island (1950)
Treasure Island (1883), Robert Louis Stevenson	Long John Silver (1954)
Treasure Island (1883), Robert Louis Stevenson	Return to Treasure Island (1954)
Treasure Island (1883), Robert Louis Stevenson	Treasure Island (1971)
Treasure Island (1883), Robert Louis Stevenson	Animal Treasure Island (1971)
Treasure Island (1883), Robert Louis Stevenson	Treasure Island (1972; animated)
Treasure Island (1883), Robert Louis Stevenson	Treasure Island (1972; live-action)
Treasure Island (1883), Robert Louis Stevenson	Treasure Island (1982)
Treasure Island (1883), Robert Louis Stevenson	Treasure Island (French: L'Île au trésor) (1985)
Treasure Island (1883), Robert Louis Stevenson	Treasure Island (1987)
Treasure Island (1883), Robert Louis Stevenson	Treasure Island (1988)
Treasure Island (1883), Robert Louis Stevenson	Treasure Island (1990)
Treasure Island (1883), Robert Louis Stevenson	Treasure Island (1995)
Treasure Island (1883), Robert Louis Stevenson	Muppet Treasure Island (1996)
Treasure Island (1883), Robert Louis Stevenson	Treasure Island (1996)
Treasure Island (1883), Robert Louis Stevenson	Return to Treasure Island (1998)
Treasure Island (1883), Robert Louis Stevenson	Treasure Island (1999)
Treasure Island (1883), Robert Louis Stevenson	Treasure Planet (2002)
Treasure Island (1883), Robert Louis Stevenson	Pirates of Treasure Island (2006)
Treasure Island (1883), Robert Louis Stevenson	Treasure Island (German: L'Île aux trésors (2007)
Treasure Island (1883), Robert Louis Stevenson	Treasure Island (German: Die Schatzinsel) (2007)
The True Meaning of Smekday (2007), Adam Rex	Home (2015)
The Trumpet of the Swan (1970), E. B. White	The Trumpet of the Swan (2001)
Tuck Everlasting (1975), Natalie Babbitt	Tuck Everlasting (1981)
Tuck Everlasting (1975), Natalie Babbitt	Tuck Everlasting (2002)
Twenty Thousand Leagues Under the Seas (French: Vingt mille lieues sous les mers) (1870), Jules Verne	20,000 Leagues Under the Sea (1916)
Twenty Thousand Leagues Under the Seas (French: Vingt mille lieues sous les mers) (1870), Jules Verne	20,000 Leagues Under the Sea (1954)
Twenty Thousand Leagues Under the Seas (French: Vingt mille lieues sous les mers) (1870), Jules Verne	Captain Nemo and the Underwater City (1969)
Twenty Thousand Leagues Under the Seas (French: Vingt mille lieues sous les mers) (1870), Jules Verne	Twenty Thousand Leagues Under The Sea (1973)
Twenty Thousand Leagues Under the Seas (French: Vingt mille lieues sous les mers) (1870), Jules Verne	The Amazing Captain Nemo (1978)
Twenty Thousand Leagues Under the Seas (French: Vingt mille lieues sous les mers) (1870), Jules Verne	The Black Hole (1979)
Twenty Thousand Leagues Under the Seas (French: Vingt mille lieues sous les mers) (1870), Jules Verne	20,000 Leagues Under the Sea (1985)
Twenty Thousand Leagues Under the Seas (French: Vingt mille lieues sous les mers) (1870), Jules Verne	20,000 Leagues Under the Sea (1997)
Twenty Thousand Leagues Under the Seas (French: Vingt mille lieues sous les mers) (1870), Jules Verne	Crayola Kids Adventures: 20,000 Leagues Under the Sea (1997)
Twenty Thousand Leagues Under the Seas (French: Vingt mille lieues sous les mers) (1870), Jules Verne	20,000 Leagues Under the Sea (2002)
Twenty Thousand Leagues Under the Seas (French: Vingt mille lieues sous les mers) (1870), Jules Verne	30,000 Leagues Under the Sea (2007)
Twenty Years After (French: Vingt ans après) (1845), Alexandre Dumas, père	The Return of the Musketeers (1989)
Twitches (2002–2004) (series), H. B. Gilmour and Randi Reisfeld	Twitches (2005)
Twitches (2002–2004) (series), H. B. Gilmour and Randi Reisfeld	Twitches Too (2007)
The Twits (1980), Roald Dahl	The Twits (2025)
The Two Who Stole the Moon (Polish: O dwóch takich, co ukradli księżyc) (1928), Kornel Makuszyński	The Two Who Stole the Moon (1962)

== U ==
Children's book(s)	Film adaptation(s)
The Ugly Dachshund (1938), Gladys Bronwyn Stern	The Ugly Dachshund (1966)
"The Ugly Duckling" (Danish: Den grimme ælling), from New Fairy Tales. First Volume. First Collection (Danish: Nye Eventyr. Første Bind. Første Samling) (1843), Hans Christian Andersen	The Ugly Duckling (1997)
"The Ugly Duckling" (Danish: Den grimme ælling), from New Fairy Tales. First Volume. First Collection (Danish: Nye Eventyr. Første Bind. Første Samling) (1843), Hans Christian Andersen	The Ugly Duckling and Me! (Danish: Den grimme ælling og mig) (2006)
Uncle Remus (1881), Joel Chandler Harris	Song of the South (1946)
Uncle Remus (1881), Joel Chandler Harris	Coonskin (1975)
Uncle Remus (1881), Joel Chandler Harris	The Adventures of Brer Rabbit (2006)
Undercover Cat (1963), Gordon Gordon and Mildred Gordon	That Darn Cat! (1965)
Undercover Cat (1963), Gordon Gordon and Mildred Gordon	That Darn Cat (1997)
Urmel from the Ice Age (1969), Max Kruse	Impy's Island (2006)
Ushiro no Shōmen Daare (うしろの正面だあれ) (1985), Kayoko Ebina	Who's Left Behind? (a. k. a. Kayoko's Diary) (1991)

== V ==
Children's book(s)	Film adaptation(s)
Vampire Academy (2007), Richelle Mead	Vampire Academy (2014)
Vampire Blood (2000) (series) (Note: Part of The Saga of Darren Shan series; first published as three separate works: Cirque du Freak, The Vampire's Assistant and Tunnels of Blood (all 2000) respectively.), Darren Shan	Cirque du Freak: The Vampire's Assistant (2009)
The Velveteen Rabbit (1922), Margery Williams	The Velveteen Rabbit (2009)
Vicke Viking (1963), Runer Jonsson	Vicky the Viking (2009)
The Vicomte of Bragelonne: Ten Years Later (French: Le Vicomte de Bragelonne ou Dix ans plus tard) (1847–1850), Alexandre Dumas, père	The Man in the Iron Mask (1923)
The Vicomte of Bragelonne: Ten Years Later (French: Le Vicomte de Bragelonne ou Dix ans plus tard) (1847–1850), Alexandre Dumas, père	The Iron Mask (1929)
The Vicomte of Bragelonne: Ten Years Later (French: Le Vicomte de Bragelonne ou Dix ans plus tard) (1847–1850), Alexandre Dumas, père	The Man in the Iron Mask (1939)
The Vicomte of Bragelonne: Ten Years Later (French: Le Vicomte de Bragelonne ou Dix ans plus tard) (1847–1850), Alexandre Dumas, père	Lady in the Iron Mask (1952)
The Vicomte of Bragelonne: Ten Years Later (French: Le Vicomte de Bragelonne ou Dix ans plus tard) (1847–1850), Alexandre Dumas, père	The King's Prisoner (Italian: Il prigioniero del re) (1954)
The Vicomte of Bragelonne: Ten Years Later (French: Le Vicomte de Bragelonne ou Dix ans plus tard) (1847–1850), Alexandre Dumas, père	The Count of Bragelonne (Italian: Il Visconte di Bragelonne) (1954)
The Vicomte of Bragelonne: Ten Years Later (French: Le Vicomte de Bragelonne ou Dix ans plus tard) (1847–1850), Alexandre Dumas, père	The Iron Mask (French: Le Masque de fer) (1962)
The Vicomte of Bragelonne: Ten Years Later (French: Le Vicomte de Bragelonne ou Dix ans plus tard) (1847–1850), Alexandre Dumas, père	The Man in the Iron Mask (1977)
The Vicomte of Bragelonne: Ten Years Later (French: Le Vicomte de Bragelonne ou Dix ans plus tard) (1847–1850), Alexandre Dumas, père	The Fifth Musketeer (1979)
The Vicomte of Bragelonne: Ten Years Later (French: Le Vicomte de Bragelonne ou Dix ans plus tard) (1847–1850), Alexandre Dumas, père	The Man in the Iron Mask (1985)
The Vicomte of Bragelonne: Ten Years Later (French: Le Vicomte de Bragelonne ou Dix ans plus tard) (1847–1850), Alexandre Dumas, père	The Man in the Iron Mask (1998) (Note: Directed by Randall Wallace.)
The Vicomte of Bragelonne: Ten Years Later (French: Le Vicomte de Bragelonne ou Dix ans plus tard) (1847–1850), Alexandre Dumas, père	The Man in the Iron Mask (1998) (Note: Directed by William Richert and featuring Richert as Count Aramis.)
Vorstadtkrokodile (1976), Max von der Grün	Die Vorstadtkrokodile (1977)
Vorstadtkrokodile (1976), Max von der Grün	Vorstadtkrokodile (2009)
Vorstadtkrokodile (1976), Max von der Grün	Vorstadtkrokodile 2 (2010)
Vorstadtkrokodile (1976), Max von der Grün	Vorstadtkrokodile 3 (2011)

== W ==
Children's book(s)	Film adaptation(s)
War Horse (1982), Michael Morpurgo	War Horse (2011)
War of the Buttons (French: La Guerre des boutons) (1912), Louis Pergaud	War of the Buttons (1962)
War of the Buttons (French: La Guerre des boutons) (1912), Louis Pergaud	War of the Buttons (1994)
The War with Grandpa (1987), Robert Kimmel Smith	The War with Grandpa (2020)
A Watcher in the Woods (1976), Florence Engel Randall	The Watcher in the Woods (1980)
A Watcher in the Woods (1976), Florence Engel Randall	The Watcher in the Woods (2017)
The Water-Babies, A Fairy Tale for a Land Baby (serialised 1862—1863, published as a book 1863), Charles Kingsley	The Water Babies (1978)
The Water Horse (1990), Dick King-Smith	The Water Horse: Legend of the Deep (2007)
Watership Down (1972), Richard Adams	Watership Down (1978)
Way Down Cellar (1942), Phil Stong	Way Down Cellar (1968)
The Wave (1981), Todd Strasser	The Wave (German: Die Welle) (2008)
We're Back! A Dinosaur's Story (1987), Hudson Talbott	We're Back! A Dinosaur's Story (1993)
The Westing Game (1978), Ellen Raskin	Get a Clue (1997)
When Knighthood Was in Flower (1898), Charles Major	When Knights Were Bold (1908)
When Knighthood Was in Flower (1898), Charles Major	When Knighthood Was in Flower (1922)
When Knighthood Was in Flower (1898), Charles Major	The Sword and the Rose (1953)
When Marnie Was There (1967), Joan G. Robinson	When Marnie Was There (2014)
When the Wind Blows (1982), Raymond Briggs	When the Wind Blows (1986)
Where the Red Fern Grows (1961), Wilson Rawls	Where the Red Fern Grows (1974)
Where the Red Fern Grows (1961), Wilson Rawls	Where the Red Fern Grows: Part Two (1992)
Where the Red Fern Grows (1961), Wilson Rawls	Where the Red Fern Grows (2003)
Where the Wild Things Are (1963), Maurice Sendak	Where the Wild Things Are (2009)
White Fang (1906), Jack London	White Fang (1925)
White Fang (1906), Jack London	White Fang (1936)
White Fang (1906), Jack London	White Fang (1946)
White Fang (1906), Jack London	White Fang (Italian: Zanna Bianca) (1973)
White Fang (1906), Jack London	The Sons of White Fang (Italian: I figli di Zanna Bianca) (1974)
White Fang (1906), Jack London	Challenge to White Fang (Italian: Il ritorno di Zanna Bianca) (1974)
White Fang (1906), Jack London	White Fang to the Rescue (Italian: Zanna Bianca alla riscossa) (1974)
White Fang (1906), Jack London	White Fang and the Gold Diggers (Italian: La spacconata) (1974)
White Fang (1906), Jack London	White Fang and the Hunter (Italian: Zanna Bianca e il cacciatore solitario) (1975)
White Fang (1906), Jack London	White Fang and the Magnificent Kid (Italian: Zanna Bianca e il grande Kid) (1977)
White Fang (1906), Jack London	White Fang (1991)
White Fang (1906), Jack London	White Fang (1991)
White Fang (1906), Jack London	White Fang 2: Myth of the White Wolf (1994)
White Fang (1906), Jack London	White Fang (1997)
White Fang (1906), Jack London	White Fang (French: Croc-Blanc) (2018)
Who Censored Roger Rabbit? (1981), Gary K. Wolf	Who Framed Roger Rabbit (1988)
Wild Chicks (1993–2003) (series), Cornelia Funke	Wild Chicks (2006)
Wild Chicks (1993–2003) (series), Cornelia Funke	Wild Chicks in Love (2007)
Wild Chicks (1993–2003) (series), Cornelia Funke	The Wild Chicks and Life (2009)
The Wild Robot (2016), Peter Brown	The Wild Robot (2024)
The Wild Soccer Bunch (German: Die wilden Kerle) (2002-2005) (series), Joachim Masannek	Die Wilden Kerle: Alles ist gut, solange du wild bist! (2003)
The Wild Soccer Bunch (German: Die wilden Kerle) (2002-2005) (series), Joachim Masannek	Die Wilden Kerle 2 (2005)
The Wild Soccer Bunch (German: Die wilden Kerle) (2002-2005) (series), Joachim Masannek	Die Wilden Kerle 3 (2006)
The Wild Soccer Bunch (German: Die wilden Kerle) (2002-2005) (series), Joachim Masannek	Die Wilden Kerle 4 (2007)
The Wild Soccer Bunch (German: Die wilden Kerle) (2002-2005) (series), Joachim Masannek	Die Wilden Kerle 5 (2008)
The Wild Soccer Bunch (German: Die wilden Kerle) (2002-2005) (series), Joachim Masannek	Die Wilden Kerle – Die Legende lebt! (2016)
"The Wild Swans" (Danish: De vilde svaner), from Fairy Tales Told for Children. New Collection. First Booklet (Danish: Eventyr, fortalte for Børn. Ny Samling. Første Hefte) (1838), Hans Christian Andersen	The Wild Swans (Russian: Дикие лебеди, Dikiye lebedi) (1962)
"The Wild Swans" (Danish: De vilde svaner), from Fairy Tales Told for Children. New Collection. First Booklet (Danish: Eventyr, fortalte for Børn. Ny Samling. Første Hefte) (1838), Hans Christian Andersen	The Wild Swans (Japanese: 世界名作童話 白鳥の王子, Sekai Meisaku Dōwa: Hakuchō no Ōji) (1977)
"The Wild Swans" (Danish: De vilde svaner), from Fairy Tales Told for Children. New Collection. First Booklet (Danish: Eventyr, fortalte for Børn. Ny Samling. Første Hefte) (1838), Hans Christian Andersen	Wild Swans (Estonian: Metsluiged) (1987)
"The Wild Swans" (Danish: De vilde svaner), from Fairy Tales Told for Children. New Collection. First Booklet (Danish: Eventyr, fortalte for Børn. Ny Samling. Første Hefte) (1838), Hans Christian Andersen	The Wild Swans (2009)
The Willoughbys (2008), Lois Lowry	The Willoughbys (2020)
The Wind in the Willows (1908), Kenneth Grahame	The Adventures of Ichabod and Mr. Toad (1949)
The Wind in the Willows (1908), Kenneth Grahame	The Wind in the Willows (1983)
The Wind in the Willows (1908), Kenneth Grahame	The Wind in the Willows (1987)
The Wind in the Willows (1908), Kenneth Grahame	Wind in the Willows (1988)
The Wind in the Willows (1908), Kenneth Grahame	A Tale of Two Toads (1989)
The Wind in the Willows (1908), Kenneth Grahame	The Adventures of Mole (1995)
The Wind in the Willows (1908), Kenneth Grahame	The Wind in the Willows (1995)
The Wind in the Willows (1908), Kenneth Grahame	The Adventures of Toad (1996)
The Wind in the Willows (1908), Kenneth Grahame	The Willows in Winter (1996)
The Wind in the Willows (1908), Kenneth Grahame	The Wind in the Willows (1996)
The Wind in the Willows (1908), Kenneth Grahame	The Wind in the Willows (2006)
Winnie-the-Pooh (1926–1928) (series) (Note: Plots and elements adapted from two related works: Winnie-the-Pooh (1926) and The House at Pooh Corner (1928).), A.A. Milne	The Many Adventures of Winnie the Pooh (1977)
Winnie-the-Pooh (1926–1928) (series), A.A. Milne	Pooh's Grand Adventure: The Search for Christopher Robin (1997)
Winnie-the-Pooh (1926–1928) (series), A.A. Milne	Winnie the Pooh: Seasons of Giving (1999)
Winnie-the-Pooh (1926–1928) (series), A.A. Milne	The Tigger Movie (2000)
Winnie-the-Pooh (1926–1928) (series), A.A. Milne	The Book of Pooh: Stories from the Heart (2001)
Winnie-the-Pooh (1926–1928) (series), A.A. Milne	Winnie the Pooh: A Very Merry Pooh Year (2002)
Winnie-the-Pooh (1926–1928) (series), A.A. Milne	Piglet's Big Movie (2003)
Winnie-the-Pooh (1926–1928) (series), A.A. Milne	Winnie the Pooh: Springtime with Roo (2004)
Winnie-the-Pooh (1926–1928) (series), A.A. Milne	Pooh's Heffalump Movie (2005)
Winnie-the-Pooh (1926–1928) (series), A.A. Milne	Pooh's Heffalump Halloween Movie (2005)
Winnie-the-Pooh (1926–1928) (series), A.A. Milne	My Friends Tigger and Pooh: Super Sleuth Christmas Movie (2007)
Winnie-the-Pooh (1926–1928) (series), A.A. Milne	Tigger and Pooh and a Musical Too (2009)
Winnie-the-Pooh (1926–1928) (series), A.A. Milne	Super Duper Super Sleuths (2010)
Winnie-the-Pooh (1926–1928) (series), A.A. Milne	Winnie the Pooh (2011)
Winnie-the-Pooh (1926–1928) (series), A.A. Milne	Christopher Robin (2018)
Winnie-the-Pooh (1926–1928) (series), A.A. Milne	Winnie-the-Pooh: Blood and Honey (2023)
Winnie-the-Pooh (1926–1928) (series), A.A. Milne	Winnie-the-Pooh: Blood and Honey 2 (2024)
The Witches (1983), Roald Dahl	The Witches (1990)
The Witches (1983), Roald Dahl	The Witches (2020)
The Wonderful Adventures of Nils (Swedish: Nils Holgerssons underbara resa genom Sverige) (1906), Selma Lagerlöf	The Enchanted Boy (Russian: Заколдованный мальчик, Zakoldovanyy malchik) (1955)
The Wonderful Adventures of Nils (Swedish: Nils Holgerssons underbara resa genom Sverige) (1906), Selma Lagerlöf	Adventures of Nils Holgersson (Swedish: Nils Holgerssons underbara resa) (1962)
The Wonderful Wizard of Oz (1900), L. Frank Baum	The Fairylogue and Radio-Plays (1908)
The Wonderful Wizard of Oz (1900), L. Frank Baum	The Patchwork Girl of Oz (1914)
The Wonderful Wizard of Oz (1900), L. Frank Baum	The Magic Cloak of Oz (1914)
The Wonderful Wizard of Oz (1900), L. Frank Baum	His Majesty, the Scarecrow of Oz (1914)
The Wonderful Wizard of Oz (1900), L. Frank Baum	The Wizard of Oz (1925)
The Wonderful Wizard of Oz (1900), L. Frank Baum	The Wizard of Oz (1939)
The Wonderful Wizard of Oz (1900), L. Frank Baum	Return to Oz (1964)
The Wonderful Wizard of Oz (1900), L. Frank Baum	Fantasía... 3 (1966)
The Wonderful Wizard of Oz (1900), L. Frank Baum	Little Ayşe and the Magic Dwarfs in the Land of Dreams (Turkish: Ayşecik ve Sihirli Cüceler Rüyalar Ülkesinde) (1971)
The Wonderful Wizard of Oz (1900), L. Frank Baum	The Wonderful Wizard of Oz (1975)
The Wonderful Wizard of Oz (1900), L. Frank Baum	Oz (1976)
The Wonderful Wizard of Oz (1900), L. Frank Baum	The Wiz (1978)
The Wonderful Wizard of Oz (1900), L. Frank Baum	The Wizard of Oz (1982)
The Wonderful Wizard of Oz (1900), L. Frank Baum	Lion of Oz (2000)
The Wonderful Wizard of Oz (1900), L. Frank Baum	The Muppets' Wizard of Oz (2005)
The Wonderful Wizard of Oz (1900), L. Frank Baum	After the Wizard (2011)
The Wonderful Wizard of Oz (1900), L. Frank Baum	Tom and Jerry and the Wizard of Oz (2011)
The Wonderful Wizard of Oz (1900), L. Frank Baum	Dorothy and the Witches of Oz (2012)
The Wonderful Wizard of Oz (1900), L. Frank Baum	Oz the Great and Powerful (2013)
The Wonderful Wizard of Oz (1900), L. Frank Baum	Legends of Oz: Dorothy's Return (2013)
The Wonderful Wizard of Oz (1900), L. Frank Baum	Guardians of Oz (2015)
The Wonderful Wizard of Oz (1900), L. Frank Baum	Tom and Jerry: Back to Oz (2016)
The Wonderful Wizard of Oz (1900), L. Frank Baum	The Steam Engines of Oz (2018)
A Wrinkle in Time (1962), Madeleine L'Engle	A Wrinkle in Time (2003)
A Wrinkle in Time (1962), Madeleine L'Engle	A Wrinkle in Time (2018)

== Y ==
Children's book(s)	Film adaptation(s)
The Year of the Horse (1965), Eric S. Hatch	The Horse in the Gray Flannel Suit (1968)
The Yearling (1938), Marjorie Kinnan Rawlings	The Yearling (1946)
The Yearling (1938), Marjorie Kinnan Rawlings	The Yearling (1994)
You Are Umasou (おまえうまそうだな, Omae Umasō da na) (2003), Tatsuya Miyanishi	You Are Umasou (2010)

== Z ==
Children's book(s)	Film adaptation(s)
Z for Zachariah (1974), Robert C. O'Brien	Z for Zachariah (2015)
Zathura (2002), Chris Van Allsburg	Zathura (2005)
Zenon: Girl of the 21st Century (1997), Marilyn Sadler	Zenon: Girl of the 21st Century (1999)
Zenon: Girl of the 21st Century (1997), Marilyn Sadler	Zenon: The Zequel (2001)
Zenon: Girl of the 21st Century (1997), Marilyn Sadler	Zenon: Z3 (2003)

== See also ==
- Lists of children's literature categories
  - List of children's book series
  - List of children's books featuring deaf characters
  - List of children's books featuring characters with limb differences
  - List of children's classic books
  - List of children's literature writers
- Lists of literature made into feature films
  - Lists of works of fiction made into feature films
  - List of short fiction made into feature films
  - List of non-fiction works made into feature films
  - List of comics and comic strips made into feature films
  - List of plays adapted into feature films (disambiguation)
