= The Borrowers =

The Borrowers may refer to:

- The Borrowers (novel), a 1952 juvenile fantasy novel by Mary Norton
- The Borrowers (book series), the book series comprising the novel and its sequels
- Several of the adaptations of the novel and the book series, including:
  - The Borrowers (1973 film), a 1973 television adaptation
  - The Borrowers (1992 TV series), a 1992 television series
  - The Borrowers (1997 film), a 1997 film
  - The Borrowers (2011 film), a 2011 television film
  - The Borrowers (2025 TV series), a 2025 animated television series

== See also ==
- The Borrower, a 1991 science-fiction horror film
- Borrower, a recipient of a loan
