= The Borrowers Aloft =

1961 children's novel by Mary Norton

- First edition (UK)
- Author: Mary Norton
- Illustrator: Diana L. Stanley (UK); Beth and Joe Krush (US)
- Language: English
- Series: The Borrowers
- Genre: Fantasy children's novel
- Published: 1961 (J. M. Dent, UK; Harcourt, Brace & World, US)
- Publication place: United Kingdom and United States
- Pages: 154 pp (UK); 193 pp (US)
- LC Class: PZ7.N8248 Blb 1961
- Preceded by: The Borrowers Afloat
- Followed by: The Borrowers Avenged

The Borrowers Aloft is a children's fantasy novel by Mary Norton, published in 1961 by J. M. Dent in the United Kingdom and by Harcourt, Brace & World in the United States. It is the fourth of five books in The Borrowers series, which began with The Borrowers in 1952.

== Plot ==
With the help of their friend Spiller, the Clock family relocate to the miniature village of Little Fordham, where everything is perfectly scaled to Borrower size. However, they are soon discovered by Miss Menzies, a kind but eccentric human, who reveals their existence to the village's creator, Mr Pott. Miss Menzies and Mr Pott agree to keep the Borrowers a secret, and prepare a functioning miniature cottage for them.

Meanwhile, the Platters, who own a rival model village, learn of the Borrowers' existence. Fearing their own attraction will suffer, they kidnap the Clock family and confine them in an attic, intending to display them in a specially constructed, escape-proof miniature house.

Imprisoned through the winter, Arrietty reads old newspapers and discovers articles about hot-air balloons. She and her father build a Borrower-sized balloon and escape. Unable to return to Little Fordham, the family set out once more in search of a new home.

== Characters ==
Borrowers

- Arrietty Clock
- Pod Clock
- Homily Clock

Humans (called "human beans" by the Borrowers)

- Mr Pott
- Miss Menzies
- Mr Platter
- Mrs Platter

== Adaptations ==
- The Return of the Borrowers (1993), a BBC television sequel to The Borrowers, starred Ian Holm, Penelope Wilton and Rebecca Callard. It adapts elements from The Borrowers Aloft and The Borrowers Afloat.
