= The Borrowers Afloat =

1959 children's novel by Mary Norton

- First edition (UK)
- Author: Mary Norton
- Illustrator: Diana L. Stanley (UK); Beth and Joe Krush (US)
- Language: English
- Series: The Borrowers
- Genre: Fantasy children's novel
- Published: 1959; J. M. Dent (UK); Harcourt, Brace (US)
- Publication place: United Kingdom and US
- Pages: 176pp (UK); 191pp (US)
- LC Class: PZ7.N8248 Bl 1959
- Preceded by: The Borrowers Afield
- Followed by: The Borrowers Aloft

The Borrowers Afloat is a children's fantasy novel by Mary Norton, published in 1959 by Dent in the UK and Harcourt in the US. It was the third of five books in a series that is usually called The Borrowers, inaugurated by The Borrowers in 1952.

== Plot ==
Arrietty Clock and her parents Pod and Homily have arrived safely at their relatives' home in the walls of a gamekeeper's cottage. Although their relatives welcome them, the two families soon find themselves competing for resources. When Arrietty learns that the human family is leaving, the Borrowers worry that they will starve.

Spiller, the outdoors Borrower who helped the family before, tells them about Little Fordham, a model train village. The place has become legendary for Borrowers: a whole village made for Borrower-size residents, with plenty of food dropped by visiting big people.

The Clocks part ways with their relatives. Spiller guides them through the drains beneath the house and lets them stay in one of his hideouts, a tea kettle, while he investigates Little Fordham. During the wait, rainwater sets the kettle adrift downstream. The Clocks decide that their best chance is to hope that Spiller will realize what has happened and find them. Additional adventures occur as they travel by water in the tea kettle.

The tea kettle eventually becomes trapped in some floating debris. Mild Eye, the gypsy who caught the Borrowers before, discovers them while fishing and nearly catches them. The Clock family is trapped, as none of them can swim. However, Spiller arrives just in time to help, and Mild Eye falls into the water and is then arrested for poaching by a passing policeman. The Clocks join Spiller on his barge, heading for Little Fordham.

== Adaptations ==
- The Return of the Borrowers: The 1993 sequel to The Borrowers, this BBC TV series starred Ian Holm, Penelope Wilton and Rebecca Callard. The series was adapted from the third and fourth Borrowers novels, The Borrowers Afield and its sequel The Borrowers Aloft.
