= The Borrowers (book series) =

Children's book series by Mary Norton

- Covers of the original editions
- 1. The Borrowers; 2. The Borrowers Afield; 3. The Borrowers Afloat; 4. The Borrowers Aloft; 5. The Borrowers Avenged
- Author: Mary Norton
- Illustrator: Diana L. Stanley; Pauline Baynes
- Country: United Kingdom
- Language: English
- Genre: Children’s fantasy novels
- Publisher: J. M. Dent; Viking Kestrel
- Published: 1952–1982
- No. of books: 5

The Borrowers is a children’s fantasy book series by English author Mary Norton, published between 1952 and 1982.

It features a family of tiny people who live secretly in the walls and floors of an English house and "borrow" from the big people in order to survive.

There have been several adaptations of The Borrowers in television, on film and on stage.

== Presentation ==
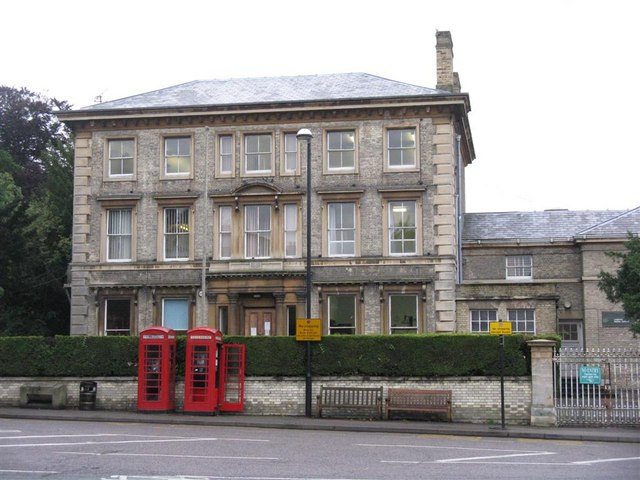
'The Cedars', Norton's home until 1921 and reportedly the setting of The Borrowers

All five Borrowers novels feature the Clock family; Pod, Homily and Arrietty. In the first book they live in a house reportedly based on The Cedars where Norton was raised.

The primary cause of trouble and source of plot is the interaction between the minuscule Borrowers and the "human beans", whether the human motives are kind or selfish. The main character is teenage Arrietty, who often begins relationships with Big People that have chaotic effects on the lives of herself and her family, causing her parents to react with fear and worry.

As a result of Arrietty's curiosity and friendships with Big People, her family are forced to move their home several times from one place to another, making their lives more adventurous than the average Borrower would prefer. After escaping from their home under the kitchen floorboards of an old English manor they finally settle down in the home of a caretaker on the grounds of an old church.

Along the way, they meet more characters: other Borrowers, including a young man around Arrietty's age who lives outdoors and whose only memory of his family is the descriptive phrase, "Dreadful Spiller", which he uses as a name (introduced in The Borrowers Afield); the Harpsichord family who are relatives of the Clock family; Peregrine ("Peagreen") Overmantel; and Big People such as Mild Eye the gypsy; Tom Goodenough, the gardener's son; and Miss Menzies, a sweet but overly helpful woman. Most Borrower names are "borrowed" from human objects. Stainless is named after items in the kitchen cutlery drawer.

== Books ==
1. The Borrowers (1952)
2. The Borrowers Afield (1955)
3. The Borrowers Afloat (1959)
4. The Borrowers Aloft (1961)
5. The Borrowers Avenged (1982)

Short story: "Poor Stainless" (1966)

The Borrowers is a series of five novels including The Borrowers and four sequels that feature the same family after they leave "their" house. The sequels are titled alliteratively and alphabetically: The Borrowers Afield (1955), The Borrowers Afloat (1959), The Borrowers Aloft (1961), and The Borrowers Avenged (1982). The first four were originally published by J. M. Dent in hardcover editions. Puffin Books published a 700-page trade paperback omnibus edition in 1983, The Complete Borrowers Stories with a short introduction by Norton.

The short, unrevised, separate book Poor Stainless and only appearing in The Eleanor Farjeon Book (1966) was later revised as a novelette and re-published as a stand-alone book, first edition, in 1971 by J.M. Dent and Company and then again 24 years later posthumously with a short author's note in 1994, by Viking. The narrative, told by Homily to Arrietty, occurs before the first of the full-length Borrower novels, and concerns a small adventure Stainless has when he gets lost.

== Adaptations ==
There have been several screen adaptations of The Borrowers:

- The Borrowers: a 1973 American made-for-TV movie in the Hallmark Hall of Fame.
- The Borrowers and The Return of the Borrowers: a 1992 BBC TV series and its 1993 sequel, both starring Ian Holm, Penelope Wilton and Rebecca Callard.
- The Borrowers: a 1997 film with a cast including Tom Felton, John Goodman, Jim Broadbent, Hugh Laurie, Bradley Pierce and Mark Williams.
- Arrietty: a 2010 Japanese animated film from Studio Ghibli, known as The Secret World of Arrietty in North America.
- The Borrowers: a 2011 BBC production starring Stephen Fry, Victoria Wood, and Christopher Eccleston.
- The Borrowers: a 2025 French animated TV series of 47 episodes

An animated film by Aardman Animations directed by Peter Lord was in project in 1989 but cancelled. A new feature film tentatively written by Patrick Burleigh and directed by Conrad Vernon is in the works. There have also been numerous theatrical adaptations of The Borrowers.

== See also ==
- Eduard Uspensky's Little Warranty People (1975) features tiny people that live in electrical utility devices and provide warranty services for them
- The Littles, a later series by John Peterson, also featuring a family of tiny people
- Mistress Masham's Repose by T. H. White features a surviving remnant of the race of Lilliputians which a young girl discovers living on an island on her country estate
- The Nome Trilogy (also called The Bromeliad Trilogy) by Terry Pratchett
