= The Borrowers Avenged =

1982 children's novel by Mary Norton

- First UK edition
- Author: Mary Norton
- Illustrator: Pauline Baynes (UK); Beth and Joe Krush (US)
- Language: English
- Series: The Borrowers
- Genre: Fantasy children's novel
- Publisher: Viking Kestrel (UK); Harcourt Brace Jovanovich
- Publication date: November 1982
- Publication place: United Kingdom and US
- Pages: 284pp (UK); 298pp (US)
- ISBN: 0722658044; ISBN 0152105301
- LC Class: PZ7.N8248 Bm 1983; PZ7.N8248 Bm 1982
- Preceded by: The Borrowers Aloft

The Borrowers Avenged is a children's fantasy novel by Mary Norton, published in 1982 by Viking Kestrel in the UK and Harcourt in the US. It was the last of five books in a series that is usually called The Borrowers, inaugurated by The Borrowers in 1952.

The Borrowers Avenged was written more than 20 years after its predecessor The Borrowers Aloft (1961). It is about twice as long as the others at nearly 300 pages; the 1966 British omnibus edition of four novels was only 699 pages. Pauline Baynes succeeded Diana L. Stanley as illustrator in the UK while Beth and Joe Krush continued as US illustrators.

The book received a positive reception by critics. New York magazine called it a "well-drawn portrait ...wittily told" while Country Life called it "a modern classic in the making".

== Plot ==
The Clock family are Borrowers, tiny beings. Having escaped from the attic of the scheming humans Mr and Mrs Platter, the Clock family return to the Little Fordham model village and travel in their Borrower friend Spiller's boat for their new home, the rectory of the local church. They make a night journey down the river, barely missing the Platters who are looking for them. When the Borrowers arrive at the rectory, they discover that their relatives Lupy, Hendreary and Timmus are living in the church next door. Arrietty also meets another Borrower, Peagreen Overmantel, who shows them a place to live under a window seat.

The Clocks settle in comfortably to their new home. Arrietty is allowed to go outside and do all of the borrowing for the two Borrower families. She discovers that her human friend Miss Menzies goes to the church to arrange flowers, but she is forbidden to speak to her. The Platters, having severely damaged the model village in their hunt for the Borrowers, decide to use one of Homily's old aprons to help the local "finder" Lady Mullings locate the Borrowers. Miss Menzies recognises the apron and becomes suspicious.

Meanwhile, the Platters spot Timmus in the church and break in after hours to catch him, but they accidentally ring the church bells and are caught by the humans in suspicious circumstances.

== Characters ==
Borrowers ("little people")

- Arrietty Clock – An independent and spirited fourteen-year-old girl who loves the outdoors and has a penchant for talking to humans.
- Pod Clock – Her father, a shoemaker and a highly skilled borrower.
- Homily Clock – His wife, less adventuresome than her husband and daughter.
- Hendreary – Homily's older brother and Arrietty's maternal uncle, who suffers from gout.
- Lupy – Hendreary's wife, who has become religious from living in the church.
- Timmus – An adventuresome little boy who likes to climb around in the church.
- Peagreen Overmantel – A poetic, artistic borrower who is lame since he fell off the fireplace mantel. Peagreen has lived in the rectory all of his life.
- Spiller – An outdoors borrower, taciturn and a loner. He is exceptionally skilled with a short-bow and arrow from a short distance.

Big People, or human beans

- Mr Platter – A greedy builder and undertaker who is determined to make a fortune exhibiting the Clocks.
- Mrs Platter – His wife, who worries about being caught by the police.
- Miss Menzies – Arrietty's kind and caring human friend and acquaintance.
- Lady Mullings – The village "finder", who claims that she can find lost people and objects using an unusual psionic ability known as sixth sense.
