= The Borrowers Afield =

1955 children's novel by Mary Norton

- First edition (UK)
- Author: Mary Norton
- Illustrator: Diana L. Stanley (UK); Beth and Joe Krush (US)
- Language: English
- Series: The Borrowers
- Genre: Fantasy children's novel
- Published: 1955 (J. M. Dent, UK; Harcourt, Brace, US)
- Publication place: United Kingdom
- Pages: 193pp (UK); 215pp (US)
- LC Class: PZ7.N8248 Bi 1955
- Preceded by: The Borrowers
- Followed by: The Borrowers Afloat

The Borrowers Afield is a children's fantasy novel by Mary Norton, published in 1955 by Dent in the UK and Harcourt in the US. It was the second of five books in a series that is usually called The Borrowers, inaugurated by The Borrowers in 1952.

== Plot ==
Kate is looking at a cottage with her aunt Mrs May. Kate learns that the present tenant Tom Goodenough knows Arrietty harpschicord, a tiny "Borrower" also known to Mrs May's brother. Tom relates the troubles of Arrietty and her parents. Driven from their home in an old English house, unable to track down their relatives, they live in an old sock.

Spiller, a mysterious wild Borrower, brings meat and saves Arrietty from a dog attack. Although everything outdoors — cows, moths, field mice, cold weather, rain and general British weather— endangers the Borrowers' lives, they learn to survive in the wild. One night, a Romani Mild Eye finds his lost boot and brings the Clocks back to his vardo. Tom and Spiller rescue the Clocks. In their new home with Tom, they find their long-lost relatives. In Tom, Arrietty finds a good friend and ally.

== Characters ==
Borrowers

- Arrietty Clock, fourteen-year-old spirited daughter
- Pod Clock, father
- Homily Clock, mother
- Spiller, a wild Borrower

Human beans or "Big people"

- May
- Kate
- Tom Goodenough, tenant
- Mild Eye
- Gypsy

== Adaptations ==
- The Borrowers (1992 TV series)
