= Parsimony =

Parsimony may refer to:

- The law of parsimony, or Occam's razor, a problem-solving principle
  - Maximum parsimony (phylogenetics), an optimality criterion in phylogenetics
- Parsimony Press, a fine press brand ran by typographer Robert Norton
- Parsimonious reduction, a type of reduction in complexity theory

== See also ==
- Frugality
- Philosophical razor
- Simplicity
