= Mary Norton (writer) =

English children's writer (1903–1992)

- Mary Norton
- Born: Kathleen Mary Pearson; 10 December 1903; London, England
- Died: 29 August 1992 (aged 88); Bideford, Devon, England
- Occupation: Writer
- Spouses: Robert Norton (m. 1926, divorced); Lionel Bonsey (m. 1970)
- Children: 4, including Robert
- Writing career
- Genre: Children's fantasy novels
- Notable works: The Borrowers series; The Magic Bed Knob; Bonfires and Broomsticks; Are All the Giants Dead?
- Notable awards: Carnegie Medal; 1952

Kathleen Mary Norton (née Pearson; 10 December 1903 – 29 August 1992) was an English writer of children's books. She is best known for The Borrowers series of low fantasy novels (1952 to 1982), which is named after its first book and, in turn, the tiny people who live secretly in the midst of contemporary human civilisation.

Norton won the 1952 Carnegie Medal from the Library Association, recognising The Borrowers as the year's outstanding children's book by a British author. For the 70th anniversary of the Medal in 2007 it was named one of the top 10 winning works, selected by a panel to compose the ballot for a public election of the all-time favourite. (Note: Today there are usually eight books on the Carnegie shortlist. The Borrowers Afloat, third in the series, was one of five "Commended" runners-up for the 1959 Medal. The distinction was used about 160 times from 1954 to 2002, counting both commendation and high commendation in later years.) Norton's novels The Magic Bed Knob; or, How to Become a Witch in Ten Easy Lessons and Bonfires and Broomsticks were adapted into the 1971 Disney film Bedknobs and Broomsticks.

== Life ==
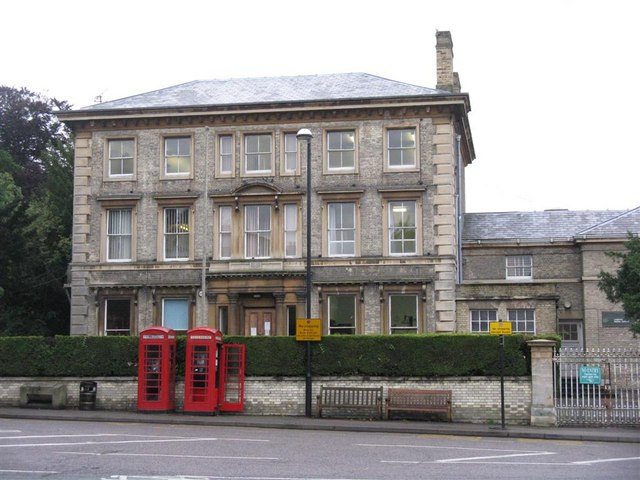
'The Cedars', Norton's home until 1921 and reputedly the setting of The Borrowers

Kathleen Mary Pearson was the daughter of a physician and grew up in a Georgian house at the end of the High Street in Leighton Buzzard. The house now forms part of Leighton Middle School, known within the school as The Old House, and was reputedly the setting of her novel The Borrowers.

She married Robert Charles Norton on 4 September 1926 and had four children, two boys and two girls; her son, also named Robert Norton, became a printer and Microsoft executive. Her second husband was Lionel Bonsey, whom she married in 1970.

Norton began working for the British War Office in 1940 before the family moved temporarily to the United States. She began writing while working for the British Purchasing Commission in New York City during the Second World War. Her first book was The Magic Bed Knob; or, How to Become a Witch in Ten Easy Lessons, published by J. M. Dent in 1944. Its sequel Bonfires and Broomsticks followed two years later and they were re-issued jointly as Bed-Knob and Broomstick in 1957. The stories became the basis for the 1971 Disney film Bedknobs and Broomsticks.

During her latter years Norton lived with her second husband in the village of Hartland in Devon. She died of a stroke in Bideford, Devon, England, on 29 August 1992.

== Works ==
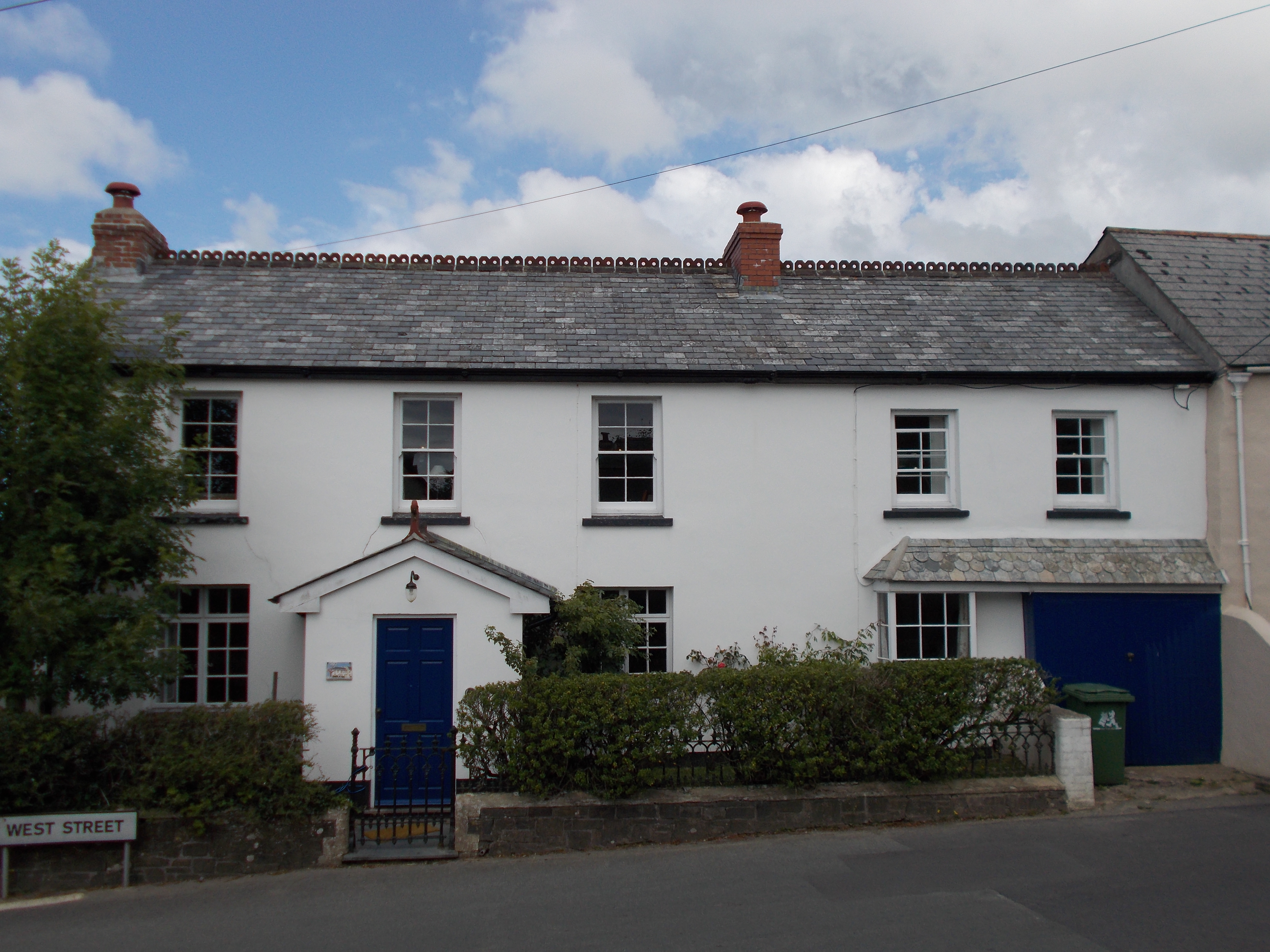
"Borrowers' Cottage" in Hartland, North Devon, where Norton spent her final years living with her second husband, Lionel Bonsey

The first edition hardcover books were published in Britain by J. M. Dent. A picture book version of her first story appeared in the US as The Magic Bed-Knob (1943), with color illustrations by Waldo Peirce.

- The Magic Bedknob (1944)
- Bonfires and Broomsticks (1947)
  The omnibus edition Bedknob and Broomstick (Dent, 1957) included new illustrations by Erik Blegvad; following the 1971 Disney film adaptation, the plural Bedknobs and Broomsticks was also used in print.
- The Borrowers series:
  1. The Borrowers (1952) — winner of the Carnegie Medal
  2. The Borrowers Afield (1955)
  3. The Borrowers Afloat (1959) — a Carnegie runner-up
  4. The Borrowers Aloft (1961)
  5. The Borrowers Avenged (Viking Kestrel, 1982)
  - Poor Stainless: A New Story About the Borrowers (1966)
  - The Complete Borrowers Stories (1983) — omnibus, excluding Poor Stainless, issued with an introduction by the author
  - Poor Stainless (Viking UK, 1994) — revised as a novelette with a short author's note
- Are All the Giants Dead? (1975) — no relation to the Borrowers series
- The Bread and Butter Stories (1998) - collection of short stories for adults, written for magazines

== Film, TV and theatrical adaptations ==
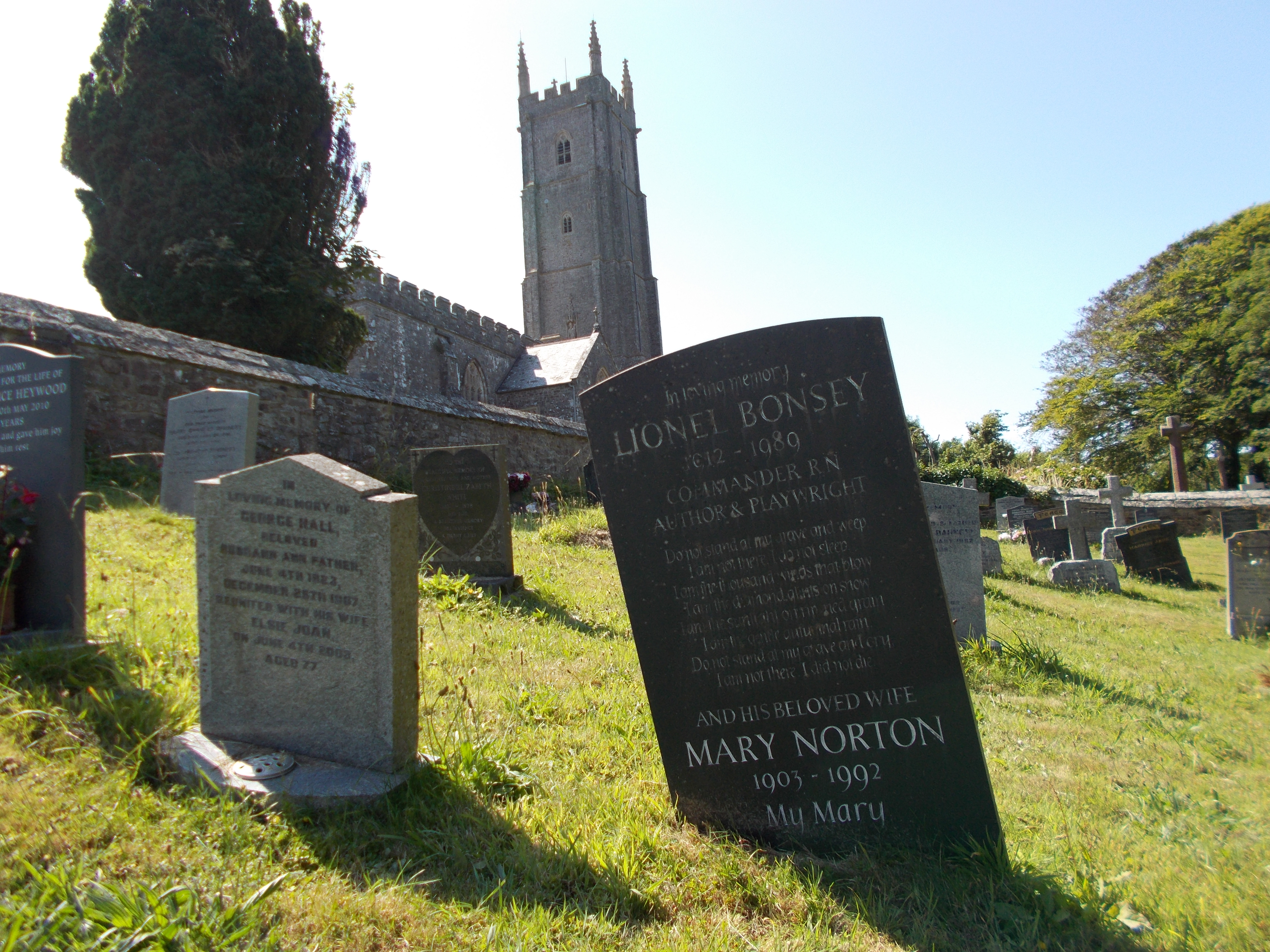
Mary Norton's final resting place in the graveyard of St. Nectan's Church, the parish church of Hartland, Devon. The inscription on the headstone reads: "Do not stand at my grave and weep, I am not there. I do not sleep. I am a thousand winds that blow. I am the diamond glints on snow. I am the sunlight on ripened grain. I am the gentle autumnal rain. Do not stand at my grave and cry; I am not there. I did not die". (Extract from a poem by Claire Harner.)

=== The Borrowers ===
There have been several screen adaptations of The Borrowers:

- The Borrowers: a 1973 American made-for-TV movie.
- The Borrowers: a 1992 BBC TV series and its 1993 sequel The Return of the Borrowers, both starring Ian Holm and Penelope Wilton.
- The Borrowers: a 1997 film with a British/American cast including Tom Felton, John Goodman, Jim Broadbent, Celia Imrie and Mark Williams.
- The Secret World of Arrietty: a 2010 Japanese animated film from Studio Ghibli.
- The Borrowers: a 2011 British film starring Stephen Fry, Victoria Wood and Christopher Eccleston.
- The Borrowers: a 2025 French animated TV series

There have also been numerous theatrical adaptations of The Borrowers.

=== Other works ===
Norton's novels The Magic Bedknob; or, How to Become a Witch in Ten Easy Lessons and Bonfires and Broomsticks were adapted into the 1971 Disney film Bedknobs and Broomsticks, starring Angela Lansbury and David Tomlinson.
