= The Return of the Borrowers =

1993 British TV children's series

- Based on: The Borrowers Afloat; The Borrowers Aloft by Mary Norton
- Written by: Richard Carpenter
- Directed by: John Henderson
- Starring: Ian Holm; Penelope Wilton; Rebecca Callard
- Music by: Howard Goodall
- Country of origin: United Kingdom
- Original language: English

Production
- Producer: Grainne Marmion
- Cinematography: Clive Tickner
- Editor: David Yardley
- Running time: 172 mins approx
- Production companies: Working Title Films; DeFaria Company

Original release
- Network: BBC2
- Release: 14 November 1993

Related
- The Borrowers

The Return of the Borrowers is a BBC TV children's programme first broadcast in 1993 on BBC2. The series is adapted from the third and fourth novels of author Mary Norton's The Borrowers series: The Borrowers Afloat (1959) and The Borrowers Aloft (1961), respectively.

The series is the sequel to The Borrowers, another TV series that first aired in 1992 also on BBC2. Like the first series, every episode (except the last one) ended on a cliffhanger.

Both series follow the Clocks, a family of tiny people who have fled from their home under the floorboards in an old manor into the English countryside.

== Plot ==
Once again the Clock Family (a teenage girl named Arrietty and her parents, Pod and Homily), tiny "borrowers" who live in a cottage of regular sized human beings, are forced to find a new place to live when they learn of the upcoming departure of the humans in whose house they reside. Hendreary, Lupy, and Eggletina remain behind at the cottage. With the help of their friend Spiller, Arrietty, Pod, and Homily escape through the house drain system and temporarily move to a kettle Spiller has looked after. Spiller tells the Clock family about a model village called Little Fordham which is down the stream. Spiller and Arrietty go back to the Manor where George provides them with a "boat" (which is actually a large cutlery holder with a pin for an anchor and a knife for steering).

Meanwhile, Pod's nephews Ditchley and Ilrick trap Pod and Homily in the kettle as a joke by jamming the lid on with a stick, then leave. A storm comes and the kettle is swept down the stream. A rock knocks the stick off the lid and Pod and Homily manage to get out of the kettle before it hits a large stick suspended across two rocks. The next morning, Spiller and Arrietty find the kettle sunk near the bank just as Ditchley and Ilrick arrive, realizing their joke went too far. Pod and Homily arrive and Pod interrogates Ditchley and Ilrick for their actions and scares them off. The Clock family sail down the stream overnight and are nearly caught by Mild Eye, who is stopped by a Police Officer who presumably arrests him. The Borrowers arrive in Little Fordham where they try to live in secret.

A relative of George's called Ms. Menzies arrives at the manor and explains to Mrs. Driver that George sent a letter to his parents saying that he wasn't happy at the manor. Ms. Menzies then explains it would be better if George were to spend his Summer Holidays with her instead. Mrs. Driver is more than happy to accept it and George leaves with Ms. Menzies to stay in a place called Fordham, which is the town Little Fordham was modeled after. Arrietty befriends Miss Menzies and also meets George, but unknown to the Clocks, the owner of Little Fordham, Mr. Pott, sees two of them while attending to the model buildings.

The Borrowers are eventually discovered by a couple who own a rival model village and are kidnapped with the intention of being put on attraction when that model village opens for tourist season. Imprisoned in the couple's attic, the Clocks are able to use materials they find to create a hot-air balloon and basket which lifts them out of a window to freedom moments before they are to be put on display.

Knowing they cannot risk moving back into Little Fordham, the family again take to the great outdoors, in search of a new place to call home. Spiller tells the Clocks that there's an old watermill, one human and plenty to eat down the stream. Arrietty writes a letter to George explaining that they are leaving Little Fordham, and thanking him, Ms. Menzies and Mr. Pott for everything. The series ends with the Borrowers sailing down the stream, and Pod says that whatever happens, there's always some way to manage.

== Cast ==
- Ian Holm as Pod Clock
- Penelope Wilton as Homily Clock
- Rebecca Callard as Arrietty Clock
- Daniel Newman as "Dreadful Spiller"
- Paul Cross as George
- Siân Phillips as Mrs. Driver
- Tony Haygarth as Mildeye
- Gemma Jones as Miss Menzies
- Richard Vernon as Mr. Potts
- Robert Lang as Mr. Sidney Platter
- Judy Parfitt as Mrs. Mabel Platter
- Stanley Lebor as Uncle Hendreary Harpsichord
- Pamela Cundell as Aunt Lupy Harpsichord
- Ben Chaplin as Ditchley Harpsichord
- Ross McCall as Ilrick Harpsichord
- Victoria Donovan as Eggletina Harpsichord

== Recycled footage ==
Throughout the series of The Borrowers, various clips were reused (possibly to save money).

- The bushes and brambles that Mildeye walks past after Pod escapes from his bag are seen again after Spiller ties the boat up just before the Borrowers arrive at Little Fordham.
- Two clips of the white fast-moving water in the stream during the storm were used twice — once with just the water in-shot and once with the kettle floating past.
- The wide shot of the stream where Arrietty and Spiller are looking for the kettle was reused in the final episode when the Borrowers leave Little Fordam
- The clip of Little Fordam's entrance appeared again in the final episode after the Borrowers escaped the attic.
- The wide shot of the attic door was filmed once then reused for the scenes when footsteps were heard behind it.
- The clip of the Borrowers approaching Little Fordam in their boat was used again at the end of the final episode. The only difference in the final episode was that the boat was further down the stream.

== Awards ==
BAFTA Awards

- 1994 Best Design (Nominated)
