= Phin Glynn =

British film and television producer

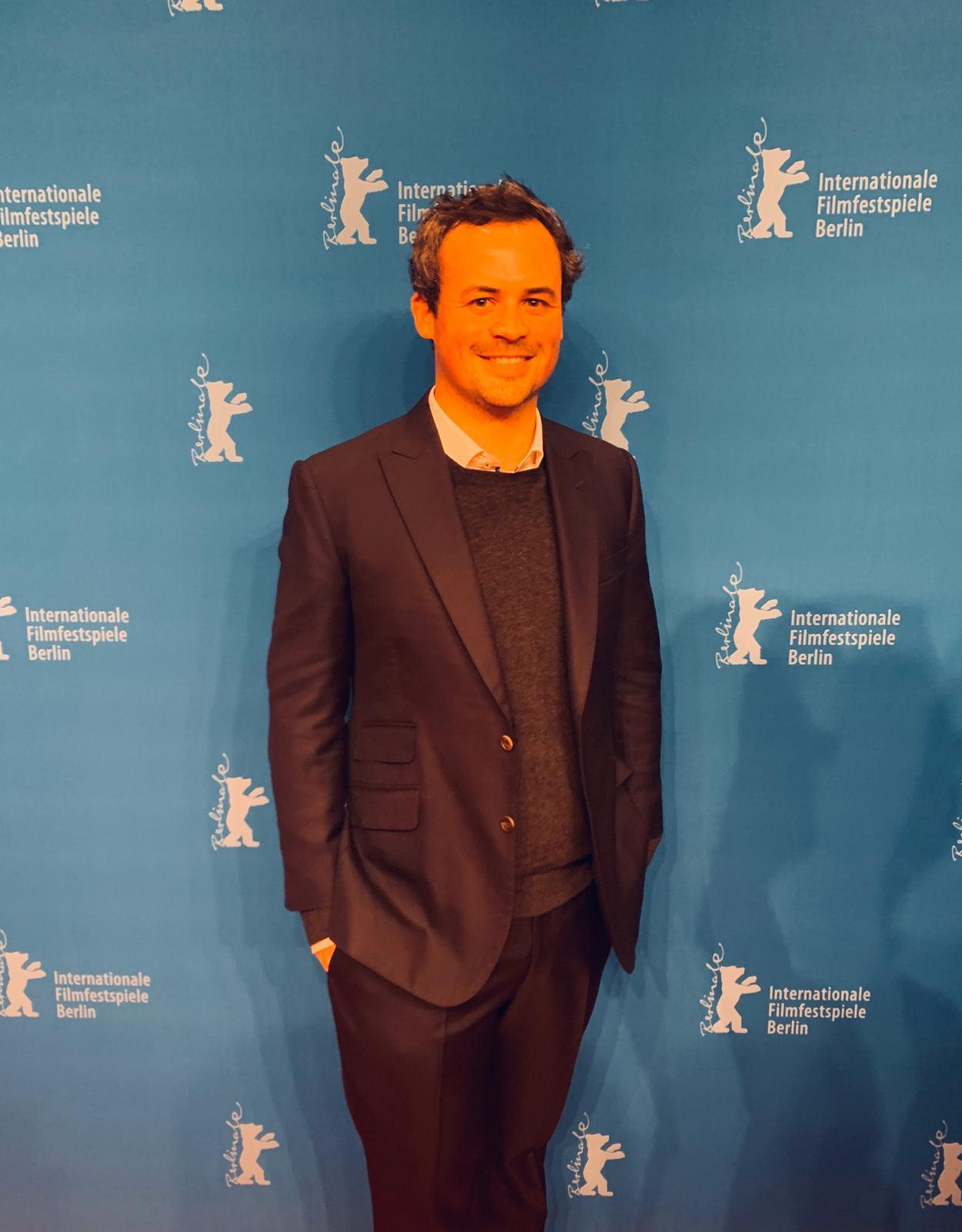
- Born: Oxford, England
- Occupations: Producer, writer
- Years active: 2013–present

Phin Glynn is a British film and television producer and writer.

== Career ==
Glynn is best known as co-creator and producer of Staged, which premiered on BBC One.

In 2018, he formed Infinity Hill alongside Axel Kuschevatzky and Cindy Teperman.

== Filmography ==
| Year | Title | Contribution | Note |
|---|---|---|---|
| 2013 | Underdogs | Associate producer | Animated film |
| 2017 | Mad to Be Normal | Producer | Feature film |
| 2017 | That Good Night | Executive producer | Feature film |
| 2017 | You, Me and Him | Producer | Feature film |
| 2018 | Killer Retreat | Producer | Feature film |
| 2020 | Waiting for Anya | Producer | Feature film |
| 2020 | The Intruder | Associate producer | Feature film |
| 2020 | Nasha Natasha | Associate producer | Documentary |
| 2020 | The Doorman | Producer | Feature film |
| 2020-21 | Staged | Writer and producer | TV series |
| 2022 | Argentina, 1985 | Executive producer | Feature film |
| 2024 | A Bit of Light | Producer | Feature film |
| TBA | Glenrothan | Producer | Feature film |

== Bibliography ==
- 2021 - Completely Staged ISBN 978-1-8001809-2-5

== Awards and nominations ==
| Year | Result | Award | Category | Work | Ref. |
|---|---|---|---|---|---|
| 2020 | Won | Comedy.co.uk Awards | Best New TV Sitcom | Staged | |
| 2021 | Won | Broadcasting Press Guild | Best Comedy | Staged | |
| 2021 | Won | Banff World Media Festival | Short Fiction Program | Staged | |
| 2021 | Nominated | Rose d'Or | Best Comedy Programme | Staged | |
| 2021 | Nominated | Venice TV Awards | Best Comedy | Staged | |
