= Arrietty =

2010 Japanese animated film

- Theatrical poster for Arrietty

Japanese name
- Kanji: 借りぐらしのアリエッティ
Transcriptions
- Revised Hepburn: Karigurashi no Arietti
- Directed by: Hiromasa Yonebayashi
- Screenplay by: Hayao Miyazaki Keiko Niwa
- Based on: The Borrowers by Mary Norton
- Produced by: Toshio Suzuki
- Starring: Mirai Shida Ryunosuke Kamiki Shinobu Otake Keiko Takeshita Tatsuya Fujiwara Tomokazu Miura Kirin Kiki
- Cinematography: Atsushi Okui
- Edited by: Keiko Kadokawa Rie Matsubara Hiromi Sasaki Takeshi Seyama
- Music by: Cécile Corbel
- Production company: Studio Ghibli
- Distributed by: Toho
- Release date: 17 July 2010
- Running time: 95 minutes
- Country: Japan
- Language: Japanese
- Budget: $23 million
- Box office: $149 million

Arrietty, titled Arrietty the Borrower (Note: Japanese: 借りぐらしのアリエッティ, Hepburn: Karigurashi no Arietti) in Japan and The Secret World of Arrietty in North America, is a 2010 Japanese animated fantasy film directed by Hiromasa Yonebayashi as his feature film debut as a director, animated by Studio Ghibli for the Nippon Television Network, Dentsu, Hakuhodo DY Media Partners, Walt Disney Japan, Mitsubishi, Toho and Wild Bunch. The screenplay by Hayao Miyazaki and Keiko Niwa, was based on the 1952 novel The Borrowers by Mary Norton, an English author of children's books, about a family of tiny people who live secretly in the walls and floors of a typical household, borrowing items from humans to survive. The film stars the voices of Mirai Shida, Ryunosuke Kamiki, Shinobu Otake, Keiko Takeshita, Tatsuya Fujiwara, Tomokazu Miura, and Kirin Kiki, and tells the story of a young Borrower (Arrietty) befriending a human boy (Sho), while trying to avoid being detected by the other humans.

Ghibli announced the film in late 2009 with Yonebayashi making his directorial debut. Miyazaki supervised the production as a developing planner. The voice actors were approached in April 2010, and Cécile Corbel wrote the film's score as well as its theme song. This film marks the cinematic debut of Yonebayashi, as well as the British dub marking the cinematic debut of Tom Holland.

The film was released in Japan on July 17, 2010, by Toho, and received positive reviews from critics, who praised its animation and music. It became the highest-grossing Japanese film at the Japanese box office for the year 2010, and grossed $149 million worldwide. The film also won the Animation of the Year award at the 34th Japan Academy Prize award ceremony. Two English-language versions of the film were produced, a British dub released in the United Kingdom on July 29, 2011, by Optimum Releasing and an American dub released in North America on February 17, 2012, by Walt Disney Pictures.

== Plot ==
A boy named Shō tells the story of the week in summer he spent at his mother's home with his maternal great-aunt, Sadako, and the housemaid, Haru. Living within the walls of the house is a family of Borrowers, miniature human beings who come out at night to "borrow" small trinkets for survival; stern patriarch Pod, antsy matriarch Homily and their adventurous daughter Arrietty. When Shō arrives, he gets a glimpse of Arrietty hiding in the plants.

At night, Pod takes Arrietty on her first "borrowing" mission, to get sugar and tissue paper. After obtaining a sugar cube from the kitchen, they travel to a bedroom which they enter through a dollhouse. It is Shō's bedroom; he sees Arrietty when she tries to take a tissue from his table. Startled, she drops the sugar cube. Shō tries to call out to her, but Pod and Arrietty leave.

The next day, Shō places the sugar cube and a little note beside the air vent. Pod warns Arrietty not to take it because their existence must be kept secret from humans. Nevertheless, she sneaks out to visit Shō in his bedroom. Without showing herself, she tells him to leave her family alone, but they soon have a conversation, which is interrupted by a crow. The crow attacks Arrietty, but Shō manages to save her. When Haru comes in to fend off the crow, she grows suspicious of the presence of Borrowers. On her return home, Arrietty is intercepted by her father. Realizing they have been detected, Pod and Homily decide they must move out. Shō learns from Sadako that his mother and grandfather had noticed the presence of Borrowers in the house and had a dollhouse built for them. The Borrowers had not been seen since.

Pod returns injured from a borrowing mission and is helped home by Spiller, a Borrower who lives in the wild. Shō removes the floorboard concealing the Borrower household and replaces their kitchen with the kitchen from the dollhouse to show he hopes for them to stay. However, the Borrowers are frightened by this and speed up their moving process. Pod recovers and Arrietty bids farewell to Shō. Shō apologizes that he has forced them to move out and reveals he has had a heart condition since birth and will undergo an operation in a few days. The operation does not have a good chance of success. He is accepting, saying that every living thing dies.

Haru notices the floorboards have been disturbed. She unearths the Borrowers' house and captures Homily. Alerted by her mother's screams, Arrietty goes to investigate. Saddened by her departure, Shō returns to his room. Haru locks him in and calls a pest control company to capture the other Borrowers alive. Arrietty comes to Shō for help; they rescue Homily and he removes all traces of the Borrowers' presence, including putting the kitchen back in the dollhouse.

On their way out during the night, the Borrowers are spotted by the cat Niya. Thereupon Niya leads Shō to the "river", a small rivulet, where the Borrowers are waiting for Spiller to take them further. Shō gives Arrietty a sugar cube and tells her that she will always be a part of him and that her courage and the Borrowers' fight for survival have made him want to live through the operation. In return, Arrietty gives him her hairclip, a small clothespin, as a token of remembrance. The Borrowers leave in a floating teapot with Spiller in search of a new home.

The Disney international dubbed version contains a final monologue, where Shō states that he never saw Arrietty again. He returned to the house a year later, indicating that the operation had been successful. However, he overhears rumors of objects disappearing in neighboring homes.

== Production ==
=== Development ===
On December 16, 2009, Studio Ghibli announced Karigurashi no Arrietty to be released in 2010. The film is based on the novel The Borrowers by the British writer Mary Norton. The novel won the Carnegie Medal for children's literature in 1953, and the book series had already been adapted into two films and a TV series at the time. Studio Ghibli founders Isao Takahata and Hayao Miyazaki had been contemplating an adaptation of this novel for the past 40 years.

Animator Hiromasa Yonebayashi was announced as the film director on the same day. Hiromasa Yonebayashi was one of the animators for the Studio Ghibli films Howl's Moving Castle, Ponyo and Spirited Away. He was also the reserve director for the film Tales from Earthsea. Miyazaki was announced as the production planner.

=== Casting ===
The Japanese voice cast of the film was announced on April 13, 2010. Actress Mirai Shida was cast as the voice of Arrietty. Arrietty was Shida's first voice acting role. In addition, Ryunosuke Kamiki, who has voiced characters in other Studio Ghibli films, including Spirited Away, and Howl's Moving Castle was cast as Shō.

Besides them, the film's cast includes Tomokazu Miura, Shinobu Otake, Keiko Takeshita, and Kirin Kiki. The four actors had previous voice acting experience, but none of them had been in a Studio Ghibli film before. Miura and Otake were, respectively, cast as Arrietty's parents Pod and Homily. In addition, Takeshita voiced Shō's aunt and Kiki voiced the housemaid Haru.

On January 8, 2011, actress and singer Bridgit Mendler was cast as Arrietty for the film's North American release. Besides Mendler, the cast included Will Arnett, Amy Poehler, Carol Burnett, and David Henrie. The film had a different voice cast for the United Kingdom release. The cast included Saoirse Ronan, Tom Holland, Mark Strong, Olivia Colman, Phyllida Law, and Geraldine McEwan.

The cast is:

Character	Japanese voice actor	English UK dubbing actor (StudioCanal, 2011)	English US dubbing actor (Disney, 2012)
Arrietty (アリエッティ, Arietti)	Mirai Shida	Saoirse Ronan	Bridgit Mendler
Shō (翔)	Ryunosuke Kamiki	Tom Holland	David Henrie as Shawn
Homily (ホミリー, Homirī)	Shinobu Otake	Olivia Colman	Amy Poehler
Pod (ポッド, Poddo)	Tomokazu Miura	Mark Strong	Will Arnett
Haru (ハル)	Kirin Kiki	Geraldine McEwan	Carol Burnett as Hara
Spiller (スピラー, Supirā)	Tatsuya Fujiwara	Luke Allen-Gale	Moisés Arias
Sadako Maki (牧 貞子, Maki Sadako)	Keiko Takeshita	Phyllida Law	Gracie Moore as Jessica

=== Music ===
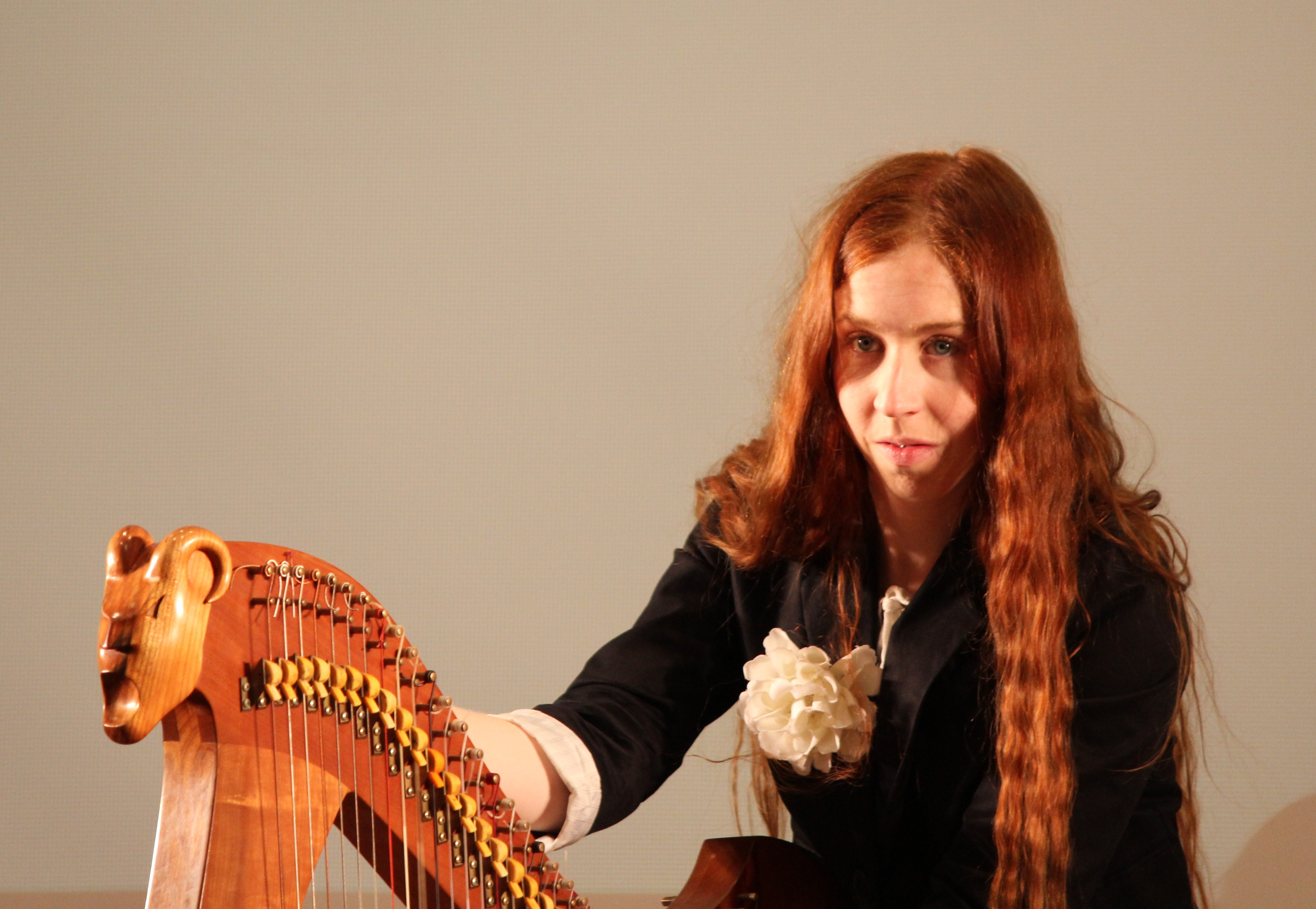
Cécile Corbel in concert in Tokyo for the release of the film's soundtrack

The film score of Arrietty was composed by French recording artist and musician Cécile Corbel, the first time a non-Japanese composer worked with the studio.

After ending promotion for her second album SongBook vol. 2, Corbel, a fan of the studio's output, sent one of her remaining promo albums to Studio Ghibli. At the time, the film was in pre-production and producer Toshio Suzuki wanted a Celtic-inspired score. Less than ten days later, she received an email from Studio Ghibli about her CD. The envelope, because it was handwritten, had caught the eye of Suzuki, and he had listened to the album. He was captivated by Corbel's voice and the sound of the harp, and after playing the album for Yonebayashi and Yamaha Music, Corbel was assigned to write the title song of the film, followed by more songs. By 2009, she was asked to compose the entire score.

The score combined the musical styles of Celtic folk music, medieval Turkish songs, Baroque madrigals, and Irish marches. It was recorded in France with a small orchestra including acoustic guitar, bass, a string quartet, bagpipes, Irish flutes, bodhrán, percussion instruments, and accordion. The soundtrack album won "Best Original Soundtrack Album" at the 2011 Japan Gold Disc Awards. It also became a RIAJ-certified gold record in Japan, where more than 200,000 copies were sold.

==== Arrietty's Song ====
"Arrietty's Song", the film's main theme, was performed by Corbel in Japanese, English, German, Italian, Breton, and French.

The song made its public debut in a presentation of the song by singer Corbel and percussionist Marco in Apple's store in Shibuya, Tokyo, on 8 August 2010. Some of the Japanese theme songs for this film, including "Arrietty's Song" was first released online through the iTunes Store, mora and Musico on 19 December 2009. Subsequently, the official album containing all of the theme songs of this film was released on 14 July 2010. The album's listing on the Oricon charts peaked at the 31st position. Separately, the song "Arrietty's Song" were released as a singles album on 7 April 2010.

===== Track listings =====
- U.S. / Digital Download
1. "Arrietty's Song" (Digital Download) – 3:26

===== Charts =====
Chart (2010)	Peak position
Japan (Japan Hot 100)	98

==== Summertime ====
"Summertime" is a song performed by American pop recording artist Bridgit Mendler for the film's North American release. The song was released by Hollywood Records on February 2, 2012.

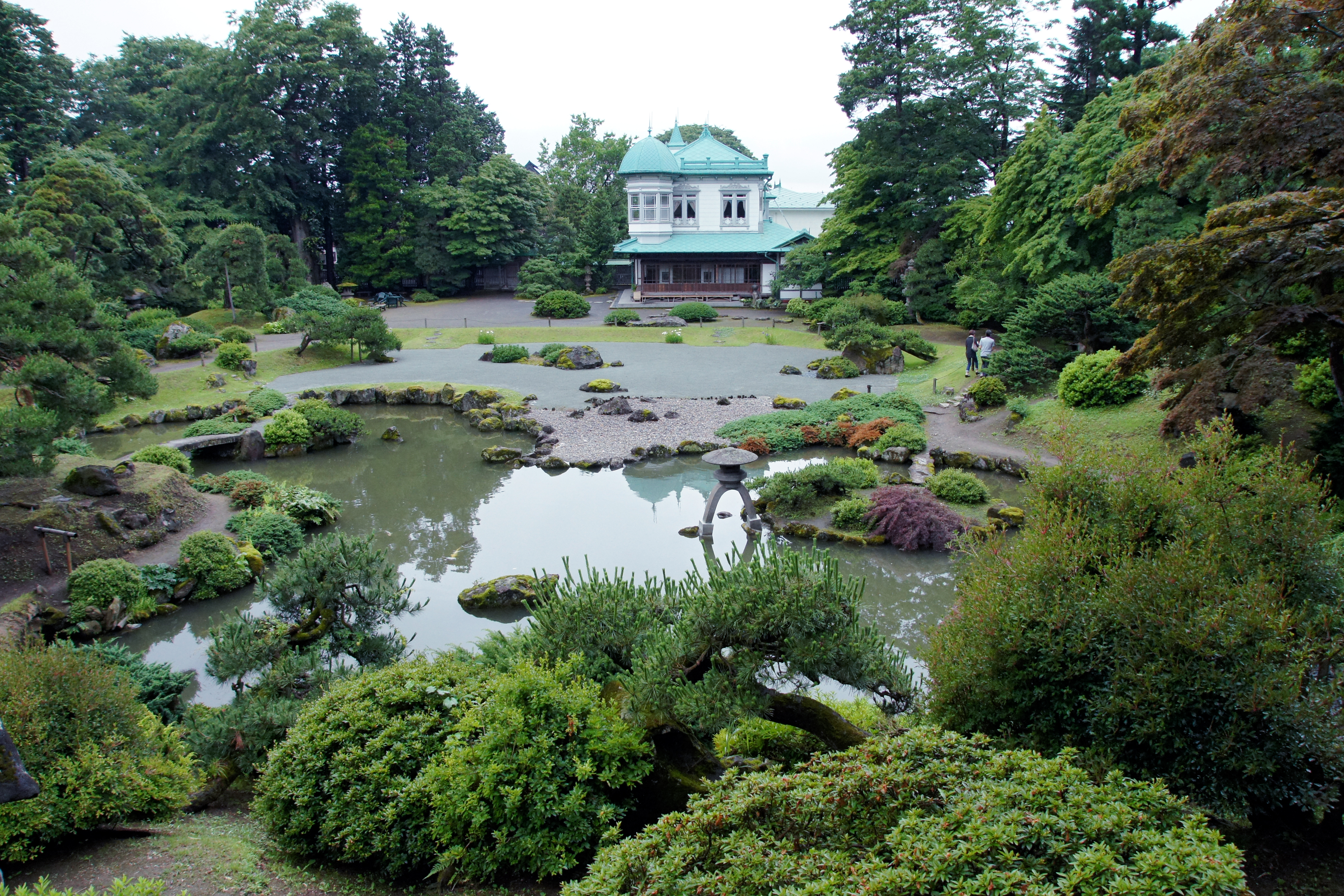
Seibi-en

The song premiered on Radio Disney on February 1, with its release on iTunes on February 2, 2012. In an interview with Kidzworld about what the song is about, Mendler explained, "It's not based on personal experience but I think the whole summertime, kind of cheerful, innocent thing was relatable for the movie and something they liked. The movie is about imagery and there are some good images in that song."

The music video premiered on Disney Channel on January 10. It was directed by Art Spigel, director of the Disney Channel Games, and was filmed on-location at Disney's Golden Oak Ranch in Los Angeles, California.

===== Track listings =====
- U.S. / Digital Download
1. "Summertime" (Digital Download) – 3:01

===== Charts =====
Chart (2012)	Peak position
US Kid Digital Songs (Billboard)	8

===== Release history =====
Country	Date	Format	Label
United States	February 2, 2012	Digital download	Hollywood Records

== Themes and analysis ==
=== Scale and space ===
Scholarly analysis of The Secret World of Arrietty has emphasized the film's focus on scale and spatial relationships. A study by Zeynep Fatma Niğdeli and Merve Karaoğlu Can identified "human scale" as the dominant theme, noting that the Borrowers are coded more frequently than the full-sized humans, with Arrietty and Sho emerging as the most prominent characters. Their interaction highlights the film's central concern with coexistence between different worlds.

Space is another key element: the narrative shifts between the human house and the Borrowers' miniature dwelling, with the kitchen, larder, and children's room receiving particular emphasis. The Borrowers' living room also serves as the central site of family interaction. Everyday objects, such as sewing materials and kitchen utensils, further accentuate the contrast in scale. The needle, first borrowed by Arrietty and later used as a defensive tool, is especially significant.

Animals and plants reinforce these themes. Insects and the cat Niya mark the dangers and alliances faced by the Borrowers, while Arrietty's attachment to leaves and flowers underscores her connection to nature.

=== Globalization and cultural identity ===
Cultural studies scholar Robert Hyland situates the film within debates about globalization and cultural hybridity. The adaptation from Mary Norton's The Borrowers is seen as negotiating between European source material and Japanese cultural traditions, resulting in what sociologist Koichi Iwabuchi calls "cultural deodorization", a masking of Japaneseness for global markets. However, Hyland argues that rather than being stateless (mukokuseki), the film is "culturally informed": it reflects the tensions between local identity and global exchange. Elements such as Aunt Sadako's Western-style kitchen or the lavish doll's house evoke European consumer culture and colonial values of separation, contrasting with the Borrowers' Shinto-like domestic harmony.

At the same time, the film integrates Japanese cultural specificity. The housekeeper Haru refers to the Borrowers as kobito, a Shinto folkloric term with supernatural overtones absent from Norton's text, which reframes them in a local mythological register. Visually, Yonebayashi employs both Impressionist-inspired techniques (blurred garden scenes reminiscent of Monet) and hyperrealist detail in close-ups of plants and insects, blending Western and Japanese aesthetic idioms.

== Release ==
Arrietty was first released in Japanese cinemas on July 17, 2010, by Toho. The film was officially released at a ceremony attended by the film's cast and Yonebayashi. Corbel performed the film's theme song at the event. In addition, Yonebayashi hinted that he wanted the film to beat the record of over 12 million audiences set by previous Studio Ghibli film, Ponyo. The film was screened in 447 theaters throughout Japan during its debut weekend.

In the United Kingdom, the film was released on July 29, 2011, by Optimum Releasing. The film was released by Walt Disney Studios Motion Pictures under the Walt Disney Pictures banner in the United States on February 17, 2012, with the title The Secret World of Arrietty. The North American dub was directed by Gary Rydstrom, produced by Frank Marshall and Kathleen Kennedy and written by Karey Kirkpatrick.

A screening of the North American release was held on January 21, 2012, in New York City. The film opened in 1,522 screens during its general release.

A newly restored 4K edition of Arrietty is slated to screen exclusively in IMAX across the United States and Canada, beginning on May 19, 2026. Both subtitled Japanese-language and English-dub versions are available.

=== Home media ===
Arrietty was released as part of the Studio Ghibli Collection by Disney Japan in both Blu-ray Disc and DVD formats within Japan. The DVD version of the film consists of two discs in the region 2 format. The Blu-ray version consists of a single disc in the Region A format. Both versions were released in Japan on June 17, 2011, and both contain English and Japanese subtitles.

StudioCanal (previously known as Optimum Releasing) released the movie on both Region 2 DVD and Region B Blu-ray format in the United Kingdom on January 9, 2012. A DVD/Blu-ray Double Play "Collector's Edition" was also released, featuring art cards.

The film was released by Walt Disney Studios Home Entertainment on DVD and as a Blu-ray and DVD combo pack on May 22, 2012, in North America. GKIDS re-issued the movie on Blu-ray and DVD on November 21, 2017, under a new deal with Studio Ghibli. The American Blu-ray releases of the film including the American English dub and the original Japanese audio tracks, but do not include the British English dub.

== Reception ==
=== Box office ===
Arrietty earned $19,202,743 in North America and $126,368,084 in other territories for a worldwide total of $145,570,827. It is the fourth-highest grossing anime film in the United States, and the highest not based on a game franchise.

Arrietty debuted at the first position in the Japanese box office. More than one million people went to see the film during its opening weekend. It grossed around 1.35 billion yen that weekend. Distributor Toho announced that as of August 5, 2010, the film managed to gross more than 3.5 billion yen and attracted more than 3.7 million viewers. According to the Motion Picture Producers Association of Japan, Arrietty is the top-grossing Japanese film in their box office for the year for 2010; it grossed approximately 9.25 billion yen ($110.0 million).

In France, the film was well received by the public. More than 100,000 people watched the film on its debut week in France, allowing the film to gross more than US$1.4 million that week. Overall, ticket sales for Arrietty, le petit monde des chapardeurs in France totaled almost 740,000 between its release on January 12, 2011, and March 1, 2011. In the United Kingdom, the film generated £76,000 ($120,232) in its first weekend.

In North America, Arrietty opened on 1,522 theaters, a record for a Studio Ghibli film. The film opened in ninth place with $6.45 million during the three-day President's Day weekend and went on to earn $8.68 million during the four-day weekend, behind the 3D release of Star Wars: Episode I – The Phantom Menace. This was the largest opening ever for a Studio Ghibli film (beating Ponyo's $3.6 million). The film also scored the best weekend per-theater average in North America for the studio ($4,235 against Ponyo's $3,868). Arrietty closed in theaters on June 8, 2012, with $19 million. In total earnings, its highest-grossing countries outside Japan and North America were France ($7.01 million), South Korea ($6.86 million) and Hong Kong ($1.75 million).

=== Critical reception ===
On review aggregator Rotten Tomatoes, the film holds an approval rating of 94% based on 150 reviews, with an average rating of 7.7/10. The website's critics consensus reads, "Visually lush, refreshingly free of family-friendly clatter, and anchored with soulful depth, The Secret World of Arrietty lives up to Studio Ghibli's reputation." On Metacritic, the film has a weighted average score of 80 out of 100, based on 28 critics, indicating "generally favorable reviews".

Cristoph Mark of The Daily Yomiuri praised the film, calling it "likely a perennial favorite among children". He particularly liked the film effects, which he described as "Drops of water loom large and drip like syrup; the ticking of a clock reverberates through the floor and the theater's speakers; tissue paper is large and stiff ...", adding that these effects gives the audience "a glimpse into their own world, but from a different perspective". Mark Schilling of The Japan Times gave the film a rating of four out of five stars, and said that the film "speaks straight to the heart and imagination of [everyone]." Schilling also praised the film's animation, saying that [Studio Ghibli animators] are past masters at creating the illusion of presence and depth without [3-D effects]. However, he also said that in some scenes the film "threatens to devolve into the sappy, the preachy, and the slapsticky" but noted that these scenes were "mercifully brief".

Steve Rose, the reviewer for The Guardian, gave the film four out of five stars, describing it as "a gentle and entrancing tale, deeper and richer than more instantly gratifying fare." Rose also described the film as "the soul food of the animation world", however, he did note that this film "doesn't match previous hits such as Spirited Away or Princess Mononoke in terms of epic scale or adult appeal", even though it bears many of their hallmarks: bright, detailed animation. Deborah Young of The Hollywood Reporter gave a positive review of the film. She said that the film "remains essentially a film for children". Young later went on to say that the relationship with Sho and Arrietty "touches the heartstrings with gentle yearning", and praised Yonebayashi for its direction. In the opening remarks made by David Gritten of The Telegraph, he said that the film was "ravishingly colourful and textured". He also praised the animation, saying that "animation doesn't get better than Arrietty." Gritten gave the film a rating of 4 stars out of 5 stars. In his review for Special Broadcasting Service, Don Groves gave a mixed review of the film and said that Arrietty was a "very slender, minor work." Groves also criticized the film's storyline, calling it "a gentle, humourless, uncomplicated tale of friendship in an alien environment." However, he praised the voice acting as "generally is as professional as [one would] expect." Groves gave the film a rating of 3.5 stars out of 5 stars.

Zac Bertschy of Anime News Network gave the North American version of Arrietty an overall grade of "B". Bertschy praised the voice acting in the film and also praised the intricate details of the film's backgrounds, but said that "there isn't more going on here, even when it comes to the film's basic story", however, he later went on to say that it is "foolish to deny the simple, warm, and familiar pleasures of Arrietty's world". Leslie Felperin of Variety praised the film as "old school, mostly in a good way." She also praised the film for its animation, as well as Yonebayashi's direction. Felperin noted however, that the film lacked its "approach to storytelling that made Studio Ghibli's other [films] so compelling." Manohla Dargis of The New York Times praised the film for its hand-drawn animation and Yonebayashi's direction. Dargis later went on to say that the film has "a way of taking [the audience] where [they] may not expect." Kenneth Turan of the Los Angeles Times described the film as "beautiful, gentle and pure". Turan also praised the detail and animation in the film, as well as its storyline. He also praised Karey Kirkpatrick and Gary Rydstrom for their adaptation of the film, as well as their casting decisions for the British and North American versions. Lisa Schwarzbaum, the reviewer for Entertainment Weekly, gave the film a "B+" and praised Arrietty for its animation. Schwarzbaum later went on to say that the result is a "dreamy, soft-edge hybrid, equally interested in observing raindrops and the worries of a race of minuscule beings."

=== Accolades ===
Year	Award	Category	Recipient	Result
2011	34th Japan Academy Prize	Animation of the Year		Won
2011	10th Tokyo Anime Awards	Animation of the Year		Won
2012	25th Chicago Film Critics Association Awards	Best Animated Feature		Nominated
2012	14th Golden Tomato Awards	Best Reviewed Animated Film		Won
2012	16th Online Film Critics Society Awards	Best Animated Feature		Nominated
2012	10th International Cinephile Society Awards	Best Animated Feature		Won
2012	13th Golden Trailer Awards	Best Anime Trailer	Walt Disney Studios Motion Pictures; Trailer Park	Won
2012	13th Golden Trailer Awards	Best Foreign Animation/Family Trailer	Studio Canal; The Films Editors	Won
2012	13th Golden Trailer Awards	The Don LaFontaine Award for Best Voice Over	Studio Canal	Won
2012	13th Golden Trailer Awards	Best Foreign Animation/Family Trailer	Walt Disney Studios Motion Pictures; Trailer Park	Nominated
2013	21st MovieGuide Awards	Best Film for Families		Nominated

== Merchandise ==
=== Comics ===
Arrietty was adapted into a Japanese manga series. The adaptation was first published by Tokuma Shoten Publishing Co., Ltd. within Japan, and was released in four separate volumes. Viz Media released the English version of the manga within North America in January 2012.

==== Volume list ====
No.	Original release date	Original ISBN	North America release date	North America ISBN
1	August 7, 2010	978-4197701544	February 7, 2012	1-4215-4116-5
2	August 31, 2010	978-4197701551	February 7, 2012	1-4215-4117-3
3	September 8, 2010	978-4197701568	—	—
4	September 25, 2010	978-4197701575	—	—

== See also ==
- Arthur and the Minimoys
- Epic
- FernGully: The Last Rainforest
- Watership Down
