= The Shoe Bird =

1964 children's novel by Eudora Welty

- First edition (publ. Harcourt Brace); Cover art by Beth Krush
- Author: Eudora Welty
- Language: English
- Publication date: 1964

The Shoe Bird is a 1964 children's novel by American writer Eudora Welty. The novel tells the story of a parrot in a shoe store, as he talks to other birds about shoes. Welty, who had never written any children's literature before, wrote it to satisfy a contractual obligation with her publisher Harcourt Brace and to pay for a new roof on her house.

An orchestral ballet was composed by Lehman Engel and performed by the Jackson Ballet Guild in 1968. A 2002 choral piece was also commissioned by the Mississippi Boy Choir and composed by composer Samuel Jones.

== Reception ==
Reception of the novel was mixed, with critic Nancy Hardgrove calling most reviews in major publications "cordial but restrained". However, reception amongst children's literature commentators was largely negative. Kirkus Reviews described the novel as uneventful: "Practically no action occurs during the lengthy discussion, which consists almost entirely of a stream of witticisms, many of which are irrelevant." The review concludes wryly "the overly wordy result is so obscure that readers are likely to want to leave dictionaries as well as shoes to the birds."
