= A Bit of Light (2022 film) =

2022 film directed by Stephen Moyer

- Theatrical release poster
- Directed by: Stephen Moyer
- Screenplay by: Rebecca Callard
- Based on: A Bit of Light by Rebecca Callard
- Produced by: Isabelle Georgeaux; Phin Glynn; Axel Kuschevatzky; Stephen Moyer; Anna Paquin
- Starring: Anna Paquin; Ray Winstone; Pippa Bennett-Warner; Youssef Kerkour
- Cinematography: Peter Allibone
- Edited by: Todd Sandler
- Music by: Nathan Barr
- Production companies: Infinity Hill; Great Point Media; ICM Partners; Pont Neuf Productions; Shorelight Pictures
- Distributed by: Quiver Distribution (United States); April Snow Films (United Kingdom)
- Release dates: 16 November 2022 (Raindance); 5 April 2024 (United States)
- Running time: 98 minutes
- Countries: United Kingdom; United States
- Language: English

A Bit of Light is a 2022 drama film directed by Stephen Moyer and written by Rebecca Callard. It stars Anna Paquin, Ray Winstone, Pippa Bennett-Warner and Youssef Kerkour. It is based on the stage play of the same by Callard.

The film was released in the United States on 5 April 2024.

== Premise ==
Recovering alcoholic Ella ends up moving back in with her father, Alan, while losing custody of her daughters.

== Cast ==
- Anna Paquin as Ella
- Ray Winstone as Alan
- Pippa Bennett-Warner as Bethan
- Youssef Kerkour as Joseph

== Production ==
In October 2021, it was reported that a drama film directed by Stephen Moyer and written by Rebecca Callard titled A Bit of Light, which had completed principal photography in the United Kingdom, with Anna Paquin and Ray Winstone cast in the lead roles as Ella and Alan, alongside Pippa Bennett-Warner as Bethan and Youssef Kerkour as Joseph.

== Release ==
A Bit of Light premiered at the 2022 Raindance Film Festival. It was released in the United States on 5 April 2024.

== Reception ==
On the review aggregator website Rotten Tomatoes, 57% of 7 critics' reviews are positive.

On Film Threat, Michael Talbot-Haynes scored the film a 7.5/10 writing in his review consensus section: "brings an electricity onscreen which hums in the air". Peyton Robinson of RogerEbert.com rated it 1,5/4 stars writing that the film is "creatively unremarkable, with uninspired visuals and editing that play like a workshop in flashbacks and cool-versus-warm emotional motifs."

On Common Sense Media, Kat Halstead wrote that "it's heart-wrenching to see Ella's struggles to stay sober and find hope, but Winstone's turn as her patient, frustrated, but ultimately loving father injects much-needed warmth into her journey."

== See also ==
- List of drama films of the 2020s
- List of British films of 2022
- List of American films of 2022
