= Daniel Newman (British actor) =

British actor (born 1976)

- Born: 12 May 1976 (age 50); York, England
- Occupation: Actor
- Years active: 1985–present

Profile picture of British actor Daniel Newman

Daniel Christopher Newman (born 12 May 1976) is a British actor.

== Selected filmography ==
Film
Year	Title	Role	Notes
1994	Shopping	Monkey	Credited as Danny Newman
1991	Robin Hood: Prince of Thieves	Wulf	Daniel Newman

TV
Year	Title	Role	Notes
1998	Midsomer Murders	Tom Carter	
1997	The Lily Savage Show	Jason Savage	
1997	Touching Evil	Vince Wilson	
1996	A Touch of Frost	Steve Marson	
1995	Absolutely Fabulous	Saffy's son	
1992	The Borrowers	Spiller	
1993	The Return of the Borrowers	Spiller	

== Awards ==
- Best Young Actor Co-Starring in a Motion Picture (1991)
