= Youssef Kerkour =

Moroccan-British actor

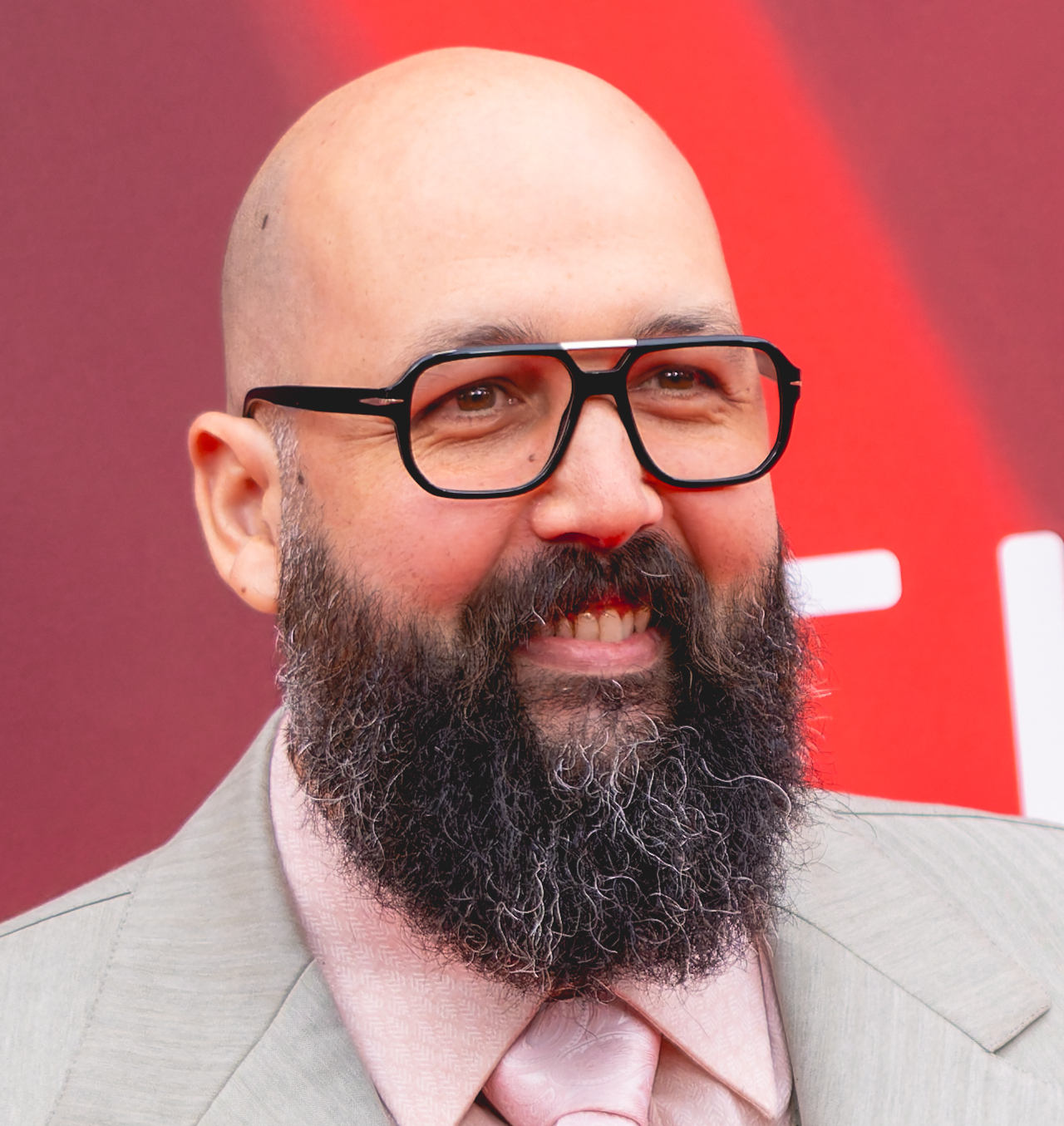
- Kerkour in 2024
- Born: 9 June 1978 (age 48); Rabat, Morocco
- Citizenship: Morocco, United Kingdom
- Occupation: Actor
- Years active: 2001–present

Youssef Kerkour (born 9 June 1978) is a Moroccan-British actor. He is best known for portraying Syrian refugee Sami in the comedy-drama series Home (2019–2020), for which he was nominated at the 2020 British Academy Television Awards, and Steely Pate in the fantasy drama series A Knight of the Seven Kingdoms (2026).

== Early life and education ==
Kerkour grew up in Rabat, Morocco. His father was a Moroccan mathematics professor and his mother an English schoolteacher; they had met in France in the 1960s and moved together to Morocco. As a child, Kerkour loved to sing and dance, and idolised Bruce Lee after his father took him to a screening of the film Enter the Dragon. In his early teens, Kerkour took a school trip to Stratford-upon-Avon, England, the home town of William Shakespeare, and attended a production of Henry V; he credits this experience with inspiring his love of acting.

Kerkour moved to the United States to study psychology at Bard College, but spent much of his time taking dance and acting classes instead. He began pursuing an acting career at the encouragement of a university professor.

== Career ==
In 2001, Kerkour played The Visitor in a production of the Steve Martin play Picasso at the Lapin Agile.

Unable to obtain a visa to remain in the United States, Kerkour moved to England and continued his acting career. He spent two years at the London Academy of Music and Dramatic Art, and five years with the Royal Shakespeare Company.

Kerkour starred in the comedy-drama TV series Home, which debuted in March 2019 and lasted for two series. In the series, he played Sami Ibrahim, a Syrian asylum seeker who moves in with a middle-class English family. The role was based on the experiences of real-ife Syrian refugee Hassan Akkad. Kerkour had not expected to be cast as Sami, since it was such a departure from the typecast violent characters he would usually play. In 2020, he said:

"I spent my life playing terrorists. That's my USP, that's why I grew my beard. I'm a very big guy. I speak Arabic, so a big bearded Arabic man, there's really one kind of part, traditionally. [Playing] Sami is the first time somebody has taken the chance and given me something more."

For his role as Sami, Kerkour was nominated for Best Male Comedy Performance at the 2020 British Academy Television Awards, losing the award to Jamie Demetriou (for Stath Lets Flats). In 2021, Kerkour starred in Ridley Scott film House of Gucci, playing the role of Iraqi Turkmen financier Nemir Kirdar. He has a role in Scott's 2023 historical drama Napoleon, alongside Joaquin Phoenix. Kerkour is slated to appear in a film adaptation of The Alchemist, alongside Sebastian de Souza and Tom Hollander. In 2026, he portrayed Steely Pate in the HBO series A Knight of the Seven Kingdoms.

== Personal life ==
As of July 2021, Kerkour is married, with a two-year-old daughter. He has described himself as a "notorious coffee drinker" in the cafes of Soho.

== Filmography ==
Key
†	Denotes works that have not yet been released

=== Film ===
Year	Title	Role	Notes	Ref.
2004	American Tale	Nate Collins	Short film	
2006	Cross Eyed	Ernie		
2006	Infinite Justice	Drunk G.I.		
2006	The Discipline of D.E.	Bartender / Drunkard / Cop	Short film	
2010	Idle-Hands	Achilles	Short film	
2011	360	Policeman Phoenix (Morgue)		
2011	The Lighter	Boris	Short film	
2013	Hummingbird	Bouzanis		
2013	Side by Side	Dark Knight		
2017	Lost in London	Winston the Bouncer		
2018	Another Day of Life	Farrusco		
2019	Close	Mr Kabila		
2019	Hamsbury Book Club	George	Short film	
2021	Ron's Gone Wrong	Additional voices		
2021	House of Gucci	Nemir Kirdar		
2021	Pirates	Uncle Ibbs		
2022	A Bit of Light	Joseph		
2023	Matar	Jameel		
2023	Napoleon	Marshal Davout		
2025	Steve	Owen		
2025	The Actor	Black Jack / Ed / Defense Attorney / Bus driver		
2026	The Gallerist	TBA		

=== Television ===
Year	Title	Role	Notes	Ref.
2006	The Path to 9/11	Red / Abouhalima	2 episodes	
2007	Holby City	Jalil Amara	Episode: "Someone to Watch Over Me"	
2013	Royal Shakespeare Company: Richard II	Lord Willoughby	Television film	
2014	Royal Shakespeare Company: Henry IV Part I	Westmoreland	Television film	
2014	Royal Shakespeare Company: Henry IV Part II	Westmoreland	Television film	
2014	Royal Shakespeare Company: The Two Gentlemen of Verona	Eglamour, Sir	Television film	
2016	Marcella	Hassan El-Sayed	2 episodes	
2017	Doctors	Jamahl Habib	Episode: "It's Strange"	
2017	Strike Back	Sabil Adiz	Episode: "Retribution: Part 1"	
2017	Bounty Hunters	Youssef	3 episodes	
2018	Jack Ryan	Mr Sadik	Episode: "End of Honor"	
2018	Nightflyers	Hartley Suczek	3 episodes	
2019	Criminal: UK	Jay Muthassin	Episode: "Jay"	
2019	Gavin & Stacey	Emlyn	Episode: "A Special Christmas"	
2019–2020	Home	Sami	12 episodes	
2020	Dracula	Olgaren	Episode: "Blood Vessel"	
2020	Sex Education	Nathan	Episode #2.5	
2020	Baghdad Central	Karl	6 episodes	
2020	Cursed	Pellam	3 episodes	
2020	Worzel Gummidge	Farmer Brawn	Episode: "Saucy Nancy"	
2021	0121	Mr Simmons	Miniseries	
2021	Domina	Maecenas	3 episodes	
2021	Stay Close	Fester	6 episodes	
2022	Murder, They Hope	Bob	Episode: "A Midsummer Night's Scream"	
2022	Doctor Who: The Seventh Doctor Adventures	Agrandir (voice)	Episode: "London Orbital"	
2023	Man Like Mobeen	Megalodon	4 episodes	
2023	Significant Other	Sam	6 episodes	
2023	Death in Paradise	Dave Chadwick	Episode: "Christmas Special"	
2024	We Might Regret This	Baker	Episode: "Series 1, Episode 3"	
2024	Disclaimer	Richard Perkins	Episode: "I"	
2025	Lockerbie	Nabil	1 episode	
2026	A Knight of the Seven Kingdoms	Steely Pate	3 episodes	
2026	Ride or Die	Brian	1 episode	
TBA	Assassin's Creed	TBA	Recurring role	

=== Video games ===
Year	Title	Role	Ref.
2003	Conflict: Desert Storm II	US Foley, US Sgt. Arnold	
2004	Street Racing Syndicate	Voice	
2020	Assassin's Creed Valhalla	French Militant	
2021	Assassin's Creed Valhalla – The Siege of Paris	Voice	
2023	Saltsea Chronicles	Jayantha / Miquel / QA (voice)	
2024	Prince of Persia: The Lost Crown	Orod / Deserter / Erlik (voice)	
