= The Borrowers (1973 film) =

1973 American children's television film

- The Borrowers (1973) DVD Cover
- Genre: Family; Fantasy
- Based on: The Borrowers by Mary Norton
- Written by: Jay Presson Allen
- Directed by: Walter C. Miller
- Starring: Eddie Albert; Tammy Grimes; Judith Anderson
- Music by: Rod McKuen
- Country of origin: United States
- Original language: English

Production
- Executive producers: Duane C. Bogie; Robert Kline
- Producers: Walt deFaria; Warren Lockhart
- Production location: Whitby, Ontario
- Running time: 81 min.
- Production companies: 20th Century Fox Television; Charles M. Schulz Creative Associates; Foote, Cone and Belding Productions; Hallmark Hall of Fame Productions; Walt DeFaria Productions

Original release
- Network: NBC
- Release: December 14, 1973

The Borrowers is a Hallmark Hall of Fame TV special first broadcast in 1973 on NBC. The movie script was adapted from the 1952 Carnegie Medal-winning first novel of author Mary Norton's The Borrowers series: The Borrowers. The film stars Eddie Albert, Tammy Grimes and Judith Anderson. It was directed by Walter C. Miller.

In 1974, the special was awarded an Emmy for Outstanding Individual Achievement in Children's Programming and was nominated for Outstanding Children's Special (producers Duane Bogie, Walt deFaria and Warren Lockhart), Outstanding Individual Achievement in Children's Programming (performer Judith Anderson), Outstanding Individual Achievement in Children's Programming (performer Juul Haalmeyer) and Outstanding Individual Achievement in Children's Programming (director Walter C. Miller).

The special tells the story of the Clock Family, tiny people who live under the floorboards in a Victorian-era English house.

This movie is presently in the public domain.

== Plot ==
In a 19th-century English manor, the bedridden matriarch Sophy spends her time continually fortified with wine. She is attended by a strict housekeeper and an elderly groundskeeper. They are unaware of the few-centimeters-tall Clock family of "borrowers" who have set up residence under the mansion's floorboards. The miniature family survives on various items which the father, Pod Clock, manages to lift during unseen expeditions aboveboard. Sophy is actually aware of Pod, but, aware of her alcoholism, decides he is a delusion.

All is well, until Sophy is required to temporarily house her 8-year-old great nephew. The boy happens to spot Mr Clock during a raid on a dollhouse, and he begins a series of events (including releasing a ferret under the floor to catch the tiny inhabitants) which causes the borrowers to flee into the countryside. However, they are eventually saved by a friendship which develops between the borrowers' daughter, Arrietty, and the boy, who becomes the family's ally.

== Cast ==
- Eddie Albert as Pod Clock
- Tammy Grimes as Homily Clock
- Dame Judith Anderson as Great Aunt Sophy
- Karen Pearson as Arrietty Clock
- Dennis Larson as The Boy
- Beatrice Straight as Mrs. Crampfurl
- Barnard Hughes as Mr. Crampfurl

== Awards and reception ==
Emmy Awards

- 1974 Outstanding Individual Achievement in Children's Programming (Won)
- 1974 Outstanding Children's Special (producers Duane Bogie, Walt deFaria and Warren Lockhart) (Nominated)
- 1974 Outstanding Individual Achievement in Children's Programming (performer Judith Anderson) (Nominated)
- 1974 Outstanding Individual Achievement in Children's Programming (costume designer Juul Haalmeyer) (Nominated)
- 1974 Outstanding Individual Achievement in Children's Programming (director Walter C. Miller) (Nominated)

Reviewers generally found the movie a good message for its intended audience of young viewers, but a mediocre watch for adult tastes. One wrote: "(The) teleplay follows a delightful path as the Clock family wriggles free of trouble, and the values that Pod [the Clock family patriarch] represents — as compared to the fearfulness and small-mindedness of the story’s normal-sized grown-ups — comprise a lovely message for young viewers." Another wrote: "Eddie Albert plays his father character a little too broadly for my tastes. Overall, I wasn’t too impressed with either the script or the acting. It’s watchable, but could have been a lot better."

== Filming locations ==
- Toad Hall, Whitby, Ontario

== See also ==
- List of films featuring miniature people
