= John Henderson (director) =

English film and television director

- Born: 1949 (age 76–77); England, United Kingdom
- Occupation: Film director

John Henderson (born 1949) is an English film and television director.

Henderson's first directing job was for Spitting Image on ITV, which won him a BAFTA nomination. Henderson's other television credits include the double series The Borrowers, winner of two BAFTAs, the 1999 Comic Relief Doctor Who skit The Curse of Fatal Death (no credit was given to him upon broadcast; however, he was credited and interviewed when the story was released on VHS later that year); two series of the comedy How Do You Want Me?, two series of the BBC sci-fi comedy Hyperdrive, Saxondale, Benidorm and Shameless, including "Spy' which won the Golden Rose for best comedy series.

He has also directed feature films Loch Ness, Bring Me the Head of Mavis Davis, Two Men Went to War and Mee-Shee: The Water Giant. He co-wrote the family-based feature film The Adventures of Greyfriars Bobby, released in 2005. Bring Me the Head of Mavis Davis was entered into the 20th Moscow International Film Festival.. The movie won 'Best Music Performance' at the Sanremo film festival. He directed the film Up All Night based on the CBBC show Friday Download and co-wrote the 1992 Channel 4 comedy Terry and Julian with Julian Clary and Paul Merton.
