= Robert Norton (typographer) =

British typographer (1929–2001)

Robert Norton (1929–2001) was a British publisher, consultant on printing and Microsoft executive.

The son of the children's author Mary Norton, he established the company Photoscript, a phototypesetting technology company, before moving into digital font technology. He later moved to Seattle to take up a position as an executive at Microsoft, advising on fonts to be included with Windows. Many of the release notes accompanying Microsoft typefaces were written by him. While in Washington, he self-published the book Types Best Remembered/Types Best Forgotten on good and bad choices of font.

He married Abigail Scully in the United States and had four children. After retiring from Microsoft in 1997, he ran his fine press brand, the Parsimony Press, in Huntspill, Somerset, in England.
