= The Borrowers (2011 film) =

2011 British children's television film

- Film poster
- Based on: The Borrowers by Mary Norton
- Screenplay by: Ben Vanstone
- Directed by: Tom Harper
- Starring: Stephen Fry; Christopher Eccleston; Aisling Loftus; Charlie Hiscock; Victoria Wood; Sharon Horgan; Robert Sheehan
- Music by: Philip Miller
- Country of origin: United Kingdom
- Original language: English

Production
- Producer: Radford Neville
- Running time: 90 minutes

Original release
- Network: BBC One
- Release: 26 December 2011

The Borrowers is a 2011 British television film starring Stephen Fry, Christopher Eccleston and Victoria Wood, based broadly on Mary Norton's 1952 novel The Borrowers.

== Plot ==
The Clock family are tiny human-like "Borrowers" who live under the floorboards at the Driver–Millman house. The human family's matriarch, Mrs. Driver (Victoria Wood), suspects the Borrowers exist but hasn't detected them while the Millman's grandson, James (Charlie Hiscock), has befriended the Borrower's daughter Arrietty Clock (Aisling Loftus), heightening Mrs. Driver's suspicions. She finds missing items from around the house underneath a floorboard, including furniture from James' dead mother's dollhouse. Mrs. Driver befriends London university Professor Mildeye (Stephen Fry) while researching the "little people" online and he agrees to investigate Mrs. Driver's sightings.

Considering their secret home compromised, the Clocks escape to the sewers. Arrietty's parents, Pod (Christopher Eccleston) and Homily (Sharon Horgan) take her to the disused City Road tube station where a thriving urban community of little people exists. Arrietty is nearly run over by Spiller (Robert Sheehan), a biker-type leader, who Pod hires with gold to guide them to a new home.

Mildeye and his lab assistant Jenny (Anne Hirsch) set traps for the Clocks in the sewers around the Millman-Driver home. Arrietty triggers one, but her parents are captured instead and Spiller drags Arrietty to safety at Pod's request. Mildeye takes the captured Clocks to his lab, but James deletes Mildeye's phone message to his grandmother about the capture. Mrs. Driver berates James' father Robert (Shaun Dooley) for being away from home too much, while concealing the family's mounting debts that threaten their home ownership.

Arrietty and Spiller argue, and he saves her from a street cleaning vehicle when she tries to run off. They find sanctuary in a miniature nativity scene at a church. Spiller reveals why Pod exiled himself from the Borrowers: he had to sacrifice his niece Eggletina to save the Borrower community, making him a reluctant hero. They return to James' house to seek his help.

Professor Mildeye learns the captive Pod and Homily can talk. He prepares to present them to the world at an academic conference. James see the conference announced on the nightly BBC news and flies Spiller and Arrietty fly over the conference venue in a model plane, a Christmas gift from his returned father. They land by parachute and travel through air vents to the lab.

James distracts Mildeye and Jenny by revealing other little people communities, and secretly deploys a remote control car to aid the Borrowers' escape. Mildeye returns to the lab too late to prevent the Clocks' escape. They elude his escape James secrets them away in his rucksack while Jenny tries to catch Spiller in the lab.

The Borrowers watch the conference online, and Mildeye's audience leaves when he can only produce doll's jacket. When James closes the laptop, Spiller (who has sneaked in unseen) asks "Did you really think they'd catch me?" Arrietty admits she likes him, and the embarrassed Spiller claims he only wanted the gold coin. James picks up this rare coin that his Grandmother was asking about before, and sets it on the floor of his mum's bedroom for Mrs. Driver to find. James and Robert sell the coin to raise money for their house and for Christmas. Robert is puzzled why all the strawberry creams are missing from the chocolate tin that Pod had 'borrowed' from.

During the celebration under the floorboards, Pod and Homily grant Arrietty freedom to leave. She chooses to return to the Borrower city with Spiller. In a post-credits scene, Mrs. Driver slips a strawberry cream chocolate down the Borrower hole and wishes them a Merry Christmas.

== Cast ==
=== Borrowers ===
- Christopher Eccleston as father Pod Clock.
- Sharon Horgan as mother Homily Clock.
- Aisling Loftus as daughter Arrietty Clock.
- Robert Sheehan as Spiller.
- Francis Chouler as Spiller's Mate.

=== "Beans" (human beings) ===
- Charlie Hiscock as James Millman, the boy who finds the Borrowers
- Victoria Wood as Mrs Driver, James' grandmother
- Shaun Dooley as Robert Millman, James' father
- Stephen Fry as Professor Mildeye
- Anne Hirsch as Jenny, Professor Mildeye's assistant

== See also ==
- List of films featuring miniature people
