= The Borrowers (1997 film) =

1997 film by Peter Hewitt

- Theatrical release poster
- Directed by: Peter Hewitt
- Screenplay by: Gavin Scott; John Kamps
- Based on: The Borrowers by Mary Norton
- Produced by: Tim Bevan; Eric Fellner; Rachel Talalay
- Starring: John Goodman; Jim Broadbent; Mark Williams; Hugh Laurie; Bradley Pierce
- Cinematography: John Fenner; Trevor Brooker
- Edited by: David Freeman
- Music by: Harry Gregson-Williams
- Production company: Working Title Films
- Distributed by: PolyGram Films
- Release dates: 5 December 1997 (UK); 13 February 1998 (U.S.)
- Running time: 87 minutes
- Countries: United Kingdom; United States
- Language: English
- Budget: $29 million
- Box office: $54 million

The Borrowers is a 1997 British fantasy comedy film directed by Peter Hewitt and starring John Goodman, Jim Broadbent, Celia Imrie, Mark Williams, Hugh Laurie and Bradley Pierce. It is loosely based on the 1952 children's novel of the same name by Mary Norton.

When the film was released in the United Kingdom, it opened at No. 2, behind Alien Resurrection. The next week, the film retained the position, though under Tomorrow Never Dies. The film received generally positive reviews from critics upon its release, with praise geared towards the visuals and performances, although there was some criticism towards the changes to the story. In 1998, the film was nominated for Best British Film in the British Academy of Film and Television Arts (BAFTA) awards, but lost to Gary Oldman's film Nil by Mouth.

== Plot ==
Young Pete Lender sets up traps throughout his home, explaining to his parents, Joe and Victoria, that small household items, which they believe are simply misplaced, are being stolen. In actuality, the Clock family of tiny people known as "Borrowers" is secretly living in the house, taking things without being seen by "human beans". Lawyer Ocious P. Potter informs the Lenders that he cannot find the will of Victoria's late aunt Mary Alabaster – the family's only evidence that their house rightfully belongs to them – and he has already made plans to demolish their house and build condominiums, forcing the Lenders to move.

Pod Clock and his children, Arrietty and Peagreen, make their way through the kitchen to "borrow" a battery to bring back to his wife, Homily. Arrietty treats herself to ice cream in the freezer, and is accidentally trapped inside as the Lenders return. Pod rescues her via the ice dispenser, but is forced to leave one of his gadgets behind. Later, Arrietty ventures out alone and is eventually caught by Pete. The two of them warm up to each other, and then Pete explains that the house is being demolished due to the absence of the will. Arrietty warns her family and, despite her parents' misgivings, Pod reluctantly agrees and Pete smuggles the Clocks onto the Lenders' moving truck to join them at their new home. Pete repairs and returns Pod's gadget to him, earning his trust. As the truck pulls away, Arrietty and Peagreen accidentally fall out, and make their way back to the house.

Potter soon arrives at the house, and it's revealed that he lied to the Lenders; having a distrust of banks, Mrs. Alabaster had actually hidden her will – officially leaving her property to the family – inside the house. He finds the will in a hidden safe and prepares to burn it to erase all evidence, but Arrietty and Peagreen flee with the document. Discovering the Clocks' home beneath the floorboards, Potter summons Exterminator Jeff to eliminate the Borrowers, and is sprayed with caustic foam and electrocuted in the process. Police Officer Steady responds to the disturbance, but Potter manages to throw off his suspicions while Arrietty and Peagreen escape with the will.

Peagreen accidentally stumbles and falls into an empty milk bottle and is collected and brought back to the dairy, with Potter, Jeff, and Jeff's flatulent bloodhound Mr. Smelly in pursuit, followed by Pete, Pod, and Homily. Spud Spiller, an "outie" Borrower living on the streets, takes Arrietty to the dairy, where Pod rescues Peagreen from the assembly line. Potter captures the Borrowers and leaves them to drown in liquid cheese. Spiller taunts Potter, who drops him in a machine, seemingly killing him, and departs with the will. Pete arrives and saves the Clocks just in time. Jeff, realizing Potter's schemes, has a change of heart and drives them to City Hall to help stop Potter from arranging the house’s demolition.

In retaliation for Potter's rudeness, the City Hall clerk gives him long and confusing directions. After a series of mishaps, he reaches the demolitions office, where he is confronted by Jeff and Pete, but he pushes them out of the way. He then enters the office, only to find himself tricked and locked in a supply room. The Clocks tie him up with electrical tape, but he breaks free and recaptures them. Before Potter can vacuum up the family, Spiller arrives with an army of Borrowers who subdue him, and Pod delivers a warning to Potter on behalf of all Borrowers. As Pete and Jeff arrive with Officer Steady, the Borrowers immediately disappear. Pete shows Steady the will, proving Potter's plan to cheat the Lenders out of their house, and Potter is promptly arrested.

The Lenders move back into their home, as do the Clocks, now with food and assistance from Pete. As the Clocks enjoy the company of their old Borrower friends, Minty Branch, Swag Moss and Dustbunny Bin, Arrietty and Spiller sneak away to ride his aerosol paint-propelled roller skate.

During the pre-credits, the now mentally off-kilter Potter attempts to explain the existence of the Borrowers, only for the whole station – both cops and convicts – to laugh at him uproariously. The film closes with Potter getting his mugshots taken (which he actually seems to enjoy).

== Cast ==
- John Goodman as Ocious P. Potter, a crooked lawyer who seeks to destroy the Lender family's house in order to build condominiums.
- Bradley Pierce as Pete Lender, a boy who befriends the Clock family.
- Mark Williams as Exterminator Jeff, an exterminator who reluctantly helps Potter, but willingly helps Pete later on.
- Jim Broadbent as Pod Clock, the patriarch of the Clock family.
- Celia Imrie as Homily Clock, the matriarch of the Clock family.
- Flora Newbigin as Arrietty Clock, the daughter of Pod and Homily.
- Tom Felton as Peagreen Clock, the son of Pod and Homily.
- Raymond Pickard as Spiller, an "outie" Borrower
- Hugh Laurie as Officer Steady, a local police officer who becomes suspicious of Potter's motives.
- Aden Gillett and Doon Mackichan as Joe and Victoria Lender, Pete's father and mother.
- Ruby Wax as Town Hall Clerk

== Production ==
Some of the film's scenes were shot on location in the village of Theale, near Reading, Berkshire, where all of the buildings and shops in the High Street were painted dark green.

== Soundtrack ==
The Borrowers (Original Motion Picture Soundtrack)

Film score by Harry Gregson-Williams
- Released: 1997
- Genre: Soundtrack
- Length: 53:10
- Label: Mojo Records

The Borrowers (Original Motion Picture Soundtrack)
No.	Title	Length
1.	"Opening Titles"	1:30
2.	"Pete Helps Out"	2:12
3.	"Ocious P. Potter"	2:35
4.	"Pod's Heroics"	2:10
5.	"Killer Hoover"	0:53
6.	"Arriety's Sadness"	2:52
7.	"A Plan Is Hatched"	2:22
8.	"The Policeman Arrives"	1:30
9.	"Pod Saves Peagreen"	2:00
10.	"Borrower's Galore"	2:00
11.	"Stealing The Will"	3:00
12.	"Hammered"	2:55
13.	"The Borrowers' Revenge"	3:25
14.	"Dairy Montage"	1:00
15.	"Arriety Is Seen And Caught"	1:15
16.	"Life Or Death For Peagreen"	4:18
17.	"Pete To The Rescue"	4:25
18.	"Potter's Entrance"	1:40
19.	"Potter's Angry Now"	1:35
20.	"Under The Floorboards"	1:53
21.	"Jeff The Exterminator"	1:24
22.	"Home & Dry/End Titles"	6:16
Total length:		53:10

== Reception ==
The film received generally positive reviews upon its release. On Rotten Tomatoes the film has an approval rating of 70% based on reviews from 27 critics. The site's consensus states: "Rousing and inventive, The Borrowers is a delightfully spirited children's adventure." Audiences surveyed by CinemaScore gave the film a grade "B+" on scale of A to F.

The Guardian has described the film as "A spirited screen version of the Mary Norton stories about the tiny folk who live under the floorboards, and off human scraps. Jim Broadbent and Celia Imrie are a joy as the parents of little Arrietty..."

Roger Ebert in his review described the film, in the wake of numerous television adaptations, as a "big-screen, big-budget version with special effects so amusing it's like Toy Story has come to life...the charm comes in the way The Borrowers makes its world look like a timeless story book. If the action and the physical humour are designed to appeal to kids, the look of the film will impress adults who know what to look for."

== Home media ==
This film was released on 19 May 1998 on VHS and DVD by PolyGram Video, and on 1 April 2003 on DVD by Universal Pictures Home Entertainment.

== See also ==
- List of films featuring miniature people
