= Joe and Beth Krush =

American husband-and-wife illustrator duo

Joe Krush (May 18, 1918 – March 8, 2022) and Beth Krush (March 31, 1918 – February 2, 2009) were an American husband-and-wife team of illustrators who worked primarily on children's books. They may be known best for the U.S. editions of all five Borrowers books by Mary Norton, published by Harcourt 1953–1961 and 1982, a series inaugurated very early in their careers.

== Life ==
Beth was born March 31, 1918, in Washington, D.C. As a girl she enjoyed visiting the city institutions and special events and drawing at home. Joseph Krush was born May 18, 1918, in Camden, New Jersey, and raised there. As a boy he won some prizes for drawings of boats and planes.

Beth and Joe both studied at the Philadelphia Museum School of Art, where they met on the first day of class. They married during World War II and settled in Wayne, Pennsylvania, south of the city, in 1948. They still lived there when Beth died in 2009 (in Bryn Mawr, Pennsylvania).

Joe had a life-long love of aviation. He designed, built and flew award winning model aircraft from 1930. Joe set numerous indoor freeflight records as a member of the Academy of Model Aeronautics and FAI. He helped organize the Valley Forge Signal Seekers (Pennsylvania) one of oldest Radio Control Model Airplane clubs in the USA. Joe remained active in mentoring students involved with the flying events in Science Olympiad as well as his long-standing art classes on illustrating.

The Krushes had one son, the musician Jay Paul Krush. Joe Krush turned 100 in May 2018, and died on March 8, 2022, at the age of 103.

== Career ==
Joe worked as a graphic designer for O.S.S. during the war. He was a courtroom sketch artist at the Nuremberg Trials 1945–1946. Beth taught illustration and drawing at Moore College of Art in Philadelphia, for at least 15 years.

Both of the Krushes illustrated books that Harcourt, Brace published in 1947. Joe did Windwagon Smith and Other Yarns, a collection of short stories by Wilbur Schramm. Beth did Mr. Doodle by Sally Scott. Sarah Scott Fisher, the daughter of Dorothy Canfield Fisher, was a prolific writer of children's picture books whom Harcourt teamed with multiple illustrators. The Library of Congress online catalog lists 16 Sally Scott and Beth Krush collaborations published from 1947 to 1963.

The Krushes planned to work separately but they helped each other meet deadlines and that collaboration was noticed and approved by editors.

Beside The Borrowers and its sequels, some famous books illustrated jointly by the Krushes were Miracles on Maple Hill (1956) by Virginia Sorensen (who won the Newbery Medal as its writer); Gone-Away Lake and its sequel, by Elizabeth Enright (1957, 1961); and All-of-a-Kind Family Downtown by Sydney Taylor (1972).

Before collaborating with his wife, Joe Krush illustrated the dustjacket and the interior of Huon of the Horn, published by Harcourt in 1951, an adaptation of Huon de Bordeaux that was Andre Norton's first fantasy novel. A few years later he did the same for The Ponder Heart by Eudora Welty, published in 1953/1954.

Beside collaborating with her husband, Beth Krush illustrated The Shoe Bird (1964), the only children's book by Eudora Welty.

There are two collections of Krush papers at the University of Minnesota and one item at the University of Southern Mississippi. All of the materials date from 1964 and earlier.
