= Rebecca Callard =

British actress

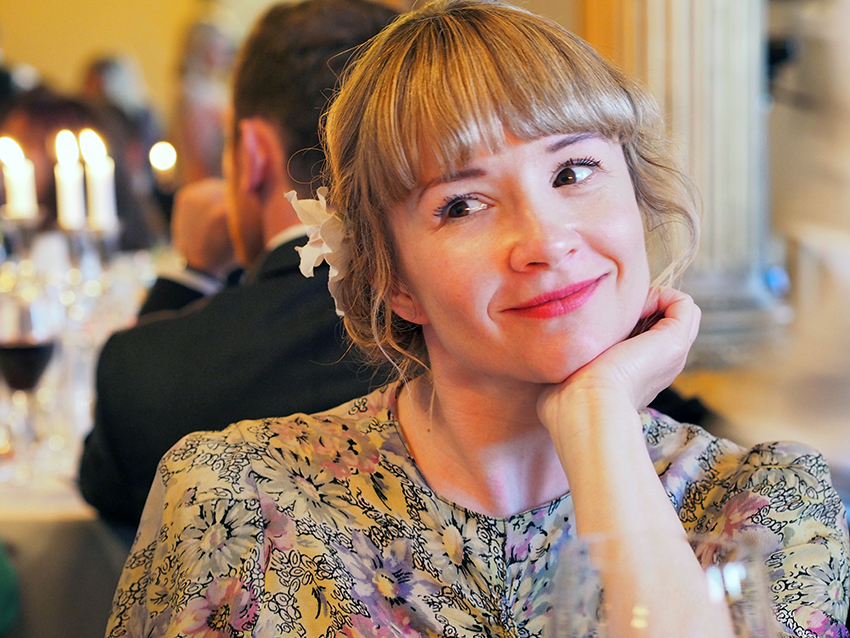
- Born: Rebecca Jayne Atkinson; 3 June 1975 (age 51); Dewsbury, West Yorkshire, England
- Other name: Rebecca Sowden
- Occupation: Actress
- Years active: 1987–present
- Spouse: Gideon Turner (m. 2001; sep. 2016)
- Children: 2
- Parents: Paul Atkinson (father); Beverley Callard (mother)

Rebecca Jayne Callard (née Atkinson, born 3 June 1975) is an English actress and writer.

== Early life ==
Callard was born Rebecca Jayne Atkinson, the only surviving child from her mother Beverley Callard's first marriage to Paul Atkinson. Her parents divorced in 1978, and her mother remarried three times, to David Sowden, Steven Callard, and Jon McEwan. As a young actress, Rebecca was credited in early roles as Rebecca Sowden; she changed her stage name to Rebecca Callard following her mother's 1989 marriage to Steven Callard.

== Career ==
Callard's television roles have included Fiona Brett in Children's Ward, Arrietty Clock in The Borrowers and The Return of the Borrowers, Laura Hutchings in Sunburn, Chambermaid Kate Morris in The Grand, and Harriet Marsh in Plotlands. She was also a regular cast member in the BBC Radio 4 comedy series Smelling of Roses, and performed the voice of Tamar in the claymation film The Miracle Maker.

Callard appeared on stage as Juliet at the age of eighteen in Romeo and Juliet, directed by Judi Dench. She played Celia in the UK and US tour of a production of Shakespeare's As You Like It, Rosalind being played by Rebecca Hall. After a four-year break, she returned in 2009 with a production of another Shakespeare play Macbeth at the Royal Exchange Theatre, Manchester, and in a guest-star role in an episode of the television series Robin Hood. In 2011 she played the part of Ruth Walsh in the drama soap Coronation Street.

In 2012, she played Ruth Pulis in the BBC crime drama series Blackout. In 2013 she played Sarah in The Accrington Pals at the Royal Exchange and appeared in the feature film Orthodox also starring Stephen Graham and Michael Smiley.

In 2015, Callard played Grace Wells in the BBC One series Ordinary Lies. She also played a mechanic, Toni, in the BBC Four comedy Detectorists, appearing in the 2015 Christmas special, series 3 (2017) and the 2022 Christmas special.

In February 2016, she appeared in the BBC drama series Moving On. After appearing in the 2017 ITV drama series Fearless, she claimed she was relieved not to have any scenes with its star, Michael Gambon, because she and her younger son, George, are such Harry Potter fans that she would have been tempted to "hound him with questions".

In 2017, she won a commendation from The Bruntwood Prize for her first play, A Bit of Light. Callard served as one of the writers on series 2 and 3 of Breeders for Sky and FX. The screen adaptation of her play (which Callard also wrote), starring Anna Paquin, Ray Winstone, Pippa Bennett-Warner and Youssef Kerkour, was directed by Stephen Moyer, who starred alongside Callard in series 2 of The Grand. As well as working as a voice over artist, Callard has retrained to work as a personal trainer.

== Personal life ==
Callard married actor Gideon Turner in 2001 and they have two children; the couple separated in 2016.

== Selected filmography ==
- How We Used to Live (1987–1988, TV series) – Beverley Bradley, 4 episodes
- Children's Ward (1989, TV series) – Fiona Brett, 13 episodes
- The Wolves of Willoughby Chase (1989) – Emma
- The Borrowers (1992, TV series) – Arrietty Clock
- Bonjour La Classe (1993, TV series) – Lucy Cornwell
- The Return of the Borrowers (1993, TV series) – Arrietty Clock
- It's a Girl (1994, TV movie) – Susan
- Birds of a Feather (1994, TV series) – Kate, 1 episode
- September Song (1994–1995, TV series) – Vicky, 7 episodes
- Chiller (1995, TV series) - Sonja, 1 episode - 'Here Comes the Mirror Man'
- Band of Gold (1996, TV series) – Tula, 4 episodes
- Plotlands (1997, TV series) – Harriet Marsh
- Gold (1997, TV series) – Tula
- The Grand (1997–1998, TV series) – Kate Morris
- The Miracle Maker (1999) – Tamar (voice)
- Sunburn (1999–2000, TV series) – Laura Hutchings
- Lorna Doone (2000, TV movie) – Ruth Huckaback
- 32 Brinkburn Street (2011, TV series) – Gracie, 5 episodes
- Coronation Street (2011, TV series) – Ruth Walsh
- Blackout (2012, TV series) – Ruth Pullis
- Ordinary Lies (2015, TV series) – Grace Wells, 5 episodes
- Le Doone (2015, TV series) – Antonella Riccardi
- To Walk Invisible (2016, TV movie) – Miss Pratchett
- Fearless (2017, TV series) – Annie Peterson
- A Bit of Light (2022, TV movie) – Waitress, as well writer of the film
- Detectorists (2015–2022, TV series) – Toni, 8 episodes
