= The Borrowers (novel) =

1952 children's novel by Mary Norton

- Stanley cover of first edition
- Author: Mary Norton
- Illustrator: Diana L. Stanley (first); Beth and Joe Krush (US)
- Language: English
- Series: The Borrowers
- Genre: Children's fantasy novel
- Publisher: J. M. Dent (first); Harcourt, Brace (US)
- Publication date: 1952 (first); 1953 (US)
- Publication place: United Kingdom
- Media type: Print (hardcover)
- Pages: 159pp (first); 180pp (US)
- OCLC: 7557055
- LC Class: PZ7.N8248 Bd 1952
- Followed by: The Borrowers Afield

The Borrowers is a children's fantasy novel by the British author Mary Norton, published by Dent in 1952. It is the first of five books in The Borrowers series.

It features a family of tiny people who live secretly in the walls and floors of an English house and "borrow" from the big people in order to survive.

The Borrowers won the 1952 Carnegie Medal from the Library Association, recognising the year's outstanding children's book by a British author. In the 70th anniversary celebration of the medal in 2007, it was named one of the top ten Medal-winning works, selected by a panel to compose the ballot for a public election of the all-time favourite.

Harcourt, Brace and Company published it in the U.S. in 1953 with illustrations by Beth and Joe Krush. It was also published in four parts, with illustrations by Erik Blegvad, during the summer of 1953 (June, July, August, September) in Woman's Day magazine. There have been several adaptations of The Borrowers in television and film.

== Plot ==
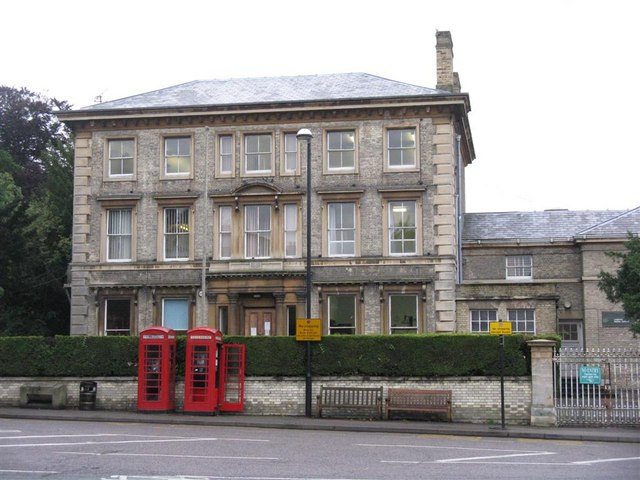
'The Cedars', Norton's home until 1921 and reportedly the setting of The Borrowers

The story begins with a frame story of young Kate crocheting a quilt with her aunt Mrs May. Kate complains that some of her crochet supplies have gone missing and wonders where all the small household items that disappear really end up. Mrs May tells Kate about the Borrowers: miniature human-like creatures who live unseen in houses and "borrow" such items from the "human beans" that live there. She goes on to tell the story of how her younger brother once befriended a young Borrower named Arrietty.

Arrietty Clock lives with her parents Pod and Homily under the floor beneath a grandfather clock. (Borrowers take their surnames from their living place.) One day Pod comes home shaken from a borrowing expedition. After Arrietty goes to bed, Pod tells Homily that he has been seen by a human boy who had been sent from India to live with his great-aunt while recovering from an illness. Remembering the fate of their niece Eggletina, who disappeared after the "human beans" brought a cat into the house, Pod and Homily decide to tell Arrietty. In the course of the ensuing conversation, Homily realizes that Arrietty ought to be allowed to go borrowing with Pod.

Several days later, Pod invites Arrietty to accompany him on a borrowing trip. Since Arrietty has only ever seen the outdoors through a grating, she is allowed to explore the garden, where she meets the Boy. After some trepidation on both their parts, Arrietty and the Boy strike a bargain: the Boy, who is bilingual and slow to learn English, will bring the highly literate Arrietty books if she will read to him. At one point, Arrietty tells the Boy that the world cannot possibly have enough resources to sustain very many humans. He disagrees and tells her that there are millions of people in India alone. Arrietty becomes upset when she realizes she cannot know that there are any Borrowers other than her own family. The Boy offers to take a letter to a badger sett two fields away where her Uncle Hendreary, Aunt Lupy, and their children are supposed to have emigrated.

Meanwhile, Arrietty learns from Pod and Homily that they get a "feeling" when big people approach. Concerned that she had no "feeling" when near the Boy, she practices by going to a passage below the kitchen, which is more frequently trafficked by humans than the rest of the house. There she overhears the cook Mrs Driver and the gardener Crampfurl discussing the Boy. Driver dislikes children in general and believes the Boy is up to no good, particularly when Crampfurl suspects that the Boy is keeping a pet ferret after seeing him in a field calling for "Uncle something."

The Boy delivers Arrietty's letter and returns with a mysterious response asking Arrietty to tell Aunt Lupy to come back. Pod catches Arrietty taking the letter from the Boy and brings her home. After Arrietty confesses everything she has told the Boy, Pod and Homily fear they will be forced to emigrate. The Boy soon finds the Clocks' home and brings them gifts of dollhouse furniture from the nursery. They experience a period of "borrowing beyond all dreams of borrowing" as the Boy returns with gift after gift. In return, Arrietty is allowed to go outside and read to him.

Driver suspects the Boy of stealing after catching him trying to open a curio cabinet full of valuable miniatures. One night she finds Arrietty's house from the bright candle light shining through the floorboards. Believing this is where the Boy cached his stolen goods, Driver peers beneath the boards and is horrified to discover the Borrowers in their home. To prevent the Boy from helping the Borrowers escape, she locks him in his room until it is time for him to return to India. Meanwhile, she hires a rat catcher to fumigate the house in order to trap the Borrowers.

Driver cruelly allows the Boy out of his room so that he can watch when the Borrowers' bodies are found. The Boy manages to escape her and, running outside, he breaks open the grating in hopes of providing an escape route. As he waits for the Borrowers to emerge, the cab arrives to take him away. Driver drags him to the cab and forces him inside, leaving the fate of the Borrowers unknown.

Some time later, the Boy's sister (a young Mrs May) visits the home herself in hopes of proving her brother's stories were real. She leaves small gifts at the badgers' sett, which are gone the next time she checks. Later she finds a miniature memoranda book in which the entire story of the Borrowers has been written, presumably by Arrietty. When Kate rejoices that the book means that the Borrowers survived and that the whole story was true, Mrs May points out that "Arrietty's" handwriting was identical to Mrs May's brother's.

== Characters ==
=== Borrowers ===
Arrietty Clock
An adventurous and curious fourteen-year-old Borrower. She knows how to read, owns a collection of pocket-sized books, and is fascinated with "human beans" after meeting The Boy. She is also the only Borrower educated enough to comprehend that the Borrowers may be dying out. In later books, her interactions with humans frequently cause concern for her parents.
Pod Clock
Arrietty's father. A talented Borrower and a shoemaker who creates button boots out of beads and old kid gloves. He is cautious, but not opposed to new ideas, and a quick inventor and improviser.
Homily Clock
Arrietty's mother, a nervous woman who likes her tidy domestic world and can't bear the thought of hardship or discomfort. Nevertheless, she often shows fortitude in difficult or dangerous situations, though she complains constantly through them. She is extremely proud of Arrietty and encourages her to educate herself through reading. She envies Lupy's elegance and refinement, but dislikes her for putting on airs.
Hendreary Clock
Arrietty's uncle and Pod's brother. He and his family were one of many Borrower families who used to live in the house, but they were eventually forced to leave after Hendreary was "seen." When he finally appears in later books, he is a weary, dispirited man who allows his wife to make all their important decisions.
Lupy Clock
Uncle Hendreary's wife and a distant relation to Homily. She was born Lucy Rain-pipe family, but married into the prestigious Harpsichord family. She has three sons from that former marriage and a stepdaughter, Eggletina. She is prissy, bossy, and domineering.
Eggletina Clock
Hendreary's daughter from his first marriage. Eggletina's family attempted to protect her by lying about the Big House and failed to inform her that her father had been "seen." Unaware of the dangers, Eggletina was also unaware that the "human beans" had brought in a cat. She wandered out to explore and was presumed eaten, though, in the second book, Arrietty learns that she is still alive and that she is a thin, shy girl.
The Overmantels
A family of Borrowers who lived on the drawing-room mantelpiece, they were snobbish and given to airs, but Homily pities them because they were forced to live on nothing but breakfast food and often went hungry. The Overmantels were one of many Borrower families that emigrated once there were too few humans to sustain them.
The Rain-Pipes
A family of Borrowers who lived in a drainpipe, they were considered lower-class because their home was prone to flooding, frequently wiping out all their possessions and leaving them destitute. Aunt Lupy was born a Rain-Pipe until she married into the Harpsichord family. Their fate is unknown but presumably they, too, moved away.
The Harpsichords
Another family of Borrowers who lived in the drawing-room wainscot where a harpsichord used to stand. They mixed with the Overmantels and were likewise prone to putting on airs. Lupy married into the Harpsichord family and had three sons before presumably being left a widow. The Harpsichords had lovely manners but likewise suffered from a lack of food. They too emigrated once the drawing room stopped being used.
The Bell-Pulls
Homily's parents. It is implied that they died of natural causes between Homily's marriage and Arrietty's early childhood, as Arrietty cannot remember them.
The Rainbarrels, the Linen-Presses, the Boot-Racks, the Stove-Pipes, the Hon. John Studdingtons
Former Borrower families who once lived in the house. All moved away after their respective areas of the house ceased to be used. (In the case of the Hon. John Studdingtons, they lived behind a portrait of The Boy's great-uncle.)

=== Big People ===
Kate
A "wild, untidy, self-willed little girl", 10 years of age. Kate learns of the Borrowers in the first book. In later books, a slightly older Kate makes a habit of trying to find out more clues of their existence.
The Boy
A ten-year-old boy sent to recover from an illness at the country home of his great-aunt near Leighton Buzzard. As he was raised in India, he has difficulty reading in English and is often thoughtful and quiet, a trait the servants interpret as "sly" and untrustworthy. He befriends Arrietty and her family.
Mrs May / Aunt May
Kate's elderly aunt who tells Kate the story of the Borrowers. The Boy was her brother, and as a young woman, she heard his tales of the Borrowers and spent a good deal of time seeking the truth of them. In subsequent books, an adult May inherits a cottage reputed to be the home of more Borrowers.
Great-Aunt Sophy
The Boy's elderly great-aunt, is an invalid who never comes downstairs. The servants (and the Borrowers) refer to her as "Her." She spends most of her time in bed drinking wine. Pod sometimes comes to visit her while she is drunk, leading her to believe that the Borrowers are a hallucination.
Mrs Driver
The housekeeper and cook. With Great-Aunt Sophy confined to bed, Mrs Driver is in charge of the whole house. She is grumpy, bossy, gossipy, and resents being required to look after The Boy, whom she dislikes on sight.
Crampfurl
The gardener and Mrs Driver's crony. He, too, dislikes The Boy based solely on Driver's suspicions.
Rosa Pickhatchet
A former housemaid who quit after seeing a Borrower.

== Themes ==
A. N. Wilson considered the work as in part an allegory of post-war Britain – with its picture of a diminished people living in an old, half-empty, decaying “Big House”.

== Adaptations ==
- The Borrowers (1973 TV film)
- The Borrowers and The Return of the Borrowers (1992–1993 TV series)
- The Borrowers (1997 film)
- Arrietty (2010 animated film)
- The Borrowers (2011 TV film)

Awards
Preceded by The Wool-Pack	Carnegie Medal recipient 1952	Succeeded by A Valley Grows Up
