= The Borrowers (1992 TV series) =

1992 British children's television series

- Based on: The Borrowers; The Borrowers Afield by Mary Norton
- Written by: Richard Carpenter
- Directed by: John Henderson
- Starring: Ian Holm; Penelope Wilton; Rebecca Callard
- Music by: Howard Goodall
- Country of origin: United Kingdom
- Original language: English

Production
- Cinematography: Clive Tickner
- Editor: David Yardley
- Running time: 164 min.
- Production company: Working Title Films

Original release
- Network: BBC2
- Release: 8 November 1992

Related
- The Return of the Borrowers

The Borrowers is a British television series first broadcast in 1992 on BBC2. The series is divided into six parts, and is adapted from the 1952 Carnegie Medal-winning first novel and the second novel of author Mary Norton's The Borrowers series: The Borrowers and The Borrowers Afield (1955). The series stars Ian Holm, Penelope Wilton and Rebecca Callard and was directed by John Henderson. The series was named on the BFI's list of "100 Greatest British Television Programmes".

Throughout the series, every episode (except the last one) ended on a cliffhanger. The series was followed by The Return of the Borrowers which aired in 1993, also on BBC2.

Both series follow the Clocks, a family of tiny people who are forced to flee from their home under the floorboards in an old manor into the English countryside.

== Plot ==
The Clock Family are "borrowers," tiny people who live in the houses of regular sized "human beans" (a borrower mispronunciation of human beings). They survive by borrowing all they need from big people and try to keep their existence secret. The main characters are a teenage borrower girl named Arrietty and her parents, Pod and Homily. During a borrowing expedition with her father and contrary to borrower nature, Arrietty befriends a human boy named George who lives in the home and develops a friendship with him.

The tiny family, who live under the kitchen floorboards of an old manor (Chawton House in Hampshire was used for on location filming), are eventually discovered by the other humans who occupy the home and are forced to flee into the English countryside. After finding an old boot to live in, the family befriends a fellow Borrower – a young man who goes by the name "Dreadful Spiller". Spiller helps them find a more permanent home by reuniting them with relations who had formerly run away from the same manor after one of them was seen and eventually relocated in the caretaker's cabin on the manor's grounds.

== Cast ==
- Ian Holm as Pod Clock
- Penelope Wilton as Homily Clock
- Rebecca Callard as Arrietty Clock
- Paul Cross as George
- Daniel Newman as "Dreadful Spiller"
- Siân Phillips as Mrs. Driver
- David Ryall as Crampfurl
- Tony Haygarth as Mildeye
- Stanley Lebor as Uncle Hendreary Harpsichord
- Pamela Cundell as Aunt Lupy Harpsichord
- Victoria Donovan as Eggletina Harpsichord

== Awards ==
BAFTA Awards

- 1993 Best Children's Programme (Fiction) (Nominated)
- 1993 Best Design (Won)

Royal Television Society

- 1992 Best Production Design (Won)
