= Penelope Wilton =

English actress (born 1946)

Dame Penelope Wilton DBE
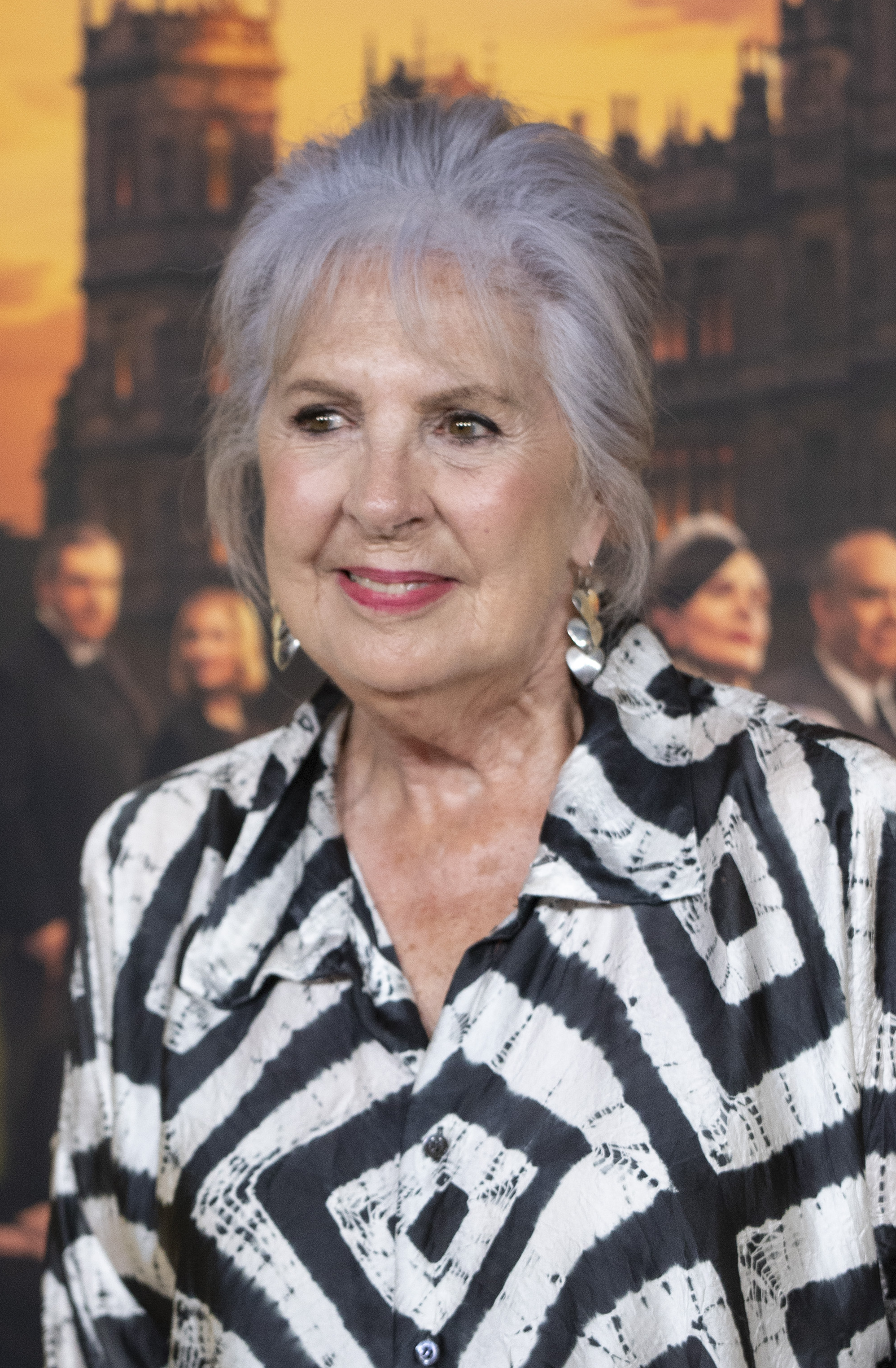
- Wilton in 2025
- Born: Penelope Alice Wilton; 3 June 1946 (age 80); Scarborough, England
- Education: Drama Centre London
- Occupation: Actress
- Years active: 1969–present
- Spouses: Daniel Massey (m. 1975; div. 1984); Sir Ian Holm (m. 1991; div. 2001)
- Children: 1
- Parent(s): Cliff Wilton; Alice Travers
- Relatives: Linden Travers (aunt); Bill Travers (uncle); Susan Travers (cousin); Angela Morant (cousin); Richard Morant (cousin)

Dame Penelope Alice Wilton (born 3 June 1946) is an English actress.

Wilton is known for starring opposite Richard Briers in the BBC sitcom Ever Decreasing Circles (1984–1989), playing Homily in The Borrowers (1992) and The Return of the Borrowers (1993), and her role as the widowed Isobel Crawley in the ITV drama Downton Abbey (2010–2015). She also played the recurring role of Harriet Jones in Doctor Who (2005, 2008) and Anne in Ricky Gervais' Netflix dark comedy After Life.

Wilton has had an extensive career on stage, receiving six Olivier Award nominations. She was nominated for Man and Superman (1981), The Secret Rapture (1988), The Deep Blue Sea (1994), John Gabriel Borkman (2008) and The Chalk Garden (2009), before winning the 2015 Olivier Award for Best Actress for Taken at Midnight. Her film appearances include Clockwise (1986), Cry Freedom (1987), Blame It on the Bellboy (1992), Calendar Girls (2003), Shaun of the Dead (2004), Match Point (2005), Pride & Prejudice (2005), The Best Exotic Marigold Hotel (2012), The Girl (2012), The BFG (2016) and The Unlikely Pilgrimage of Harold Fry (2023).

== Early life and background ==
Wilton was born in Scarborough, North Riding of Yorkshire, the second of three daughters of Cliff Wilton, a Cambridge-educated businessman and barrister who had played rugby union on the amateur and provincial level, going on to be an administrator in the sport, and Alice Linda Travers, a tap dancer and former actress.

She is a niece of actors Bill Travers and Linden Travers. Her cousins include actors Angela and Richard Morant. Her maternal grandparents owned theatres.

She attended the Drama Centre London from 1965 to 1968.

== Career ==
Wilton began her career on stage in 1969 at the Nottingham Playhouse. Her early roles included Cordelia in King Lear, both in Nottingham and at The Old Vic.

She made her Broadway debut in March 1971 when she played Araminta in the original Broadway production of The Philanthropist, and made her West End debut in August 1971 opposite Sir Ralph Richardson in the John Osborne play West of Suez at the Cambridge Theatre. She had previously appeared in both plays at the Royal Court Theatre. She played Ruth in the original 1974 London stage production of Alan Ayckbourn's Norman Conquests trilogy, initially as understudy for Bridget Turner.

Her television acting career began in 1972, playing Vivie Warren in the BBC2's adaptation of Mrs. Warren's Profession opposite Coral Browne in the title role and Robert Powell. The production was repeated as part of the Play of the Month series in 1974 on BBC1. In 1994, Wilton portrayed Browne in a radio adaptation of An Englishman Abroad for the BBC World Service and repeated on various BBC radio formats since.

Following the broadcast of Mrs. Warren's Profession, Wilton then had several major TV roles, including two of the BBC Television Shakespeare productions (as Desdemona in Othello and Regan in King Lear).

Wilton's film career includes roles in The French Lieutenant's Woman (1981), Cry Freedom (1987), Iris (2001), Calendar Girls (2003) and Shaun of the Dead (2004), Jane Austen's Pride & Prejudice (2005), Woody Allen's Match Point (2005), and in The History Boys (2006).

She did not garner fame until she appeared with Richard Briers in the 1984 BBC situation comedy, Ever Decreasing Circles, which ran for five years. She played Ann, long suffering wife of Martin (Briers), an obsessive and pedantic "do-gooder". In 2005, Wilton guest starred as Harriet Jones for two episodes in the BBC's revival of the TV science-fiction series Doctor Who. This guest role was written especially for her by the programme's chief writer and executive producer Russell T. Davies, with whom she had worked on Bob and Rose (ITV, 2001). The character of Jones returned as Prime Minister in the Doctor Who 2005 Christmas special "The Christmas Invasion". In the first part of the 2008 series finale, "The Stolen Earth", she made a final appearance, now as the former Prime Minister who sacrifices herself by extermination by the Daleks so that the Doctor's companions can contact him.

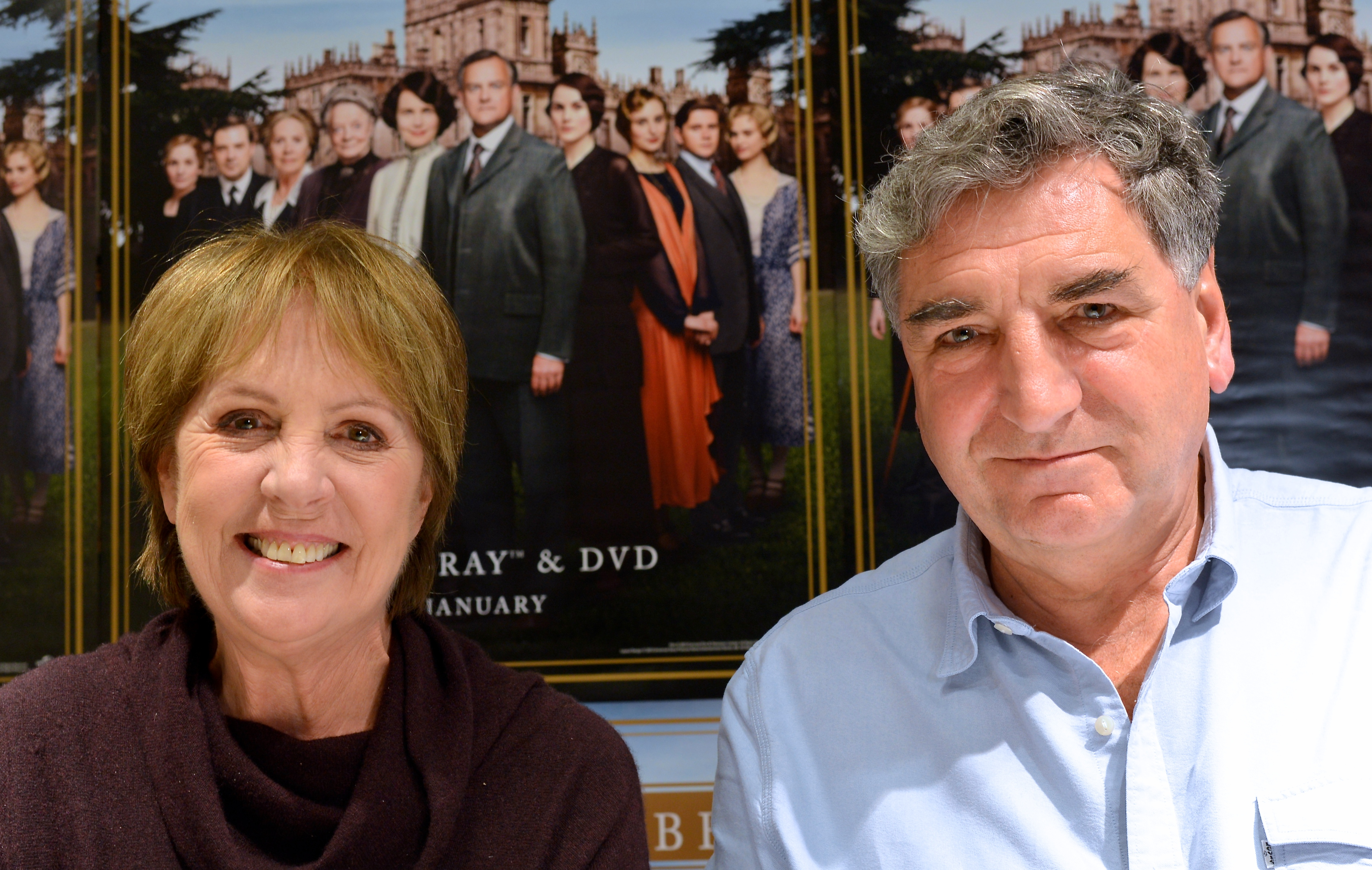
Wilton with Downton Abbey co-star Jim Carter, 2013

Wilton appeared on television as Barbara Poole, the mother of a missing woman, in the BBC television drama series Five Days in 2005; and in ITV's drama Half Broken Things (October 2007) and the BBC production of The Passion (Easter 2008). Beginning in 2010, she appeared as Isobel Crawley in all six seasons of the hit period drama Downton Abbey. She was the castaway on BBC Radio 4's Desert Island Discs in April 2008. In December 2012 and February 2013, she was the narrator in Lin Coghlan's dramatisation of Elizabeth Jane Howard's The Cazalets, broadcast on BBC Radio.

== Personal life ==
Between 1975 and 1984, Wilton was married to actor Daniel Massey. They had a daughter, Alice, born in 1977. Before that, they had a stillborn son.

In 1991, Wilton married actor Ian Holm. In 1992, they appeared together as Pod and Homily in the BBC's adaptation of The Borrowers. A year later, they appeared together in a follow-up The Return of the Borrowers. In 1998, Ian Holm was knighted and Wilton became Lady Holm. They divorced in 2001.

As she has not remarried, she could be known, if she so chose, as Penelope, Lady Holm, in line with the style of the former wife of a knight, similar to the title claimed by Vivien Leigh even after her divorce from the Lord Olivier, Sir Laurence Olivier.

== Honours ==
Wilton was appointed an Officer of the Order of the British Empire (OBE) in the 2004 New Year Honours and was elevated to become a Dame Commander of the Order of the British Empire (DBE) in the 2016 Birthday Honours, both for services to drama. In 2017 Wilton was made an Honorary Graduate and Fellow by York St John University

== Filmography ==
=== Film ===
Year	Title	Role	Notes
1977	Joseph Andrews	Mrs. Wilson	
1981	The French Lieutenant's Woman	Sonia	
1984	Laughterhouse	Alice Singleton	
1986	Clockwise	Pat	
1987	Cry Freedom	Wendy Woods	
1992	Blame It on the Bellboy	Patricia Fulford	
1993	The Secret Rapture	Marion French	
1995	Carrington	Lady Ottoline Morrell	
1999	Gooseberries Don't Dance		Short film
1999	Tom's Midnight Garden	Aunt Melbourne	
2001	Iris	Janet Stone	
2003	Calendar Girls	Ruth	
2004	Shaun of the Dead	Barbara	
2005	Match Point	Eleanor Hewett	
2005	Pride & Prejudice	Mrs. Gardiner	
2006	The History Boys	Mrs. Bibby	
2012	The Best Exotic Marigold Hotel	Jean	
2013	Belle	Lady Mary Murray	
2015	The Second Best Exotic Marigold Hotel	Jean	
2016	The BFG	The Queen	
2017	Zoo	Denise Austin	
2018	The Guernsey Literary and Potato Peel Pie Society	Amelia Maugery	
2019	Downton Abbey	Isobel Grey, Baroness Merton	
2019	Eternal Beauty	Vivian	
2020	Summerland	Older Alice	
2021	Operation Mincemeat	Hester Leggett	
2022	Downton Abbey: A New Era	Isobel Grey, Baroness Merton	
2023	The Unlikely Pilgrimage of Harold Fry	Maureen	
2025	Downton Abbey: The Grand Finale	Isobel Grey, Baroness Merton	
2026	Fing!	Nanny	
TBA	Visitation	TBA	Completed

=== Television ===
Year	Title	Role	Notes
1970–1972	Thirty-Minute Theatre	The Editor's Secretary / Lucy	TV series (2 episodes)
1972	Country Matters	Rachel Sullens	TV series (1 episode: "The Sullens Sisters")
1972	Play of the Month: Mrs. Warren's Profession	Vivie Warren	TV drama (G. B. Shaw)
1973	The Pearcross Girls	Anna Pearcross / Helen Charlesworth / Julia Pearcross / Lottie Merchant	TV series (4 episodes)
1973	The Song of Songs	Lilli Czepanek	TV drama
1975	Play of the Month: King Lear	Regan	Shakespeare, d. Jonathan Miller
1976	The Widowing of Mrs Holroyd	Mrs. Lizzie Holroyd	TV drama
1977	The Norman Conquests: Living Together	Annie	TV drama
1977	The Norman Conquests: Round and Round the Garden	Annie	TV drama
1977	The Norman Conquests: Table Manners	Annie	TV drama
1980–1981	Play for Today	Helen / Virginia Carlion	TV series (2 episodes)
1981	Othello	Desdemona	Shakespeare (d. Jonathan Miller)
1982	The Tale of Beatrix Potter	Beatrix Potter	TV drama
1982	King Lear	Regan	Shakespeare (d. Jonathan Miller)
1984–1989	Ever Decreasing Circles	Ann Bryce	TV series (27 episodes)
1986	C.A.T.S. Eyes	Angela Lane	TV series (1 episode: "Good as New")
1986	The Monocled Mutineer	Lady Angela Forbes	TV series (2 episodes)
1990	4 Play	Julia	TV series (1 episode: "Madly in Love")
1992	Screaming	Beatrice	TV series
1992	The Borrowers	Homily	TV series
1993	The Return of the Borrowers	Homily	TV series
1994–1995	Performance	Hester Collyer / Beth	TV series (2 episodes)
1998	This Could Be the Last Time	Marjorie	Television film
1998	Talking Heads 2	Rosemary	TV miniseries (1 episode: "Nights in the Gardens of Spain")
1998	Alice Through the Looking Glass	White Queen	TV film
1999	Kavanagh QC	Barbara Watkins	TV series (1 episode: "Time of Need")
1999	Wives and Daughters	Mrs. Hamley	TV miniseries (2 episodes)
2000	Rockaby	Old Woman	TV short
2000	Victoria Wood with All the Trimmings	Mrs Cratchitt	A Christmas Carol sketch
2001	The Whistle-Blower	Heather Graham	TV film
2001	Victoria & Albert	Princess Victoria, Duchess of Kent	TV film
2001	Bob & Rose	Monica Gossage	TV series (3 episodes)
2003	Lucky Jim	Celia Welch	TV film
2005	Falling	Daisy Langrish	TV film
2005, 2008	Doctor Who	Harriet Jones	TV series; 4 episodes: Aliens of London, World War Three, The Christmas Invasion and The Stolen Earth
2006	Celebration	Julie	TV film
2007	Five Days	Barbara Poole	TV series (4 episodes); Nominated: RTS Award – Best Actor
2007	Half-Broken Things	Jean	TV film
2008	The Passion	Mary	TV miniseries
2009	Margot	B.Q.	TV film
2010	Marple: They Do It with Mirrors	Carrie Louise Serrocold	TV film
2010	My Family	Rosemary Matthews	TV series (1 episode: "Wheelie Ben")
2010–2015	Downton Abbey	Isobel Crawley, Baroness Merton	TV series
2011	South Riding	Mrs. Beddows	TV series (3 episodes)
2012	The Girl	Peggy Robertson	TV film
2016	Brief Encounters	Pauline Spake	TV series (6 episodes)
2019–2022	After Life	Anne	TV series (3 series)
2023	Murder Is Easy	Miss Pinkerton	Two-part drama
2024	Dead Hot	Francine	TV series (6 episodes)

== Stage ==
Year	Title	Role	Venue
1969	King Lear	Cordelia	Nottingham Playhouse/The Old Vic, London (1970)
1969	The Dandy Lion		Nottingham Playhouse
1969	The Hostage		Nottingham Playhouse
1970	The Philanthropist	Araminta	Royal Court Theatre, London/Ethel Barrymore Theatre, New York City (1971)
1971	West of Suez	Mary	Royal Court Theatre/Cambridge Theatre, London
1972	The Great Exhibition	Maud	Hampstead Theatre Club, London
1973	The Director of the Opera	Sophia	Royal Court Theatre
1973	The Seagull	Masha	Chichester Festival Theatre
1973	Uncle Vanya	Sofia Alexandrovna	Bristol Old Vic - Theatre Royal
1973	Plunder	Joan Hewlett	Bristol Old Vic - Theatre Royal
1974	Something's Burning	Dikson	Mermaid Theatre, London
1974	The Norman Conquests	Ruth	Greenwich Theatre, London
1974	Bloomsbury	Dora Carrington	Phoenix Theatre, London
1975	Measure for Measure	Isabella	Greenwich Theatre
1976	"Play," Play and Others	Second woman	Royal Court Theatre
1978	Plunder	Prudence Malone	National Theatre Company, Lyttelton Theatre, London
1978	The Philanderer	Julia Craven	National Theatre Company, Lyttelton Theatre
1978	Betrayal	Emma	National Theatre Company, Lyttelton Theatre
1979	Tishoo	Barbara	Wyndham's Theatre, London
1981	Man and Superman	Ann Whitefield and Dona Ana	National Theatre Company, Olivier Theatre, London
1981	Much Ado About Nothing	Beatrice	National Theatre Company, Olivier Theatre
1982	Major Barbara	Barbara Undershaft	National Theatre Company, Lyttelton Theatre
1988	The Secret Rapture	Marion French	National Theatre Company, Lyttelton Theatre
1988	Andromache	Hermione	The Old Vic
1990	Piano		National Theatre Company, Cottesloe Theatre, London
1993	The Deep Blue Sea	Hester Collyer	Almeida Theatre, London
1999	A Kind of Alaska, the Collection, and the Lover	Deborah	Donmar Warehouse, London
2000	The Seagull	Arkadina	Barbican Theatre, London
2001	The Little Foxes	Regina	Donmar Warehouse
2002	Afterplay	Sonya	Gielgud Theatre/Gate Theatre, Dublin
2005	The House of Bernarda Alba	Bernarda	National Theatre Company, Lyttelton Theatre
2006	Eh Joe	Female voice	Gate Theatre, Dublin/Duke of York's Theatre, London
2006	Women Beware Women	Livia	Swan Theatre, Stratford
2007	John Gabriel Borkman	Ella Rentheim	Donmar Warehouse
2008	The Chalk Garden	Miss Madrigal	Donmar Warehouse
2008	The Family Reunion	Agatha	Donmar Warehouse
2009	Hamlet	Gertrude	Wyndham's Theatre
2011	A Delicate Balance	Agnes	Almeida Theatre
2014–2015	Taken at Midnight	Irmgard Litten	Minerva Theatre, Chichester/Theatre Royal Haymarket, London
2018	Fanny and Alexander	Helena Ekdahl	The Old Vic
2019	The Bay at Nice	Valentina Nrovka	Menier Chocolate Factory, London
2023	Backstairs Billy	Queen Mother	Duke of York's Theatre

== Awards and recognition ==
In 2012, Wilton received an honorary doctorate from the University of Hull Scarborough Campus.

=== Theatre ===
Year	Award	Nominated work	Result
1981	Olivier Award for Actress of the Year in a Revival	Man and Superman	Nominated
1981	Critics' Circle Award for Best Actress	Much Ado About Nothing	Won
1988	Olivier Award for Actress of the Year in a New Play	The Secret Rapture	Nominated
1993	Critics' Circle Award for Best Actress	The Deep Blue Sea	Won
1994	Olivier Award for Best Actress	The Deep Blue Sea	Nominated
2001	Evening Standard Award for Best Actress	The Little Foxes	Nominated
2008	Olivier Award for Best Actress	John Gabriel Borkman	Nominated
2008	Evening Standard Award for Best Actress	The Chalk Garden	Won
2009	Olivier Award for Best Actress	The Chalk Garden	Nominated
2015	Olivier Award for Best Actress	Taken at Midnight	Won

=== Film and television ===
Year	Award	Nominated work	Result
2012	Critics' Choice Movie Award for Best Acting Ensemble	The Best Exotic Marigold Hotel	Nominated
2012	Screen Actors Guild Award for Outstanding Performance by a Cast in a Motion Picture	The Best Exotic Marigold Hotel	Nominated
2012	Screen Actors Guild Award for Outstanding Performance by an Ensemble in a Drama Series	Downton Abbey	Won
2013	Screen Actors Guild Award for Outstanding Performance by an Ensemble in a Drama Series	Downton Abbey	Nominated
2014	Screen Actors Guild Award for Outstanding Performance by an Ensemble in a Drama Series	Downton Abbey	Won
2015	Screen Actors Guild Award for Outstanding Performance by an Ensemble in a Drama Series	Downton Abbey	Won
