= Bedknobs and Broomsticks (musical) =

Musical based on the 1971 film

- Official poster
- Music: Robert B. Sherman; Richard M. Sherman; Neil Bartram
- Lyrics: Robert B. Sherman; Richard M. Sherman; Neil Bartram
- Book: Brian Hill
- Basis: Stories by Mary Norton and 1971 Walt Disney film
- Premiere: August 14, 2021: Theatre Royal, Newcastle upon Tyne
- Productions: 2021 UK and Ireland tour

Bedknobs and Broomsticks is a stage musical based on the stories by Mary Norton and the 1971 Walt Disney film starring Angela Lansbury and David Tomlinson. It features the original songs by the Sherman Brothers, new songs and additional music and lyrics by Neil Bartram and book by Brian Hill.

== Background ==
The musical was originally due to premiere at The Yard at Chicago Shakespeare Theater from May 30 to July 28, 2019 as part of its 2018/19 season, directed and choreographed by Rachel Rockwell, but due to Rockwell's death on May 26, 2018, the musical was postponed and replaced with a production of Six.

The stage adaptation was originally developed with director Jack Cummings III from 2012-2015, including an initial workshop at The University of Michigan followed by multiple readings and workshops at Chicago Shakespeare Theatre.

In May 2020, while speaking about the closure of Frozen on Broadway to The New York Times, Thomas Schumacher, the president of Disney Theatrical Productions, confirmed the musical was in development with new directors Candice Edmunds and Jamie Harrison.

== Production history ==
=== 2021-22 UK and Ireland tour ===
The musical had its world premiere at the Theatre Royal in Newcastle upon Tyne on August 14, 2021 before embarking on a UK and Ireland tour until May 2022. The production is directed by Candice Edmunds and Jamie Harrison, with set design and illusions also by Jamie Harrison. Costume design is by Gabriella Slade, orchestrations are by Simon Hale, musical supervision is by Tom Murray, choreography and movement direction are by Neil Bettles, sound design is by Gareth Fry, lighting is by Simon Wilkinson, production management is by Gary Beestone, and casting by Jill Green and Jo Hawes.

The production is produced by Michael Harrison by special arrangement with Disney Theatrical Productions. Casting for the production included Dianne Pilkington as Eglantine Price, Charles Brunton as Emelius Browne, Conor O'Hara as Charlie Rawlins, Jacqui DuBois as Jessica Hobday, Mark Anderson as Sherman, Matthew Elliot-Campell as King Leonidas, Rob Madge as Norton, Emma Thornett as Angela and Susannah van den Berg as Mrs. Mason.

== Cast and characters ==
Character	UK and Ireland tour
Character	2021-22
Eglantine Price	Dianne Pilkington
Emelius Browne	Charles Brunton
Charlie Rawlins	Conor O'Hara
Carrie Rawlins	Izabella Bucknell
Carrie Rawlins	Sapphire Hagon
Carrie Rawlins	Poppy Houghton
Carrie Rawlins	Evie Lightman
Paul Rawlins	Dexter Barry
Paul Rawlins	Haydn Court
Paul Rawlins	Jasper Hawes
Paul Rawlins	Aidan Oti
Jessica Hobday	Jacqui DuBois
Sherman	Mark Anderson
King Leonidas	Matthew Elliot-Campbell
Norton	Rob Madge
Angela	Emma Thornett
Mrs. Mason	Susannah van den Berg

== Instrumentation ==
The orchestration for a stage musical adaptation of the Disney classic was scored on 1 flute, 1 piccolo, 1 oboe, 1 cor anglais, 2 clarinets, 1 bass clarinet, 1 bassoon, 1 alto saxophone, 1 tenor saxophone, 1 baritone saxophone, 2 trumpets, 2 french horns, 1 trombone, 1 bass trombone, 1 tuba, 1 piano, 1 keyboard, 1 accordion, 1 drum kit, 1 timpani, 1 snare drum, 1 bass drum, 1 cymbal, 1 triangle, 1 glockenspiel, 2 violins, 1 viola, 1 cello, 1 double bass and 1 bass guitar.

== Setting ==
- Place: London, England, Dorset County & Island of Nopeepo
- Time: August 1940

== Musical numbers ==
Act I

- "Prologue"
- "Nobody's Problems" - Charlie, Carrie, Paul
- "Miss Price, I Believe" - Carrie, Paul, Charlie
- "A Step in the Right Direction" - Eglantine, Ensemble
- "Negotiality" - Charlie
- "Filigree, Apogee, Pedigree, Perigee" - Eglantine, Ensemble
- "Bedknob Spell" - Eglantine, Carrie, Paul, Ensemble
- "The Age of Not Believing" - Eglantine
- "Bedknob Spell (Reprise 1)" - Eglantine, Carrie, Paul, Ensemble
- "Emelius The Great" - Emelius, Ensemble
- "Filigree, Apogee, Pedigree, Perigee (Reprise)" - Eglantine, Ensemble
- "Bedknob Spell (Reprise 2)" - Eglantine, Carrie, Paul, Ensemble
- "Eglantine" - Emelius, Charlie, Eglatine, Carrie, Paul
- "Bedknob Spell (Reprise 3)" - Eglantine, Carrie, Paul, Ensemble
- "Portobello Road" - Cast
- "Negotiality (Reprise 1)" - Charlie
- "Bedknob Spell (Reprise 4)" - Eglantine, Carrie, Paul, Ensemble

Act II

- "Entr'acte"
- "Nopeepo Lagoon" - Norton, Ensemble
- "The Beautiful Briny" - Eglatine, Emelius, Charlie, Carrie, Paul, Ensemble
- "Fish, Fish" - Sherman
- "Negotiality (Reprise 2)" - Charlie
- "Emelius and Eglantine" - Eglantine, Emelius, Charlie, Carrie, Paul
- "Substitutiary Locomotion" - Eglantine, Emelius, Charlie, Carrie, Paul, Ensemble
- "Nobody's Problems (Reprise)" - Eglantine, Emelius, Charlie, Carrie, Paul
- "It's Now" - Emelius
- "The Age of Not Believing (Reprise)" - Charlie
- "Onward" - Eglantine, Carrie, Charlie, Paul, Emelius, Ensemble
- "Epilogue" - Cast
