= The Story of My Life (musical) =

Canadian/American 2006 musical

- Playbill cover of 2009 Broadway production
- Music: Neil Bartram
- Lyrics: Neil Bartram
- Book: Brian Hill
- Productions: 2006 Toronto; 2008 Goodspeed Musicals; 2009 Broadway

The Story of My Life is a musical with music and lyrics by Neil Bartram, and a book by Brian Hill. The show follows two childhood friends from age six to 35 and has only two characters.

The musical debuted at Canadian Stage Company in Toronto in 2006 starring Brent Carver and Jeffrey Kuhn and premiered on Broadway in February 2009, closing after nineteen previews and five regular performances.

== Synopsis ==
Best-selling author Thomas Weaver has come back to his hometown to deliver the eulogy for his childhood friend, Alvin Kelby, but finds himself desperately scrambling for something to say. (Write What You Know). His reality is shattered by the memory of Alvin who takes him deep into Thomas's mind cluttered with a lifetime of stories. Alvin suggests that they excavate the story of their first meeting (Mrs. Remington). Thomas rejects Alvin's help but Alvin persists, offering the story of the last time they saw each other, one week ago, when Thomas was tasked with delivering the eulogy for Alvin’s father. Thomas immediately ends this story. Alvin chooses another recalling an evening spent searching his dad's bookstore for a gift for Thomas (The Greatest Gift). Thomas recognizes that the gift, a copy of Tom Sawyer, planted the seed for his desire to become a writer (1876).

Alvin continues selecting stories including a recollection of the time they promised to deliver each other’s eulogy, a promise that locked Thomas into his current dilemma. Alvin chooses a story of Thomas belittling Alvin’s fascination with a flapping butterfly (Normal). Thomas responds by selecting a story telling of the consequences of this behavior. Alvin’s response (People Carry On) gives Thomas a new understanding of his friend. Alvin reintroduces the story of their last time together. Even though Thomas had been asked to write Alvin's father's eulogy, he only offered “a quote from a dead poet.” Again, Thomas shuts this story down.

Alvin persists, choosing stories that track the passing years as life infringed on their friendship. There’s the one of Thomas asking for Alvin’s life-altering critique of a story written for his college application (The Butterfly). There’s the one about their awkward goodbye as Thomas left for school (Saying Goodbye Pt. 1). There’s the one about Thomas coming back with a seemingly insurmountable writing assignment (Here's Where It Begins). There’s the one about Alvin's first meeting with Thomas's fiancée (Saying Goodbye Pt, 2). With each story, small connections between them become apparent revealing the effect that Alvin had on Thomas's life.

Alvin selects a story about Thomas inviting Alvin to leave his hometown for the first time, an invitation that irreparably altered their friendship (Independence Day). Thomas tries to excuse his behavior (I Like It Here), but Alvin criticizes the questionable choices made by Thomas throughout their friendship (You're Amazing Tom). Thomas attempts to explain the struggles of creativity using a failed "work in progress" as an example but Alvin's rebuttal pushes him to the edge of a nervous breakdown (Nothing There) desperately searching for anything to put this eulogy behind him.

Alvin reintroduces the story of their last meeting and Thomas lets it play out. Thomas's failed attempt to write Alvin's father's eulogy leads to a final rift in the friendship and Alvin chooses to deliver his father's eulogy off the cuff. Thomas watches as Alvin's eloquent words let him see his friend as he's never seen him before (I Didn't See Alvin).

Thomas begs Alvin to reveal the story of his death but Alvin tells him that this is one story that Thomas will never know (This Is It). Thomas revisits his work in progress (Angels In the Snow) and is finally able to finish. Alvin's presence fades. Thomas steps up to the podium and begins telling the story of his friend’s life.

== Productions ==
Following developmental readings at Manhattan Theatre Club, The Eugene O'Neill Theater Center, and Canadian Stage Company, The Story of My Life was produced in Toronto at the Canadian Stage Company in 2006. It was next produced at the National Alliance for Musical Theatre's Festival of New Musicals in the fall of 2007.

The musical then ran at Goodspeed Musicals, East Haddam, Connecticut from October 10, 2008, through November 2. The production was directed by Richard Maltby, Jr., and featured Will Chase as Thomas Weaver and Malcolm Gets as Alvin Kelby.

The show premiered on Broadway at the Booth Theatre on February 3, 2009, and opened officially on February 19, 2009. Maltby directed with Chase and Gets reprising their roles. The musical closed on February 22, 2009, after five performances and 18 previews. It received four 2009 Drama Desk Award nominations: Outstanding Music (Neil Bartram), Outstanding Lyrics (Neil Bartram), Outstanding Book (Brian Hill), and Outstanding Musical.

The Story of My Life received its first regional production in April 2010, at Act 2 Playhouse in Ambler, Pennsylvania. It was directed by Act 2's Producing Artistic Director Bud Martin (an original producer of the Broadway production) and starred Barrymore Award Winner Tony Braithwaite as Alvin Kelby and Jim Stanek as Thomas.

It opened at the Dongsoong Art Center in central Seoul, Korea, on July 13, 2010, produced by the OD Musical Company. That production returned on October 28, 2011.

The Northern California premiere opened at Contra Costa Civic Theatre in El Cerrito, CA on November 4, 2010. It starred William Giammona as Thomas Weaver and Paul Araquistain as Alvin Kelby. The production was directed by Dennis M. Lickteig and Music Directed and conducted by Joe Simiele.

The Story of My Life opened at Victory Gardens Theatre in Chicago, IL on November 9, 2010. The production is produced by Chicago Muse and stars Jack Noseworthy and Davis Duffield.

The Story of My Life film based on the 2010 Seoul Korea based OD Musical Company production released in 2011.

The San Francisco premiere of The Story of My Life opened at the New Conservatory Theater on January 28, 2012, following six previews. It closed on February 26, 2012. The production starred Coley Grundman as Alvin Kelby and William Giammona as Thomas Weaver. The production was directed by Dennis Lickteig and music directed by Joe Simiele with Stage Management by Blake Kennedy. Kuo-Hao Ho provided set design, Christian Mejia designed lights and Jessie Amoroso created the costumes.

The Atlanta premiere opened at Centerstage North on May 11, 2012, starring Kelly David Carr as Alvin Kelby and John Stanier as Thomas Weaver. The production was directed by Julie Taliaferro with music direction by Bill Newberry, set design by Jasmine Vouge Pai, lighting design by John F. Parker Jr., and accompaniment by Barbara Capogna Macko.

"The Story of My Life" premiered in Denmark at the Fredericia Theater and ran from November 19 to December 14, 2014, and starred Søren Scheibye and Lars Molsted. The production was directed by Susan H. Schulman.

In December 2014, The Story of My Life was played in Fakkelteater in Antwerp, Belgium. The production stars David Imbrechts and Michaël Lejeune and is directed by Anneke Vercruysse. This production returned in December 2015 to the same location.

Also in December 2014, The Story of My Life had its German-speaking premiere (entitled "Die Geschichte meines Lebens") in Vienna's Theater Center Forum, starring Andreas Bieber and Daniel Große Boymann who also created the German version.

In April/May 2018 "The Story of My Life" was played at Himmerlands Teater in Hobro, Denmark, and starred Sune Kofoed as Alvin and Ronny Sterlø as Tom. The production was directed by Susanne Sangill.

In 2022, The Story of My Life ("La Storia della mia vita", adapted into Italian by Sara Moschin) is to debut in Italy. The production stars Fabrizio Voghera as Thomas Weaver and Francesco Nardo as Alvin Kelby and is directed by Ilaria Deangelis.

"The Story of My Life" played November 30, 2023 through February 18th, 2024 at Doosan Arts Center, produced by OD Company.

"The Story of My Life" debuted Off-West End at the Stage Door Theatre, in a limited run from September 10 to October 19, 2024. The production stars Markus Sodergren as Thomas Weaver and Tim Edwards as Alvin Kelby .

In Germany, The Story of my life debuted at the Musiktheater in Revier in Gelsenkirchen in 2024, featuring Sebastian Schiller as Thomas Weiver and Benjamin Lee as Alvin Kelby, directed to a five star review by South African director Vongani Bevula.

== Song list ==
The original Broadway Cast Album was produced by PS Classics.

- Write What You Know - Thomas Weaver
- Mrs. Remington - Alvin Kelby
- The Greatest Gift - Alvin Kelby and Thomas Weaver
- 1876 - Thomas Weaver
- Normal - Thomas Weaver
- People Carry On - Alvin Kelby
- The Butterfly - Thomas Weaver
- Saying Goodbye (Part 1) - Thomas Weaver and Alvin Kelby
- Here's Where It Begins - Thomas Weaver and Alvin Kelby
- Saying Goodbye (Part 2) - Thomas Weaver and Alvin Kelby
- Independence Day - Alvin Kelby
- Saying Goodbye (Part 3) - Thomas Weaver and Alvin Kelby
- I Like It Here - Thomas Weaver
- You're Amazing, Tom - Alvin Kelby
- Nothing There/Saying Goodbye (Part 4) - Thomas Weaver and Alvin Kelby
- I Didn't See Alvin - Thomas Weaver
- This Is It - Alvin Kelby and Thomas Weaver
- Angels in the Snow - Alvin Kelby and Thomas Weaver

== Response ==
Michael Kuchwara, in his Associated Press review, wrote "The Story of My Life is a heartfelt little musical that has the courage of its sweet-tempered, low-key convictions. These days, that's a novelty. In a Broadway world of big musicals determined to sell themselves, this gentle new show celebrates softly but with an emotional pull that slowly wins you over."

David Finkle wrote in TheaterMania.com: "...composer-lyricist Neil Bartram and librettist Brian Hill have come up with something good, but had they also supplied the story crouching behind the story, they could have produced an ultimately more satisfying piece of theater."

NY1's Roma Torre said "Partners Neil Bartram, who wrote the music and lyrics, and Brian Hill, who wrote the obviously Sondheim-inspired book, fine-tuned this work with a keen insight for those seemingly inconsequential moments in relationships that turn out to be magically momentous. Bartram's lovely songs resonate on many levels, while Richard Maltby Jr. adds further dimension with his sharply-etched direction. Will Chase as Thomas and Malcolm Gets as Alvin are exceptionally talented. So perfectly matched in ways both subtle and large, they deliver splendidly calibrated performances that are simply flawless....This is an impressive collaborative effort that, despite its minimalism, has the power to pack quite an emotional punch."

Paul Vale, writing for The Stage magazine, said about the London premiere "From this low-concept story, Bartram and Hill create a thing of beauty, drawing heavily on the butterfly effect and how a person may not realise the influence that they have on others. It’s no surprise perhaps that Thomas and Alvin’s favourite movie is It’s a Wonderful Life, but Hill’s poignant narrative jumps back and forth, as Thomas tries to unravel how things fell apart. Bartram, who is probably best known for scoring the stage version of Bedknobs and Broomsticks, has created an urgent, romantic score that captures every nuance of the story, complemented by intelligent and insightful lyrics."
