= Bonfires and Broomsticks =

1947 children's book by Mary Norton

- First edition (UK)
- Author: Mary Norton
- Illustrator: Waldo Pierce
- Cover artist: Mary Adshead
- Language: English
- Publisher: J. M. Dent
- Publication date: 10 May 1947
- Publication place: United Kingdom
- Media type: Print (hardback and paperback)
- Pages: 192
- ISBN: 978-0460881760
- Preceded by: The Magic Bedknob; or, How to Become a Witch in Ten Easy Lessons

Bonfires and Broomsticks is a 1947 children's book by Mary Norton. Parts of the book were adapted into the 1971 Disney film Bedknobs and Broomsticks.

== Synopsis ==
Two years after the events of The Magic Bedknob, Carey, Charles and Paul convince their mother to let them stay with Miss Price again. Using the bedknob, they travel back in time to the reign of Charles II, where they meet a friendly necromancer called Emilius and bring him back with them.

== Omnibus ==
The book and its 1944 predecessor were combined into the omnibus Bedknob and Broomstick in 1957, illustrated by Erik Blegvad.
