= Blegvad =

Blegvad is a surname. Notable people with the surname include:

- Erik Blegvad (1923–2014), Danish British children's book illustrator
- Peter Blegvad (born 1951), American musician, singer-songwriter, writer, and cartoonist
