= Susan H. Schulman =

American theatre director (born 1947)

- Born: July 6, 1947 (age 79)
- Education: Hofstra University; Yale University
- Occupation: Theatre director

Susan H. Schulman (born July 6, 1947) is an American theatre director.

== Biography ==
Intent on a career as an actress, Schulman studied drama at Hofstra University in Hempstead, Long Island, New York in the 1960s. She attended Yale University on a playwrighting fellowship, graduating with a Master's Degree. While performing at the Buffalo Studio Arena Theatre, she was presented with her first opportunity to mount a production when the director of an adaptation of The Wind in the Willows abruptly left the project.

She was the resident director for the Pittsburgh Civic Light Opera from 1981 to 1989. She became involved with several productions at the off-off-Broadway Equity Library Theatre in New York City, including directing A Little Night Music in 1985.

She directed the York Theatre Company production of Stephen Sondheim's Sweeney Todd in 1989, which Sondheim happened to see. Impressed by her work, he recommended her for the upcoming Broadway revival. She directed the 1989 Broadway revival, earning a Tony Award nomination as Best Director of a Musical. She then directed the 1991 musical version of The Secret Garden on Broadway, which garnered her a Drama Desk Award nomination for Outstanding Director of a Musical.

In 1994, she returned to the York Theatre Company to direct a revised version of Sondheim's Merrily We Roll Along, which won her an Obie Award.

For the New York City Center Encores! staged concerts, she directed Allegro in 1994,The Boys From Syracuse in 1997 and A Connecticut Yankee in 2001.

At Playwrights Horizons she directed Jack's Holiday in 1995 and Violet in 1997. She was nominated for the 1997 Drama Desk Award for Outstanding Director of a Musical for Violet.

In 1998, Schulman had directed a Broadway revival of The Sound of Music when she was contacted by Andrew Lloyd Webber, who asked her to adapt a scaled-down production of Sunset Boulevard for a US tour starring Petula Clark. (A first attempt had been aborted due to exorbitant costs involved in transporting and time spent erecting the massive set.) The critically acclaimed run started in November 1998 in Pittsburgh and lasted seventeen months.

In 2005, Schulman returned to Broadway to direct a musical adaptation of the Louisa May Alcott story Little Women, starring Sutton Foster as Jo and pop singer Maureen McGovern as Marmee. Although the production drew many mothers and daughters, mostly lackluster reviews prevented it from becoming a hit, and it closed after a five-month run. Following the Broadway closing, the production toured the US for a year.

Schulman directed a musical adaptation of Peter Pan, set in contemporary times, with Kurt Browning in the title role, at the Elgin Theatre in Toronto, beginning in November 2007.

Schulman's work for the Stratford Festival of Canada includes Fiddler on the Roof, Man of La Mancha, The King and I (2003), The Music Man (2008), Hello, Dolly!, and a stage adaptation of To Kill a Mockingbird (2007). In summer 2008, under the auspices of the Festival, she conducted a two-week workshop of Clara's Piano, a blend of classical music and dance with music and lyrics by Neil Bartram and book by Brian Hill, based on Schulman's original concept.

She directed the musical I Do! I Do! at the Westport Country Playhouse, starring Kate Baldwin and Lewis Cleale in August 2010.

Schulman had been set to direct the new musical Stardust Road, based on the songs of Hoagy Carmichael at the St. James Theatre in London beginning in October 2015. However, that production has been postponed.

=== Teaching ===
Ms. Schulman is currently a professor at Penn State University where she heads the graduate directing program. She directed a production of "The Prime of Miss Jean Brodie" in the Fall of 2009 at Penn State's University Park campus. In the fall of 2012 she directed the university's production of 'Sweeney Toddy', drawing on her reinvention of the 1989 Broadway revival.
