= 1972 Academy Awards =

1972 Academy Awards may refer to:

- 44th Academy Awards, the Academy Awards ceremony that took place in 1972
- 45th Academy Awards, the 1973 ceremony honoring the best in film for 1972
