= Disney Theatrical Productions =

Subsidiary of The Walt Disney Company

Disney Theatrical Productions Ltd.
- Type: Division
- Industry: Theater
- Founded: February 8, 1993; 33 years ago (as Walt Disney Theatrical Production, Ltd.)
- Founder: Ron Logan
- Headquarters: New York City, New York, United States
- Key people: Anne Quart (Executive Producer); Andrew Flatt (Managing Director)
- Products: Productions
- Parent: Disney Theatrical Group
- Website: disneyonbroadway.com

Disney Theatrical Productions Limited (DTP), also known as Disney on Broadway, is the stageplay and musical production company of the Disney Theatrical Group, a subsidiary of Disney Entertainment, a major division and business unit of The Walt Disney Company.

Founded in 1993 by longtime Disney Entertainment veteran Ron Logan as Walt Disney Theatrical, the division has had extensive critical and commercial success and is today considered a staple of Broadway theatre. The company has staged a range of productions, most notably various theatrical adaptations of animated musical films from the Disney Renaissance, starting with Beauty and the Beast on April 18, 1994. Its 1994 investment in taking over the New Amsterdam Theatre spurred a revitalization of Broadway. The Lion King (1997) would become the highest-grossing Broadway show of all time. The company is a division of Disney Theatrical Group, led by Anne Quart, Executive Producer and Andrew Flatt, managing director.

== History ==
Walt Disney Theatrical Production, Ltd. (DTP) was formed on February 8, 1993, with Ron Logan, Disney Park's live production head, as president to produce Beauty and the Beast. Beauty and the Beast opened on Broadway at the Palace Theatre on April 18, 1994. Disney Theatrical signed a 49-year revenue based lease for New Amsterdam Theatre in May 1995. The building was renovated by Disney Development Company. With The Lion King under consideration for the next Broadway adaption, Eisner ceded DTP to theatre-rooted Disney Animation president Peter Schneider and Thomas Schumacher, at their request, making them president and executive vice president of DTP respectively. In 1997, DTP re-opened the New Amsterdam Theatre with King David followed by The Lion King musical.

Peter Schneider was promoted to Disney Studios president in January 1999, while Thomas Schumacher was promoted to president of Walt Disney Feature Animation and Walt Disney Theatrical Productions, while both are made co-presidents of Disney Theatrical. On November 23, 1999, the corporate name was changed to Buena Vista Theatrical Group Limited, with Disney Theatrical Productions becoming a division of the group with the formation of Hyperion Theatricals in January 2000.

Schneider left Disney Theatrical in June 2001 to form his own theater production company partly funded by Disney. His first project was developing and directing the stage version of Sister Act with Michael Reno. The musical had its official world premiere on November 3, 2006, at the Pasadena Playhouse, with DTP as an associated presenter during its Broadway run.

In 2013, Disney Theatrical revealed that a show based on The Muppets was in exploratory development and that a 15-minute show had been conducted by Thomas Schumacher to evaluate the technical components. Disney Studios chairman Alan Horn in November 2013 created a deal for Disney Theatrical Productions to develop a The Princess Bride stage adaptation, possibly either a musical or play.

Freaky Friday musical was developed by Disney Theatrical Productions from the book and Disney films for theatres to license. The musical premiered in October 2016 at Signature Theatre in Arlington, Virginia followed by three other theatre productions. Coinciding with the August 10, 2018 release of the Disney Theatrical Productions Disney Channel Original Movie adaptation, a one-act version of the stage musical (based on the adaptation) was made available for licensing.

Disney Theatrical Productions' Newsies debuted in Australian and New Zealand cinemas on February 19, 2017.

On September 28, 2023, Schumacher announced to the staff of Disney Theatrical Productions that he was taking a new role within the subsidiary as Chief Creative Officer. The day-to-day management over producing and development has shifted to former Senior Vice President, Anne Quart, who now holds the title of Executive Vice President and Executive Producer. The business operations of the subsidiary now rests with Andrew Flatt, who was also formerly a Senior Vice President. Flatt's new title is Executive Vice President and managing director.

In September 2025, Schumacher departed Disney Theatrical Productions after more than three decades with the company. Following his exit, Quart and Flatt were formally appointed to lead the organization as Executive Producer and managing director, respectively, marking a new leadership era for the division.

== Animation adaptations ==
=== Beauty and the Beast ===
The show began previews in New York City on March 9, 1994, and officially opened at the Palace Theatre on April 18, 1994. The musical was the first Broadway adaptation by Disney, based on the 1991 animated film by Linda Woolverton and with music and lyrics by Alan Menken, Howard Ashman and Tim Rice. Several new songs were written for the Broadway musical, including Home, a ballad sung by Belle which quickly became the signature song of the musical. It ran until July 29, 2007, at the Lunt-Fontanne Theatre, to make room for another Disney production, The Little Mermaid. At 5,461 performances, the show is currently the eleventh-longest run in Broadway history.

It has been performed internationally first at the Princess Theatre in Melbourne, Australia and has also been performed in London, Vienna, Toronto, Kyoto, Seoul, Stuttgart, Sydney, Mexico City, Guayaquil, Johannesburg, Madrid, Moscow, Milan, São Paulo and has also toured around the United States and the United Kingdom. In the Netherlands this production was co-produced by Joop van den Ende's Stage Entertainment with new sets and costumes. On April 24, 2019, Disney Theatrical Groups revealed that Beauty and the Beast would return to Broadway. Thomas Schumacher announced that the Broadway revival would be updated. Theatre and dates have not been announced. The musical was revived in London's West End at the London Palladium for a limited engagement lasting from June through September 2022.

=== The Lion King ===
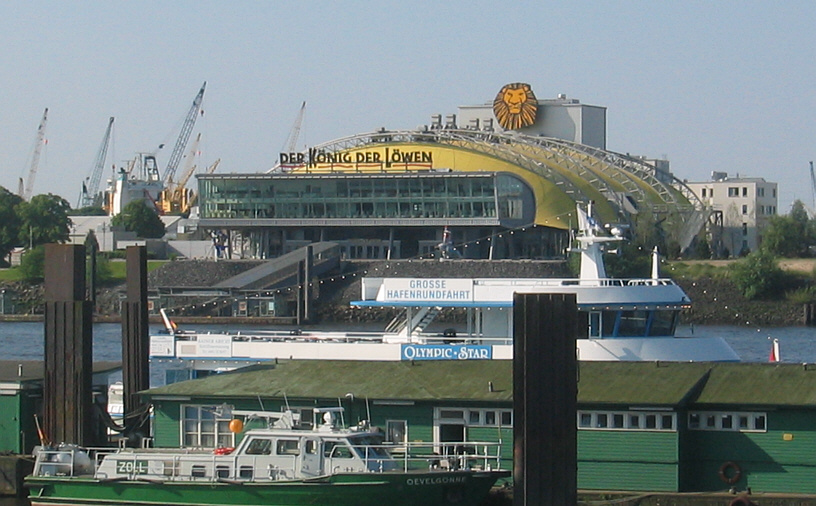
The Lion King followed Buddy: The Buddy Holly Story at the "Theater im Hafen", Hamburg. The theatre was completely renovated, by Stage Entertainment, before The Lion King transferred to Germany.

The show, based on the 1994 animated film, debuted July 8, 1997, in Minneapolis, Minnesota at the Orpheum Theatre, before premiering on Broadway at the New Amsterdam Theater on October 15, 1997, in previews with the official opening on November 13, 1997. On June 13, 2006, the Broadway production moved to the Minskoff Theatre to make way for the musical version of Mary Poppins, which later was replaced by Aladdin. It is now Broadway's third longest-running show. The show uses a range of theatrical techniques, and is not a conventional musical. It has consistently been one of the highest grossing musicals on Broadway every week. Besides running in various venues around the world, it also runs eight times per week on Broadway. The production won the Tony Award for Best Musical at the 1998 Tony Awards.

=== The Hunchback of Notre Dame ===
The musical opened on June 5, 1999, for the opening of the Musical theater Berlin (now Theater am Potsdamer Platz). After a successful run, it closed in June 2002. Directed by James Lapine, the German translation was by Michael Kunze, choreography by Lar Lubovitch, set design by Heidi Ettinger, costume design by Sue Blane, lighting by Rick Fisher, sound by Tony Meola and projections by Jerome Sirlin.

This was Disney's first musical to premiere outside the US, and it became one of Berlin's longest-running musicals to date. As with Beauty and the Beast and The Lion King, The Hunchback of Notre Dame opened three years after the release of the movie it is based on.

The musical is a darker, more gothic adaptation of the film and is more heavily based on Victor Hugo's 1831 novel. According to translator Michael Kunze, he was "campaigning to allow Esmeralda to die at the end, as she does in the book. There was a feeling that the audience would be depressed if Esmeralda dies. I feel that a European audience would see this as a very romantic ending ... two lost souls finally find each other. People will cry, but they'll be moved. And it is a very romantic ending." The producers wanted to see how "preview audiences react before making the final decision."

In 2008, Stephen Schwartz said, "I think we're starting up The Hunchback of Notre Dame, hopefully, next year (2009). Rumor has reached my ear that it's happening." Thomas Schumacher, head of Disney Theatrical, discussed current and future stage productions in an article published by the Columbus Dispatch on September 21, 2008, including an English-language production of Hunchback. The musical had its US premiere at La Jolla Playhouse from October 28 through December 7, 2014. The production was directed by Scott Schwartz and the creative team includes Chase Brock as the choreographer, Michael Kosarin as the music supervisor and arranger, Michael Starobin as the orchestrator, Alexander Dodge as the scenic designer, Alejo Vietti as the costume design Howell Binkley as the lighting designer, and Gareth Owen as the sound design. The Hunchback of Notre Dame had a workshop in February 2014. The La Jolla Playhouse production transferred to the Paper Mill Playhouse from March 4 through April 5, 2015. In 2017, the German version, with the same set decor, is playing in Berlin and München, Germany. In 2018, the production transferred to Stuttgart.

=== Tarzan ===
The show was based on the 1999 animated film and the novel Tarzan of the Apes by Edgar Rice Burroughs, and debuted on Broadway on May 10, 2006, at the Richard Rodgers Theatre. The show was heavily publicized with Phil Collins and the lead actors promoting the new musical on several media shows including The Today Show, Good Morning America, and Live with Regis and Kelly. After playing at the Richard Rodgers Theatre for over a year the show closed on July 8, 2007.

On April 15, 2007, the musical debuted in Europe in the Netherlands as the successor of The Lion King in Scheveningen. A Broadway musical had never previously arrived in the Netherlands so soon after its Broadway premiere. Phil Collins was a special guest at the 2006 Johnny Kraaijkamp Musical Award s, where he announced the news that Tarzan was coming to the Netherlands. Due to the size of the Circustheater, the show was expanded beyond the original Broadway production.

In 2008, a new production opened in Germany. A casting show on TV called "Ich Tarzan, Du Jane" ("I Tarzan, you Jane") searched for actors for the roles of Tarzan and Jane.

A revamped tour version had previously been announced to debut in January 2009 in Atlanta at the Theatre of the Stars. The new production was supposed to feature the same music and book, and directed and choreographed by Lynne Taylor-Corbett, with scenic design by Kenneth Foy, aerial design by Paul Rubin and lighting design by Ken Billington. The production was ultimately cancelled.

=== The Little Mermaid ===
The musical, based on the 1989 animated film, began Broadway previews on November 3, 2007, and opened on January 10, 2008, at the Lunt-Fontanne Theatre, even through trouble due to the Local One stagehands strike, which ended on November 28, 2007. The world premiere took place at The Ellie Caulkins Opera House at the Denver Center of the Performing Arts in Denver, Colorado. The show features every song from the movie, as well as nine new songs written by Menken and lyricist Glenn Slater. The book was written by Pulitzer Prize and Tony Award-winning playwright Doug Wright, with direction by Francesca Zambello, choreography by Stephen Mear, scenic design by George Tsypin, costume design by Tatiana Noginova and lighting design by Natasha Katz. The musical on Broadway opened to mixed reviews.

The original Broadway cast featured Sierra Boggess as Ariel, Norm Lewis as King Triton, Sherie Rene Scott as Ursula, Eddie Korbich as Scuttle, Sean Palmer as Prince Eric, J. J. Singleton, Cody Hanford, Trevor Braun and Brian D'Addario as Flounder, and Tituss Burgess as Sebastian.

The musical closed on August 30, 2009, after 685 performances and 50 previews. In 2012, a Dutch production premiered.

=== Aladdin ===
In November 2010, Alan Menken confirmed that a musical theatre adaptation of the 1992 animated film was in the works with a book written by Chad Beguelin. The show premiered at the 5th Avenue Theatre in Seattle from July 7 to July 31, 2011. Another production played at the Muny Theatre in St. Louis from July 5 – 13, 2012. The musical premiered on Broadway on February 26, 2014 (in previews) and officially on March 20, 2014, at the New Amsterdam Theatre, taking the place of Mary Poppins, which closed on March 3, 2013. The musical had a pre-Broadway tryout at the Ed Mirvish Theatre in Toronto lasting from November 13, 2013, to January 12, 2014. Casey Nicholaw directed and choreographed, with Chad Beguelin writing the book and additional lyrics, Bob Crowley as the scene designer, and costume design by Gregg Barnes. It was also announced that the musical would open at London's West End officially in June 2016 at the Prince Edward Theatre, taking the place of the revival of Miss Saigon, which closed on 27 February 2016.

=== Frozen ===
On January 13, 2014, Disney CEO Bob Iger announced that a Broadway stage adaptation of the hit 2013 3D computer-animated musical film Frozen was in early development stages. On February 12, 2015, it was announced that the Broadway musical will be directed by two-time Tony nominee Alex Timbers and is aiming for the Broadway show to open in 2017. On February 9, 2016, it was announced that the musical was scheduled to open in spring 2018.

A private reading of the stage version of the musical Frozen was held in May 2016, with Elsa was played by Betsy Wolfe and Anna was played by Patti Murin. On September 27, 2016, Michael Grandage was selected to take over as the director after Timbers left the production, with Christopher Oram coming on board as the scenic designer.

A pre-Broadway tryout ran at the Buell Theatre in Denver, Colorado from August 17 to October 1, 2017. The original Denver and Broadway cast included Caissie Levy as Elsa, Patti Murin as Anna, Jelani Alladin as Kristoff, Greg Hildreth as Olaf, and John Riddle as Hans. Previews on Broadway at the St. James Theatre began on February 22, 2018, with the official opening on March 22, 2018. After 26 previews and 825 regular performances, Frozen had its last show on March 11, 2020. The show closed due to the COVID-19 pandemic, and on May 15, Disney announced that the show would not reopen on Broadway, but would prepare for a U.S. tour. In 2021, a production in London's West End began previews on August 27, at the Theatre Royal, Drury Lane, and opened officially on September 8, 2021, and it will close on September 8, 2024, on its 3rd anniversary. The German production, produced by Stage Entertainment, opened on November 8, 2021, at the Stage Theater an der Elbe in Hamburg after being postponed due to the COVID-19 pandemic. It transferred to the Stage Apollo Theater in Stuttgart on November 26, 2024.

=== Hercules ===
In July 2017, Alan Menken said that he is working on a stage adaptation of the 1997 film, Hercules. The Public Theater presented the world premiere of the musical from August 31 through September 8, 2019 at the Delacorte Theater. The cast included Jelani Alladin (Hercules), Roger Bart (Hades), Jeff Hiller (Panic), Nelson Chimilio (Pain), James Monroe Iglehart (Phil), Ramona Keller (Thalia), Tamika Lawrence (Calliope), Krysta Rodriguez (Meg), and Rema Webb (Terpsichore). A revised version of the musical played the Paper Mill Playhouse in Millburn, New Jersey during the 2022–23 season, from February 9 to March 12, 2023. The revised book was written by Kwame Kwei-Armah and Robert Horn. The musical opened in London's West End at Theatre Royal, Drury Lane in the summer of 2025. It closed on September 5, 2026.

=== Winnie the Pooh: The New Musical Adaptation ===
In 2019, it was reported that there had been plans to adapt the Winnie the Pooh stories into a Broadway musical with a book written by Edward Albee, but those plans were put on hold when Albee became busy. In May 2021, Disney Theatrical Productions announced that Winnie the Pooh would be adapted for a run Off-Broadway at the Theatre Row Building, starting October 21 of that year. Another production began playing at Mercury Theatre Chicago in Chicago, Illinois for a limited 13-week run lasting from March 15 to June 12, 2022.

=== Upcoming productions ===
==== The Jungle Book ====
In 2011, Variety stated that there was an "Early-stages project [of] The Jungle Book, a tuner version (with songs from the film based on Rudyard Kipling's novel) to be written and directed by Mary Zimmerman (Metamorphoses)." A joint mounting of the production was set to occur at the Goodman Theatre in Chicago and the Huntington Theatre in Boston in 2013, produced by special arrangement with Disney Theatrical Productions. As of 2015, the entire show was in storage awaiting the 2016 live action film. On May 15, 2020, Rajiv Joseph was announced to be writing the book, while Richard M. Sherman wrote new songs. Christopher Gattelli was also reported to be directing and choreographing the musical.

==== Coco ====
On January 24, 2023, during Epcot's annual Disney on Broadway concert, The Lion King actor L. Steven Taylor announced that a live stage show adaptation of the film is currently in development.

==== Tangled ====
In February 2024, it was reported that Disney Theatrical Group is developing a new stage adaptation of the film, with a workshop underway.

== Live-action adaptations ==
=== Mary Poppins ===
Cameron Mackintosh's stage adaptation of Mary Poppins had its world premiere at the Bristol Hippodrome starting with previews from September 15, 2004, before officially opening on September 18 for a limited engagement until November 6. The production then moved to the Prince Edward Theatre on December 15, 2004. It was announced in June 2007 that this production would close on January 12, 2008, after a run of more than three years. To this date it is the only Disney production to premier on the west-end.

A UK tour of Mary Poppins commenced in June 2008 and ended in April 2009.

The Broadway production opened on November 16, 2006, following a month of previews in the New Amsterdam Theater. The Broadway production closed on March 3, 2013, after 2,619 performances. A North American tour of the show began at Chicago's Cadillac Palace Theatre in March 2009.

An Australian production opened at Melbourne's Her Majesty's Theatre in July 2010.

A Dutch production opened in April 2010 at the Circus Theater in Scheveningen.

A Czech production opened at Brno City Theatre (Městské divadlo Brno) in November 2010.

A Mexican production opened at Centro Cultural Telmex on November 14, 2012, with Bianca Marroquín as Mary.

An Icelandic production opened in February 2013 at the Reykjavík City Theater. It is the most expensive, difficult and successful show to be produced in Iceland.

The Austrian production opened at Vienna Ronacher on October 1, 2014.

On October 23, 2016, a German production produced by Stage Entertainment opened in the Stage Apollo Theater in Stuttgart. The show later transferred to the Stage Theater an der Elbe in Hamburg on February 25, 2018. The production closed on August 18, 2019, after a total of 1140 performances.

In September 2018, it was announced that Mary Poppins would be receiving a west-end revival, which opened in late 2019, following the closure of Aladdin on the west-end. It re-opened at its original theater, the Prince Edward Theatre.

=== Disney's My Son Pinocchio: Geppetto's Musical Tale ===
Disney's My Son Pinocchio: Geppetto's Musical Tale is a musical based on Disney's 2000 made-for-TV movie Geppetto, which was in turn based on a book by David Stern, and features music and lyrics by Stephen Schwartz. Much like the movie, My Son Pinocchio is a re-telling of the 1883 children's book The Adventures of Pinocchio by Carlo Collodi, but the story is told from Geppetto's perspective. As in the TV film, when Pinocchio runs away to become a star in Stromboli's puppet show, Geppetto must negotiate through a maze of adventures and comic encounters to find him.

=== High School Musical ===
The hit Disney Channel movie High School Musical was adapted for the stage in 2007. It had its world professional premiere at the Theatre of the Stars in Atlanta, Georgia. A US tour began on August 1, 2007, and ended on August 3, 2008. A West End production opened in July for a limited run. High School Musical has performed internationally in Japan, Spain, Italy, South Africa, Australia, Netherlands and South Korea.

High School Musical is licensed through Music Theatre International and has been performed by over 5,000 theaters throughout the world. Currently there is a Full-Length version, One-Act Edition and JR one-hour version designed specifically for middle-school aged performances.

=== High School Musical 2 ===
A stage version of the sequel movie High School Musical 2 was released as a stage version in October 2008. Like the original, the show exists in a full-length version, One-Act Edition and a one-hour-long JR version designed for middle-school aged performers and is licensed through Music Theatre International.

=== Camp Rock ===
A musical version, based on the 2010 film Camp Rock 2: The Final Jam and features the songs from the first two Camp Rock films. The Gardiner Spring Auditorium in Ontario, California on August 5, 2010, and has performed internationally worldwide. The musical is licensed through Music Theatre International.

=== Descendants ===
A stage adaptation of the popular Disney Channel Franchise, Descendants. The stage adaptation is based on all of the movies including Descendants, Descendants 2, and the most recent installment, Descendants 3. The show includes music from the movies and animated TV series, Descendants: Wicked World, with additional music and lyrics by Madeline Smith and Nick Blaemire. The show was released through Music Theatre International on February 6, 2020.

=== Newsies ===
The show, based on the 1992 feature film, features a book by Harvey Fierstein and music by Alan Menken and Jack Feldman. A reading of the musical was held in New York on December 10, 2010. The musical premiered at the Paper Mill Playhouse (Millburn, New Jersey), in September 2011 with Jeff Calhoun as director. "Disney representatives stated that the production was not eyeing a Broadway berth, but is being explored as a property for licensing by professional and amateur groups." However, due to enthusiastic reviews, the show opened on Broadway on March 29, 2012, at the Nederlander Theatre with an open-ended run. The show was nominated for eight Tony Awards, including Best Musical, winning Best Choreography and Best Original Score. Newsies gave its final Broadway performance on August 24, 2014, while heading out for a national tour in October 2014. The production was filmed and premiered in cinemas on February 19, 2017. Both full-length and junior versions of the musicalare available for licensing via Music Theater International. The musical premiered on London's West End in 2022, closing on July 30, 2023, after an extended run at the Wembley Troubadour Park Theatre.

=== Sister Act ===
Sister Act is a musical based on the 1992 film of the same name with music by Alan Menken, lyrics by Glenn Slater, book by Bill and Cheri Steinkellner, and additional material by Douglas Carter Beane. After having a regional premiere in 2006, in Pasadena, California, the original West End production opened on June 2, 2009, at the London Palladium, starring Patina Miller. The Broadway musical was produced by Whoopi Goldberg and Stage Entertainment in association with The Shubert Organization and Disney Theatrical Productions.

=== Shakespeare in Love ===
In November 2013, Disney Theatrical Productions, announced plans to mount a stage version of the film Shakespeare in Love in London, with Sonia Friedman Productions as co-producer. The West End production played at the Noël Coward Theatre, with the world premiere scheduled for July 23, 2014. Based on the screenplay by Marc Norman and Tom Stoppard, it has been adapted for the stage by Lee Hall. The production is directed by Declan Donnellan and designed by Nick Ormerod, the driving force behind the noted theatre company, Cheek by Jowl. However, it was announced that the production would close on 18 April 2015.

=== Freaky Friday ===
A musical version of the film, with a book by Bridget Carpenter and a score by Ryan Scott Oliver, was expected to have a "developmental production" at the La Jolla Playhouse in spring 2012. Christopher Ashley was named as "likely" to be the director. A developmental lab is set for 31 March through 10 April 2015. Ultimately music and lyrics fell into the hands of Tom Kitt and Brian Yorkey of If/Then and Next To Normal fame. The premier engagement occurred at Arlington Virginia's Signature Theater from October 4 to November 20, 2016, under the direction of Christopher Ashley. The creative team included choreography by Sergio Trujillo, music supervision by Bryan Perri, orchestration by Michael Starobin / Tom Kitt, scenic design by Beowulf Boritt, costume design by Emily Rebholz, lighting by Howell Binkley and sound design by Brian Ronan and Kai Harada. The west coast engagement at the La Jolla Playhouse (January 31, 2017 – March 19, 2017) reprised most of its Signature Theatre creative team and cast. The Studio Cast Recording album was released by Walt Disney Records on February 10, 2017.

=== Bedknobs and Broomsticks ===
The musical based on the 1971 film and the stories by Mary Norton features songs from the film by The Sherman Brothers, new songs by Neil Bartram, and a book by Brian Hill. The production was produced by Michael Harrison, by special arrangement with Disney Theatrical Productions and opened in August 2021 at the Theatre Royal in Newcastle upon Tyne before embarking a UK and Ireland tour. The production was directed by Candice Edmunds and Jamie Harrison, with set and illusions also by Harrison.

=== The Greatest Showman ===
On August 9, 2024, the Disney Theatrical Group announced that a stage musical adaptation of the 2017 film was in development. The musical is Disney's first stage adaptation of a 20th Century Studios film following Disney's 2019 acquisition of 21st Century Fox.

On 15 March 2026, it was confirmed that the show premiered in the Bristol Hippodrome. The cast was led by Oliver Tompsett and Samantha Barks. The musical is scheduled to open 5 May 2027 at Theatre Royal Drury Lane with Tompsett and Barks reprising their roles.

=== Cancelled productions ===
==== Alice in Wonderland ====
In 2011, Disney Theatrical was in early talks with Tim Burton and screenwriter Linda Woolverton, to develop the 2010 film into a Broadway musical. Woolverton authored the screenplay for Disney's The Lion King and is also the Tony Award-nominated book writer of Beauty and the Beast, Aida, and Lestat. Burton was planned to also render the overall designs for the stage musical. Woolverton was planned to adapt her screenplay for the stage production. Neither a composer nor songwriter were publicly announced. Robert Jess Roth was set to helm the stage musical that would have choreography by Matt West. The duo also collaborated on Disney's first Broadway outing: Beauty and the Beast. No casting was announced. With no updates or announcements on the project in over a decade, this musical is presumably no longer in development.

==== Father of the Bride ====
In 2011, a stage musical version of the film Father of the Bride was in development with Bartlett Sher as its expected director. This musical is also presumably no longer in development.

== Other adaptations ==
=== King David ===
King David is a musical, sometimes described as a modern oratorio, with a book and lyrics by Tim Rice and music by Alan Menken. The musical is based on Biblical tales from the Books of Samuel and 1 Chronicles, as well as text from David's Psalms.

=== Aida ===
Aida is a musical that debuted in March 2000, with lyrics by Tim Rice and music by Elton John. It is based on the opera of the same name by Giuseppe Verdi.

=== On the Record ===
Debuting in November 2004, the show brought together 60 Disney songs from 1930 right up to 2004. They are woven together loosely by a storyline which is set in a recording studio with young (and old) performers using the songs to express their moods and the interrelationships among the characters they portray. The show played at the National Theatre in Washington D.C., as well as other theatres on a national tour.

=== Peter and the Starcatcher ===
Disney Theatrical Productions and La Jolla Playhouse (California) adapted Peter and the Starcatchers, which is a prequel to the Peter Pan story, into a play with music. The new play is written by Rick Elice, co-directed by Roger Rees and Alex Timbers, and is based on the novel by Dave Barry and Ridley Pearson. It was produced as part of La Jolla Playhouse's Page to Stage program, and ran from February 13, 2009, through March 8, 2009. An Off Broadway production opened at New York Theatre Workshop It moved to Broadway on April 15, 2012. The show ended its Broadway run on January 20, 2013, and reopened Off-Broadway once again at New World Stages in March 2013.

== Non-stage productions ==
=== Backstage with Disney On Broadway ===
The ABC television special Backstage with Disney On Broadway: Celebrating 20 Years aired on December 14, 2014. ABC's "Nashville" TV show duo, Clare Bowen and Sam Palladio, performed "Pinocchio", "Bambi", "Cinderella", "Mary Poppins", "The Jungle Book", "The Little Mermaid", "Beauty and the Beast", "Aladdin", "The Lion King", "The Hunchback of Notre Dame", "Hercules", "Mulan", and "Tarzan". in a thirteen musicals for the special.

=== Newsies ===
On the 25th anniversary of the original film's theatrical release, April 10, 2017, it was announced the filmed stage production of the musical Newsies would be released for digital download on May 23, 2017. Some alumni from the Broadway production reprised their leading roles, notably Jeremy Jordan as Jack, Kara Lindsay as Katherine, Ben Fankhauser as Davey, Andrew Keenan-Bolger as Crutchie and Tommy Bracco as Spot Conlon.Several ensemble tracks were added to the show to provide roles for swings. A two-day encore presentation of the production was shown in theaters on August 5 and 9, 2017.

=== Freaky Friday ===
Freaky Friday is an American musical television film that premiered as a Disney Channel Original Movie on August 10, 2018. Based on the 2016 Disney Theatrical Productions stage adaptation by Bridget Carpenter; the movie is the fourth feature film installment in the Freaky Friday franchise. The adaptation stars Cozi Zuehlsdorff and Heidi Blickenstaff.

=== Frozen ===
Frozen was filmed at The Theatre Royal Drury Lane in London and was released on Disney+ on June 20, 2025.

=== Aladdin ===
Aladdin was filmed at The Prince Edward Theatre in London and was originally set to premiere exclusively on Disney+ in 2022, on the 30th Anniversary of the original 1992 film, but the release date was pushed back until further notice.
