= Richard Maltby Jr. =

American screenwriter

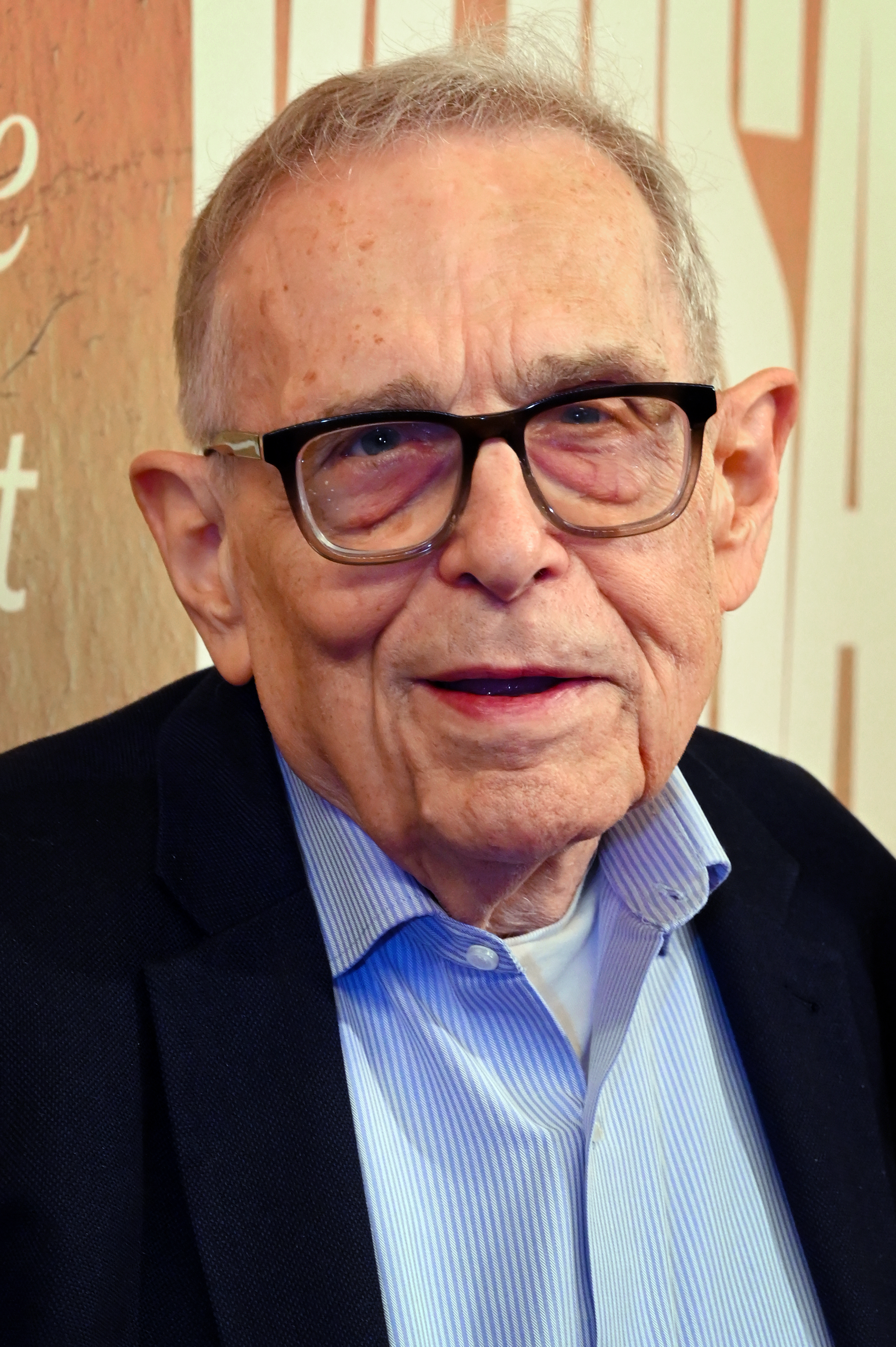
- Maltby in 2025
- Born: Richard Eldridge Maltby Jr. October 6, 1937 (age 88); Ripon, Wisconsin, United States
- Occupations: Theatre director, producer, lyricist, screenwriter
- Parent(s): Richard Maltby, Sr. Virginia (née Hosegood)

Richard Eldridge Maltby Jr. (born October 6, 1937) is an American theatre director and producer, lyricist, and screenwriter. He conceived and directed the only two musical revues to win the Tony Award for Best Musical: Ain't Misbehavin' (1978: Tony, N.Y. Drama Critics, Outer Critics, Drama Desk Awards, also Tony Award for Best Director) and Fosse (1999: Tony, Outer Critics, Drama Desk Awards).

== Life and career ==
Maltby was born in Ripon, Wisconsin, the son of Virginia (née Hosegood) and Richard Maltby Sr., a well-known orchestra leader.

Maltby and David Shire started working together as students at Yale University (where he was a member of Manuscript Society); their first Broadway credit was in 1968, when their song "The Girl of the Minute" was used in the revue New Faces of 1968. In 1977 the Manhattan Theatre Club produced a revue of their earlier songs, written for other works, finally titled Starting Here, Starting Now. With composer Shire, Maltby was the director and lyricist for Baby (1983, book by Sybille Pearson), director and lyricist for Closer Than Ever (1989), and lyricist for Big (1996, book by John Weidman). Also with Shire, he conceived and wrote the lyrics for Take Flight (book by John Weidman), which had its world premiere in July 2007 at the Menier Chocolate Factory in London.About Time (a sequel to Starting Here, Starting Now and Closer Than Ever), with music by Shire and lyrics and direction by Maltby, premiered in May 2025 at Goodspeed Musicals Norma Terris Theatre, and was subsequently produced at 54 Below in November 2025.

He was director/co-lyricist for the American version of Andrew Lloyd Webber's Song and Dance, (1986) starring Bernadette Peters. He was co-lyricist for Miss Saigon (Evening Standard Award 1990; Tony nomination: Best Score, 1991).

He also conceived and directed Ring of Fire, a musical about Johnny Cash, which ran on Broadway in 2006. He is co-bookwriter/lyricist for The Pirate Queen (2007). He was most recently represented on Broadway as the director of the new, original musical The Story of My Life by composer/lyricist Neil Bartram and book writer Brian Hill. That musical had a brief run at the Booth Theatre in February 2009. and received a 2009 Drama Desk Award nomination for outstanding production of a musical.

Since 1976 he has constructed the monthly cryptic crossword puzzles for Harper's Magazine, formerly in collaboration with E. R. Galli. He constructed cryptic crosswords for New York Magazine in the late 1960s.

== Personal life ==
Maltby married twice: first to Barbara Black Sudler on June 5, 1965 (they had two children, Nicholas and David), and second, in 1987, to Janet Brenner (they had three children, Jordan, Emily, and Charlotte). He now has seven grandchildren: Liam, Owen, Matt, Aidan, Emma, Lionel, and Jesse Maltby.

== Work ==
Broadway

- Ain't Misbehavin', 1978 (Director/Co-lyricist)
- Baby, 1983 (Director/Lyricist)
- Blood Knot, 1985 (Producer)
- Song and Dance, 1986 (Director/Co-lyricist)
- Miss Saigon, 1989 (Lyricist)
- Nick & Nora, 1991 (Lyricist)
- Big, 1996 (Lyricist)
- Fosse, 1999 (Director)
- Bea Arthur on Broadway, 2002 (Production Consultant)
- Ring of Fire, 2006 (Creator/Director)
- The Pirate Queen, 2007 (Writer/Lyricist)
- The Story of My Life, 2009 (Director)

Off-Broadway

- Closer Than Ever, (1989, two Outer Critics Circle Awards: Best Musical, Best Score) with David Shire
- Starting Here, Starting Now, director/lyricist (1977 Grammy nomination) with David Shire

Regional

- Love Match, lyricist (1968, Ahmanson Theatre, Los Angeles)
- The 60's Project, director, (2006, Goodspeed Opera House)
- Waterfall, book and lyrics; David Shire music (2015), Pasadena Playhouse
- Sousatzka, lyricist (2017), Elgin Theatre, Toronto
- About Time, lyricist and director, David Shire music, (2025, Norma Terris Theatre at Goodspeed Opera House, CT)

Film

- Miss Potter, (2007), Screenplay, starring Renée Zellweger and Ewan McGregor (Christopher Award, best screenplay)

== Awards and nominations ==
Awards

- 1978 Tony Award for Best Direction of a Musical – Ain't Misbehavin'
- 1990 Outer Critics Circle Award for Best Score – Closer Than Ever
- 2001 Laurence Olivier Award – Fosse

Nominations

- 1977 Grammy Award for Best Original Cast Recording – Starting Here, Starting Now
- 1984 Drama Desk Award for Outstanding Lyrics – Baby
- 1984 Tony Award for Best Direction of a Musical – Baby
- 1984 Tony Award for Best Original Score – Baby
- 1986 Tony Award for Best Direction of a Musical – Song and Dance
- 1986 Tony Award for Best Musical – Song and Dance
- 1986 Tony Award for Best Original Score – Song and Dance
- 1986 Tony Award for Best Play – Blood Knot
- 1990 Drama Desk Award for Outstanding Lyrics – Closer Than Ever
- 1991 Tony Award for Best Original Score – Miss Saigon
- 1992 Tony Award for Best Original Score – Nick & Nora
- 1996 Drama Desk Award for Outstanding Lyrics – Big
- 1996 Tony Award for Best Original Score – Big
- 1999 Tony Award for Best Direction of a Musical (with Ann Reinking) – Fosse
- 1999 Drama Desk Award for Outstanding Director of a Musical – Fosse
