= Alan Maley =

British visual effects artist (1931–1995)

- Born: 7 January 1931; Surrey, England
- Died: 13 May 1995 (aged 64); Belvedere, California, US
- Occupation: Visual effects artist
- Years active: 1959–1981
- Spouse: Pamela
- Children: 2, Caroline and Andrew

Alan Maley (7 January 1931 – 13 May 1995) was a British visual effects artist as well as a matte painter.

He won at the 44th Academy Awards in the category of Best Visual Effects for his work on Bedknobs and Broomsticks. His win was shared with Danny Lee and Eustace Lycett.

Alan was an internationally recognized artist known for works depicting scenes of life around the turn of the 20th century. His paintings often feature historical settings, everyday activities, and figures presented in late 19th-century environments. His style has been associated with romanticized portrayals of a more leisurely era, combining detailed period imagery with scenes of social and cultural life.
