= The Magic Bedknob =

1944 children's book by Mary Norton

- First edition (UK)
- Author: Mary Norton
- Original title: The Magic Bedknob; or, How to Become a Witch in Ten Easy Lessons
- Illustrator: Kiddell Monroe (UK)
- Language: English
- Genre: Fantasy
- Publisher: J. M. Dent & Sons (UK); G. P. Putnam's Sons (US)
- Publication date: 1944
- Publication place: Great Britain
- Pages: 192
- ISBN: 978-0460881807
- Followed by: Bonfires and Broomsticks

The Magic Bedknob; or, How to Become a Witch in Ten Easy Lessons is a 1944 children's book by Mary Norton. The book and its sequel were adapted into the 1971 Disney film Bedknobs and Broomsticks.

== Synopsis ==
While spending the summer in Bedfordshire, England, Carey, Charles and Paul meet Miss Price, the old spinster next door. When Paul sees Miss Price riding a broomstick, the children realize she is a witch. In return for their silence, Miss Price casts a spell on a knob from the bed so that when the knob is turned, the bed will fly wherever they wish to go. The children take the bed on various magical adventures.

== Omnibus ==
The book and its 1947 sequel Bonfires and Broomsticks were combined into the omnibus Bedknob and Broomstick in 1957, illustrated by Erik Blegvad.
