= The Theory of Relativity (musical) =

Canadian 2014 musical

- Original stage musical poster
- Music: Neil Bartram
- Lyrics: Neil Bartram
- Book: Brian Hill
- Productions: 2014 Goodspeed Musicals

The Theory of Relativity is a musical with music and lyrics by Neil Bartram, and a book by Brian Hill. The show explores how young adults deal with their personal feelings and situations and how they develop communities based on their shared experiences.

== Plot ==
The musical, featuring songs and monologues, explores how young adults, searching for human connection, deal with their personal feelings and situations and, as well, how they develop communities based on their shared experiences.

== Productions ==
The musical was commissioned by Canadian Music Theatre Project at Sheridan College in Toronto in 2012. The show was first presented in 2014 as part of the Festival of New Musicals at Goodspeed Musicals in East Haddam, Connecticut. Later, in the Spring of 2015, the musical was presented more fully in the Norma Terris Theatre at Goodspeed Musicals.

In 2020 and 2021, The Theory of Relativity was the most produced high school musical in Music Theatre International's catalog.

== Song list ==
The Original Cast Recording (various artists) was produced by PS Classics in 2016.

- Person A
- Relativity
- I'm Allergic To Cats
- Pi, Part 1
- The End of the Line
- The End of the Line Playoff
- Great Expectations
- Relativity (Reprise 1)
- Footprint
- Pi, Part 2
- Lipstick
- Apples & Oranges
- Me & Ricky
- Promise Me This
- Julie's song
- Pi, Part 3
- Relative Pitch
- You Will Never Know
- Person A (Reprise)
- Nothing Without You

== Response ==
Reviewer Michael Grossberg of The Columbus Dispatch writes, "Refreshingly youthful in topic and tone, “The Theory of Relativity” is a modest but winsome ensemble musical with rueful insights and lilting melodies that evoke a pivotal stage of life with moving freshness". Reviewer Jared Echevarria of Broadway World notes that the musical has "well-written songs" and is a "coming-of-age story that would surely remind you of how you were in your student years". Reviewer Breeze Barrington of LondonTheatre1 comments that the musical is "an unexpected delight", and that in the show, by being set on the science of Einstein's theory, "we [experience] the randomness of human life and interaction, and [see] first-hand the ‘messiness’ that human's feel and experience on a daily basis". This reviewer concludes, "I defy anyone, whatever may be happening in their lives, to leave this production without feeling renewed hope, being profoundly uplifted, and having learned at least a little bit more about science."

== See also ==
- List of musicals by composer: A to L
- Theory of Relativity
