= Sentinels of Silence =

1971 Mexican documentary film

- Directed by: Robert Amram
- Written by: Robert Amram
- Produced by: Manuel Arango
- Starring: Ricardo Montalbán; Orson Welles
- Cinematography: Jim Freeman; Gustavo Olguin
- Edited by: Alex Beaton
- Production company: Producciones Concord
- Distributed by: Paramount Pictures (United States); Cinema International Corporation (United Kingdom)
- Release date: March 1971 (Cannes Film Festival)
- Running time: 18 minutes
- Country: Mexico
- Language: Spanish

Sentinels of Silence (Spanish: Centinelas del silencio) is a 1971 short documentary film on ancient Mexican civilizations. The film was produced by Manuel Arango, and directed and written by the filmmaker Robert Amram. It is notable for being the first and only short film to win two Academy Awards.

== Plot ==
Sentinels of Silence provides an 18-minute helicopter-based aerial visit across the archeological ruins in Mexico including Teotihuacan, Monte Albán, Mitla, Tulum, Palenque, Chichen Itza and Uxmal. The film’s narration details pre-Columbian Mayan culture, focusing on its achievements in mathematics and astronomy, and then questions how and why the Mayan society seemed to disappear, leaving behind its structures as the eponymous silent sentinels.

== Production ==
Sentinels of Silence was released in English and Spanish versions, with Orson Welles providing the English-language narration and Ricardo Montalbán providing the Spanish-language narration. Both versions included a symphonic score by Mariano Moreno. Paramount Pictures acquired this production for U.S. theatrical release.

== Academy Awards ==
Sentinels of Silence won two Academy Awards in 1972; one for Best Short Subject and one for Best Documentary Short Subject. This was the only time that a short film won Oscars in two categories. Afterwards, the Academy changed its rules to prevent documentaries from competing against narrative films in the Best Short Subject category.

== Home video and non-theatrical release ==
Sentinels of Silence was released on VHS video by ALTI Publishing in 1990 under the new title "Sentinels of Silence: The Ruins of Ancient Mexico." To date, the film has not been made available on DVD. Although the film is no longer in theatrical circulation, the government of Mexico continues to present the film in non-theatrical screenings at its embassies and consulates around the world.

There is, however, a DVD edition distributed by Mexico Antiguo, for sale only in Mexico.

== See also ==
- Orson Welles filmography
