= 44th Academy Awards =

- Date: April 10, 1972
- Site: Dorothy Chandler Pavilion, Los Angeles, California
- Hosted by: Helen Hayes, Alan King, Sammy Davis Jr. and Jack Lemmon
- Produced by: Howard W. Koch
- Directed by: Marty Pasetta

Highlights
- Best Picture: The French Connection
- Most awards: The French Connection (5)
- Most nominations: Fiddler on the Roof, The French Connection, and The Last Picture Show (8)

TV in the United States
- Network: NBC

The 44th Academy Awards were presented April 10, 1972, at the Dorothy Chandler Pavilion in Los Angeles. The ceremonies were presided over by Helen Hayes, Alan King, Sammy Davis Jr., and Jack Lemmon. One of the highlights of the evening was one of the last public appearances of Betty Grable, who died the following year. She appeared alongside one of her leading men from the 1940s, singer Dick Haymes, to present the musical scoring awards. This was the first time in Awards history that the nominees were shown in superimposed pictures while being announced. Around seventy-five million viewers watched the ceremony.

== Winners and nominees ==
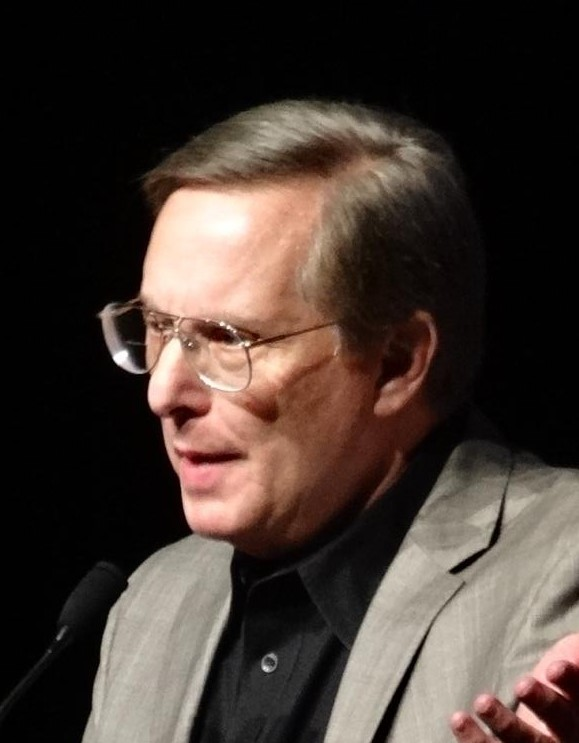
William Friedkin, Best Director winner

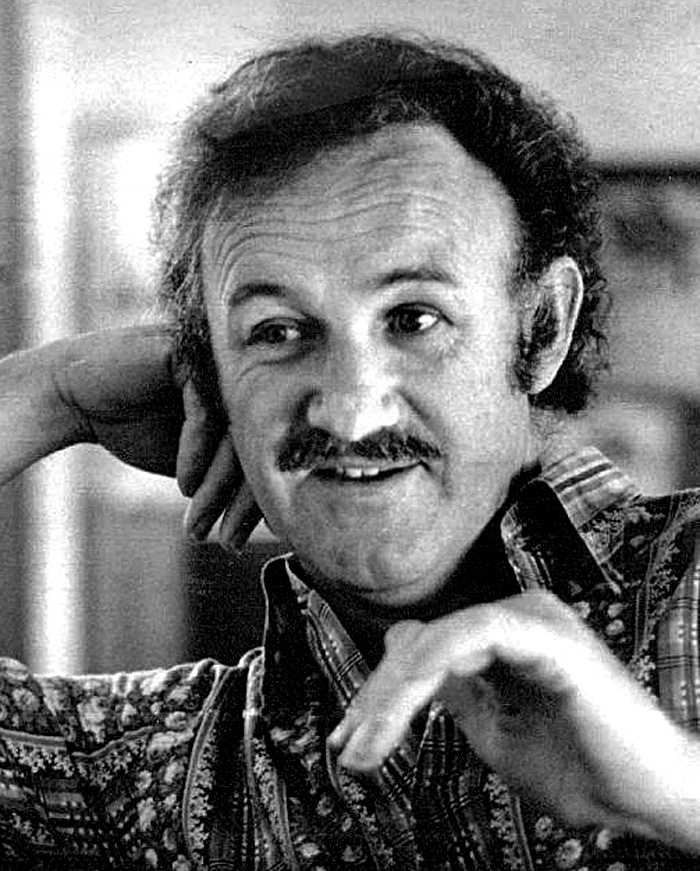
Gene Hackman, Best Actor winner

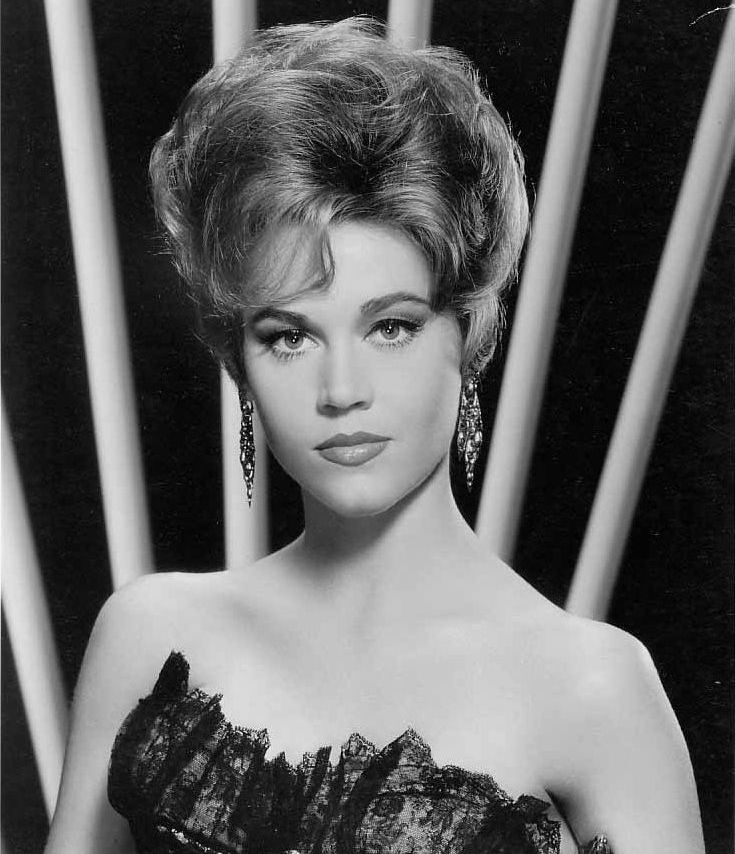
Jane Fonda, Best Actress winner

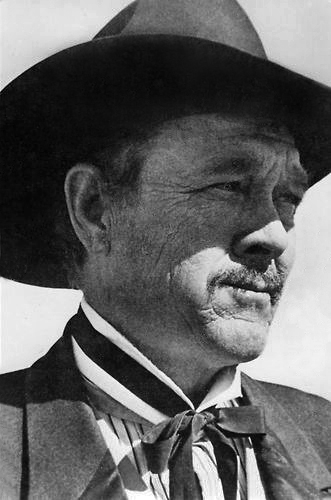
Ben Johnson, Best Supporting Actor winner

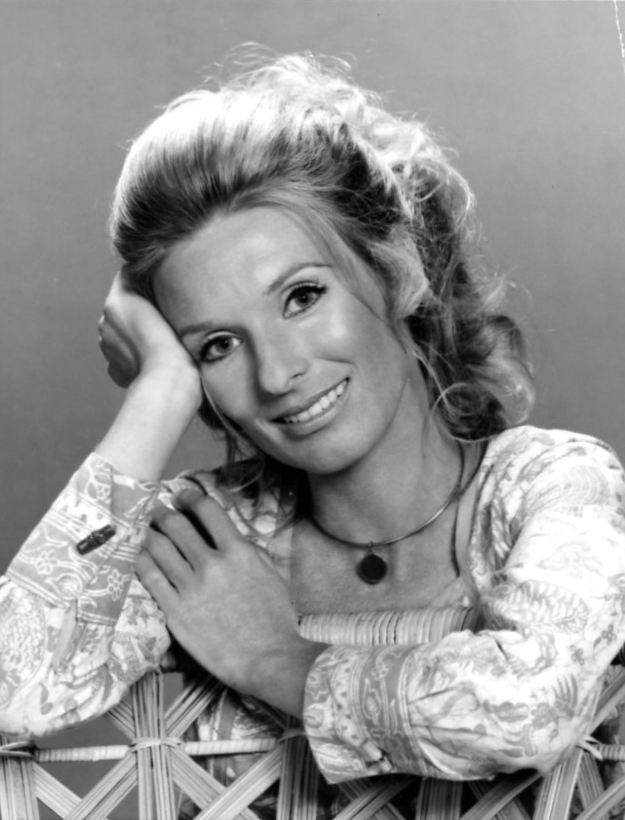
Cloris Leachman, Best Supporting Actress winner

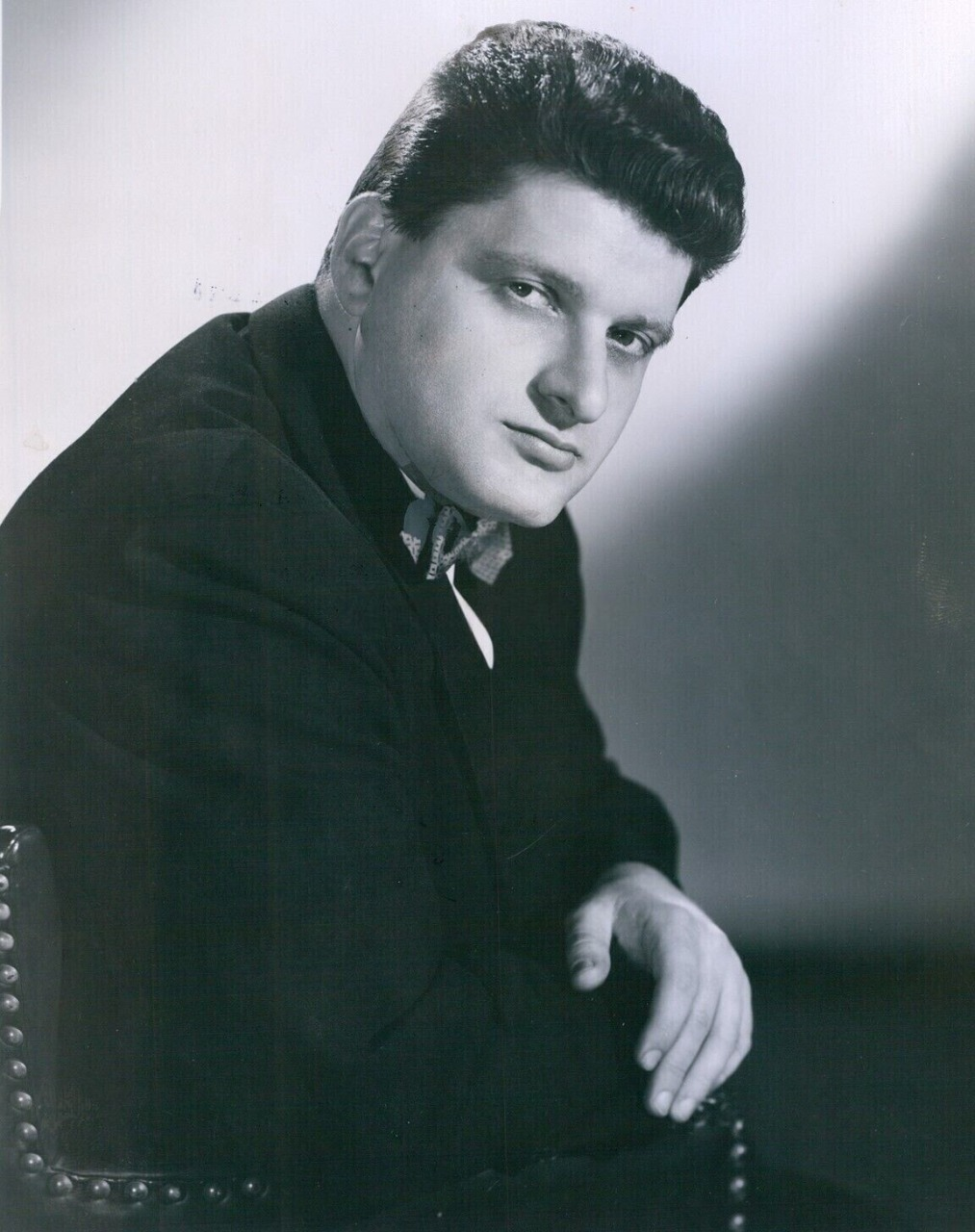
Paddy Chayefsky, Best Story and Screenplay Based on Factual Material or Material Not Previously Produced or Published winner

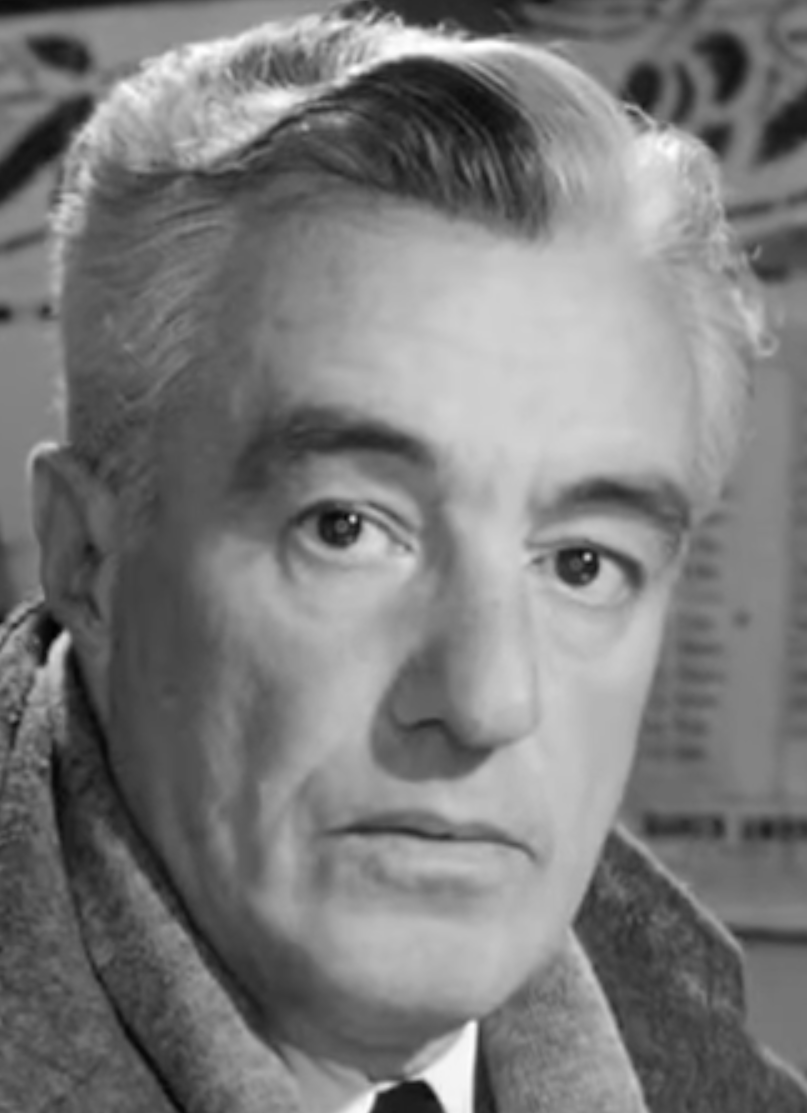
Vittorio De Sica, Best Foreign Language Film winner

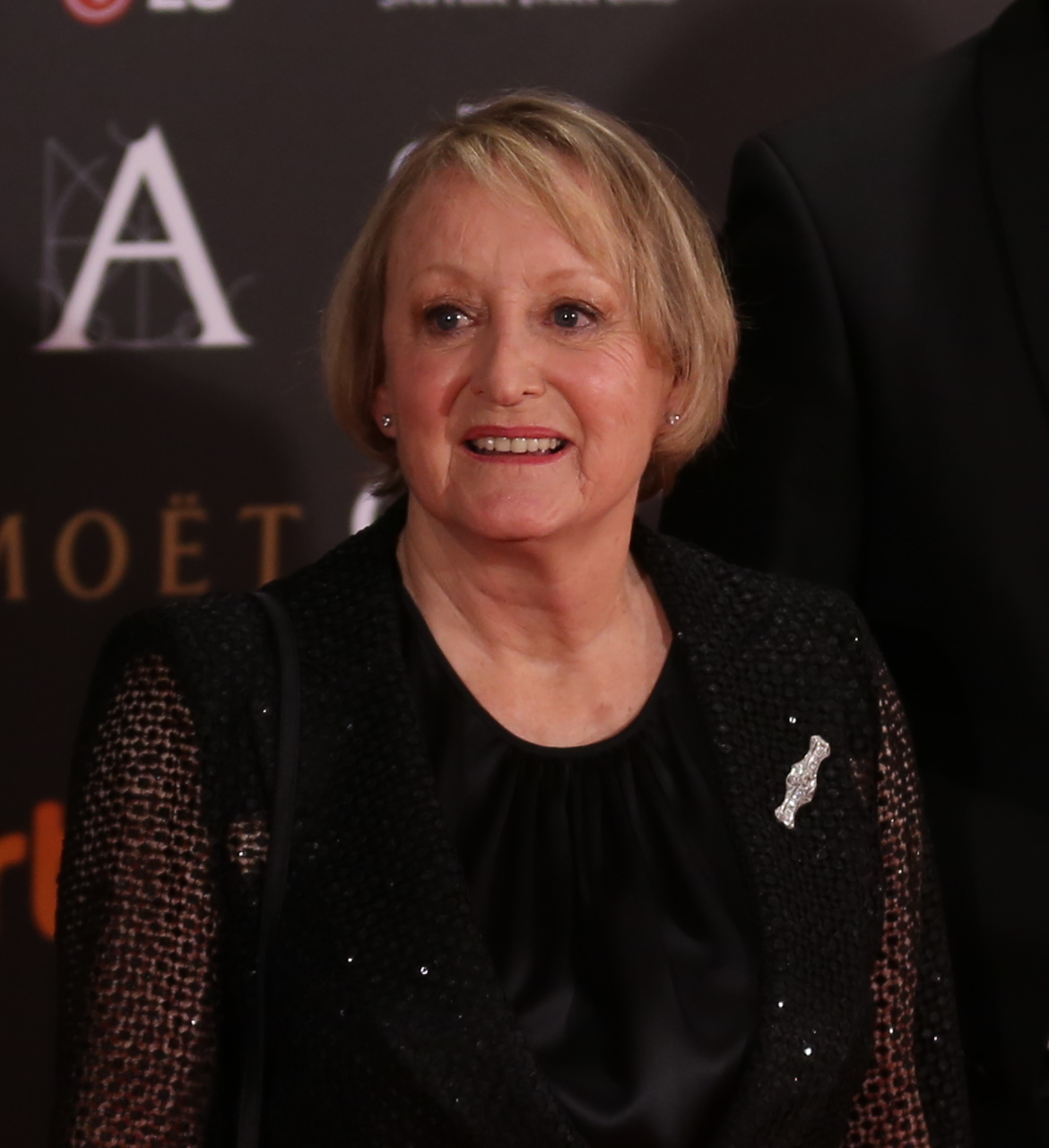
Yvonne Blake, Best Costume Design co-winner

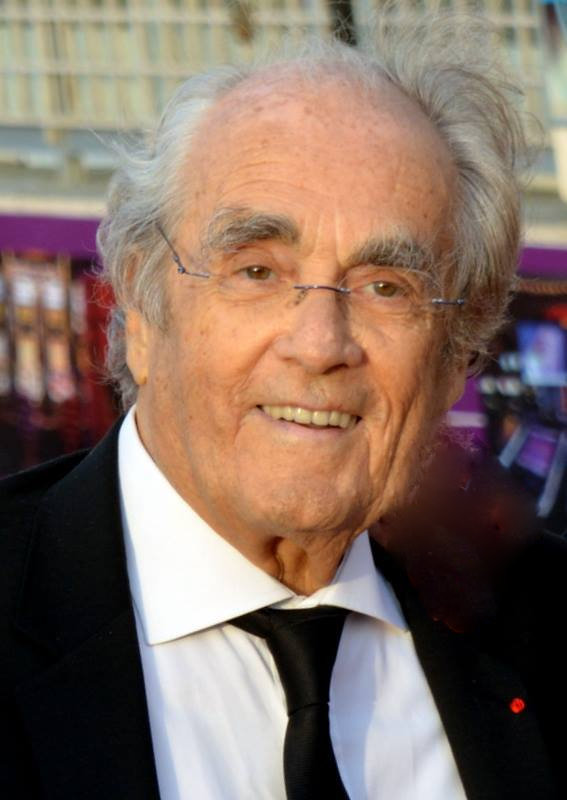
Michel Legrand, Best Original Dramatic Score winner

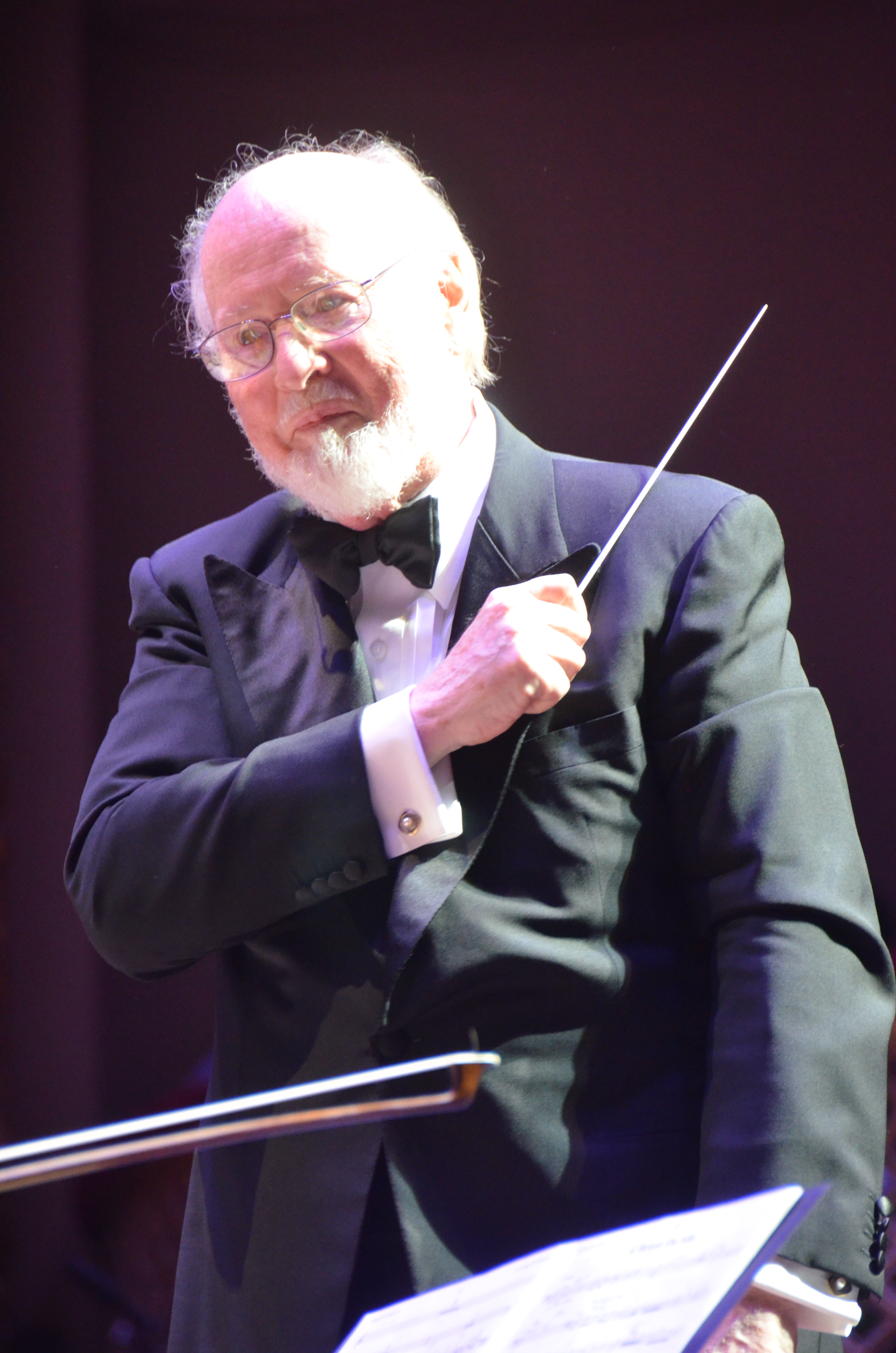
John Williams, Best Scoring: Adaptation and Original Song Score winner

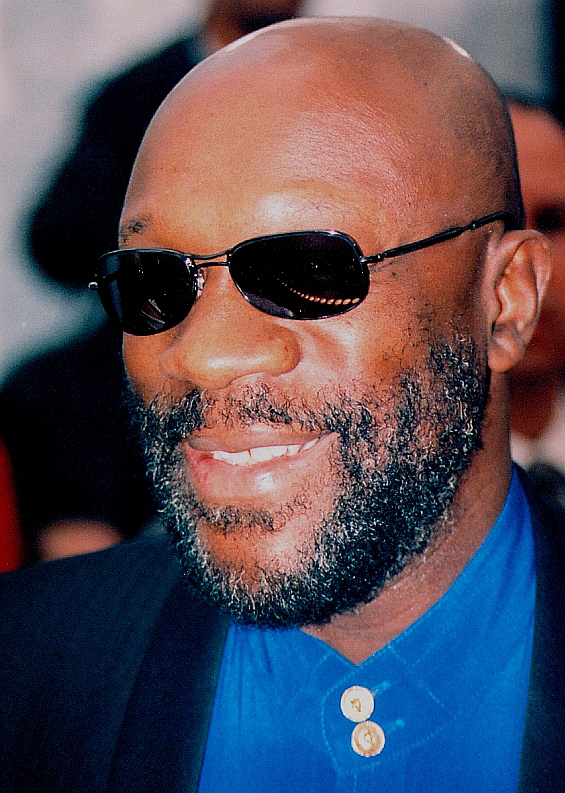
Isaac Hayes, Best Song Original for the Picture winner

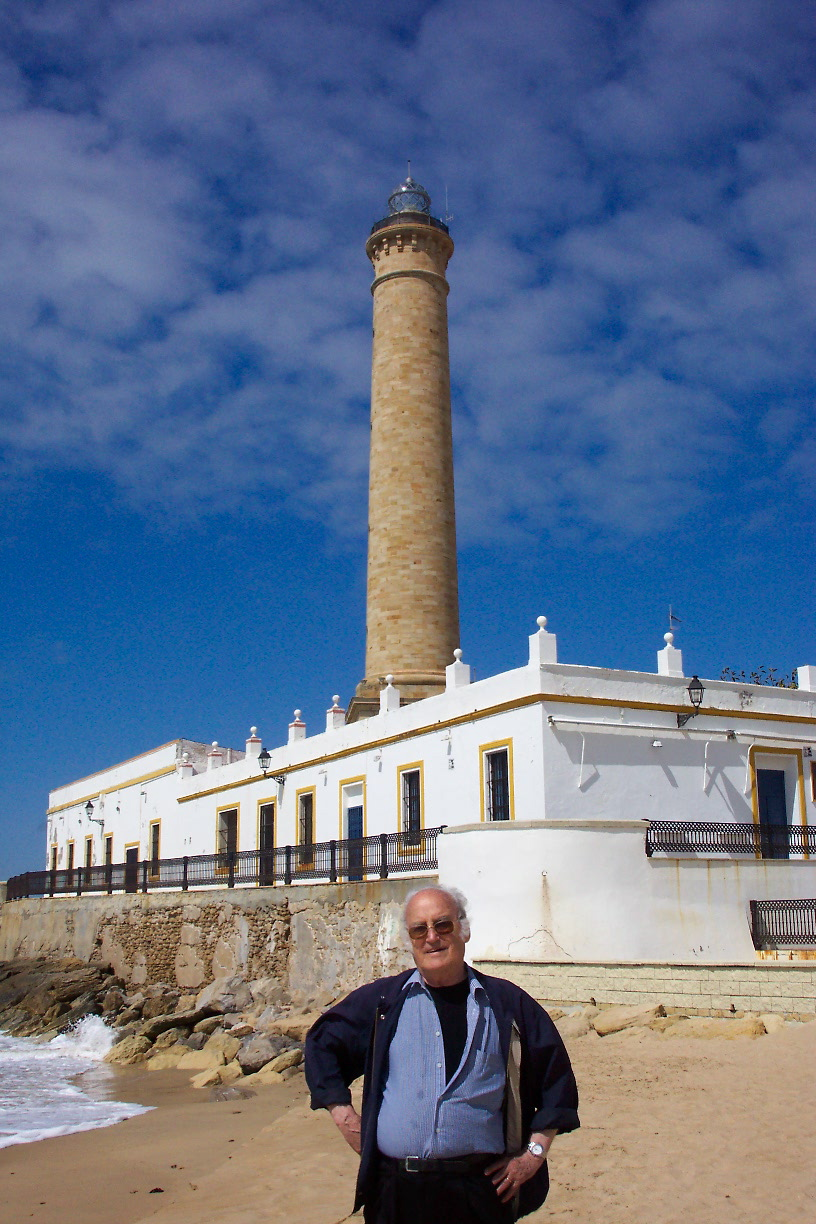
Gil Parrondo, Best Art Direction co-winner

=== Awards ===
Nominations announced on February 22, 1972. Winners are listed first and highlighted in boldface.

**Best Picture**: **The French Connection – Philip D'Antoni, producer**; A Clockwork Orange – Stanley Kubrick, producer; Fiddler on the Roof – Norman Jewison, producer; The Last Picture Show – Stephen J. Friedman, producer; Nicholas and Alexandra – Sam Spiegel, producer	**Best Directing**: **William Friedkin – The French Connection**; Stanley Kubrick – A Clockwork Orange; Norman Jewison – Fiddler on the Roof; Peter Bogdanovich – The Last Picture Show; John Schlesinger – Sunday Bloody Sunday
**Best Actor**: **Gene Hackman – The French Connection as Det. Jimmy "Popeye" Doyle**; Peter Finch – Sunday Bloody Sunday as Dr. Daniel Hirsch; Walter Matthau – Kotch as Joseph P. Kotcher; George C. Scott – The Hospital as Dr. Herbert "Herb" Bock; Chaim Topol – Fiddler on the Roof as Tevye	**Best Actress**: **Jane Fonda – Klute as Bree Daniels**; Julie Christie – McCabe & Mrs. Miller as Constance Miller; Glenda Jackson – Sunday Bloody Sunday as Alex Greville; Vanessa Redgrave – Mary, Queen of Scots as Mary, Queen of Scots; Janet Suzman – Nicholas and Alexandra as Empress Alexandra
**Best Actor in a Supporting Role**: **Ben Johnson – The Last Picture Show as Sam the Lion**; Jeff Bridges – The Last Picture Show as Duane Jackson; Leonard Frey – Fiddler on the Roof as Motel Kamzoil; Richard Jaeckel – Sometimes a Great Notion as Joe Ben Stamper; Roy Scheider – The French Connection as Det. Buddy 'Cloudy' Russo	**Best Actress in a Supporting Role**: **Cloris Leachman – The Last Picture Show as Ruth Popper**; Ann-Margret – Carnal Knowledge as Bobbie; Ellen Burstyn – The Last Picture Show as Lois Farrow; Barbara Harris – Who Is Harry Kellerman and Why Is He Saying Those Terrible Things About Me? as Allison Densmore; Margaret Leighton – The Go-Between as Mrs. Maudsley
**Best Writing (Story and Screenplay -- Based on Factual Material or Material Not Previously Published or Produced)**: **The Hospital – Paddy Chayefsky**; Investigation of a Citizen Above Suspicion – Elio Petri and Ugo Pirro; Klute – Andy Lewis and Dave Lewis; Summer of '42 – Herman Raucher; Sunday Bloody Sunday – Penelope Gilliatt	**Best Writing (Screenplay -- Based on Material from Another Medium)**: **The French Connection – Ernest Tidyman based on the book by Robin Moore**; A Clockwork Orange – Stanley Kubrick based on the novel by Anthony Burgess; The Conformist – Bernardo Bertolucci based on the novel Il Conformista by Alberto Moravia; The Garden of the Finzi-Continis – Vittorio Bonicelli and Ugo Pirro based on the novel by Giorgio Bassani; The Last Picture Show – Peter Bogdanovich and Larry McMurtry based on the novel by Larry McMurtry
**Best Foreign Language Film**: **The Garden of the Finzi-Continis (Italy) in Italian – Vittorio De Sica**; Dodes'ka-den (Japan) in Japanese – Akira Kurosawa; The Emigrants (Sweden) in Swedish – Jan Troell; The Policeman (Israel) in Hebrew – Ephraim Kishon; Tchaikovsky (USSR) in Russian – Igor Talankin	**Best Documentary (Feature)**: **The Hellstrom Chronicle – Walon Green**; Alaska Wilderness Lake – Alan Landsburg; On Any Sunday – Bruce Brown; Ra – Lennart Ehrenborg and Thor Heyerdahl; The Sorrow and the Pity – Marcel Ophüls
**Best Documentary (Short Subject)**: **Sentinels of Silence – Robert Amram and Manuel Arango**; Adventures in Perception – Han van Gelder; Art Is... – Julian Krainin and DeWitt L. Sage Jr.; The Numbers Start with the River – Donald Wrye; Somebody Waiting – Sherwood Omens, Hal Riney and Dick Snider	**Best Short Subject (Live Action)**: **Sentinels of Silence – Robert Amram and Manuel Arango**; Good Morning – Denny Evans and Ken Greenwald; The Rehearsal – Stephen F. Verona
**Best Short Subject (Animated)**: **The Crunch Bird – Ted Petok**; Evolution – Michael Mills; The Selfish Giant – Peter Sander and Murray Shostak	**Best Music (Original Dramatic Score)**: **Summer of '42 – Michel Legrand**; Mary, Queen of Scots – John Barry; Nicholas and Alexandra – Richard Rodney Bennett; Shaft – Isaac Hayes; Straw Dogs – Jerry Fielding
**Best Music (Scoring: Adaptation and Original Song Score)**: **Fiddler on the Roof – Adapted by John Williams**; Bedknobs and Broomsticks – Adapted by Irwin Kostal; Song Score by The Sherman Brothers: Robert B. and Richard M.; The Boy Friend – Adapted by Peter Maxwell Davies and Peter Greenwell; Tchaikovsky – Adapted by Dimitri Tiomkin; Willy Wonka & the Chocolate Factory – Adapted by Walter Scharf; Song Score by Leslie Bricusse and Anthony Newley	**Best Music (Song -- Original for the Picture)**: **"Theme from Shaft" from Shaft – Music and Lyrics by Isaac Hayes**; "The Age of Not Believing" from Bedknobs and Broomsticks – Music and Lyrics by Robert Sherman and Richard Sherman; "All His Children" from Sometimes a Great Notion – Music by Henry Mancini; Lyrics by Alan and Marilyn Bergman; "Bless the Beasts and Children" from Bless the Beasts and Children – Music and Lyrics by Perry Botkin Jr. and Barry De Vorzon; "Life Is What You Make It" from Kotch – Music by Marvin Hamlisch; Lyrics by Johnny Mercer
**Best Sound**: **Fiddler on the Roof – David Hildyard and Gordon K. McCallum**; Diamonds Are Forever – Gordon K. McCallum, John W. Mitchell and Alfred J. Overton; The French Connection – Christopher Newman and Theodore Soderberg; Kotch – Richard Portman and Jack Solomon; Mary, Queen of Scots – John Aldred and Bob Jones	**Best Art Direction**: **Nicholas and Alexandra – Art Direction: Ernest Archer, John Box, Jack Maxsted and Gil Parrondo; Set Decoration: Vernon Dixon**; The Andromeda Strain – Art Direction: Boris Leven and William H. Tuntke; Set Decoration: Ruby R. Levitt; Bedknobs and Broomsticks – Art Direction: Peter Ellenshaw and John B. Mansbridge; Set Decoration: Hal Gausman and Emile Kuri; Fiddler on the Roof – Art Direction: Robert F. Boyle and Michael Stringer; Set Decoration: Peter Lamont; Mary, Queen of Scots – Art Direction: Terence Marsh and Robert Cartwright; Set Decoration: Peter Howitt
**Best Cinematography**: **Fiddler on the Roof – Oswald Morris**; The French Connection – Owen Roizman; The Last Picture Show – Robert Surtees; Nicholas and Alexandra – Freddie Young; Summer of '42 – Robert Surtees	**Best Costume Design**: **Nicholas and Alexandra – Yvonne Blake and Antonio Castillo**; Bedknobs and Broomsticks – Bill Thomas; Death in Venice – Piero Tosi; Mary, Queen of Scots – Margaret Furse; What's the Matter with Helen? – Morton Haack
**Best Film Editing**: **The French Connection – Gerald B. Greenberg**; The Andromeda Strain – Stuart Gilmore (posthumous nomination) and John W. Holmes; A Clockwork Orange – Bill Butler; Kotch – Ralph E. Winters; Summer of '42 – Folmar Blangsted	**Best Special Visual Effects**: **Bedknobs and Broomsticks – Danny Lee, Eustace Lycett and Alan Maley**; When Dinosaurs Ruled the Earth – Jim Danforth and Roger Dicken

=== Honorary Award ===
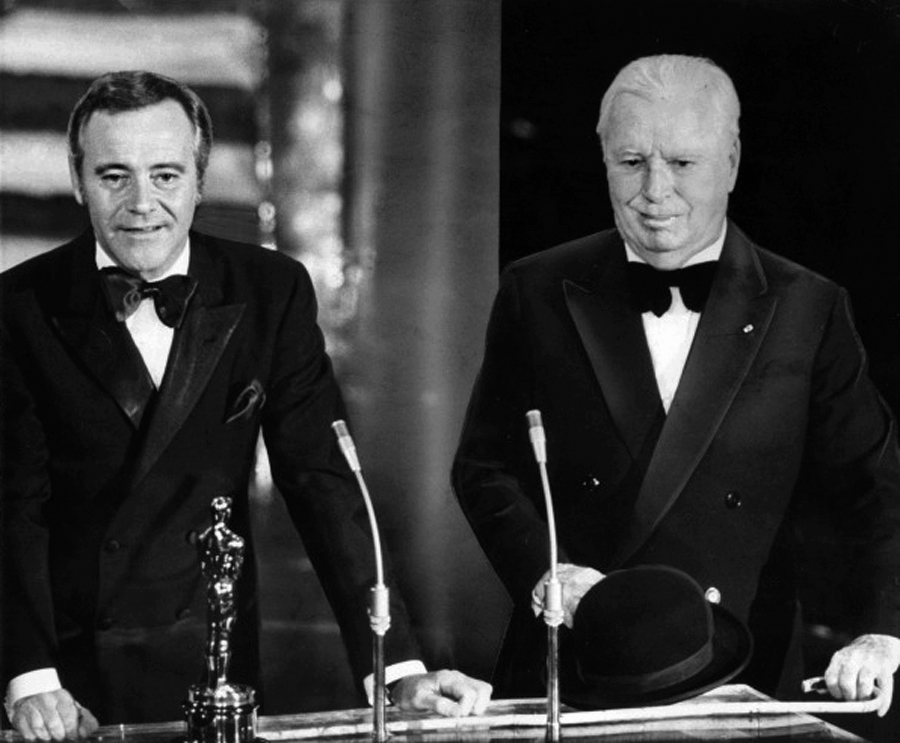
Charlie Chaplin (right) receiving his Honorary Academy Award from Jack Lemmon (left).

- To Charles Chaplin for the incalculable effect he has had in making motion pictures the art form of this century.

Chaplin, who had been living in self-imposed exile in Switzerland for twenty years, went back to the United States to re-market his older films and to receive this award. When introduced to the audience, Chaplin received a twelve-minute standing ovation, the longest in Academy Awards history.

=== Films with multiple wins and nominations ===
Films that received multiple nominations
Nominations	Film
8	Fiddler on the Roof
8	The French Connection
8	The Last Picture Show
6	Nicholas and Alexandra
5	Bedknobs and Broomsticks
5	Mary, Queen of Scots
4	A Clockwork Orange
4	Kotch
4	Summer of '42
4	Sunday Bloody Sunday
2	The Andromeda Strain
2	The Garden of the Finzi-Continis
2	The Hospital
2	Klute
2	Sentinels of Silence
2	Shaft
2	Sometimes a Great Notion
2	Tchaikovsky

Films that received multiple awards
Awards	Film
5	The French Connection
3	Fiddler on the Roof
2	The Last Picture Show
2	Nicholas and Alexandra
2	Sentinels of Silence

== Presenters and performers ==
=== Presenters (in order of appearance) ===
Name(s)	Role
Hank Simms	Announcer for the 44th Academy Awards
Daniel Taradash (AMPAS President)	Gave opening remarks welcoming guests to the awards ceremony
Ann-Margret; John Gavin	Presenters of the award for Best Cinematography
Karen Black; Richard Chamberlain	Presenters of the award for Best Special Visual Effects
Timothy Bottoms; Jennifer O'Neill	Presenters of the award for Best Art Direction
Red Buttons; Jill St. John	Presenters of the award for Best Film Editing
James Caan; Joey Heatherton	Presenters of the award for Best Documentary Feature and Best Documentary Short Subject
Frank Capra; Natalie Wood	Presenters of the award for Best Director
Leslie Caron; Jack Valenti	Presenters of the award for Best Foreign Language Film
Sandy Duncan; Michael York	Presenters of the award for Best Sound
Betty Grable; Dick Haymes	Presenters of the award for Best Original Score (Dramatic) and Best Score (Adaptation and Original Song)
Joel Grey	Presenter of the award for Best Original Song
Tennessee Williams	Presenter of the awards for Best Screenplay Based on Material from Another Medium and Best Screenplay Based on Factual Material or Material Not Previously Produced or Published
Gene Hackman; Raquel Welch	Presenters of the award for Best Supporting Actress
Richard Harris; Sally Kellerman	Presenters of the award for Best Supporting Actor
Cloris Leachman; Richard Roundtree	Presenters of the award for Best Animated Short Subject and Live Action Short Subject
Walter Matthau	Presenter of the award for Best Actress
Liza Minnelli	Presenter of the award for Best Actor
Joe Namath; Cybill Shepherd	Presenters of the award for Best Costume Design
Jack Nicholson	Presenter of the award for Best Picture
Daniel Taradash	Presenter of the Academy Honorary Award to Charlie Chaplin

=== Performers (in order of appearance) ===
Name(s)	Role	Performed
Henry Mancini	Musical arranger	Orchestral
Joel Grey	Performer	"Lights, Camera, Action!"
The Carpenters	Performer	"Bless the Beasts and Children"
Isaac Hayes	Performer	"Theme from Shaft"
Johnny Mathis	Performer	"Life Is What You Make It"
Charley Pride	Performer	"All His Children"
Debbie Reynolds	Performer	"The Age of Not Believing"
Academy Awards Chorus	Performers	"Smile"

== See also ==
- 29th Golden Globe Awards
- 1971 in film
- 14th Grammy Awards
- 23rd Primetime Emmy Awards
- 24th Primetime Emmy Awards
- 25th British Academy Film Awards
- 26th Tony Awards
