= A Step in the Right Direction =

"A Step in the Right Direction" is a song written by the Sherman Brothers for the 1971, Walt Disney musical film production Bedknobs and Broomsticks.

When a baby spider

tries to trap a fly
Often times, the silken thread
Will come awry
Though a tangled web is all that he can claim

It's a step in the right direction all the same

== Lost scene ==
Upon rediscovering the song on the original soundtrack album, Disney decided to reconstruct the original running length of Bedknobs and Broomsticks, with all the songs. Most of the film material was found, but one minute of another song, "Portobello Road", had to be reconstructed from a work print with digital re-coloration to match the film quality of the main content. The footage for "A Step in the Right Direction" was never located. For many decades, it remains lost, and it is possible that the footage was accidentally destroyed, but records show that the song was part of the film before the Radio City engagement. A reconstruction of the sequence, using the original music track linked up to existing production stills, was included as a DVD extra to convey an idea of what it would have looked like in the film.
