= Portobello Road (song) =

1971 song by the Sherman Brothers

"Portobello Road" by the Sherman Brothers is a song, specifically a waltz (3/4) about Portobello Road in London, England (set in the 1940s). It was written for the 1971, Walt Disney musical film production Bedknobs and Broomsticks. It is sung by David Tomlinson about a street where, to this day–

Anything and everything a chap can unload
Is sold off the barrow in Portobello Road

There is an extensive dance sequence where different groups from around the world dance to the song's theme played in various styles while 5 soldiers perform the same number on a trumpet, a saxophone, a trombone, a tuba and a drum kit.

The musical number set up is very similar to the "Consider Yourself" number from Oliver! in which butchers, policemen, carnival entertainers and fishmongers all dance in separate segments of the musical number.
