= The Beautiful Briny =

Song by David Tomlinson and Angela Lansbury

from the album Bedknobs and Broomsticks
- Released: October 7, 1971
- Genre: Film musical
- Length: 4:01
- Label: Walt Disney Records; Buena Vista Records
- Songwriter: Sherman Brothers
- Producer: Bill Walsh

"The Beautiful Briny" is a song written by the Sherman Brothers, originally for the Walt Disney film Mary Poppins, but eventually used instead in the 1971 musical film production Bedknobs and Broomsticks. David Tomlinson (Emelius Browne) and Angela Lansbury (Eglantine Price) perform the song as a duet under the water, in the lagoon of the Island of Naboombu.

== Thematic placement ==
With a moment to garner perspective "far from the frenzy of the frantic world above", Browne and Price dance to the music of a 1940s night club orchestra. The orchestra is made up of sea creatures. At one point in the song, possible romance is alluded to, but it is not specified as in addition to Miss Price and Mr. Browne, pairs of male and female animated sea creatures are shown dancing in the song while 3 fishes and an octopus perform the same number on a saxophone, a piano, a double bass and a drum kit.

Two beneath the blue
Could even fall in love...

== Other film connections ==
"Under the Sea" from the 1989 musical film The Little Mermaid (which won the Oscar for "Best Original Song" that year) was thematically inspired by "Beautiful Briny" as both songs are, more or less, about the same thing. In Mary Poppins Returns, the scene where Mary Poppins had the children bathe is a nod to this song and had characters from Bedknobs and Broomsticks. The song was written for the original 1964 Mary Poppins.

== Literary sources ==
- Sherman, Robert B. Walt's Time: from before to beyond. Santa Clarita: Camphor Tree Publishers, 1998.
