= Brian Hill (author) =

Canadian director and playwright

- Born: Kitchener, Ontario, Canada
- Occupations: Director, playwright
- Writing career
- Language: English
- Years active: 1993–present
- Notable works: Disney's Bedknobs and Broomsticks, The Story of My Life, revised book of Brigadoon, The Theory of Relativity
- Notable awards: 2009 Drama Desk Award nominee
- Website: BartramAndHill.com

Brian Hill is a Canadian/American director and playwright living in New York City.

Hill has directed new works, revised classics and developmental works for Disney Theatrical Productions, Mirvish Productions, 5th Avenue Theatre, Chicago Shakespeare Theater, Goodspeed Musicals, TheatreWorks, Segal Centre for Performing Arts, The Shaw Festival of Canada and The Stratford Festival of Canada. Hill was the original director of Come From Away and creator of the musical's foundational physical vocabulary.

He was resident director of the Toronto and Broadway companies of The Lion King and associate director of the Broadway production of The Little Mermaid.

As an actor he spent three seasons with the Shaw Festival, originated the role of Frankie (Dora Award for outstanding actor) in the original Canadian cast of Forever Plaid, played Raoul in The Phantom of the Opera and Joe in Sunset Boulevard.

== Written Works ==
- Bedknobs and Broomsticks with composer/lyricist Neil Bartram
- The Theory of Relativity with composer/lyricist Neil Bartram - commissioned by Sheridan College - written specifically for college age students - Goodspeed Musicals - directed by Brian Hill - licensed through Music Theatre International
- The Story of My Life with composer/lyricist Neil Bartram - directed by Richard Maltby Jr. - nominated for four Drama Desk Awards for outstanding musical, music, lyrics and book of a musical. - licensed through Music Theatre International
- Something Wicked This Way Comes with composer/lyricist Neil Bartram
- The Adventures of Pinocchio with composer/lyricist Neil Bartram - licensed through Concord Theatricals
- Brigadoon - revised book - Goodman Theatre - directed by Rachel Rockwell
- Spin with composer/lyricist Neil Bartram - Signature Theatre - directed by Eric Schaeffer
- October Sky - revised book - Old Globe Theatre - directed by Rachel Rockwell
- You Are Here with composer/lyricist Neil Bartram - Thousand Islands Playhouse, Goodspeed Musicals, Southwark Playhouse
- Senza Luce with composer/lyricist Neil Bartram - Sheridan College

== Directorial Works ==
- Tell Tale Harbour - Confederation Centre / Mirvish
- Damn Yankees - The Shaw Festival
- Mythic - The Segal Centre
- The Wizard of Oz - Chicago Shakespeare Theater
- The Theory of Relativity - Goodspeed Musicals
- Patience - Stratford Festival of Canada
- Come From Away (developmental productions)
- The Little Mermaid (Broadway) - Associate Director - Disney Theatrical
- The Lion King (Broadway) - Resident Director - Disney Theatrical
- The Lion King (Toronto) - Resident Director - Disney Theatrical / Mirvish
- Fiddler on the Roof - Associate Director - Stratford Festival
- Man of La Mancha - Associate Director - Stratford Festival
- Something Wicked This Way Comes - Penn State University
- The Light in the Piazza - University of Michigan
- Very Good, Eddie - NYU
- Irene - NYU
- Meet Me in St. Louis - NYU
- Seussical - NYU
- Saturday Night - NYU
- The Boy Friend - NYU
- Celebration - NYU
