= The Age of Not Believing =

Song by Angela Lansbury

from the album Bedknobs and Broomsticks
- Released: 1971
- Songwriter: Sherman Brothers

"The Age of Not Believing" is a song written by the Sherman Brothers for the 1971 Walt Disney musical film production Bedknobs and Broomsticks. Angela Lansbury sings the song in the motion picture. In the lyrics, Lansbury's character Eglantine expresses how as children grow up, they lose their belief in magic and doubt themselves. The song works on two levels, both on a personal, human level and thematically for the whole film - a Britain grown cynical from the pressures of war must learn to borrow from its own past magic in order to overcome the tremendous challenge which lies before it, while the characters in the film must finally learn to trust in Eglantine's magic to achieve their goals and save Britain from the Nazis.

The song earned the Sherman Brothers an Oscar nomination for Best Original Song (though it lost to Isaac Hayes's Theme from Shaft). They were also nominated for Best Original Score (John Williams's score for Fiddler on the Roof won instead). This represented the songwriters' fourth and fifth Oscar bids, respectively.

The song was covered by the band Dodgy in 1991 during a BBC Radio 1 session for Mark Goodier, and can be heard on the album So Far on 3 Wheels - Dodgy On The Radi, released in 2007.
