= Neil Bartram =

Canadian composer

- Born: Derby, United Kingdom
- Occupations: Composer & Lyricist
- Writing career
- Language: English
- Years active: 1993–present
- Notable works: music & lyrics for Disney's Bedknobs and Broomsticks, The Story of My Life (musical), The Theory of Relativity
- Notable awards: 2009 Drama Desk Award nominee
- Website: BartramAndHill.com

Neil Bartram is a musical theatre composer/lyricist based in New York. Bartram is the composer and lyricist of Disney's Bedknobs and Broomsticks, The Theory of Relativity and Broadway's The Story of My Life with book writer Brian Hill.

Awards include a Jeff Award nomination for his score for Shakespeare in Love at Chicago Shakespeare Theater, the ASCAP Foundation’s Yellen Award, a Jonathan Larson Foundation Award, a Dramatists Guild Fellowship and a Dora Award.

Music Theatre International licenses The Story of My Life and The Theory of Relativity. Concord Theatricals licenses The Adventures of Pinocchio. The Story of My Life and The Theory of Relativity cast albums were produced by PS Classics.

Bartram is a Dramatists Guild member, ASCAP member, and an alumnus of the BMI Lehman Engel Music Theatre Workshop. His work is published by Warner/Chappell Music.

== Works ==
- The Story of My Life with Brian Hill, directed by Richard Maltby Jr., starring Will Chase and Malcolm Gets
- The Adventures of Pinocchio with Hill, commissioned by Chicago Shakespeare Theater
- Something Wicked This Way Comes with Hill
- Belles Soeurs, Canadian National Tour
- The Theory of Relativity with Hill, Goodspeed Musicals
- Spin with Hill, Signature Theatre, directed by Eric Schaeffer.
- You Are Here with Hill, Thousand Islands Playhouse, Goodspeed Musicals, Southwark Playhouse
- Senza Luce with Hill, Sheridan College
- Shakespeare In Love, new score for Chicago Shakespeare Theater, directed by Rachel Rockwell
- Bedknobs and Broomsticks with Hill
