= Rachel Rockwell =

American theater director (1969–2018)

- Born: Natalie Rachel Heyde; July 14, 1969; Columbia, Missouri, U.S.
- Died: May 28, 2018 (aged 48)
- Occupations: Theatre director, choreographer, dancer
- Years active: 1991–2018
- Spouse: Garth Helm
- Children: 1
- Father: Austin Gary
- Relatives: Jeremy Spencer (brother)

Rachel Rockwell (born Natalie Rachel Heyde; July 14, 1969 – May 28, 2018) was an American theater director, choreographer and performer.

== Early life ==
Rockwell was born Natalie Rachel Heyde in Columbia, Missouri, the daughter of songwriter/teacher Gary Heyde (Austin Gary) and actress/teacher Glory (Kissel) Heyde. Her brother is Jeremy Spencer (Heyde), the former drummer of heavy metal band Five Finger Death Punch.

Beginning at seven, she studied dance with Ricki Smith Newman, Sylvia Watters and Evansville Dance Theater in Evansville, Indiana. At 13, she won a scholarship to study ballet at the National Academy of Arts in Champaign, Illinois. In 1993, while at University of Southern Indiana, she directed her first musical, Tintypes, at the New Harmony Theater in New Harmony, Indiana. After college, she moved to Chicago.

== Career ==
Beginning in the mid-1990s, Rockwell directed and choreographed dozens of productions for such theaters as: Steppenwolf, Chicago Shakespeare Theatre, Drury Lane Theatre Oakbrook, Marriott Theatre Lincolnshire, Paramount Theatre, Noble Fool Theatricals, Fox Valley Repertory, Apple Tree, The Little Theatre on the Square, SIU Summer Theatre and McCleod Summer Playhouse.

She appeared on Broadway in Mamma Mia! and the national tours of Mamma Mia! and Harold Prince's Show Boat.

A triple-threat performer, Rockwell was nominated for a Joseph Jefferson Award for Best Actress in a review (And The World Goes 'Round) (2001); and Best Supporting Actress in a musical for The Pajama Game (2004).

As a choreographer, she was nominated for Joseph Jefferson Awards for The King & I (2007) and A Chorus Line (2011). As a director, she received Jeff Award nominations for Miss Saigon (2009); The 25th Annual Putnam County Spelling Bee—Best Musical (2009); Ragtime (2010) and 42nd Street (2011). For her acclaimed Drury Lane Oakbrook Theatre production of Ragtime (11 Jeff nominations and seven awards), she received the Joseph Jefferson Award as Best Director of a musical. As Director, Jeff Award nominations (2012) for Best Director and Best Musical: The Sound of Music and Sweeney Todd at Drury Lane Oakbrook Theatre; and Best Play: Enron at Timeline Theatre Company.

In 2010, she was named "Best Director" by Chicago Magazine.

In 2013, her production of Oliver! received a Jeff nomination for Best Musical. In 2014, she received Jeff Award nominations (Director, Choreography and Best Musical) for the revival of Brigadoon at The Goodman Theatre and Les Misérables at Drury Lane Oakbrook. Her production of Brigadoon was named Best Musical and she was named Best Choreographer for that production. She won the Jeff Award for Best Choreography for her production of Billy Eliot in 2015. In 2016, she won the Jeff Award as Best Director for her production of Ride the Cyclone at Chicago Shakespeare Theatre.

In July 2014, Goodman Theatre produced the first major revival of Brigadoon in two decades—directed and choreographed by Rockwell, who, with Brian Hill, updated the book, with permission from the Lerner and Loewe estates. Her productions of Ride the Cyclone and Billy Eliot were named two of the Top Ten productions in Chicago for 2015. Her U.S. premiere Chicago Shakespeare Theatre production of Ride the Cyclone was then produced off-Broadway at MCC Theater, and named Best of 2016 by the New York Times. She directed the World Premiere of Diary of a Wimpy Kid at Minneapolis Children's Theatre in April 2016.

In 2017, Rockwell's production of Ride the Cyclone at MCC Theater received five Lucille Lortel Award nominations and a Drama League nomination.

She directed notable Children's Theatre productions at Chicago Shakespeare Theater (CST)—including the premieres of The Emperor's New Clothes (2010); The Adventures of Pinocchio (2011); (Director & Adapter) Short Shakespeare! The Taming of the Shrew (2012)—and Disney's Beauty & The Beast (2012) and Shrek (2013). At CST, she also choreographed productions of The Merry Wives of Windsor, Romeo and Juliet, and Measure For Measure. At Timeline Theatre Company, she directed the regional premiere of Enron (2012).

== Personal life and death ==
She was married to Broadway sound designer Garth Helm. They have a son.

Rockwell died on May 28, 2018, of ovarian cancer.
