= Erik Blegvad =

British illustrator (1923–2014)

- Born: 3 March 1923; Copenhagen, Denmark
- Died: 14 January 2014 (aged 90)
- Occupation: Illustrator

Erik Blegvad (Danish pronunciation: [ˈplɑjˌvɛːð]; 3 March 1923 – 14 January 2014) was a Danish born illustrator of more than a hundred books, including The Winter Bear, The Borrowers, and the 1957 omnibus Bedknob and Broomstick. He died in London at the age of 90.

Blegvad was born in Copenhagen, Denmark, and studied at the Copenhagen School of Arts and Crafts. After this he moved to Paris, France to work as a commercial illustrator. There he met his future wife, the American, Lenore Hochman. After their marriage in 1950, they moved to the US, settling in South Wardsboro, VT.

In 1966, they moved to London and Erik spent the rest of his life travelling between the two countries.

Leone and Erik are parents to comedian and musician, Peter Blegvad (b. 1951).

She passed away in 2008 and Erik in 2014, in London.
