= The Shaggy Dog (franchise) =

American media franchise

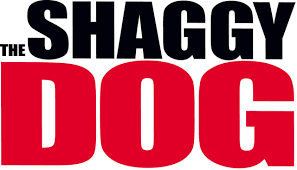
- Logo of 2006 film
- Based on: The Hound of Florence: A Novel by Felix Salten
- Starring: Various actors (See list below)
- Distributed by: The Walt Disney Company
- Country: United States
- Language: English
- Budget: >$60,125,000 (total of 2 films)
- Box office: >$106,634,280 (total of 3 films) (Note: These figures are based on the available numbers for the theatrical films. Though there are a total five movies, there is no financial information publicly available for the made-for-television films.)

The Shaggy Dog franchise consists of American science fiction-fantasy-comedy films, with three theatrical releases, and two made-for-television films. The overall story is based on the 1923 novel titled The Hound of Florence by Felix Salten. The overarching story of each installment, follows Wilbur "Wilby" Daniels (portrayed by varying actors in each individual film) who is cursed and transforms into a large Old English Sheepdog after attaining an ancient Borgian ring and reciting its inscription.

A reimagined-live-action remake was released in 2006, with Tim Allen in the starring role. Though the overall concept was similar, many aspects of the previous films were changed, and thus has more in common with a reboot. The main character David Douglas becomes a Bearded Collie, after being bitten by a 'sacred dog'. The film genre takes on a slapstick comedy style.

The films were met with mixed to positive critical reception, while the television remake was met with poor reception. Additionally, the second remake was met with predominantly poor box office and critical reception. It made less in box office returns, than its budget. In 1999 the Shaggy Dog films, along with a number of other Disney film series, were expanded as a Walt Disney Parks franchise through a theme park attraction, with elements included from each film.

== Origin ==
The 1923 Austrian fantasy children's novel by Felix Salten, set during the early eighteenth-century Austria and Italy, served as the inspiration for The Walt Disney Company's Shaggy Dog franchise. The story follows the teenage main character, Lukas Grassi. Grassi lost his parents and lives in Vienna, Austria, in poor conditions, and great poverty, but longs to return to his native land Italy, having desires to study art in Florence. Through supernatural means his wish is magically granted, he must endure taking the form of the archduke's dog, named Kambyses, every-other-day. Grassi travels from Vienna to Florence, and learns that he must continue to live this duality he is cursed to until the archduke will leave Florence for Vienna. However, ending in tragedy, the archduke stabs the dog to death with a dagger, inadvertently killing Lukas.

The novel was first translated into the English language in 1930 by Huntley Paterson. The ending of the book in this iteration differs greatly from the original release. Following the events of the original novel, a wholly new ending of six additional pages was written where Lucas survives, receives medication, and is united with a courtesan.

== Development ==
Walt Disney originally purchased the film rights to Salten's novel Bambi, a Life in the Woods in 1937. In May 1941, Disney purchased the rights to five more of the author's novels, which included options to Salten to adapt them. The novels were Bambi sequels: Bambi's Children and Perri: The Youth of a Squirrel, as well as Renni the Rescuer: A Dog of the Battlefield, City Jungle and The Hound of Florence. Salten did not want to make Bambi's Children, and didn't want anyone else to make it either. He did however intend to for the other books to be adapted into animated films. Before these additional films could be made, Salten died in Zurich in 1945.

By 1952, ABC wanted Walt Disney to develop a television series for the network. He pitched them The Shaggy Dog, a concept he described as "a story that treated the younger generation and its problems in a light manner". After the pitch was declined, Disney stated: "They turned me down flat. I was hopping mad when I went back to the studio, so I called in Bill Walsh and said 'Let's make a feature of it.'" The film's star, Tommy Kirk later acknowledged that the film was originally shot to be a two-part introduction to the television show, stating that the segments were spliced together at the last minute to make a feature film.

Upon its release, The Shaggy Dog was the most profitable film at that time produced by Disney. This spawned the continued adaptations and installments in the franchise.

== Films ==
=== Theatrical ===
Film	U.S. release date	Director	Screenwriter(s)	Producer(s)
The Shaggy Dog	March 19, 1959	Charles Barton	Bill Walsh & Lillie Hayward	Walt Disney and Bill Walsh
The Shaggy D.A.	December 17, 1976	Robert Stevenson	Don Tait	Bill Anderson
The Shaggy Dog	March 10, 2006	Brian Robbins	Carmac Wibberley & Marianne Wibberley and Geoff Rodkey and Jack Amiel & Michael Begler	David Hoberman and Tim Allen

==== The Shaggy Dog (1959) ====
Wilby Daniels, the son of a dog-hating former-mailman named Wilson, accidentally becomes a canine himself when he acquires an ancient Borgian ring and receives its curse. Inadvertently invoking a magical spell engraved upon the centuries-old jewelry, Wilby begins turning into an Old English sheepdog at unpredictable times. Managing his transformations and his personal life becomes more complicated when he overhears a plot to steal secret government information while in dog-form. Wilby sets out on an unexpected adventure, in attempts to stop the criminals from succeeding.

==== The Shaggy D.A. (1976) ====
Years after the first film, Wilby Daniels is now a successful lawyer. After returning from vacation only to find his house has been ransacked by burglars, he decides to rid the town of crime by running for district attorney against the corrupt John Slade in the upcoming election. Just as Wilby begins his campaign, he learns that the Borgian ring that has the power to turn him into a large old English sheepdog has been stolen from a museum. Realizing that the precious jewel and its curse are once again transforming him into a sheepdog at the most inconvenient times, Wilby continues his campaign for D.A. with a greater determination to win the election, regardless.

==== The Shaggy Dog (2006) ====
A modern-day adaptation of the film series, The Shaggy Dog (2006) includes elements from the two previous theatrical films.

Deputy District Attorney Dave Douglas is a workaholic, and often places his job responsibilities before his family. After accepting a court case which involves an animal laboratory, he gets bit by a sheepdog. The infection, with a top-secret serum, begins a cycle of transforming Douglas into a Bearded Collie dog. His time as a canine begins to give Dave a new perspective on the importance of his time with his family. He realizes that but before he can make things right with his wife and kids, he must find evidence and prove that those individuals responsible for the concoction that causes his affliction are criminals.

=== Television ===
Film	U.S. release date	Director	Screenwriters	Producer
The Return of the Shaggy Dog	November 1, 1987	Stuart Gillard	Paul Haggis & Diane Wilk	Harvey Marks
The Shaggy Dog	November 12, 1994	Dennis Dugan	Bill Walsh & Lillie Hayward and Tim Doyle	Joseph B. Wallenstein

During the late 1980s, a sequel to The Shaggy Dog and prequel to The Shaggy D.A. was released exclusively through television broadcast. The film's events take place during the seventeen years between the two stories, and was deemed a success. After this production, The Walt Disney Company continued this trend through the remainder of the '80s and early-'90s, with a number of made-for-television remake films of classic Walt Disney Productions. Produced and released as a part of The Magical World of Disney series, among them, was a television remake of The Shaggy Dog.

==== The Return of the Shaggy Dog (1987) ====
Wilby Daniels, now a successful lawyer, is engaged to his girlfriend Betty. A dying Professor Plumcutt bequeaths the ancient Borgian ring to Daniels, only for the professor's evil caretakers to plot a heist in attaining the inherited item for their own nefarious plans. After Wilby attains the ring, the curse that transforms him into a sheepdog is reactivated in the process of foiling the criminals' plans. With the help of his younger brother "Moochie", Wilby sets out to find a way of once again breaking the curse, while assisting his Moochie – an upcoming casting director – in creating the perfect commercial for dogs. The pair seek to stop the henchman, in addition to once again breaking the curse before Wilby and Betty's imminent wedding day.

==== The Shaggy Dog (1994) ====
Wilby is a 16-year-old who loves studying science, but can never seem to catch the attention of the girls at school. He learns from his father that the House of Borgia used magic in ancient times to conjure up love, only to unintentionally gain possession of an ancient Borgia ring. Wilby decides to see if improves his love life, and to instead be turned into an Old English Sheepdog. He sets off on a series of comedic adventures, seeking to break the curse.

== Main cast and characters ==
List indicators

This section includes characters who will appear or have appeared in the franchise in main roles.

- An empty grey cell indicates the character was not in the film, or that the character's official presence has not yet been confirmed.
- ^{V} indicates a voice-only role.

Character
Character	Theatrical films			Television	
Character	The Shaggy Dog	The Shaggy D.A.	The Shaggy Dog	The Return of the Shaggy Dog	The Shaggy Dog
Wilbur "Wilby" Daniels The Shaggy Dog	Tommy Kirk Sam	Dean Jones Brutus		Gary Kroeger Uncredited dog, Michael Robinson^{V}	Scott Weinger Uncredited dog
Montgomery "Moochie" Daniels	Kevin Corcoran			Todd Waring	Jordan Warkol
Betty Daniels		Michele Little		Suzanne Pleshette	
Brian Daniels		Shane Sinutko			
Wilson Daniels	Fred MacMurray				
Museum Curator, Professor Plumcutt	Cecil Kellaway				Jack Ammon
Francesca Andrassy	Roberta Shore				
Dr. Mikhail Valasky	Alexander Scourby				
Tim		Tim Conway			
Katrinka Muggelberg		Jo Anne Worley			
District Attorney John Slade		Keenan Wynn			
Edward "Fast Eddie" Roshak		Vic Tayback			
Freddie		Dick Bakalyan			
Dip		Warren Berlinger			
Museum Curator, Professor Whatley		Warren Berlinger			
Raymond		Dick Van Patten			
the Pound various dogs		George Kirby^{V}			
David "Dave" Douglas			Tim Allen Cole		
Rebecca Douglas			Kristin Davis		
Carly Douglas			Zena Grey		
Josh Douglas			Spencer Breslin		
Dr. Kozak			Robert Downey, Jr.		
Myra				Jane Carr	
Carl				Gavin Reed	
Charlier "the Robber" Mulvihill					James Cromwell

== Additional crew and production details ==
Film	Crew/Detail					
Film	Composer(s)	Cinematographer	Editor(s)	Production companies	Distributing companies	Running time
The Shaggy Dog	Paul J. Smith	Edward Colman	James Ballas	Walt Disney Productions	Buena Vistas Distribution Company	1hr 44mins
The Shaggy D.A.	Paul J. Smith & Buddy Baker	Frank V. Phillips	Bob Bring & Norman R. Palmer	Walt Disney Productions	Buena Vistas Distribution Company	1hr 31mins
The Return of the Shaggy Dog	David Bell	Fred J. Koenekamp	Michael F. Anderson, Dennis C. Duckwall & Jack Harnish	Walt Disney Television	American Broadcasting Company	1hr 40mins
The Shaggy Dog	Denis M. Hannigan	Russ T. Alsobrook	Jeff Gourson	Walt Disney Television, ZM Productions	American Broadcasting Company, Buena Vista Television, Disney–ABC Domestic Television	1hr 36mins
The Shaggy Dog	Alan Menken	Gabriel Beristain	Ned Bastille	Walt Disney Pictures, Mandeville Films, Boxing Cat Films, Shaggy Dog Productions	Buena Vista Pictures	1hr 39mins

== Reception ==
=== Box office and financial performance ===
Film	Box office gross			Box office ranking		Budget	Worldwide Total income	Ref.
Film	North America	Other territories	Worldwide	All time North America	All time worldwide	Budget	Worldwide Total income	Ref.
The Shaggy Dog (1959)	not available	not available	$9,000,000	#2,844	#3,952	$1,250,000	$56,750,000	
The Shaggy D.A.	not available	not available	$10,500,000	not available	not available	not available	≈$10,500,000	
The Return of the Shaggy Dog	—N/a	—N/a	—N/a	—N/a	—N/a	not available	—N/a	
The Shaggy Dog (1994)	—N/a	—N/a	—N/a	—N/a	—N/a	not available	—N/a	
The Shaggy Dog (2006)	$61,123,569	$26,010,711	$87,134,280	#1,365	#2,610	$60,000,000	$27,134,280	
Totals	≙$61,123,569	≙$26,010,711	≌$106,634,280	~x̄ #1,403 (Note: This is an approximate average, based on the all-time standing of each theatrically released film.)	~x̄ #1,404 (Note: This is an approximate average, based on the all-time foreign standing of each theatrically released film.)	~$60,125,000	≌$94,384,280	

=== Critical and public response ===
Film	Rotten Tomatoes	Metacritic
The Shaggy Dog (1959)	67% (18 reviews)	45/100 (6 reviews)
The Shaggy D.A.	50% (8 reviews)	60/100 (6 reviews)
The Return of the Shaggy Dog	—N/a	—N/a
The Shaggy Dog (1994)	—N/a	—N/a
The Shaggy Dog (2006)	26% (103 reviews)	43/100 (25 reviews)

== Theme park attraction ==
In 1999, the theme of Journey into Imagination was changed and re-titled to include Figment. The ride features Dr. Nigel Channing, from Honey, I Shrunk the Audience!, who "hosts" an area known as the Imagination Institute. The story states that Channing's grandfather established the institute, while the area features references to Dean Higgins (Head of the Medfield College, where the events of The Shaggy D.A. transpire) from the Dexter Riley films, Wayne Szalinski from the Honey, I Shrunk the Kids franchise, as well as Dr. Philip Brainard from Flubber. Walt Disney and Thomas Edison also make an appearance.

== Related films ==
The Medfield College appears in The Shaggy D.A. as a primary location. The fictional college appears in two other Disney film franchises, including both the Flubber and the Dexter Riley film series. Collectively, the three separate film series take place within the same fictional universe. Additionally, the Merlin Jones film series take place at the in-universe sister-school, Midvale College, while The World's Greatest Athlete is set at the related academic school of Merrivale College.

Film	U.S. release date	Director(s)	Screenwriter(s)	Story by	Producer(s)
Flubber film series
The Absent-Minded Professor	March 16, 1961	Robert Stevenson	Bill Walsh	Bill Walsh	Bill Walsh
Son of Flubber	January 16, 1963	Robert Stevenson	Bill Walsh & Don DaGradi	Bill Walsh & Don DaGradi	Walt Disney and Bill Walsh
Flubber	November 26, 1997	Les Mayfield	John Hughes	John Hughes	John Hughes and Ricardo Mestres
Merlin Jones film series
The Missadventures of Merlin Jones	February 11, 1964	Robert Stevenson	Tom August & Helen August	Bill Walsh	Walt Disney and Ron Miller
The Monkey's Uncle	August 18, 1965	Robert Stevenson	Tom August & Helen August	Tom August & Helen August	Walt Disney and Ron Miller
Dexter Riley film series
The Computer Wore Tennis Shoes	December 31, 1969	Robert Butler	Joseph L. McEveety	Joseph L. McEveety	Bill Anderson
Now You See Him, Now You Don't	July 12, 1972	Robert Butler	Joseph L. McEveety	Robert L. King	Ron Miller
The Strongest Man in the World	February 6, 1975	Vincent McEveety	Joseph L. McEveety & Herman Groves	Joseph L. McEveety & Herman Groves	Bill Anderson
Other films
The World's Greatest Athlete	February 1, 1973	Robert Scheerer	Dee Caruso and Gerald Gardner	Dee Caruso and Gerald Gardner	Bill Walsh
