= Florian: The Emperor's Stallion =

1933 novel by Felix Salten

- First American edition
- Author: Felix Salten
- Original title: Florian: Das Pferd des Kaisers
- Translator: Erich Posselt and Michel Kraike (US); Norman Gullick (UK)
- Illustrator: Philipp Arlen (Swiss)
- Language: German
- Genre: novel
- Set in: Vienna
- Publisher: Paul Zsolnay Verlag
- Publication date: 1933
- Publication place: Austria
- English publication date: 1934
- Pages: 330 (Austrian); 204 (Swiss); 343 (US); 287 (UK)
- OCLC: 797472098

Florian: The Emperor's Stallion (German: Florian: Das Pferd des Kaisers), also published as Florian: An Emperor's Horse and Florian the Lipizzaner, is a 1933 novel by the Austrian writer Felix Salten, made in 1940 to the film Florian. The novel tells the story of a Lipizzan horse during and after the decline of the Habsburg monarchy in Vienna, circa 1901–1930.

== Plot ==
The storyline of Florian can be divided in four sections. First, the childhood of Florian in Lipizza (currently Lipica, Slovenia) is depicted. Second, the story follows Florian in the Spanish Riding School where he performs with great excellence to aristocrats and monarchs, becoming a leading horse and a favourite of the emperor Francis Joseph. The third section – after a short episode back in the Lipizza Stud Farm where Florian sires offspring – presents Florian's career in the Imperial Mews of Vienna where Florian and his mates pull the emperor's coach. Finally, after the outbreak of World War I and death of the emperor, Florian becomes unemployed, is auctioned, abused by a city coachman, and sold as useless. During the whole novel, the fate of the horse is set against a historical background – the dying Habsburg empire.

== Characters ==
As in two other animal novels of Salten, Renni the Rescuer and Djibi, the Kitten, also in Florian the protagonist is an animal, surrounded by other animals and people, and the story covers several years, not a single year, as in Fifteen Rabbits, for instance.

Florian is born in Lipizza on St. Florian's day, 4 May 1901. From early on, he is taken care of by a simple stable-boy Anton Pointner, who later follows Florian to Vienna, the Spanish Riding School, because the horse is depressed when separated from his familiar caretaker. The third central character is a fox terrier called Bosco who has a deep co-dependent relationship with the horse. The animals are seen somewhat anthropomorphic in this novel: the narrator imagines what the animals might be thinking or saying, and the humans treat the animals almost like persons, that is, with respect and love.

Numerous fictitious characters and historical figures are included in the subsidiary personal gallery of the novel. These include Captain von Neustift, his wife Elisabeth, the riding master Ennsbauer, the State coachman Konrad Gruber, as well as the emperor Francis Joseph and the archduke Franz Ferdinand.

The characters of the riding master Ennsbauer and his mistress, the stage diva Gabriele Menzinger were modelled after the real riding master Johann Meixner (1865–1917) and the actress Helene Odilon (1863–1939).

According to Salten's biographer Beverley Driver Eddy, "the portrayals of royalty are as compelling as those of the animals". As a journalist, Salten was famous for his sketches, portrayals and obituaries of celebrities, which were also collected in books: Buch der Könige (1905) and Das österreichische Antlitz (1909). In Florian, the text sometimes turns into "a history lecture" about the Heir Apparent, Franz Ferdinand, who receives special attention: he is shown coarse and impatient to ascend to the throne, and the antagonism between him and the emperor is illustrated in detail. Also the visiting monarchs Edward VII of England and Nicholas II of Russia are depicted in a lively way.

== Variety of versions ==
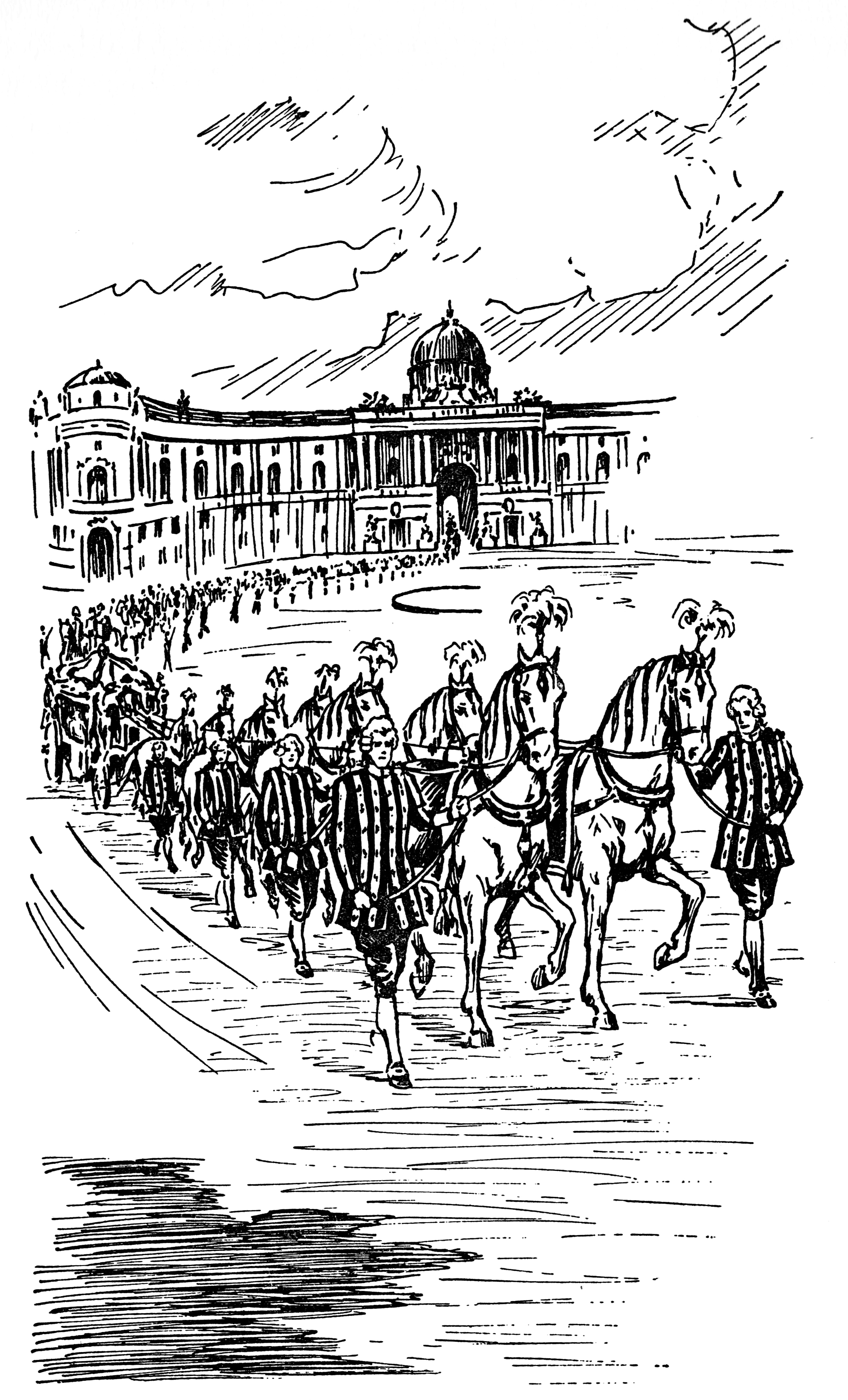
An illustration by Philipp Arlen for the 1942 abridged edition depicts the Feast of Corpus Christi procession in Vienna, allegedly 22 May 1913, with Florian as the leading horse.

Florian was first published in German language by Paul Zsolnay Verlag in 1933 and quickly went into second printing.

After Salten was forced to exile to Switzerland in 1939, his new publisher put out new editions of his work with novel illustrations, and Florian was released there in 1942 with illustrations by Philipp Arlen (1876–1944). This edition, however, is heavily abridged. The text is not rewritten, but sections of the text and certain episodes are left out, like Bosco's amorous escapades with the bitch Prittie and the disastrous visit of Nicholas II to Vienna. The novel was abridged also earlier, in 1937, Holland, by Adam van der Woude for the series Neue deutsche Bibliothek.

The unabridged German-language text of Florian has not been available in print since the 1930s. Some translations made after 1939 use the abridged text of Florian with Arlen's drawings, including the French one and the Dutch one. The Finnish translation from 2021 presents the full text with Arlen's illustrations, and hence this edition consists of both illustrated and unillustrated sequences.

Florian was translated into English in 1934 both in the United States (Florian: The Emperor's Stallion) and in the United Kingdom (Florian: An Emperor's Horse). Both editions reproduce the complete text with slight modifications, and both are unillustrated. The American edition has chapter numbering added to the novel; the British edition has the paragraph division altered and there are small omissions in the text.

The following sample shows how differently the translators have interpreted a short excerpt:

American edition	British edition
Once when they trotted back to Ischl from an evening's hunt they came, in the deep dusk of the forest, directly upon a stag. The light from the carriage lanterns flickered over his ruddy skin and crown of antlers. Then he bounded into the thicket and disappeared. With a quickened play of their ears and surprised eyes the two horses had spied the shadowy figure. Florian wanted to ask Capitano: "Do you know who that is?" But Capitano asked the very question first. Before they could puzzle out an answer the whole intermezzo was over. Whether they drove to the Hotel Elisabeth, over to the villa of the Emperor's daughter, Gisela, or elsewhere, Florian enjoyed this furlough from the strained going between high stone walls on paved streets. He enjoyed the quaint abiding charm of this village set like a jewel in the midst of forests and mountains. His enjoyment, of course, was not the product of his brain; he simply showed his gratitude for the freer form of existence in the more intense exhilaration of his being.	Once when they were returning to Ischl from an evening's deer-stalking a bear was standing in the middle of the dark forest road. The carriage lamps shone uncertainly on its reddish skin, its ruffle and head. The two horses twitched their ears anxiously and gazed with astonishment at the shadowy apparition. But as they came nearer it sprang aside into the thicket and disappeared. Florian was about to ask Capitano whether he knew what it was, but Capitano forestalled him with the same question, and by that time the thing had vanished. No matter where the carriage went, to the Hotel Elizabeth, to the villa of the Emperor's daughter Gisela, Florian enjoyed the refreshing experience of not having to move on hard-paved streets with high buildings on each side. He felt the charm of this resort, little more than a village, amid the forests and the mountains. Naturally he did not stop to consider why the place appealed to him so strongly, but his increasing high spirits were directly due to the freer life which he was now leading.

== Reception ==
In Neues Wiener Tagblatt, the novel was praised as "a passionate creed to Austria", and the reviewer of Neues Wiener Journal characterized it as not only a novel of "a horse, of a small dog, of a stable hand, but at the same time also a novel of the Old Austria". As for the American edition, Saturday Review of Literature wrote in 1934 that Florian is "a revelation, comparable to the revelation of 'Nijinsky' to those who thought the ballet a triviality". According to Eddy, "Florian is Salten's most perfect blending of animal and human existences".

== Selected editions ==
- Florian: Das Pferd des Kaisers. Roman. Wien: Paul Zsolnay Verlag. 1933.
- Florian: The Emperor's Stallion. Translated by Erich Posselt and Michel Kraike. Indianapolis: The Bobbs-Merrill Company. 1934.
- Florian: An Emperor's Horse. Translated from the German by Norman Gullick. London: Jonathan Cape. 1934.
- Florian: Das Pferd des Kaisers. Mit 106 Federzeichnungen von Philipp Arlen (Abridged ed.). Rüschlikon–Zürich: Albert Müller Verlag. 1942.
- Florian: Le cheval de l'empereur (in French). Traduction de Monique Yersin. Avec 106 dessins à la plume de Philippe Arlen (Abridged ed.). Neuchâtel–Paris: Delachaux & Niestlé. 1946.
- Florian the Lipizzaner. Translated from the German by Norman Gullick. London: J. A. Allen & Co. 1963.
- Florian: The Emperor's Stallion. Translated by Erich Posselt and Michel Kraike. New York: Aladdin. 2015. ISBN 978-1-4424-8758-1.

== Film adaptation ==
An MGM film was made in 1940: Florian, starring Robert Young, Helen Gilbert and Charles Coburn.
