= Fünf Minuten Amerika =

1931 travel book by Felix Salten

- Author: Felix Salten
- Cover artist: Rudolf Geyer
- Language: German
- Subject: U.S.A.
- Genre: travel literature
- Published: 1931
- Publisher: Paul Zsolnay Verlag
- Publication place: Austria
- Pages: 256
- Dewey Decimal: 917.3
- LC Class: E169 .S19

Fünf Minuten Amerika (German: “America in five minutes”) is a 1931 travel book by the Austrian writer Felix Salten, depicting his tour of 1930 in the United States of America. This was his second travel book, following his account of Palestine, Neue Menschen auf alter Erde, of 1925. Salten considered them his two books worthy of special mention.

In order to promote international understanding, the Carnegie Endowment for International Peace organized exchanges of visits of journalist groups between the United States and other countries. In 1930, a delegation of fourteen journalists from Central and Northern Europe were invited to the U.S., among them Felix Salten who represented the Austrian newspaper Neue Freie Presse. The guests visited different parts of the U.S., met with citizens and dignitaries, including the President of the U.S. and Henry Ford, and saw American nature.

The journalists arrived at New York City on 18 May 1930, and travelled via several cities, usually by train, including Washington, Atlanta, New Orleans, Los Angeles, San Francisco, Denver, Chicago, and Buffalo. From New York, they sailed back to Europe on 17 July 1930.

Salten reported his tour in a series of feuilletons for Neue Freie Presse starting 8 June 1930. These feuilletons (nineteen of them) were then compiled into a book Fünf Minuten Amerika and published by Paul Zsolnay Verlag the next year, 1931.

In his book, Salten provides subjective observations of American society and nature, and the main emphasis is on his personal impressions and opinions. He conversed with movie stars, society women, farmers, and fellow writers like Upton Sinclair. In his commentary, Salten is both admiring and critical. For instance, he adores natural monuments like the Grand Canyon and Yosemite National Park but also deplores the waste of natural resources, deforestation that has caused erosion, and the excess of automobiles. Often his tone is ironic when he describes everyday phenomena like advertising or large movie theaters for his European readers. Sometimes he illustrates the sceneries by comparing them to those of Europe, so that his Austrian readers could grasp them.

Even earlier, Salten had been fascinated with technical innovations, like the radio, and the American efficiency. He visited Ford’s factory in Detroit and a slaughterhouse in Omaha and describes the mechanical killing of animals and recycling of used cars which proceeds on a conveyor belt, feeling both fascination and abhorrence.

When it comes to prohibition of alcohol, Salten is very critical, even horrified of the young boozer girls. He saw that prohibition laws merely encourage people to drink because they wish to maintain their self-respect by defying a law that restricts private life. Similarly he criticizes the puritan laws against fornication which give rise to a double standard of morality.

On several occasions, Salten also discusses the situation of the Black Americans. He deplores the racial segregation that he saw in Alexandria, Virginia and in Atlanta. Salten did have difficulties in identifying himself with the black race and he used old racial terminology of his era but he struggles to maintain an open mind. He called it America’s “original sin” that “Negroes” were deprived of equality despite their labour and cultural achievements. Similarly, he laments the Native Americans who were reduced to tourist attractions.

Currently, Fünf Minuten Amerika has only been translated into Romanian in 1941 and into Finnish in 2016, the latter with notes and photographs appendix.

Salten was not the only journalist to write a book about the 1930 tour. The Finnish journalist and diplomat Urho Toivola (1890–1960) published his account in 1932: Aurinkoista Amerikkaa. As Toivola testifies, Salten was greeted warmly wherever the delegation went because of the popularity of Bambi, published in the United States in 1928.
