= Djibi, the Kitten =

1945 novel by Felix Salten

- First Swiss edition.
- Author: Felix Salten
- Original title: Djibi das Kätzchen
- Translator: Raya Levin
- Illustrator: Walter Linsenmaier
- Language: German
- Genre: novel
- Publisher: Albert Müller
- Publication date: 1945
- Publication place: Switzerland
- English publication date: 1946
- Pages: 113

Djibi, the Kitten (German: Djibi das Kätzchen) is the last novel of Felix Salten, published originally in 1945 and translated into English in 1946. Similarly as in other Salten's late books, the protagonist is an animal, this time a young female cat called Djibi.

In Renni the Rescuer, the main animal character had been a loyal servant to humans, but Djibi is an independent cat who chooses for herself where to live. The novel begins dramatically with a drowning attempt which the young kitten survives. A boy rescues her from the river and takes to his home where a dog adopts her and feeds along with other puppies. But when the boy rebuffs the cat, she leaves the farm immediately and, for a while, lives in the forest and kills pheasants. After being wounded by a gamekeeper, she decides to take shelter with humans again, and a kind teacher, Salten's alter ego, adopts her. After that, Djibi lives with the teacher and his wife, but her strong hunting instinct finally leads Djibi to her demise.

The main theme of the book are the reciprocal interactions between men and animals, especially cats and dogs. Unlike in Salten's earlier animal novels, for instance Bambi's Children, there isn't much anthropomorphism in Djibi — there is only one short dialogue between Djibi and a marten. The human characters, in contrast to the animals in the book, mostly have no personal names, but are referred to as "the teacher", "the farmer", etc.

The first English translation of Djibi by Raya Levin appeared in the United Kingdom in 1946, illustrated by Walter Linsenmaier as the original Swiss edition, but there is also an anonymous American translation, Jibby the Cat, illustrated by Fritz Kredel, which was published in 1948 by Julian Messner in New York City. This edition differs greatly from Salten's original text. Not only has it a happy ending — Djibi's death is left out — but it also has a happy opening added to it: the novel begins with five pages depicting Djibi's (or Jibby's) sweet life before the attempt on her life. The novel has been largely rewritten, and new incidents have been added to the story. For instance, in the Swiss and the British edition, the boy takes the kitten from the river directly to his home, but in the American edition, he first takes it to the teacher (or "schoolmaster Victor" in this edition). The Americal edition also adds chapter numbers and chapter titles to the book, and most human characters have personal names.

For example, the episode where Djibi decides to leave the farm is very different in the two English-language editions. The British edition follows very closely Salten's original German-language text, but the American edition has it rewritten:

British edition	American edition
The boy ran howling out of the stable. But because he was hungry, he ran into the kitchen. There a decisive scene took place between him and Djibi. Djibi meant no harm when she hastened to meet him and tried to jump on his shoulder as usual. But the boy pushed her back: "Leave me alone!" Djibi made a second attempt at re-establishing their long-standing intimacy. At the first sign of her intention, however, the boy cried: "Leave me alone, you damned beast!" At the same time he slapped the cat's head with impatient indignation. A slap? Djibi never accepted a slap without retaliation, never! As quick as lightning, her sharp claws dug into the boy's hand, from which a few drops of blood began to trickle. He staggered back in pain, while the cat, spitting, sat up on her hind legs and raised her paws in readiness for both defence and attack. The boy did not remember that he had pulled Djibi out of the water and saved her poor little life; he did not remember how often she had amused and delighted him. At the moment she appeared to him as a wild, excited enemy, and he was her exasperated, badly scratched opponent. It never occurred to him that he was responsible for this sudden transformation. Embittered, he reached out for the cat, to throw her against the wall, to punish her. To show her who was master. But Djibi admitted no punishment. The very notion of it, so well known to dogs, was completely alien to her. She submitted to neither ill-treatment nor to punishment. Nothing of the kind! She had suffered gross unfairness, never gave a thought to the past, or to her once beloved friend. She had finished with him for ever. In the face of his angry attitude, she ran stealthily past him, and jumped out of the window before he had realised it. Into freedom!	Peter's face went suddenly white, and he turned and ran through the barn to the hayloft. His throat burned, and he held his fists clenched at his sides and his body rigid. Jibby appeared at the top of the steps just as the boy threw himself down in the hay and began to cry. She ran up to her playmate, prepared as usual to settle in his lap and lay her head under his chin. Peter gave her a push, which Jibby mistook for part of a new game. She scratched his knees and sprang to her proud perch on his shoulder. But Peter, busy with his first grown-up sorrow, knocked her off with a brusk swipe that sent her sprawling. "Go away, Jibby!" he said, putting his head down on his arms again. But the kitten gave a blow for a blow. Lightning fast her paw raked across the boy's hand, making the blood come. Peter sat up and stared at her, nursing his hand. Jibby did not retreat. She sat spitting at him, paws raised for defense or attack. Peter forgot that he had fished her out of the cold river. He forgot Jibby was his hard-earned pet. For a moment she was a wildly excited enemy and he her wounded antagonist. The kitten, still spitting, began to back away. She had seen Peter's face change. He was big and strong, and he looked as if he meant to punish her. Jibby, however, was not one to take punishment. The notion was foreign to her kind. She had seen the dogs cower and whimper under Mrs. Julius' light discipline, but Jibby was not a dog. If she could not win by scratching and spitting, she could run. Peter caught up with her at the trapdoor. He lifted her roughly by the scruff of the neck and dropped her all the way to the barn floor below. Jibby landed on the planks with a thud and a cry of pain. Then she slowly rose to her feet, arching her back and half turning toward the haymow. Then she relaxed: her babyhood was over. Without a backward look toward her one-time friend and benefactor, she sailed in a graceful curve through the open barn door and took to the open.

The book has also been translated at least into French in 1946 and into Swedish in 1974, both with Linsenmaier's illustrations; the Swedish translation is slightly shortened. A 2016 Finnish translation is unillustrated. In 2016, Raya Levin's translation was published also in the United States, illustrated presumably by Richard Cowdrey.
