= The Shaggy Dog (2006 film) =

2006 film by Brian Robbins

- Theatrical release poster
- Directed by: Brian Robbins
- Screenplay by: The Wibberleys; Geoff Rodkey; Jack Amiel; Michael Begler
- Based on: The Shaggy Dog by; Bill Walsh; Lillie Hayward; The Shaggy D.A. by Don Tait; The Hound of Florence by Felix Salten (uncr.)
- Produced by: Tim Allen; David Hoberman; Robert Simonds
- Starring: Tim Allen; Robert Downey Jr.; Kristin Davis; Danny Glover; Spencer Breslin; Philip Baker Hall
- Cinematography: Gabriel Beristain
- Edited by: Ned Bastille
- Music by: Alan Menken
- Production companies: Walt Disney Pictures; Mandeville Films; Boxing Cat Films; Tollin/Robbins Productions; Robert Simonds Productions
- Distributed by: Buena Vista Pictures Distribution
- Release date: March 10, 2006
- Running time: 98 minutes
- Country: United States
- Language: English
- Budget: $50 million
- Box office: $87.1 million

The Shaggy Dog is a 2006 American science fantasy family comedy film directed by Brian Robbins and written by The Wibberleys, Geoff Rodkey, Jack Amiel, and Michael Begler. It is the fifth overall and final installment of the titular franchise and is a reboot of the 1959 film of the same name and its 1976 sequel The Shaggy D.A., both of which were loosely based on the 1923 novel The Hound of Florence by Felix Salten. The original film had a character named Wilby Daniels transforming into an Old English Sheepdog after putting on a magic ring whereas the remake presents a character named Dave Douglas transforming into a Bearded Collie after getting bitten by a sacred dog. It stars Tim Allen, Robert Downey Jr., Kristin Davis, Danny Glover, Spencer Breslin and Philip Baker Hall.

The Shaggy Dog was released on March 10, 2006, by Buena Vista Pictures Distribution. It received mixed-to-negative reviews from critics and many fans of the original film series due to its differences from the source material and grossed $87.1 million against its $50 million budget.

== Plot ==
In Los Angeles County, deputy district attorney Dave Douglas is prosecuting social studies teacher and activist Justin Forrester for firebombing the pharmaceutical corporation Grant and Strictland. Forrester denies this but claims that the corporation has been engaging in illegal animal experimentation. This distances Dave from his 17-year-old daughter Carly, one of Forrester's students.

Geneticists working for company president Lance Strictland, led by Dr. Marcus Kozak, have stolen Khyi Yang Po, a 300-year-old sacred dog (a Bearded Collie) from a Tibetan monastery. Khyi Yang Po's genetic sequence, when isolated and put into a vaccination, alters the cells and DNA of a victim.

Carly brings the dog, whom she calls 'Shaggy', home. Returning from work, Dave takes Shaggy out in the garage, then the dog runs to get the newspaper. The dog gives him his newspaper, and Dave reaches for it, only to be bitten on the hand by Shaggy. Its saliva and cells infect Dave. Shaggy is taken to be tested for rabies, and the tests came back negative. Over the next days, Dave realizes that he uncontrollably transforms into a sheepdog like Shaggy when prompted by distractions and activities typical of a dog, such as a stick thrown through the air and chasing cats. These transformations can be reversed by sleeping. His family, unaware of Dave's condition, continue housing Dave as a dog, thinking that it is Shaggy.

In the ongoing trial, Forrester testifies to seeing the animals behaving like dogs and the presence of a dog he identifies as a giant sheepdog, sparking Dave's suspicions about Grant and Strictland. When his dog-like behavior annoys the judge, Dave is removed from the case. Seeking answers to his transformation, Dave heads to Grant and Strictland. He has a homeless man help him transform so that he may sneak in through a vent. Hidden in the laboratory, Dave witnesses Kozak injecting Strictland with a drug that will paralyze him for months, giving Kozak time to usurp control of the company. Viewing security cameras, Kozak and his minions realize that Dave can transform into a copy of Shaggy.

Dave returns home, still in his canine form, and overhears a conversation between Carly and her 12-year-old brother Josh. They say that their parents (Dave and his wife Rebecca) may be splitting up. Dave knocks over a Scrabble game and uses the letters to reveal his identity to his kids. While getting out of the house, Dave is tased by Kozak's minions. His kids attempt to save him but end up picking up Shaggy instead and rush to Rebecca at work to report recent events.

Dave is taken to the laboratory to be euthanized, but Kozak has a court summons and must deal with Dave later. Before exiting, Kozak mocks Dave in canine form. Enraged, Dave bites Kozak. The other mutated animals in the laboratory tell Dave to meditate to reverse his transformation. Dave succeeds in returning to human form and escapes with the other animals. He drives to the courthouse and calls Rebecca to ready a change of clothes for him at the courthouse but is forced to abandon the car with the animals when they get stuck in traffic. Dave runs on all fours to trigger his transformation and get to the courthouse in time. At the courthouse entrance, his attempts to tell Rebecca that he loves her allow him to transform back.

In the courtroom, Dave mocks Kozak by implying that he was working under Strictland's shadow and angers him. The two begin growling at each other, and the judge, impatient by Dave's canine behavior, orders the bailiff to remove him. Dave grabs the bailiff's baton and tells Kozak to fetch it. This triggers a partial transformation in Kozak and thus implicates him in illegal and unethical experimentation. The pharmaceutical company is returned to Strictland, and the mutant animals enter protective custody.

Dave's family later vacations with Shaggy in Hawaii. There, Josh tosses a frisbee, and Dave catches it with his mouth.

== Cast ==
- Tim Allen as David "Dave" Douglas / The Shaggy Dog
- Robert Downey Jr. as Dr. Marcus Kozak
- Kristin Davis as Rebecca Douglas
- Zena Grey as Carly Douglas
- Spencer Breslin as Joshua "Josh" Douglas
- Danny Glover as Kenneth "Ken" Hollister
- Jane Curtin as Judge Claire Whittaker
- Philip Baker Hall as Dr. Lance Strictland
- Bess Wohl as Dr. Gwen Lichtman
- Jarrad Paul as Larry
- Shawn Pyfrom as Trey
- Joshua Leonard as Justin Forrester
- Annabelle Gurwitch as Justin Forrester's Attorney
- Rhea Seehorn as Lori
- Jane Hajduk as A News Reporter
- Joel David Moore as A Dog Pound Employee
- Phil Pavel as A Highway Driver
- Jordyn Colemon as Tracy
- Adam Hicks as A Quarterback
- Cole as Khyi Yang Po / The Shaggy Dog
- Martin Sru as "Bin Bag"
- Crystal the Monkey as Monkey

== Production ==
=== Animation and visual effects ===
Tippett Studio provided the animation and visual effects for the film. Tom Schelesny and Stephen Rosenbaum served as the visual effects supervisors. Schelesny stated, "We did about 110 shots. We weren't the only vendor, but we did all the 3D animation and characters. We had about 50 artists at our studio working on it for about a year. We modeled and animated with Maya. We made 12 computer-generated characters."

== Release ==
The film was released in the United States on March 10, 2006. To tie in with the theatrical release of the remake, the original 1959 film was reissued in the United States as a special DVD labeled "The Wild & Woolly Edition", which featured the film in two forms: one in the original black-and-white, the other a colorized version. The colorized version, however, is not restored and suffers from age. In the UK, the 1959 film has only ever been made available on DVD in black and white.

== Reception ==
=== Box office ===
The Shaggy Dog grossed $61.1 million in the United States and $26 million in other territories for a worldwide total of $87.1 million, against its budget of $60 million.

In its opening weekend, the film made $16.3 million, finishing second at the box office behind Failure to Launch ($24.4 million).

=== Critical response ===
On Rotten Tomatoes, the film has an approval rating of 25% based on 103 reviews and an average rating of 4.4/10. The site's critical consensus reads: "This Disney retread has neither inspiration nor originality, but may please moviegoers under the age of ten." On Metacritic, the film has a score of 43 out of 100 based on 25 critics, indicating "mixed or average reviews". Audiences polled by CinemaScore gave the film an average grade of "B+" on an A+ to F scale.

BBC called Allen uninteresting and said he "only stops short of leg-humping in his attempts to win our affections." Roger Ebert of The Chicago-Sun Times gave the film two stars out of four, writing, "This is surely one of the fundamental laws of fiction: when a dog and a man change bodies, it is funnier to see the man act like a dog than to see the dog act like a man." At the Razzie Awards, the film earned three nominations, Worst Actor for Tim Allen, Worst Remake or Rip-Off and Worst Excuse for Family Entertainment, but failed to "win" any of those categories. Variety Chief Film Critic Justin Chang noted that "its occasional lump-in-the-throat moments are almost effortlessly achieved, thanks to strong work from [Kristin] Davis and Spencer Breslin in particular."

== Soundtrack ==
The soundtrack to The Shaggy Dog was released on March 14, 2006. The entire score is by Alan Menken.

1. "Big Dog" - Akon
2. "Man's Best Friend" - The Click Five
3. "Atomic Dog" - George Clinton
4. "Every Dog Has Its Day" - Jaja Biggs
5. "Somethin' About You" - Doghouse Biscuit Band
6. "Woof! There It Is" - Kevin Mathurin
7. "It's A Dog" - Kyle Massey
8. "Tibet" - 2:33
9. "First Signs" - 3:00
10. "Transformation" - 4:04
11. "Magic Lab" - 2:19
12. "Breaking Through" - 2:50
13. "Kozak Gets A Tail" - 2:34
14. "Meditation" - 1:06
15. "Escaping the Lab" - 4:42
16. "To The Rescue" - 4:54
17. "Family Time" - 1:20

== Home media ==
The film was released on DVD on August 1, 2006.

== See also ==
- Felix Salten, the author of the 1923 novel The Hound of Florence, the source material for the 1959 film
- The Shaggy Dog, the original 1959 theatrical film
- The Shaggy D.A., the 1976 theatrical sequel
- The Return of the Shaggy Dog, the 1987 television sequel
- The Shaggy Dog, the 1994 television film and the first remake of the 1959 film
- Nine Lives, a 2016 family comedy film with a similar premise
- List of 21st-century films considered the worst
