= Zsolnai =

Zsolnai [ˈʒolnɒi] or Zsolnay is a Hungarian habitational surname originally used to denote a person from the city Žilina (Hungarian: Zsolna) in northwestern Slovakia. It may refer to:

== Zsolnai ==
- Balázs Zsolnai, Hungarian entomologist
- Hédi Zsolnai (1924–2004), Hungarian actress
- János Zsolnai (1924–1994), Hungarian footballer
- Júlia Zsolnai (born 1949), Hungarian actress
- Richárd Zsolnai (born 1994), Hungarian footballer
- Róbert Zsolnai (born 1982), Hungarian footballer

== Zsolnay ==
- Paul Zsolnay (1895–1961), Austrian publisher
- Vilmos Zsolnay (1828–1900), Hungarian potter
