= The Shaggy D.A. =

1976 film directed by Robert Stevenson

- Theatrical release poster
- Directed by: Robert Stevenson
- Written by: Don Tait
- Based on: The Hound of Florence by Felix Salten
- Produced by: Bill Anderson
- Starring: Dean Jones; Suzanne Pleshette; Tim Conway; Keenan Wynn
- Cinematography: Frank V. Phillips
- Edited by: Bob Bring; Norman R. Palmer
- Music by: Buddy Baker
- Production company: Walt Disney Productions
- Distributed by: Buena Vista Distribution
- Release date: December 16, 1976
- Running time: 91 minutes
- Country: United States
- Language: English
- Box office: $10.5 million (US and Canada rentals)

The Shaggy D.A. is a 1976 American comedy film and a sequel to The Shaggy Dog (1959) produced by Walt Disney Productions. It was directed by Robert Stevenson and written by Don Tait. As with the first film in the series, it takes some inspiration from the Felix Salten novel, The Hound of Florence.

It starts with Dean Jones as the adult Wilby Daniels, Suzanne Pleshette, Tim Conway, Keenan Wynn, Dick Van Patten, Jo Anne Worley and Shane Sinutko. It was Stevenson's final film.

== Plot ==
Returning to the town of Medfield from a vacation, a family discovers that they have been robbed. The father, successful attorney Wilby Daniels, blames district attorney John Slade, who is reputed to have connections with organized crime, particularly with warehouse owner Edward Roshak. After being robbed a second time that night (along with their neighbor), Wilby vows to run for district attorney to make his town safe again.

Meanwhile, the two thugs who robbed the Daniels', Freddie and Dip, observe the Borgia ring at a museum and assume that it might be valuable, so they steal it. The ring, however, can only be pawned off to ice cream salesman Tim, who owns Elwood, an Old English Sheepdog. Tim plans to give the ring to his girlfriend, pastry assistant Katrinka. Unbeknownst to them, if the inscription on the ring (Note: "In canis corpore transmuto". This is meant to be translated as "I transmute into the body of a dog", though the Latin is slightly ungrammatical here; "in" for "into" should have been followed by an accusative "corpus" rather than an ablative, which makes the translation "In the body of a dog I transmute.") is spoken aloud Wilby will turn into a shaggy dog.

Before Wilby's live television debut, Tim discovers the inscription on the ring and reads it aloud, causing Elwood to disappear – only to reappear as he takes over Wilby's body. Wilby's son Brian notices that shaggy hair is growing all over Wilby, who starts turning into Elwood. Wilby rushes from the house and cameras in his dog form and confounds Tim, who cannot understand why Elwood can speak. When the spell wears off, Wilby regains his human form.

Katrinka eventually receives the ring and reads the inscription, just as Wilby is giving a public address at a ladies garden club. Realizing that he is transforming again, Wilby creates a riot while trying to escape. Tim again finds him in Elwood's form and is convinced that his talking dog could make millions; when Tim wanders off momentarily, Wilby returns to his human form. Meanwhile, Raymond, an agent of Slade, wonders why Wilby keeps disappearing.

Desperate to find the ring, the hunt leads to Katrinka, who loses it in a vat of pie filling intended for a Slade fundraiser. Offering a reward to whoever finds the ring, Katrinka and her colleagues look for it, eventually escalating into a pie fight. During it, the thugs recover the ring and attempt to pass it off to an undercover police detective. Once again in the hands of the museum, the inscription is read aloud as a point of reference; at the police station, Wilby (who arrived to confirm that the ring had been recovered) finds himself turning into Elwood again. Raymond understands what is happening after overhearing the museum's curator explaining the curse and how his predecessor (Note: From the first film.) mentioned the story of a young man who turned into a sheepdog years before.

Slade is informed of this, is dubious at first, and then invites Wilby to his office to test out the theory. Wilby says that after being elected, he will have Slade investigated regarding his criminal connections. Slade then reads the inscription. After Wilby turns into the dog, Slade makes a call to a dog pound. Wilby escapes while Slade repeatedly reads the inscription. This guarantees that the spell will not wear off, and he will be trapped in a dog's form indefinitely. Slade keeps reciting the incantation over and over, ignoring warnings that doing that could cause the spell to transfer to him.

Wilby tries to elude Slade, who as district attorney has the entire police force and animal control at his disposal. Eventually, Wilby is caught and taken to the pound where he can understand the other dogs, who band together to help him escape.

Aided by Brian and Tim (to whom Wilby explains what really happened), Wilby gets evidence that Slade is connected to organized crime. Wilby and Tim trick Slade into showing up at Roshak's warehouse, and Wilby uses a tape recorder to collect information that confirms Slade's wrongdoings. Aided by his dog friends from the pound, he also retrieves the ring from Slade, who has read the inscription aloud so many times that the curse has now passed onto him, causing him to transform into a bulldog. Wilby gets elected district attorney, Slade is jailed after being stopped by the police for speeding, and Tim gets engaged to Katrinka. Together, they adopt the dogs from the pound.

== Cast ==
- Dean Jones as Wilby Daniels/The Shaggy Dog
- Tim Conway as Tim
- Suzanne Pleshette as Betty Daniels
- Keenan Wynn as John Slade
- Jo Anne Worley as Katrinka Muggelberg
- Dick Van Patten as Raymond
- Shane Sinutko as Brian Daniels
- Vic Tayback as Eddie Roshak
- John Myhers as Admiral Brenner
- Richard Bakalyan as Freddie
- Warren Berlinger as Dip
- John Fiedler as Howie Clemmings
- Hans Conried as Professor Whatley
- Michael McGreevey as Sheldon
- Richard O'Brien as Desk sergeant
- Richard Lane as Roller rink announcer
- Benny Rubin as Waiter
- Ruth Gillette as Song chairman
- Henry Z Jones Jr. as Policeman
- Iris Adrian as Manageress
- Pat McCormick as Bartender
- Henry Slate as Taxi driver
- Milton Frome as Auctioneer
- Walt Davis as TV cameraman
- Albert Able as TV technician
- Mary Ann Gibson, Helene Winston, Joan Crosby as Daisyettes
- Sarah Fankboner as Shopper
- Danny Wells as Police official
- Herb Vigran, Olan Soule as Bar patrons
- Vern Rowe as Dawson
- Karl Lukas as Painter
- John Hayes as Stranger
- Christina Anderson as Lonnie
- George Kirby as "Pound" canine character voices

== Background ==
The Shaggy D.A. is a sequel to The Shaggy Dog, which had been the most profitable film produced by Walt Disney Productions to that point and heavily influenced the studio's live-action film production for the next two decades. Using a formula of placing supernatural and/or fantastical forces within everyday mid-twentieth century American life, the studio was able to create a long series of "gimmick comedies" (a term coined by Disney historian and film critic Leonard Maltin) with enough action to keep children entertained and a touch of light satire to engage their adult chaperones. Using television actors on their summer hiatus— who were familiar to audiences but did not necessarily have enough clout to receive over-the-title billing (or a large fee) from another major studio— was one way these comedies were produced inexpensively; they also tended to use the same sets from the Disney backlot. This allowed Walt Disney Productions a low-risk scenario for production; any of these films could easily make back their investment just from moderate attendance, and they could also be packaged on the successful Disney anthology television series The Wonderful World of Disney (some of these films were expressly structured for this purpose).

Occasionally, one of these inexpensive comedies would become a runaway success and place at or near the top of the box office for their respective release year (e.g., The Absent-Minded Professor, The Love Bug). The initial release of The Shaggy Dog in 1959 grossed more than $9 million on a budget of less than $1 million, and also performed very strongly on a 1967 re-release.

== Production notes ==
=== Cast and crew ===
Dean Jones and Suzanne Pleshette were frequently paired in other Disney gimmick comedies, such as Blackbeard's Ghost and The Ugly Dachshund. Keenan Wynn had played villainous Alonzo Hawk in many other Disney comedies before taking on the role of John Slade.

This is the last of 19 films Robert Stevenson directed at Disney that spanned nearly 20 years. His first was Johnny Tremain in 1957. He also directed a number of episodes for the series Disneyland. This is also Stevenson's final film. The first film that he directed was Happy Ever After, a 1932 German musical.

=== Music ===
The film's theme song, "The Shaggy D.A.", was written by Shane Tatum and Richard McKinley. The song was sung by Dean Jones.

=== Setting ===
The story was set in fictional Medfield, a town that (along with its eponymous Medfield College) was the setting for six other Disney gimmick comedies, including The Absent-Minded Professor, its sequel Son of Flubber, The Million Dollar Duck and the Dexter Riley trilogy (The Computer Wore Tennis Shoes, Now You See Him Now You Don't, and The Strongest Man in the World).

=== Transformation device ===
The mythology of the Borgia ring was changed from the first film, in which young Wilby read the inscription on the ring once and then was the victim of random transformations which could only be stopped if he performed a heroic deed. In this sequel, he simply turned into a dog whenever the ring's inscription was read aloud, and the spell would generally last from five to ten minutes.

In the television film The Return of the Shaggy Dog (1987), which takes place between the events of the original film and this sequel, the mythology changes once again: now, once the inscription is read, Wilby is trapped in dog form until it is read again.

The 2006 remake with Tim Allen eschewed the situation and characters of the three initial films (and also a 1994 television remake which returned the mythology of the original 1959 film) and opted instead for a science fiction device of a man being bitten by a viral dog that infected him with a serum that affected his DNA.

== Reception ==
A. H. Weiler of The New York Times wrote: "Naturally, the story line is incredible and convoluted enough to give an uninhibited cast plenty of opportunities to clown for, unfortunately, a minimum of real laughs ... Despite all the athletic goings-on, The Shaggy D.A. does turn into a dog too often for comfort." Roger Ebert gave the film two-and-a-half stars out of four and called it "one of Disney's better recent efforts". Gene Siskel awarded three stars out of four and declared it "far better than most of the live-action comedies to come out of the studio in recent years. Don Tait actually has written a cute script that gives adults in the audience a few laughs while watching the inevitable and unending pratfalls designed for the kids." Variety wrote that the film "looks like a comparable commercial winner. It has all the elements of smooth and sunny comedy that Disney does best, and it marks a return to top studio craftsmanship after a few uneven pix of late." Charles Champlin of the Los Angeles Times wrote that "The Shaggy D.A. is right off the assembly line, but it is still the most competent line of its kind." Gary Arnold of The Washington Post called the film "a surprisingly snappy and diverting Disney farce". Jill Forbes of The Monthly Film Bulletin called it "dully scripted and poorly paced, and so frequently interrupted by set pieces (the pie fight and Tim's attempt to make his dog talk) that it never succeeds in exploiting a situation which is gratuitous when it is not gruesome."

The film opened at Christmas in 1976 at the same time as the remake of King Kong which slowed its initial performance, but the film performed better after the Christmas holidays and earned rentals of $10.5 million in the United States and Canada.

== Legacy ==
The film has been seen as a light satire of American politics in the post-Watergate era, with politicians being depicted as tied to crime, and not being what they appear to be.

A television film, The Return of the Shaggy Dog, followed in 1987, taking place between The Shaggy Dog and The Shaggy D.A..

The original 1959 film has been remade twice: first, as a television film in 1994 and as a theatrical feature in 2006.

Triumph the Insult Comic Dog referenced the film in the lyrics to one of his songs: "He gave head to the Shaggy D.A., and that's how we know that Benji's gay!"

The 2019 film Mister America depicts The Shaggy D.A. as part of Gregg Turkington's fictional "Victorville Film Archives" project. Mister America also has several notable similarities to The Shaggy D.A., which are commented on by Turkington throughout the film.
