= Neue Menschen auf alter Erde =

1925 travel book by Felix Salten

Neue Menschen auf alter Erde: Eine Palästinafahrt
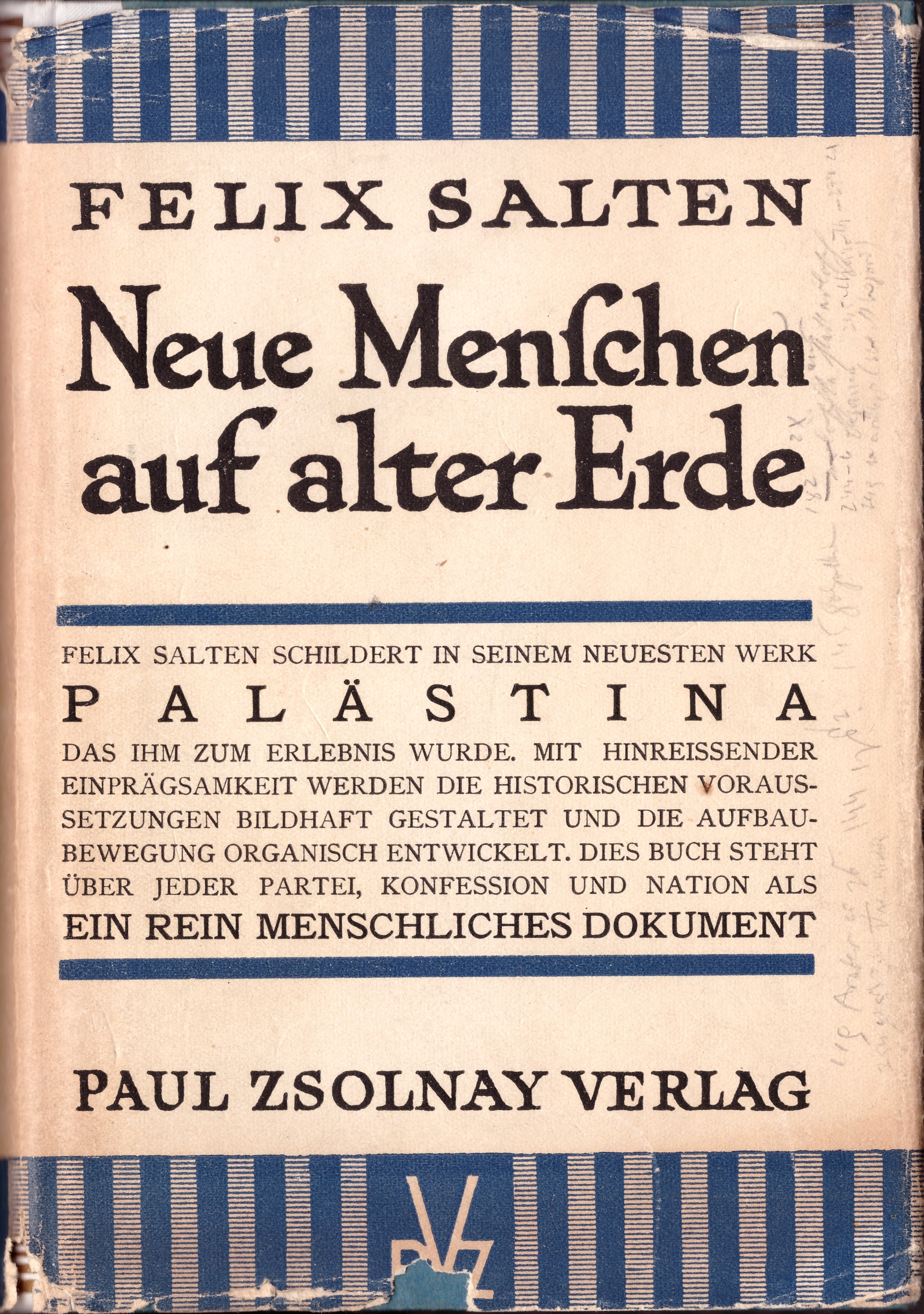
- Author: Felix Salten
- Language: German
- Subject: Mandatory Palestine
- Genre: travel literature
- Published: 1925
- Publisher: Paul Zsolnay Verlag
- Publication place: Austria
- Pages: 276
- LC Class: DS107.3 .S18

Neue Menschen auf alter Erde: Eine Palästinafahrt (German: “New people on ancient soil: A tour to Palestine”) is a 1925 travel book by Felix Salten, depicting his 1924 visit to Mandatory Palestine. Neue Menschen auf alter Erde was first published as a series of feuilletons in a Vienna newspaper. Salten considered it one of his two books worthy of special mention.

Felix Salten was awakened to his Jewish heritage and to the cause of Zionism by the journalist and writer Theodor Herzl who in 1896 published the pamphlet Der Judenstaat and became a personal friend to Salten. Later, Salten contributed to Herzl’s newspaper Die Zeit.

In 1902, Herzl published an influential utopian novel about a future Jewish state in Palestine, Altneuland, but he died in 1904, before his dream could become reality. During that era, however, antisemitic sentiments and pogroms drew Jews to immigrate to Palestine and to acquire land and to found settlements.

Felix Salten’s tour of Palestine is situated after the third Aliyah, early 1924. His trip was partly funded by his friend and publisher Paul Zsolnay, and the feuilletons were published in Wiener Allgemeine Zeitung, starting 6 June 1924.

Salten travelled via Egypt and Sinai to Jerusalem and visited several cities and settlements, including Tel Aviv, Ein Harod, Tel Yosef, Bethlehem, Rosh Pinna, Kinneret, and Haifa, to see how Herzl’s dream was being realized there. He also saw several Biblical sites.

Neue Menschen auf alter Erde contains several kinds of material: subjective depictions of landscapes, discussions with local people, participating observations of daily life, autobiographical sketches, ponderings upon the history of Jews and the Judaic religion, especially the character of Moses. Sometimes he presents surprising analogues and reflections, like comparing Safed to Prague or the antagonism between Arabs and Jews to that between cats and dogs, and describes the tourism industry of the Holy Land ironically.

The title and the content of the book refer indirectly to Altneuland, and the book can be characterized as “a paean to Herzl’s Zionist dream” and a justification of the future Jewish state.

Salten recognized the threat that was posed by the militant Arabs, and stressed the importance of peaceful relations:

“This policy of peace and conciliation is the only proper one that the Jews can exercise. It corresponds to the Jewish hearts, the Jewish spirit, corresponds to the true, humane commandments. Here, on the soil of their original homeland, the Jews must not tread like Europeans lusty for conquest, must not set violence against violence. They must not do that even when they would have the full power to do so. [...] They are now sowing the seed in the earth and in human hearts for eternal cohabitation with the Arabs, and if they now sow hate or vengeance, they will never harvest love or even tolerance. They must approach the Semitic Arab people, who are their brothers, in brotherly fashion.”

Since 1925, Neue Menschen auf alter Erde has been reprinted several times and has been translated into Finnish.
