= The Old New Land =

1902 novel published by Theodor Herzl

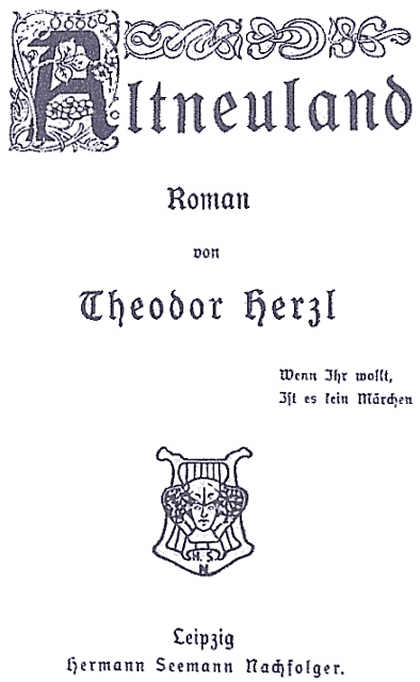
- First edition cover
- Author: Theodor Herzl
- Original title: Altneuland
- Translator: Lotta Levensohn (1997 edition)
- Language: German
- Genre: Utopian novel
- Publisher: Seemann Nachf
- Publication date: 1902
- Publication place: Austria-Hungary
- Media type: Print
- Pages: 343
- OCLC: 38767535

The Old New Land (German: Altneuland; Yiddish: אַלטנײַלאַנד, romanized: Altnayland) is a utopian novel published in German by Theodor Herzl, the founder of political Zionism, in 1902. It was published six years after Herzl's political pamphlet, Der Judenstaat (The Jewish State) and expanded on Herzl's vision for a Jewish return to the Land of Israel, which helped Altneuland become one of Zionism's establishing texts. It was translated into Yiddish by Israel Isidor Elyashev (Altnayland. Warsaw, 1902), and into Hebrew by Nahum Sokolow as תֵּל־אָבִיב, Tel Aviv (Warsaw, 1902). The name was adopted for the newly founded city of Tel Aviv.

== Novel outline ==
The novel tells the story of Friedrich Löwenberg, a young Jewish Viennese intellectual, who, tired with European decadence, joins an Americanized Prussian aristocrat named Kingscourt as they retire to a remote Pacific island (it is specifically mentioned as being part of the Cook Islands, near Rarotonga) in 1902. Stopping in Jaffa on their way to the Pacific, they find Palestine a backward, destitute and sparsely populated land, as it appeared to Herzl on his visit in 1898. Löwenberg and Kingscourt spend the following twenty years on the island, cut off from civilization. As they stop over in Palestine on their way back to Europe in 1923, they are astonished to discover a land drastically transformed.

A Jewish organization officially named the "New Society" has since risen as European Jews have rediscovered and re-inhabited their Altneuland, reclaiming their own destiny in the Land of Israel. The country, whose leaders include some old acquaintances from Vienna, is now prosperous and well-populated, boasts a thriving cooperative industry based on state-of-the-art technology, and is home to a free, just, and cosmopolitan modern society. In Haifa, Löwenberg and Reschid Bey meet a group of Jewish leaders who take them on a tour of the country. They visit various cities and settlements, including a kibbutz and a moshav, where they witness the social and economic transformation of the Jewish community. They also learn about the development of new technologies and the establishment of a Jewish university that leads scientific research. Arabs have full equal rights with Jews, with an Arab engineer among the New Society's leaders, and most merchants in the country are Armenians, Greeks, and members of other ethnic groups.

Eventually Löwenberg and Kingscourt decide to stay in the new state.

== Major themes ==
Herzl's novel depicts his vision for the realization of Jewish national emancipation, as put forward in his book Der Judenstaat (The Jewish State) published in 1896. Both ideological and utopian, it presents a model society which was to adopt a liberal and egalitarian social model, resembling a modern welfare society. Herzl called his model "Mutualism" and it is based on a mixed economy, with public ownership of the land and natural resources, agricultural cooperatives, welfare, while at the same time encouraging private entrepreneurship. Herzl rejected the European class system, yet remained loyal to Europe's cultural heritage.

While the language question is not discussed in detail, it appears that the society is multilingual, with Yiddish being the main vernacular language and German the main written language.

While Jerusalem is the capital, with the seat of parliament ("Congress") and the Jewish Academy, the country's industrial center is the modern city of Haifa. Herzl saw the potential of Haifa Bay for constructing a modern deep-water port. As envisioned by Herzl, "All the way from Acco to Mount Carmel stretched what seemed to be one great park".

Herzl's depiction of Jerusalem includes a rebuilt Jerusalem Temple. However, in his view, the Temple did not need to be built on the precise site where the old Temple stood and which is now taken up by the Muslim Al-Aqsa Mosque and Dome of the Rock - very sensitive holy sites. By locating the Temple at a different Jerusalem location, the Jewish state envisioned by Herzl avoids the extreme tension over this issue experienced in the actual Israel. The Temple depicted in Alteneuland is essentially just an especially big and ornate synagogue, holding the same kind of services as any other synagogue.

The country envisioned in the book is not involved in any wars and does not maintain any armed forces. As explained in the book, the founders took care to get the consent of all European powers for their enterprise and not get entangled in any inter-power rivalry. As for the country's Arab inhabitants, the book's single Arab character, Rashid Bey, explains that the Arabs saw no reason to oppose the influx of Jews, who "developed the country and raised everybody's standard of living".

== Historical context ==
The novel was significant in the establishment of Zionist ideas as it was published in the time period of the First Aliyah. Altneuland also reflects Herzl's belief in the importance of technology and progress. The Jewish state in the novel is a highly advanced society, where scientific and technological innovation is celebrated and valued. This reflects Herzl's belief that the Jewish people needed to embrace modernity in order to succeed in the modern world. Additionally, Altneuland also highlights Herzl's commitment to social equality and the idea of a multicultural Jewish society. The novel portrays a Jewish state where Jews and Arabs live together in harmony, reflecting Herzl's belief in the importance of coexistence and mutual respect between different communities.

Altneuland, at the time of the rise of Zionism as a political movement in the late 19th and early 20th centuries, saw the emergence of a new form of Jewish nationalism that sought to establish a Jewish state in Palestine began to prevail. The Zionist movement was fueled by a range of factors: the aggressive rise of anti-Semitism in Europe, the unifying sense of Jewish identity and solidarity that followed, and the desire for a homeland where Jews could live free from persecution and not be a minority in their society inspired a new wave of Zionism led by individuals like Theodore Hertzl.

The novel directly reflected Herzl's political philosophy represented through a new form, literature. The novel presented a modern, democratic, and multicultural Jewish state, which was a departure from the traditional religious and cultural identity of the Jewish people. Herzl emphasized the importance of Jewish self-determination and the need for a Jewish state to ensure the safety of the Jewish people. Herzl believed that the Jewish community was a nation and needed a state of its own to survive in the modern world. This idea became a pillar of Zionism and was later instrumental in the need for the establishment of the State of Israel.

Herzl picked the name of the novel being inspired by his repeated visits to the Old-New Synagogue in Prague.

In the afterword Herzl writes that he worked on the book for three years.

== Legacy ==
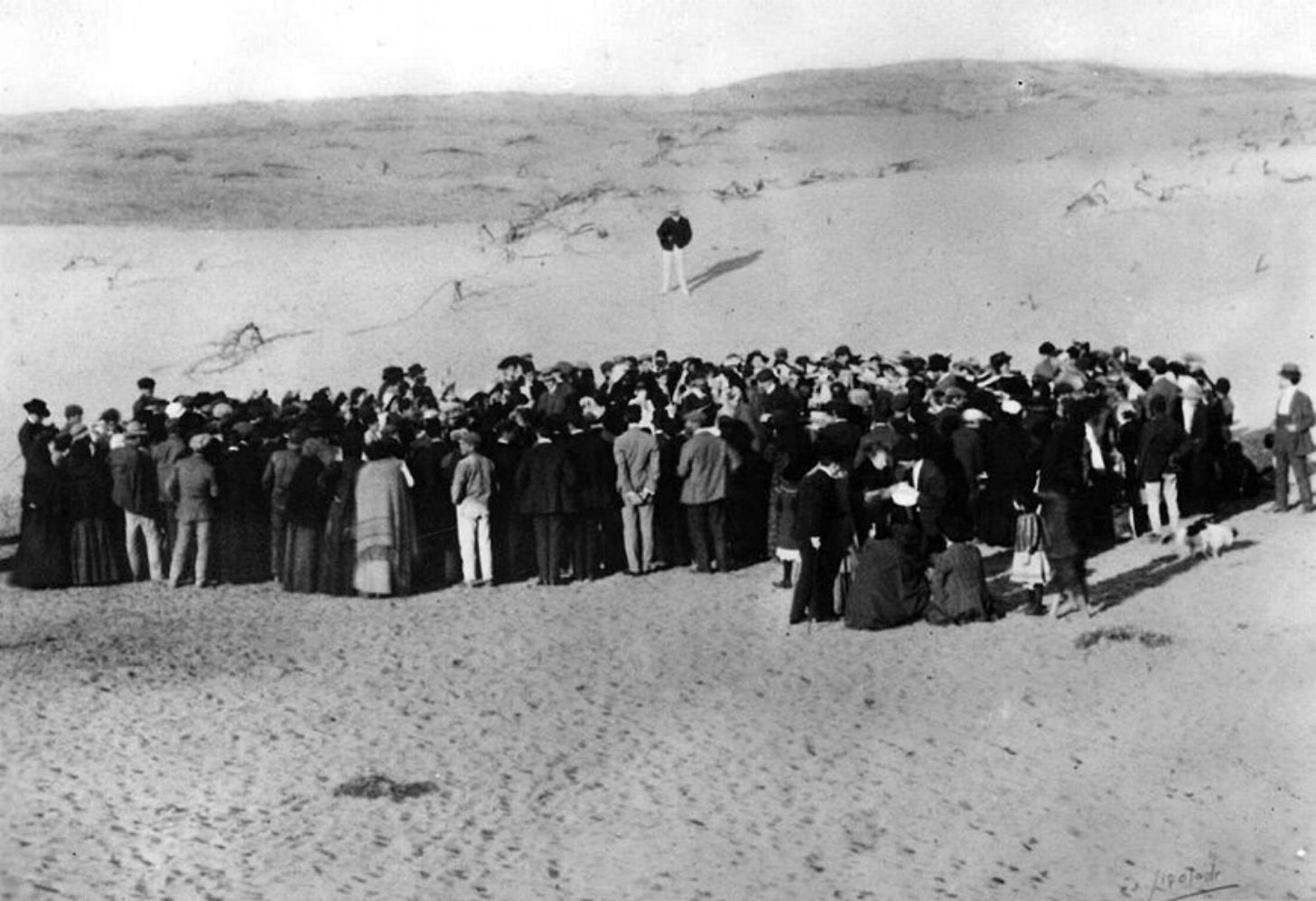
Tel Aviv was founded on land purchased from Bedouins, north of the existing city of Jaffa. This photograph is of 1909 auction of the first lots.

The book was immediately translated into Hebrew by Nahum Sokolow, who gave it the poetic title "Tel Aviv", using tel ('ancient mound') for 'old' and aviv ('spring') for 'new'. The name as such appears in the Book of Ezekiel, where it is used for a place in Babylonia to which the Israelites had been exiled. The Hebrew title of the book was chosen by Jewish residents as the name for the newly purchased twelve acres of sand dunes, north of Jaffa, established in 1909 under a company name "Ahuzat Bayit (lit. "homestead") society", and with the financial assistance of the Jewish National Fund. The town was originally named Ahuzat Bayit. On 21 May 1910, the name Tel Aviv was adopted. Eventually, Tel Aviv would become known as "the first [modern] Hebrew city" and a central economic and cultural hub of Israel.

Additionally, the first Hebrew edition of the Herzl biography that was written after 1948, and published by Alex Bein in 1960, reflected historical viewpoint changes based on the summary of The Old New Land. In the summary, the outline of Altneuland was significantly shorter than that of the previously published 1938 copy. The shortened summary did not include details of the interaction between Herzl's Altneuland Palestine and the ruling Ottoman empire. However, many other references to Herzl's Altneuland Palestine following the establishment of a Jewish state do not include this information as well.

Herzl's friend Felix Salten visited Palestine in 1924. The next year, Salten gave his travel book the title Neue Menschen auf alter Erde ("New People on Old Soil"), and both the title of this book and its contents allude to Herzl's Altneuland.

First Hebrew edition of the book, printed in 1902

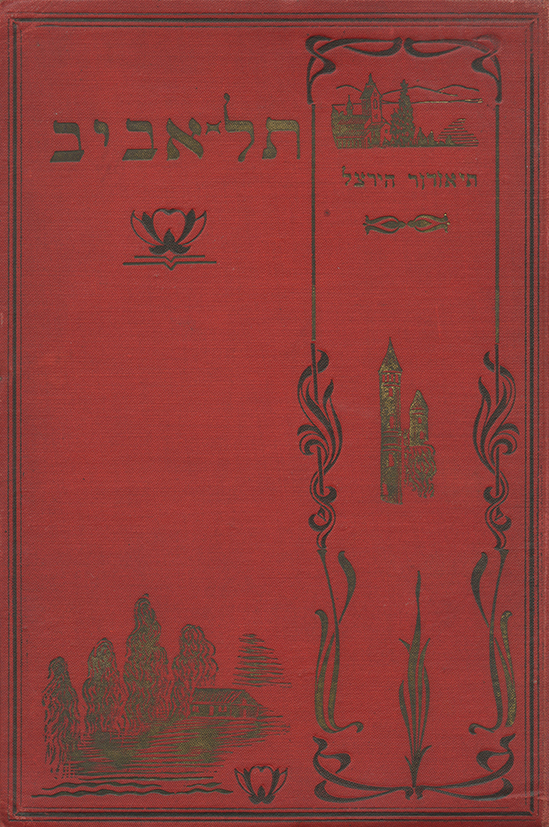

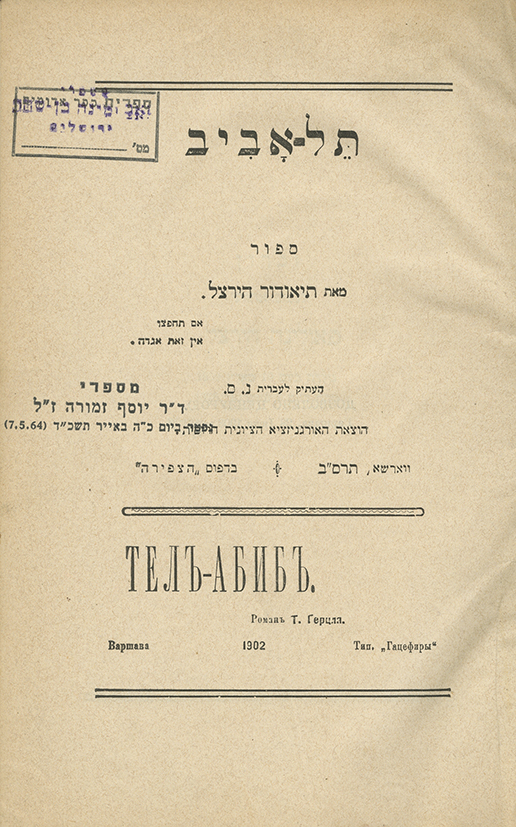

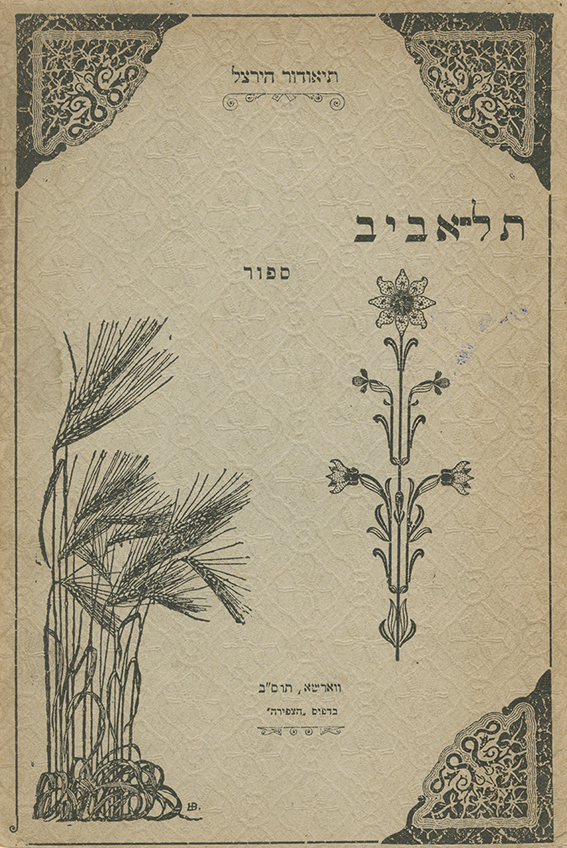

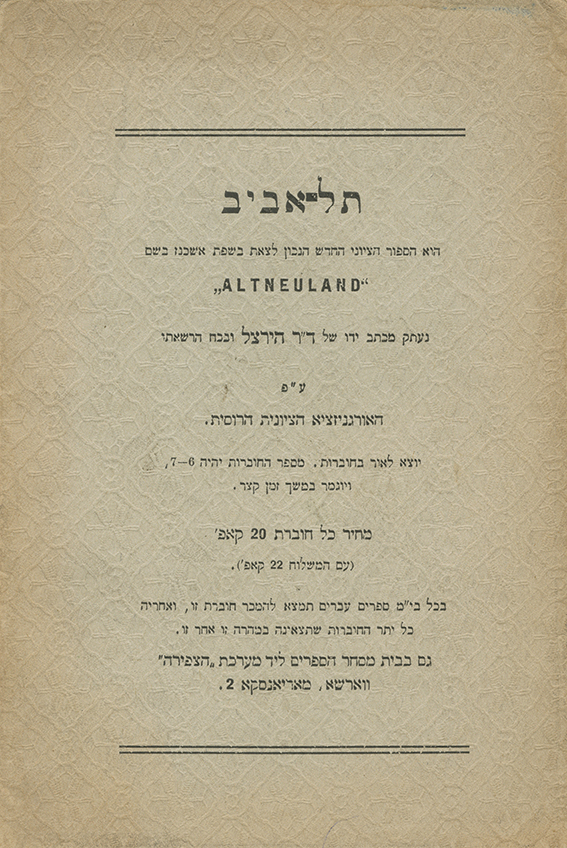

== Publication history ==
- 1902, Germany, Hermann Seemann Nachfolger, Leipzig, hardback (First edition) (as Altneuland in German)
- 1902, Russian Empire, HaZfira Press, Warsaw, titled in Hebrew: תל–אביב, romanized: Tel Aviv, (first Hebrew edition); translated by Nahum Sokolow.
- 1903, Russian Empire, titled in Russian: Обновленная страна, romanized: Obnovlennaya strana, lit. 'A Renewed Country'; translator unknown, Publisher: Stefan Kulzhenko, Kiev. It bears the notice: "Permitted by censorship, Jule 12, 1903"
- 1904, Russian Empire, titled in Russian: Обновленная земля, romanized: Obnovlennaya zemlya, lit. 'A Renewed Land'; translated by Avgusta Damanskaya
- 1941, US, Bloch Publishing, hardback (translated by Lotta Levensohn)
- 1961, Israel, Haifa Publishing, paperback (as Altneuland in German)
- 1987, US, Random House (ISBN 0-910129-61-4), paperback
- 1997, US, Wiener (Markus) Publishing (ISBN 1-55876-160-8), paperback
