= Fifteen Rabbits =

1927 novel by Felix Salten

- First English-language edition from 1930.
- Author: Felix Salten
- Original title: Fünfzehn Hasen: Schicksale in Wald und Feld
- Translator: Whittaker Chambers
- Language: German
- Genre: novel
- Published: 1929
- Publisher: Simon and Schuster
- English publication date: 1930
- Pages: 211
- LC Class: PZ3.S1733 Fi

Fifteen Rabbits (German: Fünfzehn Hasen: Schicksale in Wald und Feld) is a 1929 survival and adventure novel by the Austrian writer Felix Salten. The novel depicts a year in the life of a colony of rabbits (in the original German version, hares) in the same forest where Bambi dwells.

As the title indicates, there are 15 hares/rabbits who feature in the story, but not all of them survive to the end. Although Fifteen Rabbits is a story of a collective, the young Hops is the main character, alongside his love interest Plana.

== Publication history ==
Fifteen Rabbits was first published in German language, serialized in Neue Freie Presse newspaper from August 20 till October 10, 1929, and later that year by the Zsolnay company in Vienna as a book. In 1930, the novel was published in the United States in an English translation by Whittaker Chambers, and republished in 1942 with illustrations by Kurt Wiese, and in 1976 illustrated by John Freas. In the United Kingdom, Chambers’ translation was published with illustrations by Sheila Dunn in 1943.

After Salten was forced to exile to Switzerland, his new publisher put out new editions of his work with novel illustrations, and in 1938, Fünfzehn Hasen was published with drawings by Hans Bertle. These illustrations have since then been used in translations, too, including the Dutch, French, and Swedish one. In total, the novel has been translated at least into 11 languages, and other illustrations have been created as well.

== Interpretation ==
As the other forest novels by Salten, also Fifteen Rabbits can be interpreted as an allegorical depiction of the diaspora of the Jewish people (interpretatio judaica). This was noted, among others, by Salten's archenemy Karl Kraus who mocked the "hares with the Jewish manner of speaking" (German: jüdelnde Hasen). The humans (called "He" by the animals) treat the animals in the forest like God in the Old Testament: both protecting and punishing. The discussions that Hops has with older hares may be modelled after the debates between youths and men that occur at a Talmud school; it is notable that the female hares do not take part in these dialogues. The subjects of these debates concern aspects that are central for the Jewish life in a diaspora: threats and persecution.

== See also ==
- Watership Down

== Selected editions ==
- Fünfzehn Hasen: Schicksale in Wald und Feld. Wien: Paul Zsolnay Verlag, 1929.
- Fifteen Rabbits. Translated by Whittaker Chambers. New York: Simon and Schuster, 1930.
- Fünfzehn Hasen: Schicksale in Wald und Feld. Mit zahlreichen Federzeichnungen von Hans Bertle. Zürich: Albert Müller, 1938.
- Fifteen Rabbits. Translated by Whittaker Chambers. Illustrated by Kurt Wiese. New York: Grosset & Dunlap, 1942.
- Fifteen Rabbits. Translated by Whittaker Chambers. Illustrated by Sheila Dunn. London: Commodore Press. 1943.
- Fifteen Rabbits: A Celebration of Life. Translated by Whittaker Chambers. Illustrated by John Freas. New York: Delacorte Press, 1976. ISBN 0-440-02563-X
- Fifteen Rabbits. Translated by Whittaker Chambers. New York: Aladdin, 2015. ISBN 978-1-4424-8755-0
