= Urho Toivola =

Finnish journalist, Member of Parliament and diplomat

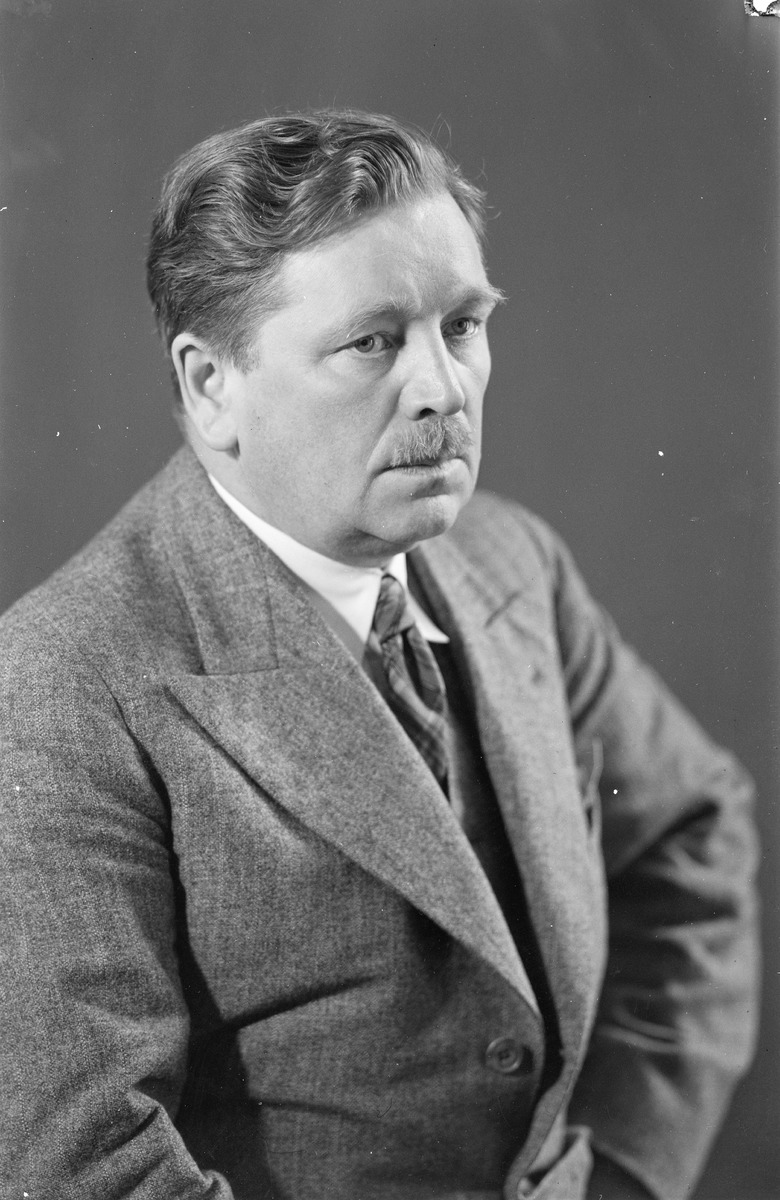
Toivola in 1938

Urho Vilpitön Konstantin Toivola (until 1906 Kröger; 17 October 1890 – 11 September 1960) was a Finnish journalist, Member of Parliament and a diplomat. He represented left-wing liberalism, so-called Jacobinism in the National Progressive Party.

== Early life ==
Toivola was born in Heinola. His parents were Reverend David Konstantin Kröger and Anni Koponen. He graduated from secondary school in 1909 and graduated with a Bachelor of Philosophy in 1914.

== Career ==
=== Journalist ===
Toivola worked as a journalist for Pohjanlahti magazine in Rauma and the Helsingin Sanomat newspaper in 1915. Toivola became Editor-in-Chief for Turun Sanomat from 1925 to 1937, in the Elanto newspaper from 1937 to 1938 and also in Le Nord magazine in 1938.

In 1930, as a member of a delegation of European journalists which also included Felix Salten, invited by the Carnegie Endowment for International Peace, he visited the United States and wrote a book on his journey, Aurinkoista Amerikkaa.

=== Politician ===
After holding positions such as party secretary in the Young Finnish Party, official in the National Food Authority and secretary both in the consumers' co-operative of Elanto and in the National Progressive Party,

In the early 1920s, Toivola served as Secretary at the Finnish Embassy in London from 1921 to 1922, and in the Finnish Embassy in Paris and as Finland's Representative at the League of Nations from 1922 to 1925 and was Secretary of the Finnish Delegation to the General Assembly in the League of Nations from 1922 to 1924.

After joining the Ministry for Foreign Affairs, Toivola was the Head of the Ministry's newspaper Department from 1938 to 1939, and Head of the Information Center in the Council of State in 1939 and Chargé d'Affaires of Finland to Oslo in 1940 and during the Continuation War as Counselor in Washington from 1941 to 1944.

After the war, Toivola served as Finnish Envoy to Ottawa from 1948 to 1952, and in Prague, and in Vienna from 1953 to 1957.

Toivola was Member of Parliament from 1933 to 1936 from the southern constituency of the Turku County. He was elector in several presidential elections in 1931, 1937 and 1940.

He was a member in the City Council of Turku and was a member of the Young Finnish Party's Central Committee and later member in the National Progressive Party's subcommittee.

== Personal life ==
Toivola married Lyyli Elisabeth (Rakel) Kansanen from 1913 to 1949. Ambassador Joel Toivola was their son. As a widower, Urho Toivola married a second time in 1951 to Rachel Ilona Kansanen who had a Bachelor of Philosophy degree.

He died in Helsinki, aged 69.
