= Bambi (character) =

Title character of Felix Salten's 1923 novel

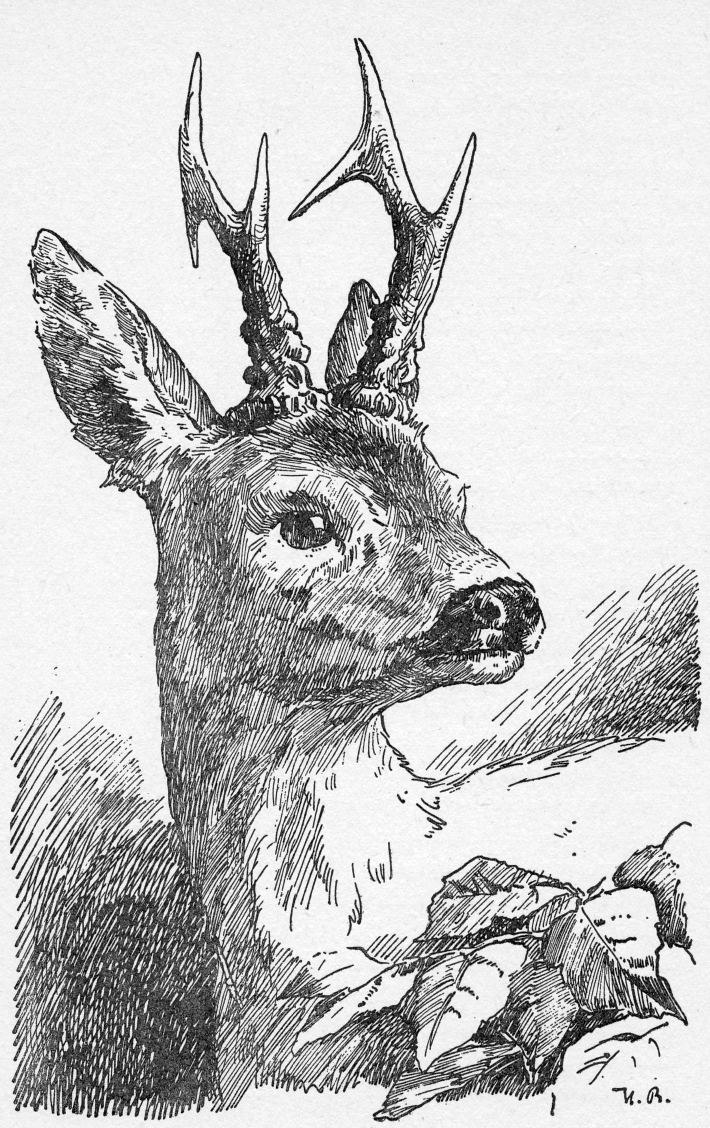
- Grown-up Bambi in Bambi's Children, as drawn by Hans Bertle
- First appearance: Bambi, a Life in the Woods
- Created by: Felix Salten
- Voiced by: Bobby Stewart (baby); Donnie Dunagan (young); Hardie Albright (adolescent); John Sutherland (young adult); (Bambi); Alexander Gould (Bambi II)
- Species: Roe deer (novels); White-tailed deer (films)
- Gender: Male
- Family: The Great Prince of the Forest (father); Unnamed mother (deceased)
- Spouse: Faline (mate)
- Children: Geno and Gurri (twins); Ferto

Bambi is the title character in Felix Salten's 1923 novel, Bambi, a Life in the Woods, and its sequel, Bambi's Children. The character also appears in Salten's novels Perri and Fifteen Rabbits.

Early German-language editions of the novels were illustrated by Hans Bertle. In the Disney film adaptations, Bambi's species was changed from a roe deer to a white-tailed deer, which would be more familiar to American audiences. His image is a Disney icon, comparable to the recognition of Jiminy Cricket or Tinker Bell, and he is even shown on Disney stock certificates.

== Adaptations ==
Bambi has appeared in multiple adaptations of Salten's books.

=== Disney version ===
==== Bambi (1942) ====
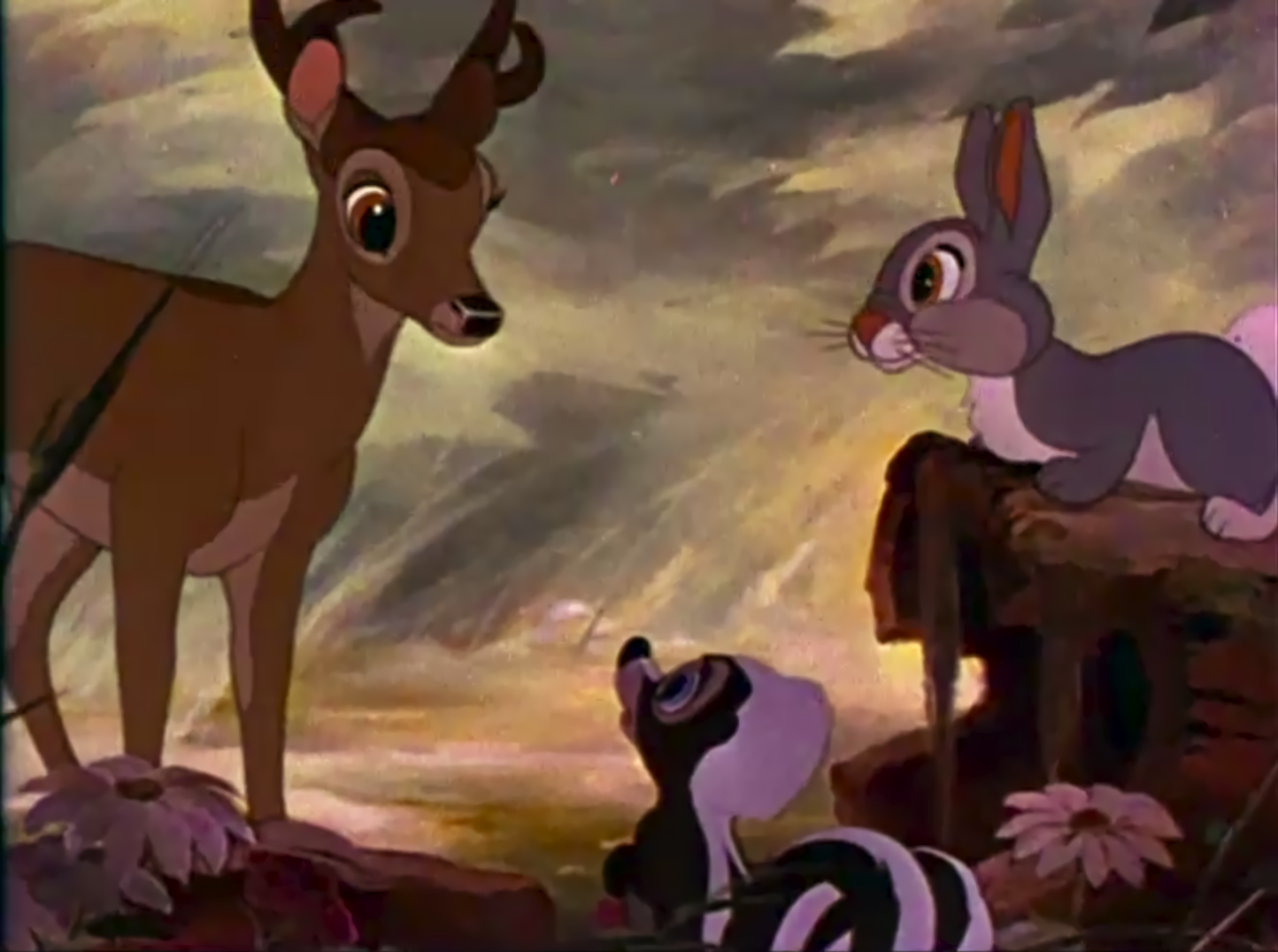
Adolescent Bambi, along with his friends Thumper (bunny) and Flower (skunk).

In Disney's first Bambi film, Bambi is not very strongly personalized to strengthen the environmental perspective of the film. Bambi, as with most of his friends, could be any deer in any forest. In his early youth, Bambi has wide eyes, spindly legs, a curious nature and high-pitched voice. As he grows, he gradually becomes more mature, but even in young adulthood, he seems a very young buck with a delicate build and a fairly naïve nature.

The naturalistic animation in the first film was helped by a pair of four-month-old fawns sent to the studio by Maine game wardens. However, human models were also used for one scene: actress Jane Randolph and Ice Capades star Donna Atwood acted as live-action references for the scene where Bambi and Thumper are on ice. Disney also had Rico LeBrun, a painter of animals, come to the studio to lecture on the structure and movement of animals. Nature photographer Maurice Day spent months in a forest in Maine, recording animals for the animators, as well.

==== Bambi II (2006) ====
In Bambi II, Bambi is much more distinctly personalized. In this film which fills in the gap between the death of his mother and when he was next shown as a young adult, Bambi finds himself faced with a number of challenges. First, there is the death of his mother and his consequential move to live with his father, the Great Prince of the Forest. His father is reluctant to learn to be a father. In addition, Bambi begins to fall in love with Faline, and comes into conflict with an older fawn called Ronno (the same deer he would later fight over Faline with as a young adult). Whereas in the first film he follows life wherever it led him, in this film he is more assertive in order to bond with and impress his father. In the first film, Bambi's status as the young prince had little impact on the flow of the story. In this film, his rank becomes a key part of the storyline as he sets out to prove to himself and others, most of all his father, demonstrating that he deserves to be prince and can live up to his father's name.

==== Other Disney media ====
Disney's version of the character has made several appearances in different media, like cameo appearances in the film Who Framed Roger Rabbit (1998), several episodes of the television series House of Mouse (2001–2003), or the short film Once Upon a Studio (2023). In video games, he appears as a character to summon in Kingdom Hearts, and as a playable character in Disney Magic Kingdoms.

=== Bambi Meets Godzilla (1969) ===
Bambi Meets Godzilla

Bambi appears in the 1969 parody film Bambi Meets Godzilla, in which he is killed by Godzilla.

=== Bambi's Childhood (1985) ===
Bambi is the protagonist of the Soviet film Bambi's Childhood. It is an adaptation of the 1923 novel.

=== Bambi: The Reckoning (2025) ===
On November 21, 2022, a live-action horror film titled Bambi: The Reckoning was announced to be in development by ITN Studios and Jagged Edge Productions with Scott Jeffrey directing and writing, and Rhys Frake-Waterfield serving as a producer. The film will be about Bambi getting revenge after the death of his mother. Jeffrey described the film as "an incredibly dark retelling of the 1928 story we all know and love. Finding inspiration from the design used in Netflix's The Ritual, Bambi will be a vicious killing machine that lurks in the wilderness."
