= Florian (film) =

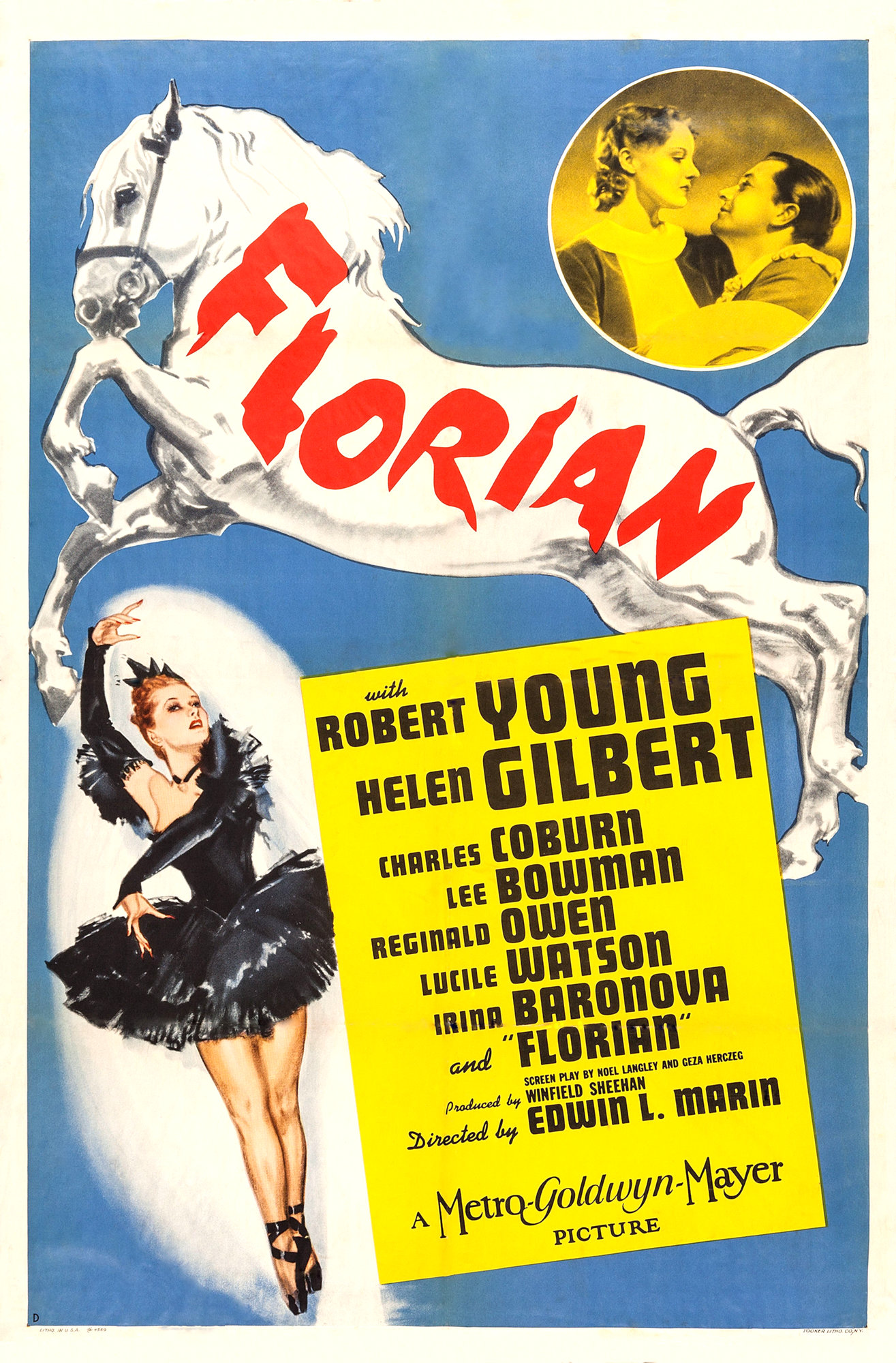
- Film poster
- Directed by: Edwin L. Marin; John E. Burch (assistant)
- Written by: Noel Langley; James Kevin McGuinness
- Based on: Florian by Felix Salten
- Produced by: Winfield R. Sheehan
- Starring: Robert Young; Helen Gilbert
- Cinematography: Karl Freund
- Edited by: Frank E. Hull
- Music by: Franz Waxman
- Production company: Metro-Goldwyn-Mayer
- Distributed by: Loews, Inc.
- Release date: June 5, 1940 (New York City)
- Running time: 91 minutes
- Country: United States
- Language: English

Florian is a 1940 American romantic drama film directed by Edwin L. Marin, and starring Robert Young and Helen Gilbert. It is loosely based on the novel Florian by Felix Salten.

== Plot ==
A young groom, Anton, has grown up in Austria a friend of the duchess, Diana, despite their differences in social class. Anton trains a gifted stallion, Florian, for her father, the emperor. Archduke Oliver is the intended husband for the emperor's daughter, but he is killed in battle.

When war ravages the country, Anton is able to assist Diana in crossing the Switzerland border to safety, but he is arrested on returning home. The horse, Florian, is sold to Max Borelli, a carnival worker from New York City who takes him there, then treats him abusively and eventually sells the horse for a fraction of its worth.

Anton is freed and, accompanied by Dr. Hofer, his veterinarian, travels to New York to begin a new life. While he is there, Anton manages to find Florian, return him to good health and make him the splendid horse he used to be. Diana becomes aware of their presence and all are happily reunited.

== Cast ==
- Robert Young as Anton Erban
- Helen Gilbert as Duchess Diana
- Charles Coburn as Dr. Johannes Hofer
- Lee Bowman as Archduke Oliver
- Reginald Owen as Emperor Franz Josef
- Lucile Watson as Countess
- Irina Baronova as Trina
- Rand Brooks as Victor
- S. Z. Sakall as Max
- William B. Davidson as Archduke Franz Ferdinand
- George Lloyd as Marco Borelli
- George Irving as Bantry
- Charles Judels as Editor
- Adrian Morris as Cpl. Ernst

== See also ==
- List of films about horses
