= Bambi's Children =

1940 novel by Felix Salten

- First English edition
- Author: Felix Salten
- Original title: Bambis Kinder: Eine Familie im Walde
- Translator: Barthold Fles
- Illustrator: Hans Bertle (Swiss edition); Erna Pinner (U.S. edition)
- Language: German
- Genre: Novel
- Publisher: Bobbs-Merrill (US); Albert Müller (Switzerland)
- Publication date: 1940
- Publication place: Switzerland
- English publication date: 1939
- Media type: Print (Hardback)
- Pages: 315
- OCLC: 225457
- LC Class: PZ10.3.S176 Bap10
- Preceded by: Bambi, a Life in the Woods

Bambi's Children: The Story of a Forest Family (German: Bambis Kinder: Eine Familie im Walde) is a 1939 coming-of-age novel written by Austrian author Felix Salten as a sequel to his 1923 work Bambi, a Life in the Woods.

== Background ==
The sequel to Bambi follows the lives of the twin children of Bambi and his mate and cousin Faline as they grow from fawns to young adults. Salten wrote the sequel while living in exile in Switzerland after being forced to flee Nazi-occupied Austria as he was of Jewish heritage. Written in German, the novel was first published in English in the United States in 1939 by Bobbs-Merrill. It was not published in German until the following year. Perri, a squirrel character from one of Salten's earlier novels, makes several appearances in the book.

The models for Geno and Gurri were Felix Salten's own children, Paul, who was careful and timid, and Anna Katharina, who was merry and optimistic. Salten also included himself as the responsible and humane hunter in the novel.

== Translation history ==
In the original German language, the content of Bambi's Children is more violent, even gorier than that of Bambi, a Life in the Woods, but violent depictions of killings and mutilated animals have been toned down or removed from the English translation so that its language appears gentler than that of Bambi.

Although the title page of the American edition claims that the English translation is "complete and unabridged," in reality it is somewhat abridged and greatly altered in tone and content; for instance, italicized wordplay has been added to the English edition. On the other hand, the 1977 Swedish translation, Bambis barn, is essentially abridged, without a mention of this in the book.

Felix Salten himself did not want to be identified as merely a children's author, and he opposed the changes his American publisher wanted to make in Bambi's Children, for instance to the section which depicts the mating season of the moose. He wrote to his American publisher:

At this time I beg you most urgently, quite apart from softenings, not to advertise my work as a children's book or to launch it otherwise in such a way.

Salten's original German text of Bambis Kinder does not have chapter divisions; the text is only divided into 22 unnumbered sections by blank lines. However, the English-language edition consists of 30 chapters, and the abridged Swedish edition only has 14 chapters.

Barthold Fles' English translation has also been released with illustrations by Phoebe Erickson (1976) and Richard Cowdrey (2014).

The 1945 Brazilian Portuguese translation, Os filhos de Bambi, and the 1946 French translation, Les Enfants de Bambi by Monique Yersin, use the illustrations by Hans Bertle. A shortened French-language edition was illustrated by Jeanne Hives after Walt Disney in 1959 and by Jacques Fromont in 1977. There are also a 1943 Spanish translation, Los hijos de Bambi: Historia de una familia del bosque, by Cayetano Romano, a 1950 Dutch translation Bambi's kinderen by Henk Cornelissen, and a 2016 Finnish translation, Bambin lapset: Perhe metsän siimeksessä. The Hungarian language can boast with three separate translations (1940, 1968, 1992) and the Slovak translation of 1947 by Emília Horanská was reprinted in 1968.

== Plot ==
Twin fawns Geno and Gurri learn the pleasures as well as downsides of nature and their forest home, as their mother Faline raises them to adulthood. Their father, Faline's cousin Bambi, watches over them and, at times, takes care of them while their mother is busy. During their lives, they interact with Lana and Boso, twin fawns of their Aunt Rolla.

One day, Gurri is attacked by a fox, but survives because a hunter shoots the fox at the last moment. She is then taken away by the hunter (known only as "he" by some of the animals; in the English translation, he is referred to as a gamekeeper, and the name has been changed to the "brown he" because of a brown coat he wears, but such detail is never mentioned in the German text) when she is brought to the "he's" place, she meets his dog, Hector and a European eagle-owl that He captured a while ago. The owl is kept in a cage, and he tells Gurri about the times when He uses him as a bait to attack crows and other birds of prey and shoots them. Then Bambi finds her, and he tells Gurri that he will come every night to teach her how to jump over the fence. But when "He" sees the tracks of Bambi in the corral, He sets Gurri free.

When she comes back, tensions between her family and Rolla's family start to rise. First, Rolla asks Gurri to tell her what had happened, but she doesn't want to talk because she thinks that she would not honor her miraculous salvation and Bambi's effort properly.

Then one day, Rolla gets attacked by a wolfdog, Nero. While trying to escape him, she accidentally lures the wolfdog to where Faline and the others are hiding. The wolfdog immediately turns his attention to Geno, and chases him instead. When Faline sees Geno disappear, she blames Rolla for "sacrificing" her son. After Bambi saves Geno from the wolfdog, Geno finds Rolla, and he is then reunited with his sister and mother. When they see Rolla, Gurri gives her a warm welcome, while Boso starts developing a grudge against them. He starts antagonizing Geno, claiming that his ordeal was greater. When Faline and her children leave, a feud between the two families is started.

When Geno starts to grow his antlers, he and Gurri discover two orphaned male fawns named Nello and Membo. Faline decides to adopt them as new friends for her children, so they can forget about their new enemies. When Geno gets older, he meets Lana again. Boso comes out and challenges Geno to a fight, but Geno refuses. Boso starts to call Geno a coward. Only at a third encounter, when Geno thinks no witnesses are around to see Boso humiliated, he fights Boso and defeats him; he offers a truce, but Boso instead turns away.

One day, Boso is shot by a boy hunter, but before the boy can kill him he escapes. He then runs into Bambi and Bambi has him use the same techniques that his father, the Old Prince, told him to use when he got wounded. The boy later returns to the meadow and tries to kill a deer from a pack, thinking that Faline and Rolla are bucks. But right when he is about to shoot, Bambi jumps out and charges him down.

In the end, the two families end their feud and become friends again. At the end, Faline lets her children go their own paths. On the final page, she appears to the meadow with a newborn fawn, Ferto (this sequence, among others, is missing from the English edition).

== Dell comic ==
Although this story was never made into a film, Dell Comics published a Walt Disney Production comics adaptation in 1943.
