= Bar Kokhba Society =

The Cairo Bar-Kochba Zionist Society (1897–1904) was the first Zionist organization in Egypt and in the Islamic world. It was founded in 1897 by Joseph Marco Barukh, a Zionist activist from Istanbul who arrived in Egypt in 1896. It was the focal point of Zionist activity in Egypt at the turn of the 20th century. It was dissolved in 1906.

== History ==
Upon arriving in Egypt July 1896, Joseph Marco Barukh founded a Zionist circle with two local businessmen: Jacques Harmalin and Joseph Leibovitch. After some months, it became the Bar Kokhba Society, established with 30 founding members.

Its elected council was led by Jacques Harmalin and it was composed entirely of Ashkenazi Jews of Egypt's middle and lower classes. Its early attempts to recruit non-Ashkenazi members were unsuccessful. In November 1900, it opened a Zionist school in which 100 students learned Hebrew in addition to the curriculum set by the Egyptian government. It also established Bene Zion, a youth group for those at least 15 years old. Although the school closed in the summer of 1902 for financial reasons, the membership of Bar Kokhba increased from 60 in 1900 to 300 members in 1901, including Arabic-speaking and Ladino-speaking Jews. The Bar Kokhba Society also sold the Zionist shekel, and at its height it had branches in Alexandria, Tanta, Mansura, and Suez. Members of the branch in Alexandria were mostly middle-class Sephardim, and the branch was supported by the Chief Rabbi of Alexandria.

In 1901, the Bar Kokhba Society encouraged Egyptian Jews to seek Italian or British nationality.

According to the Encyclopedia of Jews in the Islamic World, the Bar Kokhba Society lasted until 1904. According to Bat Ye'or (Gisèle Littman), the Bar Kokhba Society was dissolved in 1906, "destroyed by internal wranglings".
