= The Hound of Florence =

Book by Felix Saten

- Cover of the American edition.
- Author: Felix Salten
- Original title: Der Hund von Florenz
- Translator: Huntley Paterson
- Illustrator: Kurt Wiese
- Language: German
- Genre: novel
- Publisher: Simon and Schuster
- Publication date: 1923
- Publication place: Austria
- English publication date: 1930
- Pages: 237
- OCLC: 1826868

The Hound of Florence: A Novel (German: Der Hund von Florenz) is a 1923 novel written by Felix Salten. The novel was first translated into English in 1930 by Huntley Paterson, and the translation has illustrations by Kurt Wiese.

== Plot ==
The Hound of Florence is an adventure story for young readers, set in early eighteenth-century Austria and Italy. The adolescent Lukas Grassi has lost his parents and lives in Vienna in great poverty, longs for his native Italy, and would like to study art in Florence. By magic, his wish is granted, but every other day he must take the form of a dog, Kambyses, that belongs to the Archduke Ludwig; and, alternating daily between human and canine form, he travels from Vienna to Florence, along with the Archduke's troops, where he has to lead a unique double life. This is the only book of Salten in which supernatural elements occur, and they may show influence of E. T. A. Hoffmann.

The ending of the book differs greatly in the original language and in the English translation. The German-language version ends in tragedy: the archduke stabs the dog to death with a dagger, killing Lukas, and his body is disposed of. In the English translation, a wholly new ending of six more pages has been written: Lukas survives, gets medication and is united with the courtesan. It is not known if the alternative ending is authorized.

== Background ==
The book has some "overtly" autobiographical background. In the 1890s, the journalist Salten had become a friend and confidant of the Austrian archduke Leopold Ferdinand, and in his novel, Salten makes use of his experiences with the archduke and his brothers. He carried the material for twenty-five years before he dared to write the story. In 1907, he mentioned to Arthur Schnitzler that he was then about to finish the manuscript. However, it was not until 1921 when the manuscript was completed.

Certain recurring motifs in Salten's œuvre appear also in this book: the deep cleavage between the very rich and the very poor, and a critique of the nobility.

According to Salten's biographer Beverley Driver Eddy, the strength of The Hound of Florence lies in the depiction of the dog Kambyses – a "brilliant portrayal of a dog's character". Salten himself was a passionate dog lover and kept dogs most of his life.

The Hound of Florence is written as one piece. There are no chapter divisions, but the 1920s German-language editions, set in Fraktur, use an embellished dash to divide the text into large sections. A 1980s edition uses asterisks for that purpose.

== Availability ==
In the German-language area, The Hound of Florence was Salten’s second biggest success, only surpassed by Bambi, with three editions (1923, 1928, 1944) during the lifetime of the author, and several reprints since then.

Since 1930, the English-language edition of The Hound of Florence was out of print for a long time. Only in 2014 was a new edition published, this time illustrated by Richard Cowdrey, using the alternative ending. The novel was translated into French in 1952. The Finnish-language edition from 2016 includes both endings.

== Legacy ==
The novel was the inspiration for the films The Shaggy Dog (1959), The Shaggy D.A. (1976), The Return of the Shaggy Dog (1987), The Shaggy Dog (1994), and The Shaggy Dog (2006).
