= Walter Linsenmaier =

Swiss artist and entomologist (1917–2000)

Walter Linsenmaier (18 August 1917 – 31 October 2000) was a Swiss artist and entomologist. He was particularly known for his highly detailed illustrations of animals, plants, and insects which were widely published in magazines and books. He was also one of the 20th century's most important experts on the cuckoo wasp family (Chrysididae) and described over 600 new species and subspecies of these insects. Linsenmaier was awarded an Honorary Doctorate from the University of Bern in 1982 in recognition of his scientific and artistic achievements and the Ernst Jünger Prize for Entomology from the State of Baden-Württemberg in 1992.

Linsenmaier was born in Stuttgart, Germany, but his family moved to Switzerland when he was only a year old. He initially worked as stuccoist, the same trade as his father. He then earned a teaching degree in drawing and illustration from the Lucerne University of Applied Sciences and Arts and became a professional illustrator specialising in nature illustrations. He wrote and illustrated several books, the most famous of which, Insects of the World with 1,888 illustrations, was published in 1972. In 1951 Linsenmaier and his father, who was also a talented taxidermist, established the Tierweltpanorama, a private museum with over 800 taxidermied animals from around the world displayed in their natural habitats. Linsenmaier died in Ebikon at the age of 83.
