= Perri (novel) =

1938 novel by Felix Salten

- The first U.K. edition had an introduction by Beverley Nichols. The first U.S. edition had a foreword by Donald Culross Peattie.
- Author: Felix Salten
- Original title: Die Jugend des Eichhörnchens Perri
- Translator: Barrows Mussey
- Illustrator: Ludwig Heinrich Jungnickel
- Publisher: Bobbs-Merrill Company (US); Jonathan Cape (UK)
- Publication date: 1938
- Pages: 228

Perri: The Youth of a Squirrel (German: Die Jugend des Eichhörnchens Perri) is a 1938 novel by Felix Salten, author of the 1923 novel Bambi, a Life in the Woods, and is a follow-up to that book. Its title character is a Eurasian red squirrel. Bambi makes a brief appearance in Perri.

The novel was first published in English translation in 1938 because the first German-language edition printed in Vienna was confiscated and destroyed by the Nazis in 1938. In 1942 the German language version was fully published by Albert Müller in Zürich, illustrated by Hans Bertle. Before a successful German-language release, the book was translated also into Hungarian in 1938, into Danish in 1939 and into Swedish in 1940; a French translation followed in 1943, a Slovak one in 1947 and a Dutch one in 1952.

In 1957, Walt Disney adapted it into a True Life Fantasy of the same name.

== Plot ==
The story begins with a human child named Annerle saving Perri's mother from a marten. Afterwards Perri goes off searching for her mother, when she is then attacked by a crow, but is later saved by her mother. Later on, Perri's mother takes her to another part of the forest, where she meets the black squirrel, Mirro, and her playmate, Porro. Through the course of the novel, Porro begins to wonder about love.

Later on, he and Perri witness Bambi trying to keep a buck from being lured by He (the animals term for man). Later on, a red squirrel named Flame-Red comes to the forest, telling everyone his story about how he was captured by He, but later escaped. Everyone but Mirro and Porro believes him. Porro even tries to prove that his story is a lie, even going to see Annerle to ask her if it were true. Around that time, Perri begins to miss her mother, so she ask Annerle if she has seen her, but to no avail. It is then revealed to the reader that her mother was killed by an unknown predator.

Later on, Perri's oak tree is chopped down by He, so she and Porro search for new homes. Perri grows up and starts developing feelings for Porro. While she searches for him, Mirro tries to make her his mate, but is rebuffed. When she finds Porro, he confesses his love for her. But Mirro brutally attacks Porro, and right when he is about to claim Perri, Flame-Red attacks Mirro for Perri, as well. While they are fighting, Porro and Perri run away together to another forest.

After years of never seeing Annerle, Porro and Perri decide to revisit the forest. When they arrive, they noticed that Annerle has grown up and no longer understands what they're saying. When she tries to pet one of them, Porro and Perri run back to the forest, vowing never to return.
