= The Shaggy Dog (1994 film) =

1994 American fantasy-comedy film

- Promotional image
- Genre: Fantasy; Comedy
- Based on: The Shaggy Dog by; Bill Walsh; Lillie Hayward; Characters from The Hound of Florence by Felix Salten
- Teleplay by: Bill Walsh; Lillie Hayward; Tim Doyle
- Directed by: Dennis Dugan
- Starring: Scott Weinger; Ed Begley Jr.
- Music by: Denis M. Hannigan
- Country of origin: United States
- Original language: English

Production
- Executive producer: Scott Immergut; Les Mayfield; George Zaloom
- Producer: Joseph B. Wallenstein
- Cinematography: Russ T. Alsobrook
- Editor: Jeff Gourson
- Running time: 96 minutes
- Production company: ZM Productions; Walt Disney Television

Original release
- Network: ABC
- Release: November 12, 1994

The Shaggy Dog is a 1994 American made-for-television fantasy-comedy film and a remake of the 1959 film of the same name produced by Walt Disney Television that premiered on November 12, 1994 as an ABC Family Movie. It is the first in a series of four remakes of Disney live-action films produced for broadcast on ABC during the 1994–95 television season, the other three being The Computer Wore Tennis Shoes, Escape to Witch Mountain, and Freaky Friday.

== Plot ==
Preteen Martin "Moochie" Daniels wants a dog, but his dad, Ron, is allergic to canines, like Bundles, the Old English Sheepdog of neighbor Charlie Mulvihill & his niece Francesca, who secretly trained his pet to help him steal jewels. Mooch's big brother Wilbur "Wilby" is a promising inventor, but clumsy when it comes to girls, and is jealous of his mate Trey who has no problems. Desperate Wilby cast a spell on himself (he accidentally got from dad's museum of curiosities), which transforms him into Bundles the Shaggy Dog. He would have back and forward transformations at uncontrollable times. This is how he also knows that the diamond on loan in his father's museum is Charlie's next target.

== Cast ==
- Scott Weinger as Wilbur "Wilby" Daniels/The Shaggy Dog
- Ed Begley Jr. as Ronald "Ron" Daniels
- Sharon Lawrence as Monica Daniels
- Jordan Warkol as Martin "Moochie" Daniels
- Jon Polito as Detective Al
- James Cromwell as Charlie "the Robber" Mulvihill
- Jeremy Sisto as Trey Miller
- Sarah Lassez as Francesca
- Natasha Gregson Wagner as Allison
- Bobby Slayton as Coach Evans
- Rick Ducommun as Officer Kelly
- David Pasquesi as Officer Hanson
