= Paul Zsolnay =

Paul Zsolnay, also known as Paul von Zsolnay, ((June 12, 1895, Budapest – May 13, 1961, Vienna) was a publisher and art collector persecuted by the Nazis due to his Jewish heritage.

== Life ==
Paul von Zsolnay was born in Budapest in 1895, the first son of the tobacco industrialist and Austrian Consul General Adolf von Zsolnay (1866–1932) and his wife, Klara Amanda—known as "Andy"—née Wallerstein (1876–1956). His brother, Friedrich ("Fritz"), was born in Bad Ischl less than a year later. In 1901, the family withdrew from the Jewish Community in Vienna and joined the Evangelical Church (Augsburg Confession). After studying agriculture at the University of Natural Resources and Life Sciences in Vienna, Paul Zsolnay managed the family estate in Oberufer, near Pressburg (Bratislava).

== Paul Zsolnay Verlag ==
In 1923, he founded the Paul Zsolnay Verlag (publishing house), headquartered at Prinz Eugen-Straße 30 in Vienna’s 4th district. In 1929, he secretly married the sculptor Anna Mahler (1904–1988) in Paris. Their home at Maxingstraße 24 in Vienna’s 13th district which they called "Kaunitzschlössel," became a venue for literary salons. Their daughter, Alma, was born on October 5, 1930.

== Art collection ==
Paul and Anna Zsolnay divorced in 1935. Alma with Paul, and her grandmother, Andy Zsolnay. Andy's husand Adolf Zsolnay had died in 1932, bequeathing his collection of ancient art—consisting of stone figures, heads, statues, reliefs, jewelry, and coins—with one-quarter going to his wife and three-eighths each to his sons, Paul and Fritz Zsolnay. A collection of Coptic textiles, which Adolf Zsolnay had placed in the care of the Egyptian-Oriental Collection at the Kunsthistorisches Museum (KHM) in Vienna in 1931, remained there following his death.

== Nazi persecution and exile ==
After Austria's merging with Nazi Germany in 1938, the Zsolnays were persecuted due to their Jewish heritage. Like all Jews, they were obliged by the Nazis antisemitic racial laws to submit declarations of assets. In July 1938, Paul Zsolnay’s share of the art collection was valued at approximately 10,000 Reichsmarks, while his mother’s jewelry and art objects were valued at approximately 57,000 Reichsmarks. In the autumn of 1938, Paul Zsolnay fled to London; his mother and daughter followed in the spring of 1939, traveling via Czechoslovakia. His brother, Fritz Zsolnay was imprisonned, released and fled first to Budapest, then to Switzerland, and later to England.

On 14 November 1938, Andy and Paul Zsolnay applied for permission to export to Hungary 24 carpets, 48 antique figurines and reliefs, and nine paintings, which were being stored at the Caro & Jellinek shipping company in Vienna. In May and June 1939, the Central Office for Monument Protection arranged for the confiscation, by Department 50 of the Vienna Municipal Administration, of two ancient terracotta simas (gutter elements), a funerary relief, and a panel painting from the removal storage facility. Subsequently, the confiscation was extended to include the artworks and furnishings that had remained in the villa. These items were subsequently designated for sale by Bernhard Witke, who had been appointed trustee by the Office for Property Transactions at the end of 1939. In 1940, the Kunsthistorisches Museum (KHM) acquired approximately 20 objects from the Zsolnay collection and entered them into the inventories of its Collection of Classical Antiquities and Egyptian and Near Eastern Collection. Books and manuscripts were transferred to the National Library; other objects went to Baldur von Schirach, were earmarked for the Art Museum in Linz, were to be sold through the Dorotheum auction house, or remained in the storage facilities of the Monument Protection Office.

In June 1938, the Paul Zsolnay Verlag publishing house was "Aryanized" by Jantsch-Streerbach and Hannes Dietl, a member of the Nazi Party.

== Postwar restitution claims ==
After the end of the war, Paul Zsolnay returned to Vienna to take back control of his publishing house. In 1947/48, Paul, Fritz, and Andy Zsolnay applied for the restitution of their art collection, which had been dispersed across Munich, Altaussee, and Vienna. At the same time as the restitution proceedings were underway, the KHM sought to acquire the funerary relief and the two simas for its Collection of Classical Antiquities and to retain one of the Coptic textiles in recognition of its long-term safekeeping of the textile collection. In fact, in 1948, the Egyptian and Near Eastern Collection received a piece of linen with a figurative insert as a gift.

In 1949, 233 Greek coins, 26 Roman coins, and 28 other coins, two scarabs, a number of pieces of jewellery, a panel painting depicting the Madonna and Child, and several original manuscripts were restituted to London. The three ancient objects, which had been exempt from the granting of an export permit since 1947, were finally purchased by the KHM in 1951. On the basis of the close chronological and substantive connection between the acquisition of objects that were, in principle, subject to restitution and the Export Prohibition Act—a connection established through systematic provenance research—the Art Restitution Advisory Board recommended in 2014 that the funerary relief and the two simas be returned by the KHM to the legal successors of Andy, Friedrich, and Paul Zsolnay. It did not, however, recommend the restitution of the Coptic textile.

== See also ==
The Holocaust in Austria

Aryanization
