= Renni the Rescuer =

1940 novel by Felix Salton

Renni the Rescuer: A Dog of the Battlefield
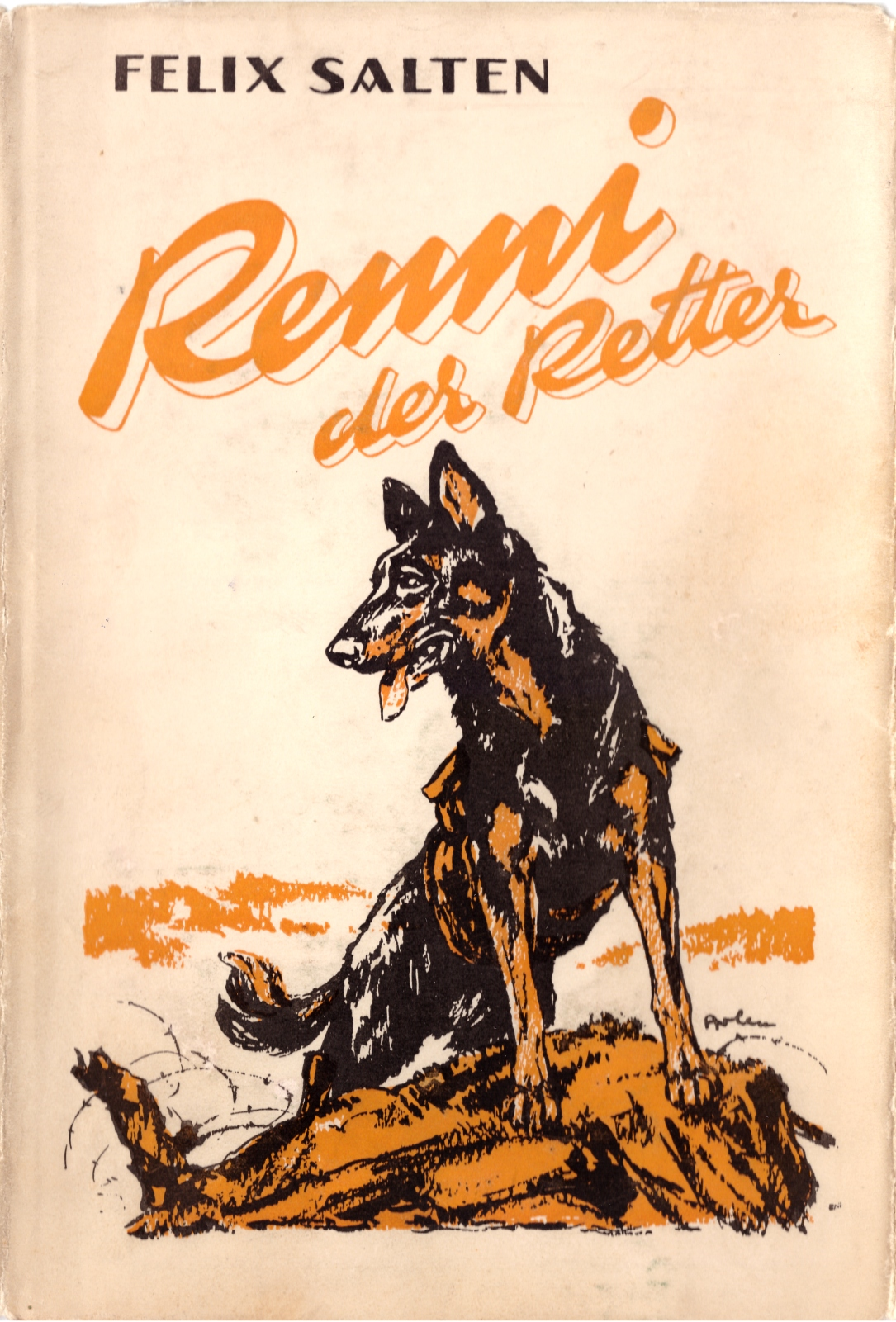
- Cover of the 1941 Swiss edition.
- Author: Felix Salten
- Original title: Renni der Retter: Das Leben eines Kriegshundes
- Translator: Kenneth C. Kaufman
- Illustrator: Philipp Arlen (Swiss ed.); Diana Thorne (U.S. ed.)
- Language: German
- Genre: novel
- Published: 1941
- Publisher: The Bobbs-Merril Company
- Publication place: Switzerland
- English publication date: 1940
- Pages: 326
- LC Class: PZ3.S1733

Renni the Rescuer: A Dog of the Battlefield (German original: Renni der Retter: Das Leben eines Kriegshundes) is a 1940 war novel by Felix Salten, describing the career of a military working dog called Renni, a German Shepherd dog, and his master, Georg.

Although the book is a work of fiction, Salten did some research for it: he was allowed to follow the dog training of the Swiss army. The story is set to an unspecific German-language country, and the German-language edition opens with a note:

The occurrences depicted in this book take place in an imaginary country. Therefore also the war events are merely imaginary shadows of a tragic reality.

This note is missing from the English-language edition; on the other hand, the English edition has additional references to Europe, missing from the German version.

Renni the Rescuer was published in English translation in 1940 in the United States, and the original German-language edition was published in Switzerland only in 1941. The English translation is longer than the published German-language edition because Salten's Swiss publisher removed some sequences that were considered weak. The most remarkable omissions are the following:

1. A conversation between the working dogs about the essence of war.
2. The subplot with the traumatized carrier pigeon has been removed altogether.

On the other hand, the death scene of a war horse, which takes a page in the German-language edition, has been reduced into nine lines in the English translation. Also some references to alcoholic beverages have been removed from the English translation.

The U.S. edition was illustrated by Diana Thorne and the Swiss edition by Philipp Arlen.

The novel is divided in three parts. The first part tells about Renni's childhood and youth. The second part describes the education of Renni as a combat search and rescue dog and his first triumph at a war manoeuvre. The final part takes the main characters to a full-scale war where they become a seamless unit. At the end, both are wounded so that they have to be released from duty. Although the book is labeled as a biography (Das Leben), it does not end with the death of the protagonist — it merely recounts the whole story of Renni's career as a military working dog. The English-language edition adds chapter division to the book, totalling 30 chapters.

The main human character of the novel is Georg Hauser, a young farmer of his late twenties and a reservist, Corporal. He is an ideal dog-owner who wants to train his dog without beating or even talking harshly to it. A contrast to Georg is Karl Stefanus who owns Renni's brother Pasha and who beats his dog constantly and finally shoots the poor animal to death.

Other subsidiary characters include Georg's mother Maria; Bettina, a service girl; Augustin Flamingo, a deceived husband; the Russian family Safonov with their six children; and Voggenberger who raises dogs.

In the English translation, several proper names have been modified:

German-language edition	English-language edition
Georg Hauser	George
Frau Maria	Mother Marie
Voggenberger	Vogg
Bettina Hoffmann	Bettina Holman
Mauz	Kitty
Ruprecht, Kaspar and Andreas Pfeifer	Ruprecht, Andrew and Rolf Fifer
Augustin Flamingo	Antony Flamingo
Jungnickel	Nickel
Viertaler	Wier
Pramper	Marly
Gronowetter	Greenow
Seidler	Karger

Renni the Rescuer was reprinted in 2013, without illustrations. The novel has also been translated at least into Hungarian in 1941, French in 1943, Spanish in 1943, Swedish in 1944, Slovak in 1947, and Finnish in 2016, most with illustrations by Philipp Arlen.
