= Paul Zsolnay Verlag =

Austrian publishing company

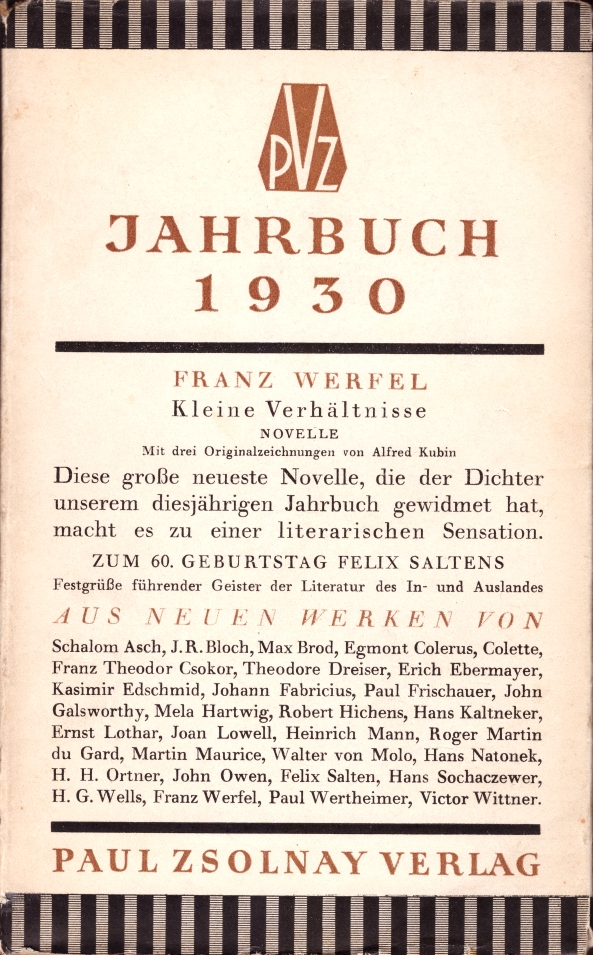
In the 1920s and 1930s, Paul Zsolnay Verlag published yearbooks containing new pieces, excerpts from the catalogue, felicitations, and other material.

Paul Zsolnay Verlag is an Austrian publishing company.

== Overview ==
The company was created in 1923 by Paul Zsolnay. It was the most successful publishing company during the interwar period, publishing authors such as John Galsworthy, H. G. Wells, Pearl S. Buck, A. J. Cronin, Franz Werfel, Felix Salten, Robert Neumann, Roda Roda, Hilde Spiel, Ernst Lothar, Mela Spira Hartwig, Hans Kaltneker, Friedrich Torberg, Leo Perutz, Heinrich Mann, Kasimir Edschmid, Carl Sternheim, Emil Ludwig, Walter von Molo, and Frank Thiess.

== Nazi era ==
After Austria's Anschluss with Nazi Germany in 1938, the publishing house's owner, Paul Zsolnay, was subject to Nazi anti-Jewish restrictions. After initial attempts to "trick" the Nazis by utilizing an “Aryan” titular head to his firm, he fled to London. The Gestapo closed the publishing house in April 1939, until the non-Jewish bookseller Karl H. Bischoff took over.

In London, Zsolnay worked for the British publisher Heinemann, helping to set up the imprint Heinemann & Zsolnay. Paul Zsolnay lived in England from 1938 to 1946.

== Postwar ==
When Zsolnay returned to Vienna in 1946, he recovered the business and renamed it the Heinemann & Zsolnay Verlag,
