= Felix Salten =

Austro-Hungarian Jewish author and literary critic (1869–1945)

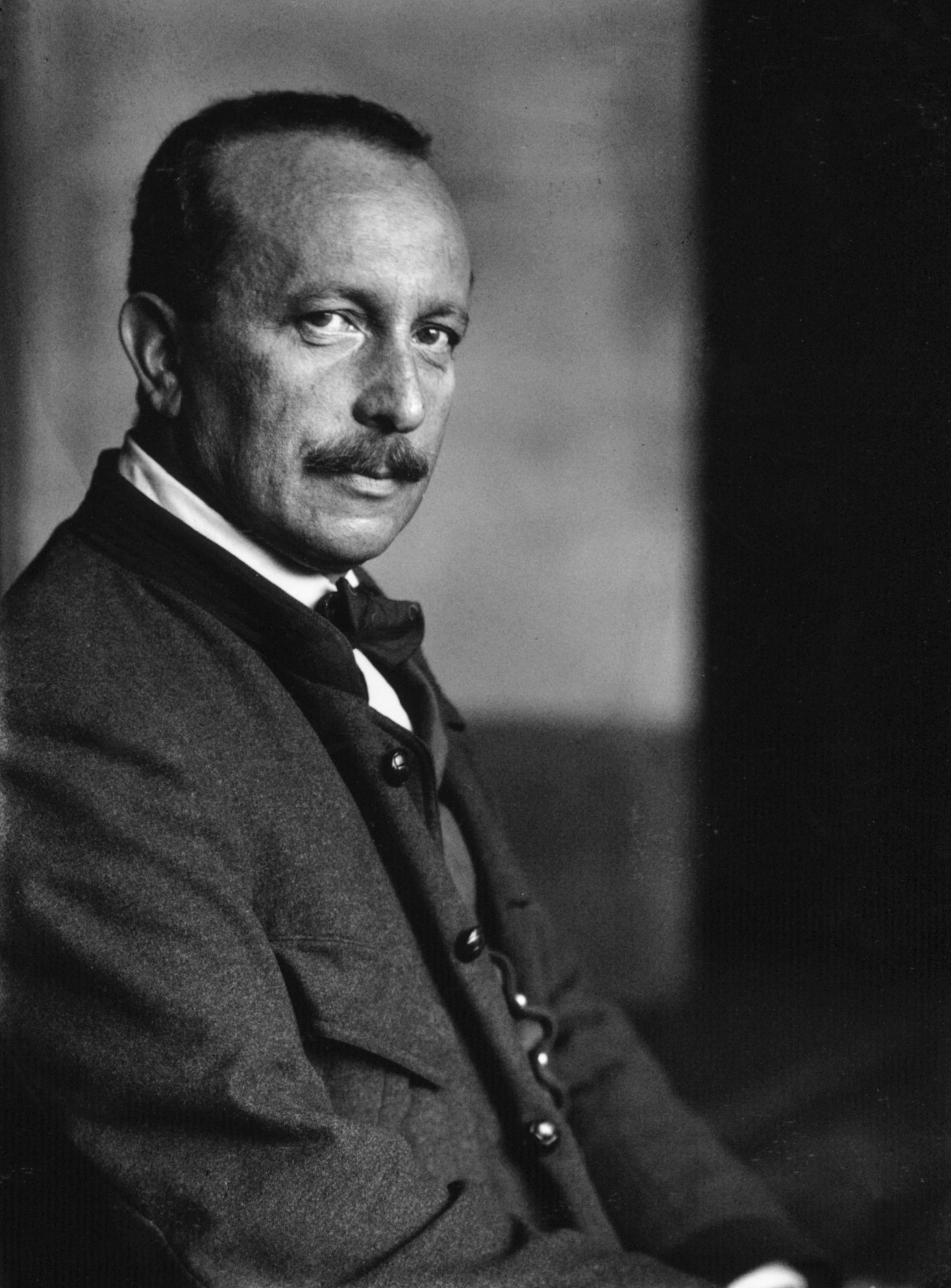
- Salten c. 1910
- Born: Siegmund Salzmann; 6 September 1869; Pest, Austria-Hungary
- Died: 8 October 1945 (aged 76); Zürich, Switzerland
- Resting place: Unterer Friesenberg Cemetery
- Occupation: Writer
- Spouse: Ottilie Metzl
- Children: 2
- Relatives: Hans Rehmann (son-in-law)
- Writing career
- Notable works: The Hound of Florence; Bambi, a Life in the Woods; Bambi's Children

Felix Salten (German: [ˈzaltn̩]; born Siegmund Salzmann; 6 September 1869 – 8 October 1945) was an Austrian author and literary critic. His most famous work is Bambi, a Life in the Woods, which was adapted into an animated feature film, Bambi, by Walt Disney Productions in 1942.

== Early life ==
Salten was born Siegmund Salzmann on 6 September 1869 in Pest, Austria-Hungary to an Austrian-Jewish family. His father was Fülöp Salzmann, the telegraph office's clerk in Pest; his mother was Maria Singer. He was the grandson of an Orthodox rabbi. When he was four weeks old, his family relocated to Vienna, as many Jews did after the Imperial government had granted full citizenship rights to Jews in 1867.

As a teen, Felix changed his name to Salten in order to appear less Jewish, and considered converting to Catholicism due to the antisemitism he experienced from his Austrian neighbors and schoolmates. When his father went bankrupt, the sixteen-year-old Salten quit school and began working for an insurance agency.

== Literary career ==
Salten then became part of the "Young Vienna" movement (Jung-Wien) and soon received work as a full-time art and theater critic for Vienna's press (Wiener Allgemeine Zeitung, Zeit). In 1900, he published his first collection of short stories. In 1901, he initiated Vienna's first, short-lived literary cabaret Jung-Wiener Theater Zum lieben Augustin.

He was soon publishing, on an average, one book a year, of plays, short stories, novels, travel books, and essay collections. He also wrote for nearly all the major newspapers of Vienna. In 1906, Salten went to Ullstein as an editor in chief of the B.Z. am Mittag and the Berliner Morgenpost, but relocated to Vienna some months later. He wrote also film scripts and librettos for operettas. In 1927 he became president of the Austrian P.E.N. club as successor of Arthur Schnitzler.

His best remembered work is Bambi (1923). Kathryn Schulz of The New Yorker stated that Bambi "rendered Salten famous". A translation in English was published by Simon & Schuster in 1928, and became a Book-of-the-Month Club success. In 1933, he sold the film rights to the American director Sidney Franklin for only $1,000, and Franklin later transferred the rights to the Walt Disney Studios, which formed the basis of the animated film Bambi (1942). The film became far more prominent than the book, and Schulz commented that this meant that as a result it "rendered [Salten] virtually unknown" and that it also made the original novel "obscure".

Life in Austria became perilous for Jews during the 1930s. In Germany, Adolf Hitler had Salten's books banned in 1936. Two years later, after Germany's annexation of Austria, Salten moved to Zürich, Switzerland, with his wife, and spent his final years there. Salten died on 8 October 1945, at the age of 76. He is buried at Israelitischer Friedhof Unterer Friesenberg.

Salten is now considered the probable author of a successful erotic novel, Josephine Mutzenbacher: The Life Story of a Viennese Whore, as Told by Herself published anonymously in 1906, filled with social criticism.

== Zionism ==
Inspired by fellow Austrian Jew Theodor Herzl, Salten became an outspoken advocate for the Zionist movement, which appealed to Salten's sense of self-empowerment. Salten anonymously wrote a column for Herzl's newspaper Die Welt, published a lengthy profile of Herzl after his 1904 death, and spoke at events sponsored by the Bar Kochba Society alongside Martin Buber.

== Personal life ==
Salten married actress Ottilie Metzl (1868–1942) in 1902, and had two children: Paul (1903–1937) and Anna Katharina (1904–1977), who married Swiss actor Hans Rehmann. He composed another book based on the character of Bambi, titled Bambi’s Children: The Story of a Forest Family (1939). His stories Perri and The Hound of Florence inspired the Disney films Perri (1957) and The Shaggy Dog (1959), respectively.

Salten was an avid hunter.

== Selected works ==
- 1899 – Der Gemeine
- 1906 – Josephine Mutzenbacher, authorship assumed – in German: Josefine Mutzenbacher oder Die Geschichte einer Wienerischen Dirne von ihr selbst erzählt (Vienna: Privatdruck [Fritz Freund], 1906)
- 1907 – Herr Wenzel auf Rehberg und sein Knecht Kaspar Dinckel
- 1910 – Olga Frohgemuth
- 1911 – Der Wurstelprater
- 1922 – Das Burgtheater
- 1923 – Der Hund von Florenz; English translation by Huntley Paterson, illustrated by Kurt Wiese, The Hound of Florence (Simon & Schuster, 1930), OCLC 1826868
- 1923 – Bambi: Eine Lebensgeschichte aus dem Walde; English transl. Whittaker Chambers, illus. Kurt Wiese, foreword John Galsworthy, as Bambi, a Life in the Woods (US: Simon & Schuster, 1928, OCLC 69170544; UK: Jonathan Cape, June/July 1928, OCLC 8454451); re-illustrated by Barbara Cooney (S&S, 1970), OCLC 824177272
- 1925 – Neue Menschen auf alter Erde: Eine Palästinafahrt
- 1927 – Martin Overbeck: Der Roman eines reichen jungen Mannes
- 1929 – Fünfzehn Hasen: Schicksale in Wald und Feld; English transl. Whittaker Chambers, as Fifteen Rabbits (US: Simon & Schuster, 1930, OCLC 1050794154); revised and enlarged (New York : Grosset & Dunlap, 1942, illus. Kurt Wiese), OCLC 4026552)
- 1931 – Freunde aus aller Welt: Roman eines zoologischen Gartens; English transl. Whittaker Chambers, illus. Kurt Wiese, as The City Jungle (US: Simon & Schuster, 1932, OCLC 2079025)
- 1931 – Fünf Minuten Amerika
- 1933 – Florian: Das Pferd des Kaisers; transl. Erich Posselt and Michel Kraike, Florian: The Emperor’s Stallion (Bobbs-Merrill, 1934), OCLC 8990860
- 1938 – Perri; German, Die Jugend des Eichhörnchens Perri
- 1939 – Bambi's Children, English translation (Bobbs-Merrill); German original, Bambis Kinder: Eine Familie im Walde (1940)
- 1940 – Renni the Rescuer
- 1942 – A Forest World
- 1945 – Djibi, the Kitten, illus. Walter Linsenmaier; U.S. transl., Jibby the Cat (Messner, 1948)

== Selected filmography ==
- Doctor Schotte (1918)
- Modern Marriages (1924)
- Comedians (1925)
- Storm in a Water Glass (1931)
- Poor as a Church Mouse (1931)
- Scampolo (1932)
- The Empress and I (1933)
- The Only Girl (1933)

=== Adaptations ===
- Florian (1940)
- Bambi (1942)
- Perri (1957)
- The Shaggy Dog (1959)

== See also ==
- Exilliteratur
- List of Austrian writers
- Fable
- Salzmann

== Sources ==
- Eddy, Beverley Driver: Felix Salten: Man of Many Faces. Riverside (Ca.): Ariadne Press, 2010. ISBN 978-1-57241-169-2.
- Seibert, Ernst & Blumesberger, Susanne (eds.): Felix Salten – der unbekannte Bekannte. Wien 2006. ISBN 3-7069-0368-7.
