= Bambi II =

2006 animated film by Brian Pimental

- DVD cover
- Directed by: Brian Pimental
- Screenplay by: Alicia Kirk
- Story by: Brian Pimental; Jeanne Rosenberg
- Based on: Characters created by Felix Salten
- Produced by: Jim Ballantine; Jeffrey Moznett; Dave Okey
- Starring: Alexander Gould; Patrick Stewart; Brendon Baerg; Nicky Jones; Andrea Bowen; Anthony Ghannam; Cree Summer; Keith Ferguson; Makenna Cowgill; Emma Rose Lima; Ariel Winter; Brian Pimental; Carolyn Hennesy; Mary Day; Alexis Restrum
- Edited by: Jeremy Milton; Mark Solomon
- Music by: Bruce Broughton
- Production company: Disneytoon Studios
- Distributed by: Buena Vista International (Most countries (Note: Released through the Walt Disney Pictures banner.)); Buena Vista Home Entertainment (North America, United Kingdom, Asia)
- Release dates: January 26, 2006 (Argentina); February 7, 2006 (United States)
- Running time: 69 minutes
- Countries: United States; Australia
- Language: English
- Box office: $35 million

Bambi II (also known as Bambi and the Great Prince of the Forest) is a 2006 American animated drama film directed by Brian Pimental and produced by the Australian office of Disneytoon Studios as a follow-up to the 1942 film Bambi. It premiered in theaters in Argentina on January 26, 2006, before being released as a direct-to-video title in the United States by Buena Vista Home Entertainment on February 7, 2006.

Taking place between Bambi's mother's death and Bambi shown as a young adult buck, the film follows Bambi's relationship with his father, The Great Prince of the Forest, and Bambi's efforts to earn his father's love for him. It was first titled Bambi and the Great Prince, but was renamed Bambi and the Great Prince of the Forest and later Bambi II.

== Plot ==
After his mother is shot and killed by a hunter, (Note: As depicted in Bambi (1942).) Bambi is greeted by his father the Great Prince, who takes him to the den. The Great Prince asks Friend Owl to find a doe to raise Bambi, but Friend Owl tells him that due to the harsh winter, the does can barely feed themselves. The Great Prince has to take care of Bambi until spring.

Sometime later, the Great Prince allows Bambi to be with his friends Thumper and Flower. At the groundhog ceremony, Bambi meets Faline, a young doe he had encountered before. The Groundhog is coaxed out of his hole, only to be scared back in by an older fawn named Ronno, who tries to impress Faline with stories of his encounter with Man. When Bambi believes the story, Ronno is about to fight Bambi until he is called away by his mother.

When the others leave, Bambi falls asleep waiting for his father and dreams about reuniting with his mother. He wakes up to what appears to be his mother's voice, which calls him into a meadow, but it turns out to be an ambush by Man. The Great Prince comes to Bambi's rescue and saves him in time, but is furious that he fell for the trick and almost getting himself killed. Days later, Bambi informs Thumper and Flower about his wish to impress his father. They decide to help Bambi be brave, but while doing so, they encounter a porcupine, who sticks his quills into Bambi's backside. Ronno and Faline, hearing the commotion, investigate; Bambi sees Ronno bothering Faline and gets into a fight with him. Ronno chases Bambi and Thumper through the forest until Bambi leaps over a large ravine to safety. The Great Prince, having seen the whole thing, is impressed by this feat. Ronno, jealous of the young prince, tries to jump over the chasm himself, but falls in, thwarted for now.

The next day, Thumper encourages Bambi to talk to the Great Prince, and the two connect. The Great Prince allows Bambi to come along with him on his patrols, and as the two get closer, Friend Owl approaches them and introduces them to Mena, a doe who was a childhood friend of Bambi's mother and has been selected by Friend Owl to be Bambi's new mother. Bambi realizes the Great Prince had planned on sending him away and snaps at his father, while the Great Prince concludes that he is not meant to raise Bambi. Bambi sadly accepts the change.

On the way to Mena's den, Ronno shows up to taunt Bambi again. The two get into another fight that sets off one of Man's traps, alerting Man. Bambi saves Mena by leading Man's dogs away from her, and the Great Prince arrives. The dogs chase Bambi, and his friends help him fend them off. Bambi evades all but one of the dogs. Bambi kicks the other dog off a cliff but falls off as well. Everyone grieves him until Bambi reveals he is still alive, and he and the Great Prince reconcile.

Sometime later, Thumper shares his version of the chase with the rest of his friends, and Bambi, whose antlers have just grown in, enjoys the tall tale with Faline. Ronno appears and vows vengeance on Bambi before being bitten on the nose by a turtle and runs off. Bambi meets up with the Great Prince, who shows him the field where he and Bambi's mother first met as fawns.

== Voice cast ==
- Alexander Gould as Bambi, the young prince of the forest. His mother dies, and he has to be with his father. Andrew Collins served as the supervising animator for Bambi.
- Patrick Stewart as the Great Prince of the Forest. He is Bambi's father, and due to the death of Bambi's mother, The Great Prince is forced to be the fawn's guardian. Pieter Lommerse served as the supervising animator for the Great Prince. Stewart was the only member of the cast to have been alive when the original film was released.
- Andrea Bowen as Faline. She has a massive romantic crush on Bambi and is part of a love triangle between Bambi and his future rival, Ronno.
- Brendon Baerg as Thumper. He and Flower are Bambi's friends who help him be brave to impress his father. Ian Harrowell served as the supervising animator for Thumper.
- Nicky Jones as Flower. He and Thumper are Bambi's friends who help him be brave to impress his father. Ian Harrowell served as the supervising animator for Flower.
- Anthony Ghannam as Ronno, Bambi's rival. He is the deer that Bambi fights in the original film. Bernard Derriman and Mark Henn served as the supervising animators for Ronno. Ronno has dialogue unlike in the original film in which he was silent.
- Cree Summer as Mena. She is to be Bambi's adoptive mother, and is a childhood friend of Bambi's mother.
- Keith Ferguson as Friend Owl, who is told by The Great Prince to find a new mother for Bambi.
- Makenna Cowgill, Emma Rose Lima, and Ariel Winter as Thumper's sisters. They annoy Thumper, who tries to hide from them.
- Carolyn Hennesy as Bambi's mother. She was shot by a hunter, and because of her death Bambi must be looked after by his father.
- Brian Pimental as Groundhog and Porcupine. The Groundhog, timid, comes out of his hole to determine if winter will end. The Porcupine is grumpy and overprotective of his log.

Mary Day, Jordan Orr, Alexis Restrum, George Shenusay, and Frank Welker provide additional voices.

== Release ==
The film was given a limited theatrical release in most countries such as France, Germany and Benelux territories. The film remained straight-to-video in the United States and select other countries, with a Disneytoon Studios prexy confirming that the film was never intended to be released theatrically in the US.

== Reception ==
The film sold 2.6 million DVDs in its first week in the United States. The film grossed $35 million in the territories where it was released theatrically.

Review were generally mixed, On the review aggregator website Rotten Tomatoes, 44% of 9 critics' reviews are positive, with an average rating of 5.4/10. Joe Leydon of Variety called it "lightly amusing but unremarkable." Conversely, R.L. Shaffer of IGN gave the film 7 out of 10, writing, "Bambi II might be pointless, but it's harmless as well. It's brilliantly animated, and it's fairly fun, too. Give this one a spin if you're in the mood for a cute little return to Disney's classic 2D animated realm."

It won Annie Award for Best Animated Home Entertainment Production at the 34th Annie Awards.

== Music ==
Bambi II's musical score includes instrumental pieces by Bruce Broughton, and new vocal songs by several noted artists, including Alison Krauss, Martina McBride, and Anthony Callea. Coinciding with the film's DVD release, the soundtrack was released by Walt Disney Records in the United States on February 7, 2006. Produced by Matt Walker, the CD includes nine songs from the film, as well as three tracks from Bambi. "Sing the Day" was written for the "Running Brave" sequence in Bambi II, but unused.

=== Songs ===
Original songs performed in the film include:

No.	Title	Performer(s)	Length
1.	"There Is Life"	Alison Krauss
2.	"First Sign of Spring"	Michelle Lewis
3.	"Through Your Eyes"	Martina McBride
4.	"The Healing of a Heart"	Anthony Callea

== Notes ==
Records
Preceded by Fantasia 2000; 60 years	Longest time until sequel movie 64 years 2006–present	Incumbent
