= Flower (Bambi) =

Disney Bambi character

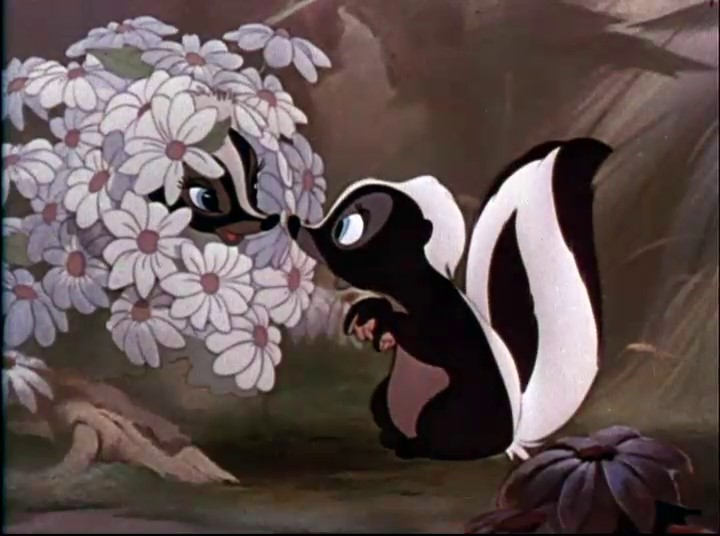
- Flower (right) first meeting his mate Petunia in the film Bambi
- First appearance: Bambi; August 9, 1942
- Created by: Marc Davis
- Voiced by: Stan Alexander (young); Tim Davis (adolescent); Sterling Holloway (adult); (Bambi); Nicky Jones (Bambi II); Roland Rubio (Lego Disney Princess: The Castle Quest)
- Species: Skunk
- Spouse: Petunia
- Children: Bambi, Buttercup, Primrose

Flower is a fictional striped skunk introduced in Disney's animated features Bambi (1942). He is an original character created for the film.

In addition to the Bambi films, Flower has made several cameos in other Disney works, including animated series and films. Flower also appears in various forms (including merchandise) at Disney Parks and other retailers.

Flower is voiced by Stan Alexander, Tim Davis, and Sterling Holloway in the original film, Nicky Jones in Bambi II, and Roland Rubio in Lego Disney Princess: The Castle Quest.

According to Disney animator and historian Andreas Deja, Flower was the first animal character that Marc Davis researched, studied, sketched, and animated before his work on Bambi and Thumper.

In terms of Flower's personality and character, he is consistently timid, coy, and soft-spoken. As he matures from kit to adult skunk, Flower becomes a bit less bashful and a tad more masculine. Miscellaneous scholarly writings covering gender fluidity and misrecognition refer to Flower's evolving tendencies or mannerisms as an example.

== Appearances ==
=== Bambi filmography ===
==== Bambi (1942) ====
Thumper is teaching Bambi how to speak while exploring the forest. After learning bird and butterfly, Thumper shows Bambi a flower in a flower bed. Bambi sticks his head into the flowers and comes nose to nose with a baby skunk. Bambi, trying to impress Thumper, mistakenly calls the skunk a flower. Thumper laughs hysterically and tries to correct Bambi, but the bashful yet friendly skunk tells Thumper: "Oh, that's alright, he can call me a flower if he wants to. I don't mind."

The following winter, Bambi and Thumper wake up Flower to join in on the fun. Flower declines and falls back asleep into hibernation.

==== Bambi II (2006) ====
Bambi II covers Bambi's life after losing his mother until a young adult buck, including the relationship between him and his father, the Great Prince of the Forest, and efforts to earn his father's love and respect.

Along with Thumper, Flower takes the time to teach Bambi how to be brave. While Bambi is trying to apply his learning of bravery, Flower reveals his chelonaphobia (fear of turtles). This fear was reinforced near the film's ending when he and his forest friends witness a turtle bite Ronno's nose. In hopes of more winter (and hibernating), Flower also joins his forest friends to watch the groundhog.

When Man's pack of hunting dogs chases Bambi through the forest, Flower sprays one of them away on Thumper's command.

=== Additional animated appearances ===
- Flower makes minor appearances in House of Mouse. His most notable appearance was in the episode "Pete's House of Villains" when Pete loudly complains that the club stinks, then proceeds to point out Flower. Pete hurts Flower's feelings and draws the ire of Bambi and Thumper.
- Flower appears in Lego Disney Princess: The Castle Quest, where he assists Snow White, Tiana, and Rapunzel through the Dark Forest in search of the Sundrop Flower.
- Flower appears in Once Upon a Studio, voiced by archival audio of Stan Alexander.

=== Video games ===
Flower appears as a playable character in the video game Disney Magic Kingdoms.

== Other appearances ==
=== Disney theme parks ===
Flower was a meet-and-greet character at Disneyland and at Walt Disney World until the late 1970s.

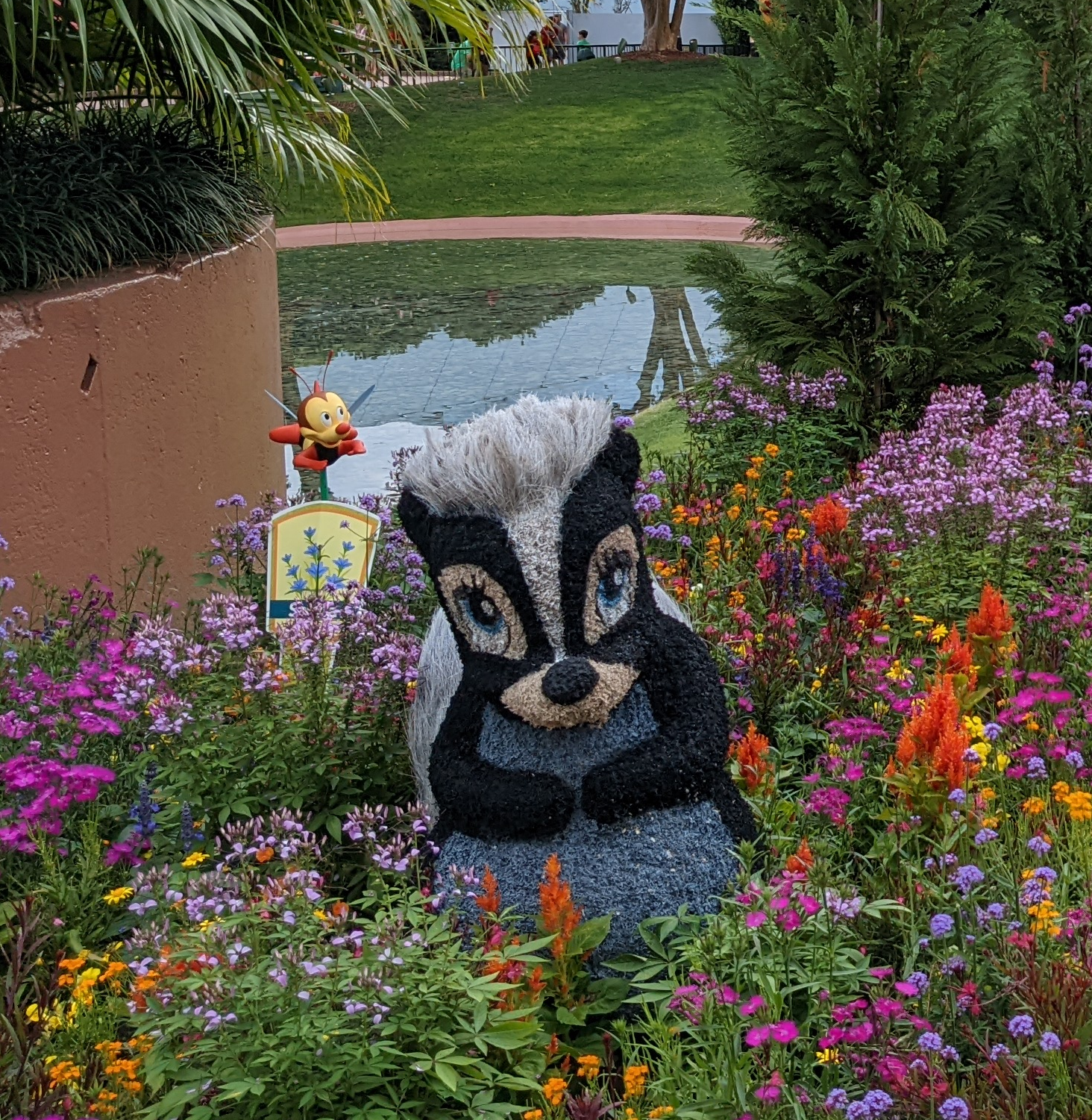
Topiary of Flower at the Epcot International Flower and Garden Festival

Since 2015 at the Epcot International Flower and Garden Festival, Flower has his own topiary next to Bambi and Thumper.

The scene of Flower meeting Bambi for the first time was included in the World of Color at Disneyland California Adventure. A pencil line drawing of the same scene is projected during Wondrous Journeys at Disneyland.

=== Skunk awareness ===
Various wildlife sanctuaries, nature centers, and humane societies around the United States have named their rescued skunks "Flower" after the fictional character to help educate the public about wildlife and domesticated skunks.
