= Tim Davis (actor) =

American child actor (1924–1982)

- Born: Duane Timston Davis; March 9, 1924; Los Angeles, California, U.S.
- Died: October 30, 1982 (aged 58); San Luis Obispo, California, U.S.
- Occupations: Film actor, voice actor
- Years active: 1934–1942
- Known for: Bambi (as Adolescent Thumper and Adult Flower); Joe Crowell in Our Town (on stage and on film)
- Spouse: Barbara Louise Ressel
- Relatives: Dix Davis (brother)

Tim Davis (born Duane Timston Davis; March 9, 1924 – October 30, 1982) was an American child actor, known for his voice work in the 1942 Disney animated feature film, Bambi as young Thumper and adult Flower, and his performance in the 1940 film of Thornton Wilder's Our Town, in which he plays the older of the two newsboy siblings—the other portrayed by his younger brother Dix Davis.

== Early life and career ==
A native of Los Angeles, California, Davis was the older of two sons born to Fredrick Duane Davis and Marion Naomi Stimson. According to an article published in 1942 by the Harrisburg Telegraph, the brothers' transformation from newsboys to thespians occurred in 1934 when a party of passersby led by songwriter Gus Kahn encountered the pair hawking papers in front of The Brown Derby on Wilshire Boulevard. Advised to report the next morning to United Artists, the brothers did so, and shortly thereafter made their uncredited screen debut in the 1934 Eddie Cantor musical comedy Kid Millions.

A rare opportunity to transcend the mostly uncredited and generally insubstantial film work that followed that debut came Davis's way in 1939 with the West Coast premiere of Thornton Wilder's Our Town. In a production boasting "infallibly accurate [...] characterizations" from a cast "too numerous to mention," several reviewers nonetheless made a point of citing Davis's work, as seen in this excerpt from The Hollywood Reporter:

The presentation on a bare stage is by now an old story, but the spell woven over the audience by Frank Craven as narrator, and the delineations by James Spottswood, Tim Davis, Martha Scott, Thomas Coley, Tom Fadden, Anne Shoemaker, Helen Carew and all the others of the large cast made it possible to build without losing the audience.

== Personal life and death ==
On December 14, 1942, roughly 4 months after the release of Bambi (and a year after U.S.'s entry into World War II), the trade publication Broadcasting reported that Davis had resigned from NBC Hollywood and joined the United States Navy. Davis later married Barbara Louise Ressel on September 27, 1953. Davis died at age 58 in San Luis Obispo on October 30, 1982.

== Partial filmography ==
- Kid Millions (1934) - Little Boy in Ice Cream Number (uncredited)
- Riders of the Dawn (1937) - Dad Moran's son (uncredited)
- Tex Rides with the Boy Scouts (1937) - Tommy Kent (uncredited)
- Our Gang Follies of 1938 (1937) - Boy Sitting at Table behind Georgia LaRue and Philip McMahon in 'Club Spanky' scene (uncredited)
- The Adventures of Tom Sawyer (1938) - Schoolboy (uncredited)
- The Little Ranger (1938) - Member of Butch's gang (uncredited)
- Aladdin's Lantern (1938) - Boy Sitting Behind Gary (uncredited)
- Gambling Ship (1938) – Nick
- Feathered Pests (1939) - Kid
- Joe and Ethel Turp Call on the President (1939) – Jackie
- The Marshal of Mesa City (1939) – Unknown role (uncredited)
- Captain Spanky's Show Boat (1940) - Blonde Kid Behind Butch (uncredited)
- Our Town (1940) - Joe Crowell
- Nice Girl? (1940) - Newsboy (uncredited)
- Citizen Kane (1941) - Copy boy (uncredited)
- Bambi (1942) - Adolescent Thumper and Adult Flower (voice)
