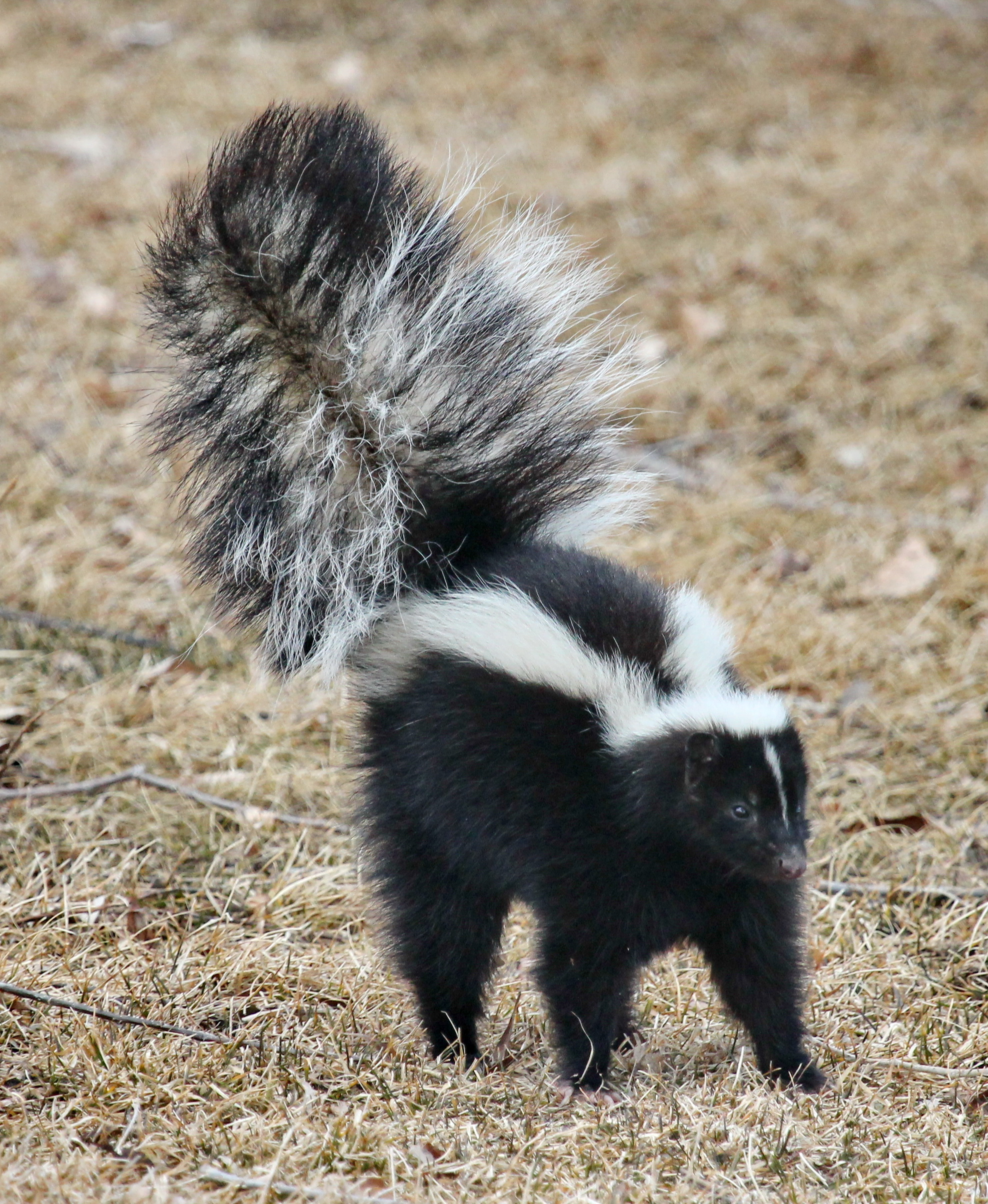

Conservation status
- Least Concern (IUCN 3.1)

Scientific classification
- Kingdom: Animalia
- Phylum: Chordata
- Class: Mammalia
- Order: Carnivora
- Family: Mephitidae
- Genus: Mephitis
- Species: M. mephitis

Binomial name
- Mephitis mephitis (Schreber, 1776)
- Striped skunk range

Synonyms
- Viverra mephitis Schreber, 1776

= Striped skunk =

Striped skunk Temporal range: Middle Pleistocene–Present

Species of mammal

The striped skunk (Mephitis mephitis) is a skunk of the genus Mephitis that occurs across much of North America, including southern Canada, the United States, and northern Mexico. It is currently listed as least concern by the IUCN on account of its wide range and ability to adapt to human-modified environments.

Striped skunks are polygamous omnivores with few natural predators, save for birds of prey. Striped skunks are mostly nocturnal. Like all skunks, they possess highly developed musk-filled scent glands to ward off predators. They have a long history of association with humans, having been trapped and captively bred for their fur and kept as pets. The striped skunk is one of the most recognizable of North America's animals, and is a popular figure in cartoons and children's books.

== Taxonomy ==
The striped skunk was first formally named by Johann Christian Daniel von Schreber as Viverra mephitis. The type locality is in eastern Canada.

=== Evolution ===
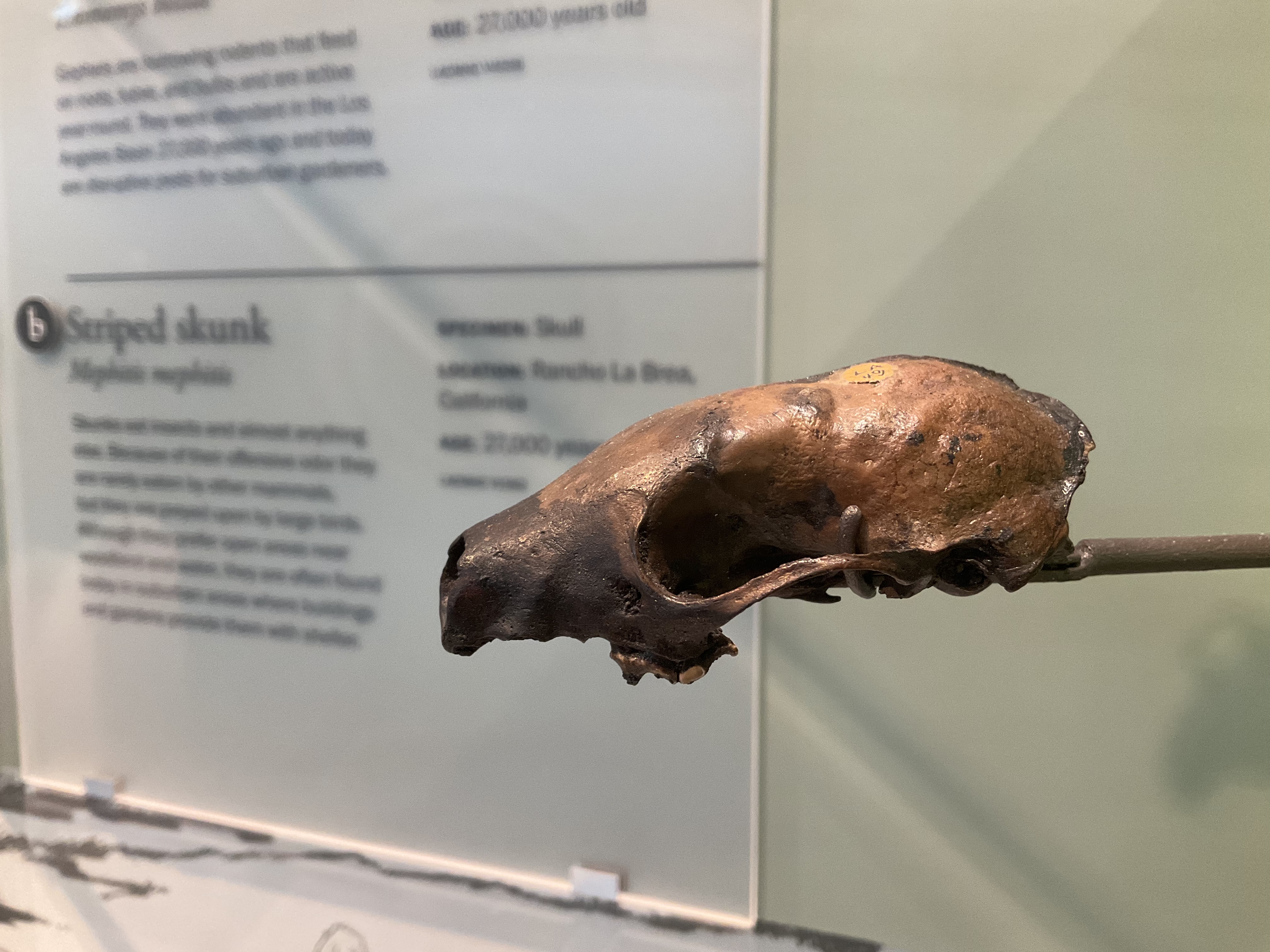
27,000-year-old fossil skull from Rancho La Brea, California

The earliest fossil finds attributable to Mephitis were found in the Broadwater site in Nebraska, dating back to the early Pleistocene less than 1.8 million years ago. By the late Pleistocene (70,000–14,500 years ago), the striped skunk was widely distributed throughout the southern United States, and it expanded northwards and westwards by the Holocene (10,000–4,500 years ago) following the retreat of the Wisconsin glacier.

Phylogenetic analyses of the species' cytochrome b gene and microsatellite data in 2012 indicated that there are four phylogroups of striped skunk. The first emerged from the Texas-Mexico region during the Rancholabrean before the Illinoian glaciation and colonized the southeastern United States. The second, still originating in the Texas-Mexico region, expanded westwards to the Rocky Mountains during the Illinoian glacial period. Two subsequent subclades were formed during the Sangamonian interglacial on either side of the Sierra Nevada. The subclade that colonized the Great Basin later expanded eastwards across the northern Rocky Mountains during the Holocene, recolonising the Great Plains and making contact with the southern phylogroup. A similar, but less significant, secondary contact occurred when the same subclade intermingled with members of the eastern phylogroup east of the Mississippi river.

=== Subspecies ===
Thirteen subspecies of the striped skunk are generally recognized:

Subspecies	Skin	Skull	Trinomial authority	Description	Range	Synonyms
Canada skunk M. m. mephitis (Nominate subspecies)			Schreber, 1776	A large subspecies with a short and slender tail and a mixed black and white coat with constant markings running down its back.	Eastern Canada; Nova Scotia, Quebec, and northern Ontario.	M. americana (Desmarest, 1818), chinche (Fischer, 1829), mephitica (Saw, 1792), vulgaris (F. Cuvier, 1842)
Illinois skunk M. m. avia			Bangs, 1898	Akin to M. m. mesomelas, but with a slightly larger skull.	Prairie region of Illinois, western Indiana, and eastern Iowa.	newtonensis Brown, 1908
Florida skunk M. m. elongata			Bangs, 1895	A medium-sized subspecies with a very long tail. The white markings are usually extremely broad down from its nape.	Florida to North Carolina, and in the mountains to West Virginia; west on the Gulf coast to the Mississippi River.	
Arizona skunk M. m. estor			Merriam, 1890	A smaller subspecies resembling M. m. varians, but with a shorter tail and smaller skull. The white markings are particularly broad along the back and tail.	Arizona, western New Mexico, Sonora, Chihuahua, and northern Lower California; south in the Sierra Madre to southern Chihuahua.	
Southern California skunk M. m. holzneri			Mearns, 1898	Similar to M. m. occidentalis, but smaller and more slender.	Southern California, from vicinity of Monterey Bay south into Lower California; east to the Sierra Nevada and San Bernardino Range.	
Northern plains skunk M. m. hudsonica			Richardson, 1829	A very large subspecies with a heavily furred, sizable tail.	Western Canada, from Manitoba to British Columbia; south in the United States to Colorado, Nebraska, and Minnesota.	americana (Lesson, 1865), chinga (Tiedemann, 1808), minnesotoe (Brass, 1911)
Great Basin skunk M. m. major			Howell, 1901	Probably the largest subspecies, similar to M. m. occidentalis, but with longer hind feet and a heavier skull and general body.	Eastern Oregon, northern California, and Nevada; east to the Wasatch Mountains in Utah.	
Louisiana skunk M. m. mesomelas			Lichtenstein, 1832	A very small, short-tailed subspecies.	West side of Mississippi Valley from southern Louisiana to Missouri; westward along the coast of Texas to Matagorda Island; and up the Red River Valley as far at least as Wichita Falls.	mesomeles (Gerrard, 1862), scrutator (Bangs, 1896)
Eastern skunk M. m. nigra			Peale and Palisot de Beauvois, 1796	A medium-sized subspecies, with a longer tail than that of M. m. mephitis but shorter than M. m. varians.	New England and Middle Atlantic States; south to Virginia; west to Indiana.	bivirgata (C. E. H. Smith, 1839), dentata (Brass, 1911), fetidissima (Boitard, 1842), frontata (Coues, 1875), olida (Boitard, 1842), putida (Boitard, 1842)
Cascade Mountains skunk M. m. notata			Hall, 1936	Similar to M. m. occidentalis, but with a shorter tail, heavier skull, and narrower stripes.	Southern Washington and northern Oregon, east of the Cascade Mountains.	
California skunk M. m. occidentalis			Baird, 1858	A large subspecies resembling M. m. hudsonica, but with a longer tail and narrower skull.	Northern and central California, from the vicinity of Monterey Bay northward, west of the Sierra and Cascades, to the Willamette Valley, Oregon.	notata (Howell, 1901), platyrhina (Howell, 1901)
Puget Sound skunk M. m. spissigrada			Bangs, 1898	Similar to M. m. occidentalis, but with a shorter tail and more white on the body and tail.	Shores of Puget Sound and coastal region of Washington and northern Oregon.	foetulenta (Elliot, 1899)
Texas long-tailed skunk M. m. varians			Gray, 1837	A large, very long-tailed subspecies whose markings closely approach those of M. m. hudsonica in size and shape.	Southern and western Texas, eastern New Mexico, and adjacent parts of Mexico; north into Oklahoma, Colorado, Kansas, and Nebraska.	texana (Low, 1879)

=== Vernacular names ===
The English word skunk has two root words of Algonquian and Iroquoian origin, specifically seganku (Abenaki) and scangaresse (Huron). The Cree and Ojibwe word shee-gawk is the root word for Chicago, which means 'skunk-land'. Alternative English names for the striped skunk include common skunk, Hudsonian skunk, northern skunk, black-tailed skunk and prairie polecat. The latter name was originally used by English settlers, who noted the animal's similarity to the European polecat. This association likely resulted in the striped skunk's subsequent unfavorable reputation as a poultry thief, despite it being a much less destructive animal than the true polecat. The name "Alaska sable" was employed by furriers during the late 19th century.

Local indigenous names include:

Indigenous names for Mephitis mephitis
Linguistic group or area	Indigenous name
Abenaki	segôgw
Chipewyan	nool'-tsee-a
Plains Cree	sikâk ᓯᑳᐠ
Swampy, Moose, and James Bay Cree	šikâkw/shikaakw ᔑᑳᒄ
Lenape	shkakw
Menominee	sekāk
Meskwaki-Sauk-Kickapoo, Shawnee	shekâkwa
‌ Mi'kmaq	apikjilu
Ojibwe	zhigaag / zhgaagoo
Potawatomi	shegak
Tŝilhqot'in (Chilcotin)	guli
Huron	scangaresse
Ogallala Sioux	mah-kah
Yankton Sioux	mah-cah

== Description ==
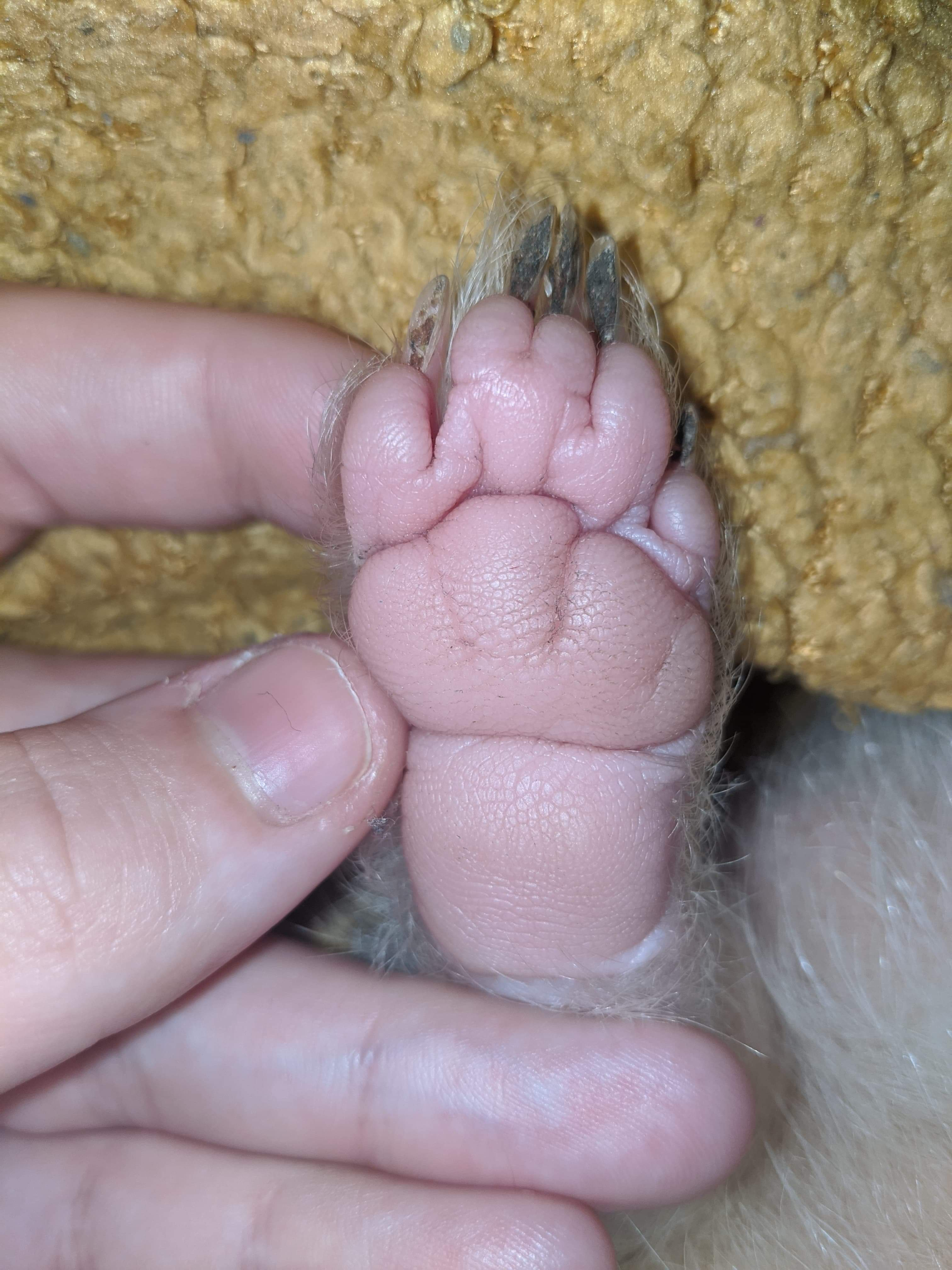
Left hind foot of an albino skunk

The striped skunk is a stoutly-built, short-limbed animal with a small, conical head and a long, heavily furred tail. Adult males are 10% larger than females, with both sexes measuring between 52–77 centimetres (20–30 in) in total body length and usually weighing 1.8–4.5 kg (4.0–9.9 lb), though some may weigh 5.5 kg (12 lb). The feet are plantigrade with bare soles, and are not as broad or flat as those of hog-nosed skunks. The forefeet are armed with five long, curved claws adapted for digging, while those on the hind feet are shorter and straighter.

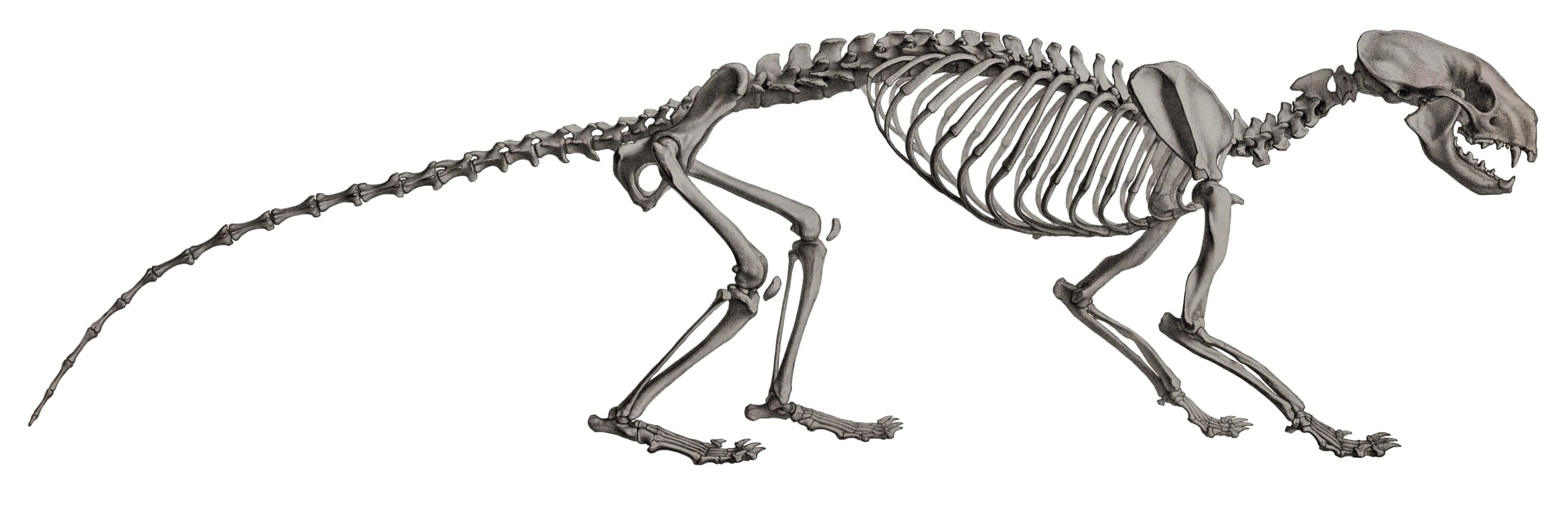
Skeleton

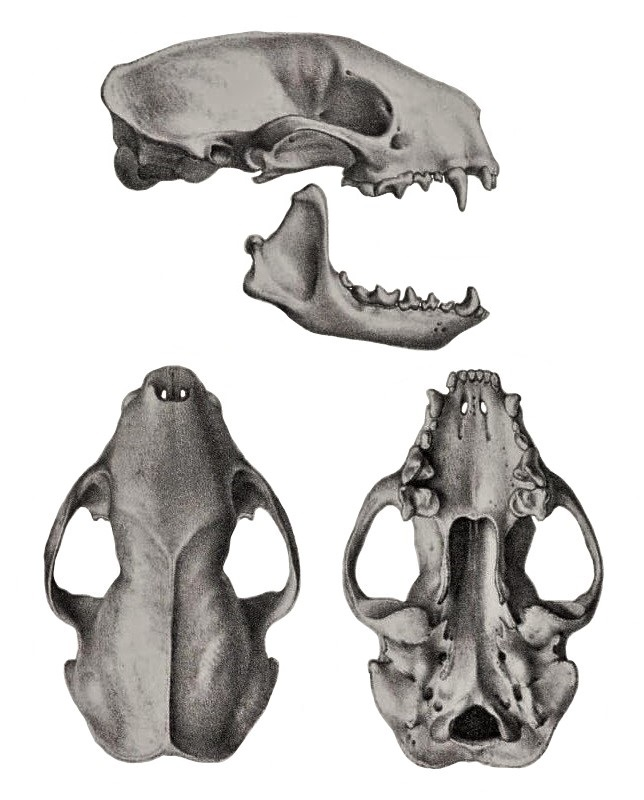
Skull

The color patterns of the fur vary greatly, but generally consist of a black base with a white stripe extending from the head which divides along the shoulders, continuing along the flanks to the rump and tail. Some specimens have a white patch on the chest, while others bear white stripes on the outer surface of the front limbs. Brown or cream-colored mutations occasionally occur.

Like all skunks, the striped skunk possesses two highly developed scent glands, one on each side of the anus, containing about 15 millilitres (0.53 imp fl oz; 0.51 US fl oz) of musk each, which provides a chemical defense against predation. This oily, yellow-colored musk consists of a mixture of powerfully odorous thiols (sulfur analogues of alcohols, in older sources called "mercaptans"), which can be sprayed at a distance of several meters. The odor of this musk was likened by Ernest Thompson Seton to a mixture of perfume musk, essence of garlic, burning sulfur and sewer gas "magnified a thousand times", though Clinton Hart Merriam claimed that it is not "one tenth" as offensive as that produced by minks and weasels. If sprayed on the eyes, this compound can cause a temporary burning sensation.

== Life history ==
=== Reproduction and development ===
The striped skunk is polygamous, and normally breeds once a year, though yearling females who have failed to mate may enter a second estrous cycle a month after the first. The mating season usually occurs between mid-February to mid-April, though it is delayed at higher latitudes. Prior to copulating, the males' testicles swell during the January–February period, with maximum size being attained in March. Males during this period will cover much ground in their search for females, sometimes covering 4 km (2.5 mi) per night.

When a male locates a female, he will approach her from the rear and lick her genitals, then bite her on the nape before copulating. A single male may have a harem of several females, which he mates with and defends against other males for a period of about 35 days. Once the mating period has finished, the impregnated females confine themselves to their dens, while the males attempt to rebuild their fat reserves.

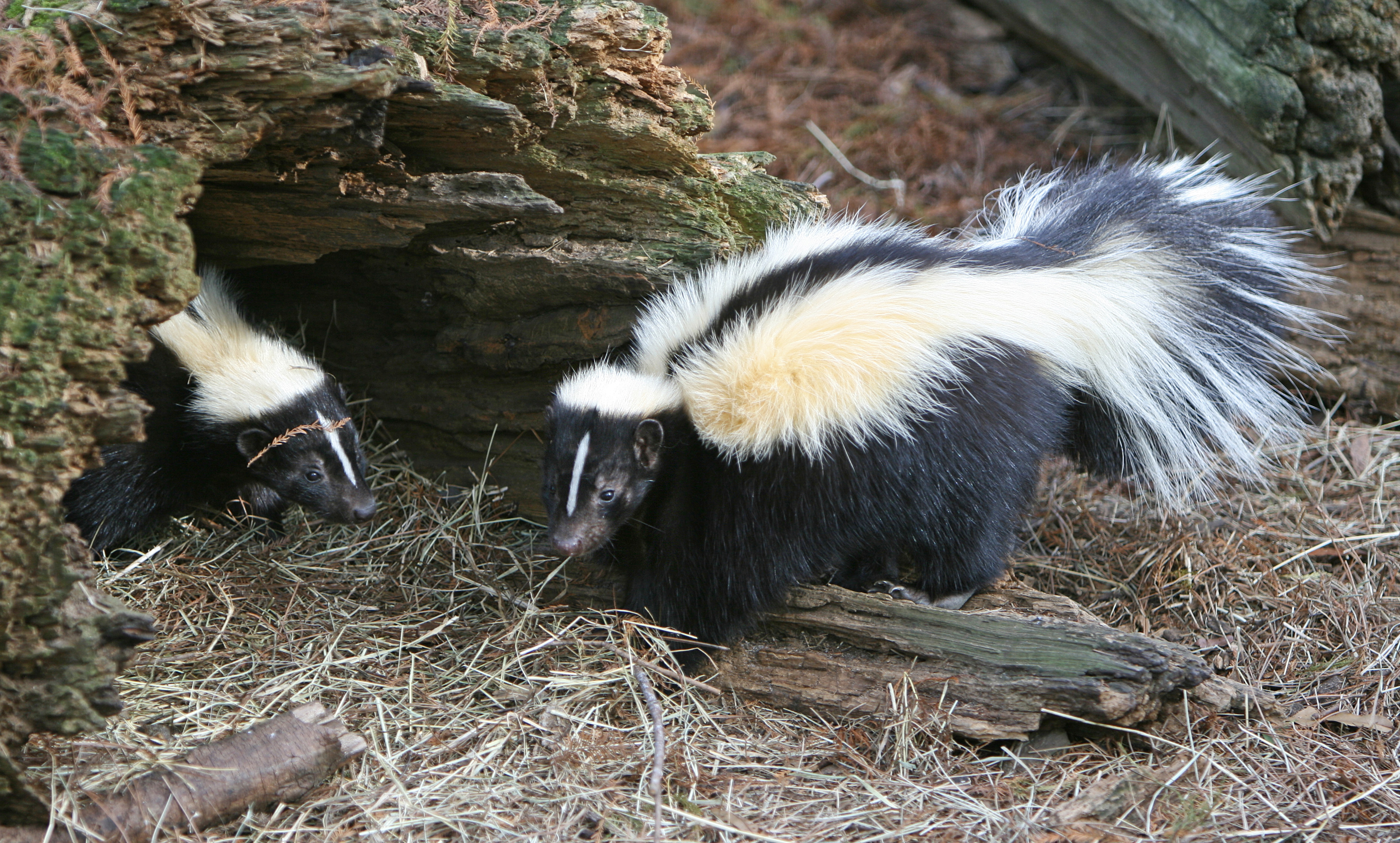
Striped skunk pair

The gestation period lasts around 59–77 days, with kits being born at about mid-May to early June. Litters generally consist of 2–12 kits, with the average being five or six, though a litter of 18 is known from Pennsylvania. Kits are born blind and sparsely furred, weighing 25–40 grams. The eyes open after around three weeks, and they are weaned after 42–56 days. Although their musk is still undeveloped, kits of this age will instinctively assume the defensive stand position when threatened. At this point, the kits may accompany their mother outside the den, becoming independent after 2 1/2 months.

=== Denning and sheltering behaviors ===
The striped skunk may dig its own dens, though it will appropriate those abandoned by other animals should the opportunity present itself. These dens are normally used only in late fall, winter, and early spring, while females with unweaned kits make use of them in late spring and summer. In cultivated areas, striped skunks will dig their dens in fencerows, likely because they are less likely to be disturbed by machinery or livestock. In winter it is common for a single den to be occupied by multiple females and a single male. During this period, the striped skunk saves its energy by lowering its body temperature from 38 °C (100 °F) to 32 °C (90 °F). Although it will forage for short periods in winter, it primarily depends on its fat reserves in cold weather, and can lose as much as 50% of its body weight.

== Ecology ==
=== Habitat ===
The striped skunk inhabits a wide variety of habitats, particularly mixed woodlands, brushy corners and open fields interspersed with wooded ravines and rocky outcrops. Some populations, particularly in northwestern Illinois, prefer cultivated areas over uncultivated ones.

=== Diet ===
While primarily an insectivore, the striped skunk is adaptable enough to incorporate other animals and even vegetable matter into its diet. The most frequently consumed insects include grasshoppers, beetles, crickets, caterpillars, other insect larvae and bees. Other invertebrates may include worms, crayfish and other non-insect arthropods. In the winter and spring months, the striped skunk will supplement its diet with vertebrates such as white-footed mice, voles, eggs and the chicks of ground nesting birds. The striped skunk is also known to consume amphibians, reptiles, carrion and fish. Striped skunks inhabiting California's coastal areas will feed on crabs and beached fish. While not adapted for chasing fleet-footed prey, at least one specimen was observed pursuing gray cottontails into their burrows. The skunk will also consume vegetable matter, such as apples, blueberries, black cherries, ground cherries, corn and nightshade when in season.

Striped skunks are known to use their sharp claws to tear apart rotting logs to find grubs, dig in the soil for insects, and pin down prey. Their practice of digging leaves small-but-noticeable pits in the ground, which can provide evidence of their presence in an area.

=== Predation ===
Because of its formidable defensive capability, the striped skunk has few natural enemies. Mammalian predators typically avoid skunks, unless they are starving. Such predators include cougars, coyotes, bobcats, badgers, and red and gray foxes. Predatory birds, including golden and bald eagles, and great horned owls tend to have greater success in hunting skunks, though they still risk being blinded by their prey's musk.

=== Disease ===
The striped skunk is one of the major carriers of the rabies virus, second only to raccoons in the US where skunks are 25% of annual cases. Skunks are the primary hosts in the north- and south-central United States as well as in Canada. Cases of rabies in this species are generally epizootic and recurrent. They are also host for the canine parvovirus and may also suffer from leptospirosis. A striped skunk from Texas was found to be a host of an intestinal acanthocephalan worm, Pachysentis canicola.

== Relationships with humans ==
=== In culture ===
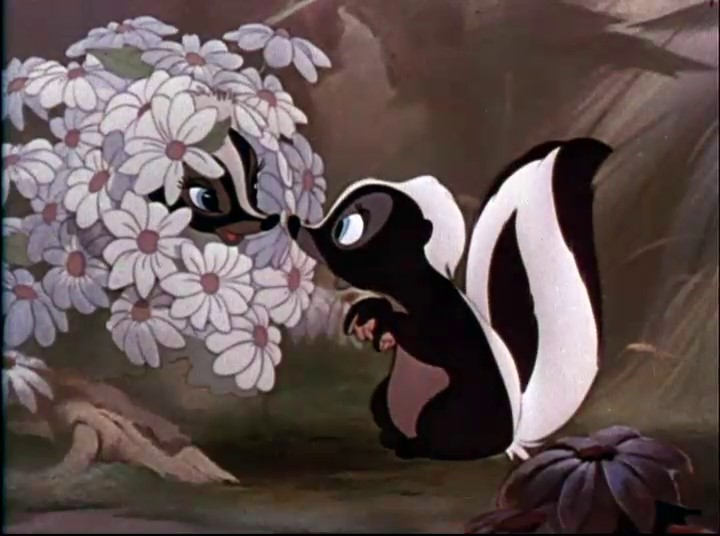
Striped skunks as depicted in Bambi

The striped skunk is commonly featured in the myths and oral traditions of Native Americans. Some stories try to explain its striped pattern or how it got its smell. Skunks fill various roles in legends and may be featured as heroes, villains, tricksters, or monsters. For the Muscogee people, the skunk represented family loyalty and defense of loved ones. The Winnebago people used the skunk to symbolize vanity, being beautiful on the outside but ugly on the inside.

The striped skunk was once called the "emblem of America" by Ernest Thompson Seton. It has been prevalent in modern popular culture, being the subject of various jazz and funk songs like Cab Calloway's "Skunk Song" and the Brecker Brothers' "Some Skunk Funk". The skunk connection in these genres may be due to the term "funk" being a term for strong odor. The novelty song "Dead Skunk" by Loudon Wainwright III was popular in the early 1970s. Skunks are also popular characters in children's stories, comics and cartoons, most notably the Warner Bros. character Pepé Le Pew and the Disney character Flower from the 1942 animated film Bambi, their musky odor making them a source of fear and ostracization.

=== Trapping and fur use ===
The striped skunk is one of North America's most sought-after furbearers, and was once the second most harvested after the muskrat. Its fur is intrinsically valuable, being durable and having rich luster, though this trait decreases with wear and exposure to sunlight. Skunk pelts are divided into four grades, with the most prized being the ones with a greater amount of black. These grades are further subdivided in value according to their locality, with the most valuable occurring in northern regions, where the fur is finer and darker. Skunks are notable for being easy to trap, even approaching traps they had been previously caught in. Because skunks are difficult to kill without having them discharge their musk (and thus ruin their fur) they were typically dispatched with a paralyzing blow to the lower back or drowned if caught in a box trap.

Skunk farming largely began during the late 1890s, when there was much foreign demand for their skins, and intensive trapping had largely extirpated the more valuable mostly black-colored specimens. Captive breeding of skunks proved relatively simple when compared to mink and marten farming, as skunks are easier to tame and have less specialized dietary needs. Emphasis was placed on selectively breeding the tamest and darkest colored skunks. Prior to the First World War, skunk pelts were primarily shipped to Europe until better methods of deodorizing and processing the skins lead to increased interest in selling them for North American consumption. Despite being easy to breed and manage, skunk farming was not overly profitable, as the relatively low price of the pelts did not compensate for the costs in maintaining them. Nevertheless, raising skunks was considered good practice for amateur fur farmers wishing to later move on to more valuable furbearers like martens, sable, mink and silver foxes.

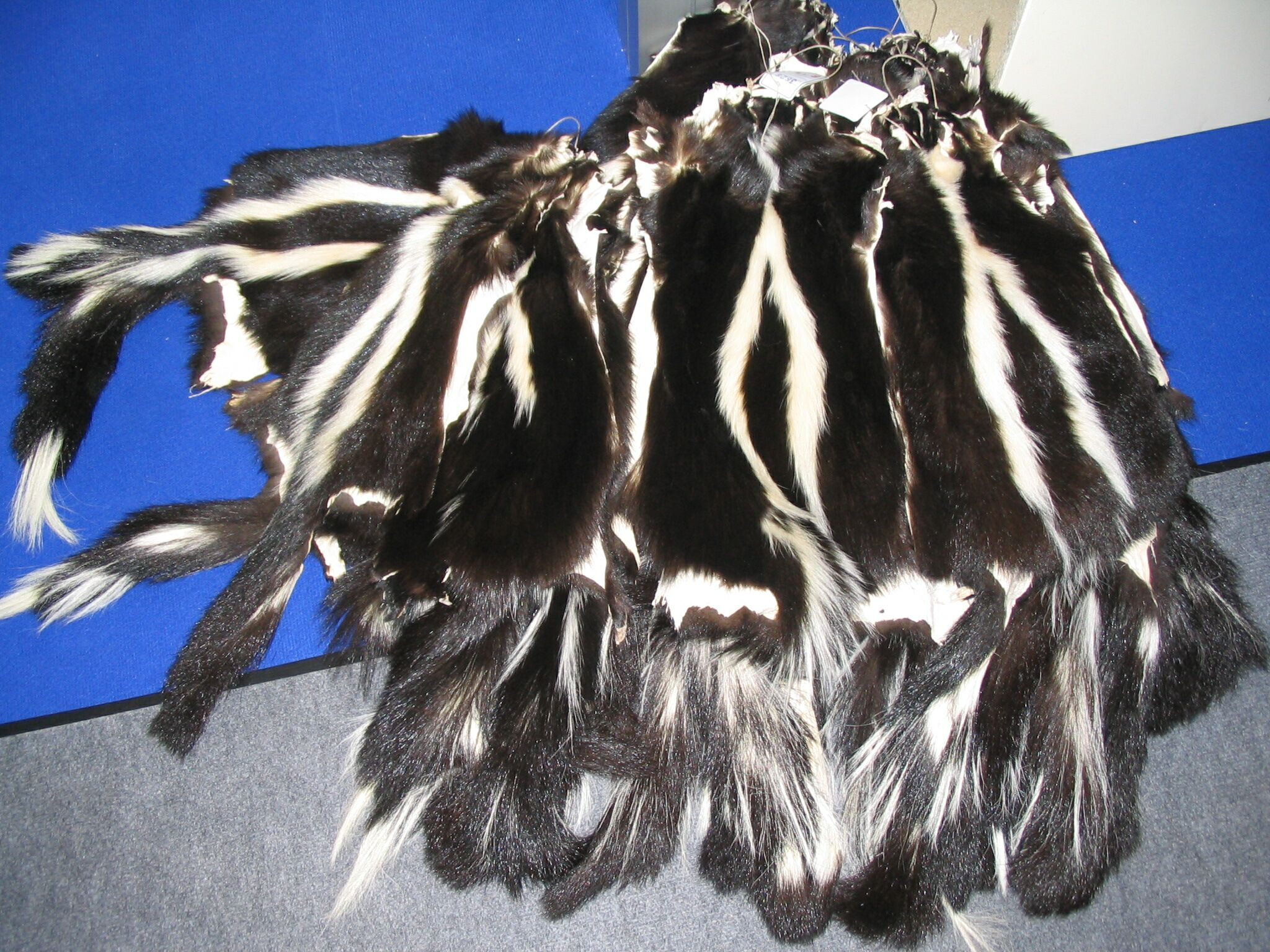
Striped skunk pelts

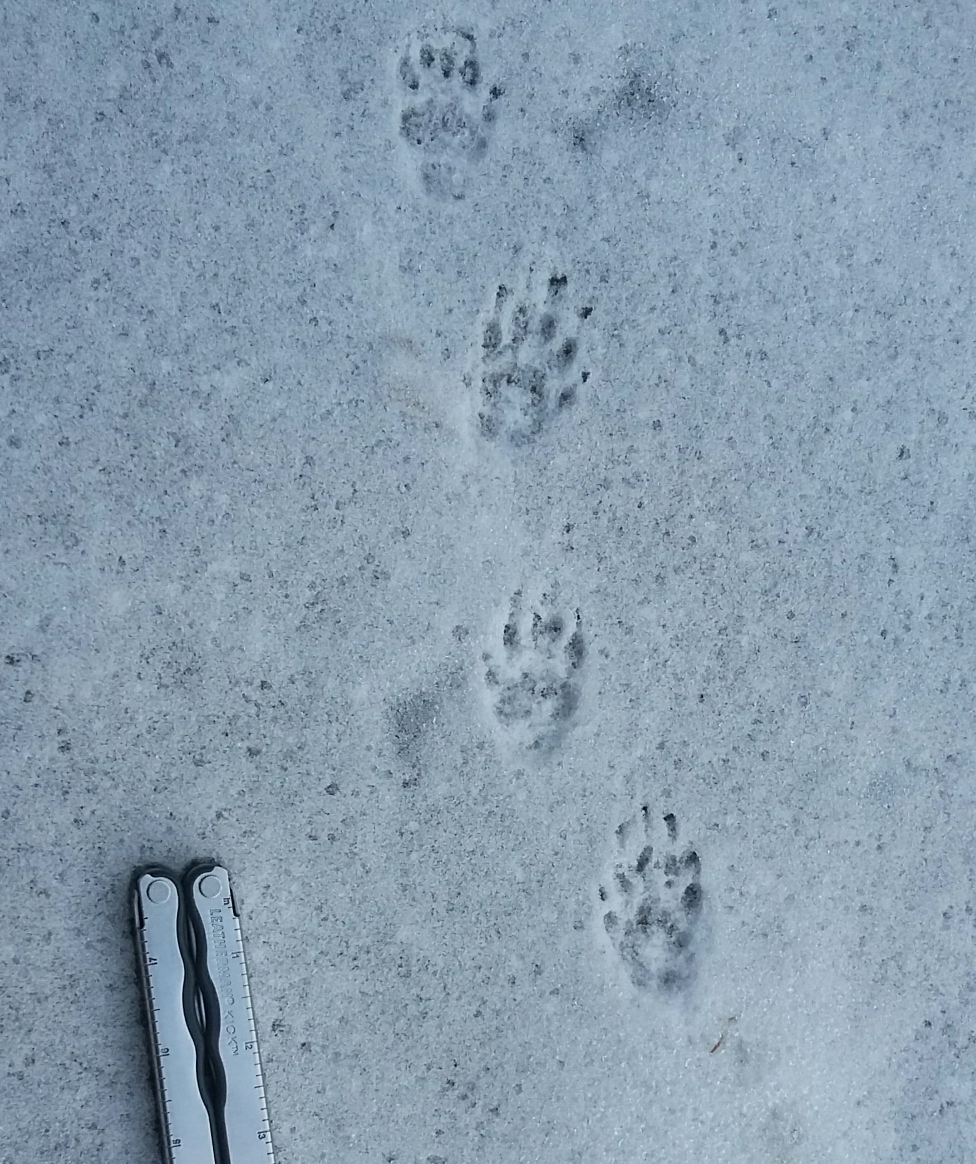
Tracks in the snow

=== Taming ===
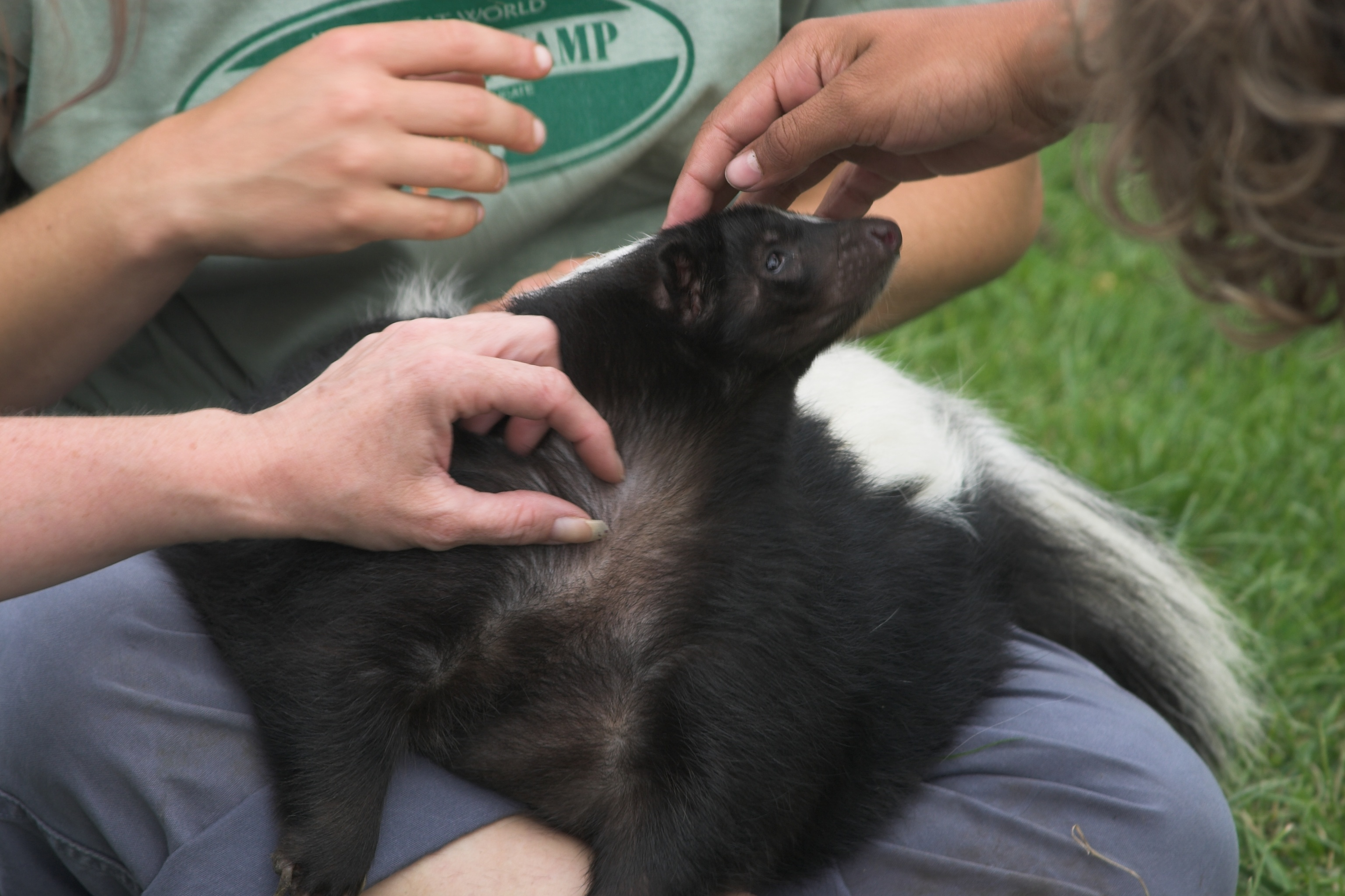
A tamed skunk being petted

The striped skunk is easily tamed and was often kept in barns to kill rats and mice during the 19th century. Selective breeding has resulted in the emergence of various color mutations, including black, chocolate-brown or smokey gray and white, apricot, albino, white, lavender, champagne and mahogany.

=== Other uses ===
The striped skunk was regularly eaten by trappers and indigenous peoples, provided the animal was not too old or had not sprayed before being killed. American zoologist Clinton Hart Merriam described skunk meat as white, tender, sweet and more delicate than chicken. The meat was prized by Chinese immigrants, who also bought skunk gall bladders for medicinal purposes.

The fat was once reputed to make an excellent lubricant.

The musk was once used as a folk remedy for asthma, despite its very strong odor.
