= Brian Pimental =

American storyboard artist, director and screenwriter (born 1964)

- Born: April 13, 1964 (age 62); Massachusetts, U.S.
- Occupations: Storyboard artist, director, screenwriter, and actor
- Known for: A Goofy Movie; Tarzan; Bambi II; Spellbound

Brian Dennis Pimental is an American veteran storyboard artist, director and screenwriter of live action and animated films. He is best known for directing Bambi II (2006).

== Biography ==
Having started his career at Walt Disney Feature Animation as a trainee on Oliver & Company (1988), he went on to become a story artist on Beauty and the Beast (1991), for which he created the "Be Our Guest" sequence as well as the "Human Again" sequence, the latter of which was featured in both the Broadway play and the extended version of the film. He was also a story artist on Aladdin (1992).

He went on to become one of the screenwriters on A Goofy Movie (1995). He was also the Head of Story and earned his first ASIFA Award nomination for storyboarding on this film. His second nomination was for the film Tarzan (1999), for which he once again headed up the story team as Head of Story.

His directorial debut came on Bambi II (2006), which went on to win the ASIFA award for best non-theatrical feature. He also created the voices for the Porcupine and Groundhog in the film.

A native of Massachusetts, Pimental earned a Bachelor of Fine Arts Degree at the California Institute of the Arts. He is currently working independently as director/writer.
