= Nicky Jones =

American actor (born 1996)

- Born: Nicholas Payne Jones; July 16, 1996 (age 30); Houston, Texas, U.S.
- Occupation: Voice Actor
- Years active: 2006–2010

Nicholas Payne Jones (born July 16, 1996) is an American retired voice actor and former child actor. He is best known for voicing the titular lead character in the Cartoon Network animated comedy series Chowder (2007–2010). He also voiced Flower, one of the main characters in the 2006 Disneytoon Studios animated drama film Bambi II.

== Biography ==
Nicholas Payne Jones was born on July 16, 1996, in Houston in Texas, United States. His parents were news broadcaster and radio host Terri Yvonne Jones (née Cannon; 1963–2019), and Dallas Jones. He has a brother named Peyton. His family moved to Los Angeles, California when he was a child.

Jones begun his career in the early childhood, as a child model, later switching to acting. In 2006, Jones voiced Flower, one of the main characters in the Disneytoon Studios animated drama film Bambi II. From 2007 to 2010, Jones voiced the titular lead character in the Cartoon Network animated comedy series Chowder. He also appeared during a live-action sequence in the 2009 episode "Shopping Spree". In 2010, for his performance as Chowder, Jones was nominated for the Annie Award in the category Voice Acting in a Television Production. He later also reprised his role as Chowder in the 2009 Grigon Entertainment massively multiplayer online game FusionFall. Additionally, in 2008, he also voiced Gumball Waterson in the pilot for the Cartoon Network animated sitcom series The Amazing World of Gumball.

== Filmography ==
Year	Title	Role	Notes
2006	Bambi II	Flower	Feature film; voice
2007–2010	Chowder	Chowder	Television series; lead role; voice; 65 episodes
2007–2010	Chowder	Mr. Tummy	Television series; voice; 4 episodes
2008	The Amazing World of Gumball	Gumball Watterson	Television series; voice; episode: "Pilot"
2008	FusionFall	Chowder	Video game; voice
2008–2009	Chowder	Child	Television series; voice; 3 episodes
2009	Chowder	Baby Minotaur	Television series; voice; episode: "The Deadly Maze"
2009	Chowder	Dog kid	Television series; voice; episode: "The Lollistops"
2009	Chowder	Himself	Television series; episode: "Shopping Spree"
2009	Chowder	Won Ton Bombs	Television series; voice; episode: "Won Ton Bombs"
2010	Chowder	Chowder's brain	Television series; voice; episode: "Chowder Grows Up"

== Accolades and nominations ==
Awards and nominations received by Nicky Jones
Award	Year	Category	Nominated work	Result	Ref.
Annie Awards	2010	Voice Acting in a Television Production	Chowder	Nominated	
