= Bambi =

1942 animated Disney film

- Theatrical release poster
- Directed by: Supervising Director; David D. Hand; Sequence Director: James Algar; Bill Roberts; Norman Wright; Sam Armstrong; Paul Satterfield; Graham Heid
- Story by: Perce Pearce; Larry Morey; George Stallings; Melvin Shaw; Carl Fallberg; Chuck Couch; Ralph Wright
- Based on: Bambi, a Life in the Woods by Felix Salten
- Produced by: Walt Disney
- Music by: Frank Churchill; Edward Plumb
- Production company: Walt Disney Productions
- Distributed by: RKO Radio Pictures
- Release dates: August 9, 1942 (London); August 13, 1942 (United States)
- Running time: 70 minutes
- Country: United States
- Language: English
- Budget: $2 million
- Box office: $267 million

Bambi is a 1942 American animated coming-of-age film produced by Walt Disney and released by RKO Radio Pictures, loosely based on Felix Salten's 1923 novel Bambi, a Life in the Woods. It was directed by David D. Hand, and a team of six sequence directors.

The main characters are Bambi, a white-tailed deer; his parents (the Great Prince of the forest and his unnamed mother); his friends Thumper (a pink-nosed cottontail rabbit) and Flower (a skunk); and his childhood friend and future mate, Faline. In the original book, Bambi was a roe deer, a species native to Europe, but Disney decided to base the character on a mule deer from Arrowhead, California. Illustrator Maurice "Jake" Day convinced Disney that the mule deer had large "mule-like" ears and were more common to western North America, but that the white-tail deer was more recognized throughout the United States. The film received three Academy Award nominations: Best Sound (Sam Slyfield), Best Song (for "Love Is a Song" sung by Donald Novis) and Original Music Score.

In June 2008, the American Film Institute presented a list of its "10 Top 10"—the best ten films in each of ten classic American film genres—after polling over 1,500 people from the creative community. Bambi attained third in animation. In December 2011, the film was selected for preservation in the National Film Registry of the Library of Congress, being deemed "culturally, historically and aesthetically significant". A follow-up, Bambi II, premiered in theaters in Argentina on January 26, 2006, before being released as a direct-to-video title in the United States on February 7, 2006. In January 2020, it was announced that a photorealistic computer-animated remake was set to be in development.

== Plot ==
Deep in the forest, a doe gives birth to a male fawn named Bambi, who will one day take over the position of Great Prince of the Forest, who guards the woodland creatures. Bambi grows up very attached to his mother, with whom he spends most of his time. The fawn is befriended by an eager, energetic male rabbit named Thumper, who helps to teach him to walk and speak, a young male skunk he mistakenly calls "Flower" (who is so flattered, he keeps the name) and a female fawn named Faline. Curious and inquisitive, Bambi frequently asks about the world around him and is cautioned about the dangers of life as a forest creature by his loving mother.

One day out in a meadow, Bambi briefly sees the Great Prince, the oldest and most experienced stag. As the Great Prince wanders uphill, he discovers the human hunter, named "Man" by all the animals, is coming and rushes down to the meadow to get everyone to safety. Bambi is briefly separated from his mother during that time but is escorted to her by the Great Prince as the three of them make it back in the forest just as Man fires his gun.

During Bambi's first winter, he and Thumper play in the snow while Flower hibernates. One day his mother takes him to find food when Man shows up again. As they run off, his mother is shot and killed by the hunter, leaving the little fawn mournful and alone. Taking pity on the abandoned fawn, the Great Prince leads Bambi home as he reveals to him that he is his father.

The following year, Bambi has matured into a young buck, and his childhood friends have also entered young adulthood. They are warned about becoming "twitterpated" by Friend Owl and that they will eventually fall in love, but the trio views the concept of romance with scorn. Thumper and Flower soon meet their beautiful romantic counterparts and abandon their former thoughts on love. Bambi re-encounters Faline, now a beautiful doe; their courtship is soon interrupted by a belligerent older stag named Ronno, who attempts to force Faline away from Bambi. Bambi defeats Ronno in battle and earns the doe's affections.

One day, Bambi is awakened by the smell of smoke, which leads him to a hunter camp. His father warns Bambi that Man has returned with more hunters. In the turmoil, Bambi is separated from Faline, but he finds her cornered by Man's vicious hunting dogs which he manages to ward off. Bambi escapes them and is shot by Man, but survives. Meanwhile, the hunters' campfire suddenly spreads into the forest, causing a wildfire from which the forest residents flee in fear. Bambi, his father, Faline, and the forest animals manage to reach shelter on a riverbank.

The following spring, Faline gives birth to twins under Bambi's watchful eye as the new Great Prince of the Forest.

== Voice cast ==
The voice cast were all unbilled, as was the practice at the time for many animated films.

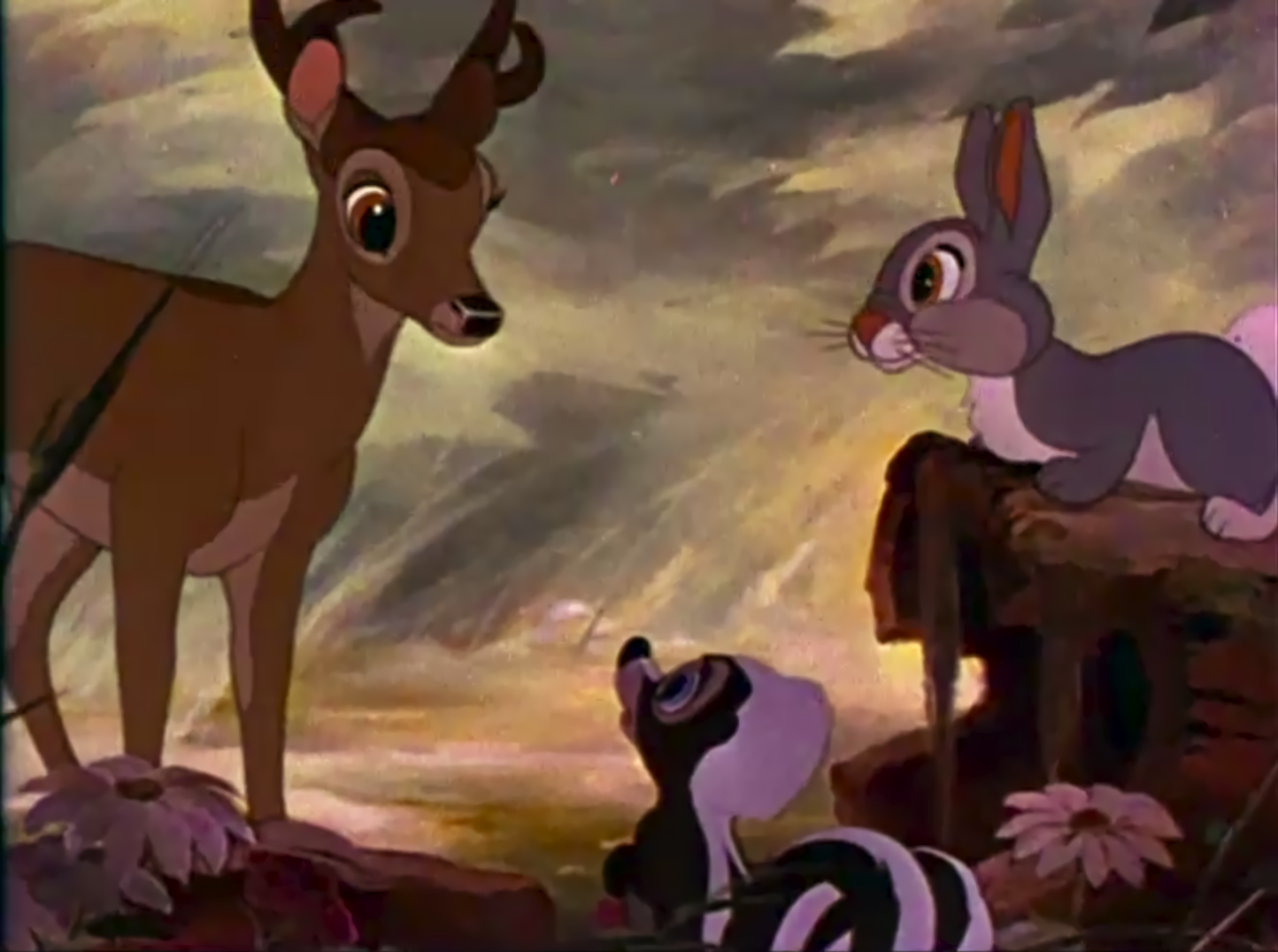
Adolescent Bambi, Thumper, and Flower, from the film's trailer

- Donnie Dunagan as Bambi, the film's title character and protagonist
  - Bobby Stewart as Baby Bambi
  - Hardie Albright as Adolescent Bambi
  - John Sutherland as Adult Bambi (Note: Sources differ on whether Sutherland actually voiced Young Adult Bambi.)
- Peter Behn as Thumper, a rabbit friend of Bambi's
  - Tim Davis as Adolescent Thumper
  - Sam Edwards as Young Adult Thumper
- Paula Winslowe as Bambi's Mother and the Pheasant
- Stan Alexander as Flower, a striped skunk and another friend of Bambi's
  - Tim Davis as Adolescent Flower
  - Sterling Holloway as Young Adult Flower
- Will Wright as Friend Owl
- Cammie King as Faline, a female deer with whom Bambi eventually falls in love
  - Ann Gillis as Adult Faline
- Fred Shields as the Great Prince of the Forest
- Margaret Lee as Mrs. Rabbit
- Mary Lansing as Aunt Ena and Mrs. Possum
- Perce Pearce as Mr. Mole
- Thelma Boardman as Girl Bunny, Quail Mother, Female Pheasant

== Production ==
=== Development ===
In 1933, Sidney Franklin purchased the rights to Felix Salten's novel Bambi, a Life in the Woods (1923) to produce a live-action film for Metro-Goldwyn-Mayer, but soon realized that it would be too difficult to achieve. Joseph M. Schenck of United Artists suggested he make an animated version in alliance with Walt Disney, who was contemplating the idea of his first full-length feature at the time, with Bambi as one of the possible choices before deciding on Snow White and the Seven Dwarfs. Later that year, Franklin approached him with the idea, but Disney eventually refused, feeling that his animation studio was unprepared for the technical difficulties that Bambi would have presented. Franklin sold the film rights to Walt Disney in April 1937. Disney began work on crafting an animated adaptation immediately, intending it to be the company's second feature-length animated film and their first to be based on a specific, recent work. However, the original novel was written for an adult audience, and was considered too "grim" and "somber" for a regular light-hearted Disney film. The artists also discovered that it would be challenging to animate deer realistically. These difficulties resulted in Disney putting production on hold while the studio worked on several other projects, and eventually Pinocchio became the studio's second film. In 1938, Disney assigned Perce Pearce and Carl Fallberg to work on the film's storyboards, but attention was soon drawn away as the studio began working on Fantasia. Finally, on August 17, 1939, production on Bambi began in earnest, but progressed slowly owing to changes in the studio personnel, location, and methodology of handling animation at the time while also starting production on Dumbo to recoup the box-office failures of both Pinocchio and Fantasia.

=== Writing ===
There were many interpretations of the story. As writer and animator Mel Shaw recalled:

The story of Bambi had a so many possibilities, you could go off on a million tangents. I remember one situation when Walt became involved with himself. He said 'Suppose we have Bambi step on an ant hill and we cut inside and see all the damage he's done to the ant civilization'. We spent weeks and weeks developing the ants, and then all of a sudden we decided, you know, we're way off the story, this has got nothing to do with the story of Bambi. We also had a family of grasshoppers, and they get into a family squabble of this or that, and Bambi is watching all of this, and here's the big head of Bambi in the grasshoppers. And what's that got to do with the story, and this would go on many times.

Originally the film was intended to have six individual bunny characters, similar to the dwarfs in Snow White. However, Perce Pearce suggested that they could instead have five generic rabbits and one rabbit with a different color than the rest, with one tooth, would have a very distinct personality. This character later became known as Thumper. There originally was a brief shot in the scene where Bambi's mother dies after jumping over a log and getting shot by a man. Larry Morey, however, felt the scene was too dramatic, and that it was emotional enough to justify having her death occur off screen. Walt Disney was also eager to show the man burned to death by his fire that he inadvertently started, but this was discarded when it was decided not to show the man at all.

There was a scene involving two autumn leaves conversing like an old married couple before parting ways and falling to the ground, but Disney found that talking flora did not work in the context of the film, and instead a visual metaphor of two realistic leaves falling to the ground was used instead. Disney and his story team also developed the characters consisting of a squirrel and a chipmunk that were to be a comic duo reminiscent of Laurel and Hardy. However, after years of experimentation, Walt felt that the story should focus on the three principal characters: Bambi, Thumper and Flower. The squirrel and chipmunk make only brief appearances in the final film. The writing was completed in July 1940, by which time the film's budget had increased to $858,000, with the final budget reaching $2 million.

=== Animation ===
Although the animators had animated deer in Snow White, they were animated, in the words of Eric Larson, "like big flour sacks". Disney wanted the animals in Bambi to be more realistic and expressive than those in Snow White. He had Rico LeBrun, a painter of animals, come and lecture to the animators on the structure and movement of animals. To ensure realistic movement, Disney animators studied animals first-hand by visiting the Los Angeles Zoo and by observing a small, in-studio zoo that included rabbits, owls, skunks, and two fawns named Bambi and Faline. LeBrun's sketches depicted realistic animals, but as characters they lacked personality. Marc Davis created the final design of Bambi by incorporating LeBrun's realistic study of deer anatomy but exaggerating the character's face by making his proportions baby-like (short snout, big eyes, etc.). Although there were no humans in Bambi, live-action footage of humans was used for one scene: actress Jane Randolph and Ice Capades star Donna Atwood acted as live-action references for the scene where Bambi and Thumper are on the icy pond. The animators learned a lot about animals during the film's production, giving them a broader spectrum of animation styles to use in future projects.

The backgrounds for the film were inspired by the Eastern American woodlands. One of the earliest and best-known artists for the Disney studio, Maurice "Jake" Day, spent several weeks in the Vermont and Maine forests, sketching and photographing deer, fawns, and the surrounding wilderness areas. However, his first sketches were too "busy" as the eye did not know where to focus. Tyrus Wong, a Chinese-American animator, showed Day some of his impressionistic paintings of a forest. Day liked the paintings and appointed him as a background artist for the film. Wong's backgrounds were revolutionary since they had more detail around the center and less around the edges, thus leading a viewer's eye to the characters. Due to World War II, which began in Europe in 1939, Pinocchio and Fantasia failed at the box office. Facing financial difficulty, Disney was forced to cut 12 minutes from the film before final animation to save production costs.

== Music ==
Bambi

Studio album by Edward H. Plumb and Frank Churchill
- Released: 1942
- Label: Disneyland Records

All lyrics are written by Larry Morey; all music is composed by Frank Churchill.

No.	Title	Performer(s)	Length
1.	"Love Is a Song"	Donald Novis
2.	"Little April Shower"	Disney Studio Chorus
3.	"Let's Sing a Gay Little Spring Song"	Disney Studio Chorus
4.	"Looking for Romance (I Bring You a Song)"	Donald Novis & the Disney Studio Chorus

== Release ==
=== Original theatrical run ===
The film's 1942 theatrical trailer

Bambi had its world premiere in London on August 9, 1942 at the New Gallery Cinema, the first Disney film to debut abroad. It was released in theaters in United States five days later, on August 13. The film was released during World War II and did not perform as well as hoped. Roy O. Disney sent a telegram to his brother Walt after the New York opening of the film that read: "Fell short of our holdover figure by $4,000. Just came from Music Hall. Unable to make any deal to stay third week ... Night business is our problem." The film earned RKO theatrical rentals of $1,270,000 in the United States and Canada in its initial release. Disney lacked access to much of the European market during the war, but the film earned rentals of $1,685,000 internationally for an initial worldwide total of $2,955,000, Disney's third-highest, behind Snow White and the Seven Dwarfs (1937) with $7.8 million and Pinocchio (1940) with $3.2 million.

=== Re-releases ===
The film was re-released to theatres in the United States in 1947, 1957, 1966, 1975, 1982 and 1988. In its first reissue in the United States in 1947, the film earned additional domestic rentals of $900,000 but did much better 10 years later, more than doubling the domestic rental total with a further $2.5 million, taking its total domestic rental earnings to $4.7 million. The film earned $14 million in domestic rentals from its reissues in 1966 and 1975, giving it a total domestic rental of $18,735,000, which equates to a gross of around $40 million. In 1982, it grossed another $23 million in the United States and Canada, and in 1988 a further $39 million, taking its total in the United States and Canada to $102 million, making it (at the time) the second highest-grossing animated movie of all-time after Snow White and the Seven Dwarfs. With grosses from international reissues, the film has a worldwide gross of $267 million. On August 18, 2023, Bambi was re-released in cinemas across the UK for one week as part of Disney's 100th anniversary.

=== Home media ===
Prior to Bambi's initial release on home video on September 28, 1989, initial orders placed in the United States and Canada up to the end of August totaled 9.8 million units, the second largest number of orders for a video at the time, behind E.T. the Extra-Terrestrial, with a wholesale value of $167 million. Even in home video, it has seen multiple releases, including three VHS releases — in 1989 (Classics Version), 1997 (Masterpiece Collection Version), and 2005 (Platinum Edition version), one Betamax release in 1989 (Classics version), two Laserdisc releases in 1989 (Classics version) and 1997 (Masterpiece Collection version). In 2005, a digitally remastered and restored Platinum Edition DVD was released; it went on moratorium on January 31, 2007.

Bambi was released as a Diamond Edition on March 1, 2011, consisting of a Blu-ray and DVD combo pack. This release included multiple bonus features not previously included in Bambi home releases: a documentary entitled Inside Walt's Story Meetings – Enhanced Edition, two deleted scenes, a deleted song, an image gallery, and a game entitled Disney's Big Book of Knowledge: Bambi Edition. This release also marked the first use of "Disney Second Screen", a feature which is accessed via a computer or iPad app download that syncs with the Blu-ray disc, allowing the viewer to follow along by interacting with animated flip-books, galleries and trivia while watching the movie. A UK version of Diamond Edition was released on February 7, 2011. In honor of the film's 75th anniversary, Bambi was released as part of the Walt Disney Signature Collection on May 23, 2017 (digital) and June 6, 2017 (Blu-ray/DVD/digital combo pack).

=== Localization ===
On the initiative of Stephen Greymoming, professor of Native American studies and anthropology at the University of Montana, an Arapaho-language dubbing of the movie was produced in 1994, in collaboration with the Northern Plains Educational Foundation. The final product was only a partial dubbing, as the spoken parts were dubbed in Arapaho, but all the songs were left in English. The dubbed version of the movie premiered on November 3 the same year, and Disney later provided the Arapaho Nation with 2000 VHS tapes of the movie. The dubbing was never issued again in any other forms, until it was uploaded on the streaming platform Disney+ in October 2022. Bambi was the first of three Disney movies to receive a dubbing in a Native American language. The next such instance had to wait until 2016, when Pixar's Finding Nemo received a dubbing in Navajo, and then Disney's Moana in Hawaiian two years later. While the first was also made available on Disney+, the latter was only distributed for free in schools in Hawaii, and never received any home media release form.

== Reception ==
=== Critical response ===
At the time of the film's release, Bambi received mixed reviews from the critics, mainly because of the lack of fantasy elements in the film and objection towards a dramatic story of animals and their struggle to survive in the woods and avoid the threat of humans. The New York Times claimed that "In the search for perfection, Mr. Disney has come perilously close to tossing away his whole world of cartoon fantasy." Manny Farber of The New Republic wrote that "Bambi is interesting because it's the first one that's been entirely unpleasant" and that "Mickey wouldn't be caught dead in this". Farber added that "In an attempt to ape the trumped-up realism of flesh and blood movies, he has given up fantasy, which was pretty much the magic element." Even Disney's daughter Diane complained, saying that Bambi's mother did not need to die. When Walt claimed that he was only following the book, Diane protested, saying that he had taken other liberties before and that Walt Disney could do whatever he wanted. Outdoor Life published an editorial criticising the film for its allegedly inaccurate and villainous portrayal of hunters. The editor stated that shooting Bambi's mother in the spring would have violated hunting regulations and that the film neglected hunters' contributions to conservation.

Into the 21st century, Bambi is viewed much more favorably. On the review aggregation website Rotten Tomatoes, 91% of 55 critics' reviews are positive, with an average rating of 8.5/10. The website's consensus reads, "Elegantly animated and deeply touching, Bambi is an enduring, endearing, and moving Disney classic." Metacritic, which uses a weighted average, assigned the film a score of 91 out of 100, based on 16 critics, indicating "universal acclaim". Critics Mick Martin and Marsha Porter call the film "the crowning achievement of Walt Disney's animation studio". English film historian Leslie Halliwell wrote that Bambi was "one of Disney's most memorable and brilliant achievements with a great comic character in Thumper and a climactic forest fire sequence that is genuinely thrilling." He concluded that it was "a triumph of the animator's arts".

=== Accolades ===
Award	Category	Nominee(s)	Result
Academy Awards	Best Scoring of a Dramatic or Comedy Picture	Frank Churchill and Edward H. Plumb	Nominated
Academy Awards	Best Original Song	"Love Is a Song"; Music by Frank Churchill; Lyrics by Larry Morey	Nominated
Academy Awards	Best Sound Recording	C. O. Slyfield	Nominated
Genesis Awards	Feature Film – Classic		Won
Golden Globe Awards	Special Achievement Award	Walt Disney	Won
Hugo Awards	Best Dramatic Presentation – Short Form	Perce Pearce, Larry Morey and David D. Hand	Won
National Film Preservation Board	National Film Registry		Inducted
Online Film & Television Association Awards	Hall of Fame – Motion Picture		Inducted
Satellite Awards	Outstanding Youth DVD		Nominated

In June 2008, the American Film Institute revealed its "10 Top 10" – the best ten films in ten classic American film genres – after polling over 1,500 people from the creative community. Bambi was acknowledged as the third best film in the animation genre. It is also listed in the Top 25 Horror Movies of All Time by Time magazine. Bambi, Time states, "has a primal shock that still haunts oldsters who saw it 40, 50, 65 years ago."

American Film Institute

- AFI's 100 Years... 100 Movies – Nominated
- AFI's 100 Years... 100 Heroes and Villains:
  - Man – No. 20 Villain
- AFI's 100 Years of Film Scores – Nominated
- AFI's 100 Years... 100 Movies (10th Anniversary Edition) – Nominated
- AFI's 10 Top 10 – No. 3 Animated film

== Legacy ==
The off-screen villain "Man" has been placed No. 20 on AFI's List of Heroes and Villains. Some critics have cited parallels between Frank Churchill's theme music for "Man" (which consisted of three simple notes) and John Williams's theme music in Jaws (which consists of two notes). Kathryn Schulz of The New Yorker stated that due to the film becoming far more prominent than the book, it "rendered [Felix Salten] virtually unknown." According to Schulz, the film also made the original novel, which was previously given prominent attention and discussed, "obscure". Paul McCartney has credited the shooting death of Bambi's mother for his initial interest in animal rights.

Soon after the film's release, Walt Disney allowed his characters to appear in fire prevention public service campaigns. However, Bambi was only loaned to the government for a year, so a new symbol was needed, leading to the creation of Smokey Bear. Bambi and his mother also make a cameo appearance in the satirical 1955 Donald Duck short No Hunting: drinking from a forest stream, the deer are startled by a sudden trickle of beer cans and other debris, and Bambi's mother tells him, "Man is in the forest. Let's dig out."

In 2006, the Ad Council, in partnership with the United States Forest Service, started a series of Public Service Announcements that feature footage from Bambi for wildfire prevention. During the ads, as the Bambi footage is shown, the screen will momentarily fade into black with the text "Don't let our forests become...once upon a time", and usually (but not always) ending the ads with Bambi's line "Mother, what we gonna do today?" followed by Smokey Bear saying "Only you can prevent wildfires" as the Smokey logo is shown on the screen. Bambi had previously been the Forest Service's advertising icon beginning in 1942, but was only allowed by Disney to use the character for a year.

In December 2011, Bambi was among the films selected for preservation in the Library of Congress' National Film Registry. In its induction, the Registry said that the film was one of Walt Disney's favorites and that it has been "recognized for its eloquent message of nature conservation." Characters of the film appear in several other Disney media, such as guest appearances in the animated television series House of Mouse, Bambi being a character to summon in the video game Kingdom Hearts and its sequel Kingdom Hearts: Chain of Memories, and Bambi, Thumper, Flower, Faline and Great Prince of the Forest being playable characters in Disney Magic Kingdoms. On December 17, 2018, a prison sentence passed against a man, in what is considered the biggest deer poaching case in Missouri history, contained the stipulation that the prisoner must view the film at least once each month during his one-year prison sentence.

== Media and merchandise ==
=== Comic adaptation ===
The Silly Symphony Sunday comic strip ran a three-month-long adaptation of Bambi from July 19 to October 4, 1942.

=== Follow-up ===
A follow-up, Bambi II, was released in 2006. Set in the middle of Bambi, Bambi II shows the Great Prince of the Forest struggling to raise the motherless Bambi, and Bambi's doubts about his father's love. While the film was a direct-to-video release in the United States and other countries, including Canada, China, Hong Kong, Japan and Taiwan, it was a theatrical release in some countries, including Australia, Austria, Brazil, Dominican Republic, France, Mexico, the United Kingdom and some other European countries.

=== Potential CGI remake ===
On January 28, 2020, it was announced that a photorealistic CGI feature-length remake is in development with a script co-written by Geneva Robertson-Dworet and Lindsey Beer. Paul Weitz, Chris Weitz, and Andrew Miano would produce the film; a joint-venture production between Walt Disney Pictures, Depth of Field Studios, and Known Universe Productions. Disney described the film as a "companion piece" to The Jungle Book (2016) and The Lion King (2019), as the three films feature wildlife that requires extensive CGI and special effects. On June 13, 2023, it was revealed that Sarah Polley was in talks to direct the film, which was said to be a musical that will feature music from six-time Grammy-winning country star Kacey Musgraves. Micah Fitzerman-Blue and Noah Harpster wrote the most recent draft of the script. In March 2024, Polley was reportedly no longer attached as director. There has been no further news about the project since then.

== Copyright ==
The copyrights for Bambi, a Life in the Woods were inherited by Anna Wyler, Salten's daughter, who renewed them in 1954. After her death, Wyler's husband sold the rights to Twin Books, a publishing company which subsequently filed a lawsuit against Disney, claiming Disney owed it money for the continued licensing for the use of the book. Disney countered by claiming that Salten had published the story in 1923 without a copyright notice, thus it immediately entered into the public domain. Disney also argued that if the claimed 1923 publication date was accurate, then the copyright renewal filed in 1954 had been registered after the deadline and was thus invalid. The courts initially upheld Disney's view; however, in 1996, the Ninth Circuit Court reversed the decision on appeal in Twin Books Corp. v. Walt Disney Co., 83 F.3d 1162 (1996). The American copyright of the novel expired on January 1, 2022.

== Bibliography ==
- Barrier, Michael (1999). Hollywood Cartoons: American Animation in Its Golden Age. Oxford University Press. ISBN 978-0-1980-2079-0.
- Beck, Jerry (2005). The Animated Movie Guide. Chicago Review Press. ISBN 978-1-5565-2591-9.
- Gabler, Neal (2006). Walt Disney: The Triumph of the American Imagination. Vintage Books. ISBN 978-0-6797-5747-4.
- Kaufman, J. B. (2012). The Fairest One of All: The Making of Walt Disney's Snow White and the Seven Dwarfs. Weldon Owen. ISBN 978-1-61628-438-1.
- Smith, Dave (1996). Disney A to Z: The Official Encyclopedia. Disney Editions. ISBN 978-0-7868-6223-8.
- Smith, Dave (2012). Disney Trivia from the Vault: Secrets Revealed and Questions Answered. Disney Editions. ISBN 978-1-4231-7857-6.
- Wills, John (2015). "Felix Salten's Stories: The Portrayal of Nature in Bambi, Perri and The Shaggy Dog". In Jackson, Kathy Merloch; West, Mark I. (eds.). Walt Disney, from Reader to Storyteller: Essays on the Literary Inspirations. Jefferson (N.C.): McFarland. pp. 45–61. ISBN 978-0-7864-7232-1.
