= Makenna Cowgill =

American child actress (born 1998)

- Born: September 11, 1998 (age 28)
- Occupations: Actress, voice actress
- Years active: 2006–2020

Makenna Cowgill (born September 11, 1998) is an American former child actress. She has provided voices for many animated and non-animated movies.

== Filmography ==
- Bambi II (2006)
- Meet the Robinsons (2007)
- The Time Traveler's Wife (2009)
- Diary of a Wimpy Kid (2010)
- Diary of a Wimpy Kid: Rodrick Rules
- Kung Fu Panda 2
- Astro Boy
- Madagascar: Escape 2 Africa
- Madagascar 3: Europe's Most Wanted"
- Monster House
- Megamind
- Monsters University
- Kung Fu Panda Holiday
- Monsters vs. Aliens: Mutant Pumpkins from Outer Space
- NCIS
- CSI
- Modern Family
- Sordid Lives
