= Thumper (Bambi) =

Disney Bambi character

- Thumper, as he appears in the film Bambi
- First appearance: Bambi; August 9, 1942
- Created by: Marc Davis
- Voiced by: Peter Behn (young); Tim Davis (adolescent); Sam Edwards (young adult); (Bambi); Brendon Baerg (Bambi II)
- Species: Rabbit
- Family: Mr. Hare (father); Mrs. Hare (mother); Trixie, Daisy, Ria, and Tessie (sisters)
- Spouse: Miss Bunny
- Children: Unnamed daughters

Thumper is a fictional cottontail rabbit character from Disney's animated film Bambi (1942). He is known and named for his habit of thumping his left hind foot.

The character was an important influence upon the development of the movie Bambi which started production with an adult tone which seemed too serious and uncommercial. As voiced by the young actor, four-year-old Peter Behn, the vivacious character of Thumper was expanded from its original minor role and led to a focus upon the young animals in the story.

Thumper is Disney's adaptation of Friend Hare from Felix Salten's 1923 novel Bambi, a Life in the Woods. The personality and visual appearance of the character was based upon Beatrix Potter's Benjamin Bunny. Unlike real rabbits, Thumper is drawn with paw pads, a feature that most rabbits lack.

Disney Consumer Products started a spin-off franchise, Disney Bunnies, with Thumper as the main character.

The young adult version of Thumper also appears at the Walt Disney Parks and Resorts alongside Miss Bunny as a meetable character in Fantasyland and at Disney’s Animal Kingdom.

== Film appearances ==
=== Bambi ===
The character Thumper first appears in the film Bambi, watching as Bambi is first presented as the young prince to the creatures of the forest. He remarks that Bambi is "kinda wobbly" but is reproved by his mother, who makes him repeat what his father had impressed upon him that morning, "If you can't say something nice, don't say nothing at all". This moral is now known by such names as the "Thumperian principle", "Thumper's rule" or "Thumper's law".

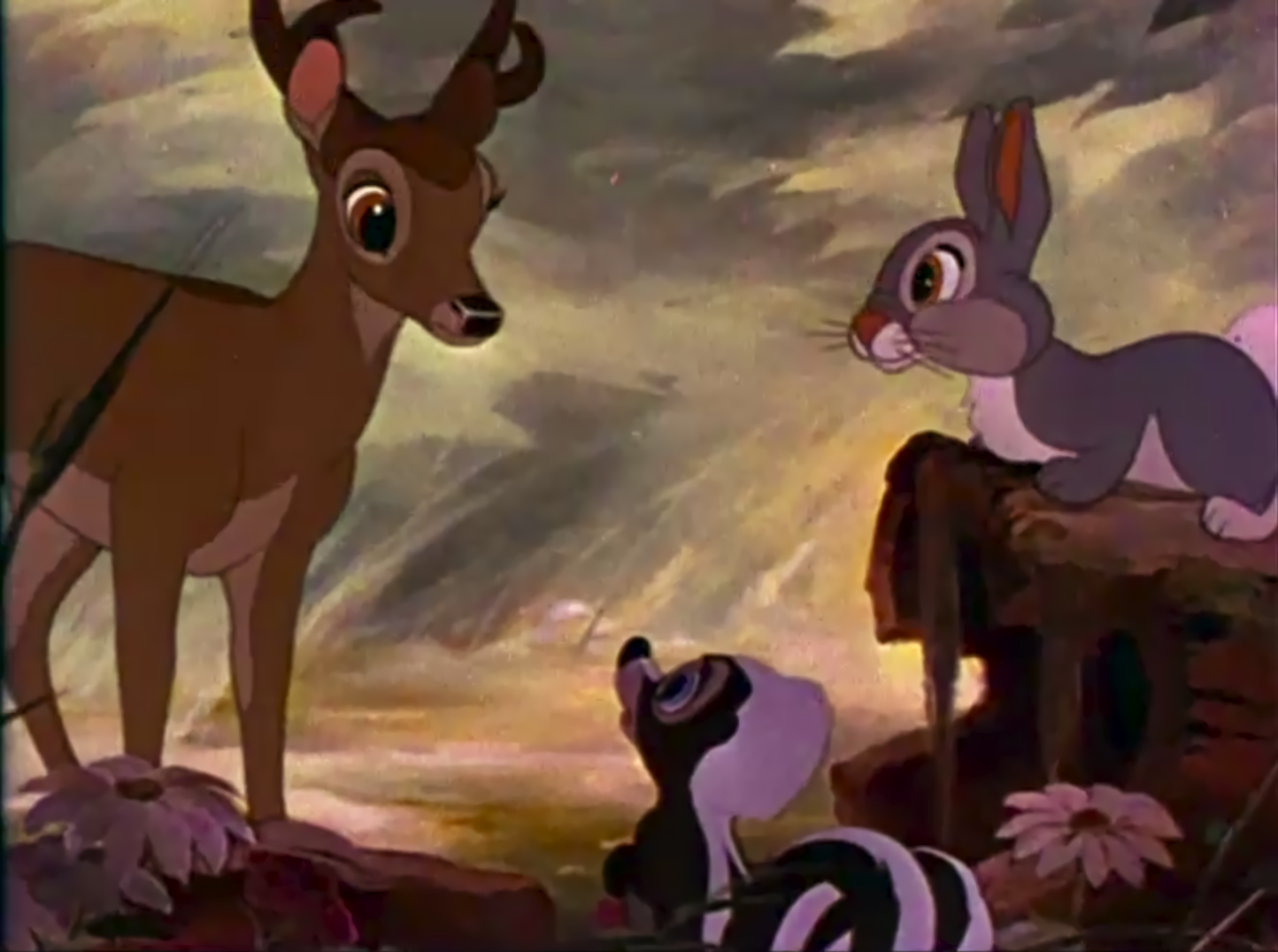
Adolescent Thumper, along with his friends Bambi (deer) and Flower (skunk).

A few days later a still-wobbly Bambi was out with his mother when they re-encountered Thumper, who took it upon himself to teach the fawn various tricks, notably that of speech. He succeeded in teaching Bambi a few words, notably "bird" and "flower" which Bambi accidentally used to name a young skunk. Thumper tried to correct Bambi but the skunk said, "That's alright. He can call me Flower if he wants to. I don't mind". The three animals go on to become friends and this encounter provides another moral lesson in the virtues of tolerance and an easy disposition.

In the winter, Thumper tries to teach Bambi how to skate on the ice but Bambi is wobbly again.

=== Bambi II ===
In Bambi II, Thumper again appears hiding from his sisters and trying to help Bambi learn to be brave in the hopes of impressing his dad. Thumper is the main protagonist in a video storybook, Thumper Goes Exploring, which was released with the Platinum Edition of Bambi on March 1, 2005.

=== Other films ===
The young adult version of Thumper can be seen amongst the crowd of toons during the final scene of the 1988 film Who Framed Roger Rabbit. The title character also mentions that his Uncle Thumper has problems with his "probate", for which he "had to take these big pills, and drink lots of water" (it's unknown if both Thumpers are the same character).

Thumper is one of the several Walt Disney Animation Studios characters that appears in the 2023 short film Once Upon a Studio.

=== Video games ===
Thumper appears as a playable character in the video game Disney Magic Kingdoms.

== Metaphorical and military usage ==
Thumper is used as a metaphor for a cuddly pet when referring to women. "'Bambi" and "Thumper" are the names of two female bodyguards in the 1971 James Bond film Diamonds Are Forever. In the book House of Leaves, Johnny Truant works in a tattoo parlor, and once he develops feelings for one of the regular clients, he gives her the nickname "Thumper".

The name "Thumper" is given to a snake that Andy Pipkin gets Lou to buy instead of a rabbit in Little Britain.

The name "Thumper" was used by an American B-29 Superfortress during World War II, tail code A21, serial number 42-24623. Assigned to the 497th Bombardment Group's 870th Squadron, the aircraft featured a painting of the cartoon rabbit on its side, with Thumper shown thumping on a bomb similar to the way his foot is hitting the ground in the film. The "Thumper" B-29 Superfortress flew 44 missions during the air raids on Japan, participating in the bombing of Tokyo and Nagoya. It survived the war.
