= Janet Schulman =

American author and editor

Janet Schulman (16 September 1933 – 11 February 2011) was an important figure in the children's publishing industry, ultimately serving as the Publisher, Vice President, and Editor-in-Chief of the Juvenile division of Random House. In addition, she wrote numerous books for children, compiled two best-selling anthologies of classic children's literature, was a vocal advocate for gender equality in publishing and a proponent for greater diversity and inclusion in children's books.

== Career ==
Schulman's publishing career began in 1961 when she joined the advertising department of Macmillan Publishers in New York, where she ultimately became Vice President of Children's Book Marketing. At Macmillan she brought The Chronicles of Narnia books by C. S. Lewis' to the United States and was able to market Watership Down, to an adult audience and the New York Times bestseller list. She targeted a wider audience both through the creation of a paperback line of children's books that were more affordable than the hardcovers that were industry-standard at the time, and by supporting authors whose work reflected the racial diversity of the country. In addition to established authors like Ezra Jack Keats, whose books depicting African American kids won several awards, she helped Virginia Hamilton (a personal friend) to publish her first books of "Liberation Literature."

In 1973, although the children's division was thriving, Schulman remained paid far less than the male vice presidents in the company, less even than male marketing managers. After giving birth in 1968 she had been obliged to return to work after only two weeks. When she discovered that she had been denied the maternity benefits that the wives of her male colleagues received it was "the final straw." She became the co-chairperson of the Macmillan's women's group and filed a class action complaint for sex discrimination on May 14, 1974. The State Attorney charged Macmillan in September. The following month Janet Schulman was given one hour to clear her office, summarily fired along with nine of the other signatories to the complaint and most of the women's group. The sudden mass firing of almost 200 employees made front page headlines in the New York Times and was met by demonstrations and the resignation of both the Editor in Chief and Managing Editor of the children's book division. In an interview, Schulman said about her firing: "I have maintained all along that I was fired because of my activities helping to form and acting as co-chair of the women's group in the company." The Attorney General agreed and filed a complaint against the company for unlawful retaliation against her for her activities with the women's group. Further investigation by the State Division of Human Rights led to a settlement in 1976, obliging the company to offer equal pay and benefits regardless of sex as well as the integration of women into positions (like sales reps) from which they had been excluded.

After the firing, Schulman spent several years as a freelancer. She wrote seven Read-Alone books for Greenwillow—the new imprint founded by her former colleague Susan Hirschman, the Editor in Chief who had quit Macmillan in solidarity. She also abridged a number of classic children's books for Caedmon Records, as part of their audiobook library. In 1978 Random House hired her as the director of marketing and she ultimately became the Publisher and Editor in Chief of their juvenile division (in addition to that of their subsidiaries, Pantheon and Knopf). There she worked with some of the biggest authors in the industry (such as Dr. Seuss, the Berenstains, Richard Scarry, Judy Sierra, Marc Brown, among many others). At Random House she created several anthologies of children's literature, most notably The 20th-Century Children's Book Treasury: Picture Books and Stories to Read Aloud and You Read to Me & I'll Read to You: Stories to Share from the 20th Century Although she resigned from working full time in 1994, she continued to work part time, both editing and writing as a VP at large until she died.

== Death ==
Schulman died on 11 February 2011, in New York City. She was 77 years old.

== Selected works ==
- Schulman, Janet (1976). The Big Hello. Greenwillow Books. ISBN 068880036X.
- Schulman, Janet (1977). Jack the Bum and the Haunted House.
- Schulman, Janet (1977). Jack the Bum and the Halloween Handout.
- Schulman, Janet (1978). Jack the Bum and the UFO. New York.
- Schulman, Janet (1978). Jenny and the Tennis Nut. New York.
- Schulman, Janet (1979). Camp Keewee's Secret Weapon.
- Schulman, Janet (1991). The Nutcracker. Harper Collins. ISBN 0060278145.
- Schulman, Janet (1998). The 20th Century Children's Book Treasury: Celebrated Picture Books and Stories to Read Aloud.
- Schulman, Janet (1999). Felix Salten's Bambi (1st ed.). New York. ISBN 9780689819544.
- Schulman, Janet (2001). You Read to Me & I'll Read to You: 20th-Century Stories to Share.
- Schulman, Janet (2002). Countdown to Spring: An Animal Counting Book. Alfred A. Knopf. ISBN 9780375813641.
- Schulman, Janet (2003). A Bunny for All Seasons (1st ed.). New York: Alfred A. Knopf. ISBN 9780375822568.
- Schulman, Janet (2004). Sergei Prokofiev's Peter and the Wolf (1st ed.). New York. ISBN 0375824308.
- Schulman, Janet (2005). 10 Trick-or-Treaters (1st ed.). New York. ISBN 0375832254.
- Schulman, Janet (2008). Pale Male: Citizen Hawk of New York City (1st ed.). New York. ISBN 978-0375945588.
- Schulman, Janet (2010). 10 10 Trim-the-Tree'ers (1st ed.). New York. ISBN 978-0375866586.
- Schulman, Janet (2011). 10 10 Easter Egg Hunters (1st ed.). New York. ISBN 978-0375867873.
