= Garrick Dowhen =

American actor and screenwriter

Garrick Storm Dowhen (born December 21, 1945) is an American actor and screenwriter, active as an actor mainly in the 1980s and early 1990s.

Dark-haired and chisel-jawed, he frequently portrayed Frenchmen. He appeared in series such as Remington Steele, as Yves in General Hospital and as a French actor in Days of Our Lives. He also appeared in the French films Le grand carnaval and La vie est un roman in 1983 at the beginning of his career and played the central character in the 1985 horror film Appointment with Fear as an Ancient Egyptian spirit in a mental ward, intent on killing his own baby. He also played an American ski instructor in Just the Way You Are (1984) and played a leading role as Anderson opposite Deborah Rennard in the science fiction film Land of Doom in 1986.
