= Richard Fancy =

American actor and comedian

- Born: August 2, 1943 (age 83); Evanston, Illinois, U.S.
- Occupations: Actor; comedian
- Years active: 1984–present
- Children: 2

Richard Ronald Fancy (born August 2, 1943) is an American actor and comedian known for his recurring role on Seinfeld as publisher Mr. Lippman, Elaine Benes's employer. He has also gained recognition for his role as High Priest Caiaphas in The Chosen.

== Early life ==
Fancy was born August 2, 1943, in Evanston, Illinois, to salesman Raymond Chester Fancy and a radio performer mother. Fancy is named after his paternal grandmother, Magdelene Richard.

== Career ==
Fancy appeared on the third and fourth seasons of It's Garry Shandling's Show as network boss Mr. Stravely. He also plays the priest in the 1991 film What About Bob? and was Kevin Arnold's high school principal, Dr. Valenti, in the fourth and fifth seasons of The Wonder Years. He also appeared in Oliver Stone's Nixon (1995) and Primal Force (1999). He played Sector Control in the Sliders episode "Please Press One."

He had two memorable appearances in late 2005 on Boston Legal, as a crooked Catholic priest; as mob financier Bernie Abrahms on General Hospital (2006–2012), (and also as his brother, Bennie, from 1997 to 2003). He acted in two Star Trek series, playing Captain Satelk in the Star Trek: The Next Generation episode "The First Duty" and as an alien ancestor of Commander Chakotay in the Star Trek: Voyager episode "Tattoo".

== Personal life ==
Fancy is married to Joanna Fass; they have two children.

== Filmography ==
=== Film ===
Year	Title	Role	Notes
1988	The Silence at Bethany	Elam Swope	
1988	Sunset	Academy Speaker	
1988	Spellbinder	Sgt. Barry	
1989	True Believer	Ballistics Expert	
1989	Identity Crisis	Yves Malmaison	
1989	Tango & Cash	Nolan	
1991	Flight of the Intruder	Intelligence Captain	
1991	What About Bob?	Minister	
1994	Clifford	Detective	
1995	Species	Hospital Doctor	
1995	Nixon	Mel Laird	
1996	Lawnmower Man 2: Beyond Cyberspace	Senator Greenspan	
1997	Touch	Judge	
1997	'Til There Was You	Murdstone	
1997	Eat Your Heart Out	Mr. Haus	
1998	Ted	Father	
1999	Being John Malkovich	Johnson Heyward	
2000	Psycho Beach Party	Dr. Wentworth / Dr. Edwards	
2000	3 Strikes	Captain	
2002	Moonlight Mile	Mr. Meyerson	
2004	The Girl Next Door	Mr. Peterson	
2005	Shopgirl	Eli	
2005	Hollywoodland	Alford "Rip" Van Ronkel	
2006	Midnight Clear	Pastor Mark	
2007	Halloween	University Dean	Uncredited
2008	The Onion Movie	Kenneth Garber	
2008	Adventures of Power	Dick Houston	
2012	The Lords of Salem	AJ Kennedy	

=== Television ===
Year	Title	Role	Notes
1984	George Washington	Sam Adams	Miniseries
1986	One Life to Live	Jonathan	Episode #1.4545
1986	George Washington II: The Forging of a Nation	William Duer	Television film
1986	The Art of Being Nick	Depressed customer	Television film
1987	Starman	Principal Kevin Altman	Episode: "The Test"
1987	Beauty and the Beast	Worker #1	Episode: "Once Upon a Time in the City of New York"
1987	Who's the Boss?	Minister	Episode: "There Goes the Bride"
1987	I Married Dora	Zane	Episode: "West Coast Story"
1987–1993	L.A. Law	Norman Klein	3 episodes
1988	Newhart	Man	Episode: "The Big Uneasy"
1988	227	Mr. Hauser	Episode: "A Funny Thing Happened on the Way to the Pageant"
1988–1992	It's Garry Shandling's Show	Various roles	9 episodes
1988, 1992	Empty Nest	Congressman / Lieutenant	2 episodes
1989	From the Dead of Night	Dr. Stanley Breedlove	Television film
1989	Nick Knight	Capt. Brunetti	Television film
1990	Without Her Consent	Strathom	Television film
1990	ALF	Colonel Halsey	Episode: "Consider Me Gone"
1990	Equal Justice	Mr. Howsen	Episode: "The Art of the Possible"
1990	Gabriel's Fire	Prosecuting Attorney	Episode: "I'm Nobody"
1990	Call Me Anna	Contract Lawyer	Television film
1991	Top of the Heap	Fred Epstein	Episode: "The Agony and the Agony"
1991	Absolute Strangers	Justice Richard Marino	Television film
1991	Nurses	Dr. Moss	3 episodes
1991–1992	Doogie Howser, M.D.	Howard Stewart	2 episodes
1991–1998	Seinfeld	Lippman	10 episodes
1992	P.S. I Luv U	Dr. Anderson	Episode: "The Chameleon"
1992	Murphy Brown	Senator Warren Thatcher	Episode: "Send in the Clowns"
1992	The Wonder Years	Dr. Valenti	2 episodes
1992	Civil Wars	Dr. Chodosh	2 episodes
1992	Star Trek: The Next Generation	Capt. Satelk	Episode: "The First Duty"
1992	Afterburn	Stephen Grant	Television film
1993	And the Band Played On	Michael Gottlieb	Television film
1993	The Last Outlaw	Banker McClintock	Television film
1993	Lois & Clark: The New Adventures of Superman	Dr. Saxon	Episode: "The Man of Steel Bars"
1994	Weird Science	Wayne Donnelly	2 episodes
1994	Roswell	Doctor	Television film
1994	Untamed Love	Harold Sherman	Television film
1994	All-American Girl	Wallace	Episode: "Booktopus"
1995	The O. J. Simpson Story	Ed Ledbetter	Television film
1995	Get Smart	Dr. Mendelsohn	Episode: "Liver Let Die"
1995	Dream On	Mr. Copeland	Episode: "Beam Me Up, Dr. Spock"
1995	Star Trek: Voyager	Alien	Episode: "Tattoo"
1995	Party of Five	Sam Arbogast	Episode: "Where There's Smoke"
1995	Land's End	Allen Raffin	Episode: "What Ever Happened to Maria Rosa?"
1996	Innocent Victims	Richard Tasman	Television film
1996	Space: Above and Beyond	E. Allen Wayne	Episode: "...Tell Our Moms We Done Our Best"
1996	Dark Skies	James V. Forrestal	Episode: "Moving Targets"
1996	Common Law	Martin Gutenhimmel	2 episodes
1996, 1998	Diagnosis: Murder	Harold F. Lomax / Stu Havlik	2 episodes
1997	Orleans	Vincent Carraze	2 episodes
1997	ER	Mr. Thomas	Episode: "Tribes"
1997	Murder One	Arthur Sackheim	Episode: "Chapter Sixteen, Year Two"
1997	Veronica's Closet	The Judge	Episode: "Veronica's Best Buddy"
1997	Union Square	Judge	Episode: "Harassed"
1997	3rd Rock from the Sun	Judge DeBelko	2 episodes
1997	Friends	Mr. Posner	Episode: "The One Where They're Going to Party!"
1997	Murder One: Diary of a Serial Killer	Arthur Sackheim	6 episodes
1997–2003	General Hospital	Benny Abrahms	recurring
1998	The Nanny	Chandler Evans	Episode: "Immaculate Concepcion"
1998	Richie Rich's Christmas Wish	Mr. Van Dough	Television film
1999	Primal Force	Deutsch	Television film
1999	The Norm Show	Mr. Boardman	Episode: "Norm, Crusading Social Worker"
1999	Sliders	Sector Control	Episode: "Please Press One"
1999	Come On Get Happy: The Partridge Family Story	Harold	Television film
2000	The Hughleys	Dr. Van Zandt	Episode: "Death Takes a Three Day Holiday"
2000	City of Angels	Judge	Episode: "Cry Me a Liver"
2000	The West Wing	Congressman	Episode: "The White House Pro-Am"
2000	Bull	Geoff Aull	Episode: "What the Past Will Bring"
2000	Gilmore Girls	Allen Prescott	Episode: "Forgiveness and Stuff"
2000–2004	The District	Bruce Logan	13 episodes
2001, 2007	Crossing Jordan	Judge Dixon / Joseph Wolk	2 episodes
2003	The Lyon's Den	Senior Partner	Episode: "Separation Anxiety"
2003	Carnivàle	Psychiatrist	2 episodes
2004	Las Vegas	Palmer	Episode: "You Can't Take It with You"
2004	NYPD Blue	Howard Seigal	Episode: "You're Buggin' Me"
2005	Eyes	Judge	Episode: "Whereabouts"
2005	McBride: The Doctor Is Out... Really Out	George Prescott	Television film
2005	Numbers	Thomas Galway	Episode: "Calculated Risk"
2005	Boston Legal	Father Michael Ryan	2 episodes
2006-2012	General Hospital	Bernie Abrahms	recurring
2007	The Class	Doctor	Episode: "The Class Goes Back to the Hospital"
2007	The Closer	Bob Lewis	Episode: "Dumb Luck"
2009	Better Off Ted	Better Off Ted	Episode: "Through Rose Colored HAZMAT Suits"
2009	Party Down	Gerald Lynch	Episode: "Investors Dinner"
2009	Uncorked	Milton	Television film
2010	Men of a Certain Age	Mr. Fisher	Episode: "You Gonna Do That the Rest of Your Life?"
2011	Cinema Verite	Network President	Television film
2011	Melissa & Joey	Lehman Walken	Episode: "All Politics is Locals"
2012	Mad Men	Max Rosenberg	Episode: "Dark Shadows"
2013	The League	Rabbi Kirschenblatt	Episode: "Baby Geoffrey Jesus"
2014	The Mentalist	Richard Summers	Episode: "Silver Wings of Time"
2014	Ray Donovan	Judge Irving Saltzman	Episode: "Irish Spring"
2015	You'll Be Fine	Steve	Episode: "Sally's Family"
2015	The Game	Herbie Lesser	Episode: "The Crying Game"
2016	NCIS	Leonard Weiss	Episode: "Shell Game"
2016	Shady Neighbors	Dr. Zondervan	Television film
2017	Your Pretty Face Is Going to Hell	Dr. Paul NickGibbion	Episode: "Hammerman"
2017	Stuck in the Middle	Larry	Episode: "Stuck in a Good Deed"
2020	Grace and Frankie	Sam	Episode: "The Trophy Wife"
2020	Smartphone Theatre	Marcus Carnoff	Episode: "Rare Indulgence"
2020	Trailerville USA	Gus	Episode dated 6 November 2020
2023	The Chosen	Caiaphas	Seasons 4 and 5
