= Radioactive Dreams =

1984 film by Albert Pyun

- Theatrical release poster
- Directed by: Albert Pyun
- Written by: Albert Pyun
- Produced by: Moctesuma Esparza
- Starring: John Stockwell; Michael Dudikoff; George Kennedy; Don Murray; Michele Little; Norbert Weisser; Lisa Blount
- Cinematography: Charles Minsky
- Edited by: Dennis M. O'Connor
- Music by: Peter Manning Robinson
- Distributed by: De Laurentiis Entertainment Group (DEG) (US); Manson International (Non-US)
- Release dates: October 1984 (MIFED (Mercato internazionale del film e del documentario)); July 1985 (Mystfest); September 19, 1986 (United States)
- Running time: 98 minutes
- Country: United States
- Language: English
- Budget: $3 million
- Box office: $7 million

Radioactive Dreams is a 1984 post-apocalyptic science fiction-comedy film written and directed by Albert Pyun and starring George Kennedy, Michael Dudikoff, Don Murray, and Lisa Blount. The names of the two main characters are homages to noir detective fiction icons Philip Marlowe, Raymond Chandler and Mike Hammer. The film has achieved cult status and has been screened in several cult revival programs around the world.

The film begins with two boys growing up in a fallout shelter, in an attempt to escape a nuclear war. They rejoin the world in 2010, and soon acquire the activation keys of the world's last nuclear missile. They get involved in gang warfare in their new environment.

== Plot ==
A nuclear war breaks out, expending the world's entire nuclear arsenal, except for one missile. Two children, Philip Chandler (John Stockwell) and Marlowe Hammer (Michael Dudikoff), are left in a fallout shelter cut into the side of a wooded mountain. The pair grow up in the shelter, with 1950s detective fiction and swing music as the guiding force in their learning. On April 1, 2001 (as noted by the film's title card), Marlowe succeeds in digging out the cave entrance. The pair give each other haircuts, dress in suits, and go to rejoin the world.

Philip narrates their adventure on their first day out:

My name's Philip, and this is going to be a yarn about me and my pal, Marlowe. About the day we got out of this shelter and went off into the post-nuclear world. Now, as excited as we were about leaving the shelter, it was still a joint that held fond memories. I mean, it was the only world we'd ever known. Where I practiced my magic, Marlowe, his dancing; where we both dreamed of becoming private eyes, just like the ones we'd read about.

Marlowe hopes to find their fathers, but Philip is disgruntled that they never returned, and presumes that they are dead. The mountain is now devoid of trees. The first people they find are a trio of radiation-burned mutants chasing a beautiful woman, Miles Archer (Lisa Blount). They rescue Miles, who kisses Marlowe as a distraction and steals his gun. This backfires, as she drops the activation keys to the last nuclear missile. Miles leaves, and the pair are immediately attacked by a biker gang of bald women in red wigs. Afterwards the boys discover the activation keys, which bears their fathers' names. This excites Marlowe, but disturbs Philip.

They rescue another young woman, Rusty Mars (Michele Little), from a group of armed children Philip nicknames "disco mutants." She takes a liking to Philip, and leads the two of them to Edge City which is plagued by gang warfare. Rusty takes them to a dance club, where they are captured by cannibals. They want the nuclear keys, and to eat the young men, a rarity of uncontaminated meat. Although Rusty helps them escape and apologises, Philip doesn't trust her. Just after they part ways the pair meets up with a friend of Miles who also wants the keys. After he is dispatched Miles shows up and takes them to her hideout. There she tells them about the purpose of the keys. Miles then threatens to kill them, but they escape.

Rusty has followed them to the hideout, but is attacked by the child gangsters. The pair chase them away, but Philip still doesn't trust her. He wants to shoot her, but is out of bullets. After Rusty apologises again for lying to him and originally handing him over to the cannibals he says, "That was a million years ago, and I got a short memory. In fact, I don't even remember who you are."

The pair resolves to rid the city of the gangs and keep the keys. They go to an abandoned warehouse, using themselves as bait, in the hopes that the gangs will kill each other before killing them. For the most part, the plan works. However, the bosses of the child-gangsters are in fact Philip and Marlowe's fathers. Before he dies, Philip's father tells him that the past does not matter. In the end, the only gangster left standing is Miles, who has the keys. She shoots at them, and misses, but startles Marlowe into shooting and killing her.

The film ends with Philip letting go of the angst which he had nursed for 15 years. He adopts Marlowe's "silver-lining look on life." The two demonstrate Marlowe's tap-inspired "post-nuke shuffle" to the crowds of the city. In the closing narration, Philip explains that they plan to set up shop as detectives, but that first he will find Rusty and see if he can repair his relationship with her. Of the keys, he says that he and Marlowe hid them in a secret location, because "you never know, in a tight jam a nuclear missile just might come in handy."

== Cast ==
- John Stockwell as Phillip Chandler
- Michael Dudikoff as Marlowe Hammer
- Michele Little as Rusty Mars
- Lisa Blount as Miles Archer
- Don Murray as Dash Hammer
- George Kennedy as "Spade" Chandler
- Norbert Weisser as Sternwood
- Christian Andrews as "Brick" Bardo
- Paul Keller Galan as Chester (credited as P.K. Galán)
- Demian Slade as Harold
- Hilary Shepard as Biker Leader (credited as Hilary Shapiro)
- Sue Saad as Punk District Singer
- Kimberly McKillip as Sadie, Hippie Chick
- Gulcin Gilbert as Greaser Chick (credited as Gulshin Gilbert)
- Mark Brown as Greaser
- Russell Price as Greaser

== Soundtrack ==
Most of the songs featured in the film are pop rock in the new wave vein. The exceptions are Zim Bim Zowie, a swing number, and also a tune in the American Songbook style, Daddy's Gonna Boogie Tonight, played on a phonograph during the scene when Philip and Marlowe prepare to leave the fallout shelter. The latter and another track called All Talk were left out of the Australian and German soundtrack releases.

=== Songs ===
1. Nightmare - Jill Jaxx - 5:10
2. Radioactive Dreams - Sue Saad - 5:18
3. She'll Burn You - Maureen Steele - 4:13
4. Young Thing - Cherri Delight - 4:09
5. Tickin' Of The Clock - The Monte Carlos - 2:07
6. Psychedelic Man - Shari Saba - 2:41
7. Eat You Alive - Lisa Lee - 2:40
8. Guilty Pleasures - Sue Saad - 3:44 (Performed by Saad on-screen)
9. Turn Away - Mary Ellen Quinn - 2:13
10. She's A Fire - Sue Saad - 2:07
11. When Lightning Strikes - Sue Saad - 6:51
12. Zim Bim Zowie - Darryl Phinessee - 2:20 (Danced-To by Marlowe and Philip as the "Post-Nuke Shuffle" in the closing scene)

However, the soundtrack was also released in Spain containing all of the songs featured in the film:

The title track was also a bonus track on a digital reissue of Sue Saad's debut album on July 2, 2013.

== Release ==
The film was given a limited release theatrically in the United States by De Laurentiis Entertainment Group on September 19, 1986, grossing $220,038 at the box office.

It was released on VHS and laserdisc by Vestron Video. As of 2025, the film has still not officially been released on DVD in the US. However, there is a rare German Region 2 Special Edition DVD. This edition also includes the soundtrack CD and is limited to 1,000 copies. The soundtrack on this version has been altered due to music rights issues; two songs were removed. Also, an alternate cut has been released on Japanese laserdisc featuring some material not seen in the US cut while missing other material present in the US cut.

== Awards ==
The film was awarded the Golden Raven at the 5th Brussels International Fantastic Film Festival, and nominated for best film at the Italian film and literature festival MystFest.

== See also ==
- Wasteland (video game), a post-apocalyptic open world role-playing video game series that was heavily inspired by Radioactive Dreams.
- Fallout (series), a video game initially conceived as a "spiritual successor" to Wasteland that eventually turned into its own standalone series (the first game in the Fallout series was made after the initial plans for the sequels Wasteland 2 and Wasteland 3 were compromised due to Electronic Arts' Fountain of Dreams) and borrows even more ideas and design cues from Radioactive Dreams than even Wasteland itself did in the beginning.
