= Land of Doom =

- Directed by: Peter Maris
- Written by: Peter Kotis; Craig Rand
- Starring: Deborah Rennard; Garrick Dowhen; Daniel Radell; Frank Garret
- Release date: 1986
- Running time: 87 minutes
- Country: United States
- Language: English

Land of Doom is an American film set in the 21st Century after what was known as the "Final War" leaves the world in a post-apocalyptic wasteland filled with disease and pollution, unfit for human life. Food is scarce, always taken by raiders led by a mad-man obsessed with murdering the last of the good human beings. Meanwhile, one by one survivors are dying of "the Plague", another concerning problem. Harmony (Deborah Rennard), a sexy, acrobatic, elusive rogue warrior wielding a crossbow, decides to stand up for the tormented and molested villagers and take on the murderous raiders. She meets a wounded survivor by the name of Anderson (Garrick Dowhen), whom she befriends, in order to find the leader of the raiders, Slater (Daniel Radell), and redeem the lives of the people he has done misfortune to.

== Plot ==
Harmony runs away to hide in a cave while her village is attacked by the raiders. Inside, she finds a wounded survivor named Anderson, whom she obviously despises. Eventually, she agrees to travel with Anderson in search of food and shelter. On the road, they are captured by a bounty hunter named Demister, sent out by raider commander Slater. He ties Anderson to a tree and attacks Harmony after she tries to escape.

Hysterical, Harmony kills Demister with a rock and threatens to leave Anderson to die. He convinces her to let him go so he can get them both to a rumored safe haven, though he doesn't know where it is. They take Demister's motorcycle and ride until it's out of fuel. They walk until they come to a fortified ruins where a group of insane, diseased cannibals offer them something called "deer meat". Harmony asks to use the outhouse, where she finds a pile of bodies and is almost attacked by one of the cannibals. When she gets back to Anderson she warns him about the meat, throws her food bowl at the cannibal and ties him up.

On the road again, Harmony senses two cannibals are following them, so they hide in the bushes. She sneaks away and is discovered by one of the cannibals, who she then scuffles with. Harmony sneaks up behind Anderson and scares him to be funny. He becomes enraged and they argue. They continue their journey and are ambushed by a mob wearing tattered clothing concealing their faces. It is revealed that they have the plague and after they fight it over, Anderson and Harmony argue again. They decide to camp and find high ground to stay the night.

In the morning, a loud bang followed by a rumbling surprises the two awake. From the edge of a cliff they observe raiders attacking a nearby village. Anderson recognizes Purvis (Frank Garret), one of Slater's maniacs, standing on a hilltop with some others. The villagers try to repel the raiders in a gunfight. Many die in the battle, until the raiders break through the fence, swarming into the village through the hole. Anderson and Harmony try to sneak into the area during the battle to steal a motorcycle. They attack an injured biker and steal his motorcycle. While they are escaping on the bike, Purvis recognizes Anderson through his spyglass and sends troops after them.

The raiders almost catch up with the fugitives, so Anderson attempts to ride down into a steep valley, but they follow. Anderson then ambushes the raiders, shooting one. The fugitives try to escape back uphill until Harmony jumps off of the bike, causing the raiders to split up while chasing them.

Anderson stops to check his fuel and is captured by Purvis. He tries to joke with Purvis, stalling until Harmony can rescue him. She sneaks behind Purvis and holds him up with a branch and a small pistol. The two leave him frozen in place, afraid to move because of a rattlesnake sliding over his boot. Back on the road, they find a man stuck on a boulder while a pack of rabid dogs circle below. Anderson scares the dogs off and the traveler climbs down. Orland and his puppy accompany Anderson and Harmony for a while. After saying goodbye to the man and his puppy, they ride away, only to be captured by the raiders. Orland witnesses their capture and follows the truck carrying them.

Anderson and Harmony are brought before Lead Raider Slater, in a cave used as the raider's headquarters. Slater thinks he can have Harmony, so he tries to win her over with the promise of riches and sex, but she just spits in his face. She gets free and grabs a lead pipe and attacks the raiders as Anderson, still held by burly raiders, and concubines look on. She tries to defend herself, but they overpower her, ripping some of her clothes off. Purvis returns and threatens Anderson because of the snake. Slater pushes Purvis down and orders him to take the captives to the cells.

Meanwhile, Orland is still following the truck tracks. He leaves behind his bike and puppy as he races to catch up with the raiders. From the top of a cliff he sees the raiders' outpost. He returns to his bike, but can't find his puppy. While searching for her, he falls into a hole, landing in a small tomb. He finds his puppy there, but is also attacked by a group of strange-speaking dwarves.

Anderson and Harmony are chained to a rock wall, hanging over a fire. Purvis comes in to announce when Anderson is to be executed. They unchain both prisoners and bring them to Slater. Harmony is then chained to a beam set across a roasting fire. Suddenly, out of nowhere, Orland jumps into the cave and begins firing a flamethrower. In the ensuing chaos, Anderson attacks Slater, who runs away and hides behind a tapestry. Anderson grabs a gun and helps Orland kills the rest of the raiders. The three then escape through a secret door while Purvis and others follow them through the fire. They arrive at the dwarves' armory and Orland explains what is going on.

The cloaked dwarves lead the three to a secret hatch above the raider camp, where they begin to shoot at the men, who return fire. The three escape are about to escape when, Orland remembers seeing an oil tanker earlier and lights it on fire. They escape during the confusion caused by the oil explosion. They destroy all the raiders' fuel reserves and escape on foot. Purvis and his raiders emerge from the smokey wreckage and he leads them in a search for the trio. Orland finds an abandoned truck and hotwires it. Raider bikers chase after the truck, shooting at it. They come to a bridge and find the midgets helping them keep the raiders at bay. The three make it safely across the bridge just before the truck explodes, destroying the bridge and blocking the raiders from following.

Orland decides to stay with his new dwarf friends and his puppy. He sees Slater chasing after the other two and starts running and yelling for Anderson and Harmony. They both look back to see what's wrong and discover Slater is still chasing them. Anderson explains,"Here we go again!" as Orland catches up to them and they all start running up the hill as the credits roll.

== Production ==
The film was produced by Matterhorn Group, a division of Maris Entertainment Corporation.

== Release ==
On July 13, 1986, Land of Doom was described as "soon-to-be-released" in The Indianapolis Star.
