= Sue Saad and the Next =

American new wave band

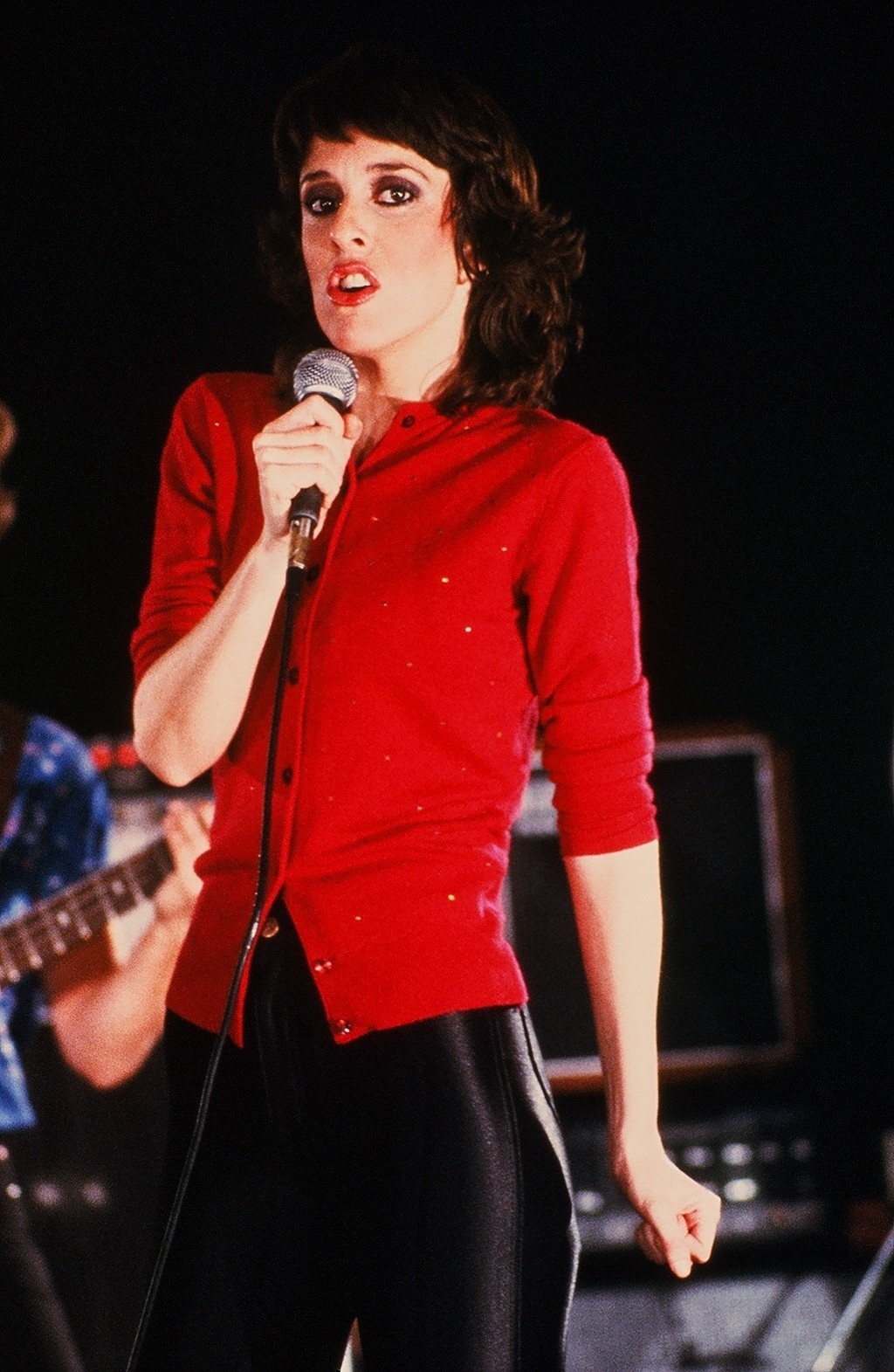
- Sue Saad

Background information
- Origin: Los Angeles, California, United States
- Genres: Pop, rock, new wave, progressive rock, punk rock
- Years active: 1978—1986
- Labels: Planet; Warner Bros. Records
- Spinoff of: Calliope
- Members: Sue Saad; James Lance; Tony Riparetti; Billy Anstatt; Bobby Manzer

Sue Saad and the Next was an American new wave band from Los Angeles, California. Their self-titled first album reached No. 131 in the US Billboard 200 in 1980. Sue Saad and the Next also provided part of the soundtracks for several films during the 1980s such as Roadie (1980), Looker (1981) and Radioactive Dreams (1985). Saad performed in Radioactive Dreams and voiced the main theme for Looker.

== Band members ==
- Sue Saad (1978–1986): Vocalist and songwriter
- James Lance (1978–1986): Drummer, vocalist and co-songwriter. He worked with Richard Perry to produce the band's first album.
- Tony Riparetti (1978–1986): Guitarist, vocalist and co-songwriter. After leaving the band, he started his own studio and frequently worked with director Albert Pyun.
- Billy Anstatt (1978–1981): Backup guitarist
- Bobby Manzer (1978–1981): Bass player

== History ==
Sue Marie Saad, James Lance and Anthony "Tony" Lloyd Riparetti met in junior high school while growing up in Santa Barbara, California. Given their mutual interest in music, they began collaborating and eventually formed The Calliope. They achieved some success and released several singles. One of these, "We've Made It", dealt with the generation gap and so angered a local disc jockey that he destroyed the record while still on air and voiced a tirade against the band.

The three formed a new band around 1978, Sue Saad and the Next, whereupon they moved to San Francisco and then Los Angeles hoping to find work as sidemen. It was during this time that they began writing songs and recording them on their Rodney Sound four-track tape recorder. They were later joined by guitarist Billy Anstatt and bass player Bobby Manzer, studio musicians who had played together in the rock musical Zen Boogie, wanting to perform in a regular band. The band played in clubs and similar venues throughout Los Angeles and were eventually signed by Warner Bros. Records to develop as writers. Then-chairman Ed Silvers brought the band to record producer Richard Perry who immediately signed them to a contract with his company Planet Records in late 1979. They, along with Marc Safan and the Cretones, were the first new wave groups signed to the label.

The band's debut album was co-produced by James Lance and Richard Perry, the first time Perry had ever shared a production credit, with all the songs being written by Lance, Riparetti and Saad. The album, self-titled Sue Saad and the Next, took less than twenty days to finish at a cost of $50,000. This was well below the industry standard, generally between $125,000–150,000 financing, and at least 3 to 6 months production time. It was released in 1980 and reached No. 131 on the US Billboard 200. Perry later said the album's songs "evoke[d] youthful passion seasoned with wry adult knowledge, as well as a toughminded picture of daily American life and the ways it can be lit up by moments of rock and roll celebration." It was the fourth album to come out from Richard Perry's label and received some positive reviews, earning comparisons to Pat Benatar and Blondie, and made its way overseas months later.

That same year, their music was featured in the 1980 comedy film Roadie along with Eddie Rabbitt, Jerry Lee Lewis, Roy Orbison and Emmylou Harris, The Joe Ely Band, Teddy Pendergrass, Jay Ferguson and Pat Benatar. The film's director Alan Rudolph liked the band so much that one scene was written in specifically for one of their songs, "Double Yellow Line", which took place on a highway.

The band continued performing throughout the United States and toured Europe with UFO and the Boomtown Rats. They also appeared in concerts run by Texas promoter Jack Orbin in late 1981. During the next few years, Sue Saad and the Next performed the main themes for the science fiction films Looker (1981) and Radioactive Dreams (1985). "Radioactive Dreams" and three other songs, "Guilty Pleasure", "She's A Fire" and "When Lightning Strikes", were among those released on the official Radioactive Dreams soundtrack. It was also in Radioactive Dreams that Sue Saad had a small role as a punk rocker who performed a musical number, "Guilty Pleasure", and is regarded by many fans of the film as one of its most memorable moments.

It was while working on "Radioactive Dreams" that director Albert Pyun made an offer to James Lance and Tony Riparetti to score music for film and together composed the music for Say Yes (1986), Commando Squad (1987), Alien from L.A. (1988) and Brainsmasher... A Love Story (1993). Though Lance eventually left the partnership, Riparetti remained with Pyun and continued to compose scores for his films including Omega Doom (1997), Mean Guns (1997), Postmortem (1998), Invasion (2005) and Left for Dead (2007). He also worked with Beastie Boys for a time. Riparetti's success led to his starting his own company, Sound Logic, which composes film scores and sound editing for low-budget films from his North Calle César Chávez studio in Santa Barbara. In April 2008, Riparetti and his company were featured in the Santa Barbara Independent.

The band's second album Long Way Home, recorded in the 1980s under the band's own initiative and funding, was released digitally in January 2016.

== Discography ==
=== Albums ===
==== Studio albums ====
Year	Album details	Peak chart positions									Certifications (sales threshold)
Year	Album details	UK	US	CAN	JPN	GER	AUS	SWE	NZ	SWI	Certifications (sales threshold)
1980	Sue Saad and the Next: Released: 1980; Label: Planet Records	—	131	—	—	—	—	—	—	—	

==== Compilation albums ====
Year	Album details	Peak chart positions				Certifications (sales threshold)
Year	Album details	UK	US	JPN	GER	Certifications (sales threshold)
1985	Radioactive Dreams Soundtrack: Released: 1985; Label: Warner Brothers	—	—	—	—	

=== Singles ===
Year	Single	Peak chart positions									Album
Year	Single	UK	US	US Dance	CAN	JPN	GER	AUS	ITA	NL	Album
1980	"Your Lips-Hands-Kiss-Love"	—	—	—	—	—	—	—	—	—	Sue Saad and the Next
1980	"Gimme Love Gimme Pain"	—	—	—	—	—	—	—	—	43	Sue Saad and the Next
1980	"Young Girl"	—	—	—	—	—	—	—	—	18	Sue Saad and the Next
1980	"Prisoner"	—	—	—	—	—	—	—	—	—	Sue Saad and the Next
1980	"Won't Give it Up"	—	107	—	—	—	—	—	—	—	Sue Saad and the Next
1981	"Looker" *	—	104	—	—	—	—	—	—	—	Non-album song

- *Note: the 45-Rpm single version of "Looker" is about 1 minute longer than the version used for the movie and is mixed & played differently.

== Covers ==
- "Prisoner" was covered by Sheena Easton on her 1981 album Take My Time, then again by Uriah Heep on their 1982 Abominog. Cherie Currie and Marie Currie covered "Prisoner" on the 1997 re-release of Messin' with the Boys.
- "Looker" was covered by Kim Carnes on her 1982 album Voyeur.
