= Douglas Rowe =

American actor (1938–2023)

- Born: 1938; Paterson, New Jersey, U.S.
- Died: May 13, 2023 (aged 85); Medford, Oregon, U.S.
- Occupations: Actor, director
- Years active: 1963–2019

Douglas Rowe (1938 – May 13, 2023) was an American actor.

== Early life and career ==
Rowe was born in Paterson, New Jersey in 1938. He was mostly a character and supporting actor. Rowe appeared in films such as The Incident (1990) and Appointment with Fear (1985); his character as the off-beat, seedy looking detective in Appointment with Fear was described as a "maniac detective inspired by Dirty Harry." On television he appeared in the Star Trek: The Next Generation, episode "The Outrageous Okona." In the 1990s he appeared as a Proprietor in Murder She Wrote, portrayed Dr. Arndt in ER and Ricky in Northern Exposure and pilot Aylesworth in M*A*S*H. He played Governor Brubaker's attendant in "The Wild Wild West" S3 E12 "The Night of the Legion of Death" which aired 11/22/1967.

=== Theater ===
Rowe was managing director of the Laguna Playhouse from 1964 to 1966, and served as artistic director from 1976 to 1991. Rowe is also a prolific stage actor, starring in productions of Death of a Salesman, Caesar and Cleopatra, Our Town and As You Like It.

=== Death ===
Rowe died in Medford, Oregon on May 13, 2023, at the age of 85.
