= Scott Valentine (actor) =

American actor (born 1958)

- Born: Scott Eugene Valentine; June 3, 1958 (age 68); Saratoga Springs, New York, U.S.
- Occupation: Actor
- Years active: 1982 - 2007
- Spouses: Kym Valentine (m. 1985; div. 2012) Jennifer Wood (née Malchow) (m. 2021)
- Children: 4

Scott Eugene Valentine (born June 3, 1958) is an American former actor, best known for his role as Nick Moore on the series Family Ties.

== Life and career ==
Valentine was born in Saratoga Springs, New York, the son of Beverly Ann (née Hanna) and Edward Eugene Valentine. He began to pursue acting one year into his college education, attending the American Academy of Dramatic Arts in New York City. He completed the three-year program in one and a half years. He got as far as a screen test for the film The Lords of Discipline when he was hit, run over, and dragged by a truck on September 17, 1981 and his career was halted for three years as he recovered. He moved to Los Angeles and landed a recurring role on the TV series Family Ties as Nick Moore for seasons 4 through 7.

During an interview for Montreal radio station CJAD, Valentine thought the role was not challenging enough for the money he was receiving, saying: "I'm so glad I went to the American Academy of Dramatic Arts and to all the other fine acting institutions so I could grunt on primetime television. The primal dig, the date from hell. It was a lot of fun, but literally there were times where I only had to utter two guttural utterances in a show and they paid me a bundle of cash for it. I felt bad at times."

Valentine's success as Nick Moore on Family Ties led to three separate spin-offs. The first, Taking It Home, starred Valentine and Herschel Bernardi. Filming was canceled following Bernardi's death in 1986. The second spin-off placed Valentine's character in a Friends-like environment in New York City, and the character was employed at a juvenile detention center. The scripts written were considered not good enough to film a pilot by NBC. The third was a pilot episode for a spin-off titled The Art of Being Nick; the episode aired once and co-starred Julia Louis-Dreyfus. "It came in number two and they still didn't pick it up," recalled Valentine. The episode aired on August 27, 1987, just prior to the new television season beginning in September.

He has appeared since then as a guest actor in several hit television series such as CSI: NY, NewsRadio, and JAG; his first major motion picture, My Demon Lover; and numerous TV and direct-to-video films. He also voiced The Phantom in Phantom 2040 and portrayed Metallo in Lois & Clark: The New Adventures of Superman.

== Personal life ==
On September 29, 1985, in Los Angeles, Valentine married actress Kym Denyse (Fisher) Stephenson. Valentine and Stephenson divorced February 14, 2012. Valentine has four sons from the marriage; Trevin John (1986), Shayler Stephenson (1988), Jesstin Jay-Owen (1992) and Caden Edward (1998).

On November 7, 2021, Valentine married Jennifer (Malchow) Wood, another Saratoga Springs native, in their hometown of Saratoga Springs.

Valentine is a partner in Excelsior Capital Partners, a boutique investment firm that focuses on the renewable and sustainable energy sector.

== Filmography ==
=== Films ===
Year	Title	Role	Notes
1982	Waitress!	Swingdog Dope Busboy	
1986	Deadtime Stories	Peter	
1986	True Stories	Member of Air Band	
1987	My Demon Lover	Kaz	
1988	Going to the Chapel	Jeff	
1990	Without Her Consent	Jason Barnes	
1990	After the Shock	Gerry Shannon	
1991	Killer Instinct	Tim Casey	
1994	The Unborn 2	John Edson	
1995	Object of Obsession	Blaze	
1996	Carnosaur 3: Primal Species	Colonel Rance Higgins	
2001	Black Scorpion Returns	Detective Steve Rafferty	
2002	Sting of the Black Scorpion	Detective Steve Rafferty	
2003	Black Ball	Kevin	
2005	Frostbite	Jack Schitt	
2007	Harpies	Vorian	

=== Television ===
Year	Title	Role	Notes
1985	Knight Rider	Colton	Episode: "The Wrong Crowd"
1985–1989	Family Ties	Nick Moore	44 episodes
1986	Matlock	Danny Blaster	Episode: "The Angel"
1987	The Art of Being Nick	Nick Moore	
1990	Write to Kill	Clark Sanford	
1990	Dangerous Pursuit		
1990	Midnight Caller	Frankie Killian	Episode: "Three for the Money"
1990	Without Her Consent	Jason Barnes	
1991	The Hitchhiker	Joe	Episode: "Living a Lie"
1992	Perry Mason: The Case of the Fatal Framing	Damien Blakely	
1992	The Secret Passion of Robert Clayton	Robert Clayton Jr.	
1992	Lady Boss	Ron	
1992–1994	Batman: The Animated Series	The Chemist, Raymond Bell	Voice, 2 episodes
1993	To Sleep with a Vampire	Jacob	
1994	Till the End of the Night	John Davenport	
1994	Whit & Charm		
1994	Double Obsession	Steve Burke	
1994	Sirens	Jake Bryer	Episode: "Family Secrets"
1993–1995	Murder, She Wrote	Darman H. Keene	2 episodes
1995	Lois & Clark: The New Adventures of Superman	Johnny Corben / Metallo	Episode: "Metallo"
1995	Out of Annie's Past	Michael Carver	
1995	Yakuza Connection	Mark Rictus	
1995	Silk Stalkings	Elliot Hammond	Episode: "Pulp Addiction"
1995	Iron Man	Dark Aegis	Voice, episode: "Distant Boundaries"
1996	Phantom 2040	Kit Walker, Jr. / 24th Phantom	Voice, main role (35 episodes)
1996	Superman: The Animated Series	Sam Coralli	Voice, episode: "A Little Piece of Home"
1996	Renegade	Bruce Cassidy	Episode: "Five Minutes to Midnight"
1996	Walker, Texas Ranger	Ben Bodine	Episode: "The Brotherhood"
1997	Black Scorpion II: Aftershock	Dick	
1997	NewsRadio	Producer	Episode: "Planbee"
1997	Mars	Pete, The Hermit	
1997	Promised Land	Coach Belmont	Episode: "Mr. Muscles"
1997	Pinky and the Brain	Spike	Voice, episode: "The Real Life"
1998	The Waterfront	Vinnie Etchabara	
1998	Paranoia	Warren	
1998	Mike Hammer, Private Eye	Maxwell Davidoff	Episode: "The Long Road to Nowhere"
1998	Animaniacs	Jacobi Myers	Voice, episode: "The Christmas Tree"
1999	Fallout	Captain George Tanner, Gateway Station Commander	
1999	Martial Law	Brad Cavanaugh	Episode: "Breakout"
1999	Batman Beyond	Coe	Voice, episode: "Joyride"
2000	JAG	Baxter Stark	Episode: "People v. Gunny"
2001	Black Scorpion	Detective Steve Rafferty	22 episodes
2004	CSI: NY	Dr. Steven Rydell	Episode: "Night, Mother"
