= Without Her Consent =

1990 television drama film by Sandor Stern

- Genre: Drama; Crime
- Written by: Ann M. Beckett
- Directed by: Sandor Stern
- Starring: Melissa Gilbert
- Music by: Mike Post
- Country of origin: United States
- Original language: English

Production
- Executive producers: Raymond Katz; Carla Singer
- Producer: Frank Brill
- Cinematography: Stanley E. Gilbert
- Editor: Caroline Biggerstaff
- Running time: 97 minutes
- Production companies: Raymond Katz Production; Carla Singer Productions; Half-Pint Productions

Original release
- Network: NBC
- Release: January 14, 1990

Without Her Consent is a 1990 American made-for-television drama film directed by Sandor Stern. Originally airing on NBC on Sunday, January 14th, 1990, the film is based on a true story and stars Melissa Gilbert as a woman who seeks justice after being raped by an acquaintance.

== Plot ==
When she moves from Idaho to Los Angeles because of a new job offer, Emily Briggs quickly meets Jason Barnes, a friendly neighbor who works as a set decorator for movies. He invites her to his home in Santa Monica to pick up an old table which she can use at her new place, though uses the meeting to rape her. Emily unsuccessfully struggles to get away, and fears for her life throughout the rape. Her cousin Marty insists for her to report the case, but the District Attorney denies the case because she voluntarily went to his house, and there were no witnesses present. The fact that he was arrested five times before with the same allegations does not influence the case. Emily tries to move on with her life, but finds out that she is not able to share intimacy with her boyfriend Trey Cousins.

Sometime later, Emily receives a visit from a woman named Marcia Daily, who tells her that she was raped by Jason as well, and that all of the women were stalked by him afterwards as a way of power control. Marcia tells her that an attorney named Gloria Allred can make a case of the rape if they combine powers, but Emily is reluctant to go to court. Emily later admits to being raped to Trey, when he overhears her conversation with Marcia. Trey is upset that she went to a stranger's house and estranges from her by claiming that she was asking for the rape. He tries to avoid doing harm to Jason out of anger, but eventually runs him over with his car. Aware that her fiancé is facing a prison sentence, Emily turns to Gloria for help. Gloria agrees to take on his case, and takes Emily's rape story to the media in hopes of influencing the jury. Trey is reluctant to allow Emily's rape to become a national sensation, but the story is printed anyway on Emily's insistence.

In court, Trey is sentenced to 36 months of probation, as well as getting a restraining order against Jason's residence and having to pay for his medical expenses. He is too overwhelmed with the case and its media attention, and Emily leaves him when he admits that he is too distressed with his own problems to support her with recovering from the rape. Meanwhile, a young woman named Claire Sugarman steps forward to being raped by Jason as well, which enables Gloria to make a case. Emily is reluctant to go court yet again, until she grows determined to prove to everyone that she was not lying about being raped. Trey visits her in hopes of a reconciliation, but Emily tells him that she honestly does not think that he believes that she was raped.

During the trial against Jason, Emily is being battered while on the stand on being promiscuous. Their attorney hopes to break Jason by confronting him of having lied to the police about knowing Emily, though Jason lies himself out of the situation, endangering the case for Emily. Trey, convinced of regaining Emily's affection, sets out for himself to prove that Jason is guilty, and meets with Jason's neighbor Pete Raymond, who can serve as a witness. Emily is touched by Trey's actions, especially due to the fact that he ignored his restraining order in her sake. After Pete tells in court that Emily left his place shocked and battered, in torn clothes, Jason breaks and admits to the crime. He is sentenced to 10 years in prison, and Emily now reconciled with Trey, receives $5 million in damages.

== Cast ==
- Melissa Gilbert as Emily Briggs
- Scott Valentine as Jason Barnes
- Barry Tubb as Trey Cousins
- Bebe Neuwirth as Gloria Allred
- Crystal Bernard as Marty
- Brooke Bundy as Mom
- Richard Fancy as Strathom
- Peter Hobbs as Pete Raymond
- Madison Mason as Detective Striker
- Julie McCullough as Claire Sugarman
- Robin Riker as Marcia Daily
- Len Birman as Judge Wasserman
