= Paul Haggis =

Canadian filmmaker (born 1953)

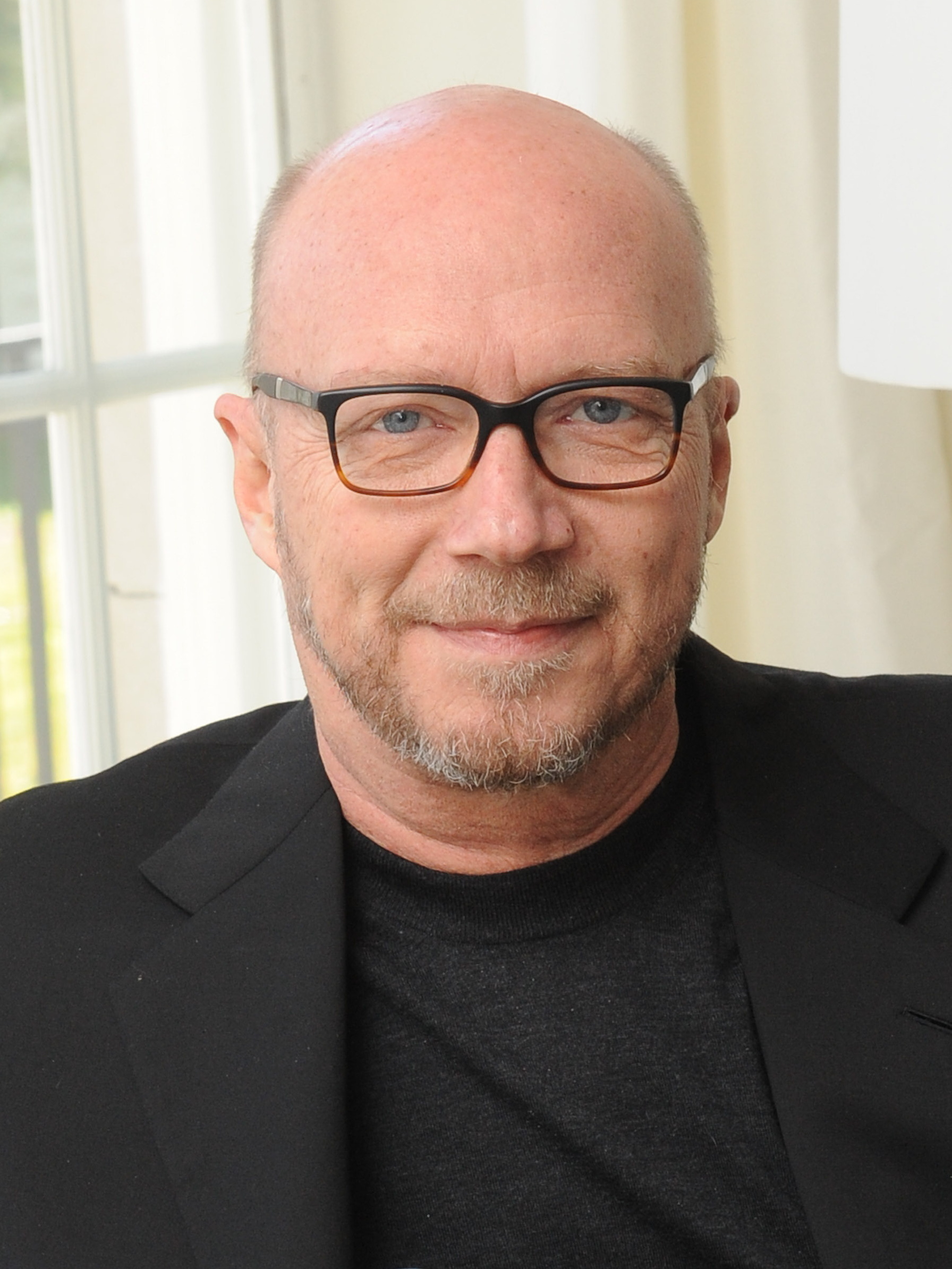
- Haggis in 2013
- Born: Paul Edward Haggis; March 10, 1953 (age 73); London, Ontario, Canada
- Occupations: Screenwriter; producer; director
- Years active: 1975–present
- Spouses: Diane Christine Gettas (m. 1977; div. 1994) Deborah Rennard (m. 1997; div. 2016)
- Children: 4

Paul Edward Haggis (born March 10, 1953) is a Canadian screenwriter, film producer, and director of film and television. He is best known as screenwriter and producer for consecutive Best Picture Oscar winners Million Dollar Baby (2004) and Crash (2005), the latter of which he also directed. Haggis also co-wrote the war film Flags of Our Fathers (2006) and the James Bond films Casino Royale (2006) and Quantum of Solace (2008). He is the creator of the television series Due South (1994–1999) and co-creator of Walker, Texas Ranger (1993–2001), among others. Haggis is a two-time Academy Award winner, two-time Emmy Award winner, and seven-time Gemini Award winner. He also assisted in the making of "We Are the World 25 for Haiti".

== Early life ==
Paul Edward Haggis was born in London, Ontario, the son of Mary Yvonne (née Metcalf) and Ted Haggis, a World War II veteran and Olympic sprinter in the 1948 Summer Olympics. He was raised as a Catholic, attending Catholic school and facing confrontations with children from Ontario's Protestant majority. His family had stopped going to Mass after finding their parish priest driving a Cadillac, and he considered himself an atheist by early adulthood. The Gallery Theatre in London was owned by his parents, and Haggis gained experience in the field through work at the theatre.

Haggis attended St. Thomas More Elementary School. He started secondary school at Ridley College in St. Catharines, but began getting into bad behavior by skipping his required Royal Canadian Army Cadets drills, breaking into the prefect's office to erase his demerits, and reading the radical magazine Ramparts. After a year, Haggis's parents transferred him to a more progressive preparatory school in Muskoka Lakes. Haggis was taught by a producer of the CBC Radio One news program As It Happens, who allowed him to sit with him as he edited John Dean's testimony to the Watergate hearings for broadcast.

After being inspired by Alfred Hitchcock and Jean-Luc Godard, Haggis proceeded to study art at H. B. Beal Secondary School. He opened a theater in Toronto to screen films banned by the Ontario Board of Censors such as The Devils and Last Tango in Paris. After viewing Michelangelo Antonioni's 1966 film Blowup in 1974, he traveled to England with the intent of becoming a fashion photographer. Haggis later returned to Canada to pursue studies in cinematography at Fanshawe College. While in London, Ontario, Haggis was converted to Scientology. In 1975, Haggis moved to Los Angeles, California, to begin a career in writing in the entertainment industry.

== Career ==
Haggis began to work as a writer for television programs, including Dingbat and the Creeps, Richie Rich, Scooby-Doo and Scrappy-Doo, The Love Boat, One Day at a Time, Diff'rent Strokes, and The Facts of Life. With The Facts of Life, Haggis also gained his first credit as producer. During the 1980s and 1990s, Haggis wrote for television series including thirtysomething, The Tracey Ullman Show, FM, Due South, L.A. Law, and EZ Streets. He helped to create the television series Walker, Texas Ranger; Family Law; and Due South. Haggis served as executive producer of the series Michael Hayes and Family Law. In 1999, he signed a first look deal with Columbia TriStar Television.

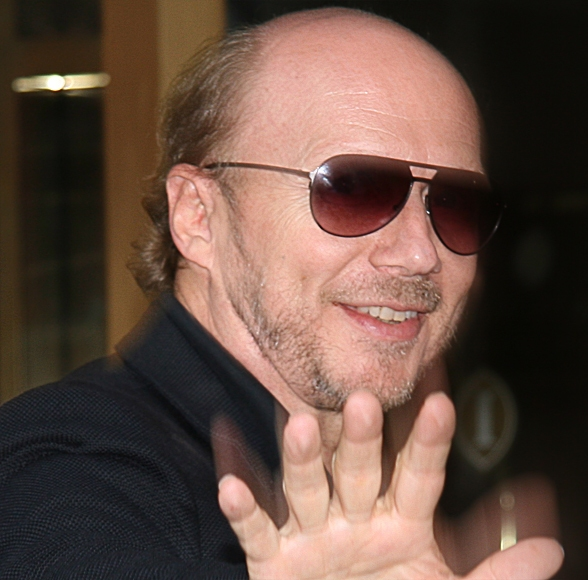
Haggis at the 2007 Toronto International Film Festival

He gained recognition in the film industry for his work on the 2004 film Million Dollar Baby, which Allmovie described as a "serious milestone" for the writer/producer, and as "his first high-profile foray into feature film". Haggis had read two stories written by Jerry Boyd, a boxing trainer who wrote under the name of F.X. Toole. Haggis later acquired the rights to the stories, and developed them into the screenplay for Million Dollar Baby. Clint Eastwood directed the film and portrayed the lead character. Million Dollar Baby received four Academy Awards including the Academy Award for Best Picture.

After Million Dollar Baby, Haggis worked on the 2004 film Crash. Haggis came up with the story for the film on his own, and then wrote and directed the film, which allowed him greater control over his work. Crash was his first experience as director of a major feature film. Highly positive upon release, critical reception of Crash has since polarized, although Roger Ebert called it the best film of 2005.

Crash received Academy Award nominations for Best Picture and Best Director, in addition to four other Academy Award nominations. Haggis received two Academy Awards for the film: Best Picture (as its producer), and Best Writing for his work on the screenplay. With Million Dollar Baby and then Crash, Haggis became the first individual to have written Best Picture Oscar winners in two consecutive years.

Haggis said that he wrote Crash to "bust liberals", arguing that his fellow liberals were not honest with themselves about the nature of race and racism because they believed that most racial problems in American society had already been resolved.

He has been a member of the Academy of Motion Picture Arts and Sciences in the Writers' Branch since 2005. This allows him to vote on the Academy Awards.

In 2008, Haggis founded production company Hwy61 Films with producer Michael Nozik, and signed a deal to produce films for United Artists. The company is named after the title track of Bob Dylan's 1965 album Highway 61 Revisited.

== Personal life ==
Haggis lives in Santa Monica, California. He has three daughters from his first marriage to Diana Gettas and one son from his second marriage to Deborah Rennard. His younger sister, Jo Francis, is a film editor; they have worked together on several projects.

In 2009, Haggis founded the non-profit organization Artists for Peace and Justice to assist impoverished youth in Haiti. In an interview with Dan Rather in 2016, Haggis mentioned that he is an atheist.

=== Break from Scientology ===
After maintaining active membership in the Church of Scientology for 35 years, Haggis left the organization in October 2009. He was motivated to leave Scientology in reaction to statements made by the San Diego branch of the Church of Scientology in support of Proposition 8, the ballot initiative which banned same-sex marriage in California.

Haggis wrote to Tommy Davis, the Church's spokesman, and requested that he denounce these statements; when Davis remained silent, Haggis responded that "Silence is consent, Tommy. I refuse to consent." Haggis went on to list other grievances against Scientology, including its policy of disconnection, and the smearing of its ex-members through the leaking of their personal details.

The Observer comments that: "The decision of [Jason] Beghe and Haggis to quit Scientology appears to have caused the movement its greatest recent PR difficulties, not least because of its dependence on Hollywood figures as both a source of revenue for its most expensive courses and an advertisement for the religion."

In an interview with Movieline, Haggis was asked about similarities between his film The Next Three Days and his departure from the Scientology organization; Haggis responded, "I think one's life always parallels art and art parallels life." In February 2011, The New Yorker published a 25,000-word story, "The Apostate", by Lawrence Wright, detailing Haggis's allegations about the Church of Scientology. The article ended by quoting Haggis: "My bet is that, within two years, you’re going to read something about me in a scandal that looks like it has nothing to do with the church. ... I was in a cult for thirty-four years. Everyone else could see it. I don't know why I couldn't." Haggis was interviewed as part of a group of ex-Scientologists for the 2015 movie Going Clear: Scientology and the Prison of Belief.

=== Sexual misconduct allegations ===
In 2017, publicist Haleigh Breest filed a lawsuit against Haggis, alleging that he had sexually assaulted her after a film premiere in 2013. Haggis denied all allegations and filed a countersuit, claiming Breest intended to bankrupt him by extracting a $9 million settlement. His suit was dismissed.

In 2021, Haggis asked a judge to expedite his civil trial. He said he "cannot continue to pay his legal bills." Haggis requested the judge set a trial "at the earliest practical date." His lawyer, Seth Zuckerman, wrote in the motion that "the defendant is no longer in a position to finance his defence with this matter lingering in advance of trial." Following the initial accusation, three additional women came forward with various accusations of sexual assault and misconduct.

Fellow former Scientologists Leah Remini and Mike Rinder have defended him, suggesting that the Church of Scientology may be involved, an assertion both the accusers and the Church itself deny.

On June 19, 2022, Haggis was arrested in Ostuni in southern Italy over allegations of sexual assault. Local law enforcement charged him with aggravated sexual violence and aggravated personal injuries. A judge of the local court of Brindisi overturned Haggis' house arrest on July 4. On July 29, a three judge panel of the District Court of Lecce unanimously dismissed the charges against Haggis.

On November 10, 2022, a New York jury found Haggis liable for the rape of Breest in a civil suit and ordered him to pay her at least $7.5 million. On November 14, the jury ordered Haggis to pay an additional $2.5 million in punitive damages. On March 9, 2023, Manhattan Supreme Court Judge Sabrina Kraus ordered Haggis to pay an additional $2.8 million in attorney fees and costs. The total judgement in damages and fees Haggis was ordered to pay is $12.8 million. Haggis told the court that the case effectively bankrupted him and claimed he has no ability to pay the verdict or any additional costs and fees.

== Filmography ==
=== Film ===
Year	Title	Director	Writer	Producer	Notes
1993	Red Hot	Yes	Yes	No	
2004	Million Dollar Baby	No	Yes	Yes	
2004	Crash	Yes	Yes	Yes	
2006	The Last Kiss	No	Yes	No	
2006	Flags of Our Fathers	No	Yes	No	
2006	Casino Royale	No	Yes	No	
2007	In the Valley of Elah	Yes	Yes	Yes	
2008	Quantum of Solace	No	Yes	No	
2009	Terminator Salvation	No	Uncredited	No	Uncredited script revisions
2010	The Next Three Days	Yes	Yes	No	
2013	Third Person	Yes	Yes	No	
2018	5B	Yes	No	Yes	Documentary film; Co-directed with Dan Krauss

Executive producer

- Letters from Iwo Jima (2006) (Also story writer)
- Gold (2016)

Ref.:

=== Television ===
Year	Title	Director	Writer	Executive producer	Creator	Notes
1987	The Return of the Shaggy Dog	No	Yes	No	No	
1987–1988	thirtysomething	No	Yes	No	No	Also supervising producer
1990	City	No	No	Yes	Yes	
1990–1991	You Take the Kids	Yes	Yes	Yes	Yes	
1993–2001	Walker, Texas Ranger	No	No	No	Yes	
1994–1999	Due South	Yes	Yes	Yes	Yes	Also unit director
1996–1997	EZ Streets	Yes	Yes	Yes	Yes	
1997–1998	Michael Hayes	No	Yes	Yes	No	Also developer
1999–2002	Family Law	Yes	Yes	Yes	Yes	
2007	The Black Donnellys	Yes	Yes	Yes	Yes	
2015	Show Me a Hero	Yes	No	Yes	No	Miniseries

Acting credit

Year	Title	Role	Episode
2006	Entourage	Himself	"Crash and Burn"

TV movies

Year	Title	Director	Writer	Executive producer	Notes
1998	Ghost of a Chance	Yes	Yes	Yes	
2008	Speechless	No	Yes	No	Documentary film
2017	Shelter	No	Yes	Yes	

=== Music Video ===
Year	Title	Role
2010	We Are the World 25 for Haiti	Director

=== Video Game ===
Year	Title	Role
2011	Call of Duty: Modern Warfare 3	Co-writer

== Awards and nominations ==
Year	Award	Category	Work	Result
1985	Humanitas Prize	Children's Animation Category	CBS Storybreak: "Zucchini"	Nominated
1988	Primetime Emmy Award	Outstanding Drama Series	thirtysomething	Won
1988	Primetime Emmy Award	Outstanding Writing for a Drama Series	thirtysomething	Won
1988	Humanitas Prize	60 Minute Category	thirtysomething	Won
1989	Writers Guild of America Award	Episodic Drama	thirtysomething	Nominated
1995	Gemini Award	Best Dramatic Series	Due South	Won
1995	Gemini Award	Best TV Movie	Due South: Pilot (#1.0)	Won
1995	Gemini Award	Best Writing in a Dramatic Series	Due South	Won
1995	Gemini Award	Best Writing in a Dramatic Program or Mini-Series	Due South: Pilot (#1.0)	Nominated
1996	Gemini Award	Canada's Choice Award	Due South	Won
1996	Gemini Award	Best Dramatic Series	Due South	Won
1996	Gemini Award	Best Writing in a Dramatic Series	Due South: "Hawk and a Handsaw"	Won
1996	Gemini Award	Best Writing in a Dramatic Series	Due South: "The Gift of the Wheelman"	Won
1997	Viewers for Quality Television Award	Founder's Award	EZ Streets	Won
2001	Writers Guild of America Award	Valentine Davies Award	Contributions to industry	Won
2005	Writers Guild of America Award	Best Adapted Screenplay	Million Dollar Baby	Nominated
2005	American Screenwriters Association	Discover Screenwriting Award	Million Dollar Baby	Won
2005	Academy Awards	Best Adapted Screenplay	Million Dollar Baby	Nominated
2005	Black Movie Award	Outstanding Motion Picture	Crash	Won
2005	Deauville American Film Festival	Grand Special Prize	Crash	Won
2005	European Film Award	Screen International Award	Crash	Nominated
2005	Hollywood Film Festival	Directing work	Breakthrough Directing	Won
2005	Las Vegas Film Critics Society Award	Best Screenplay	Crash	Won
2005	Online Film Critics Society Award	Best Screenplay, Adapted	Million Dollar Baby	Nominated
2005	San Diego Film Festival	Discover Screenwriter Award	Life's Work	Won
2005	San Francisco International Film Festival	Kanbar Award	Screenwriting work	Won
2005	Satellite Award	Best Screenplay, Adapted	Million Dollar Baby	Won
2005	Satellite Award	Outstanding Screenplay, Original	Crash	Nominated
2005	Southeastern Film Critics Association Award	Best Screenplay, Original	Crash	Won
2005	USC Scripter Award	USC Scripter Award	Million Dollar Baby	Won
2005	Washington DC Area Film Critics Association Award	Best Screenplay – Original	Crash	Won
2006	Writers Guild of America Award	Best Original Screenplay	Crash	Won
2006	Academy Awards	Best Picture	Crash	Won
2006	Academy Awards	Best Original Screenplay	Crash	Won
2006	Academy Awards	Best Director	Crash	Nominated
2006	BAFTA Awards	Best Original Screenplay	Crash	Won
2006	BAFTA Awards	Best Direction	Crash	Nominated
2006	Golden Globe Awards	Best Screenplay	Crash	Nominated
2006	Directors Guild of America Award	Outstanding Directorial Achievement in Motion Pictures	Crash	Nominated
2006	Austin Film Critics Award	Best Director	Crash	Won
2006	Broadcast Film Critics Association Award	Best Writer	Crash	Won
2006	Broadcast Film Critics Association Award	Best Director	Crash	Nominated
2006	Chicago Film Critics Association Award	Best Screenplay	Crash	Won
2006	David di Donatello	Best Foreign Film	Crash	Won
2006	Edgar Award	Best Motion Picture Screenplay	Crash	Nominated
2006	Humanitas Prize	Feature Film Category	Crash	Won
2006	Independent Spirit Award	Best First Feature	Crash	Won
2006	London Critics Circle Film Award	Screenwriter of the Year	Crash	Won
2006	London Critics Circle Film Award	Director of the Year	Crash	Nominated
2006	Online Film Critics Society Award	Best Breakthrough Filmmaker	Crash	Won
2006	Online Film Critics Society Award	Best Screenplay, Original	Crash	Nominated
2006	Producers Guild of America Award	Motion Picture Producer of the Year Award	Crash	Nominated
2006	Robert Award	Best American Film	Crash	Nominated
2006	Satellite Award	Best Screenplay, Adapted	Flags of Our Fathers	Nominated
2007	Saturn Award	Best Writing	Casino Royale	Nominated
2007	Edgar Award	Best Motion Picture Screenplay	Casino Royale	Nominated
2007	BAFTA Awards	Outstanding British Film	Casino Royale	Nominated
2007	BAFTA Awards	Best Adapted Screenplay	Casino Royale	Nominated
2007	Venice Film Festival	SIGNIS Award	In the Valley of Elah	Won
2007	Venice Film Festival	Golden Lion	In the Valley of Elah	Nominated
2007	Academy Awards	Best Original Screenplay	Letters from Iwo Jima	Nominated
2008	David di Donatello	Best Foreign Film	In the Valley of Elah	Nominated
2011	Zurich Film Festival	A Tribute To... Award	Lifetime Achievement	Won
2015	Directors Guild of America Awards	Outstanding Directing – Miniseries or Television Film	Show Me a Hero	Nominated

== See also ==
- List of Canadian directors
- List of film and television directors
- List of film producers
- List of Big Five Academy Award winners and nominees
- List of people who have won multiple Academy Awards in a single year
- List of people from Santa Monica, California
- List of people from London, Ontario
- Scientology and celebrities
- Scientology controversies
