= Alan Fudge =

American actor (1944-2011)

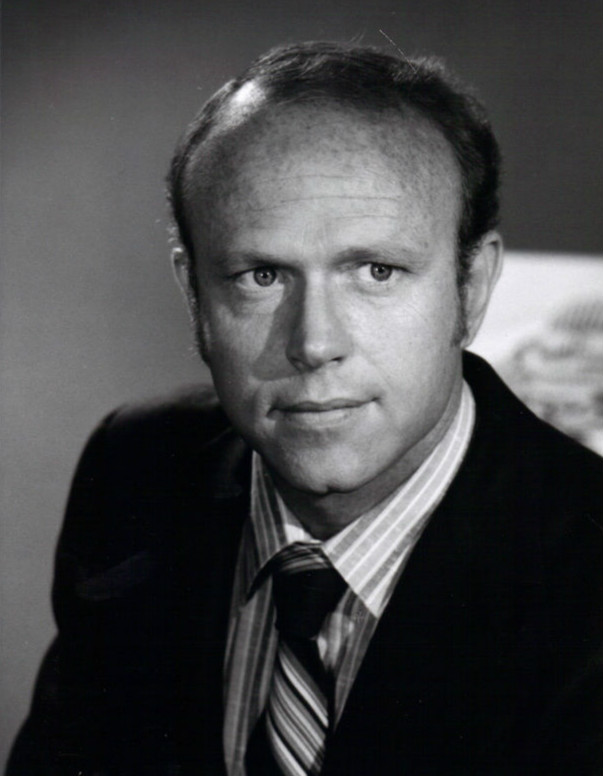
- Fudge as C.W Crawford in NBC's Man from Atlantis, 1977
- Born: February 27, 1944; Wichita, Kansas, U.S.
- Died: October 10, 2011 (aged 67); Los Angeles, California, U.S.
- Education: University of Arizona
- Occupation: Actor
- Years active: 1973–2009

Alan Fudge (February 27, 1944 – October 10, 2011) was an American actor known for his roles in four television programs, Man from Atlantis, Eischied, Paper Dolls and Bodies of Evidence, along with a recurring role on 7th Heaven.

== Early years ==
Fudge was born in Wichita, Kansas. He moved to Tucson, Arizona, at the age of five. He acted with Mary MacMurtrie's Children's Theater in Tucson and with the Tucson Little Theater. He graduated from the University of Arizona with a major in theater. He received the university's Best Actor Award in two seasons worked with the Globe Theater in San Diego during one summer.

== Career ==
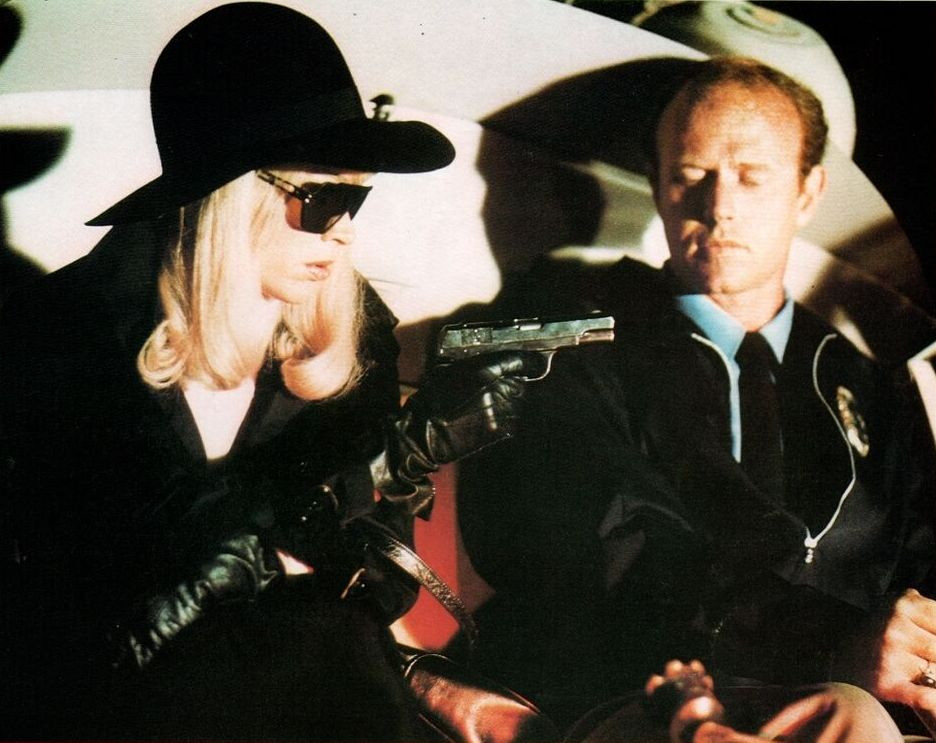
With Karen Black in Family Plot (1976)

On television, Fudge portrayed Lou Dalton in the drama 7th Heaven, C. W. Crawford in the adventure series Man from Atlantis, and Jim Kimbrough in the crime drama Eischied.

Fudge appeared in many television movies based on popular series, such as Columbo: Columbo Goes to the Guillotine, Columbo: Columbo Goes to College, Matlock: The Witness Killings, and Murder, She Wrote: A Story to Die For.

Along with Mike Farrell and James Cromwell, Fudge was one of the finalists in 1975 for the regular role of B. J. Hunnicutt in the television comedy series M*A*S*H. Farrell won the part, and Fudge made a memorable guest appearance in the fourth season episode "Quo Vadis, Captain Chandler?", playing a wounded soldier who believes he is Jesus Christ. The episode was nominated for a Humanitas Prize.

Films in which Fudge appeared include Airport 1975 (1974), Bug (1975), Capricorn One (1978), Chapter Two (1979), The Border (1982), Brainstorm (1983), The Natural (1984), My Demon Lover (1987) and Edward Scissorhands (1990).

Fudge's work on stage included performing at the Charles Playhouse in Boston. For three years, he acted with the APA-Phoenix Theatre. He appeared on Broadway, including being part of the original cast of War and Peace at the Lyceum Theatre in 1967. His other credits on Broadway included Hamlet (1969), The Show Off (1968), Pantagleize (1968), The Cherry Orchard (1968), You Can't Take It With You (1967), The Wild Duck (1967), We, Comrades Three (1966), and The School for Scandal (1966).

== Death ==
Fudge died in Los Angeles at the age of 67, as a result of lung and liver cancer, on October 10, 2011.

== Filmography ==
Year	Title	Role	Notes
1973	Kojak	Gus	Episode: Girl in the River
1973	Two People	Fitzgerald	
1974	Columbo	David Chase	Episode: Publish or Perish
1974	The Man from Independence	Mooney	
1974	Airport 1975	Danton, Salt Lake Controller	
1974–1979	Hawaii Five-O	Various	4 episodes
1975	Bug	Mark Ross	
1975	M*A*S*H	Capt. Arnold Chandler / Jesus Christ	Episode: Quo Vadis, Captain Chandler?
1976	Charlie's Angels	Dave Erhard	Episode: "Lady Killer"
1976	Family Plot	Helicopter Pilot	Uncredited
1977	Barnaby Jones	Glenn Halston	Episode: The Wife Beater
1978	Capricorn One	Capsule Communicator	
1978	The New Adventures of Wonder Woman	Major Cornell	Episode: Flight to Oblivion
1979	The Concorde ... Airport '79	FBI Agent	TV version, Uncredited
1979	Chapter Two	Lee Michaels	
1981	Magnum, P.I.	Security Chief Arthur	Episode: Ghost Writer
1982	The Border	Hawker	
1983	Brainstorm	Robert Jenkins	
1984	The Natural	Ed Hobbs	
1985	The Fall Guy	The FBI Agent	Episode: Femme Fatale
1987	My Demon Lover	Phil Janus	
1985	Dallas	Dr. Lantry	Episode:Saving Grace
1988	Highway to Heaven	Alan Peterson	Episode: Time in a Bottle
1989	Highway to Heaven	Mr. McCormick	Episode: The Source
1989	Breaking In	Detective #3	
1990	Edward Scissorhands	Loan Officer	
1990	Columbo	Mr. Redman	Columbo Goes to College
1991	Northern Exposure	Father Duncan	Season 2, Episode 6
1993	The Liars' Club	Mr. Reynolds	
1993	Home Improvement	Pastor	
1995	Galaxis	Chief of Police	
1996	Baywatch	George Jennings	Season 6 Episode 19 " Sail Away"
1997–2007	7th Heaven	Lou Dalton	27 episodes
2001	The Man Who Wasn't There	Dr. Diedrickson	
2001	Net Worth		
2008	How I Met Your Mother	Farmer Frank	Episode: "The Goat"
2009	The Office	Alan Brand	Episode: "Shareholder Meeting"
