= My Demon Lover =

- Theatrical release poster
- Directed by: Charlie Loventhal
- Written by: Leslie Ray
- Produced by: Gerald T. Olson; Robert Shaye
- Starring: Scott Valentine; Michele Little; Robert Trebor; Alan Fudge; Gina Gallego; Arnold Johnson
- Cinematography: Jacques Haitkin
- Edited by: Ronald Roose
- Music by: David Newman
- Production company: New Line Cinema
- Distributed by: New Line Cinema
- Release date: April 24, 1987
- Running time: 90 minutes
- Country: United States
- Language: English
- Budget: $4 million
- Box office: $3.9 million

My Demon Lover is a 1987 American comedy horror film directed by Charlie Loventhal and written by Leslie Ray. The film stars Scott Valentine, Michele Little, Robert Trebor, Gina Gallego, Alan Fudge, Calvert DeForest and Arnold Johnson. The film was released on April 24 by New Line Cinema.

In the film, a young woman starts a romantic relationship with a street musician. She is unaware that her cursed boyfriend transforms into a demon whenever he feels aroused. Meanwhile, the boyfriend fears that his demonic alter ego may be responsible for a recent series of murders.

== Plot ==
Denny is a young woman who has horrible luck with men. Her latest encounters have been particularly bad, so when she meets a homeless (and horny) street musician, Kaz, she thinks that she may have found a good man. Little does she know that Kaz was cursed by the mother of a young girl he was messing around with while he was in middle school. Whenever he becomes aroused he becomes a demon.

When young women begin to die throughout the city, Kaz begins to wonder if he is "The Mangler" that is murdering them. His worries are compounded when Denny's friend Sonia, a psychic, receives a vision that seems to confirm his suspicions. The killer is ultimately revealed to be Charles, who kidnaps Denny.

To save Denny, Kaz starts kissing Sonia to trigger his transformation. He then saves Denny and is cured of his curse, while Charles is defeated.

== Cast ==
- Scott Valentine as Kaz
- Michele Little as Denny
- Robert Trebor as Charles
- Gina Gallego as Sonia
- Alan Fudge as Phil Janus
- Calvert DeForest as Man in Health Food Store
- Arnold Johnson as Fixer

== Production ==
To distinguish My Demon Lover from werewolf films, Valentine's character was written to change into a multitude of forms. Comic book artist Bernie Wrightson did additional character design and storyboarding for the film.

Shooting took place in Los Angeles and New York, starting in September 1986 and finishing in November.

== Reception ==
The film grossed $1,815,583 in its opening weekend.

My Demon Lover received negative reviews. Janet Maslin wrote in The New York Times that the film bores audiences despite its copious special effects and strange characters. Michael Wilmington of the Los Angeles Times wrote that "though there’s a lot wrong with it, there are things amusingly right about it, too". While acknowledging that some audiences may find it too "overcute and shallow", he said it works better than some big studio comedies. TV Guide's review says that film may have been meant to be satirical, but the film's script and direction make it difficult to take seriously.
