= Michele Little =

American actress

- Born: c. 1960s
- Occupation: Actress
- Years active: 1985–1995, 1998–1999
- Spouse: Brett Cullen (m. 1988)
- Children: 1

Michele Little (born c. 1960s) is an American former actress, best known for her appearances in the 1980s and early 1990s. She retired in 1995 to raise a family after giving birth to a daughter with husband Brett Cullen and again in 1999.

== Filmography ==
Year	Title	Role	Notes
1985	Radioactive Dreams	Rusty Mars	
1985	Appointment with Fear	Carol	
1986	Out of Bounds	Crystal	
1987	Sweet Revenge	Lee	
1987	My Demon Lover	Denny	
1987	Bluffing It	Monica	TV movie
1987	The Return of the Shaggy Dog	Betty	TV movie
1988	The Facts of Life	Claire	TV series; 1 episode
1990	Blue Heat	Anita	
1990	Blood Clan	Katy Bane	
1990	Father Dowling Investigates	Janie Oskowski	TV series; 1 episode
1991	Mystery Date	Stella	
1992	Article 99	Nurse Pierce	
1993	The Perfect Man	Melissa	
1993	Complex of Fear	Madeline	TV movie
1994	Gambler V: Playing for Keeps	Amanda	TV movie
1995	Apollo 13	Jane Conrad	
1998–1999	Legacy	Miss Forrester	TV series; 4 episodes
