= Just the Way You Are (1984 film) =

1984 film by Édouard Molinaro

- Home video release cover
- Directed by: Édouard Molinaro
- Written by: Allan Burns
- Produced by: Léo L. Fuchs
- Starring: Kristy McNichol; Michael Ontkean; Kaki Hunter; Robert Carradine
- Cinematography: Claude Lecomte
- Edited by: Georges Klotz; Claudio Ventura
- Music by: Vladimir Cosma
- Production company: Metro-Goldwyn-Mayer
- Distributed by: MGM/UA Entertainment Company
- Release date: November 16, 1984
- Running time: 94 minutes
- Country: United States
- Language: English
- Budget: $7 million
- Box office: $7,889,694

Just the Way You Are is a 1984 American comedy-drama film starring Kristy McNichol and Michael Ontkean and directed by Édouard Molinaro.

== Plot ==
Susan Berlanger is a professional flautist in Philadelphia who has been handicapped since childhood and is forced to wear a leg brace to get around. She is all set to enter into a lavender marriage with her gay investment banker friend Frank Bantam in order to help him hide his sexuality so he can get ahead in business and get a big promotion, but decides not to when she realizes that the marriage won't meet her (or his) sexual needs. Shortly afterwards she accepts the offer to travel to Europe on a concert tour. While in Paris, she comes up with an idea to disguise her leg by putting it in a cast and travel on her own to the French Alps to be treated without pity. Not looking to find romance, Susan however has become the interest of Peter Nichols, a news photographer. They soon fall in love and Peter dumps his insufferable and narcissistic girlfriend Bobbie for her. Susan is forced to decide if she should tell Peter the truth about herself.

== Main cast ==
- Kristy McNichol as Susan Berlanger
- Michael Ontkean as Peter Nichols
- Kaki Hunter as Lisa Elliott
- André Dussollier as François Rossignol
- Catherine Salviat as Nicole Schallon
- Robert Carradine as Sam Carpenter
- Alexandra Paul as Bobbie
- Lance Guest as Jack, The Answering Service Guy
- Tim Daly as Frank Bantam
- Patrick Cassidy as Steve Haslachez
- Gérard Jugnot as Desk Clerk, Hotel Monte Blanc
- André Oumansky as Paris Doctor
- Billy Kearns as Earl Cooper, Frank's Boss
- Joyce Gordon as Answering Service Lady
- Wayne Robson as Theater Assistant Manager
- Jean-Claude Ostrander as French Ski Instructor
- Garrick Dowhen as Bill Holland, American Ski Coach

== Production ==
The movie was filmed in Toronto and in France. In France, Kristy McNichol suffered an emotional breakdown while filming, and production had to be interrupted for a year while she recovered. Kristy said she was ready to go back to work within a month, but that shooting the snow scenes for the film's second-half would have to wait until the following winter. "It was the hardest thing I've ever done in my life getting through that film."
