= The Return of the Shaggy Dog =

- Genre: Adventure; Biography; Drama
- Written by: Paul Haggis; Diane Wilk
- Directed by: Stuart Gillard
- Starring: Gary Kroeger; Todd Waring; Michele Little; Cindy Morgan; Jane Carr; Gavin Reed
- Music by: David Bell
- Country of origin: United States
- Original language: English

Production
- Producers: Justis Greene; Harvey Marks; Markus S. McLean
- Production location: Vancouver
- Cinematography: Fred J. Koenekamp
- Editors: Michael F. Anderson; Dennis C. Duckwall; Jack Harnish
- Running time: 100 minutes
- Production company: Walt Disney Television

Original release
- Network: ABC
- Release: November 1 – November 8, 1987

The Return of the Shaggy Dog is a 1987 American two-part made-for-television comedy film produced by Walt Disney Television. The film is set in the 17 years between the events portrayed in The Shaggy Dog (1959) and The Shaggy D.A. (1976). It was broadcast on November 1 and 8, 1987 as a Disney Sunday Movie presentation on ABC.

== Plot ==
The film follows the adventures of Wilby Daniels, now a successful lawyer, who has proposed marriage to his girlfriend Betty. However, an aged Professor Plumcutt dies and his last words are that his infamous enchanted Borgia ring that transforms people into Old English Sheepdogs is to be inherited by Wilby, which again sets another sheepdog transformation in progress when the professors' evil, bumbling caretakers seek it for themselves. Wilby's younger brother "Moochie", now a full-grown man, comes to Wilby's aid when the curse reactivates, and Wilby agrees to help him in exchange by getting cast as the perfect dog for a dog food commercial, as Moochie is a struggling casting director. Together, Wilby and Moochie must once again break the Borgia curse before Wilby's wedding to Betty, but this time by Wilby carrying out Professor Plumcutt's last wish to take ownership of the cursed ring and thus put an end to dog transformations.

== Cast ==
- Gary Kroeger as Wilby Daniels
- Todd Waring as Montgomery "Moochie" Daniels
- Michele Little as Betty
- Cindy Morgan as Laura Wells
- Jane Carr as Myra
- Gavin Reed as Carl

== Production note ==
- This third feature marks the end of the original story with Wilby Daniels as the son of Wilson and Freeda Daniels.
- Though this film is the third produced, chronologically it would seem to fit between the films The Shaggy Dog and The Shaggy D.A.
- It was featured on The Disney Sunday Movie, being preceded by the 1959 film The Shaggy Dog. In keeping with the tradition that Walt Disney introduced films, The Return of the Shaggy Dog was introduced by Disney CEO Michael Eisner, who attempts to invoke the transformation on Wilby, but when Eisner states the words, he has passed on the curse from Wilby to himself.
