= Kerry Remsen =

American actress

- Born: September 22, 1964 (age 62); United States
- Other names: Kerry Cates, Kerry Remsen Phillips
- Occupations: Actress, Acting coach, Dance instructor
- Years active: 1981–1995
- Father: Bert Remsen

Kerry Remsen (born September 22, 1964) is an American actress. She is the daughter of actor Bert Remsen and casting director Barbara Joyce Dodd, sister of Ann Remsen Manners and has been married to Ron Cates since 2006. She attended the U.S. Grant High School in Van Nuys, California. She has appeared in more than twenty films and television programs. She was a regular cast member of 1990s soap opera by Leah Laiman, Tribes. She is also most remembered by horror fans for her small part in A Nightmare on Elm Street 2: Freddy's Revenge, and supporting and co-starring roles in Pumpkinhead and Ghoulies II.

== Background ==
Kerry Remsen's mother, Barbara Joyce Dodd, was an actress and played Granny in Employee of the Month. Her actor father, Bert Remsen, died on April 22, 1999, aged 74. Her older sister is Ann Manners.

In addition to her more than 25-year career in film, she is the founder of ACT, Acting Communication Training, an organization that works to boost the morale and confidence of at-risk children in inner-city schools. Part of her work has been with the Payson Road Organization to help children with eating disorders. In 2001, she was working with the organization's founder, Sarah Mason, a Los Angeles-based screenwriter at the time to organize the "Road to the Stars" event to raise support and awareness. She is also a children's dance instructor and private acting coach.

== Career ==
=== 1980s ===
Throughout the 1980s, Remsen appeared in at least ten movies, with two of them made for television. Some of those films were the best known horror films of the decade. She also appeared in six different television programs. She had a part as a teenager in Jacqueline Susann's Valley of the Dolls, a 1981 TV movie which was directed by Walter Grauman. Then she had a credited role as Chris in Not My Kid, which was directed Michael Tuchner, and released in 1985. She then had a part as a stage manager in The Facts of Life episode "3, 2, 1". She then had a major role as Samantha in the Jim Wilson directed 1986 film Smart Alec, which also starred Ben Glass, Antony Alda, Orson Bean and Natasha Kautsky. The next movie she appeared in was the made-for-television film Dreams of Gold: The Mel Fisher Story, which was directed by James Goldstone and starred Cliff Robertson and Loretta Swit. Her role as Taffi Fisher, the youngest child of the treasure hunter Mel Fisher (Robertson) was a prominent one. In 1987, she appeared in 21 Jump Street, CBS Schoolbreak Special, and Our House. She then appeared in Two Moon Junction, which was directed by Zalman King. She played the part of Carolee.

The 1980s saw Remsen appear in some well known horror films. She had a part in A Nightmare on Elm Street 2: Freddy's Revenge, which was released in 1985. Another film released the same year was Ramsey Thomas's Appointment with Fear, in which she played the part of Heather. She was a prominent cast member in the 1988 film Pumpkinhead which was directed by Stan Winston. She played the part of Maggie, the girlfriend of Joel Hoffman's character Steve. Also released that year was Ghoulies II, directed by Albert Band. In that film she had a prominent part playing the role of Nicole, who teams up with Larry (Damon Martin) to find a way to send the titular creatures back to hell. In 1989, she appeared in the Jim & Ken Wheat, directed and produced After Midnight. The film was in three parts with a different story in each. She played the part of Maggie in the "Allison's Story" segment.

=== 1990s ===
In 1990, Remsen appeared on stage at the Friends Theatre in the play Montana, playing the part of Gayle. Also in 1990, she landed a regular role as Pamela in Tribes. She appeared in the first episode which aired on 5 March that year. She appeared in a total of 65 of the show's 101 episodes, with her last airing on 1 June. Later that year she appeared as Trish in the Doogie Howser, M.D. episode "Car Wars".

In 1992, the comedy film Round Numbers was released. The cast included Kate Mulgrew, Samantha Eggar, Marty Ingels, and Rick Dano. Remsen's sister Anne Remsen Manners was involved in the casting. Rremsen played the part of Constance, and was credited as Kerry Remsen Phillips.

== Later years ==
As a coach, one of the actors she coached was Jason Ellefson, who went on to appear in Melrose Place, and 6 Guns. Other actors she worked with include Jennifer Holloway who had appeared as Barb in American Horror Story, and Jase Lindgren.

In Eric Shirey's review of Ghoulies and Ghoulies II for Scream Factory's Blu-ray release, interviews of her along with producer Charles Band, and special effects artist Gino Crognale are noted as the bonus features for Ghoulies II.

== Filmography ==
Television
Year	Title	Role	Notes	Director
1985	The Facts of Life	Stage Manager	Episode: "3, 2, 1:	John Bowab
1986	Family Ties	Rennie	Episode: "Starting Over"	Steven Robman
1987	21 Jump Street	Tracy	Episode: "The Worst Night of Your Life"	Rob Bowman
1987	CBS Schoolbreak Special	Jerri	Episode: "An Enemy Among Us"	Arthur Allan Seidelman
1987	Our House		Episode: "Sounds from a Silent Clock: Part 1"	Ray Austin
1989	ABC Afterschool Specials	Receptionist	Episode: "Torn Between Two Fathers"	Richard Masur
1990	Doogie Howser, M.D.	Trish	Episode: "Car Wars"	Brad Silberling
1990	Tribes	Pamela	65 Episodes	Various
1995	Beverly Hills, 90210	Receptionist	Episode: "Song for My Mother"	Chip Chalmers

Film
Year	Title	Role	Notes	Director
1981	Jacqueline Susann's Valley of the Dolls	Teenage Girl	TV movie	Walter Grauman
1985	Not My Kid	Chris	TV movie	Michael Tuchner
1985	Appointment with Fear	Heather	Aka Deadly Presence	Ramsey Thomas
1985	A Nightmare on Elm Street 2: Freddy's Revenge	Girlfriend		Jack Sholder
1986	Smart Alec	Samantha		Jim Wilson
1986	Dreams of Gold: The Mel Fisher Story	Taffi Fisher	TV movie	James Goldstone
1988	Two Moon Junction	Carolee		Zalman King
1988	Pumpkinhead	Maggie		Stan Winston
1988	Ghoulies II	Nicole		Albert Band
1989	After Midnight	Maggie	Segment: "Allison's Story"	Jim Wheat; Ken Wheat
1992	Round Numbers	Constance		Nancy Zala
1995	Indictment: The McMartin Trial	Mother		Mick Jackson
1995	White Man's Burden	Pregnant Woman		Desmond Nakano

Documentary
Year	Title	Role	Notes
2008	Pumpkinhead Unearthed	Herself	Project supervisor: Aine Leicht
2015	Ghoulies II: More Toilets, More Terror - The Making of Ghoulies II	Herself	
