= Dreams of Gold: The Mel Fisher Story =

1986 film by James Goldstone

- Genre: Drama
- Written by: Stanford Whitmore
- Directed by: James Goldstone
- Starring: Cliff Robertson; Loretta Swit; Ed O'Ross
- Music by: Ernest Gold
- Country of origin: United States
- Original language: English

Production
- Executive producer: Max A. Keller
- Producers: Charles Hairston; Daniel Helfgott
- Production locations: St. Croix, U.S. Virgin Islands
- Cinematography: Eric Van Haren Noman
- Editor: Edward A. Biery
- Running time: 95 minutes
- Production companies: Interplanetary Pictures Productions; La Rosh Productions

Original release
- Network: CBS
- Release: November 15, 1986

Dreams of Gold: The Mel Fisher Story is a 1986 American made-for-television drama film starring Cliff Robertson and Loretta Swit. It is based on the actual adventures of Treasure Hunter Mel Fisher and premiered on CBS on November 15, 1986.

== Background ==
The role of Fisher was played by Cliff Robertson and his wife Deo was played by Loretta Swit. The story centers around Fisher's hunt for the Atocha treasure, and Fisher's 17 obsession-driven year search for the galleon Nuestra Señora de Atocha that vanished in 1622 while being caught in a hurricane off the coast of Florida. It also looks at Fisher's obsession and the effect it had on his family, and the courts that were trying to shut him down.

During the making of the movie, Cliff Robertson was approached by Mel Fisher himself, telling him he had a map and they would meet again. Both he and Robertson are pictured in George Walter Born's Historic Florida Keys: An Illustrated History of Key West & the Keys, with Robertson holding a small treasure chest of silver coins and a gold chain.

Deo Fisher mentioned one inaccuracy in the film. Her character played by Loretta Swit was cooking in the film and she commented that everyone that knew her knows she didn't cook.

== Technical and other ==
The film's production company was Inter Planetary Productions. It was released on November 15, 1986. The DVD was released on February 10, 1998.

=== VHS releases ===
- Goldhill Home Media - November 21, 2000 – 87 minutes
- BWE Video, January 1, 2000 - Part of a set of four VHS tapes, with a total running time 371 Minutes
  Vol 1: Dreams of Gold, Narrated by Cliff Robertson and Loretta Switt.
  Vol II: Gold Rush on Mount Diwata (Part 1&2); The Sunken Peacock Throne; and The Treasure Ships of the Bass Straight.
  Vol III: Treasure of the Kronan; The Ghost Fleet of Vigo;and Secrets of the Cocos Island.
  Vol IV: Yamashita's Gold; The Emerald King of Rio Minero; and The Last Voyage of Captain Kidd.

=== DVD releases ===
- The Simitar, 7278 release runs for 87 minutes and is in monophonic sound format.

=== Soundtrack ===
Songs featured in the movie

- The Ebonites Steel Orchestra - "Blue Nose"
- The Ebonites Steel Orchestra - "True Love"
- Kevin McKnelly and Don Sterling - "She's On My Mind"
- Saloon - "Dreams Of Gold"
- Saloon - Ridin' The Wind"
- Saloon - Never Gonna Go Back There Again"
- Saloon - Doin' The Best That You Can"

== Cast ==
List
| Name | Role |
|---|---|
| Cliff Robertson | Mel Fisher |
| Loretta Swit | Deo Fisher |
| Ed O'Ross | Trooper Hudley |
| Scott Paulin | Don Kincaid |
| Jennifer Runyon | Angel Fisher |
| Judi Evans | Penelope Cabot |
| Bruce Toms | Kane Fisher |
| Kerry Remsen | Taffi Fisher |
| Jonathan Hogan | David Horan |
| Martin Rabbett | Dirk Fisher |
| William Zabka | Kim Fisher |
| Steven Williams | Mo |
| Don Hood | Luther Banks |
| Liam Sullivan | Rupert Carmody |
| Brett Porter | Duncan Mathewson |
| Byrne Piven | Local Fisherman |
| Tim Wise | 1st Panel Member |
| David Orange | 2nd Panel Member |
| Sandra P. Davis | Tourist |
| Tony Ayer | 3rd Panel Member |
| Eric Matthews | Marshall |
