= Appointment with Fear (film) =

1985 film

- Theatrical release poster
- Directed by: Ramsey Thomas (Note: Credited as Alan Smithee.)
- Written by: Bruce Meade; Ramsey Thomas
- Produced by: Moustapha Akkad; Tom Boutross
- Starring: Douglas Rowe; Michele Little; Kerry Remsen; Pamela Bach; Garrick Dowhen
- Cinematography: Nicholas von Sternberg
- Edited by: Paul Jasiukonis
- Music by: Andrea Saparoff
- Production companies: Moviestore Entertainment; Trancas International Films
- Distributed by: Galaxy International Pictures
- Release date: 1985
- Running time: 96 minutes
- Country: United States
- Language: English

Appointment with Fear, also known as Deadly Presence, is a 1985 American horror film directed by Ramsey Thomas for Moustapha Akkad and Moviestore Entertainment. The film stars Michele Little, Douglas Rowe, Garrick Dowhen, and Kerry Remsen.

The film had theatrical release in 1985 by Galaxy International Pictures and release on VHS in October 1987 by International Video Entertainment, followed in 1991 by Live Entertainment. Ramsey Thomas had his name removed from the project, replacing it with the pseudonym Alan Smithee.

== Plot ==
A mysterious and unidentified man in a white Ford van gets out and stabs his wife on the portico of a house. Before she dies, she gives her infant son to Heather and urges her to keep him safe, knowing that his father will try to kill him. Detective Kowalski, an off-beat, seedy-looking detective, follows the case. Kowalski later finds out the killer is in solitary confinement in the state mental facility but is somehow leaving his body in spirit and is under an Ancient Egyptian curse which gives him a need to kill his son to be "King of the Forest" for another year. Kowalski later visits a specialist seeking advice on confronting the Ancient Egyptian spirit and curse. Carol, Heather's friend, who loves recording sounds, spots the white van following her in her pickup truck and becomes suspicious. She informs her love interest, Bobby, of her fears, and he dismisses them and punctures the tire of the van, which is parked nearby.

Heather takes the baby to a luxury mansion and cares for him with Carol. She has a dream in which she predicts the murder of the boy and becomes extremely anxious. Detective Kowalski, meanwhile, has his car hijacked in the wilderness by the killer's spirit and blown to smithereens. The killer learns of his son's whereabouts and, unknown initially to Carol, kills another of her friends and an old vagrant who lives in the back of her truck at the house. He then murders Samantha, another of Carol's friends, in the jacuzzi. After discovering Samantha, Carol runs outside with a shotgun and shoots at the white van, although the killer is not present. Then, after discovering the body of her other friend, Carol remarks that she thinks the killer is trying to kill the baby. Carol orders Bobby to go upstairs and protect Heather and the baby and vows to "kill the bastard".

Bobby discovers that Heather is missing and the baby is alone, and then departs on his bike/sidecar and finds the detective. The killer breaks in through a window and is set on fire by Carol, prompting the spirit to leave the burning body and manifest itself again. The killer is then seen leaving the house with the baby in his arms and is confronted by Carol with a shotgun, who orders him to give up the child. When he refuses and lays the baby down by a tree and attempts to perform a ritual, Carol shoots him several times, with no effect. Bobby and the detective arrive on the scene, and the detective urges her to pierce the killer with a nearby pole. As she does so, a dramatic scene occurs with a flash to the body in the mental ward, and it explodes and is followed by a strong wind where the spirit had been. Bobby presents the baby in safe arms to Heather, who remarks, "Isn't he beautiful?". As she looks away, supernatural green lights appear in the baby's eyes as the credits roll.

== Partial cast ==
- Douglas Rowe as Detective Kowalski
- Michele Little as Carol
- Kerry Remsen as Heather
- Garrick Dowhen as The Man
- Pamela Bach as Samantha
- James Avery as Connors
- Danny Dayton as Norman
- Mike Gomez as Joe "Little Joe"
- Debi Sue Voorhees as Ruth
- Peter Griffin as George
- Michael Wyle as Bobby
- Vincent Barbour as The Cowboy
- Gertrude Clement as Old Woman
- Nick Conti as Young Detective
- Brioni Farrell as Mrs. Sorenson
- Kathi Gibbs as Cleo
- Charlotte Speer as Mrs. Pierce
