= Edward A. Biery =

American film editor (1920–2012)

- Born: September 8, 1920; California, United States
- Died: September 24, 2012 (aged 92); Simi Valley, California, United States
- Occupation: Film editor

Edward A. Biery (September 8, 1920 – September 24, 2012) was an American film editor. He worked with director James Goldstone several times, editing such films as Swashbuckler, Rollercoaster and When Time Ran Out. He has also edited several TV programs including; Kent State, Charles & Diana: A Royal Love Story, Calamity Jane, Dreams of Gold: The Mel Fisher Story and The Adventures of Kit Carson.
