= Tribes (TV series) =

American soap opera

- Main title card
- Genre: Soap opera Teen drama
- Created by: Leah Laiman
- Written by: Trent Jones
- Country of origin: United States
- Original language: English
- No. of seasons: 1
- No. of episodes: 95

Production
- Executive producer: Dennis Steinmetz
- Running time: 30 minutes
- Production companies: FSO Productions; 20th Century Fox Television

Original release
- Network: Fox
- Release: March 5 – July 13, 1990

Tribes is a daily half-hour soap opera that aired briefly on Fox in 1990. Created by veteran soap writer Leah Laiman, the series was targeted at a teen audience.

== Overview ==
Laiman described Tribes as "a cross between a daytime soap opera, MTV and an after-school special." Set in Southern California, the series follows a group of teenagers and was "geared to catch the teen and pre-teen audience before they begin homework or go out for the evening." Tribes Executive Producer Dennis Steinmetz, a veteran of CBS' The Young and the Restless and The Bold and the Beautiful, said:

There is a large teen and young adult population who watches soaps. From my experience, what has happened is, whenever school is out, the popularity of daytime genre shows swells considerably. On The Young and the Restless, they would write teen-oriented material during the summer and the Christmas breaks.

Noting that the show was not just for teenagers, Fox executive vice president of program development Steven Chow said, "It's about the relationship between teens and their parents". Steinmetz concurred, saying "I think anyone can watch this. The stories are universal ... We tell stories about teens which affect adults." Laiman noted that the focus of Tribes is "how children respond to what's happening in their families", citing the storyline in which a mother starts drinking to cope with her divorce. Steinmetz said of the show's "comedic moments":

We're trying to lighten the heaviness of daytime drama. But we're not going to be escapist. We're telling real stories and hoping the lighter moments come out of those real stories. I don't think kids or teen-agers walk around with the weight of the world on their shoulders all the time.

== Cast ==
- Ele Keats as Anny Kubiak
- Kim Valentine as Stacey Cox
- Lisa Lawrence as Melinda Cox
- Zero Hubbard as Daryl Johnson
- Greg Watkins as Billy Pressfield
- Patrick Day as Chris Pressfield
- Michael Aron as Peter Sego
- Scott Garrison as Matt Kubiak
- Jill Whitlow as Lorraine Delaney
- Michelle Stafford as Frankie
- Kerry Remsen as Pamela

== Production ==
Called a "low-budget show" by Laiman, Tribes was produced "like a movie-of-the-week", and one-third of the material was shot on location. Steinmetz explained:

We package five shows, and in some cases six shows, into a group and assign them to a director. We'll block it out like a movie. It's shot very much out of sequence. We also have alternating directing teams and producing teams. We do two location days and three studio days for each five episodes.

Laiman said of the mostly inexperienced young cast:

I will tell you very frankly that the first shows are not the best, because we're dealing with young actors. They're new; they're very raw. But as the shows go on and they get comfortable with each other, there are some changes. It takes a little time to shake out a new show, and I think the later shows are much better ... They really are kids. Unlike other shows, we don't have somebody 26 who's playing somebody 16. Some of them are very good actors, and some of them are learning. They're not fabulous. They're not great, but they have such personal charm that I think they'll be able to carry it until they learn to work a little more relaxed.

Noting that the series must explore potentially controversial issues to be viable, Laiman explained:

We've already run up against standards and practices. We have to be very careful, especially with an issue like abortion, which obviously is very volatile. I've had to draw a fine line between my beliefs and wanting to espouse them to every character on the show, and what other people believe. We have to be careful not to offend to such an extreme that we will lose viewers. This is an entertainment show. It's not a soapbox. We try to be so evenhanded that nobody, or everybody, gets offended. We do have a story where a girl goes to talk about abortion, and we try to present all the issues, but it's very difficult ... We have not written the issue of drugs, simply because we thought it was one of the most obvious," she said. "We will address that issue, and we are addressing teenage pregnancy, and we're talking about safe sex and abortion. Also cheating, which is a very prevalent problem in school ... As for the gay issue, I would never say never. We talked about it originally, but we are not doing it yet. I want to do things kids want to watch. Once you get them watching, then you can introduce issues they need to know about. Most teenagers are not ready to talk about a gay lifestyle. Those who are gay are not necessarily ready to deal with it, and those who aren't are so grossed out by it that they're not ready to listen to what the possibilities are.

Asked about Tribes, veteran soap writer Agnes Nixon — creator of the American daytime serials One Life to Live, All My Children and Loving — commented on the concept of a teen-focused soap opera:

I wouldn't attempt it because I feel there would be so many problems. Maybe somebody else knows something or has some ideas that I don't have, but I like a soap opera to reflect life as much as possible, which means all age groups and ethnic groups. I think the teenage story is a very important element, but I don't personally know how you'd do it [with only that]. I'd think it would be very limiting in terms of storytelling ... We've just done the 20th year of All My Children. If you're doing only teenage stories, you can't follow them growing up. We've still got five of the original cast members playing the same characters. Erica has grown from a high school girl to a mature woman. She was the teenage story back 20 years ago ... It would never be my project. I would find the very concept of it hampering, but I wish them luck.

== Broadcast ==
Debuting on its own stations, Fox hoped Tribes would be picked up for national syndication like its reality legal series Cops and America's Most Wanted. The soap opera was scheduled to premiere in January 1990, but a week before its debut it was pushed back to March by Fox executives who "feared that it would get lost in the competitive February ratings sweeps". Laiman, understanding of the decision and calling Fox "very conservative when it comes to advertising dollars", nonetheless noted that the delay put the series at a disadvantage. According to Laiman, most of the initial 65 episodes would be completed before the series premiere, which would not allow for the changes that might be made during production based on audience reaction to the series. She noted, "When it's on the air, you can see things and change them ... It's a problem we have to live with."

Tribes premiered on March 5, 1990 in the 6:30 p.m. time slot on the Fox-owned stations in Los Angeles (KTTV), New York (WNYW), Chicago (WFLD), Washington (WTTG), Dallas–Fort Worth (KDAF), Houston (KRIV) and Boston (WFXT). The Los Angeles Times called it the first American youth-oriented serial drama. Originally contracted for a 13-week run, Tribes ultimately aired for 19 weeks. The series' cancellation was announced in June, and its final airdate was July 13, 1990.
