= Deborah Rennard =

American actress, writer and producer

- Born: November 4, 1960 (age 65); Los Angeles, California, U.S.
- Occupations: Actress, writer, producer
- Years active: 1981–present
- Spouse: Paul Haggis (m. 1997; div. 2016)
- Children: 1

Deborah Rennard (born November 4, 1960) is an American actress, writer and producer, best known for her role as Sly Lovegren in Dallas (1981–1991).

== Life and career ==
Rennard was born in Los Angeles, California. In 1981 she was cast in a recurring role on Dallas as J.R. Ewing's loyal secretary Sylvia "Sly" Lovegren. She appeared in the series from 1981 to 1991 and later was cast in the 1996 film J.R. Returns. After Dallas, she had role in daytime soap operas Days of Our Lives and Sunset Beach, and guest starred on Silk Stalkings, Kung Fu: The Legend Continues, and Due South. In film, Rennard played the leading role as Harmony in the 1986 science fiction action film Land of Doom. She starred as Cynthia alongside Jean-Claude Van Damme in the 1990 martial arts film Lionheart. She later appeared in films Kazaam (1996) and Gang Related (1997). She left acting and as of late 1990s began career as stage producer. She co-produced the short-lived 1997 CBS crime drama series EZ Streets and the 2007 crime drama film In the Valley of Elah.

Rennard met her future husband, Academy Awards-winning director Paul Haggis, during the filming of Due South in 1994. In 1997, Rennard married Haggis. They divorced in 2016. She grew up in the Church of Scientology and privately left the group around the time of his highly contentious exit from the church. She said the end of their marriage happened for other reasons, unrelated to the church exit.

After the divorce, Rennard returned to acting appearing in episodes of FBI: Most Wanted and Law & Order in 2022. In 2023, she played lead character's mother in the horror-comedy film Appendage.

== Filmography ==
=== Film ===
Year	Title	Role	Notes
1986	Land of Doom	Harmony	
1990	Lionheart	Cynthia Caldera	
1996	Kazaam	Malik's Dinner Mate	
1996	Dallas: J.R. Returns	Sylvia 'Sly' Lovegren	TV movie
1997	Gang Related	Caroline Divinci	
2007	In the Valley of Elah		Producer
2021	Deck the Heart	Elaine Stein	
2021	You Can Never Go Home Again	May Malcolm	
2021	The Families Feud	Stella	
2023	Appendage	Stacy	

=== Television ===
Year	Title	Role	Notes
1981–1991	Dallas	Sylvia 'Sly' Lovegren	Recurring role, 188 episodes
1985	Hardcastle and McCormick	Lucy	Episode: "Strangle Hold"
1989	Freddy's Nightmares	Britt	Episode: "Dreams That Kill"
1990	Hardball	Melinda	Episode: "The Cool Katt"
1991	Days of Our Lives	Whitney Baker	Recurring role
1991	Silk Stalkings	Monica Cameron	Episode: "Going to Babylon"
1994	Side Effects	Lesley Carswell	Episode: "In Sickness and in Health"
1994–1995	Due South	Dr. Esther Pearson	Recurring role, 5 episodes
1995	Kung Fu: The Legend Continues	Lilly Montgomery Caine	Episode: "Gunfighters"
1995	Forever Knight	Julia Winwood	Episode: "Partners of the Month"
1995	TekWar	Rachel	Episode: "Zero Tolerance"
1997	Michael Hayes	Christine Speyers	Episode: "Slaves"
1998	Sunset Beach	Dr. Julie Fenmore	Recurring role
2000–2001	Family Law	DDA Ann Hoffner	Episodes: "The Choice" and "Safe at Home"
2015	Show Me a Hero	Poodle Lady	Episode: 1.6
2022	FBI: Most Wanted	Jodee Perwin	Episode: "Incel"
2022	Law & Order	Audrey White	Episode: "Wicked Game"
2022	East New York	Brenda Sykes	Episode: "Pilot"
