= Zero Hubbard =

American film, stage and television actor

- Hubbard in 2013
- Born: Zerondrick Hubbard; February 22, 1971; Little Rock, Arkansas, U.S.
- Died: May 2025 (aged 54)
- Occupations: Film, stage and television actor

Zerondrick Hubbard (February 22, 1971 – May 2025) was an American film, stage and television actor. He was best known for playing the recurring role of Fabian DeWitt in the American police procedural television series Hill Street Blues.

== Life and career ==
Hubbard was born in Little Rock, Arkansas. He attended acting school with Todd Bridges. He began his screen career in 1984, appearing in the ABC sitcom television series Benson. In the same year, he appeared in the NBC sitcom televisision series Diff'rent Strokes.

Later in his career, in 1986, Hubbard appeared in the film Odd Jobs, playing Brad. In 1988, he starred as Neil, the homeless lover in the stage play The Model Apartment, starring along with Erica Yohn, Milton Selzer and Chloe Webb. In 1990, he starred as Daryl Johnson in the Fox soap opera television series Tribes. He guest-starred in television programs including Trapper John, M.D., L.A. Law, Bodies of Evidence, Hell Town, What's Happening Now!! and The Royal Family, and played the recurring role of Fabian DeWitt, the adopted son of Lucille Bates (Betty Thomas), in the NBC police procedural television series Hill Street Blues.

Hubbard retired from acting in 2003, last appearing in the film Black Ball.

== Death ==
Hubbard died in May 2025, at the age of 54.
