= The Outrageous Okona =

- Star Trek: The Next Generation episode
- Episode no.: Season 2 Episode 4
- Directed by: Robert Becker
- Story by: Les Menchen; Lance Dickson; David Landsberg
- Teleplay by: Burton Armus
- Cinematography by: Edward R. Brown
- Production code: 130
- Original air date: December 12, 1988

Guest appearances
- William O. Campbell – Thadiun Okona; Douglas Rowe – Debin; Albert Stratton – Kushell; Rosalind Ingledew – Yanar; Kieran Mulroney – Benzan; Joe Piscopo – The Comic; Whoopi Goldberg – Guinan; Teri Hatcher – B.G. Robinson (uncredited Transporter Chief)

Episode chronology
| ← Previous "Elementary, Dear Data" | Next → "Loud as a Whisper" |
- Star Trek: The Next Generation season 2

"The Outrageous Okona" (/oʊˈkɒnə/ oh-KON-ə) is the fourth episode of the second season of the American science fiction television series Star Trek: The Next Generation, the 30th episode overall. It was first aired on December 12, 1988, in broadcast syndication. It was written by Les Menchen, Lance Dickson and David Landsberg, with a teleplay by Burton Armus, and directed by Robert Becker.

Set in the 24th century, the series follows the adventures of the Starfleet crew of the Federation starship Enterprise-D. In this episode, the crew of the Enterprise encounters a flamboyant space rogue, while Data tries to learn humor from a holographic comedian.

Guest stars in this episode include Billy Campbell, credited as William O. Campbell, and Teri Hatcher, in an uncredited role.

== Plot ==
As the Federation starship Enterprise, under the command of Captain Jean-Luc Picard, passes through the Coalition of Madena, it detects a small cargo ship, under manual control by its occupant. The crew makes contact with the pilot, Captain Thadiun Okona (William O. Campbell), who requests help to repair a part on his ship. Captain Picard agrees and the Enterprise tows Okona's ship while Okona is brought on board. The crew soon finds that Okona has taken a keen interest in the women on the ship, beginning with Transporter Chief Robinson (Teri Hatcher in an uncredited role) and is in no rush to effect repairs.

Continuing through the sector, the Enterprise is set upon by ships from two planets, each of which locks its weapons upon the Enterprise, though both are vastly outclassed. Debin (Douglas Rowe), from the planet Atlec, accuses Okona of impregnating his daughter Yanar (Rosalind Ingledew), while Kushell (Albert Stratton) from the planet Straleb asserts that Okona has stolen a state treasure, the Jewel of Thesia. The two leaders clearly know each other and both demand that their claim on Okona takes precedence. Okona denies both allegations but offers nothing to defend himself with. Picard offers to arbitrate the dispute and brings Debin, Yanar, Kushell, and Benzan (Kieran Mulroney), Kushell's son, aboard the Enterprise. Okona sits and quietly listens to both Debin and Kushell's arguments but does not offer any evidence to defend himself from both allegations.

After much more arguing amongst the two leaders, Okona then declares that he is the father of Yanar's child and offers to marry her. Benzan then declares that the Jewel of Thesia hasn't been stolen: it is revealed that Okona has been acting as a go-between for Yanar and Benzan, who are in love with each other, and that Yanar is pregnant with Benzan's child; Benzan has offered to marry Yanar, intending to present the Jewel of Thesia, which he asserts is rightly his, as a courting gift. Okona was carrying the jewel between the two planets when he suffered engine trouble and he falsely claimed to be the father to force the two lovers to reveal the truth. Embarrassed and frustrated with how her relationship with Benzan has caused Okona to get into trouble and the quarreling of their parents, especially her father's pressuring her to marry to preserve her family's honor, an exasperated Yanar declares that she is not marrying Benzan or Okona. Okona has a heart-to-heart conversation with Yanar about how she cannot throw away her relationship simply because their parents cannot "behave themselves". Yanar takes heed to Okona's advice. She and Benzan profess their love to each other in front of Debin and Kushell, who finally realize how happy their children are with each other. Picard cannot get involved in the internal political disputes between the two planets and allows Okona to go on his way once his ship is repaired; Debin and Kushell are left to argue (in a friendly manner) about wedding details.

Lt. Commander Data is motivated to explore the concept of humor after meeting Okona. Prompted by Guinan, Data uses the holodeck to generate a comedy club setting and stand-up comic (played by Joe Piscopo) as his adviser but when he performs in front of the holographic audience, he is dismayed to find that they laugh at anything he says or does. Guinan cheers Data up by explaining that being able to laugh or make people laugh is not the final result of becoming human. As the Enterprise parts with Okona, Data is able to unintentionally make the crew laugh but does not at first understand the joke.

== Production ==
=== Casting ===
Billy Campbell was credited as William O. Campbell for his role as Okona, differentiating him from William Campbell who appeared in the Star Trek: The Original Series episodes "The Squire of Gothos" and "The Trouble with Tribbles". Billy Campbell was a candidate for the role of Commander William T. Riker, but executive producer Rick Berman has explained that the executives casting the series considered Campbell to be "too soft" and the role went to Jonathan Frakes instead.

Jerry Lewis had been scheduled to appear in "The Outrageous Okona", but was unable to play the role of the Comic due to a conflict with a guest appearance on Wiseguy. Instead, Joe Piscopo performed the role with Lewis in mind. Piscopo was known at the time for his previous performances on Saturday Night Live, and ad-libbed the majority of his lines in "The Outrageous Okona". Teri Hatcher was cast as Chief B.G. Robinson, but after the majority of her performance was cut from the episode, she asked not to be credited for the appearance.

=== Music ===
The episode's score was recorded at Stage M, on the Paramount Studios lot in Hollywood. It was composed by Ron Jones, who sought to use a musical theme using french horns for Okona to show him as "a knight in shining armor, a throwback to Errol Flynn". This same motif is used in a manner of ways throughout the episode with Jones re-recording it using different elements of the brass section as well as modifying it electronically. For the sequences with Data on the holodeck, he opted to keep the music simple by giving those scenes a jazz background.

Jones was critical of the executive producer's decision not to have any music being played in the Ten Forward bar. He argued that there would be some background music in the location as opposed to silence. He offered to compose some pieces, and let the producers drop them if they did not like them but they refused. Jones had created an algorithm to estimate what music would be like in the future while lecturing in Malta and offered to use this, adding that Jimi Hendrix would be considered akin to classical music by the time period of the series. He wrote two pieces, but the producers rejected them as they did not want to have modern-day music appear in-universe.

== Reception ==
James Hunt, in his review for the website Den of Geek, called the episode "alright", but criticised the lack of links between the two plots. He suggested that Okona was a Mary Sue as the episode revolves around his actions but added that he was pleased that there was a twist which was more complicated than Okona turning out to be evil. He also praised the entertainment seen in Brent Spiner's ability to "overact", saying that it "could fill an episode in itself" and that the observation that Data makes towards the end was the most profound of the series so far.

Keith DeCandido reviewed the episode for Tor.com, where he said that the "charm and talent" of Spiner and Campbell were what made this episode work. He added that Patrick Stewart warranted additional praise as his reactions of annoyance to the feuding families were "hilariously played". DeCandido gave "The Outrageous Okona" a rating of five out of ten. Zack Handlen of The A.V. Club described the episode as "lousy", calling it "goddamn painful" and any scene with Piscopo was "terrible". He gave the episode a rating of C−.

== Home media release ==
The episode was included on the Star Trek: The Next Generation season two DVD box set, released in on May 7, 2002. It was released as part of the season two Blu-ray set on December 4, 2012.
