= Michael Hayes (TV series) =

- Genre: Police procedural; Legal drama
- Created by: John Romano; Nicholas Pileggi
- Developed by: Paul Haggis
- Starring: David Caruso; Ruben Santiago-Hudson; Mary B. Ward; Jimmy Galeota; David Cubitt; Peter Outerbridge; Hillary Danner; Philip Baker Hall; Rebecca Rigg
- Theme music composer: Mark Isham
- Composer: Roger Neill
- Country of origin: United States
- Original language: English
- No. of seasons: 1
- No. of episodes: 22

Production
- Executive producers: Paul Haggis; Michael Pressman
- Running time: 60 minutes
- Production companies: Baumgarten-Prophet Entertainment; Trotwood Productions; New Regency Pictures; Columbia TriStar Television

Original release
- Network: CBS
- Release: September 15, 1997 – June 15, 1998

Michael Hayes is an American police legal drama television series that aired on CBS from September 15, 1997, to June 15, 1998. It stars David Caruso and Ruben Santiago-Hudson.

== Summary ==
David Caruso plays in the title role, an Irish Catholic ex-New York City police officer appointed acting United States Attorney for the Southern District of New York.

This series was Caruso's first attempt at a comeback on television after he left NYPD Blue.

== Cast ==
- David Caruso as Michael Hayes
- Ruben Santiago-Hudson as Eddie Diaz
- Mary B. Ward as Caitlin Hayes
- Jimmy Galeota as Daniel Hayes Jr.
- David Cubitt as Danny Hayes
- Peter Outerbridge as John Manning
- Hillary Danner as Jenny Nevins
- Philip Baker Hall as William Vaughn
- Rebecca Rigg as Lindsay Straus

== Episodes ==
No.	Title	Directed by	Written by	Original release date	Prod. code
1	"Prequel"	Peter Weller	Paul Haggis & John Romano	September 15, 1997	101
2	"Pilot"	Thomas Carter	Story by : Nicholas Pileggi & John Romano; Teleplay by : John Romano	September 23, 1997	100
3	"True Blue"	Fred Gerber	Barry Schindel & Paul Haggis	September 30, 1997	102
4	"The Doctor's Tale"	Peter Weller	Gardner Stern & John Romano	October 7, 1997	103
5	"Act of Contrition"	Felix Alcala	John Romano & Michael Harbert	October 14, 1997	104
6	"Heroes"	Fred Gerber	Paul Haggis & Anne Kenney	October 21, 1997	105
7	"Radio Killer"	Dennie Gordon	Michelle Ashford & John Romano (teleplay), Gallatin Warfield & Michelle Ashford (story)	October 28, 1997	106
8	"Death and Taxes"	Alex Graves	Richard Kletter & Gardner Stern	November 4, 1997	107
9	"Slaves"	Adam Nimoy	Anne Kenney & Paul Haggis	December 2, 1997	108
10	"The Confidence Man"	Dan Lerner	Barry M. Schkolnick & John Romano	December 9, 1997	109
11	"Retribution"	Fred Gerber	Gardner Stern	December 16, 1997	110
12	"Mob Mentality"	Allen Coulter	Anne Kenney	January 6, 1998	111
13	"Arise and Fall"	Richard J. Lewis	John Romano & Allan Steele	January 13, 1998	112
14	"Imagine: Part 1"	Michael Pressman	Michael Chernuchin	March 4, 1998	115
15	"Imagine: Part 2"	Mel Damski	Michael Chernuchin	March 11, 1998	116
16	"Under Color of Law"	Lou Antonio	Ray Hartung & John Romano (teleplay), Ray Hartung (story)	March 18, 1998	114
17	"Lawyers, Guns and Money"	Michael Schultz	Fred Golan	March 25, 1998	117
18	"Gotterdammerung"	Oz Scott	Michael Chernuchin & Barry M. Schkolnick	April 1, 1998	118
19	"Power Play"	Vahan Moosekian	Bonnie Mark	April 8, 1998	119
20	"Devotion"	Alex Graves	Richard Kletter & Gardner Stern	June 1, 1998	120
21	"Faith"	Michael Pressman	Michael Chernuchin & Barry M. Schkolnick	June 8, 1998	121
22	"Vaughn Mower"	Tim Hunter	Eugene Lee & Gardner Stern	June 15, 1998	113
