= The Art of Being Nick =

1987 American TV pilot

- Genre: Sitcom
- Created by: Bruce Helford
- Written by: Bruce Helford
- Directed by: Sam Weisman
- Starring: Scott Valentine; Kristine Sutherland; Julia Louis-Dreyfus
- Theme music composer: Rick Rhodes; Dominic Messinger
- Composers: Rick Rhodes; Dominic Messinger
- Country of origin: United States
- Original language: English
- No. of seasons: 1

Production
- Executive producer: Bruce Helford
- Cinematography: George LaFountaine
- Running time: 24 minutes
- Production companies: Ubu Productions, in association with Paramount Network Television

Original release
- Network: NBC
- Release: August 27, 1987

Related
- Family Ties (1982–1989)

The Art of Being Nick is an American sitcom pilot created by Bruce Helford, that aired on NBC as a special on August 27, 1987. The pilot stars Scott Valentine as environmental artist Nick Moore, who appeared as Mallory Keaton's (Justine Bateman) boyfriend in Family Ties. Also in the cast were Kristine Sutherland, Julia Louis-Dreyfus, and John Daman.

== Overview ==
Due to the popularity of the Nick Moore character, three versions of a spin-off were produced. In the first incarnation titled Taking It Home, Nick returns to Detroit to live with his sister and grandfather (portrayed by Herschel Bernardi). After Bernardi's death in May 1986, the pilot was not picked to series. The second version features Nick working in a day care center for juvenile delinquents.

In the final version, Nick, his sister (Kristine Sutherland) and her son (John Daman) live together in an East Village apartment with Nick working in a bookstore.

The Art of Being Nick aired on August 27, 1987. Despite garnering solid ratings, NBC didn't pick the series up reportedly due to the network's reluctance to lose the popular Nick character from Family Ties.

== Cast ==
- Scott Valentine as Nick Moore
- Kristine Sutherland as Marlene Moore
- Julia Louis-Dreyfus as Rachel
- John Daman as Louis
- Ray Buktenica as Bob
