= The Best of Walt Disney's True-Life Adventures =

1975 film

- Theatrical release poster
- Directed by: James Algar
- Written by: James Algar; Winston Hibler; Ted Sears
- Produced by: Ben Sharpsteen; James Algar
- Narrated by: Winston Hibler
- Cinematography: Alfred G. Milotte; Elma Milotte; N. Paul Kenworthy; Robert H. Crandall; Hugh A. Wilmar; James R. Simon; Herb and Lois Crisler; Tom McHugh; Jack C. Couffer
- Edited by: Norman Palmer; Lloyd L. Richardson; Anthony Gerard; Gregg McLaughlin; Gordon Brenner
- Music by: Paul Smith; Oliver Wallace; Buddy Baker
- Production company: Walt Disney Productions
- Distributed by: Buena Vista Distribution
- Release date: October 8, 1975
- Running time: 89 minutes
- Country: United States
- Language: English

The Best of Walt Disney's True-Life Adventures is an American compilation documentary film produced by Walt Disney Productions, directed by James Algar and released by Buena Vista Distribution on October 8, 1975. The film is composed of highlights from the Academy Award winning True-Life Adventures series of 13 feature length and short subject nature documentary films produced between 1948 and 1960.

== Synopsis ==
The film opens with a salute to Walt Disney, a pioneer of nature films and animal lover, followed by a compilation of excerpted segments from the True-Life Adventures film series showcasing animals of all kinds depicted in dramatic, fascinating moments of habitats from the American prairie to the North American desert, to Africa, the Amazon jungle and to the Arctic.

== Featured documentary films ==
- Seal Island (1948)
- In Beaver Valley (1950)
- Nature's Half Acre (1951)
- The Olympic Elk (1952)
- Water Birds (1952)
- Bear Country (1953)
- Prowlers of the Everglades (1953)
- The Living Desert (1953)
- The Vanishing Prairie (1954)
- The African Lion (1955)
- Secrets of Life (1956)
- White Wilderness (1958)
- Jungle Cat (1960)

== Home media ==
The Best of Walt Disney's True-Life Adventures was released only on VHS in the United Kingdom in the 1980s. To date, it has never been released on any physical format in the United States by Walt Disney Studios Home Entertainment. The film is available as a digital download on Amazon Video, YouTube, Disney Movies Anywhere and iTunes.

== See also ==
- List of American films of 1975
- True-Life Adventures
- List of Disney live-action shorts
- List of Walt Disney Pictures films
