= List of Academy Awards for Walt Disney =

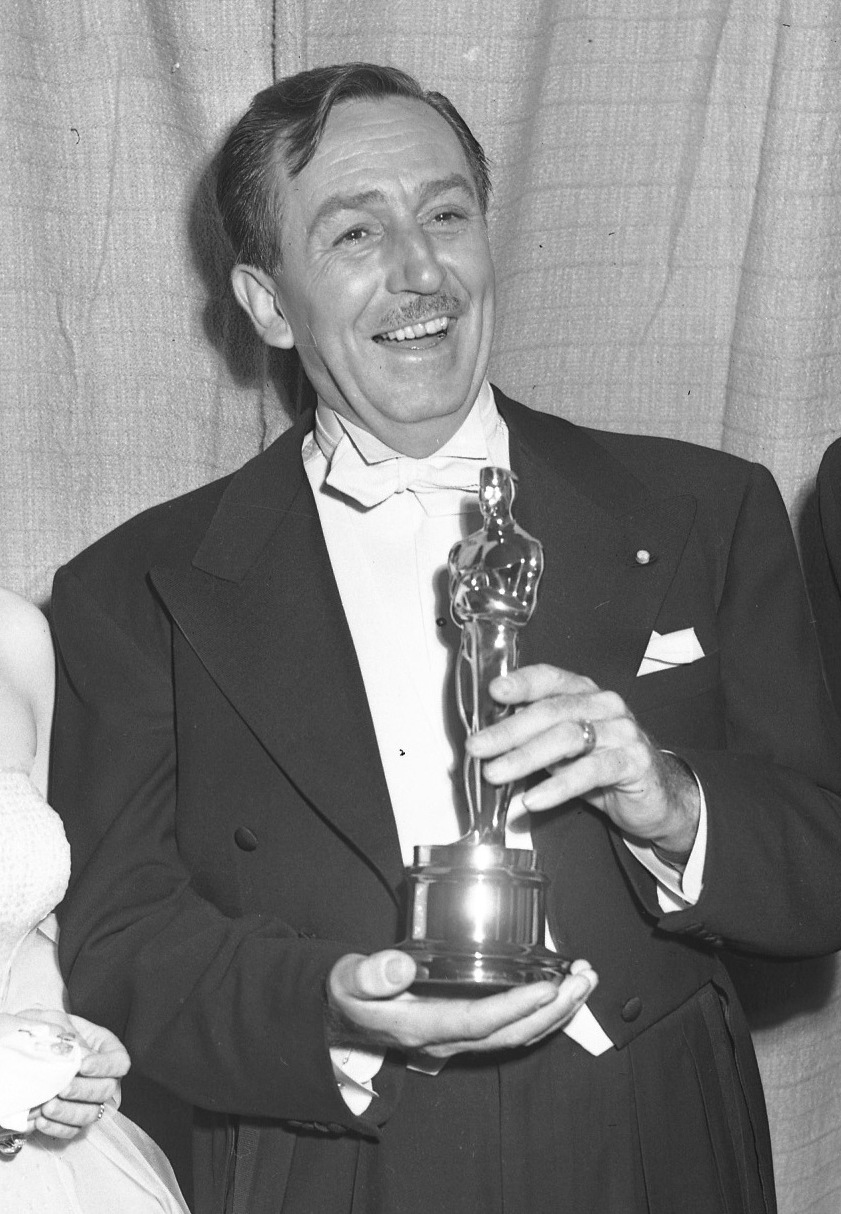
Cartoonist and film producer Walt Disney in 1953, winning the Academy Award for Best Live Action Short Film for Water Birds

Walt Disney (1901–1966) won or received a total of twenty-six Academy Awards and holds the record for most Academy Awards in history. He won twenty-two competitive Academy Awards from a total of fifty-nine nominations, and also holds the records for most wins and most nominations for an individual in history.

Disney won his first competitive Academy Award and received his first Honorary Academy Award at the 5th Academy Awards (1932). He received the Honorary Academy Award for the creation of Mickey Mouse and won the Academy Award for Best Short Subject (Cartoon) for the film Flowers and Trees. In the seven Academy Award ceremonies that followed (6th–12th), Disney consecutively earned nominations and won in the same category.

Disney received three more Honorary Academy Awards, one in 1939 and two in 1942. At the 26th Academy Awards (1954), Disney won the Academy Award in all four categories in which he was nominated: Best Short Subject (Cartoon), Best Short Subject (Two-reel), Best Documentary (Feature), and Best Documentary (Short Subject). In 1965, Disney earned his sole Best Picture nomination, for the film Mary Poppins. He was posthumously awarded his final Academy Award in 1969 for Winnie the Pooh and the Blustery Day.

== Competitive Academy Awards ==
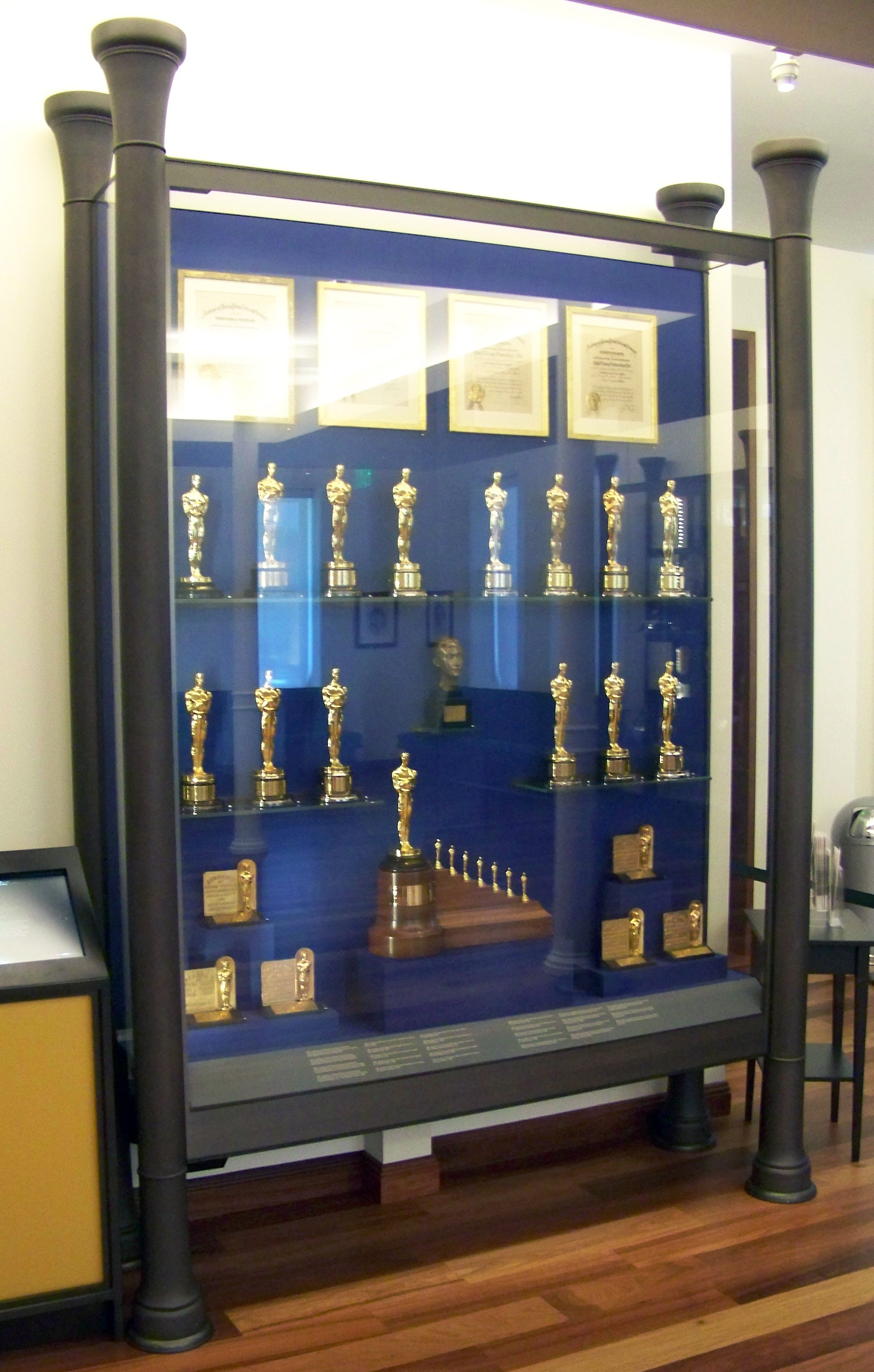
The display case in the lobby of the Walt Disney Family Museum, in San Francisco, displays many of the Academy Awards that Walt Disney won or received. The distinctive, special award which he received for Snow White and the Seven Dwarfs, is at the bottom.

Year	Category	Film/documentary	Result	Refs.
1932 (5th)	Best Short Subject (Cartoon)	Flowers and Trees	Won	
1932 (5th)	Best Short Subject (Cartoon)	Mickey's Orphans	Nominated	
1933 (6th)	Best Short Subject (Cartoon)	Three Little Pigs	Won	
1933 (6th)	Best Short Subject (Cartoon)	Building a Building	Nominated	
1934 (7th)	Best Short Subject (Cartoon)	The Tortoise and the Hare	Won	
1935 (8th)	Best Short Subject (Cartoon)	Three Orphan Kittens	Won	
1935 (8th)	Best Short Subject (Cartoon)	Who Killed Cock Robin?	Nominated	
1936 (9th)	Best Short Subject (Cartoon)	The Country Cousin	Won	
1937 (10th)	Best Short Subject (Cartoon)	The Old Mill	Won	
1938 (11th)	Best Short Subject (Cartoon)	Ferdinand the Bull	Won	
1938 (11th)	Best Short Subject (Cartoon)	Brave Little Tailor	Nominated	
1938 (11th)	Best Short Subject (Cartoon)	Good Scouts	Nominated	
1938 (11th)	Best Short Subject (Cartoon)	Mother Goose Goes Hollywood	Nominated	
1939 (12th)	Best Short Subject (Cartoon)	The Ugly Duckling	Won	
1939 (12th)	Best Short Subject (Cartoon)	The Pointer	Nominated	
1941 (14th)	Best Short Subject (Cartoon)	Lend a Paw	Won	
1941 (14th)	Best Short Subject (Cartoon)	Truant Officer Donald	Nominated	
1942 (15th)	Best Short Subject (Cartoon)	Der Fuehrer's Face	Won	
1942 (15th)	Best Documentary	The Grain That Built a Hemisphere	Nominated	
1942 (15th)	Best Documentary	The New Spirit	Nominated	
1943 (16th)	Best Short Subject (Cartoon)	Reason and Emotion	Nominated	
1944 (17th)	Best Short Subject (Cartoon)	How to Play Football	Nominated	
1945 (18th)	Best Short Subject (Cartoon)	Donald's Crime	Nominated	
1946 (19th)	Best Short Subject (Cartoon)	Squatter's Rights	Nominated	
1947 (20th)	Best Short Subject (Cartoon)	Chip an' Dale	Nominated	
1947 (20th)	Best Short Subject (Cartoon)	Pluto's Blue Note	Nominated	
1948 (21st)	Best Short Subject (Two-reel)	Seal Island	Won	
1948 (21st)	Best Short Subject (Cartoon)	Mickey and the Seal	Nominated	
1948 (21st)	Best Short Subject (Cartoon)	Tea for Two Hundred	Nominated	
1949 (22nd)	Best Short Subject (Cartoon)	Toy Tinkers	Nominated	
1950 (23rd)	Best Short Subject (Two-reel)	In Beaver Valley	Won	
1951 (24th)	Best Short Subject (Two-reel)	Nature's Half Acre	Won	
1951 (24th)	Best Short Subject (Cartoon)	Lambert the Sheepish Lion	Nominated	
1952 (25th)	Best Short Subject (Live Action)	Water Birds	Won	
1953 (26th)	Best Documentary (Feature)	The Living Desert	Won	
1953 (26th)	Best Documentary (Short Subject)	The Alaskan Eskimo	Won	
1953 (26th)	Best Short Subject (Cartoon)	Toot, Whistle, Plunk and Boom	Won	
1953 (26th)	Best Short Subject (Cartoon)	Rugged Bear	Nominated	
1953 (26th)	Best Short Subject (Two-reel)	Bear Country	Won	
1953 (26th)	Best Short Subject (Two-reel)	Ben and Me	Nominated	
1954 (27th)	Best Documentary (Feature)	The Vanishing Prairie	Won	
1954 (27th)	Best Short Subject (Cartoon)	Pigs Is Pigs	Nominated	
1954 (27th)	Best Short Subject (Two-reel)	Siam	Nominated	
1955 (28th)	Best Documentary (Short Subject)	Men Against the Arctic	Won	
1955 (28th)	Best Short Subject (Cartoon)	No Hunting	Nominated	
1955 (28th)	Best Short Subject (Two-reel)	Switzerland	Nominated	
1956 (29th)	Best Short Subject (Two-reel)	Samoa	Nominated	
1957 (30th)	Best Short Subject (Cartoon)	The Truth About Mother Goose	Nominated	
1958 (31st)	Best Short Subject (Live Action)	Grand Canyon	Won	
1958 (31st)	Best Short Subject (Cartoon)	Paul Bunyan	Nominated	
1959 (32nd)	Best Documentary (Short Subject)	Donald in Mathmagic Land	Nominated	
1959 (32nd)	Best Short Subject (Cartoon)	Noah's Ark	Nominated	
1959 (32nd)	Best Short Subject (Live Action)	Mysteries of the Deep	Nominated	
1960 (33rd)	Best Short Subject (Cartoon)	Goliath II	Nominated	
1960 (33rd)	Best Short Subject (Live Action)	Islands of the Sea	Nominated	
1961 (34th)	Best Short Subject (Cartoon)	Aquamania	Nominated	
1962 (35th)	Best Short Subject (Cartoon)	Symposium on Popular Songs	Nominated	
1964 (37th)	Best Picture	Mary Poppins	Nominated	
1968 (41st)	Best Short Subject (Cartoon)	Winnie the Pooh and the Blustery Day	Won (posthumous win)	≠

=== Footnotes ===
- ≠ indicates the award was accepted by someone else (in this case, the winning film's director Wolfgang Reitherman)

== Honorary Academy Awards ==
Honorary Academy Awards
Year	To, for/award name	Award type	Refs.
1932 (5th)	To Walt Disney for the creation of Mickey Mouse.	Statuette	
1939 (11th)	To Walt Disney for Snow White and the Seven Dwarfs, "recognized as a significant screen innovation which has charmed millions and pioneered a great new entertainment field for the motion picture cartoon."	One statuette and seven miniature statuettes on a stepped base	
1942 (14th)	To Walt Disney, William Garity, John N. A. Hawkins and the RCA Manufacturing Company "for their outstanding contribution to the advancement of the use of sound in motion pictures through the production of Fantasia."	Certificate of merit	
1942 (14th)	Irving G. Thalberg Memorial Award	Thalberg Award	

== See also ==
- List of Academy Award records
- List of people who have won multiple Academy Awards in a single year
- List of posthumous Academy Award winners and nominees
