= Joshua Meador =

American animator, special effects artist and animation director

Joshua Lawrence "Josh" Meador (March 12, 1911 - August 24, 1965) was an American animator, effects animator, special effects artist, and animation director for the Walt Disney studios.

== Biography ==
Meador was born in Greenwood, Mississippi. His family later moved to Columbus, Mississippi in 1918. He later studied at the Chicago Art Institute. There, a fellow alumnus told Meador he was traveling to California to be interviewed at Walt Disney Productions, and suggested for him to come along. At first, Meador refused as he wanted to do commercial art, but he was coerced into interviewing at Disney. There, he was hired to work in their animation effects department, where he worked on numerous films such as 20,000 Leagues Under the Sea, for which the studio won an Academy Award. Meador also created the animation effects for the 1956 MGM science-fiction film Forbidden Planet, most notably the "Monster from the Id" that attacks the spaceship.

Privately, Meador described himself as "first and foremost a painter", in which he painted more than 2,000 canvases and impressionistic landscape and seascape paintings. He frequently appeared and was acknowledged by host Disney in the live-action color shorts produced for the studio's behind-the-scenes documentaries during the 1950s, becoming unofficially the 10th member of Disney's Nine Old Men (Tricks of Our Trade, 4 Artists Paint 1 Tree).

During his lifetime many of his works were displayed in museums or held in private collections, and President Lyndon B. Johnson was presented with a painting of his by the Democratic Party.

In August 1965, Meador suffered a heart attack and died at his residence in Casper, California. He is buried at Friendship Cemetery in Columbus, Mississippi, which was also his hometown. There is a historical marker at his childhood home.

== Filmography ==
Year	Title	Credits	Notes
1937	Snow White and the Seven Dwarfs	Animator	
1940	Pinocchio	Animator	
1940	Fantasia	Animator - Segment "Toccata and Fugue in D Minor" / Animation Supervisor - Segment "Rite of Spring" / Special Animation Effects - Segment "Night on Bald Mountain/Ave Maria"	
1941	The Reluctant Dragon	Special Effects	Credited and Known as Joshua L. Meador
1941	Dumbo	Animator	Credited and Known as Josh Meador
1942	Bambi	Animator	
1943	Saludos Amigos (Short)	Animator	Credited and Known as Josh Meador
1943	Victory Through Air Power (Documentary)	Animator	Credited and Known as Josh Meador
1945	The Clock Watcher (Short)	Animator	Credited and Known as Josh Meador
1945	The Three Caballeros	Special Effects Animator	Credited and Known as Josh Meador
1945	Donald's Crime (Short)	Animator	
1945	Old Sequoia (Short)	Animator	Credited and Known as Josh Meador
1946	Make Mine Music	Director	Credited and Known as Josh Meador
1946	Song of the South	Effects Animator	Credited and Known as Josh Meador
1948	Melody Time	Effects Animator	Credited and Known as Josh Meador
1948	Soup's On (Short)	Animator	
1949	So Dear to My Heart	Effects Animator	Credited and Known as Josh Meador
1950	Pluto and the Gopher (Short)	Effects Animator	
1950	Cinderella	Effects Animator	Credited and Known as Josh Meador
1951	Alice in Wonderland	Effects Animator	Credited and Known as Josh Meador
1951	Nature's Half Acre (Documentary short)	Animation Effects	
1952	Water Birds (Documentary short)	Animation Effects	Credited and Known as Josh Meador
1953	Bear Country (Documentary short)	Animation Effects	
1953	Peter Pan	Effects Animator	
1953	The Alaskan Eskimo (Documentary short)	Animator	
1953	Prowlers of the Everglades (Documentary short)	Animation Effects	Credited and Known as Josh Meador
1953	The Living Desert (Documentary)	Animation	
1954	The Vanishing Prairie (Documentary)	Animation Effects	
1954	20,000 Leagues Under the Sea	Special Effects	Credited and Known as Josh Meador
1955	Davy Crockett, King of the Wild Frontier	Special Art Work	
1955	The African Lion (Documentary)	Animation Effects	
1955	Men Against the Arctic (Documentary short)	Animation Effects	
1956	Forbidden Planet	Special Effects: Through Courtesy of Walt Disney Productions	
1956	Secrets of Life (Documentary)	Animation Effects	
1957	Perri	Special Effects	
1958	4 Artists Paint 1 Tree: A Walt Disney 'Adventure in Art' (Documentary short)	Himself - Artist	Credited and Known as Josh Meador
1958	White Wilderness (Documentary)	Animation Effects	
1959	Sleeping Beauty	Effects Animator	
1959	Nature's Strangest Creatures (Short documentary)	Animation Effects	
1959	Donald in Mathmagic Land (Short)	Sequence Director	
1959	Darby O'Gill and the Little People	Animation Effects	
1959	Mysteries of the Deep (Documentary short)	Animation Effects	
1960	Islands of the Sea (Documentary short)	Animation Effects	
1960	Jungle Cat (Documentary)	Animation Effects	
1961	The Absent-Minded Professor	Special Effects	
1961	Donald and the Wheel (Short)	Effects Animator	
1961	Babes in Toyland	Animation Effects	
1964	The Restless Sea (TV Movie Documentary)	Animator	
1980	Mickey Mouse Disco (Short)	Animator	Credited and Known as Josh Meador
2002	Mickey's House of Villains (Video)	Animator - Segment "Donald Duck and the Gorilla"	Credited and Known as Josh Meador
