= Edward H. Plumb =

American film score composer (1907–1958)

Edward Holcomb Plumb (June 6, 1907 – April 18, 1958) was an American film composer and orchestrator best known for his work at Walt Disney Studios. He served as musical director of Fantasia and orchestrated and co-composed the score for Bambi, and orchestrated and expanded the film's main composer Frank Churchill's menacing but simple three-note Man theme.

== Early life ==
Plumb was born on June 6, 1907 in Streator, Illinois. His grandfather, Colonel Ralph Plumb founded the city of Streator in 1866. He had attended Dartmouth College even alongside Theodor Geisel, otherwise known as Dr. Seuss, the two of them remained friends for decades afterward. Upon graduation in 1929, Plumb received a fellowship to have his musical education at the University of Vienna and had private compositional lessons with Joseph Marx.

He came to Hollywood during the 1930’s freelancing for band leaders such as Paul Whiteman, Vincent Lopez, Johnny Green, Andre Kostelanetz. and Rudy Vallee.

Plumb was hired by Disney on March 15, 1937.

== Career ==
In the 1930s, Plumb moved to California and began work as a composer and orchestrator in the film industry. In addition to his work for Disney, Plumb frequently worked on titles for other studios, including Republic, Paramount and 20th Century Fox. In 1953, he wrote the music for MGM's Tom and Jerry short called The Missing Mouse because Scott Bradley was on vacation. Back at Disney, Plumb orchestrated the music for Snow White and the Seven Dwarfs, the Whale Chase sequence in Pinocchio, Dumbo, Make Mine Music, Song of the South, Beanero in Fun and Fancy Free, So Dear to My Heart, some subsidiary cues for Cinderella, Peter Pan, and Lady and the Tramp. He also orchestrated a number of television programs for Walt Disney Presents, a number of Davy Crockett films and on Westward Ho, the Wagons!, starring Fess Parker. His final film project was Johnny Tremain for Disney in 1957.

He received Oscar nominations for Bambi, Victory Through Air Power, Saludos Amigos and The Three Caballeros.

In the Tom and Jerry cartoon "The Missing Mouse" he is credited as "Edward Plumb" without the H. initial.

== Death ==
Plumb died on April 18, 1958 in Los Angeles, California. He was 50.

== Disney credits ==
- 1937 Snow White and the Seven Dwarfs - orchestration - uncredited
- 1938 Mother Goose Goes Hollywood - score
- 1940 Pinocchio - additional music - uncredited
- 1940 Fantasia - musical director
- 1941 The Reluctant Dragon - orchestration - uncredited
- 1941 Dumbo - orchestration
- 1942 Bambi - music by
- 1942 Saludos Amigos - score
- 1943 Victory Through Air Power - score
- 1944 The Three Caballeros - associate music director
- 1945 Donald's Crime - score
- 1946 Make Mine Music - associate music director
- 1946 Song of the South - orchestration
- 1947 Fun and Fancy Free - orchestration - uncredited
- 1949 So Dear to My Heart - orchestration as Ed Plumb
- 1950 Cinderella - orchestration - uncredited
- 1950 In Beaver Valley - orchestration - uncredited
- 1951 Nature's Half Acre - orchestration - uncredited
- 1952 The Olympic Elk - orchestration - uncredited
- 1952 Water Birds - orchestration
- 1953 Peter Pan - orchestration
- 1953 Bear Country - orchestration - uncredited
- 1953 The Alaskan Eskimo - orchestration - uncredited
- 1953 The New Neighbor - score
- 1953 The Living Desert - orchestration
- 1953 How to Sleep - score
- 1954 Donald's Diary - score
- 1954 The Vanishing Prairie - orchestration
- 1955 Davy Crockett: King of the Wild Frontier - orchestration
- 1955 Lady and the Tramp - orchestration
- 1956 Davy Crockett and the River Pirates - orchestration
- 1956 Secrets of Life - orchestration
- 1956 Westward Ho the Wagons! - orchestration
- 1957 Johnny Tremain - orchestration (final film)

== Works outside of the Disney Studio ==
- 1942 Iceland - orchestrator
- 1942 Careful, Soft Shoulders - orchestrator
- 1942 Girl Trouble - orchestrator
- 1942 You Were Never Lovelier - orchestrator
- 1944 Ever Since Venus
- 1944 Something for the Boys - orchestration
- 1945 The Phantom Speaks - score
- 1945 The Woman Who Came Back - score
- 1945 Doll Face - orchestrator
- 1946 Murder in the Music Hall - additional music - uncredited
- 1946 Valley of the Zombies
- 1946 Centennial Summer
- 1946 Monsieur Beaucaire
- 1946 Wake Up and Dream
- 1947 Calcutta - orchestrator
- 1947 Variety Girl - composer "Puppetoon" sequence
- 1948 The Sainted Sisters - orchestrator
- 1949 The Accused - orchestrator
- 1949 The Great Lover - orchestrator
- 1950 The Happy Years - orchestrator
- 1950 Fancy Pants - orchestrator
- 1950 Father Is a Bachelor
- 1951 Quebec
- 1951 The Painted Hills - orchestrator
- 1951 That's My Boy - orchestrator
- 1951 Angels in the Outfield - orchestrator
- 1953 The Missing Mouse
