= Norman R. Palmer =

American television editor

Norman Palmer
- Born: October 7, 1918; Santa Ana, California, U.S.
- Died: March 23, 2013 (aged 94); Los Angeles, California, U.S.
- Occupations: Staff projectionist; Film editor
- Years active: 1938–1983
- Spouse: Barbara Major (m. 1947)
- Children: 3

Norman "Stormy" Palmer (October 7, 1918 – March 23, 2013) was an American film editor for The Walt Disney Company. He worked for Disney for around 45 years and served as a mentor to Roy E. Disney, who was later appointed vice-chairman of Disney productions. Palmer was best known for his work on the True-Life Adventures series, and in 1998 he was named a Disney Legend.

== Biography ==
Palmer was a fourth-generation Californian born in Santa Ana on October 7, 1918. His father had given him the nickname "Stormy" at a young age for reasons he didn't recall. Palmer graduated from Hollywood High School in 1937 and submitted an application to Walt Disney Studios before heading to Oregon to work on a ranch and ride horses. The following year he received a phone call informing him that Disney wanted to hire him, and shortly after he joined as a staff projectionist. Six months later, Palmer moved into the Editorial department and assisted on films such as Pinocchio and Fantasia.

During World War II, Palmer worked alongside director John Ford in the photographic unit of the Office of Strategic Services. There, he edited films for the Joint Chiefs of Staff in Washington, D.C. Later, Palmer was transferred overseas and served an overseas stint as an aerial photographer on surveillance missions. He took surveillance photos of England, France, and Italy. Palmer returned to Disney after the war in 1946, where he met Barbara Major, who worked in the Ink and Paint Department. The two fell in love and married on December 4, 1947.

Palmer began editing for the True-Life Adventures series with In Beaver Valley, Nature's Half Acre, and Water Birds. In 1953, he received his first feature credit on The Living Desert. Palmer continued to edit for the True-Life Adventure series, including The African Lion and White Wilderness. Palmer also edited the 1959 Oscar winning short documentary Grand Canyon.

When Disney expanded into television, Palmer worked on numerous episodes of their long-running anthology series Walt Disney's Disneyland (also known as Walt Disney's Wonderful World of Color and The Wonderful World of Disney). Other television shows and feature films Palmer worked on include Atta Girl, Kelly!, The Legend of Lobo, My Dog, the Thief, Adventure in Satan's Canyon, and The Shaggy D.A.

After working for 45 years, Palmer retired from The Walt Disney Studios in 1983, reportedly devoting his leisure time to sailing, golfing, and woodworking. Five years later, he was named a Disney Legend. Sometime in 2005, Barbara died after 52 years of marriage. Later, in 2012, Palmer's daughter, Laurie Palmer, died as well. Stormy would live in Northridge, California, until he died of natural causes on March 23, 2013. He is survived by his daughters Christine Thomson and Lindsey Palmer, as well as his two grandchildren Amanda and Colin Sebern.
