= List of people who have won multiple Academy Awards in a single year =

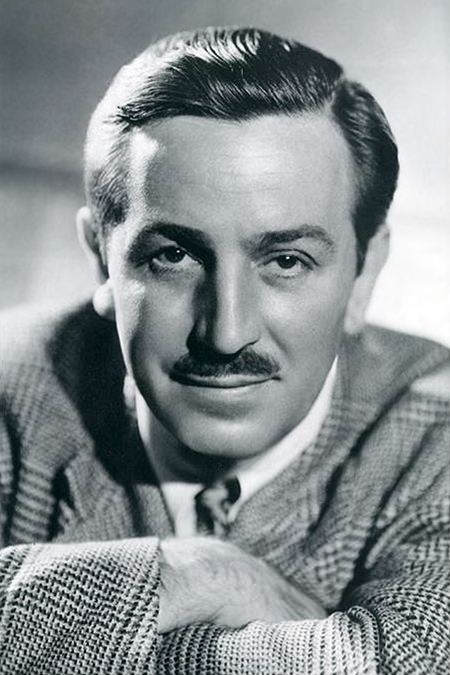
Walt Disney won four awards for separate films in 1954.

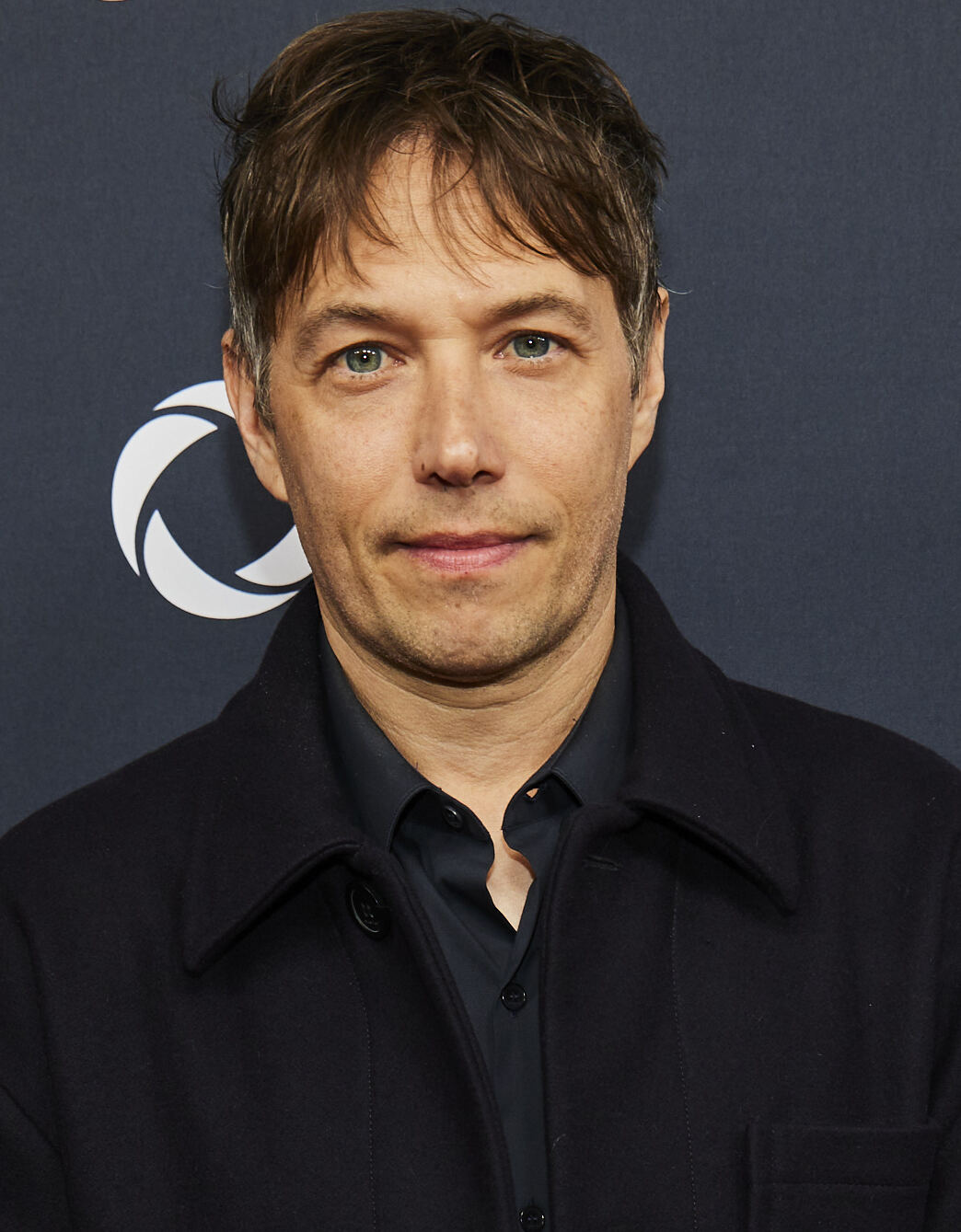
Sean Baker won four awards for a single film in 2025.

This is a list of people have won multiple Academy Awards in a single year in the standard competitive categories.

To date, 84 individuals have achieved this feat on 97 occasions. The record for most awards in a single year is shared by Walt Disney, who won four Academy Awards for four films in 1954, and Sean Baker, who won four Academy Awards for Anora in 2025. Ten individuals have won multiple Oscars more than once.

This list is current as of the 97th Academy Awards ceremony held on March 2, 2025.

== List of winners ==
Name	Number	Ceremony	Year	Films	Academy Awards
Sean Baker	4	97th	2024	Anora	Best Picture, Best Director, Best Original Screenplay, Best Film Editing
Walt Disney	4	26th	1953	The Living Desert; The Alaskan Eskimo; Toot, Whistle, Plunk and Boom; Bear Country	Best Documentary (Feature); Best Documentary (Short Subject); Best Short Subject (Cartoon); Best Short Subject (Two-Reel)
Paul Thomas Anderson	3	98th	2025	One Battle After Another	Best Picture, Best Director, Best Adapted Screenplay
Bong Joon-Ho	3 (Note: The win by Parasite for Best International Feature Film does not count toward Bong Joon-Ho's total. Rules for the 92nd Academy Awards stated: "The Academy statuette (Oscar) will be awarded to the film and accepted by the director on behalf of the film's creative talents. For Academy Awards purposes, the country will be credited as the nominee. The director's name will be listed on the statuette plaque after the country and film title." "92nd Academy Awards of Merit Rules & Eligibility" (PDF). Academy of Motion Picture Arts and Sciences. 2019. Archived (PDF) from the original on April 24, 2019.)	92nd	2019	Parasite	Best Picture, Best Director, Best Original Screenplay
James L. Brooks	3	56th	1983	Terms of Endearment	Best Picture, Best Director, Best Adapted Screenplay
James Cameron	3	70th	1997	Titanic	Best Picture, Best Director, Best Film Editing
Ethan Coen	3	80th	2007	No Country for Old Men	Best Picture, Best Director, Best Adapted Screenplay
Joel Coen	3	80th	2007	No Country for Old Men	Best Picture, Best Director, Best Adapted Screenplay
Francis Ford Coppola	3	47th	1974	The Godfather Part II	Best Picture, Best Director, Best Adapted Screenplay
Marvin Hamlisch	3	46th	1973	The Way We Were; The Sting	Best Original Score, Best Original Song; Best Original Song Score and Its Adaptation or Adaptation Score
Alejandro González Iñárritu	3	87th	2014	Birdman or (The Unexpected Virtue of Ignorance)	Best Picture, Best Director, Best Original Screenplay
Peter Jackson	3	76th	2003	The Lord of the Rings: The Return of the King	Best Picture, Best Director, Best Adapted Screenplay
Fran Walsh	3	76th	2003	The Lord of the Rings: The Return of the King	Best Picture, Best Adapted Screenplay, Best Original Song
Daniel Kwan	3	95th	2022	Everything Everywhere All At Once	Best Picture, Best Director, Best Original Screenplay
Daniel Scheinert	3	95th	2022	Everything Everywhere All At Once	Best Picture, Best Director, Best Original Screenplay
Billy Wilder	3	33rd	1960	The Apartment	Best Picture, Best Director, Best Original Screenplay
Woody Allen	2	50th	1977	Annie Hall	Best Director, Best Original Screenplay
Robert Amram	2	44th	1971	Sentinels of Silence	Best Live Action Short, Best Documentary Short
Manuel Arango	2	44th	1971	Sentinels of Silence	Best Live Action Short, Best Documentary Short
Richard Attenborough	2	55th	1982	Gandhi	Best Picture, Best Director
Burt Bacharach	2	42nd	1969	Butch Cassidy and the Sundance Kid	Best Original Score, Best Original Song
John Barry	2	39th	1966	Born Free	Best Original Score, Best Original Song
Cecil Beaton	2	37th	1964	My Fair Lady	Best Art Direction (color), Best Costume Design (color)
Robert Benton	2	52nd	1979	Kramer vs. Kramer	Best Director, Best Adapted Screenplay
Bernardo Bertolucci	2	60th	1987	The Last Emperor	Best Director, Best Adapted Screenplay
Kathryn Bigelow	2	82nd	2009	The Hurt Locker	Best Picture, Best Director
Mark Boal	2	82nd	2009	The Hurt Locker	Best Picture, Best Original Screenplay
Michael Cimino	2	51st	1978	The Deer Hunter	Best Picture, Best Director
Pierre Collings	2	9th	1936	The Story of Louis Pasteur	Best Original Story, Best Screenplay
Sam Comer	2	23rd	1950	Sunset Boulevard; Samson and Delilah	Best Art Direction (black & white); Best Art Direction (color)
Kevin Costner	2	63rd	1990	Dances with Wolves	Best Picture, Best Director
Alfonso Cuarón	2	86th	2013	Gravity	Best Director, Best Film Editing
Alfonso Cuarón	2 (Note: The win by Roma for Best Foreign Language Film does not count toward Alfonso Cuarón's total. Rules for the 91st Academy Awards stated: "The Academy statuette (Oscar) will be awarded to the motion picture and accepted by the director on behalf of the picture's creative talents. For Academy Awards purposes, the country will be credited as the nominee. The director's name will be listed on the statuette plaque after the country and film title." "91st Academy Awards of Merit Rules & Eligibility" (PDF). Academy of Motion Picture Arts and Sciences. 2018. Archived (PDF) from the original on May 1, 2018.)	91st	2018	Roma	Best Director, Best Cinematography
Richard Day	2	15th	1942	This Above All; My Gal Sal	Best Art Direction (black & white); Best Art Direction (color)
Guillermo del Toro	2	90th	2017	The Shape of Water	Best Picture, Best Director
Hans Dreier	2	23rd	1950	Sunset Boulevard; Samson and Delilah	Best Art Direction (black & white); Best Art Direction (color)
Clint Eastwood	2	65th	1992	Unforgiven	Best Picture, Best Director
Clint Eastwood	2	77th	2004	Million Dollar Baby	Best Picture, Best Director
Brian Currie	2	91st	2018	Green Book	Best Picture, Best Original Screenplay
Peter Farrelly	2	91st	2018	Green Book	Best Picture, Best Original Screenplay
Nick Vallelonga	2	91st	2018	Green Book	Best Picture, Best Original Screenplay
Roger K. Furse	2	21st	1948	Hamlet	Best Art Direction (black & white), Best Costume Design (black & white)
Sheridan Gibney	2	9th	1936	The Story of Louis Pasteur	Best Original Story, Best Screenplay
Mel Gibson	2	68th	1995	Braveheart	Best Picture, Best Director
Michael Gore	2	53rd	1980	Fame	Best Original Score, Best Original Song
Paul Haggis	2	78th	2005	Crash	Best Picture, Best Original Screenplay
Leigh Harline	2	13th	1940	Pinocchio	Best Original Score, Best Original Song
Edith Head	2	23rd	1950	All About Eve; Samson and Delilah	Best Costume Design (black & white); Best Costume Design (color)
Gordon Hollingshead	2	18th	1945	Hitler Lives?; Star in the Night	Best Documentary (Short Subject); Best Short Subject (Two-Reel)
Gordon Hollingshead	2	19th	1946	Facing Your Danger; A Boy and His Dog	Best Short Subject (One-Reel); Best Short Subject (Two-Reel)
James Horner	2	70th	1997	Titanic	Best Original Score, Best Original Song
Ron Howard	2	74th	2001	A Beautiful Mind	Best Picture, Best Director
Justin Hurwitz	2	89th	2016	La La Land	Best Original Score, Best Original Song
John Huston	2	21st	1948	The Treasure of the Sierra Madre	Best Director, Best Screenplay
Alan Jay Lerner	2	31st	1958	Gigi	Best Adapted Screenplay, Best Original Song
Thomas Little	2	15th	1942	This Above All; My Gal Sal	Best Art Direction (black & white); Best Art Direction (color)
Henry Mancini	2	34th	1961	Breakfast at Tiffany's	Best Original Score, Best Original Song
Joseph L. Mankiewicz	2	22nd	1949	A Letter to Three Wives	Best Director, Best Adapted Screenplay
Joseph L. Mankiewicz	2	23rd	1950	All About Eve	Best Director, Best Adapted Screenplay
Catherine Martin	2	74th	2001	Moulin Rouge!	Best Production Design, Best Costume Design
Catherine Martin	2	86th	2013	The Great Gatsby	Best Production Design, Best Costume Design
Leo McCarey	2	17th	1944	Going My Way	Best Director, Best Original Story
Chloé Zhao	2	93rd	2020/2021	Nomadland	Best Picture, Best Director
Frances McDormand	2	93rd	2020/2021	Nomadland	Best Picture, Best Actress
Alan Menken	2	62nd	1989	The Little Mermaid	Best Original Score, Best Original Song
Alan Menken	2	64th	1991	Beauty and the Beast	Best Original Score, Best Original Song
Alan Menken	2	65th	1992	Aladdin	Best Original Score, Best Original Song
Alan Menken	2	68th	1995	Pocahontas	Best Original Score, Best Original Song
Ray Moyer	2	23rd	1950	Sunset Boulevard; Samson and Delilah	Best Art Direction (black & white); Best Art Direction (color)
Walter Murch	2	69th	1996	The English Patient	Best Film Editing, Best Sound
Christopher Nolan	2	96th	2023	Oppenheimer	Best Picture, Best Director
Marc Norman	2	71st	1998	Shakespeare in Love	Best Picture, Best Original Screenplay
Paul N. J. Ottosson	2	82nd	2009	The Hurt Locker	Best Sound Mixing, Best Sound Editing
Sydney Pollack	2	58th	1985	Out of Africa	Best Picture, Best Director
A. R. Rahman	2	81st	2008	Slumdog Millionaire	Best Original Score, Best Original Song
Tony Richardson	2	36th	1963	Tom Jones	Best Picture, Best Director
Gary Rydstrom	2	64th	1991	Terminator 2: Judgment Day	Best Sound, Best Sound Effects Editing
Gary Rydstrom	2	66th	1993	Jurassic Park	Best Sound, Best Sound Effects Editing
Gary Rydstrom	2	71st	1998	Saving Private Ryan	Best Sound, Best Sound Effects Editing
Stephen Schwartz	2	68th	1995	Pocahontas	Best Original Score, Best Original Song
Edward Selzer	2	22nd	1949	So Much for So Little; For Scent-imental Reasons	Best Documentary (Short Subject); Best Short Subject (Cartoon)
Ben Sharpsteen	2	31st	1958	White Wilderness; Ama Girls	Best Documentary (Feature); Best Documentary (Short Subject)
Richard M. Sherman	2	37th	1964	Mary Poppins	Best Original Score, Best Original Song
Robert B. Sherman	2	37th	1964	Mary Poppins	Best Original Score, Best Original Song
Howard Shore	2	76th	2003	The Lord of the Rings: The Return of the King	Best Original Score, Best Original Song
Steven Spielberg	2	66th	1993	Schindler's List	Best Picture, Best Director
Richard Taylor	2	74th	2001	The Lord of the Rings: The Fellowship of the Ring	Best Visual Effects, Best Makeup
Richard Taylor	2	76th	2003	The Lord of the Rings: The Return of the King	Best Costume Design, Best Makeup
Dimitri Tiomkin	2	25th	1952	High Noon	Best Original Score, Best Original Song
John Truscott	2	40th	1967	Camelot	Best Art Direction, Best Costume Design
Marcel Vertès	2	25th	1952	Moulin Rouge	Best Art Direction (color), Best Costume Design (color)
Ned Washington	2	13th	1940	Pinocchio	Best Original Score, Best Original Song
Billy Wilder	2	18th	1945	The Lost Weekend	Best Director, Best Adapted Screenplay
Stan Winston	2	64th	1991	Terminator 2: Judgment Day	Best Makeup, Best Visual Effects
Robert Wise	2	34th	1961	West Side Story	Best Picture, Best Director
Robert Wise	2	38th	1965	The Sound of Music	Best Picture, Best Director
Joseph C. Wright	2	15th	1942	This Above All; My Gal Sal	Best Art Direction (black & white); Best Art Direction (color)
Fred Zinnemann	2	39th	1966	A Man for All Seasons	Best Picture, Best Director

== Superlatives ==
- First persons to win multiple Academy Awards in a single year

Pierre Collings and Sheridan Gibney were the first individuals to win multiple Academy Awards in a single year; they wrote the script based on their own story, leading to wins for both Best Screenplay and Best Original Story (The Story of Louis Pasteur) at the 9th Academy Awards, honoring the films of 1936.

- Person to win the most Academy Awards in a single year

The record for the most Academy Awards won by a person at a single ceremony is four. Walt Disney won Best Documentary, Features, for The Living Desert; Best Documentary, Short Subjects, for The Alaskan Eskimo; Best Short Subject, Cartoons, for Toot, Whistle, Plunk and Boom; and Best Short Subject, Two-Reel, for Bear Country at the 26th Academy Awards, intended to honor the films of 1953. Walt Disney also holds the record for winning with the most different films in a single year (four); no other person has won simultaneously with more than two films. Sean Baker won Best Picture, Best Director, Best Original Screenplay, and Best Editing, all for Anora at the 97th Academy Awards, intended to honor the films of 2024. Baker is the only individual to win four Oscars for the same movie.

- Person to win multiple Academy Awards the most times

The record for most times a person has won multiple Academy Awards at a single ceremony is four. Alan Menken won Best Original Score for The Little Mermaid (1989), Beauty and the Beast (1991), Aladdin (1992), and Pocahontas (1995), as well as Best Original Song for "Under the Sea", "Beauty and the Beast", "A Whole New World", and "Colors of the Wind" from each of those respective films.

- Persons to win multiple Academy Awards in consecutive years

Three individuals have won multiple Academy Awards in consecutive years. Gordon Hollingshead (1945 and 1946), Joseph L. Mankiewicz (1949 and 1950), and Alan Menken (1991 and 1992).

- Ceremony produced the most multiple Academy Award winners

The most multiple Academy Award winners produced in one night is five. A record was set at the 23rd Academy Awards, intended to honor the films of 1950.

- Film produced the most multiple Academy Award winners

The Lord of the Rings: The Return of the King (2003) produced four multiple Academy Award winners at the 76th Academy Awards. Peter Jackson and Fran Walsh shared the Oscars for producing (Best Picture) and screenwriting (Best Adapted Screenplay), with each separately awarded for Best Director (Jackson) and Best Original Song (Walsh), and both Howard Shore and Richard Taylor won two for Best Original Score and Best Original Song and for Best Costume Design and Best Makeup, respectively.

- Female multiple Academy Awards winners in a single year

Six women have won multiple Academy Awards in a single year. Edith Head, Catherine Martin, Fran Walsh, Kathryn Bigelow, Frances McDormand, and Chloé Zhao. Edith Head was the first woman to win multiple Oscars in a single year; she won Best Costume Design, Black-and-White (All About Eve) and Best Costume Design, Color (Samson and Delilah) at the 23rd Academy Awards, honoring the films of 1950. Fran Walsh has the most wins by a woman at a single ceremony (the 76th Academy Awards) with three; she won for producing (Best Picture), screenwriting (Best Adapted Screenplay), and songwriting (Best Original Song), all for The Lord of the Rings: The Return of the King (2003). Catherine Martin became the first woman to accomplish this feat multiple times; she won both Best Costume Design and Best Production Design for Moulin Rouge! (2001) and The Great Gatsby (2013). Frances McDormand and Chloé Zhao are the first female team to win multiple Oscars for the same film; they shared the Oscar for producing (Best Picture), with each separately awarded for Best Director (Zhao) and Best Actress (McDormand), all for Nomadland at the 93rd Academy Awards, honoring the films of 2020 and 2021. Zhao is also the first woman of color to win multiple Oscars in a single year.

- Longest time span between first and last occasion to win multiple Academy Awards in a single year

In a time span of 15 years, Billy Wilder won both Best Director and Best Adapted Screenplay for The Lost Weekend (1945), and another three for Best Picture, Best Director, and Best Original Screenplay, all for The Apartment (1960).

== Statistics ==
- Awards ceremonies: To date, there have been 97 annual awards ceremonies; 57 ceremonies had 96 multiple award winners, while 40 ceremonies had none.
  - 1 ceremony produced 5 multiple award winners (23rd Academy Awards)
  - 2 ceremonies produced 4 multiple award winners (76th and 91st Academy Awards)
  - 6 ceremonies produced 3 multiple award winners
  - 17 ceremonies produced 2 multiple award winners
  - 31 ceremonies produced 1 multiple award winner
  - 40 ceremonies produced 0 multiple award winners
- Individual winners: To date, 84 individuals have won multiple awards in a single year; 10 of these did so more than once.
  - 1 individual won multiple awards 4 times (Alan Menken)
  - 1 individual won multiple awards 3 times (Gary Rydstrom)
  - 8 individuals won multiple awards 2 times
  - 74 individuals won multiple awards 1 time
- Multiple awards: To date, there have been 97 occasions on which individuals won multiple awards in a single year; these occasions produced a total of 211 awards.
  - on 2 occasions, an individual won 4 awards in a single year (Walt Disney, 26th Academy Awards; Sean Baker, 97th Academy Awards)
  - on 13 occasions, individuals won 3 awards in a single year
  - on 82 occasions, individuals won 2 awards in a single year
