= Mickey Mousing =

Animation technique that syncs the accompanying music with the actions on screen

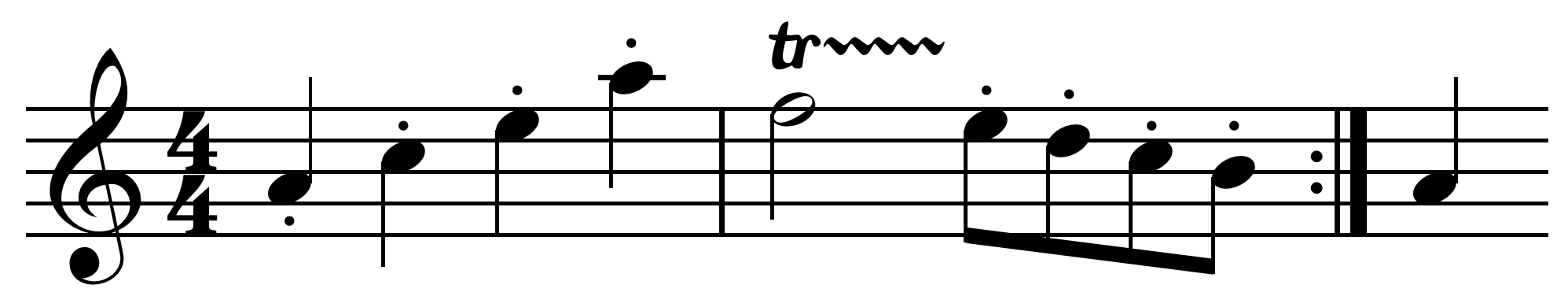
Mickey Mousing occurred with forms of the Villain's Theme, such as with steps synchronized with the notes

In animation and film, "Mickey Mousing" (synchronized, mirrored, or parallel scoring) is a film technique that syncs the accompanying music with the actions on screen, "Matching movement to music", or "The exact segmentation of the music analogue to the picture." (Note: The "split-second synchronization of music with visual movement". "[Close] Synchronization of music and image." Following "the physical action of a character with similar musical movements". "The subtle film composer's art of linking a bit of music to a specific on-screen action or character reference.") The term comes from the early and mid-production Walt Disney films, where the music almost completely works to mimic the animated motions of the characters. Mickey Mousing may use music to "reinforce an action by mimicking its rhythm exactly. Frequently used in the 1930s and 1940s, especially by Max Steiner, (Note: "Steiner used Mickey Mousing sparingly, mostly saving it for key cinematic moments." "Max Steiner, the composer who most often used Mickey-Mousing as a compositional technique" "Mickey Mousing ... is particularly prominent in the scores of Max Steiner." "Steiner ... is ... the composer who utilized [Mickey Mousing] most.") it is somewhat out of favor today, at least in serious films, because of overuse. However, it can still be effective if used imaginatively". Mickey Mousing and synchronicity help structure the viewing experience, to indicate how much events should impact the viewer, and to provide information not present on screen. The technique "enable[s] the music to be seen to 'participate' in the action and for it to be quickly and formatively interpreted ... and [to] also intensify the experience of the scene for the spectator." Mickey Mousing may also create unintentional humor, and be used in parody or self-reference.

It is often not the music that is synced to the animated action, but the other way around. This is especially so when the music is a classical or other well-known piece. In such cases, the music for the animation is pre-recorded, and an animator will have an exposure sheet with the beats marked on it, frame by frame, and can time the movements accordingly. In the 1940 film Fantasia, the musical piece The Sorcerer's Apprentice by Paul Dukas, composed in the 1890s, contains a fragment that is used to accompany the actions of Mickey Mouse himself. At one point Mickey, as the apprentice, seizes an axe and chops an enchanted broom to pieces so that it will stop carrying water to a pit. The visual action is synchronized exactly to crashing chords in the music.

== Examples ==
This sequence in The Skeleton Dance (1929) is an early example of the technique.

The first known use of Mickey Mousing was in Steamboat Willie (1928), the first Mickey Mouse cartoon by Walt Disney, scored by Wilfred Jackson. In the 1931 Van Beuren Studios animated short Making 'Em Move the "Mysterioso Pizzicato" theme is Mickey Moused to the action first to produce a "false sense of foreboding" as a curious visitor enters the animation factory, and then again to accompany the villain in a cartoon-within-a-cartoon. King Kong (1933) uses Mickey Mousing throughout, and is described by MacDonald as, "perhaps the single most noteworthy aspect of Steiner's score for King Kong." The descending scale segments accompanying the chief's walk down stairs towards Denham's party continue after the camera cuts to the Denham, implying the chief's continued descent and maintaining suspense. Some scenes in The Informer (1935) were filmed in synch with a prerecorded score. In Casablanca (1942), the technique is only used at the end of the film when Captain Renault throws away a bottle of Vichy water. Rhapsody Rabbit (1946) depicts Bugs Bunny slip back and forth between performing Hungarian Rhapsody and various music Mickey Mousing his actions. Cartoon examples include Tom and Jerry (1940–1957), The Ugly Duckling (1931), Dizzy Dishes (1930), and Barnacle Bill (1930). Paul Smith used the technique in several scores for True-Life Adventures documentary films in the fifties, including In Beaver Valley, Nature's Half Acre, Water Birds, and The Olympic Elk.

An example of Mickey Mousing is used in Monty Norman's score to the first James Bond film, Dr. No (1962), in which Bond repeatedly strikes a tarantula which had crawled into his bed. Writers have noted its anachronistic appearance in the context of the whole series, as prolific Bond composer John Barry never used it in any of the subsequent films. The technique is also used to accompany Bill Sikes's beating murder of Nancy in the film Oliver! (1968). In this case, the music is partially used to "cover" her cries as she is being struck. In Kenneth Branagh's Much Ado About Nothing (1993), Mickey Mousing is used at the opening, with the visual slowed to match the music, producing an intentional lightly comical effect.

In video games, Mickey Mousing may occur in dynamic audio compositions, such as in reaction or for indication (for example, in response to character action or to alert the player to the end of a countdown), and is often found in platform games.

== Criticism ==
The term "Mickey Mousing" is also used as a pejorative to imply that a technique used in productions aimed at adults is too simplistic and more appropriate for a juvenile audience. The technique is also associated with melodrama. The technique is criticized for visual action that is – without good reason – being duplicated in accompanying music or text, therefore being a weakness of the production rather than a strength. Newlin lists six other functions which music may serve besides this one. Complaints regarding the technique may be found as early as 1946, when Chuck Jones complained that, "For some reason, many cartoon musicians are more concerned with exact synchronization or 'Mickey-Mousing' than with the originality of their contribution or the variety of their arrangement." In 1954, Jean Cocteau described Mickey Mousing as the most vulgar technique used in film music. In 1958, Hanns Eisler described Mickey Mousing as, "This awful Wagnerian illustration technique! When they speak about a dog, someone in the orchestra barks...for love we have the divisi violins in E Major...This is unbearable."

"It is interesting that Mickey Mousing has come to represent the worst excesses of the Hollywood film score. Perhaps as contemporary spectators we are no longer used to Mickey Mousing in films (its use radically diminished in the fifties and after). Still, the practice of catching every moment with music has a visual equivalent, and Mickey Mousing has been made to bear the brunt of the criticism for an overobnoxiousness that it only partially creates."

== See also ==
- Audio and sports commentary
- Narrative
- Theme music
- Word painting
