= Disney Time =

Series of British holiday specials

- Genre: Family
- Presented by: Various
- Original language: English

Original release
- Network: BBC One
- Release: 25 December 1961 – 31 August 1998

Disney Time is a television series that ran in the UK on the BBC, and also ITV at one point between 1961 and 1998. It was a regular holiday schedule filler. Clips of Disney films were introduced by celebrity hosts, which over the years included Paul and Linda McCartney, Noel Edmonds, Sarah Greene, Doctor Who's Tom Baker, The Goodies and Phillip Schofield.

The following (incomplete) list is of programmes broadcast on BBC1. Prior to 1971, Christmas editions were always shown on Christmas Day itself.

== 1960s ==
=== 1961 ===
David Jacobs hosted The World of Walt Disney, a compilation of excerpts on Christmas Day with clips from Pinocchio, Bambi, Song of the South, Melody Time, Bear Country, The Vanishing Prairie, Perri, Nikki, Wild Dog of the North, Moon Pilot, Bon Voyage, In Search of the Castaways and The Prince and the Pauper. It starred Guy Williams as Miles Hendon, and Sean Scully in the dual roles of Prince Edward and Tom Canty and Babes in Toyland.

=== 1962 ===
Hayley in Disneyland – Hayley Mills meets Walt Disney in Hollywood on Christmas Day and introduces some of her favourite Disney films with scenes from Snow White and the Seven Dwarfs, Fantasia, Dumbo, Alice in Wonderland, Peter Pan, The Legend of Lobo, 20,000 Leagues Under the Sea, The African Lion, Summer Magic and In Search of the Castaways both which starred Mills.

=== 1963 ===
Walt Disney on Christmas Day with David Tomlinson introducing scenes from Alice in Wonderland, Peter Pan, Treasure Island, The Story of Robin Hood, The Reluctant Dragon, The Wind in the Willows, Swiss Family Robinson, In Search of the Castaways, 101 Dalmatians, Mary Poppins, Dr Syn, Alias the Scarecrow, The Three Lives of Thomasina and The Sword in the Stone.

=== 1964 ===
Julie Andrews introduced Disney Time on Christmas Day with excerpts from Pluto's Christmas Tree, Snow White and the Seven Dwarfs, The Living Desert, Emil and the Detectives, The Vanishing Prairie, Peter Pan, The Monkey's Uncle, The Three Caballeros, Bon Voyage!, The Legend of Lobo, Pinocchio, Those Calloways, Lady and the Tramp and Mary Poppins.

=== 1965 ===
Susan Hampshire with the help of Matthew Garber hosted the August Bank Holiday show on 29 August with excerpts from The Three Lives of Thomasina which Susan Hampshire starred in, Lady and the Tramp, The Incredible Journey, That Darn Cat!, Song of the South, The Sword in the Stone, Swiss Family Robinson, The Monkey's Uncle, Peter Pan, Winnie the Pooh and the Honey Tree, Mary Poppins and How to Ride a Horse.

Maurice Chevalier hosted the Christmas Day show with excerpts from Snow White and the Seven Dwarfs, Bon Voyage!, Pinocchio, That Darn Cat!, In Search of the Castaways, Fantasia, A Country Coyote Goes Hollywood, Winnie the Pooh and the Honey Tree, The Waltz King, Peter Pan, Emil and the Detectives, Summer Magic, A Square Peg in a Round Hole, The Ugly Dachshund, Monkeys, Go Home! which starred Chevalier and Mary Poppins.

=== 1966 ===
Nancy Kwan hosted the Easter show on 11 April with excerpts from Alice in Wonderland, The Waltz King, Mary Poppins, Peter Pan, The Ugly Dachshund, The Incredible Journey, Cinderella, Winnie the Pooh and the Honey Tree, Tenderfoot, Darby O'Gill and the Little People and Lt. Robin Crusoe, U.S.N..

Susan Hampshire hosted the August Bank Holiday show on 28 August with clips from Kidnapped, Lady and the Tramp, In Search of the Castaways, Jungle Cat, The Absent-Minded Professor, 20,000 Leagues Under the Sea, 101 Dalmatians, Perri, Rob Roy, the Highland Rogue, The Hunting Instinct, Lt. Robin Crusoe, U.S.N., The Fighting Prince of Donegal.

Rolf Harris presented the Christmas Day show with extracts from Lady and the Tramp, Peter Pan, The Wind in the Willows, Follow Me, Boys!, Ballerina, The Fighting Prince of Donegal, Mary Poppins and Winnie the Pooh and the Honey Tree.

=== 1967 ===
The Easter show on 27 March was a three handed international – Leslie Crowther with Peter Glaze and from Paris Maurice Chevalier introducing clips from Fantasia, Bambi, Follow Me, Boys!, In Search of the Castaways, Monkeys, Go Home! starring Maurice Chevalier, The Wind in the Willows, The Gnome-Mobile, Peter Pan and Song of the South.

Tommy Steele presented the August Bank Holiday show on 28 August with excerpts from Peter Pan, Treasure Island, Fun and Fancy Free, The Gnome-Mobile, The Million Dollar Collar, Three Little Pigs, The Story of Robin Hood, The Jungle Book, The Adventures of Bullwhip Griffin and The Happiest Millionaire starring Tommy Steele.

The Christmas Day show was introduced by Dick Van Dyke with clips from Snow White and the Seven Dwarfs, Fantasia, Bear Country, Mary Poppins starring Dick Van Dyke, The Happiest Millionaire, Blackbeard's Ghost, Never a Dull Moment also starring Van Dyke, and The Jungle Book.

=== 1968 ===
Peter Ustinov hosted the Easter show on 14 April and introduced excerpts from Rob Roy, the Highland Rogue, The Fighting Prince of Donegal, The Reluctant Dragon, A Knight for a Day, The Happiest Millionaire, The Jungle Book and Blackbeard's Ghost which he starred in.

Leslie Crowther presented the August Bank Holiday show on 2 September and introduced clips from Mary Poppins, The Absent-Minded Professor, Blackbeard's Ghost, The Happiest Millionaire, Bon Voyage!, The Parent Trap, Donald's Weekend, The Jungle Book, Never a Dull Moment and Cinderella.

Val Doonican hosted the Christmas Day show with clips from Bambi, Mary Poppins, Peter Pan, The Jungle Book, Donald's Snow Fight, The Happiest Millionaire, Never a Dull Moment and Cinderella.

=== 1969 ===
Easter Monday fell on 7 April and Disney Time was introduced by Stratford Johns including scenes from Fantasia, That Darn Cat!, The Jungle Book, Winnie the Pooh and the Blustery Day, Cinderella, The Love Bug, Sammy, the Way-Out Seal and The Shaggy Dog.

Petula Clark presented the Whitsun show with clips from 101 Dalmatians, The Absent-Minded Professor, Swiss Family Robinson, The Wind in the Willows, Guns in the Heather, Cinderella, Seal Island and The Love Bug.

The August Bank Holiday show on 1 September was hosted by Cilla Black from Blackpool with excerpts from 101 Dalmatians, Ride a Northbound Horse, Mary Poppins, Bon Voyage!, Third Man on the Mountain, Hawaiian Holiday, Alice in Wonderland, The Love Bug and Dumbo.

Julie Andrews introduces scenes and characters from some of her favourite Disney films including Fantasia, The Jungle Book, Swiss Family Robinson, Winnie the Pooh and the Blustery Day, King of the Grizzlies, 20,000 Leagues Under the Sea, 101 Dalmatians, Pluto's Christmas Tree, Mary Poppins which starred Andrews and Alice in Wonderland.

== 1970s ==
=== 1970 ===
- The Easter edition on 30 March introduced by Jimmy Tarbuck with scenes from Alice in Wonderland, Snow White and the Seven Dwarfs, Treasure Island, King of the Grizzlies, My Dog, the Thief (1969), A Hundred and One Dalmatians, The Computer Wore Tennis Shoes and In Search of the Castaways
- Cliff Richard introduced this Whitsun programme of Walt Disney films – The Living Desert, Pinocchio, Lady and the Tramp, The Love Bug, King of the Grizzlies, Alice in Wonderland, In Search of the Castaways, Hang your hat on the wind, and Jungle Book
- Ken Dodd hosted the August Bank Holiday edition from Scarborough where he was appearing at the Futurist Theatre with excerpts from Cinderella, Dumbo, Pinocchio, In Search of the Castaways, 20,000 Leagues under the Sea, The Boatniks, Smoke, Treasure Island and The Aristocats
- Harry Worth hosted Disney Time on Christmas Day at 4.30pm and introduced clips from Snow White and the Seven Dwarfs, Pinocchio, Perri, That Darn Cat, Smoke, Jungle Book, The Aristocats and Charlie the lonesome Cougar

=== 1971 ===
- The Easter edition was introduced by Harry Secombe on 12 April from his home in Surrey. Clips include Swiss Family Robinson, Dumbo, The Wild Country, The Sword in the Stone, The Hunting Instinct (Donald Duck), The Barefoot Executive and The Aristocats
- The Whitsun Holiday was introduced by Lulu – Robin Hood, Alice in Wonderland, Pinocchio, Swiss Family Robinson, The Wild Country, One Hundred and One Dalmatians and Million Dollar Duck
- On August Bank Holiday Disney Time was introduced by Derek Nimmo from the South of France with excerpts from Sleeping Beauty, The Living Desert, Scandalous John, The Aristocats, Treasure Island, Fantasia, The Boat Builders, Track of the Giant Snow Bear and Bedknobs and Broomsticks
- Valerie Singleton, Peter Purves and John Noakes from Blue Peter hosted the Christmas Disney Time on 27 December with clips from Sleeping Beauty, Treasure Island, Robin Hood, Swiss Family Robinson, Wind in the Willows, Snow White and the Seven Dwarfs and Bedknobs and Broomsticks

=== 1972 ===
- The Easter edition was introduced by Bruce Forsyth on 3 April and clips included Dumbo, Sleeping Beauty, Lt Robin Crusoe USN, Bedknobs and Broomsticks, Mickey Mouse Anniversary Show, Babes in Toyland, Now You See Him, Now You Don't, Bear Island and The Three Caballeros
- Terry Thomas introduced the Whitsun show with excerpts from Dumbo, One Hundred and One Dalmatians, Robin Hood (not the 1973 cartoon), The Love Bug, Winnie the Pooh and the Honey Tree, Menace on the Mountain, Napoleon and Samantha, Now You See Him, Now You Don't
- The August Bank Holiday show featured clips from Snow White and the Seven Dwarfs, The Aristocats, Napoleon and Samantha, Now You See Him, Now You Don't, The Living Desert, The Gnome-Mobile, Pablo and the Dancing Chihuahua and the Mickey Mouse Anniversary Show - Dick Emery hosted from Clacton On Sea.
- Rolf Harris hosted the Christmas Disney Time on Christmas Eve from the Odeon, Leicester Square with excerpts from Snow White, Peter and the Wolf, Cinderella, Mickey Mouse Bear Country, Darby O'Gill and the Little People and Snowball Express.

=== 1973 ===
- Roy Castle hosted the Easter show on 23 April from the National Sports Centre, Crystal Palace with excerpts from Snow White and the Seven Dwarfs, Diamonds on Wheels, Mary Poppins, Snowball Express, Robin Hood, The World's Greatest Athlete, The Sword and the Stone, Saludos Amigos, The Incredible Journey and The Absent-Minded Professor.
- The Whitsun show was introduced by Jon Pertwee from Stockholm with scenes from Mary Poppins, Alice in Wonderland, Pinocchio, The Incredible Journey, Diamonds on Wheels, The Sword in the Stone, The Gnome-Mobile, Fun and Fancy Free and The World's Greatest Athlete
- Stanley Holloway hosted the August Bank Holiday show on 27 August – no clips are listed
- Paul and Linda McCartney hosted the Christmas Disney Time on Boxing Day with scenes from Pinocchio, Mary Poppins, Wild Geese Calling, Run Cougar Run, Bambi, The World's Greatest Athlete, 101 Dalmatians, Snow White, Herbie Rides Again and Robin Hood

=== 1974 ===
- Graham Hill from Brands Hatch introduced the Easter edition with clips from Song of the South, One Little Indian, One Hundred and One Dalmatians, That Darn' Cat, Run Cougar Run, Robin Hood, Superdad, Dumbo, Three Caballeros, The Absent Minded Professor and Herbie Rides Again
- The Whitsun holiday show was hosted by Don Maclean and Peter Glaze on 27 May and featured excerpts from Peter Pan, Herbie Rides Again, Song of the South, Three Caballeros, Fun and Fancy Free, One Little Indian, That Darn Cat and Superdad
- On August Bank Holiday the show was introduced by Rod Hull and Emu with scenes from That Darn Cat, Mickey's Fire Brigade, Superdad, Peter Pan, Alice in Wonderland, Island at the Top of the World, Charlie and the Angel and Song of the South
- Derek Nimmo hosted the Christmas edition, not on Boxing Day but on the previous Saturday, 21 December and included clips from Peter Pan, Island at the Top of the World, Mary Poppins, Cast-away Cowboy, Winnie the Pooh and Tigger Too, Sleeping Beauty, Robin Hood and One of Our Dinosaurs is Missing

=== 1975 ===
- The Easter show was presented by Leslie Crowther with scenes from Lady and the Tramp, Island at the Top of the World, Winnie the Pooh and Tigger Too, Escape to Witch Mountain, The Bears and I, Three Caballeros, Castaway Cowboy and Mickey Mouse Anniversary Show
- Ed Stewart hosted the Whitsun show from the Queen Elizabeth Hospital for Children, Hackney Road, London. The films included Jungle Book, Escape to Witch Mountain, Lady and the Tramp, The Bears and I, The Apple Dumpling Gang and The Hunting Instinct
- Tom Baker (in costume and in character as the Fourth Doctor, not as himself) hosted the August Bank Holiday Disney Time on 25 August and introduced excerpts from Clock Cleaners, Blackbeard's Ghost, The Jungle Book, African Lion, The Apple Dumpling Gang, Bedknobs and Broomsticks, Return of the Big Cat, Escape to Witch Mountain and Lady and the Tramp. The show ended with the Doctor leaving in the TARDIS to go to the aid of Brigadier Lethbridge-Stewart, a tie-in with the start of Terror of the Zygons the following Saturday.
- Bing Crosby hosted the Christmas Disney Time on Boxing Day with clips from Jungle Book, Lady and the Tramp, The Apple Dumpling Gang, The Legend of Sleepy Hollow, Donald's Snow Fight, Melody Time, Return of the Big Cat and One of Our Dinosaurs is Missing.

=== 1976 ===
- Easter Monday fell on 19 April and Disney Time was presented by Roy Castle with scenes from A Hundred and One Dalmatians, Nikki, Wild Dog of the North, Man, Monsters and Mysteries, The Absent-Minded Professor, Escape from the Dark, Bambi, Black-beard's Ghost, One of Our Dinosaurs is Missing, Mail Pilot and Fun and Fancy Free.
- The Whitsun show was hosted by Shari Lewis With Hush Puppy, Lamb Chop, Charlie Horse and Dandylion with scenes from Robin Hood, Blackbeard's Ghost, Bambi, One of Our Dinosaurs is Missing, Peter Pan, Lady and the Tramp, Jungle Book, Escape from the Dark and No Deposit, No Return.
- August Bank Holiday was on Monday 30th and the show was presented by Bernard Cribbins and included scenes from Bambi, Escape from the Dark, 101 Dalmatians, No Deposit, No Return, The Strongest Man in the World and Winnie the Pooh and the Honey Tree
- The Goodies hosted Christmas Disney Time on Boxing Day at 5:50 pm. It was presented from Selfridges store in London, and featured clips from Cinderella, Ride a Wild Pony, 101 Dalmatians, Dumbo, Jungle Book, The Shaggy DA, Bambi, The Treasure of Matecumbe and Winnie the Pooh and the Honey Tree.

=== 1977 ===
- The Easter show on 8 April was hosted by John Craven and clips included Cinderella, Bambi, Treasure of Matecumbe, Wind in the Willows, Freaky Friday, The Shaggy DA and Pinocchio
- The Whitsun bank holiday was moved back one week to coincide with the Queen Elizabeth II Silver Jubilee holiday and Disney Time was on Tuesday 6 June (which was also the 33rd anniversary of D-Day). The show was presented by Noel Edmonds and excerpts included Cinderella, The Rescuers, The Shaggy DA, Swiss Family Robinson, Freaky Friday and Peter Pan
- August Bank Holiday fell on the 29th – Disney Time was hosted by Val Doonican from Bournemouth and included Song of the South, Swiss Family Robinson, Freaky Friday, Donald Duck Goes West, The Rescuers, The Shaggy DA and Cinderella.
- David Jacobs hosted Christmas Disney Time in a special to celebrate 50 episodes of the show (he introduced the very first show in 1961) on Holiday Tuesday, as Boxing Day was on a Sunday this year. He played host to some of the many stars who appeared in Disney films over the years. Sean Connery, Karen Dotrice, Jodie Foster, Susan Hampshire, Dean Jones, Sir John Mills, Hayley Mills and Peter Ustinov are amongst the celebrities who introduced scenes from their films including Darby O'Gill and the Little People, Mary Poppins, Candleshoe, Thomasina, Herbie goes to Monte Carlo, The Swiss Family Robinson, In Search of the Castaways, Robin Hood, Cinderella, The Rescuers and Pete's Dragon

=== 1978 ===
- This Easter edition was introduced by Cliff Richard on 27 March. Films included The Rescuers, Alice in Wonderland, Candleshoe, 20,000 Leagues Under the Sea, Mary Poppins, That Darn Cat, Pinocchio and Herbie Goes to Monte Carlo.
- Penelope Keith presented the Whitsun show from Brighton with clips from Alice in Wonderland, Fantasia, Herbie Goes to Monte Carlo, Swiss Family Robinson, Pinocchio, Pete's Dragon, One Hundred and One Dalmatians, The Boatniks Hawaiian Holiday, Candleshoe and Jungle Book
- The August Bank Holiday show was hosted by Little and Large from Great Yarmouth with excerpts from Pinocchio, Herbie Goes to Monte Carlo, Cinderella, Treasure Island, The Rescuers, Cat from Outer Space, Pete's Dragon, Snow White and the Seven Dwarfs, and Diamonds on Wheels.
- Paul Daniels presented the Boxing Day Disney Time. Film clips included 20,000 Leagues Under the Sea, Fantasia, Return from Witch Mountain, Alice in Wonderland, Pete's Dragon, Cat from Outer Space, Sword in the Stone and Sleeping Beauty

=== 1979 ===
- John Noakes hosted Easter Disney Time on 14 April at 5:30 pm from Port Hamble. Films included Fantasia, Bedknobs and Broomsticks, The Aristocats, Lady and the Tramp, 20,000 Leagues Under the Sea and Return from Witch Mountain
- Whitsun Disney Time on 28 May at 6:00 pm for the first time from Scotland, with the traditional mixture of new films and old favourites, both cartoon and live-action. Introduced by Isla St Clair from Troon, Ayrshire clips included Dumbo, Bambi, The Sword in the Stone, Bedknobs and Broomsticks, The Spaceman and King Arthur, Rob Roy, Hill's Angels and Greyfriars Bobby.
- Jim Davidson hosted August Bank Holiday Disney Time on 27 August at 6:00 pm from Torbay. Excerpts from Dumbo, The Spaceman and King Arthur, Bedknobs and Broomsticks, Winnie the Pooh and the Blustery Day, The Incredible Journey, Hill's Angels, The London Connection and The Aristocats.
- Rod Hull and Emu hosted Christmas Disney Time on Boxing Day at 5:10 pm and featured clips from The Aristocats, The Love Bug, The Ugly Dachshund, Sleeping Beauty and the new Disney science fiction film, The Black Hole.

== 1980s ==
=== 1980 ===
- Paul Daniels hosted a Disney Time on 7 April at 5:30 pm
- Mike Yarwood hosted Whitsun Disney Time on 24 May at 5:40 pm.
- Jerry Stevens hosted August Bank Holiday Disney Time on Saturday 23 August at 6:15 pm.
- Marti Caine hosted Christmas Disney Time on Boxing Day at 5:10 pm.

=== 1981 ===
This year there was an extra programme:

- Felicity Kendal hosted the Easter Disney Time on 18 April at 5:25 pm.
- Kenny Everett hosted the Whitsun Disney Time on 25 May with clips from Fantasia, Peter Pan, Popeye, Robin Hood. The Rescuers, Condorman, Herbie Goes Bananas, Cinderella, Sleeping Beauty and The Incredible Journey
- Penelope Keith hosted a special Disney Time for the wedding of Prince Charles and Lady Diana Spencer on 29 July at 5:05 pm.
- Lenny Henry hosted the August Bank Holiday Disney Time on 31 August at 5:25 pm.
- Windsor Davies hosted the Christmas Disney Time on Boxing Day at 6:00 pm.

=== 1982 ===
- Jimmy Tarbuck hosted Easter Disney Time on 12 April at 5:10 pm.
- Kenny Everett hosted August Bank Holiday Disney Time on 30 August at 5:25pm
- Rolf Harris hosted Christmas Disney Time on Christmas Sunday at 5:20pm

=== 1983 ===
- Cilla Black hosted Easter Disney Time on 4 April at 5:10 pm. It featured clips from Snow White and the Seven Dwarfs, Robin Hood, Herbie Rides Again, Condorman, Island at the Top of the World and Tron.
- Stu Francis hosted Whitsun Disney Time on 30 May at 5:35pm.
- Bob Monkhouse hosted August Bank Holiday Disney Time on 29 August at 5:25pm.
- Mike Read hosted Christmas Disney Time on Holiday Tuesday at 4:40pm.

=== 1984 ===
- Noel Edmonds hosted Easter Disney Time on 24 April at 5:20pm.
- Su Pollard hosted Whitsun Disney Time on 28 May at 5:05pm.
- Keith Harris hosted August Bank Holiday Disney Time on 27 August at 5:05pm.
- Paul Nicholas hosted Christmas Disney Time on New Year's Day at 5:20pm.

=== 1985 ===
- The Krankies hosted Easter Disney Time on 8 April at 5:20pm.
- Les Dennis and Dustin Gee hosted Whitsun Disney Time on 27 May at 5:10pm.
- Ruth Madoc hosted August Bank Holiday Disney Time on 26 August at 5:10pm.
- Jan Francis hosted Christmas Disney Time on Boxing Day at 4:10pm.

=== 1986 ===
- Mike Smith hosted Easter Disney Time on 31 March at 5:20pm.
- Bernie Winters hosted Whitsun Disney Time on 25 May at 5:50pm.
- Rolf Harris hosted August Bank Holiday Disney Time on 25 August at 5:15pm.
- Little and Large hosted Christmas Disney Time on Boxing Day at 4:00pm.

=== 1987 ===
- David Jason hosted Easter Disney Time on 20 April at 5:20pm.
- Phillip Schofield hosted Whitsun Disney Time on 25 May at 5:25pm.
- Les Dawson hosted August Bank Holiday Disney Time on 31 August at 6:15pm.
- Kenny Everett hosted Christmas Disney Time on 28 December at 4:00pm.

=== 1988 ===
- Anneka Rice hosted Easter Disney Time on 4 April at 5:20pm with clips from Jungle Book, Pinocchio, The Fox and the Hound, Make Mine Music, Fantasia, and Bedknobs and Broomsticks
- The Whitsun show was presented by Anne Robinson. Films included: Jungle Book, The Aristocats, Cinderella, Snow White and the Seven Dwarfs
- Gary Wilmot introduced the August Bank Holiday show with excerpts from Dumbo, Jungle Book, Fantasia, Bambi, Lady and the Tramp and Mary Poppins
- The Boxing Day Disney Time was hosted by David Essex with clips from Snow White, Cinderella, Sleeping Beauty, Fantasia, and 101 Dalmatians.

=== 1989 ===
- The Easter edition was hosted by Matt Goss of Bros. with clips from Jungle Book, Lady and the Tramp, Alice in Wonderland, Song of the South, Dumbo and Blackbeard's Ghost
- At Whitsun Disney Time was presented by Lulu with excerpts from Lady and the Tramp, Jungle Book, Peter Pan, Mary Poppins, Cinderella and Pinocchio.
- The August Bank Holiday edition was hosted by Frank Bruno. Films include Jungle Book, The Rescuers, Bambi, Oliver and Company and Cinderella.

For the first year since 1960 there was no Disney Time show on BBC1 over the Christmas holidays at all.

== 1990s ==
=== 1990 ===
- This year there was just the Boxing Day show with Phillip Schofield from Disney World. This was stated to be the 100th show by the host. The first three clips are: the hippos from Fantasia (1940), the lawnmower scene from Honey I Shrunk the Kids (1989), and the rowing and serenade scene from The Little Mermaid (1990). After this, the show moves on to a sleigh-riding scene from Ernest Saves Christmas (1988), the scene from Ducktales the Movie (1990) when they find the lost lamp, and a scene from the 1990 film Dick Tracy, where the Kid rescues Dick. The show also includes a behind-the-scenes look at the restoration of Fantasia, before moving on to a clip from The Sorcerer's Apprentice. The next clip, Toy Tinkers (1949), is a Christmas-themed animated short film, featuring Chip and Dale and also Donald Duck. The episode concludes with a clip from Lady and the Tramp (1955).

=== 1991 ===
Disney Time returned to its former pattern of being shown on most UK Bank Holidays, although every show was presented by Phillip Schofield.

- The Easter show was broadcast on 1 April from Warwick Castle with excerpts from Alice in Wonderland, The Rescuers, Mickey Through the Looking Glass, Three Men and A Little Lady and Sleeping Beauty.
- Whitsun Bank Holiday Disney Time was on 26 May – Phillip Schofield was assisted by Paul Daniels and clips included Cinderella, Mary Poppins and The Sword in the Stone
- The August Bank Holiday show was broadcast on 26 August with excerpts from Dumbo, Peter Pan and the latest smash hit – The Rocketeer.
- From Walt Disney World in Florida, Phillip Schofield introduced the Christmas edition on 28 December – clips with a nautical flavour from such films as Pinocchio, Bedknobs and Broomsticks, The Little Mermaid and Mickey's Christmas Carol.

=== 1992 ===
- From the Tower of London Phillip Schofield introduced the Easter edition on 19 April – no further details are available.
- The Whitsun (25 May) show came from Euro Disney in France, Phillip Schofield presented a rollercoaster ride of clips from films such as The Rocketeer, and animated films such as Dumbo, Sleeping Beauty and Alice in Wonderland
- Sarah Greene presented excerpts from Disney films from Emmen Zoo in the Netherlands on August Bank Holiday show on 31 August including Cinderella, The Rescuers Down Under, and there was a preview of the new, Oscar-winning Beauty and the Beast.
- Sarah Greene also presented the Christmas edition on 27 December with clips from Cinderella, The Little Mermaid, Dumbo and Beauty and the Beast

=== 1993 ===
- The Easter edition was broadcast from Penrhyn Castle on 12 April 1993 hosted by Sarah Greene who presented a magical collection of clips from films such as The Sword in the Stone, The Prince and the Pauper, Alice in Wonderland and The Jungle Book.
- The late May bank holiday edition on 29 May was once again presented by Sarah Greene, presenting clips from films including Song of the South, Lady and the Tramp, Peter Pan and Who Framed Roger Rabbit.
- The August bank holiday edition on 30 August was presented by Mike Smith who takes us on a magic carpet ride to Tunisia pursued by Jafar, the villain of the latest Disney success Aladdin. Plus clips from films such as Robin Hood, Beauty and the Beast and The Little Mermaid.
- On Boxing Day, a special edition was broadcast from EuroDisneyland in Paris, hosted by Sarah Greene featuring clips from Bedknobs and Broomsticks, The Jungle Book and the latest Disney animated feature, Aladdin.

=== 1994 ===
- Sarah Greene presented the Easter edition on 4 April with clips from Disney films both past and present including The Aristocats, Peter Pan, The Sword and the Stone and The Three Musketeers.
- The late May bank holiday edition was presented by Sarah Greene – no further details available.
- The August Bank Holiday edition on 29 August was a spectacular wildlife edition hosted by Sarah Greene including clips from Lady and the Tramp, Homeward Bound, Robin Hood, and the phenomenally successful new Disney animated feature The Lion King. Featuring a special contribution from Johnny Morris.
- The Christmas Eve edition was presented by Michaela Strachan and featured a seasonal journey through the world of movies from Disneyland Paris.

The Disney Channel UK started broadcasting on BSkyB on 1 October 1995 but has never broadcast a similar show.

=== 1995 ===
- For Easter on 17 April, Michaela Strachan presented a special Hollywood edition from Disneyland in California. The extracts featured come from The Aristocats, 101 Dalmatians, The Return of Jafar, Mary Poppins and Basil the Great Mouse Detective.
- The late May Bank Holiday edition on 29 May was presented by Michaela Strachan and included extracts from Pinocchio, The Aristocats, Cinderella, The Sword in the Stone, Hocus Pocus, 101 Dalmatians and Alice in Wonderland.
- The August Bank Holiday edition was presented by Michaela Strachan and focused on the first settlers in America, with extracts from "Pocahontas". Plus "Bambi", "The Lion King", "The Fox and the Hound", and "Peter Pan".
- The Boxing Day 1995 edition was presented from Norway by Michaela Strachan and the selection of extracts included a preview of the computer animation Toy Story, plus The Nightmare Before Christmas and The Santa Clause.

=== 1996 ===
- Michaela Strachan presented an Easter edition on 5 April from Disneyland Paris, with excerpts from Sleeping Beauty, Cinderella, Muppet Treasure Island, plus a Mickey Mouse short and a clip from Toy Story.
- The late May bank holiday edition on 27 May featured Michaela Strachan presenting a special sports edition from Orlando, Florida. Clips included Pocahontas, Toy Story, Mighty Ducks, and Pinocchio.
- The August Bank Holiday edition on 26 August titled 'Summer Disney Time' hosted by Michaela Strachan including extracts from Dumbo, 101 Dalmatians, the new film – The Hunchback of Notre Dame and Mickey in Arabia.
- The Christmas edition was shown on 27 December and Sean Maguire hosted an "Xmas Files" edition from Inverness, and introduces clips from favourite Disney films

=== 1997 ===
- Tim Vincent presented an Easter edition titled 'Easter Disneytime' on 28 March from Disneyland Paris, including excerpts from Alice in Wonderland and Peter Pan.
- The early May Bank Holiday edition on 5 May was titled 'Spring Disneytime' and was hosted by Tim Vincent and included clips from The Lady and the Tramp, Peter Pan and Snow White.
- The May Summer holiday beach and was hosted by Tim Vincent and included clips from Mickey Mouse short, Pinocchio, Jungle 2 Jungle and Snow White.
- The August bank holiday edition on 25 August was titled 'Summer Disneytime' and hosted by Jenny Powell. Clips included Disney's latest film Hercules as well as favourites like Winnie the Pooh, George of the Jungle and the live action 101 Dalmatians.
- A Christmas edition was broadcast on Boxing Day 1997 hosted by Keith Chegwin and Jayne Middlemiss with the help of the comic duo Trevor and Simon who introduce clips from favourite Disney films, including Hercules, George of the Jungle and 101 Dalmatians.

=== 1998 ===
- For the late May Bank Holiday edition broadcast on 25 May, this was a special World Cup edition titled Disney Time: The World at Their Feet and was hosted by England and West Ham defender Rio Ferdinand who teaches a troupe of bored aliens how to perfect their football skills. He also takes a look at some of the greatest moments in World Cup history and introduces clips from Disney films, including Mr Magoo, Bedknobs and Broomsticks, Alice in Wonderland and Peter Pan.
- The August Bank Holiday edition broadcast on 31 August, was the final edition of the show to date and was hosted by Michaela Strachan and David Bellamy who visit London's Kew Gardens for a selection of clips from favourite Disney films, including Pocahontas, Mulan. The Jungle Book and The Little Mermaid. There is also a look at international conservation groups set up by children.

== Miscellaneous ==
"Disney Time" is also a song on Jarvis Cocker's debut solo record, as well as a song on Millencolin's album: Same Old Tunes
