= Ben Sharpsteen =

American film director and animator (1895–1980)

- Born: Benjamin Sharpsteen; November 4, 1895; Tacoma, Washington, U.S.
- Died: December 20, 1980 (aged 85); Calistoga, California, U.S.
- Occupations: Film director, film producer
- Years active: 1920–1980

Benjamin Sharpsteen (November 4, 1895 – December 20, 1980) was an American film director and animator. He is best known for his work at Walt Disney Productions, though he also worked for Fleischer Studios in his early years. He directed 31 films between 1920 and 1980. Sharpsteen created a museum documenting the history of California's first millionaire, Sam Brannan, and the history of the Upper Napa Valley as well as more on Sharpsteen's life and work at the Sharpsteen Museum located in Calistoga, California. He died in Napa County, California.

== Filmography ==
Year	Title	Credits
1937	Snow White and the Seven Dwarfs	Sequence Director
1940	Pinocchio	Supervising Director
1940	Fantasia	Production Supervisor
1941	Dumbo	Supervising Director
1947	Fun and Fancy Free	Production Supervisor
1948	Melody Time	Production Supervisor
1948	Seal Island (Documentary Short)	Production Supervisor
1949	The Adventures of Ichabod and Mr. Toad	Production Supervisor
1950	Cinderella	Production Supervisor
1950	Beaver Valley (Documentary Short)	Production Supervisor
1951	Alice in Wonderland	Production Supervisor
1951	Nature's Half Acre (Documentary Short)	Production Supervisor
1952	The Olympic Elk (Documentary Short)	Production Supervisor
1952	Water Birds (Documentary Short)	Director
1953	Bear Country (Short Documentary)	Associate Producer
1953	The Alaskan Eskimo (Documentary Short)	Associate Producer
1953	Prowlers of the Everglades (Documentary Short)	Associate Producer
1953	The Living Desert (Documentary)	Associate Producer
1954	The Vanishing Prairie (Documentary)	Associate Producer
1954	Siam (Documentary Short)	Producer
1955	Switzerland (Documentary Short)	Director
1955	The African Lion (Documentary)	Associate Producer
1955	Toontown’s Mars	Associate Producer
1956	The Blue Men of Morocco (Documentary Short)	Associate Producer
1956	Secrets of Life (Documentary)	Producer
1956	Sardinia (Documentary Short)	Director
1956	Samoa (Documentary Short)	Director
1956–1957	The Magical World of Disney (TV Series)	Producer - 2 Episodes
1957	Lapland (Documentary Short)	Director
1957	Portugal (Documentary Short)	Producer
1958	Ama Girls (Documentary Short)	Producer
1958	White Wilderness (Documentary)	Producer
1959	Mysteries of the Deep (Documentary Short)	Production Associate
1960	Islands of the Sea (Documentary Short)	Production Associate
1955–1960	The Magical World of Disney (TV Series)	Director - 2 Episodes
1964	The Magical World of Disney (TV Series)	Sequence Director - 1 Episode
1970	Dad... Can I Borrow the Car? (TV Short)	Production Supervisor
1972	The Magical World of Disney (TV Series)	Production Supervisor - 1 Episode
1975	The Best of Walt Disney's True-Life Adventures (Documentary)	Producer
1980	Mickey Mouse Disco (Short)	Director
1984	DTV: Rock, Rhythm & Blues (Video)	Director
1984	DTV: Pop & Rock (Video)	Director
1984	DTV: Golden Oldies (Video)	Director
1985	The Walt Disney Comedy and Magic Revue (Video Short)	Director: Archive Footage
2000	Fantasia 2000	Production Supervisor - Segment "The Sorcerer's Apprentice"
