= N. Paul Kenworthy =

American film director and cinematographer

Norman Paul Kenworthy Jr.
- Born: February 14, 1925; Philadelphia, Pennsylvania
- Died: October 15, 2010 (aged 85); Ventura, California
- Occupation: Cinematographer

Norman Paul Kenworthy Jr. (February 14, 1925 – October 15, 2010) was an American film director and cinematographer, mostly for Disney studio films. As co-inventor of the Snorkel Camera System, a remote-controlled periscope camera, he shared a 1978 non-competitive Academy Award for technical achievement with engineer William Latady.

== Filmography ==
- The Living Desert (1953, "photographed by")
- The Vanishing Prairie (1954, "photographed by")
- Perri (1957, director and "photographed by")
- The Best of Walt Disney's True-Life Adventures (1975, co-cinematographer)
