= Lloyd L. Richardson =

American screenwriter and film director (1915–2002)

Lloyd Richardson (21 April 1915-19 February 2002) was an American film editor who primarily worked with the Walt Disney Company. He has been declared a Disney Legend, and Roy E. Disney said of him: "“Lloyd exemplified the editor as a creative force. He was an original thinker who didn’t just make one cut match another cut, but always considered the whole story.” He was born in Portland, Oregon. He attended Los Angeles City College, and then began working as a runner at Disney after a period of odd jobs during the Great Depression. He retired in 1980, and died February 19, 2002.

== Filmography ==
Year	Title	Position
1948	So Dear to My Heart	editor
1951	Alice in Wonderland (1951 film)	editor
1953	Bear Country (1953 film)	editor
1954	The Vanishing Prairie	editor
1956	Disneyland, U.S.A.	editor
1959	Disneyland '59	editor
1959	Eyes in Outer Space	editor
1959	Donald in Mathmagic Land	editor
1964	Karen (1964 TV series)	editor, 3 episodes
1965	The Ceramic Mural: Modern Use of an Ancient Art	editor
1967	The Legend of the Boy and the Eagle	editor
1969	Hang Your Hat on the Wind	editor
1969	It's Tough to Be a Bird	editor
1970	Dad... Can I Borrow the Car?	editor
1971	The Million Dollar Duck	editor
1971	Bayou Boy	editor
1972	The Magic of Walt Disney World	editor
1975	The Best of Walt Disney's True-Life Adventures	editor
1978	NBC Salutes the 25th Anniversary of the Wonderful World of Disney	editor
1978	Mickey's 50	editor
1979	Cosmic Capers	editor
1980	The Kids Who Knew Too Much	editor
1954-1980	Disney anthology television series	editor, 37 episodes
1989	Paradise (1988 TV series)	editor, 1 episode
1979-1989	Dallas (TV series)	editor, 69 episodes
