= True-Life Adventures =

Nature documentary film series by Disney

- Introductory title card (1952)
- Starring: Winston Hibler (narrator)
- Cinematography: Alfred Milotte (1–3); Norman R. Palmer (2–12); Herb Crisler (3); Lois Crisler (3)
- Edited by: Anthony Gérard (1–11); Norman R. Palmer (2–14); Lloyd L. Richardson (6–9); Jack Astwood (12)
- Music by: Oliver Wallace (1–14); Paul J. Smith (2–12)
- Production company: Walt Disney Productions
- Distributed by: RKO Radio Pictures (1948–1953); Buena Vista Film Distribution Co, Inc. (1953–1960)
- Country: United States
- Language: English

True-Life Adventures is a series of short and full-length nature documentary films released by Walt Disney Productions between 1948 and 1960. The first seven films released were thirty-minute shorts, with the subsequent seven films being full features. The series won eight Academy Awards for the studio, including five for Best Two Reel Live Action Short and three for Best Documentary Feature.

Some of the features were re-edited into educational shorts between 1968 and 1975. The latter year saw the release of The Best of Walt Disney's True-Life Adventures, a compilation film derived from the series.

== Films ==
#	Film name	Type	Date	Educational film
Short films
1	On Seal Island (a.k.a. Seal Island)	Two-reel short	December 21, 1948	
2	In Beaver Valley (a.k.a. Beaver Valley)	Two-reel short	July 19, 1950	
3	Nature's Half Acre	Two-reel short	July 28, 1951	
4	The Olympic Elk	Two-reel short	February 13, 1952	
5	Water Birds	Two-reel short	June 26, 1952	
6	Bear Country	Two-reel short	February 5, 1953	
7	Prowlers of the Everglades	Two-reel short	July 23, 1953	
Full-length feature films
8	The Living Desert	Feature	November 10, 1953	The following educational films were excerpted from The Living Desert: Animals at Home in the Desert (1974); Predators of the Desert (1974); What Is a Desert? (1974)
9	The Vanishing Prairie	Feature	August 17, 1954	The following educational films were excerpted from The Vanishing Prairie: The Buffalo – Majestic Symbol of the Plains (1962); Small Animals of the Plains (1962); Pioneer Trails, Indian Lore and Bird Life of the Plains (1962); Large Animals that Once Roamed the Plains (1962)
10	The African Lion	Feature	September 14, 1955	The following educational films were excerpted from The African Lion: The African Lion and His Realm (1968); Birds, Baboons, and Other Animals – Their Struggle for Survival (1968); Elephants and Hippos in Africa (1968)
11	Secrets of Life	Feature	November 6, 1956	The following educational films were excerpted from Secrets of Life: Secrets of the Ant and Insect World (1960); Secrets of the Bee World (1960); Secrets of the Plant World (1960); Secrets of the Underwater World (1960)
12	Perri ("A True-Life Fantasy")	Feature	August 28, 1957	
13	White Wilderness	Feature	August 12, 1958	The following educational films were excerpted from White Wilderness: The Arctic Region and Its Polar Bears (1964); Large Animals of the Arctic (1964); The Lemmings and Arctic Bird Life (1964)
14	Jungle Cat	Feature	August 10, 1960	The following educational films were excerpted from Jungle Cat: Animals of the South American Jungle (1974); Jungle Cat of the Amazon (1974)

Additional educational shorts edited from two or more films were released under a "Nature's Living Album" banner, including:

- The Weasel Family (1968)
- The Wild Dog Family – The Coyote (1968)
- The Wild Cat Family – The Cougar (1968)
- The Deer Family (1968)
- The Beasts of Burden Family (1970)
- The Bear Family (1970)

On October 8, 1975, Disney theatrically released The Best of Walt Disney's True-Life Adventures, a full-length documentary film derived from 13 True-Life Adventures films. It was written and directed by James Algar and narrated by Winston Hibler.

== Production ==
The films were among the earliest production experience for Roy E. Disney. This series was the launching pad for Disney's then-new distributor, the Buena Vista Film Distribution Company, Inc. Interstitial animated segments are included, and some filmed sequences are set to music. Ub Iwerks blew up the 16 mm film to 35 mm for theatrical projection and provided some special effects.

== Awards ==
The series won eight Academy Awards for the studio including five Best Two Reel Live Action Short awards for Seal Island, In Beaver Valley, Nature's Half Acre, Water Birds, and Bear Country, and three Academy Award for Best Documentary Feature awards for The Living Desert, The Vanishing Prairie and White Wilderness.

== In other media ==
Television episodes from Disney's anthology TV series focus on the films, and it inspired a daily panel comic strip that was distributed from 1955 to 1973 and drawn by George Wheeler. Several of the films were adapted in comic book format as one-shots in Dell Comics' Four Color series.

== Home media ==
=== VHS releases ===
==== Australian & New Zealand ====
- The Living Desert (September 22, 1995)
- The Vanishing Prairie (September 22, 1995)
- Jungle Cat (September 22, 1995)
- Secrets of Life (September 22, 1995)
- The African Lion (September 22, 1995)
- White Wilderness (September 22, 1995)
- Seal Island (March 15, 1996)
- Bear Country (March 15, 1996)
- Water Birds (March 15, 1996)
- The Olympic Elk (March 15, 1996)
- Beaver Valley (March 15, 1996)
- Nature's Half Acre (March 15, 1996)

=== DVD release ===
All of the True-Life Adventures have been released on four double-DVD sets under a "Legacy Collection" banner, which launched December 5, 2006. Roy E. Disney appears in some of the behind-the-scenes material, which includes some visits to Disney's Animal Kingdom.

=== Disney+ ===
Many of the films are hosted on Disney's streaming platform Disney+, although as of November 2026, some had not yet been added to the service in the United States, including Seal Island, Bear Country, and White Wilderness.

== Reception ==
Although critics denounced the series' anthropomorphizing of animals, educators honored the True-Life Adventures films. In 1954, the professional teacher organization Phi Delta Kappa International awarded Walt Disney its Education Award, and the National Education Association honored him with the American Education Award.

== Legacy ==
Animators from Walt Disney Productions used film from the series as reference material for a wide range of animals. During the production of The Rescuers (1977), animator Ollie Johnston cited footage from the series—showing the clumsiness of albatross take-offs and landings—as inspiration for the mice's mode of transportation in the movie.

Masaichi Nagata, the president of the Japanese film studio Daiei Film produced a nature documentary film White Mountains (白い山脈, Shiroi Sanmyaku) in 1957 under the influence of the series.

A 1982 CBC documentary entitled Cruel Camera interviews a cameraman who worked on the series, who said he disliked the inaccuracy of the narration. In a notorious example he discussed, the lemmings' mass suicide in White Wilderness was staged, with the same small group of lemmings repeatedly shoved off a cliffside—rather than hundreds intentionally jumping as stated by the narrator—into Alberta's Bow River, rather than the Arctic Ocean as is depicted. In 2003, the Alaska Department of Fish and Game discussed the lemming-suicide myth and in 2022, business magnate Elon Musk referred to the story after calling for Mickey Mouse to be released into the public domain, tweeting: "Ironic that Disney would disparage an entire class of rodents when their main character is a rodent – jealous maybe?"

In 2007, Disney established a new nature film label called Disneynature, which produces feature films similar to the True-Life Adventures series. On March 20, 2019, Disney acquired 21st Century Fox, including the nature-themed National Geographic Films.

The Disney+ series Behind the Attraction (2021) cites the films as an influence on Walt Disney's decision to create Jungle Cruise as one of Disneyland's first rides.

== See also ==
- List of Disney live-action shorts
- List of Walt Disney Pictures films

=== Documentaries ===
- Circle-Vision 360°
- People & Places
