= Make Mine Music =

1946 animated film by Walt Disney

- Theatrical release poster
- Directed by: Jack Kinney; Clyde Geronimi; Hamilton Luske; Joshua Meador; Robert Cormack
- Story by: James Bodrero; Homer Brightman; Erwin Graham; Eric Gurney; T. Hee; Sylvia Holland; Dick Huemer; Dick Kelsey; Dick Kinney; Jesse Marsh; Tom Oreb; Cap Palmer; Erdman Penner; Dick Shaw; Harry Reeves; John Walbridge; Roy Williams
- Based on: "Casey at the Bat" by Ernest Thayer Peter and the Wolf by Sergei Prokofiev
- Produced by: Walt Disney; Joe Grant
- Starring: Nelson Eddy; Dinah Shore; Benny Goodman; Andrews Sisters; Jerry Colonna; Andy Russell; Sterling Holloway; David Lichine; Tania Riabouchinskaya; Pied Piers; King's Men; Ken Darby's Chorus
- Music by: Eliot Daniel; Ken Darby; Charles Wolcott; Oliver Wallace; Edward Plumb
- Production company: Walt Disney Productions
- Distributed by: RKO Radio Pictures
- Release dates: April 20, 1946 (New York City); August 15, 1946 (United States)
- Running time: 75 minutes
- Country: United States
- Language: English
- Budget: $1.35 million
- Box office: $3.275 million (worldwide rentals)

Make Mine Music is a 1946 American animated musical anthology film produced by Walt Disney and released by RKO Radio Pictures on April 20, 1946.

During World War II, much of Walt Disney's staff was drafted into the army, and those that remained were called upon by the U.S. government to make training and propaganda films. As a result, the studio was littered with unfinished story ideas. In order to keep the feature film division alive during this difficult time, the studio released six package films including this one, made up of various unrelated segments set to music. This is the third package film, following Saludos Amigos and The Three Caballeros. The film was entered into the 1946 Cannes Film Festival.

The film involved 2,500,000 original drawings and cost $350,000 to make; Variety later reported a higher production cost of $1.35million.

== Film segments ==
This particular film has ten such segments.

=== The Martins and the Coys ===
The popular radio vocal group The King's Men sings the story of a Hatfields and McCoys-style feud in the mountains. The feud is broken up when Grace Martin and Henry Coy, two young people from each side, inadvertently fall in love. This segment was later censored from the film's US video release due to objections to the film's depiction of gun violence.

=== Blue Bayou ===
This segment featured animation originally intended for Fantasia using the Claude Debussy musical composition Clair de Lune from Suite bergamasque (conducted by Leopold Stokowski). It featured two egrets flying through the Everglades on a moonlit night. However, by the time Make Mine Music was released Clair de Lune was replaced by the new song Blue Bayou, performed by the Ken Darby Singers. However, the original version of the segment still survives.

=== All the Cats Join In ===
This segment was one of two sections in which Benny Goodman and his Orchestra contributed. Their music played over visuals drawn by an animator's pencil as the action occurred. The scene portrayed hepcats of the 1940s, being swept away by popular music. This segment features some mild female nudity that was edited out in both the US and UK DVD releases, although the film's Japanese home video releases features it intact and uncensored.

=== Without You ===
This segment is a ballad of lost love, sung by Andy Russell.

=== Casey at the Bat ===
This segment featured Jerry Colonna, reciting the poem also titled "Casey at the Bat" by Ernest Thayer, about the arrogant ballplayer whose cockiness was his undoing. The setting is 1902, in the town of Mudville. A few moments are exaggerated or altered and music is added. A sequel film to this segment titled Casey Bats Again was released on June 18, 1954 as a standalone theatrical short.

=== Two Silhouettes ===
This segment featured two rotoscoped live-action ballet dancers, David Lichine and Tania Riabouchinskaya, moving in silhouette with animated backgrounds and characters. The dancers are accompanied by two putti, also in silhouette. Dinah Shore sang the title song.

=== Peter and the Wolf ===
The segment "Peter and the Wolf" is an animated dramatization of the 1936 musical composition by Sergei Prokofiev, with narration by actor Sterling Holloway. A Russian boy named Peter sets off into the forest to hunt the wolf with his animal friends: a bird named Sascha, a duck named Sonia, and a cat named Ivan. Just like in Prokofiev's piece, each character is represented with a specific musical accompaniment: Peter by the String Quartet, Sascha by the Flute, Sonia by the Oboe, Ivan by the Clarinet, Grandpapa by the Bassoon, the Hunters through their gunfire by the Kettledrums, and the evil Wolf primarily by horns and cymbals.

=== After You've Gone ===
This segment again featured Benny Goodman and The Goodman Quartet (Teddy Wilson, Cozy Cole and Sid Weiss) as six anthropomorphized instruments (Piano, Bass, Snare and bass Drums, Cymbal and Clarinet) who paraded through a musical playground.

=== Johnnie Fedora and Alice Bluebonnet ===
This segment told the romantic story of two hats who fell in love in a department store window in New York City. When Alice Bluebonnet was sold, Johnnie Fedora devoted himself to finding her again. They eventually, by pure chance, meet up again and live happily ever after together, side by side. The Andrews Sisters provided the vocals. Like the other segments, it was later released theatrically. It was released as such on May 21, 1954.

=== Finale: The Whale Who Wanted to Sing at the Met ===
The final segment, the finale of the film, is a bittersweet story about a sperm whale (named Willie) with incredible musical talent and his dreams of singing grand opera. A rumor is spread throughout the city about an operatic whale, but is seemingly disproven, therefore the short-sighted impresario Tetti-Tatti believes that the whale has swallowed an opera singer. He concludes this after studying the story of Jonah.

Tetti-Tatti sets out to "rescue" his non-existent quarry, the newspapers announcing that he was going to sea. Whitey, Willie's seagull friend, excitedly brings Willie the newspaper, all of his friends believing that this is his big chance, so he goes out to meet the boat and sing for Tetti-Tatti. He finds them, and upon hearing Willie sing, Tetti-Tatti comes to believe that Willie has swallowed not one, but three singers (due to his having three uvulas, each with a different voice range; tenor, baritone and bass), and chases him with a harpoon on a boat with three crewmen. Upon hearing the whale sing, the crewmen try to stop the stubborn and deluded Tetti-Tatti from killing the whale, as they want to continue listening to him sing, even to the point of pinning Tetti-Tatti down by sitting on him. A montage then follows of what would be Willie's future career in performing opera on the stage of the Met, with Tetti-Tatti shown to have finally been convinced. In the end, reality strikes when Tetti-Tatti succeeds in harpooning and killing Willie which causes the three sailors to beat him up afterwards, but the narrator then explains that Willie's voice (now in a thousand, each more golden than before) will sing on in heaven, ironically still achieving his dream after all; the final shot is of the Pearly gates with a "sold out" sign. Nelson Eddy narrated and performed all the voices in this segment. As Willie the Whale, Eddy sang, among others, Shortnin' Bread, "Largo al factotum" from The Barber of Seville, all three male voices in the first part of the Sextet from Donizetti's opera, Lucia di Lammermoor, and Mag der Himmel Euch Verbegen from Friedrich Wilhelm Riese's opera Martha.

As the curtains close, the film ends.

== Cast ==
Actor	Role(s)
Nelson Eddy	Narrator; characters (The Whale Who Wanted to Sing at the Met)
Dinah Shore	Singer (Two Silhouettes)
Benny Goodman	Musician (All the Cats Join In/After You've Gone)
The Andrews Sisters	Singers (Johnnie Fedora and Alice Bluebonnet)
Jerry Colonna	Narrator (Casey at the Bat)
Sterling Holloway	Narrator (Peter and the Wolf)
Andy Russell	Singer (Without You)
David Lichine	Dancer (Two Silhouettes)
Tania Riabouchinskaya	Dancer (Two Silhouettes)
The Pied Pipers	Singers (All the Cats Join In)
The King's Men	Singers (The Martins and the Coys)
The Ken Darby Singers	Singers (Blue Bayou)

== Music ==
Make Mine Music

Film score by Eliot Daniel, Ken Darby, Charles Wolcott, Oliver Wallace and Edward Plumb
- Released: 1946
- Label: Disneyland Records

No.	Title	Writer(s)	Performer(s)	Length
1.	"Make Mine Music"	Ken Darby & Eliot Daniel	Disney Studio Chorus
2.	"The Martins and the Coys"	Al Cameron & Ted Weems	The King's Men
3.	"Blue Bayou"	Bobby Worth & Ray Gilbert	The Ken Darby Singers
4.	"All the Cats Join In"	Alec Wilder & Ray Gilbert	Benny Goodman and His Orchestra
5.	"Without You"	Ray Gilbert	Andy Russell
6.	"Casey at the Bat"	Ray Gilbert, Ken Darby & Eliot Daniel	Jerry Colonna
7.	"Two Silhouettes"	Charles Wolcott & Ray Gilbert	Dinah Shore
8.	"Peter and the Wolf"	Sergei Prokofiev	Sterling Holloway
9.	"After You've Gone"	Turner Layton & Henry Creamer	Benny Goodman & The Goodman Quartet
10.	"Johnnie Fedora and Alice Bluebonnet"	Allie Wrubel & Ray Gilbert	The Andrews Sisters
11.	"The Whale Who Wanted to Sing At the Met"	Ken Darby	Nelson Eddy

== Release ==
Make Mine Music was initially released in theaters in 1946. Like many other package features of the 1940s, it was never given a wide theatrical reissue. Instead, its distinct segments were separated and released as separate short films or used as segments in Disney television programmes.

=== Home media ===
Make Mine Music was originally released on home video in Japan on October 21, 1985. All of its segments (except for Without You and The Martins and the Coys) had been released on home video in the US since they were shown on The Magical World of Disney television series and/or released only as shorts.

Casey at the Bat was featured on the VHS release of Disney's Tall Tales in 1985.

Blue Bayou was featured on the Disney's Greatest Lullabies Part Two VHS.

All the Cats Join In, Two Silhouettes, After You've Gone and The Whale Who Wanted To Sing At The Met (along with Stokowski's original recording of Claire de Lune) were featured on the VHS compilation The Wonderful World of Disney: Music for Everybody in 1986.

Peter and the Wolf was first released on the Storybook Classics VHS in 1982 and eventually joined the Walt Disney Mini Classics series (along with Willie the Operatic Whale) and the Favorite Stories collection.

Johnnie Fedora and Alice Bluebonnet was released on laserdisc in 1999 as part of The Disneyland Anthology 3 disc box-set, as it was a segment of the Adventures in Fantasy episode on side 5.

The actual film was released on VHS and DVD on June 6, 2000 under the Walt Disney Gold Classic Collection line. They edited this release to remove The Martins and the Coys, which contained comic gunplay that they deemed not suitable for children, as well as editing out the sexualized imagery in All the Cats Join In.

Outside of North America, Make Mine Music has been largely unavailable on DVD and VHS. It has, however, been available in Scandinavia on both VHS (1983) and DVD (2006) and since 2013 on DVD in the UK (unrestored, albeit with The Martins and the Coys intact, but still editing out the sexualized imagery in All the Cats Join In). This and The Adventures of Ichabod and Mr. Toad are the only two major Disney animated films never to see a release on Region 4 DVD in Australia; however, the latter did get a VHS release.

As of 2021, Make Mine Music is the only package film from the animation studio that is not available on Disney+.

Disney released Make Mine Music and Melody Time for the first time ever on Blu-ray, through their Disney Movie Club website on November 2, 2021. Despite explicit reports by Disney's customer service confirming this release would be uncut and mentioning that the release would include all ten musical segments, the actual discs contained the 2000 censored version of the film.

== Reception ==
=== Box office ===
The film grossed $70,000 in its first week at the Globe Theatre in New York City. It went on to earn $2,085,000 in theatrical rentals from the United States and Canada. Cumulatively, it earned $3,275,000 in worldwide rentals.

=== Critical response ===
Abel Green of Variety stated that "the animation, color and music, the swing versus symph, and the imagination, execution and delineation—that this Disney feature (two years in the making) may command widest attention yet. The blend of cartoon with human action has been evidenced before; here Disney has retained all his characters in their basic art form, but endowed them with human qualities, voices and treatments, which is another step forward in the field where cartoons graduate into the field of the classics." Harrison's Reports felt that some of the shorts were "more entertaining than others, but all are good, and each has something to please movie-goers of all tastes and ages. It is a delightful blend of comedy, music, pathos, animation, and color, given a most imaginative treatment."

Bosley Crowther, reviewing for The New York Times, praised the film as "a brilliant abstraction wherein fanciful musical instruments dance gayly on sliding color disks, sets of romping fingers race blithely down tapes of piano keys and musical notes fly wildly through the multi-hued atmosphere—all to the tingling accompaniment of Benny Goodman's quartet playing the ancient and melodious torch song, "After You're Gone". Color, form and music blend dynamically in this bit, and a rich stimulant of sensuous rhythm is excitingly achieved." Edwin Schallert of the Los Angeles Times wrote that Make Mine Music was "a picture of much inventiveness and imagination. The lighter the picture is, the more is its excellence demonstrated, it might be noted. And while music is the keynote of the production, it ranges well into comedy, and plentifully into swing."

The film holds a 64% rating on Rotten Tomatoes, with an average score of 6.5/10. The site's critical consensus reads, "This collection of musical-themed shorts doesn't reach the artistic heights of Fantasia, but it's well animated and mostly good fun."

== See also ==
- 1946 in film
- List of American films of 1946
- List of Walt Disney Pictures films
- List of Disney theatrical animated features
- List of animated feature films of the 1940s
- List of highest-grossing animated films
- List of package films
- Melody Time, similar format to Make Mine Music
