= Men Against the Arctic =

1955 film

- Directed by: Winston Hibler
- Written by: Winston Hibler
- Produced by: Walt Disney; Ben Sharpsteen
- Starring: Winston Hibler
- Narrated by: Winston Hibler
- Cinematography: William Fortin; Elmo G. Jones
- Edited by: Grant K. Smith
- Music by: Oliver Wallace
- Production company: Walt Disney Productions
- Distributed by: Buena Vista Distribution Co. Inc.
- Release date: December 21, 1955
- Running time: 30 minutes
- Country: United States
- Language: English

Men Against the Arctic is a 1955 American short documentary film directed by Winston Hibler. It was part of Disney's People & Places series. It won an Oscar at the 28th Academy Awards in 1956 for Documentary Short Subject. It was also entered into the 6th Berlin International Film Festival.

== Overview ==
The short film describes the icebreaker ships of the era, used to break through thick pack ice off the coast of Greenland. The narrator describes the processes through which helicopters perform reconnaissance missions to avoid the icebreakers encountering large icebergs and other obstacles. The difficulty in making large deliveries by ship to base stations, such as Thule, is shown through the film's dramatic filmography of Arctic glaciers and icebergs, highlighting too the remote nature of the work.

== Cast ==
- Winston Hibler as Narrator (voice)
