= Jungle Cat (film) =

- Official theatrical poster
- Directed by: James Algar
- Written by: James Algar
- Produced by: Ben Sharpsteen; Walt Disney
- Narrated by: Winston Hibler
- Cinematography: Lloyd Beebe; James R. Simon; Hugh A. Wilmar
- Edited by: Norman R. Palmer
- Music by: Oliver Wallace
- Production company: Walt Disney Productions
- Distributed by: Buena Vista Distribution
- Release dates: June 1960 (Berlin); August 10, 1960 (US)
- Running time: 70 minutes
- Country: United States
- Language: English
- Box office: $2.3 million (US and Canadian rentals)

Jungle Cat is a 1960 American documentary film written and directed by James Algar. The documentary chronicles the life of a female jaguar in the South American jungle. The film was released on August 10, 1960, and was the last of Walt Disney Productions' True-Life Adventures series of documentary feature films.

== Synopsis ==
An adventure to Brazil to discover the supreme ruler of the Amazon jungle: the jaguar. The film offers an intimate glimpse into the lives of a jaguar family in life-and-death struggles with a caiman, a peccary, a pirarucu, and an anaconda.

== Release ==
The film was shown during the 10th Berlin International Film Festival in June 1960 and was one of a few to also be screened in East Berlin.

== Reception ==
Howard Thompson of The New York Times wrote: "As written and directed by James Algar, this is one of Mr. Disney's best—intimate, tasteful, strong and matter-of-fact". Variety stated: "Somewhat less astonishing, considerably less amusing, but equally as meticulous and painstakingly filmed as Walt Disney's previous true-life adventure pieces, 'Jungle Cat' pokes around in the lush rain forests of Brazil and comes up with some splendidly photographed shots of wildlife in its best survival-of-the-fittest form". Frank Mulcahy of the Los Angeles Times called the film "a fascinating study of 'the greatest hunter of all cats', the jaguar ... Like all films in this particular Disney series, it is beautifully photographed in Technicolor and shows every evidence of the painstaking work required to produce such remarkable footage". The Monthly Film Bulletin said: "The detail of the film's reportage, and its photographic magnificence, are the more remarkable considering the conditions under which it must have been made ... The whimsy makes the film doubly suitable for children. But one still deplores the over-joviality of a commentary which noisily relishes the prospect of animals killing and eating one another—as when a jaguar, disappointed in some victim, casts around for another just as a wild pig trots into sight. 'Never mind', says the commentator, 'here comes a nice pork chop on the hoof!'"
