= Prowlers of the Everglades =

- Directed by: James Algar
- Written by: James Algar
- Produced by: Ben Sharpsteen; Walt Disney
- Narrated by: Winston Hibler
- Cinematography: Alfred Milotte
- Edited by: Anthony Gérard
- Music by: Paul Smith
- Production company: Walt Disney Productions
- Distributed by: RKO Radio Pictures
- Release date: July 23, 1953
- Running time: 32 minutes
- Country: United States
- Language: English

Prowlers of the Everglades is a 1953 American short documentary film directed by James Algar. The film was produced by Ben Sharpsteen as part of the True-Life Adventures series of nature documentaries. It was shot in Technicolor by Alfred Milotte and his wife Elma, who were on assignment for nearly a year, making film reports on ever aspect of the Everglades. This would also be the last of the True-Life Adventure films to be distributed by RKO Radio Pictures before Walt Disney would take his own distribution company Buena Vista International.

== Summary ==
A photographic study of the wildlife of the Florida Everglades describes the habits of the many birds found in the swamplands and explains that the alligator rules over the area, devouring all varieties of wildlife with impartiality.

== Cast ==
- Winston Hibler as Narrator
