= James Algar =

American film director (1912–1998)

- Born: June 11, 1912; Modesto, California, United States
- Died: February 26, 1998 (aged 85); Carmel, California, United States
- Occupations: Film director, animator, screenwriter, film producer
- Years active: 1934–1977

James Algar (June 11, 1912 – February 26, 1998) was an American film director, animator, screenwriter, and producer. He worked at Walt Disney Productions for 43 years and received the Disney Legends award in 1998. He was born in Modesto, California and died in Carmel, California.

== Controversy ==
In 1958, Algar directed an Oscar-winning documentary White Wilderness, which contains a scene that supposedly depicts a mass lemming migration, and ends with the lemmings leaping into the Arctic Ocean. In 1982, the CBC Television news magazine program The Fifth Estate broadcast a documentary about animal cruelty in Hollywood called Cruel Camera, focusing on White Wilderness, as well as the television program Wild Kingdom. The host of the CBC program, Bob McKeown, discovered that the lemming scene was actually filmed at the Bow River near Canmore, Alberta, and further that the same small group of lemmings was transported to the location, jostled on turntables, and repeatedly shoved off a cliff to imply mass suicide.

McKeown interviewed a lemming expert, who claimed that the particular species of lemming shown in the film is not known to migrate, much less commit mass suicide.

== Selected filmography ==
- Snow White and the Seven Dwarfs (1937 - animator)
- Fantasia (1940 – director)
- Bambi (1942 - director)
- Victory Through Air Power (1943 – director)
- Seal Island (1948 – director)
- The Adventures of Ichabod and Mr. Toad (1949 – director) (The Wind in the Willows segment)
- In Beaver Valley (1950 – director)
- Nature's Half Acre (1951 – director)
- The Olympic Elk (1952 – director and writer)
- Bear Country (1953 – director and writer)
- Prowlers of the Everglades (1953 – director and writer)
- The Living Desert (1953 – director and writer)
- The Vanishing Prairie (1954 – director and writer)
- The African Lion (1955 - director and writer)
- Secrets of Life (1956 – director and writer)
- White Wilderness (1958 – director and writer)
- Grand Canyon (1958 – director)
- Jungle Cat (1960 – director and writer)
- Ten Who Dared (1960 – producer)
- The Legend of Lobo (1962 – director, producer and writer)
- The Incredible Journey (1963 – writer)
- The Gnome-Mobile (1967 – producer)
- One Day on Beetle Rock (1967 – producer)
- Bayou Boy (1971 – producer)
- Mountain Born (1972 – director)
- The Secret of the Pond (1975 – producer)
- The Best of Walt Disney's True-Life Adventures (1975 – director, producer and writer)
- Fantasia 2000 (1999 – director)
