= The Olympic Elk =

- Directed by: James Algar
- Written by: Winston Hibler; Ted Sears; James Algar
- Produced by: Walt Disney
- Narrated by: Winston Hibler
- Cinematography: Herb Crisler; Lois Crisler
- Edited by: Anthony Gérard
- Music by: Paul Smith
- Production company: Walt Disney Productions
- Distributed by: RKO Radio Pictures
- Release date: February 13, 1952
- Running time: 27 minutes
- Country: United States
- Language: English

The Olympic Elk is a 1952 American short documentary film directed by James Algar and produced by Walt Disney as part of the True-Life Adventures series of nature documentaries.

== Summary ==
A photographic study of the Olympic elk which abound on the Olympic Peninsula in Washington describes the life of the herd in winter quarters in the rain forest; the trek to summer feeding grounds; and the placid summer existence of the herd which culminates in the September mating season.

== Cast ==
- Winston Hibler as Narrator
