= Grand Canyon (1958 film) =

Short documentary film

- Directed by: James Algar
- Produced by: Ernst A. Heiniger; Walt Disney
- Cinematography: Ernst A. Heiniger
- Edited by: Norman R. Palmer
- Music by: Ferde Grofé
- Production company: Walt Disney Productions
- Distributed by: Buena Vista Distribution
- Release date: December 17, 1958
- Running time: 29 minutes
- Country: United States
- Language: English

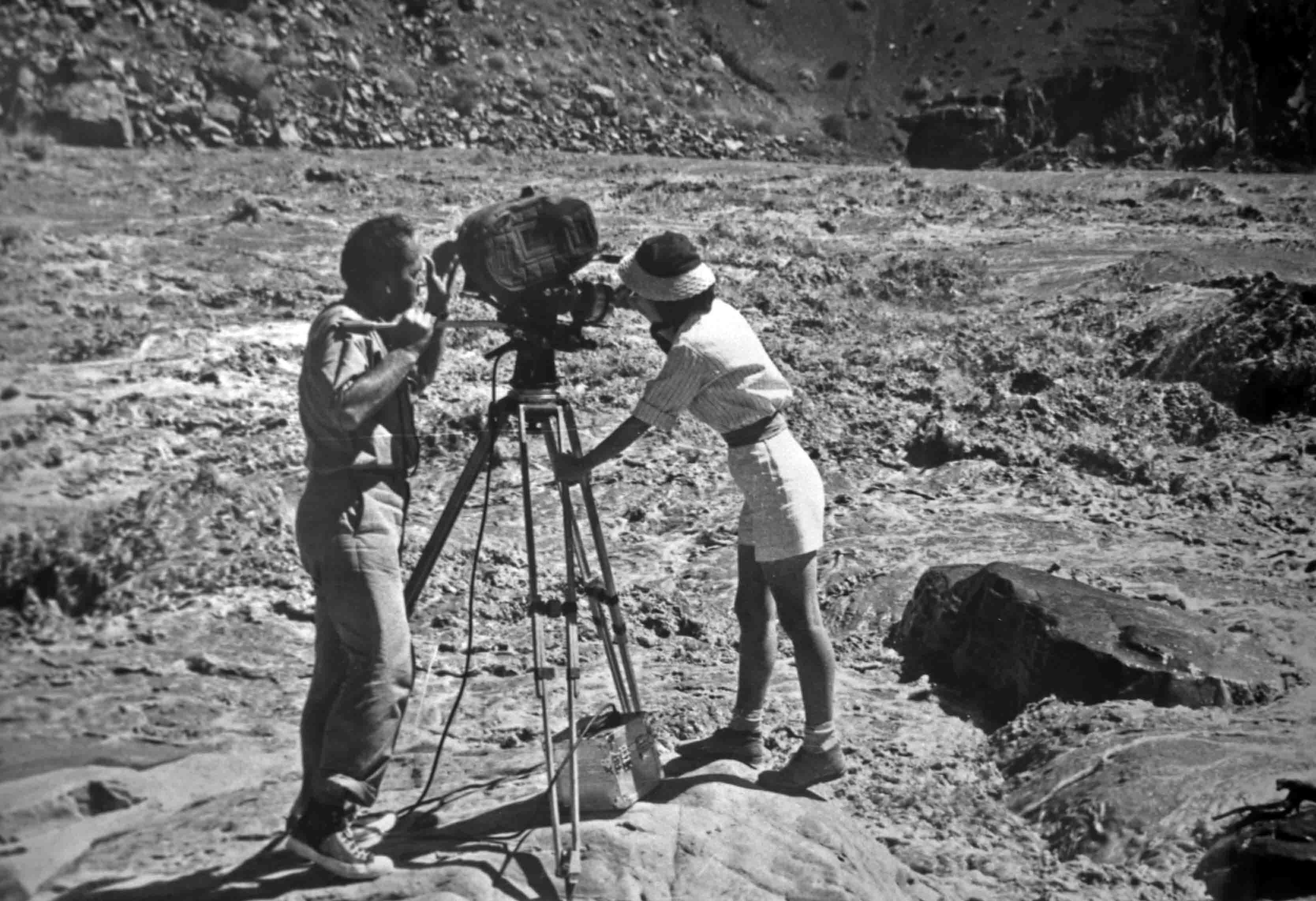
Ernst and Jeanne Heiniger at Hance Rapids, Grand Canyon National Park, April 1958

Grand Canyon is a 1958 American short documentary film directed by James Algar and produced by Walt Disney Productions.

== Production ==
The film producer was Ernst Heiniger, assisted by his wife Jeanne. It was shown as a supplement during Sleeping Beauty's initial run.

== Reception and legacy ==
The short won an Oscar at the 31st Academy Awards in 1959 for Best Short Subject (Live Action). It is also included as a bonus feature on the 1997 laserdisc, 2003 DVD, and 2008 DVD & Blu-ray releases of Sleeping Beauty.

== Summary ==
According to the opening credits, Grand Canyon is "a pictorial interpretation of Ferde Grofé's Grand Canyon Suite", much as the animated segments in Fantasia are pictorial representations of music, and the film is strongly related to its soundtrack. Grand Canyon is one of Walt Disney's more unconventional and experimental works, as it has musical accompaniment, but no dialogue or narration.
