= Winston Hibler =

American screenwriter (1910–1976)

- Born: Winston Murray Hunt Hibler; October 8, 1910; Harrisburg, Pennsylvania, U.S.
- Died: August 8, 1976 (aged 65); Burbank, California, U.S.
- Occupations: Screenwriter, film producer, film director
- Years active: 1942–1976
- Spouse: Dottie Johnson (m. 1930–1976)
- Children: 3

Winston Murray Hunt Hibler (October 8, 1910 – August 8, 1976) was an American screenwriter, film producer, director and narrator associated with Walt Disney Studios. He was best known as being the narrator of the True-Life Adventures nature documentary films.

== Biography and career ==
Hibler was born in Harrisburg, Pennsylvania on October 10, 1910. He was the youngest child of Christopher Hibler and Louise Eisenbeis.

He wanted to be an actor in New York at the age of 12. In 1930, he graduated from the American Academy of Dramatic Arts and performed on Broadway, in In the Best of Families. Later in the same year, he married Dottie Johnson, with whom he had three children.

A year later, he moved to Hollywood to pursue his career on Broadway. He appeared in a small role in The Last Days of Pompeii. Later, he took up freelance writing for magazines and radio to help supplement his income.

In 1942, Hibler joined Walt Disney Productions as a camera operator. Then later on, he worked as a technical director for the U.S. Army training films. As a songwriter, Hibler contributed lyrics with Ted Sears, who wrote songs for some musical films, like "Following the Leader" from Peter Pan, and "I Wonder" from Sleeping Beauty. Hibler also performed voice-over roles in documentary films, and in some series such as True-Life Adventures and People and Places.

In 1961, Hibler produced his feature film, Nikki, Wild Dog of the North. Later in 1963, Hibler and his wife moved to Glendale, California.

He died on August 8, 1976, in Burbank, just three years before his last release, The Black Hole.

He was posthumously awarded the title of Disney Legend in 1992.

== Select filmography ==
=== Narrator ===
- Seal Island (1948)
- In Beaver Valley (1950)
- Nature's Half Acre (1951)
- Water Birds (1952)
- The Living Desert (1953)
- Bear Country (1953)
- Prowlers of the Everglades (1953)
- The Vanishing Prairie (1954)
- The African Lion (1955)
- Secrets of Life (1956)
- Perri (1957)
- White Wilderness (1958)
- Jungle Cat (1960)
- Pablo and the Dancing Chihuahua (1968)
- King of the Grizzlies (1970)
- The Best of Walt Disney's True-Life Adventures (1975)

=== Screenwriter ===
- Melody Time (1948) (Johnny Appleseed segment)
- The Adventures of Ichabod and Mr. Toad (1949) (both The Wind in the Willows and The Legend of Sleepy Hollow segments)
- Cinderella (1950)
- Alice in Wonderland (1951)
- Peter Pan (1953)
- The Living Desert (1953)
- Ben and Me (1953) (Story adaptation)
- The Vanishing Prairie (1954)
- Perri (1957)
- Sleeping Beauty (1959)
- Nikki, Wild Dog of the North (1961)
- Winnie the Pooh and the Blustery Day (1968) (Story supervisor)
- The Best of Walt Disney's True-Life Adventures (1975)
- The Many Adventures of Winnie the Pooh (1977) (Story supervisor (Winnie the Pooh and the Blustery Day segment))

=== Director ===
- Men Against the Arctic (1955)
- Lefty, the Dingaling Lynx (1971)

=== Producer ===
- Nikki, Wild Dog of the North (1961)
- Follow Me, Boys! (1966)
- Pablo and the Dancing Chihuahua (1968)
- The Aristocats (1970)
- The Castaway Cowboy (1974)
- The Bears and I (1974)
- The Island at the Top of the World (1974)

== Recognition ==
=== Awards and nominations ===
- 1951, Hugo Award co-nomination for 'Best Dramatic Presentation' for Cinderella (1950)
- 1956, won Berlin International Film Festival 'Golden Plaque' for Men Against the Arctic (1955)
- 1959, Grammy Award co-nomination for 'Best Soundtrack Album, Original Cast – Motion Picture or Television' for Sleeping Beauty (1959)
