= The Alaskan Eskimo =

1953 film

- Directed by: James Algar
- Written by: Winston Hibler; Ted Sears
- Produced by: Walt Disney
- Narrated by: Winston Hibler
- Cinematography: Alfred Milotte
- Music by: Oliver Wallace
- Production company: Walt Disney Productions
- Distributed by: RKO Radio Pictures
- Release date: February 18, 1953
- Running time: 27 minutes
- Country: United States
- Language: English

The Alaskan Eskimo is a 1953 American short documentary film produced by Walt Disney. It was the initial film in Disney's People & Places series. In 1954, it won an Oscar for Documentary Short Subject at the 26th Academy Awards.
