= Bear Country (film) =

1953 film

- Theatrical release poster
- Directed by: James Algar
- Written by: James Algar
- Produced by: Ben Sharpsteen; Walt Disney
- Narrated by: Winston Hibler
- Edited by: Lloyd L. Richardson
- Music by: Paul J. Smith
- Production company: Walt Disney Productions
- Distributed by: RKO Radio Pictures
- Release date: February 5, 1953; (with Peter Pan)
- Running time: 33 minutes
- Country: United States
- Language: English

Bear Country is a 1953 American short documentary film directed by James Algar. It won an Oscar at the 26th Academy Awards in 1954 for Best Short Subject (Two-Reel). The film was produced by Walt Disney as part of the True-Life Adventures series of nature documentaries, and played with Peter Pan during its original theatrical run.

== Cast ==
- Winston Hibler as Narrator

== Reception ==
Bosley Crowther of The New York Times wrote that the film "follows in the excellent series of nature films that have been produced by the Disney studio, such as Seal Island and Water Birds".

Variety called it "one of the more delightful True-Life Adventure documentaries in the Walt Disney series ... calculated to enchant viewers of all ages".

The Monthly Film Bulletin wrote: "As usual in this series, the material itself is pleasantly photographed and has considerable interest. This is vitiated, however, by the irritatingly facetious tone of the commentary and by the apparent determination to make the bears appear as 'human' as possible—the set-piece, in this case, is a scene of the bears laboriously scratching themselves, to a characteristic musical accompaniment".
