= The Living Desert =

1953 documentary film by James Algar

- Film poster for the double-feature release of The Living Desert and The Vanishing Prairie.
- Directed by: James Algar
- Written by: James Algar; Winston Hibler; Jack Moffitt; Ted Sears
- Produced by: Ben Sharpsteen; Walt Disney
- Narrated by: Winston Hibler
- Cinematography: Robert H. Crandall; N. Paul Kenworthy
- Edited by: Norman R. Palmer
- Music by: Paul J. Smith
- Production company: Walt Disney Productions
- Distributed by: Buena Vista Distribution
- Release date: November 9, 1953
- Running time: 69 minutes
- Country: United States
- Language: English
- Budget: $300,000
- Box office: $2.6 million (US/Canada rentals)

The Living Desert is a 1953 American nature documentary film that shows the everyday lives of the animals of the desert of the Southwestern United States. The film was written by James Algar, Winston Hibler, Jack Moffitt (uncredited), and Ted Sears. It was directed by Algar, with Hibler as the narrator and was filmed in Tucson, Arizona. The film won the 1953 Oscar for Best Documentary.

== Production ==
The Living Desert was the first feature-length film in Disney's True-Life Adventures series of documentaries focusing on zoological studies; the previous films in the series, including the Oscar-winning Seal Island, were short subjects.

The documentary was filmed in Tucson, Arizona. Most of the wildlife shown in the film was donated to what would soon become the Arizona-Sonora Desert Museum.

The film was inspired by 10 minutes of footage shot by N. Paul Kenworthy, a doctoral student at the University of California at Los Angeles. Kenworthy's footage of a battle between a tarantula and a wasp intrigued Disney, who funded a feature-length production following the lives of diverse desert species. Disney was highly supportive of Kenworthy's work and its impact on nonfiction filmmaking: "This is where we can tell a real, sustained story for the first time in these nature pictures".

== Release ==
Prior to the production of The Living Desert, Disney was releasing his films through RKO Radio Pictures, but due to a long-frayed relation with the studio, which had little enthusiasm for the producer's documentary releases, Disney opted to sever his relation with RKO and create his own distribution subsidiary – Buena Vista Distribution, which he named after the street where his office was located. Some pre-existing contracts between RKO and Disney continued until the animated short In the Bag (1956).

The film had its world premiere on November 9, 1953 at the Sutton theatre in New York City. It was packaged with two shorts; the animated short Ben and Me and the live action short Stormy, the Thoroughbred.

The Living Desert received some criticism for bringing unsubtle humor to its scenes of desert life – Bosley Crowther of The New York Times called Disney to task for adding jokey musical effects to several of the film's scenes, including hoedown music for a sequence involving a scorpion mating dance. Nonetheless, the film was a commercial success: the $300,000 production earned $4,000,000 at the box office.

The film was very popular in Japan surpassing Gone With the Wind as the highest-grossing film of all time with a gross of over $800,000.

== Honors ==
The Academy Award that Disney earned for The Living Desert helped the producer make history as the individual with the most Oscar wins in a single year. At the 26th Academy Awards, in addition to winning the Best Documentary Feature Oscar, Disney also won the Academy Award for Best Animated Short Film for Toot, Whistle, Plunk and Boom, the Academy Award for Best Documentary (Short Subject) for The Alaskan Eskimo and the Academy Award for Best Short Subject (Two-Reel) for Bear Country.

In addition to its Oscar, the film also won the International Prize at the 1954 Cannes Film Festival, an award at the Berlin Film Festival and a special achievement award from the Golden Globe Awards. In 2000, the film was selected for preservation in the United States National Film Registry by the Library of Congress as being "culturally, historically, or aesthetically significant".

== Home media ==
The film had its first home media release on VHS and was also featured in the 2006 DVD Walt Disney Legacy Collection Volume 2: Lands of Exploration. It was also later made available to stream on Disney+.
