= White Wilderness (film) =

1958 film directed by James Algar

- Official theatrical poster
- Directed by: James Algar
- Written by: James Algar
- Produced by: Ben Sharpsteen, Walt Disney
- Narrated by: Winston Hibler
- Edited by: Norman R. Palmer
- Music by: Oliver Wallace
- Production company: Walt Disney Productions
- Distributed by: Buena Vista Distribution
- Release date: August 12, 1958
- Running time: 72 minutes
- Countries: United States; Canada
- Language: English
- Box office: $1.8 million (est. US/Canada rentals)

White Wilderness is a 1958 pseudo-documentary film produced by Walt Disney Productions as part of its True-Life Adventure series. It is noted for its propagation of the myth of lemming mass suicide.

The film was directed by James Algar and narrated by Winston Hibler. It was filmed on location in Canada over the course of three years. It won the Academy Award for Best Documentary Feature and the Golden Bear for Best Documentary at the 1959 Berlin Film Festival, and was also nominated for the Academy Award for Music Score of a Dramatic or Comedy Picture.

== Reception ==
Howard Thompson of The New York Times wrote: "Mr. Disney has assembled a fine, often fascinating color documentary on animal life in the North American Arctic". Geoffrey Warren of the Los Angeles Times stated: "Walt Disney has turned again to Nature for adventure and profit. With White Wilderness the master of unusual entertainment has struck pure gold, for this is probably the best of his many true-to-life films". Variety called the film "a fascinating screen experience. Filmed in awesome detail in the icy wastes of the Arctic, where struggle for existence is savage and cruel, this feature is one of the most spectacular of Walt Disney's 'True-Life Adventure' series, and as such can expect handsome returns from its particular market". Harrison's Reports declared: "From the opening to the closing scenes, one is held enthralled by the truly remarkable shots of polar region wild life, both large and small, made all the more interesting by the fine Technicolor photography, the clever editing and the appropriate background music, which heighten both the comic and dramatic aspects of the different scenes". The Monthly Film Bulletin wrote: "The familiar music score, production tricks, anthropomorphic humours and human-angle narration are again in evidence. The basic material, however, remains enthralling; in the case of lemmings and wolverines possibly unique".

== Controversy ==
White Wilderness contains a now-infamous scene that supposedly depicts a mass lemming migration, ending with hundreds leaping into the Arctic Ocean. The narrator of the film states that the lemmings are likely not committing suicide, but rather are in the course of migrating, and upon encountering a body of water are attempting to cross it. If the body of water the lemmings encounter is too wide, they can suffer exhaustion and drown as a result.

In 1982, the CBC Television news magazine program The Fifth Estate broadcast a documentary about animal cruelty in Hollywood called Cruel Camera, focusing on White Wilderness, as well as the television program Wild Kingdom. The host of the CBC program, Bob McKeown, discovered that the lemming scene was actually filmed at the Bow River near Canmore, Alberta, and that the same small group of lemmings was transported to the location, jostled on turntables, and repeatedly shoved off a cliff to imply mass suicide. According to a lemming expert, the particular species of lemming is not known to migrate, much less commit mass suicide. Additionally, McKeown revealed that footage of a polar bear cub falling down an Arctic ice slope was really filmed in a Calgary film studio.

Wildlife photographer and filmmaker James R. Simon, who worked freelance for Disney on numerous True-Life Adventure films, is credited as being the person responsible for staging the lemming sequence. The Walt Disney Family Museum maintains that Simon committed the act without the knowledge or approval of Walt Disney or anyone else at the Disney studio.

== See also ==
- List of American films of 1958
