= Paul Smith (composer) =

American film composer, violinist, conductor (1906–1985)

- Born: Paul J. Smith; October 30, 1906; Calumet, Michigan, US
- Died: January 25, 1985 (aged 78); Glendale, California, US
- Occupation: American film composer
- Years active: 1936–1985

Paul J. Smith (October 30, 1906 – January 25, 1985) was an American music composer and violinist best known for his work at Disney.

== Life and career ==
Smith was born in Calumet, Michigan on October 30, 1906. Upon graduating high school, he studied music at The College of Idaho from 1923 to 1925 before he was accepted into the Bush Conservatory of Music in Chicago, Illinois. His abilities in theory and composition earned him a scholarship to study music theory at Juilliard, however, it is unclear if he ever pursued this invitation.

Smith joined Disney in 1934 and spent much of his life working as composer for many of its films' scores, animated and live-action alike, movie and television alike.

He received an Oscar nomination for Snow White and the Seven Dwarfs (1937). He won an Academy Award for Best Original Score with Leigh Harline and Ned Washington for Pinocchio, which was his first and only Oscar win. He received six more nominations for Saludos Amigos (1942), Victory Through Air Power (1943), The Three Caballeros (1945), Song of the South (1946), Cinderella (1950) and Perri (1957).

In Fantasia, he is one of the studio employees in the orchestra. He also composed the scores for most of the True-Life Adventures episodes and over 70 animated shorts.

He left Disney in 1962 and from 1962 to 1963 he composed music for Leave It to Beaver.

Smith's main collaborator and partner was Hazel "Gil" George, who wrote the song title for The Light in the Forest with him and Lawrence Edward Watkin. Another one of Smith's collaborator was George Bruns who worked with him on films like Westward Ho the Wagons!. Smith also did the stock music for the Blondie series of the late 1940s and early 1950s.

== Death ==
Smith died on January 25, 1985, in Glendale, California, from Alzheimer's disease at age 78. In 1994, he was posthumously honored as a Disney Legend.

== Animation scores ==
- Thru the Mirror, 1936
- Don Donald, 1937
- Snow White and the Seven Dwarfs, 1937
- Donald's Nephews, 1938
- The Practical Pig, 1939
- Pinocchio, 1940
- Bone Trouble, 1940
- Fantasia, 1940 (violinist in orchestra)
- Fire Chief, 1940
- Pluto's Playmate, 1941
- Canine Caddy, 1941
- A Gentleman's Gentleman, 1941
- The Reluctant Dragon, 1941
- Donald Gets Drafted, 1942
- Bambi, 1942 (orchestration)
- Saludos Amigos, 1942
- Fall Out Fall In, 1943
- Victory Through Air Power, 1943
- The Old Army Game, 1943
- Donald's Off Day, 1944
- Tiger Trouble, 1945
- The Three Caballeros, 1945
- The Eyes Have It, 1945
- Californy'er Bust, 1945
- Hockey Homicide, 1945
- The Lady Said No, 1946
- Song of the South, 1946 (cartoon segments)
- Fun and Fancy Free, 1947
- Mail Dog, 1947
- Melody Time, 1948 (Pecos Bill and Johnny Appleseed)
- So Dear to My Heart, 1949
- Toy Tinkers, 1949
- Cinderella, 1950
- Trailer Horn, 1950
- Puss Cafe, 1950
- Motor Mania, 1950
- Pests of the West, 1950
- Food For Feudin, 1950
- Hook, Lion and Sinker, 1950
- Camp Dog, 1950
- Hold That Pose, 1950
- Lion Down, 1951
- Dude Duck, 1951
- Test Pilot Donald, 1951
- Lucky Number, 1951
- R'Coon Dawg, 1951
- Get Rich Quick, 1951
- Cold Turkey, 1951
- Fathers Are People, 1951
- Out of Scale, 1951
- No Smoking, 1951
- Two-Gun Goofy, 1952
- Susie the Little Blue Coupe, 1952
- The Little House, 1952
- Father's Day Off, 1953
- The Simple Things, 1953
- The Jounery Mistery Of Boob, 1963

== Live-action theatrical film scores ==
- Glamour Girl, 1948
- The Strange Mrs. Crane, 1948
- Love Happy, 1949 (conductor)
- In Beaver Valley, 1950 includes "Jing-a-Ling", lyrics added by Don Raye
- Pecos River, 1951
- About Face, 1952
- Water Birds, 1952
- The Living Desert, 1953
- The Vanishing Prairie, 1954
- 20,000 Leagues Under the Sea, 1954
- The Great Locomotive Chase, 1956
- Secrets of Life, 1956
- Westward Ho, the Wagons!, 1956
- Perri, 1957
- The Light in the Forest, 1958
- The Shaggy Dog, 1959
- Pollyanna, 1960
- Swiss Family Robinson, 1960
- The Parent Trap, 1961
- Moon Pilot, 1962
- Bon Voyage!, 1962
- In Search of the Castaways, 1962
- Miracle of the White Stallions, 1963
- Yellowstone Cubs, 1963
- The Three Lives of Thomasina, 1963
