= Nature's Half Acre =

1951 film

- Directed by: James Algar
- Written by: Winston Hibler; Ted Sears; James Algar
- Produced by: Walt Disney
- Narrated by: Winston Hibler
- Edited by: Norman R. Palmer
- Music by: Paul Smith
- Production company: Walt Disney Productions
- Distributed by: RKO Radio Pictures
- Release date: July 28, 1951 (with Alice in Wonderland)
- Running time: 33 minutes
- Country: United States
- Language: English

Nature's Half Acre is a 1951 American short documentary film directed by James Algar. In 1952, it won an Oscar at the 24th Academy Awards for Best Short Subject (Two-Reel). The film was produced by Walt Disney as part of the True-Life Adventures series of nature documentaries, and was paired with Alice in Wonderland during its original theatrical run.

== Plot ==
A showcase of "Nature's Half Acre" (primarily Microclimates) and features birds, insects, amphibians and even plants throughout the four seasons. It features a wide selection of animals including, robins, caterpillars, butterflies, bumblebees, honeybees, woodpeckers, venus fly traps, toads, chameleons etc.

== Cast ==
- Winston Hibler as Narrator
