= Seal Island (film) =

1948 film

- Film poster for Seal Island
- Directed by: James Algar
- Produced by: Walt Disney
- Narrated by: Winston Hibler
- Cinematography: Alfred Milotte
- Edited by: Anthony Gerard
- Music by: Oliver Wallace
- Production company: Walt Disney Productions
- Distributed by: RKO Radio Pictures
- Release date: December 21, 1948
- Running time: 27 minutes
- Country: United States
- Language: English

Seal Island is a 1948 American documentary film directed by James Algar. Produced by Walt Disney, it was the first installment of the True-Life Adventures series of nature documentaries. It won an Oscar in 1949 for Best Short Subject (Two-Reel).

== Cast ==
- Winston Hibler as Narrator

== Production ==
In 1947, Walt Disney contracted with Alfred and Elma Milotte to shoot documentary footage of the wildlife and culture of Alaska. Disney did not see the theatrical value in the footage of human activity in Alaska, but he was intrigued with footage that the Milottes shot of the seal population at the Pribilof Islands. Disney himself coined the title Seal Island for the film, and planned it as the first in a new series of nature documentaries called True-Life Adventures.

The Milottes shot more than 100,000 feet of film and spent over a year filming the seals. The total production cost Disney a little over $100,000.

== Release ==
RKO Pictures, the studio distributing Disney's films at the time, initially refused to release the half-hour Seal Island. Disney booked the film for its Los Angeles and New York theatrical engagements, and RKO agreed to release the film nationally only after it proved its commercial potential and received the Academy Award.

As of January 2022, the short had not yet been added to Disney's streaming platform Disney+ in the United States, although many other True-Life Adventures shorts are hosted there.
