= Water Birds =

1952 American short documentary film

- Film poster
- Directed by: Ben Sharpsteen
- Written by: Winston Hibler; Ted Sears; William Otis
- Produced by: Walt Disney
- Narrated by: Winston Hibler
- Edited by: Norman R. Palmer
- Music by: Paul J. Smith
- Production company: Walt Disney Productions
- Distributed by: RKO Radio Pictures
- Release date: July 14, 1952
- Running time: 30 minutes
- Country: United States
- Language: English

Water Birds is a 1952 American short documentary film directed by Ben Sharpsteen. In 1953, it won an Oscar for Best Short Subject (Two-Reel) at the 25th Academy Awards. The film was produced by Walt Disney as part of the True-Life Adventures series of nature documentaries. It was shot in Technicolor by more than a dozen camera operators and was created in cooperation with the National Audubon Society and the Denver Museum of Natural History.

== Plot ==
The film focuses on the different species of water birds and their habitats, showcasing the beauty and variety of these birds.

== Cast ==
- Winston Hibler as Narrator
