= Einollah Safouri =

Iranian cinema director and actor

- عین‌الله صفوری
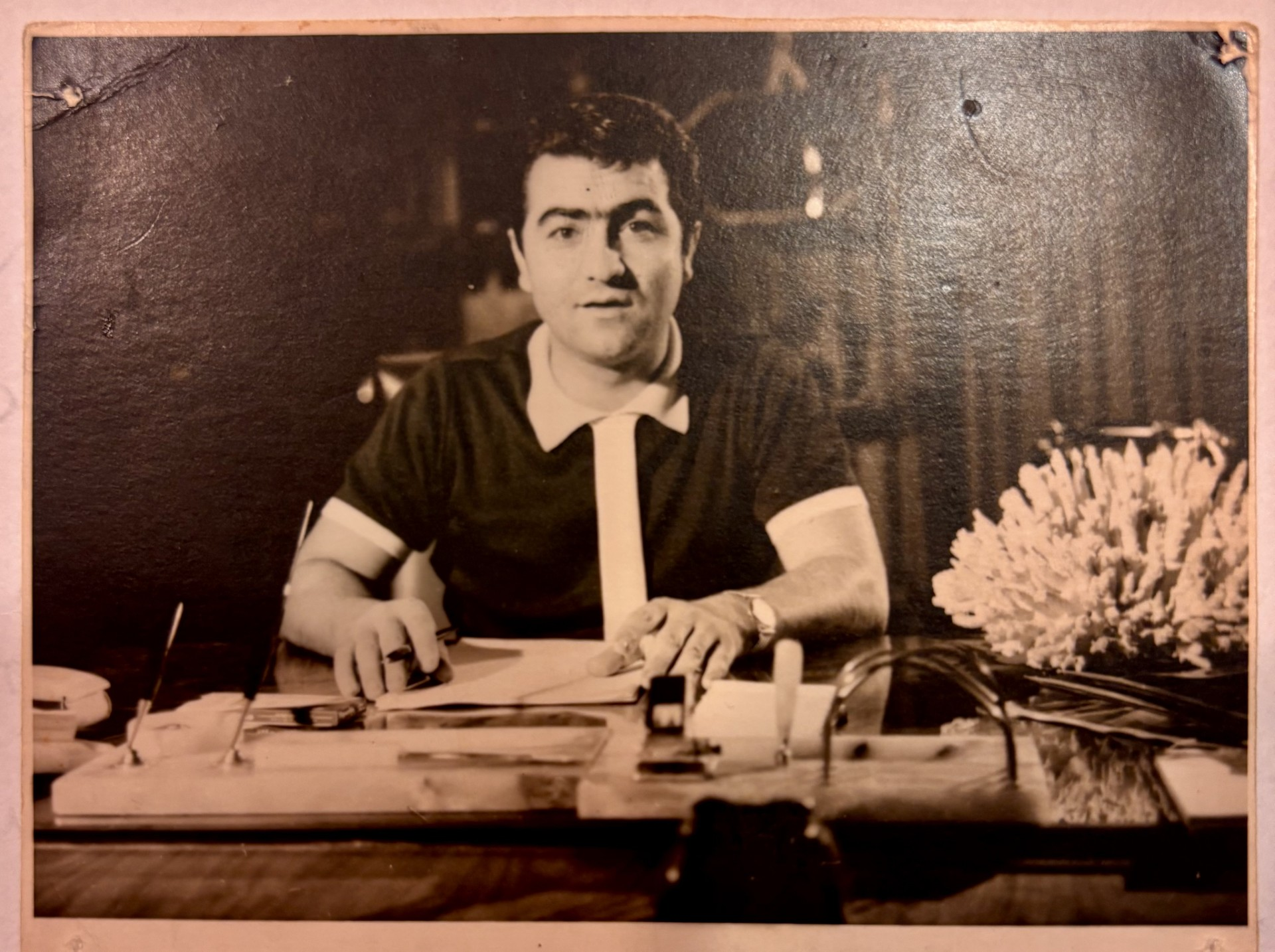
- Einollah Safouri in his office at Missaghieh Studio.
- Occupations: Iranian director of cinema production, actor
- Years active: 1960–1977

Einollah Safouri (Persian: عین‌الله صفوری; 1941–2004) was an Iranian cinema production director and actor active before the 1979 Iranian Revolution. He worked widely across Tehran’s commercial cinema and television, credited on multiple features and on the landmark TV serial Dāʾi Jan Napoleon (My Uncle Napoleon, 1976).

== Career ==
Safouri began in Tehran's Lalehzar theatre district in the early 1960s as an actor and stage director. He transitioned to cinema in production management, collaborating with directors including Masoud Kimiai, Nasser Taghvai, Mehdi Meesaghieh, Feriedoon Goleh, Khosrow Haritash, and Amir Shervan.

In cinema, he contributed to Gavaznha (The Deer, 1974) as Director of Production and also appeared on screen. In a 2020 essay published by UCLA Film & Television Archive, film critic Ehsan Khoshbakht reported that The Deer had ranked first in various Iranian critics' polls as the best Iranian film ever made over two consecutive decades. The International Film Festival Rotterdam described it as a "truly popular national cinema treasure," noting its widespread familiarity among Iranian audiences. The film has continued to screen internationally.

Archival prints of both Gavaznha and Saraydar (The Caretaker, 1976) on YouTube open with Safouri's name in the credits as مدیر تولید (Director of Production).

In television, he was credited as Director of Production on Dāʾi Jan Napoleon (1976). Contemporary listings name him as مدیر تولید for the series.

== Work outside Iran ==
After the 1979 revolution, Safouri continued artistic activity in the United States, directing stage productions in Los Angeles, San Diego, and Las Vegas. He also funded and produced the Farsi-language program Television Melat on KSCI Los Angeles in 1985–1986, among the early Iranian diaspora broadcasts in California.

== Selected filmography ==
- Rouspi (روسپی, 1969) – Director of Production.
- Toghi (طوقی, 1970) – Director of Production.
- Dokhtar-e Zalem Bala (دختر ظالم بلا, 1970–1971) – Director of Production, Actor.
- Khoshgel-e Mahalleh (خوشگل محله, 1970) – Director of Production.
- Sadegh Kordeh (صادق كرده, 1972) – Director of Production.
- Nakhoda (ناخدا, 1971) – Director of Production.
- Baba Khaldar (بابا خالدار, 1971) – Director of Production.
- Deshneh (The Dagger, دشنه, 1972) – Director of Production.
- Baluch (بلوچ, 1972–1973) – Director of Production.
- Badkaran (The Wicked, بدکاران, 1973) – Director of Production.
- Khak (Soil, خاک, 1973–1974) – Director of Production.
- Zir-e Poost-e Shab (زیر پوست شب, 1974) – Director of Production.
- Gavaznha (The Deer, گوزن‌ها, 1974) – Director of Production; also appeared on screen.
- Mahiha dar Khak Mimirand (The Fish Die in the Soil, ماهی‌ها در خاک می‌میرند, 1974) – Director of Production.
- Shab-e Gharibān (Night of Strangers, شب غریبان, 1974) – Director of Production.
- Kandoo (کندو, 1975) – Director of Production.
- Ghol (غول, 1975) – Director of Production.
- Saraydar (The Caretaker, سرایدار, 1976) – Director of Production; also appeared on screen.
- Dāʾi Jan Napoleon (دایی‌جان ناپلئون, TV series, 1976) – Director of Production.
- Kalam-e Haq (Word of Truth, کلام حق, 1977) – Director of Production.
- Kakoo (کاکو) – Director of Production.
- Eshq-e Kooli (عشق کولی) – Director of Production.
- Rabeteh (رابطه) – Director of Production.
- Se Javanmard (سه جوانمرد) – Director of Production.
- Velgardha (ولگردها) – Director of Production.
- Bride of Bianca (عروس بیانکا 1971) – Director of Production
- Additional collaborations with Mansour Sepehrnia, Garsha, and Motevaselani – Director of Production.

== Legacy ==
Gavaznha is frequently cited by archives and critics as one of Iran's most important pre-revolution films. It has screened internationally in retrospectives and restorations, including at the UCLA Film & Television Archive (2020), Museum Ludwig Cologne (2019), International Film Festival Rotterdam (2021), and the Iranian Film Festival Zurich (2025).

== See also ==
- Masoud Kimiai
- Nasser Taghvai
- Khosrow Haritash
- Mehdi Missaghieh
- The Deer (film)
