= Mehdi Missaghieh =

Iranian film producer and director

- مهدی میثاقیه
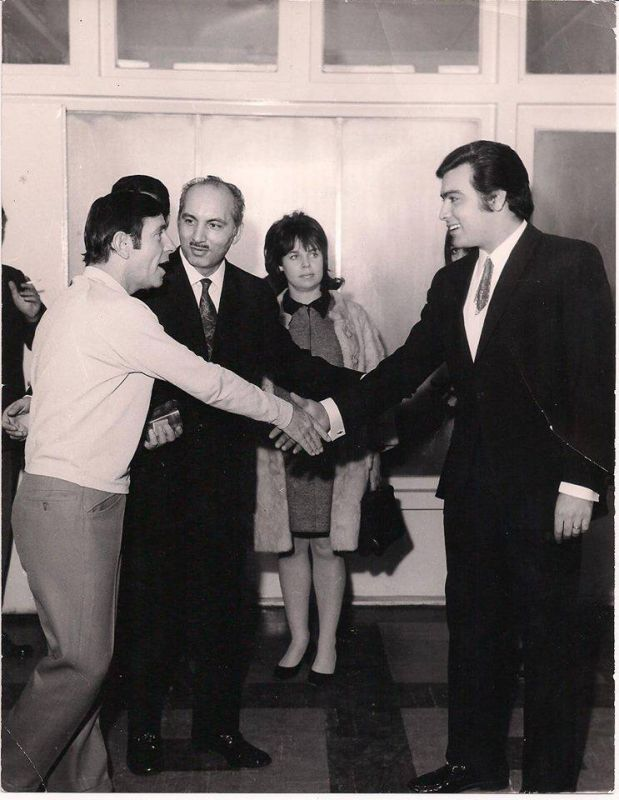
- Mehdi Maysaghieh (Center) with Norman Wisdom (Left) and Manouchehr Vossough (Right) in Iran in 1961
- Born: 1927; Iran
- Died: 1991 (aged 63–64)
- Occupations: Film producer, director, screenwriter, studio owner
- Known for: Founding Missaghieh Studio; modernising production practices in pre-revolution Iranian cinema
- Notable work: The Deer (1974), The Soil (1973), Sadegh the Kurd (1972), Trees Die Standing (1971)

Mehdi Missaghieh (مهدی میثاقیه; 1927–1991) was an Iranian film producer and director active primarily before the 1979 Iranian Revolution. He is most widely recognized for his work as a producer, overseeing a wide range of commercial and socially significant films in the 1960s and 1970s, including The Deer (1974), The Soil (1973), and Sadegh the Kurd (1972).

He co-founded the Kārūn Film Studio in 1952 and later established the Missaghieh Studio in Tehran in 1959, which became one of the country’s leading production facilities. His work is credited with modernizing set design, music integration, and production management for Iranian cinema of the period.

Following the 1979 Iranian Revolution, multiple sources report that Missaghieh was imprisoned because of his Bahá’í faith, and that state authorities confiscated his studio and assets. The Missaghieh Studio premises were later incorporated into the Farabi Cinema Foundation.

== Career ==
Mehdi Misaghieh (1927—1991) was an Iranian movie producer, actor, and studio owner. He began working as an actor in the early 1950s. In 1952 he joined peers to establish the Karun Film Studio, and in 1959 he opened Studio Misaghieh in Tehran, which became one of the most active facilities for feature production in the 1960s and 1970s. Film historian Kaveh Askari notes his prominence among mid-century producers and situates him in competition with contemporaries such as Samuel Khachikian.

At Studio Misaghieh he produced some of the most iconic movies of pre-revolutionary Iran. His groundbreaking advancements in scene design, new techniques in filmmaking, and revolutionary use of music and sound were incredibly innovative. These developments notably enhanced the quality of fictional film production, enabling Iranian films to compete with foreign films at the box office. At thirty, he independently produced the movie A Party in Hell, which was a huge success at the box office in 1957 and was nominated for a Golden Bear at the 8th Berlin International Film Festival in 1958. Misaghieh passed away in exile, yet several screenplays originally planned for production by his studio were later approved and screened by the Islamic Republic.

== Technological advancement ==
By advancing technology within Studio Misaghieh, Misaghieh helped raise the overall production value of Iranian films, enabling them to better compete with foreign pictures for box office success. His contributions helped lay the groundwork for what would become the Iranian New Wave, an internationally acclaimed movement known for its artistic and social depth.

== Imprisonment and confiscation ==
After the Revolution of 1979, Missaghieh was detained due to his membership in the Bahá’í community. Independent reports state that his assets and studio were confiscated under revolutionary court orders and later repurposed as part of the state-run Farabi Cinema Foundation.

== Screenings and retrospectives ==
The Deer (Gavaznha), produced by Missaghieh, has continued to screen internationally in retrospectives and festivals:

- In December 2020, it was presented in the UCLA Film & Television Archive’s “UCLA Celebration of Iranian Cinema,” with Farhang Foundation.
- In November 2019, it screened at the Filmforum of Museum Ludwig in Cologne, Germany, as part of “The Revolution of Images 1979.”
- In 2021, it was featured at the International Film Festival Rotterdam (IFFR).
- In 2025, the Iranian Film Festival Zurich listed him as producer in its retrospective program.

== Selected filmography ==
=== Producer ===
- The Fish Die on the Soil (1977)
- A Safe Place (1977)
- Speeding Naked Till High Noon (1976)
- The Deer (گوزن‌ها, 1974)
- The Soil (خاک, 1973)
- Hakim-bashi (1972)
- Sadegh the Kurd (صادق کرد, 1972)
- Baluch (بلوچ, 1972)
- The Postman (1972)
- Trees Die Standing (درختان ایستاده می‌میرند, 1971)
- Tricksters (1971)
- Scandal of Love (1971)
- Se delavar (Three Brave Men, 1971)
- The Interim Husband (1971)
- Bride of Bianca (1971)
- King of the Hearts (1968)
- The Black Suit Thief (1968)
- A Party in Hell (1956)

=== Director and writer ===
- Mard-e-hanjare-talael (The Golden Larynx Man, 1968) – director
- Ensanha (انسان‌ها, 1964) – director
- A Party in Hell (1956) – co-writer

== Legacy ==
Scholarly and press sources describe Missaghieh as one of the most active and influential producers of pre-revolutionary Iranian cinema. His studios are credited with shaping industrial workflows and technical craft in the Iranian film industry of the 1960s and 1970s.

== See also ==
- Farabi Cinema Foundation
- Cinema of Iran
