= Reza Arham Sadr =

Iranian actor (1923–2008)

- رضا ارحام صدر
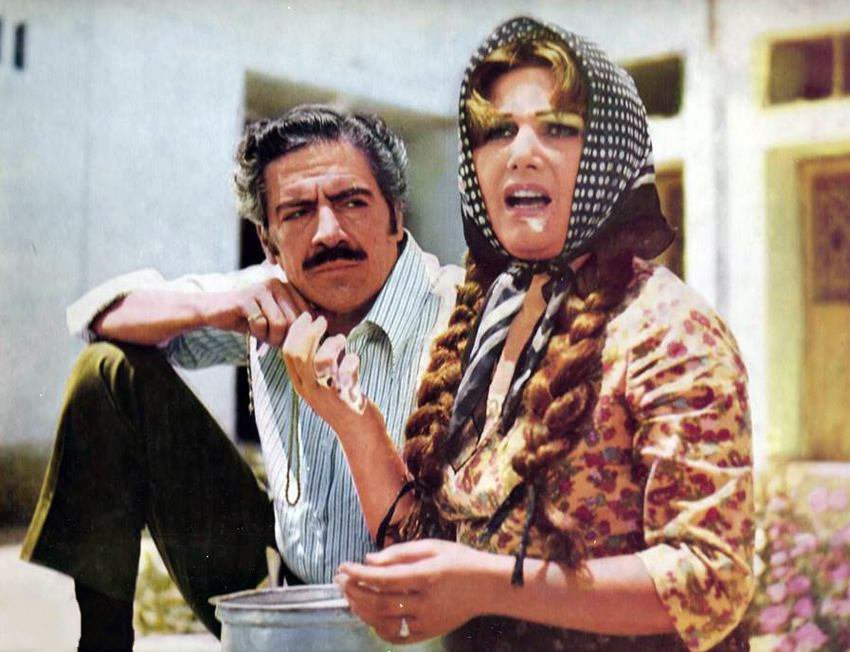
- Reza Arham Sadr (left) with Irene Zazians (right) in 1974
- Born: 3 May 1923; Isfahan, Qajar Iran
- Died: 14 December 2008 (aged 85); Isfahan, Iran
- Resting place: Bagh-e Rezvan Cemetery, Isfahan, Iran
- Education: University of Isfahan
- Occupations: Actor, comedian, art director, set designer, graphic artist
- Spouse: Mehrangiz Jahanshah

Reza Arham Sadr (Persian: رضا ارحام صدر; 3 May 1923 – 14 December 2008) was an Iranian actor of film, stage, and television, as well as a comedian, art director, and designer. He was one of the founders of the Isfahan Theater School.

== Life and career ==
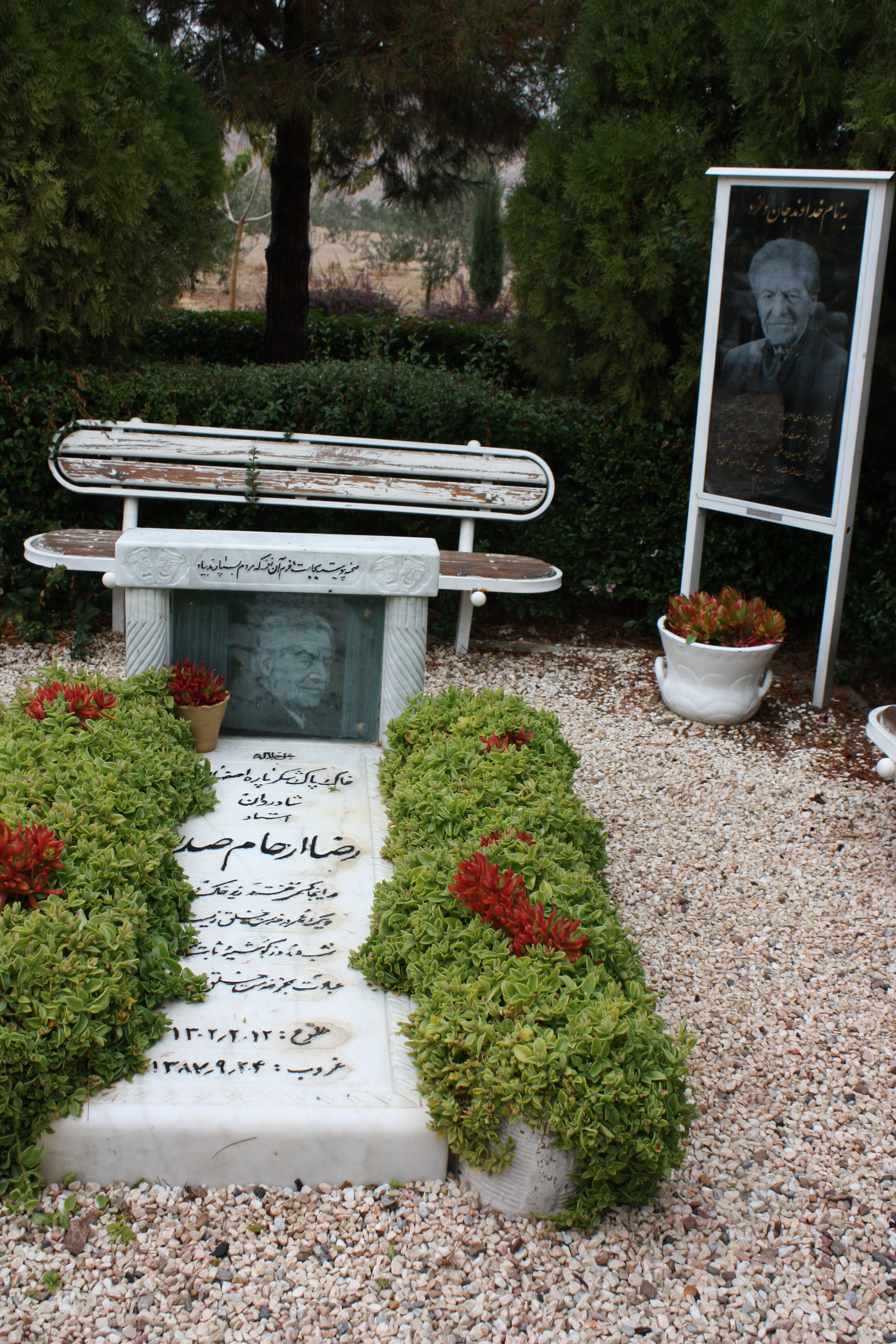
Arham Sadr's grave (2012) at Bagh-e Rezvan Cemetery in Isfahan

Reza Arham Sadr was born 3 May 1923, in Isfahan, Qajar Iran. He began his career in 1947 in the theatre, and he performed on stage in Iran, England, Germany, Austria, Sweden, Norway, and the United States.

Arham Sadr and Morteza Momayezan founded the Troop-e Sepahan (English: Esfahan Troop) in 1945, a traditional comedy theatre group partially funded by the Ministry of Culture and Art (now the Ministry of Culture and Islamic Guidance). As of 2005, the Troop-e Sepahan was still operating.

Arham Sadr formed the Arham Theatre Group in 1965 in Isfahan, a professional theatre company. He was one of the founders of the Isfahan Theater School.

He started his film acting career in the Iranian film A Party in Hell (1957), directed by Samuel Khachikian and Mushegh Sarvarian. After the Iranian Revolution in 1979, he paused his acting career for a few years, however the scope of his fame did not reach the same level in the pre-revolutionary era. Contemporary actors of his include Parviz Sayyad, Nosratollah Vahdat, and Behrouz Vossoughi.

== Death ==
Arham Sadr died of cardiac arrest on 14 December 2008, in Isfahan, Iran. He is buried at Bagh-e Rezvan Cemetery in Isfahan.

== Filmography ==
=== Film ===
Arham Sadr film roles
Date	Title	Role	Notes
1957	A Party in Hell	as Ahmad	
1961	Ali Waxi		
1963	A Star Twinkled		
1965	Woman and Her Dolls	as Mehdi	
1966	The Runaway Groom	as Mandi	
1967	Officer 0008		
1968	Golden Road to Samarkand	as Hasan Ghannad	
1971	Furious Men (film)	as Nasir's uncle	
1972	An Isfahani in New York	as Hooshang	
1972	Stuborness	as Dash Gholam	
1973	Who Put a Bouquet of Flowers in the Water?	as Rajab	
1973	Fairy Child		
1974	The Greatest Dilemma	as Akbar	
1974	Baby Dandy	as Hoseyn Pashnetala	
1978	Stories of Aladdin and the Magic Lamp		
1985	Jafar Khan Is Back from the West	as Dr. Khoshdel	
1991	Legend of the Azure City		
1992	Half the World (film)	as Ketabi	documentary about the city of Isfahan and war

=== Television ===
Arham Sadr television roles
Date	Title	Role	Notes
1973	Hajj Lotfollah's Family		13 episodes
1974	One Thousand and One Nights (1974 TV series)	as Aladdin	10 episodes
1976	Vadang		
