= William Markus =

Finnish film director

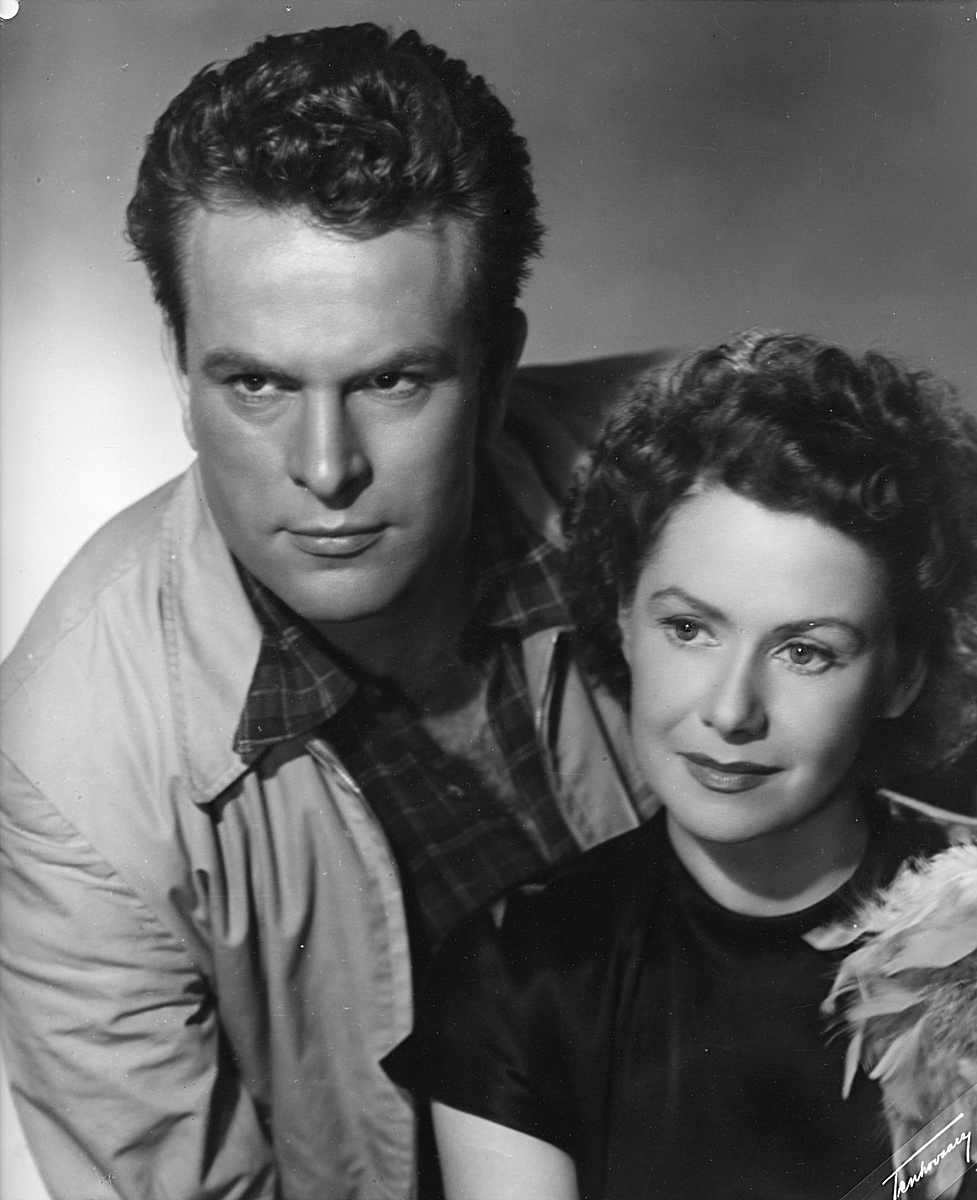
- William Markus and Sonja Wigert in 1951
- Born: Karl William Söderström; 12 January 1917; Liverpool, England
- Died: 10 October 1989 (aged 72); Espoo, Finland
- Occupations: Film director Actor; Screenwriter; Producer
- Years active: 1944–1989
- Employer: Suomen Filmiteollisuus
- Notable work: Miriam (1957)
- Website: Finna

Karl William Marcus (formerly Söderström; 12 January 1917 – 10 October 1989) was a Finnish-British film director, actor, screenwriter, and producer who used the stage name William Markus.

== Life and career ==
Markus was born in Liverpool, England, to an English mother and a Finnish father. He held dual citizenship in the United Kingdom and Finland.

His acting career started in 1944, and he changed his surname from Söderström to Marcus.

Traveler's Oases (1953) is a short film directed and starred by Marcus. The story tells of a Finnish family, which lives in the United States of America. The family visits famous Finnish cities and landmarks.

Autuas Eversti (The Blessed Colonel, 1958) was censored because the Colonel came to life and rose from the coffin. Eventually, the film was released from censorhip after removing unwanted scenes.

Censorship also affected his next film, Verta käsissämme (Blood on our Hands), in 1958. The film was censored four times. Finland's foreign policy was heading towards Finlandization Public outrage forced the censorship to be lifted.

Marcus acted in the British film, The Wooden Horse in 1950. The film was the third most popular film at the British box office in 1950.

He acted in 14 films between 1944 and 1957. He was a writer in six productions.

He directed 13 films between 1953 and 1965. Marcus was a film director at Suomen Filmiteollisuus.

His film Miriam was entered into the 8th Berlin International Film Festival as an Official Selection.

Anneli Sauli, Elina Pohjanpää, Tauno Palo, Olavi Virta, Pentti Siimes, Jussi Jurkka, and Åke Lindman performed in his films.

Markus died in Espoo, Finland, at the age of 72 in 1989.

== Director ==
- Den heliga ilskan 1965
- Karl 1963
- Det förrädiska hjärtat 1963
- Ett fat amontillado 1963
- Lumisten metsien tyttö - Girl of the Snowy Forests 1960
- Verta käsissämme - Blood on our Hands 1958
- Autuas eversti - The Blessed Colonel 1958
- Miriam 1957
- Rakas varkaani - My Dear Robber 1957
- Neiti talonmies - Miss Janitor 1955
- Rakkaus kahleissa - Love in Chains 1955
- Taikayö - Magical Night 1954
- Matkailijan keitaita - Traveler's Oases 1953

== Writer ==
- Det förrädiska hjärtat 1963
- Ett fat amontillado 1963
- Autuas eversti - The Blessed Colonel 1958
- Miriam 1957
- Neiti talonmies - Miss Janitor 1955
- Matkailijan keitaita - Traveler's Oases 1953

== Actor ==
- Rakas varkaani - My Dear Robber 1957
- Matkailijan keitaita Traveler's Oases 1953
- Forsfararna 1953
- On lautalla pienoinen huvila - Small Villa on the Ferry 1952
- Suomalaistyttöjä Tukholmassa - Finnish Girls in Stockholm 1952
- Neljä rakkautta - Four Loves 1951
- Kenraalin morsian - General's Bride 1951
- Vain laulajapoikia - Just Singer Boys 1951
- The Wooden Horse - 1950
- Hornankoski 1949
- Hormoonit valloillaan - Hormones in Full Swing 1948
- Maaret - tunturien tyttö - Maaret - the Girl of the Fells 1947
- Tuhottu nuoruus - Destroyed Youth 1947
- Dynamiittityttö - Dynamite Girl 1944
