= Washington's Birthday Marathon =

Annual marathon

Coordinates: 39°0′21″N 76°52′49″W

- Date: Second Sunday of February
- Location: Greenbelt, Maryland
- Event type: Road
- Distance: Marathon
- Established: 1962
- Course records: Men: 2:22:14 (1978); Robert Doyle; Women: 2:53:29 (1988); Rose Malloy
- Website: gwbm.dcroadrunners.org

Washington's Birthday Marathon is an annual marathon in the United States that has been held nearly every February since 1962.

It is held each year on the Sunday of Washington's Birthday Weekend and is conducted by the DC Road Runners Club.

The race was originally held in Arlington, Virginia, but after a few years, it was moved to Beltsville, Maryland. Finally, it was relocated to Greenbelt, Maryland. The Greenbelt course started and finished at the recreation center of the NASA Goddard Space Flight Center and consisted of three loops around the Beltsville Agricultural Research Farm. When NASA permanently closed access between the rec center and Good Hope Road, the race start was moved to Duvall High School, and finally to the Greenbelt Youth Center. The race continues to consist of three loops on the farm.

A three-person relay is also held at the same time.

After the 2023 race, the DC Road Runners Club determined the course was not suitable, and the 2024 race was not held.

== Past winners ==
- Note: While the Washington's Birthday Marathon started in 1962, it was not until 1971 that women's finishes were recorded. In 1972 no female time was recorded. The marathon was cancelled in 2003, 2010, 2014, 2015, and 2022. The race was held virtually in 2021 due to the COVID-19 pandemic.
- Source: Winners archive compiled by Jack Leydig, Juraj Gasparovic, George Banker, and Jay Jacob Wind.

Key: Course record

Edition	Year	Men's winner	Time (h:m:s)	Women's winner	Time (h:m:s)
1st	1962	Richard Haines (USA)	2:32:44		
2nd	1963	Lou Castagnola (USA)	2:35:18		
3rd	1964	Richard Haines (USA)	2:32:40		
4th	1965	Robert Scharf (USA)	2:33:45		
5th	1966	Robert Scharf (USA)	2:25:01		
6th	1967	Lou Castagnola (USA)	2:22:45		
7th	1968	Lou Castagnola (USA)	2:33:11		
8th	1969	Thomas Ratliffe (USA)	2:27:48		
9th	1970	John Loeschhorn (USA)	2:27:27		
10th	1971	Jack Fultz (USA)	2:28:58	Anna Mae Diehl (USA)	3:43:01
11th	1972	Marshall Adams (USA)	2:30:52		
12th	1973	Marshall Adams (USA)	2:24:17	Teri Johnson (USA)	3:57:40
13th	1974	Sheldon Karlin (USA)	2:26:59	Katherine Switzer (USA)	3:14:40
14th	1975	Eddie Hereford (USA)	2:24:30	Marilyn Bevans (USA)	3:04:32
15th	1976	Bill O'Brian (USA)	2:26:40	Carolyn Hahn (USA)	3:25:40
16th	1977	Max White (USA)	2:27:21	Ann Forshee (USA)	3:07:00
17th	1978	Robert Doyle (USA)	2:22:14	Janet Norem (USA)	3:09:30
18th	1979	Chris Mason (USA)	2:26:41	Val Hardin (USA)	3:09:39
19th	1980	Bruce Robinson (USA)	2:26:32	Susan Crowe (USA)	3:06:52
20th	1981	Jim Ulvestad (USA)	2:28:38	Laura DeWald (USA)	3:01:28
21st	1982	Terry Baker (USA)	2:26:19	Vera Thornhill (USA)	3:07:58
22nd	1983	Timothy Tays (USA)	2:26:22	Bunki Bankaitis-Davis (USA)	3:03:10
23rd	1984	Gordon Minty (GBR)	2:35:06	Suzanne Rohr (USA)	3:15:42
24th	1985	Steve Saul (USA)	2:34:16	Margaret Horioka (USA)	3:07:19
25th	1986	Charles Trayer (USA)	2:30:52	Margaret Horioka (USA)	3:14:12
26th	1987	James Hage (USA)	2:28:59	Margaret Horioka (USA)	3:09:13
27th	1988	James Hage (USA)	2:28:18	Rose Malloy (USA)	2:53:29
28th	1989	John McGrail (USA)	2:30:25	Ruth Riemenschneider (USA)	3:07:25
29th	1990	Jack Cleland (USA)	2:41:48	Renee Butler (USA)	3:11:04
30th	1991	John Ausherman (USA)	2:39:34	Hiroko Smith (USA)	3:30:07
31st	1992	Drew Rogers (USA)	2:40:13	Judith Bugyi (USA)	3:14:33
32nd	1993	Ric Banning (USA)	2:46:46	Claudia Ciavarella (USA)	3:13:17
33rd	1994	Alan Ruben (USA)	2:37:54	Bonnie Barnard (USA)	3:02:19
34th	1995	Dominique LaLuz (USA)	2:46:41	Sandi Glass (USA)	3:11:29
35th	1996	Tim Dunlap (USA)	2:43:25	LeAnn Myhre (USA)	3:25:54
36th	1997	Paul Petersen (USA)	2:43:23	Sheila Gallop (USA)	3:27:50
37th	1998	Guy Gordon (USA)	2:37:44	Joanna Tomazic (USA)	3:18:31
38th	1999	Michael Rodgers (USA)	2:44:30	Lisa Bandiera (USA)	3:09:30
39th	2000	John Weaver (USA)	2:57:57	Lisa Bandiera (USA)	3:29:12
40th	2001	Todd Fach (USA)	2:44:14	Sarah McCarney (USA)	3:33:22
41st	2002	Jonathan Dietrich (USA)	2:51:20	Lisa Bandiera (USA)	3:35:24
43rd	2004	Joseph Filteau (USA)	3:10:10	Morgan Windram (USA)	3:18:34
44th	2005	Joseph Lacovara-Switzer (USA)	2:49:25	Marie Sandrock (USA)	3:18:12
45th	2006	Rainer Koch (GER)	2:57:57	Sarah Morrissey (USA)	3:28:33
46th	2007	Luke Merkel (USA)	2:53:21	Patricia Zerfas (USA)	3:30:22
47th	2008	Christopher Hamley (USA)	2:42:15	Lydia Decker (USA)	3:17:42
48th	2009	Frank Leiter (USA)	2:51:31	Anya Oleynik (USA)	3:10:32
49th	2010	(cancelled because of snow)			
50th	2011	Karsten Brown (USA)	2:46:46	Lisa Bandiera (USA)	3:30:45
51st	2012	Bill Uher (USA)	2:47:13	Kristi Hunt (USA)	3:32:22
52nd	2013	Miles Aitken (USA)	3:08:43	Amanda An (USA)	3:35:02
53rd	2014	(cancelled because of snow)			
54th	2015	James Downey and Miguel Perez (USA) (cut to 9.7 miles because of snow)	1:04:33	Brenda Hodge (USA)	1:10:38
55th	2016	Stephen Varney (USA)	3:02:49	Caroline Ferrell (USA)	3:54:16
56th	2017	Mark Carter (USA)	2:58:04	Toni Diegoli (USA)	3:28:20
57th	2018	Jeffrey Redfern (USA)	2:41:16	Kayla Campasino (USA)	3:04:32
58th	2019	Masashi Shirotake (USA)	2:33:57	Christine Westcott (USA)	3:19:16
59th	2020	Jeremy Ardanuy (USA)	2:26:53	Elena Makarevich (USA)	3:15:58
60th	2021	(virtual because of COVID-19 pandemic)			
61st	2022	(canceled because of COVID-19 pandemic)			
62nd	2023	Christopher Collins	2:50:49	Elena Makarevich (USA)	3:12:09
