= 2000 Pennsylvania Avenue =

- 2000 Block of Eye Street, NW
- U.S. National Register of Historic Places
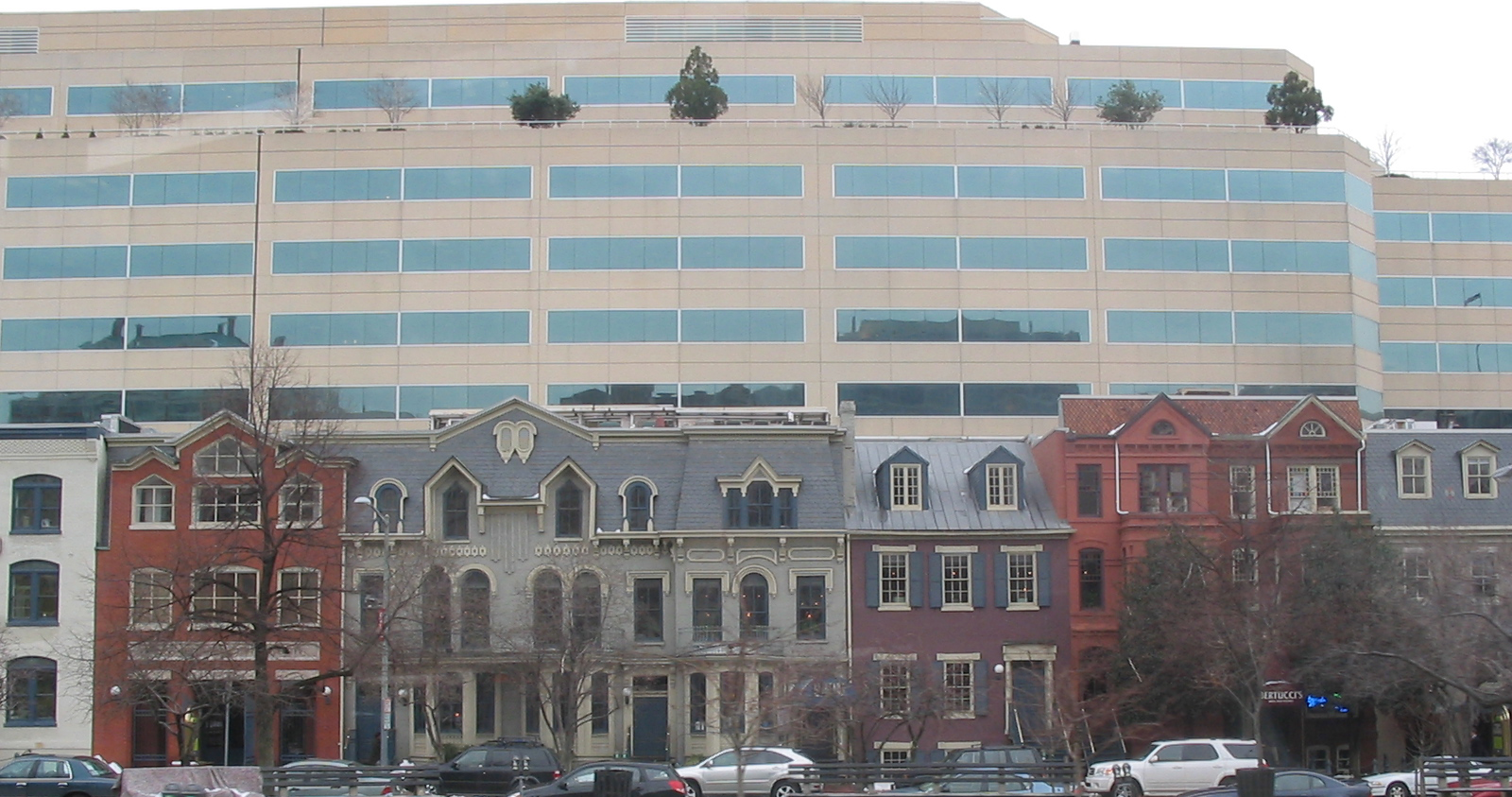
- A view of the complex from Pennsylvania Avenue

- Location within Central Washington, D.C. Location within the District of Columbia Location within the United States
- Location: South side of the 2000 block of Eye Street, NW; Washington, D.C.
- Coordinates: 38°54′0″N 77°2′46″W
- Built: 1831–1896
- Architect: several including Thomas Franklin Schneider
- Architectural style: Italianate, Federal
- NRHP reference No.: 77001496
- Added to NRHP: August 09, 1977

2000 Pennsylvania Avenue (now Western Market), formerly known as The Shops at 2000 Penn and Red Lion Row, is a shopping center and eight-story office complex located on Pennsylvania Avenue, NW in Washington, D.C. It forms a busy gateway into the main campus of the George Washington University, which owns the property. As the 2000 Block of Eye Street, NW, the houses were named a DC Landmark and added to the National Register of Historic Places, both in 1977.

== History ==
=== Early history ===
The original buildings on the site were thirteen row houses constructed between 1831 and 1896. The homes were located on a block bordered by H, I, 20th, and 21st Streets, NW. The houses were mostly initially owned by merchants, who kept small shops inside. The block originally faced Western Market, founded in 1803; the site of the market is a park today.

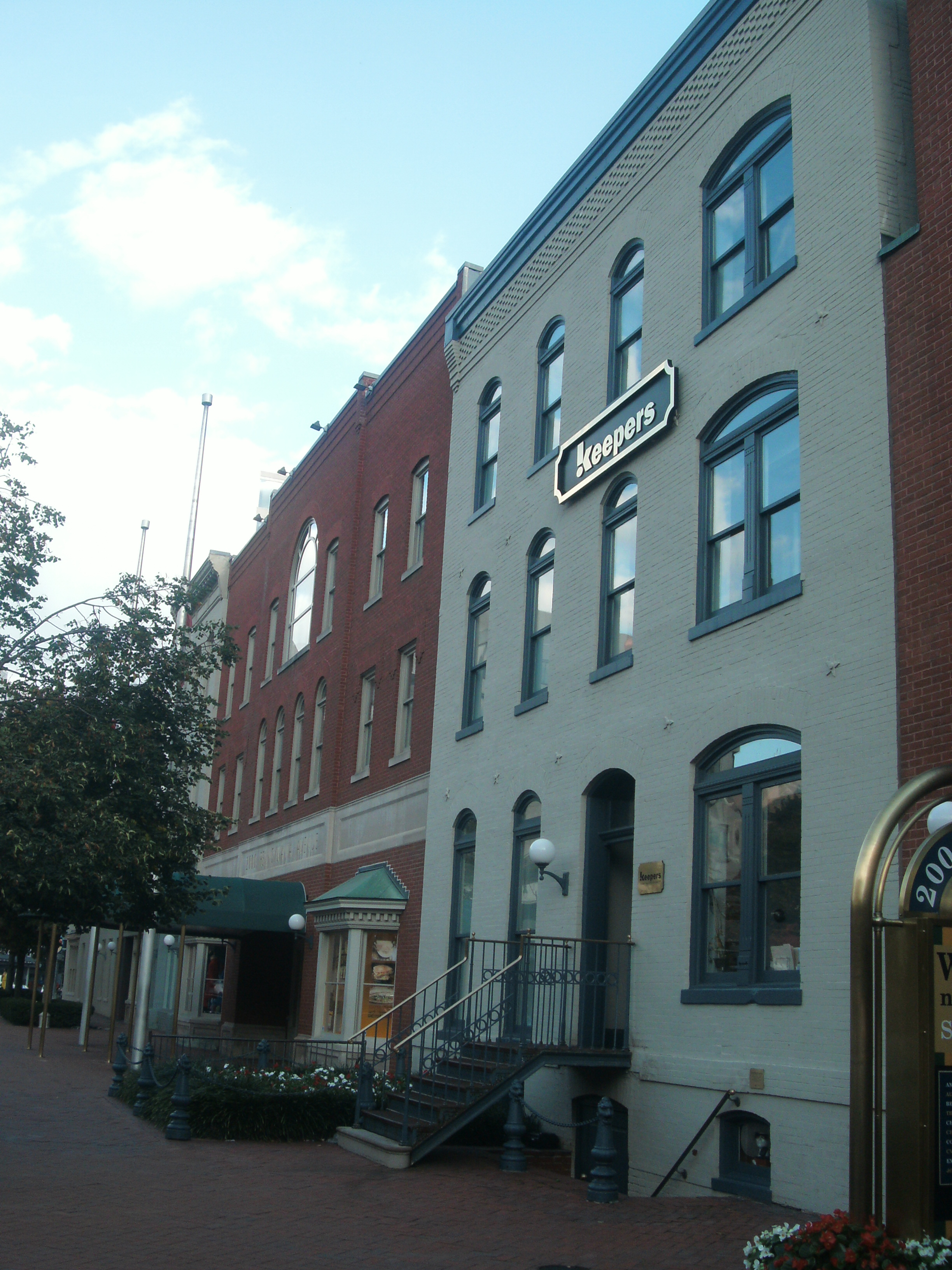
Facades of some of the houses

The largest unit in the block was a corner structure, at 832 20th St. and 2004 I St. Three stories tall, it was constructed with a flat roof and metal cornice; imitation stone covered the facade. The building began life as a pair of independent shops, owned separately, before later being combined. The earliest Washington city directory, published in 1822, lists a grocery store owned by Christian and Matthew Hines on the corner. Grocers have continued to occupy the site into the twentieth century. The corner store was sold in 1837 to Samuel Stott, whose family owned it for decades thereafter. The current building, believed to be his work, was known by the middle of the century as "Stott's Hall". Its third floor was a public hall. Though the exact date of its construction is uncertain, in 1869 the assessed value of 832 20th St. rocketed from $2500 to $6000, indicating a major remodeling; it is believed that the current building was built at an earlier date and remodeled around that year. The construction date of 2004 I St. is unknown, but it is believed that the house was built at around the same time as its neighbor. This structure was owned by Owen Murray, a grocer, in 1869; he sold it to Stott in 1876. Other occupants of the property included Francis Jarboe, George Fillebrown, and William Brown, the latter running a grocery store on the site beginning in 1872 and continuing past the turn of the century.

2006 I St. was constructed in the Greek Revival style around 1846, and has been remodeled several times since then. It is distinguished by its cornice, deep and with wooden dentil blocks. The original owners of the house were the Murray family, who were probably its builders as well. Owen Murray operated his grocery elsewhere on the block between 1843 and 1853; later, at 2006, one Patrick Murray is listed in 1863 as owning a restaurant in the space. Beginning in 1869 John Leamy appears in the city directory as a restaurateur in the same place, continuing until 1871; in 1876 John Ohl is listed as proprietor of a restaurant and saloon. He purchased the building from the Murrays; he continued to own it past 1888, when its occupant, John Werner, kept a saloon on the site. The building has continued to serve in various commercial capacities, including again as a restaurant recently.

2018 I St. was constructed in 1886. Its builder was carpenter Richard Fowler, member of the firm F.A. Conrad & Co. and resident in the neighborhood. The house, in Victorian style, has a corbeled brick cornice; its pressed brick facade, unaltered since it was built, is broken by a variety of arched windows, in different sizes. The house is three stories tall, with four bays and a flat roof. A combined residential and commercial space, the house was built for the Eikers, a family of merchants – Isaac Eiker and his sons, who sold butter, had moved to the site in 1876, and family members ether ran stalls in several area markets or were the proprietors of grocery stores. They owned the building well into the 20th century; more recently, it has served as office space.

2022 and 2024 I St. were constructed by former DC territorial governor Alexander Robey Shepherd between 1874 and 1875. They were the central two units in a row of four, and were built as mirror images of each other, under a mansard roof. Not long after the buildings were completed, Shepherd sold 2022 I St., to Isaac Filbert, a contractor; Arthur W. Fairfax, a grocer, was listed as the building's tenant in 2022. His family continued to own it until it was purchased by the Foley Company in 1960. Shepherd continued to own the house at 2024 I. St., likely renting it out until his flight from the city, whereupon it was handed over to his creditors.

2040 I St. and 825 21st St. were completed in 1879 by Robert Earl, along with a third unit (2038 I St.), now demolished. Earl is listed in records as having lived in the neighborhood, on H St. between 20th and 21st, as early as 1830; for over forty years he ran a livery stable nearby. His son, Charles, took over in 1874, moving the business a short distance to 19th St. 2040 I St. is not owned by George Washington University, the only structure on the block which is under different ownership.

=== Later uses ===
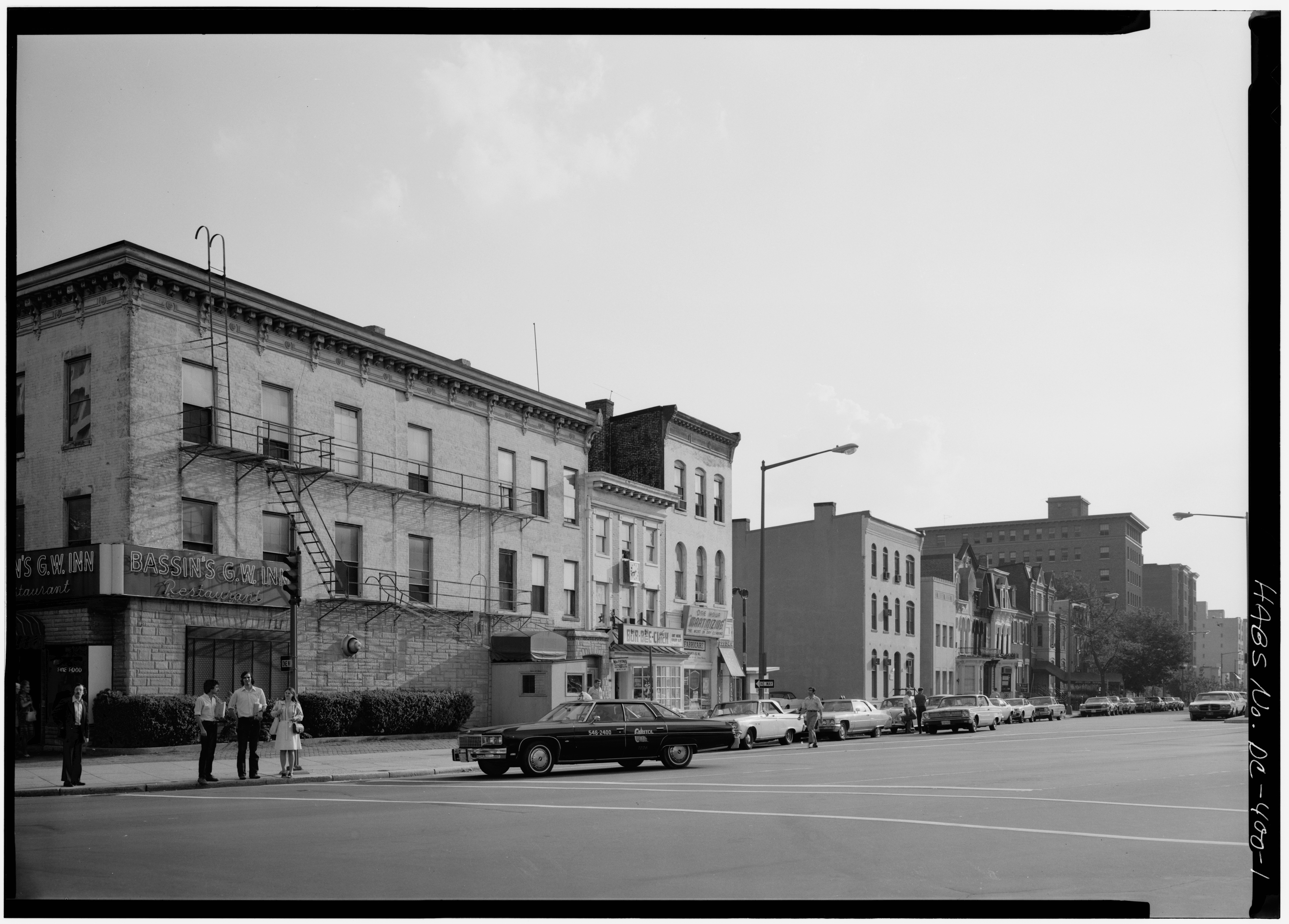
The 2000-2042 I Street commercial block from the northwest prior to the construction of the office complex

By the time George Washington University took possession of the houses, some were vacant, and the block was generally in poor condition.

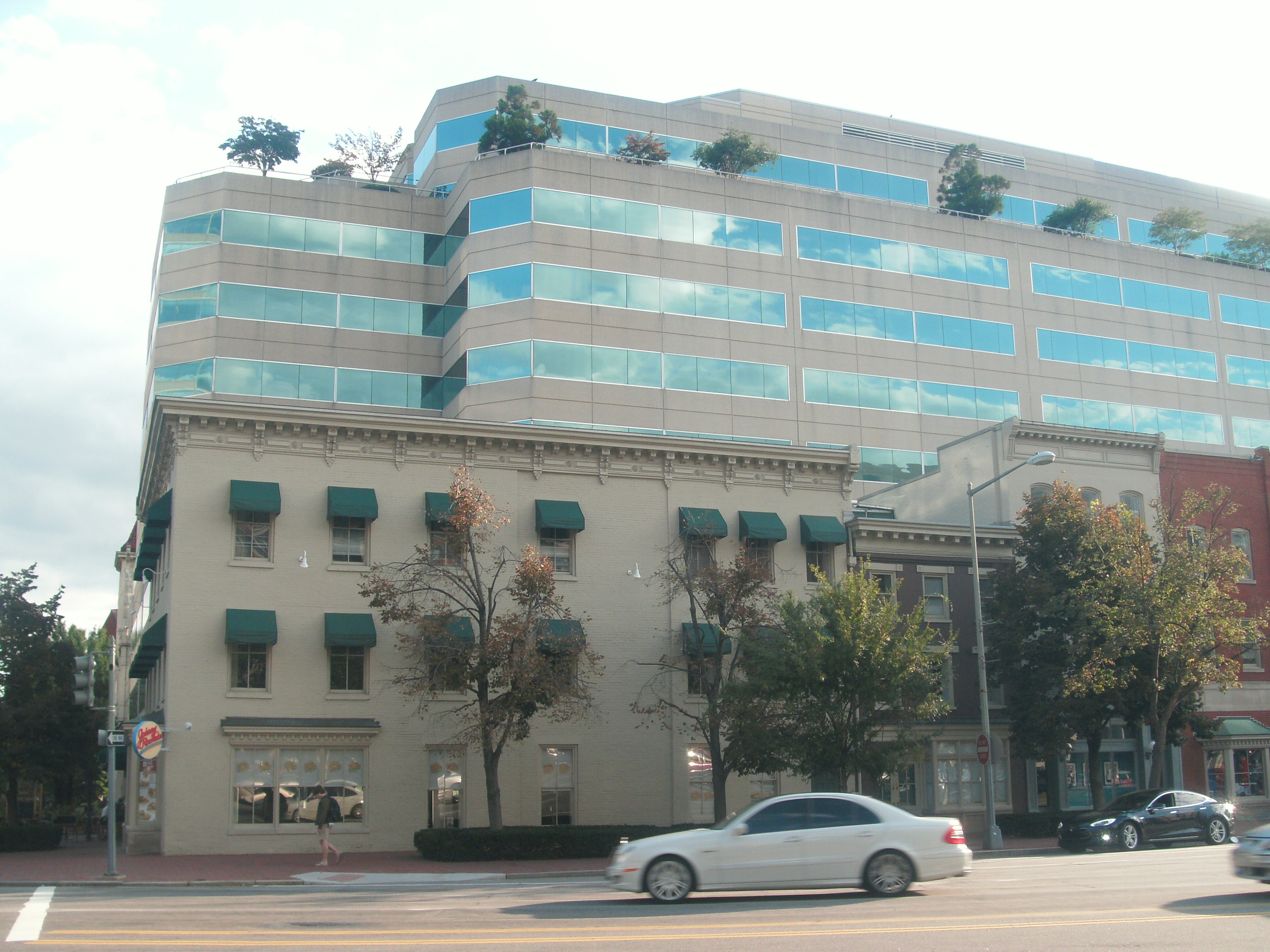
Corner units at 2040 I St. and 825 21st St.; in 2013, when the picture was taken, these structures housed a Johnny Rockets

Battles to preserve the row of houses began in October 1976, when the developer who owned several of them began demolishing the house at 2022 I St. Don't Tear It Down (forerunner to the DC Preservation League), a group of historical preservationists organized in 1971 to save the Old Post Office building from destruction, convinced a judge to order a temporary restraining order stopping destruction, as a request to declare the entire block a historic landmark was pending at the time. The developer then attempted, in November, to demolish the house at 2030 I St.; this structure was already listed on the National Register of Historic Places, however, and the state historic preservation officer invoked a delay of 180 days. Discussions with the community did not begin until the 179th day, and a thirty-day extension to the stay was granted. When this expired, the developer began demolition of the house; preservationists managed to get a restraining order in time to preserve the front half of the structure. Citing the requirement for "meaningful discussion" as laid out in a previous historic preservation case, Don't Tear It Down argued that they had not been able to adequately present their case; while the presiding judge stated that "meaningful discussion" was "beyond the court’s comprehension", he nevertheless issued an injunction preventing further demolition before the case could be heard by the DC Court of Appeals. In the event, historic preservation legislation was passed in 1978 before final adjudication, saving the buildings from destruction. The current design of the property is the result of discussions with local preservation groups.

Construction of the office building, between 1982 and 1983, involved demolishing the backs of the houses while retaining their facades; it was the first time the practice of partial demolition was used in Washington, DC. The thirteen buildings were joined during construction of the shops and office building; some of their original materials were retained for the finished product. Work began on the complex on December 28, 1982; it was named on October 19, 1983. In addition to office space, the complex contained restaurants and other commercial establishments, including a Bertucci's and a CVS Pharmacy.

The office building has sometimes been called the Cruise Ship Building due to its appearance. The block as a whole is sometimes called Red Lion Row, a name taken from Lindy's Red Lion pub which was situated at its corner until late 2018.

The 2000 Penn complex was renovated to include more vendors, additional entrances, and various other modernizations with a layout similar to Eastern Market. The renovated space is called Western Market.
