= DCRRC Track Championships =

- Date: July
- Location: Alexandria, Virginia; Arlington, Virginia
- Event type: All-comers track meet
- Distance: Mile, 3000 meters, 5000 meters
- Established: 1997
- Course records: Men: 3:08 Willy Fink (2015); Women: 4:48.7 Alisa Harvey (2006)

The DCRRC Track Championships is an annual all-comers track meet in the United States that has been held since the early 1990s. It is hosted by the DC Road Runners Club. Although it has offered multiple distances, it historically emphasizes the mile race. From 2012 the meet has offered prize money in an effort to attract more runners.

Over the years the meet has been held at Wakefield High School, Washington-Lee High School, and T.C. Williams High School. While the distances offered in the championships has changed slightly over time, the meet consistently hosts a mile race on the track. Due to this consistent tradition, the meet was recognized and promoted by the RRCA's Bring Back The Mile tour. All runners regardless of their experience are allowed to race and are subsequently divided into heats depending on their seeded times.

== Mile winners ==
- Note:

Key: Meet record

Edition	Men's mile winner	Time (m:s)	Women's mile winner	Time (m:s)
2004	Rick Rourke	4:23.29	Susanna Kvasnicka	5:08.67
2005	Kyle Mangum	4:33	Sarah Spalding	5:11
2006	Nate Rosenthal	4:29.4	Alisa Harvey	4:48.7
2007	Bert Rodriguez	4:24.1	Kerry Meagher	5:05.8
2008	Will Viviani	4:21.6	Kristen Henehan	4:55.1
2009	Will Viviani	4:22.4	Tara Guelig	5:29.3
2010	Matt Chandler	4:30.8	Erica Nemmers	4:59.9
2011	Bert Rodriguez	4:25.0	Audrey Perlow	5:46.0
2012	Sean Graham	4:16.2	Hanna Bartholomew	4:57.0
2013	David Chorney	4:13.67	Susanna Sullivan	5:00.00
2014	Sandy Roberts	4:09.35	Susanna Sullivan	4:49.65
2015	Jack Bolas	4:05	Ericka Charles	5:10
2016	Jack Bolas	4:11.0	Susanna Sullivan	4:52.1
2017	Jack Bolas	4:09.19	Kieran Gallagher	4:53.78
2018	Willy Fink	4:03.7	Allie Buchalski	04:53.0
2019	Willy Fink	3:58.84	Shannon Osika	4:08.68*
*1500 meters
