= McGrail =

McGrail is a surname. Notable people with the surname include:

- Ben McGrail (contemporary), British broadcast journalist
- Edwina McGrail (born 1950), Welsh artist and poet
- Joe McGrail (born 1964), American gridiron football player
- John McGrail (born 1956), American long-distance runner
- Nuala Anne McGrail, a protagonist in the Nuala Anne McGrail series of mystery novels by Father Andrew M. Greeley
- Peter McGrail (born 1996), British boxer
- Stephen McGrail (born 1948), American politician from Massachusetts
- Walter McGrail (1888–1970), American film actor
