= Greenbelt 15K =

The Greenbelt 15K is a road race held annually on Sunday of Labor Day weekend. Over 400 racers participate in the Greenbelt, Maryland event. The race is hosted by the DC Road Runners Club and held in honor of Larry Noël, longtime club president (deceased).
