= All-comers track meet =

All comers track meets are usually small local track and field athletics events. The size of the meet can vary widely, from a handful to hundreds of participants. The formal elements required are a place for the race to take place, and neutral officials to start and judge the finish of a race.

All comers track meets have been long standing traditions held in most major cities across the United States and Canada. Some series have a history going back over 50 years. There is a winter season typically starting in December and going through the end of February, which can use indoor facilities. The summer season starts around the beginning of June and goes into August. A regularly updated listing of such meets is kept on the North American All Comers Meet Directory. In June 2009, this site listed over fifty active all comer track meet series in North America.

The phrase all comers is used in North America, Oceana and English speaking Asia.

Larger meets can be seeded. Some meets are formally organized with all races prepared by registering hours or days in advance, some just break people up by their age groups, less formal meets might just ask the athletes standing at the start line how fast they plan on running.

Each meet can choose to limit or define the events they wish to hold, some limited to running events, sprints, jumps or throws. Occasionally meets are called "all comers" but are actually limited by the age groups served or have qualifying standards that entrants must have achieved in order to enter. Many of those requirements are set because of the limitations of the facilities or the number of volunteers available.

== Records ==
USATF keeps American records for All-Comers Meets.

Fortune Gordien set the world record in the discus throw at a 1953 all-comers meet in Pasadena, California that lasted almost six years. Guinness Book of Track and Field: Facts and Feats called the audience of 48, the smallest crowd ever to witness a world record.

== Notable all comers series ==
- DCRRC Track Championships, Washington, D.C. metropolitan area, started 1997
- LAUSD Series, Los Angeles, CA, started 1962
- Los Gatos Series (San Jose, CA area) started 1980
- Club Northwest Series, Shoreline, WA, (Seattle area) started 1969
- Hal Martin All Comers Series, Rochester, MN started 1973
- Atlanta Track Club Series, Atlanta, GA
- Potomac Valley Series Washington, D.C.
- University of Chicago Series, Chicago, IL
- Oregon Track Club Summer All Comers Meets, Eugene, OR
- Bellingham Summer All Comers Meets, Bellingham, WA
