= John McGrail =

American long-distance runner

John T. McGrail
Personal information
- Nationality: American
- Born: October 28, 1955 (age 70) Stoughton, Massachusetts

Sport
- Sport: Track, long-distance running
- Events: 5000 meters, 10,000 meters, marathon
- College team: UMass Amherst
- Club: DC Road Runners Club

Achievements and titles
- Personal best: 10,000m: 28:47.10

John T. McGrail (born 1955) is an American retired long-distance runner who participated in cross country running, track, and in the marathon from the 1970s to the early 1990s. In 1977 he was the sixth fastest American in the 10,000 meters.

== Running career ==
=== High school and collegiate ===
McGrail attended Stoughton High School, where he would establish his first competitive running spell. He was subsequently recruited by UMass, where McGrail made an impact in cross country and track from his first year; as a freshman, he was UMass's third fastest finisher and was a part of the UMass men's squad which won the IC4A cross country championships for the first time in 31 years. At the 1975 NCAA DI Cross Country Championships, he finished the 6-mile course in 29:34, placing 33rd out of 268 finishers. By the time he graduated from UMass, he had earned All-American honors, recorded a personal best of 14:16.5 in the 5000 meters, and also set his school's record in the 10,000 meter run at the 1977 Penn Relays, where he finished in third place in a time of 28:47.1. His UMass 10K record still stands as of 2015.

=== Post-collegiate ===
After college, McGrail pursued road racing and participated in running various long-distance events up to the marathon. He placed 89th overall at the 1988 Boston Marathon, finishing in a time of 2:28:30. In July that year, he won the Carderock 10K run. In November 1988, at the Marine Corps Marathon, he finished in 16th place overall with a time of 2:29:56. In 1989, he was the winner of the Washington's Birthday Marathon, in a time of 2:30:25. At the end of the same year he was named Runner of the Year by DC Road Runners Club.
