= Return (1953 film) =

- Directed by: Samouel Khachikian
- Produced by: Sanasar Khachatoorian
- Cinematography: Boris Matayof
- Production company: Diana Film
- Release date: 31 October 1953
- Running time: 100 minutes
- Country: Iran
- Language: Persian

Return (Persian: Bazgasht) is a 1953 Iranian drama film directed by Samouel Khachikian.

== Cast ==
- Arman
- Hayedeh
- Mehri Aghili
- Ezzatollah Vosoogh
- Shahin
- Akbar Khajavi
- Rahim Roshanian
- Massoud Poor Zanjani

== Bibliography ==
- Mohammad Ali Issari. Cinema in Iran, 1900-1979. Scarecrow Press, 1989.
