= Perri (film) =

1957 film by Ralph Wright, N. Paul Kenworthy

- Directed by: N. Paul Kenworthy; Ralph Wright
- Written by: Ralph Wright; Winston Hibler
- Based on: Perri by Felix Salten
- Produced by: Winston Hibler
- Narrated by: Winston Hibler
- Edited by: Jack Atwood
- Music by: Score: Paul J. Smith; Songs: George Bruns; Winston Hibler; Ralph Wright; Paul J. Smith; Hazel "Gil" George; Song arrangements: Carl Brandt; Orchestrations: Carl Brandt; Franklyn Marks
- Production company: Walt Disney Productions
- Distributed by: Buena Vista Film Distribution Co., Inc.
- Release date: August 28, 1957
- Running time: 75 minutes
- Country: United States
- Language: English
- Box office: $1.75 million (US rentals)

Perri is a 1957 American adventure film from Walt Disney Productions, based on Felix Salten's 1938 novel Perri: The Youth of a Squirrel. It was the company's fifth feature entry in their True-Life Adventures series, and the only one to be labeled a True-Life Fantasy. In doing so, the Disney team combined the documentary aspects of earlier efforts with fictional scenarios and characters.

== Description ==
The story's title character is a young female squirrel who learns about forest life, and finds a mate in Porro, a male squirrel. In the film, there are seasons called the Time of Learning, Time of Beauty, Time of Peace, and Together Time.

The film was produced, narrated, and written by Winston Hibler, who had previously narrated Disney's True-Life Adventures series of documentaries. Perri was described as "True-Life Fantasy" to avoid confusion with True-Life Adventures.

== Production ==
Perri was shot over the course of three years. The footage used in the film was shot on 300,000 feet of 16mm film, which later edited down to 8,000 feet and converted to 35mm film. Parts of the film were shot in Salt Lake City and the Uinta National Forest in Utah. The film's score was written by Paul Smith, and the film was the first on-screen credit for Roy E. Disney, who worked as a photographer.

== Reception ==
Upon its release, Perri was generally well received by critics and audiences. Along with all the True-Life Adventures, it premiered in December 2006 on Disney DVD as part of the Legacy Collection. It was also one of the titles available on Disney+ when the subscription streaming service launched on November 12, 2019.

== Awards ==
- 1958 Berlin Film Festival: Golden Bear (Best Documentary)

== See also ==
- List of American films of 1957

== Literature ==
- Maltin, Leonard (2000). The Disney Films, 4th ed., p. 142–144. Disney Editions. ISBN 0-7868-8527-0.
- Wills, John (2015). "Felix Salten's Stories: The Portrayal of Nature in Bambi, Perri and The Shaggy Dog". In Jackson, Kathy Merloch; West, Mark I. (eds.). Walt Disney, from Reader to Storyteller: Essays on the Literary Inspirations. Jefferson (N.C.): McFarland. pp. 45–61. ISBN 978-0-7864-7232-1.
