= Jack Bolas =

American athletics competitor

Personal information
- Nationality: American
- Born: November 1, 1987 (age 38) Chapel Hill, North Carolina, U.S.

Sport
- Sport: Track
- Events: 1500 meters, mile
- College team: UW-Madison

Achievements and titles
- Personal bests: 800m: 1:47.29; 1500m: 3:35.54; 5000m: 13:44.21

Jack Bolas (born November 1, 1987) is an American middle-distance runner who specializes in the mile. He competed for the United States at the 2014 Pan American Sports Festival, where he ran in the men's 1500 meters.

== Running career ==
=== High school ===
Bolas attended Chapel Hill High School in his hometown, where he competed in track and cross country. In his senior year of high school, he broke into the national tier when he won the 2005 North Carolina 4A Boys' Cross Country Championships ahead of Sandy Roberts. He placed sixth overall at the 2005 Foot Locker Cross Country Championships, and was the fastest runner in the competition who was from the South Regional class.

=== Collegiate ===
Bolas was recruited by University of Wisconsin-Madison, where he attended school and ran competitively until his graduation in 2010. He placed fourth overall in the men's 1500 meters at the 2010 NCAA DI Outdoor T&F Championships. He was UW-Madison's first runner to have ever run under four minutes in the mile when he ran 3:59.40 at the 2008 Meyo Mile.

=== Post-collegiate ===
After graduating, Bolas joined coach Frank Gagliano at New Jersey New York Track Club. On September 6, 2013, he finished in third place among male finishers at Grandma's Minnesota Mile in a time of 3:53.5. In the summer of 2015, he raced the east coast mile circuit. On July 18, 2015, he won the DCRRC Track Championships Mile in 4:05. On August 13, 2015, he won the inaugural Boxcar Mile in West Chester, Pennsylvania in a time of 3:58.63. On September 9, 2015, Bolas competed at the Hoka One One's Long Island Mile in New York in a time of 3:59.91, placing seventh overall.
