= DC Road Runners Club =

Running club based in Washington, DC

- Abbreviation: DCRR or DCRRC
- Established: 1961
- Type: Nonprofit
- Board of directors: dcroadrunners.org/about-us/board/
- Key people: Lou Castagnola, Jack Fultz, Henley Gabeau
- Parent organization: Road Runners Club of America
- Website: dcroadrunners.org

The DC Road Runners Club (DCRR or DCRRC) is a non-profit regional group that promotes the sport of running in the Washington, DC metropolitan area. DCRR is a member of the Road Runners Club of America. The club was founded in 1961 by Hugh Jascourt, and its members are principally from Virginia, the District of Columbia and Maryland.

Many DCRRC officers have taken prominent roles in the Road Runners Club of America.

== Club Races ==
DC Road Runners conducts approximately 20 races each year, including the Washington Birthday Marathon, the National Capital 20 Miler, and the Alexandria Turkey Trot (in collaboration with the Del Ray Business Association). In March 2026, DCRR revitalized the Four Courts Four Miler. Among the more noteworthy races created by the club are:

- Cherry Blossom Ten Mile Run (now conducted by a separate committee)
- DCRRC Track Championships
- 24-hour track run (for 15 years)
- Larry Noel Greenbelt 15K (since 1957, changed to 12K in 2009)
- Hugh Jascourt 4 Miler
- Belle Haven Half Marathon

=== DCRRC Race Series ===
On an annual basis, in the winter and summer respectively, DC Road Runners conducts the Snowball and Bunion Derby Race series. Each series consists of 7-8 races of varying distances, ranging from the 5K to the half marathon. Every race is open to members and nonmembers. However, club members are eligible to accumulate points in each series as a part of intraclub competition.

At the conclusion of each series, the club recognizes the top series runners in age group categories at formal award ceremonies. Runners must register volunteer credit in order to be eligible for awards.

In July 2026, the Washingtonian listed the Founders Half Marathon and the Predictions and Resolutions 5K, both DCRR Snowball Series events, as two notable DC-based races.

== Club Training Programs ==
As part of its mission, DC Road Runners aims to promote the sport of running for athletes of all abilities. To do so, DCRR organizes a number of training programs, including a 10K program for novice runners in the spring, a 10-Mile training program in the summer, and a marathon training program in the summer and fall. These training programs are open to members and nonmembers, and every program is organized and coached by RRCA-certified running coaches.

Each training program is timed to prepare trainees for racing performances at a number of significant running events, including the Capitol Hill Classic 10K, the Army Ten Miler, and the Marine Corps Marathon.

== Weekly Club Runs ==
DC Road Runners sponsors four regular group runs each week.

=== Monday and Saturday Distance Runs ===
Each Monday and Saturday, DCRR organizes longer distance group runs that are held at a conversational pace.

The Monday run meets at 6:30 pm at Duke's Grocery in the 2000 Pennsylvania Avenue shopping complex in Washington, DC's Foggy Bottom neighborhood. This run is typically 4-6 miles in distance.

The Saturday Long Run meets in North Meade Street Park in Rosslyn, Virginia, across the street from the Iwo Jima Memorial. These runs typically start at 8:00 am, except during the summer months, when the Saturday group will meet at 7:00 am to account for the heat and humidity. These runs will usually range from 10-16 miles in distance (with longer routes during peak marathon training season), but shorter route options are always available.

=== Midweek Track Workouts ===
DC Road Runners also sponsors weekly track workouts at 7:00 pm on Wednesday evenings at Washington-Liberty High School in Arlington, VA and also on Thursday mornings at 6:00 am at Yorktown High School, also in Arlington.

These workouts mirror each other, and they are formally organized to coach runners in the essentials of speed and track running. These workouts are open to runners of all ability levels, and they offer a range of options for various levels of fitness.
