= Bagh-e Rezvan Cemetery (Isfahan) =

Cemetery in Iran

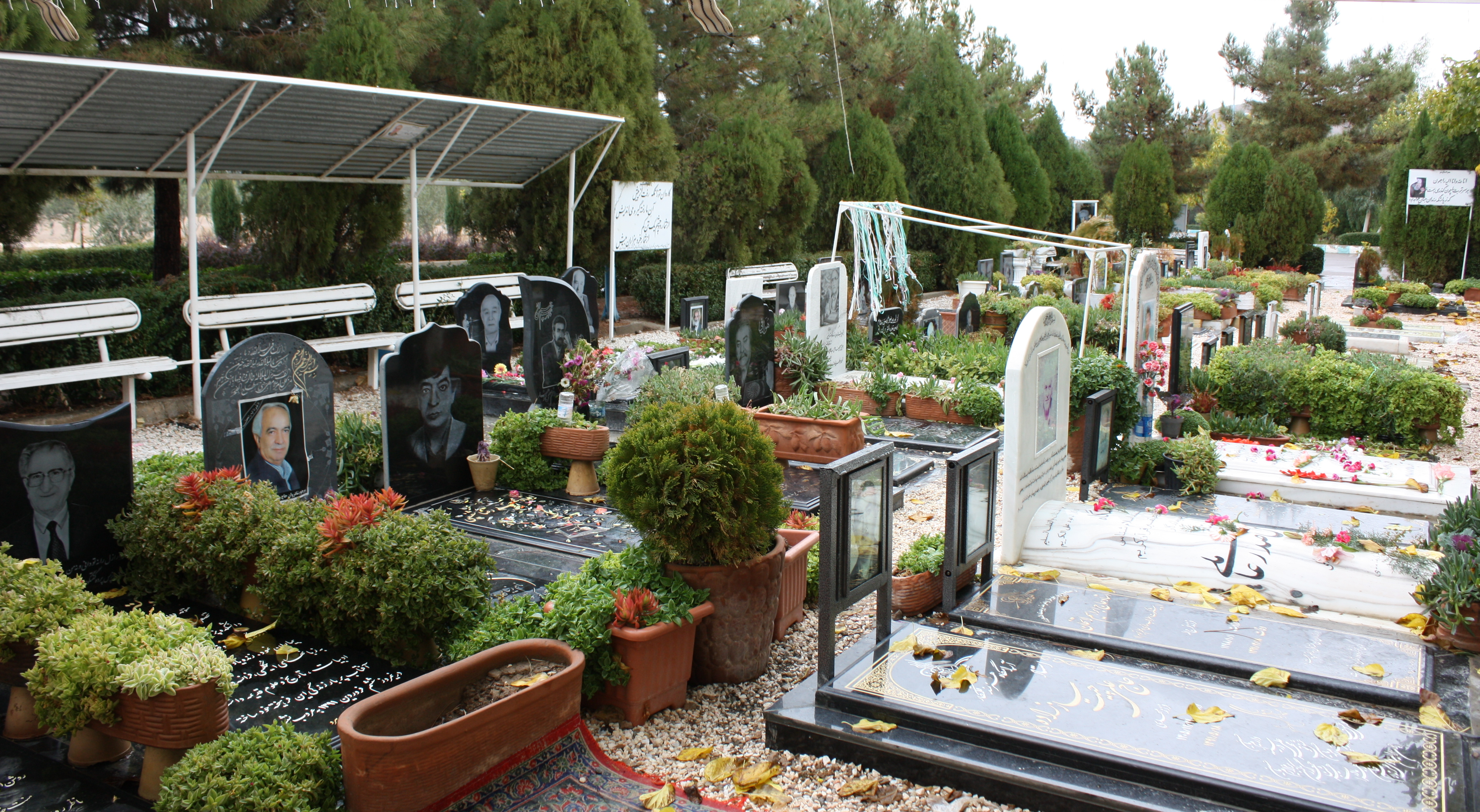
- Interactive map of Bagh-e Rezvan Cemetery

Details
- Established: 1970
- Country: Iran
- Coordinates: 32°38′13″N 51°50′6″E
- Type: Muslims, Public
- Owned by: Cemeteries Organization of Isfahan Municipal
- Size: 1,305 ha (3,220 acres)180 ha green space
- No. of graves: Almost 190 thousands (2017)
- Website: https://new.isfahan.ir/Index.aspx?lang=1&sub=35

Bagh-e Rezvan Cemetery (Persian: آرامستان باغ رضوان) is the biggest cemetery in Isfahan, Iran. There is a 55000m² water reservoir in the graveyard built in 2024, the biggest in the city.

It is at 12 kilometers east of Isfahan.

== Notable burials ==
- Lotfollāh Honarfar (fa) (1919–2006) – scholar
- Ardeshir Hosseinpour (1962–2007) – scientist
- Reza Arham Sadr (1923–2008) – actor
- Mohammad Hoqouqi (1937–2009) – poet
- Clārā Stepāniāns (fa) (1929–2015) – actress
- Mahmoud Yāvari (1939–2020) – football coach and player
- Hushang Harirchiān (1932–2024) – actor
