= Miriam (film) =

1957 film by William Markus

- Directed by: William Markus
- Written by: William Markus; Walentin Chorell; Pentti Unho
- Produced by: T. J. Särkkä
- Starring: Anneli Sauli
- Cinematography: Mauno Kuusla
- Edited by: Armas Vallasvuo
- Release date: 18 October 1957
- Running time: 88 minutes
- Country: Finland
- Language: Finnish

Miriam is a 1957 Finnish drama film directed by Finnish-British film director William Markus. It was entered into the 8th Berlin International Film Festival in 1958.

== Cast ==
- Anneli Sauli as Miriam
- Irma Seikkula as Britta Allnes
- Pentti Siimes as Hans Allnes
- Leo Riuttu as Torvald Allnes
- Yrjö Aaltonen as Boy
- Paavo Hukkinen as Man at the station
- Heimo Karppinen as Man at the station
- Veikko Kines as Shopkeeper
- Aino Lehtimäki as Pharmaceut
- Kaisu Leppänen as Aunt Anta
- Jaakko Maakorpi as Horse Driver
- Liisi Palteisto as Miriam as Child
- Yrjö Saari as Doctor
- Enok Sikiö as Man in the train
- Maininki Sippola as Woman in the party (as Maininki Sippola-Wilska)
