= Mushegh Sarvarian =

- Born: February 15, 1910; Tehran, Sublime State of Iran
- Died: August 13, 1981 (aged 71); Tehran, Iran
- Other names: Mushegh Sarvari
- Occupations: film director, set designer, graphic designer
- Partner: Jenia Movsesian

Mushegh Sarvarian (Armenian: Մուշեղ Սարւարեան; Persian: موشق سروری; also known as Mushegh Sarvari, February 15, 1910, Tehran - August 13, 1981, Tehran) was an Iranian Armenian film director.

He directed a number of films, among which is the 1956 film A Party in Hell, a co-direction with Samuel Khachikian and a notable movie in the history of Iranian cinema. It was entered into the 8th Berlin International Film Festival.

== Filmography ==
- Mahtabe Khoonin (The Bloody Moonlight) (1956)
- Shab-Neshini dar Jahannam (A Party in Hell) (1956)
- Haji Jabbar dar Paris (Mr. Jabbar in Paris) (1961)
- Shahname Akharesh Khoshe (1966)
