= Pentti Siimes =

Finnish actor (1929–2016)

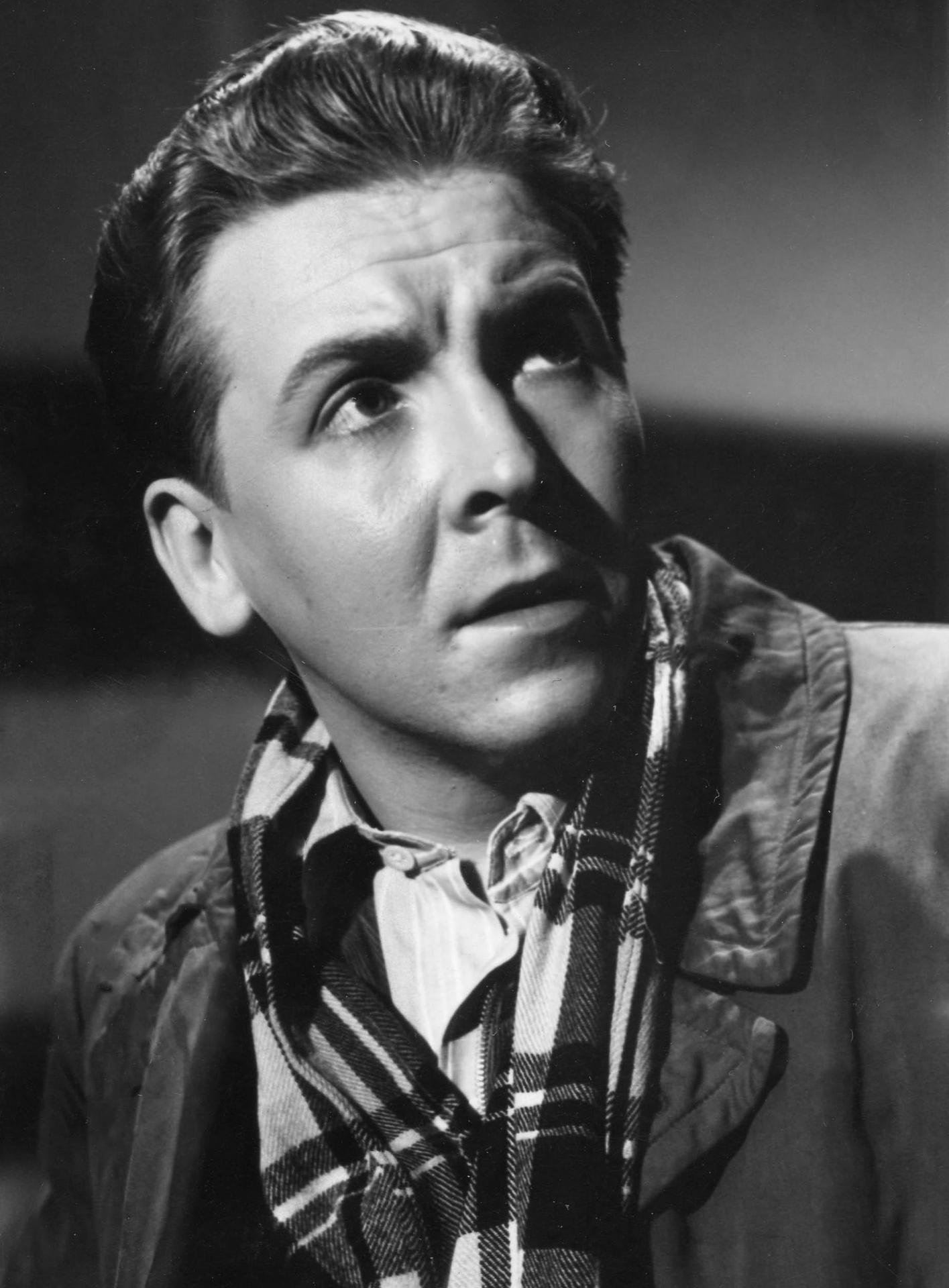
- Born: 10 September 1929; Helsinki, Finland
- Died: 27 October 2016 (aged 87)
- Occupation: Actor
- Years active: 1946–2008

Pentti Kalevi Siimes (10 September 1929 – 27 October 2016) was a Finnish actor. He appeared in more than 80 films and television shows between 1946 and 2008.

Siimes starred in the film Miriam, which was entered into the 8th Berlin International Film Festival. His paternal grandfather was Polish. Siimes was married to actress Elina Pohjanpää from 1956 until her death in 1996.

== Selected filmography ==
- The Unknown Soldier (1955)
- Miriam (1957)
- Inspector Palmu's Mistake (1960)
- Gas, Inspector Palmu! (1961)
- The Stars Will Tell, Inspector Palmu (1962)
- Let Not One Devil Cross the Bridge (1968)
- The Marital Crisis of Uuno Turhapuro (1981)
- Uuno Turhapuro Loses His Memory (1982)
