= Sheldon Karlin =

American marathon runner

Personal information
- Full name: Sheldon Robert Karlin
- Nationality: American
- Born: 1950 Newark, New Jersey, United States
- Died: 16 January 2000 (aged 49–50)

Sport
- Country: United States
- Sport: Running
- Event: Marathon

Achievements and titles
- Personal best: Marathon: 2:26:27 (1974)

Sheldon Karlin (1950 – 16 January 2000) was an American male marathon runner who won the New York City Marathon in 1972.

== Biography ==
Born in Newark, New Jersey, Karlin grew up in Kenilworth, New Jersey, and ran cross country at David Brearley High School. Karlin attended the University of Maryland and competed for the Maryland Terrapins cross country running team. He was promised a sports scholarship if he excelled on the team, but left the team when the scholarship was not forthcoming.

His career in the sport was brief and mostly confined to the early 1970s. Karlin placed fourth at the Washington's Birthday Marathon in February 1972, then had the biggest achievement of his running career later that year at the New York City Marathon. He expressed surprise at his win in a time of 2:27:52, having failed to realize he was the race leader for a portion of the race. At age 22, he remained the competition's youngest male winner for many years, eventually being topped by a 20-year-old Eritrean, Ghirmay Ghebreslassie, in 2016. He returned to win the Washington's Birthday Marathon in 1974 in 2:26:27, and also won the Hunter's Woods Elementary School 20-miler that year.

Following his retirement from the sport, he lived in Livingston, New Jersey, with his wife, Donna. The couple had three children in the 1980s. He died of a heart condition at age 49 following poor health. The Washington Running Club, of which Karlin was a founder member, named its club competition trophy the Sheldon Karlin Cup in his honour.
