= Jack Fultz =

American long-distance runner

Personal information
- Nationality: American
- Born: August 27, 1948 (age 77) Venango County, Pennsylvania

Sport
- Sport: Track, long-distance running
- Event(s): Mile, 2-mile, 3000 meters steeplechase, marathon
- College team: Georgetown
- Club: DC Road Runners Club

Achievements and titles
- Personal best: Marathon: 2:11:17

Jon Willis Fultz (born August 27, 1948) is a retired American long-distance runner, who came to prominence in the 1970s after winning the 1976 Boston Marathon, the world's oldest and most established marathon race.

== Early years ==
John Willis Fultz was born on August 27, 1948, in Franklin, Pennsylvania, the sixth of seven children. He grew up in Franklin, where he attended Franklin Area High School, where he graduated in 1966.

== Running career ==
=== Collegiate ===
Fultz first attended the University of Arizona in Tucson from 1967 to 1969. In 1969, he enlisted in the United States Coast Guard, serving from 1969 to 1973. Following his tour of duty, Fultz enrolled in graduate classes at Georgetown University until his graduation in 1976. While at Georgetown Fultz competed for the men's track team in various middle-distance events, including the mile run and the 3000 meter steeplechase. He ran a personal best outdoor mile of 4:08.3 while at Georgetown.

=== The 1976 Boston Marathon: "The Run for the Hoses" ===
Fultz won the 1976 Boston Marathon in extreme heat with a time of 2:20:19. The temperature was 100 degrees one hour before the noon start time in Hopkinton, Massachusetts. Over the 26.2-mile (42.2 km) course, runners were cooled by water sprayed by spectators using garden hoses.

== Achievements ==
- All results regarding marathon, unless stated otherwise

Year	Competition	Venue	Position	Notes
Representing the United States
1976	Boston Marathon	Boston, United States	1st	2:20:19
1978	Boston Marathon	Boston, United States	4th	2:11:17 (PR)

- 1971 Boston Marathon (2:27:12), 12th Place
- 1972 Boston Marathon (2:35:11), 56th Place
- 1976 Boston Marathon (2:20:19), FIRST PLACE
- 1977 Boston Marathon (2:20:40), 9th Place
- 1978 Boston Marathon (2:11:17), 4th Place PERSONAL RECORD/BEST TIME (2 seconds behind 3rd place)
- 1981 Newport Marathon (2:17:09), 1st Place and COURSE RECORD

== Awards, distinctions, and items of interest ==
Fultz qualified for three consecutive United States Olympic Trials marathons in 1972, 1976, and 1980. Because President Jimmy Carter called for a boycott of the 1980 Moscow Games, Fultz did not run in the 1980 Olympic Trials. In 1996, Fultz was inducted into the Georgetown University Hall of Fame and on that occasion was invited to the White House to run with then-President Bill Clinton. Also in 1996, Fultz was inducted into the DC Road Runners Hall of Fame.

Fultz not only finished the Boston Marathon in first place in 1976; in 1995 he added the distinction of finishing in last place as well: Each year, BAA race director Dave McGillivray runs the Boston Marathon course after all the other entrants have started, and nearly all have finished. In 1995 Fultz accompanied him on the run, and, as the two companions crossed the finish line, Fultz slowed down a step, thus making him the actual last official finisher of the day.

Fultz was diagnosed with arthritis of the hip in 2000, at which time he retired from competitive running.

== Current activities ==
As of November 2008, Fultz is an instructor of sport psychology at Tufts University, a fitness consultant and personal coach, and a training consultant to the Dana-Farber Marathon Challenge. He also is an occasional motivational speaker.

== See also ==
- List of winners of the Boston Marathon

Sporting positions
Preceded by Bill Rodgers	Men's Boston Marathon winner 1976	Succeeded by Jerome Drayton
