= Eastern Market, Washington, D.C. =

- Eastern Market
- U.S. National Register of Historic Places
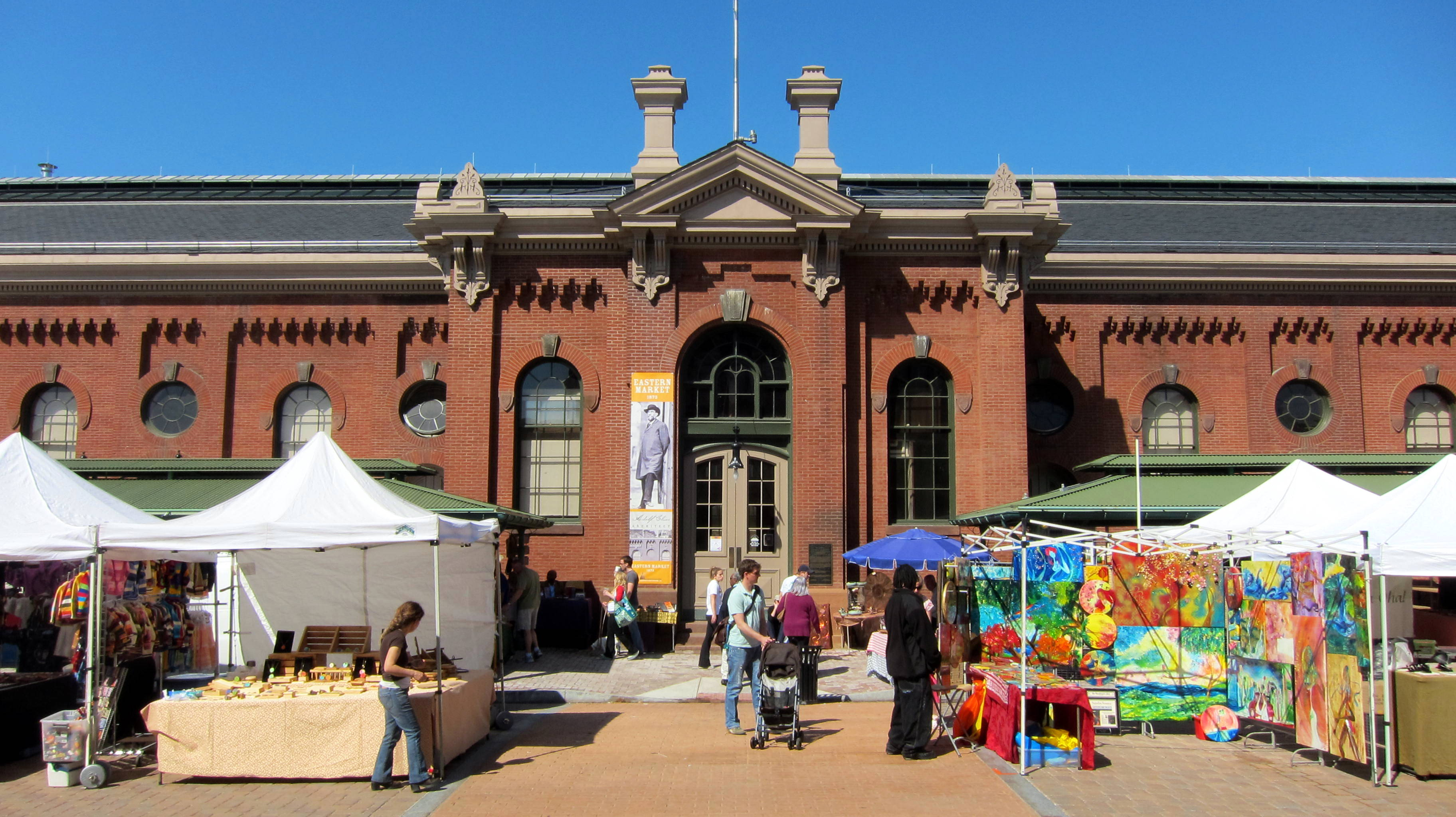
- Eastern Market in 2010

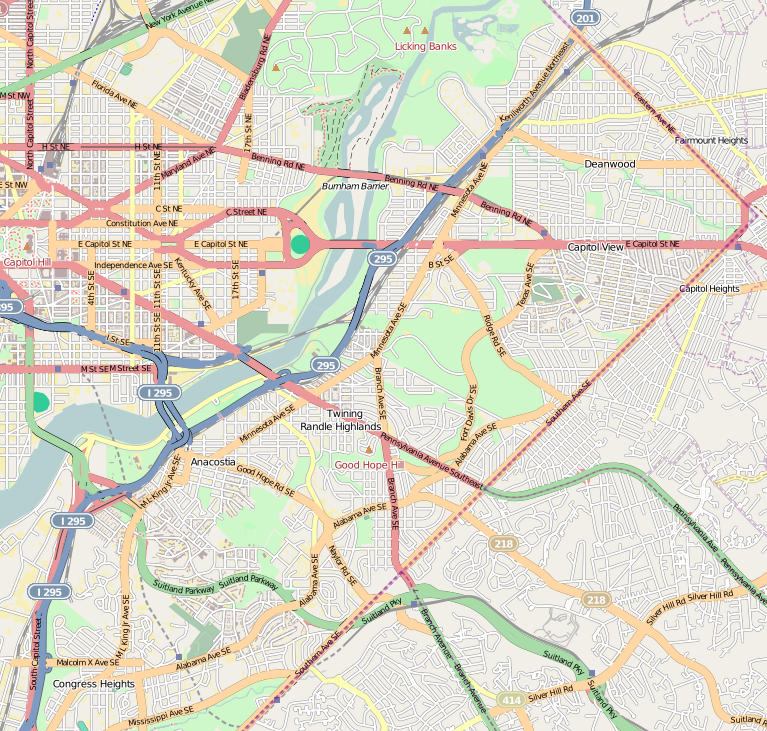
- Location within Washington, D.C. Location within the District of Columbia Location within the United States
- Location: 7th & C Street SE; Washington, D.C.
- Coordinates: 38°53′11″N 76°59′48″W
- Built: 1871
- Architect: Adolf Cluss; Snowden Ashford
- Architectural style: Italianate
- NRHP reference No.: 71000998
- Added to NRHP: May 27, 1971

The Eastern Market is a public market in the Capitol Hill neighborhood of Washington, D.C., housed in a 19th-century brick building. Eastern Market was listed on the National Register of Historic Places in 1971. It is located on 7th Street, S.E., a few blocks east of the U.S. Capitol between North Carolina Avenue SE and C Street SE. Badly damaged by an early-morning fire in 2007, the market building reopened in the summer of 2009 following an extensive renovation.

Eastern Market also marks a smaller community within the Capitol Hill neighborhood by serving as an anchor point for other nearby stores and restaurants. It is served by the nearby Washington Metro Eastern Market (station) on the Blue, Orange, and Silver Lines.

== Overview ==
Of Washington's eight wards, Eastern Market is located in Ward 6. Nestled in the Capitol Hill neighborhood, this area is bounded by North and South Capitol Streets on the west, 15th Street on the east, H Street on the north, and by the Southeast-Southwest Freeway. Working adults, single adults, and families with young children largely populate the neighborhood, which is dominated by rowhouses. It is presently managed under the guidance of interim manager Barry Margeson. The flea market of Eastern Market hosts up to 100 exhibitors from five continents. Presently, Eastern Market is being met with proposals for renovation. The goal of the renovation plan is to link 8th Street's Barracks Row and Eastern Market in order to create a community gathering space.

Eastern Market's North Hall can be rented for weddings and other occasions.

Eastern Market has been featured in scenes of movies including Body of Lies (2008) and Mercury Rising (1998).

== History ==
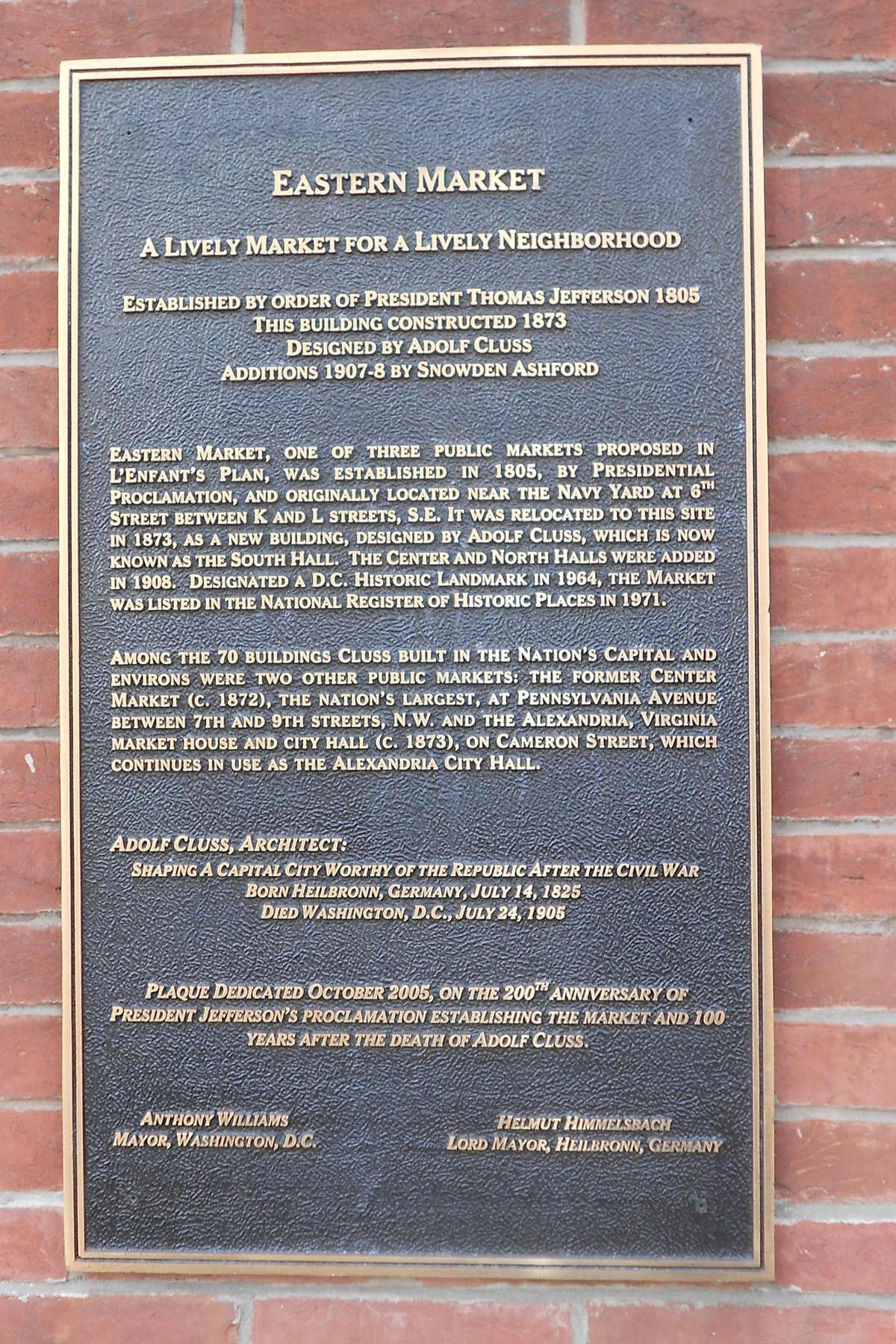
Plaque at the entrance of Eastern Market

=== Original market ===
The first Eastern Market was one of three public marketplaces included in Pierre L'Enfant's plan for the city, to supplement existing markets in Alexandria and Georgetown. The plan also called for a Center Market and a Western Market. In 1805, Thomas Jefferson issued a proclamation calling for Eastern Market to be set up at 7th and L Streets SE, near the Navy Yard.

The original market received heavy fire damage during the British attack of 1814. It was repaired and remained active until the Civil War caused a disruption of supplies. During the war, farmers from southern Maryland set up their own marketplace on the opposite side of the Anacostia River. The market fell into disrepair, and was nearly abandoned. An 1871 newspaper account called it a "disgraceful shed."

=== 1873 relocation ===
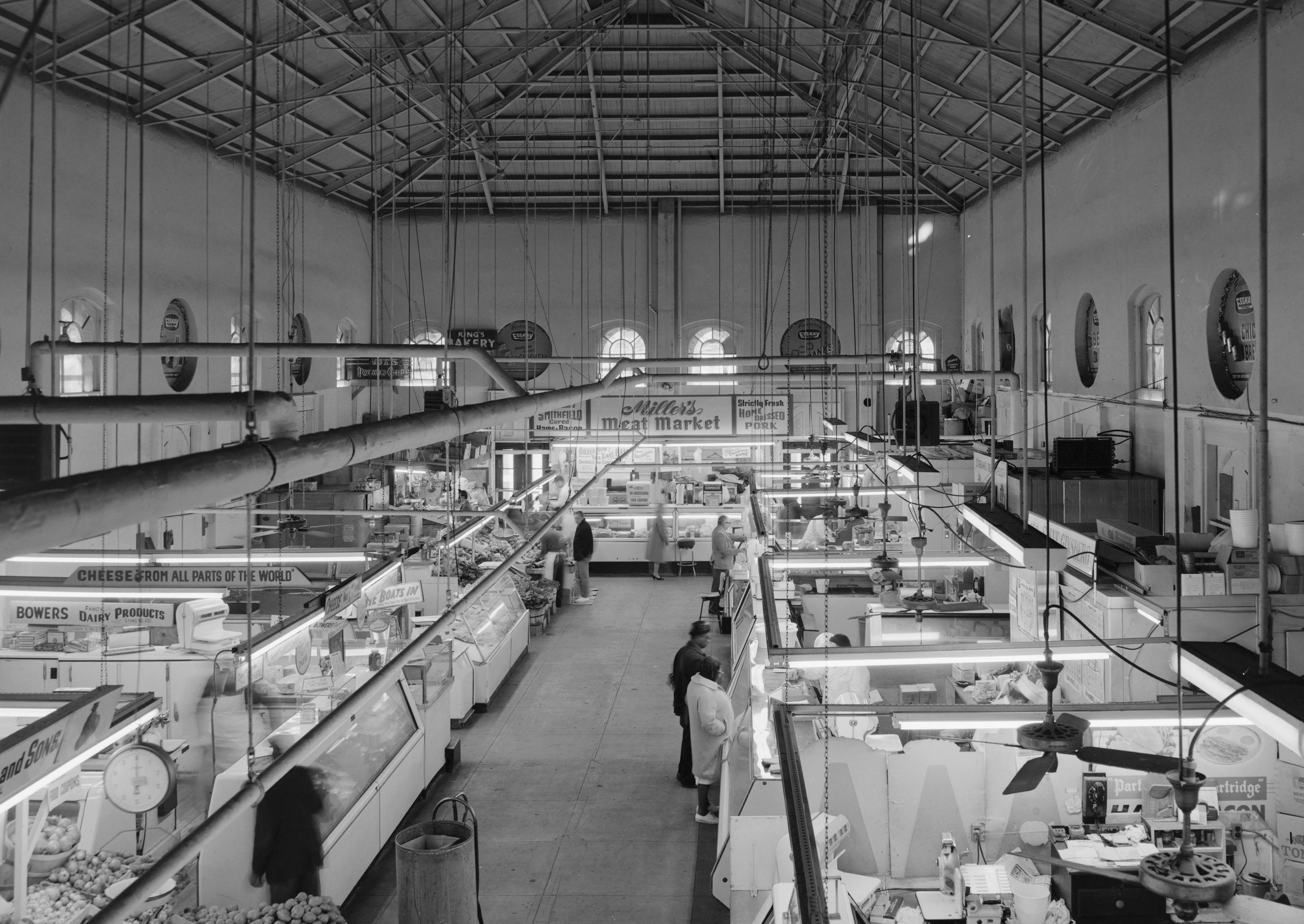
Interior of Eastern Market

The current Eastern Market was designed by Adolf Cluss and was in continuous operation as a public market from 1873 until April 30, 2007. It was the first in a larger city-owned public market system, initiated to urbanize Washington, make orderly provision for the distribution of goods to its residents, and serve as a magnet to draw residents. The Market was expanded in 1908 with the addition of the Center and North Halls designed by Snowden Ashford. At the start of the 20th century, the Eastern Market was recognized as the unofficial "town center" of Capitol Hill. It is the last of the city's public markets still in operation.

The market nearly closed because of competition from grocery store chains and a decline in neighborhood investment. Local residents fought to keep it open, and the area has since been revitalized. Eastern Market continues to host a thriving farmers' market. Fresh meats, baked goods and cheeses are sold from indoor stalls, and fresh produce is sold outside along the tent-covered sidewalk. Artisans and antiques dealers also sell their goods outside the market on weekends, making Eastern Market a popular stop for locals as well as tourists. The Market 5 Gallery organizes art shows, music and theater performances, and craft sales at the Eastern Market.

=== 2007 fire and aftermath ===
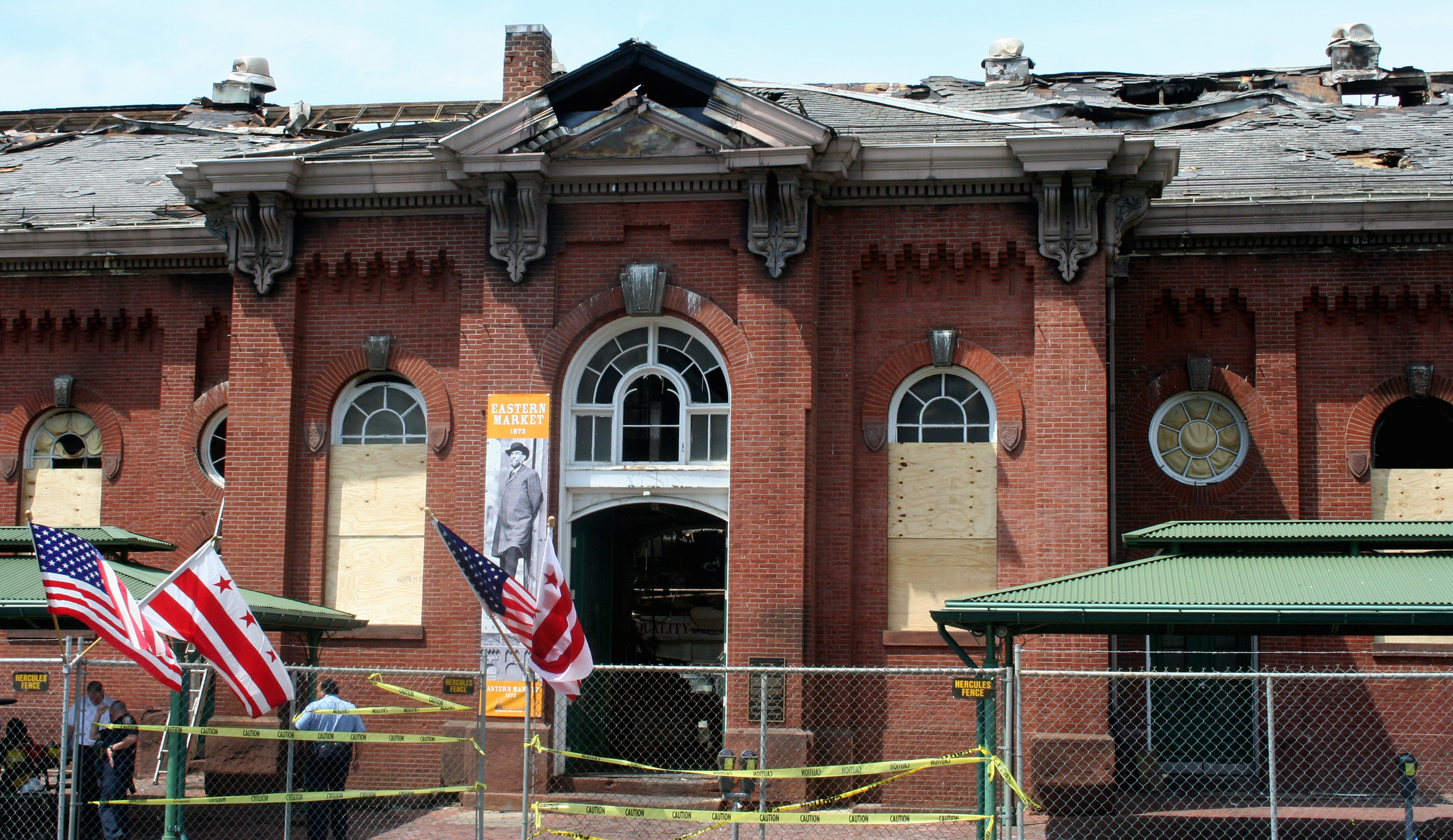
The Eastern Market was damaged by a three-alarm fire in 2007

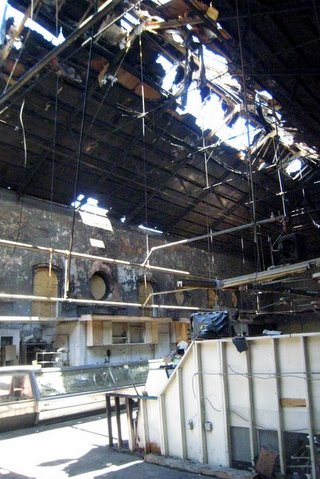
Fire damage inside the South Hall

Eastern Market was badly damaged by an early-morning 3-alarm fire on April 30, 2007. The heaviest damage was in the South Hall of the market, the portion occupied by vendors' stalls, where the roof suffered a partial collapse. The Washington Post has described the South Hall as "gutted so badly that birds can now fly in through the front windows and out the back ones." Following the fire, Washington, D.C., Mayor Adrian Fenty promised to rebuild the market. The outdoor weekend market was disrupted but never closed. Many of the food vendors re-opened for business within weeks of the fire, selling their products outside of the building. In August 2007, the city completed a temporary market annex, known as the "East Hall," on the opposite side of 7th Street, on the grounds of Hine Junior High School. This housed the vendors until the reopening of the market building, with a ribbon-cutting on June 26, 2009. The Washington, D.C., Fire and Emergency Services Department determined officially that the fire originated outside of the Eastern Market between a dumpster and the exterior of the west wall, and that the fire was caused by an electrical failure on the electric supply wire for a nearby trash compactor. However, former D.C. fire investigators Gerald Pennington and Greg Bowyer have suggested the fire was deliberately set by suspect Joel Ramos.

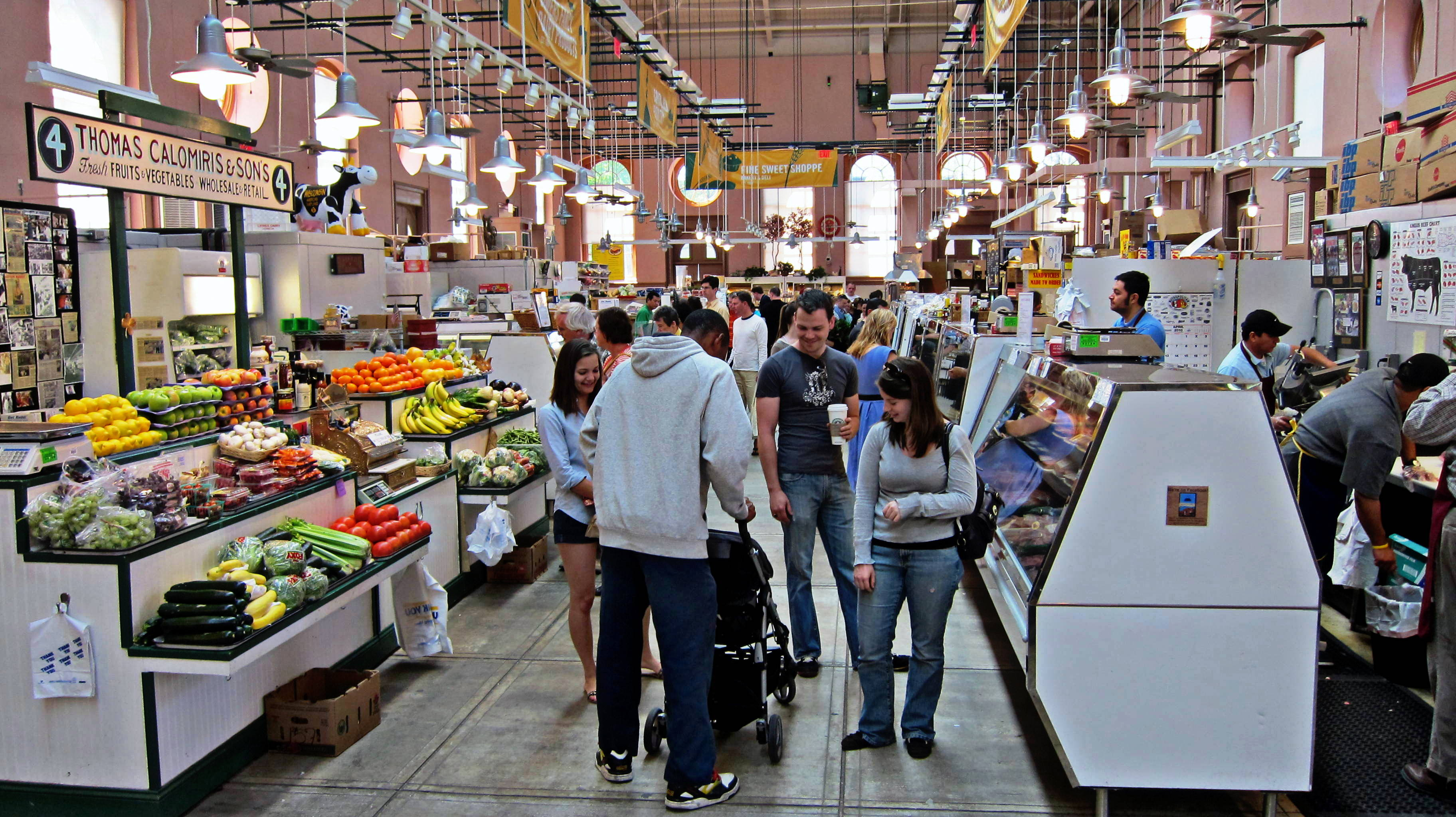
Interior of Eastern Market in 2010

Eastern Market reopened its doors on June 26, 2009, after two years of reconstruction work. On March 9, 2010, the renovation of the market received the Outstanding Project Award from the Structural Engineering Association of Metropolitan Washington in April. The Market has already received an "Honor Award" in the design category and has been recognized as a National Finalist by the American Counsel of Engineering Companies of Metropolitan Washington. The restoration process was a detailed and challenging effort to re-purpose and salvage various components of the critically damaged building. Among many innovative improvements, the historic roof was restored and state of the art equipment was installed. The design allowed the previously hidden historic skylight to be reintroduced as a prominent architectural feature of the new Eastern Market South Hall. Renovation was overseen by the Department of Real Estate Services and coordinated with Robert Silman Associates and Quinn Evans Architects. Mayor Adrian Fenty moved to have 7th Street, in front of the market, closed to vehicle traffic on the weekends to function as a "pedestrian plaza."

== See also ==
- O Street Market
