= The Deer (film) =

- Directed by: Masud Kimiai
- Screenplay by: Masud Kimiai
- Produced by: Mehdi Missaghieh
- Starring: Behrouz Vossoughi; Faramarz Gharibian; Nosrat Partovi; Garshasb Raoufi; Enayat Bakhshi; Parviz Fanizadeh
- Cinematography: Nemat Haghighi
- Edited by: Abbas Ganjavi
- Music by: Esfandiar Monfaredzadeh
- Production company: Misaghye Studio
- Release date: 1974
- Running time: 120 minutes
- Country: Iran
- Language: Persian

The Deer (Persian: گوزن‌ها, romanized: Gavaznhā) is a 1974 Iranian drama film directed by Masoud Kimiai and produced by Mehdi Missaghieh. It was among the most acclaimed Persian movies before the Iranian revolution and starred Behrouz Vossoughi, the most famous Iranian male actor at the time.

== Plot ==
The history of the film is based on the renewal of an old friendship happening in unforeseen and strange circumstances. Sayyid Rasool (Note: "Sayyid Rasool" is a first name. Sayyid is an Islamic honorific. Iranian registration laws consider it part of the first name.) is a drug addict working small jobs in a theatre to pay for his heavy addiction. One day he is visited by an old friend, Ghodrat, for whom he was a role model and protector when they were teenagers. Ghodrat has just been shot by the police when an armed robbery went wrong and is now looking for a safe place to lie low for a while. Hence, he comes to stay with the only person that he could trust, Rasool. However, what he sees is miles away from the Rasool that he knew and had in mind. Although they are both happy to find each other after so many years, Ghodrat is completely shocked to see Rasool, once the ruler of the high school yards and neighbourhoods, an addict.

Rasool is very emotional to see Ghodrat. He is proud to see that some people from the old days still believe in him and are loyal to him, though he seems ashamed of what he has become. Rasool helps Ghodrat by hiding him in his place, a small room containing only a bed and a samovar that is representative of the extreme poverty in which Rasool lives. They talk about the years since they had been separated. Ghodrat explains that he has become a professional thief and Rasool tells a story of how he had become a heroin addict after having served only two months in a jail for minor offenses. "The drug was distributed by cleaners in the jail," Rasool says. Once released, he found no opportunity in life because of lack of social support, poverty and "drug dealers being everywhere." He became a full-time heroin user after using the drug during alcohol- and drug-fueled parties with local drug dealers.

During the few days that Ghodrat is staying with Rasool, he also meets with Rasool's roommate Fati, a poor but beautiful, hard-working, and romantic girl from the old days, who was once in love with Rasool. Fati is now completely disillusioned about the future and considers Rasool as a brother and life companion. Ghodrat wants to revive Rasool's pride by reminding him of who he was long ago and how being the role model that he was helped him not to fall into drug or alcohol addiction during all those years.

Rasool tries to justify his failed life by blaming it on a lack of social and parental support, but this leads to an honest but tough exchange about the circumstances that led them to their current stations in life. The discussion becomes so heated and emotional that the two start punching the wall in a show of remaining physical and mental strength. "It is too late," Rasool says. When Ghodrat tries to talk him out of his current state of mind, Rasool responds angrily by saying that being a thief is no better than being a drug addict. In full denial, he thinks that Ghodrat has no right to lecture him about life as "Ghodrat is a thief and doing things against the law."

Ghodrat also witnesses how deeply rooted poverty and a lack of basic education affect the daily life of every neighbour in the area. He and Rasool continue to have more meaningful discussions about life, education and opportunity, but no conclusion is really achieved. They are both so sorry about how they have become that they cry at the first opportunity to have an evening meal with aragh, an anise-based alcoholic drink. Ghodrat knows that his time there is limited and that he must find a way out.

The police come for Ghodrat after his picture had appeared in local newspapers as a "wanted and dangerous man"; presumably, one of the local people had informed the police of his whereabouts. The police besiege the house for several hours, but Ghodrat does not surrender. Rasool arrives home to discover the escalating situation, fearing Ghodrat's death at the hands of the large police force. He implores the police chief to allow him to enter the house in order to persuade Ghodrat to surrender. Feeling responsible for the danger in which his friend is now involved, Ghodrat beseeches Rasool not to intervene and to go away before he is hurt. However, Rasool chooses to remain with Ghodrat. He runs away from the police and is shot in the shoulder but eventually manages to get into the room with Ghodrat.

The two friends reflect on the nearly certain death they are facing. After a few minutes, the building comes under heavy fire, but Rasool stays with Ghodrat when a final police raid results in both men being killed by an explosion. Just before the raid, Rasool looks at Ghodrat and says, "I prefer to die by a bullet here in my room with you being there rather than alone under a bridge in a few years' time." This is a show of loyalty to his friend as well as an expression of his despair and hopelessness.

== Cast ==
- Behrouz Vossoughi as Sayyid Rasool
- Faramarz Gharibian as Ghodrat
- Nosrat Partovi as Fati
- Garshasb Raoufi as Drug Dealer
- Enayat Bakhshi as Landlord
- Parviz Fanizadeh as Mohammad

== Socioeconomic context ==
Some critics believe that The Deer is a deeply meaningful snapshot of life under Mohammad Reza Pahlavi, whose White Revolution drove uneducated and unskilled farmers into Iranian cultural and industrial cities, and how that socioeconomic revolution was inefficiently managed by the government. A majority of peasant migrants ended up jobless, and many became drug addicts living in overcrowded hostels. Meanwhile, a minority of the population, with access to wealth and education, reached meaningful social and economical status. This caused a layered society with a small middle class and significant social inequalities that grew significantly beginning in the late 1960s. This trend contributed to a widening gap between the richest and most educated 10% of the population and the 90% of the people who were poor and uneducated. This disparity occurred all across the country but was most pronounced in large cities such as Tehran, Shiraz, Esfahan, Abadan and other large provincial cities. The Iranian Revolution of 1978–79 caused the overthrow of the Shah's regime.

The film was playing during the Cinema Rex fire on 19 August 1978, which is believed to have been a terrorist attack.
