= Lou Castagnola =

American long-distance runner

Personal information
- Nationality: American
- Born: July 5, 1936 Raleigh, North Carolina, U.S.
- Died: December 11, 2012 (aged 76) Bethesda, Maryland, U.S.

Sport
- Sport: Track, long-distance running
- Event: Marathon
- College team: Virginia Tech

Achievements and titles
- Personal bests: 2-mile: 9:14.0; 10,000m: 31:02.4; Marathon: 2:17:17

Louis Craig "Lou" Castagnola (born July 5, 1936) was an American long-distance runner who competed for Virginia Tech in cross country and track before specializing in the marathon throughout the 1960s. He won the Washington's Birthday Marathon in 1963, 1967, and 1968. He ran his fastest marathon at the 1967 Boston Marathon, when he placed fourth overall in a time of 2:17:17.

== Running career ==
=== Collegiate ===
Lou Castagnola attended Virginia Tech, where he competed in cross country and track. In cross country, he was the Southern Conference Champion in 1959 and 1960, winning the 4-mile race in 20:35 and 21:06, respectively. In track, he specialized in the mile and 2-mile. In academics, he earned a degree in Electrical Engineering.

=== Post-collegiate ===
After college, Castagnola joined the Washington Running Club, where he trained for the marathon. He set the course record for the Washington's Birthday Marathon in 1967 with a time of 2:22:45, after having won the same marathon on two previous occasions. He was also successful in shorter distances, and on May 20, 1967, he won the men's 2-mile at the DC AAU track meet in 9:14.0. In 1968, he was one of several elite distance runners who were physiologically tested by researcher David Costill. After having just run his career-best 2:17 marathon in Boston, Castagnola's vertical leap was only 11.5 inches, which surprised researchers. After three years of relative inactivity since he stopped running, he was tested by Costill again in 1971, and in spite of his vVO2max capacity having deteriorated by more than a third, his vertical leap had increased to 20.3 inches.
