= 8th Berlin International Film Festival =

1958 film festival in West Berlin, Germany

- Festival poster
- Location: West Berlin, Germany
- Founded: 1951
- Awards: Golden Bear: Wild Strawberries
- Festival date: 27 June – 8 July 1958
- Website: Website

Berlin International Film Festival chronology
- 9th 7th

The 8th annual Berlin International Film Festival was held from 27 June to 8 July 1958 with the Zoo Palast as the main venue. The festival was opened by then West Berlin's newly elected mayor Willy Brandt.

The Golden Bear was awarded to Wild Strawberries directed by Ingmar Bergman.

== Juries ==
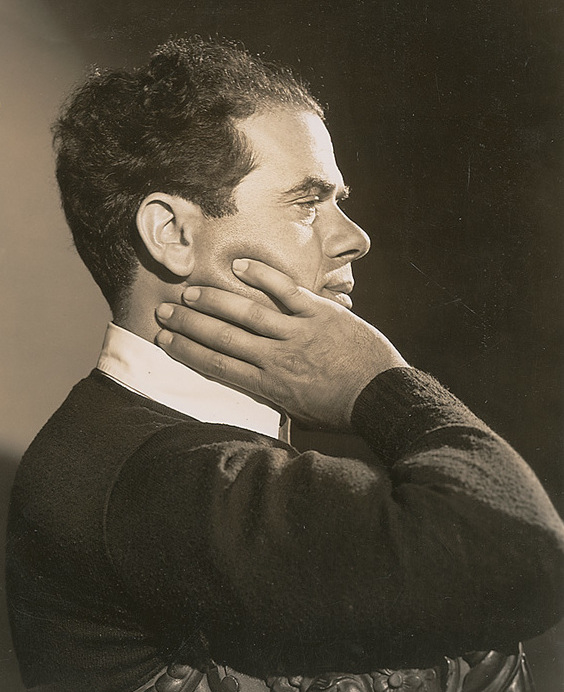
Frank Capra, Jury President

The following people were announced as being on the jury for the festival:

=== Main Competition ===
- Frank Capra, American filmmaker and producer - Jury President
- Joaquim Novais Teixeira, Portuguese politician, writer and film critic
- Jean Marais, French actor
- Paul Rotha, British filmmaker
- L. B. Rao Indian
- Duilio Coletti, Italian filmmaker
- Michiko Tanaka, Japanese actress
- Gerhard T. Buchholz, West-German filmmaker and producer
- Willy Haas, West-German writer
- Gerhard Lamprecht, West-German filmmaker and producer
- Leopold Reitemeister, West-German art historian

=== Documentary and Short Film Competition ===
- Wali Eddine Sameh, Egyptian filmmaker - Jury President
- Günther Birkenfeld, West-German producer
- Werner Eisbrenner, West-German composer and conductor
- Adolf Forter, Swiss producer
- Anton Koolhaas, Dutch writer
- Jan Olof Olsson, Swedish writer
- Edward Toner, Irish co-founder of the Irish Film Centre

== Official Sections ==
=== Main Competition ===
The following films were in competition for the Golden Bear award:

English title	Original title	Director(s)	Production Country
Anna of Brooklyn	Anna di Brooklyn	Vittorio De Sica and Carlo Lastricati	Italy
A Party in Hell	شب‌ نشینی در جهنم	Samuel Khachikian and Mushegh Sarvarian	Iran
Ash Wednesday	Miércoles de ceniza	Roberto Gavaldón	Mexico
A Time to Love and a Time to Die		Douglas Sirk	United States, West Germany
Cairo Station	باب الحديد	Youssef Chahine	Egypt
The Defiant Ones		Stanley Kramer	United States
The Devil's Pass	La Passe du diable	Jacques Dupont and Pierre Schoendoerffer	France
Djajaprana		Kotot Soekardi	Indonesia
Do Aankhen Barah Haath	दो आँखें बारह हाथ	Rajaram Vankudre Shantaram	India
Girls in Uniform	Mädchen in Uniform	Géza von Radványi	West Germany, France
Ice Cold in Alex		J. Lee Thompson	United Kingdom
It Happened in Broad Daylight	Es geschah am hellichten Tag	Ladislao Vajda	Switzerland, West Germany, Spain
The Girls Are Willing	Guld og grønne skove	Gabriel Axel	Denmark
Jun'ai Monogatari	純愛物語	Tadashi Imai	Japan
The Law Is the Law	La loi, c'est la loi	Christian-Jaque	France, Italy
Let's Make the Impossible!	¡Viva lo imposible!	Rafael Gil	Spain
Miriam		William Markus	Finland
Oi paranomoi	Οι παράνομοι	Nikos Koundouros	Greece
Strange Gods	Los dioses ajenos	Román Viñoly Barreto	Argentina
The Temptress and the Monk	白夜の妖女	Eisuke Takizawa	Japan
The Tenth of May	Der 10. Mai	Franz Schnyder	Switzerland
Una cita de amor		Emilio Fernández	Mexico
Ut av mørket		Arild Brinchmann	Norway
Wild Is the Wind		George Cukor	United States
Wild Strawberries	Smultronstället	Ingmar Bergman	Sweden
The Witch Beneath the Sea	Tumulto de Paixões	Zygmunt Sulistrowski	Brazil, United States

=== Documentary and Short Film Competition ===
English title	Original title	Director(s)	Production Country
Dream Road of the World	Traumstraße der Welt	Hans Domnick	West Germany
Glass	Glas	Bert Haanstra	Netherlands
Jaguar		Sean Graham	Ghana
Königin im Frauenreich		H. Zickendraht	Switzerland
La lunga raccolta		Lionetto Fabbri	Italy
Perri		N. Paul Kenworthy and Ralph Wright	United States
Trans Canada Summer		Ronald Dick	Canada

== Official Awards ==
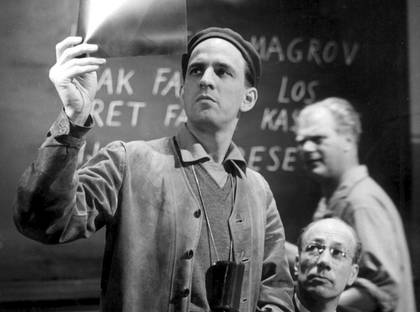
Ingmar Bergman, winner of the Golden Bear at the event.

The following prizes were awarded by the Jury:

=== Main Competition ===
- Golden Bear: Wild Strawberries by Ingmar Bergman
- Silver Bear for Best Director: Tadashi Imai for Jun'ai Monogatari
- Silver Bear for Best Actress: Anna Magnani for Wild Is the Wind
- Silver Bear for Best Actor: Sidney Poitier for The Defiant Ones
- Silver Bear Extraordinary Jury Prize: Do Aankhen Barah Haath by Rajaram Vankudre Shantaram

=== Documentary and Short Film Competition ===
- Golden Bear (Documentaries): Perri by N. Paul Kenworthy and Ralph Wright
- Silver Bear (Documentaries): Dream Road of the World by Hans Domnick
- Short Film Golden Bear: La lunga raccolta by Lionetto Fabbri
- Silver Bear for Best Short Film:
  - Glass by Bert Haanstra
  - Königin im Frauenreich by H. Zickendraht

== Independent Awards ==
=== FIPRESCI Award ===
- Ice Cold in Alex by J. Lee Thompson
- Smultronstället by Ingmar Bergman
  - Special mention: Jaguar by Sean Graham

=== OCIC Award ===
- Do Aankhen Barah Haath by Rajaram Vankudre Shantaram
  - Special Mention (Berlin Senate Education Prize): La Passe du diable by Jacques Dupont and Pierre Schoendoerffer
