= Western Market (Washington, D.C.) =

Coordinates: 38.9005°N 77.0459°W

Western Market was a market located in the city of Washington, D.C. It originally opened in 1802 and closed in 1961. The area near where the original market was located is currently operating as a food hall under the same name, with its logo referencing the year the original Western Market opened.

== History ==
=== Original Market ===
Western Market was one of the three marketplaces planned in Pierre L'Enfant's plan for Washington, D.C. It also included Center Market and Eastern Market. It was opened in 1802 on 20th and H Streets, in the block between H and I Streets NW, 20th and 21st Streets NW, and Pennsylvania Avenue NW. This market closed in 1856.

=== Second Market ===
After the Original Market's closing in 1856, Western Market moved to a new location at 21st and K Streets NW where it reopened in 1873. The new building was a red-brick construction in an "L" shape. This market closed in 1961 and was demolished to make room for an office building to be built on that block. This left Eastern Market to be the only one of the original three markets (Western, Center, and Eastern) left open.

== Appearance ==
=== Original Market ===
It is unknown what the market located at 20th and H Streets looked like.

=== Second Market ===
The second building of Western Market (located at 21st and K Streets) was large and made of brick. One side was higher than the other. It was similar in style to the current Eastern Market building.

== Purpose ==
In Pierre L'Enfant's original city plan, the three markets (Western, Center, and Eastern) existed to supplement existing markets in Alexandria and Georgetown. Western Market had similar products and purposes to the current Eastern Market.

== See also ==
- Eastern Market
- Center Market
