= A Party in Hell =

- Directed by: Samuel Khachikian; Mushegh Sarvarian
- Written by: Mehdi Maysaghieh
- Starring: Reza Arham Sadr
- Cinematography: Enayatallah Famin
- Edited by: Jamshid Sabuki
- Release date: 1957
- Running time: 120 minutes
- Country: Iran
- Language: Persian

A Party in Hell (Persian: Shab-neshini dar Jahannam) is a 1957 Iranian film directed by Samuel Khachikian and Mushegh Sarvarian. It was entered into the 8th Berlin International Film Festival.

== Plot ==
Hajji Jabbar is a greedy businessman. His daughter is in love with her cousin, but he forces her to marry a rich old man. Hajji Jabbar becomes sick and he sees the grim reaper who takes him to visit hell. When Hajji Jabbar awakes he tries to redeem himself.

== Cast ==
- Reza Arham Sadr, as Ahmad
- Ebrahim Bagheri
- Mehdi Reisfirooz
- Rufia
- Ezzatollah Vosoogh, as Haji Jabbar
- Ali Zandi
