= Sean Graham =

American athlete

Personal information
- Nationality: American
- Born: March 6, 1980 (age 46) Washington County, Minnesota, U.S.

Sport
- Sport: Track
- Events: 1500 metres, mile, 5000 meters
- College team: William & Mary

Achievements and titles
- Personal bests: 1500m: 3:40.37; Mile: 3:58.4; 3000m: 7:46.9; 2-mile: 8:27.64; 5000m: 13:23.50

Sean Graham (born March 6, 1980) is an American retired track runner who specialized in middle-distance and long-distance disciplines. Graham was a product of Stillwater High, whose coach Scott Christensen helped make a nationally recognized track history for the high school. Then he ran for William & Mary, after which he ran as a full-time professional for Nike's Farm Team and subsequently for Oregon Track Club. Graham qualified for two US Olympic Trials in 2004 and 2008, although he ran the trial only in 2004 when he finished 11th in the 5000 metres. An injury a week before the 2008 trial prevented him from taking the last chance in his running career to earn a place in the US Olympic team for the 2008 Summer Olympics.

== Running career ==
=== High school ===
Graham attended Stillwater Area High School, before which he did not have any cross country or track experience. Stillwater happened to have an extraordinary generation of middle-distance and long-distance runners at the time Graham attended. In a remarkable twist of fate, Graham's Stillwater team mate Luke Watson would run against Graham at the 2004 Olympic Trials in the 5000-meter race. In 1997, the Stillwater cross country team was ranked number one in the United States. Stillwater also became the only high school track team whose alumni produced more than three sub-four minute mile runners, who all happened to have been coached in high school by Stillwater's cross country and track coach Scott Christensen before he became a science teacher at the same school.

=== Collegiate ===
Graham studied and ran with the College of William & Mary under coach Andy Gerard along with fellow track team mate Ed Moran, who also pursued track professionally after college. Graham graduated in 2003 as an All-American, the same year he placed sixth in the 5000 metres race at the NCAA Men's Division I Outdoor Track and Field Championships.

=== Post-collegiate ===
In 2006, Graham and Bernard Lagat were selected to represent the United States at the USA vs. Great Britain vs. China track competition held in Lignano Sabbiadoro, Italy, where Graham placed fourth in the 3000 metres running a time of 7:46.9.

After running for Nike's Farm Team based in Palo Alto, California, Graham began running for Oregon Track Club where he competed and trained with athletes including Nick Symmonds. On May 10, 2007, Graham ran a mile track race in 3:58.4 (min:sec), one of only thirteen athletes to have broken the sub-4 mile barrier in the country that year.

=== Coaching career ===
Graham is coached the Men's distance coach at the University of Kentucky in Lexington, Kentucky. Under Graham's direction Keffri Neal claimed the 2014 NCAA 800 meter Bronze Medal. In addition, Graham has coached 6 individual SEC Champions from the 800 meters to the 10,000 meters, including Matt Hillenbrand to two SEC titles and was a mile and 1,500m All-American. In 2016, Graham coached Kentucky native Jacob Thomson to wins in both the SEC 5k and 10k Championships at the 2016 SEC Outdoor Championships. Thomson was the SEC Silver Medalist in the indoor 5k in 2016. He was an NCAA Championships qualifier in cross country.

Graham is currently the Head Coach at American University and is in his seventh year at the helm of the AU Cross Country and Track & Field program in the fall of 2023.
