= Samuel Khachikian =

Iranian film director (1923–2001)

- ساموئل خاچیکیان; Սամուէլ Խաչիկեան
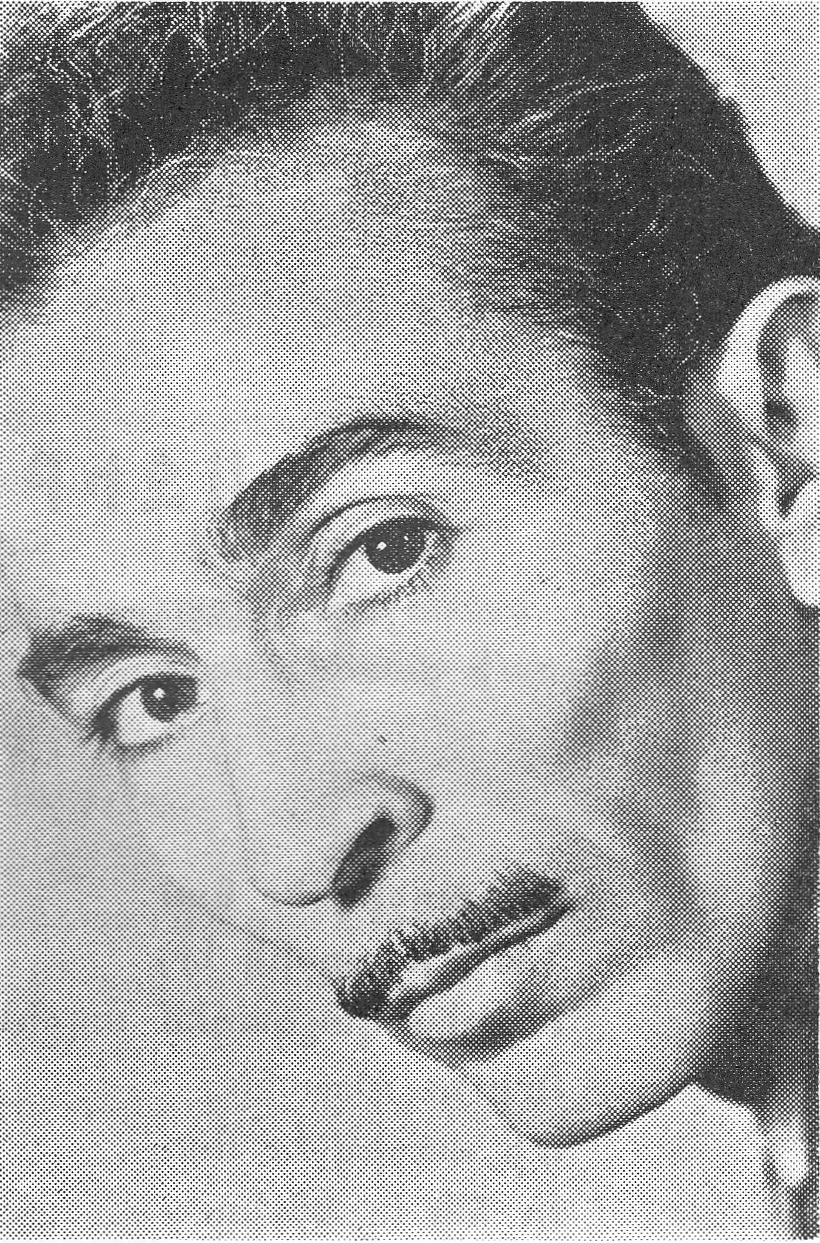
- Born: October 21, 1923; Tabriz, Iran
- Died: October 22, 2001 (aged 78); Tehran, Iran
- Resting place: Burastan Cemetery, Khavaran, Tehran
- Other name: Iran's Hitchcock
- Occupations: Film director, screenwriter, author, film editor
- Years active: 1951–1994

Samuel Khachikian (Armenian: Սամուէլ Խաչիկեան Armenian pronunciation: [sɑm'vɛl χɑtʃʰik'jɑn]; Persian: ساموئل خاچیکیان; October 21, 1923 – October 22, 2001) was an Iranian film director, screenwriter, author, and film editor of Armenian descent. He was one of the most influential figures of Iranian cinema and was nicknamed "Iran's Hitchcock".

== Biography ==
Born 1923 in Tabriz to a family of Armenian immigrants. Khachikian's father escaped the Armenian genocide in 1915 and settled in Tabriz. His mother admired cinema and the arts and often took her children to the theater. Samuel Khachikian published his first poem "The Prison" in the Armenian newspaper Alik when he was nine. Five years later, he gave his first stage performance in Tabriz in a play titled "Seville". He completed his education in History and Journalism, and wrote eight plays which went on stage not only in different cities of Iran, but also in Los Angeles, San Francisco and Greece.

Khachikian made his first film in 1953, titled Return. He was among the first and few directors who used the decoupage technique on the film set, preparing the complete shooting script in advance. The success of his works attracted a lot of attention to the advantages of this filmmaking approach. As an innovative filmmaker, he turned the production of murder mysteries and noir thrillers into a popular new wave in the Iranian filmmaking. He made the first ever movie trailer in the history of Iranian cinema for the movie A Girl From Shira in 1954. Subsequent films, such as The Strike and The Eagles, were box office hits of their times.

The 1956 film A Party in Hell directed by Khachikian was entered into the 8th Berlin International Film Festival.

Khachikian's brother Souren Khachikian was also heavily involved in the production of his films. Souren's grandson Ara H. Keshishian is working as a film editor in Hollywood. Samuel Khachikian's son Edwin Khachikian is also a director.

He died on October 22, 2001, at the age of seventy-eight in Tehran, Iran.

== Filmography ==
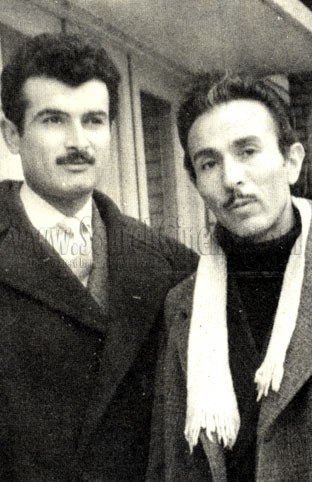
Samuel Khachikian (right), 1954

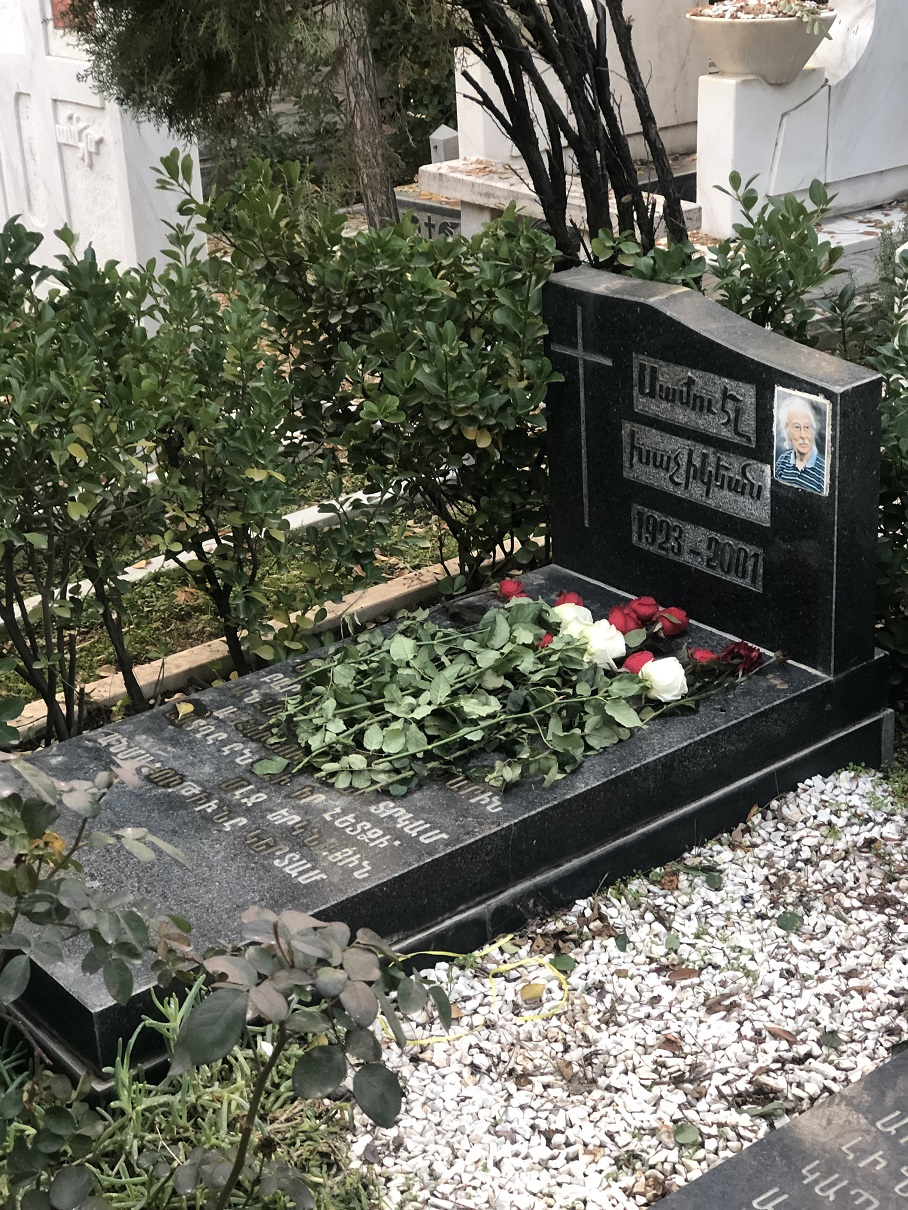
Khachikian's grave at Burastan Cemetery, Khavaran

- 1953: Return (Bazgasht)
- 1954: A Girl From Shiraz (Dokhtari az Shiraz)
- 1955: Crossroad of Events (Persian: چهارراه حوادث, romanized: Chahar Rah-e Havades)
- 1955: Blood and Honor (Khoon va Sharaf)
- 1956: A Party in Hell (Shab-Neshini dar Jahannam)
- 1958: A Messenger From Heaven (Ghasede Behesht)
- 1958: Storm in Our Town (Persian: طوفان در شهر ما, romanized: Toofan dar Shahr-e Ma)
- 1959: The Hill of Love (Tappeye Eshgh)
- 1961: One Step to Death (Yak Qadam ta Marg)
- 1961: The Midnight Terror (Faryad-e Nimeshab)
- 1962: Anxiety (Delhoreh)
- 1964: The Strike (Zarbat)
- 1965: Delirium (Sarsam)
- 1966, Rebellion (1966 film) (Esyan)
- 1966, Never Without Love (Ba Eshgh Hargez)
- 1966: Khodahafez Tehran (Farewell to Tehran)
- 1967: The Tiger of Mazandaran (Babr-e Mazandaran)
- 1968: White Hell (Jahannam-e Safid)
- 1968: I Cried Too (Man Ham Gerye Kardam)
- 1968: Hengameh
- 1969: The Cry of the Storm (Narya Tufan)
- 1970: Yalda Night Story (Ghesseye Shab-e Yalda)
- 1971: The Glass Wall (Divar-e Shishayi)
- 1973: The Kiss on Blood Lips
- 1975: Death in the Rain (Marg dar Baran)
- 1976: Agitation (Ezterab)
- 1978: The Shark of the South (Koose-ye Jonoob)
- 1979: Explosion (Enfejar)
- 1984: Eagles (Oghab-ha)
- 1985: Cheetah (Yoozpalang)
- 1990: The Herald (Chavush)
- 1992: A Man in the Mirror (Mard-i dar Ayena)
- 1994: Bluff
- 2001: Doubt (unfinished due to Khachikian's illness)
