= List of Disney live-action shorts =

The Walt Disney Company, commonly known as Disney, is an American multinational mass media and entertainment conglomerate that is headquartered at the Walt Disney Studios complex in Burbank, California. Since 1922, the founder of the company, Walt Disney, and the company has produced live-action motion picture shorts. This list only includes shorts which were initially released as individual shorts, which excludes the shorts that were originally released as part of Disney features in the 1950s and later re-released as individual shorts. This list also does not include shorts that do not contain any original stock footage. This list includes shorts with both live action and animation only if the majority of the shorts contain live action. This list does not include any trailers as they are usually edited from the features they are supposed to promote.

Key to the colors used below
Type of film
Documentary films
True-Life Adventures
People & Places
Related to Theme parks
Educational film shown in school

== Theatrical ==
=== Silent era ===
Series	Title	Date	Director	DVD Release	Notes
—N/a	Tommy Tucker's Tooth	December 6, 1922	Walt Disney	—N/a	Animated insert less than 12 second.
—N/a	Martha	1923	Walt Disney	—N/a	Song-O-Reel
—N/a	Clara Cleans Her Teeth	1926	Walt Disney	—N/a	Animated insert less than 12 second.

Note: Some of the Alice Comedies shorts were primarily live-action but for consistency's sake they are included on the list of Disney animated shorts.

=== Sound era ===
Series	Title	Date	Director	DVD Release	Notes
—N/a	Stormy, the Thoroughbred	March 12, 1954	Larry Lansburgh	—N/a	First film distributed by Buena Vista Film Distribution Company, Inc.
—N/a	Cow Dog	November 6, 1956	Larry Lansburgh	—N/a	Nominated for the Academy Award for Best Live Action Short (Two Reel)
—N/a	The Tattooed Police Horse	December 18, 1964	Larry Lansburgh	—N/a	Released with Emil and the Detectives
—N/a	Run, Appaloosa, Run	July 29, 1966	Larry Lansburgh	Disney Movie Club	Released with Lt. Robin Crusoe, USN
—N/a	Hang Your Hat on the Wind	June 11, 1969	Larry Lansburgh	—N/a	Originally an episode of Walt Disney's Wonderful World of Color., Released with Rascal
—N/a	Dad, Can I Borrow the Car?	September 30, 1970	Ward Kimball	Disney Movie Club	Stop-motion animation and live-action short film. Released with a Son of Flubber re-release.
—N/a	Frankenweenie	December 12, 1984	Tim Burton	The Nightmare Before Christmas Special Edition, Collector's Edition, and Blu-ray 3D and Frankenweenie	Released theatrically in the UK with Baby: Secret of the Lost Legend. Remade as feature length stop-motion animation film in 2012.

=== Documentaries ===
==== 1940s ====
Series	Title	Date	Director	DVD Release	Notes
True-Life Adventures	Seal Island	December 21, 1948	James Algar	Walt Disney Legacy Collection - True Life Adventures, volume 2: Lands of Exploration	First True-Life Adventure film. Won the 1949 Academy Award for Best Live Action Short (Two Reel)

==== 1950s ====
Series	Title	Date	Director	DVD Release	Notes
True-Life Adventures	In Beaver Valley (a.k.a. Beaver Valley)	July 19, 1950	James Algar	Walt Disney Legacy Collection - True Life Adventures, volume 1: Wonders of the World	Released with Treasure Island. Won the Academy Award for Best Live Action Short (Two Reel)
True-Life Adventures	Nature's Half Acre	July 28, 1951	James Algar	Walt Disney Legacy Collection - True Life Adventures, volume 4: Nature's Mysteries	Released with Alice in Wonderland. Won the Academy Award for Best Live Action Short (Two Reel)
True-Life Adventures	The Olympic Elk	February 13, 1952	James Algar	Walt Disney Legacy Collection - True Life Adventures, volume 3: Creatures of the Wild	Released with a Snow White and the Seven Dwarfs re-release
True-Life Adventures	Water Birds	June 26, 1952	Ben Sharpsteen	Walt Disney Legacy Collection - True Life Adventures, volume 1: Wonders of the World and The Rescuers	Released with The Story of Robin Hood and His Merrie Men. Won the Academy Award for Best Live Action Short (Two Reel)
True-Life Adventures	Bear Country	February 5, 1953	James Algar	Walt Disney Legacy Collection - True Life Adventures, volume 3: Creatures of the Wild	Released with Peter Pan. Won the Academy Award for Best Live Short (Two Reel)
People & Places	The Alaskan Eskimo	February 18, 1953	James Algar	—N/a	First People & Places film. Won the Academy Award for Best Documentary Short
True-Life Adventures	Prowlers of the Everglades	July 23, 1953	James Algar	Walt Disney Legacy Collection - True Life Adventures, volume 1: Wonders of the World	Released with The Sword and the Rose. Last film distributed by RKO Radio Pictures
People & Places	Siam	December 24, 1954	Ralph Wright	—N/a	Nominated for the Academy Award for Best Live Action Short (Two Reel)
Wildlife Adventure	Arizona Sheepdog	May 25, 1955	Larry Lansburgh	—N/a	Released with Davy Crockett, King of the Wild Frontier. Later released on 16mm as Nicky and Rock - Working Sheep Dogs.
People & Places	Switzerland	June 16, 1955	Ben Sharpsteen	—N/a	Released with Lady and the Tramp. Nominated for the Academy Award for Best Live Action Short (Two Reel)
People & Places	Men Against the Arctic	December 21, 1955	Winston Hibler	—N/a	Released with both The Littlest Outlaw and The Great Locomotive Chase. Won the Academy Award for Best Documentary Short
Foreign Nature Documentary	Emperor Penguins	October 13, 1955	Maris Marret	—N/a	Frence produced short acquired for distribution
People & Places	Sardinia	November 15, 1956	Ben Sharpsteen	—N/a	
People & Places	Disneyland U.S.A.	December 20, 1956	Hamilton S. Luske	Walt Disney Treasures: Disneyland-Secrets, Stories and Magic	Released with Westward Ho, the Wagons!.
People & Places	Samoa	December 25, 1956	Ben Sharpsteen	—N/a	Nominated for the Academy Award for Best Live Action Short (Two Reel)
People & Places	The Blue Man of Morocco	February 14, 1957	Ralph Wright	—N/a	Released with a Snow White and the Seven Dwarfs re-release
People & Places	Lapland	February 14, 1957	Ben Sharpsteen	—N/a	Released with a Snow White and the Seven Dwarfs re-release
Social & Cultural	Alaskan Sled Dog	July 3, 1957	Ben Sharpsteen	—N/a	
Wildlife Adventure	The Wetback Hound	June 19, 1957	Larry Lansburgh	—N/a	Released with Johnny Tremain. Won the Academy Award for Best Live Action Short
Foreign Wildlife Film	Niok	August 28, 1957	Edmond Sechan	—N/a	Frence produced short acquired for distribution and Released on double bill with Perri.
People & Places	Portugal	December 25, 1957	Ben Sharpsteen	—N/a	Released with Old Yeller. Nominated for the Academy Award for Best Live Action Short.
People & Places	Wales	June 10, 1958	Geoffrey Foot	—N/a	
People & Places	Scotland	June 11, 1958	Geoffrey Foot	—N/a	
People & Places	Ama Girls	July 9, 1958	Ben Sharpsteen	—N/a	Won the Academy Award for Best Short Subject Documentary. Released with The Light in the Forest. Later released on 16mm as Japan Harvests the Sea.
Wildlife Documentary	Grand Canyon	December 17, 1958	James Algar	Sleeping Beauty Special Edition (2003), Platinum Edition (2008)	Released with Sleeping Beauty. Won the Academy Award for Best Live Action Short
People & Places	Seven Cities of Antarctica	December 25, 1958	Winston Hibler	—N/a	Released with Tonka
Nature Documentary	Nature's Strangest Creatures	March 19, 1959	Ben Sharpsteen	Walt Disney Legacy Collection - True Life Adventures, volume 2: Lands of Exploration	Released with The Shaggy Dog
People & Places	Cruise of the Eagle	March 19, 1959	Ben Sharpsteen	—N/a	Released with The Shaggy Dog
Tomorrow Land	Eyes in Outer Space	June 18, 1959	Ward Kimball	Walt Disney Treasures: Tomorrow Land	
Nature Documentary	Mysteries of the Deep	December 16, 1959	Ben Sharpsteen	Walt Disney Legacy Collection - True Life Adventures, volume 1: Wonders of the World	Released with The Vanishing Prairie. Nominated for the Academy Award for Best Live Action Short

==== 1960s ====
Series	Title	Date	Director	DVD Release	Notes
Travelogue	Gala Day at Disneyland	January 21, 1960	Hamilton Luske	—N/a	Released with Toby Tyler
Nature Documentary	Islands of the Sea	March 16, 1960	Ben Sharpsteen	Walt Disney Legacy Collection - True Life Adventures, volume 2: Lands of Exploration	Nominated for the Academy Award for Best Live Action Short
People & Places	Japan	April 6, 1960	Ben Sharpsteen	—N/a	
People & Places	The Danube	April 27, 1960	Ben Sharpsteen	—N/a	Final film in the People & Places series
Wildlife Adventure	The Hound That Thought He Was a Raccoon	August 10, 1960	Tom McGowan	—N/a	Released with Jungle Cat
Sports Documentary	The Horse with the Flying Tail	December 21, 1960	Larry Lansburgh	Disney Movie Club	Released with both Swiss Family Robinson and One Hundred and One Dalmatians. Won the Academy Award for Best Documentary Feature
Wildlife Adventure	Yellowstone Cubs	June 13, 1963	Charles L. Draper	Disney Movie Club	Released with both Savage Sam and Summer Magic
Wildlife Adventure	A Country Coyote Goes Hollywood	January 28, 1965	Jack Couffer	Disney Movie Club	Released with Those Calloways
Wildlife Adventure	The Legend of the Boy and the Eagle	June 21, 1967	Jack Couffer	—N/a	Released with The Gnome-Mobile

==== 1970s ====
Series	Title	Date	Director	DVD Release	Notes
Travelogue	The Magic of Walt Disney World	December 22, 1972	Tom Leetch	—N/a	Released with Snowball Express.
Wildlife Adventure	A Tale of Two Critters	June 22, 1977	Jack Speirs	—N/a	Released with The Rescuers
Wildlife Adventure	Footloose Fox	July 7, 1979	Jack Speirs	—N/a	Released with a One Hundred and One Dalmatians re-release

== Non-theatrical ==
=== Coordinator of Inter-American Affairs films ===
Series	Title	Date	Director	DVD Release	Notes
Documentary	South of the Border with Disney	November 23, 1942	Norm Ferguson	Saludos Amigos	Behind the scenes, regarding Disney's trip south of the border, also includes some drawings of Disney characters, and some animated pencil test sequences. Distributed on 16mm by the Office of the Coordinator of Inter-American Affairs
Documentary	The Amazon Awakens	May 29, 1944	Bill Roberts	—N/a	Animated inserts (maps) demonstrating location vitiated. Travelogue film. Distributed on 16mm by the Office of the Coordinator of Inter-American Affairs

=== Theme park films ===
Series	Short film	Date	Director	Notes
Theme Parks	Rocket to the Moon	July 17, 1955		The Tomorrowland attraction
Theme Parks	Disneyland USA at Radio City Music Hall	1962		Mickey Mouse costumed (not animated) interacts with Walt Disney
Theme Parks	Golden Opportunity	1964		
Theme Parks	EPCOT	1967		
Theme Parks	Flight to the Moon	1967		
Theme Parks	Walt Disney World – Phase I	April 30, 1969		
Theme Parks	Walt Disney World – Vacation Kingdom	September 1969		
Theme Parks	The Magic of Disneyland	June 11, 1969		
Theme Parks	Project Florida	1971		
Theme Parks	The Hall of Presidents Film	October 1, 1971		
Theme Parks	The Walt Disney Story	April 8, 1973		
Theme Parks	EPCOT 77	1977		Promotional film for Epcot
Theme Parks	Kingdom of Dreams and Magic – Tokyo Disneyland	September 1980		Promotional film
Theme Parks	A Dream Called Walt Disney World	June 1, 1981		Promotional film
Theme Parks	The Dream Called EPCOT	June 1, 1981		Promotional film
Theme Parks	Bird and the Robot	1982		Animatronic robot explains the car production assembly line.
Theme Parks	A Day at Disneyland	June 1982		Mickey Mouse costumed (not animated) and various other Disney characters costumed (Not animated) enjoy a day at the Disneyland theme Park
Theme Parks	Magic Journeys	September 1982		3-d film
Theme Parks	Symbiosis	October 1, 1982		Epcot attraction
Theme Parks	Impressions de France	October 1, 1982		220° film
Theme Parks	TravelPort Film	October 1, 1982		Epcot attraction
Theme Parks	Energy, You Make the World Go ‘Round	October 1, 1982		Epcot attraction
Theme Parks	The Eternal Sea	April 15, 1983		200 degree film,
Theme Parks	A Visit to EPCOT Center	September 1983		Epcot attraction
Theme Parks	EPCOT Center: A Souvenir Program	January 1984		Souvenir home video
Theme Parks	Follow Us…to Walt Disney World	July 11, 1985		Promotional film.
Theme Parks	Captain EO	September 12, 1986		Live-action film featuring Michael Jackson
Theme Parks	Star Tours	January 9, 1987		Ride film, Star Wars themed.
Theme Parks	The Lottery	May 1, 1989		Minimal special effects explanation
Theme Parks	Michael and Mickey	May 1, 1989		Michael Eisner and Mickey Mouse costumed (not animated), intro Epcot attractions trailers.
Theme Parks	Body Wars	October 19, 1989		Guests are shrunken to the size of a blood cell and taken through the blood stream. Directed by Leonard Nimoy and starring Tim Matheson and Dakin Matthews.
Theme Parks	The Making of Me	October 30, 1989		Explores the topic of human conception and birth. Hosted by Martin Short. Includes an animated segment where the egg fertilizes the sperm.
Theme Parks	The Bones and Muscles Get Rhythm	January 26, 1990		Epcot film about the human body
Theme Parks	The Brain and the Nervous System Think Science	January 26, 1990		Epcot film about the human body
Theme Parks	The Heart and Lungs Play Ball	January 26, 1990		Epcot film about the human body
Theme Parks	Euro Disney: When the Dream Becomes Reality	December 5, 1990		Promotional film for Euro Disney.
Theme Parks	A Day at the Magic Kingdom	1991		Promotional film for Magic Kingdom.
Theme Parks	Mickey's Audition	1991		Mickey Mouse costumed (not animated) applies for a job at Disney.
Theme Parks	Sci-Fi Dine-In Theater Restaurant Film	April 20, 1991		Promotional film
Theme Parks	Muppet*Vision 3D	May 16, 1991		Co-produced with Jim Henson Productions, producer of the Muppets.
Theme Parks	Honey, I Shrunk the Audience	November 21, 1994		3D film spin off of the Honey, I Shrunk the Kids film series
Theme Parks	Walt Disney World at Home: Garden Magic: Telling the Story with Plants	1996		Gardening information
Theme Parks	Walt Disney World at Home: Garden Magic: Porible Gardens	1996		Gardening information
Theme Parks	Walt Disney World at Home: Garden Magic: Parterre Gardens	1996		Gardening information
Theme Parks	Walt Disney World at Home: Garden Magic: Topiary	1996		Gardening information
Theme Parks	Walt Disney World at Home: Garden Magic: Environmental Gardening	1996		Gardening information
Theme Parks	Ellen's Energy Adventure	September 15, 1996		Ellen DeGeneres stars in a film and Audio-Animatronics show about energy
Theme Parks	One Man's Dream: 100 Years of Magic	2001		
Theme Parks	The Boudin Bakery Tour	February 8, 2001		
Theme Parks	Seasons of the Vine	February 8, 2001		
Theme Parks	Golden Dreams	February 8, 2001		
Theme Parks	Soarin' Over California	February 8, 2001		
Theme Parks	Encore	September 4, 2001		
Theme Parks	StormRider	September 4, 2001		
Theme Parks	CinéMagique	March 16, 2002		
Theme Parks	Mission: Space [Mars Mission]	August 15, 2003		
Theme Parks	Where Magic Lives - Magic Kingdom	2004		
Theme Parks	Disneyland Resort: Happiest Homecoming On Earth	May 5, 2005		
Theme Parks	Disneyland: The First 50 Magical Years	May 5, 2005		
Theme Parks	Magic Kingdom: The Happiest Celebration on Earth	May 5, 2005		
Theme Parks	Welcome: Portraits of America	October 2007		
Theme Parks	Walt Disney Imagineering Blue Sky Cellar	October 20, 2008		
Theme Parks	Star Tours – The Adventures Continue	May 20, 2011		
Theme Parks	Star Wars: Path of the Jedi	November 16, 2015		
Theme Parks	Star Wars Launch Bay	November 16, 2015		
Theme Parks	Soaring Over the Horizon	June 16, 2016		
Theme Parks	Soarin' Around the World [Epcot Version]	June 16, 2016		
Theme Parks	Soarin' Around the World [Disney California Adventure Version]	June 16, 2016		
Theme Parks	Iron Man Experience	December 16, 2016		
Theme Parks	Nemo & Friends SeaRider	May 12, 2017		
Theme Parks	Avatar Flight of Passage	May 26, 2017		
Theme Parks	Mission: Space [Earth Mission]	August 13, 2017		
Theme Parks	Star Wars: Millennium Falcon – Smugglers Run	May 31, 2019		
Theme Parks	Soaring: Fantastic Flight	July 23, 2019		
Theme Parks	Awesome Planet	January 17, 2020		

=== Educational films ===
The following films were produced by Disney Educational to be shown in schools.

==== 1960s ====
Series	Short film	Date	Director	Notes
Educational	The Ceramic Mural	September 1965		

==== 1970s ====
Series	Short film	Date	Notes
Educational	The Magic Whistle	1972	
Educational	Mrs. Peabody's Beach	1972	
History Alive!	Democracy – Equality or Privilege	1972	
History Alive!	The Right of Dissent	1972	
History Alive!	States' Rights	1972	
History Alive!	The Right of Petition	1972	
History Alive!	Impeachment of a President	1972	
Educational	Leonardo da Vinci – First Man of the Renaissance	1972	
Educational	John Muir – Father of Our National Parks	1973	About national parks not theme parks.
Educational	Henry O. Tanner – Pioneer Black American Artist	September 1973	
Educational	Sequoyah	September 1974	
Educational	Barbara Inside Out	1975	
Educational	3 Days in the County Jail	1975	Distribution only
Fergi Builds a Business	If the Fergi Fits, Wear It	September 1975	
Educational	The Reunion	September 1976	
Fergi Builds a Business	Fergi Goes Inc.	September 1977	
Fergi Builds a Business	Fergi Diversifies	September 1977	
The People on Market Street	Wages and Production	September 1977	
The People on Market Street	Scarcity and Planning	September 1977	
The People on Market Street	Market Clearing Price	September 1977	
The People on Market Street	Demand	September 1977	
The People on Market Street	Cost	September 1977	
The People on Market Street	Supply	September 1977	
The People on Market Street	Property Rights and Pollution	September 1977	
Fergi Builds a Business	Fergi Meets the Challenge	September 1978	
Eyewitness to History	The Events	September 1978	
Eyewitness to History	The Life Styles	September 1978	
Eyewitness to History	The People	September 1978	
The National Student Test	The National Student Fire Safety Test	September 1979	
The National Student Test	The National Student Recreational Safety Test	September 1979	
The National Student Test	The National Student School Safety Test	September 1979	
The National Student Test	The National Student Traffic Safety Test	September 1979	
The National Student Test	The National Student First Aid Test	September 1979	
The Truly Exceptional	Carol Johnston	September 1979	
The Truly Exceptional	Dan Haley	September 1979	
The Truly Exceptional	Tom and Virl Osmond	September 1979	

==== 1980s ====
Series	Short film	Date	Notes
Educational	Rick, You're In: A Story About Mainstreaming	September 1980	
Fit to Be You	Flexibility and Body Composition	September 1980	
Fit to Be You	Muscles	September 1980	
Fit to Be You	Heart-Lungs	September 1980	
The Nick Price Story of Non-Manipulative Selling	A Better Way to Go: An Introduction to Non-Manipulative Selling	February 1981	
The Nick Price Story of Non-Manipulative Selling	The Danbury Secret of Flexible Behavior	February 1981	
The Nick Price Story of Non-Manipulative Selling	The Voice: Questions that Help You Sell	February 1981	
Educational	Comets: Time Capsules of the Solar System	September 1981	Uses live-action and animated diagrams.
Educational	Reaching Out: A Story About Mainstreaming	September 1981	
Educational	The Cookie Kid	September 1981	
Fitness for Living	What Is Physical Fitness	September 1982	
Fitness for Living	How to Get Fit	September 1982	
Fitness for Living	Measuring Up	September 1982	
Educational	Speaking of Weather	September 1982	Part animated
Educational	Close-up on the Planets	September 1982	
Educational	America Works…America Sings	September 1982	
Fun to Be Fit	Why Be Physically Fit?	March 1983	
Fun to Be Fit	Getting Physically Fit	March 1983	
Fun to Be Fit	Physical Fitness	March 1983	
Educational	The Time Traveler's Guide to Energy	September 1983	
Educational	Future Work	September 1983	
Educational	Decision-Making: Critical Thought in Action	September 1983	
Skills for the New Technology	What a Kid Needs to Know Today: Basic Communication Skills	September 1983	
Skills for the New Technology	What a Kid Needs to Know Today: Living with Change	September 1983	
Skills for the New Technology	What a Kid Needs to Know Today: Living with Computers	September 1983	
Educational	Computers: The Truth of the Matter	October 1, 1983	
Educational	Lights! Camera! Fractions!	March 1984	Includes some minimal stop-motion special effects.
Educational	Ethics in the Computer Age	August 1984	
Educational	Energy in Physics	August 1984	
Educational	Child Molestation: Breaking the Silence	August 1984	
Educational	Now I Can Tell You My Secret	August 1984	
The Challenge of Survival	The Challenge of Survival: Land	August 1984	Minimal use of animated diagrams
The Challenge of Survival	The Challenge of Survival: Chemical	August 1984	Minimal use of animated diagrams.
The Challenge of Survival	The Challenge of Survival: Water	August 1984	Minimal use of animated diarams
Educational	Flight	September 1985	
Educational	Decimals: What's the Point	September 1985	Produced for Walt Disney Educational Media Company by Winterfilm. Minimal animated inserts showing numbers.
Educational	Economics by Choice	September 1985	
Educational	On Your Own	September 1985	
Educational	Before It's Too Late: A Film on Teenage Suicide	September 1985	
Educational	A Time to Tell: Teen Sexual Abuse	September 1985	
Educational	Expectations: A Story About Stress	September 1985	
Educational	Simple Machines: A Moving Experience	March 1986	
Educational	Storms	March 1986	Interviews, animated diagrams, and some reused animated footage.
Educational	AIDS	September 1986	
Educational	Earthquakes	September 1986	
Educational	Smokeless Tobacco	September 1986	
Educational	Chemistry Matters	September 1986	
Educational	Learning with Film and Video	September 1986	
Educational	Using Simple Machines	September 1986	
Educational	Careers in Math & Science: A Different View	September 1986	
Educational	Crack: The Big Lie	February 1987	
Educational	AIDS: What Do We Tell Our Children?	August 1987	
Educational	The Children of Japan: Learning the New, Remembering the Old	September 1987	
Educational	Goofy's Hygiene Game	August 1987	Goofy costumed (not animated) explains with clips from his classic cartoons the importance of good hygiene.
Educational	Mickey's Field Trips: The Police Station	September 1987	Costumed Mickey Mouse (not animated) offers kids a field trip to important social institutions.
Educational	Mickey's Field Trips: The Fire Station	September 1987	Costumed Mickey Mouse (not animated) offers kids a field trip to important social institutions.
Educational	Mickey's Field Trips: The Hospital	September 1987	Costumed Mickey Mouse (not animated) offers kids a field trip to important social institutions.
Educational	Electricity	September 1987	
Educational	Benny and the 'Roids: A Story About Steroid Abuse	March 1988	
Educational	Blackberries in the Dark	March 1988	
Educational	Norway – the Film	July 5, 1988	
Educational	Choices: A Story About Staying in School	August 1988	
Educational	School Hero: A Story About Staying in School	August 1988	
Educational	Children of the Soviet Union	September 1988	
Educational	The Jamie Fort Story: A Story About Self-Esteem	September 1988	
Educational	Safety Belt Expert	September 1988	Feature Costumed Mickey Mouse (not animated)
Educational	Minnie's Science Field Trips: San Diego Zoo	September 1988	Costumed Minnie Mouse (not animated) offers kids a field trip to important social institutions.
Educational	Minnie's Science Field Trips: Johnson Space Center	September 1988	Costumed Minnie Mouse (not animated) offers kids a field trip to important social institutions.
Educational	Minnie's Science Field Trips: The Living Seas	September 1988	Costumed Minnie Mouse (not animated) offers kids a field trip to important social institutions.
Educational	Do Dragons Dream?	September 1988	Figment shows children imagination's involvement in developing ideas.
Educational	How Does It Feel to Be an Elephant?	September 1988	Figment teaches about various comprehension skills through an imaginary safari.
Educational	How Does Sound Sound?	September 1988	Figment demonstrates rhythm in sound and how the five senses can be used to observe the world.
Educational	What Can You See By Looking?	September 1988	Figment teaches observation skills through wordplay.
Educational	How Does It Feel to Fly?	September 1988	Describing the world through classifying and sequencing..
Educational	Would You Eat A Blue Potato?	September 1988	Figment shows the different impressions given by different colors.
Educational	D.A.R.E. to Say "No"	September 1988	
Educational	Computers: Where They Come From and How They Work	April 1989	
Educational	The Children of Mexico	April 20, 1989	
Educational	Like Jake and Me	May 9, 1989	
Educational	The Writing Process: A Conversation with Mavis Jukes	July 3, 1989	
Educational	Mickey's Field Trips: The United Nations	July 27, 1989	Costumed Goofy (not animated) offer kid a field trip to important social institutions.
Educational	Goofy's Field Trips: Ships	August 7, 1989	Costumed Goofy (not animated) offers kids a field trip to important social institutions.
Educational	Goofy's Field Trips: Trains	August 10, 1989	Costumed Goofy (not animated) offers kids a field trip to important social institutions.
Educational	Goofy's Field Trips: Planes	August 18, 1989	Costumed Goofy (not animated) offers kids a field trip to important social institutions.
Educational	The Constitution: A History of Our Future	September 1989	Mostly live-action conversation, but also an animated segment.
Educational	Mickey's Safety Club: Halloween Surprises	September 1989	Costumed Mickey Mouse (not animated) offers kids a field trip to important social institutions.
Educational	Mickey's Safety Club: Playground Fun	September 1989	Costumed Mickey Mouse (not animated) offers kids a field trip to important social institutions.
Educational	Mickey's Safety Club: What to Do at Home	September 1989	Costumed Mickey Mouse (not animated) offers kids a field trip to important social institutions.
Educational	Mickey's Safety Club: Street Safe, Street Smart	September 1989	Costumed Mickey Mouse (not animated) offers kids a field trip to important social institutions.
Educational	Where Does Time Fly?	September 1989	Animated character Figment teaches words used for past, present, and future tenses.
Educational	What's an Abra Without a Cadabra?	September 1989	Figment teaches antonyms, homonyms, synonyms, and rhymes.
Educational	The Case of the Missing Space	October 1989	Viewers solve a mystery through deciphering a scrambled message.
Educational	Reading Magic with Figment and Peter Pan	1989	Figment and Wendy show Peter Pan the fun of reading.
Educational	A Gift of Time: Pediatric AIDS	September 1989	
Educational	Teenage Substance Abuse: An Open Forum with John Callahan	November 1989	

==== 1990s ====
Series	Short film	Date	Notes
Educational	Goofy's Office Safety Championship	1990	Costumed Goofy (not animated) offers kids a field trip to important social institutions.
Educational	Goofy's Plant Safety Championship	1990	Costumed Goofy (not animated) offers kids a field trip to important social institutions.
Educational	Rachel and Marla	July 5, 1990	
Educational	Who Owns the Sun?	August 14, 1990	
Educational	The Great Quake Hazard Hunt	October 18, 1990	Rescue Rangers Chip and Dale (costumed, not animated) explain what to do in the event of an earthquake.
Educational	Voices of the Road Back: A Program About Drugs	October 1990	
Educational	If I'm Lyin'…I'm Dyin': A Program About Smoking	November 1990	
Educational	Zort Sorts: A Story about Recycling	1991	
Educational	Goofy over Dental Health	March, 1991	Goofy costumed (not animated) explains the importance of tooth brushing to an 8 year old. Produced by Disney Educational and shown in school.
Educational	Goofy over Health	March, 1991	Goofy costumed (not animated) explains to 8 year old the proper importance of proper health habits. produced by Walt Disney Educational and shown in School.
Educational	Climbing High	January 1991	
Educational	Donald's Fire Drill	January 1991	Costumed Donald Duck (not animated), is the host at a quiz-show themed around fire safety, produced by Disney Educational and shown in school
Educational	Fitness Fun with Goofy	March, 1991	Goofy costumed (not animated) has a fitness program for kids. Produced by Disney Educational and shown in school.
Educational	Return to Sender	March 1991	
Educational	Paying the Price	March 1991	
Educational	D.A.R.E. to Care: A Program for Parents	April 1991	
Educational	It's Not My Fault	August 1991	
Educational	Rescue Rangers Fire Safety Adventure	August 1991	Chip'n Dale Rescue Rangers (Costumed, not animated) need to foil a plot by the Fatcat (not animated)
Educational	Drawing Conclusions	August 1991	A Philosophical program
Educational	What's Wrong With This Picture?	August 1991	
Educational	Big Brother Blues	1991	
Educational	Loaded Weapon	February 1992	
Educational	AIDS: You've Got to Do Something	June 1992	
Educational	No Big Deal	June 1992	
Educational	D.A.R.E. to Be Aware: Matt's Story	November 1992	
Educational	D.A.R.E. to Be Aware: Michael's Story	November 1992	
Educational	Out of Control	November 1992	
Educational	Consider the Alternatives	December 1992	
Educational	D.A.R.E. to Be Aware: Angela's Story	1992	
Educational	Skin Deep	October 4, 1993	
Educational	D.A.R.E. to Be Aware: Steve's Story	December 1993	
Educational	D.A.R.E. to Be Aware: Lauren's Story	December 1993	
Educational	Discover Quest: Explorations in Earth Science	December 1994	
Educational	Discover Quest: Explorations in Life Science	December 1994	
Educational	Discover Quest: Explorations in Physical Science	December 1994	
Educational	Smoke Signals	January 1995	
Educational	Still Waters	January 1995	
Educational	Under the Gun	January 1995	
Educational	Waging Peace	November 6, 1996	Originally shown on Disney channel

==== 2000s ====
Series	Short film	Date	Notes
Educational	Randy Pausch: The Last Lecture	November 25, 2008	Classroom Edition

=== Music Videos ===
Series	Short film	Date	Director	Notes
Music video	The Party Tilyadrop Tour	April 19, 1991		Music video from the Tilyadrop Tour band and some back stage showings.

=== Online films ===
Series	Short film	Date	Notes
Theme Parks	The Art of Vacationing	April 5, 2012	First screened online
Theme Parks	The Art of Keeping Cool	June 30, 2015	First screened online
Theme Parks	The Art of Fishing	June 21, 2016	First screened online
Launchpad	American Eid	May 28, 2021	
Launchpad	Dinner Is Served	May 28, 2021	
Launchpad	Growing Fangs	May 28, 2021	
Launchpad	The Last of the Chupacabras	May 28, 2021	
Launchpad	Let's Be Tigers	May 28, 2021	
Launchpad	The Little Prince(ss)	May 28, 2021	
n/a	Say It With PRIDE: Disney+ Celebrate Pride 365 Variety Show	June 30, 2022	YouTube & Facebook
Launchpad	Beautiful, FL	September 29, 2023	
Launchpad	Black Belts	September 23, 2023	
Launchpad	The Ghost	September 23, 2023	
Launchpad	Maxine	September 23, 2023	
Launchpad	Project CC	September 23, 2023	
Launchpad	The Roof	September 23, 2023	
n/a	A Disney Holiday Short: The Invisible Horse	November 9, 2026	

== See also ==
- True-Life Adventures
- People & Places
- Circle-Vision 360°
- Welcome to Pooh Corner
- Questions! / Answers?
- Bill Nye the Science Guy
- Disney Channel
- List of Disney animated shorts
- List of Disney theatrical animated feature films
- List of Disney feature films
- List of Disney home entertainment
- List of Disney television series
- Disney anthology television series (1954–1983)
