= List of animated short films of the 1980s =

Films are sorted by year and then alphabetically. They include theatrical, television, and direct-to-video films with less than 40 minutes runtime. For a list of films with over 40 minutes of runtime, see List of animated feature films of the 1980s.

== 1980 ==
| Name | Country | Technique |
|---|---|---|
| All Nothing | Canada | Traditional Animation |
| At the Bus Stop | Japan | Traditional Animation |
| The Berenstain Bears Meet Bigpaw | United States | Traditional Animation |
| The Bugs Bunny Mystery Special | United States | Traditional Animation |
| Bugs Bunny's Bustin' Out All Over | United States | Traditional Animation |
| Carlton Your Doorman | United States | Traditional Animation |
| The Christmas Raccoons | Canada | Traditional Animation |
| Daffy Duck's Easter Show | United States | Traditional Animation |
| Daffy Duck's Thanks-for-Giving Special | United States | Traditional Animation |
| Daffy Flies North | United States | Traditional Animation |
| Dinosaur (aka Dinosaurs!) | United States | Stop-motion Animation |
| Duck Dodgers and the Return of the 24 1/2th Century | United States | Traditional Animation |
| Easter Fever | Canada | Traditional Animation |
| The Fall of the House of Usher | Czechoslovakia | Live-action/stop-motion |
| Fisheye | Croatia | Traditional Animation |
| The Flintstones: Fred's Final Fling | United States | Traditional Animation |
| The Flintstones' New Neighbors | United States | Traditional Animation |
| The Fly | Hungary | Traditional Animation |
| Foods and Fun: A Nutrition Adventure | United States | Traditional Animation |
| Hana no Ko Runrun: Konnichiwa Sakura no Kuni | Japan | Traditional Animation |
| History of the World in Three Minutes Flat | Canada | Traditional Animation |
| Last of the Red-Hot Dragons | United States | Traditional Animation |
| Life Is a Circus, Charlie Brown | United States | Traditional Animation |
| Mahō Shōjo Raraberu: Umi ga Yobu Natsuyatsumi | Japan | Traditional Animation |
| Mickey Mouse Disco | United States | Traditional Animation |
| Moon Breath Beat | United States | Traditional Animation |
| The Pink Panther in: Olym-Pinks | United States | Traditional Animation |
| Pontoffel Pock, Where Are You? | United States | Traditional Animation |
| Portrait of the Artist as a Young Bunny | United States | Traditional Animation |
| The Puppy's Amazing Rescue | United States | Traditional Animation |
| Seaside Woman | United Kingdom | Traditional Animation |
| She's a Good Skate, Charlie Brown | United States | Traditional Animation |
| Sing Beast Sing | Canada | Traditional Animation |
| The Sorcerer's Apprentice | Canada | Traditional Animation |
| Soup or Sonic | United States | Traditional Animation |
| Spaced Out Bunny | United States | Traditional Animation |
| Suur Tõll | Estonia | Cutout Animation |
| Take Me Up to the Ball Game | Canada | Traditional Animation |
| Teeny-Tiny and the Witch-Woman | United States | Traditional Animation |
| Thanksgiving in the Land of Oz | United States | Traditional Animation |
| The Three Inventors | French | Stop-motion Animation |
| Tough Tire! SHADO Tire | Japan | Traditional Animation |
| Who Will Comfort Toffle? | Sweden | Traditional Animation |
| Wild Times in the Wildwood | United States | Traditional Animation |
| The World of Strawberry Shortcake | United States | Traditional Animation |
| The Yolk's on You | United States | Traditional Animation |

== 1981 ==
| Name | Country | Technique |
|---|---|---|
| Adventures of Vasia Kurolesov | Soviet Union | Traditional Animation |
| Akuma to Himegimi | Japan | Traditional Animation |
| B.C.: A Special Christmas | United States | Traditional Animation |
| Beauty and the Beast | United States | Traditional Animation |
| The Berenstain Bears' Easter Surprise | United States | Traditional Animation |
| Bugs Bunny: All American Hero | United States | Traditional Animation |
| Carla's Island | United States | Computer Animation |
| A Chipmunk Christmas | United States | Traditional Animation |
| Crac | Canada | Traditional Animation |
| The Creation | United States | Traditional Animation |
| Daicon III Opening Animation | Japan | Traditional Animation |
| A Deer of Nine Colors | China | Traditional Animation |
| Dennis the Menace in Mayday for Mother | United States | Traditional Animation |
| Dog in Boots | Soviet Union | Traditional Animation |
| Doraemon: What Am I for Momotaro | Japan | Traditional Animation |
| Dr. Slump and Arale-chan: Hello! Wonder Island | Japan | Traditional Animation |
| 'E' | Canada | Stop-motion Animation |
| Erection | Italy | Traditional Animation |
| Five Billion Years | Japan | Traditional Animation |
| The Flintstones: Jogging Fever | United States | Traditional Animation |
| The Flintstones: Wind-Up Wilma | United States | Traditional Animation |
| The Golden Chicken | Soviet Union | Traditional Animation |
| Hedgehog Plus Turtle | Soviet Union | Traditional Animation |
| It's Magic, Charlie Brown | United States | Traditional Animation |
| Ivashka from Pioneers Palace | Soviet Union | Traditional Animation |
| Kot Kotofeevich | Soviet Union | Traditional Animation |
| Moon Man | United States | Traditional Animation |
| Mother for a Little Mammoth | Soviet Union | Traditional Animation |
| No Man's Valley | United States | Traditional Animation |
| Once Cowboy, Twice Cowboy | Soviet Union | Traditional Animation |
| Once Upon a Mouse | United States | Traditional Animation |
| The Pied Piper of Hamelin | United Kingdom | Stop-motion Animation |
| Pigbird | United States | Traditional Animation |
| The Pink Panther in: Pink at First Sight | United States | Traditional Animation |
| The Puppy Saves the Circus | United States | Traditional Animation |
| The Raccoons on Ice | Canada | Traditional Animation |
| Seepage | United States | Stop-motion Animation |
| Skyscraper | Yugoslavia | Traditional Animation |
| Someday You'll Find Her, Charlie Brown | United States | Traditional Animation |
| Strawberry Shortcake in Big Apple City | United States | Traditional Animation |
| Tango | Poland | Stop-motion Animation |
| Ted Bakes One | United States | Traditional Animation |
| The Tender Tale of Cinderella Penguin | Canada | Traditional Animation |
| The Trip | United States | Traditional Animation |
| The Trolls and the Christmas Express | Canada | Traditional Animation |
| Winnie the Pooh Discovers the Seasons | United States | Traditional Animation |

== 1982 ==
| Name | Country | Technique |
|---|---|---|
| Asari-chan Ai no Marchen Shōjo | Japan | Traditional Animation |
| The Berenstain Bears' Comic Valentine | United States | Traditional Animation |
| Bugs Bunny's Mad World of Television | United States | Traditional Animation |
| Bunnicula, the Vampire Rabbit | United States | Traditional Animation |
| Christmas Comes to Pac-Land | United States | Traditional Animation |
| Curious George Goes to the Hospital | United States | Stop-motion Animation |
| The Deer's Bell | China | Traditional Animation |
| Dimensions of Dialogue | Czechoslovakia | Stop-motion Animation |
| Enter Life | United States | Traditional Animation |
| A Family Circus Easter | United States | Traditional Animation |
| Fun with Mr. Future | United States | Traditional Animation |
| The Great Cognito | United States | Stop-motion Animation |
| The Grinch Grinches the Cat in the Hat | United States | Traditional Animation |
| The Hat | United States | Traditional Animation |
| Here Comes Garfield | United States | Traditional Animation |
| Malice in Wonderland | United States | Traditional Animation |
| New Year's Song of Father Frost | Soviet Union | Traditional Animation |
| Ninja Hattori-kun: Nin Nin Ninpo Enikki no Maki | Japan | Traditional Animation |
| Oh What a Knight | Canada | Traditional Animation |
| Once Upon a Dog | Soviet Union | Traditional Animation |
| Puff and the Incredible Mr. Nobody | United States | Traditional Animation |
| The Snowman | United Kingdom | Traditional Animation |
| A Star for Jeremy | United States | Traditional Animation |
| The Strange Case of Mr. Donnybrook's Boredom | United States | Traditional Animation |
| Strawberry Shortcake: Pets on Parade | United States | Traditional Animation |
| The Three Knights | United Kingdom | Traditional Animation |
| Tobiuo no Bōya wa Byōki Desu | Japan | Traditional Animation |
| Vincent | United States | Stop-motion Animation |
| Yogi Bear's All Star Comedy Christmas Caper | United States | Traditional Animation |
| Ziggy's Gift | United States | Traditional Animation |

== 1983 ==
| Name | Country | Technique |
|---|---|---|
| The Awful Fate of Melpomenus Jones | Canada | Traditional Animation |
| Azicon Opening Animation | Japan | Traditional Animation |
| The Berenstain Bears Play Ball | United States | Traditional Animation |
| The Boy and the Blue Sea | Japan | Traditional Animation |
| The Care Bears in the Land Without Feelings | Canada | Traditional Animation |
| 'Cat and Mouse' at the Home | United States | Traditional Animation |
| The Charmkins | United States | Traditional Animation |
| Choro-Q Dougram | Japan | Traditional Animation |
| The Christmas Tree Train | United States | Traditional Animation |
| The Coneheads | United States | Traditional Animation |
| Czarny kapturek | Poland | Theatrical |
| Daicon IV Opening Animation | Japan | Traditional Animation |
| Deck the Halls with Wacky Walls | United States | Traditional Animation |
| Down to the Cellar | Czechoslovakia | Live-action/stop-motion |
| Early Bird | United Kingdom | Stop-motion Animation |
| Gebocon I Opening Animation | Japan | Traditional Animation |
| Garfield on the Town | United States | Traditional Animation |
| The Green Cat | Japan | Traditional Animation |
| The Great Bear Scare | United States | Traditional Animation |
| Happy Hour | United States | Traditional Animation |
| Is This Goodbye, Charlie Brown? | United States | Traditional Animation |
| Jeremy no Ki | Japan | Traditional Animation |
| Late Edition | United Kingdom | Stop-motion Animation |
| The Magic of Herself the Elf | United States | Traditional Animation |
| Mickey's Christmas Carol | United States | Traditional Animation |
| On Probation | United Kingdom | Stop-motion Animation |
| Only a Kiss | Italy | Traditional Animation |
| Palmy Days | United Kingdom | Stop-motion Animation |
| The Pendulum, the Pit and Hope | Czechoslovakia | Live-action/stop-motion |
| Peter and the Magic Egg | United States | Traditional Animation |
| Perman: Birdman ga Yatte Kita!! | Japan | Traditional Animation |
| Põrgu | Estonia | Theatrical |
| Sales Pitch | United Kingdom | Stop-motion Animation |
| Skywhales | United Kingdom | Traditional Animation |
| Sound of Sunshine — Sound of Rain | United States | Traditional Animation |
| Strawberry Shortcake: Housewarming Surprise | United States | Traditional Animation |
| Sundae in New York | United States | Stop-motion Animation |
| Teddy Bear Maelstrom | United States | Computer Animation |
| The Secret Adventures of Og | United States | Traditional Animation |
| Uracon II Opening Animation | Japan | Traditional Animation |
| What Have We Learned, Charlie Brown? | United States | Traditional Animation |
| Winnie the Pooh and a Day for Eeyore | United States | Traditional Animation |
| Wow! A Talking Fish! | Soviet Union | Traditional Animation |

== 1984 ==
| Name | Country | Technique |
|---|---|---|
| The Adventures of André and Wally B. | United States | Computer Animation |
| Anijam | Canada | Traditional Animation |
| Anna & Bella | Netherlands | Traditional Animation |
| Bad Cat | United States | Traditional Animation |
| The Cabbage Patch Kids' First Christmas | United States | Traditional Animation |
| The Cabinet of Jan Svankmajer | United Kingdom | Stop-motion Animation |
| The Care Bears Battle the Freeze Machine | Canada | Traditional Animation |
| The Cat in the Cap | Soviet Union | Traditional Animation |
| Charade | Canada | Traditional Animation |
| Chromosaurus | United States | Computer Animation |
| Curious George | United States | Stop-motion Animation |
| Destination: Careers | United States | Traditional Animation |
| Destination: Communications | United States | Traditional Animation |
| Destination: Excellence | United States | Traditional Animation |
| Destination: Science | United States | Traditional Animation |
| Doctor De Soto | United States | Traditional Animation |
| Don't Answer Me | United States | Stop-motion/traditional |
| Earthquake Preparedness | United States | Traditional Animation |
| Elephant Bubbles | United States | Computer Animation |
| The Fight Between the Snipe and the Clam | China | Traditional Animation |
| Fitness and Me: How to Exercise? | United States | Traditional Animation |
| Fitness and Me: What Is Fitness Exercise? | United States | Traditional Animation |
| Fitness and Me: Why Exercise? | United States | Traditional Animation |
| Garfield in the Rough | United States | Traditional Animation |
| Hair Piece: A Film for Nappyheaded People | United States | Cutout/live-action |
| Harold and His Amazing Green Plants | United States | Traditional Animation |
| High Fidelity | United States | Computer Animation |
| Hooray for Sandbox Land | Canada | Traditional Animation |
| It's Flashbeagle, Charlie Brown | United States | Traditional Animation |
| Jumping | Japan | Traditional Animation |
| The Kabocha Wine: Nita no Aijou Monogatari | Japan | Traditional Animation |
| King of the Cats | United States | Traditional Animation |
| A Merry Mirthworm Christmas | United States | Traditional Animation |
| Moa Moa | Italy | Traditional Animation |
| My Little Pony: Rescue at Midnight Castle | United States | Traditional Animation |
| Paradise | Canada | Traditional Animation |
| Poochie | United States | Traditional Animation |
| The Raccoons: Let's Dance! | Canada | Traditional Animation |
| Robo Force: The Revenge of Nazgar | United States | Traditional Animation |
| Rose Petal Place | United States | Traditional Animation |
| Rupert and the Frog Song | United Kingdom | Traditional Animation |
| S=13 | Japan | Traditional Animation |
| The Satisfaction | Japan | Traditional Animation |
| Strawberry Shortcake and the Baby Without a Name | United States | Traditional Animation |
| Uracon III Opening Animation | Japan | Traditional Animation |
| We Think the World Is Round | United States | Traditional Animation |
| Which Witch Is Which | United States | Traditional Animation |
| Why Mosquitoes Buzz in People's Ears | United States | Traditional Animation |

== 1985 ==
| Name | Country | Technique |
|---|---|---|
| About Sidorov Vova | Soviet Union | Traditional Animation |
| Arei no Kagami | Japan | Traditional Animation |
| Baubas | Lithuania | Traditional Animation |
| The Bear and the Fly | United States | Traditional Animation |
| The Big Snit | Canada | Traditional Animation |
| The Body Electric | Canada | Traditional Animation |
| Boomtown | United States | Traditional Animation |
| Botco | United States | Computer Animation |
| Broken Down Film | Japan | Traditional Animation |
| Cap'n O. G. Readmore's Jack and the Beanstalk | United States | Traditional Animation |
| The Child of the High Seas | France | Traditional Animation |
| A Chipmunk Reunion | United States | Traditional Animation |
| The Chocolate Panic Picture Show | Japan | Traditional Animation |
| Chōnōryoku Shōjo Barabanba | Japan | Traditional Animation |
| Contract | Soviet Union | Traditional Animation |
| Cosmic Zoom | United States | Computer Animation |
| Datenshi-tachi no Kyōen | Japan | Traditional Animation |
| The Death Lullaby | Japan | Traditional Animation |
| Dr. Slump and Arale-chan: Hoyoyo! The City of Dreams, Mechapolis | Japan | Traditional Animation |
| Elephantrio | Canada | Traditional Animation |
| For Better or For Worse: The Bestest Present | Canada | Traditional Animation |
| Frog and Toad Are Friends | United States | Stop-motion Animation |
| From a Cow's Diary | Sweden | Traditional Animation |
| Garfield's Halloween Adventure | United States | Traditional Animation |
| GeGeGe no Kitarō | Japan | Traditional Animation |
| George and the Christmas Star | Canada | Traditional Animation |
| Get a Job | Canada | Traditional Animation |
| Ghot | United States | Computer Animation |
| Ginga Hyouryuu Vifam: Chicago Super Police 13 | Japan | Traditional Animation |
| The Glo Friends Save Christmas | United States | Traditional Animation |
| A Greek Tragedy | Belgium | Traditional Animation |
| How the Little Hedgehog and the Little Bear Changed the Sky | Soviet Union | Traditional Animation |
| Incubus | Italy | Traditional Animation |
| Jac Mac & Rad Boy Go! | United States | Traditional Animation |
| Kimagure Orange☆Road: Shounen Jump Special | Japan | Traditional Animation |
| Kinnikuman: Gyakushuu! Uchuu Kakure Choujin | Japan | Traditional Animation |
| Kiss Me You Fool | United States | Computer Animation |
| Kochira Katsushika-ku Kameari Kōen Mae Hashutsujo: Jump Fiesta Special | Japan | Traditional Animation |
| The Last Present | Soviet Union | Traditional Animation |
| Love in the Fast Lane | United States | Traditional Animation |
| Lunn Flies into the Wind | Japan | Traditional Animation |
| Maho no Rouge Lipstick | Japan | Traditional Animation |
| Marriage | Bulgaria | Traditional Animation |
| Max Trax | United States | Computer Animation |
| Max's Place | United States | Computer Animation |
| Me and Sherlock Holmes | Soviet Union | Traditional Animation |
| Milky Gal: Cats Ai | Japan | Traditional Animation |
| Monkeys and the Robbers | Soviet Union | Traditional Animation |
| Mr and Mrs Vinegar | Soviet Union | Traditional Animation |
| My Little Pony: Escape from Catrina | United States | Traditional Animation |
| Naoko no Tropic Angel: Hyōryū | Japan | Traditional Animation |
| Panteley i pugalo | Soviet Union | Traditional Animation |
| Peropero Candy | Japan | Traditional Animation |
| Pierre | United States | Traditional Animation |
| Planet 888 | Soviet Union | Stop-motion Animation |
| The Poky Little Puppy and the Patchwork Blanket | United States | Limited |
| The Pound Puppies | United States | Traditional Animation |
| Punky Funky Baby | Japan | Traditional Animation |
| A Pumpkin Full of Nonsense | United States | Traditional Animation |
| The Romance of Betty Boop | United States | Traditional Animation |
| Rose Petal Place: Real Friends | United States | Traditional Animation |
| Rumpelstiltskin | Canada | Traditional Animation |
| Sampo from Lapland | Soviet Union | Traditional Animation |
| Second Class Mail | United Kingdom | Traditional Animation |
| Shining May | Japan | Traditional Animation |
| Snoopy's Getting Married, Charlie Brown | United States | Traditional Animation |
| Star Fairies | United States | Traditional Animation |
| Strawberry Shortcake Meets the Berrykins | United States | Traditional Animation |
| Suashi no Houkago | Japan | Traditional Animation |
| Suspicious Circumstances | United States | Stop-motion Animation |
| Sweet Sea | United States, Japan | Traditional Animation |
| The Tale of the Wonderful Potato | Denmark | Cutout Animation |
| Telepathist AI Q315 Saiko | Japan | Traditional Animation |
| Tongari Bōshi no Memoru | Japan | Traditional Animation |
| Tony de Peltrie | United States | Computer Animation |
| Tuber's Two Step | United States | Computer Animation |
| The Turkey Caper | United States | Traditional Animation |
| The Velveteen Rabbit | Canada | Traditional Animation |
| The Wreck of the Julie Plante | United Kingdom | Traditional Animation |

== 1986 ==
| Name | Country | Technique |
|---|---|---|
| Adesugata Mahou no Sannin Musume | Japan | Traditional Animation |
| Babar and Father Christmas | Canada | Traditional Animation |
| Babylon | United Kingdom | Stop-motion Animation |
| Beach Chair | United States | Computer Animation |
| The Blue Chair | United States | Computer Animation |
| Bring Me the Head of Charlie Brown | United States | Traditional Animation |
| Call Me Tonight | Japan | Traditional Animation |
| Cap'n O. G. Readmore Meets Dr. Jekyll and Mr. Hyde | United States | Traditional Animation |
| Captain Tsubasa: Asu ni Mukatte Hashire! | Japan | Traditional Animation |
| The Characters | Netherlands | Traditional Animation |
| Christmas Every Day | United States | Cutout Animation |
| Conversations by a Californian Swimming Pool | United Kingdom | Stop-motion Animation |
| Cool Cool Bye | Japan | Traditional Animation |
| Cosmos Pink Shock | Japan | Traditional Animation |
| Death of a Speechwriter | United Kingdom | Stop-motion Animation |
| Dreamless Sleep | United Kingdom | Stop-motion Animation |
| Every Dog's Guide to Complete Home Safety | Canada | Traditional Animation |
| Fair Play | United States | Computer Animation |
| Flags and Waves | United States | Computer Animation |
| Freshwater | Japan | Experimental |
| The Frog, the Dog and the Devil | New Zealand | Traditional Animation |
| Ganbare Swimmy | Japan | Traditional Animation |
| Garfield in Paradise | United States | Traditional Animation |
| Geba Geba Shou Time! | Japan | Traditional Animation |
| GeGeGe no Kitarō: Yōkai Dai-Sensō | Japan | Traditional Animation |
| A Greek Tragedy | Belgium | Traditional Animation |
| Happy New Year, Charlie Brown! | United States | Traditional Animation |
| Harlem Shuffle | United States | Traditional/live-action |
| The Hundredth Monkey | Japan | Traditional Animation |
| Interiors | United States | Computer Animation |
| Katsugeki Shōjo Tantei Dan | Japan | Traditional Animation |
| Katte ni Shirokuma | Japan | Traditional Animation |
| Lollipop Dragon: The Great Christmas Race | United States | Traditional Animation |
| Lollipop Dragon: The Magic Lollipop Adventure | United States | Traditional Animation |
| Luxo Jr. | United States | Computer Animation |
| Madballs: Escape from Orb | United States | Traditional Animation |
| Maple Town Monogatari | Japan | Traditional Animation |
| Metafable | United States | Computer Animation |
| Mongo Makongo | United States | Traditional Animation |
| The Most Wonderful Egg in the World | United States | Traditional Animation |
| Niji no Kanata e!: Shōjo Diana-hi Monogatari | Japan | Traditional Animation |
| Obake no Q-Tarō: Tobidase! Bake Bake Daisakusen | Japan | Traditional Animation |
| Okubyo na Venus | Japan | Traditional Animation |
| Opéra Industriel | Canada, United States | Computer Animation |
| Paradise Regained | United Kingdom | Stop-motion Animation |
| Pro Golfer Saru: Super Golf World e no Chōsen!! | Japan | Traditional Animation |
| Quest: A Long Ray's Journey Into Light | United States | Computer Animation |
| Santabear's First Christmas | United States | Traditional Animation |
| Snookles | United States | Traditional Animation |
| Somewhere in the Arctic | United States | Traditional Animation |
| Speeder | United States | Computer Animation |
| Street of Crocodiles | United Kingdom | Stop-motion Animation |
| Swimmy | United States | Traditional Animation |
| The Tin Soldier | Canada | Traditional Animation |
| Transformers: Scramble City | Japan | Traditional Animation |
| Violence Jack: Harem Bomber | Japan | Traditional Animation |
| Vision Obvious | United States | Computer Animation |
| Welcome | Soviet Union | Paint-on-glass |
| Yamataro Comes Back | Japan | Traditional Animation |

== 1987 ==
| Name | Country | Technique |
|---|---|---|
| +1 -1 | Italy | Traditional Animation |
| Adieu bipède | Canada | Traditional Animation |
| The Adventures of Candy Claus | United States, Australia | Traditional Animation |
| Aquatic | Japan | Experimental |
| Baeus | Italy | Traditional Animation |
| Balloon Guy | United States | Computer Animation |
| Barbie and the Rockers: Out of This World | United States | Traditional Animation |
| Barbie and the Sensations: Rockin' Back to Earth | United States | Traditional Animation |
| Battle Can² | Japan | Traditional Animation |
| Bikkuriman: Taiichiji Seima Taisen | Japan | Traditional Animation |
| The Black Dog | United Kingdom | Traditional Animation |
| Blondie & Dagwood | United States | Traditional Animation |
| Body Jack: Tanoshii Yutai Ridatsu | Japan | Traditional Animation |
| Boku no Oldies wa All Color | Japan | Traditional Animation |
| Boom Boom Boom | United States | Computer Animation |
| Burning Love | United States | Computer Animation |
| Campus Special Investigator Hikaruon | Japan | Traditional Animation |
| Cathy | United States | Traditional Animation |
| Charlie Strapp and Froggy Ball | Sweden | Traditional Animation |
| A Chucklewood Easter | United States | Traditional Animation |
| A Claymation Christmas Celebration | United States | Stop-motion Animation |
| Dead Heat | Japan | Traditional Animation |
| Deja-Vu | United States | Computer Animation |
| Dorothy Meets Ozma of Oz | United States | Traditional Animation |
| Dougram vs. Round-Facer | Japan | Traditional Animation |
| The Duxorcist | United States | Traditional Animation |
| Elf 17 | Japan | Traditional Animation |
| Fabricated Rhythm | United States | Computer Animation |
| Face Like a Frog | United States | Traditional Animation |
| Frog and Toad Together | United States | Stop-motion Animation |
| A Garfield Christmas | United States | Traditional Animation |
| Garfield Goes Hollywood | United States | Traditional Animation |
| Girls Night Out | United Kingdom | Traditional Animation |
| George and Rosemary | Canada | Traditional Animation |
| How the Cossacks Met the Aliens | Soviet Union | Traditional Animation |
| How Wang-Fo Was Saved | France | Traditional Animation |
| In the Night Kitchen | United States | Traditional Animation |
| Kaguya-hime: Taketori Monogatari | Japan | Traditional Animation |
| Lazar | United States | Traditional Animation |
| Legend of the Forest, Part I | Japan | Traditional Animation |
| The Lesson | Soviet Union | Traditional Animation |
| Lupo the Butcher | Canada | Traditional Animation |
| Magic Bells | Soviet Union | Traditional Animation |
| Majokko Club Yoningumi A-Kukan Kara no Alien X | Japan | Traditional Animation |
| The Man Who Planted Trees | Canada | Traditional Animation |
| The Man Who Stole Dreams | Japan | Traditional Animation |
| Martinko | Soviet Union | Traditional Animation |
| Meerkats | Canada | Traditional Animation |
| A Mirthworm Masquerade | United States | Traditional Animation |
| Milroy, Santa's Misfit Mutt | United States | Traditional Animation |
| My Baby Just Cares for Me | United Kingdom | Live-action/stop-motion |
| Muramasa | Japan | Traditional Animation |
| Nagisa no Peppy | Japan | Computer Animation |
| Nat-chan no Akai Tebukuro | Japan | Traditional Animation |
| The Nightingale | Canada | Traditional Animation |
| Obake no Q-Tarō: Susume! 1/100 Daisakusen | Japan | Traditional Animation |
| Oilspot and Lipstick | United States | Computer Animation |
| Pants no Ana: Mambo de Ganbo! | Japan | Traditional Animation |
| Pink no Curtain | Japan | Traditional Animation |
| Pro Golfer Saru: Kōga Hikyō! Kage no Ninpō Golfer Sanjō! | Japan | Traditional Animation |
| Project Sci-VI | United States | Computer Animation |
| Purple Eyes in the Dark | Japan | Traditional Animation |
| Push | Japan | Traditional Animation |
| Red's Dream | United States | Computer Animation |
| The Reluctant Dragon | United Kingdom | Traditional Animation |
| Rigid Body | United States | Computer Animation |
| Ronald McDonald and the Adventure Machine | United States | Traditional Animation |
| Santabear's High Flying Adventure | United States | Traditional Animation |
| Sēd uz sliekšņa pasaciņa | Soviet Union | Traditional Animation |
| Shin Maple Town Monogatari: Palm Town-hen - Konnichiwa! Atarashii Machi | Japan | Traditional Animation |
| Sport Goofy in Soccermania | United States | Traditional Animation |
| Stanley and Stella in: Breaking the Ice | United States | Computer Animation |
| Star Trekkin' | United Kingdom | Stop-motion Animation |
| A Story | United States | Traditional Animation |
| The Super Dimension Fortress Macross: Flash Back 2012 | Japan | Traditional Animation |
| Tales of the Mouse Hockey League | Canada | Traditional Animation |
| Tekkamen o Oe! "d'Artagnan Monogatari" yori | Japan | Traditional Animation |
| The Three Fishketeers | United States | Traditional Animation |
| Time of the Angels | United States | Traditional Animation |
| A Warm Reception in L.A. | United States | Traditional Animation |
| Wendy and the Whine | United States | Traditional Animation |
| Your Face | United States | Traditional Animation |
| Yume kara, Samenai | Japan | Traditional Animation |

== 1988 ==
| Name | Country | Technique |
|---|---|---|
| Abel's Island | United States | Traditional Animation |
| Antique Heart | Japan | Traditional Animation |
| Arnold Escapes from Church | United States | Stop-motion Animation |
| Balthus - Tia's Radiance | Japan | Traditional Animation |
| Bikkuriman: Taiichiji Seima Taisen | Japan | Traditional Animation |
| Black Hula | Canada | Traditional Animation |
| Bluetoes, the Christmas Elf | Canada | Traditional Animation |
| Bugs vs. Daffy: Battle of the Music Video Stars | United States | Traditional Animation |
| Cap'n O. G. Readmore Meets Red Riding Hood | United States | Traditional Animation |
| Cap'n O. G. Readmore's Puss in Boots | United States | Traditional Animation |
| Cat and Clown | Soviet Union | Traditional Animation |
| The Cat Came Back | Canada | Traditional Animation |
| The Caterpillar and the Polliwog | United States | Traditional Animation |
| Cathy's Last Resort | United States | Traditional Animation |
| Christmas in Tattertown | United States | Traditional Animation |
| Cynical Hysterie Hour: Trip Coaster | Japan | Traditional Animation |
| Deimosu no Hanayome: Ran no Kumikyoku | Japan | Traditional Animation |
| Destructive David | United States | Traditional Animation |
| Dog Brain | Canada | Traditional Animation |
| Dragon Ball: Goku's Fire Brigade | Japan | Traditional Animation |
| Dragon Ball: Goku's Traffic Safety | Japan | Traditional Animation |
| Dragon's Heaven | Japan | Traditional Animation |
| Drawing Lesson #2 | United States | Traditional Animation |
| Fair, then Partly Piggy | Japan | Traditional Animation |
| Feeling from Mountain and Water | China | Traditional Animation |
| The Flintstone Kids' "Just Say No" Special | United States | Traditional Animation |
| Ganbare! Mōdōken Serve | Japan | Traditional Animation |
| The Hill Farm | United Kingdom | Traditional Animation |
| Joey Runs Away | United States | Traditional Animation |
| Kaitō Jigoma Ongakuhen | Japan | Traditional Animation |
| The Kitten from Lizyukov Street | Soviet Union | Traditional Animation |
| Lady Lady!! | Japan | Traditional Animation |
| Madeline | United States | Traditional Animation |
| Meet the Raisins! | United States | Stop-motion Animation |
| Mickey's Magical World | United States | Traditional Animation |
| Natsufuku no Shōjo-tachi | Japan | Traditional Animation |
| The Night of the Living Duck | United States | Traditional Animation |
| One of Those Days | United States | Traditional Animation |
| Particles Dreams | United States | Computer Animation |
| Peep and the Big Wide World | Canada | Traditional Animation |
| Pillow People Save Christmas | United States | Traditional Animation |
| RARG | United Kingdom | Traditional Animation |
| Ściany | Poland | Traditional Animation |
| Self-Portrait | Japan | Traditional Animation |
| Superstar: The Karen Carpenter Story | United States | Stop-motion Animation |
| Tatakae!! Ramenman | Japan | Traditional Animation |
| Technological Threat | United States | Traditional/computer |
| Ten Little Gall Force | Japan | Traditional Animation |
| The Thing What Lurked in the Tub | United States | Traditional Animation |
| Tin Toy | United States | Computer Animation |
| Ultra B: Black Hole kara no Dokusaisha BB!! | Japan | Traditional Animation |
| Virile Games | Czechoslovakia | Live-action/stop-motion |
| The Wild Puffalumps | Canada | Traditional Animation |

== 1989 ==
| Name | Country | Technique |
|---|---|---|
| 25 Ways to Quit Smoking | United States | Traditional Animation |
| Akuma-kun: Gekijōban | Japan | Traditional Animation |
| Aliens Next Door | United States | Traditional Animation |
| The Angel and the Soldier Boy | United Kingdom | Traditional Animation |
| Animated Self-Portraits | Canada, Czechoslovakia, Japan, United States | Various |
| Anniversary | Canada | Computer/live-action |
| Balance | West Germany | Stop-motion Animation |
| Beauty and the Beast | Danish | Stop-motion Animation |
| Be-Boy Kidnapp'n Idol | Japan | Traditional Animation |
| Beetle Bailey | United States | Traditional Animation |
| Bermudų žiedas | Lithuania | Traditional Animation |
| The Betty Boop Movie Mystery | United States | Traditional Animation |
| Blondie & Dagwood: Second Wedding Workout | United States | Traditional Animation |
| Bugs Bunny's Wild World of Sports | United States | Traditional Animation |
| Burning Yearning | New Zealand | Traditional Animation |
| The Butter Battle Book | United States | Traditional Animation |
| Cathy's Valentine | United States | Traditional Animation |
| The Chore | United States | Traditional Animation |
| Cipher the Video | Japan | Traditional Animation |
| The Cow | Soviet Union | Paint-on-glass |
| Cranium Command | United States | Traditional Animation |
| Creature Comforts | United Kingdom | Stop-motion Animation |
| Cynical Hysterie Hour: Henshin! | Japan | Traditional Animation |
| Cynical Hysterie Hour: Utakata no Uta | Japan | Traditional Animation |
| Cynical Hysterie Hour: Yoru wa Tanoshii | Japan | Traditional Animation |
| D.A.R.E. Bear Yogi | United States | Traditional Animation |
| Darkness Light Darkness | Czechoslovakia | Stop-motion Animation |
| Demon Hunter Makaryūdo | Japan | Traditional Animation |
| Dorami-chan: Mini-Dora SOS!!! | Japan | Traditional Animation |
| Egoli | United Kingdom | Traditional Animation |
| Eternity | Canada | Traditional Animation |
| Eurythmy | United States | Computer Animation |
| Flora | Czechoslovakia | Live-action/stop-motion |
| Flying Logos | United States | Computer Animation |
| Garfield's Babes and Bullets | United States | Traditional Animation |
| Garfield's Thanksgiving | United States | Traditional Animation |
| A Grand Day Out | United Kingdom | Stop-motion Animation |
| Granpa | United Kingdom | Traditional Animation |
| Hägar the Horrible: Hägar Knows Best | United States | Traditional Animation |
| Hello Kitty no Cinderella | Japan | Traditional Animation |
| Hound Town | United States | Traditional Animation |
| How to Kiss | United States | Traditional Animation |
| Himitsu no Akko-chan | Japan | Traditional Animation |
| Himitsu no Akko-chan: Umi da! Obake da!! Natsu Matsuri | Japan | Traditional Animation |
| Inamura no Hi | Japan | Traditional Animation |
| Istruzioni per l’uso | Italy | Traditional Animation |
| Juke-Bar | Canada | Stop-motion Animation |
| Knick Knack | United States | Computer Animation |
| The Limited Bird | United States | Traditional Animation |
| Little Golden Book Land | United States | Traditional Animation |
| Locomotion | United States | Computer Animation |
| The Making of Me | United States | Traditional Animation |
| Marvin: Baby of the Year | United States | Traditional Animation |
| Meat Love | Czechoslovakia | Live-action/stop-motion |
| Megacycles | United States | Computer Animation |
| Mirthworms on Stage | United States | Traditional Animation |
| Morris Goes to School | United States | Stop-motion Animation |
| My Dog Zero | United States | Traditional Animation |
| My Melody no Akazukin | Japan | Traditional Animation |
| Osomatsu-kun: Suika no Hoshi Kara Konnichiwa zansu! | Japan | Traditional Animation |
| The Railway Dragon | Canada | Traditional Animation |
| Richard Scarry's Best ABC Video Ever! | United States | Traditional Animation |
| Richard Scarry's Best Counting Video Ever! | United States | Traditional Animation |
| Stanley and the Dinosaurs | United States | Stop-motion Animation |
| Super Mario's Fire Brigade | Japan | Traditional Animation |
| The Sneetches | Soviet Union | Traditional Animation |
| The Teddy Bears' Picnic | Canada | Traditional Animation |
| Tummy Trouble | United States | Traditional/live-action |
| War Story | United Kingdom | Stop-motion Animation |
| The Wave | United States | Computer Animation |
| The Witch Who Turned Pink | United States | Traditional Animation |
| X-Men: Pryde of the X-Men | United States | Traditional Animation |
