= Carol Johnston =

Canadian competitive gymnast

Personal information
- Nickname: Lefty
- Born: March 10, 1958 Calgary, Alberta, Canada
- Died: May 11, 2019 (aged 61)
- Education: Cal State Fullerton, USA
- Years active: 1970-1980
- Height: 4 ft 10 in (147 cm)
- Spouse: Scott D. Koniar

Sport
- Sport: Women's Artistic Gymnastics
- Disability: No arm below right elbow (from birth)
- College team: Cal State Fullerton Titans(1977-1980)
- Coached by: Lynn Rogers (1977-1980)
- Retired: 1980

Achievements and titles
- National finals: WCAA 1977 balance beam conference champion; AIAW 1978 All-America honors beam; AIAW 1978 All-America honors floor exercise; NCAA 1978 second place beam; NCAA 1978 second place floor exercise
- Updated on 19 March 2016

Carol Johnston (March 10, 1958 - May 11, 2019) was a Canadian competitive gymnast, born without a right arm below her elbow. Despite her disability, Johnston became a collegiate gymnastics champion and was featured in Disney's 1980 TV film "Lefty".

== Early life ==
Carol Johnston was born on March 10, 1958, in Calgary, Alberta. At first, she planned on going into figure skating. She began gymnastics to strengthen her legs for figure skating, but then she fell in love with the sport and started training at the Altadore Gymnastics Club in Calgary at age 12. During a visit to Canada in 1976, gymnastics coach Lynn Rogers was introduced to Johnston and offered her a spot on the gymnastics squad at California State University, Fullerton, which she accepted.

== Competitions ==
In 1975, Johnston performed in the Canada Winter Games, and the following year she competed at the Junior Olympics in Montreal and at the Hawaii Invitationals.

After that, she competed four seasons with the Titans at Cal State Fullerton from 1977 to 1980. As a Fullerton Titan, she became Western Collegiate Athletic Association conference champion on the balance beam in 1977, runner-up in the NCAA meet at Seattle, in both beam and floor, in 1978, and was two-time-All-American as awarded by the Association for Intercollegiate Athletics for Women on balance beam and floor exercise. In the first three seasons in which she competed for the Titans, the Cal State Fullerton gymnastics squad compiled a record of 45–0 in meets.

In 1979, she was determined to win the gold at the NCAA championships. However, she tore her anterior cruciate ligament during a fall from uneven bars in the warm-up for a competition against UCLA and was unable to finish the meet. Her leg was in a cast for eight weeks, and she was unable to compete the rest of the season. She said that the injury was the first time she truly felt disabled. After her injury, she made a comeback for the 1980 season, but re-injured her knee again and underwent major knee reconstruction surgery. On the advice of doctors, she retired from competitive gymnastics.

== Life after retirement from competitive gymnastics ==
Johnston graduated from California State University, Fullerton in 1981 and in 1988 graduated with a Masters in physical education with a specialization in sports psychology from Cal State. She settled in California, worked in human resources and personnel management, taught gymnastics part-time, and did some public speaking.

In 1992, Johnston was given the Outstanding Achievement Award by the Orange County Committee for Employment of Persons with Disabilities.

In October 2013, she was inducted into Cal State Fullerton Athletics Hall of Fame, where it was revealed that she had been diagnosed with early-onset Alzheimer's disease in 2012. With support of her husband, Scott D. Koniar, and friends, she tried to have a life as normal as possible. She died on May 11, 2019, due to complications from Alzheimer's.

== In media ==
In 1979, a documentary short on Johnston was made by Disney, entitled The Truly Exceptional: Carol Johnston that was shown in schools; this was one in the series of The Truly Exceptional by Walt Disney Educational short films, aiming to show how people live with disabilities. That short was later made into an expanded version that first aired on 21st September 1980 on NBC's Disney's Wonderful World, as the TV movie "Lefty". Johnston was initially reluctant to be filmed, but she changed her mind after speaking with Rogers.

In 1982, she was the subject of a book by Pete Donovan titled Carol Johnston: One-Armed Gymnast.
