= Beauty and the Bull =

1954 film by Larry Lansburgh

- Directed by: Larry Lansburgh
- Written by: Janet Lansburgh
- Produced by: Cedric Francis
- Starring: Bette Ford; Marvin Miller; Pepe Ortiz
- Narrated by: Marvin Miller
- Cinematography: J. Carlos Carbajal
- Edited by: Rex Steele
- Music by: William Lava; Howard Jackson
- Production company: The Vitaphone Corporation
- Distributed by: Warner Bros.
- Release date: December 24, 1954
- Running time: 17 minutes
- Country: United States
- Languages: English; Spanish

Beauty and the Bull is a 1954 Warner Bros. biographical short film.

The film described the bullfighting career of actress turned toreador, Bette Ford. It was directed by Larry Lansburgh, written by Janet Lansburgh, and narrated by Marvin Miller. It is 17 minutes long, and was made using Warner Bros. Warnercolor film, and Vitaphone sound-on-disc technology.

The film was nominated in 1955 for an Academy Award in the Best Short Subject, Two Reel, category.
