= The Lottery (1989 film) =

- Directed by: Garry Marshall
- Produced by: Debra Hill
- Starring: Bette Midler
- Cinematography: Billy Williams
- Music by: James Patrick Dunne
- Production company: The Walt Disney Company
- Distributed by: Walt Disney World
- Release date: May 1, 1989 (Disney-MGM Studios)
- Running time: 3 minutes
- Country: United States
- Language: English

The Lottery is a 1989 American comedy short film starring Bette Midler and directed by Garry Marshall which was shown at the then Disney-MGM Studios in line for the first versions of the Studio Backlot Tour.

== Plot ==
Bette Midler stars as a music teacher giving a singing lesson to a student in her apartment. She suddenly wins the lottery but quickly loses the ticket when it is swept out her window by a gust of wind and subsequently chases the ticket all over New York City. A pigeon helps retrieve it for her and she spends some of her winnings to buy a golden statue of the pigeon.

== Production ==
The Lottery was shot on February 3, 1989, at Disney-MGM Studios on the New York City backlot set and it took a crew of over 100 people to produce.

It was the first film to be completely filmed at the Disney-MGM Studios theme park.

It was used to demonstrate general filmmaking, the use of exterior sets and soundstage sets, special effects and stunts.

== See also ==
- List of Disney live-action shorts
- List of Disney's Hollywood Studios attractions
