= The Hohenzollerns in America =

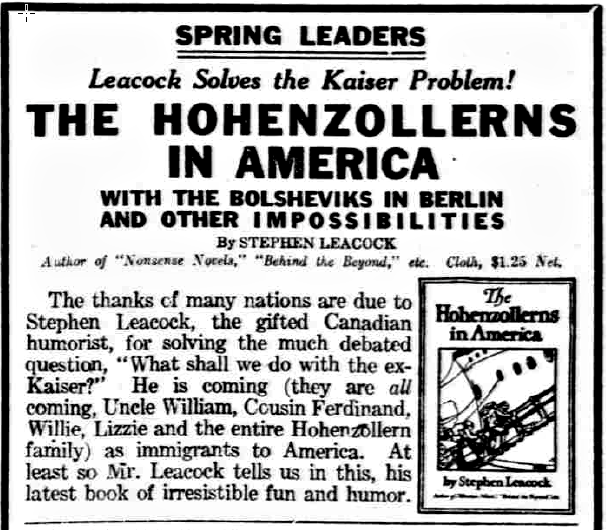
Newspaper ad for the book

The Hohenzollerns in America: With the Bolsheviks in Berlin and Other Impossibilities is a sequence of stories by Stephen Leacock, first published in 1919. The title references the Hohenzollerns coming to America as simple immigrants and an imagined Bolshevik government taking power in Germany.

A work of war fiction, it "reflected the rhetoric of imperialism, total victory and Germanophobia that effective propaganda had made an intrinsic part of wartime discourse in Canada". One researcher suggests it can be seen as both propaganda and literature. The work has received little critical attention since it was published. Another reviewer suggests it be seen as a work of historical fantasy, based on "current events and the chauvinism of World War I", not written in Leacock's usual nonsensical style but as a work of "rancorous satire".

The stories feature stereotypical immigrant character types, "women adhered to their husbands' beliefs that it was a 'woman's lot to bear and to suffer'".

A German language version of the book was published in 1989, as Die Hohenzollern in Amerika und andere Satiren (The Hohenzollern[s] in America and other Satires).
