= People & Places =

Documentary film series

People & Places is a series of short subject documentary films released by Walt Disney Productions from 1953 to 1960 and was later revived in 2024. The original series (except The Alaskan Eskimo, Siam, Sardinia, and The Blue Men of Morocco) was filmed in CinemaScope in various locations around the world.

The original series received critical acclaim, including four Academy Award nominations and three wins for Best Two Reel Live Action Short.

In October 2019, Disney announced the studio would revive the series for the Disney+ streaming service, with the production company Supper Club producing the initial releases. In November 2023, Disney acquired the short subject documentary film Nǎi Nai & Wài Pó by filmmaker Sean Wang. The short had premiered at the South by Southwest film festival in March 2023 and relaunched the series in February 2024; Nǎi Nai & Wài Pó would start airing on Disney+ on February 9, 2024. The short received a nomination for the Academy Award for Best Documentary Short Film. On June 17, 2025, it was announced that four additional shorts were set to be released the following month.

== Original series ==
#	Title	Release date	Director	Home release	Notes
1	The Alaskan Eskimo	February 18, 1953	James Algar		Won the Academy Award for Best Documentary Short
2	Siam	December 24, 1954	Ralph Wright		Nominated for the Academy Award for Best Live Action Short (Two Reel)
3	Switzerland	June 16, 1955	Ben Sharpsteen		Released with Lady and the Tramp. Nominated for the Academy Award for Best Live Action Short (Two Reel)
4	Men Against the Arctic	December 21, 1955	Winston Hibler		Released with both The Littlest Outlaw and The Great Locomotive Chase. Won the Academy Award for Best Documentary Short
5	Sardinia	February 15, 1956	Ben Sharpsteen		
6	Disneyland, U.S.A.	December 20, 1956	Hamilton S. Luske	Walt Disney Treasures: Disneyland-Secrets, Stories and Magic	Released with Westward Ho, the Wagons!.
7	Samoa	December 25, 1956	Ben Sharpsteen		Nominated for the Academy Award for Best Live Action Short (Two Reel)
8	Blue Men of Morocco	February 14, 1957	Ralph Wright		Released with a Snow White and the Seven Dwarfs re-release
9	Lapland	July 3, 1957	Ben Sharpsteen		Released with a Snow White and the Seven Dwarfs re-release
10	Portugal	December 25, 1957	Ben Sharpsteen		Released with Old Yeller. Nominated for the Academy Award for Best Live Action Short.
11	Wales	June 10, 1958	Geoffrey Foot		
12	Scotland	June 11, 1958	Geoffrey Foot		
13	Ama Girls	July 9, 1958	Ben Sharpsteen		Won the Academy Award for Best Short Subject Documentary. Released with The Light in the Forest. Later released on 16mm as Japan Harvests the Sea.
14	Seven Cities of Antarctica	December 25, 1958	Winston Hibler		Released with Tonka
15	Cruise of the Eagle	March 19, 1959	Ben Sharpsteen		Released with The Shaggy Dog
16	Japan	April 6, 1960	Ben Sharpsteen		
17	The Danube	April 27, 1960	Ben Sharpsteen		

== Revival ==
#	Title	Release date	Director	Release	Notes
1	Nǎi Nai & Wài Pó	February 9, 2024	Sean Wang	Disney+	Nominated for the Academy Award for Best Live Action Short
2	The Academy	July 9, 2025	Julia Jansch	Disney+	
3	Camp Alec	July 9, 2025	Christopher Stoudt	Disney+	
4	I Scream, You Scream	July 9, 2025	Ashley Brandon	Disney+	
5	Sophie and the Baron	July 9, 2025	Alexandria Jackson	Disney+	

== DVD release ==
"Disneyland U.S.A." was released as part of the limited edition Disney Treasures DVD entitled "Walt Disney Treasures: Disneyland Secrets, Stories & Magic".

== See also ==
- List of Disney live-action shorts
- True-Life Adventures
