= The Garden of Folly =

1924 satire book by Stephen Leacock

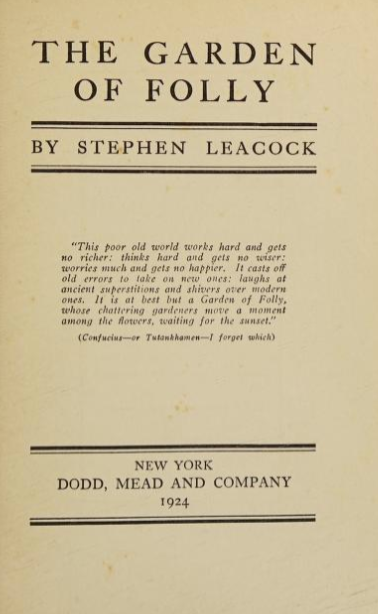
- Title page for The Garden of Folly (1924)
- Author: Stephen Leacock
- Language: English
- Genre: Humour, Satire
- Publication date: 1924
- Publication place: Canada

The Garden of Folly is a work of satire, published by Stephen Leacock in 1924. The prosperity of the 1920s and Prohibition serve as targets.

== Critical reception ==
"Taken piecemeal, Stephen Leacock's fun becomes the real humor of all sorts of things that we take with over-ponderous seriousness. "The Garden of Folly", under this acceptance, becomes a true garden through which we walk delighted and refreshed."

== Legacy ==
Quotations from the book were still cited as of 2017, used to illustrate the deceptive nature of advertising and the fake news cycle.
