= David Anderson (animator) =

David Alexander Anderson (1952–2015) was a director of animated films.

In 1983, he won a BAFTA Award for Dreamland Express. Dreamless Sleep won the Hiroshima Prize at the 2nd International Animation Festival Hiroshima in 1987. Deadsy and the Sexo-Chanjo received a BAFTA nomination in 1991. Door also won several awards at major international film festivals.

== Biography ==
Dreamland Express takes its inspiration from a children's book of 1927 by the illustrator H. R. Millar.

== Filmography ==
- In the Time of Angels (which he also wrote)
- Deadsy and the Sexo-Chanjo
- Dreamless Sleep
- Door (Both Deadsy and Door came under the heading "Deadtime Stories for Big Folk")
- Dreamland Express
- The Tongue of the Hidden (2007)
