= Janet Lansburgh =

American screenwriter

- Born: Janet Martin; February 11, 1911
- Died: September 4, 1973 (aged 62); Los Angeles, California
- Occupation(s): Screenwriter, director
- Spouse: Larry Lansburgh

Janet Lansburgh (born Janet Martin) was an American screenwriter and director known for her work on Walt Disney productions of the 1950s and 1960s. She often worked with her husband, Larry Lansburgh.

Janet began working for Walt Disney as a publicist beginning in the late 1930s, and she and Larry would later work as writers for the studio. Their 1957 short film The Wetback Hound won the Oscar for Best Live Action Short Film at the Academy Awards in 1958.

== Selected works ==
- Run, Appaloosa, Run (1966) (writer)
- The Tattooed Police Horse (1964) (writer)
- The Horse with the Flying Tail (1960) (writer)
- The Wetback Hound (1957) (director)
- Cow Dog (1956) (writer) (uncredited)
- Beauty and the Bull (1954) (writer)
- Mystery Lake (1953) (writer)
- Desert Killer (1952) (writer)
