= Bob Singer =

American animator (born 1928)

- Born: 1928 (age 97–98); Santa Barbara, California, U.S.

Bob Singer (born 1928) is an American animation artist, character designer, layout and background artist and storyboard director of animated television programs, most memorably of several Hanna-Barbera productions such as The Flintstones, Jonny Quest, Scooby-Doo, Yogi Bear, Droopy, Tom and Jerry, The Jetsons, The Smurfs, Super Friends, Richie Rich and the Harlem Globetrotters cartoons.

== Life and career ==
Bob was born in 1928 in Santa Barbara and raised in Santa Paula. He attended the Art Center College of Design in Los Angeles and graduated in 1955 with honors and a BPA.

He worked at Carson/Roberts Advertising until 1956, then entered the fledgling Los Angeles television animation industry. During his tenure there he worked for such companies as Marvel, Hanna-Barbera, UPA, Shamus Culhane and Warner Bros. He drew The Flintstones and Yogi Bear newspaper comics.

Hanna-Barbera used Bob's talents for 27 years, and during that time he worked on many of the most popular Hanna-Barbera television shows. He was the founding creator of their character design department, layout department head, and later became art director of publicity. He also served as a guest lecturer at the University of Southern California, and several local high schools.

The Singer/Bandy Group was established in 1988, and for two years he designed coloring books, cassette covers, greeting cards, plush dolls, picture puzzles and illustrated children's books. Bob returned to Hanna-Barbera in 1990 as a storyboard director and animation cel art designer.

Singer is a member of the Academy of Motion Picture Arts and Sciences, and has been for over 45 years. He creates animation artwork for galleries and collectors, and designing limited edition prints for Clampett Studio Collections. His personal appearances, lecturing and teaching about storyboarding and animation practices have been well received throughout the continental U.S., Hawaii, England, and Australia. The children's literature Studio Group "Studio 5" holds Bob Singer as their most senior member, and most valuable information and experience source.

He authored the animation storyboard book How to Draw Animation Storyboards in 1992, and is currently working on his autobiography.

Singer also appeared as the voice of Rot in the 1985 syndicated cartoon special A Pumpkin Full of Nonsense, based on Selchow and Righter's Scrabble People property.
