= Stephen Leacock =

Canadian writer and economist

Stephen Leacock FRSC
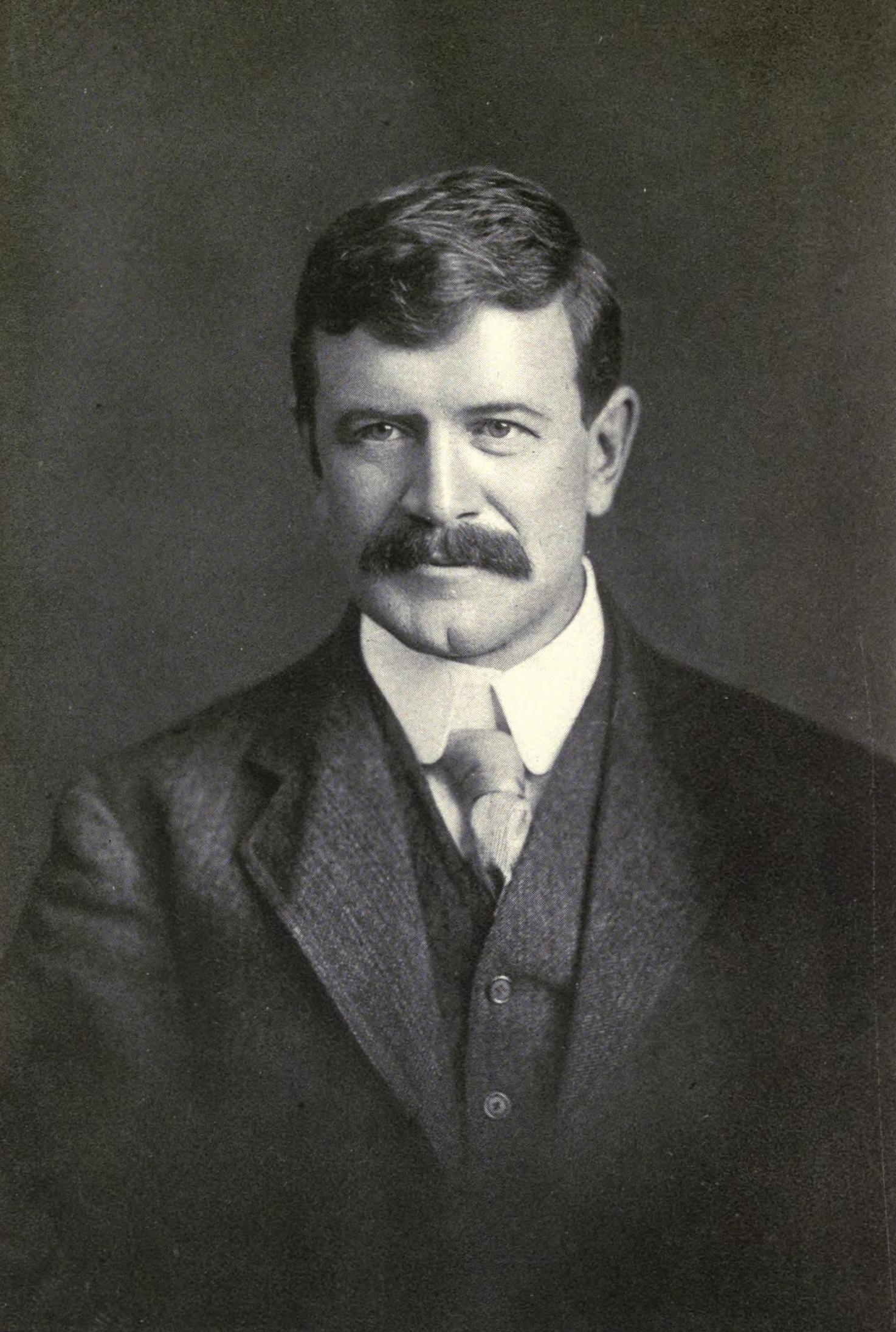
- Leacock, c. 1913
- Born: Stephen Butler Leacock; 30 December 1869; Swanmore, Hampshire, England
- Died: 28 March 1944 (aged 74); Toronto, Ontario, Canada
- Education: Upper Canada College
- Alma mater: University of Toronto; University of Chicago
- Writing career
- Language: English
- Genre: Humour
- Subject: Sciences
- Notable works: Sunshine Sketches of a Little Town; Arcadian Adventures with the Idle Rich; My Financial Career
- Notable awards: Lorne Pierce Medal, Fellow of the Royal Society of Canada

Stephen Butler Leacock (30 December 1869 – 28 March 1944) was a Canadian teacher, political scientist, writer, and humourist. From 1915 to 1925, he was the best-known English-speaking humourist in the world.

== Early life ==
Stephen Leacock was born on 30 December 1869 in Swanmore, a village near Southampton in Southern England. He was the third of the eleven children born to (Walter) Peter Leacock (1834-1940), who was born and grew up at Oak Hill on the Isle of Wight, an estate that his grandfather had purchased after returning from Madeira where his family had made a fortune out of plantations and Leacock's Madeira wine, founded in 1760. Stephen's mother, Agnes, was born at Soberton, the youngest daughter by his second wife (Caroline Linton Palmer) of the Rev. Stephen Butler, of Bury Lodge, the Butler estate that overlooked the village of Hambledon, Hampshire. Stephen Butler (for whom Leacock was named), was the maternal grandson of Admiral James Richard Dacres and a brother of Sir Thomas Dacres Butler, Usher of the Black Rod. Leacock's mother was the half-sister of Major Thomas Adair Butler, who won the Victoria Cross at the siege and capture of Lucknow in India.

Peter's father, Thomas Murdock Leacock J.P., had already conceived plans eventually to send his son out to the colonies, but when he discovered that at age eighteen Peter had married Agnes Butler without his permission, almost immediately he shipped them out to South Africa where he had bought them a farm. The farm in South Africa failed and Stephen's parents returned to Hampshire, where he was born. When Stephen was six, the family moved to Canada, where they settled on a farm near the village of Sutton, Ontario, and the shores of Lake Simcoe. Their farm in the township of Georgina was also unsuccessful, and the family was kept afloat by money sent from Leacock's paternal grandfather. Stephen's father, Peter, became an alcoholic; in the fall of 1878, Peter travelled west to Manitoba with his brother E.P. Leacock (the subject of Stephen's book My Remarkable Uncle, published in 1942), leaving behind Agnes and the children.

Stephen Leacock, always of obvious intelligence, was sent by his grandfather to the elite private school of Upper Canada College in Toronto, also attended by his older brothers, where he was top of the class and was chosen as head boy. Leacock graduated in 1887, and returned home to find that his father had returned from Manitoba. Soon after, his father left the family again and never returned. There is some disagreement about what happened to Peter Leacock. One scenario is that he went to live in Argentina, while other sources indicate that he moved to Nova Scotia and changed his name to Lewis.

In 1887, seventeen-year-old Leacock started at University College at the University of Toronto, where he was admitted to the Zeta Psi fraternity. His first year was bankrolled by a small scholarship, but Leacock found he could not return to his studies the following year because of financial difficulties. He left university to work as a teacher—an occupation he disliked immensely—at Strathroy, Uxbridge and finally in Toronto. As a teacher at Upper Canada College, his alma mater, he was able simultaneously to attend classes at the University of Toronto and, in 1891, earn his degree through part-time studies. It was during this period that his first writing was published in The Varsity, a campus newspaper.

== Academic and political life ==
Disillusioned with teaching, in 1899 he began graduate studies at the University of Chicago under Thorstein Veblen, where he received a doctorate in political science and political economy. He moved from Chicago, Illinois, to Montreal, Quebec, where he eventually became the William Dow Professor of Political Economy and long-time chair of the Department of Economics and Political Science at McGill University.

He was closely associated with Sir Arthur Currie, former commander of the Canadian Corps in the Great War and principal of McGill from 1919 until his death in 1933. In fact, Currie had been a student observing Leacock's practice teaching in Strathroy in 1888. In 1936, Leacock was forcibly retired by the McGill Board of Governors—an unlikely prospect had Currie lived.

Leacock was both a social conservative and a partisan Conservative. He opposed giving women the right to vote, and had a mixed record on non-British immigration, having written both in support of expanding immigration beyond Anglo-Saxons before World War II and in opposition to expanding Canadian immigration beyond Anglo-Saxons near the close of World War II. He was a staunch champion of the British Empire and the Imperial Federation Movement and went on lecture tours to further the cause. Despite his conservatism, he was a staunch advocate of social welfare legislation and wealth redistribution. He is considered today by some a complicated and controversial historical figure for his views and writings. He was a longtime believer in the superiority of the English and could be racist towards blacks and Indigenous peoples.

Although Prime Minister R. B. Bennett asked him to be a candidate for the 1935 Dominion election, Leacock declined the invitation. He did stump for local Conservative candidates at his summer home.

Leacock is mostly forgotten as an economist; "What was for many years a virtually final judgement of Leacock's scholarly work was pronounced by Harold Innis in a 1938 lecture at the University of Toronto. That lecture, which was intended to pay tribute to Leacock as one of the founders of Canadian social studies, was eventually published as his obituary in 1944 in the Canadian Journal of Economics and Political Science. Innis glossed over Leacock's economics in the article and largely dismissed his humorous writings. For a number of years, Leacock used John Stuart Mill's text, Principles of Political Economy, in his course at McGill entitled Elements of Political Economy. According to one source, Leacock's light-hearted and increasingly superficial approach with his political science writings ensured that they are largely forgotten by the public and in academic circles.

== Literary life ==
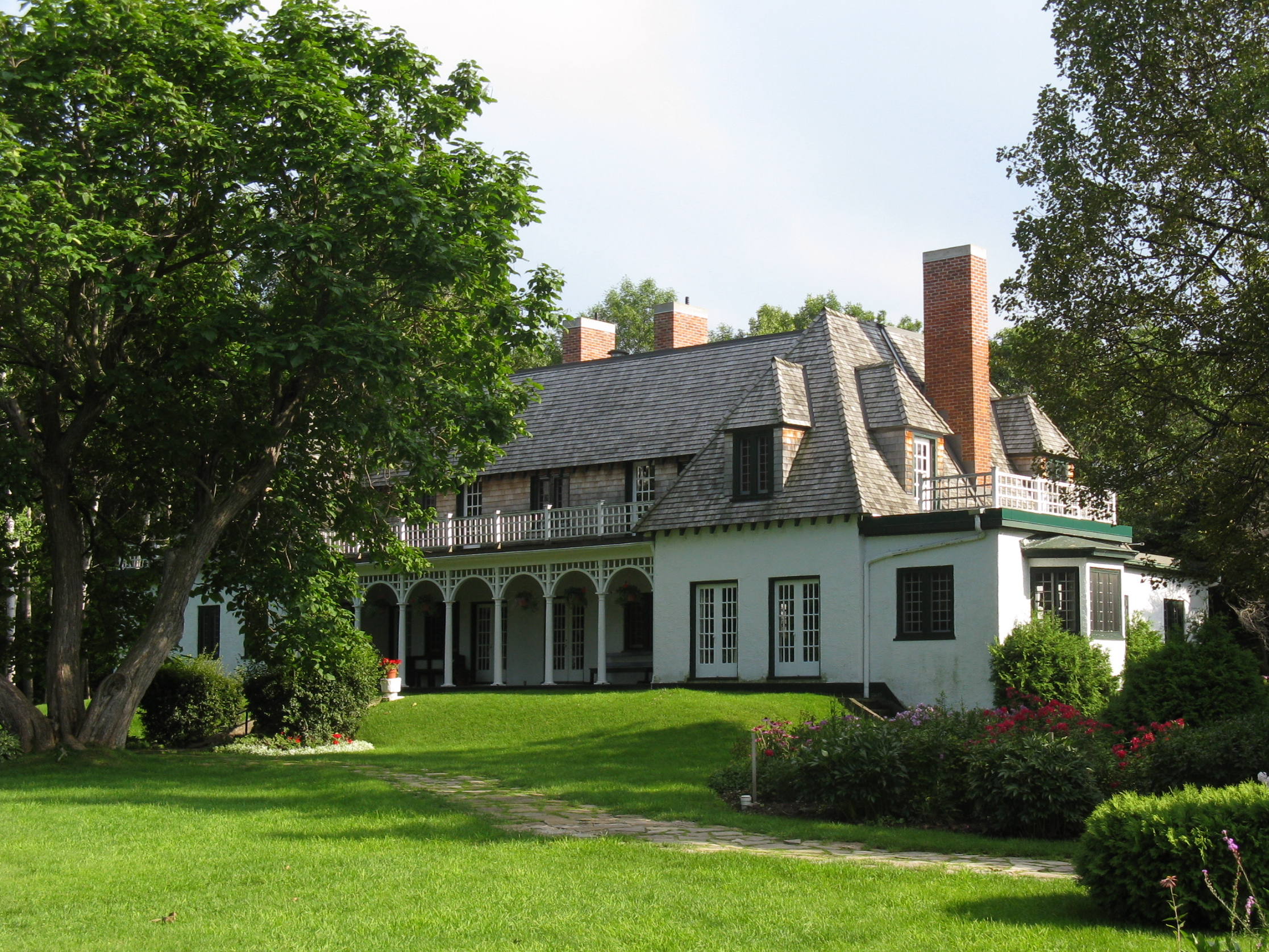
Stephen Leacock House in Orillia, Ontario

Early in his career, Leacock turned to fiction, humour, and short reports to supplement (and ultimately exceed) his regular income. His stories, first published in magazines in Canada and the United States and later in novel form, became extremely popular around the world. From 1915 to 1925, Leacock was the most popular humourist in the English-speaking world.

A humourist particularly admired by Leacock was Robert Benchley from New York. Leacock opened correspondence with Benchley, encouraging him in his work and importuning him to compile his work into a book. Benchley did so in 1922, and acknowledged Leacock's encouragement.

Near the end of his life, the US comedian Jack Benny recounted how he had been introduced to Leacock's writing by Groucho Marx when they were both young vaudeville comedians. Benny acknowledged Leacock's influence and, fifty years after first reading him, still considered Leacock one of his favourite comic writers. He was puzzled as to why Leacock's work was no longer well known in the United States.

During the summer months, Leacock lived at Old Brewery Bay, his summer estate in Orillia, across Lake Simcoe from where he was raised and also bordering Lake Couchiching. A working farm, Old Brewery Bay is now a museum and National Historic Site of Canada. Gossip provided by the local barber, Jefferson Short, provided Leacock with the material which would become Sunshine Sketches of a Little Town (1912), set in the thinly-disguised Mariposa.

Leacock was awarded the Royal Society of Canada's Lorne Pierce Medal in 1937, nominally for his academic work.

=== Memorial Medal for Humour ===
The Stephen Leacock Associates is a foundation chartered to preserve the literary legacy of Stephen Leacock, and oversee the annual award of the Stephen Leacock Memorial Medal for Humour. It is a prestigious honour, given to encourage Canadian humour writing and awarded for the best at Canadian humour writing. The foundation was instituted in 1946 and awarded the first Leacock Medal in 1947. The presentation occurs in June each year at the Stephen Leacock Award Dinner, at the Geneva Park Conference Centre in Orillia, Ontario.

== Personal life ==
Leacock was born in England in 1869. His father, Peter Leacock, and his mother, Agnes Emma Butler Leacock, were both from well-to-do families. The family, eventually consisting of eleven children, immigrated to Canada in 1876, settling on a one hundred-acre farm in Sutton, Ontario. There Stephen was home-schooled until he was enrolled in Upper Canada College, Toronto. He became the head boy in 1887, and then entered the University of Toronto to study languages and literature. Despite completing two years of study in one year, he was forced to leave the university because his father had abandoned the family. Instead, Leacock enrolled in a three-month course at Strathroy Collegiate Institute to become a qualified high-school teacher.

His first appointment was at the then Uxbridge High School in Uxbridge, Ontario, but he was soon offered a post at Upper Canada College, where he remained from 1889 through 1899. At this time, he also resumed part-time studies at the University of Toronto, graduating with a B.A. in 1891. However, Leacock's real interests were turning towards economics and political theory, and in 1899 he was accepted for postgraduate studies at the University of Chicago, where he earned his PhD in 1903.

In 1900 Leacock married Beatrix Hamilton, niece of Sir Henry Pellatt, who had built Casa Loma, the largest castle in North America. In 1915, after 15 years of marriage, the couple had their only child, Stephen Lushington Leacock. While Leacock doted on the boy, it soon became apparent that "Stevie" suffered from a lack of growth hormone. Growing to be only four feet tall, he had a love-hate relationship with Leacock, who tended to treat him like a child. Beatrix died in 1925 due to breast cancer. His son remained a bachelor and died in Sutton in 1974.

Leacock was offered a post at McGill University, where he remained until he retired in 1936. In 1906, he wrote Elements of Political Science, which remained a standard college textbook for the next twenty years and became his most profitable book. He also began public speaking and lecturing, and he took a year's leave of absence in 1907 to speak throughout Canada on the subject of national unity. He typically spoke on national unity or the British Empire for the rest of his life.

Leacock began submitting articles to the Toronto humour magazine Grip in 1894, and soon was publishing many humorous articles in Canadian and US magazines. In 1910, he privately published the best of these as Literary Lapses. The book was spotted by a British publisher, John Lane, who brought out editions in London and New York, assuring Leacock's future as a writer. This was confirmed by Literary Lapses (1910), Nonsense Novels (1911) – probably his best books of humorous sketches—and by the more sentimental favourite, Sunshine Sketches of a Little Town (1912). John Lane introduced the young cartoonist Annie Fish to illustrate his 1913 book Behind the Beyond. Leacock's humorous style was reminiscent of Mark Twain and Charles Dickens at their sunniest – for example, in his book My Discovery of England (1922). However, his Arcadian Adventures with the Idle Rich (1914) is a darker collection that satirizes city life. Collections of sketches continued to follow almost annually at times, with a mixture of whimsy, parody, nonsense, and satire that was never bitter.

Leacock was enormously popular not only in Canada but in the United States and Britain. In later life, Leacock wrote on the art of humour writing and also published biographies of Twain and Dickens. After retirement, a lecture tour to western Canada led to his book My Discovery of the West: A Discussion of East and West in Canada (1937), for which he won the Governor General's Award. He also won the Mark Twain medal and received a number of honorary doctorates. Other nonfiction books on Canadian topics followed and he began work on an autobiography. Leacock died of throat cancer in Toronto in 1944. A prize for the best humour writing in Canada was named after him, and his house at Orillia on the banks of Lake Couchiching became the Stephen Leacock Museum.

== Death and tributes ==
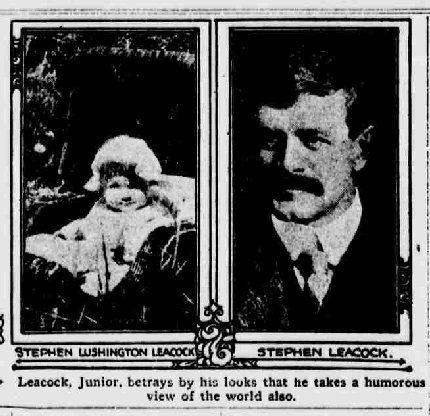
Leacock and his son in 1916

Predeceased by his wife, Beatrix, who had died of breast cancer in 1925, Leacock was survived by son Stevie (Stephen Lushington Leacock (1915–1974). In accordance with his wishes, after his death from throat cancer, Leacock was buried in the St George the Martyr Churchyard (St. George's Church, Sibbald Point), Sutton, Ontario.

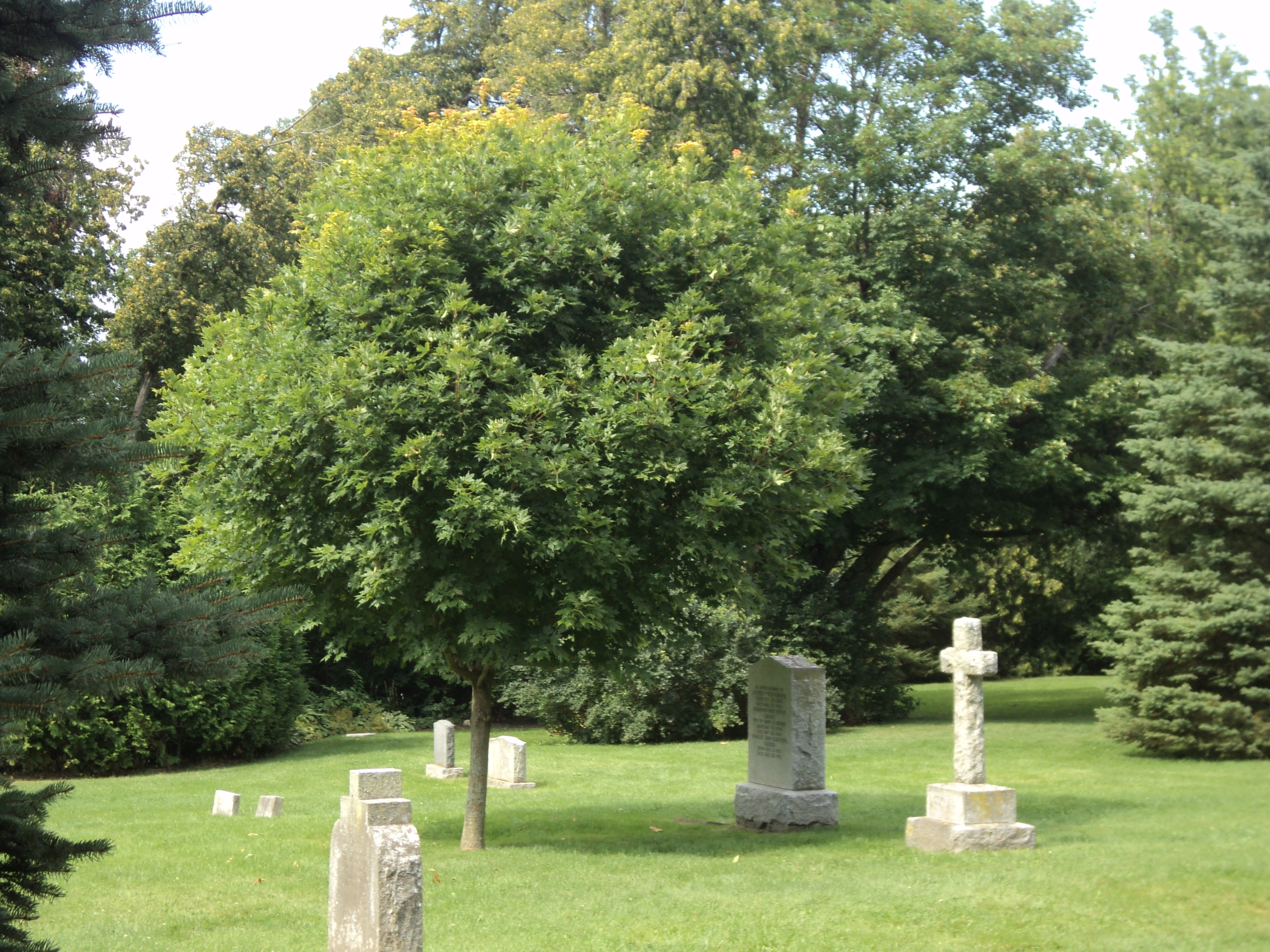
Leacock's grave (shaded) in the churchyard in Sibbald's Point

Shortly after his death, Barbara Nimmo, his niece, literary executor and benefactor, published two major posthumous works: Last Leaves (1945) and The Boy I Left Behind Me (1946). His summer cottage became derelict, and was declared a National Historic Site of Canada in 1958. It currently operates as a museum called the Stephen Leacock Museum National Historic Site.

In 1947, the Stephen Leacock Award was created to meet the best in Canadian literary humour. In 1969, the centennial of his birth, Canada Post issued a six-cent stamp with his image on it. The following year, the Stephen Leacock Centennial Committee had a plaque erected at his English birthplace and a mountain in Yukon was named after him.

A number of buildings in Canada are named after Leacock, including the Stephen Leacock Building at McGill University, Stephen Leacock Public School in Ottawa, a theatre in Keswick, Ontario, and a school Stephen Leacock Collegiate Institute in Toronto.

== Adaptations ==
Two Leacock short stories have been adapted as National Film Board of Canada animated shorts by Gerald Potterton: My Financial Career and The Awful Fate of Melpomenus Jones. Sunshine Sketches, based on Sunshine Sketches of a Little Town, aired on CBC Television in 1952–1953; it was the first Canadian broadcast of an English-language dramatic series, as it debuted on the first night that television was broadcast in Toronto. In 2012, a screen adaptation based on Sunshine Sketches of a Little Town was aired on CBC Television to celebrate both the 75th anniversary of the CBC and the 100th anniversary of Leacock's original collection of short stories. The recent screen adaptation featured Gordon Pinsent as a mature Leacock. In the summer of 2018, a live musical theatre adaptation by Craig Cassils and Robin Richardson based on Sunshine Sketches of a Little Town premiered at the Saskatchewan Festival of Words and the RuBarb TheatreFest in Moose Jaw, Saskatchewan.

Canadian stage actor John Stark was most noted for An Evening with Stephen Leacock, a long-running one-man show. An album of his show, released on Tapestry Records in 1982, received a Juno Award nomination for Comedy Album of the Year at the Juno Awards of 1982. Stark also later produced a television film adaptation of Sunshine Sketches of a Little Town, as well as a stage musical based on Leacock's short story "The Great Election".

== Bibliography ==
=== Fiction and humour ===
- Literary Lapses (1910)
- Nonsense Novels (1911)
- Sunshine Sketches of a Little Town (1912)
- Behind the Beyond (1913) – illustrated by Annie Fish.
- Arcadian Adventures with the Idle Rich (1914)
- Moonbeams from the Larger Lunacy (1915)
- Further Foolishness (1916)
- Frenzied Fiction (1918)
- The Hohenzollerns in America (1919)
- Winsome Winnie (1920)
- My Discovery of England (1922)
- College Days (1923)
- Over the Footlights (1923)
- The Garden of Folly (1924)
- Winnowed Wisdom (1926)
- Short Circuits (1928)
- The Iron Man and the Tin Woman (1929)
- Laugh With Leacock (1930)
- The Dry Pickwick (1932)
- Afternoons in Utopia (1932)
- Hellements of Hickonomics in Hiccoughs of Verse Done in Our Social Planning Mill (1936)
- Model Memoirs (1938)
- Stephen Leacock's Laugh Parade: A new collection of the wit and humor of Stephen Leacock (1940)
- My Remarkable Uncle (1942)
- Happy Stories (1943)
- Last Leaves (1945)
- The Leacock Roundabout: A Treasury of the Best Works of Stephen Leacock (1946)
- The Man in Asbestos: An Allegory of the Future

=== Non-fiction ===
- Elements of Political Science (1906)
- Baldwin, Lafontaine, Hincks: Responsible Government (1907)
- Practical Political Economy (1910)
- Adventurers of the Far North (1914)
- The Dawn of Canadian History (1914)
- The Mariner of St. Malo: a chronicle of the voyages of Jacques Cartier (1914)
- Essays and Literary Studies (1916)
- The Unsolved Riddle of Social Justice (1920)
- Mackenzie, Baldwin, Lafontaine, Hincks (1926)
- Economic Prosperity in the British Empire (1930)
- The Economic Prosperity of the British Empire (1931)
- Humour: Its Theory and Technique, with Examples and Samples (1935)
- The Greatest Pages of American Humor (1936)
- Humour and Humanity (1937)
- Here Are My Lectures (1937)
- My Discovery of the West (1937)
- Too Much College (1939)
- Our British Empire (1940)
- Canada: The Foundations of Its Future (1941)
- Our Heritage of Liberty (1942)
- Montreal: Seaport and City (1942)
- Canada and the Sea (1944)
- How to Write (1944)
- While There Is Time (1944)
- My Lost Dollar

==== Biography ====
- Mark Twain (1932)
- Charles Dickens: His Life and Work (1933)

==== Autobiography ====
- The Boy I Left Behind Me (Year-1946)

== Notes ==
- War And Humour
