= The Awful Fate of Melpomenus Jones =

Short story by Stephen Leacock

The Awful Fate of Melpomenus Jones is a short story by Stephen Leacock. It was re-published in Literary Lapses in 1910. It is read by John Le Mesurier on a 1976 LP What Is Going To Become Of Us All?. It was made into a short film by Gerald Potterton in 1983.

It tells the story of a young curate, Melpomenus Jones, who could not bear to say goodbye. He visits some friends and becomes trapped. After a couple of weeks he falls into "raging delirium of fever". After a month, the angels decided his stay was over, and he died.
