= The Truly Exceptional =

Truly Exceptional is a live-action educational series of three short films produced in 1979 by Walt Disney Educational to explain the view point of people with disabilities.

- Carol Johnston, the gymnast Carol Johnston, born missing part of one arm.
- Dan Haley, about a 16-year-old blind boy.
- Tom and Virl Osmond, about two brothers, born deaf, who founded the company Osmond Entertainment.
