= Skills for a New Technology =

1982 Walt Disney educational film series

Skills for a New Technology: What a Kid Needs is an educational series of three live action short films produced in 1982 by Walt Disney Educational films to explain physical fitness.

== 1983 ==
- Skills for a New Technology: What a Kid Needs to Know Today (September 1983):
  - Basic Communication Skills
  - Living With Change guard learns that change can bring benefits
  - Living With Computers guard tells the computer applications
- Computer language is developing
