= A Pumpkin Full of Nonsense =

1985 animated TV special

- VHS release poster
- Also known as: The Adventures of the Scrabble People in A Pumpkin Full of Nonsense
- Genre: Animated special
- Written by: George Atkins
- Directed by: Alvaro Arce; Jaime Diaz
- Starring: Brianne Sidall; Kevin Slattery; Bob Singer; George Atkins
- Theme music composer: Miguel Pizarro; Lyrics: Alvaro Arce; Ada Lobos
- Countries of origin: United States; Argentina
- Original language: English

Production
- Producer: Alvaro Arce
- Running time: 30 minutes
- Production companies: Arce Productions; Jaime Diaz Studios

Original release
- Network: Syndication
- Release: October 31, 1985

The Adventures of the Scrabble People in A Pumpkin Full of Nonsense is an animated television special from 1985, made at Jaime Diaz Studios in Buenos Aires, Argentina. It was produced and directed by Alvaro Arce, and co-directed by Jaime Diaz. In the special, a character called Sir Scrabble and two children travel to a land called Nonsense, where education has been forbidden. Sir Scrabble teams up with the residents to defeat an evil ruler, the Muddler, through the power of learning and spelling.

Selchow and Righter, a U.S. board game manufacturer, financed and developed A Pumpkin Full of Nonsense; it was based on, and also featured, that same company's Scrabble People characters. The special first aired in syndication on October 31, 1985, and was re-run in August 1986. It was released on VHS by Vestron Video through its Children's Video Library label.

== Plot ==
Sir Scrabble, a resident of a magical town known as Nonsense, follows a boy named Tad and a girl named Terry on the way to a Halloween party. Coming across a pumpkin patch, they stumble upon an enormous pumpkin and land right into the town. There, they discover that the signs nearby have missing or scrambled letters. As it turns out, a nemesis called the Muddler—"Baron of Bad Guys, Count of Confusion, Earl of Errors and King of Chaos" as he is dubbed—has rid the land of all education and vowels. This has greatly oppressed the Scrabble People, a group of youngsters who live there.

Sir Scrabble insists on teaching the alphabet to Nonsense's residents, but the Muddler imprisons him for that; this satisfies Rotunda, the evil ruler's daughter. The towndwellers' learning and spelling skills, along with a teacher named Lexa—the area's only literate resident—come to Sir Scrabble's rescue and set him free. They and the human visitors eventually defeat the Muddler, and Nonsense is eventually renamed Makesense. Afterward, Tad, Terry and Mr. Scrabble head over to their party.

== Cast ==
Name	Character	Source
Brianne Sidall	Tad / Terry	
Kevin Slattery	Sir Scrabble	
Bob Singer	Rot	
George Atkins	Muller	
Melissa Freeman	Lexa	
Kathy Hart Freeman	Rotunda	

== Release and reception ==
A Pumpkin Full of Nonsense was produced by Jaime Diaz Studios of Buenos Aires, Argentina, and Arce Productions. The special was financed and developed by Selchow and Righter, the owners of the Scrabble board game at that time. It also showcased, and was based on, the company's Scrabble People property, which was introduced in 1984 and created by the designers of Coleco's Cabbage Patch Kids.

The special originally aired in syndication on October 31, 1985, and was re-run in eleven markets in late August 1986 through Orbis Communications. During that period, it aired on WCBS in New York City. It was released on VHS and Beta on July 16, 1986 by Children's Video Library, a Vestron Video label. C.J. Kettler, a Vestron spokesperson, said that its acquisition of the special "enhances our catalog significantly because all Scrabble People products, including the video, educate children while entertaining them". Eden Ross Lipson of The New York Times called the special an "elaborately produced effort" and added, "It's cartooning for a cause—literacy—and if it falls short as both art and entertainment, it's not for want of trying." A Pumpkin Full of Nonsense was certified with the Seal of Approval from Good Housekeeping magazine.

== See also ==
- Scrabble, a 1980s game show based on the board game
