= PCSFN Fitness Films =

Film series

Fit To Be You was a short-lived live-action educational series originally produced in the early 1980s by Walt Disney Educational that taught children about fitness.

Fit to be You was part of a collaboration by Disney with the President's Council on Sports, Fitness, and Nutrition and BlueCross BlueShield, emphasizing the role of exercise in physical education. Disney produced the films themselves, while PCSFN advised the company and produced a teacher's guide for the series and BCBS purchased the film packages to distribute in schools at no cost. The insurer's participation was part of a larger trend by health companies to lower wellness costs overall by promoting fitness. The films were also available in 16mm.

Aimed at students in seventh though ninth grades, the three 12-minute films in the Fit to be You series each teach a concept in health and physical education. Heart and Lungs details the benefits of exercise on the cardiovascular system. Flexibility and Body Composition teaches dietary concepts like caloric intake and basal metabolic rate, and asks children to consider the nutritional benefits of the foods they currently eat. Muscles explains how the body's muscles and tendons work, teaches about endurance training, and provides a simple exercise program for children including warmups. Each film includes illustrations of the bodily systems involved, as well as footage of exercise programs. They also came with assessments for children to gauge their own nutrition and health habits.

Fit to be You had two counterpart series for different ages: Fun to be Fit, aimed at upper elementary-grade students, and Fitness for Living, designed for older high schoolers. Like Fit to be You, each series came with a teacher's guide.

== Films ==
=== Fun to be Fit ===
- Physical Fitness
- Why Be Physically Fit?
- Getting Physically Fit

=== Fit to be You ===
- Heart and Lungs
- Muscles
- Flexibility and Body Composition

=== Fitness for Living ===
- What is Physical Fitness?
- How to Get Fit
- Measuring Up

== See also ==
- Fitness and Me
