= The Horse with the Flying Tail =

1960 documentary film by Larry Lansburgh

- A scene from the film
- Directed by: Larry Lansburgh
- Written by: Janet Lansburgh
- Produced by: Larry Lansburgh
- Narrated by: George Fenneman
- Edited by: Warren Adams
- Music by: William Lava
- Production company: Walt Disney Productions
- Distributed by: Buena Vista Distribution Co.
- Release date: December 21, 1960
- Running time: 48 minutes
- Country: United States
- Language: English

The Horse with the Flying Tail is a 1960 American documentary film by Walt Disney Productions that won the Best Documentary award at the 33rd Academy Awards. The film is about the palomino horse, Nautical, who won the team gold medal at the 1959 Pan American Games. The film was released theatrically on a double bill with Swiss Family Robinson, and was later broadcast on Walt Disney's Wonderful World of Color in 1964.

The film portrays this horse as having been an undistinguished stock horse, but in fact, he was sired by an American Quarter Horse named Muchacho de Oro out of an Army Remount mare of predominantly Thoroughbred breeding.

This horse's registered name, Pelo de Oro, was given to him at birth. It translates to "Coat of Gold". He became an open jumper and was shown in the national horse show circuit in the United States. Open jumpers compete for scores based on faults (if a jump is refused or a rail knocked down) that are combined with the time elapsed to complete the course. Prior to his Olympic fame, he had a reputation as a temperamental jumper who was inclined to stop unexpectedly at water-and-ditch jumps. Such refusals would disqualify a jumper from an event. His nickname among competitors was "Sneaky Pete" for those reasons and as his distinctive nature became well known, spectators began to identify him by the nickname as well.

He was an excellent jumper (when willing) and he became especially popular because consistently when he cleared a fence, Sneaky Pete would raise his tail in the characteristic fashion shown in the photograph displayed from the film. That uplifted tail, raised so high, was repeated by the horse for each faultless jump and spectators at horse shows relied upon this signal from the horse to record his scores, without waiting for the results from the judges, hence the title of the film about his career.

When he was obtained by Hugh Wiley, Wiley enlisted the help of the United States Equestrian Team coach, Bertalan de Nemethy. Together the two men trained the horse in New Jersey at the Coates estate (the first home of the national equestrian team) on van Beuren Road in Morristown and later, at the facility developed for the team in Gladstone and he became an Olympic-level open jumper. "Sneaky Pete" then became known as "Nautical" and was ridden regularly by members of the United States Equestrian Team in international competitions.

== See also ==
- List of American films of 1960
- List of films about horses
