= The People on Market Street =

The People on Market Street is an educational series of seven short films produced in 1977 to illustrate the basic concepts of microeconomics. The series was produced by the Terry Kahn Organization, written by Arla Sorkin and Terry Kahn, Produced by Terry Kahn, Ilene Kahn, and Arla Sorkin, and directed by Terry Kahn. It is distributed by Walt Disney Educational Media. The series was produced for the Foundation for Economics and Education at the University of California, Los Angeles and is a live action series. The series is unique in that it does not use any charts or diagrams, but rather, human behavior, to illustrate the basic principles of microeconomics. Each episode was scripted and used Screen Actors Guild actors.

== Films ==
=== 1977 ===
- Cost (September 1977), on the organization of a party
- Demand (September 1977), a scene at a petrol station
- Market Clearing Price (September 1977),
- Property Rights and Pollution (September 1977), with the theft of a bicycle
- Scarcity and Planning (September 1977), on the visit of a man and a woman to a clinic
- Supply (September 1977), with an ant farm to demonstrate the influence of supply
- Wages and Production (September 1977), a workshop on school supplies
