= Ama Girls =

1958 film

- Yugoslav poster
- Directed by: Ben Sharpsteen
- Written by: Dwight Hauser
- Produced by: Ben Sharpsteen; Walt Disney
- Distributed by: Buena Vista
- Release date: July 9, 1958
- Running time: 29 minutes
- Country: United States
- Language: English

Ama Girls is a 1958 American short documentary film produced by Ben Sharpsteen. The short was part of Disney's People & Places series and depicts the lives of ama divers, Japanese women who dive for pearls. Ama Girls won an Oscar at the 31st Academy Awards in 1959 for Documentary Short Subject. It is also known as Japan Harvests the Sea.
