= History Alive! =

History Alive was a live-action educational series originally produced in early 1970s by Walt Disney Educational. The series dealt with American history. The main Supervisor of this series was Turnley Walker. Later school textbooks were made with the name history alive. These text books are used to teach world history all around the U.S.

== Films ==
=== 1972 ===
- Democracy - Equality or Privilege? - shows the disagreement between Thomas Jefferson and Alexander Hamilton in the 1790s about the management of a government.
- Impeachment of a President - on the indictment of Andrew Johnson by Thaddeus Stevens.
- The Right of Dissent - on the confrontation between John Adams and Matthew Lyon in 1798.
- The Petition of Right - on John Quincy Adams and Thomas Marshall fight on a bill limiting anti-slavery petitions.
- State's Rights - on the opposition between Andrew Jackson and John Caldwell Calhoun about the tariffs of 1832.
