= Sweet Disaster =

1986 series of short films

Sweet Disaster is a 1986 series of short films, made for Channel 4. It consists of "animated visions of the apocalypse", and includes films such as Babylon and Sweet Disaster. The series was conceived by producer David Hopkins. TheLostContinent explains "Hopkins scripted each of these films aside from the dialogue-free Dreamless Sleep". The films are fairly obscure; Nick Park noted that Babylon "hasn't really seen the light of day for a long time."

== Films ==
=== Babylon (1986) ===
Babylon was one of several Aardman Animations films commissioned by Channel 4 Commissioning Editor Paul Madden. The film was directed by Peter Lord and David Sproxton. The editor is David McCormick. It is included on the Aardman Classics DVD, and so is the least obscure of the series. The short is 15 minutes long. Its release date in the UK was 4 May 1986, and it was later released in Canada on 7 June 2003 at the Worldwide Short Film Festival. Tony Robinson plays the role of Voice of Speaker. The film received two awards: Peter Lord and David Sproxton won the Audience Award, and Peter Lord won the Award of Merit for a Film Between 5 and 15 Minutes. This was the first film project Nick Park worked on after joining Aardman Animations in the mid 80s. Aardman agreed to supply Park with extra resources for A Grand Day Out if he agreed to help them finish the film.

=== Dreamless Sleep (1986) ===
Dreamless Sleep was made by David Anderson. ScreenOnline notes that the film "spent ten wordless minutes subtly conveying a couple's fear in the face of an incoming nuclear blast." The film won the Hiroshima Prize at the 2nd International Animation Festival Hiroshima in 1987. The film had an estimated budget of £125,000. The short was made in Bristol. The title of the short came from David Anderson "going to a carol concert in Bristol with the composer Martin Kiszko and listening to "Oh Little Town of Bethlehem".

=== Paradise Regained (1986) ===
Paradise Regained was directed by Andrew Franks. The film had an estimated budget of £80,000.

=== Conversations by a Californian Swimming Pool (1986) ===
Conversations by a Californian Swimming Pool was directed by Andrew Franks. The film had an estimated budget of £80,000.

=== Death of a Speechwriter (1986) ===
Death of a Speechwriter was directed by David Hopkins. Tony Robinson played The Speechwriter. The film had an estimated budget of £75,000.

== Critical reception ==
Animation World Network described Babylon as "hauntingly powerful", and described Dreamless Sleep as "equally haunting". ScreenOnline cited Dreamless Sleep as an example of how "later work strengthened Anderson's command of his complex technical resources".
