= Fitness and Me =

1984 educational short film series

Fitness and Me is an educational series of three short films produced in 1984 by Sun West Production Inc. for Walt Disney Educational to explain fitness. The series combined live-action and animation. The animation was outsourced to Pantomime Pictures.

- Fitness and Me: How to Exercise - a dragon and a knight are used to show the benefit of a fitness program.
- Fitness and Me: What is Fitness Exercise? - a good Fairy properly explains the facts of physical exercise to a knight.
- Fitness and Me: Why Exercise? - two knights explain to youth the benefits of exercise on their bodies.

== See also ==
- Fit to be You
