= The Tale of the Wonderful Potato =

- DVD Cover
- Directed by: Anders Sørensen
- Written by: Anders Sørensen
- Narrated by: Kai Løvring
- Edited by: Jette Michaelsen
- Release date: February 8, 1986 (Denmark)
- Running time: 22 minutes
- Country: Denmark
- Language: Danish

The Tale of the Wonderful Potato (Danish: Eventyret om den vidunderlige kartoffel) is a 1986 animated film by Anders Sørensen. Sponsored by the Danish Film Institute, it tells the history of the potato through the ages—with a focus on European history and a twinkle in its eye. Potato's humorous and slightly self-deprecating presentation belies the detailed and insightful understanding of human history that carries through from the Incan potato creation myth, to the feisty tuber's heyday in 18th-century haute cuisine.

== Plot ==
The story begins with the myth of how potatoes created the universe and earth. In South America, the potato grows in the image of the "Mother Potato" (sun). The people discover that the potato is edible and they pray to the "Mother Potato". They learn how to cook, farm and store the potato. They also discover gold, and fill their cities with it.

In 1532 the king named Atahualpa and his city was raided by King Charles V's fleet. The Spaniards kill and plunder the city, and they steal all the gold. But the Spaniards chef Carlos, needs food for the trip back to Spain. So they plunder the food storages and discover the potato. The soldiers who eat the potato on the way back, don't get scurvy, because of the high vitamin C levels within the potato. When back in Spain, Carlos tries to get people to use potatoes, but the people are skeptical. Carlos goes around Europe, with the Spanish fleet, trying to spread the potato. But people are still not convinced.

The year 1588 the Spanish fleet tries to conquer England but fails, which leaves Carlos stranded in Ireland. Because of the poverty in Ireland, the potato is accepted by the people. Carlos teaches the Irish how to farm potatoes and dies. The rest of Europe is still skeptical of the potato, but after the 30-year war, the potato has become a vital source of food.

In 1740 Frederick the Great (king of Prussia) spreads the potato even more. A French war prisoner, named Parmentier spreads the potato in France, upon his return. In the Nordic countries they discover that potatoes can be used for making aquavit. In 1804 Napoleon becomes the emperor of France and declares war with the rest of Europe, and potatoes becomes even more vital. When he is defeated in 1815, the potatoes conquered Europe. In 1845, a potato sickness causes a famine in Ireland. But slowly the potatoes build resistance, and again they can be farmed. In the next 100 years they spread all around the world.

== Educational value ==
Inca scene

Irish scene

=== Appropriate audience ===
A mere 24 minutes long, The Tale of the Wonderful Potato is a schoolroom favorite in Europe, and has won the acclaim of teachers' organizations worldwide. It has been translated (dubbed) into Finnish, English, German and Dutch, and it is recommended for grades 5 through 8 due to the versatile nature of its presentation, coupled with a detailed narrative voice.

According to Video Education Australasia this program is suitable for these areas of study:

- History
- Studies of society and environment
- Food technology/Home Economics
- Health

=== Topics ===
Topics covered include:

- History of the potato (from its cultivation by the indigenous peoples in the Andes, the Incas, to Europe)
- Historical figures involved in the history of the potato, such as Atahualpa, Charles V, Francisco Pizarro, Frederick the Great, Antoine-Augustin Parmentier, Louis XVI, Marie Antoinette and Napoleon Bonaparte
- Social climate during the 16th to 18th centuries
- Major Europe events in the 16th to 18th centuries, such as the Spanish conquest of the Inca Empire, the Spanish Armada, the Thirty Years' War and the Great Famine (Ireland)
- Nutrition, storage and preparation of potatoes

== Cast and crew ==
=== Crew ===
- Director: Anders Sørensen
- Writer: Ander Sørensen
- Composer: Anders Koppel
- Cinematographer: Jette Michaelsen
- Editor: Anders Sørensen (uncredited)
- Production Designer: Claus Deleuran
- Sound: Svend Johansen
- Color Artist: Mette Benthien, Vivi Bruus Jensen, Peter Kielland, Jette Michaelsen, Trine Vester, Jonas Wagner, Hanne Wernberg
- Background color: Nanna Ernst
- Animator: Jannik Hastrup, Flemming Jensen, Liller Møller, Per Tønnes Nielsen, Børge Ring
- Inbetween Artist: Vivi Bruus, Jette Michaelsen

=== Cast ===
- Narrator: Kai Løvring

== Influence ==
"Die Geschichte der kleinen Kartoffel"

"Die Geschichte der kleinen Kartoffel" (2023) is an animated short film, based on the Danish animated film "The Story of the Wonderful Potato". Its commissioned by the Swiss potato industry association, Swisspatat (kartoffel.ch), who offers teaching materials on the topic of "potatoes" for schools. The short was directed by Sergio Herencias and produced by David Fritsche. For the development of the visual style, the organizatiom collaborated with illustrator Sarah Vettori, who was responsible for the concept design and illustration of the project.
