= The Wetback Hound =

1957 film

- Directed by: Janet Lansburgh; Larry Lansburgh
- Produced by: Larry Lansburgh; Walt Disney
- Narrated by: Rex Allen
- Distributed by: Buena Vista Film Distribution Co., Inc.
- Release date: June 19, 1957
- Running time: 18 minutes
- Country: United States
- Language: English

The Wetback Hound is a 1957 American live-action short film produced by Walt Disney Productions. It was produced and co-directed by Larry Lansburgh, and it accompanied the theatrical release of the Disney feature Johnny Tremain. In 1958, the film won the Academy Award for Best Live Action Short Film at the 30th Academy Awards.

== See also ==
- List of American films of 1957
