= The Magic of Walt Disney World =

- Theatrical release poster
- Directed by: Tom Leetch
- Written by: Tom Leetch; Bill Bosché (narration)
- Produced by: Ron Miller
- Narrated by: Steve Forrest
- Cinematography: John M. Stevens
- Edited by: Lloyd L. Richardson
- Music by: Buddy Baker
- Production company: Walt Disney Productions
- Distributed by: Buena Vista Distribution
- Release date: December 22, 1972
- Running time: 29 minutes
- Country: United States
- Language: English

The Magic of Walt Disney World is a 1972 documentary featurette produced by Walt Disney Productions.

== Summary ==
Filmed at the then-new Walt Disney World resort in Florida, this film served as a tour of the Magic Kingdom theme park, the resort hotels and other areas within the "Vacation Kingdom". It was narrated by actor Steve Forrest.

== Release ==
The film was released on the same bill as the Disney feature Snowball Express. An expanded and updated version, with new narration by Andrew Duggan, was broadcast as part of The Wonderful World of Disney on March 31, 1974. It was shortlisted for the Academy Award for Best Live Action Short Film.
