= Fergi Series =

Fergi Series was a short-lived live-action educational series originally produced in the 1970s by Walt Disney Productions' educational media division. The series dealt with businesses of prototypes, production, capital, outlay and merchandising. This series also introduced good business vocabulary and clear step-by-step demonstration of the enterprise system at work. Richard Kuller played the title character. At the time of release, it was considered a new way of economical teaching.

== Films ==
=== 1975 ===
- If The Fergi Fits, Wear It
- Fergi Diversifies

=== 1977 ===
- Fergi Goes Inc.

=== 1978 ===
- Fergi Meets The Challenge
