= Ilja Bereznickas =

Lithuanian artist

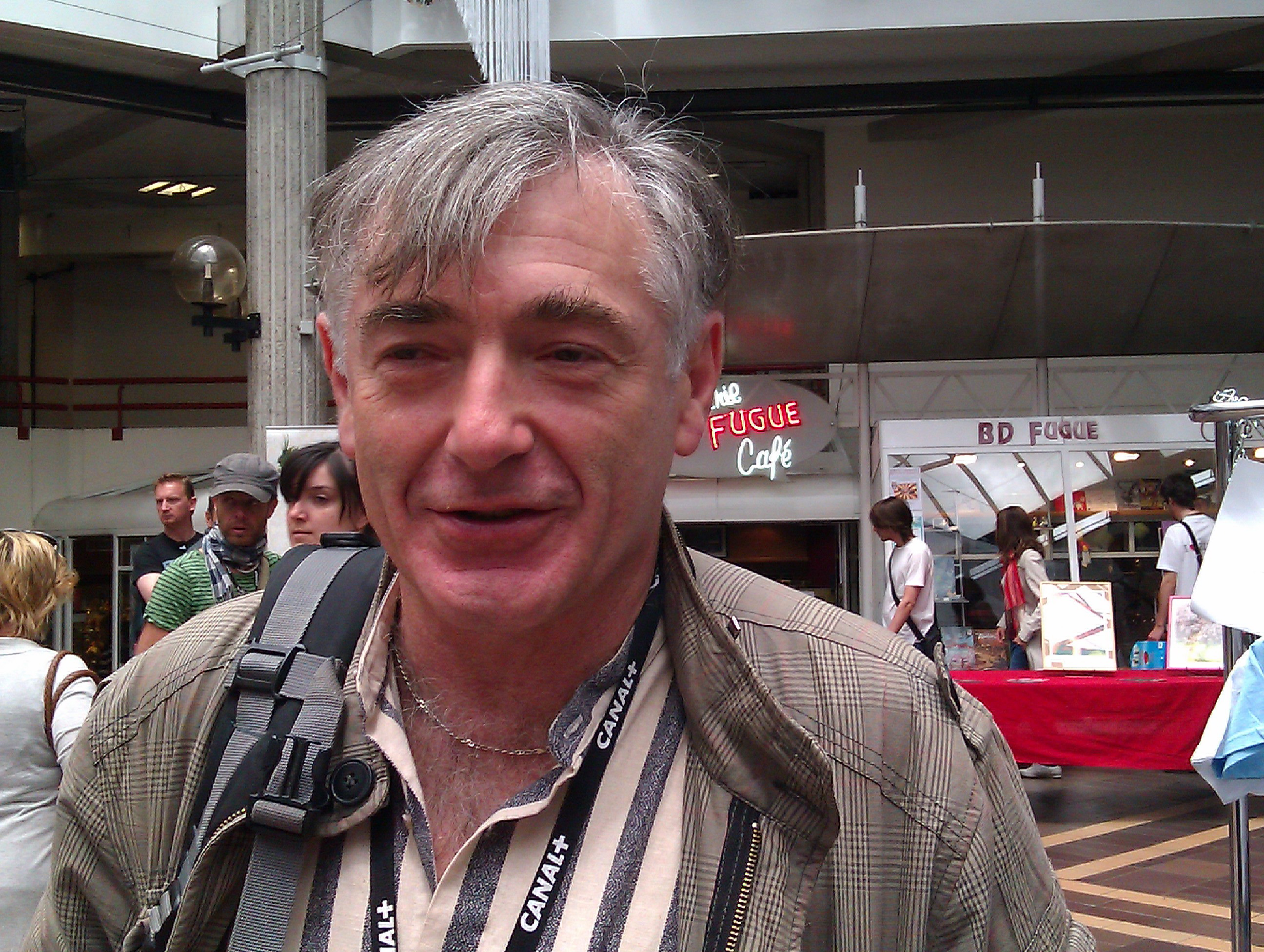
Ilja Bereznickas

Ilja Bereznickas (born January 1, 1948, in Vilnius, Lithuania) is a Lithuanian animator, illustrator, scriptwriter and caricaturist.

== Biography ==
In 1970 he graduated in architecture from Kaunas Polytechnic Institute. In 1985 he graduated from the Postgraduate School of Scriptwriters and Film directors, Moscow, Russia (class of Fyodor Khitruk and Yuri Norstein). Since 1985, with interruptions, he has worked at the National Lithuanian Film Studio - as director, artist and animator. Since 1990 he has worked in Israel, Norway and the U.S. producing and creating animated TV ads, shorts and feature animation films, and illustrating children's books. In 2002 he initiated and became the head of the Animation Programme Vilnius Academy of Art as part of the Photography and Media Art Faculty. In 2003 - 2004 he taught at the School of Visual Arts in New York.

Through his life he created many illustrated books and caricatures. From 1973 onwards he has participated in exhibitions of cartoons worldwide. Individual exhibitions were held in Vilnius (1980, 1997, 2005), and abroad.

== Filmography ==
- Telephone – 1984 (Russia)
- The Last Present – 1985 (Russia)
- Hobgoblin (Lithuanian name "Baubas") – 1987 (Lithuania). Tomar, Portugal, films for children and youth "Mio" Award 1988.
- Bermuda ring – 1988 (Lithuania). Awards: Kiev "KROK" Film Festival in 1989; Bilbao sports film festival prize in 1990.
- Caution, Children – 1990 (Lithuania)
- Newspaper Man – 1991 (Lithuania)
- Our Plasticine Life – 1994 (Lithuania)
- Elephantasia – 1995 (Israel)
- Gurin with the Foxtail – 1998 (feature, Norway) - animation supervisor.
- Grandfather and Grandmother – 1999 (Lithuania)
- Hobgoblin Arithmetic – 2004 (Lithuania)
- No Need to Frighten Us – 2005 (Lithuania)
- Hobgoblin's Illness – 2006 (Lithuania)

== See also ==
- List of Lithuanian painters
