= Larry Lansburgh =

Larry Lansburgh receiving the 1958 Academy Award for Best Live Action Short Subject.

Lawrence Muzzy Lansburgh (May 18, 1911 in San Francisco, California – March 25, 2001 in Eagle Point, Oregon) was an American producer, director, and screenwriter known for his films featuring animals.

== Career ==
Lansburgh's film career began in the early 1930s, when he performed stunts for Cecil B. DeMille–directed films. After he broke his leg falling off a horse, he took a clerical job at Walt Disney Studios. In this position, he hired Bob Broughton.

He subsequently began participating in production as a cameraman, accompanying Walt Disney on Disney's 1941 tour of South America, and contributing to the productions of Three Caballeros, Saludos Amigos, and So Dear to My Heart. In 1969, he wrote and directed the Disney film Hang Your Hat on the Wind., followed by Hacksaw in 1971.

== Recognition ==
Lansburgh's 1956 film Cow Dog was nominated for the Academy Award for Best Live Action Short Subject, Two-Reel. His 1957 Wetback Hound won the 1958 Academy Award for Best Short Subject (Live Action), and his 1960 The Horse with the Flying Tail won the 1961 Academy Award for Best Documentary.

In 1998, he received a Disney Legends award.

Lansburgh's film Dawn Flight was preserved by the Academy Film Archive in 2013.

== Personal life ==
Lansburgh was the son of architect G. Albert Lansburgh.

His first wife, Janet Martin, was originally Disney's publicist.

He was a fervent equestrian, and served as a judge at the American Royal Horse Show, where he met his second wife Olive.

He died on his ranch in Eagle Point, Oregon.
