= List of The New York Times number-one books of 1942 =

Bestselling books of 1942

This is a list of books that topped The New York Times best-seller list in 1942.

Though the bestseller list first began in 1931, it only became a national survey on August 9, 1942; previously the list only reflected sales from the New York metropolitan area.

== Fiction ==
The following list ranks the number-one best-selling fiction books.

The two most popular books that year were The Song of Bernadette, by Franz Werfel, which made the list for fourteen weeks; and The Robe, by Lloyd Douglas, which would reach number one for the final two weeks of 1942 and 34 weeks in 1943.

Date	Book	Author
January 5	The Keys of the Kingdom	A. J. Cronin
January 12	Windswept	Mary Ellen Chase
January 19	Windswept	Mary Ellen Chase
January 26	Windswept	Mary Ellen Chase
February 2	Windswept	Mary Ellen Chase
February 9	Dragon Seed	Pearl S. Buck
February 16	Frenchman's Creek	Daphne du Maurier
February 23	Dragon Seed	Pearl S. Buck
March 2	Dragon Seed	Pearl S. Buck
March 9	Dragon Seed	Pearl S. Buck
March 16	Dragon Seed	Pearl S. Buck
March 23	The Moon Is Down	John Steinbeck
March 30	The Moon Is Down	John Steinbeck
April 6	The Moon Is Down	John Steinbeck
April 13	The Moon Is Down	John Steinbeck
April 20	The Moon Is Down	John Steinbeck
April 27	The Moon Is Down	John Steinbeck
May 4	The Moon Is Down	John Steinbeck
May 11	The Moon Is Down	John Steinbeck
May 18	The Moon Is Down	John Steinbeck
May 25	The Moon Is Down	John Steinbeck
June 1	The Moon Is Down	John Steinbeck
June 8	The Moon Is Down	John Steinbeck
June 15	And Now Tomorrow	Rachel Field
June 22	And Now Tomorrow	Rachel Field
June 29	And Now Tomorrow	Rachel Field
July 6	And Now Tomorrow	Rachel Field
July 13	And Now Tomorrow	Rachel Field
July 20	The Song of Bernadette	Franz Werfel
July 27	The Song of Bernadette	Franz Werfel
August 3	And Now Tomorrow	Rachel Field
August 10	The Song of Bernadette	Franz Werfel
August 17	The Song of Bernadette	Franz Werfel
August 24	The Song of Bernadette	Franz Werfel
August 31	The Song of Bernadette	Franz Werfel
September 7	The Song of Bernadette	Franz Werfel
September 14	The Song of Bernadette	Franz Werfel
September 21	The Song of Bernadette	Franz Werfel
September 28	The Song of Bernadette	Franz Werfel
October 5	The Song of Bernadette	Franz Werfel
October 12	The Song of Bernadette	Franz Werfel
October 19	The Song of Bernadette	Franz Werfel
October 26	The Song of Bernadette	Franz Werfel
November 2	The Prodigal Women	Nancy Hale
November 9	The Prodigal Women	Nancy Hale
November 16	The Prodigal Women	Nancy Hale
November 23	The Valley of Decision	Marcia Davenport
November 30	The Valley of Decision	Marcia Davenport
December 7	The Prodigal Women	Nancy Hale
December 14	The Prodigal Women	Nancy Hale
December 21	The Robe	Lloyd Douglas
December 28	The Robe	Lloyd Douglas

== Nonfiction ==
The following list ranks the number-one best-selling nonfiction books.

Date	Book	Author
January 5	Berlin Diary	William L. Shirer
January 12	Mission to Moscow	Joseph E. Davies
January 19	Mission to Moscow	Joseph E. Davies
January 26	Mission to Moscow	Joseph E. Davies
February 2	Mission to Moscow	Joseph E. Davies
February 9	Mission to Moscow	Joseph E. Davies
February 16	Mission to Moscow	Joseph E. Davies
February 23	Mission to Moscow	Joseph E. Davies
March 2	Mission to Moscow	Joseph E. Davies
March 9	Mission to Moscow	Joseph E. Davies
March 16	Flight to Arras	Antoine de Saint-Exupéry
March 23	The Japanese Enemy	Hugh Byas
March 30	Flight to Arras	Antoine de Saint-Exupéry
April 6	Flight to Arras	Antoine de Saint-Exupéry
April 13	Past Imperfect	Ilka Chase
April 20	Flight to Arras	Antoine de Saint-Exupéry
April 27	Flight to Arras	Antoine de Saint-Exupéry
May 4	Cross Creek	Marjorie Kinnan Rawlings
May 11	The Last Time I Saw Paris	Elliot Paul
May 18	The Last Time I Saw Paris	Elliot Paul
May 25	The Last Time I Saw Paris	Elliot Paul
June 1	The Last Time I Saw Paris	Elliot Paul
June 8	The Last Time I Saw Paris	Elliot Paul
June 15	The Last Time I Saw Paris	Elliot Paul
June 22	The Last Time I Saw Paris	Elliot Paul
June 29	The Last Time I Saw Paris	Elliot Paul
July 6	The Last Time I Saw Paris	Elliot Paul
July 13	The Last Time I Saw Paris	Elliot Paul
July 20	The Last Time I Saw Paris	Elliot Paul
July 27	The Last Time I Saw Paris	Elliot Paul
August 3	The Last Time I Saw Paris	Elliot Paul
August 10	Washington Is Like That	W. M. Kiplinger
August 17	The Last Time I Saw Paris	Elliot Paul
August 24	Victory Through Air Power	Alexander de Seversky
August 31	See Here, Private Hargrove	Marion Hargrove
September 7	The Last Time I Saw Paris	Elliot Paul
September 14	Victory Through Air Power	Alexander de Seversky
September 21	The Coming Battle of Germany	William B. Ziff
September 28	They Were Expendable	William Lindsay White
October 5	They Were Expendable	William Lindsay White
October 12	They Were Expendable	William Lindsay White
October 19	See Here, Private Hargrove	Marion Hargrove
October 26	See Here, Private Hargrove	Marion Hargrove
November 2	See Here, Private Hargrove	Marion Hargrove
November 9	See Here, Private Hargrove	Marion Hargrove
November 16	See Here, Private Hargrove	Marion Hargrove
November 23	See Here, Private Hargrove	Marion Hargrove
November 30	See Here, Private Hargrove	Marion Hargrove
December 7	See Here, Private Hargrove	Marion Hargrove
December 14	See Here, Private Hargrove	Marion Hargrove
December 21	See Here, Private Hargrove	Marion Hargrove
December 28	Our Hearts Were Young and Gay	Cornelia Otis Skinner and Emily Kimbrough

== See also ==
- Publishers Weekly list of bestselling novels in the United States in the 1940s
