= Air supremacy =

Complete control in air warfare

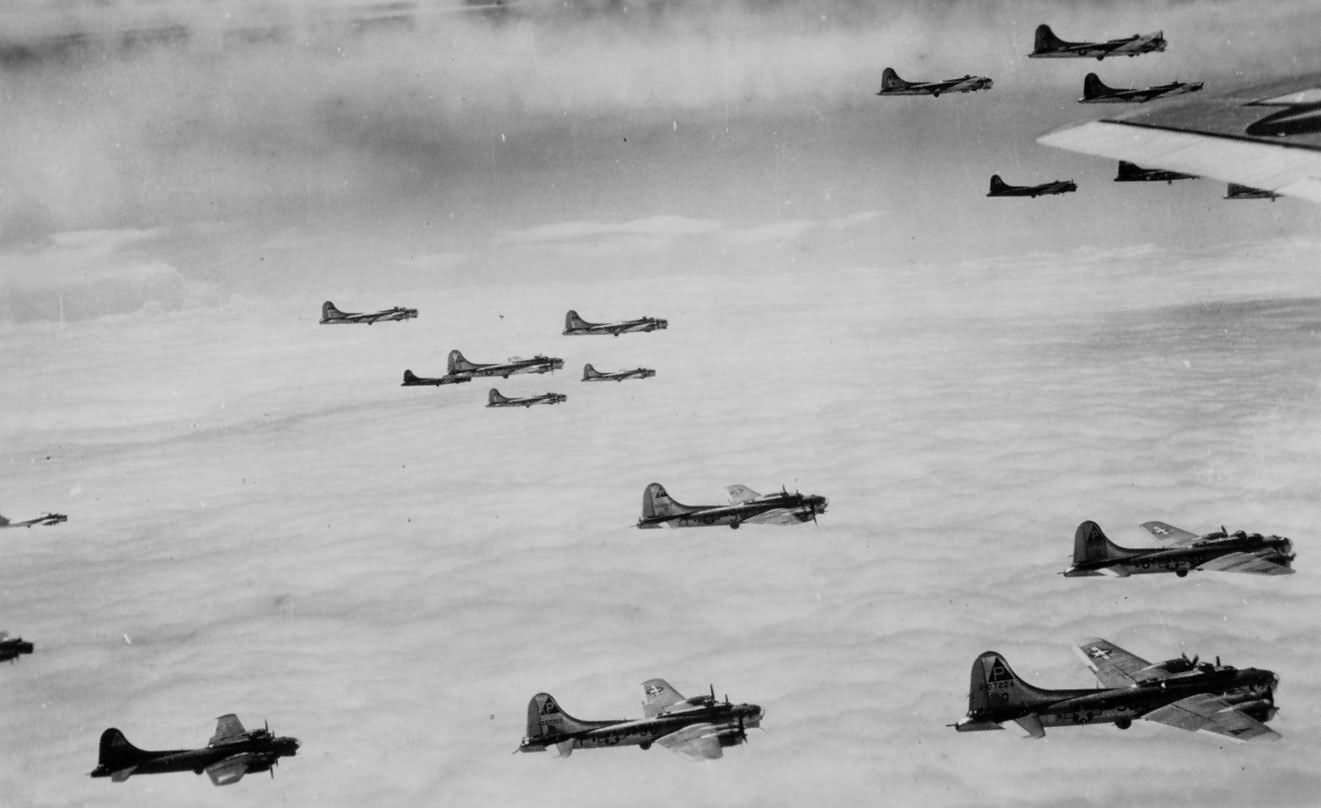
Box formation of B-17 bombers from 384th Bomb Group, 1 September 1944

Air supremacy (as well as air superiority) is the degree to which a side in a conflict holds control of air power over opposing forces. There are levels of control of the air in aerial warfare. Control of the air is the aerial equivalent of command of the sea.

Air power has increasingly become a powerful element of military campaigns; military planners view having an environment of at least air superiority as a necessity. Air supremacy allows increased bombing efforts, tactical air support for ground forces, paratroop assaults, airdrops and simple cargo plane transfers, which can move ground forces and supplies. Air power is a function of the degree of air superiority and numbers or types of aircraft, but it represents a situation that defies black-and-white characterization. The degree of a force's air control is a zero-sum game with its opponent's; increasing control by one corresponds to decreasing control by the other. Air forces unable to contest for air superiority or air parity can strive for air denial, where they maintain an operations level conceding air superiority to the other side, but preventing it from achieving air supremacy.

The achievement of air supremacy does not guarantee a low loss rate of friendly aircraft, as hostile forces are often able to adopt unconventional tactics or identify weaknesses. For example, NATO forces which held air superiority over Kosovo still lost a stealth strike aircraft to a Yugoslav ground-based air defense system, despite it being considered "obsolete". Several engagements have occurred in asymmetrical conflicts in which relatively poorly-equipped ground forces have been able to achieve aircraft kills despite working against overwhelming air supremacy. During both the Iraq War and the War in Afghanistan, insurgents found a greater degree of success in attacking coalition aircraft on the ground than when they were operating above them in the skies.

== Levels ==
Strong force	Weak force
Air supremacy	Air incapability
Air superiority	Air denial
Air parity	Air parity

- Air supremacy is the highest level, where a side holds complete control of the skies. It is defined by NATO and the United States Department of Defense as the "degree of air superiority wherein the opposing air force is incapable of effective interference".
- Air superiority is the second level, where a side is in a more favorable position than the opponent. It is defined in the NATO glossary as the "degree of dominance in [an] air battle ... that permits the conduct of operations by [one side] and its related land, sea and air forces at a given time and place without prohibitive interference by opposing air forces."
- Favorable air situation is defined as "an air situation in which the extent of air effort applied by the enemy air forces is insufficient to prejudice the success of friendly land, sea or air operations."
- Air parity is where no side holds any level of control of skies. This also known as mutual air denial if both parties make it practically or virtually impossible for the opponent to carry out regular aerial operations due to effective anti-air defences on the ground or at sea.

== Methods ==
Although the destruction of enemy aircraft in air-to-air combat is the most obvious aspect of air superiority, it is not the only method of obtaining air superiority. Historically, the most effective method of gaining air superiority is the destruction of enemy aircraft on the ground and the destruction of the means and infrastructure by which an opponent may mount air operations (such as destroying fuel supplies, cratering runways with anti-runway penetration bombs and the sowing of air-fields with area denial weapons). A historical example of this is Operation Focus in which the outnumbered Israeli Air Force dealt a crippling blow to the Egyptian, Jordanian and Syrian Air Forces and airfields at the start of the Six-Day War, achieving Israeli air supremacy.

Disruption can be carried out through ground and air attack. The main role for which the British Special Air Service was formed was to conduct raids on German aircraft and airfields. During operations in the Western Desert the SAS are reckoned to have destroyed more than 400 enemy aircraft. On 6 December 1944, the Imperial Japanese Army Air Force Raiding Group Teishin Shudan destroyed B-29 aircraft on Leyte. During the Cold War, the Soviet Union claimed it could achieve air superiority despite the inferiority of its fighters, by over-running NATO airfields and parking their tanks on the runways, similar to what they have done during Tatsinskaya Raid during the Battle of Stalingrad (note the Germans used parts of their autobahn motorways as airfields during the last war). The Soviet Union planned to use its Spetsnaz special forces in attacks on NATO airfields in the event of conflict.

Attacks by special forces have been seen by some commanders as a way to level the playing field when faced by superior numbers or technology. Given the disparity in effectiveness between their own and South Korean and US fighters, North Korea maintains a large force of infiltration troops; in the event of a war, they would be tasked, among other missions, with attacking coalition airfields with mortar, machine gun and sniper fire. This strategy has been practiced in active conflicts even in recent decades; during the asymmetrical warfare of the War in Afghanistan, 15 fedayeen destroyed or severely damaged eight United States Marine Corps Harrier jump jets in the September 2012 Camp Bastion raid, one result of which being pilots fighting as infantry for the first time in 70 years. Similarly, during the Iraqi War, four Apaches were destroyed on the ground in 2007 by insurgents armed with mortar, which were unintentionally aided by web-published geotagged photographs taken by coalition soldiers.

== History ==
=== First World War ===
The First World War saw many firsts in the field of aerial warfare, including the deployment of aircraft armed with machine guns, the first successful engagement involving synchronisation-gun-armed aircraft on the afternoon of 1 July 1915. Throughout the conflict, air superiority on the Western Front changed hands between the German Empire and the Allies several times. It became recognised that the worst losses was amongst new pilots, many of whom lasted just a day or two. The emergence of specialised fighter units, which were typically led by highly experienced pilots, some of them survivors of the Fokker Scourge period, greatly increased the effectiveness of fighter units.

Early on, the Allies gained a lead over the Germans by introducing machine-gun armed types such as the Vickers F.B.5 Gunbus fighter and the Morane-Saulnier L. In response, Germany bolstered its own aerial development efforts; a major achievement of the era was the Stangensteuerung (push rod controller), a genuine synchronisation gear, developed by the Fokker company. The device was fitted to the most suitable Fokker type, the Fokker M.5K (military designation Fokker A.III), of which A.16/15, assigned to Otto Parschau, became the prototype of the Fokker Eindecker series of fighter designs. This subsequently contributed to a period of German air superiority known as the Fokker Scourge, lasting between late 1915 and early 1916. A briefer period of German aerial dominance occurred in the Bloody April of April 1917; paradoxically, the Germans were disadvantaged on paper during Bloody April in terms of numerical inferiority; their effectiveness was increased by confining themselves to mainly operating over friendly territory, both reducing the possibility of pilots being captured and increasing the amount of time they could stay in the air. Moreover, German pilots could choose when and how they would engage, effectively dictating the terms of combat.

The Italian Corpo Aeronautico Militare established air superiority over the Austro-Hungarian Imperial and Royal Aviation Troops at the Battle of Vittorio Veneto in late October 1918. The Allies operated roughly 600 aircraft (93 Anglo-French, including four RAF squadrons) to gain complete air superiority in this final offensive. The defeat suffered by Austria-Hungary at Vittorio Veneto has been attributed with causing the dissolution of the empire. In turn, the surrender of Germany's primary ally was another major factor in the German Empire's decision that the conflict was no longer viable and needed to end.

=== Interwar period ===
In 1921, Italian aerial warfare theorist Giulio Douhet published The Command of the Air, a book positing that future wars would be decided in the skies. At the time, mainstream military theory did not see air power as a war-winning tactic. Douhet's idea was that air power could be a decisive force and be used to avoid the long and costly War of Attrition. In The War of 19, Douhet theorized that a future war between Germany and France would be settled in a matter of days, as the winner would be the one to gain air supremacy and destroy a few enemy cities with aerial bombs. He speculated that, while the targets would be announced ahead of time and all the population evacuated, but that the event would terrorize citizens into pressuring their government into immediate surrender. At the beginning of the Second World War, Douhet's ideas were dismissed by some, but it became apparent that his theories on the importance of aircraft were supported by events as the war continued.

In 1925, the Royal Air Force (RAF) tested the ability of air supremacy in isolation from other warfare forms during their first independent action in Waziristan. The operation, that later came to be known as Pink's War after Wing Commander Richard Pink in charge, used only air warfare in a combination of air attack and air blockade over 54 days to force militant tribes to surrender. The campaign was successful in defeating the tribes with two deaths for the RAF, but contemporary critics were not entirely convinced of its use in isolation; Commander-in-Chief, India General Sir Claud Jacob stated that "satisfactory ... the results of these operations have been, I am of [the] opinion that a combination of land and air action would have brought about the desired result in a shorter space of time, and next time action has to be taken, I trust that it will be possible to employ the two forces in combination".

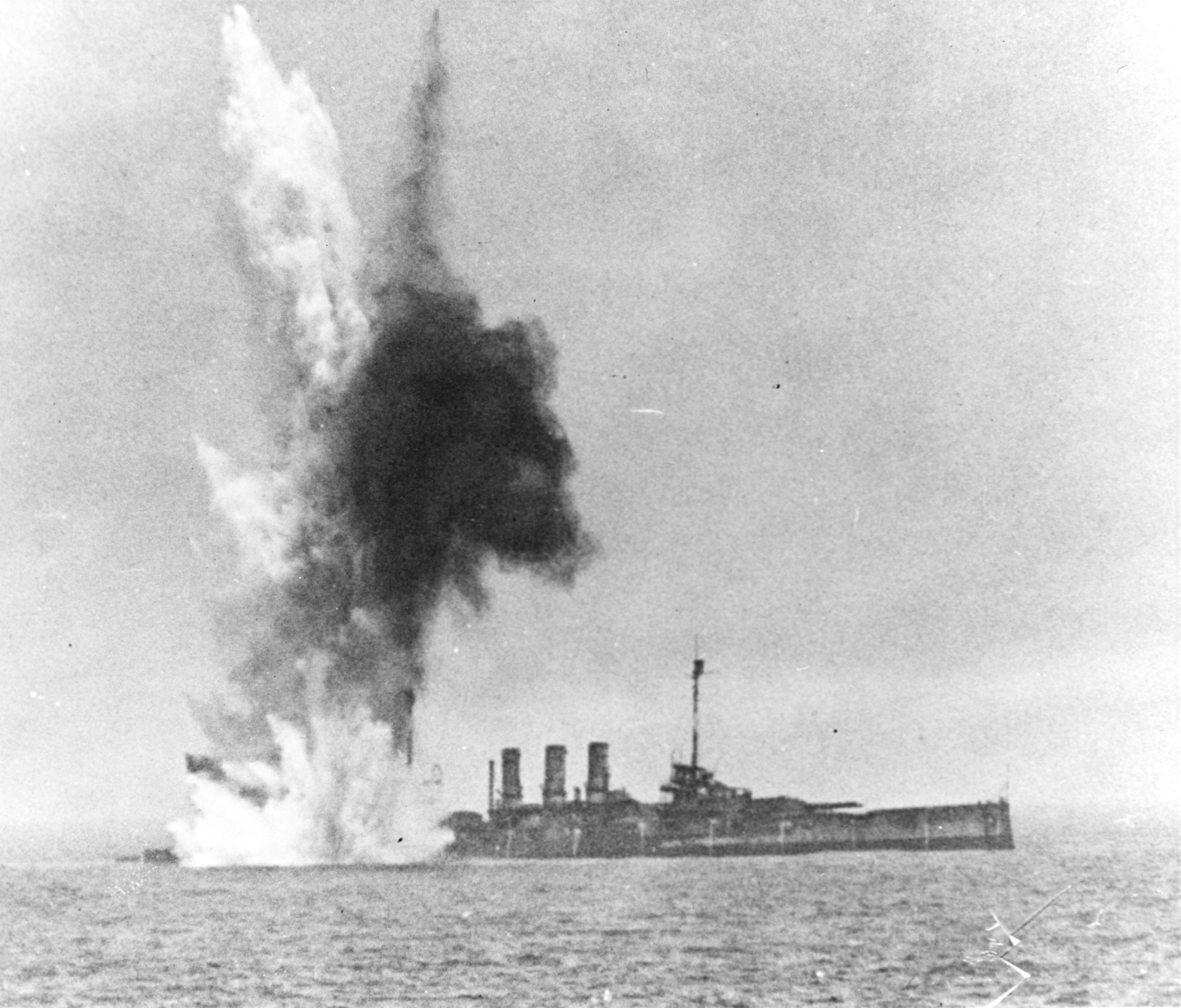
A 2,000 lb (900 kg) bomb "near-miss" severely damages Ostfriesland at the stern hull plates in the Project B demonstration of naval air power.

American general Billy Mitchell was another influential air power theorist of the inter-war period. After the First World War I, then-Assistant Chief of Air Service in the United States Army Air Service under Chief Mason Patrick, Mitchell arranged live fire exercises that proved that aircraft could sink battleships (the largest and most heavily armed class of warships). The first of these was Project B in 1921, in which the captured First World War-era German battleship, SMS Ostfriesland, was sunk by a flight of bombers in 22 minutes.

Mitchell's ideas were not popular, with his outspoken opposition to Army and Navy resistance resulting in a court-martial that precipitated his resignation, but he would prove prescient; his 1924 inspection tour of Hawaii and Asia culminated in a report (published in 1925 as the book Winged Defense) that predicted future war with Japan, including the attack on Pearl Harbor. He would also go on to influence air power advocates such as Russian-American Alexander P. de Seversky, whose 1942 New York Times bestselling book, Victory Through Air Power, was made into a 1943 Walt Disney animated film that opened with a quote from Mitchell; the film is reported to have been influentially shown by Winston Churchill to Franklin D. Roosevelt in support of long-range bombing.

Seeking to influence the outcome of the Spanish Civil War, various international powers tried to influence the conflict via a heavy reliance on air power. The French government provided aircraft to the Republicans covertly, such as the Potez 540 bomber aircraft (nicknamed the "Flying Coffin" by Spanish Republican pilots), Dewoitine aircraft, and Loire 46 fighter aircraft being sent to the Republican forces, along with a group of trained fighter pilots and engineers to aid the Republicans. Also, until 8 September 1936, aircraft could freely pass from France into Spain if they were bought in other countries. The Soviet Union also covertly aided Republicans, between 634 and 806 aircraft were supplied alongside various other armaments. Both Italy and Nazi Germany supplied large numbers of aircraft to the Nationalists while also deploying their own units, such as the Condor Legion and the Aviazione Legionaria, to bolster the Nationalist's forces with their own. While the Soviet aircraft were in current service with their own forces, they proved inferior to those supplied by Germany by the end of the conflict. The use of aircraft, particularly by the Nationalists to continually pressure Republican forces and compel multiple withdrawals during the Aragon Offensive, allegedly informed both the Germans and Soviets of the value of using aircraft to support infantry.

=== Second World War ===
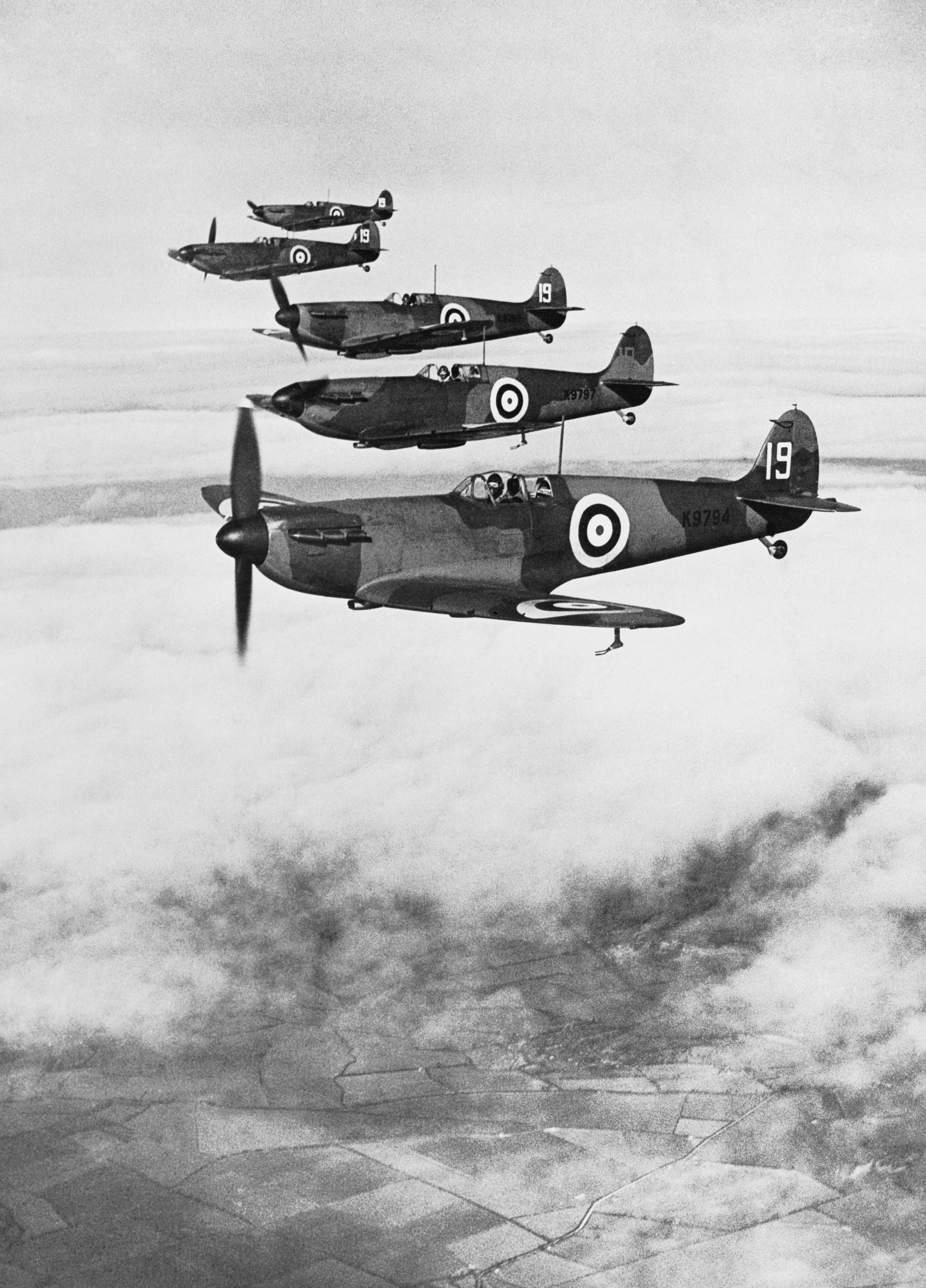
Royal Air Force Supermarine Spitfires before the Battle of Britain

At the beginning of the Second World War, the opposing sides developed different views on the importance of air power. Nazi Germany viewed it as a helpful tool to support the German Army, the approach being dubbed "flying artillery". The Allies saw it, specifically long-range strategic bombing, as being a more important part of warfare which they believed capable of crippling Germany's industrial centers.

After the Battle of France, the Luftwaffe (Germany's air force) achieved air supremacy over Western Europe. The Battle of Britain represented a concerted attempt by Germany to establish air superiority over Great Britain, which it never achieved. Through home-territory advantage and Germany's failure to push home its strategy of targeting Britain's air defenses, Britain was able to establish air superiority over the territory – a superiority that it never lost. It denied the German military air superiority over the English Channel, making a seaborne invasion (planned as Operation Sea Lion) impossible in the face of Britain's naval power. Strategically, the overall situation at home and abroad at the end of the battle might be considered air parity between Britain and Germany. After the air battle, known as the Battle of Britain, the Germans switched to a strategy of night bombing raids, which Britain echoed with raids over Germany.

During Operation Barbarossa, the Luftwaffe initially achieved air supremacy over the Soviet Union. As the war dragged on, the United States joined the fight and the combined Allied air forces gained air superiority and eventually supremacy in the West. (For example, the Luftwaffe mustered 391 aircraft to oppose over 9,000 allied aircraft on D-day.) Russia did the same on the Eastern Front, meaning the Luftwaffe could not effectively interfere with Allied land operations. Achieving total air superiority allowed the Allies to carry out ever-greater strategic bombing raids on Germany's industrial and civilian centers (including the Ruhr and Dresden), and to prosecute the land war successfully on both the Eastern and Western fronts. Following the Big Week attacks in late February 1944, the new 8th Air Force commander Jimmy Doolittle permitted P-51 Mustangs to fly far ahead of the bomber formations instead of closely escorting them starting in March 1944. This commenced in March 1944 and was part of a massive "fighter sweep" tactic to clear German skies of Luftwaffe fighters. Allied planes went after the German fighters wherever they could be found and substantially lowered bomber losses for their side for the rest of the war over Western Europe.

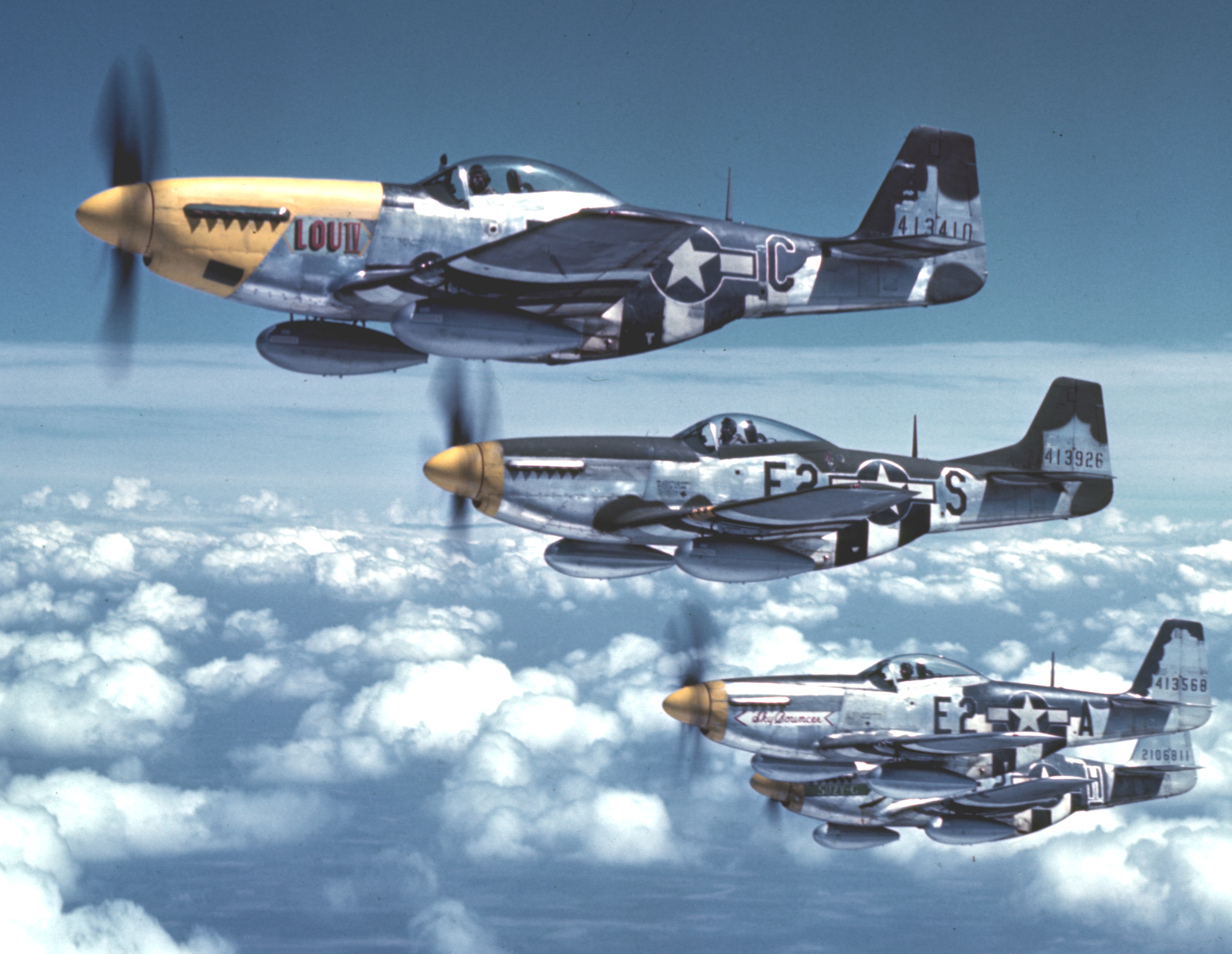
361st Fighter Group P-51D Mustangs of the Eighth Air Force heading out on an air supremacy mission over Nazi Germany

The element of air superiority has been the driving force behind the development of aircraft carriers, which allow aircraft to operate in the absence of designated air bases. For example, the Japanese attack on Pearl Harbor was carried out by aircraft operating from carriers thousands of miles away from the nearest Japanese air base.

Some fighter aircraft specialized in combating other fighters, while interceptors were originally designed to counter bombers. Germany's most important air superiority fighters were the Messerschmitt Bf 109 and Focke-Wulf Fw 190, while the Supermarine Spitfire and Hawker Hurricane were the primary ones on the British side. Performance and range made the P-51 Mustang the outstanding escort fighter which permitted American bombers to operate over Germany during daylight hours. They shot down 5,954 aircraft, more than any other American fighter in Europe. In the Pacific Theater, the A6M Zero gave Japan air superiority for much of the early part of the war, but suffered against newer naval fighters such as the F6F Hellcat and F4U Corsair which exceeded the Zero in performance and durability. The Hellcat shot down 5,168 enemy aircraft (the second highest number), while the land-based Lockheed P-38 was third, shooting down 3,785 in all theaters.

=== Cold War ===
==== Superpower rivalry ====
During the Cold War, between 1946 and 1991, the US, UK, and NATO allies faced the Soviet Union, the Warsaw Pact, and its allies. Both sides engaged in an arms race of improving radar and fighter intercept capability versus the threat of intercontinental strategic bombers carrying nuclear weapons. Initially, high altitude, later combined with high supersonic speeds, was hoped to keep nuclear bombers out of range of fighters and later surface to air missiles, both of which were sometimes equipped with nuclear warheads. In the 1960 U-2 incident an American very high altitude spy plane was shot down over the USSR with a S-75 Dvina (SA-2) long range high altitude surface to air missile largely refuting the concept of high altitude as a refuge for high-performance bomber aircraft. US training changed to low altitude flight of bombers and unpiloted cruise missiles in the hopes of avoiding ground-based air defense radar networks by hiding in with ground clutter and terrain, thwarting attempts at air supremacy over the enemy landmass. Ballistic missiles were also introduced and were very difficult and expensive to intercept even with nuclear-armed defensive missiles.

Airborne early warning and control flying radar aircraft as well as look down shoot down radar in fighter and interceptor aircraft allowed engaging low flying invaders again tipping the balance though this was partly ameliorated by succeeding generations of electronic countermeasures. Ultimately the US led the way in first applying stealth technology to small strike aircraft like the F-117 and stealthy nuclear cruise missiles carried in conventional bombers for standoff release before the air defenses got too thick. The Soviet Union invested heavily in expensive to defeat intermediate and intercontinental range nuclear missiles and less on expensive to maintain patrol bombers, though they had to spend heavily on interceptors and surface to air missiles as well as radar sites to cover the huge landmass of the Soviet Union. The US joined with Canada to organize defense of the area of Alaska, Canada, and the continental United States with North American Aerospace Defense Command or NORAD using both interceptors, some armed with the nuclear AIR-2 Genie, and a surface to air missile component, which was at one point partly nuclearized. Development for the B-2 stealth bomber was intended for, and in anticipation of, a nuclear war and it was the first fully mature stealth aircraft to enter service. The F-22 Advanced Tactical Fighter was a stealth fighter and interceptor aircraft designed during the Cold War as a medium altitude air superiority fighter which was intended to destroy Warsaw Pact aircraft without ever being detected or engaged; both were introduced after the fall of the Soviet Union and the end of the Cold War.

Air superiority in the feared Cold War era WW-III European theater would include fighters intercepting or diverting nuclear and conventionally armed strike aircraft and ground-based air defences, some of which were developed into mobile systems which could accompany and protect armored and mechanized formations. While the Cold War never went hot directly between NATO and Warsaw Pact alliances, the US was engaged in two major limited air wars aiding allies who faced Soviet-supported enemies, with both sides using weaponry designed to fight such a conflict; the Korean and Vietnam wars.

==== Korean War ====
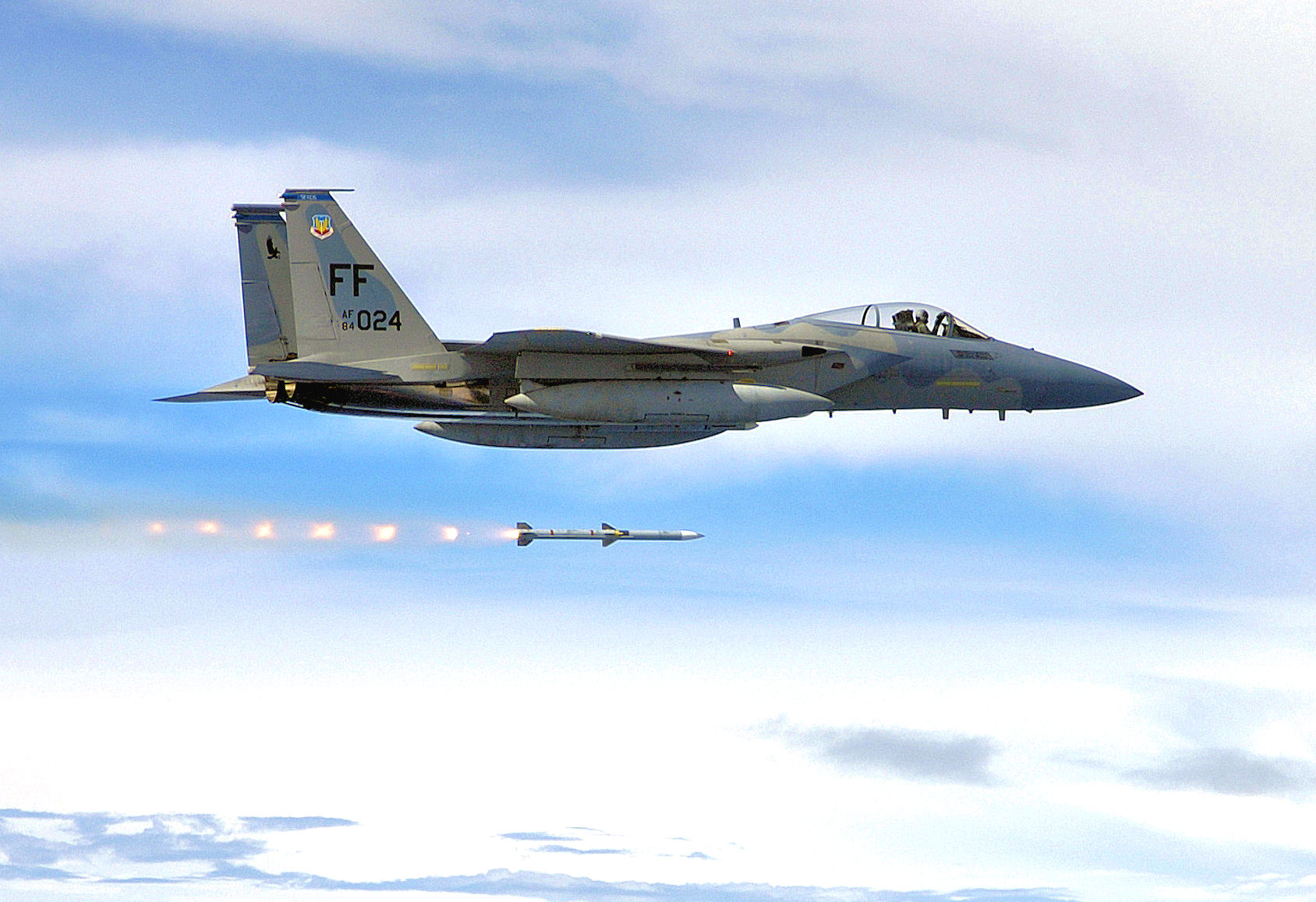
A United States Air Force F-15C Eagle air superiority fighter

The Korean War represented a major turning point for aerial warfare, being the first conflict in which jet aircraft played the central role in combat. Once-formidable fighters such as the P-51 Mustang, F4U Corsair, and Hawker Sea Fury—all piston-engined, propeller-driven, and designed during the Second World War—relinquished their air superiority roles to a new generation of faster, jet-powered fighters arriving in the theater. In the initial months of fighting, the P-80 Shooting Star, F9F Panther, Gloster Meteor and other jets under the UN flag dominated the Korean People's Air Force (KPAF) propeller-driven Soviet Yakovlev Yak-9 and Lavochkin La-9s. By early August 1950, the KPAF was reduced to only about 20 planes.

However, with the Chinese intervention in late October 1950, the KPAF begun receiving the MiG-15, which was one of the world's most advanced jet fighters at that time. Equipped with not only jet propulsion but also a swept wing, the MiG-15 quickly outclassed the straight-wing United Nations fighters. In response, the United States dispatched three squadrons of its own swept-wing fighter, the F-86 Sabre, which arrived in the theatre in December 1950. The Sabre reportedly claimed kill ratios as high as 10 to 1 against the MiGs, allegedly shooting down 792 MiG-15s and 108 other aircraft in exchange for 78 Sabres that were lost to enemy fire. Meanwhile, the Grumman F9F Panther, a straight-wing carrier-based jet, became the mainstay of the USN during the period and had a relatively good showing, possessing a 7:2 kill ratio against the more powerful MiG-15.

==== Vietnam War ====
During the Vietnam War the US side, especially over the north, had restrictive rules of engagement often requiring visual identification nullifying the advantage they would have had using beyond visual range missiles though possibly avoiding friendly fire due to IFF systems not being ubiquitous on US strike aircraft. In the 1950s, the United States Navy tasked the F-8 Crusader, known affectionately as the "Last Gun Fighter" as their close-in air superiority fighter. This role would be taken over by the F-4 Phantom, which was designed as a missile-armed interceptor. The USAF had developed the F-100 and F-104 as air superiority fighters, though by the Vietnam War had already phased out the F-100 from all but ground attack missions. The fast, but slow turning, F-104 allegedly deterred attacks, and despite losses scored no victories in air combat. The USAF replaced it with the Phantom by 1967. Especially under the rules of engagement imposed on them, the heavy and fast Century Series aircraft struggled when engaged in within visual range combat by smaller, more agile Soviet-made VPAF fighters, such as the Mikoyan-Gurevich MiG-17 and MiG-21, the latter of which was formidable against the F-4 and traded range for very high performance. The Century Series was initially designed for intercepting heavy nuclear bombers, or delivering tactical nuclear weapons, and were found to be wanting when engaged over Vietnam. This imbalance lead to the USAF ordering variants of the F-4 with an internal 20mm gun, the USN starting the Top Gun program, and both services sometimes flying with centerline gun pods on earlier Phantoms not equipped with an internal gun. The USN's Top Gun program, combined with significantly better training for weapon handlers onboard the aircraft carrier, resulted in a large increase in the Navy's Phantom capability.

In the 1960s, the limited agility of American fighters in dogfights over Vietnam led to a revival of dedicated air superiority fighters, which led the development of the "Teen Series" F-14, F-15, F-16 and F/A-18. All of them made close-combat manoeuvrability a top priority, and were equipped with guns absent from early Phantoms. The heavy F-14 and F-15A/C were assigned the primary air superiority mission, because of their longer range radars and capability to carry more missiles of longer range than lightweight fighters.

==== Arab–Israeli wars ====
From 1948, when Israel reestablished independence from a protective League of Nations mandatory regime managed by the UK, the neighbouring countries have, to varying degrees, disputed the legitimacy of a Jewish state in a majority Arab region. Some neighbouring states have in the last few decades recognized and signed peace treaties; all have ceased large scale conventional warfare to overrun Israel in large part due to an increasing ability to impose Israeli air supremacy over the region's airspace when required.

===== 1948 war =====
The Israeli Air Force formed in 1948 with the formation of the modern State of Israel. Israel was involved in the 1948 Arab–Israeli War immediately after the end of the British mandate in Palestine. The air force initially consisted of mainly donated civil aircraft, a variety of obsolete and surplus ex-World War II combat-aircraft were quickly sourced by various means to supplement this fleet. Creativity and resourcefulness were the early foundations of Israeli military success in the air, rather than technology which, at the inception of the IAF, was generally inferior to that used by Israel's adversaries. In light of the complete Arab theater air supremacy, and the bombing and shelling of existing airbases, the first Israeli military-grade fighters operated from a hastily constructed makeshift airbase around the current Herzliya Airport, with fighters dispersed between the trees of an orange orchard. As the war progressed, more and more Czechoslovak, American, and British surplus WWII-era aircraft were procured, leading to a shift in the balance of power.

===== 1956 war =====
In 1956, Israel, France, and the United Kingdom occupied the Sinai Peninsula after Egypt closed the Straits of Tiran to Israeli ships, sparking the Suez Crisis. Israel's new French-made Dassault Mystere IV jet fighters provided air cover for the paratroop transport aircraft. The Egyptian tactic was to use their new Soviet-made MiG-15 jets as fighter escorts, while their older jets conducted strikes against Israeli troops and vehicles. In air combat, Israeli aircraft shot down between seven and nine Egyptian jets with the loss of one plane, but Egyptian strikes against the ground forces continued through to 1 November. After several sorties were launched by French and British aircraft, President Gamal Abdel Nasser ordered his pilots to withdraw to bases in Southern Egypt. The Israeli Air Force was then free to strike Egyptian ground forces at will.

===== 1967 war =====
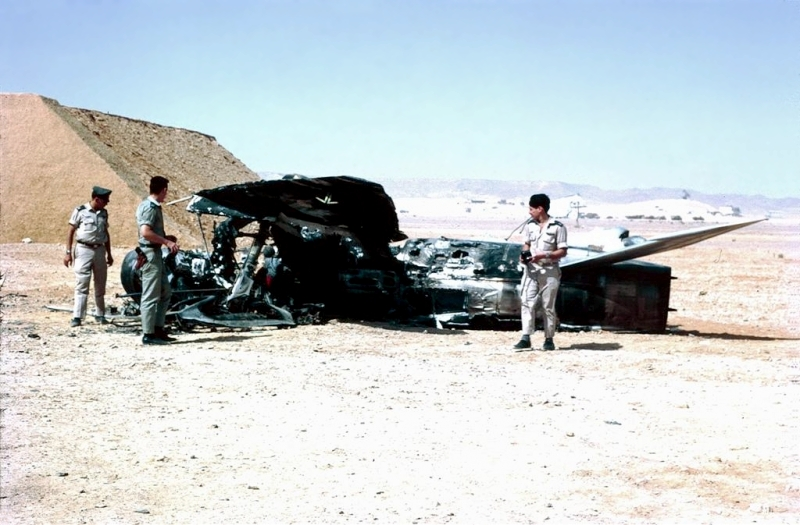
Israeli Air Force officers next to a destroyed Egyptian MiG-21 at Bir Gifgafa

In 1967, the Straits of Tiran were again closed and international peacekeepers were ejected by Egypt. Israel then initiated Operation Focus. Israel sent nearly every capable combat aircraft out against the vastly larger Egyptian Air Force, holding only four for protection. Egyptian airfields were destroyed with anti-runway penetration bombs and the aircraft were mostly destroyed on the ground; Syria and Jordan also had their air forces destroyed when they entered the conflict. This is one of the preeminent examples of a smaller force seizing air supremacy where Israel had complete control of the skies above the entire conflict area.

===== War of Attrition =====
Following the Six-Day War, from 1967 to 1970, there were small scale incursions into the Israeli-held Sinai desert as Egypt rearmed. This evolved into large-scale artillery and air incursions in 1969, with Soviet pilots and SAM crews arriving to assist in January 1970. The strategy was to engage Israeli aircraft in surprise fighter encounters near the Suez Canal where Egyptian SAMs could be used to assist fighters. Syrian, North Korean, and Cuban pilots assisting also suffered losses in this period. In August 1970, a cease-fire was agreed on.

===== 1973 war =====
The first few days of the 1973 Yom Kippur War saw major Arab ground breakthroughs, surprising Israel who, after its lopsided 1967 victory, considered its air supremacy sufficient to blunt or dissuade any conventional attack. Despite Egypt and Syria having rebuilt their air forces since 1967, Israel continued to deny them the airspace over the battle area; however, these Arab forces were able to control losses and shoot down Israeli air support aircraft by employing mobile surface to air weaponry which travelled along with invading units. Most of Israel's air power in the first few days was directed to reinforce the badly mismatched garrison overlooking the besieged Golan Heights which was under attack by Syria. After weakening the Arab SAM cover with airstrikes, commando raids, and armored cavalry, the Arab armored units outran their mobile SAM cover and Israeli aircraft began to take greater control of Egyptian skies, permitting Israeli landings and establishing a beachhead on the west bank of the Suez canal. When Egyptian fighter aircraft were sent into the area of the Israeli bridgehead, SAM sites were offlined which allowed Israeli air power to more safely engage and destroy many Egyptian fighters though taking some losses.

===== 1978 Lebanon conflict =====
The 1978 South Lebanon conflict was an invasion of Lebanon up to the Litani River, carried out by the Israel Defense Forces in 1978 in response to the Coastal Road massacre. Israel had complete air supremacy.

===== 1982 Lebanon invasion =====
In the 1982 Lebanon War where Israel invaded up to Beirut, Syria intervened on the side of Lebanon and the PLO forces residing there. Israeli jets shot down between 82 and 86 Syrian aircraft in aerial combat, without losses. A single Israeli A-4 Skyhawk and two helicopters were shot down by anti-aircraft fire and SAM missiles. This was the largest aerial combat battle of the jet age with over 150 fighters from both sides engaged. Syrian claims of aerial victories were met with skepticism even from their Soviet allies. The Soviets were so shaken by the staggering losses sustained by their allies that they dispatched the deputy head of their air defense force to Syria to examine how the Israelis had been so dominant.

The Israelis have upheld substantial air superiority for most of this time with Israel able to operate almost unopposed; Israel held near air supremacy against targets anywhere within range in the Middle East and North Africa until today. Regarding aircraft procurement, Israel started with British and French designs, then transitioning to indigenous production and then also design before moving again to purchasing to American designs. The Arabs directly participating in these battles against Israel except for Jordan and, to some extent, Iraq have commonly used Soviet designs.

==== Falklands War ====
In the Falklands War (2 April–20 June 1982), the British deployed Harrier jets as air superiority fighters against Argentina's Mach-capable Dassault Mirage IIIEA fighters and subsonic Douglas A-4 Skyhawk jets. Despite the Sea Harrier's numerical and performance disadvantages, the British Harrier force suffered no air-to-air losses for over twenty Argentine aircraft shot down in aerial combat. Argentine airpower targeted Royal Navy ships during the landings at San Carlos Bay, numerous British vessels were lost or moderately damaged. However, many British ships escaped being sunk due to the Argentine pilots releasing their bombs at very low altitude, and hence those bomb fuzes did not have sufficient time to arm before impact and thus many never exploded. The pilots would have been aware of this—but released at such low altitudes due to the high concentration of British SAMs, Anti-Aircraft Artillery (AAA), and Sea Harriers, many failed to climb to the necessary release point. The Argentine forces solved the problem by fitting improvised retarding devices, allowing the pilots to effectively employ low-level bombing attacks on 8 June.

==== Gulf War ====
The Iraqi Air Force suffered almost complete obliteration in the opening stages of the Persian Gulf War (2 August 1990 – 28 February 1991). It lost most of its aircraft, as well as command-and-control capability, to precise Coalition strikes or when Iraqi personnel flew their aircraft to Iran. Iraqi Anti-aircraft defenses, including shoulder-launched surface-to-air missiles, were surprisingly ineffective against coalition aircraft, suffering only 75 aircraft losses in over 100,000 sorties, of which 42 of these were the result of Iraqi action while the other 33 were reportedly lost to accidents. In particular, RAF and US Navy aircraft which flew at low altitudes to avoid radar were particularly vulnerable, though this changed when the aircrews were ordered to fly above the AAA.

=== Post Cold War ===
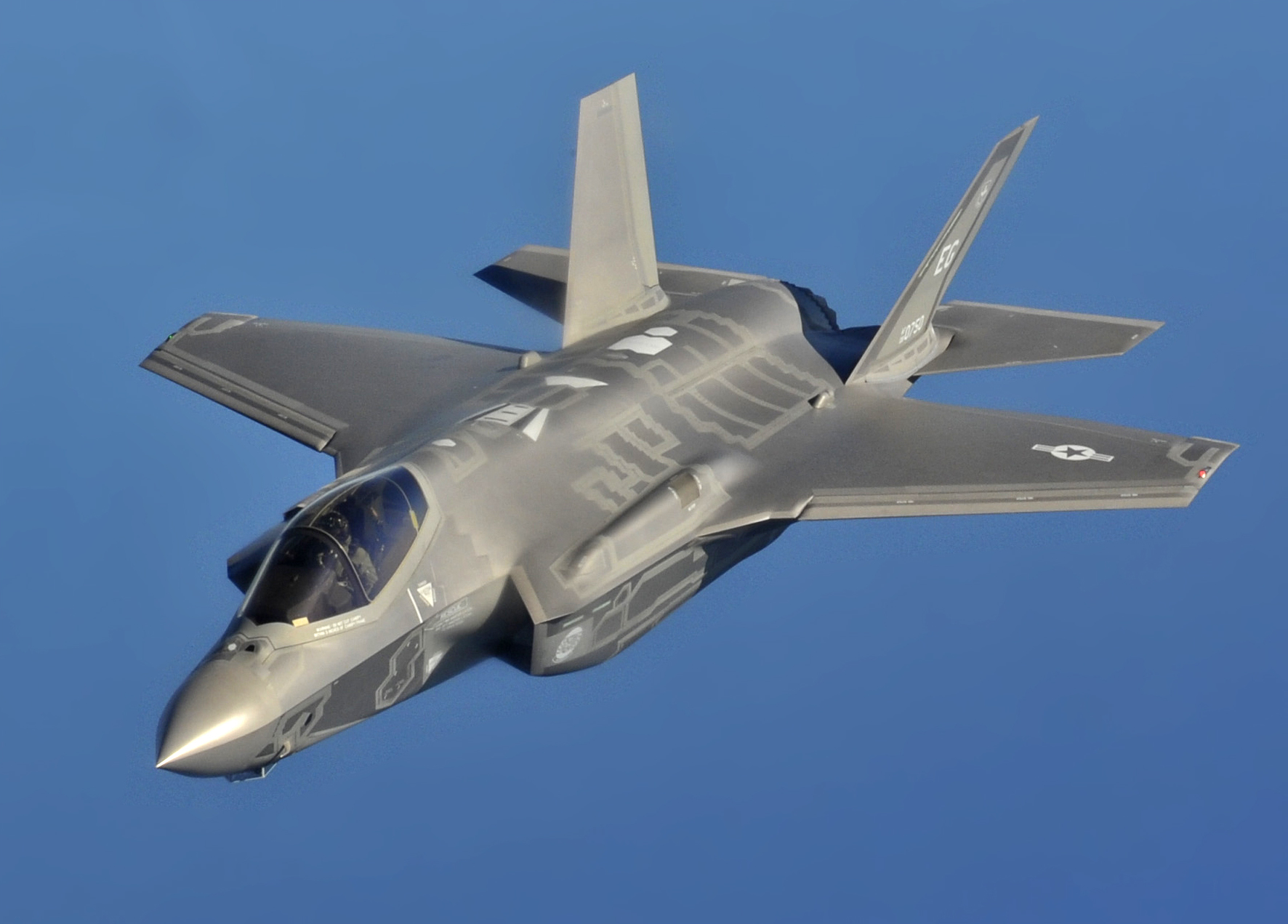
A United States Air Force F-35A Lightning II stealth fighter

During the 1980s, the United States commenced work on a new fighter capable of gaining air superiority without being detected by an opposing force, approving the Advanced Tactical Fighter program to develop a replacement for the United States Air Force's (USAF) aging F-15 fleet. The YF-23 and the YF-22 were chosen as the finalists in the competition. During 2005, the F-22 Raptor, the subsequent result of the program, became operational. USAF officials have promoted the F-22 as being a critical component of the service's tactical air power. Its combination of stealth, aerodynamic performance, and avionics systems is said to enable unprecedented air combat capabilities.

Anthony Cordesman wrote of NATO's theater air supremacy during its 1999 intervention in the Kosovo War of 1998–1999. According to several reports, including reports by the Carnegie Endowment for International Peace and Bulletin of the Atomic Scientists that quote Russian sources, the Russian Federation has in recent decades formulated explicit strategies for using tactical nuclear weapons. These new strategies have in part resulted from the assumption of obtaining air supremacy and use by the US Air Force of precision munitions with little collateral damage in the Kosovo conflict in what amounted to quick mass destruction of military assets once only possible with nuclear weapons or massive bombing against fellow Slavic Serbians; it also assumed that Russia and its allies do not have the strategic economic capacity of current NATO and allied nations to meet this threat with conventional weapons. In response Vladimir Putin, then secretary of the Security Council of Russia, developed a concept of using both tactical and strategic nuclear threats and strikes to de-escalate or cause an enemy to disengage from a conventional conflict threatening what Russia considered a strategic interest. This concept was formalized when Putin took power in Russia in the following year.

Throughout the Syrian Civil War of the 2010s, Israel was reportedly able to hold a general stance of air superiority over the Syrian forces, enabling offensive operations with relative impunity. However, this was challenged during 2018 by the deployment of a Russian-supplied S-400 missile battery to the Syrian theatre. During the February 2018 Israel–Syria incident, despite the loss of an aircraft, Israel has demonstrated their capability to operate without effective interference within the Syrian theater. On 22 May 2018, Israeli Air Force chief Amikam Norkin said that the service had employed their F-35Is in two attacks on two battle fronts, marking the first combat operation of an F-35 by any country.

==== 2025 India Pakistan Air War ====
May 2025 saw the largest aerial battles after Second World War between India and Pakistan when India launched Operation Sindoor to target terrorist camps inside Pakistan. Operation started on 7 May when India struck terror camps at Muridke and Bahawalpur. Pakistan retaliated by shooting down two or three Indian jets inside Indian airspace. The losses were attributed to a combination of factors: Indian rules of engagement that prevented SEAD and attacks on Pakistani aircraft, faulty intelligence regarding the range of Pakistan PL-15 air-to-air missile as well as advanced tactics used by Pakistan which Indians were not anticipating.

Many analysts characterized this air battle of 7 May as a Pakistani victory as despite hitting terrorist camps successfully India took losses in the air. Pakistan, however, was unable to capitalize on this outcome as three large scale attacks by the Pakistan Air Force of up to 1000 drones and missiles each were defeated by Indian air defences. Pakistan used Yiha drones, CM-400AKG, Fatah rockets as well as Hatf missiles to target India.

On the night of 9–10 May, the Indian Air Force launched a large-scale drone offensive targeting Pakistani air surveillance infrastructure. Using Harop and Harpy loitering munitions, India reportedly destroyed up to 12 radar installations and air defence sites. A subsequent ambush against a Pakistani Airborne early warning and control aircraft at a distance of nearly 300 kilometers further degraded Pakistan’s situational awareness. Following these strikes, Pakistan experienced a significant loss of air surveillance capability.

Indian Air Force then initiated large-scale airstrikes against Pakistani airfields destroying command and control centres, aircraft hangars, UAV hangars, and surface-to-air missile sites. India also cratered the runways at two airbases. Most of these strikes were later confirmed. The most significant among these strikes was the BrahMos strike on Nur Khan Airbase near Islamabad, which is about a mile away from the Pakistani Strategic Plans Division, which oversees the Pakistani nuclear arsenal. By morning of 10 May the Indian Air Force had gained air superiority over a large part of Pakistani airspace.

Pakistan then called a meeting of its National Command Authority on the morning of 10 May. This meeting, along with the strike on Nur Khan Airbase, alarmed the United States, prompting it to intervene, having previously maintained a limited role in the conflict. A ceasefire was finally agreed between the countries. Both countries ceased fire after 5 pm on 10 May.

==== 2026 Iran war ====
During the 2026 Iran war, the United States and Israel claimed they were close to achieving air supremacy over Iran. On 31 March 2026, Pete Hegseth as Secretary of Defense announced the U.S. began flying B-52 bombers over Iranian territory for the first time, as an indication of the U.S.'s confidence of air supremacy.

== See also ==
- Air superiority fighter
- Battleplan (documentary TV series)
- Command of the sea
- Defense Technical Information Center
- No-fly zone
- Overmatch
- Suppression of Enemy Air Defenses
- Technological supremacy
- Victory Through Air Power and its film
