= The Skipper Surprised His Wife =

1950 film by Elliott Nugent

- Theatrical release poster
- Directed by: Elliott Nugent
- Written by: Dorothy Kingsley
- Based on: I Taught My Wife to Keep House the Navy Way" and "The Skipper Surprised His Wife; 1949 Reader's Digest by William Lederer
- Produced by: William H. Wright
- Starring: Robert Walker; Joan Leslie; Edward Arnold
- Cinematography: Harold Lipstein
- Edited by: Cotton Warburton
- Music by: Bronislau Kaper
- Production company: Metro-Goldwyn-Mayer
- Distributed by: Metro-Goldwyn-Mayer
- Release date: June 29, 1950
- Running time: 85 minutes
- Country: United States
- Language: English
- Budget: $753,000
- Box office: $926,000

The Skipper Surprised His Wife is a 1950 American comedy film directed by Elliott Nugent and starring Robert Walker, Joan Leslie and Edward Arnold.

== Plot ==
The skipper, Cmdr. William Lattimer (Robert Walker) whose wife Daphne (Joan Leslie) is incapacitated by a broken leg, forcing the skipper takes over management of their home. A stickler for nautical discipline, Lattimer tries to run things "the Navy way," but this proves not only futile but ridiculous.

== Cast ==
- Robert Walker as Cmdr. William J. Lattimer
- Joan Leslie as Daphne Lattimer
- Edward Arnold as Adm. Homer Thorndyke
- Spring Byington as Agnes Thorndyke
- Leon Ames as Dr. Phillip Abbott
- Jan Sterling as Rita Rossini
- Anthony Ross as Joe Rossini
- Paul Harvey as Brendon Boyd
- Kathryn Card as Thelma Boyd
- Tommy Myers as Tommy Lattimer
- Rudy Lee as Davey Lattimer
- Finnegan Weatherwax as Muscles

== Reception ==
According to MGM records, the film earned $733,000 in the US and Canada and $193,000 overseas, leading to a loss of $181,000.
