= Marion Hargrove =

American novelist, film and television scriptwriter

Edward Thomas Marion Lawton Hargrove Jr. (October 13, 1919 – August 23, 2003) was an American writer.

== Early years ==
Hargrove was born in Mount Olive, North Carolina. He worked on the newspaper at his Charlotte, North Carolina, high school and worked part-time at The Charlotte News while he was in high school. He attended Belmont Abbey College and was the feature editor of The Charlotte News before he went into the Army, where he worked on the staff of Yank, the Army Weekly.

== Career ==
Hargrove is noted for the bestselling book See Here, Private Hargrove, a collection of humorous newspaper columns written mostly before the United States entered World War II. (The book was made into a 1944 movie with Robert Walker as Hargrove and Donna Reed as his love interest.) During the war, he served on the staff of Yank, the Army Weekly. After the war, Hargrove wrote two novels: Something's Got to Give (1948) and The Girl He Left Behind (1956), which was made into a motion picture in 1956, starring Tab Hunter and Natalie Wood. He also wrote for various popular magazines, and served as feature editor of Argosy.

Hargrove settled in Los Angeles in 1955 and began writing television and film scripts. His credits include Bert D'Angelo/Superstar, Cash McCall (1960) starring James Garner, The Music Man (1962) with Robert Preston, and television episodes of Maverick (1957) with James Garner, The Restless Gun (1957) starring John Payne, Colt .45 (1957), Zane Grey Theater (1957), the pilot script for 77 Sunset Strip titled Girl on the Run (1958) with Efrem Zimbalist Jr., The Rogues (1964) with David Niven, Charles Boyer and Gig Young, I Spy (1966) with Robert Culp and Bill Cosby, The Name of the Game (1969) with Tony Franciosa, Gene Barry and Robert Stack, Nichols (1972) with James Garner, The Brothers O'Toole (1973), The Waltons (1975), and Bret Maverick (1981) with James Garner. Collaborator Roy Huggins discusses Hargrove at length in part 6 of his video interview with the Archive of American Television. Hargrove was one of three Hollywood writers interviewed and analyzed at length in Prime Time Authorship (2002), by Douglas Heil. While working at Warner Bros. in 1959, he was the center of a successful grass-roots letter-writing campaign to acquire a suitable couch for his office on the studio lot. A selection of these letters was published in Playboy Magazine under the title "Hollywood Horizontal" (1959) and anthologized in The Playboy Book of Humor and Satire (1965).

In 1965, Hargrove attempted to mold a television series after See Here, Private Hargrove, with Peter Helm in the starring role. The pilot was produced but never sold.

== Personal life and death ==
Hargrove married Alison Pfeiffer on December 1, 1942. They had three children and were divorced on May 11, 1950. He and his second wife, Robin, had three children. He also had a stepdaughter. Hargrove died from complications of pneumonia in Long Beach, California, on August 23, 2003, aged 83.

== See also ==
- What Next, Corporal Hargrove?
