= The Sailor Takes a Wife =

1946 film by Richard Whorf

- Theatrical release poster
- Directed by: Richard Whorf
- Written by: Anne Morrison Chapin; Whitfield Cook
- Based on: play Happily Ever After by Chester Erskine
- Produced by: Edwin H. Knopf
- Starring: Robert Walker; June Allyson
- Cinematography: Sidney Wagner
- Edited by: Irvine Warburton
- Music by: Johnny Green
- Distributed by: Metro-Goldwyn-Mayer
- Release dates: February 28, 1946 (New York City, premiere)
- Country: United States
- Language: English
- Budget: $1,012,000
- Box office: $2,559,000

The Sailor Takes a Wife is a 1946 American romantic comedy film directed by Richard Whorf and starring Robert Walker and June Allyson.

== Plot ==
During World War II, a sailor in New York City who is about to be shipped out to Europe marries a woman he has just met. Then he unexpectedly receives a medical discharge.

== Cast ==
- Robert Walker as John Hill
- June Allyson as Mary Hill
- Hume Cronyn as Freddie Potts
- Audrey Totter as Lisa Borescu
- Eddie "Rochester" Anderson as Harry
- Reginald Owen as Mr. Amboy
- Gerald Oliver Smith as Gerald

== Reception ==
According to MGM records, the film earned $2,269,000 in the US and Canada and $290,000 elsewhere, making a profit of $683,000.
