= What Next, Corporal Hargrove? =

1945 film by Richard Thorpe

- Theatrical release poster
- Directed by: Richard Thorpe
- Screenplay by: Harry Kurnitz
- Based on: See Here, Private Hargrove; 1942 novel by Marion Hargrove
- Produced by: George Haight
- Starring: Robert Walker; Keenan Wynn; Jean Porter
- Cinematography: Henry Sharp
- Edited by: Albert Akst
- Music by: David Snell
- Distributed by: Metro-Goldwyn-Mayer
- Release date: November 21, 1945
- Running time: 95 minutes
- Country: United States
- Language: English
- Box office: $2,250,000 (US rentals)

What Next, Corporal Hargrove? is a 1945 black-and-white comedy film directed by Richard Thorpe and starring Robert Walker and Keenan Wynn. It was distributed by MGM and produced by George Haight. Harry Kurnitz received an Oscar nomination for his original screenplay, What Next, Corporal Hargrove?, for this follow-up to the 1944 hit See Here, Private Hargrove.

== Plot ==
U.S. artillery corporal Marion Hargrove finds himself at large in wartime France with wheeler-dealer pal Pvt. Thomas Mulvehill. Inadvertently detached from their outfit, Hargrove and Mulvehill wander into a French village, where they're lauded as conquering heroes by the populace.

== Cast ==
- Robert Walker as Cpl. Marion Hargrove
- Keenan Wynn as Pvt. Thomas Mulvehill
- Jean Porter as Jeanne Quidoc
- Chill Wills as Sgt. Cramp
- Hugo Haas as Mayor Quidoc
- William 'Bill' Phillips as Bill Burk
- Fred Essler as Marcel Vivin
- Cameron Mitchell as Joe Lupot
- Ted Lundigan as Curtis
- Dick Hirbe as Neilson
- Arthur Walsh as Ellerton
- Maurice Marks as Gilly
- Paul Langton as Capt. Drake
- James Davis as Sgt. Hill
- Jack Carlyle as Lt. Morley
