= See Here, Private Hargrove (film) =

1944 film by Wesley Ruggles

- Directed by: Wesley Ruggles
- Screenplay by: Harry Kurnitz
- Based on: See Here, Private Hargrove; 1942 book by Marion Hargrove
- Produced by: George Haight
- Starring: Robert Walker; Donna Reed; Keenan Wynn
- Cinematography: Charles Lawton Jr.
- Edited by: Frank E. Hull
- Music by: David Snell; Lennie Hayton
- Distributed by: Metro-Goldwyn-Mayer
- Release date: March 18, 1944
- Running time: 101 minutes
- Country: United States
- Language: English

See Here, Private Hargrove is a 1944 American black-and-white comedy film from MGM, produced by George Haight, directed by Wesley Ruggles, and starring Robert Walker, Donna Reed, and Keenan Wynn. The film was adapted from the 1942 memoir of the same name by Marion Hargrove.

The film was followed by a 1945 sequel, What Next, Corporal Hargrove?, which followed Hargrove to France.

== Plot ==
The storyline unfolds as a series of humorous anecdotes about Marion Hargrove's tenure in the U.S. Army while at boot camp in Fort Bragg, NC during the early days of World War II.

== Cast ==
- Robert Walker as Pvt. Marion Hargrove
- Donna Reed as Carol Holliday
- Keenan Wynn as Pvt. Mulvehill
- Grant Mitchell as Uncle George
- Ray Collins as Brody S. Griffith
- Chill Wills as First Sgt. Cramp
- Bob Crosby as Bob
- Marta Linden as Mrs. Holliday
- George Offerman Jr. as Pvt. Orrin Esty
- Edward Fielding as Gen. Dillon
- Donald Curtis as Sgt. Heldon
- William Phillips as Pvt. Bill Burk (as Wm. 'Bill' Phillips)
- Douglas Fowley as Capt. R.S. Manville
- Robert Benchley as Mr. Holliday
