= The Clock (1945 film) =

1945 film by Vincente Minnelli, Fred Zinnemann

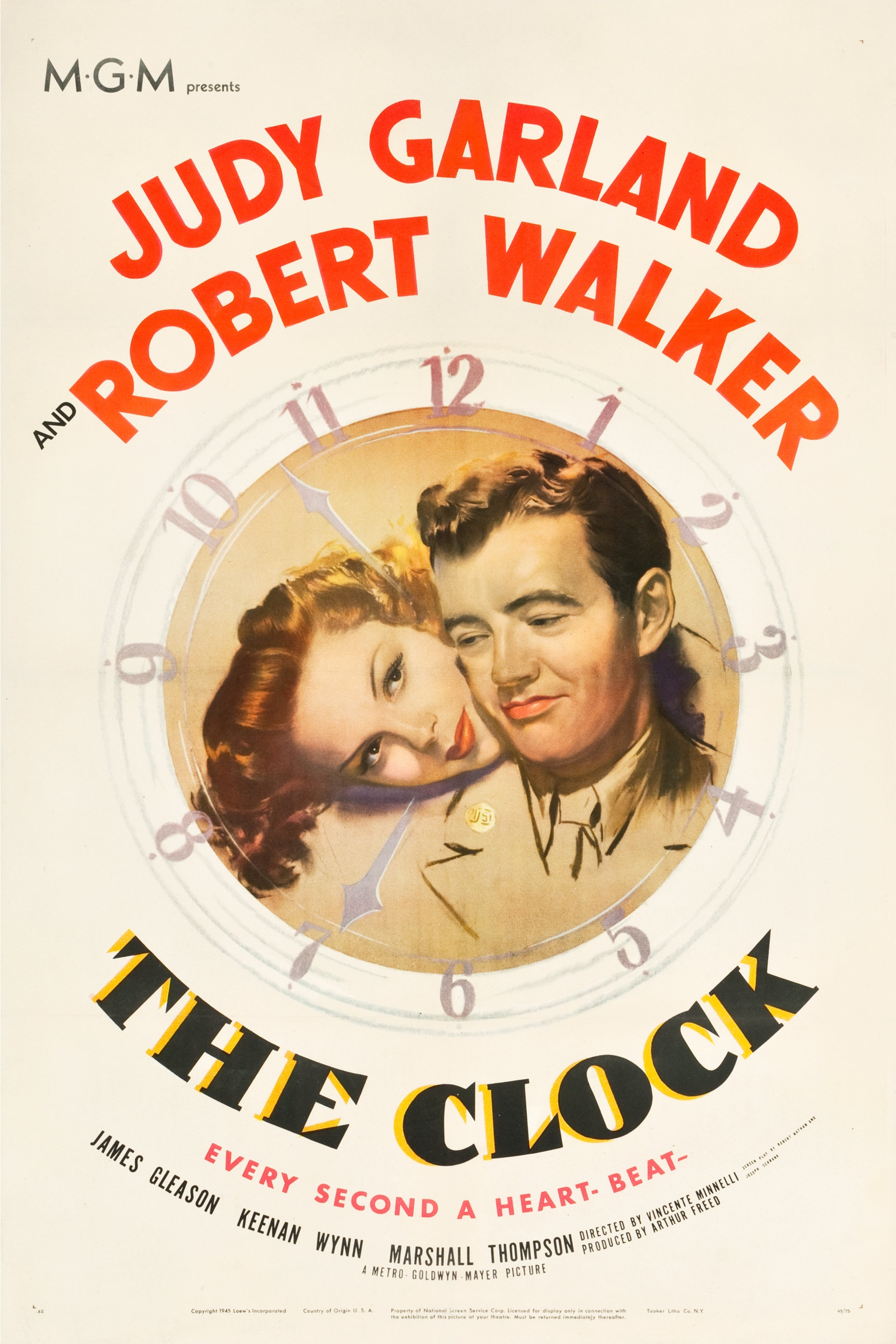
- Theatrical release poster
- Directed by: Vincente Minnelli
- Screenplay by: Robert Nathan; Joseph Schrank
- Story by: Paul Gallico; Pauline Gallico
- Produced by: Arthur Freed
- Starring: Judy Garland; Robert Walker; James Gleason
- Cinematography: George J. Folsey
- Edited by: George White
- Music by: George Bassman
- Production company: Metro-Goldwyn-Mayer
- Distributed by: Loew's, Inc.
- Release date: May 25, 1945
- Running time: 90 minutes
- Country: United States
- Language: English
- Budget: $1,560,000
- Box office: $2.8 million

The Clock (UK title Under the Clock) is a 1945 American romantic drama film starring Judy Garland and Robert Walker and directed by Garland's future husband, Vincente Minnelli. This was Garland's first dramatic role, as well as her first starring vehicle in which she did not sing.

== Plot ==
A small-town soldier, Joe Allen, on a 48-hour leave, meets Alice Mayberry in crowded Pennsylvania Station when she trips over his foot and breaks the heel off one of her shoes.

Although it is Sunday, Joe gets a shoe-repair shop owner to open his store and repair her shoe. Alice asks Joe where he is going, and he says he is on leave but has no definite destination while in New York. He accompanies her on her way home atop a double-decker bus, and she points out landmarks along the way, including the Central Park Zoo and the Metropolitan Museum of Art, both of which they visit.

When he asks her whether she is busy that evening, she says that she is. However, when he persists, and chases the bus she is riding down the street, she relents, promising to meet him under the clock at the Astor Hotel at 7:00 that evening.

Although her roommate chastises Alice for "picking up" a soldier, Alice keeps her date with Joe, arriving late, and the two have dinner.

Having missed the last bus home, they accept a ride with a milk man named Al Henry. When Al's truck has a flat tire, he and his passengers visit a lunch room to call for assistance. A drunk strikes Al, blackening his eye, and after the company's road repairman has changed the truck's tire, Alice and Joe spend the night delivering milk to their benefactor's customers. Later, they take Al home, where Al's wife invites them to join them for breakfast.

Alice and Joe agree to spend the day together before he must return to his base. However, on the way to her office so she can make arrangements for her absence, they become separated in the crowd while boarding a subway train. They try frantically to find one another, but they don't even know each other's last names. They finally reunite by returning to the place where they first met - the escalator at Penn Station.

After they profess their mutual love, Joe asks Alice to marry him before he departs that evening, and she consents. They run a maze of red tape and regulations, which nearly prevents them from marrying. Through their perseverance, they win over bureaucrats upon whom their success or failure depends.

Afterwards, Alice is sad, because she thinks that the hurried ceremony was "ugly". Only after they repeat their vows alone in a church pew does Alice feel truly married. They spend their honeymoon night at a hotel and have a final breakfast together. Alice sees Joe off at Penn Station, as his leave ends and he returns to war, and she heads back out, into the crowded city.

== Cast ==
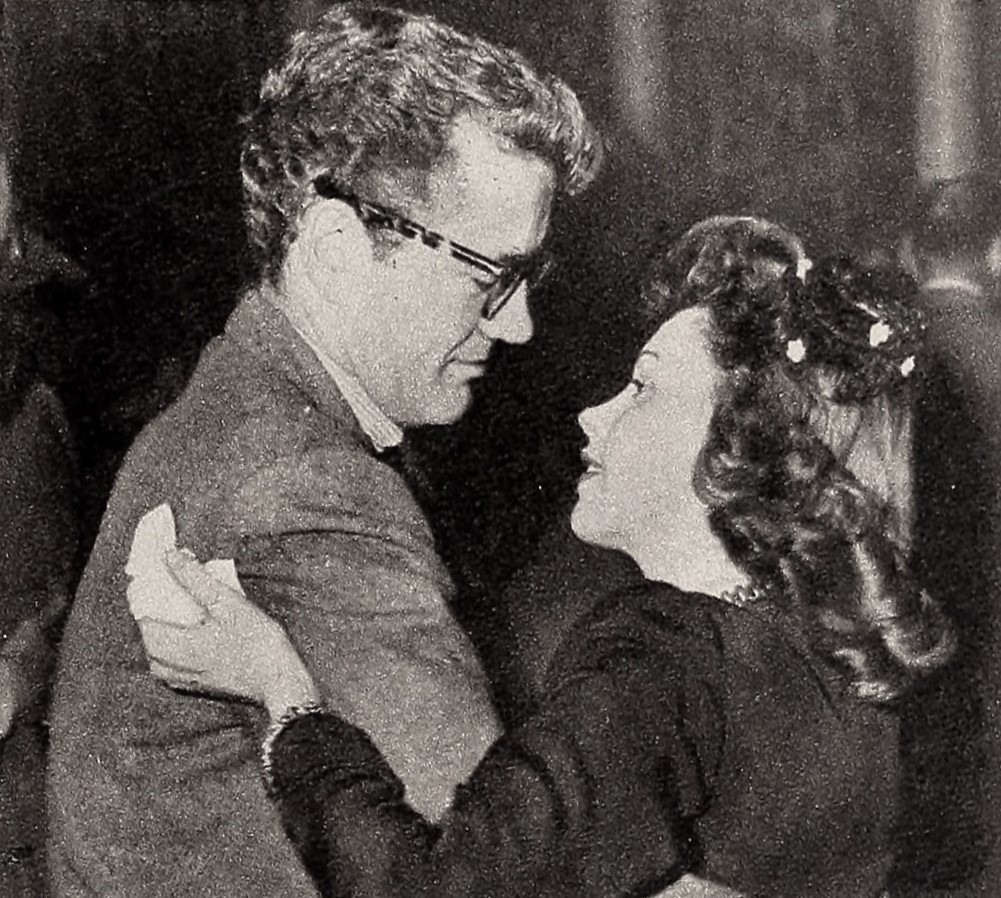
Lead actors Robert Walker and Judy Garland in 1945

- Judy Garland as Alice Maybery
- Robert Walker as Corporal Joe Allen
- James Gleason as Al Henry
- Keenan Wynn as The Drunk
- Marshall Thompson as Bill
- Lucile Gleason as Mrs. Al Henry
- Ruth Brady as Helen
- Robert Homans as Blood Test Official (uncredited)
- Jack Mower as Second Subway Official (uncredited)
- Larry Steers as Man on Bus (uncredited)

== Production ==
=== Casting ===
Garland had asked MGM to star in a straight dramatic role, wanting a break from the strenuous schedules of musical films. Although the studio was hesitant, the producer, Arthur Freed, eventually approached Garland with the script for The Clock after buying the rights to the short unpublished story by Pauline and Paul Gallico. Garland did not sing in the movie; it would be 16 years before she would make another non-musical dramatic film, with Judgment at Nuremberg (1961).

=== Filming ===
Fred Zinnemann was initially hired to direct the film. After about a month, he was removed at the request of Garland as there was a lack of chemistry between the two and early footage was disappointing. When Freed asked who Garland wanted to direct the film, she requested Vincente Minnelli who had just directed Garland the previous year in Meet Me in St. Louis, which was a tremendous success. Moreover, she and Minnelli had become romantically involved during the principal photography of Meet Me In St. Louis. During production of The Clock, they rekindled their romance, and were engaged by the end of shooting. Minnelli discarded most of the footage shot by Zinnemann and reshaped the film. He revised some scenes, tightened up the script, and incorporated New York City into the film's setting as a third character. As with Meet Me in St. Louis, he supervised adjustments to Garland's costumes, make-up, and hair.

Both producer Arthur Freed and Roger Edens have a cameo in this film. Near the beginning, Freed lights Walker's cigarette and then gives him the lighter. Edens, a music arranger and close friend of Garland, plays piano in a restaurant. Screenwriter Robert Nathan appears uncredited smoking a pipe.

Both stars of The Clock were plagued by personal problems that continued throughout their lives. During filming, Garland became increasingly addicted to prescription drugs given by the studio to control her weight and pep her up. Just prior to filming The Clock, Walker learned his wife, Jennifer Jones, was having an affair with film producer David O. Selznick and wanted a divorce. Walker began to spiral downward. During filming, Garland would often find him drunk in a Los Angeles bar and then sober him up throughout the night so he could appear before cameras the next day.

=== Locations ===
According to Robert Osborne in his introduction of this film on Turner Classic Movies, because World War II had not yet ended, filming on location was not considered cost effective or easy. Though the film was shot entirely on the MGM lot in Culver City, Minnelli's attempt to make New York City believable was extensive. In Studio 27, Minnelli had a reconstructed set of the Waiting Room at Penn Station built at a reported cost of $66,450. Reportedly, the only difficult aspect of the set was the working escalator in the center, using a moving belt rather than steps.

=== The clocks ===
In the film, the titular timepiece is located at the Hotel Astor, Times Square, which was once located at 1515 Broadway. Built in the Beaux Arts style in 1904, the Astor was demolished in 1967 and replaced by One Astor Plaza, a tall office-tower structure.

When Joe and Alice are accidentally separated, they find each other again at Pennsylvania Station near the information desk. Another clock is depicted hanging there, closely resembling the one prominently displayed in Grand Central Terminal.

== Reception ==
Released on May 25, 1945, The Clock made a respectable profit but it was not as successful as Meet Me in St. Louis, released the previous year. The movie was well received by critics who favorably noted Garland's transformation into a mature actress.

The New York Times: "A tender and refreshingly simple romantic drama. The atmosphere of the big town has seldom been conveyed more realistically upon the screen [-] the kind of picture that leaves one with a warm feeling toward his fellow man, especially towards the young folks who today are trying to crowd a lifetime of happiness into a few fleeting hours."

The New York Daily News; "The sweetest, most tender comedy-drama yet produced about a soldier and a girl. Judy Garland and Robert Walker are perfectly cast as the modest, sincere girl and the shy, sincere boy."

Writing in Time in 1945, critic James Agee stated, "The Clock (MGM), at its best, is so good that it inspires ingratitude for not being great ... The Clock is a pleasant, well-told romance rather than the great, true picture it might have been; but few films in recent years have managed so movingly to combine first-grade truth with second-grade fiction."

The Clock has a 100% rating on Rotten Tomatoes, based on 15 contemporary and modern reviews interviews.

=== Box office ===
According to MGM records the film earned $2,173,000 in the US and Canada and $610,000 elsewhere resulting in a profit of $217,000 - far less profitable than Garland's recent musicals but still a respectable showing.

== Home media ==
Released on VHS in the early 1990s, the film went out of print for several years until a limited colorized version of the film was released. Warner Home Video then released it on DVD in February 2007. It was then rereleased as a Blu-ray as part of Warner Archive Collection, restored from the original nitrate print on June 7, 2022.
