= See Here, Private Hargrove =

1942 book by Marion Hargrove

- First edition
- Author: Marion Hargrove
- Language: English
- Genre: Memoir
- Publisher: Henry Holt
- Publication date: 1942
- Publication place: United States

See Here, Private Hargrove is a 1942 book by Marion Hargrove, about his experiences in U.S. Army basic training.

== Origin ==
The author, a North Carolina native, was a correspondent for The Charlotte News prior to World War II. After he was drafted in the U.S. Army, he wrote columns for the newspaper as a private at Fort Bragg. See Here, Private Hargrove is his collection of those columns, detailing his experiences in basic training with humor and sarcasm.

See Here, Private Hargrove was a good-natured look at Army ways, its early portions making the Army seem like a boys' camp. Private Hargrove and his buddies irritated their sergeants endlessly but were punished with nothing worse than stints polishing garbage cans.

== Success ==
The light-hearted book was a hit with readers, spending 15 weeks on the New York Times best-seller list. It was regarded as a "publishing phenomenon," selling more than 400,000 hardcover copies, and more than two million copies in a paperback edition.

In 1944, the book was made into a movie of the same name, starring Robert Walker, Donna Reed, Keenan Wynn, Chill Wills and Robert Benchley. This was followed the next year by What Next, Corporal Hargrove?.

The book mentions fellow North Carolinian and journalist Lloyd Shearer, who later became a gossip columnist. It was said he "gained some notoriety" as a result of his appearance in the book.
