= Victory Through Air Power (film) =

1943 US partly-animated Disney film

- Theatrical release poster
- Directed by: Animated sequences: James Algar; Clyde Geronimi; Jack Kinney; de Seversky scenes: H.C. Potter
- Written by: Story direction: Perce Pearce; Story adaptation: T. Hee; Erdman Penner; Bill Cottrell; James Brodero; George Stallings; Jose Rodriguez
- Based on: Victory Through Air Power by Maj. Alexander P. Seversky
- Produced by: Walt Disney
- Starring: Alexander de Seversky
- Narrated by: Art Baker
- Cinematography: Ray Rennahan
- Edited by: Jack Dennis
- Music by: Edward H. Plumb; Paul J. Smith; Oliver Wallace
- Production company: Walt Disney Productions
- Distributed by: United Artists
- Release date: July 17, 1943
- Running time: 65 min
- Country: United States
- Language: English
- Budget: $788,000
- Box office: $799,000

Victory Through Air Power is a 1943 American animated propaganda film produced by Walt Disney Productions and released by United Artists on July 17, 1943 (as the first animated film from United Artists). It is based on the 1942 book of the same name by Alexander P. de Seversky, who himself appeared in the film, an unusual departure from Disney animated feature films of the time.

Edward H. Plumb, Paul J. Smith and Oliver Wallace were nominated for the Academy Award for Best Music Score of a Dramatic or Comedy Picture.

== Production ==
Walt Disney read Victory through Air Power and felt that its message was so important that he personally financed the animated production of the book. The film was primarily created to express Seversky's theories to government officials and the public. Film critic Richard Schickel says that Disney "pushed the film out in a hurry, even setting aside his distrust of limited animation under the impulses of urgency" (the only obvious use of limited animation, however, is in diagrammatic illustrations of Seversky's talking points; these illustrations featured continuous flowing streams of iconic aircraft, forming bridges or shields, and munitions flowing along assembly lines). It was not until 1945 Disney was able to pay off his $1.2 million ($17m 2021) war film deficit. After Disney's main distributor at the time RKO Radio Pictures refused to release the film in theaters, Walt decided to have United Artists (the distributor of many of his shorts between 1932 and 1937) release it instead, making it the first and only Disney animated feature to be released by a different film studio other than RKO or Walt Disney Studios.

== Reception ==
On July 11, 1943, the New York Times devoted a half page, "Victory from the Air", to a feature consisting of pictures of scenes from the film with short captions. This was possibly the first time that such skilled use of visual description had been placed at the service of an abstract political argument.

It is one thing to hear someone say that against modern bombers, 'bristling with armament ... small single-seater fighters will find themselves helpless, for their guns are not maneuverable—they are fixed and can only fire forward'. It is quite another to have this accompanied by vivid animations of swastika-tailed fighters jockeying for position and being shot down by beam-like animated blasts of fire from a bomber whose guns are "always in firing position".

Schickel quotes film critic James Agee as hoping that:

Major de Seversky and Walt Disney know what they are talking about, for I suspect that an awful lot of people who see Victory Through Air Power are going to think they do ... I had the feeling I was sold something under pretty high pressure, which I don't enjoy, and I am staggered at the ease with which such self-confidence, on matters of such importance, can be blared all over the nation, without cross-questioning.

== Thesis and impact ==
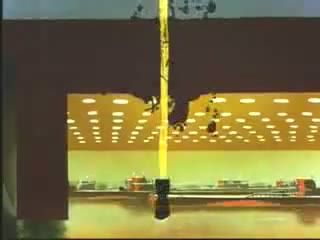
A still from Victory Through Air Power, showing a rocket–bomb destroying a Nazi German U-boat pen.

On December 8, 1941, Disney studios were essentially converted into a propaganda machine for the United States government. While most World War II films were created for training purposes, films such as Victory Through Air Power were created to catch the attention of government officials and to build public morale among the U.S. and Allied powers. Among the notables who decided after seeing the film that Seversky and Disney knew what they were talking about were Winston Churchill and Franklin D. Roosevelt.

Trailer for the film

The Disney studio sent a print for them to view when they were attending the Quebec Conference. According to Leonard Maltin, "it changed FDR's way of thinking—he agreed that Seversky was right". Maltin also adds that "it was only after Roosevelt saw 'Victory Through Air Power' that our country made the commitment to long-range bombing", although that is incorrect as the Allied Combined Bomber Offensive had already begun on June 10, 1943, two months before Roosevelt saw the film. Roosevelt recognized that film was an effective way to teach and Disney could provide Washington with high quality information. The American people were becoming united and Disney was able to inform them of the situation without presenting excessive chaos, as cartoons often do. The animation was popular among soldiers and was superior to other documentary films and written instructions at the time.

The film played a significant role for the Disney Corporation because it was the true beginning of educational films. The educational films would be, and still are, continually produced and used for the military, schools, and factory instruction. The company learned how to effectively communicate their ideas and efficiently produce the films while introducing the Disney characters to millions of people worldwide. Throughout the rest of the war, Disney characters effectively acted as ambassadors to the world. In addition to Victory Through Air Power, Disney produced Donald Gets Drafted, Education for Death, Der Fuehrer's Face, and various training films for the military, reusing animation from Victory Through Air Power in some of them.

One scene showed a fictional rocket bomb destroying a fortified German submarine pen. According to anecdote, this directly inspired the British to develop a real rocket bomb to attack targets that were heavily protected with thick concrete. Due to its origin, the weapon became known as the Disney bomb, and saw limited use as a bunker buster before the war ended. (Note: The development of a rocket bomb was discussed in the chapter entitled, "The Disney Bomb Project" in 92nd Bomb Group (H): Fame's Favored Few by Pat Spillman (1997).)

It also depicted the development of powerful ground-penetrating subterranean bombs which might trigger a seismic event to disable enemy factories, but in the event it was the above-ground atomic bomb that emerged to end the Pacific War. In retrospect, some of Seversky's proposals were derided as impractical, such as operating a major long-range air bombardment campaign from the Aleutians, a series of islands reaching westward from Alaska, which is a remote area with a highly volatile climate that makes for dangerous flying conditions.

== Home media ==
After its release and re-release in 1943 and 1944, there was no theatrical release for 60 years, perhaps because it was seen as propaganda, or perhaps because it was deemed offensive to Germans and Japanese. It was, however, available in 16 mm prints and occasionally screened in film history retrospectives. Additionally, the introductory "history-of-aviation" scene was excerpted in various episodes of the Disney anthology series on TV. In 2004, the film was released on DVD as part of the Walt Disney Treasures collection Walt Disney on the Front Lines.

== See also ==
- Walt Disney's World War II propaganda production
- Bombing of Tokyo, and the devastating Operation Meetinghouse raid (9/10 March 1945)
- Red Tails
