= Robert Walker (actor, born 1918) =

American actor (1918–1951)

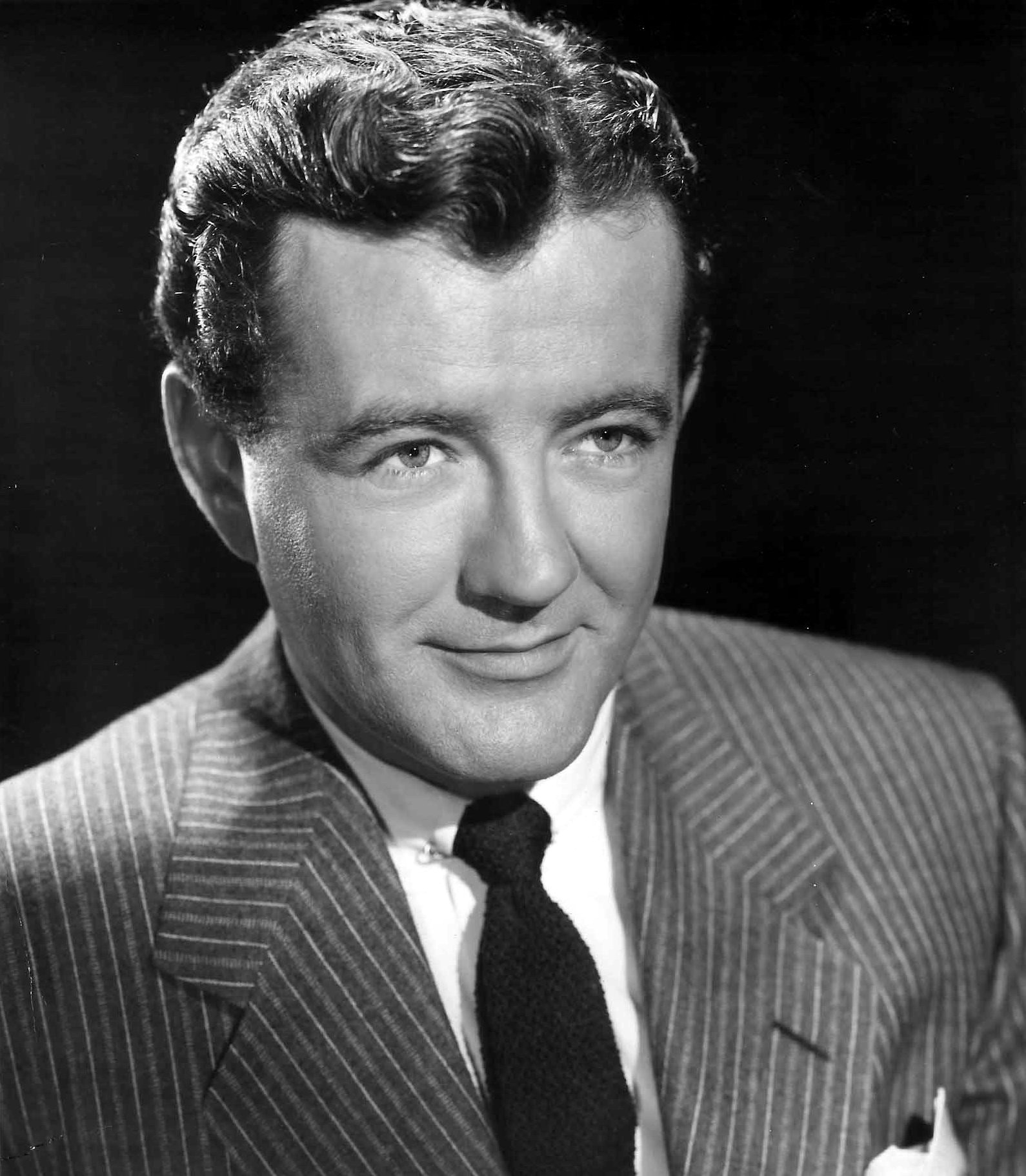
- Walker in Strangers on a Train (1951)
- Born: Robert Hudson Walker; October 13, 1918; Salt Lake City, Utah, U.S.
- Died: August 28, 1951 (aged 32); Los Angeles, California, U.S.
- Occupation: Actor
- Years active: 1939–1951
- Spouses: Jennifer Jones (m. 1939; div. 1945) Barbara Ford (m. 1948; div. 1948)
- Children: 2, including Robert Walker Jr.

Robert Hudson Walker (October 13, 1918 – August 28, 1951) was an American actor who starred as the villain in Alfred Hitchcock's thriller Strangers on a Train (1951), which was released shortly before his premature death.

He started in youthful boy-next-door roles, often as a World War II soldier. One of these roles was opposite his first wife, Jennifer Jones, in the World War II epic Since You Went Away (1944). He also played Jerome Kern in Till the Clouds Roll By. Twice divorced by 30, he was an alcoholic and mentally ill, which were exacerbated by his painful separation and divorce from Jones.

== Early life ==
Walker was born in Salt Lake City, Utah. Emotionally scarred by his parents' divorce when he was still a child, he subsequently developed an interest in acting, which led his maternal aunt, Hortense McQuarrie Odlum (then the president of Bonwit Teller), to offer to pay for his enrollment at the American Academy of Dramatic Arts in New York City in 1937.

== Career and personal life ==
While attending the American Academy of Dramatic Arts, Walker met fellow aspiring actress Phylis Isley, who later took the stage name Jennifer Jones. After a brief courtship, the couple married in Tulsa, Oklahoma, on January 2, 1939. Walker had some small unbilled parts in films such as Winter Carnival (1939) and two Lana Turner films at MGM: These Glamour Girls (1939) and Dancing Co-Ed (1939).

Walker and Jones' elder son, Robert Walker Jr., later became a successful film and television actor. Their other son, Michael Walker (1941–2007), was also an actor who appeared in films The Rogues (1964), Coronet Blue (1967), and Hell's Belles (1969), as well as several 1960s television series.

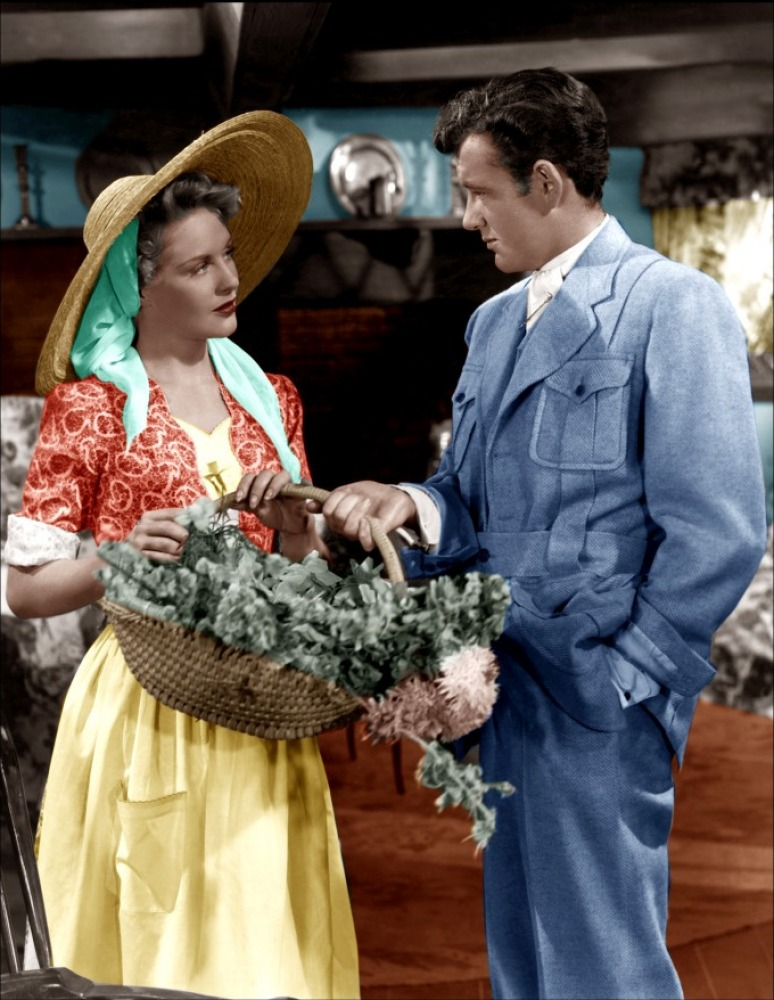
Dorothy Patrick and Walker in Till the Clouds Roll By (1946)

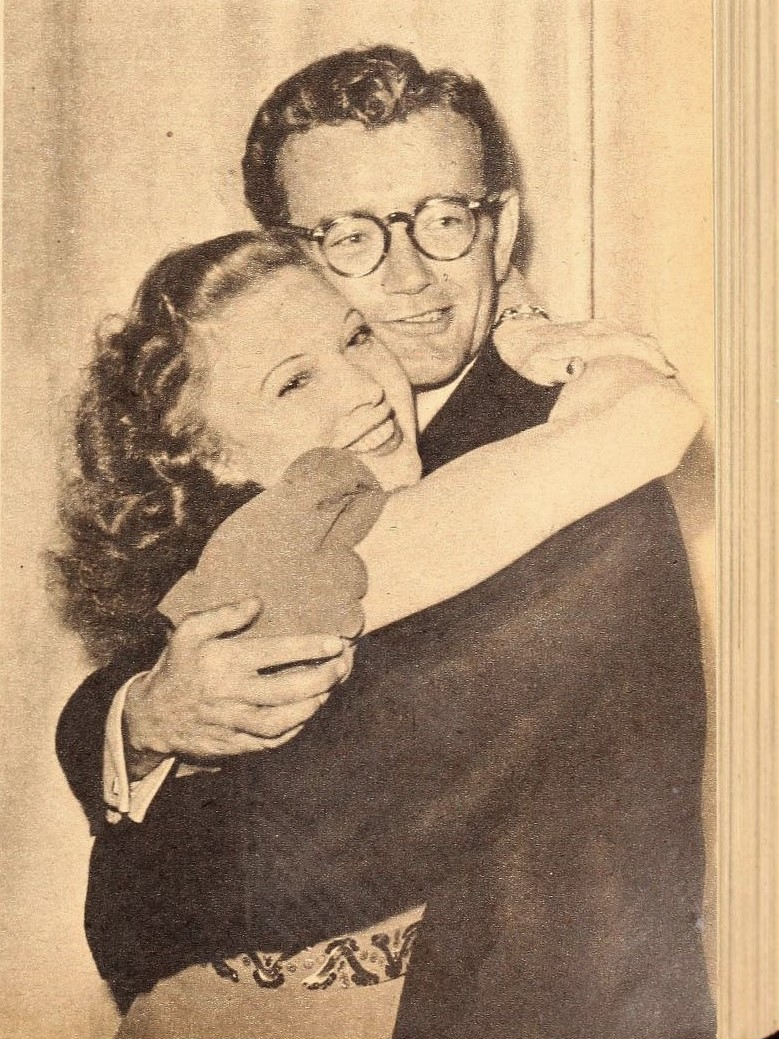
With Lurene Tuttle in 1946

=== Radio ===
Walker costarred in the weekly radio show Maudie's Diary from August 1941 to September 1942. Isley then returned to auditioning, and her luck changed when she was discovered in 1941 by producer David O. Selznick, who changed her name to Jennifer Jones and groomed her for stardom.

=== MGM ===
The couple returned to Hollywood, and Selznick's connections helped Walker secure a contract with Metro-Goldwyn-Mayer, where he started work on the war drama Bataan (1943), playing a sailor who fights in the Battle of Bataan. He followed it with a supporting role in Madame Curie (1943).

==== Stardom ====
Walker's charming demeanor and boyish good looks proved popular with audiences, and he was promoted to stardom with the title part of the romantic soldier in See Here, Private Hargrove (1944).

He also appeared in Selznick's Since You Went Away (1944), in which his wife and he portrayed doomed young lovers during World War II. By that time, Jones' affair with Selznick was a matter of common knowledge, and Jones and Walker separated in November 1943 during production of the film. The filming of their love scenes was trying for Walker, as Selznick insisted that Walker perform multiple takes for each scene with Jones. She filed for divorce in April 1945. Selznick and she were married in 1949. Since You Went Away was one of the most financially successful movies of 1944, earning over $7 million.

Returning to MGM, Walker appeared with Spencer Tracy and Van Johnson in Thirty Seconds Over Tokyo (1944), the story of the Doolittle Raid. He played flight engineer and turret gunner David Thatcher, and it was another box-office hit. Walker starred as a GI preparing for overseas deployment in The Clock (1945), with Judy Garland playing his love interest in her second nonmusical film. He then appeared in a romantic comedy with Hedy Lamarr and June Allyson titled Her Highness and the Bellboy (1945). He next appeared in a second Private Hargrove film, What Next, Corporal Hargrove? (1945), and a romantic comedy with June Allyson, The Sailor Takes a Wife (1945). Walker starred in the musical Till the Clouds Roll By (1946), in which he played the popular composer Jerome Kern. The film earned rental receipts of more than $6 million. He starred as composer Johannes Brahms in Song of Love (1947), which costarred Katharine Hepburn and Paul Henreid, but the lavish production lost MGM more than $1 million. He also appeared in a film about the construction of the atomic bomb, The Beginning or the End (1946), which also resulted in a loss at the box office, and a Tracy-Hepburn drama directed by Elia Kazan titled The Sea of Grass (1947), which was profitable.

In 1948, MGM lent Walker to Universal to star with Ava Gardner in the film One Touch of Venus, directed by William A. Seiter. The film was a nonmusical comedy adapted from a Broadway show with music by Kurt Weill. Walker married Barbara Ford, the daughter of director John Ford, in July 1948, but the marriage lasted only five months.

Back at MGM, Walker starred in two films that lost money, Please Believe Me (1950) with Deborah Kerr and The Skipper Surprised His Wife (1950) with Joan Leslie. More popular was Vengeance Valley (1951), a Western with Burt Lancaster.

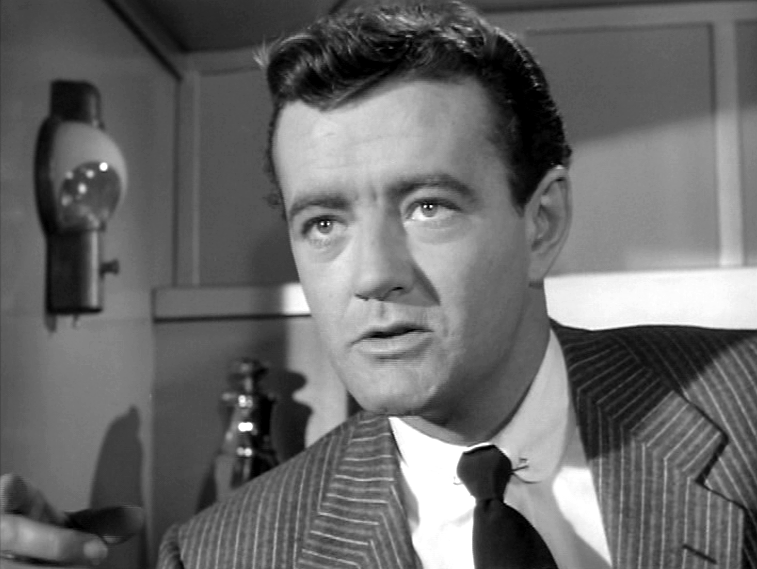
Walker in Strangers on a Train (1951)

=== Final years ===
In 1949, Walker spent time at the Menninger Clinic, where he was treated for a psychiatric disorder. Following his discharge, he was cast by director Alfred Hitchcock in Strangers on a Train (1951), for which he received acclaim for his performance as the charming psychopath Bruno Antony.

In his final film, Walker played the title role in Leo McCarey's My Son John (1952), a strongly anticommunist film, produced during the height of McCarthyism. Despite the film's theme and Walker's identification as a Republican, he took the role to work with McCarey and costar Helen Hayes rather than because of any political motivation. Walker died before production finished, so angles from his death scene in Strangers on a Train were spliced into a similar melodramatic death scene near the end of the film.

== Death ==
On the night of August 28, 1951, Walker's housekeeper found him in an emotional state. She called Walker's psychiatrist, Frederick Hacker, who arrived and administered amobarbital for sedation. Walker had allegedly been drinking before the outburst, and the combination of amobarbital and alcohol is believed to have caused him to lose consciousness and stop breathing. Efforts to resuscitate him failed, and he was pronounced dead shortly thereafter at the age of 32.

In her biography of Walker and Jones titled Star-Crossed, author Beverly Linet quoted Walker's friend Jim Henaghan (who was not mentioned in official accounts of the death), as saying that he was present at the events leading to Walker's death. Henaghan stated that he had visited Walker's house in Los Angeles, where they played cards and Walker was behaving normally. Henaghan said that Walker's psychiatrist arrived and insisted that he receive an injection, and when Walker refused, Henaghan restrained him for the physician to administer the injection. According to Henaghan, Walker soon lost consciousness, and frantic efforts to revive him failed.

== Filmography ==
Year	Film	Role	Notes
1939	Winter Carnival	Wes	Uncredited
1939	These Glamour Girls	College Boy	Uncredited
1939	Dancing Co-Ed	Boy	Uncredited
1943	Bataan	Leonard Purckett	
1943	Madame Curie	David Le Gros	
1944	See Here, Private Hargrove	Private Marion Hargrove	
1944	Since You Went Away	Corporal William G. "Bill" Smollett II	
1944	Thirty Seconds Over Tokyo	David Thatcher	
1945	The Clock	Corporal Joe Allen	Alternative title: Under the Clock
1945	Her Highness and the Bellboy	Jimmy Dobson	
1945	What Next, Corporal Hargrove?	Corporal Marion Hargrove	
1945	The Sailor Takes a Wife	John Hill	
1946	Till the Clouds Roll By	Jerome Kern	
1947	The Beginning or the End	Colonel Jeff Nixon	
1947	The Sea of Grass	Brock Brewton	
1947	Song of Love	Johannes Brahms	
1948	One Touch of Venus	Eddie Hatch	
1950	Please Believe Me	Terence Keath	
1950	The Skipper Surprised His Wife	Commander William J. Lattimer	
1951	Vengeance Valley	Lee Strobie	
1951	Strangers on a Train	Bruno Antony	Released two months before Walker's death; final role in a film released during Walker's lifetime
1952	My Son John	John Jefferson	Walker's final film role; released after his death
