= Victory Through Air Power =

Book by Alexander P. de Seversky

- First edition
- Author: Alexander P. de Seversky
- Language: English
- Genre: Non-fiction
- Publisher: Simon & Schuster
- Publication date: 1942

Victory Through Air Power is a 1942 non-fiction book by Alexander P. de Seversky. It was adapted into a 1943 feature film of the same name by Walt Disney Productions.

== Theories ==
De Seversky began his military life at a young age. After serving in the Imperial Russian Navy, he received high honors and was the ace in the Navy after engaging in over 57 aerial combats. After coming to the United States, he created the Seversky Aircraft company before being forced out of the presidency of his own company in 1939.

Seversky published Victory Through Air Power in 1942, and explained his theories of aviation and long-range bombing as influenced by General Billy Mitchell. Seversky argued that:

1. "The rapid expansion of the range and striking power of military aviation makes it certain that the United States will be as exposed to destruction from the air, within a predictable period, as are the British Isles today";
2. Those who deny this possibility are exhibiting something like a "Maginot line mentality";
3. The U.S. must begin preparing immediately for "an interhemispheric war direct across oceans";
4. The U.S. must become the dominant air-power nation, "even as England in its prime was the dominant sea-power nation of the world".

== Impact ==
President Eisenhower quoting Seversky

- 1942: "It is though a bow-and-arrow army, having been routed by gunpowder, sought to win back lost ground by throwing in yet more bows and arrows." (page 338)

(Seversky's criticism of the post-Pearl Harbor plan to use US airpower in the Pacific only to "assist surface operations" instead of for strategic bombing.)

- 1959: "The President said he thought we were talking about bows and arrows at a time of gunpowder when we spoke of bombers [like the B-70] in the missile age."

Appearing less than six months after the attack on Pearl Harbor in 1941 and the United States' entry into World War II, the book was extremely popular, influential, and controversial. The book was ghost written by Eugene Lyons and William Bradford Huie. Seversky advocated the formation of an independent air force, the development of long-range bombers (meaning an intercontinental range of 3,000 miles or more) and a commitment to strategic use of air power (as opposed to its then-traditional use as cover or support for ground-based operations). His plans implicitly involved diversion of resources away from current war operations.

On May 3, 1942, Fletcher Pratt reviewed the book, saying:

No one has produced a more intelligent and comprehensive analysis of any feature of the world struggle. Probably nobody has written anything more truly prophetic; and no one is more wrongheaded.

On May 4, 1942, it appeared on the New York Times bestseller list, reaching No. 1 on the list in mid-August and staying there for four weeks. In the 10 May "Speaking of Books" column, J. D. A. bracketed it with Mein Kampf and Lieut. Col. Kernan's Defense Will Not Win the War to illustrate his point that

In no other war have books played such an important part… Books are not only supplying information. They are furnishing weapons for the successful prosecution of the war.

Its familiarity to the general public was such that it could appear in a 1943 Bugs Bunny cartoon, Falling Hare, in which the title character reads "Victory Thru Hare Power".

Filmmaker Walt Disney read the book, and felt that its message was so important that he would personally finance a partly-animated short, also called Victory Through Air Power, which was released in July 1943. Disney's purpose for creating the film was to promote Seversky's theories to government officials and the public. After seeing the film, Winston Churchill and Franklin D. Roosevelt decided that Seversky knew what he was talking about, changing the course of the war.
