= Walt Disney's Treasury of Classic Tales =

American comic strip (1952–1987)

- Author: Various
- Illustrator: Various
- Current status/schedule: Concluded
- Launch date: July 13, 1952
- End date: February 15, 1987
- Syndicate: King Features Syndicate
- Genre: Funny animals

Walt Disney's Treasury of Classic Tales is an American Disney comic strip, which ran on Sundays in newspapers from July 13, 1952, until February 15, 1987. It was distributed by King Features Syndicate. Each story adapted a different Disney film, such as Darby O'Gill and the Little People, Peter Pan, or Davy Crockett. It was run in relatively few papers, with 58 in 1957 and 55 in 1966, and was principally a vehicle for promoting new and re-released Disney films.

== Publication history ==
From March 8 to June 18, 1950, Disney distributed a limited-time Sunday strip adaptations of their new animated feature Cinderella, written by Frank Reilly, with art by Manuel Gonzales and Dick Moores. The same team followed the next year with Alice in Wonderland, which ran from September 2 to December 16, 1951. Judged a success, the experiment was turned into an ongoing feature in 1952, beginning with The Story of Robin Hood.

The strip featured a wide variety of Disney stories. The animated features adapted for the strip include Peter Pan (1953), Lady and the Tramp (1955), Sleeping Beauty (1958), The Sword in the Stone (1963) and The Jungle Book (1968). Classic Tales also featured animated shorts, including Lambert the Sheepish Lion (1956) and Ben and Me (1953), and featurettes like Peter & The Wolf (1954) and Winnie the Pooh and the Honey Tree (1966).

Treasury of Classic Tales also adapted live-action films like Old Yeller (1957–58), Swiss Family Robinson (1960), Mary Poppins (1964) and The Love Bug (1969). The strip transitioned from historical dramas like The Sword and the Rose (1953) and Kidnapped (1960) to comedies like The Shaggy Dog (1959) and The Parent Trap (1961).

The 1979–80 adaptation of The Black Hole was particularly notable for featuring pencil art by comics icon Jack Kirby, with Mike Royer inking.

Some of the stories created toward the end of the strip's run in the 1980s were original stories featuring characters from different Disney animated movies, including The Return of the Rescuers (1983), Dumbo, the Substitute Stork (1984) and Cinderella: Bibbidi-Bobbodi-Who? (1984).

Most stories ran for thirteen weeks. A total of 129 stories were created between 1952 and 1987.

== List of story titles ==
Title	Year	Dates	Writing	Art	INDUCKS link
The Story of Robin Hood	1952	July 13 – Dec 28	Frank Reilly	Jesse Marsh	ToCT 1
Peter Pan	1953	Jan 4 – June 14	Frank Reilly	Manuel Gonzales & Dick Moores	ToCT 2
The Sword and the Rose	1953	June 21 – Oct 25	Frank Reilly	Jesse Marsh	ToCT 3
Ben and Me	1953	Nov 1 – Dec 27	Frank Reilly	Manuel Gonzales & Dick Moores	ToCT 4
Rob Roy	1954	Jan 3 – May 30	Frank Reilly	Jesse Marsh	ToCT 5
Peter & The Wolf	1954	June 6 – July 25	Frank Reilly	Manuel Gonzales & Dick Moores	ToCT 6
20,000 Leagues Under the Sea	1954	Aug 1 – Dec 26	Frank Reilly	Jesse Marsh	ToCT 7
Lady and the Tramp	1955	Jan 2 – July 10	Frank Reilly	Manuel Gonzales & Dick Moores	ToCT 8
The Legends of Davy Crockett	1956	July 7, 1955 – Jan 8	Frank Reilly	Jesse Marsh	ToCT 9
The Littlest Outlaw	1956	Jan 15 – March 26	Frank Reilly	Jesse Marsh	ToCT 10
The Great Locomotive Chase	1956	April 2 – July 29	Frank Reilly	Jesse Marsh	ToCT 11
Lambert the Sheepish Lion	1956	Aug 5 – Sep 30	Frank Reilly	Floyd Gottfredson	ToCT 12
Westward Ho, the Wagons!	1956–1957	Oct 7 – Jan 27	Frank Reilly	Jesse Marsh	ToCT 13
Gus & Jaq	1957	Feb 3 – March 31	Frank Reilly	Ken Hultgren	ToCT 14
Johnny Tremain	1957	Apr 7 – June 30	Frank Reilly	Jesse Marsh	ToCT 15
Perri	1957	July 7 – Nov 24	Frank Reilly	Jesse Marsh	ToCT 16
Old Yeller	1957–1958	Dec 1 – Feb 23	Frank Reilly	Jesse Marsh	ToCT 17
The Seven Dwarfs & The Witch Queen	1958	March 2 – Apr 27	Frank Reilly	Julius Svedsen	ToCT 18
The Light in the Forest	1958	May 4 – July 27	Frank Reilly	Jesse Marsh	ToCT 19
Sleeping Beauty	1958	Aug 3 – Dec 28	Frank Reilly	Julius Svedsen	ToCT 20
The Shaggy Dog	1959	Jan 4 – Apr 26	Frank Reilly	Jesse Marsh	ToCT 21
Darby O'Gill and the Little People	1959	May 3 – Aug 3	Frank Reilly	Jesse Marsh	ToCT 22
Third Man on the Mountain	1959	Sept 6 – Dec 27	Frank Reilly	Jesse Marsh	ToCT 23
Toby Tyler	1960	Jan 3 – Mar 27	Frank Reilly	Jesse Marsh	ToCT 24
Kidnapped	1960	Apr 3 – June 26	Frank Reilly	Jesse Marsh	ToCT 25
Pollyanna	1960	July 3 – Sep 25	Frank Reilly	Jesse Marsh	ToCT 26
Swiss Family Robinson	1960	Oct 2 – Dec 25	Frank Reilly	Jesse Marsh	ToCT 27
101 Dalmatians	1961	Jan 1 – Mar 26	Frank Reilly	Bill Wright & Chuck Fuson, Manuel Gonzales & Floyd Gottfredson	ToCT 28
Nikki, Wild Dog of the North	1961	Apr 2 – June 25	Frank Reilly	Jesse Marsh	ToCT 29
The Parent Trap	1961	July 2 – Sep 25	Frank Reilly	Jesse Marsh	ToCT 30
Babes in Toyland	1961	Oct 1 – Dec 31	Frank Reilly	Joseph Hale	ToCT 31
Moon Pilot	1962	Jan 7 – Mar 25	Frank Reilly	Jesse Marsh	ToCT 32
Bon Voyage!	1962	Apr 1 – June 24	Frank Reilly	John Ushler	ToCT 33
Big Red	1962	July 1 – Sep 30	Frank Reilly	Jesse Marsh	ToCT 34
In Search of the Castaways	1962	Oct 7 – Dec 30	Frank Reilly	John Ushler	ToCT 35
Son of Flubber	1963	Jan 6 – Mar 31	Frank Reilly	John Ushler	ToCT 36
Miracle of the White Stallions	1963	Apr 7 – June 30	Frank Reilly	John Ushler	ToCT 37
Savage Sam	1963	July 7 – Sep 29	Frank Reilly	John Ushler	ToCT 38
The Sword in the Stone	1963	Oct 6 – Dec 29	Frank Reilly	John Ushler	ToCT 39
A Tiger Walks	1964	Jan 5 – March 29	Frank Reilly	John Ushler	ToCT 40
The Three Lives of Thomasina	1964	Apr 6 – June 28	Frank Reilly	John Ushler	ToCT 41
The Moon-Spinners	1964	July 5 – Sep 27	Frank Reilly	John Ushler	ToCT 42
Mary Poppins	1964	Oct 4 – Dec 27	Frank Reilly	John Ushler	ToCT 43
Those Calloways	1965	Jan 3 – Mar 28	Frank Reilly	John Ushler	ToCT 44
The Monkey's Uncle	1965	Apr 4 – June 27	Frank Reilly	John Ushler	ToCT 45
Dumbo	1965	July 4 – Sep 26	Frank Reilly	John Ushler	ToCT 46
That Darn Cat!	1965	Oct 3 – Dec 26	Frank Reilly	John Ushler	ToCT 47
Winnie the Pooh and the Honey Tree	1966	Jan 2 – Mar 27	Frank Reilly	John Ushler	ToCT 48
Lt. Robin Crusoe, U.S.N.	1966	Apr 3 – June 26	Frank Reilly	John Ushler	ToCT 49
The Fighting Prince of Donegal	1966	July 3 – Sep 25	Frank Reilly	John Ushler	ToCT 50
Follow Me, Boys!	1966	Oct 2 – Nov 27	Frank Reilly	John Ushler	ToCT 51
Monkeys, Go Home!	1966–1967	Dec 4 – Jan 29	Frank Reilly	John Ushler	ToCT 52
The Adventures of Bullwhip Griffin	1967	Feb 5 – Apr 30	Frank Reilly	John Ushler	ToCT 53
The Gnome-Mobile	1967	May 7 – July 30	Frank Reilly	John Ushler	ToCT 54
The Happiest Millionaire	1967	Aug 6 – Oct 29	Frank Reilly	John Ushler	ToCT 55
The Jungle Book	1967–1968	Nov 5 – Jan 28	Frank Reilly	John Ushler	ToCT 56
Blackbeard's Ghost	1968	Feb 4 – Apr 28	Frank Reilly	John Ushler	ToCT 57
Never A Dull Moment	1968	May 6 – July 28	Frank Reilly	John Ushler	ToCT 58
Winnie the Pooh and the Blustery Day	1968	Aug 4 – Sep 29	Frank Reilly	John Ushler	ToCT 59
The Horse in the Gray Flannel Suit	1968	Oct 6 – Dec 29	Frank Reilly	John Ushler	ToCT 60
Smith!	1969	Jan 5 – Feb 23	Frank Reilly	John Ushler	ToCT 61
The Love Bug	1969	Mar 2 – May 25	Frank Reilly	John Ushler	ToCT 62
Hang Your Hat on the Wind!	1969	June 1 – Aug 31	Frank Reilly	John Ushler	ToCT 63
My Dog, the Thief	1969	Sept 7 – Nov 30	Frank Reilly	John Ushler	ToCT 64
The Computer Wore Tennis Shoes	1969–1970	Dec 7 – Feb 22	Frank Reilly	John Ushler	ToCT 65
King of the Grizzlies	1970	Mar 1 – May 31	Frank Reilly	John Ushler	ToCT 66
The Boatniks	1970	June 7 – Aug 30	Frank Reilly	John Ushler	ToCT 67
The Aristocats	1970	Sept 6 – Dec 27	Frank Reilly	John Ushler	ToCT 68
The Barefoot Executive	1971	Jan 3 – Mar 28	Frank Reilly	John Ushler	ToCT 69
The Million Dollar Duck	1971	Apr 4 – June 27	Frank Reilly	John Ushler	ToCT 70
Bedknobs and Broomsticks	1971	July 4 – Oct 31	Frank Reilly	John Ushler	ToCT 71
The Living Desert	1971	Nov 7 – Dec 26	Frank Reilly	John Ushler	ToCT 72
Napoleon and Samantha	1972	Jan 2 – Mar 26	Frank Reilly	John Ushler	ToCT 73
Now You See Him, Now You Don't	1972	Apr 2 – June 25	Frank Reilly	John Ushler	ToCT 74
The Legend of Lobo	1972	July 2 – Sep 24	Frank Reilly	John Ushler	ToCT 75
Snowball Express	1972	Oct 1 – Dec 31	Frank Reilly	John Ushler	ToCT 76
The World's Greatest Athlete	1973	Jan 7 – Mar 26	Frank Reilly	Mike Arens	ToCT 77
Cinderella	1973	Apr 1 – June 24	Frank Reilly	Mike Arens	ToCT 78
One Little Indian	1973	July 1 – Sep 30	Frank Reilly	Mike Arens	ToCT 79
Robin Hood	1973–1974	Oct 7 – Jan 27	Frank Reilly	Mike Arens	ToCT 80
Alice in Wonderland	1974	Feb 3 – Apr 28	Frank Reilly	Mike Arens	ToCT 81
Herbie Rides Again	1974	May 5 – July 28	Frank Reilly	Mike Arens	ToCT 82
The Bears and I	1974	Aug 4 – Sep 29	Frank Reilly	Mike Arens	ToCT 83
The Island at the Top of the World	1974–1975	October 6, 1974 – January 26, 1975	Frank Reilly	Mike Arens	ToCT 84
Escape to Witch Mountain	1975	Feb 3 – Apr 27	Carl Fallberg	Mike Arens	ToCT 85
The Apple Dumpling Gang	1975	May 4 – June 29	Frank Reilly	Mike Arens	ToCT 86
One of Our Dinosaurs Is Missing	1975	July 6 – Sep 28	Frank Reilly	Mike Arens	ToCT 87
Winnie the Pooh and Tigger Too	1975	Oct 5 – Nov 30	Frank Reilly	Mike Arens	ToCT 88
No Deposit, No Return	1975–1976	December 7, 1975 – February 29, 1976	Frank Reilly & Carl Fallberg	Mike Arens	ToCT 89
Gus	1976	Mar 7 – May 30	Carl Fallberg	Mike Arens	ToCT 90
Treasure of Matecumbe	1976	June 6 – Aug 29	Carl Fallberg	Mike Arens	ToCT 91
The Shaggy D.A.	1976	Sept 5 – Nov 28	Carl Fallberg	Richard Moore	ToCT 92
Freaky Friday	1976–1977	Dec 5 – Feb 27	Al Stoffel	Richard Moore	ToCT 93
The Rescuers	1977	Mar 6 – May 29	Carl Fallberg	Richard Moore	ToCT 94
Herbie Goes to Monte Carlo	1977	June 5 – Aug 28	Al Stoffel	Richard Moore	ToCT 95
Pete's Dragon	1977	Sept 4 – Nov 27	Carl Fallberg	Richard Moore	ToCT 96
Candleshoe	1977–1978	December 4, 1977 – Feb 26	Carl Fallberg & Al Stoffel	Richard Moore	ToCT 97
The Cat from Outer Space	1978	Mar 5 – May 28	Carl Fallberg	Richard Moore	ToCT 98
Hot Lead and Cold Feet	1978	June 4 – Aug 27	Al Stoffel	Richard Moore	ToCT 99
Pinocchio	1978	Sept 3 – Nov 26	Carl Fallberg	Richard Moore	ToCT 100
The North Avenue Irregulars	1978–1979	Dec 3 – Feb 25	Carl Fallberg	Richard Moore	ToCT 101
The Apple Dumpling Gang Rides Again	1979	Mar 4 – May 27	Al Stoffel	Richard Moore	ToCT 102
Unidentified Flying Oddball	1979	June 3 – Aug 26	Al Stoffel	Richard Moore	ToCT 103
The Black Hole	1979–1980	Sept 2 – Feb 24	Carl Fallberg	Jack Kirby & Mike Royer	ToCT 104
The Watcher in the Woods	1980	Mar 2 – May 25	Carl Fallberg	Richard Moore	ToCT 105
The Last Flight of Noah's Ark	1980	June 1 – Aug 24	Al Stoffel	Richard Moore	ToCT 106
The Devil and Max Devlin	1980	Aug 31 – Nov 23	Al Stoffel	Richard Moore	ToCT 107
Condorman	1980–1981	Nov 30 – Apr 12	Greg Crosby	Russ Heath	ToCT 108
The Fox and the Hound	1981	Apr 19 – Aug 30	Jeannette Steiner	Richard Moore	ToCT 109
Night Crossing	1981–1982	Sept 6 – Jan 17	Jeannette Steiner	Richard Moore	ToCT 110
Tron	1982	Jan 24 – June 6	Jeannette Steiner	Richard Moore	ToCT 111
Tex	1982	June 13 – Sep 26	Jeannette Steiner	Richard Moore	ToCT 112
Mickey's Christmas Carol	1982	Oct 3 – Dec 26	Carl Fallberg	Richard Moore & Frank Johnson	ToCT 113
Ferdinand the Bull & The Robbers	1983	Jan 2 – Mar 6	Carl Fallberg	Richard Moore	ToCT 114
Snow White and the Seven Dwarfs	1983	Mar 13 – June 26	Carl Fallberg	Richard Moore	ToCT 115
The Adventures of Mr. Toad	1983	July 3 – Sep 25	Tom Yakutis	Richard Moore	ToCT 116
The Return of the Rescuers	1983	Oct 2 – Dec 25	Tom Yakutis	Richard Moore	ToCT 117
Dumbo, the Substitute Stork	1984	Jan 1 – Mar 25	Tom Yakutis	Richard Moore	ToCT 118
Robin Hood in: Rich John, Poor John	1984	Apr 1 – June 24	Tom Yakutis	Richard Moore	ToCT 119
Cinderella: Bibbidi-Bobbodi-Who?	1984	July 1 – Sep 23	Tom Yakutis	Richard Moore	ToCT 120
Pinocchio & Jiminy Cricket: A Coat Tale	1984	Sept 30 – Dec 30	Carl Fallberg	Richard Moore	ToCT 121
Black Arrow	1985	Jan 6 – Mar 31	Tom Yakutis	Richard Moore	ToCT 122
Return to Oz	1985	Apr 7 – July 14	Carl Fallberg	Richard Moore	ToCT 123
The Black Cauldron	1985	July 21 – Oct 27	Tom Yakutis	Richard Moore	ToCT 124
The Journey of Natty Gann	1985–1986	Nov 3 – Jan 26	Don Dougherty	Richard Moore	ToCT 125
The Search For Sleeping Beauty	1986	Feb 2 – Apr 27	Carl Fallberg	Richard Moore	ToCT 126
The Great Mouse Detective	1986	May 4 – July 27	Carl Fallberg	Richard Moore	ToCT 127
Song of the South	1986	Aug 3 – Nov 16	Carl Fallberg	Richard Moore	ToCT 128
Tramp's Cat-astrophe	1986–1987	Nov 23 – Feb 15	Carl Fallberg	Richard Moore	ToCT 129

== Reprintings ==
In 2016, IDW Publishing and their imprint The Library of American Comics (LoAC) began to collect all the Treasury of Classic Tales stories in a definitive hardcover reprint series. As of 2019, three volumes have been published, reprinting all the stories from Robin Hood (1952) through In Search of the Castaways (1962). In April 2018, it was announced that, due to the sales goal of the series not being met, the third volume may be the last one to be published.
