= The Castaway Cowboy =

1974 film by Vincent McEveety

- Theatrical release poster
- Directed by: Vincent McEveety
- Written by: Don Tait
- Produced by: Ron Miller; Winston Hibler
- Starring: James Garner; Vera Miles; Eric Shea; Robert Culp
- Cinematography: Andrew Jackson
- Edited by: Cotton Warburton
- Music by: Robert F. Brunner
- Production company: Walt Disney Productions
- Distributed by: Buena Vista Distribution
- Release date: August 1, 1974
- Running time: 91 minutes
- Country: United States
- Language: English

The Castaway Cowboy is a 1974 American Western comedy film released by Walt Disney Productions starring James Garner, Vera Miles, Eric Shea, and Robert Culp about a Texas rancher who gets shanghaied, then jumps ship and finds himself washed ashore in Hawaii. Filmed on location in Hawaii, the film was directed by Vincent McEveety and written by Don Tait and Richard M. Bluel. Garner later wrote that the best thing in the film was Hawaiian scenery.

== Plot ==
Texas cowboy, Lincoln Costain (James Garner), gets "shanghaied" in San Francisco, then jumps ship and washes ashore on the Hawaiian island of Kauai, right into the arms of widow Henrietta MacAvoy (Vera Miles) and her son (Eric Shea) who are struggling to make a living as farmers. A lot of wild cattle often trample their crops, so Costain gets the idea to start cattle ranching instead. The Hawaiian farm hands don't readily take to the American cowboy culture, and Calvin Bryson (Robert Culp), is a banker with eyes to grab Henrietta's land and maybe Henrietta herself.

== Cast ==
- James Garner as Lincoln Costain
- Vera Miles as Henrietta MacAvoy
- Eric Shea as Booton 'Little Maca' MacAvoy
- Robert Culp as Calvin Bryson
- Elizabeth Smith as Liliha (MacAvoy housekeeper)
- Manu Tupou as Kimo
- Gregory Sierra as Marruja (Bryson's henchman)
- Shug Fisher as Capt. Cary
- Nephi Hannemann as Malakoma (Kahuna)
- Lito Capiña as Leleo
- Ralph Hanalei as Hopu
- Kim Kahana as Oka (as Kahana)
- Lee Woodd as Palani
- Luis Delgado as The Hatman (loses hat to Costain)
- Buddy Joe Hooker as Boatman taking Costain to ship
- Patrick Sullivan Burke as Sea captain in poker game
- Jerry Velasco as Hawaiian cowboy (voice)

== See also ==
- List of American films of 1974
