= The Apple Dumpling Gang Rides Again =

1979 film by Vincent McEveety

- Promotional poster
- Directed by: Vincent McEveety
- Written by: Don Tait
- Produced by: Tom Leetch; Ron W. Miller
- Starring: Tim Conway; Don Knotts; Tim Matheson; Kenneth Mars; Jack Elam
- Cinematography: Frank V. Phillips
- Edited by: Gordon Brenner
- Music by: Buddy Baker; Joseph S. Dubin (orchestration)
- Production company: Walt Disney Productions
- Distributed by: Buena Vista Distribution
- Release date: June 27, 1979
- Running time: 88 minutes
- Country: United States
- Language: English
- Box office: $20,931,111

The Apple Dumpling Gang Rides Again is a 1979 American comedy-Western film directed by Vincent McEveety. Produced by Walt Disney Productions, it is a sequel to The Apple Dumpling Gang (1975), starring the comedy duo of Tim Conway and Don Knotts reprising their respective roles as Amos and Theodore. The film also stars Tim Matheson, Harry Morgan, and Kenneth Mars.

== Plot ==
Amos Tucker and Theodore Ogelvie, a pair of bumbling holdup men now going straight, arrive in the "boom town" of Junction City to start anew. The duo end up causing havoc while getting cheated out of their money by bank robbers Wes Hardin and Hank Starrett. Things worsen when Amos and Theodore end up suspected of the robbery and on the run from the town's feared lawman Marshal Woolly Bill Hitchcock, who developed a personal vendetta toward Amos and Theodore after they accidentally humiliated and injured him on two occasions. To escape Hitchcock's vengeance, Amos and Theodore ditch their donkey Clarise, as she was used by the robbers, and enlist in the United States Cavalry at Fort Concho. The duo's bunglings and a run-in with a now insane marshal, who found them by following Clarise, result in the fort being burned to the ground.

The following day, the fort's commander, Major Gaskill, is relieved of his position while Amos and Theodore are placed in a military jail. The jail turns out to be a cover for robber baron Big Mac, who proceeds to recruit Amos and Theodore for an upcoming train robbery. Still determined to go straight, the boys attempt to extricate themselves from the situation by warning the local sheriff. The sheriff not available, they are told to visit the saloon as there is a visiting U.S. Marshall. After dressing up as bar-room dance girls to hide themselves from Big Mac's gang, having another encounter with Hitchcock, and making a trade for blankets to hide themselves, Amos and Theodore accidentally end up on the train Big Mac is targeting. With the help of Jeff Reed, an army intelligence officer who posed as an enlisted soldier to uncover a conspiracy of military robberies, and Major Gaskill's daughter Millie, they arrest the robbers and their inside man Lt. Jim Ravencroft. Soon after being given pardons, Amos and Theodore decide to resume working at Russell Donovan's farm.

== Cast ==
- Tim Conway as Amos Tucker
- Don Knotts as Theodore Ogelvie
- Tim Matheson as Private Jeff Reed
- Harry Morgan as Major Gaskill
- Kenneth Mars as Marshal Woolly Bill Hitchcock
- Elyssa Davalos as Miss Millie Gaskill
- Jack Elam as Mac "Big Mac"
- Robert Pine as Lieutenant Jim Ravencroft
- Ruth Buzzi as Old Tough Kate / "Granny"
- Audrey Totter as Martha Osten
- Richard X. Slattery as Sergeant Slaughter
- John Crawford as Sherick
- Ralph Manza as Little Guy
- Cliff Osmond as Wes Hardin
- Ted Gehring as Hank Starrett
- Robert Totten as Blainey
- James Almanzar as Lennie
- Shug Fisher as The Bartender
- Rex Holman as Reno
- Roger Mobley as Sentry

== Production ==
Parts of the film were shot at Kanab movie fort and Kanab Creek in Utah. The railroad scenes were filmed on the Sierra Railroad in Tuolumne County, California.

== Reception ==
Vincent Canby of The New York Times thought that Kenneth Mars was "very funny" and that Harry Morgan "has some nice moments" as well. Variety wrote that the film "lurches from one set piece to another, in a fashion that makes its 88-minute running time seem much longer. Conway and Knotts have perfected their bumbling routines to a very minor art form, but principal laughs are supplied by drunk jokes, and character names such as Jack Elam's Big Mac. When hamburger trademarks become chief yock-suppliers, time has come to look elsewhere". Kevin Thomas of the Los Angeles Times called the film "delightful" with "much humor and action. Indeed, it's more inventive — and eventful — than the more sophisticated comedy-western Butch and Sundance: The Early Days". Gary Arnold of The Washington Post dismissed it as "the latest uninspired attempt at juvenile comedy from the Disney studio".
