= Treasure of Matecumbe =

1976 film by Vincent McEveety

- Theatrical release poster
- Directed by: Vincent McEveety
- Written by: Don Tait
- Based on: A Journey to Matecumbe by Robert Lewis Taylor
- Produced by: Bill Anderson; Ron Miller
- Starring: Robert Foxworth; Joan Hackett; Peter Ustinov; Vic Morrow; Dick Van Patten
- Cinematography: Frank V. Phillips
- Edited by: Cotton Warburton
- Music by: Buddy Baker
- Production company: Walt Disney Productions
- Distributed by: Buena Vista Distribution
- Release date: July 1, 1976
- Running time: 115 minutes
- Country: United States
- Language: English

Treasure of Matecumbe is a 1976 American adventure Western film directed by Vincent McEveety and produced by Walt Disney Productions. It was based on the novel A Journey to Matecumbe by Robert Lewis Taylor. The filming locations were in Danville, Kentucky, Sacramento River at Colusa, California and Walt Disney Productions' Golden Oak Ranch in California. The final scene at a beached shipwreck was filmed at Walt Disney World's Discovery Island.

== Plot ==
In post-Civil War Kentucky, ex-slave Ben arrives at Grassy, the decaying plantation where young Davie Burnie, his aunts Effie and Lou, and young ex-slave Thad live. Ben reveals that Davie's father hid a treasure map in a book in the home. That night, Northern carpetbagger Captain Spangler and his men attack the plantation, but Effie helps the boys escape. Ben rips the map from the book and gives it to the boys before being shot and killed by Spangler.

The boys book cheap passage on a steamboat headed down the Mississippi River to New Orleans. They find stowaway Lauriette Paxton, a "runaway bride". She cheats a gambler out of $400 and a ring. One night, a thief steals Davie's wallet (which has his money and map). When Lauriette tries to stop him, he pushes her overboard. The boys jump into the river and save her. Lauriette trades her ring for a mule and cart and the trio make it to the next town. Lauriette turns the boys in as runaways, but they escape. Spangler hears of the jail break, and is back on the boys' trail.

Davie and Thad meet snake oil salesman Dr. Ewing Snodgrass, and join his show. In the next town, Lauriette sees the show. Spangler and his men also see the boys on stage, and Davie flees. Just as Spangler is about to push Davie over a cliff, Lauriette intervenes and drives him off with a gun. Lauriette and Dr. Snodgrass now realize that the boys' tale of a treasure map is true. Based on Davie's description of the map, Snodgrass embroiders a rough copy of the map onto a handkerchief.

Davie suggests they seek out his Uncle Jim, whose home is downriver at a place called Friar's Point. Using Snodgrass' boat, they arrive at Jim's home just as he is about to be lynched by the Ku Klux Klan for, or so their leader claims, interfering in the Klan's business. Taking one of the Klansmen's rifles, Davie shoots down the noose, while Thad and Dr. Snodgrass lob Molotov cocktails at the Klan, which drives them off. They continue downriver, and stop for the night with some rivermen. Lauriette's dancing proves too provocative for the rough men, and Jim rescues her from their advances. At the next landing, they are suddenly attacked by Spangler and his men, who have caught up to them aboard a small steamboat. Fleeing into the woods, Jim leads Spangler and his men off and is seemingly killed by Spangler's lieutenant, Catrell. Meanwhile, Snodgrass, Davie, Thad, and Lauriette double back and steal the steamboat, blowing up Snodgrass' keelboat to prevent pursuit.

In New Orleans, the foursome boards a train headed for Florida, but are spotted by Spangler's men. Reaching Tampa, Florida, the group hires a local guide, Cooter Skaggs to get them through the Everglades to Matecumbe. Skaggs betrays them and takes them to Spangler. Dr. Snodgrass turns his embroidered copy of the treasure map over to Spangler to save Davie's life. Spangler and his men abandon the group in the swamp and head for Matecumbe. Hours later, Davie and the others are surprised to see Uncle Jim arrive in a boat, guided by his Seminole friend, Charlie. The group uses Charlie's boat to head for the island and the treasure site even though Charlie says it is located in the territory of the dangerous "Cougar" tribe of Native Americans.

The group finds the buried treasure just as a hurricane hits. Snodgrass is swept out to sea by a giant wave. The others stumble into a Cougar burial ground, and take refuge in a chief's tomb. After the hurricane passes, the group finds and digs up the treasure. Davie and his friends are spotted by Spangler and his men, and flee. Davie and Thad lead Spangler into the burial ground just as a large number of Cougars arrive. Spangler and his men desecrate several graves and structures as they chase Davie and Thad. Stopping when they see the treasure chest, Spangler and his men are caught by the Cougars. The Native Americans, uninterested in the chest, take the villains off to be made into "squaws"---slaves for the rest of their lives.

Davie and his friends take the treasure and head back to the beach, where they find Dr. Snodgrass injured but alive. Jim and Lauriette, now in love, agree to move to Grassy with Davie and Thad, and Davie invites Dr. Snodgrass to come live with them.

== Cast ==
- Johnny Doran as Davie
- Billy Attmore as Thad
- Robert Foxworth as Uncle Jim
- Joan Hackett as Lauriette Paxton
- Peter Ustinov as Dr. Ewing T. Snodgrass
- Vic Morrow as Captain Spangler
- Jane Wyatt as Aunt Effie
- Virginia Vincent as Aunt Lou
- Robert DoQui as Ben
- Mills Watson as Catrell
- Don Knight as Cooter Skaggs
- Dub Taylor as Sheriff Forbes
- Dick Van Patten as The Gambler
- George Lindsey as Coahoma Sheriff
- John Myhers as Captain Boomer
- Logan Ramsey as Coley
- Valentin de Vargas as Charlie
- Jonathan Daly as Paxton Farrow
- Warde Donovan as Sheriff Coffey
- James Brodhead as Groom
- John Steadman as Guide
- Rex Holman as Informant
- Clint Ritchie as Flatboat Leader
- Ken Renard as Customer
- Brion James as Roustabout
- John Hayes as Mule Driver
- John C. Flinn III as Spangler's Men
- Louie Elias as Spangler's Men
- Richard Wright as Spangler's Men
- David S. Cass Sr. as Spangler's Men

== Music ==
The film's score was written by Buddy Baker. The film features one original song, "Matecumbe," written by Richard McKinley and Shane Tatum. The song was performed by Bahler, Olsson, Murray, and Haas and plays during the film's opening credits.

== Reception ==
Blogger Dean L. Jones wrote of the film, "An adventure saga influenced by elements from the fiction of Robert Louis Stevenson, Mark Twain, and others—then illustrates those elements through the nostalgic and memorable prism of the Walt Disney Productions house style—Treasure of Matecumbe is as wonderful a depiction of... whimsy and imagination. […], Treasure of Matecumbe includes murder, mystery and an exciting journey in the search of the treasure of Matecumbe [Key]."

Upon its release in 1976, The Treasure of Matacumbe premiered throughout the U.S. and was a moderate success. As of 2020, the motion picture has been available on Disney+.
