= The Ghost of Cypress Swamp =

1977 Disney television film

- Genre: Adventure
- Based on: Weakfoot by Linda Cline
- Written by: Harry Spalding
- Directed by: Vincent McEveety
- Starring: Vic Morrow; Shug Fisher; Jeff East
- Composer: Jimmie Haskell
- Country of origin: United States
- Original language: English

Production
- Executive producer: Ron W. Miller
- Production company: Walt Disney Productions

Original release
- Network: NBC
- Release: March 13, 1977

The Ghost of Cypress Swamp is a 1977 American television adventure film produced by Walt Disney Productions for The Wonderful World of Disney. Directed by Vincent McEveety, it originally aired on March 13, 1977 and is considered by Disney to be its first made for television film.

Based on Linda Cline's 1975 novel Weakfoot, the production featured music by Jimmie Haskell. The film was executive produced by Ron W. Miller and the teleplay was written by Harry Spalding.

Gavan O'Herlihy, known for playing Chuck Cunningham on Happy Days, appeared as Big Bob Landers.

Location filming took place at Caddo Lake on the Texas-Louisiana border.

Television listings described the film as the story of a 15-year-old boy who becomes lost in the Great Cypress Swamp and befriends a man who has hidden there for 16 years.

Reviews of the film appeared in outlets including El País, Chronique Disney and MonsterHunter.

== Cast ==
The cast includes:

- Vic Morrow as Tom Stone
- Shug Fisher as Sherman Prather
- Jeff East as Lonny Bascombe
- Gavan O'Herlihy as Big Bob Landers
- Tom Simcox as Pa Bascombe
- Jacqueline Scott as Aunt Louise
- Noah Beery Jr. as Doc Manners
- Louise Latham as Ma Landers
- James Van Patten as Bucky Landers
- Cindy Eilbacher as Shirley Landers
- Richard "Dub" Wright as Morton Landers
- James Almanzar as First Searcher
- Tom Waters as Second Searcher
