= Frank V. Phillips =

American cinematographer

Frank Phillips
- Born: Frank Van Tuyl Phillips; April 7, 1912; San Bernardino, California
- Died: April 12, 1994 (aged 82); Prescott, Arizona
- Occupation: Cinematographer
- Years active: 1957–1982

Frank Van Tuyl Phillips (April 7, 1912 – April 12, 1994) was an American cinematographer.

== Biography ==
He was born in 1912 in San Bernardino, California. He was a director of photography and Disney and MGM Studios. His credits at MGM as a camera operator include Singin' in the Rain and Giant. His Disney credits include Bedknobs and Broomsticks, Pete's Dragon, and Escape to Witch Mountain. He was nominated for an Academy Award for his work on The Black Hole. He also worked in television and received an Emmy nomination for his work on Hawaii Five-0.

In 1965, he was involved in a boating accident that killed Robert King Baggott, second cameraman, during the production of Lt. Robin Crusoe, USN (1966).

Phillips died in 1994 in Prescott, Arizona.

== Filmography ==
- Wild Wild Winter (1966)
- Mosby's Marauders (1967)
- The Young Loner (TV) (1968)
- Secrets of the Pirate's Inn (1969)
- The One and Only, Genuine, Original Family Band (1968)
- The Computer Wore Tennis Shoes (1969)
- Darker than Amber (1970)
- The Wild Country (1970)
- Scandalous John (1970)
- The Strange Monster of Strawberry Cove (1971)
- Bedknobs and Broomsticks (1971)
- Now You See Him, Now You Don't (1972)
- Snowball Express (1972)
- The World's Greatest Athlete (1973)
- Herbie Rides Again (1974)
- The Island at the Top of the World (1974)
- Escape to Witch Mountain (1975)
- The Apple Dumpling Gang (1975)
- No Deposit, No Return (1976)
- Treasure of Matecumbe (1976)
- Gus (1976)
- The Shaggy D.A. (1976)
- Pete's Dragon (1977)
- Return from Witch Mountain (1978)
- Hot Lead and Cold Feet (1978)
- Goin' Coconuts (1978)
- The Apple Dumpling Gang Rides Again (1979)
- The Black Hole (1979)
- Midnight Madness (1980)
- Herbie Goes Bananas (1980)
- Going Ape! (1981)
- Return of the Beverly Hillbillies (TV) (1981)
- The Ambush Murders (TV) (1982)
- Big Bird in China (TV) (1983) (uncredited)
