= The Black Hole (1979 film) =

1979 science fiction film by Gary Nelson

- Theatrical release poster
- Directed by: Gary Nelson
- Screenplay by: Gerry Day; Jeb Rosebrook
- Story by: Jeb Rosebrook; Bob Barbash; Richard Landau
- Produced by: Ron Miller
- Starring: Maximilian Schell; Robert Forster; Joseph Bottoms; Yvette Mimieux; Anthony Perkins; Ernest Borgnine
- Cinematography: Frank Phillips
- Edited by: Gregg McLaughlin
- Music by: John Barry
- Production company: Walt Disney Productions
- Distributed by: Buena Vista Distribution
- Release dates: December 18, 1979 (London); December 21, 1979 (United States)
- Running time: 98 minutes
- Country: United States
- Language: English
- Budget: $20 million
- Box office: $35.8 million (domestic)

The Black Hole is a 1979 American science fiction film directed by Gary Nelson and produced by Walt Disney Productions. The film stars Maximilian Schell, Robert Forster, Joseph Bottoms, Yvette Mimieux, Anthony Perkins and Ernest Borgnine, while the voices of the main robot characters are provided by Roddy McDowall and Slim Pickens (both uncredited). The music for the film was composed by John Barry. With a production budget of $20 million, plus another $6 million for advertising, it was at the time the most expensive picture ever produced by Disney.

In the early 1970s, the film was initially conceived as a space-themed disaster film. However, the script went through numerous iterations from various screenwriters. Disney's effects department used novel computerized camera technology to create the visual effects. The film premiered on December 18, 1979, in London in the United Kingdom and on December 21, 1979, in the United States. It was the first film from Walt Disney Productions to receive a PG rating. The film received mixed reviews from film critics and grossed $35 million at the US box office. The film was nominated for two Academy Awards, for Best Cinematography and Best Visual Effects.

== Plot ==
In the year 2130, 547 days into its voyage, the spacecraft USS Palomino has nearly completed its mission exploring deep space. The crew consists of Captain Dan Holland, First Officer Lieutenant Charlie Pizer, journalist Harry Booth, ESP-sensitive scientist Dr. Kate McCrae, the expedition's civilian leader Dr. Alex Durant and the diminutive robot V.I.N.CENT. ("Vital Information Necessary CENTralized").

As it is returning to Earth, the Palomino discovers a black hole with the long-lost and apparently abandoned USS Cygnus nearby, the same ship that McCrae's father was aboard when it vanished 20 years prior. The Palomino decides to investigate and finds that there is a mysterious null gravity field surrounding the Cygnus that allows it to defy the massive gravitational pull of the black hole. The Palomino briefly strays outside the field and is damaged by the intense gravity, forcing it to emergency dock with the Cygnus, which no longer appears abandoned.

The cautious Palomino crew soon encounter Dr. Hans Reinhardt (one of Earth's most brilliant scientists, according to Durant). Reinhardt explains he has been alone on the Cygnus since it encountered a meteor field and was disabled. He ordered the human crew to return to Earth without him, but McCrae's father chose to remain aboard and has since died. To replace the crew, Reinhardt built faceless, black-robed drones, sentry robots and his sinister bodyguard robot, Maximilian. Reinhardt says he intends to fly the Cygnus through the black hole because 20 years of study has shown that it is possible. Only an enamoured Durant believes him and asks if he can accompany Reinhardt.

However, the rest of the Palomino crew start to become suspicious of Reinhardt. Booth sees a drone limping, while Holland witnesses an android funeral and discovers personal items in the Cygnus crew quarters. V.I.N.CENT. meets a battered earlier model of his type named BO.B. ("BiO-sanitation Battalion"). BO.B explains the drones are actually what is left of the human crew, who mutinied when Reinhardt refused to return to Earth after the Cygnus was damaged. McCrae's father was killed leading the mutiny, and the crew was lobotomized and "reprogrammed" to serve Reinhardt. V.I.N.CENT. uses telepathy to tell McCrae. After she informs Durant what really happened, he removes a drone's faceplate, revealing the zombie-like face of a crew member. Durant tries to flee with McCrae, but is killed by Maximilian.

Reinhardt orders his robots to lobotomize McCrae, but just as the process begins, she is rescued by Holland, V.I.N.CENT. and BO.B. Harry Booth tries to escape alone in the Palomino, but is shot down and fatally crashes into the Cygnus. A subsequent meteor storm and the explosion of the ship's overstressed main power plant cause the anti-gravity generator to fail. Without its null-gravity bubble, the Cygnus quickly starts to break apart under the black hole's huge gravitational forces.

Reinhardt and the Palomino survivors separately plan their escape in the probe ship used to study the black hole. Reinhardt orders Maximilian to prepare the ship for launch, but then a large viewscreen falls on Reinhardt, pinning him to the deck. His cries for help are not acknowledged by the lobotimized crew nor Maximilian, who enters the elevator as his master calls for him and pursues the Palomino crew as they attempt to escape.

The crew nears the probe ship before being confronted again by Maximilian. He fatally damages BO.B. before battling with V.I.N.CENT. as McCrae, Holland and Pizer continue to the probe. V.I.N.CENT. defeats his opponent by drilling into Maximilian's armor, disabling his system and sending him hurtling into the black hole. Holland, Pizer, McCrae and V.I.N.CENT. launch the probe, which they soon realize has a pre-programmed flight path, taking them directly into the black hole.

Within the black hole, the Cygnus completely breaks apart. The drifting Reinhardt and Maximilian merge above a burning, hellish landscape populated by dark-robed specters resembling Cygnus drones. Meanwhile, the probe ship is led through a cathedral-like arched crystal tunnel by a floating, angelic figure. After the ship emerges from a white hole, Holland, Pizer, McCrae and V.I.N.CENT. fly towards a planet near a bright star.

== Cast ==
- Maximilian Schell as Dr. Hans Reinhardt
- Anthony Perkins as Dr. Alex Durant
- Robert Forster as Captain Dan Holland
- Joseph Bottoms as Lieutenant Charlie Pizer
- Yvette Mimieux as Dr. Kate McCrae
- Ernest Borgnine as Harry Booth
- Tom McLoughlin as Captain S.T.A.R. (Captain Special Troops/Arms Regiment)
- Roddy McDowall as the voice of V.I.N.CENT. LF-396 (Vital Information Necessary CENTralized Labor Force-396) (uncredited)
- Slim Pickens as the voice of Old BO.B. LF-28 (Old BiO-sanitation Battalion Labor Force-28) (uncredited)

Director Gary Nelson makes a brief, uncredited cameo as the drone who has his faceplate removed by Dr. Durant.

== Production ==
=== Development ===
In the wake of several successful disaster films such as The Poseidon Adventure (1972) and The Towering Inferno (1974), writers Bob Barbash and Richard Landau approached Disney Studios executive story editor Frank Paris with the idea for a space-themed disaster film tentatively titled Space Station One. The writers showed Paris a preliminary sketch of their idea, and the idea was later pitched to Ron Miller, who assigned longtime studio producer Winston Hibler to help develop the project. An idea of Hibler's was for a black hole to be featured in the story. After nearly a year of work on the project, Hibler was not satisfied with the later story drafts, so William Wood was added to rework the script. Ultimately, Hibler retired from the Disney studios. The project was later shelved until late 1975 when development resumed on the project now re-titled Space Probe One. In 1976, Hibler returned from retirement, and suggested to Miller to hire conceptual artist Robert McCall to create some pre-production visuals to help focus the story and explore some possible ideas.

Hibler also brought matte designer Peter Ellenshaw out of retirement to create conceptual designs on the proposed film.

=== Writing ===
Four months later, director John Hough, who had just directed Escape to Witch Mountain (1975), was approached to direct the film. Although he liked the premise, he felt the script needed more revisions, so he brought in Sumner Arthur Long for an additional rewrite. However, by summer 1976, the production team was still unsatisfied with the script, and audiences' interest in the disaster genre was steadily declining.

Hibler died in August 1976, but with the level of work already invested in the project, Miller took over the project. In October, writer Ed Coffey was added to rewrite the script. By February 1977, Jeb Rosebrook was included to restructure the story, in which the script was then changed to focus on a small core group of astronauts who would encounter a black hole, which was a phenomenon that had been a growing discussion within the scientific community.

While the script was again being rewritten, Hough left the project and decided to direct Brass Target (1978). In December 1977, Miller then approached Gary Nelson, who had just been nominated for a Primetime Emmy on the political miniseries Washington: Behind Closed Doors, to direct the project. Nelson read a draft of the script and declined the offer. However, he was called back to the studio, and after observing the miniatures and matte paintings created by Ellenshaw, he agreed to direct.

Rosebrook finished his final draft in March 1978, but because Disney was still displeased with the script, Gerry Day was hired for some script doctoring. After scientific research headed by marketing director Martin Rabinovitch, the title The Black Hole was selected to convey the power and mystique of the film.

=== Casting ===
Nelson initially considered casting Sigourney Weaver in the role of Kate McCrae, but the head of the casting department balked at the actress's unusual name and rejected her. By October 1978, most of the actors had been cast, with the exception for Jennifer O'Neill cast as Kate McCrae. O'Neill had been told she needed to cut her hair because it would be easier to film zero-gravity scenes. Initially hesitant, she eventually agreed and brought her personal hairstylist Vidal Sassoon to the studio. O'Neill consumed multiple glasses of wine during the haircut, then left the studio noticeably inebriated and was subsequently hospitalized following a car crash, which cost her the role. Yvette Mimieux was cast the following day and agreed to have her own long hair cropped.

=== Filming ===
Filming took place between October 11, 1978, and April 20, 1979.

=== Special effects ===
Although Star Wars (1977) had revolutionized the use of computerized motion control miniature special effects, The Black Hole was shot using a blend of traditional camera techniques and newly developed computer-controlled camera technology. Disney wanted to rent equipment from Star Wars' effect studio Industrial Light & Magic, but it was unavailable during the film's production period and was prohibitively expensive. In the end, Disney turned to its own engineering department, which created the ACES (Automated Camera Effects System). The computerized system allowed the camera to take double exposure photographs of the miniature models as it moves convincingly across the matte painting. It also permitted the actors to move unrestrictedly within a matte painting while the camera tracks them within a non-existent set that would be painted in later. The Mattescan system was then used to composite live-action shots onto a single matte painting while the camera is in motion on several axes. In total, 150 matte paintings were created for the film under the supervision of Harrison Ellenshaw, but only 13 were used in the film.

With a production budget of $20 million, plus another $6 million for advertising, The Black Hole was at the time the most expensive picture ever produced by Disney.

=== Soundtrack ===
In April 1979, Disney hired John Barry, best known as the composer for the James Bond films, to compose the film's score. It was the first film score ever to be recorded digitally.

An album of highlights from the score was released on LP by Disneyland Records in 1979. The 1979 album master was made available digitally on iTunes in 2007. On August 23, 2011, Intrada Records released the complete score on compact disc. The release overcame many technical hurdles, because the format the score was recorded on, the 32-track 3M Digital Recorder, was both obscure and obsolete.

== Release ==
The Black Hole premiered at the Odeon Leicester Square in London on December 18, 1979, before opening to the public the following day. It was then released in the United States on December 21, 1979. Along with Star Trek: The Motion Picture, released earlier the same month, The Black Hole was one of the last mainstream Hollywood films to have an overture at the start of the film. Although this was cut on subsequent television airings, the overture is included on Disney's 2004 DVD release, the film's 2019 Blu-ray release and streaming release on Disney+.

The Black Hole is notable for being the first Disney film to earn a PG rating because of the frequent use of "hell" and "damn" and the violent death of Dr. Alex Durant. Buena Vista Distribution had released the PG-rated sports drama film Take Down earlier the same year, but it was produced by an independent production studio. The version of the film broadcast on the Disney Channel was edited for language, with all uses of the words "damn" and "hell" removed. The film also features some subtext and metaphysical and religious themes that reflected the company's interest in developing more adult-oriented and mainstream films. This trend eventually led the studio to create its Touchstone Pictures label, under which films considered too mature for the Walt Disney label could be released. Nelson had made the decision to omit the Disney logo for the film and use "Buena Vista Productions" instead.

The film had a record opening weekend for Disney with a gross of $4,738,000 from 889 theatres. During its theatrical release, the movie grossed $35.8 million in the United States and Canada, from which it returned $25 million in box office rentals.

=== Marketing ===
Coinciding with the film's release, Alan Dean Foster wrote a novelization based on the film. In a retrospective interview, Foster remarked that his novelization had to rationalize the scientific inaccuracies depicted in the film; the novelization also changes the outcome: the probe ship is destroyed, but the three humans and robot merge and become, aided by Kate McRae's psychic abilities, non-substantial beings that retain their separate identities while becoming one: "They were themselves ... and yet somehow strange and new, a galactic sea change that produced all of the above and a new unified mindthing that was KateCharlieDanVincent also." Around the same time, Disney used their comic strip Walt Disney's Treasury of Classic Tales to promote their latest film releases. Comic book artist Mike Royer suggested fellow artist Jack Kirby draw a comic strip adaptation of the film, and Kirby accepted. The comic strip adaptation, which ran for twenty-six weeks, was scripted by Carl Fallberg with the inking done by Royer.

A separate comic book adaptation of the film published by Whitman Comics in 1980 bypasses the whole issue of what happens inside the black hole by having the crew enter the black hole on one page and emerge apparently unharmed on the next page into a parallel universe where they encounter alternate versions of Reinhardt, BO.B., Maximilian and even Frank McCrae, Kate McCrae's father. Four issues were published. The first two issues adapted the film and the second two issues continued the story introducing a race of people called Virlights, whom they end up aiding against a rising tyrant. The rare fourth issue concludes with the promise of a fifth issue but the series was canceled before it was released. In Mexico, Editorial Novaro S.A. published the first four Whitman issues, including the fifth issue, but also released a sixth issue before the series ended. Other comic adaptations released in Europe have the crew emerging into another galaxy, thus confirming Reinhardt's theories. While wondering if they will ever return to Earth, they decide to explore this new universe.

In the official Disney Read-Along recording and illustrated story book, the crew in the probe ship emerge safely on the other side of the black hole, while the Cygnus is "crushed like an eggshell." The story ends with Captain Holland saying, "We've been trained to find new worlds. Let's go find one for ourselves!" The children's book line, Little Golden Books, released a book entitled The Black Hole: A Spaceship Adventure for Robots. The story involves V.I.N.CENT. and BO.B. exploring the Cygnus, visiting its gardens, encountering the "humanoid robots", and escaping detection by Maximilian.

The Mego Corporation produced 6 million action figures from the film, released in the fall of 1979. Nabisco issued a series of plastic pencil holders in the shape of the film's robot characters via specially marked boxes of breakfast cereal.

In 1983, Disney put out a computer learning-game spinoff, Space Probe: Math. This was a cassette containing two educational games designed for use with the Radio Shack TRS-80 Color Computer. The concept of the first game was that the Palomino had landed on an infected planet, Delta 5 Omega. All the crew were falling under "mind diffusion", basically a viral form of fatigue. The player (aged 7–14) had to solve multiplication or division problems to save the crew. In the second game, the player had to save a primitive world's crops, using (rectangular) area and perimeter problems.

=== Home media ===
In March 1980, Disney began a partnership with Fotomat Corporation in a four-city market test to make 13 selected titles available for rental on videocassette, which was to be expanded nationwide by the end of the year. In September 1980, The Black Hole was made available for purchase or rental on videocassette. In 1982, Disney announced it had partnered with RCA to release nine of their films on the CED videodisc format, of which The Black Hole was re-released in the following year.

On March 30, 1999, Anchor Bay Entertainment re-released the film on three separate VHS editions: Anniversary Edition, Collector's Edition, and Limited Edition as well as on DVD. The Limited Edition VHS was contained in a collectible tin box and accompanied with nine lobby cards, a 48-page booklet about the making of the film (featuring an interview with director Gary Nelson), and a script of an abandoned alternate ending. On August 3, 2004, and May 2, 2010, Disney re-released the film on DVD that was presented in its original widescreen aspect ratio. Its bonus features included the extended theatrical trailer and a making-of featurette about the film's visual effects.

The film was released by Walt Disney Studios Home Entertainment on Blu-ray for the first time on August 13, 2019, as a Disney Movie Club exclusive. None of the special features on previous home video releases were included. The original August 13, 2019, mistakenly omitted the opening overture. Later, on October 14, a corrected version containing the overture was released.

The film became available to stream on Disney+ when the service launched on November 12, 2019.

== Reception and legacy ==
On the review aggregator website Rotten Tomatoes, the film has an approval rating of 44% based on 39 reviews. The site's consensus states: "While lavishly crafted and brimming with ambitious ideas, The Black Hole probes the depths of space with an unexciting story and hokey melodrama." Metacritic, which uses a weighted average, assigned the film a score of 52 out of 100, based on 12 critics, indicating "mixed or average" reviews.

Roger Ebert of the Chicago Sun-Times gave the film two stars out of four upon its release, saying it "takes us all the way to the rim of space only to bog us down in a talky melodrama whipped up out of mad scientists and haunted houses." Janet Maslin, reviewing the film for The New York Times, wrote that the film "is attractively unpretentious and at times quite snappy—among the more sensational stunts is a shot of a huge, molten meteor rolling towards a crew of tiny people, who appear to be right in its path. Its story, about a band of explorers and a wicked space tyrant who pretends to be nice, has a comic-book feeling. But as comic books go, this one is pretty much a page-turner." Gene Siskel of The Chicago Tribune found the film to be "dull" and claims "it takes much too long to get its less than grand finale". While he praised the film's special effects, he was critical of the film's cast, claiming they were "dead stars in their own right. If actors get paid to express emotions, then the cast in The Black Hole doesn't even deserve the minimum wage."

Richard Schickel of Time acknowledged that the "overpowering score, squads of menacing heavies, and, especially, two adorable robots—are straight Star Wars steals, and because, despite all this sincere flattery and a script and performances that are merely adequate, the fool thing works." He later praised the visual effects and miniature designs as an "amusing mixture of the plush and technological" concluding that it is "good to see the Disney craftsmen doing what they do best on such a grand and risky scale." Reviewing the film in Ares Magazine, Vincent Misiano commented that "In the final analysis, The Black Hole is similar to its natural namesake. Nothing can escape from it either. Not a glimmer of imagination or inspiration. Perhaps if Pluto and Mickey hadn't been involved ...". In Imagine magazine, Colin Greenland stated that "Even more awesome than the special effects is the stupidity of the script; and the cute robots will have you reaching for a tin-opener."

Science fiction historian John Clute dismissed The Black Hole as "a silly concoction" where "the story disappears down the hole". Phil Hardy, writing in The Aurum Film Encyclopedia, also gave the film a negative review, saying The Black Hole featured "the most heavy-handed dialogue imaginable" and added that the film's climax "has no dramatic power at all". Author John Kenneth Muir wrote an extensive review of the film that delved into some of the nuances and metaphysical ideas which marked The Black Hole as more adult-oriented fare than Disney had previously been involved with. In 2014, astrophysicist Neil deGrasse Tyson deemed the film to be the least scientifically accurate movie of all time. Criticizing the film, he noted, "They not only got none of the physics right about falling into a black hole, had they gotten it right it would have been a vastly more interesting movie."

The story has been compared to Twenty Thousand Leagues Under the Seas, albeit in space.

Since the film's release, The Black Hole has become a minor cult classic among science fiction film fans.

=== Awards and nominations ===
Award	Category	Nominee(s)	Result	Ref.
Academy Awards	Best Cinematography	Frank V. Phillips	Nominated	
Academy Awards	Best Visual Effects	Peter Ellenshaw, Art Cruickshank, Eustace Lycett, Danny Lee, Harrison Ellenshaw, and Joe Hale	Nominated	
Hugo Awards	Best Dramatic Presentation	Gary Nelson, Jeb Rosebrook, Gerry Day, Bob Barbash, and Richard H. Landau	Nominated	
International Film Music Critics Association Awards	Best Archival Release of an Existing Score	John Barry, Randy Thornton, Douglass Fake, Jeff Bond, and Steve Sterling	Nominated	
Saturn Awards	Best Science Fiction Film		Nominated	
Saturn Awards	Best Writing	Gerry Day and Jeb Rosebrook	Nominated	
Saturn Awards	Best Music	John Barry	Nominated	
Saturn Awards	Best Special Effects	Peter Ellenshaw	Nominated	
Stinkers Bad Movie Awards	Most Annoying Non-Human Character	Old BO.B. LF-28 (voice by Slim Pickens)	Nominated	
Stinkers Bad Movie Awards	Most Annoying Non-Human Character	V.I.N.CENT. LF-396 (voice by Roddy McDowall)	Nominated	

== Possible remake ==
In November 2009, it was reported that Disney had plans to remake The Black Hole. Director Joseph Kosinski, who also directed Disney's Tron: Legacy (2010), and producer Sean Bailey were attached to the production.

By April 2013, Jon Spaihts, who wrote the script for the Alien prequel Prometheus (2012), had signed on as screenwriter.

In 2016, it was announced that the remake was put on hold because Spaihts's script was considered "too dark for a Disney movie". Spaihts commented:

Black Hole was an amazing experience. That was one of those movies I was stuck on until I cracked the beginning, and suddenly it just started to flow. I loved that script. It sits uneasily in Disney's world as a dark epic, and Disney is in a very colorful place. They already have multiple big space epics going, so I don't know how or whether it'll find its way to light of day, but I sure wrote a heck of a movie and was thrilled to do it. It was very faithful to the original but clever in all the ways in that first film was silly, I hope.

In March 2018, it was reported that Emily Carmichael would be writing the screenplay.

In June 2022, Kosinski revealed that the project was initially cancelled due to having numerous similarities to Christopher Nolan's Interstellar (2014). However, he expressed hope at reviving it in the future.
