= Scandalous John =

1971 film directed by Robert Butler

- 1971 Theatrical Poster
- Directed by: Robert Butler
- Written by: Bill Walsh; Don DaGradi
- Produced by: Bill Walsh
- Starring: Brian Keith; Alfonso Arau; Michele Carey
- Cinematography: Frank V. Phillips
- Edited by: Cotton Warburton
- Music by: Rod McKuen
- Production company: Walt Disney Productions
- Distributed by: Buena Vista Distribution
- Release date: June 22, 1971
- Running time: 114 minutes
- Country: United States
- Language: English

Scandalous John is a 1971 American Western comedy-drama film directed by Robert Butler and produced by Walt Disney Productions. It stars Brian Keith and Alfonso Arau. The music was scored by Rod McKuen.

== Plot ==
John McCanless is a rip-snorting, 79-year-old western rancher, together with the prettiest granddaughter; ugliest horse; scrawniest herd; and puniest partner, a Mexican handyman, go on a cattle drive (of one cow) and do battle against a wealthy, land-grabbing industrialist. After an adventurous (and humorous) trek, à la Don Quixote, the rancher confronts the villain in a shootout that parallels the classic struggle of good and evil in the Old West.

== Cast ==
- Brian Keith as John McCanless
- Alfonso Arau as Paco
- Michele Carey as Amanda McCanless
- Rick Lenz as Jimmy Whittaker
- Harry Morgan as Sheriff Pippen
- Simon Oakland as Barton Whittaker
- Bill Williams as Sheriff Hart
- Christopher Dark as Card Dealer
- Fran Ryan as Farm Woman
- Bruce Glover as Sludge
- Richard Hale as Old Indian
- Jimmy Lydon as Grotch
- John Ritter as Wendell
- Iris Adrian as Mavis
- Larry D. Mann as Bartender
- Jack Raine as Switchman
- Booth Colman as Governor Murray
- Edward Faulkner as Hillary
- Bill Zuckert as Abernathy
- John Zaremba as Wales
- Robert Padilla as Paco's Cousin
- Alex Tinne as Clerk
- Benny Baker as Dr. Kropak
- Paul Koslo as Pipes
- William O'Connell as Men's Store Clerk
- Sam Edwards as Bald Man
- Leone Stevens as Girl
- José Nieto as Mariachi Band
- Joseph Gutierrez as Mariachi Band
- Freddie Hernandez as Mariachi Band
- Sondra Currie as Saloon Girl

== Music ==
The film's score was written by Rod McKuen. The film features one original song. "Pastures Green" was written and performed by Rod McKuen as John McCanless and Paco continue their cow drive through the Old West tourist town of Warbag. The song is reprised over the film's end credits.
