= Richard Wormser =

American writer (1908–1977)

- Born: Richard Edward Wormser; February 2, 1908; New York City, New York
- Writing career
- Pen name: Ed Friend

Richard Edward Wormser (February 2, 1908, in New York City, New York – July, c. 1977 in Tumacaciori, Arizona) was an American writer of pulp fiction, detective fiction, screenplays, and Westerns, some of it written using the pseudonym of Ed Friend. He is estimated to have written 300 short stories, 200 novelettes, 12 books, many screenplays, and stories turned into screenplays, and a cookbook: Southwest Cookery or At Home on the Range.

== Literary accomplishments ==
After graduating from Princeton University he became a prolific writer of pulp fiction under his own name, the pen name of Conrad Gerson, and wrote seventeen Nick Carter novels for Street & Smith.

Wormser's first crime fiction novel was The Man with the Wax Face in 1934. His first Western novel was The Lonesome Quarter in 1951.

Hollywood purchased several of his stories beginning with his It's All in the Racket filmed as Sworn Enemy in 1936. Columbia Pictures signed him for a short term writing contract in 1937. He was fired, then rehired by Columbia and worked for several other studios. Columbia once could not make up its mind between buying two of his stories, The Frame Up or Right Guy. The studio at last decided on Right Guy but filmed it under the title of The Frame-Up.

In 1969, his book Ride a Northbound Horse was made into a television film of the same name for Walt Disney's Wonderful World of Color. It starred Carroll O’Connor, Jack Elam, Ted Gehring, Mills Watson, and Dub Taylor.

During World War II he served as a forest ranger.

Wormser won Western Spur Awards for juvenile fiction for Ride a Northbound Horse in 1964, and for The Black Mustanger in 1971. He also won an Edgar award for Best Paperback Original Novel for The Invader in 1973.

== Novels ==
- The Man With the Wax Face, 1934
- The Communist’s Corpse, 1935
- All's Fair, 1937
- The Hanging Heiress, 1949
- The Lonesome Quarter, 1952 (western)
- The Longhorn Trail, 1955 (western)
- The Body Looks Familiar, 1958
- Slattery's Range, 1959 (western)
- The Late Mrs Five, 1960
- Drive East On 66, 1961
- Battalion of Saints, 1961 (western)
- Perfect Pigeon, 1962
- Three-Cornered War, 1962 (western)
- A Nice Girl Like You, 1963
- Pan Satyrus, 1963
- Ride a Northbound Horse, 1964 (western)
- The Green Hornet: The Infernal Light, 1966 (as Ed Friend)
- The Most Deadly Game #1: The Corpse in the Castle, 1970 (as Ed Friend)
- The Ranch by the Sea, 1970
- Black Mustanger, 1971 (western)
- The Takeover, 1971
- The Invader, 1972

== Movie and TV tie-ins ==
Wormser authored a number of screenplay novelizations:

- Thief of Baghdad, 1961
- The Last Days of Sodom and Gomorrah, 1962
- McLintock, 1963
- Bedtime Story, 1964
- Operation Crossbow, 1965
- Major Dundee, 1965
- Alvarez Kelly, 1966
- Torn Curtain, 1966
- The Scalphunters, 1968

and four novels based on TV series,
three as "Ed Friend":

- The Green Hornet: The Infernal Light, 1967, adaptation (Dell)
- The High Chaparral: Coyote Gold, 1969, original (Tempo)
- The Most Deadly Game: The Corpse in the Castle, 1970, original (Lancer)

and one as Richard Wormser:

- The Wild Wild West, 1966, adaptation (Signet)
