= Wylly =

Wylly can be a surname or a given name. Notable people with the name include:

== Surname ==
- Guy Wylly (1880–1962), British Indian Army officer and Victoria Cross recipient
- H. C. Wylly (1858–1932), British Army officer and military historian

== Given name ==
- Wylly Folk St. John (1908-1985), American writer

== See also ==
- Willy
- Wyly
