= Emile Kuri =

American set decorator (1907–2000)

- Born: June 11, 1907; Cuernavaca, Morelos, Mexico
- Died: October 10, 2000 (aged 93); Los Angeles, California, United States
- Occupation: Set decorator
- Years active: 1938–1972

Emile Kuri (June 11, 1907 – October 10, 2000) was a Mexican-born American set decorator of Lebanese parentage. He won two Academy Awards and was nominated for six more in the category Best Art Direction. He was born in Cuernavaca, Morelos, Mexico, and died in Los Angeles, California, United States.

== Selected filmography ==
Kuri won two Academy Awards for Best Art Direction and was nominated for six more:

Won

- The Heiress (1949)
- 20,000 Leagues Under the Sea (1954)

Nominated

- Silver Queen (1942)
- Carrie (1952)
- Executive Suite (1954)
- The Absent-Minded Professor (1961)
- Mary Poppins (1964)
- Bedknobs and Broomsticks (1971)

== Other films ==
- It's A Wonderful Life (1946)
- Rope (1948)
- Ride a Northbound Horse (1969)
- My Dog, the Thief (1969)
- Secrets of the Pirate's Inn (1969)
- Menace on the Mountain (1970)
- The Wacky Zoo of Morgan City (1970)
- Bayou Boy (1971)
- The Strange Monster of Strawberry Cove (1971)
