= Secrets of the Pirate's Inn =

1969 Disney television film

- Genre: Mystery
- Based on: The Secrets of the Pirate Inn by Wylly Folk St. John
- Directed by: Gary Nelson
- Starring: Ed Begley; Bill Zuckert; Paul Fix
- Country of origin: United States
- Original language: English

Production
- Producer: Ron W. Miller
- Cinematography: Frank V. Phillips
- Editor: Cotton Warburton
- Production company: Walt Disney Productions

Original release
- Network: NBC
- Release: November 23 – November 30, 1969

Related
- The Strange Monster of Strawberry Cove (1971)

Secrets of the Pirate's Inn is a 1969 American television film produced by Walt Disney Productions, based on the 1968 children's novel The Secrets of the Pirate Inn by Wylly Folk St. John.

Directed by Gary Nelson, it originally aired in two parts on NBC's The Wonderful World of Disney on November 23 and November 30, 1969.

The film was produced by Ron W. Miller, co-produced by Tom Leetch, cinematography by Frank V. Phillips, art direction by John B. Mansbridge, edited by Cotton Warburton, set decoration by Emile Kuri and Hal Gausman, and sound by Robert O. Cook.

Production materials for the film are preserved in the University of Wyoming's American Heritage Center as part of the Ed Begley papers. The collection includes two drafts each of Parts I and II, written by Herman Groves and dated 1968–1969; one draft of each part contains handwritten annotations.

St. John was a children's author whose mystery novels were generally set in the American South, much like The Secrets of the Pirate Inn. Upon release, press covered Disney's adaptation of the book. St. John's younger brother Johnny Folk had worked as a cartoonist for Walt Disney.

Annie McEveety, who portrayed Tippy Durden in the film, was the daughter of longtime Disney employee Joe McEveety.

== Plot ==
The story is set in Louisiana and follows Dennis McCarthy, who befriends three children and recruits them to help search for treasure associated with the pirate Jean Lafitte. Their search is complicated by an unscrupulous newspaper reporter who is also pursuing the treasure and takes it from them after they find it.

== Sequel ==
Because it was Disney's highest rated film of the season, Vice President and Executive Producer Ron W. Miller asked for a sequel with the main cast in another mystery.

Disney followed Secrets of the Pirate's Inn with the 1971 television film The Strange Monster of Strawberry Cove, based on a story by Bertrand R. Brinley. Bill Zuckert returned as Sheriff Wiley, and Annie McEveety, Jimmy Bracken and Patrick Creamer also reprised their roles from Secrets of the Pirate's Inn.

== Cast ==
The cast includes:

- Ed Begley as Dennis McCarthy
- Bill Zuckert as Sheriff Frank Wiley
- Paul Fix as Vern Padgett
- Charles Aidman as Carl Buchanan
- Fredd Wayne as Jim Durden
- Anne Whitfield as Margaret Durden
- Grady Michael Smith as the Catcher at the softball game
- Annie McEveety as Tippy Durden
- Jimmy Bracken as Scott Durden
- Patrick Creamer as Wilbur "Catfish" Jones
- Tramp the Dog
