= Eric Shea =

American actor (born 1960)

- Born: February 14, 1960 (age 66); Los Angeles County, California, U.S.
- Occupation: Actor
- Years active: 1966–2007
- Relatives: Stephen and Christopher (brothers)

Eric Shea (born February 14, 1960) is an American former child actor. Active from age six through seventeen, he is best known for his roles in the feature films Yours, Mine and Ours (1968), Smile (1975), and The Poseidon Adventure (1972), as well as his numerous guest-starring appearances throughout the 1960s and 1970s on various television series, including Batman, Gunsmoke, The Flying Nun, Nanny and the Professor, The Brady Bunch, and Little House on the Prairie.

Shea's brothers Christopher and Stephen Shea each voiced Linus van Pelt for the Peanuts TV animation specials in the 1960s and 1970s, respectively.

== Filmography ==
Film
Year	Film	Role	Notes
1968	Yours, Mine and Ours	Phillip North	
1969	Gaily, Gaily	Younger Brother	
1972	The Poseidon Adventure	Robin Shelby	
1973	Alvin the Magnificent		TV movie
1973	Ace Eli and Rodger of the Skies	Rodger Walford	
1974	Houston, We've Got a Problem	Mikey "Mike" Matthews	TV movie
1974	Bobby Parker and Company	Bobby (9 year old)	TV movie
1974	The Castaway Cowboy	Booton "Little Maca" MacAvoy	
1975	The Secret of the Pond	Joey	TV movie
1975	Smile	Little Bob Freelander	
1978	When Every Day Was the Fourth of July	Red Doyle	TV movie
Television
Year	Television	Role	Notes
1972	Anna and the King	Louis Owens	
1976–77	Mary Hartman, Mary Hartman	Little Garth	
Guest Appearances
Year	Title	Role	Episodes
1966	Felony Squad	Mike Bradley	"A Date with Terror"
1966	Batman	Andy	"Come Back, Shame"
1966	Batman	Andy	"It's How You Play the Game"
1967	Gunsmoke	Billy Madison	"Stranger in Town"
1968	Gunsmoke	Mike Jarvis	"The Money Store"
1968	Here Come the Brides	Thorne	"And Jason Makes Five"
1969	Gunsmoke	Timmy Decker	"The Intruder"
1970	The Flying Nun	Joey	"The Dumbest Kid in School"
1970	Disneyland	Mark McIver	Menace on the Mountain, Parts 1 & 2 (co-starring Jodie Foster)
1970	Nanny and the Professor	Franklin	"The Human Element"
1971	Nanny and the Professor	Rodney	"The Human Fly"
1972	The Brady Bunch	Tommy Jamison	"Cindy Brady, Lady"
1973	Room 222	Tim	"Someone Special"
1974	Emergency!	Clyde	"The Hard Hours"
1974	Emergency!	Danny Freeman	"I'll Fix It"
1974	Disneyland	Alvin Fernald	The Whiz Kid and the Mystery at Riverton, Parts 1 & 2
1974	Adam-12	Gary Rogers	"Teamwork"
1974	Adam-12	Donnie	"Lady Beware"
1975	Shazam!	Corky	"On Winning"
1976	Disneyland	Alvin Fernald	The Whiz Kid and the Carnival Caper, Parts 1 & 2
1976	Little House on the Prairie	Jason	"The Talking Machine"
1976	Little House on the Prairie	Jason	"Bunny"
2006	Inside Edition	Himself	Episode dated 11 May 2006

== Bibliography ==
- Holmstrom, John. The Moving Picture Boy: An International Encyclopaedia from 1895 to 1995. Norwich, Michael Russell, 1996, p. 331.
