= The Strange Monster of Strawberry Cove =

1971 Disney television film

- Genre: Mystery
- Based on: "The Strange Sea Monster of Strawberry Lake" by Bertrand R. Brinley
- Directed by: Jack Shea
- Starring: Burgess Meredith; Agnes Moorehead; Bill Zuckert
- Composer: George Bruns
- Country of origin: United States
- Original language: English

Production
- Producer: Ron W. Miller
- Cinematography: Frank V. Phillips
- Production company: Walt Disney Productions

Original release
- Network: NBC
- Release: October 31 – November 7, 1971

Related
- Secrets of the Pirate's Inn (1969)

The Strange Monster of Strawberry Cove is a 1971 American television film produced by Walt Disney Productions. Directed by Jack Shea, it originally aired in two parts on NBC's The Wonderful World of Disney on October 31 and November 7, 1971.

The film was based on Bertrand R. Brinley's story "The Strange Sea Monster of Strawberry Lake", which was originally published in the September 1961 issue of Boys' Life and later included in the 1965 book The Mad Scientists' Club.

The film was produced by Ron W. Miller, co-produced by Tom Leetch, cinematography by Frank V. Phillips, art direction by John B. Mansbridge and William J. Creber, set decoration by Emile Kuri and Frank R. McKelvy, music by George Bruns, and sound by Robert O. Cook.

The Strange Monster of Strawberry Cove was a follow-up to the 1969 Disney television film Secrets of the Pirate's Inn. Bill Zuckert returned as Sheriff Wiley, while Annie McEveety, Jimmy Bracken and Patrick Creamer reprised their roles as Tippy, Scott and Catfish.

According to the Standard-Examiner, parts of the film were shot on the Metro Goldwyn Mayer backlot.

The San Bernardino Sun wrote that "mystery and intrigue is the formula" for this "scary tale" with a "surprise switch ending".

While one reviewer felt that "older audience members might find themselves more bored than entertained", film critic Richard Gray of Letterboxd felt the film has "ineffable charm" and is "a fun and fast period caper".

== Cast ==
The cast includes:

- Burgess Meredith as Henry Meade
- Agnes Moorehead as Mrs. Pringle
- Bill Zuckert as Sheriff Frank Wiley
- Larry D. Mann as John Halper
- Kim Richards as the girl outside Mr. Meade's house
- Erin Moran as the student on the camping trip
- Parley Baer as Mayor George Hathaway
- Skip Homeier as Harry
- Kelly Thordsen as Tiny
- Bob Hastings as Deputy Tom Martin
- Jimmy Lydon as Jim Durden
- Tol Avery as the man at the parents meeting
- Betty Bronson as the woman at the parents meeting
- Annie McEveety as Tippy Durden
- Jimmy Bracken as Scott Durden
- Patrick Creamer as Wilbur "Catfish" Merkens
- Ben Frommer as the man in Halper's Malt Shop
- Tramp the Dog
