= Tom Leetch =

American film director

Tom Leetch is an American film producer, writer and director. His career included working on films for Walt Disney Productions, under the leadership of Walt Disney's son-in-law, Ron Miller. At Disney, Leetch first began as an assistant director on films such as Mary Poppins, The Ugly Dachshund and Monkeys, Go Home. He then served in several positions as producer, associate producer, and director on films such as Snowball Express, Ride a Northbound Horse, My Dog, the Thief, Secrets of the Pirate's Inn, Menace on the Mountain, Bayou Boy, The Strange Monster of Strawberry Cove, Napoleon and Samantha, Freaky Friday, The North Avenue Irregulars, and The Watcher in the Woods, a project in which he pitched to Ron Miller stating, "This could be our Exorcist."

In addition, Leetch later served as producer and unit production manager on the TV series, Northern Exposure.
