= Vincent McEveety =

American film director, television director and producer (1929–2018)

- Born: Vincent Michael McEveety; August 10, 1929; Los Angeles, California, United States
- Died: May 19, 2018 (aged 88); Los Angeles, California, United States
- Occupations: Film director, television producer, television director
- Years active: 1957–2000
- Spouse: Mary Ann O'Dell

Vincent Michael McEveety (August 10, 1929 – May 19, 2018) was an American film and television director and producer.

== Career ==
Vince McEveety directed numerous Emmy Award-winning television series, including The Untouchables, 35 episodes of Gunsmoke, six Star Trek episodes (including "Dagger of the Mind", "Balance of Terror", "Patterns of Force" and "Spectre of the Gun"), Magnum, P.I., How the West Was Won, The Man from U.N.C.L.E., Stranger at My Door, Murder, She Wrote, and Diagnosis: Murder, starring Dick Van Dyke.

In 1991, McEveety directed the award-winning episode of the NBC television series In the Heat of the Night, titled "Sweet, Sweet Blues", guest-starring musician Bobby Short and veteran actor James Best. That year Heat won its first NAACP Image Award for Outstanding Dramatic Series and James Best won the Crystal Reel Award for Best Actor.

From 1994 through 1997, McEveety produced the television series Columbo starring Peter Falk, for which he also directed seven episodes between 1990 and 1997. Homage was paid to his contributions to the series by a humorous mention of a character having his surname in the Columbo episode "Undercover", which he directed.

McEveety directed numerous films for Walt Disney Productions, including The Million Dollar Duck, The Biscuit Eater, Menace on the Mountain, Superdad, The Ghost of Cypress Swamp, The Strongest Man in the World, The Apple Dumpling Gang Rides Again, Herbie Goes to Monte Carlo, and Herbie Goes Bananas. McEveety also directed portions of The Watcher in the Woods.

His film Firecreek (1968), starring James Stewart, Henry Fonda and Inger Stevens, touches on issues previously ignored by the genre and influenced a generation of filmmakers. McEveety returned to the Western genre with The Castaway Cowboy (1974), starring James Garner and Vera Miles.

== Selected filmography ==
Film

- Firecreek (1968)
- The Million Dollar Duck (1971)
- The Biscuit Eater (1972)
- Charley and the Angel (1973)
- Superdad (1973)
- The Castaway Cowboy (1974)
- The Strongest Man in the World (1975)
- Treasure of Matecumbe (1976)
- Gus (1976)
- Herbie Goes to Monte Carlo (1977)
- The Apple Dumpling Gang Rides Again (1979)
- Herbie Goes Bananas (1980)
- Amy (1981)

TV movies

- Menace on the Mountain (1970)
- Wonder Woman (1974)
- The Ghost of Cypress Swamp (1977)
- Ask Max (1986)
- Gunsmoke: Return to Dodge (1987)
- Stranger at My Door (1991)
- A Perry Mason Mystery: The Case of the Jealous Jokester (1995)

== Family ==
McEveety was born in Los Angeles, the son of Bernard Francis McEveety (1893–1971) and Mary Ellen McEveety (née Leahy, 1888–1971). He married Mary Ann O'Dell (1935–2023), with whom he had four children.
