= Spectre of the Gun =

- Star Trek: The Original Series episode
- Episode no.: Season 3 Episode 6
- Directed by: Vincent McEveety
- Written by: Lee Cronin; (Gene L. Coon)
- Cinematography by: Gerald Finnerman
- Production code: 056
- Original air date: October 25, 1968

Guest appearances
- Ron Soble – Wyatt Earp; Bonnie Beecher – Sylvia; Charles Maxwell – Virgil Earp; Rex Holman – Morgan Earp; Sam Gilman – Doc Holliday; Charles Seel – Ed (bartender); Bill Zuckert – Sheriff Johnny Behan; Ed McCready – Barber; Abraham Sofaer – Melkotian Voice

Episode chronology
← Previous "Is There in Truth No Beauty?"	Next → "Day of the Dove"
- Star Trek: The Original Series season 3

"Spectre of the Gun" is the sixth episode of the third season of the American science fiction television series Star Trek. Written by the series' former showrunner, Gene L. Coon (under the pseudonym of Lee Cronin), and directed by Vincent McEveety, it was first broadcast on October 25, 1968.

In the episode, having been found trespassing into Melkotian space, Captain Kirk and members of his crew are sent to die in a surreal re-enactment of the Gunfight at the O.K. Corral.

== Plot ==
The Federation starship Enterprise has been directed to make contact with a reclusive species known as the Melkotians. As they approach the Melkotians' planet, they encounter a probe carrying a warning for them to stay away. Crewmembers hear the warning in their native languages, suggesting that the Melkotians are telepaths. Despite First Officer Spock's warnings about the formidableness of telepaths, Captain Kirk orders the ship to remain on course. Once in orbit, Kirk, Spock, Chief Engineer Scott, Chief Medical Officer Dr. McCoy, and Navigator Ensign Chekov transport to the surface.

They are met by a Melkotian emissary, who declares that they have been condemned to death for trespassing. The landing party then find themselves in an abstract landscape that resembles an Old Western town, though many buildings are only simple wooden facades. Furthermore, they find their phasers have been changed into six-shooters, and they cannot contact the Enterprise.

Exploring the town, they find a newspaper dated October 26, 1881, the date of the infamous gunfight at the O.K. Corral. The townspeople believe the landing party are members of the Cowboys: Kirk as Ike Clanton, Scott as Billy Clanton, McCoy as Tom McLaury, Spock as Frank McLaury, and Chekov as Billy Claiborne. The crew soon discovers that men dressed as the Earp brothers; Virgil, Wyatt, and Morgan, as well as their deputy Doc Holliday, are preparing to fight them at the appointed time.

Knowing that in real history the gunfight was fatal to most of the Cowboys, the Enterprise crew try to change their fates by getting the sheriff and the townspeople to stop the fight and even attempt to negotiate with the Earps; despite their efforts, nothing works. However, when a barmaid, Sylvia, gets close to Chekov, a jealous Morgan Earp shoots him dead. Spock remarks that the real Billy Claiborne had survived, suggesting that the day's events could be changed in other ways. To that end, Spock creates an improvised tranquilizer gas grenade to subdue the Earps before the shootout and is surprised when the gas fails to work.

The time of the shootout draws near; a defiant Kirk and the landing party suddenly find themselves at the O.K. Corral, with the Earps approaching. Spock realizes from the failure of the gas grenade and the "death" of Chekov that the world they are in does not conform to the laws of reality and persuades the others that as long as they are convinced of that they cannot be harmed. Kirk has Spock mind-meld with the rest of the team to imbue them with absolute conviction. Thus, when the Earps and Holliday open fire, their bullets pass harmlessly through.

Kirk beats Wyatt Earp in a fistfight and disarms him, but throws his own weapon away rather than avenge Chekov's death. The crew then find themselves on the Enterprise bridge, including Chekov, who survived perhaps because his mind was only on Sylvia. The Melkotians make contact, inquire about Kirk's refusal to kill, and finally welcome the Enterprise to approach their planet.

== Production ==
In Star Trek 3, author James Blish's novelization of this episode was called "The Last Gunfight".

The show was the last episode to air on NBC at 10 p.m. on Fridays.

This was DeForest Kelley's third time playing a character in the gunfight at the O.K. Corral. Previously, he had appeared in season 4, episode 8, of You are There as Ike Clanton. Then he played Morgan Earp in the 1957 film Gunfight at the O.K. Corral.

As money was not available for a full set, director Vincent McEveety was asked to use a stylized Western street of false building fronts and no sides.

== Reception ==
Walter Koenig described this episode as his favorite, stating, "I enjoyed doing [it] the most and ... thought it was my best episode at the time."

Zack Handlen of The A.V. Club gave the episode a B+ rating, marking it down for loose writing but praising its impressive final showdown and "weird, arrhythmic vibe working for the show for once". In 2012, The A.V. Club ranked this episode as one of top ten "must see" episodes of the original series.

In 2012, Christian Science Monitor ranked this the ninth best episode of the original Star Trek.

Keith R. A. DeCandido of Tor.com initially criticizes the episode for its historical inaccuracies, but then praises it on a philosophical level, noting that Kirk and company never fight when provoked, do not kill for revenge, and ignore the initial warning in favor of carrying out their directives to seek out new life.

In 2016, The Hollywood Reporter ranked "Spectre of the Gun" as the 20th best episode of the original series.

In 2017, Den of Geek ranked this episode as the 10th "best worst" Star Trek episode of the original series.

== Home media releases ==
This episode was released on LaserDisc, paired with "Day of the Dove" in 1987 in the United States.

This episode was released on VHS in the United Kingdom, paired with "Assignment: Earth" (Season 2 Episode 26).

This episode was released in Japan on December 21, 1993 as part of the complete season 3 LaserDisc set, Star Trek: Original Series log.3. A trailer for this and the other episodes was also included; the episode also had English and Japanese audio tracks. The cover script was スター・トレック TVサードシーズン.
