= Hal Gausman =

American set decorator

- Born: Hal Gordon Gausman; November 13, 1917; Los Angeles, California
- Died: June 10, 2003 (aged 85); Oxnard, California
- Occupation: Set decorator
- Years active: 1952–1989

Hal Gordon Gausman (November 13, 1917 - June 10, 2003) was an American set decorator. He was nominated for five Academy Awards in the category Best Art Direction.

== Biography ==
Gausman was born in Los Angeles, California in 1917, as the second son to Harvey Elwood Gausman (1886–1944) and his wife, Maude F. Coffy. His older brother was Harvey Elwood Gausman, Jr. (1913–1981).

Gausman married in 1947, and moved to Oxnard, California. He was hired by Walt Disney in 1961 to be the set decorator for The Absent-Minded Professor. Having done set decorations for films since 1952, Gausman took the offer, and subsequently did set decorations for films including Mary Poppins, Bedknobs and Broomsticks, Escape to Witch Mountain, Back to the Future (in which a photo of Gausman was used as former Hill Valley mayor Red Thomas), and Jaws: The Revenge.

Gausman retired from set decorations in 1989, and died at home on June 10, 2003. He was 85 years old.

== Selected filmography ==
Gausman was nominated for five Academy Awards for Best Art Direction:

- The Absent-Minded Professor (1961)
- Mary Poppins (1964)
- Bedknobs and Broomsticks (1971)
- The Island at the Top of the World (1974)
- The Untouchables (1987)

Additional film credits include:

- Ride a Northbound Horse (1969)
- Secrets of the Pirate's Inn (1969)
- The Secret of the Pond (1975)
- Animal House (1978)
- The Blues Brothers (1980)
- Back to the Future (1985)
- Jaws: The Revenge (1987)
