= Menace on the Mountain =

1970 Disney television film

- Genre: Adventure
- Based on: Menace on the Mountain by Mary A. Hancock
- Directed by: Vincent McEveety
- Starring: Jodie Foster; Dub Taylor; Mitch Vogel
- Composer: Buddy Baker
- Country of origin: United States
- Original language: English

Production
- Producer: Ron W. Miller
- Production company: Walt Disney Productions

Original release
- Network: NBC
- Release: March 1 – March 8, 1970

Menace on the Mountain is a 1970 American television film produced by Walt Disney Productions. Directed by Vincent McEveety, it originally aired in two parts on NBC's The Wonderful World of Disney on March 1 and March 8, 1970.

The film was based on Mary A. Hancock's 1968 book Menace on the Mountain. The book concerns the Fort Hamby Gang, a group of Civil War deserters and outlaws active in northwestern North Carolina near the end of the American Civil War.

The film was produced by Ron W. Miller, co-produced by Tom Leetch, art direction by John B. Mansbridge, set decoration by Emile Kuri and Frank R. McKelvy, music by Buddy Baker, and sound by Robert O. Cook.

== Cast ==
The cast includes:

- Jodie Foster as Suellen McIver
- Dub Taylor as Cicero Everhart
- Mitch Vogel as Jamie McIver
- Charles Aidman as Jed McIver
- Pat Crowley as Leah McIver
- Eric Shea as Mark McIver
- Richard Anderson as Major Galt
- James Nusser as Ben Forrester
- Kelton Garwood as Mr. Sykes
- Albert Salmi as Poss Timmerlake
- Gregg Palmer as Posse Bushwhacker
- Dan Ferrone as Lieutenant Saunders
