= My Dog, the Thief =

1969 Disney television film

- Genre: Adventure
- Based on: Story by Gordon Buford
- Written by: Myles Wilder; William Raynor
- Directed by: Robert Stevenson
- Starring: Joe Flynn; Roger C. Carmel; Elsa Lanchester
- Composer: George Bruns
- Country of origin: United States
- Original language: English

Production
- Producer: Ron W. Miller
- Editor: Cotton Warburton
- Production company: Walt Disney Productions

Original release
- Network: NBC
- Release: September 21 – September 28, 1969

My Dog, the Thief is a 1969 American television film produced by Walt Disney Productions. Directed by Robert Stevenson, it originally aired in two parts on NBC's The Wonderful World of Disney on September 21 and September 28, 1969.

The film was based on a story by Gordon Buford, who created the story that became The Love Bug and its subsequent Herbie franchise. The screenwriters were Myles Wilder and William Raynor.

The film was produced by Ron W. Miller, co-produced by Tom Leetch, edited by Cotton Warburton, art direction by John B. Mansbridge, set decoration by Emile Kuri, special effects by Eustace Lycett, music by George Bruns, and sound by Robert O. Cook.

Noel the St. Bernard was selected for the lead role in the fall of 1968, and actor Fred Clark was originally set to appear.

Filming was supposed to take six weeks but ended up taking eight weeks when one of the actors got injured. Disney film editor Norman "Stormy" Palmer made an unusual onscreen appearance as a reporter. The opening sequence features the song "That Dog, Barabbas", written by Terry Gilkyson.

The Intelligencer called it a "hilarious comedy built around a soulful St. Bernard", while The Lima News declared it "comedy played for cuteness". Reporter Bob Thomas of the Associated Press reported that it drew a large audience.

The film was adapted for the syndicated newspaper comic strip Walt Disney's Treasury of Classic Tales. A novelization of the film was published by Pyramid Books in 1976.

At one point the film was scheduled for a theatrical release in Europe. Disney released the film on DVD on January 17, 2006. It was later made available on Disney+. In 2020, The Ringer included My Dog, the Thief in its survey of "Golden Age" dog films.

== Cast ==
- Joe Flynn as P.J. Applegate
- Roger C. Carmel as McClure
- Elsa Lanchester as Mrs. Formby
- Herb Vigran as the Helicopter Mechanic
- Charles Lane as Mr. Pfeiffer
- Burt Mustin as the Man eating a sandwich
- Dwayne Hickman as Jack Crandall
- Mary Ann Mobley as Kim Lawrence
- John Van Dreelen as George Travell
- Mickey Shaughnessy as Foley
- Ken Lynch as the Detective
- Paul Smith as the Policeman
- Vaughn Taylor as the Dog Catcher
- Paul Bryar as the Motorcycle Cop
- George Cisar as Herman
- Jonathan Hole as the Jewelry Store Clerk
- J. Edward McKinley as the Golfer
- Norman R. Palmer as the Reporter
- The Bernardiner Noel as Barabbas
- Richard Collier as Barabbas' Owner
- Jim Begg as the Baker
- James Gonzalez as the Jeweler
- Robert Hitchcock as the Milkman
- Leon Alton as the First Motorist
- Jimmy Casino as Motorist
- Michelle Breeze as Motorist
- Kenner G. Kemp as the Man in the White Suit
- Monty Margetts as Herman's Wife
- Frieda Rentie as the Woman
- Al Roberts as the Mailman
- Jason Fithian as Minor Role
