= John B. Mansbridge =

American art director

- Born: March 20, 1917; Jackson County, South Dakota, US
- Died: January 11, 2016 (aged 98); La Quinta, California, US
- Occupation: Art director
- Years active: 1941–1991

John B. Mansbridge (March 20, 1917 – January 11, 2016) was an American art director. He was nominated for two Academy Awards in the category Best Art Direction. He won the lifetime achievement award at the Art Directors Guild in 2006. He also won a Primetime Emmy Award in 1988 for Outstanding Art Direction for a Series, for the television series Beauty and the Beast.

== Selected filmography ==
Mansbridge was nominated for two Academy Awards for Best Art Direction:

- Bedknobs and Broomsticks (1971)
- The Island at the Top of the World (1974)

He won the Primetime Emmy Award for Outstanding Art Direction in a Series:

- Beauty and the Beast (1988)

He also worked on:

- Ride a Northbound Horse (1969)
- My Dog, the Thief (1969)
- Secrets of the Pirate's Inn (1969)
- Menace on the Mountain (1970)
- The Wacky Zoo of Morgan City (1970)
- Bayou Boy (1971)
- The Strange Monster of Strawberry Cove (1971)
- The Mystery in Dracula's Castle (1973)
- The Secret of the Pond (1975)
- The Million Dollar Dixie Deliverance (1978)
- Shadow of Fear (1979)
