= Bayou Boy =

1971 Disney television film

- Genre: Adventure
- Written by: Louis Pelletier
- Directed by: Gary Nelson
- Starring: Mitch Vogel; Mike Lookinland; Vito Scotti
- Composer: Buddy Baker
- Country of origin: United States
- Original language: English

Production
- Producer: James Algar
- Cinematography: William Cronjager
- Editor: Lloyd L. Richardson
- Production company: Walt Disney Productions

Original release
- Network: NBC
- Release: February 7 – February 14, 1971

Bayou Boy is a 1971 American television adventure film produced by Walt Disney Productions. Directed by Gary Nelson and written by Louis Pelletier, it originally aired in two parts on NBC's The Wonderful World of Disney on February 7 and February 14, 1971. The film was rebroadcast by NBC in 1979 under the title The Boy from Dead Man's Bayou.

== Plot ==
Jeannot Boudreau is determined to locate a sunken silver church bell that is lost in Dead Man’s Bayou in the Louisiana backwoods, after a hurricane destroyed the church it was located in. He wants to retrieve it to honor his father, who helped cast the bell. To find the bell he must contend with a giant alligator who patrols the bayou.

== Cast ==
- Mitch Vogel as Jeannot Boudreau
- Mike Lookinland as Claude
- Vito Scotti as Mr. Bob
- Paul Fix as Captain Pierre
- John McIntire as Father Boudreau
- Jeanette Nolan as Tante Louise
- Marcel Hillaire as M. Verret
- Frank Silvera as Uncle Maxim
- Percy Rodrigues as Charbot
- Michael Ontkean as Alcide
- Brad David as Phillipe

== Production ==
The film was produced by James Algar, co-produced by Tom Leetch, cinematography by William Cronjager, art direction by John B. Mansbridge and Ed Graves, film editing by Lloyd L. Richardson, set decoration by Emile Kuri, music by Buddy Baker, and sound by Robert O. Cook.

Co-stars John McIntire and Jeanette Nolan were married in real life, and often appeared in the same shows and movies.

Filming took place at Pine Island Point at Caddo Lake, on the Texas-Louisiana border near Shreveport. In one instance when a stuntman failed to show up, a local highway patrolman was asked to fall 25 feet in a lake. After filming Governor Preston Smith made the cast of the film honorary Texas citizens.

A $12,000 replica of the bayou was constructed at Disney Studio in Burbank for the alligator fight scene.

== Music ==
The musical score was composed by Buddy Baker. The opening title song, "Bayou Boy", was written by Terry Gilkyson and performed by his daughter Lisa.

== Reception ==
The Robesonian called it an "exciting two-part action adventure drama", and The Oneonta Star felt that it was "suitable family fare". The Daily Herald referred to it as a "mystery adventure", and the Albuquerque Journal wrote that "kids should eat it up."
