= Ride a Northbound Horse =

1969 Disney television film

- Genre: Western
- Based on: Ride a Northbound Horse by Richard Wormser
- Directed by: Robert Totten
- Starring: Carroll O'Connor; Jack Elam; Dub Taylor
- Composer: George Bruns
- Country of origin: United States
- Original language: English

Production
- Producer: Ron W. Miller
- Editor: Cotton Warburton
- Production company: Walt Disney Productions

Original release
- Network: NBC
- Release: March 16 – March 23, 1969

Ride a Northbound Horse is a 1969 American television film produced by Walt Disney Productions based on the 1964 book of the same name by Richard Wormser. Directed by Robert Totten, it originally aired in two parts on NBC's Walt Disney's Wonderful World of Color on March 16 and March 23, 1969.

The film was produced by Ron W. Miller, co-produced by Tom Leetch, edited by Cotton Warburton, art direction by John B. Mansbridge, set decoration by Emile Kuri and Hal Gausman, music by George Bruns, and sound by Robert O. Cook.

The Western follows orphan Cav Rand as he tries to recover his stolen horse with the help of a rancher.

== Cast ==
- Carroll O'Connor as Mr. Davis
- Jack Elam as the Sheriff
- Dub Taylor as Purse
- Mills Watson as Bridge Bandit No. 1
- Andy Devine as Jim Demmer
- Harry Carey Jr. as Yonder
- Ted Gehring as Macklin
- Michael Shea as Cav Rand
- Ben Johnson as Will Parker
- Edith Atwater as Mrs. Addy Mason
- Rex Holman as Bridge Bandit No. 2
- Steve Raines as Cowboy
- Hal Baylor as Gang Member
- Bill Coontz as Gang Member
- Arthur Tovey as Townsman at Sale
- Pepe Callahan as Mexican Gang Member
