= Lt. Robin Crusoe, U.S.N. =

1966 film by Byron Paul

- Original theatrical poster
- Directed by: Byron Paul
- Screenplay by: Don DaGradi; Bill Walsh
- Story by: Walt Disney
- Based on: Robinson Crusoe by Daniel Defoe
- Produced by: Ron W. Miller; Bill Walsh; Walt Disney (uncredited)
- Starring: Dick Van Dyke; Nancy Kwan
- Cinematography: William E. Snyder
- Edited by: Cotton Warburton
- Music by: Robert F. Brunner
- Production company: Walt Disney Productions
- Distributed by: Buena Vista Distribution
- Release dates: June 29, 1966 (Premiere); July 29, 1966 (U.S.)
- Running time: 114 minutes
- Country: United States
- Language: English
- Box office: $22,565,634

Lt. Robin Crusoe U.S.N. is a 1966 American comedy film released by Walt Disney Productions, and starring Dick Van Dyke as a U.S. Navy pilot who becomes a castaway on a tropical island. Some filming took place in San Diego, while a majority of the film was shot on Kauaʻi, Hawaii.

The story was loosely based on Daniel Defoe's classic 1719 novel Robinson Crusoe. It was Walt Disney's idea to make the adaptation, and this is the only film where he received a story credit (as "Retlaw Yensid", which is his name spelled backwards).

== Plot ==
While flying a routine mission for the U.S. Navy from his aircraft carrier, an emergency causes Lieutenant Robin "Rob" Crusoe (Van Dyke), a Naval Aviator, to eject from his F-8 Crusader into the ocean. Crusoe drifts on the ocean in an emergency life raft for several days and nights until landing on an uninhabited island. He builds a shelter for himself, fashions new clothing out of available materials, and begins to scout the island, discovering an abandoned Japanese submarine from World War II. Scouring the submarine, Crusoe also discovers a NASA chimpanzee astronaut named Floyd, played by Dinky.

Using tools and blueprints found in the submarine, Crusoe and Floyd construct a Japanese pavilion, a golf course, and a mail delivery system for sending bottles containing missives to his fiancee out to sea.

Soon after, the castaway discovers that the island is not entirely uninhabited when he encounters a beautiful island girl (Nancy Kwan), whom he names Wednesday. Wednesday recounts that due to her unwillingness to marry, her chieftain father, Tanamashuhi (Akim Tamiroff), plans to sacrifice her and her sisters to Kaboona, an immense effigy on the island with whom he pretends to communicate.

The day Tanamashu arrives on the island, Crusoe uses paraphernalia from the submarine to combat him, culminating in the destruction of the Kaboona statue.

After the battle, Crusoe and Tanamashu make peace. When Crusoe makes it known that he does not wish to marry Wednesday, he is forced to flee to avoid her wrath. Pursued by a mob of irate island women, he is spotted by a U.S. Navy helicopter and he and Floyd narrowly escape with their lives. Large crowds turn out for their arrival on an aircraft carrier deck, but Floyd steals all the limelight.

== Cast ==
- Dick Van Dyke as LT Robin Crusoe
- Nancy Kwan as Wednesday
- Akim Tamiroff as Tanamashu
- Arthur Malet as Umbrella Man
- Tyler McVey as Captain
- Peter Renaday as Pilot
- Peter Duryea as Co-Pilot
- John Dennis as Crew Chief
- Nancy Hsueh as Native Girl 1
- Victoria Young as Native Girl 2
- Yvonne Ribuca as Native Girl 3
- Bebe Louie as Native Girl 4
- Lucia Valero as Native Girl 5
- Richard Deacon as Survival Manual Narrator (voice only, uncredited)

== Production ==
Cameraman Robert King Baggot (son of King Baggott) died of injuries received during the filming.

== Release ==
Lt. Robin Crusoe, U.S.N. had its world premiere on June 25, 1966. Since the U.S. Navy cooperated by allowing the producers to film on the aircraft carrier USS Kitty Hawk, Walt Disney arranged a special world premiere aboard the ship in San Diego, simultaneously with the USS Constellation docked in the South China Sea. Disney regulars Fred MacMurray, Suzanne Pleshette and Annette Funicello were among those transported by air to San Diego for the premiere. The film began its theatrical run in Los Angeles four days later on June 29. It was paired with the live-action short Run, Appaloosa, Run!

== Home media ==
Lt. Robin Crusoe, U.S.N. was released through VHS on July 26, 1986. On April 12, 2005, it was released on DVD.

== Reviews ==
Upon its initial release, critics gave it mediocre reviews. However, likely because of Dick Van Dyke's popularity, the film proved to be a financial hit grossing over $22 million at the box office, earning $7.5 million in domestic theatrical rentals. It was re-released to theaters in 1974.

Howard Thompson of The New York Times wrote: "It's neither funny nor new and the picture is recommended, with reservations, only for the very, very young and for television fans who think Mr. Van Dyke can do no wrong." Variety called the film "one of Walt Disney's slighter entries. Intended as a wacky modern-day simulation of the Daniel Defoe classic, it might have borne up in reduced running-time but in its present far-overlength 115 minutes misses as sustained entertainment." Kevin Thomas of the Los Angeles Times wrote that "sophisticated parents might want to stay away", but Dick Van Dyke was "both ingratiating and funny" in the title role. Richard L. Coe of The Washington Post called it a "cheerfully foolish comedy" and concluded: "For sheer comic ease ... Van Dyke is without peer and if 'Robin Crusoe' is no world shaker, it still has Van Dyke."

TV Guide gave the film 1 out of 5 stars, stating that "Robinson Crusoe update is wholly contrived and not really creative." Leonard Maltin's home video guide gave it the lowest possible rating of BOMB and said it had "virtually nothing of merit to recommend".

== See also ==
- List of American films of 1966
- List of Walt Disney Pictures films
