= Robert O. Cook =

American sound engineer

- Born: Robert Oscar Cook; September 27, 1903; Manitowoc, Wisconsin, United States
- Died: November 9, 1995 (aged 92); Pasadena, California, United States
- Occupation: Sound engineer
- Years active: 1946-1977

Robert O. Cook (September 27, 1903 – November 9, 1995) was an American sound engineer. He was nominated for three Academy Awards in the category Sound Recording. He worked on nearly 100 films between 1946 and 1977.

== Selected filmography ==
- The Parent Trap (1961)
- Bon Voyage! (1962)
- Mary Poppins (1964)
- One Day on Beetle Rock (1967)
- Ride a Northbound Horse (1969)
- My Dog, the Thief (1969)
- Secrets of the Pirate's Inn (1969)
- Menace on the Mountain (1970)
- The Wacky Zoo of Morgan City (1970)
- Bayou Boy (1971)
- The Strange Monster of Strawberry Cove (1971)
