= Frank R. McKelvy =

American set decorator

- Born: January 24, 1914; Pennsylvania
- Died: February 18, 1980 (aged 66); Los Angeles, California
- Occupation: Set decorator
- Years active: 1947-1979

Frank R. McKelvy (January 24, 1914 – February 18, 1980) was an American set decorator. He was nominated for seven Academy Awards in the category Best Art Direction. He worked on nearly 70 different films and TV shows from 1947 to 1979.

== Selected filmography ==
McKelvy was nominated for seven Academy Awards for Best Art Direction:

- The Hindenburg (1975)
- Earthquake (1974)
- They Shoot Horses, Don't They? (1969)
- The Pigeon That Took Rome (1962)
- North by Northwest (1959)
- Vertigo (1958)
- The Proud and Profane (1956)

He also worked on:

- Menace on the Mountain (1970)
- The Strange Monster of Strawberry Cove (1971)
