= Bill Zuckert =

American actor (1915–1997)

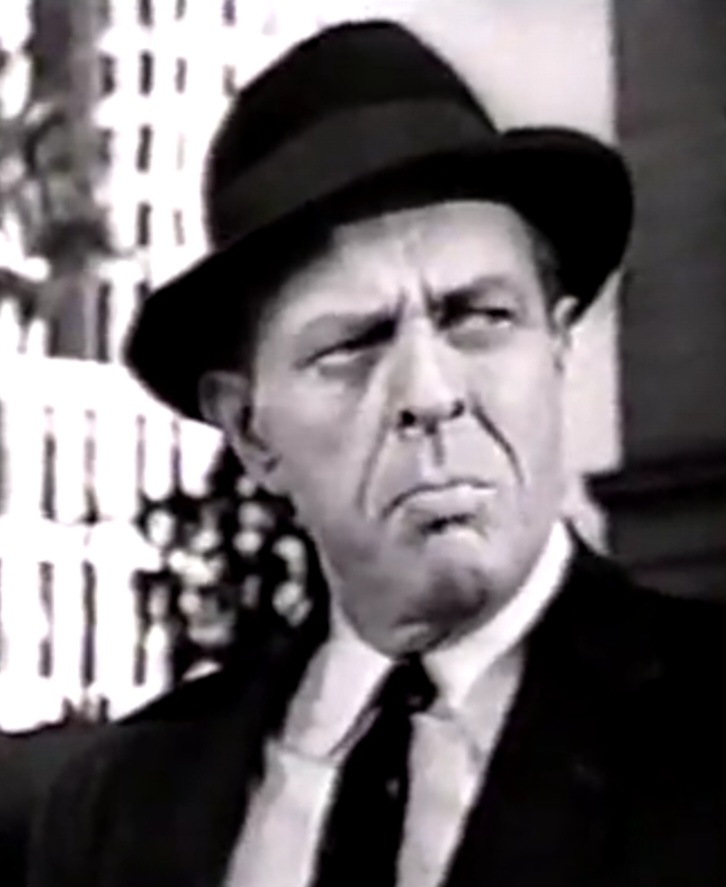
- Zuckert in an episode of Lock-Up, 1961
- Born: William Zuckert; December 18, 1915; The Bronx, New York, U.S.
- Died: January 23, 1997 (aged 81); Woodland Hills, California, U.S.
- Occupation: Actor
- Years active: 1941–1994
- Spouse: Gladys Holland
- Children: 3

William Zuckert (December 18, 1915 – January 23, 1997) was an American actor.

== Early years ==
Born and raised in The Bronx, New York, Zuckert worked in the Office of Indian Affairs in Washington, D. C. for six years. During that time he became involved with some little theater groups in Washington and adjacent areas of Maryland and Virginia. He also began performing without pay on radio programs for the March of Dimes, Red Cross, and U. S. Navy, among other organizations.

== Career ==
Zuckert began his career in 1941 in radio and lent his voice to hundreds of dramas over the next two decades. He served in New Guinea during World War II as a member of the naval construction force known as the Seabees.

On old-time radio, Zuckert portrayed Lieutenant Louis Parker in the NBC crime drama Crime and Peter Chambers. He went on to star in television, having many guest and character roles over the next half century, such as playing the sheriff in the Star Trek episode, "Spectre of the Gun". In 1962, he appeared on Gunsmoke as Mr. Asper (Quint Asper's father) in the episode "Quint Asper Comes Home" (S8E3), then he was back in 1963 as "Enoch" in the episode "I Call Him Wonder" (S8E28), then again in 1965 as "Mr. Jacobson" in the episode "Deputy Festus" (S10E17). In 1968, he guest-starred on Star Trek as Sheriff Johnny Behan on the episode "Spectre of the Gun" (S3E6).

Zuckert's Broadway credits include The Gang's All Here (1959) and Sixth Finger in a Five Finger Glove (1956).

Zuckert served on the boards of directors of two professional organizations: the Screen Actors Guild and the American Federation of Television and Radio Artists.

== Personal life ==
For 30 years Zuckert was married to actress Gladys Holland, who survived him. They had a daughter, and he had two children from a previous marriage.

== Death ==
On January 23, 1997, aged 81, Zuckert died of "pneumonia, a complication of cancer" at the Motion Picture & Television Country House and Hospital in Woodland Hills, California.

== Selected filmography ==
- Ada (1961) – Harry Davers
- The Rifleman (1961) – Debo
- Shock Corridor (1963) – 'Swaneee' Swanson
- The Alfred Hitchcock Hour (1963) (Season 2 Episode 7: "Starring the Defense") – Lieutenant Raphael (uncredited)
- The Invaders (1967) – Sergeant
- Hang 'em High (1968) – Sheriff
- The Trouble with Girls (1969) – Mayor Gilchrist
- The Great Bank Robbery (1969) – Ranger Commander
- Secrets of the Pirate's Inn (1969) – Sheriff Frank Wiley
- The Wacky Zoo of Morgan City (1970) – the Policeman
- The Strange Monster of Strawberry Cove (1971) – Sheriff Frank Wiley
- How to Frame a Figg (1971) – Commissioner Henders
- Scandalous John (1971) – Abernathy
- Family Flight (1972, TV Movie) – Frank Gross
- The Girl Most Likely to... (1973) – Priest in funeral
- The Sky's the Limit (1975) – Police Chief
- The Strongest Man in the World (1975) – Policeman
- Lipstick (1976) – Apartment Manager
- F.I.S.T. (1978) – Delegate Bob
- Loose Shoes (1978) – Hotel Detective
- Born Again (1978) – E. Howard Hunt
- Hangar 18 (1980) – Ace Landon
- Seems Like Old Times (1980) – Gas Station Attendant
- Snowballing (1984) – Sheriff Gilliam
- Little Treasure (1985) – Charlie Parker
- Under the Gun (1988) – Guard
- Critters 3 (1991) – Mr. Menges
- Bank Robber (1993) – Old Man
- Ace Ventura: Pet Detective (1994) – Mr. Finkle
- Naked Gun 33 1/3: The Final Insult (1994) – Old Man
