= Gerry Day =

American screenwriter (1922–2013)

- Born: Gerald Lallande Day; January 27, 1922; Los Angeles, California, U.S.
- Died: February 13, 2013 (aged 91); Los Angeles, California, U.S.
- Resting place: San Fernando Mission Cemetery
- Occupation: Screenwriter
- Years active: 1954–1994
- Awards: Writers Guild of America Award 1967 Writers Guild of America Award for Television: Episodic Drama – Court Martial episode "Judge Them Gently"; Nomination for Saturn Award 1980 Best Writing – The Black Hole; Nomination for Hugo Award 1980 Best Dramatic Presentation – The Black Hole

Gerry Day (January 27, 1922 – February 13, 2013) was an American screenwriter. She was also a newspaper reporter for the Hollywood Citizen News in the mid-1940s.

== Early life ==
Gerald Lallande Day was born in Los Angeles, California, the daughter of Ruthy and Lenox Day. She was given her name not because her parents had wanted a boy but due to their Southern family name traditions.

Her father was the organist for the Grauman's Egyptian Theatre on Hollywood Boulevard. She watched Howard Hughes film the miniature dogfights for the 1930 film Hell's Angels in a lot behind her childhood home. Lana Turner was her escort and gave her a campus tour when Day first enrolled at Hollywood High School. Orson Welles once hypnotized her in his magic act at the Hollywood Canteen.

== Career ==
Day later attended and graduated from UCLA in 1944. She became a newspaper reporter for the Hollywood Citizen News, filing obituaries and writing reviews of plays. She took a radio drama-writing class, which led to her writing spec scripts for some local television programs at the time. Producer Frank Wisbar would later teach her how to write teleplays for his Fireside Theater, and she would later work for Screen Gems producer Irving Starr and Ford Theatre.

In the 1950s, Day would take a break and tour around Europe, while her mother at home would write her saying that she would love watching the new television shows featuring horses — Rawhide, Have Gun Will Travel and Wagon Train. In 1959, Day, who loved horses, met with Wagon Train producer Howard Christie, who let her write her own scripts, as well as doctor others, for the series. Day would also be an unofficial bookie for the series' crew, betting on horse races for them, and eventually becoming part owner of a racehorse.

She would become well-versed in the Western genre, writing for such series as Here Come the Brides, The High Chaparral, Tate, Temple Houston, The Virginian, The Big Valley, The Outcasts, The New Land, and Little House on the Prairie. She also wrote for such other series as Medical Center; My Friend Tony; Judd, for the Defense; Peyton Place; Marcus Welby, M.D.; Dr. Kildare; Court Martial; Hawaii Five-O and Dennis the Menace. She wrote the teleplay for Shadow of Fear. She sometimes used the pseudonym Jon Gerald.

Day co-wrote scripts with Bethel Leslie, an actress and head writer for the long-running soap opera The Secret Storm. They would write scripts for series such as Bracken's World, Matt Helm, The New Adventures of Perry Mason, Electra Woman and Dyna Girl and Barnaby Jones.

== Awards and honors ==
In 1967, Day was nominated for a Writers Guild of America Award for the Court Martial episode "Judge Them Gently". In 1980, Day was co-nominated for both a Saturn Award and a Hugo Award for the screenplay of the film The Black Hole.

== Personal life and death ==
A devout Catholic, Day became a Eucharist minister in her church. She also raised foster children and supported equestrian causes. She died on February 13, 2013, after a long battle with cancer.

She was interred on February 19 at the San Fernando Mission Cemetery in Los Angeles.
