= Mitch Vogel =

American actor (born 1956)

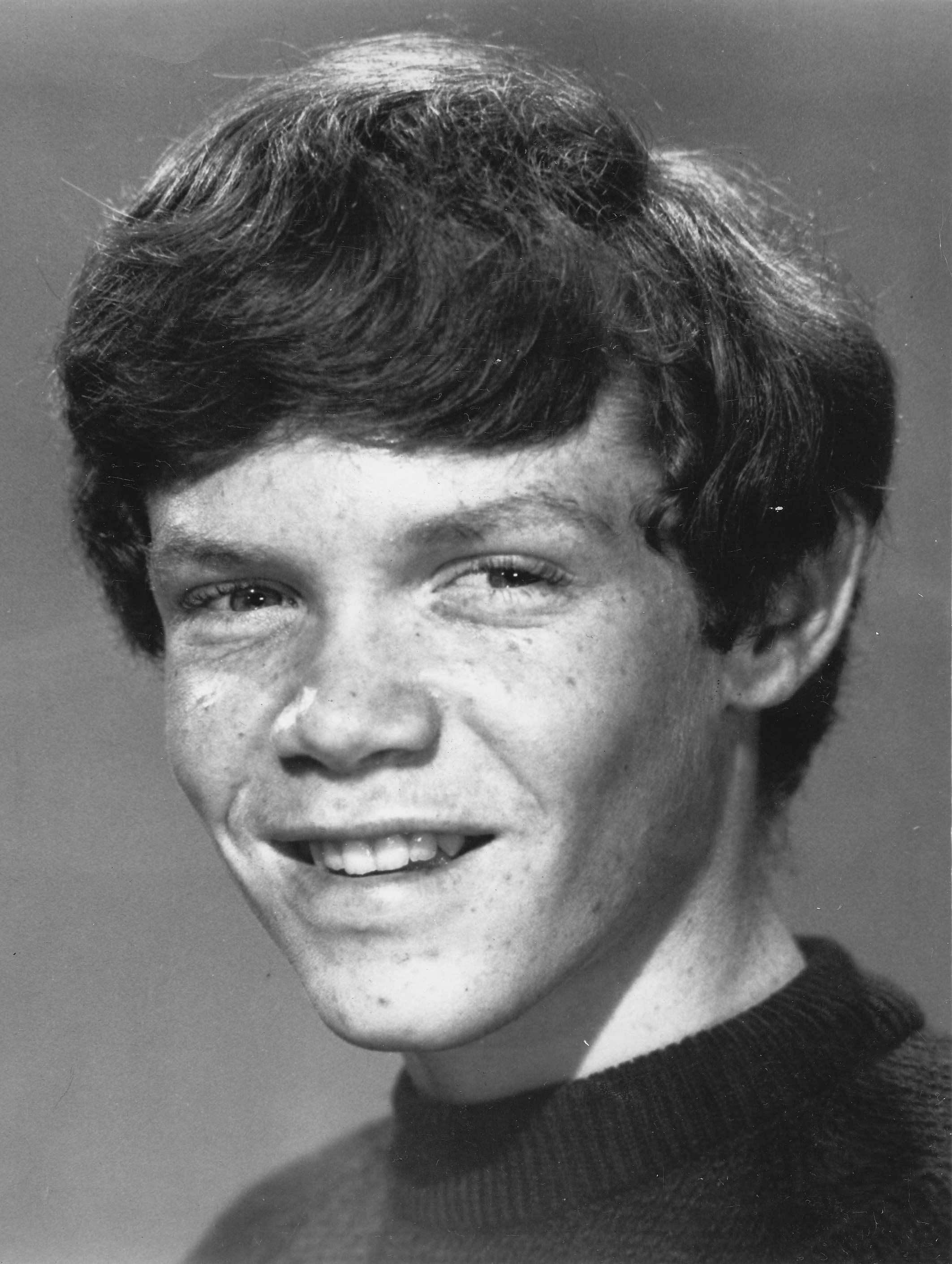
- Vogel, circa 1970
- Born: Mitchel L. Vogel; January 17, 1956 (age 70); Alhambra, California, U.S.
- Occupations: Actor; musician; director
- Years active: 1967–1978
- Spouse: Christine Gilles (m. 1985)
- Children: 2

Mitchel L. "Mitch" Vogel (born January 17, 1956) is an American former child actor, musician and director. As of 2023, he is one of two surviving main cast members from Bonanza, next to Tim Matheson.

Having begun his professional acting career at age 10, Vogel is widely known for his role as the red-headed orphan, Jamie Hunter-Cartwright on the NBC western series Bonanza, as well as for his feature film roles: as Tommy North in Yours, Mine and Ours and as Lucius McCaslin in The Reivers.

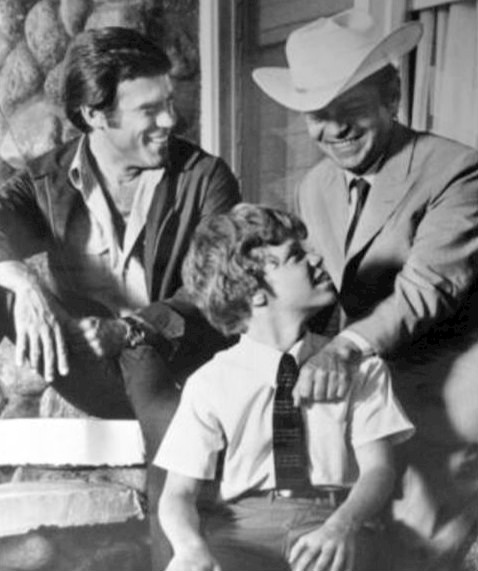
Clockwise from top left: Christopher George, Ross Martin, and Mitch Vogel on TV's The Immortal

== Biography ==
=== Early life and career ===
Born in Alhambra, California, Vogel began acting at ten, appearing in stage productions of Tom Sawyer, Heidi, Peter Pan and The Wizard of Oz. As his acting career progressed, he attended Heinz Kaiser Junior High School in Costa Mesa, California, from 1969 to 1970 and later attended Jordan Junior High School in Burbank, California.

=== Acting career ===
Vogel made his feature film debut at the age of 12, appearing in the 1968 comedy Yours, Mine and Ours, as one of Lucille Ball and Henry Fonda's brood. He obtained the role because his red hair and freckles made him look like Ball's son. He rose to prominence the following year as Lucius McCaslin in the feature film The Reivers, which earned him a Golden Globe nomination as the Best Supporting Actor of 1969.

Having established himself in feature films, Vogel briefly appeared on an episode of Bonanza broadcast on October 6, 1968, entitled "The Real People of Muddy Creek". Two years later he joined the Bonanza cast, co-starring as Jamie Hunter, an adolescent orphan taken in and eventually adopted by the Cartwrights during the last three seasons of the series.

In addition to his role on Bonanza, Vogel also guest-starred on several other western television series of the time, including The Virginian, Here Come the Brides, Adam-12, and Dundee and the Culhane. In a 1973 episode of Gunsmoke entitled "Lynch Town" Vogel played Rob Fielder, the son of a man accused of killing a woman. He had a recurring role as "Johnny Johnson" on the western frontier series Little House on the Prairie from 1974 to 1975, after which he had a starring role in the 10th episode of the Saturday morning live-action show, The Secrets of Isis and guest starred on Wonder Woman in 1978.

In addition to his guest-starring roles on episodic television series, Vogel also appeared in lead roles in the Walt Disney's Wonderful World of Color films, Menace on the Mountain in 1970 and Bayou Boy in 1971, as well as co-starring in the made-for-television films Born Innocent in 1974 and State Fair in 1976.

In 1975 he played the character “Dink” on the TV Western Gunsmoke in the episode “The Hiders” (S20E15).

=== After acting ===
In 1978, Vogel left his acting career, forming a rock band and moving to Pittsburgh. He married Christine Gilles in 1985; they have two daughters. Vogel lives in Southern California and has spent time directing and appearing in church plays, as well as singing in a band.

In 2002, Vogel returned to Bonanza's locations for the Travel Channel's TV Road Trip, in which he narrated an account of his visit to the Ponderosa Ranch in Incline Village near Lake Tahoe, Nevada. In 2004, he was featured in an interview in Bonanza Gold magazine. He participated in both the 2005 Bonanza Convention and the 2010 Bonanza Weekend in Liverpool, England. Vogel was featured in an interview published online on January 19, 2017, in which he described how he had been cast for his part on Bonanza.

== Bibliography ==
- Holmstrom, John (1996). The Moving Picture Boy: An International Encyclopaedia from 1895 to 1995. Michael Russell. p. 313. ISBN 978-0-8595-5178-6..
