= Snowball Express =

1972 film by Norman Tokar

- Theatrical poster
- Directed by: Norman Tokar
- Written by: Frankie O'Rear (book "Chateau Bon Vivant"); John O'Rear (book "Chateau Bon Vivant"); Don Tait; Jim Parker; Arnold Margolin
- Produced by: Ron Miller; Tom Leetch
- Starring: Dean Jones; Nancy Olson; Harry Morgan; Keenan Wynn; Johnny Whitaker; Michael McGreevey; George Lindsey; Kathleen Cody; Mary Wickes
- Cinematography: Frank V. Phillips
- Edited by: Robert Stafford
- Music by: Robert F. Brunner; Evelyn Kennedy; Franklyn Marks
- Production company: Walt Disney Productions
- Distributed by: Buena Vista Distribution
- Release date: December 22, 1972
- Running time: 93 minutes
- Country: United States
- Language: English
- Box office: $6,100,000 (US/ Canada rentals)

Snowball Express is a 1972 American screwball comedy film produced by Ron Miller and Tom Leetch and directed by Norman Tokar. The film is about a man who leaves his middle class job to run a hotel left to him by his great-uncle.

== Plot ==
Johnny Baxter is at his corporate job when a probate attorney tells him that his recently deceased uncle, Jacob Barnesworth, has left him sole ownership of the lucrative Grand Imperial Hotel in the fictional town of Silver Hill, Colorado. Barnesworth claimed that the hotel brings in more than $14,000 per month. Baxter views this as a golden opportunity and quits his job. He moves his family to Colorado to take proprietorship of the hotel. It is an immense but ramshackle building with no heat and a colorful old codger, Jesse McCord, living in the shed. McCord offers his services as a bartender, but Baxter assigns him the job of bellhop. Local grease monkey Wally Perkins explains that the Grand Imperial sits on a huge amount of property. Baxter realizes that they can turn the hotel into a ski resort.

Baxter attempts to secure funding for his plans. Local banker Martin Ridgeway expresses great interest in Baxter's idea, but also offers to buy the lodge, supposedly in order to convert it into a boys' school. Baxter declines, so Ridgeway declines to give Baxter a loan, citing him as a bad collateral risk and specifically pointing out that Baxter has no experience in hotel or restaurant management. Baxter meets with a friendly banker, Mr. Wainwright, at a ski lodge. Baxter claims to be an avid skier and Wainwright takes him to a black diamond run called "Nightmare Alley." Baxter ends up crashing into a tree.

While Baxter is recovering, Ridgeway gives him a check for $3,000. Baxter starts making a list of repairs for the lodge. Meanwhile, Wally works with McCord to repair the hot water heater. The water heater explodes, tearing a hole in the kitchen wall. Ridgeway's check covers the repair, but leaves nothing for the ski lift Baxter had in mind. McCord pulls an old donkey engine out of mothballs, tying a rope around it, and offers it as a makeshift ski lift. When Wally dynamites a tree stump from the ground, the explosion sets off an avalanche, blocking a passing train carrying several hundred skiers. The Baxters quickly shuttle the skiers to their resort.

All goes well until Wally loses his balance and skis down a steep mountain, dangling over a ledge. Using the donkey engine and a rope to lower Baxter down the mountain to rescue Wally, McCord accidentally cause the donkey engine to slide down the mountain and plow through the hotel. All of the guests check out, leaving the Baxters out of money once again.

Baxter goes back to Ridgeway, asking for an extension on his loan, which Ridgeway refuses. Baxter notices a sign for the Silver Hills Snowmobile Race, with a $2,500 top prize. Baxter decides to drive in the race, with McCord as his partner. Baxter's wife threatens to leave him over his carelessness and obsession. Though they come close, Baxter and McCord narrowly lose the race.

Ridgeway brings the deed transfer papers to the lodge for Baxter to sign. After threatening to begin the foreclosure process, he offers to buy the resort from Baxter. Ridgeway's secretary, Miss Wigginton, tells everyone the truth: the property includes several hundred acres of timberland originally donated to the local Indian tribes by Barnesworth for as long as the tribe inhabited the land. As the tribe has moved away or died out, the land reverts to the estate. Ridgeway wants to buy the resort in order to log the timber. McCord adds that the land the town was built on was granted by Barnesworth on the condition that several buildings be erected, including a library. Baxter's son notes that he has not seen a library, and asks why the land has not reverted to Baxter. Silver Hill is in violation of the grant, meaning that the entire town is built on land now owned by Baxter. Ridgeway agrees to loan Baxter the money necessary to repair and expand the resort.

== Cast ==
=== Main ===
- Dean Jones as Johnny Baxter
- Nancy Olson as Sue Baxter
- Harry Morgan as Jesse McCord
- Keenan Wynn as Martin Ridgeway
- Johnny Whitaker as Richard Baxter
- Michael McGreevey as Wally Perkins
- George Lindsey as Double L. Dingman
- Kathleen Cody as Chris Baxter
- Mary Wickes as Miss Wigginton

=== Supporting ===
- David White as Mr. Fowler
- Dick Van Patten as Mr. Carruthers
- Alice Backes as Miss Ogelvie
- Joanna Phillips as Naomi Voight
- John Myhers as Mr. Manescue

== Reception ==
Howard Thompson of The New York Times wrote, "What it lacks in wit it has in wholesome, hearty chuckles. Add to this some nice, snowy backgrounds and slope activity in the Colorado ski country." Variety reported: "Bearing all the elements audiences have come to expect in Disney product, film concentrates on fast action and visual comedic situations which should be well received in its intended market." Gene Siskel gave the film two-and-a-half stars out of four and noted, "Youngsters probably will be bored with a plot that ultimately hinges on a legal technicality involving the probate of a will, but they should enjoy the slapstick, the trick skiing sequences, and the family St. Bernard that detests cold weather." Fredric Milsten of the Los Angeles Times wrote, "Ironically titled, 'Snowball' is a rather slow-paced farce, which begins promisingly and then diminishes in size and effect. Its segments are rather jerkily and sloppily tacked together, and its improbabilities and illogic soon overshadow its wit." Margaret Ford of The Monthly Film Bulletin wrote that "Dean Jones and a strong supporting cast do their best with the rather flat characters, and the total result is that old American favourite, the peanut butter and jelly sandwich."
