= The Wacky Zoo of Morgan City =

1970 Disney television film

- Genre: Comedy
- Based on: I'll Trade You an Elk by Charles A. Goodrum
- Directed by: Marvin J. Chomsky
- Starring: Hal Holbrook; Joe Flynn; Penny Marshall
- Composer: George Bruns
- Country of origin: United States
- Original language: English

Production
- Producer: Bill Anderson
- Cinematography: John F. Warren
- Production company: Walt Disney Productions

Original release
- Network: NBC
- Release: October 18 – October 25, 1970

The Wacky Zoo of Morgan City is a 1970 American television film produced by Walt Disney Productions. Directed by Marvin J. Chomsky, it originally aired in two parts on NBC's The Wonderful World of Disney on October 18 and October 25, 1970.

The film was produced by Bill Anderson, cinematography by John F. Warren, art direction by John B. Mansbridge, set decoration by Emile Kuri, music by George Bruns, and sound by Robert O. Cook.

The film was based on Charles A. Goodrum's 1967 book I'll Trade You an Elk, a memoir about his father, Bernie Goodrum, and his experiences running the Wichita Municipal Zoo.

The production was filmed at the site of the former Los Angeles Zoo, after its animals had been transferred to the newer zoo in Griffith Park.

== Cast ==
- Hal Holbrook as Mitch Collins
- Joe Flynn as Mayor Philbrick
- Penny Marshall as the mayor's secretary
- Danny Bonaduce as the boy feeding the lion cub
- Wally Cox as Becker
- Michael McGreevey as Ralph
- Cecil Kellaway as Old Al Casey
- Mary LaRoche as Nancy Collins
- Anne Seymour as Maggie Hargrove
- George N. Neise as Councilman Thompson
- Ian Wolfe as Rev. Hodgins
- Harriet MacGibbon as Mrs. Westerfield
- Bill Zuckert as the policeman
- J. Edward McKinley as Councilman Parsons
- Judson Pratt as Scott Shellog
- William Benedict as Sergeant at Arms
- Jonathan Hole as the official
- Vince Howard as Officer Dan
- George Cisar as party guest
- George DeNormand as party guest
- Cosmo Sardo as party guest
- Michael-James Wixted as Noah Collins
- Christina Anderson as Jen Collins
- Annie McEveety as Rosemary
- Peter Eastman as citizen
- Daniel Elam as man on dais
- Sig Frohlich as hearing spectator
- John Pedrini as councilman
- Tony Regan as councilman
- Margaret Bacon as party guest
- Jack Clinton as party guest
- Charles Fogel as party guest
- Kenner G. Kemp as party guest
- Hans Moebus as party guest
- Chalky Williams as party guest
