= Ted Gehring =

American film and television actor (1929–2000)

- Gehring in Get Smart, 1966
- Born: Theodore Edwin Gehring Jr. April 6, 1929; Bisbee, Arizona, U.S.
- Died: September 28, 2000 (aged 71); Steelville, Missouri, U.S.
- Occupation: Actor
- Years active: 1965–1989

Theodore Edwin Gehring Jr. (April 6, 1929 – September 28, 2000) was an American film and television actor. He was best known for playing the recurring role of Charlie in the American sitcom television series Alice.

== Life and career ==
Gehring was born in Bisbee, Arizona. He began his screen career in 1965, where he first appeared in The Big Valley, playing Larsh. He continued his career, mainly appearing in film and television, often cast as a policeman, bad guy or anonymous roles, over the years.

Later in his career, Gehring guest-starred in numerous television programs including Gunsmoke, Battlestar Galactica (and its spin-off Galactica 1980), M*A*S*H, The Dukes of Hazzard, Star Trek: The Original Series, Get Smart, Bonanza, Columbo, The Rockford Files, The Waltons, Three's Company, Emergency!, Little House on the Prairie, The Strange and Deadly Occurrence, Quincy, M.E., Daniel Boone, Death Valley Days, Adam-12 and Mission: Impossible. He also appeared in films such as The Best Little Whorehouse in Texas, Nickelodeon, Bound for Glory, The Apple Dumpling Gang Rides Again, When Time Ran Out..., The Legend of the Lone Ranger, The Domino Principle and Rafferty and the Gold Dust Twins. He played Sydney Forbes in the soap opera television series Days of Our Lives in 1980.

Between 1969 and 1979, he appeared in eight films produced by Disney. The Barefoot Executive and The Apple Dumpling Gang Rides Again were released theatrically, while Ride a Northbound Horse, The Whiz Kid and the Mystery at Riverton, Hog Wild, Return of the Big Cat, and The Whiz Kid and the Carnival Caper aired as installments of The Wonderful World of Disney, and The Mystery of Rustler's Cave was shown on The New Mickey Mouse Club. From 1975 to 1976, he had a recurring role as banker Ebenezer Sprague in five episodes of Little House on the Prairie.

Gehring also starred and co-starred in other films and television programs, as it includes, The Family Holvak, playing Chester Purdle, The Police Connection, playing the role of "Police Chief Marc C. Forester" and On the Air Live with Captain Midnight, playing Father. His last film appearance, was from the television film Leave Her to Heaven, in 1988. In 1989, Gehring retired his career in film and television, last appearing in the television series 1st & Ten, where he played the recurring role as "Ned Lassiter".

== Death ==
Gehring died on September 28, 2000 in Steelville, Missouri, at the age of 71.
