= Wylly Folk St. John =

American writer (1908–1985)

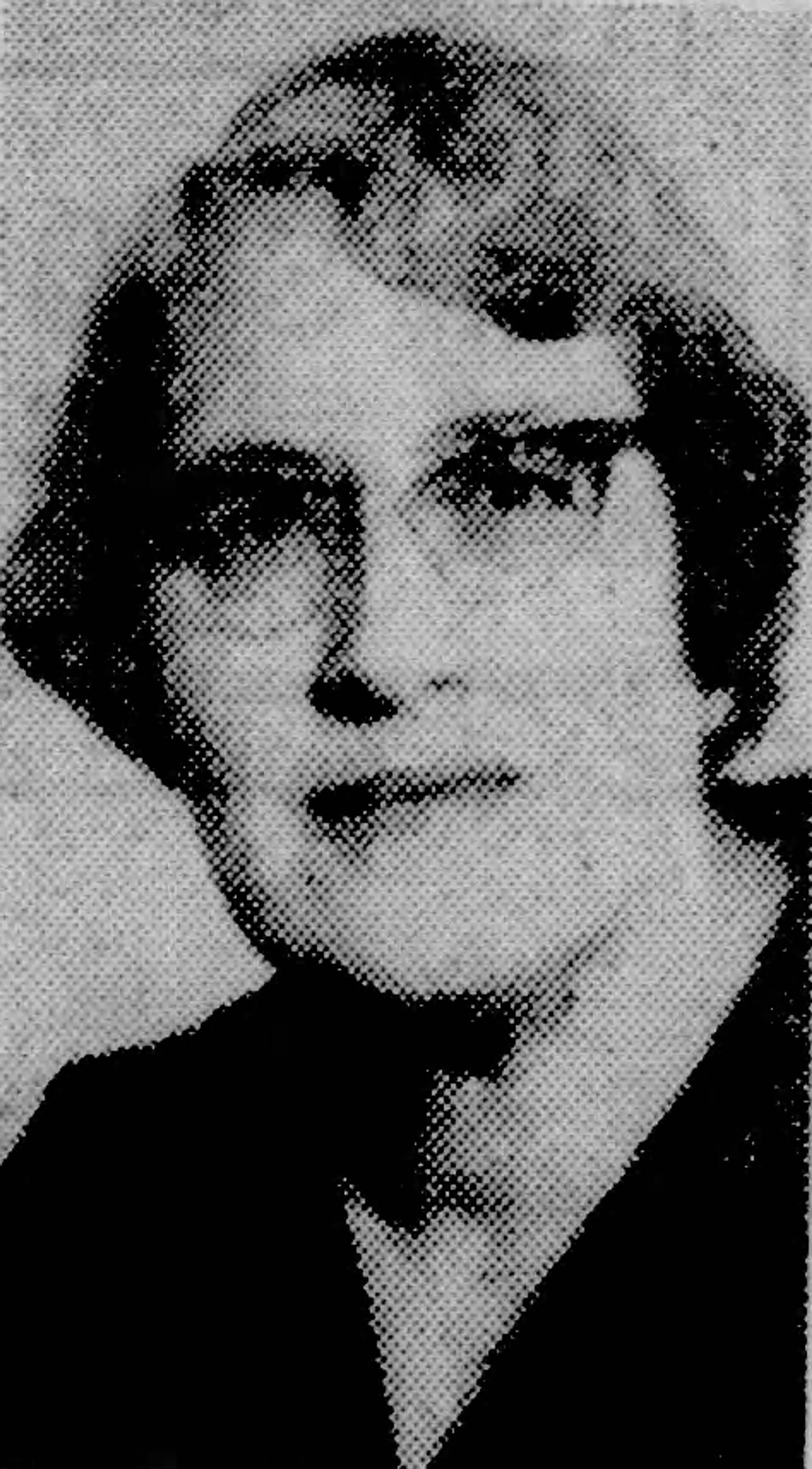
- St. John c. 1969
- Born: October 20, 1908; Bamberg County, South Carolina, US
- Died: August 16, 1985 (aged 76); Social Circle, Georgia, US
- Education: University of Georgia
- Occupations: journalist, novelist
- Spouse: Thomas Franklin St. John (1930–1983)

Wylly Folk St. John (October 20, 1908 – August 16, 1985) was an American journalist and novelist. She is best known for her children's mystery books.

== Early life and education ==
St. John was born in Bamberg County, South Carolina, but grew up in Savannah, Georgia, where she graduated from Savannah High School. She married Thomas Franklin St. John in 1930 and got her A.B. in journalism from the University of Georgia that same year. She was the president of the Women's Student Government Association and a member of Phi Beta Kappa.

== Career ==
St. John's first experience working in journalism was during college. She wrote for the humorous magazine The Georgia Cracker, a University of Georgia publication. She was the Cracker's editor during her senior year.

St. John was hired as a staff writer for the Atlanta Journal and Constitution Magazine in 1941. She worked there until 1954, when her husband, an army officer, was stationed in Germany. The couple returned to Georgia and moved to the town of Social Circle in 1966.

After returning to Georgia, St. John resumed her position at the Atlanta Journal and began writing novels. She published a total of ten novels for children and young adults, all set in the American South. Many of the characters were based on her grandchildren, great-nieces, and great-nephews. St. John published an additional five novels for adults.

St. John received numerous awards, including Georgia Author of the Year, Georgia Author of the Year for Fiction, and Theta Sigma Phi's Outstanding Contributions to Journalism Award.

Her novel The Secrets of the Pirate Inn was adapted into a Disney television movie in 1969. It was renamed “Secrets of the Pirate's Inn”, aired as part of The Wonderful World of Disney, and starred Ed Begley.

== Later life and death ==
St. John spent the last years of her life in Social Circle, Georgia. She died of cancer on August 21, 1985, at the age of 76.

== Publications ==
- The Secrets of Hidden Creek (1966)
- The Secrets of the Pirate Inn (1968)
- The Christmas Tree Mystery (1969)
- The Mystery of the Gingerbread House (1969)
- The Mystery of the Other Girl (1971)
- Mystery of the Otter (1971)
- The Ghost Next Door (1971)
- Uncle Robert's Secret (1972)
- The Secret of the Seven Crows (1973)
- The Mystery Book Mystery (1976)
