= Cotton Warburton =

American football player and film and TV editor (1911-1982)

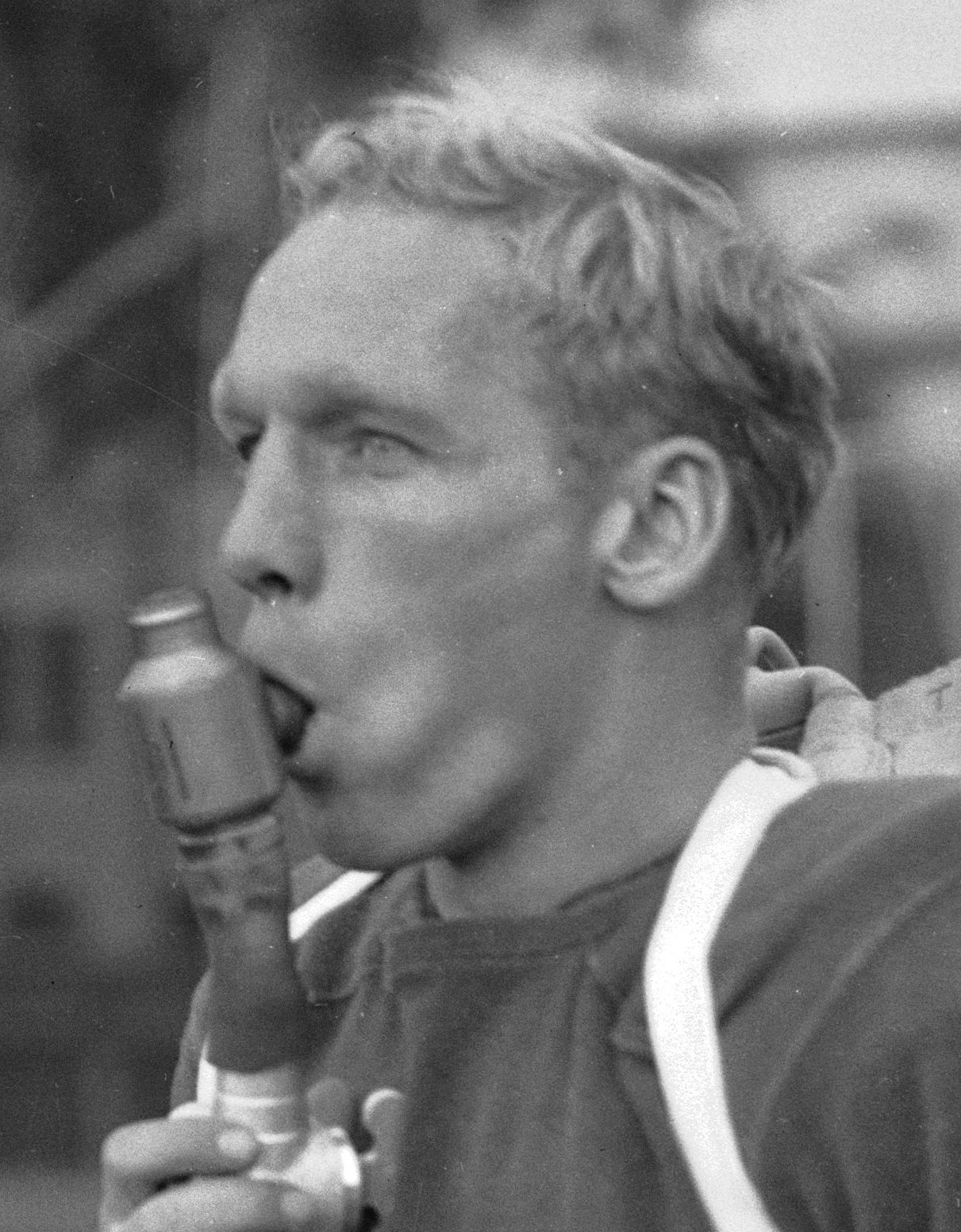
- Warburton participating in an experiment, 1933
- Born: Irvine Eugene Warburton; October 8, 1911; San Diego, California, U.S.
- Died: June 21, 1982 (aged 70); Culver City, California, U.S.
- Occupations: Film editor Football career

No. 13 – USC Trojans
- Position: Quarterback

Career information
- High school: San Diego High School
- College: USC (1932–1934)

Awards and highlights
- National champion (1932); Unanimous All-American (1933); First-team All-PCC (1933)
- College Football Hall of Fame (Class of 1975)

Irvine "Cotton" Eugene Warburton (October 8, 1911 – June 21, 1982) was an American college football quarterback (1933) who became a film and television editor with sixty feature film credits. He worked for the Metro-Goldwyn-Mayer Studios and for the Walt Disney Studios, and is probably best known for his Academy Award-winning editing of Mary Poppins (1964).

== Biography ==
Warburton was born in 1911, in San Diego, California, to Margaret Warburton. His siblings were Leland S., Los Angeles City Council member in 1945–53; Milton, Lawrence and David.

== Career in sports ==
Warburton attended San Diego High School, and won the California high school 440-yard dash in 1930. He brought his speed to the USC Trojans football team, and was chosen as an All-American quarterback in 1933. Warburton was the quarterback during a winning streak that lasted for 27 games, which remained unsurpassed at USC until 1980. Cotton was elected to the College Football Hall of Fame in 1975. Warburton's teammate Aaron Rosenberg was also elected to the Hall of Fame, and also had a successful career in the film industry as a director and producer.

== Hollywood career ==
Dance among the chimney pots from Mary Poppins (1964).

Following his graduation from the University of Southern California in 1934, Warburton declined an offer to become a professional football player with the Chicago Bears. He became an assistant film editor at Metro-Goldwyn Mayer Studios, where he remained for 19 years. As was common in the studio era, his first editing credit came after about eight years with the studio, and was for the Laurel and Hardy film Air Raid Wardens (1943). He was nominated for the Academy Award for Best Film Editing for Crazylegs (1953), a film about Elroy Hirsch's football career; Robert Niemi has suggested that the nomination acknowledged Warburton's success in "weaving documentary footage of Hirsch on the playing field into the film proper." Shortly after this film, Warburton left MGM.

By 1956 Warburton was an editor for the Walt Disney Studios, where he remained for the rest of his career. His first Disney film credit was Westward Ho, the Wagons! (1956). About 1960, he began a fruitful collaboration on feature films with Disney director Robert Stevenson. Their first film was The Absent-Minded Professor (1961). At the 37th Academy Awards, he won for best film editing for the "spectacularly successful" Mary Poppins (1964), which also earned Stevenson an Oscar nomination as best director. He also won for best film editor at the 15th American Cinema Editors Awards. Critic Drew Casper particularly notes Warburton's editing of the film's "chimney pot" musical sequence (see clip to the right). In total, Stevenson and Warburton collaborated on nine films in the 1960s and 1970s; their last film together was Herbie Rides Again (1974). He also worked on Ride a Northbound Horse, My Dog, the Thief, and Secrets of the Pirate's Inn. Warburton retired from editing after The Cat from Outer Space (1978), a Disney film directed by Norman Tokar.

Warburton was a member of the American Cinema Editors.

== See also ==
- List of film director and editor collaborations
