= Ron W. Miller =

American football player and businessman (1933–2019)

- Born: Ronald William Miller; April 17, 1933; Los Angeles, California, U.S.
- Died: February 9, 2019 (aged 85); Napa, California, U.S.
- Occupations: Buisnessman; football player
- Years active: 1954–1984
- Title: President, CEO and COO of The Walt Disney Company (1980–1984)
- Term: 1980–1984
- Predecessor: Card Walker
- Successor: Michael Eisner; Frank Wells
- Spouse: Diane Disney (m. 1954; died 2013)
- Children: 7
- Relatives: Disney family (by marriage)
- Football career

No. 89
- Position: End

Personal information
- Listed height: 6 ft 4 in (1.93 m)
- Listed weight: 200 lb (91 kg)

Career information
- High school: John C. Fremont
- College: USC

Career history
- Los Angeles Rams (1956)

Career statistics
- Receptions: 11
- Receiving yards: 129
- Receiving touchdowns: 0
- Stats at Pro Football Reference

Ronald William Miller (April 17, 1933 – February 9, 2019) was an American businessman and professional American football player. He was president and CEO of The Walt Disney Company from 1980 to 1984 and was president of the board of directors of the Walt Disney Family Museum. Miller was the son-in-law of Walt Disney.

== Early life and education ==
Ronald William Miller was born near Los Angeles. His mother, Stella (Bennett), worked in a candy factory and his father, John W. Miller, was a tire salesman who emigrated from Canada before his son's birth.

He attended the University of Southern California where he played on the Trojan Football Team and was initiated into the Sigma Chi fraternity.

=== Football ===
Miller then served in the Army and played professional football before he was knocked unconscious during a game, one where Walt Disney was in attendance. Miller told entertainment reporter Dale Pollock in August 1984:

My father-in-law saw me play in two football games when I was with the Los Angeles Rams. In one of them, I caught a pass and Dick 'Night Train' Lane let me have it from the rear. His forearm came across my nose and knocked me unconscious. I woke up in about the third quarter. At the end of the season, Walt came up to me and said, 'You know, I don't want to be the father to your children. You're going to die out there. How about coming to work with me?' I did and it was a wise decision on my part. I'm really very proud of having been a professional athlete. I think it teaches you to be competitive, to accept challenges and to see things through. I realize the image some people have of jocks, but I think that certainly has changed over the years,

== Career ==
=== Early career and work at Disney ===
Miller initially worked at Walt Disney Productions for a few months in 1954 as a liaison between WED Enterprises and Disneyland before he was drafted into the Army later that year. When he came home from the Army, he played professional football, however later he was prompted by Walt Disney to return to work for him.

Disney sponsored his son-in-law and got him into the Screen Director's Guild and Miller worked as a second assistant on Old Yeller (1957). He soon rose up the ranks to a variety of producer positions and also directed some of Disney lead-ins for the popular weekly Disney television series.

In 1958, Clint Walker walked out of the popular Warner Bros. television western Cheyenne for a variety of reasons. Bill Orr, who was Jack L. Warner's son-in-law, called in Miller to audition as Walker's replacement, and was impressed enough to schedule a screen test. Disney stepped in and told Miller to forget acting, that Disney was grooming him for the position of producer. Walker resolved his differences with Warner Bros. and returned to the show in 1959. As a result, Miller never attempted acting again.

Instead, Miller spent his time in the film division and his co-producer credits appear on such Disney films as Son of Flubber (1963), Summer Magic (1963), and That Darn Cat! (1965). His first movie with full producer credit was Never a Dull Moment (1968). In 1968, he became vice president and also executive producer of all Disney films and television films.

Miller was credited as executive producer on films including Ride a Northbound Horse (1969), My Dog, the Thief (1969), Secrets of the Pirate's Inn (1969), Menace on the Mountain (1970), The Strange Monster of Strawberry Cove (1971), Escape to Witch Mountain (1975), Freaky Friday (1976), The Rescuers (1977), Pete's Dragon (1977), The Fox and the Hound (1981), Tron (1982), and The Black Cauldron (1985). In 1976, Miller became executive vice president in charge of production and current affairs.

=== President of Walt Disney Productions ===
Miller became president of Walt Disney Productions in 1980 and CEO in 1983. Miller pushed the company to expand and explore, creating the Touchstone Films label and The Disney Channel in 1983. Miller was an innovator—experimenting in early computer animation with films such as Tron (1982); funding an upstart Tim Burton for stop-motion animation shorts Vincent (1982) and Frankenweenie (1984); and planting the seeds for future projects, including Who Framed Roger Rabbit (1988). When asked why he fostered the creation of the Touchstone Films label, he said:

One day, Walt called and said 'I've got a film I'm running tonight, why don't you come on over?' So, Diane and I, we went over there. The film was To Kill a Mockingbird. When it was over, Walt said, 'Damn. I wish I could make a film like that.' But, he couldn't.

Under Miller's leadership, Disney became the target of corporate raiders and takeover attempts, drawing criticism from many influential shareholders. In 1984, fellow Disney family member Roy E. Disney (son of Walt Disney's brother Roy), Stanley Gold, and shareholder Sid Bass ousted Miller in favor of a trio of non-Disney executives, Michael Eisner, Frank Wells, and Jeffrey Katzenberg.

=== Silverado Vineyards Winery ===
After Miller left The Walt Disney Company in 1984, he and Diane resettled in the Napa Valley which became their permanent home. They established Silverado Vineyards in 1981, four years after the first acreage was purchased near the small town of Yountville, California. They championed environmental efforts in wine making, including helping to restore local riverbanks and creek beds and adopting solar power and hybrid-engine technology in the wine industry.

== Personal life and death ==
As a student-athlete, Miller was introduced to 20-year-old student Diane Disney on a blind date after playing in a football game. They married in a small Episcopal church ceremony in Santa Barbara on May 9, 1954. Together, the couple had seven children: Christopher, Joanna, Tamara, Jennifer (later Miller-Goff), Walter, Ronald, and Patrick. Miller became a widower in November 2013, when Diane died.

Miller died from congestive heart failure at the age of 85 in Napa, California on February 9, 2019.

== Accolades ==
Emmy Awards

- 1966: Nominated, "Outstanding Children's Program" – Walt Disney's Wonderful World of Color
- 1969: Nominated, "Outstanding Achievement in Children's Programming – Programs" – Walt Disney's Wonderful World of Color
- 1970: Nominated, "Outstanding Achievement in Children's Programming – Programs" – The Wonderful World of Disney
- 1971: Won, "Special Classification of Outstanding Program and Individual Achievement – Programs" – The Wonderful World of Disney
- 1972: Nominated, "Special Classification of Outstanding Program and Individual Achievement – General Programming" – The Wonderful World of Disney
- 1977: Nominated, "Special Classification of Outstanding Program Achievement" – The Wonderful World of Disney

== See also ==
- List of celebrities who own wineries and vineyards

Business positions
Preceded by Card Walker	Disney CEO; 1983–1984	Succeeded by Michael Eisner
Preceded by Card Walker	Disney COO; 1980–1984	Succeeded by Frank Wells
Preceded by Card Walker	Disney President; 1980–1984	Succeeded by Frank Wells
