= Funeral for an Assassin =

- Original film poster
- Directed by: Ivan Hall
- Written by: Walter Brough (writer)
- Produced by: Walter Brough (producer); Ivan Hall (producer)
- Cinematography: Koos Roets
- Edited by: George Hivley
- Release date: 1974 (South Africa)
- Running time: 92 minutes
- Country: South Africa
- Language: English / Afrikaans

Funeral for an Assassin is a 1974 South African film noir directed by Ivan Hall.

The film, an Apartheid-era production, was also distributed in the United States.

== Plot ==
Michael Cardiff is a professional revolutionary highly trained in a variety of techniques of assassination, infiltration and evading law enforcement. After escaping from prison he places identification items on a decomposed body to make him appear dead as he plans his revenge against the government. Cardiff uses his skills to murder a prominent judge making his death look like an accident in order to plant an improvised explosive device at his funeral attended by the movers and shakers of the regime. Only one non conformist police captain is on to his plans.

== Cast ==
- Vic Morrow as Michael Cardiff
- Peter Van Dissel as Capt. Evered Roos
- Gaby Getz as Julia Ivens
- Sam Williams as Umzinga
- Stuart Parker as Commandant Overbeek
- Gillian Garlick as Nurse Schoenfeld
- Siegfried Mynhardt as Judge William Whitfield
- Norman Coombes as Fourie
- Chris Bezuidenhout as Karl Yates
- Albert Raphael as Claude Ormsby
- Bruce Anderson as Prime Minister
- Henry Vaughn as Reverend Martin Hemsley
- Gwynne Davies as Magdalena Stewart
- Nimrod Motchabane as Black Policeman
- John Boulter as Surgeon
- DeWet Van Rooyen as Minister
- Michael Lovegrove as D.I.S. Inspector
- Johan Brewis as T.V. Announcer
- Michael Jameson as D.I.S. Agent

== Reception ==
"Morrow disguised in blackface! Lee’s pro-colonial and apartheid movies are too numerous to mention. Topar Films then Media video falsely advertised it as a horror movie.", noted Psychotronic, expressing surprise at the fact that the film had been frequently broadcast, including on The Discovery Channel.
