= My Kind of Town =

1964 Heusen & Cahn song sung by Sinatra

Single by Frank Sinatra

from the album Sinatra '65: The Singer Today
- B-side: "I Like To Lead When I Dance"
- Released: May 1964
- Recorded: April 8, 1964
- Studio: Los Angeles
- Genre: Vocal jazz; swing; traditional pop
- Length: 3:25
- Label: Reprise Records
- Songwriters: Sammy Cahn and Jimmy Van Heusen

Frank Sinatra singles chronology
"Stay With Me (Theme From The Cardinal)" (1963)	"My Kind of Town" (1964)	"Softly, As I Leave You" (1964)

"My Kind of Town" or "My Kind of Town (Chicago Is)" is a popular song composed by Jimmy Van Heusen, with lyrics by Sammy Cahn.

The song was originally part of the musical score for Robin and the 7 Hoods, a 1964 musical film starring several members of the Rat Pack. It was nominated for the 1964 Academy Award for Best Original Song but lost to "Chim Chim Cher-ee" from Mary Poppins. Although the song predated the Grammy Award Best Original Song for a Motion Picture category, the entire score was nominated for the 1964 Grammy Award in the category Best Original Score Written for A Motion Picture, but it lost to the eponymously titled Mary Poppins score.

"My Kind of Town" made a minor appearance on the U.S. pop charts, reaching #110 in 1964. It was the second of two charting songs about Chicago recorded by Sinatra. The other was "Chicago (That Toddlin' Town)" from 1957, which reached U.S. #84.

Frank Sinatra recorded several versions which have appeared on many of his albums. Also, many artists have performed the song as a tribute to Sinatra in posthumous tribute albums. In addition, the song had been recorded by many other artists prior to Sinatra's death. The lyrics, which praise the city of Chicago for its people and institutions, repeat the title phrase several times, usually in a line that says "My kind of town, Chicago is".

== Versions ==
The original context of the song, in the film Robin and the 7 Hoods, is the mob boss Robbo (Sinatra) having just been acquitted of murdering the sheriff, a crime for which he had been framed. He walks out of the courthouse and joyously sings the song in gratitude to the gathered crowd of Chicagoans. The people eventually join in the singing. Instrumental versions of the song make up the opening and closing credits, and a dance band also plays the song in Robbo's speakeasy.

Popularized by Sinatra, "My Kind of Town" was originally recorded on April 8, 1964, in Los Angeles, California. The official B-side song was "I Like To Lead When I Dance". The song was recorded as a 45 on Reprise Records. The sheet music was copyrighted and published by Sergeant Music Co., Glorste Inc. and Van Heusen Music Corp. The music is written in the key of A-flat, in 2/2 meter (known as cut time) with an allegro tempo.

Sinatra recorded "My Kind of Town" twice in a studio setting, and two live versions were officially released, on Sinatra at the Sands (1966) and The Main Event – Live (1974). One of the more famous bootleg recordings is a concert of May 22, 1968, at the Oakland Coliseum. On the 1966 album Sinatra at the Sands, the song appears both as the 20th and 22nd (final) track. However, the final track is merely a one-minute reprise. On the 1994 album Duets II, Sinatra sings with his son, Frank Sinatra Jr., as the 13th of 14 tracks with a length of 2:36.

Sinatra would occasionally alter the lyrics slightly. In early versions, when the Union Stock Yards (which closed in 1971) still existed, one of the final lines was "The Union Stock Yards, Chicago is...". In later versions, this line is replaced with "The Chicago Cubbies, Chicago is". In the version sung by Sinatra at The Sands, Las Vegas, in 1966, the line is replaced with "The jumpin' pump room, Chicago is...", alluding to The Pump Room restaurant in Chicago. The song also appears on The Ultimate Rat Pack Collection: Live & Swingin', a 2003 DVD and CD release of the 1965 "Frank Sinatra Spectacular" benefit concert. However, since the concert takes place in St. Louis, Missouri, the lyrics were altered to reflect St. Louis as the town in Sinatra's affections.

Recording Date	Company	Format	Album	Track:Album	Album Date	Collaborators	Arranged by
1964-04-08	Reprise Records	Studio	Sinatra '65: The Singer Today	6/11:1/1	June 1965		Nelson Riddle
1966-02-01	Reprise Records	Live (The Sands Hotel, Las Vegas)	Sinatra at the Sands	20/22:1/1, 22/22:1/1	1966-10-18	the Count Basie Band	Adapted by Quincy Jones
1974-10-13	Reprise Records	Live	The Main Event – Live	11/12:1/1	October 1974	Woody Herman & The Young Thundering Herd	Nelson Riddle
1993-07-09	Capitol Records	Electronic Duet	Duets II	13/14:1/1	1994-11-15	Frank Sinatra Jr.	Nelson Riddle

Although some sources say the song was arranged by Nelson Riddle (who had scored Robin and the 7 Hoods), the "Sinatra Reprise: Very Good Years" Album Cover credits Billy May as the arranger.

The following is a list of notable compilation albums with Sinatra's versions of the song:

1. Sinatra: Vegas
2. Oakland Coliseum Concert: May 22, 1968
3. A Man and His Music
4. Sinatra at the Sands
5. The Reprise Collection
6. Frank Sinatra in Hollywood 1940-1964
7. Robin and the 7 Hoods
8. The Complete Reprise Studio Recordings
9. The Main Event – Live
10. Duets II (DVD)
Less notable albums

Other less notable albums including the Song are

1. Ultimate Legends: Frank Sinatra
2. A Night on the Town With the Rat Pack
3. My Way: The Best of Frank Sinatra
4. Sings the Songs of Van Heusen & Cahn
5. The Rat Pack on Stage: Las Vegas/St. Louis
6. The Very Best of Frank Sinatra
7. Rat Pack: Live & Cool
8. Sinatra in Hollywood 1940-1964
9. Sinatra!
10. Man and His Music 3
11. Sinatra Reprise: The Very Good Years
12. Duets/Duets II: 90th Birthday Limited Collector's Edition
13. Rat Pack: From Vegas to St. Louis
14. My Way: The Best of Frank Sinatra
15. Live and Swingin': The Ultimate Rat Pack Collection
16. The Best Duets
17. Most Famous Hits (DVD)

== Awards ==
=== Academy Awards ===
The song was one of 26 for which Cahn was nominated for an Academy Award as a writer and one of 14 for which Van Heusen was nominated as a composer. Both won 4 Academy Awards and 3 of them as a team. The April 5, 1965 37th Academy Awards was the last of four times Cahn was nominated for two songs in the same year, and the second of two times for Van Heusen. It was the only time that they had two songs nominated as a team, with the other being "Where Love Has Gone" from Where Love Has Gone sung by Jack Jones. In addition to the winner, "Chim Chim Cher-ee" from Mary Poppins, other songs nominated in 1964 were "Dear Heart from Dear Heart and "Hush...Hush, Sweet Charlotte" from Hush...Hush, Sweet Charlotte.

=== Grammy Awards ===
The Grammy Awards did not have a Best Song Written for a Motion Picture category until 1988. However, the entire score was nominated for Best Original Score Written for A Motion Picture or Television Show in the April 13, 1965 7th Grammy Awards ceremony for 1964 musical accomplishments where it lost to the Mary Poppins score. Other credited vocalists on the score were Dean Martin, Bing Crosby, and Sammy Davis Jr. It also competed against A Hard Day's Night, Goldfinger and The Pink Panther in this category.

== Related songs ==
Aaron Tippin sings a song with different lyrics by the same name. Frank Sinatra sings a popular version of "Chicago (That Toddlin' Town)" that charted and was the B-side to the 1957 Academy Award for Best Original Song winner, "All the Way".

On Ruby Braff's 1981 tribute album, Very Sinatra he does a medley called "New York, New York/My Kind Of Town (Chicago Is)". On Barry Manilow's 1998 album Manilow Sings Sinatra, he includes a 3:00 version of the song.

Jack Jones, who won two Grammy Awards in the 1960s and charted dozens of songs including the theme from The Love Boat, recorded an album entitled My Kind of Town with a title track by the same name. Among the other artists who have recorded versions of the song are Ray Anthony, Count Basie (twice), Ray Conniff, Marvin Gaye, Jackie Gleason, Jeff Harnar, Biréli Lagrène, Steve Lawrence, Julie London, Frankie Randall (several times. In addition several albums by the Rat Pack, multiple karaoke albums and dozens of Frank Sinatra albums have versions of the song.
