= Sonny King (singer) =

American singer

- Born: Luigi Antonio Schiavone; April 1, 1922; Brooklyn, New York
- Died: February 3, 2006 (aged 83) Las Vegas, Nevada
- Occupations: Lounge Singer, Actor
- Instrument: Vocals
- Years active: 1952–2006
- Formerly of: Jimmy Durante, Dean Martin

Sonny King (April 1, 1922 – February 3, 2006) was an American lounge singer of Italian descent.

He was born as Luigi Antonio Schiavone on April 1, 1922, in Brooklyn, New York. He was the sidekick of Jimmy Durante for 28 years until Durante's death in 1980. They appeared together on The Ed Sullivan Show five times in the 1960s. King shared a New York apartment with Dean Martin when the two were struggling entertainers, and is credited with introducing Martin to a young comedian Jerry Lewis.

Although not an official Rat Pack member, he was close friends with many Rat Pack entertainers and appeared in movies such as Robin and the Seven Hoods and Sergeants 3. He recorded an album "For Losers Only" and shared the stage with jazz greats such as Louis Armstrong, Lena Horne, Joe Williams and many more. King moved to Las Vegas in the early 1950s and was a fixture on the strip and local clubs until his death on February 3, 2006, from cancer. He was 83 years old.

King was brought up in vaudeville and trained in operatic vocals and comedy. He combined these elements performing as a lounge singer in Vegas.

Sonny had seven children: Thomas Stephens, Michael Stephens, Craig Unger, Shannon Ward, Antoinette Schiavone, Louis Schiavone II and Christopher Schiavone.

== Discography ==
Year	Title	Label	Format	notes
1951	If You Were Mine/ No More	London	78 RPM	Recorded in November 1950. King had been performing in London for much of 1950 after being scouted while performing at Leon and Eddie's Sunday celebrity night.
1953	Crazily/She's Just an Old Memr'y Now	Nocturne	78 RPM	Nocturne's first release; Songs written by Jimmy Krondes, the label co-founder.
1955	So Doggone Lonely/You Shouldn't	Nocturne	45 RPM	Nocturne 1003; Songs written by Jimmy Krondes.
1959	For Losers Only	Colpix	LP	CP 402; Arrangements by Johnny Williams (aka John Williams)
1959	You're Nobody Till Somebody Loves You/ Masquerade	Colpix	45 RPM	CP 107; Single from "For Losers Only"
1959	Am I Blue/ (I'm Afraid) The Masquerade is Over	Pye	45 RPM	PP-013; Australian single from "For Loser's Only"
1961	Jimmy Durante "At the Copacabana"	Roulette	LP	R-25123; Live album recorded at the Copacabana. Sonny sang in Durante's live act on this album sang medleys of: My Loving Melody Man/Ragtime Daddy/I Love You, I Do and We're Going Home/Who Will Be With You/Don't Talk About Us When We Are Gone/You Made Me Love You.

== Filmography ==
Year	Title	Role	Notes
1962	Sergeants 3	Corporal	
1964	Robin and the Seven Hoods	Robbo's Hood #2	
1991	Mission: Killfast	Murak	
