= Maurice Manson =

Canadian actor (1917–1993)

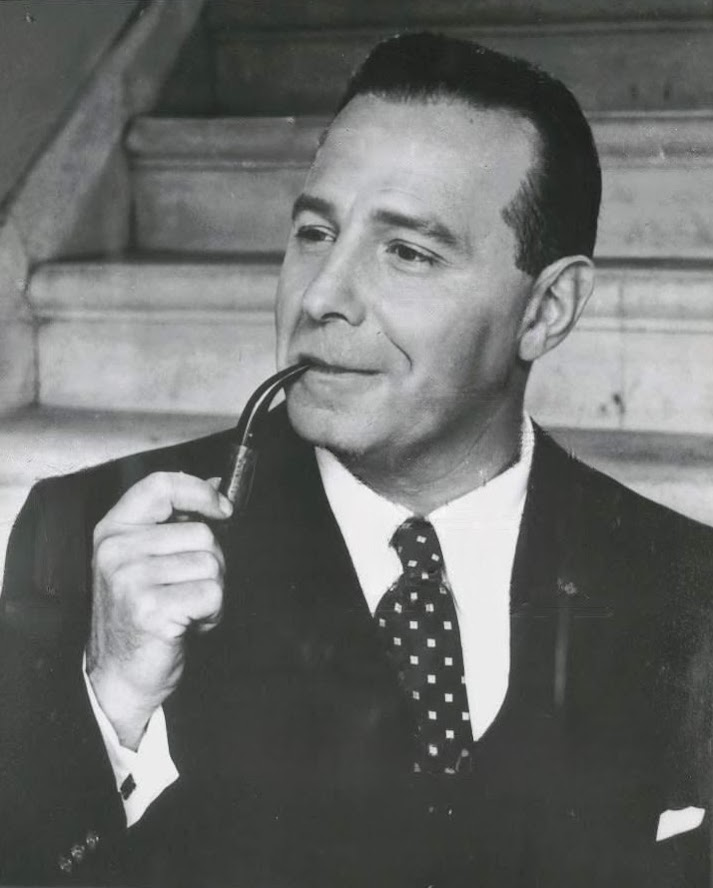
- Manson in 1957
- Born: Moritz Levine; January 31, 1913; Toronto, Ontario, Canada
- Died: September 21, 2002 (aged 89)
- Occupation: Actor
- Years active: 1932–1982

Maurice Manson (born Moritz Levine, January 31, 1913 – September 21, 2002) was a Canadian character actor who appeared in several film and Broadway productions as well as numerous television appearances in a career spanning over thirty years.

== Early years ==
Manson was born in Toronto, Ontario. During World War II he was an Army medical photographer in Europe.

== Career ==
Manson moved to New York City to become an actor and worked steadily on and off Broadway throughout the 1930s and into the 1940s. Among his credits were productions of Othello and Macbeth at the Barrymore Theater. In the 1950s, he moved to Hollywood, California, and was cast mostly in small roles. He appeared in films such as Hellcats of the Navy and The Spirit of St. Louis.

On television, he guest-starred on five episodes of the CBS legal drama, Perry Mason, starring Raymond Burr, including the role of murder victim Charles Sabin (and his brother Arthur) in "The Case of the Perjured Parrot," murder victim Joseph Kraft in "The Case of the Bogus Books," and as Jess Parkinson in "The Case of the Dead Ringer" in which Burr played dual roles as Mason and murderer Grimes. He portrayed Mayor Orson Stillman in "The Case of the Bullied Bowler" and Dr. Grandby in "The Case of Demure Defendant". He appeared five times on the NBC sitcom, Hazel, starring Shirley Booth. He also appeared on The Americans, Alfred Hitchcock Presents, Leave It to Beaver, Dennis the Menace, The Munsters, and Gunsmoke (S1E20 & S1E31).

== Broadway roles ==
- Mary of Scotland (1933) as a page and as Graeme a sergeant

== Film roles ==
Year	Title	Role	Notes
1948	Close-Up	Inspector Lonigan	Uncredited
1956	Maigret dirige l'enquête	Maigret	
1956	The Creature Walks Among Us	Dr. Borg	
1956	Navy Wife	Captain Arwin	
1956	Autumn Leaves	Dr. Masterson	
1956	The Boss	Earl Bentley	Uncredited
1956	The Solid Gold Cadillac	Company Lawyer	Uncredited
1956	The Wrong Man	District Attorney John Hall	Uncredited
1957	The Undead	Professor Ulbrecht Olinger	
1957	Public Pigeon No. 1	Mr. Forbes	Uncredited
1957	Kelly and Me	Mr. Johnson	
1957	The Girl in the Kremlin	Count Molda / Joseph Stalin	
1957	The Spirit of St. Louis	E. Lansing Ray, Editor, St. Louis Globe-Democrat	Uncredited
1957	Hellcats of the Navy	Vice-Admiral Charles A. Lockwood	Uncredited
1957	The Unholy Wife	Mr. Brown	Uncredited
1958	Hell's Five Hours	Dr. Howard Culver	
1958	Life Begins at 17	Dean Tilling	Uncredited
1959	Porgy and Bess	Coroner	
1959	Beloved Infidel	Jack Hellman	Uncredited
1960	Shadow of the Boomerang		
1962	The Three Stooges in Orbit	Mr. Lansing	
1963	Wall of Noise	Judge	Uncredited
1964	Robin and the 7 Hoods	Dignitary	Uncredited
1965	Bus Riley's Back in Town	Simmons	Uncredited
1966	The Chase	Moore	
1966	The Oscar	Captain	Uncredited
1967	Doctor, You've Got to Be Kidding!	Psychiatrist	Uncredited
1976	Nickelodeon	Stage Performer	

== Selected television appearances ==
- Alfred Hitchcock Presents (1959) (Season 5 Episode 6: "Anniversary Gift") as Mailman
- Alfred Hitchcock Presents (1960) (Season 5 Episode 19: "Not the Running Type") as Ship Passenger
- Alfred Hitchcock Presents (1960) (Season 5 Episode 23: "Craig's Will") as Hunter
- Alfred Hitchcock Presents (1960) (Season 6 Episode 8: "O Youth and Beauty!") as Archie
- The Alfred Hitchcock Hour (1962) (Season 1 Episode 4: "I Saw the Whole Thing") as Doctor
- Leave It To Beaver (1961) (Season 5 Episode 7: "Beaver Takes a Drive") as Traffic Court Judge
