= Maggie Carver =

British businesswoman (born 1964)

Maggie Carver CBE

Personal details
- Born: Margaret Adela Miriam Hall; 10 July 1964 (age 62) Sutton-on-Hull
- Spouse: William Carver
- Children: Siena, Rachel
- Education: St Edmund Hall, Oxford
- Profession: Businesswoman

Margaret Adela Miriam Carver CBE DL (née Hall; born 10 July 1964) is an English businesswoman. She is currently Interim Chair and Deputy Chair of the Information Commission, and prior to that was Interim and Deputy Chairman of Ofcom, and Chair of its Content Board. She was the first woman Chairman of national and international news producer ITN, leading horseracing organisation, the RCA, and the British Board of Film Classification. She has more than thirty years of experience as a non-executive director on the boards of twenty organisations, chairing seven, and chairing or participating in numerous audit and risk, remuneration and nominations committees. These organisations are mainly commercial but span publicly quoted companies, not for profit and government owned.

== Early life ==
Carver was born in Sutton-on-Hull, Yorkshire, to Ivan Hall (1933−2026), an architectural historian, and Elisabeth Liebeschuetz, a Jewish refugee from Nazi Germany. She was brought up in Beverley, where she attended Beverley High School. She later studied at St Edmund Hall, Oxford, where she received a Master of the Arts degree in biochemistry.

At school she gained a county scholarship to study the flute with David Butt, principal flute at the BBC Symphony Orchestra. In 1986, she studied the flute at the Paris Conservatoire, and subsequently gained an ARCM from the Royal College of Music in that instrument. She set up a professional wind quintet “Heirs and Graces”. She was a keen sportswoman, representing her school, county and Oxford University. While at school she trained with Olympic long-jumper, Sue Hearnshaw at the Hull Spartan Athletics Club.

== Career ==
After leaving St Edmund Hall, Oxford University, on the advice of her mentor, Lord Moser, Carver began a career in investment banking working for SG Warburg (now UBS), firstly in the Banking Division, then as an analyst at SG Warburg Securities in Tokyo, and subsequently in Corporate Finance. After leaving SG Warburg, she worked for Clive Hollick, Baron Hollick, Chief Executive of MAI plc (now Informa plc) in corporate and strategic affairs, during which time she helped establish and was on the executive board of Meridian Broadcasting, and joined the boards of Sports Information Services (SIS), and Paris Bourse listed Avenir Havas Media SA. She then worked as CEO of Global Television Services, a television production and outside broadcasting company with a wide range of mainly sports clients, including Sky football and Channel 4 Racing. Between 2006 and 2017, she was CEO and joint owner of Carver Care and Mobility, an entrepreneurial online and retail mobility and disability specialist. Alongside her executive roles, she developed a non-executive portfolio, serving on the boards of Sporting Index (Holdings) plc, Link Licensing Limited, Channel Five, SDN Limited, RDF Media Group plc, British Waterways, the Eden Project, Services Sound and Vision Corporation, the Horserace Betting Levy Board, and the British Horseracing Authority. She has served as Chairman of the British Board of Film Classification (BBFC), outside broadcaster and media tech operator Race Tech, ITN, the RCA (inter alia, representing and negotiating on behalf of British racecourses as part of the decision making tripartite industry body, and running a major outside broadcasting and media company), digital multiplex operator SDN. and the Licoricia of Winchester Appeal. Most recently, during her long period as Interim Chair of Ofcom she led the preparations for online safety regulation, working closely with DCMS, Government and stakeholders.

Carver was appointed Commander of the Order of the British Empire (CBE) in the 2021 New Year Honours for services to sport and the media sector, a Deputy Lieutenant of Hampshire (DL) in September 2022, and an Honorary Fellow of the University of Winchester in October 2024 for her interfaith work.

== Other appointments ==
Carver is a Pro-Chancellor of the University of Winchester, and Chair of the Licoricia of Winchester Appeal. She has served on the Advisory Council of the Rehearsal Orchestra, and governor of the Colville Nursery School in North Kensington. She is an honorary member of Vincent's Club, Oxford.

== Family ==
Married to William Carver, whom she met at St Edmund Hall, Oxford, she has two children.
