= Some Nice Things I've Missed =

Studio album by Frank Sinatra
- Released: July 1974
- Recorded: December 10, 1973 – May 24, 1974, Hollywood
- Genre: Traditional pop
- Length: 28:52
- Label: Reprise; F 2195
- Producer: Don Costa (tracks: A1, A2, A4 to B1, B4, B5), Jimmy Bowen (tracks: B3), Sonny Burke (tracks: A3, B2)

Frank Sinatra chronology
Ol' Blue Eyes Is Back (1973)	Some Nice Things I've Missed (1974)	The Main Event – Live (1974)

Professional ratings
Review scores
Source	Rating
AllMusic	2/5 stars
Mojo	1/5 stars

Some Nice Things I've Missed is a 1974 album by American singer Frank Sinatra. Consisting mainly of songs made popular by other artists, the album's title reflects that Sinatra was catching up on songs that came out while he was in retirement from 1971 to 1973.

== In popular culture ==
In the December 1974 Kojak episode Cross Your Heart and Hope to Die, Frank Sinatra is mentioned several times by Greg (George Shannon), the soon-to-be-murdered victim, while in his apartment attempting to seduce his date. He then puts on a Sinatra record but the music is not heard. In an attempt to solve the crime, Kojak (Telly Savalas) mentions Sinatra several more times during the episode. Halfway through the program, he enters the police department holding a copy of Some Nice Things I've Missed and throws the record on a desk as he begins a conversation with other officers. Meanwhile, Sgt. Stavros (Telly's real-life brother George Savalas) sits on the desk without paying attention to what's underneath. Before leaving the office, Kojak turns to Stavros and says "Fatso, you're sittin' on Old Blue Eyes". Unnerved, Stavros picks up the vinyl and hands it over to Kojak before walking out. In the next scene, Kojak arrives at the apartment of Lisa Walden (Andrea Marcovicci), still holding the album, and tells her "I brought you a Frank Sinatra album". Coincidentally, Telly Savalas also recorded a cover of the song "If" (as Sinatra did on this album), which was released as a single only three months later.

== Track listing ==
Side One
No.	Title	Writer(s)	Length
1.	"You Turned My World Around"	Bert Kaempfert, Herbert Rehbein, Kim Carnes, Dave Ellingson	2:50
2.	"Sweet Caroline"	Neil Diamond	2:44
3.	"The Summer Knows"	Alan and Marilyn Bergman, Michel Legrand	2:44
4.	"I'm Gonna Make It All the Way"	Floyd Huddleston	2:54
5.	"Tie a Yellow Ribbon Round the Ole Oak Tree"	Russell Brown, Irwin Levine	3:07

Side Two
No.	Title	Writer(s)	Length
6.	"Satisfy Me One More Time"	Floyd Huddleston	2:22
7.	"If"	David Gates	3:10
8.	"You Are the Sunshine of My Life"	Stevie Wonder	2:37
9.	"What Are You Doing the Rest of Your Life?"	Alan and Marilyn Bergman, Legrand	4:05
10.	"Bad, Bad Leroy Brown"	Jim Croce	2:49

== Charts ==
Chart (1974)	Peak position
Australia (Kent Music Report)	28

== Certifications ==
Region	Certification	Certified units/sales
United Kingdom (BPI)	Silver	60,000^{^}
^{^} Shipments figures based on certification alone.
