= River of Mystery =

- Written by: Albert Ruben
- Directed by: Paul Stanley
- Starring: Vic Morrow
- Country of origin: United States
- Original language: English

Production
- Running time: 120 minutes

Original release
- Release: October 1, 1971

River of Mystery is a 1971 television film directed by Paul Stanley and starring Vic Morrow.

== Stars ==
- Vic Morrow as Phil Munger
- Claude Akins as Dorata
- Niall MacGinnis as Garwood Drum
- Edmond O'Brien as R.J. Twitchell
- Louise Sorel as Elena
- Nico Minardos as the Alacron
