= Hell's Five Hours =

1958 film

- Theatrical release poster
- Directed by: Jack L. Copeland
- Written by: Jack L. Copeland
- Produced by: Jack L. Copeland
- Starring: Stephen McNally; Coleen Gray; Vic Morrow; Maurice Manson; Robert Foulk; Dan Sheridan
- Cinematography: Ernest Haller
- Edited by: Walter Hannemann
- Music by: Nicholas Carras
- Production company: Muriel Corporation
- Distributed by: Allied Artists Pictures
- Release date: April 13, 1958
- Running time: 80 minutes
- Country: United States
- Language: English

Hell's Five Hours is a 1958 American thriller film written, produced and directed by Jack L. Copeland. The film stars Stephen McNally, Coleen Gray, Vic Morrow, Maurice Manson, Robert Foulk and Dan Sheridan. The film was released on April 13, 1958, by Allied Artists Pictures. An industrial filmmaker and US Army combat photographer in World War II, the film was Jack L. Copeland's only mainstream feature film.

== Plot ==
Burt Nash is a labourer at a rocket fuel factory who is fired and beaten up by his foreman Jack Fife because he smoked a cigarette in a non-smoking area. Nash decides on revenge where he enters the rocket fuel factory by cutting through a security fence. Nash kills a guard, takes his service revolver and uses it to ignite one of the fuel tanks. He returns to obliterate the entire factory by making himself a human bomb with stolen dynamite after he abducts the wife and child of the head of the plant, Mike Brand to use as hostages. A plan is put into place where all the rocket fuel can be pumped out of the factory via a pipeline, but the process will take five hours. Brand is joined by an FBI Special Agent and a police psychiatrist to prevent the entire surrounding town from being destroyed by an inferno.

== Cast ==
- Stephen McNally as Mike Brand
- Coleen Gray as Nancy Brand
- Vic Morrow as Burt Nash
- Maurice Manson as Dr. Howard Culver
- Robert Foulk as Jack Fife
- Dan Sheridan as Special Agent Ken Archer
- Will J. White as Al Parker
- Robert Christopher as Bill
- Charles J. Conrad as George Knight
- Ray Ferrell as Eric Brand
