= My Way: The Best of Frank Sinatra =

Compilation album by Frank Sinatra
- Released: 1997
- Recorded: December 20, 1960 – October 30, 1986
- Genre: Traditional pop, jazz
- Length: 124:34
- Label: Reprise

Frank Sinatra chronology
| Robin and the 7 Hoods (1997) | My Way: The Best of Frank Sinatra (1997) | Love Songs (2001) |

My Way: The Best of Frank Sinatra is a compilation album by Frank Sinatra.

== Track listing ==
=== Disc one ===
1. "My Way" (Paul Anka, Claude Francois, Jacques Revaux, Gilles Thibaut) - 4:36
2. "Strangers in the Night" (Bert Kaempfert, Charles Singleton, Eddie Snyder) - 2:25
3. "Theme from New York, New York" (Fred Ebb, John Kander) - 3:26
4. "I Get a Kick Out of You" (Cole Porter) - 3:11
5. "Somethin' Stupid" with Nancy Sinatra (Carson Parks) - 2:45
6. "Moon River" (Henry Mancini, Johnny Mercer)
7. "What Now My Love" (Gilbert Bécaud, Pierre Leroyer, Carl Sigman) – 2:32
8. "Summer Wind" (Heinz Meyer, Hans Bradtke, Mercer) - 2:53
9. "For Once in My Life" (Ron Miller, Orlando Murden)
10. "Love and Marriage" (Sammy Cahn, Jimmy Van Heusen)
11. "They Can't Take That Away from Me" (George Gershwin, Ira Gershwin)
12. "My Kind of Town" (Cahn, Van Heusen) - 3:10
13. "Fly Me to the Moon (In Other Words)" (Bart Howard) - 2:30
14. "I've Got You Under My Skin" (Porter) - 3:26
15. "The Best Is Yet to Come" (Cy Coleman, Carolyn Leigh) - 3:10
16. "It Was a Very Good Year" (Ervin Drake) - 4:25
17. "Come Fly with Me" (Cahn, Van Heusen) - 3:11
18. "That's Life" (Kelly Gordon, Dean Kay Thompson) - 3:11
19. "The Girl from Ipanema" (Antonio Carlos Jobim, Norman Gimbel, Vinícius de Moraes) - 3:00
20. "The Lady Is a Tramp" (Richard Rodgers, Lorenz Hart) - 2:56 live performance at Madison Square Garden, New York City, New York, October 13, 1974
21. "Bad, Bad Leroy Brown" (Jim Croce) - 2:49
22. "Mack the Knife" (Marc Blitzstein, Bertolt Brecht, Kurt Weill) - 4:53
23. "Love's Been Good to Me" (Rod McKuen) - 3:27
24. "L.A. Is My Lady" (Alan Bergman, Marilyn Bergman, Quincy Jones, Peggy Lipton Jones) - 3:12

=== Disc two ===
1. "Let's Face the Music and Dance" (Irving Berlin) - 2:58
2. "Come Rain or Come Shine" (Harold Arlen, Mercer) - 4:05
3. "Night and Day" (Porter) - 3:37
4. "The Very Thought of You" (Ray Noble) - 3:34
5. "Pennies from Heaven" (Arthur Johnston, Johnny Burke) - 3:27
6. "Bewitched, Bothered, and Bewildered" (Rodgers, Hart) - 3:02
7. "America, the Beautiful" (Katharine Lee Bates, Samuel Ward) - 2:21
8. "All the Way" (Cahn, Van Heusen) - 3:27
9. "In the Wee Small Hours of the Morning" (David Mann, Bob Hilliard) - 2:41
10. "The Way You Look Tonight" (Dorothy Fields, Jerome Kern) - 3:22
11. "Three Coins in the Fountain" (Cahn, Jule Styne) - 3:46
12. "Softly, as I Leave You" (Hal Shaper, Antonio DeVito, Giorgio Calabrese) - 2:50
13. "All or Nothing at All" (Jack Lawrence, Arthur Altman) - 3:56
14. "Yesterday" (John Lennon, Paul McCartney) - 3:56
15. "Moonlight Serenade" (Glenn Miller, Mitchell Parish) - 3:26
16. "Somewhere My Love (Lara's Theme) (From Doctor Zhivago)" (Maurice Jarre, Paul Francis Webster) - 2:12
17. "Mrs. Robinson" (Paul Simon) - 2:55
18. "Something" (George Harrison) - 3:34
19. "You Are the Sunshine of My Life" (Stevie Wonder) - 2:37
20. "Send in the Clowns" (Stephen Sondheim) - 4:10
21. "It Had to Be You" (Isham Jones, Gus Kahn) - 3:53
22. "The Best of Everything" (Ebb, Kander) - 2:45

== Charts ==
=== Weekly charts ===
| Chart (1997–2002) | Peak position |
|---|---|
| Australian Albums (ARIA) | 15 |
| Austrian Albums (Ö3 Austria) | 9 |
| Belgian Albums (Ultratop Flanders) | 5 |
| Belgian Albums (Ultratop Wallonia) | 8 |
| Dutch Albums (Album Top 100) | 10 |
| Finnish Albums (Suomen virallinen lista) | 27 |
| German Albums (Offizielle Top 100) | 22 |
| Irish Albums (IRMA) | 4 |
| Italian Albums (FIMI) | 24 |
| New Zealand Albums (RMNZ) | 6 |
| Norwegian Albums (VG-lista) | 4 |
| Scottish Albums (OCC) | 17 |
| Spanish Albums (Promusicae) | 17 |
| Swedish Albums (Sverigetopplistan) | 7 |
| UK Albums (OCC) | 7 |

=== Year-end charts ===
| Chart (1998) | Position |
|---|---|
| Belgian Albums (Ultratop Flanders) | 60 |
| Belgian Albums (Ultratop Wallonia) | 78 |
| Dutch Albums (Album Top 100) | 89 |
| German Albums (Offizielle Top 100) | 94 |
| UK Albums (OCC) | 56 |

| Chart (2000) | Position |
|---|---|
| UK Albums (OCC) | 57 |

| Chart (2001) | Position |
|---|---|
| UK Albums (OCC) | 44 |

| Chart (2002) | Position |
|---|---|
| Austrian Albums (Ö3 Austria) | 33 |
| UK Albums (OCC) | 51 |

| Chart (2003) | Position |
|---|---|
| UK Albums (OCC) | 152 |

| Chart (2006) | Position |
|---|---|
| UK Albums (OCC) | 168 |

== Certifications ==
| Region | Certification | Certified units/sales |
|---|---|---|
| Australia (ARIA) | 2× Platinum | 140,000^{^} |
| Austria (IFPI Austria) | Gold | 25,000^{*} |
| Belgium (BRMA) | Platinum | 50,000^{*} |
| Canada (Music Canada) | 3× Platinum | 300,000^{^} |
| Germany (BVMI) | Gold | 250,000^{^} |
| Spain (Promusicae) | 2× Platinum | 200,000^{^} |
| Sweden (GLF) | Platinum | 80,000^{^} |
| United Kingdom (BPI) | 5× Platinum | 1,500,000^{^} |
Summaries
| Europe (IFPI) | 3× Platinum | 3,000,000^{*} |
^{*} Sales figures based on certification alone.^{^} Shipments figures based on certification alone.
