= Donald Sutherland (disambiguation) =

Donald Sutherland (1935–2024) was a Canadian actor.

Donald Sutherland may also refer to:

- Donald Sutherland (cricketer) (born 1949), Australian cricketer
- Donald Sutherland (explorer) (1843/1844–1919), New Zealand explorer
- Donald Sutherland (politician) (1863–1949), member of Canadian Parliament for the Oxford South riding
- Donald Matheson Sutherland (1879–1970), member of Canadian Parliament for the Oxford North riding
- Donald Sutherland, co-founder, with his wife Susan, of Cold Stone Creamery
- Donald Sutherland, a variant of the Rusty Nail cocktail
