= Twilight Zone accident =

1982 helicopter crash in California, US

Twilight Zone helicopter accident
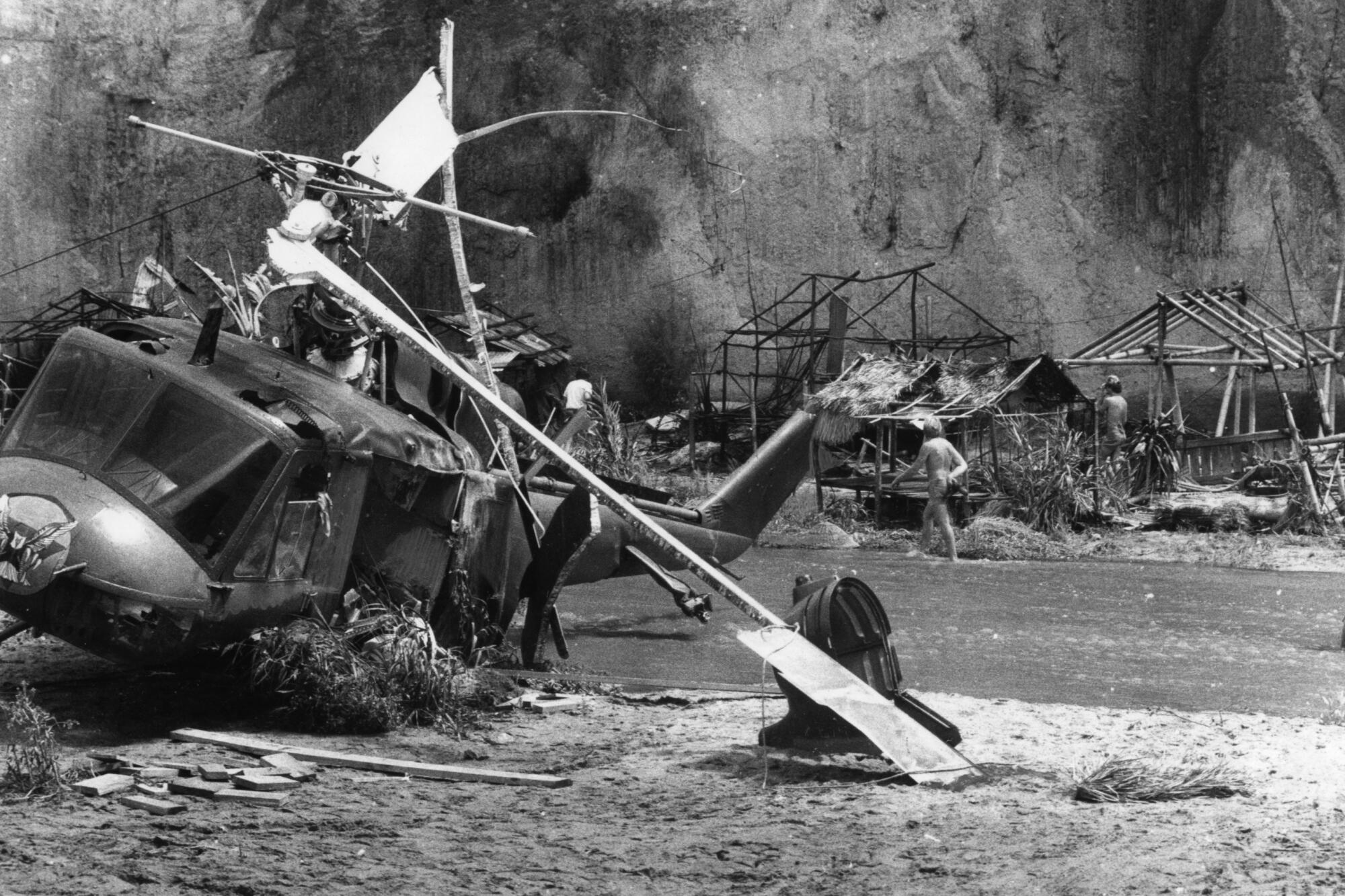
- Wreckage of the helicopter at the film set, in the aftermath of the accident

Accident
- Date: July 23, 1982
- Summary: Loss of control after tail rotor failure caused by pyrotechnics
- Site: Indian Dunes, Valencia, California, U.S.; 34°25′07″N 118°37′56″W
- Total fatalities: 3 (on ground, including Vic Morrow)
- Total injuries: 6

Aircraft
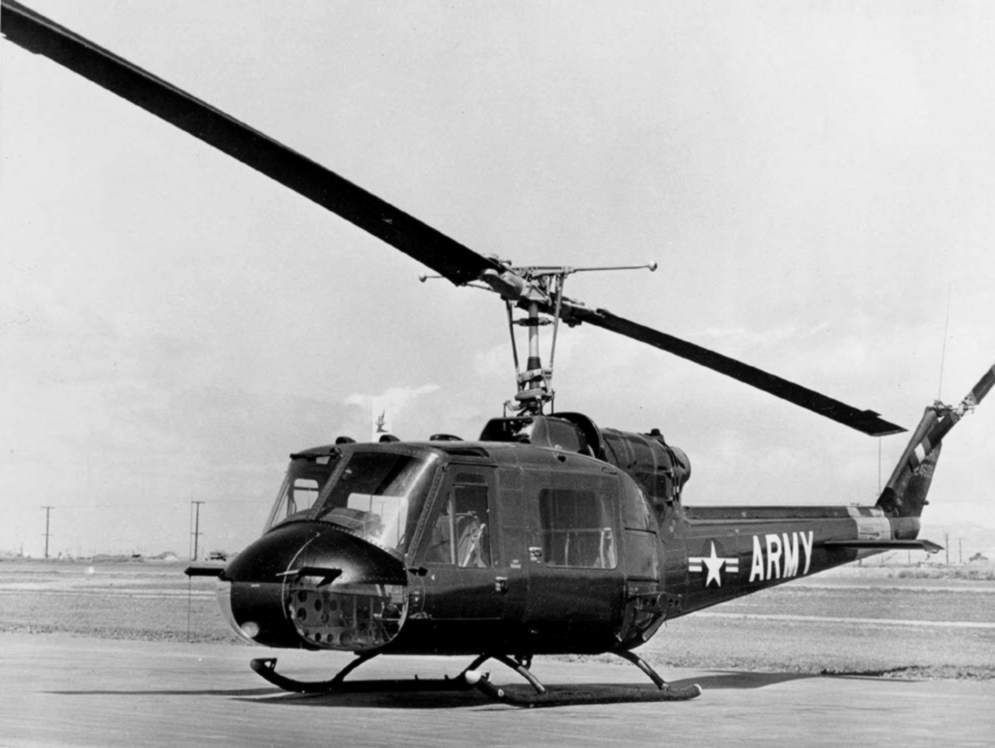
- A similar helicopter
- Aircraft type: Bell UH-1B Iroquois
- Operator: Western Helicopters Inc.
- Registration: N87701
- Occupants: 6
- Passengers: 5
- Crew: 1
- Fatalities: 0
- Injuries: 6
- Survivors: 6

Ground casualties
- Ground fatalities: 3

On July 23, 1982, a Bell UH-1 Iroquois helicopter crashed at Indian Dunes in Valencia, California, during the making of Twilight Zone: The Movie. The crash killed actor Vic Morrow and child actors Myca Dinh Le and Renee Shin-Yi Chen, who were on the ground, and injured the six helicopter passengers. It led to years of civil and criminal actions against the personnel overseeing the film shoot, including director John Landis, and the introduction of new procedures and safety standards in the American filmmaking industry.

== Background ==
Twilight Zone: The Movie featured four segments. In the script for the first segment, "Time Out", character Bill Connor (Vic Morrow) is transported back in time to the Vietnam War, where he has become a Vietnamese man protecting two children from American troops.

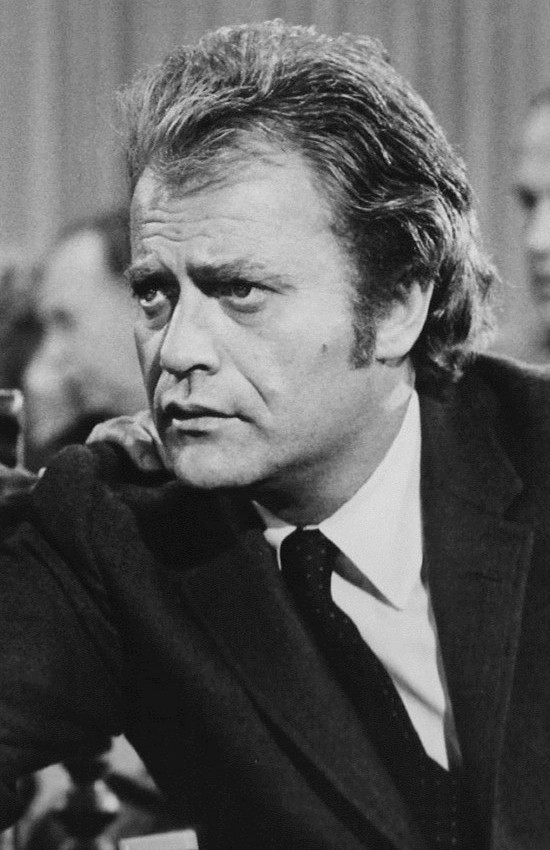
Vic Morrow

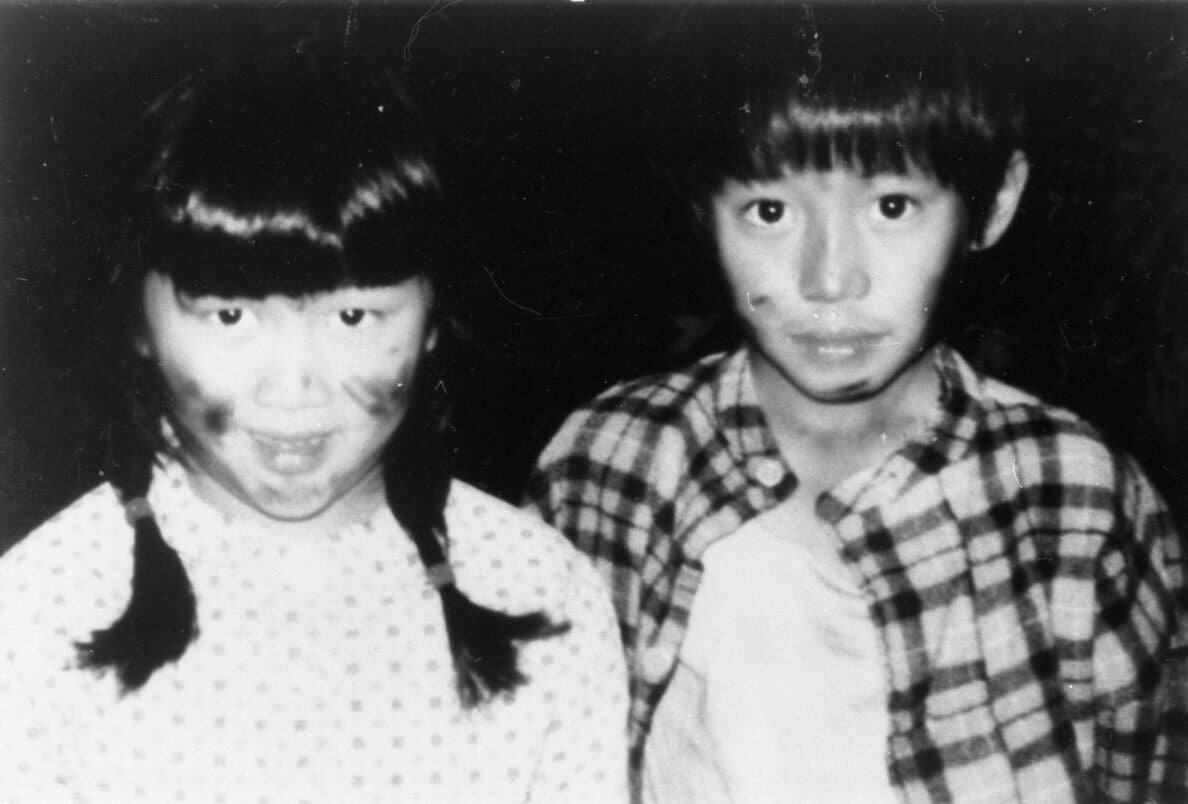
Renee Shin-Yi Chen (left) and Myca Dinh Le (right)

Filmmaker John Landis, who directed this first segment, violated California's child labor laws by hiring seven-year-old Myca Dinh Le and six-year-old Renee Shin-Yi Chen (Chinese: 陳欣怡; pinyin: Chén Xīnyí) without the required permits. Landis and members of his staff were responsible for a number of labor violations connected with other people involved in the accident, which came to light afterward.

The children were hired after Peter Wei-Teh Chen, Renee's uncle, was approached by a colleague whose wife was a production secretary for the film. Chen thought of his brother's Taiwanese-born daughter Renee, whose parents agreed to let her participate. He then called a Vietnamese colleague, Daniel Lee, who had a young son named Myca. Myca was an outgoing boy who enjoyed posing for pictures, so his parents thought he would be interested. Chen testified that he was never informed that either of the children would be working near a helicopter or explosives.

Le and Chen were being paid under the table to circumvent state law prohibiting children from working at night. Landis opted not to seek a special waiver, either because he did not think he would receive permission at such a late hour or because he knew he would not receive approval to include young children in a scene involving explosives. Casting agents were unaware that the children would be involved in the scene. Associate producer George Folsey Jr. told the children's parents not to tell any firefighters on the set that the children were part of the scene and hid them from a fire safety officer who also worked as a welfare worker. A fire safety officer was concerned that the blasts would cause a crash, but he did not tell Landis of his concerns.

== Accident ==
The filming location was Indian Dunes, a movie ranch in the Valencia neighborhood of Santa Clarita, California, that was used throughout the 1980s in films and television shows. The location was within the 30-mile (50 km) studio zone, its wide-open area permitted more pyrotechnic effects, and it was possible to shoot night scenes without city lights being visible in the background. Indian Dunes' 600 acres (240 ha) also featured a wide topography of green hills, dry desert, dense woods, and jungle-like riverbeds along the Santa Clara River which made it suitable to double for locations around the world, including Afghanistan, Myanmar, Brazil, and Vietnam.

The night scene called for Morrow's character to carry the two children out of a deserted village and across a shallow river while being pursued by American soldiers in a hovering helicopter. The helicopter was piloted by Vietnam War veteran Dorcey Wingo. During the filming, Wingo stationed his helicopter 25 ft (8 m) from the ground, while hovering near a large mortar effect; he then turned the aircraft 180 degrees to the left for the next camera shot. The effect was detonated while the helicopter's tail-rotor was still above it, the metal lid on top of the mortar striking the tail-rotor, causing the rotor to fail and detach from the tail. The low-flying helicopter spun out of control. At the same time, Morrow dropped Chen into the water. He was reaching out to grab her when the helicopter fell on top of all three of them. The right skid hit and killed Chen first, then the main rotor beheaded Morrow and Le. In an aircraft accident report, the National Transportation Safety Board subsequently wrote:

The postmortem of the adult actor and the male child actor disclosed that their deaths were attributed to injuries to the head, neck, and shoulder of each actor, inflicted by the main rotor blades of the helicopter. The cause of death to the female child actor was attributed to multiple traumatic injuries and blunt force trauma.

At the trial, the defense claimed that the explosions were detonated at the wrong time. Randall Robinson was an assistant cameraman on board the helicopter who testified that production manager Dan Allingham told Wingo, "That's too much. Let's get out of here" when the explosions were detonated, but Landis shouted over the radio: "Get lower... lower!" Robinson said that Wingo tried to leave the area, but that "we lost our control and regained it and then I could feel something let go and we began spinning around in circles." Stephen Lydecker was another camera operator on board, and he testified that Landis had earlier "shrugged off" warnings about the stunt with the comment, "We may lose the helicopter." Lydecker acknowledged that Landis' remark might have been a joke, but added, "I learned not to take anything the man said as a joke. It was his attitude. He didn't have time for suggestions from anybody."

== Investigation ==
In October 1984, the National Transportation Safety Board (NTSB) issued its report on the accident. The probable cause was the detonation of debris-laden high temperature special effects explosions too near to a low-flying helicopter, leading to foreign object damage to one rotor blade and delamination due to heat to the other rotor blade, the separation of the helicopter's tail rotor assembly, and the uncontrolled descent of the helicopter. The proximity of the helicopter to the special effects explosions was due to the failure to establish direct communications and coordination between Wingo, who was in command of the helicopter operation, and Landis, who was in charge of the filming operation.

The Federal Aviation Administration (FAA) had just instituted regulations the previous March to define how aircraft were to be regulated during film and television productions. The new regulations, however, only covered fixed-wing aircraft and not helicopters. As a result of the fatal accident, the NTSB recommended that the terms be extended to apply to all types of aircraft. In response, the FAA amended Order 8440.5A, Chapter 14, Section 5 "to clarify and emphasize that helicopter low-level movie making operations do require a certificate of waiver"; this language was officially incorporated in 1986.

== Aftermath ==
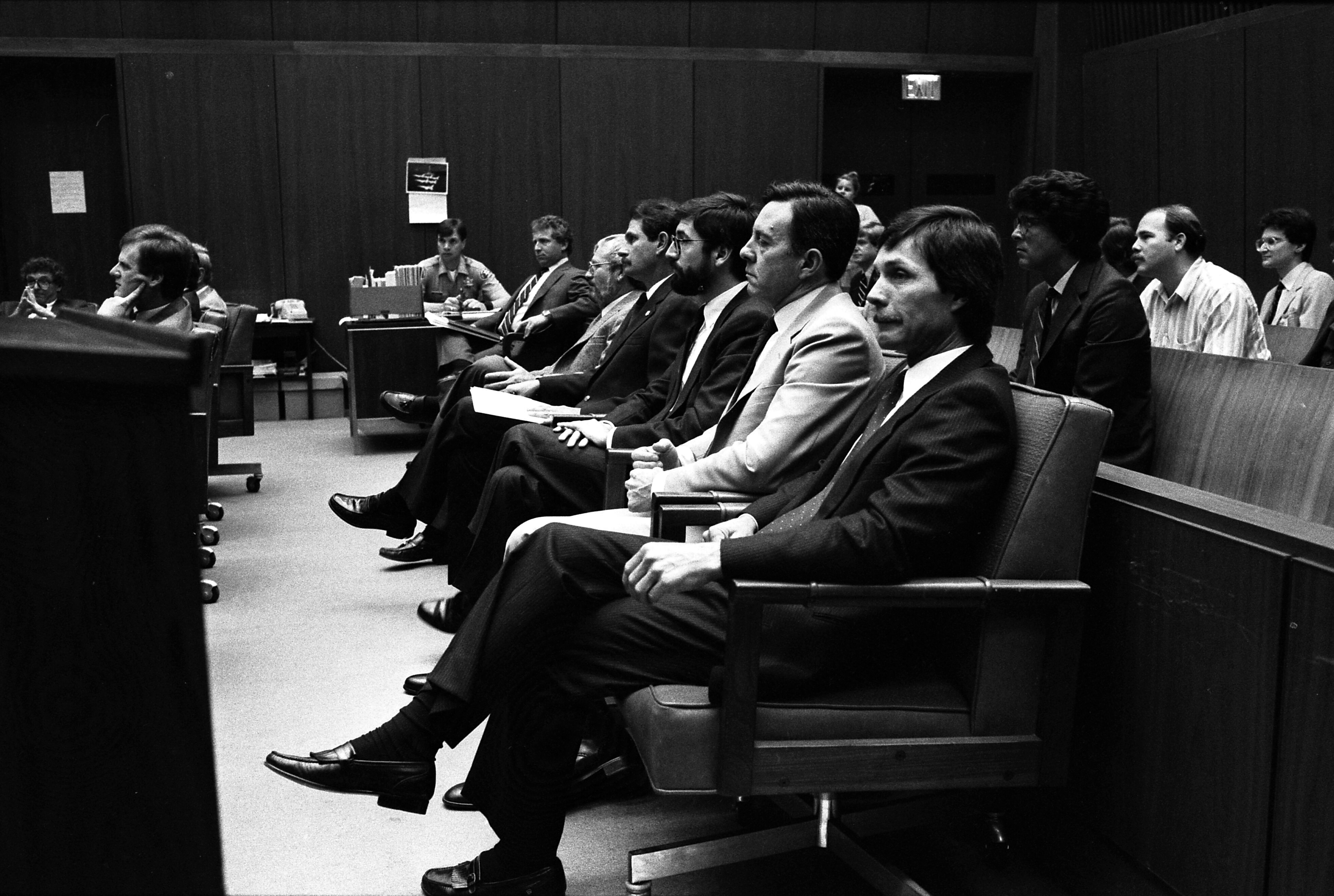
Director John Landis (center; with beard) and others on trial in 1986

The accident led to civil and criminal actions against the filmmakers that lasted nearly a decade. Le's father Daniel Lee testified that he heard Landis instructing the helicopter to fly lower. All four parents testified that they were never told that there would be helicopters or explosives on set, and they had been reassured that there would be no danger, only noise. Lee had survived the Vietnam War and immigrated with his wife to the United States, and he was horrified when the explosions began on the Vietnamese village set because it brought back memories of the war.

Landis, Folsey, Wingo, production manager Allingham, and explosives specialist Paul Stewart were tried and acquitted on charges of manslaughter in a ten-month trial in 1986 and 1987. The defense maintained that the accident was "unforeseen and unforeseeable", and that the real culprit was a crew member who set off the explosives without looking at Wingo's helicopter. No one was prosecuted for illegally hiring Le and Chen, even though Landis, Folsey, and Allingham admitted to circumventing child labor laws.

In the course of cross-examination, Wingo expressed his regret that Morrow had not looked up at the helicopter as he claimed that he had instructed him to do, stating that Morrow "had over five seconds between the time the sound of the helicopter changed and that impact." Deputy District Attorney Lea Purwin D'Agostino derided Wingo's comments, questioning how Wingo expected Morrow to have evaded the helicopter, observing that "Morrow was carrying the two youngsters in his arms while standing almost knee-deep in water as the helicopter... spun toward him."

D'Agostino called the testimony "quite amazing" and questioned how Wingo could "possibly have thought Vic Morrow could have done anything to escape that helicopter under those circumstances and conditions.... They're blaming the parents, they're blaming the fire safety officers, they're out here blaming everyone. Now they're blaming the dead man. It's incredible." Morrow's family settled within a year; the children's families collected millions of dollars from several civil lawsuits.

As a result of the accident, second assistant director Andy House had his name removed from the credits of Twilight Zone: The Movie and replaced with "Alan Smithee". It was the first time that a director was charged due to a fatality on a set. The trial was described as "long, controversial and bitterly divisive".

Screen Actors Guild (SAG) spokesman Mark Locher said at the conclusion of the trial: "The entire ordeal has shaken the industry in its bottom." Warner Bros. set up dedicated safety committees to establish acceptable standards "for every aspect of filmmaking, from gunfire to fixed-wing aircraft to smoke and pyrotechnics." The standards are regularly issued as safety bulletins and published as the Injury and Illness Prevention Program (IIPP) Safety Manual for Television & Feature Production. The IIPP manual is "a general outline of safe work practices to be used as a guideline for productions to provide a safe work environment" and is distributed to all studio employees.

The Directors Guild of America's safety committee began publishing regular safety bulletins for its members, and it established a telephone hotline to "enable directors to get quick answers to safety questions." The guild also began to discipline its members for violations of its safety procedures on sets, which it had not done before the crash. The SAG introduced a 24-hour hotline and safety team for its members and "encouraged members to use the right of refusal guaranteed in contracts if they believe a scene is unsafe." Filming accidents fell by 69.6 percent between 1982 and 1986, although there were still six deaths on sets.

In 1987, the Office of the State Fire Marshal started the Motion Picture and Entertainment Safety Program in response to the accident and to industry concerns about inconsistent enforcement of fire prevention regulations and requirements. The program oversees motion picture and television industry use of pyrotechnic special effects in California.

Landis spoke about the accident in a 1996 interview while discussing his career: "There was absolutely no good aspect about this whole story. The tragedy, which I think about every day, had an enormous impact on my career from which I may possibly never recover." Steven Spielberg had co-produced Twilight Zone: The Movie with Landis, but he broke off their friendship following the accident. Spielberg said that the crash "made me grow a little" and left everyone who worked on the movie "sick to the center of our souls." "No movie is worth dying for. I think people are standing up much more now than ever before to producers and directors who ask too much. If something isn't safe, it's the right and responsibility of every actor or crew member to yell 'Cut!'"

== In popular culture ==
The accident and criminal trial were later chronicled in episodes of both E! True Hollywood Story in 2000 and the docuseries Cursed Films in 2020.

== See also ==
- List of film and television accidents
- List of unusual deaths in the 20th century
