= The Main Event – Live =

Live album by Frank Sinatra
- Released: 1974
- Recorded: October 1974
- Genre: Traditional pop
- Length: 50:42
- Label: Reprise

Frank Sinatra chronology
Some Nice Things I've Missed (1974)	The Main Event – Live (1974)	Portrait of Sinatra – Forty Songs from the Life of a Man (1977)

Professional ratings
Review scores
Source	Rating
AllMusic	3/5 stars

The Main Event – Live is a 1974 live album and television special by American singer Frank Sinatra.

== Track listing ==
1. Overture: "It Was a Very Good Year"/"All the Way"/"My Kind of Town" (Ervin Drake)/(Sammy Cahn, Jimmy Van Heusen)/(Cahn, Van Heusen) – 3:12 (introduction by Howard Cosell)
2. "The Lady Is a Tramp" (Lorenz Hart, Richard Rodgers) – 3:02
3. "I Get a Kick Out of You" (Cole Porter) – 4:37
4. "Let Me Try Again (Laisse Moi le Temps)" (Paul Anka, Cahn, Michel Jourdon, Caravelli) – 3:26
5. "Autumn in New York" (Vernon Duke) – 2:45
6. "I've Got You Under My Skin" (Porter) – 4:44
7. "Bad, Bad Leroy Brown" (Jim Croce) – 2:49
8. "Angel Eyes" (Earl Brent, Matt Dennis) – 8:32
9. "You Are the Sunshine of My Life" (Stevie Wonder) – 2:49
10. "The House I Live In (That's America to Me)" (Lewis Allan, Earl Robinson) – 6:41
11. "My Kind of Town" – 3:01
12. "My Way" (Anka, Claude François, Jacques Revaux, Gilles Thibault) – 4:57
- Tracks 10 and 12 recorded in Boston Garden, October 2, 1974
- Tracks 6 and 8 recorded at Buffalo Memorial Auditorium, October 4, 1974
- Track 5 recorded in Madison Square Garden, October 12, 1974
- Tracks 1–4, 7, 9, and 11 recorded in Madison Square Garden, October 13, 1974

== Charts ==
Chart (1975)	Peak position
Australia (Kent Music Report)	70

== Certifications ==
Region	Certification	Certified units/sales
United Kingdom (BPI)	Silver	60,000^{^}
United States (RIAA)	Gold	500,000^{^}
^{^} Shipments figures based on certification alone.

== Personnel ==
- Frank Sinatra - Vocals
- Bill Miller - Pianist and Musical Director
- Al Viola - Guitar
- Gene Cherico - Bass
- Irving Cottler - Drums

== Woody Herman and his Thundering Herd ==
Woody Herman was not present at the concerts

- Alto Saxophone: Jerry Dodgian, Frank Tiberi
- Tenor Saxophone: Gary M. Anderson, Gregory Herbert
- Baritone Saxophone: John Oslawski
- Trumpet: Gary Pack, Nelson Hiatt, Dave Stahl, Buddy Powers, Bill Byrne
- Trombone: Urbie Green, Dale Kirkland, Jim Pugh, Vaughn Weister
- Piano: Andy LaVerne
- Bass: Ron Paley
- Drums: David Carey

== String section ==
- Violin: Joe Malin (lead violin), Peter Dimitriades, Dave Kunstler, Avram Weiss, Harry Urbont, Stan Karpienia, Max Hollander, Carmel Malin, Julius Brand, Peter Buonconsiglio, Max Cahn, Julius Schachter
- Viola: Vinnie Liota, Maurice Pollock, George Brown, Mike Spivakowsky
- Cello: Anthony Sophos, Alan Shulman, Gloria Lanzarone, Julius Ehrenworth
- Pedal Harp: Margaret Ross

Recording

- Engineered by: Ed Green
- Record Plant NY White Truck

== See also ==
- Sinatra: New York (2009): features Frank Sinatra performing at Madison Square Garden from October 12, 1974.
