= Vic Morrow =

American actor (1929–1982)

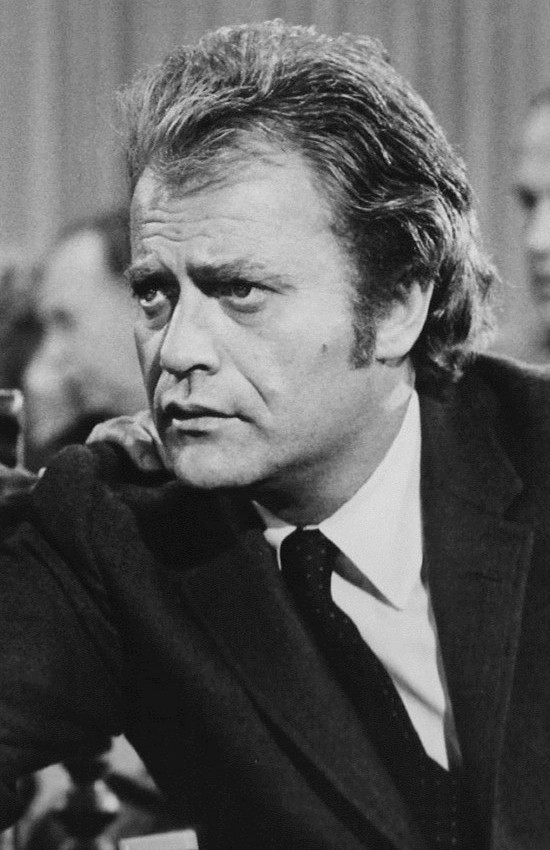
- Morrow in 1971
- Born: Victor Morozoff; February 14, 1929; New York City, U.S.
- Died: July 23, 1982 (aged 53); Valencia, California, U.S.
- Cause of death: Accidental decapitation by helicopter rotor blades
- Resting place: Hillside Memorial Park Cemetery
- Occupation: Actor
- Years active: 1955–1982
- Spouses: Barbara Turner (m. 1957; div. 1964); Gale A. Lester (m. 1975; div. 1979)
- Children: 2, including Jennifer Jason Leigh
- Military career
- Branch: United States Navy
- Service years: 1946–1948
- Rank: Seaman First Class

Victor Harry Morrow (born Victor Morozoff; February 14, 1929 – July 23, 1982) was an American actor. Active on screen for over three decades, he made his debut in the drama film Blackboard Jungle (1955). Morrow came to prominence as one of the leads of the ABC drama series Combat! (1962–1967), which earned him an Emmy nomination for Outstanding Continued Performance by an Actor in a Series. He also appeared in the films King Creole (1958), God's Little Acre (1958), Dirty Mary, Crazy Larry (1974), and The Bad News Bears (1976). Morrow continued acting up to his death during filming of Twilight Zone: The Movie (1983) when he and two child actors were killed by a crashing helicopter.

== Early life ==
Morrow was born in the Bronx, New York City, the son of Harry Morrow (né Morozoff), an electrical engineer, and Eugenia "Jean" (née Barmachenko). Harry and Eugenia were Russian Jewish immigrants. Morrow dropped out of high school when he was 17 and enlisted in the United States Navy. Morrow and his family lived in Asbury Park, New Jersey for many years.

== Career ==
After his military service, Morrow earned his diploma through attending night school and enrolled at Florida Southern College on the G.I. Bill, intending to study pre-law. While there, he became interested in acting after appearing in a student production of I Remember Mama. He dropped pre-law to study at Mexico City College, where he acted in bilingual performances of plays by writers including Shakespeare and Molière. He then relocated to New York City, where he worked in theater before joining Paul Mann's acting workshop for two years. Per his instructor's request, he did not act professionally during this time, instead driving a taxi to make money.

Morrow attracted attention playing Stanley Kowalski in a touring production of A Streetcar Named Desire.

=== Blackboard Jungle and typecasting ===
His first movie role was in Blackboard Jungle (1955), playing a thug student who torments teacher Glenn Ford. He signed a contract with MGM in 1955 due to the success of the film, and his breakout performance as Artie West. However, according to Morrow, many of the roles offered to him by MGM after Blackboard Jungle were "switch blade parts." Morrow parted with MGM in 1956 due to this reason, adding that to "be typed isn't good for an actor like me." Morrow said that independent studios offered him similar tough guy and juvenile delinquent roles; "I turned them down until I ran out of money."

People who saw me in Blackboard Jungle thought I was just a juvenile delinquent out of the streets. A lot of people apparently think I'm nutty... I went into a store on Hollywood Blvd. and the woman, for a moment, thought I was going to rob her—until she recalled where she had seen me. People seem to think I look menacing... They think I'm what they see on the screen, but basically I'm a quiet guy.

— Morrow on his role in Blackboard Jungle

MGM afterward put Morrow in Tribute to a Bad Man (1956). Morrow appeared on television, guest starring on shows like The Millionaire, Matinee Theatre, Climax!, Alfred Hitchcock Presents, The Restless Gun, Trackdown, Richard Diamond, Private Detective and Telephone Time.

Morrow had supporting roles in Men in War (1957), directed by Anthony Mann, and was third billed in Hell's Five Hours (1958). He starred alongside Elvis Presley and an all-star supporting cast including Walter Matthau and Carolyn Jones in the movie King Creole (1958), directed by Michael Curtiz. Mann asked him back for God's Little Acre (1958).

A Man Called Sledge is a 1970 Italian spaghetti Western film starring James Garner in an extremely offbeat role as a grimly hardened thief, and featuring Dennis Weaver, Claude Akins and Wayde Preston. The film was written by Vic Morrow and Frank Kowalski, and directed by Morrow in Techniscope.

However, Morrow remained mostly a television actor, appearing in Naked City, Wichita Town, The Rifleman, The Lineup, Johnny Ringo, The Brothers Brannagan, The Law and Mr. Jones, The Lawless Years, The Barbara Stanwyck Show, General Electric Theatre, Target: The Corruptors, The Tall Man, Outlaws, Bonanza, and The Untouchables.

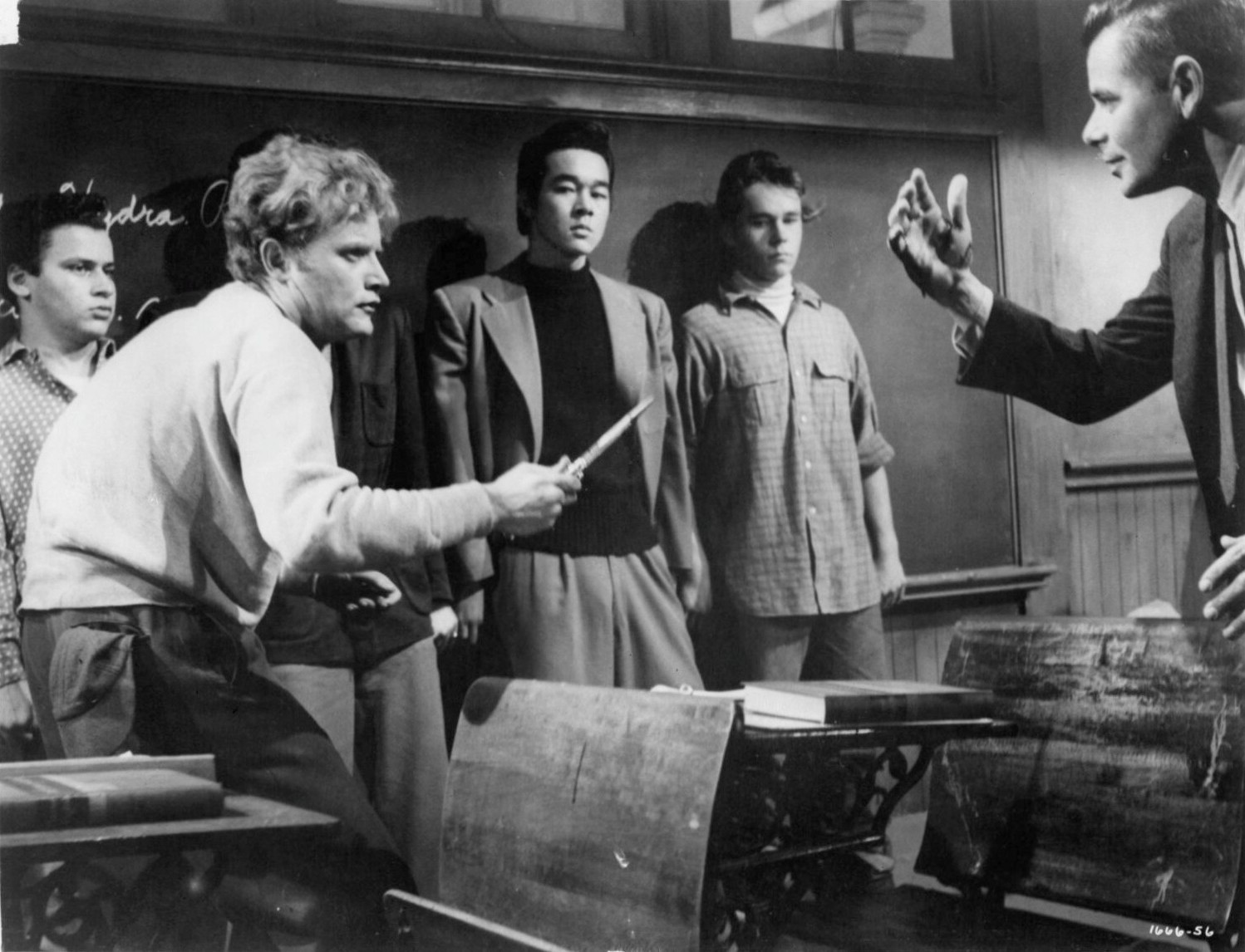
Morrow and Glenn Ford in Blackboard Jungle (1955)

He was cast in the early Bonanza episode "The Avenger" as a mysterious figure known only as "Lassiter" – named after his town of origin – who arrives in Virginia City. He helps save Ben and Adam Cartwright from an unjust hanging, while eventually gunning down one sought-after man, revealing himself as the hunter of a lynch mob who killed his father. Having so far killed about half the mob, he rides off into the night, in an episode that resembles the later Clint Eastwood film High Plains Drifter. Morrow later appeared in the third season Bonanza episode "The Tin Badge".

Mann used Morrow a third time in Cimarron (1960), again tormenting Glenn Ford. He took on Audie Murphy in Posse from Hell (1961).

Morrow was cast as soldier-engineer Lt. Robert Benson in the 1962 episode "A Matter of Honor" on the syndicated anthology series Death Valley Days, hosted by Stanley Andrews. The story focuses on Benson's fiancée, Indiana (Shirley Ballard), who tries to persuade him to boost their income by selling inside Army information to criminal real estate moguls like Joseph Hooker (Howard Petrie). Trevor Bardette and Meg Wyllie were cast in the roles of Captain and Mrs. Warner.

Morrow had his first leading role in Portrait of a Mobster (1961) playing Dutch Schultz.

He continued as mostly a television actor, appearing in Death Valley Days, Alcoa Premiere, and Suspense.

=== Combat! ===
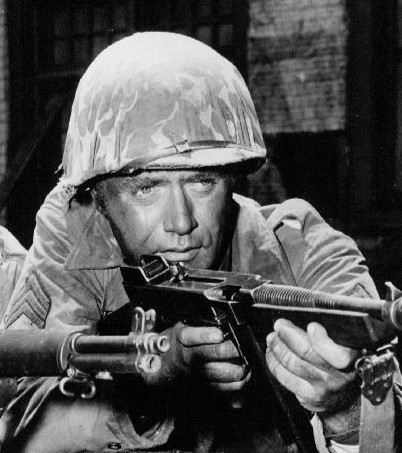
As Sgt. Saunders in Combat!

Morrow was cast in the lead role of Sergeant "Chip" Saunders in ABC's Combat!, a World War II drama, which aired from 1962 to 1967. Pop culture scholar Gene Santoro has written:

TV's longest-running World War II drama (1962–1967) was really a collection of complex 50-minute movies. Salted with battle sequences, they follow a squad's travails from D-Day on – a gritty ground-eye view of men trying to salvage their humanity and survive. Melodrama, comedy, and satire come into play as top-billed Lieutenant Hanley (Rick Jason) and Sergeant Saunders (Vic Morrow) lead their men toward Paris .... The relentlessness hollows antihero Saunders out: at times, you can see the tombstones in his eyes."

His friend and fellow actor on Combat!, Rick Jason, described Morrow as "a master director", praising his directorial work on the two-part episode of Combat! entitled "Hills Are for Heroes", which was written by Gene L. Coon and was one of seven episodes that Morrow directed, as "one of the greatest anti-war films I've ever seen".

=== Deathwatch and A Man Called Sledge ===
Morrow also worked as a film and television director. Together with Leonard Nimoy, he produced the 1965 film Deathwatch, an English-language film version of Jean Genet's play Deathwatch (title in French: Haute Surveillance), adapted by Morrow and Barbara Turner, directed by Morrow, and starring Nimoy.

After Combat! ended, Morrow played the lead in Target: Harry (1969), the pilot for a proposed series that was not picked up; Roger Corman directed.

In 1969, he set up his own company, Carleigh, which was named after his daughters Carrie Ann and Jennifer Leigh.

Morrow wrote and directed a spaghetti Western, produced by Dino DeLaurentiis, titled A Man Called Sledge (1970) and starring James Garner, Dennis Weaver and Claude Akins. After Deathwatch, it was Morrow's first and only big screen outing behind the camera. Sledge was filmed in Almería (Spain) with desert-like settings that were highly evocative of the Southwestern United States.

Morrow guest starred in The Immortal, Dan August, Hawaii Five-O, Mannix, Sarge, McCloud, and Owen Marshall, Counselor at Law.

=== TV movies ===
In the 1970s, Morrow starred in some television movies including A Step Out of Line (1971), Travis Logan, D.A. (1971) (playing the title role), River of Mystery (1971), The Glass House (1972), The Weekend Nun, Tom Sawyer (1973), and Nightmare (1974).

Morrow guest starred in Ironside, The Bold Ones: The New Doctors, Mission: Impossible, The FBI, Love Story, The Streets of San Francisco, and Police Story.

Morrow appeared in two episodes of Australian-produced anthology series The Evil Touch (1973), one of which he also directed.

Morrow played the wily local sheriff in director John Hough's road classic Dirty Mary Crazy Larry, as well as the homicidal sheriff, alongside Martin Sheen, in the television film The California Kid (1974), and The Take (1974).

Morrow had the lead in Funeral for an Assassin (1975). He had key roles in Death Stalk (1975), Wanted: Babysitter (also called Scar Tissue; 1975), The Night That Panicked America (1975), Treasure of Matecumbe (1976) and had a key role as aggressive, competitive baseball coach Roy Turner, in the comedy The Bad News Bears (1976). Morrow said he took the role in The Bad News Bears "because of the ending when my character asks Walter Matthau why the kids don't like him. The scene really worked for me and felt good. Then it was taken out of the final film."

In the late 1970s, Morrow worked increasingly in miniseries such as Captains and the Kings (1977), Roots and The Last Convertible (1979), as well as guest starring on shows like Bronc, Hunter, The Littlest Hobo, and Charlie's Angels.

He returned to directing, helming episodes of Quincy, M.E. and Lucan. He also directed the 1980 television movie "The Secret of Lost Valley" for Disney's Wonderful World.

=== Final roles ===
Morrow had the lead in The Ghost of Cypress Swamp (1977), which aired as part of The Wonderful World of Disney and was based on the 1975 book "Weakfoot" by Linda Cline. He also starred in the Japanese film Message from Space (1978) and The Evictors (1979). He was in TV movies The Man with the Power (1977), The Hostage Heart (1977), Curse of the Black Widow (1977), Wild and Wooly (1978), Stone (1979), and Paris (1980)

Morrow made Humanoids from the Deep (1980) for Roger Corman and The Last Shark (1981); and had a regular role in the series, B.A.D. Cats (1980).

Morrow's last roles included guest roles in Charlie's Angels, Magnum, P.I., and the films 1990: The Bronx Warriors (1981) and Abenko Green Berets (1982).

== Personal life ==
From 1957 to 1964, Morrow was married to actress and screenwriter Barbara Turner. They had two daughters, Carrie Ann Morrow (d. 2016) and actress Jennifer Jason Leigh. He married Gale Lester in 1975; they separated just prior to Morrow's death in July 1982.

Morrow fell out with his daughter Jennifer after his divorce from her mother. She changed her last name to Leigh and they were still estranged at the time of his death (Morrow died three weeks before the theatrical release of Fast Times at Ridgemont High, which starred Leigh as Stacy Hamilton). Leigh stated in a 2018 interview: "my father was very difficult ... We were not close. It's hard. I don't really talk about my father publicly, because there are a lot of people that really love him very, very much – his work as an actor. I don't want to disabuse them [of] their admiration." Leigh named a desire to understand her father as well as her sister Carrie, whom she described as a "drug addict", as inspirations for her to pursue acting.

Morrow had a much closer relationship to his other daughter Carrie; according to her widow Kathy Lopez, Carrie had encouraged Morrow to continue to pursue different acting opportunities and take the role in The Twilight Zone during the filming of which he was killed. Lopez stated that Carrie "felt responsible for encouraging him. Survivor's guilt. They were best friends. They were really, really close."

While living in New York, Morrow befriended fellow actor Louis Gossett Jr., who later worked with him in Roots. Gossett Jr., who played Fiddler in the series, would later describe Morrow as his "good friend" and "one of the greatest actors ever". He recounted that before filming a scene in Roots in which Morrow's character whips Kunta Kinte (portrayed by Levar Burton), Morrow apologized to both Gossett Jr. and Burton for the scene's nature. Though the whip was in reality made of felt, Gossett Jr. was so moved by the scene, which he described as the most emotional scene of his career, that he improvised Fiddler's famous next line, "there's gonna be another day", as he comforted Kunta.

Rick Jason, co-star of Combat!, wrote in his memoirs that Morrow "had an absolute dislike of firearms. He used a Thompson submachine gun in our series, but that was work. In any other respect he'd have nothing to do with them."

== Death ==
In 1982, Morrow was cast in a feature role in Twilight Zone: The Movie in a segment directed by John Landis. Morrow was playing the role of Bill Connor, a racist who is taken back in time and placed in various situations where he would be a persecuted victim: as a Jewish man in Vichy France, a Black man about to be lynched by the Ku Klux Klan, and a Vietnamese man about to be killed by U.S. soldiers.

In the early hours of July 23, 1982, Morrow and two child actors, seven-year-old Myca Dinh Le and six-year-old Renee Shin-Yi Chen, were filming on set in California in an area that was known as Indian Dunes near Santa Clarita. They were performing a scene for the Viet Nam sequence, in which their characters attempt to escape out of a deserted Vietnamese village from a pursuing U.S. Army helicopter. The helicopter was hovering about 24 feet (7.3 m) above them when a fireball from special effect pyrotechnic explosions reportedly caused damage to the helicopter rotor and led to the tail rotors separating from the aircraft, causing the helicopter to plummet and crash on top of them, killing all three instantly. Both Morrow and Le were decapitated' and otherwise mutilated by the rotor blades, while Chen was crushed by the helicopter skid.

Morrow's daughters sued several parties for negligence and wrongful death and were each awarded an out-of-court settlement of $850,000 by Warner Bros. Studios. Landis and four other defendants, including the helicopter pilot Dorcey Wingo, were charged with involuntary manslaughter but were ultimately acquitted after a ten-month trial. The parents of Le and Chen also sued and settled out of court for $2 million each.

Morrow's remains are interred in Hillside Memorial Park Cemetery in Culver City, California. The epitaph for his grave, written by Carrie Ann Morrow, reads "I loved him as 'Dad'; to everyone else he was 'Vic'".

== Filmography ==
Year	Title	Role	Notes
1955	Blackboard Jungle	Artie West	
1955	It's a Dog's Life	Wildfire the dog	Voice, Uncredited
1956	Tribute to a Bad Man	Lars Peterson	
1956	The Millionaire	Joey Diamond	Episode: "The Joey Diamond Story"
1956	Climax!	Ted	Episode: "Strange Hostage"
1957	Men in War	Corporal James Zwickley	
1957	Alfred Hitchcock Presents	Benny Mungo	Season 2 Episode 38: "A Little Sleep"
1958	Richard Diamond, Private Detective	Joe Rovi	Episode: "The Ed Church Case"
1958	Hell's Five Hours	Burt Nash	
1958	King Creole	Shark	
1958	God's Little Acre	Shaw Walden	
1958–1959	The Rifleman	Johnny Cotton	ABC-TV, 2 episodes
1959	Naked City	David Greco	ABC-TV, Episode: "The Shield"
1959	Johnny Ringo	Bill Stoner	CBS-TV, Episode: "Kid With a Gun"
1959	The Lawless Years	Nick Joseph	NBC-TV, Episode: "The Nick Joseph Story (pilot)"
1960	The Brothers Brannagan	Locke	Syndicated TV, series premiere, Episode: "Tune in for Murder"
1960	The Barbara Stanwyck Show	Leroy Benson	NBC-TV, Episode: "The Key to the Killer"
1960	Cimarron	Wes Jennings	
1960–1961	Bonanza	Lassiter / Ab Brock	2 episodes
1960–1962	The Untouchables	Vince Shirer / Collier	2 episodes
1961	Posse from Hell	Crip	
1961	The Law and Mr. Jones	Dr. Bigelow	ABC-TV, Episode: "A Very Special Citizen"
1961	Portrait of a Mobster	Dutch Schultz	
1961	The Tall Man	Skip Farrell	NBC-TV, Episode: "Time of Foreshadowing"
1962	The New Breed	Belman	ABC-TV, Episode: "To Sell Another Human Being"
1962–1967	Combat!	Sergeant Chip Saunders	ABC-TV, 152 episodes
1969	Target: Harry	Harry Black	Alternative titles: What's In it For Harry?, How to Make It
1970	A Man Called Sledge	Gold Guard Scout	Uncredited
1970	The Immortal	Sheriff Dan W. Wheeler	Episode: "The Rainbow Butcher"
1970	Dan August	Steve Harrison	ABC-TV, Episode: "The Union Forever"
1971	Hawaii Five-O	Edward Heron	CBS-TV, Episode: "Two Doves and Mr. Heron"
1971	Mannix	Eric Latimer	CBS-TV, Episode: "Days Beyond Recall"
1971	The F.B.I.	Porter Bent	Episode: "The Stalking Horse"
1971	Sarge	Lieutenant Ross Edmonds	TV, Episode: "A Push Over the Edge"
1972	McCloud	Richard	NBC-TV, Episode: "A Little Plot at Tranquil Valley"
1972	Owen Marshall: Counselor at Law	Andy Capaso	ABC-TV, Episode: "Eight Cents Worth of Protection"
1972	The Glass House	Hugo Slocum	TV movie
1972	Mission: Impossible	Joseph Collins	CBS-TV, Episode: "Two Thousand"
1973	Love Story	Dave Walters	NBC-TV, Episode: "The Cardboard House"
1973	The F.B.I.	John Omar Stahl	Episode: "Desperate Journey"
1973	The Streets of San Francisco	Vic Tolliman	ABC-TV, Episode: "The Twenty-Four Karat Plague"
1973–1974	Police Story	Sergeant Joe LaFrieda	NBC-TV, 3 episodes
1973–1974	The Evil Touch	Purvis Greene	TV, 2 episodes
1974	Dirty Mary, Crazy Larry	Captain Franklin	
1974	The Take	Manso	
1974	The California Kid	Roy Childress	TV movie
1974	Funeral for an Assassin	Michael Cardiff	
1975	Wanted: Babysitter	Vic, the kidnapper	
1975	The Night That Panicked America	Hank Muldoon	TV movie
1976	Captains and the Kings	Tom Hennessey	3 episodes
1976	The Bad News Bears	Coach Roy Turner	
1976	Bronk	Frank Carey	Episode: "Vigilante" (pilot for spinoff detective show starring Morrow)
1976	Treasure of Matecumbe	Spangler	Disney movie
1977	Roots	Ames	ABC-TV miniseries, 2 episodes
1977	Hunter		CBS-TV, 2 episodes
1977	The Hostage Heart	Steve Rockewicz	TV movie
1977	The Ghost of Cypress Swamp	Tom Stone	TV movie
1978	Wild and Wooly	Warden Willis	TV movie
1978	Message from Space (Ucyuu karano messeiji)	General Garuda	Japanese (Toei) movie
1978–1980	Charlie's Angels	Lieutenant Harry Stearns	ABC-TV, "Angel In Hiding" 2 episodes, fifth-season premiere
1979	Greatest Heroes of the Bible	Arioch	TV, Episode: "Daniel and Nebuchadnezzar"
1979	The Evictors	Jake Rudd	
1979	The Seekers	Leland Pell	TV movie
1980	Humanoids from the Deep	Hank Slattery	Alternative titles: Humanoids of the Deep, Monster
1980	B.A.D. Cats	Captain Eugene Nathan	TV, 9 episodes
1981	The Last Shark	Ron Hamer	Alternative titles: Great White
1981	Magnum, P.I.	Police Sergeant Jordan	CBS-TV, Episode: "Wave Goodbye"
1982	Fantasy Island	Douglas Picard	ABC-TV, Episode: "The Challenge/A Genie Named Joe"
1982	1990: The Bronx Warriors	Hammer	Penultimate movie, released posthumously
1982	Abenko gongsu gundan		South Korean war movie. Directed by Im Kwon-taek
1983	Twilight Zone: The Movie	Bill Connor	Killed in an on-set accident during filming, released posthumously (final film role)

== Award nominations ==
Year	Award	Category	Work	Result
1963	Primetime Emmy Awards	Outstanding Continued Performance by an Actor in a Series (Lead)	Combat!	Nominated
