= Robin and the 7 Hoods =

1964 film by Gordon Douglas

- Theatrical release poster
- Directed by: Gordon Douglas
- Written by: David R. Schwartz
- Produced by: Frank Sinatra
- Starring: Frank Sinatra; Dean Martin; Sammy Davis Jr.; Bing Crosby
- Cinematography: William H. Daniels
- Edited by: Sam O'Steen
- Music by: Nelson Riddle
- Production company: P-C Productions
- Distributed by: Warner Bros. Pictures
- Release date: June 24, 1964 (USA)
- Running time: 124 minutes
- Country: United States
- Language: English
- Box office: c. $4,200,000 (US/ Canada)

Robin and the 7 Hoods is a 1964 American musical comedy film directed by Gordon Douglas and starring Frank Sinatra, Dean Martin, Sammy Davis Jr. and Bing Crosby. It features Peter Falk and Barbara Rush, with an uncredited cameo by Edward G. Robinson.

Written by David R. Schwartz, the film reimagines the Robin Hood legend in a 1920s Chicago gangster setting.

Produced by Frank Sinatra, the film introduced the hit song "My Kind of Town" by Jimmy Van Heusen and Sammy Cahn, which was nominated for an Oscar for Best Original Song and achieved a life of its own independent of the film.

== Plot ==
In the 1930s "Big" Jim Stevens, undisputed boss of the Chicago underworld, gets an unexpected birthday present from his ambitious lieutenant, Guy Gisborne. Big Jim gets shot by all the guests at his birthday party, and Gisborne takes over. He orders all the other gangsters in town to pay him protection money, but declares it is still "All for One". The news does not sit well with Big Jim's friend and fellow gangster, Robbo, and a gangland war breaks out.

Robbo recruits pool hustler Little John, who demonstrates his billiards skills while singing "Any Man Who Loves His Mother", plus quickdraw artist Will and a few others, but they are still greatly outnumbered. In addition, the corrupt Sheriff Octavius Glick is on Gisborne's payroll. Gisborne and Robbo come up with the same idea, to destroy the other's gambling joint on the same night, with Will enjoying every moment of shooting up Gisborne's place ("Bang! Bang!").

Big Jim's refined, educated daughter, Marian, shows up. She asks Robbo to avenge her father's death (wrongfully attributed to the sheriff), a request which Robbo flatly refuses. Gisborne disposes of the sheriff. Marian then invites Robbo to dinner and gives him $50,000, falsely assuming that Robbo did as she had asked. Robbo refuses the money, so Marian attempts to seduce him into joining forces to take over the whole town. Robbo turns her down. When she sends the money to his under-repair gambling club, Robbo donates it to a boys' orphanage.

Allen A. Dale, the orphanage's director, notifies the newspapers about this good deed. A new Chicago star is born: a gangster who robs from the rich and gives to the poor. Robbo finds it useful to have the public on his side. He invites the delighted Dale to join his gang, having him handle all the charities. Dale starts the Robbo Foundation and opens a string of soup kitchens, free clinics and orphan shelters. He even gives green, feathered hats and bows and arrows to the orphans, while thoroughly milking the Robin Hood image. In the meantime, Robbo and Little John give tips to Dale on how to improve his own image ("Style").

Robbo's joint reopens and is an instant hit; while Gisborne, whose place is now empty, is infuriated. He and the new sheriff, Potts, organize a police raid. Robbo has anticipated this and when a few switches are pulled, the entire club is disguised as a mission. The sheriff and Gisborne burst in to find Robbo's gang singing gospel songs and preaching the evils of alcohol, complete with hymnals and tambourines ("Mr. Booze").

Robbo is framed for Glick's murder. At the trial, Gisborne and Potts claim that Robbo planned the whole thing. Dale tries to teach the despondent orphans to view this as a lesson ("Don't Be a Do-Badder"). The jury finds Robbo not guilty. Wearing a green suit, Robbo publicly thanks everyone in Chicago ("My Kind of Town").

When he returns to his club, Robbo finds his charities are now a front for counterfeiting. The soup kitchen smuggles fake bills over state lines in soup cans. Robbo also finds Little John living it up in Marian's mansion. Marian is willing to keep Robbo as a front, as long as she is in charge. Robbo shows his contempt for her and leaves, with Little John following him out the door.

Marian finds another willing partner in Gisborne, but the gangster is no match for Robbo and is killed. Robbo tells a shocked Marian to clear out of town.

She instead turns public opinion against him, starting a Women's League for Better Government group and framing Robbo for the counterfeiting ring that she and Little John started, with Potts working as her new partner. Unable to fight a mob of angry women, Robbo and his gang flee. Robbo and his merry men are reduced to working as Santa Clauses to solicit charitable donations. They watch as Marian steps out of a car with her latest partner, Alan A. Dale, who casually gives the Santas money before going off with Marian. The trio shrug and walk down the street together ringing their bells.

== Cast ==
- Frank Sinatra as Robbo
- Dean Martin as Little John
- Sammy Davis Jr. as Will
- Bing Crosby as Alan A. Dale (credited as Allen A. Dale)
- Peter Falk as Guy Gisborne
- Barbara Rush as Marian Stevens
- Victor Buono as Deputy Sheriff Alvin Potts
- Hank Henry as "Six Seconds"
- Robert Foulk as Sheriff Octavius Glick
- Allen Jenkins as Vermin
- Jack La Rue as Tomatoes
- Robert Carricart as Blue Jaw, Gisborne's assistant
- Joseph Ruskin as Twitch
- Phil Arnold as Hatrack
- Harry Swoger as Soupmeat
- Bernard Fein as Charlie Bananas
- Richard Bakalyan as Hood
- Sonny King as Hood
- Phil Crosby as Hood
- Al Silvani as Hood
- Harry Wilson as Hood
- Caryl Lee Hill as Cocktail Waitress
- Mickey Finn as Bartender
- Richard Simmons as Prosecutor

Uncredited:

- Edward G. Robinson as Big Jim
- Chet Allen as Hood
- Hans Conried as Mr. Ricks
- Billy Curtis as Newsboy
- Barry Kelley as Police Chief
- Maurice Manson as Dignitary
- Tony Randall as Hood
- Sig Ruman as Hammacher
- Bill Zuckert as Jury Foreman
- Toni Basil as a dancer

Cast notes

- Peter Lawford was originally cast as Allen A. Dale, but was replaced with Bing Crosby following a falling out with Sinatra. The feud stemmed from a scheduled visit to Sinatra's home by Lawford's brother-in-law, President John F. Kennedy during a 1962 West Coast trip. Attorney General Robert F. Kennedy, who was long concerned about Sinatra's rumored ties with underworld figures, encouraged the President to change his plans and stay at Crosby's home, which (it was maintained) could provide better security for the President. The change came at the last minute, after Sinatra made extensive arrangements for the promised and eagerly awaited presidential visit, including the construction of a helipad. Sinatra was furious, believing that Lawford had failed to intercede with the Kennedys on his behalf and ostracized him from the Rat Pack. Sinatra and Lawford never spoke again. Sinatra endorsed incumbent Democrat Pat Brown for his unsuccessful reelection as governor of California in 1966, then backed Vice-president Hubert Humphrey in his equally unsuccessful run for the presidency in 1968. These were the last two Democrats that Sinatra supported. Crosby, a staunch Republican, ended up cast in Lawford's role.

== Reception ==
On Rotten Tomatoes, the film has an aggregate score of 40% based on 4 positive and 6 negative critic reviews. Variety commented: "Warner Bros. has a solid money entry in 'Robin and the Seven Hoods,' a spoof on gangster pix of bygone days sparked by the names of Frank Sinatra, Dean Martin and Bing Crosby to give marquee power...Performance-wise, Falk comes out best. His comic gangster is a pure gem and he should get plenty of offers after this. Sinatra, of course, is smooth and Crosby in a 'different' type of role rates a big hand. Martin seems lost in the shuffle. Davis is slick and Miss Rush, going heavy, is beautiful to look at."

Bosley Crowther of The New York Times wrote: "The minor musical whimsey that arrived at the Palace and other theaters yesterday under the just-too-cunning title of 'Robin and the 7 Hoods' is almost as strained and archaic in the fable it has to tell of Prohibition-era gangsters in Chicago as the fable of Robin Hood it travesties. Dishing up Frank Sinatra as the leader of a mob that enhances its public image by giving large sums of money to charity, it runs through some all-too-familiar plot arrangements and farce routines that have a fleeting and far-away resemblance to some of the stuff in the old Damon Runyon tales."

Michael Thornton, writing in The Sunday Express had this to say as part of his review. "I must confess I was yawning up to the moment Bing Crosby made his quiet and studious entrance as the unworldly secretary of a children's orphanage. The years have not dealt lightly with Mr. Crosby. The tips of the famous toupee have receded still further back upon that time-honoured face. But after some moments of horrifying suspicion that he had been introduced as a mute stooge for the Sinatra Clan, the Old Master opened his mouth to sing again and to prove that his sweetness of tone remains unimpaired and undiminished for all his years of seniority."

The song "My Kind of Town" was nominated for the American Film Institute's 2004 list AFI's 100 Years...100 Songs.

== Music ==
Sammy Cahn and Jimmy Van Heusen wrote the score. Crosby, still a major movie star at the time who had top billing over Sinatra in their last film together, High Society, sang more songs than Sinatra in this film as well.

"My Kind of Town" is the centerpiece number of the film. Orchestral versions of the song are the primary element of the opening and closing credits. A dance band also plays the song in Robbo's speakeasy. Sinatra sings the song to the citizens outside the courthouse after his framing for and acquittal of murdering the sheriff.

=== Songs ===
- "Robin And The 7 Hoods (Overture)" - Orchestra Conducted by Nelson Riddle
- "My Kind of Town" - Frank Sinatra
- "All for One and One for All" - Peter Falk and Chorus
- "Don’t Be a Do-Badder" - Bing Crosby and the Mitchell Boy Singers
- "Style" - Bing Crosby, Frank Sinatra and Dean Martin
- "Mister Booze" - Bing Crosby, Frank Sinatra, Dean Martin, Sammy Davis Jr. and Chorus
- "I Like to Lead When I Dance" - Frank Sinatra
- "Bang! Bang!" - Sammy Davis Jr.
- "Charlotte Couldn’t Charleston" - The Ladies of the Ensemble.
- "Give Praise! Give Praise! Give Praise!" - Chorus.
- "Don’t Be a Do-Badder" (Finale) - Bing Crosby, Frank Sinatra, Dean Martin, Sammy Davis Jr.

== Production ==
Robin and the 7 Hoods was filmed from October to December 1963. It was a troubled production interrupted by both the assassination of John F. Kennedy, a personal former friend of Sinatra's, and just weeks later, the kidnapping of Frank Sinatra Jr. Despite these difficulties, cast and crew ultimately decided to complete the film.

== Novelization ==
A novelization by Jack Pearl was published by Pocket Books in 1964. The character of Marian features much more heavily in the book, including a scene in which she testifies against Robbo in court then has most of her clothes torn off by an angry mob outside the court room, and another in which she gives a lengthy speech about the nature of Robbo's appeal to the masses.

== Stage musical ==
A new version of Robin and the 7 Hoods, with a book by Rupert Holmes, premiered on stage July 30, 2010 at the Old Globe Theater in San Diego, California. Updated to the early 1960s, it includes only one of the film's songs, "My Kind of Town", but features 18 others composed by Cahn and Van Heusen, among them Come Fly with Me and Ain't That a Kick in the Head?. The piece ran throughout August 2010. Casey Nicholaw directed and choreographed the musical, set in the Mad Men era of 1962. The story is about a likable gangster hoping to get out of the crime business. A do-gooding TV reporter likens him to a modern-day Robin Hood.

== Home media ==
Robin and the 7 Hoods has been released on a number of home video editions, individually and as part of the deluxe multi-movie set The Rat Pack Ultimate Collector's Edition. Cases for DVD editions depicted a portrait of Sinatra, Martin, Davis Jr and Crosby with guns in their hands. Because Crosby's character is not involved in the group's criminal operations, the portrait was altered to show him gunless.

The film's soundtrack album was rereleased on compact disc in 2000 on Artanis Records.

== Trivia ==
In an early scene in the movie, Robbo threatens Gisborne by saying "If you come over there like George Washington, I send you back like Abraham Lincoln", referring to him as "Mr. President". This scene was filmed before the assassination of John F. Kennedy. Sinatra later regretted the inclusion of this line in the script, according to his commentary on the DVD release.
