= Duets/Duets II: 90th Birthday Limited Collector's Edition =

Compilation album by Frank Sinatra
- Released: November 28, 2005
- Recorded: 1993–1994
- Genre: Jazz
- Length: 105:07
- Label: Capitol
- Producer: David Foster; Phil Ramone; Albert Hammond; Andre Fischer; Tommy LiPuma; Al Schmitt; Patrick Williams

Frank Sinatra chronology
Live from Las Vegas (2005)	Duets/Duets II: 90th Birthday Limited Collector's Edition (2005)	Sinatra: Vegas (2006)

Duets/Duets II: 90th Birthday Limited Celebration Edition is a two-disc compilation album set by Frank Sinatra. This was released to celebrate his 90th birthday. The album includes a duet with Willie Nelson on "My Way" (disc 2, track 15).

== Track listing ==
=== Disc one ===
1. "The Lady Is a Tramp" (Richard Rodgers, Lorenz Hart)--arranged by Billy Byers (with Luther Vandross) - 3:24
2. "What Now My Love" (Gilbert Becaud, Carl Sigman, Pierre Leroyer)--arranged by Don Costa; introduction arranged by Patrick Williams (with Aretha Franklin) - 3:15
3. "I've Got a Crush on You" (George Gershwin, Ira Gershwin)--arranged by Williams (original arrangement by Nelson Riddle) (with Barbra Streisand) - 3:23
4. "Summer Wind" (Heinz Meier, Hans Bradtke, Johnny Mercer)--arranged by Riddle (with Julio Iglesias) - 2:32
5. "Come Rain or Come Shine" (Harold Arlen, Mercer)--arranged by Costa (with Gloria Estefan) - 4:04
6. "New York, New York" (Fred Ebb, John Kander)--arranged by Costa (with Tony Bennett) - 3:30
7. "They Can't Take That Away from Me" (G. Gershwin, I. Gershwin)--arranged by Williams; original arrangement by Neal Hefti (with Natalie Cole) - 3:11
8. "You Make Me Feel So Young" (Mack Gordon, Josef Myrow)--arranged by Quincy Jones (with Charles Aznavour) - 3:05
9. "Guess I'll Hang My Tears Out to Dry"/"In the Wee Small Hours of the Morning" (Sammy Cahn, Jule Styne)/(Bob Hilliard, David Mann)--arranged by Riddle (with Carly Simon) - 3:57
10. "I've Got the World on a String" (Arlen, Ted Koehler)--arranged by Riddle (with Liza Minnelli) - 2:18
11. "Witchcraft" (Cy Coleman, Carolyn Leigh)--arranged by Riddle; introduction arranged by Williams (with Anita Baker) - 3:22
12. "I've Got You Under My Skin" (Cole Porter)--arranged by Riddle (with Bono) - 3:32
13. "All the Way"/"One for My Baby (and One More for the Road)" (Cahn, Jimmy Van Heusen)/(Arlen, Mercer)--arranged by Williams; original arrangement of "All The Way" by Riddle; "One For My Baby" arranged by Riddle (with Kenny G) - 6:03

=== Disc two ===
1. "For Once in My Life" (Ron Miller, Orlando Murden)--arranged by Don Costa (with Gladys Knight and Stevie Wonder) - 3:18
2. "Come Fly with Me" (Cahn, Van Heusen)--arranged by Billy May (with Luis Miguel) - 4:17
3. "Bewitched, Bothered and Bewildered" (Rodgers, Hart)--arranged by Patrick Williams; original arrangement by Nelson Riddle (with Patti LaBelle) - 3:31
4. "The Best is Yet to Come" (Coleman, Leigh)--arranged by Quincy Jones (with Jon Secada) - 3:12
5. "Moonlight in Vermont" (John Blackburn, Karl Suessdorf)--arranged by Williams; original arrangement by May (with Linda Ronstadt) - 4:07
6. "Fly Me to the Moon (In Other Words)" (Bart Howard)--arranged by Jones and Williams (with Antônio Carlos Jobim) - 3:06
7. "Luck Be a Lady" (Frank Loesser)--arranged by May (with Chrissie Hynde) - 5:17
8. "A Foggy Day" (G. Gershwin, I. Gershwin)--arranged by Johnny Mandel (with Willie Nelson) - 2:24
9. "Where or When" (Rodgers, Hart)--arranged by Billy Byers (with Steve Lawrence and Eydie Gormé) - 3:53
10. "Embraceable You" (G. Gershwin, I. Gershwin)--arranged by Riddle (with Lena Horne) - 3:45
11. "Mack the Knife" (Marc Blitzstein, Bertolt Brecht, Kurt Weill)--arranged by Frank Foster and Williams (with Jimmy Buffett) - 4:26
12. "How Do You Keep the Music Playing?"/"My Funny Valentine" (Alan Bergman, Marilyn Bergman, Michel Legrand)/(Rodgers, Hart)--arranged by Williams; original arrangement by Riddle (with Lorrie Morgan) - 3:58
13. "My Kind of Town" (Cahn, Van Heusen)--arranged by Riddle (with Frank Sinatra Jr.) - 2:33
14. "The House I Live In" (Lewis Allan, Earl Robinson)--arranged by Costa (with Neil Diamond) - 4:14
15. "My Way" [Previously Unreleased] (Paul Anka, Claude François, Jacques Revaux, Gilles Thibaut)--arranged by Costa (with Willie Nelson) - 4:22
