= Live from Las Vegas (Frank Sinatra album) =

Live album by Frank Sinatra
- Released: April 26, 2005
- Recorded: December 1986
- Genres: Traditional pop, vocal jazz
- Length: 72:57
- Label: Capitol

Frank Sinatra chronology
Fly Me to the Moon (Opus Collection) (2005)	Live from Las Vegas (2005)	Duets/Duets II: 90th Birthday Limited Collector's Edition (2005)

Professional ratings
Review scores
Source	Rating
AllMusic	4.5/5 stars

Live from Las Vegas is a 2005 live album by the American singer Frank Sinatra.

This album forms part of Capitol Records 'Las Vegas Centennial Collection', and showcases a December 1986 concert by Sinatra. This was Sinatra's first live Las Vegas album released since 1966s Sinatra at the Sands. It was recorded at the Golden Nugget Las Vegas. The album appeared on the Billboard top albums chart for one week in May 2005, at position 199.

== Track listing ==
1. Intro ("A Lovely Way to Spend an Evening") [instrumental] (Harold Adamson, Jimmy McHugh) – 0:38
2. "I've Got the World On a String" (Harold Arlen, Ted Koehler) – 2:25
3. "What Now My Love" (Gilbert Bécaud, Pierre Delanoë, Carl Sigman) – 2:43
4. "I Get a Kick Out of You" (Cole Porter) – 4:58
5. "My Heart Stood Still" (Richard Rodgers, Lorenz Hart) – 3:27
6. "Luck Be a Lady" (Frank Loesser) – 5:04
7. "I've Got a Crush on You" (George Gershwin, Ira Gershwin) – 2:32
8. "Mack the Knife" (Marc Blitzstein, Bertolt Brecht, Kurt Weill) – 4:30
9. Monologue – 1:59
10. "The Girls I Never Kissed" (Leiber and Stoller) – 4:03
11. "For Once in My Life" (Ron Miller, Orlando Murden) – 2:53
12. "Someone to Watch Over Me" (G. Gershwin, I. Gershwin) – 3:46
13. "Maybe This Time" (Fred Ebb, John Kander) – 2:51
14. "I've Got You Under My Skin" (Porter) – 4:22
15. "Only One to a Customer" (Carolyn Leigh, Jule Styne) – 3:45
16. "I Have Dreamed" (Rodgers, Oscar Hammerstein II) – 3:22
17. "My Way" (Paul Anka, Claude François, Jacques Revaux, Gilles Thibault) – 4:01
18. "New York, New York" (Kander, Ebb) – 3:55
19. Bows ("You Are There") (instrumental) (Harry Sukman, Paul Francis Webster) – 0:44
- Tracks 1, 3, 13–17 and 19 recorded on December 27, 1986
- Tracks 4, 8, 10 and 18 recorded on December 31, 1986

== Personnel ==
- Frank Sinatra – vocals
- Bill Miller – pianist, conductor
- Jim Hughart – bass
- Ron Anthony – guitarist
- Irving Cottler – drummer
- Featuring the Golden Nugget's Orchestra
