= Indian Dunes =

Ranch in Southern California that was filming location in the 1980s

Coordinates: 34°25′26.5″N 118°38′11.3″W

Indian Dunes was a 600-acre (2.4 km^{2}) film ranch owned by Newhall Land & Farming Company. Located near the Six Flags Magic Mountain amusement park in Valencia, California, United States, it was a favorite of filmmakers for its versatility and location within the thirty-mile zone until its owners returned the site to farming in 1990 following a reduced interest in the kind of action television programs and films that had been produced there. The company reportedly grossed up to $600,000 in 1990 ($1.3 million in 2021 dollars).

== Productions ==
The site portrayed the American Southwest, Brazil, Japan, France and Germany, Africa, Afghanistan, Burma, Central America and often Vietnam. It featured hills, flat plains, riverbeds and densely wooded forest land that could portray locations around the world. In exchange for reduced rental rates, previous productions had also left behind standing sets including a village, labor-camp, prison, ranch house, military barracks and 4.5-mile (7.2 km) railroad line including locomotive and train cars that could be re-used, reducing production costs. The location was the site of a helicopter accident which occurred during the making of Twilight Zone: The Movie. Actor Vic Morrow and two child actors, 7-year-old Myca Dinh Le and 6-year-old Renee Shin-Yi Chen, were killed.

The site was popular with television programs in the 1980s such as The A-Team, MacGyver, The Fall Guy and The Incredible Hulk as well as films including The Color Purple and Escape from New York. China Beach was the last television production shot there. Music videos featuring bands such as Van Halen and the Fixx were also filmed at the ranch.

== Other uses ==
Newhall Land & Farming Company built Indian Dunes Airport on the site in the 1960s with a single unpaved runway running northeast to southwest. The airport was used for company aircraft and was sometimes leased to film and television shows including 84 Charlie MoPic and Baa Baa Black Sheep.

The site hosted the Indian Dunes Motor Recreation Park, a multi-track motocross and track racing park during the 1970s and 1980s. This use was discontinued due to liability concerns.
