= Rat Pack =

Group of popular entertainers in the mid 20th century

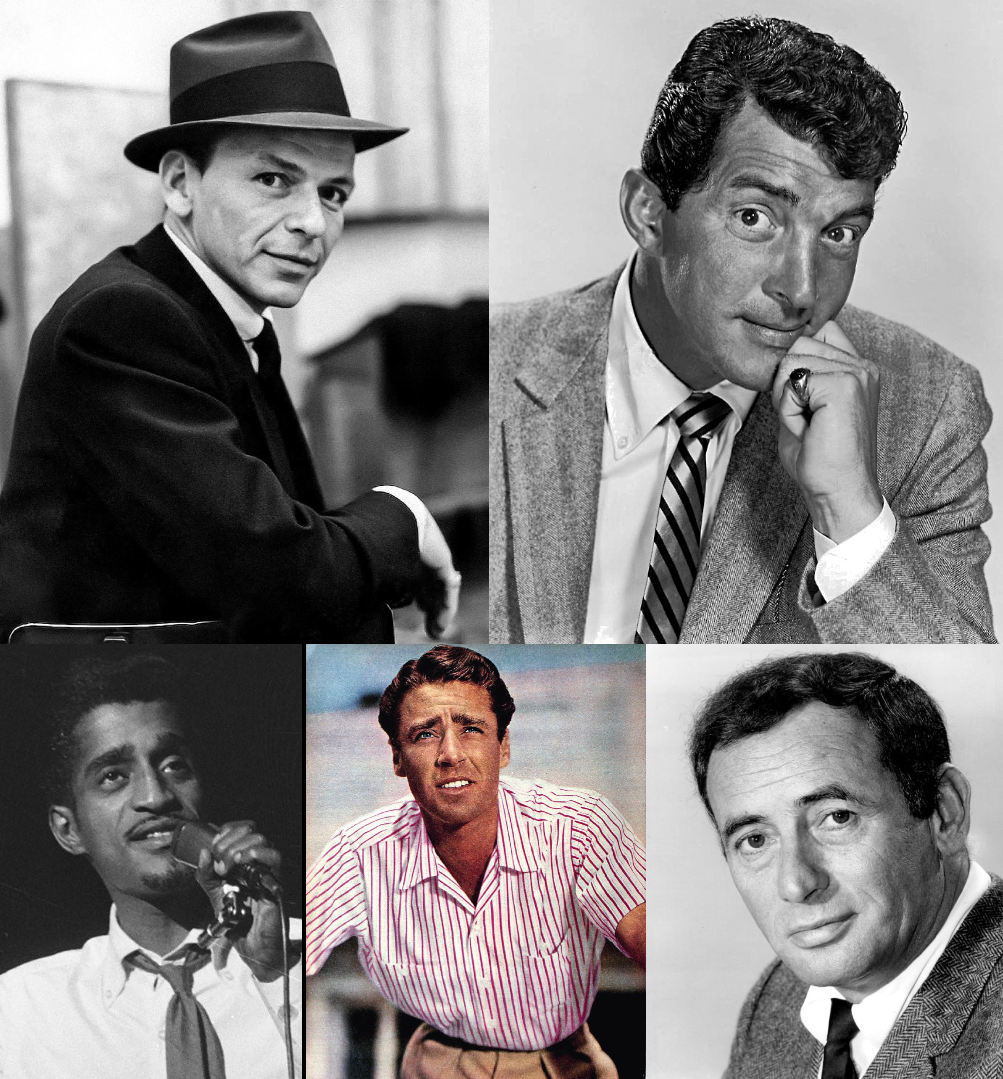
From top to bottom, left to right: Frank Sinatra, Dean Martin, Sammy Davis Jr., Peter Lawford, and Joey Bishop

The Rat Pack was an informal group of singers that, in its second iteration, ultimately made films and appeared together in Las Vegas casino venues. They originated in the late 1940s and early 1950s as a group of A-list show business friends, such as Errol Flynn, Nat King Cole, Mickey Rooney, Judy Garland, Frank Sinatra and others who met casually at the Holmby Hills home of Humphrey Bogart and Lauren Bacall. In the 1960s, the group featured Sinatra, Dean Martin, Sammy Davis Jr., Joey Bishop, and (before falling out with Sinatra in 1962) Peter Lawford, among others. They appeared together on stage and in films in the 1950s and 1960s, including the films Ocean's 11 and Sergeants 3; after Lawford's expulsion, they filmed Robin and the 7 Hoods with Bing Crosby in what was to have been Lawford's role. Sinatra, Martin, and Davis were regarded as the group's lead members after Bogart's death, in 1957.

== 1950s ==
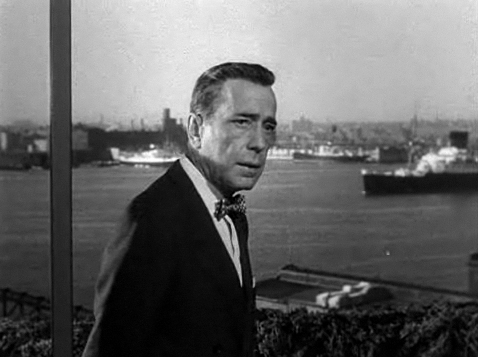
Humphrey Bogart, original Rat Pack leader (from Sabrina, 1954)

The term "Rat Pack" was first used to name a group of friends in New York City, and several explanations have been offered for the name. According to one version, Lauren Bacall saw her husband Humphrey Bogart and his friends returning from a night in Las Vegas and said, "You look like a goddamn rat pack." "Rat Pack" may also be a shortened version of "Holmby Hills Rat Pack", a reference to the home of Bogart and Bacall which served as a regular hangout of the same group of friends during the late 1940s and early 1950s.

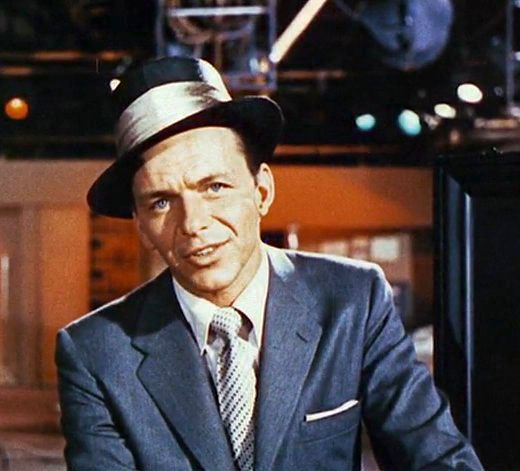
Sinatra portrait in 1957. Frank Sinatra became the Rat Pack leader from 1957 on in the wake of Humphrey Bogart's death.

Visiting members included Errol Flynn, Ava Gardner, Nat King Cole, Robert Mitchum, Elizabeth Taylor, Janet Leigh, Tony Curtis, Mickey Rooney, Lena Horne, Jerry Lewis, and Cesar Romero. According to Stephen Bogart, the original members of the Holmby Hills Rat Pack were Frank Sinatra (pack master), Judy Garland (first vice-president), Sid Luft (cage master), Bogart (rat in charge of public relations), Swifty Lazar (recording secretary and treasurer), Nathaniel Benchley (historian), David Niven, Katharine Hepburn, Spencer Tracy, George Cukor, Cary Grant, Rex Harrison, and Jimmy Van Heusen. The Rat Pack group underwent several transformations. The publicly best-known transformation happened under the leadership of Frank Sinatra.

After Bogart's death in 1957, Frank Sinatra and Lauren Bacall became engaged and planned a marriage while living together in Sinatra's homes. Frank Sinatra became the Rat Pack leader from 1957 on. By the end of the 1950s, the Rat Pack evolved into an informal production group whose members united their star power to support each other's careers. At that time, the Rat Pack activities expanded to Las Vegas where members performed regular gigs and helped each other by making unannounced appearances to impress the audiences. In 1958, three Rat Pack members, Sinatra, Martin, and Shirley MacLaine starred in Some Came Running that was popular with the public.

Also in 1958, a story about a series of Las Vegas casino robberies circulated among entertainers, so Peter Lawford bought the rights and Frank Sinatra became interested in the idea. Several members of the Rat Pack who were regulars in Vegas, were naturally fit to lead the cast of characters in the upcoming production, including Frank Sinatra, Dean Martin, Sammy Davis Jr., Peter Lawford, and Joey Bishop, and also Angie Dickinson, Cesar Romero, and Shirley MacLaine. A variety of writers worked on the project, titled Ocean's 11, and the production was set to begin in January 1960.

== 1960s ==
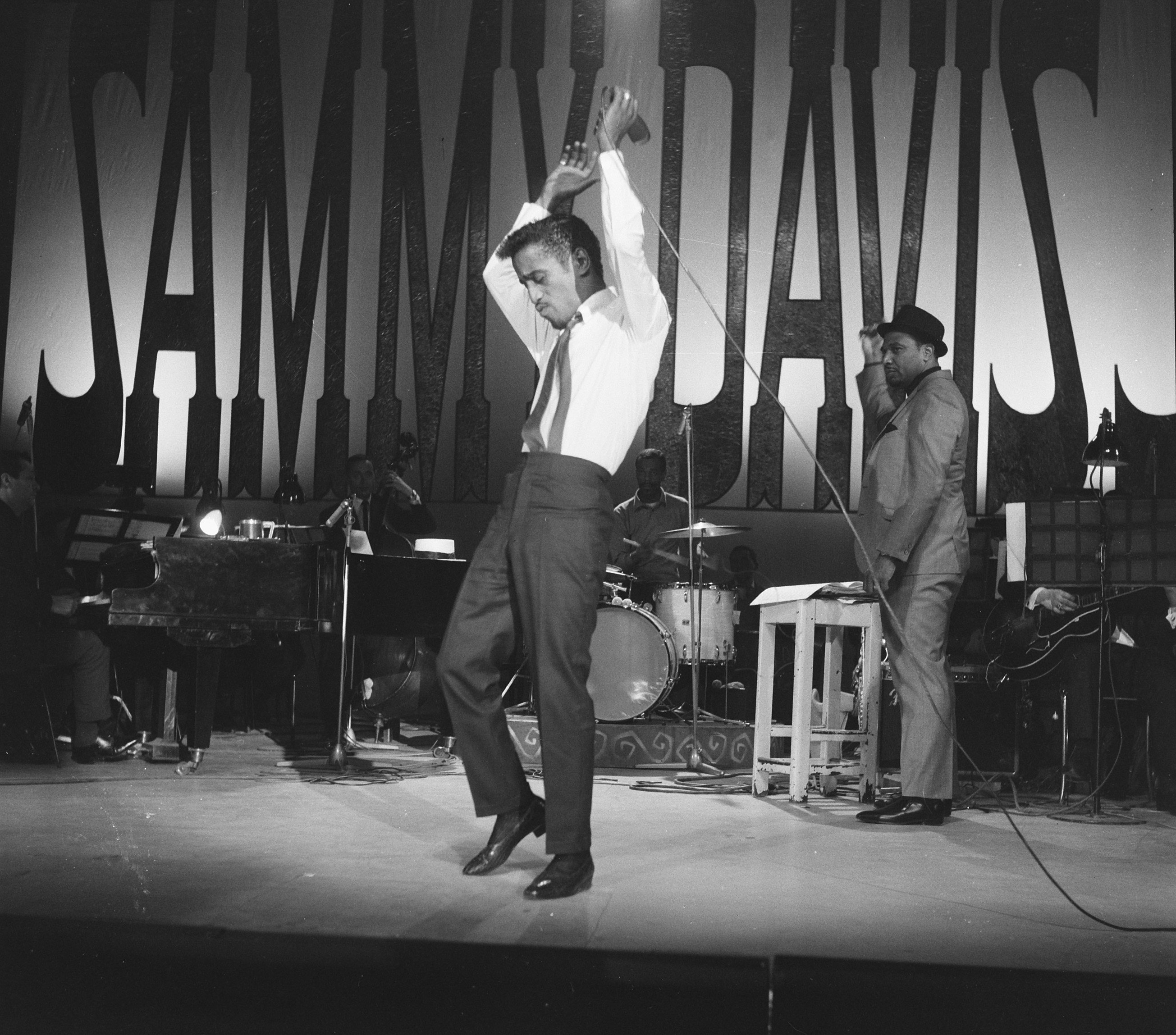
Sammy Davis Jr. (1961)

The film Ocean's 11, made between January and March of 1960, shows several members of the Rat Pack group as they were in the late 1950s and early 1960s. This was the second incarnation of the Rat Pack under the leadership of Frank Sinatra.

The early 1960s version of the group included Frank Sinatra, Dean Martin, Sammy Davis Jr., Peter Lawford, and Joey Bishop. This group was originally known as the "Clan", but that name fell out of favor because it was reminiscent of the Ku Klux Klan.

Marilyn Monroe, Angie Dickinson, Juliet Prowse, Buddy Greco, and Shirley MacLaine were often referred to as the "Rat Pack Mascots".

Comedian Don Rickles wrote that "I never received an official membership card but Frank made me feel part of the fun."

Peter Lawford was a brother-in-law of President John F. Kennedy (dubbed "Brother-in-Lawford" by Sinatra), and Kennedy spent time with Sinatra and the others when he visited Las Vegas, during which members sometimes referred to the group as "the Jack Pack". Rat Pack members played a role in campaigning for Kennedy and the Democrats, appearing at the July 1960 Democratic National Convention in Los Angeles. Lawford asked Sinatra if he would have Kennedy as a guest at his Palm Springs house in March 1962 and Sinatra went to great lengths to accommodate the President, including the construction of a helipad. Attorney General Robert F. Kennedy advised his brother to sever ties with Sinatra because of his association with Mafia figures such as Sam Giancana and he canceled the visit. Kennedy instead stayed at Bing Crosby's estate, which further infuriated Sinatra. Lawford was blamed for this and Sinatra "never again had a good word" for him. Lawford's role was written out of the upcoming 4 for Texas, and his part in Robin and the 7 Hoods was given to Bing Crosby.

In 1964 Sinatra asked Bishop to fill in for him at the Cal-Neva Lodge in Lake Tahoe as a favor, but Bishop demanded $50,000 and to be flown in a private jet. Sinatra, offended, disconnected the call on Bishop and removed him from the Rat Pack.

== Revival ==
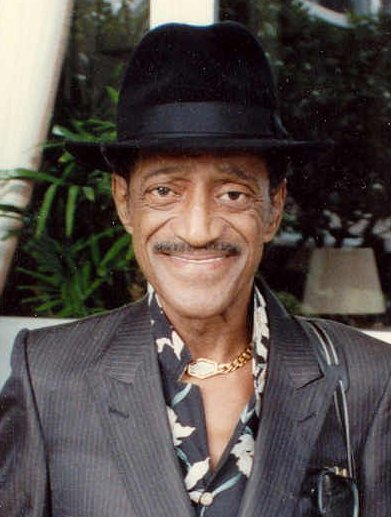
Sammy Davis Jr. in 1989

Sinatra, Davis, and Martin announced a 29-date tour called Together Again in December 1987. At the press conference to announce the tour, Martin joked about calling it off, and Sinatra rebuked a reporter for using the term "Rat Pack", referring to it as "that stupid phrase".

Dean Martin's son Dean Paul Martin died in a plane crash in March 1987 on the San Gorgonio Mountain in California, the same mountain where Sinatra's mother had been killed in a plane crash ten years earlier. Martin had since become increasingly dependent on alcohol and prescription drugs. Davis had hip replacement surgery two years previously, and was estranged from Sinatra because of Davis's use of cocaine. Davis was also experiencing severe financial difficulties, and was promised by Sinatra's people that he could earn between six and eight million dollars from the tour.

Martin had not made a film or recorded since 1984 and Sinatra felt that the tour would be good for Martin, telling Davis, "I think it would be great for Dean. Get him out. For that alone it would be worth doing". Sinatra and Davis still performed regularly, yet they had not recorded for several years. Both Sinatra and Martin had made their last film appearances together in 1984's Cannonball Run II, which also starred Davis. This marked the trio's first feature film appearance since 1964's Robin and the 7 Hoods. Martin expressed reservations about the tour, wondering whether they could draw as many people as they had in the past. Sinatra and Davis complained during private rehearsals about the lack of black musicians in the orchestra. The tour began at the Oakland-Alameda County Coliseum Arena on March 13, 1988, to a sold-out crowd of 14,500.

Davis opened the show, followed by Martin and then Sinatra; after an interval, the three performed a medley of songs. During the show, Martin threw a lit cigarette at the audience. He withdrew from the tour after just five shows, citing a flare-up of a kidney problem. Sinatra and Davis continued the tour under the title "The Ultimate Event" with Liza Minnelli replacing Martin as the third member of the trio.

Davis's associate stated that Sinatra's people were skimming the top of the revenues from the concerts, as well as stuffing envelopes full of cash into suitcases after the performances. In August 1989, Davis was diagnosed with throat cancer which caused his death in May 1990. He was buried with a gold watch that Sinatra had given him at the conclusion of The Ultimate Event Tour.

A 1988 performance of The Ultimate Event in Detroit was recorded and shown on Showtime the following year as a tribute to the recently deceased Davis. A review in The New York Times praised Davis's performance, describing it as "pure, ebullient, unapologetic show business."

== Reputation ==
Concerning the group's reputation for womanizing and heavy drinking, Joey Bishop stated in a 1998 interview: "I never saw Frank, Dean Martin, Sammy or Peter drunk during performances. That was only a gag! And do you believe these guys had to chase broads? They had to chase 'em away!"

== Films ==
- It Happened in Brooklyn (1947) (Frank Sinatra and Peter Lawford)
- Meet Me in Las Vegas (1956) (Sinatra and Sammy Davis Jr. – cameo appearances)
- Some Came Running (1958) (Sinatra and Dean Martin, co-starring Shirley MacLaine)
- Never So Few (1959) (Sinatra, Lawford, and initially Davis, who was replaced by Steve McQueen)
- Ocean's 11 (1960) (Sinatra, Martin, Davis, Lawford, Angie Dickinson, Joey Bishop, cameo by MacLaine)
- Pepe (1960) (Sinatra, Martin, Davis, Lawford, and Bishop – all cameos)
- Sergeants 3 (1962) (Sinatra, Martin, Davis, Lawford, and Bishop)
- The Road to Hong Kong (1962) (Sinatra and Martin – cameos)
- Come Blow Your Horn (1963) (Sinatra; cameo by Martin)
- Johnny Cool (1963) (Davis and Bishop; Peter Lawford, executive producer; Henry Silva of Ocean's 11 starred, with Mort Sahl and Jim Backus in supporting roles)
- 4 for Texas (1963) (Sinatra and Martin)
- Robin and the 7 Hoods (1964) (Sinatra, Martin, Davis, and initially Lawford, who was replaced by Bing Crosby)
- Marriage on the Rocks (1965) (Sinatra and Martin)
- The Oscar (1966) (Sinatra uncredited, and Lawford)
- A Man Called Adam (1966) (Davis and Lawford)
- Texas Across the River (1966) (Martin and Bishop)
- Salt and Pepper (1968) (Davis and Lawford)
- Sweet Charity (1969) (MacLaine and Davis)
- One More Time (1970) (Davis and Lawford)
- The Cannonball Run (1981) (Martin and Davis)
- Cannonball Run II (1984) (Sinatra, Martin and Davis, plus MacLaine and Silva)

Archival footage of Lawford and Sinatra was used in the 1974 compilation film That's Entertainment!.

Shirley MacLaine appeared in the 1958 film Some Came Running, along with Sinatra and Martin. She had a major role (and Sinatra a cameo) in the 1956 Oscar-winning film Around the World in 80 Days. MacLaine played a Hindu princess who is rescued by, and falls in love with, original Rat Pack associate David Niven, and Sinatra had a non-speaking, non-singing role as a piano player in a saloon, whose identity is concealed from the viewer until he turns his face toward the camera during a scene featuring Marlene Dietrich and George Raft. MacLaine appeared alongside Sinatra in Can-Can. She also had an appearance in the 1960 film Ocean's 11 as a drunken woman. The 1984 film Cannonball Run II, with MacLaine, marked the final time members of the Rat Pack shared theatrical screen-time together.

A biopic titled The Rat Pack, made by HBO in 1998, starred Ray Liotta as Sinatra, Joe Mantegna as Martin, and Don Cheadle as Davis, dramatizing their private lives and, in particular, their roles in the 1960 presidential campaign of John F. Kennedy.

== Music ==
Christmas with the Rat Pack, a collection of holiday tunes sung by Sinatra, Martin and Davis, was released in 2001. The Ultimate Rat Pack Collection: Live & Swingin' went on sale in 2003. A concert featuring the three men, Live from the Sands in Las Vegas, is also available on CD.

== Stage ==
The Rat Pack: Live from Las Vegas tribute show originated on stage in London in 2000 and has been running continuously since then throughout Europe and North America.

== See also ==
- Brat Pack
- Frat Pack
- Rusty nail

== General and cited references ==
- Gehman, Richard (1961). Sinatra and His Rat Pack. Belmont.
- Levy, S. (1998). Rat Pack Confidential. London: Fourth Estate. ISBN 1-84115-001-0.
- Spada, James (1991). Peter Lawford: The Man Who Kept the Secrets. New York: Bantam Books. ISBN 0-553-07185-8.
