= Chris Bezuidenhout =

South Africa international rugby union & league player

- Full name: Christiaan Esias Bezuidenhout
- Born: 13 October 1937 Pretoria, South Africa
- Died: 16 October 2001 (aged 64)
- Height: 1.80 m (5 ft 11 in)
- Weight: 104.3 kg (16 st 6 lb)

Rugby union career
- Position: Prop
Provincial / State sides
Years	Team	Apps	(Points)
- Northern Transvaal
International career
Years	Team	Apps	(Points)
1962	South Africa	3	(0)

Christiaan Esias Bezuidenhout (13 October 1937 – 16 October 2001) was a South African international rugby union player active in the 1960s.

A member of the South African Defence Force, Bezuidenhout played for Pretoria club Defence and represented Northern Transvaal. He obtained three Springboks cap in 1962, as tight–head prop against the touring British Lions.

Bezuidenhout signed with rugby league club Pretoria RLFC in October 1962. By turning professional while still serving, Bezuidenhout ended up court-martialled and was discharged with a caution. He gained selection for the national rugby league team to tour Australia in 1963, but never made the trip.

== See also ==
- List of South Africa national rugby union players
