= Live & Swingin': The Ultimate Rat Pack Collection =

Compilation album by Frank Sinatra, Dean Martin, Sammy Davis Jr.
- Released: October 14, 2003
- Recorded: Various Dates
- Genre: Vocal jazz, pop
- Length: 68:44
- Label: Reprise Records

Live & Swingin': The Ultimate Rat Pack Collection is a 2003 album compiling songs by Frank Sinatra, Dean Martin, and Sammy Davis Jr.

Disc one is a compact disc compiling live performances at a Chicago nightclub between November 26 and December 2, 1962 (over half of which was previously unreleased). Disc two is a 90-minute DVD featuring never-before-issued footage of a St. Louis performance from the mid-1960s with a young Johnny Carson emceeing.

== Reception ==
Professional ratings
Review scores
| Source | Rating |
|---|---|
| AllMusic | 4.5/5 stars |

AllMusic awarded the album four and a half stars and its review by Richie Unterberger stated, "How much you like this sort of thing depends almost as much on how much you like the celebrity sleaze-kitsch that the Rat Pack mythology was built upon as you do the trio's estimable vocal abilities," Unterberger states, "But both parts deliver all the all-around entertainment you'd expect."

== Track listing ==
=== CD ===
1. "Fanfare and Introduction", Frank Sinatra, Dean Martin and Sammy Davis Jr.
2. Medley: "Drink to Me Only with Thine Eyes"/"When You're Smiling"/"The Lady Is a Tramp", Dean Martin
3. "I Left My Heart in San Francisco", Dean Martin
4. "I'm Gonna Sit Right Down and Write Myself a Letter", Dean Martin
5. Medley: "Volare"/"On an Evening in Roma", Dean Martin
6. "Goody Goody", Frank Sinatra
7. "Chicago", Frank Sinatra
8. "When Your Lover Has Gone", Frank Sinatra
9. Monologue, Frank Sinatra
10. "Please Be Kind", Frank Sinatra
11. "You're Nobody till Somebody Loves You", Frank Sinatra
12. "What Kind of Fool Am I?", Sammy Davis Jr.
13. "Out of This World", Sammy Davis Jr.
14. "She's Funny That Way", Sammy Davis Jr.
15. "Hey There", Sammy Davis Jr.
16. Comedy, Frank Sinatra and Dean Martin
17. Medley 1: "Brazil"/"You Are Too Beautiful"/"Cecilia (Does Your Mother ...)", Frank Sinatra and Dean Martin
18. Medley 2: "I Can't Give You Anything but Love, Baby"/"Too Marvelous for Words", Frank Sinatra and Dean Martin
19. "Impressions", Frank Sinatra, Dean Martin and Sammy Davis Jr.
20. "The Birth of the Blues", Frank Sinatra, Dean Martin and Sammy Davis Jr.
21. Danny Thomas Introduction, Frank Sinatra, Dean Martin and Sammy Davis Jr.
22. "Nancy (With the Laughing Face)", Frank Sinatra
23. "Me and My Shadow", Frank Sinatra and Sammy Davis Jr.
24. "Sam's Song", Sammy Davis Jr.and Dean Martin
25. "The Birth of the Blues (Reprise)", Frank Sinatra, Dean Martin and Sammy Davis Jr.

=== DVD ===
1. Johnny Carson Monologue
2. "Send Me the Pillow That You Dream On", Dean Martin
3. "King of the Road", Dean Martin
4. "Everybody Loves Somebody", Dean Martin
5. Medley: "Volare"/"On an Evening in Roma", Dean Martin
6. "You're Nobody Till Somebody Loves You", Dean Martin
7. "My Shining Hour", Sammy Davis Jr.
8. "Who Can I Turn To (When Nobody Needs Me)", Sammy Davis Jr.
9. "I've Got You Under My Skin", Sammy Davis Jr.
10. "You Came a Long Way from St. Louis", Sammy Davis Jr.
11. "You Are My Sunshine", Sammy Davis Jr.
12. "Bee-Bom", Sammy Davis Jr.
13. "One for My Baby", Sammy Davis Jr.
14. "Get Me to the Church on Time", Frank Sinatra
15. "Fly Me to the Moon", Frank Sinatra
16. "Luck Be a Lady", Frank Sinatra
17. "I Only Have Eyes for You", Frank Sinatra
18. "I've Got You Under My Skin", Frank Sinatra
19. "Please Be Kind", Frank Sinatra
20. "You Make Me Feel So Young", Frank Sinatra
21. "My Kind of Town", Frank Sinatra
22. "Happy Birthday", Frank Sinatra, Dean Martin and Sammy Davis Jr.
23. "Birth of the Blues", Frank Sinatra, Dean Martin and Sammy Davis Jr.

== Personnel ==
- Sammy Davis Jr. – vocals
- Frank Sinatra – vocals
- Dean Martin – vocals
- Johnny Carson – emcee
