= Ivan Hall =

British architectural historian (1933–2026)

- Born: 13 February 1933; Manchester, England
- Died: 2 March 2026 (aged 93); England
- Education: Manchester University
- Occupation: Architectural historian
- Known for: John Carr
- Spouse: Elisabeth
- Children: 3, including Maggie Carver

Ivan Hall FSA (13 February 1933 – 2 March 2026) was a British architectural historian who specialised in the architecture of John Carr. His lifelong interests also included neoclassical architecture, the conservation of historic buildings, particularly in Beverley and Hull, and the furniture of Thomas Chippendale.

== Early life and education ==
Hall was born in Manchester to Joseph Henry Hall, an engineer, and his wife Ethel. He won a scholarship to Manchester Grammar School, where he first developed an interest in architecture, becoming The Georgian Group's youngest member at the age of 12. He went on to study at Manchester University. He initially read architecture as a contemporary of Donald Buttress and intended to be a restoration architect, but later changed subject to art history. His PhD thesis was on classical buildings in Manchester.

== Career ==
Hall was an academic in the adult education department at Hull University until 1984, when he moved to London to work for English Heritage. His advisory work with English Heritage was focused on the City of London and included establishments such as the Bank of England, a neoclassical style building by Edwin Lutyens. He taught architectural students on conservation architecture at the Royal Institute of British Architects and the Architectural Association School of Architecture. After two years he and his wife returned to Yorkshire.

Alongside his wife, he campaigned to preserve historic buildings and their environments, particularly the historic hearts of Hull and Beverley, as well as nationally important buildings such as Buxton Crescent in Derbyshire, in part through bodies such as The Georgian Group, Save Britain's Heritage and The Victorian Society. He was an early adopter of listing to protect historic buildings and fought many public enquiries. In the early 1980s he and his wife were among the campaigners who sought − in a case that went to the House of Lords − to prevent development next to Beverley Minster in Yorkshire. Hall also worked at many historic buildings, such as Harewood House, Chatsworth House and Burton Constable Hall.

In addition to numerous articles in, for example, Country Life, The Georgian Group Journal and the Burlington Magazine, Hall's published works include Historic Beverley (1973), Georgian Hull (1979), John Carr of York, Architect: A Pictorial Survey and John Carr of York: Collected Essays (2023).

Hall's personal archive on John Carr was deposited with the Heritage Trust for the North West in Nelson, Lancashire, in 2019.

== Personal life and death ==
Hall met his future wife, Elisabeth Liebeschuetz (died 1995), a Jewish refugee from Germany, on a visit to Castle Howard, and they married in 1961. They had three children, including the businesswoman Maggie Carver.

Hall died on 2 March 2026, aged 93.
