= Miracle on 34th Street (disambiguation) =

Miracle on 34th Street is a popular 1947 film with Natalie Wood and Edmund Gwenn.

Miracle on 34th Street may also refer to:

- Miracle on 34th Street (novella) by Valentine Davies, published in conjunction with the release of the 1947 film
- The Miracle on 34th Street (The 20th Century Fox Hour), 1955 filmed television adaptation with Thomas Mitchell
- Miracle on 34th Street (NBC Friday Night Special Presentation), 1959 live color television adaptation with Ed Wynn
- Miracle on 34th Street: The Musical, 1963 stage adaptation, originally released under the title Here's Love
- Miracle on 34th Street (1973 film), television movie remake with Sebastian Cabot
- Miracle on 34th Street (1994 film), feature film remake with Richard Attenborough
- Miracle on 34th Street (Baltimore), a holiday light display

== See also ==
- 34th Street (disambiguation)
