= Miracle on 34th Street (novella) =

1947 book by Valentine Davies

- First edition (1947) of the novella adaption of the original 1947 film, Miracle on 34th Street
- Author: Valentine Davies
- Language: English
- Genre: Novelization, Children's literature
- Publisher: Harcourt Brace & Company
- Publication date: 1947
- Publication place: United States
- Media type: Print (Hardcover)
- Pages: 120

Miracle on 34th Street (1947) is a best-selling novella by Valentine Davies, based on the story he wrote for the 1947 film of the same name, which earned him an Academy Award for Best Story. After having written the story for the film, Valentine Davies did a novelization of it, which was published as a 120-page novella by Harcourt Brace & Company in conjunction with the film release.

== Origin ==
The inspiration for the story, about a disillusioned woman, her skeptical daughter and a mysterious man who believes he is the real Santa Claus, came when Valentine Davies was standing in line at a big department store during the Christmas season. Davies took his story idea to writer and director George Seaton, who turned it into a screenplay that he titled The Big Heart. 20th Century Fox Studios loved the script and production started in October 1946, with the film then having the working title It's Only Human. In March 1947, the filming was finished and the film went into post-production. Shortly before the release, in June 1947, the film was given the final title of Miracle on 34th Street.

== Adaptations ==
Davies' story has since been the basis of a number of other productions, and has become a favorite Christmas play for a number of American theatrical companies.

Some of the adaptions are:

- CBS-TV's 1955 Miracle on 34th Street is an adaptation by John Monks Jr. and stars Teresa Wright and Thomas Mitchell
- NBC-TV's 1959 Miracle on 34th Street is an adaptation by Harry Miles Mulheim and stars Mary Healy and Ed Wynn
- A Broadway 1963 musical, Here's Love, which is an adaptation by Meredith Willson that starred Janis Paige and Laurence Naismith
- CBS-TV's 1973 Miracle on 34th Street is an adaptation by Jeb Rosebrook and stars Jane Alexander and Sebastian Cabot
- 20th Century Fox's 1994 Miracle on 34th Street is an adaptation by John Hughes and stars Elizabeth Perkins and Richard Attenborough
