= Miracle on 34th Street =

1947 film by George Seaton

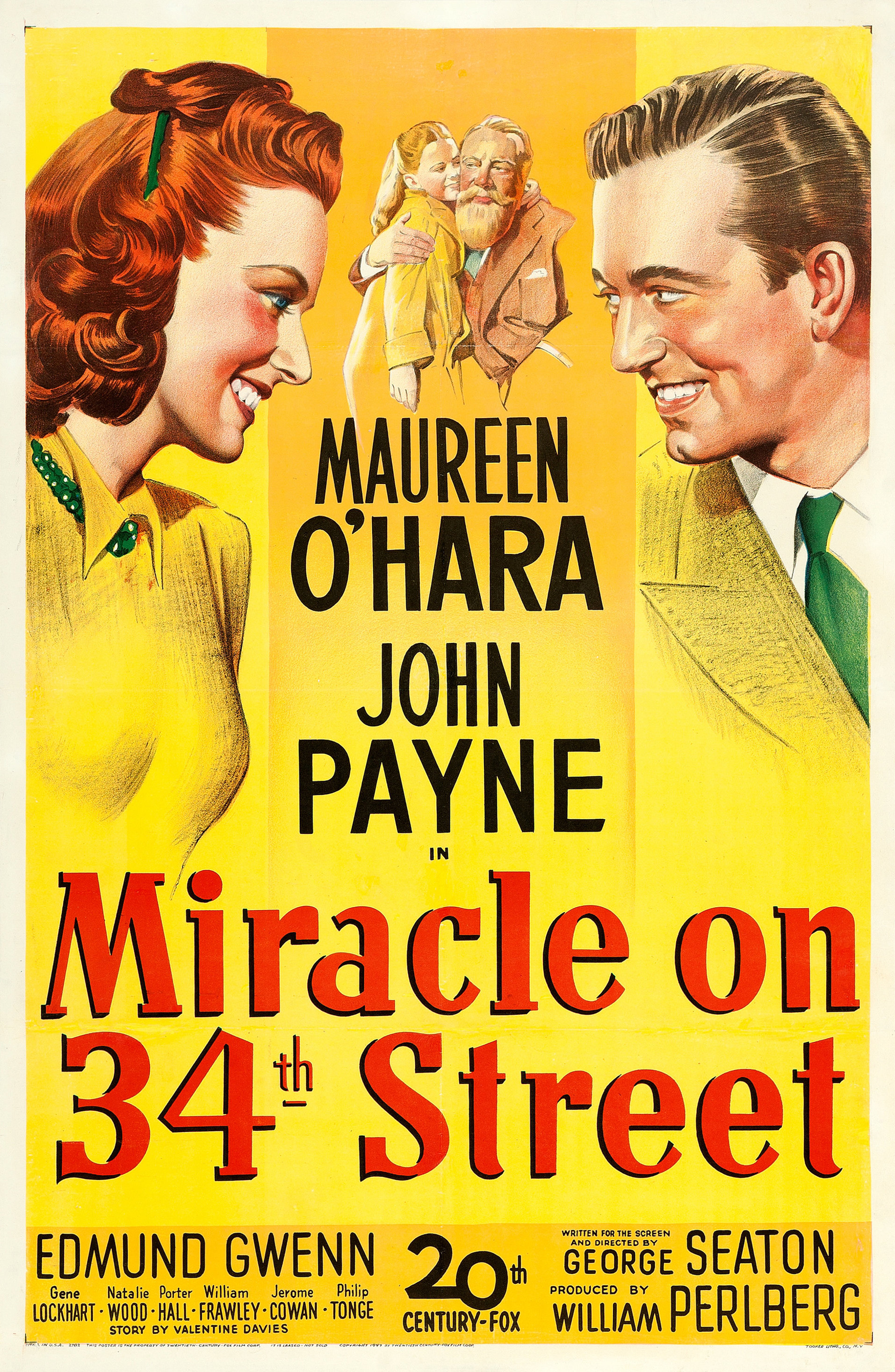
- Theatrical release poster
- Directed by: George Seaton
- Screenplay by: George Seaton
- Story by: Valentine Davies
- Produced by: William Perlberg
- Starring: Maureen O'Hara; John Payne; Edmund Gwenn; Gene Lockhart; Natalie Wood; Porter Hall; William Frawley; Jerome Cowan; Philip Tonge; Jack Albertson
- Cinematography: Charles Clarke; Lloyd Ahern
- Edited by: Robert Simpson
- Music by: Cyril Mockridge
- Distributed by: 20th Century-Fox
- Release date: June 11, 1947
- Running time: 96 minutes
- Country: United States
- Language: English
- Budget: $248,000
- Box office: $2.7 million (US rentals)

Miracle on 34th Street (initially released as The Big Heart in the United Kingdom) is a 1947 American Christmas comedy-drama film released by 20th Century-Fox, written and directed by George Seaton and based on a story by Valentine Davies. It stars Maureen O'Hara, John Payne, Natalie Wood, and Edmund Gwenn. The story takes place between Thanksgiving and Christmas in New York City, and focuses on the effect of a department store Santa Claus who claims to be the real Santa. The film has become a perennial Christmas favorite.

Miracle on 34th Street won three Academy Awards: Gwenn for Best Actor in a Supporting Role, Valentine Davies for Best Writing, Original Story, and George Seaton for Best Writing, Screenplay. The film was nominated for Best Picture, losing to Gentleman's Agreement. In 2005, the film was selected for preservation in the United States National Film Registry by the Library of Congress as being "culturally, historically or aesthetically significant". The Academy Film Archive preserved Miracle on 34th Street in 2009.

Davies also wrote a short novelization of the tale, which was published by Harcourt Brace simultaneously with the film's release.

== Plot ==
On the morning of the Macy's Thanksgiving Day Parade, the man playing Santa Claus is drunk. An old man named Kris Kringle indignantly complains to event director Doris Walker. Doris persuades Kris to play Santa in the parade. A success, Kris is subsequently hired to play Santa at Macy's New York City store on 34th Street.

The toy department head, Mr. Shellhammer, instructs Kris to recommend overstocked items to shoppers. Instead, Kris directs a woman to another store for the hard-to-find fire engine her son wants. Impressed, the woman informs Shellhammer that she will become a loyal Macy's customer.

Attorney Fred Gailey, Doris's neighbor, takes Doris's daughter, Susan, to see Santa. After hearing Kris speak Dutch to an orphan girl from the Netherlands, Susan is amazed. Doris, who has raised Susan not to believe in fairy tales, asks Kris to tell Susan "the truth", but Kris insists that he really is Santa Claus.

Worried, Doris decides to fire Kris, but R. H. Macy, the store's owner, promises bonuses to Doris and Shellhammer because of the positive publicity Kris has generated. To alleviate Doris's misgivings, Shellhammer suggests Granville Sawyer, the store psychologist, administer an evaluation for Kris. After doing so, Sawyer insists Kris is dangerous and should be put in a mental institution. It is Sawyer's opinion that Kris will eventually display "latent maniacal tendencies". Meanwhile, Susan shows Kris a magazine photo of her dream house and tells him she wants it for Christmas. Kris promises to do his best.

In the company cafeteria, young employee Alfred tells Kris that Sawyer convinced him that he is unstable simply because he enjoys dressing as Santa. Kris confronts Sawyer, eventually striking him on the head with an umbrella. Sawyer, outraged, takes Kris to Bellevue Hospital. Tricked into cooperating and believing Doris to be in on the deception, Kris deliberately fails his examination and is recommended for permanent commitment. However, Fred persuades Kris not to give up and represents him in court.

At a hearing before Judge Henry Harper, District Attorney Thomas Mara gets Kris to assert that he is Santa Claus and rests his case, asking Harper to rule that Santa does not exist. In private, Harper's political adviser, Charlie Halloran, warns him that doing so would be disastrous for his upcoming reelection bid. Harper buys time by hearing further evidence. Fred calls Macy as a witness and gets him to admit that he believes Santa exists. Macy then fires Sawyer. Next, Fred calls Mara's own young son, who testifies that his father told him that Santa is real. Mara concedes the point, but goes on to demand that Fred prove that Kris is "the one and only" Santa Claus on the basis of a competent authority by the following day.

Meanwhile, Susan writes Kris a letter to cheer him up, which Doris also signs. When a New York Post Office mail sorter sees Susan's letter, addressed to Kris at the New York courthouse, he suggests delivering all of the dead letters addressed to Santa to Kris, freeing up storage space. As court resumes, Fred is informed of the mail delivery; he argues that the Post Office, a branch of the federal government, has acknowledged that Kris is the one and only Santa Claus by delivering the letters. When the judge insists on seeing the letters, postal employees empty many bags of letters on Harper's desk. Harper dismisses the case.

Kris invites Fred, Doris and Susan to a Christmas Day celebration at his current residence, the Brooks' Memorial Home for the Aged. Susan loses faith in Kris when he admits he was unable to get her the house she wanted. However, after Kris offers Fred and Doris a route home that avoids traffic, Susan sees her dream house with a "For Sale" sign out front; Susan becomes ecstatic and runs into the house. Fred learns that Doris had encouraged Susan to have faith and suggests they purchase the house. Fred and Doris then spot a cane inside that looks just like Kris's. Fred begins to wonder if Kris really is Santa Claus.

== Cast ==
As credited by the American Film Institute.

- Maureen O'Hara as Doris Walker
- John Payne as Fred Gailey
- Edmund Gwenn as Kris Kringle
- Gene Lockhart as the Hon. Henry X. Harper
- Natalie Wood as Susan Walker
- Porter Hall as Granville Sawyer
- William Frawley as Charlie Halloran
- Jerome Cowan as District Attorney Thomas Mara
- Philip Tonge as Julian Shellhammer
- James Seay as Dr. Pierce
- Harry Antrim as Mr Macy
- Thelma Ritter and Mary Field as mothers
- Theresa Harris as Cleo
- Alvin Greenman as Alfred

== Production ==
The original trailer for Miracle on 34th Street omitted any mention of its Christmas themes.

Throughout the process of getting this script accepted by the PCA, the movie underwent multiple title changes, starting as My Heart Tells Me and then progressing into The Big Heart, It's Only Human, and Meet Me at Dawn, and finally ending with the name Miracle on 34th Street. These title changes all happened within a four-month period. These title changes occurred while the filmmakers were fixing any other discrepancies that the PCA required them to fix before the production of the film could begin.

O'Hara was initially reluctant to take the role, having recently moved back to post-war Ireland. She immediately changed her mind after reading the script and came back to the United States for the film.

Payne was on suspension at the studio and took the role to get back into work. However, it was his last film for Fox.

Cecil Kellaway turned down the role of Kris Kringle, which eventually went to his cousin Edmund Gwenn.

Miracle on 34th Street was shot on location in New York City, with the Macy's Thanksgiving Day Parade sequences filmed live while the 1946 parade was happening. "It was a mad scramble to get all the shots we needed, and we got to do each scene only once," O'Hara recalled in her memoir. "It was bitterly cold that day, and Edmund and I envied Natalie (Wood) and John Payne, who were watching the parade from a window."

Arthur Jacobson, assistant director, filmed the Macy's Parade on Thanksgiving morning with nine cameras simultaneously. He said he "plunked actors Edmund Gwenn and Natalie Wood in the department store cafeteria line during a weekday lunch-rush". When O'Hara requested a special police escort for a Christmas shopping spree through Macy's, he said, "I know New Yorkers. They aren't going to pay any attention to you. And don't wear a bandanna around your head or dark glasses. Just be normal."

Although the film is set during the Christmas season, studio head Darryl F. Zanuck, who apparently did not like the film, insisted that it be released in May, arguing that more people go to the movies in warmer weather. The studio rushed to promote it while keeping its Christmas setting a secret. Fox's promotional trailer depicted a fictional producer roaming the studio backlot and encountering such stars as Rex Harrison, Anne Baxter, Peggy Ann Garner, and Dick Haymes extolling the virtues of the film. In addition, the movie posters prominently featured O'Hara and Payne, with Gwenn's character kept in the background. The film opened in New York City at the Roxy Theatre on June 4, 1947. By contrast, modern home video packaging has Gwenn and Wood dominating the imagery, with the DVD release having Kringle in his Santa Claus costume.

== Reception ==
=== Critical reception ===
Miracle on 34th Street mostly received positive reviews from critics. Bosley Crowther of The New York Times said: "For all those blasé skeptics who do not believe in Santa Claus—and likewise for all those natives who have grown cynical about New York—but most especially for all those patrons who have grown weary of the monotonies of the screen, let us heartily recommend the Roxy's new picture, Miracle on 34th Street. As a matter of fact, let's go further: let's catch its spirit and heartily proclaim that it is the freshest little picture in a long time, and maybe even the best comedy of this year." A critic for the BBC called it "a clever and deeply original story, that remains true and confident in direction, while delivering considerable charm all the while." In The Nation in 1947, critic James Agee wrote, "Santa Claus (well played by Edmund Gwenn) comes to Herald Square and wraps up the millennium in one neat package. Clever, and pleased with itself, and liked by practically everybody; but since I have always despised the maxim 'Honesty is the best policy,' I enjoy even less a statement of the profits accruing through faith, loving kindness, etc."

The film is considered by many to be one of the best films of 1947, and it has been dubbed a "Christmas classic" by several publications. On Rotten Tomatoes, the film holds an approval rating of 96% based on reviews from 52 critics, with an average rating of 8.5/10. The website's critics consensus reads, "Irrefutable proof that gentle sentimentalism can be the chief ingredient in a wonderful film, Miracle on 34th Street delivers a warm holiday message without resorting to treacle."

The Catholic Legion of Decency gave the movie a "B", "morally objectionable in part" rating. This was mainly due to the fact that O'Hara portrayed a divorcée in the film.

=== Accolades ===
Gwenn won the Academy Award for Best Actor in a Supporting Role, Valentine Davies for Best Writing, Original Story and George Seaton for Best Writing, Screenplay. The film was nominated for Best Picture, losing to Gentleman's Agreement.

American Film Institute lists:

- AFI's 10 Top 10 – #5 Fantasy Film
- AFI's 100 Years...100 Cheers – #9

In 2005, Miracle on 34th Street was selected for preservation in the United States National Film Registry by the Library of Congress as being "culturally, historically, or aesthetically significant".

== Home media and colorization ==
The film was one of the first full-length black and white films to be colorized.

Miracle on 34th Street was first released on VHS and LaserDisc in 1987.

In 1985, it became one of the first full-length black and white films to be colorized. The 4½-month process was carried out by Color Systems Technology, Inc. In 1993, this version was released on VHS and LaserDisc, and was followed four years later by a "50th Anniversary Edition" on both formats, remastered by THX.

The first DVD release was in October 1999, featuring the original version alongside the original theatrical trailer and a TV spot. In November 2006, it was re-released as a two-disc "Special Edition" DVD, with disc one containing an "all new colorized version" carried out by Legend Films. The second disc had the original version and numerous extras, including The 20th Century Fox Hour's 1955 TV remake. Both discs also included a full-length audio commentary by Maureen O'Hara. The B&W disc has since been re-released several times, including in a pairing with the 1994 remake.

In October 2009, 20th Century Fox released the B&W version on Blu-ray with all previous extras, bar the TV remake.

In 2017, the film was newly restored in 4K resolution; so far this version is only available via DCP (Digital Cinema Package).

== Remake ==
A 1994 feature film starred Richard Attenborough, Elizabeth Perkins, Dylan McDermott, J. T. Walsh, Timothy Shea, James Remar, Jane Leeves, Simon Jones, William Windom and Mara Wilson. It was adapted by John Hughes from the Seaton script, and directed by Les Mayfield.

For the 1994 film, Macy's had declined to grant permission to use its name, so it was replaced by the fictitious "Cole's". "We feel the original stands on its own and could not be improved upon," said Laura Melillo, a spokeswoman for Macy's. Gimbels had ceased business operations in 1987, so its name was replaced by the name of the fictional "Shopper's Express". Alvin Greenman, who played Alfred in the original version, returned to play a doorman. The 1994 remake of the film had a more serious tone than the original 1947 film had and a large portion of the plot was rewritten, although the majority of both the plot and the characters remained intact. The 1994 film also added a subtext which described concerns about religious faith.

== In other media ==
There are numerous remakes of the movie, as well as a Broadway musical.

=== Radio ===
Lux Radio Theatre aired a one-hour adaptation of the movie on three occasions: on December 22, 1947, which starred the original cast including Natalie Wood; on December 20, 1948, without Natalie Wood's participation; and on December 21, 1954. There were also two broadcasts on Screen Directors Playhouse: as a half-hour play on December 23, 1949; and then as a one-hour play on December 21, 1950. All of these adaptations had Edmund Gwenn reprising his screen role.

It was adapted for Australian radio in 1954 as There is a Santa Claus with a script by Morris West.

=== Theatre ===
The earliest adaptation of the film was made by Mountain Community Theater for high school audiences during the 1950s; it continued to be performed after it was eventually licensed in an agreement with 20th Century Fox as "Miracle on 34th Street: the Play".

A 1963 Broadway musical version, entitled Here's Love, was written by Meredith Willson.

The novella was again adapted into a stage play by Will Severin, Patricia Di Benedetto Snyder and John Vreeke in 2000. It is a favorite in many community and regional theaters during the Christmas season. The characters' names are those used in the novella, and the stage setting is distinctly late 1940s.

=== Television ===
A 1955 one-hour television adaptation of the movie starred Thomas Mitchell as Kris, Macdonald Carey as Fred, Teresa Wright as Doris, and Sandy Descher as Susan. This version did not show the drunken Santa at all. Titled The Miracle on 34th Street, it originally aired as an episode of The 20th Century Fox Hour. It was later re-run as "Meet Mr. Kringle".

Ed Wynn played Kris in a 1959 television adaptation of the movie. Also featured was Orson Bean. It was broadcast live and in color on NBC the day after Thanksgiving. NBC made a kinescope of the program, probably for broadcasting opening night on the West Coast. The copy was in a large collection of kinescopes donated by NBC to the Library of Congress and later unearthed by Richard Finegan, who reported his experiences in the December 2005 issue of Classic Images.

A 1973 television version featured Jane Alexander, David Hartman, Roddy McDowall, Sebastian Cabot as Kris (without his natural beard; he was forced to shave and wear a false beard for the role), Suzanne Davidson, Jim Backus, David Doyle and Tom Bosley. It was adapted by Jeb Rosebrook from the George Seaton screenplay, and directed by Fielder Cook. Mrs. Walker's first name is changed to Karen in this version. This would prove to be the final version in which the department store was Macy's. David Doyle, who played R. H. Macy in this version, had played Mr. Sawyer in the original Broadway cast of Here's Love 10 years earlier.

=== Puppets ===
In 2012, the flagship Macy's Department Store at Herald Square in New York City featured a 30-minute puppet version of the story within its Santaland display, featuring the voices of Broadway stars Brian Stokes Mitchell and Victoria Clark.

== See also ==
- Trial film
- List of Christmas films
- Santa Claus in film
