= Miracle on 34th Street (1994 film) =

1994 film by Les Mayfield

- Original theatrical poster
- Directed by: Les Mayfield
- Screenplay by: John Hughes; George Seaton
- Based on: Miracle on 34th Street; 1947 film by: George Seaton; Valentine Davies
- Produced by: John Hughes
- Starring: Richard Attenborough; Mara Wilson; Elizabeth Perkins; Dylan McDermott; J. T. Walsh; James Remar; Robert Prosky
- Cinematography: Julio Macat
- Edited by: Raja Gosnell
- Music by: Bruce Broughton
- Production companies: Hughes Entertainment; Fox Family Films
- Distributed by: 20th Century Fox
- Release dates: November 15, 1994 (Radio City Music Hall); November 18, 1994 (United States)
- Running time: 114 minutes
- Country: United States
- Language: English
- Budget: $28 million
- Box office: $46.3 million

Miracle on 34th Street is a 1994 American Christmas fantasy comedy drama film directed by Les Mayfield and produced and co-written by John Hughes. The film stars Richard Attenborough, Elizabeth Perkins, Dylan McDermott, J. T. Walsh, James Remar, Mara Wilson, and Robert Prosky. It is the first theatrical remake of the original 1947 film. Like the original, this film was released by 20th Century Fox.

== Plot ==
Prior to the Thanksgiving parade, Cole's Department Store's special events director Dorey Walker fires Tony Falacchi, an employee working as the store's Santa Claus, when the latter becomes intoxicated. Immediately trying to find a replacement, she spots an elderly man who had been berating Falacchi and begs him to take over; the man introduces himself as Kris Kringle. Kris does so well during the parade that he is immediately hired by Cole's, despite his apparent belief that he is the real Santa Claus.

Kris is lauded by the children and parents who come to visit him, and his unusual proclivity to direct shoppers to other stores where toys can be bought more cheaply is turned into a successful marketing campaign for Cole's. The sudden turnaround of Cole's, which had only recently survived a hostile takeover bid by Victor Landberg, enrages executives at rival firm Shopper's Express, who are led by Jack Duff.

Dorey is concerned by Kris's influence on her six-year-old daughter Susan, who she has raised not to believe in Santa Claus. Dorey's neighbor, attorney Bryan Bedford, tried to persuade Susan to believe. Kris babysits Susan, who shares with him her Christmas wish for a father, a house pictured in the Cole's Christmas catalogue, and a baby brother. Kris asks if she would begin to believe in Santa if she got all those things, and Susan concurs. The same night, Bryan proposes to Dorey, who rejects his offer and leaves.

Landberg and Duff realize that Kris believes himself to be Santa Claus and lead a plot to destroy his credibility. Duff and his fellow executives pay Falacchi to antagonize Kris in the street and feign an injury when Kris raises his walking stick, leading to Kris's arrest. Bryan provides Kris with legal support and arranges for a court hearing where Kris can make his case. Dorey convinces the chairman of Cole's to show solidarity with Kris, drumming up support from the public. At the court hearing, prosecutor Ed Collins makes the case that Kris is mentally unfit for society, allowing him to state to the court that he is the real Santa Claus.

The night before Christmas Eve, Judge Henry Harper privately confides to Bryan that despite Kris's genuine goodwill, he feels constrained to declare him insane, unless a miracle happens. The next morning, just before he can announce his ruling, and with hundreds of thousands of people demonstrating on the streets of New York, Susan approaches the judge with a Christmas card containing a $1 bill. On the back, the words "In God We Trust" are circled. The judge realizes that if the US Department of Treasury can put its official faith in God on US currency with no required standard of evidence, then the people of New York can place their faith in Santa Claus in the same way. Judge Harper dismisses the case, declaring that Santa is real, existing in the person of Kris Kringle.

Following the court case, Dorey and Bryan are maneuvered by Kris into realizing their true feelings for each other, and, tricked by Kringle to meet in a small ceremony after the Christmas Eve Midnight Mass at St Francis Church of New York, marry using the ring that Bryan had entrusted to Kringle.

On Christmas morning, Susan wakes to the news of the marriage and is elated to find that she has received one part of her Christmas wish. Together, Susan, Dorey, and Bryan drive out to the catalogue house and find that Kris – who has now departed 'overseas' – has arranged for them to purchase it, which they can now afford due to the size of Dorey's Christmas bonus.

With two of Susan's wishes fulfilled, Dorey asks her what the third one was, and she triumphantly announces that it was a baby brother. Dorey and Bryan look at each other, shocked, before glancing down at Dorey's womb and sharing a kiss.

== Cast ==
- Richard Attenborough as Kris Kringle
- Elizabeth Perkins as Dorey Walker
- Dylan McDermott as Bryan Bedford
- J. T. Walsh as Ed Collins
- James Remar as Jack Duff
- Mara Wilson as Susan Walker
- Robert Prosky as Judge Henry Harper
- Jane Leeves as Alberta Leonard
- Simon Jones as Donald Shellhammer
- William Windom as C. F. Cole
- Kathrine Narducci as the mother
- Mary C. McCormack as Myrna Foy
- Alvin Greenman as the doorman
- Allison Janney as a brazen woman shopper in Cole's Christmas Shopping Center
- Greg Noonan as Cmdr. Coulson
- Byrne Piven as Dr. Hunter
- Peter Gerety as a cop
- Jack McGee as Tony Falacchi
- Jennifer Morrison as Denise
- Horatio Sanz as an orderly
- Ron Beattie as a priest
- Joss Ackland as Victor Landberg (uncredited), the owner of a competing store who is eager to see Cole's go out of business so he can buy out the facility and extend his market

Various newscasters were portrayed by Rosanna Scotto, Joe Moskowitz, Lester Holt, Susie Park, and Janet Kauss.

Alvin Greenman had appeared as Alfred in the 1947 original.

== Production ==
In November 1993, it was announced John Hughes would be writing and producing a remake of Miracle on 34th Street for 20th Century Studios for release during the 1994 Holiday season. Voicing his motivations for the remake, Hughes stated he wanted to explore the concept of Kris Kringle coming back to modern times while also carefully handling such a cherished classic. Later that month, Les Mayfield was hired to direct the film. Fox had previously sought out Mayfield to direct John Hughes' produced Baby's Day Out, but due to a contract with Disney wasn't able to accept. According to Richard Attenborough, Mara Wilson's character of Susan Walker was written as a boy in Hughes' initial draft. Much of the filming took place in Chicago. Wilson recalled that she could relate to her character's dilemma over not believing in Santa Claus because she was Jewish and also did believe in the tooth fairy at the time.

The New York City based Macy's department store, which was featured in the original film, declined any involvement with this remake, saying "we feel the original stands on its own and could not be improved upon", despite the fact that Macy's allowed their name to be used in prior television remakes in 1955, 1959, and 1973. This led to the production creating the fictitious "Cole's" as its replacement which despite the name change was analogous to Macy's including filming the Cole's parade at 77th Street and Central Park West which is the starting point for the Macy's Thanksgiving Day Parade and 34th Street only has one major department store, Macy's. Gimbels had ceased operations in 1987; hence it was replaced by the fictional "Shopper's Express".

== Release ==
The film had its premiere at Radio City Music Hall on November 15, 1994, with a 30-minute stage show with scenes from The Radio City Christmas Spectacular featuring The Rockettes as well as a performance from Kenny G. The film had a London premiere as a Royal Film Performance attended by Elizabeth II.

== Reception ==
At the box office, the film opened at #8 with $2.8 million and eventually finished with $17.3 million in North America and $46.3 million worldwide.

Despite being unimpressive at the box office, the film had a successful run on home video where thanks to 20th Century Fox Home Entertainment's strategy of lowering their price in comparison to other family oriented home video releases, Miracle on 34th Street sold an estimated 8 million videocassettes on its debut on home video with estimates of roughly four to-five times its box office gross.

On Rotten Tomatoes, the film has a score of 59% based on reviews from 34 critics, with an average rating of 6.2/10. TV Guide called the film "curiously depressing", while Desson Howe of The Washington Post said, in contrast to the 1947 version, "[it] will not be found on television (or its computer equivalent) half a century from now." Its supporters included Gene Siskel and Roger Ebert, who gave the film "two thumbs up" on their show. Michael Medved of Sneak Previews said "This is the new holiday classic America has been waiting for."

Audiences polled by CinemaScore gave the film an average grade of "A" on an A+ to F scale.

== Soundtrack ==
=== Track listing ===
No.	Title	Writer(s)	Performer	Length
1.	"Overture"	Bruce Broughton	Bruce Broughton	2:40
2.	"Jingle Bells"	James Pierpont	Natalie Cole	3:35
3.	"It's Beginning to Look a Lot Like Christmas"	Meredith Willson	Dionne Warwick	2:23
4.	"Have Yourself a Merry Little Christmas"	Hugh Martin; Ralph Blane	Kenny G	3:56
5.	"Santa Claus Is Comin' to Town"	John Frederick Coots; Haven Gillespie	Ray Charles	3:04
6.	"Joy to the World"	Isaac Watts; George Frideric Handel	Aretha Franklin & Members of the FAME Freedom Choir	3:04
7.	"Santa Claus Is Back in Town"	Jerry Leiber; Mike Stoller	Elvis Presley	2:26
8.	"Signing"	Bruce Broughton	Bruce Broughton	2:05
9.	"Bellevue Carol"	Bruce Broughton	Bruce Broughton	2:15
10.	"Song for a Winter's Night"	Gordon Lightfoot	Sarah McLachlan	3:47
Total length:				29:15

- Track listing verified from the album's liner notes.

== Home media ==
Miracle on 34th Street was released on VHS in 1995. It was released on DVD on October 31, 2000. Subsequent DVD releases were November 11, 2008, and October 4, 2009. It was released on Blu-ray on October 6, 2009, October 11, 2011, and October 20, 2020.

== See also ==
- Miracle on 34th Street (1947)
- Miracle on 34th Street (1973)
- List of Christmas films
- Santa Claus in film
