= Kathleen Cody (actress) =

American actress

- Kathleen Cody in 2003
- Other name: Kathy Cody
- Education: Professional Children's School
- Occupations: Theatre, Film, and Television Actor
- Years active: 1965–1988
- Known for: Hallie/Carrie Stokes on Dark Shadows
- Notable work: Here's Love
- Television: Dark Shadows; Snowball Express; Charley and the Angel; Superdad; The Crucible
- Partner: Jahn Avarello (deceased)
- Children: Megan
- Parent(s): James and Mary Cody

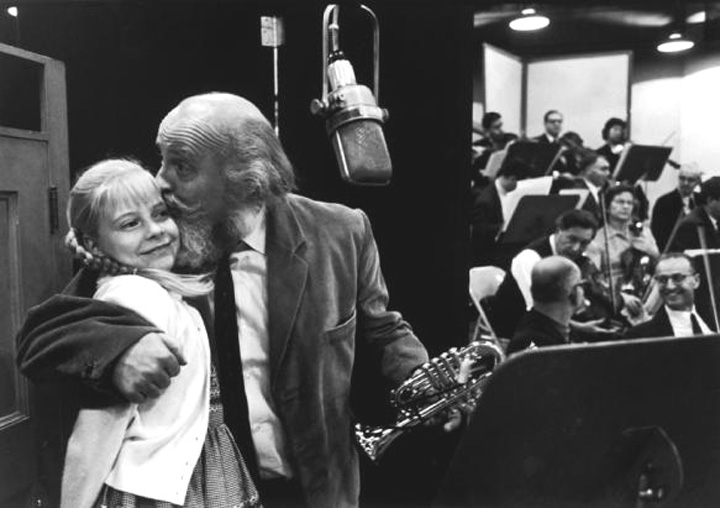
Kathleen Cody and Laurence Naismith recording the cast album for Here's Love (1963)

Kathleen Cody, often credited as Kathy Cody, is an American actress. She is best known for her role as the characters Hallie Stokes and Carrie Stokes, on the television series Dark Shadows, appearing from June 1970 through April 1971. Her career in film and television lasted over 30 years.

== Career ==
=== Modeling ===
Cody appeared in her first television commercial when she was six months old and continued to work steadily as a child fashion model. She appeared in television commercials, including one with Louis Armstrong. She also appeared in commercial advertisements and on magazine covers, modeling for New York photographers, including Richard Avedon and Francesco Scavullo.

=== Theatre ===
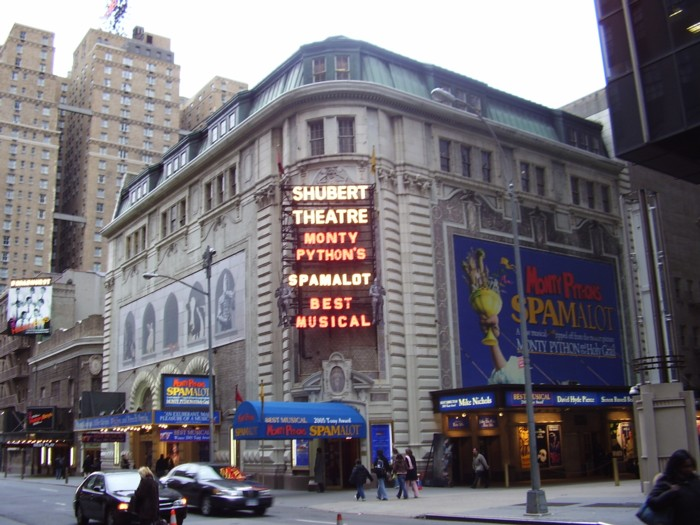
Shubert Theatre in Manhattan

When Cody was seven years old, she was cast in the theatre production of Uncle Willie, with Menasha Skulnik at the Coconut Grove Playhouse in Miami, Florida.

In 1963, at the age of nine, Cody was named one of the original cast members of the Broadway show Here's Love, appearing in the role of Hendrika. The musical production was written by Meredith Willson, who earlier wrote The Music Man and The Unsinkable Molly Brown. Here's Love was an adaptation of the film Miracle on 34th Street and was introduced at the Sam S. Shubert Theatre on Broadway in New York City. Cody's costars included Janis Paige, Craig Stevens, Laurence Naismith, Fred Gwynne, and Dom DeLuise. During the play, Cody had a duet on the song, "The Bugle", with Naismith, who played the role of Kris Kringle. Cody remained with the production for the entire run, last appearing on July 25, 1964, when the play eventually closed after 334 shows and two previews.

=== Television ===
In 1965, Cody started her daytime television career with regular long running parts on the CBS daytime soap operas The Edge of Night as Laurie Ann Karr, As the World Turns as Sally Graham, and The Secret Storm as Cecilia, before becoming a regular cast member of the ABC gothic soap opera Dark Shadows. She also appeared in the first episode of the Peter Falk series, The Trials of O'Brien, titled "Over Defense Is Out". She made special appearances on the Jackie Gleason Show, Perry Como Show, Jan Murray Show, and The Bell Telephone Hour Christmas Special with Florence Henderson.

In 1967, Cody was cast as Betty Parris, in David Susskind's television production of Arthur Miller's The Crucible, which starred George C. Scott, Melvyn Douglas, Colleen Dewhurst, and Tuesday Weld. In 1967, the show was nominated for, and won three Emmy Awards, including the Primetime Emmy Award for Outstanding Single Performance by an Actor in a Leading Role in a Drama for Scott, Outstanding Single Performance by an Actress in a Leading Role in a Drama for Dewhurst, and Outstanding Directorial Achievement in Drama for Alex Segal at the 20th Primetime Emmy Awards.

Upon completion of The Crucible, Cody was cast in an episode of the PBS anthology series NET Playhouse. The episode was an adaptation of novelist and playwright, Colette's 1922 play, My Mother's House (originally entitled La Maison de Claudine), starring Dewhurst. The play was written as an homage to Colette's mother, Adèle Eugénie Sidonie "Sido" Colette. The story follows Colette as she reminisces about her childhood and her relationship with her mother. Cody portrayed the playwright, Colette, from adolescence up through the author's teenage years.

Cody has guest-starred in numerous prime time television shows, including 3 episodes of Gunsmoke with actors James Arness, James Whitmore, Richard Jaeckel, Buck Taylor, Nicholas Hammond and Louise Latham; The Partridge Family with David Cassidy; Doc Elliot with James Farentino; the Love, American Style segment "Love and the Model Apartment" with Davy Jones as her character Ruth's newlywed husband Ray; Barbary Coast with William Shatner and Doug McClure; The Waltons with Richard Thomas, Ralph Waite, and Will Geer; Cannon, guest-starring in a dual role with William Conrad, Mitchell Ryan, and Ralph Meeker; Three for the Road with Vincent Van Patten; Barnaby Jones with Buddy Ebsen and Kristoffer Tabori; and Dirty Sally with Jeanette Nolan.

In 1976, Cody was cast in the starring role of Snowy in a television pilot, entitled The Cheerleaders, which was directed by Richard Crenna. The show was a situation comedy about the "misadventures of Snowy, B.J., and Beverly, three fun-loving high school girls. The pilot episode focuses on the girls, members of the cheerleading team, as they perform embarrassing pledge week antics for a sorority house they hope to join." The story takes place in a small California town during the 1950s. Starring alongside Cody were Debbie Zipp, Theresa Medaris, Mary Kay Place and Darel Glaser. The show was broadcast on August 2, 1976.

=== Film ===
In 1973, Cody left New York to appear in her first Hollywood film, Hot Summer Week (later entitled Girls on the Road), along with Ralph Waite and Michael Ontkean, who was also making his American film debut. Cody's appearance in Hot Summer Week prompted Walt Disney Studios to invite her to screen-test for work with their studios. The successful audition resulted in Disney Studios signing her to a three-picture contract. She was the last actress signed to a contract by Disney Studios, since Annette Funicello.

Snowball Express, directed by Norman Tokar, was the first film Cody completed for Disney Studios and was followed by Charley and the Angel, directed by Vincent McEveety and starring Fred MacMurray and Cloris Leachman as her character Leonora Appleby's parents Charley and Nettie, as well as Harry Morgan. Her love interest Ray Ferris was portrayed by Kurt Russell. In 1974, Leachman was nominated for a Golden Globe Award for Best Actress – Motion Picture Musical or Comedy for her performance at the 31st Golden Globe Awards. The film was released on March 23, 1973. However, the film was a major flop for Walt Disney Productions, with negative reviews and a huge financial loss.

Cody completed her three-picture deal with Disney, appearing in the film Superdad, again directed by Vincent McEveety. She starred in the film along with Bob Crane and Barbara Rush, as her character Wendy McCready's parents Charlie and Sue. The film also starred Kurt Russell as Bart, portraying Cody's love interest for the second time, and Bruno Kirby and Ed Begley, Jr. The film was released on December 14, 1973.

In 1972, Cody relocated to Los Angeles. She co-starred in three television Movies of the Week. She first appeared in a remake of the 1945 film Double Indemnity, which originally starred Fred MacMurray and Barbara Stanwyck. Cody portrayed the character Lola Dietrickson, played in the original film by Jean Heather. The 1972 adaptation starred Richard Crenna, Lee J. Cobb, and Samantha Eggar.

In 1975, Cody appeared in her second telemovie, Babe, a biographical film about Babe Didrikson, who was named the 10th greatest North American athlete of the 20th century by ESPN, and the ninth greatest athlete of the 20th Century by the Associated Press. Written by Joanna Lee, the film was an adaptation of Didrikson's autobiography, entitled, This Life I've Led. Directed by Buzz Kulik, the film starred Susan Clark in the title role, for which she won an Emmy for her performance at the 28th Primetime Emmy Awards. Alex Karras appeared in the film as Babe's husband George Zaharias, while Cody appeared in the supporting role of Sue Ellen.

In 1975, Cody appeared in the Vincent McEveety-directed film The Last Day, starring Richard Widmark, Barbara Rush, Tim Matheson and Robert Conrad. Cody appeared in the supporting role of Julia Johnson as Emmet Dalton (Matheson)'s love interest. The western-genre film was released on February 15, 1975.

While she had previously retired from acting, relocating from Los Angeles to Jacksonville, Florida, Cody responded to a 1987 call for local actors to appear in the Peter Bogdanovich directed film Illegally Yours. She was cast in a minor supporting role in the film, which starred Rob Lowe, Colleen Camp, and Kenneth Mars. The film was released on May 13, 1988.

== Personal life ==
In 1975, Cody returned to the east coast, settling in Connecticut. She married in 1979 and in 1981, her daughter, Megan, was born. In 1983, she returned to Los Angeles, when she was cast in the Stephen J. Cannell television series,The Rousters, starring Chad Everett, Jim Varney, and Mimi Rogers. When the series was cancelled after one season, Cody moved to Florida.

In 2010, Cody appeared at the annual Dark Shadows Festival convention in Burbank, California, as one of the original cast members of the cult classic daytime drama. Alternating between Los Angeles and New York, the event is an annual, three-day fan festival that has been held every year since 1983.

As of 2011, Cody lived in Florida with her partner, Jahn Avarello, until his death, September 20, 2012. Avarello and Cody both attended Manhattan's Professional Children's School where they first met in 7th grade. In August 2011, Cody appeared at the 45th Anniversary of the Dark Shadows Festival with Avarello by her side. The festival was held in New York City.

== Filmography ==
Television credits

| Year | Title | Role | Notes |
|---|---|---|---|
| 1965 | The Edge of Night | Laurie Ann Karr | |
| 1965 | The Trials of O'Brien | Dinah | episode "Over Defense Is Out" |
| 1966 | As the World Turns | Sally Graham | |
| 1966 | The Secret Storm | Cecilia | |
| 1967 | The Crucible | Betty Parris | |
| 1968 | My Mother's House | Colette | |
| 1970 | Dark Shadows | Hallie Stokes/Carrie Stokes/Carrie Stokes (PT) | |
| 1973 | The Partridge Family | Dina Firmly | |
| 1973 | Love, American Style | Ruth | episode "Love and the Model Apartment" |
| 1974 | Doc Elliot | | episode "No Place to Go" |
| 1974 | Dirty Sally | Samantha | |
| 1974 | The Waltons | Audrey Butler | episode "The Ring" |
| 1974 | Gunsmoke | Cynthia/Anna May/Melissa | |
| 1975 | Cannon | Daphne Simmons/Gail Dexter | |
| 1975 | Barbary Coast | Leslie Budwing | |
| 1975 | Three for the Road | Shelley | |
| 1975 | Barnaby Jones | Sherry | |
| 1976 | The Cheerleaders | Snowy | |

Film credits

| Year | Title | Role | Notes |
|---|---|---|---|
| 1973 | Hot Summer Week | Debbie | |
| 1973 | Snowball Express | Chris Baxter | |
| 1973 | Charley and the Angel | Leonora Appleby | |
| 1973 | Superdad | Wendy McCready | |
| 1973 | Double Indemnity | Lola Dietrickson | |
| 1975 | Babe | Sue Ellen | |
| 1975 | The Last Day | Julia Johnson | |
| 1988 | Illegally Yours | Cable TV Housewife | |
