= 34th Street station =

34th Street station may refer to:

== Current stations ==
- 34th Street station (Hudson–Bergen Light Rail), a light rail station in Bayonne, New Jersey
- 34th Street station (SEPTA Metro), a subway station in Philadelphia, Pennsylvania
- 34th Street–Herald Square station, a subway station in Manhattan, New York
- 34th Street–Hudson Yards station, a subway station in Manhattan, New York
- 34th Street–Penn Station (IND Eighth Avenue Line), a subway station in Manhattan, New York
- 34th Street–Penn Station (IRT Broadway–Seventh Avenue Line), a subway station in Manhattan, New York

== Former stations ==
- 34th Street station (IRT Second Avenue Line), an elevted station in Manhattan, New York
- 34th Street station (IRT Third Avenue Line), an elevted station in Manhattan, New York
- 34th Street station (IRT Ninth Avenue Line), an elevted station in Manhattan, New York

== See also ==
- 34th Street (disambiguation)
