= Doc Elliot =

- Genre: Medical drama
- Created by: Allen S. Epstein
- Developed by: Lewis John Carlino
- Starring: James Franciscus
- Theme music composer: Marvin Hamlisch
- Composer: Earl Hagen
- Country of origin: United States
- Original language: English
- No. of seasons: 1
- No. of episodes: 14 (list of episodes)

Production
- Running time: 60 minutes
- Production companies: Corsican Productions; Lorimar Productions

Original release
- Network: ABC
- Release: October 10, 1973 – May 1, 1974

Doc Elliot is an American medical drama series that aired on ABC from October 10, 1973, until May 1, 1974, beginning in a Wednesday time slot it shared with Owen Marshall, Counselor at Law.

== Premise ==
Dr Benjamin R. Elliot (James Franciscus) is a successful New York City doctor who decided to leave Bellevue Hospital, drop out of the big-city rat race, and take on a new job as a doctor in Gideon, in the backwoods of southern Colorado. Most of his house calls had to be made via plane or four-wheel drive vehicles as his practice covered over 600 square miles. Mags Brimble (Neva Patterson) is the widow of the former town’s doctor, who became Elliot’s helper. Barney Weeks (Noah Beery) owns the town’s general store. Eldred McCoy (Bo Hopkins) works as a bush pilot.

== Cast ==
- James Franciscus as Dr. Ben Elliot
- Neva Patterson as Mags Brimble
- Bo Hopkins as Eldred McCoy
- Noah Beery as Barney Weeks

== Production ==
Although the show is set in the Colorado Rocky Mountains, it was filmed in California's Los Padres National Forest. Franciscus trained in handling medical props in preparation for the show. Charlie Hanna saw the hazard of another medical show featuring a "busybody" doctor telling patients how to live.

== Reception ==
Television columnist Rick Du Brow described Doc Elliot as "technically well-made" but "hokey and predictable." Critic Jay Sharbutt admired the scenery surrounding the show's "hack plot" and "plumb awful dialogue".

== Episodes ==
No.	Title	Directed by	Written by	Original release date
0	"Pilot"	Robert Butler	Lewis John Carlino	March 5, 1973
Urban physician Doc Elliot relocates to a rural area to enjoy a less hectic life. One of his first patients is a young man suffering from depression, because he feels responsible for the accident that maimed his older brother. Guest stars: Joe Don Baker, Jim Antonio, Perry Lopez and Verna Bloom.
1	"And All Ye Need to Know"	Robert Totten	Sandor Stern	October 10, 1973
Doc Elliot treats Jenny (played by Meredith Baxter), a blind woman who is very dependent on her reclusive husband. When Ben suggests an operation that will restore Jenny's eyesight, her spouse opposes the procedure, fearing that his wife will leave him. Guest stars: Woodrow Chambliss, William Mims and Mills Watson.
2	"A Man of Importance"	Harry Harris	Charles McDaniel	November 3, 1973
Paul Bartlett (Will Geer) is an eccentric elderly man who owns valuable property that others covet. He is determined to have grandson Jamie (Leif Garrett) inherit it, but his behavior leaves his sanity in question. Doc Elliott is asked to sign off to have him committed. Guest stars: Leonard Stone, Russell Thorson and George DiCenzo.
3	"The Touch of God"	Robert Totten	Anthony Lawrence	January 23, 1974
Doc Elliot finds himself challenged when his patients turn to a faith healer for their illnesses. Ben's years of medical training are at odds with the community's spiritual beliefs. Guest stars: Royal Dano, Tyne Daly, Gail Bonney and Ford Rainey.
4	"No Place to Go"	Daniel Haller	Walter Black	January 30, 1974
A car accident victim turns out to be a young man on the run from the law, who forces Doc to drive him to Mexico. Guest stars: John David Carson, Kathleen Cody, Maggie Malooly and R.L. Armstrong.
5	"A Small Hand of Friendship"	Robert Totten	Alan Savage	February 6, 1974
One of Ben's patients is Bonnie Ames (Beverly Garland), an unmarried schoolteacher. After learning she is pregnant, she knows the community will pressure her to quit her job. Doc Elliot vows to stand behind her during this difficult time. Guest stars: Clint Howard, Dee Carroll, Leonard Stone and John Mitchum.
6	"The Runner"	Edward M. Abroms	Richard Carr	February 13, 1974
Doc Elliot sees a young man who doesn't want to follow in his father's footsteps as a bronco-buster. The patient, named Gary (Sam Bottoms) has over-exerted himself by constantly running. Doc soon learns that Gary's father Stuart (Morgan Woodward) is very disapproving and rigid; consequently, Gary 'escapes' by running. Guest star: Harry Carey Jr.
7	"The Carrier"	Harry Harris	John McGreevey	February 20, 1974
Cases of typhoid begin occurring in the small community and Doc looks for the source. His investigation leads him to a young couple who are intent on keeping a secret. Guest stars: Heather North, Anthony Geary, John Lupton, Jeanne Cooper and Lonny Chapman.
8	"A Time to Live"	James Sheldon	Walter Black	February 27, 1974
Lee Barrows (Sam Elliott) learns he has leukemia and returns to the town where he grew up, to die by himself. Doc Elliot counsels Lee and his wife Pamela (Katherine Justice) about different options, while trying to make the dying man comfortable. Guest star: John Mitchum
9	"A Time to Grow"	Harry Harris	Sandor Stern	March 6, 1974
Samantha Wells (Susan Brown) is a well-known New York actress who has relocated to Colorado to improve her son's asthma. Her son, Robert (Brandon Cruz), chafes because of the many restrictions but finds an ally in Doc Elliot who helps his mother better understand his condition. Guest stars: Ike Eisenmann, Kathrine Baumann, Sally Kemp and Victor Kilian.
10	"The Gold Mine"	Robert Totten	T : Sandor Stern; S/T : John Kingsbridge	March 13, 1974
Emma Johnson (Edith Atwater) is anxious to keep her gold mine, because the men that work in it frequently fall ill and are getting old. Unfortunately, they've been unable to extract enough gold to pay the debts or even the payroll. Desperate to find a new vein, the miners resort to stealing supplies and creating an unsafe new tunnel. Guest stars: Merle Haggard, Hoke Howell, Ken Mayer, Heidi Vaughn and Karl Swenson.
11	"Survival"	Harry Harris	Robert Earll	March 27, 1974
Doc and his companions are stuck in the wilderness after a plane crash. Guest stars: John Ericson, Kathrine Baumann, Phillip Pine, Harry Hauss and Christine Belford.
12	"Things That Might Have Been"	James Sheldon	Skip Webster	April 3, 1974
The father of a young woman with facial scars is reluctant to allow her to have reconstructive surgery. Guest stars: Joan Blackman, Lane Bradbury, Tim O'Connor and Stuart Nisbet.
13	"The Brothers"	James Brown	Don Ingalls	April 10, 1974
A carefree Native American youth crashes his speeding motorcycle, seriously injuring his brother who was riding with him. In sorrow, the youth goes into the mountains to offer himself as sacrifice for his brother's health. Doc Elliot finds the youth near death from exposure. Guest stars: Victor Mohica, Cal Bellini, Howard Platt and Victoria Racimo.
14	"The Pharmacist"	Sandor Stern	S : Gerri Chuchian; S/T : Sandor Stern	May 1, 1974
Doc Elliott must convince pharmacist Gus Turners (Paul Fix) that his age no longer allows him to do his job properly. Guest stars: John Karlen, Rutanya Alda, Jordan Rhodes and Mitch Vogel.
