= Will Stanton (author) =

American humorist

William Frank Stanton (October 16, 1918 – December 31, 1996) was an American humorist whose short stories and articles appeared in monthly magazines such as Reader's Digest, Woman's Day, Saturday Evening Post and The New Yorker. He wrote four books, one of which was published posthumously, and hundreds of stories and articles.

== Biography ==
Stanton was born in Cleveland, Ohio on 16 October 1918. He was born to Frank White Stanton and Marie Seelbach Stanton. Frank White Stanton was a descendant of William White, a Mayflower pilgrim, through his son, Peregrine White. Marie Seelbach Stanton was a daughter of German immigrants. Frank White Stanton served as mayor of Chagrin Falls.

When Will was fifteen years old, his youngest brother, John, was born by emergency cesarean section and their mother died eight days later of complications. Their father raised his four sons with the help of housekeepers.

Being born in 1918 and living his teenage years during the depression had positive effects on Will Stanton's outlook on life. He believed life was simpler then, he was not wasteful, and he valued the lessons and skills he gained growing up at a time when families did more for themselves. He retained fond memories of his upbringing that were represented in his writing, particularly in his second book, THE GOLDEN EVENINGS OF SUMMER.

Will grew up nearby in Chagrin Falls, attended Princeton University, where he earned a degree in English, and then joined the Army Air Corps, where he served as a flight officer and flew glider planes in France during the Second World War.

After the war, Stanton began working as a full-time freelance writer and moved to Bolinas, California. He returned to Chagrin Falls in the mid-fifties, still writing full-time, and participated in the Chagrin Falls Little Theater, where he acted lead roles, including as Charles in "Blithe Spirit". It was there that he met his second wife, Elizabeth "Betty" Kain Oldham. The couple had seven children, six of them boys, all of whom provided ample material for stories. From Chagrin Falls, Will moved his family to Mantua, Ohio; then to Cambridge, Maryland; New London, Connecticut; and, finally, to his wife's family home in Harrisburg, Pennsylvania, where after ten years, he died. As long as there was a post office, he could live anywhere, he would say.

== Humorous short stories and articles ==
Some of Will Stanton's best-known articles were "How to Tell a Democrat from a Republican" (Ladies' Home Journal, November 1962), which was read into the Congressional Record and has been used in classrooms as a learning tool; "There's No Mayonnaise in Ireland" (Reader's Digest, May 1971) and "Rumpelstiltskin, He Said His Name Was" (Reader's Digest, August 1969). "November" (Woman's Day, November 1969) was read for several years every November 1 by Jim Mader on radio station WIBA in Madison, Wisconsin. His story "Barney", about a rat who outsmarts a scientist, and "Dodger Fan", about a Mars alien coming to earth and being introduced to the game of baseball, were both published in the 1950s and have been the most requested articles for reprint in English books in Norway, Germany, Canada, and the US, and in science fiction anthologies.

Will's stories and articles were published for forty years in

- An American Christmas
- Annabel
- Atlantic Monthly
- Boy's Life
- Catholic Digest
- Cavalcade
- Chatelaine
- Christian Living
- Contemporary
- Coronet
- Elks, The
- Ellery Queen, Brazil and Chile
- Esquire
- Every Woman
- Family Digest
- Fantasy & Science Fiction, US and British editions
- Good Housekeeping
- Home and Gardens
- Ladies' Home Journal
- Life
- Look
- McCall's
- Milestones to Encounters
- Moments with Father
- Never in This World
- New Dawn
- New Yorker
- Northeast (Hartford Courant)
- Norton Reader
- Pan Am Clipper
- The Phoenix Nest
- Reader's Digest, which made Stanton a staff writer, offering a stipend in exchange for first refusal on appropriate stories
- Redbook
- Sarie
- Saturday Evening Post
- Saturday Review
- Sports Illustrated
- Star Weekly Fiction
- Time
- Valley Views
- Venture
- Weight Watcher's
- Woman
- Woman's Day, which sent Stanton and his family on several trips for the purpose of gathering story material. Destinations were Washington DC, during the Cherry Blossom Festival; Disneyland (California); St. Augustine, Florida; Philadelphia, Pennsylvania; and New York City, during the Christmas season
- Woman's World
- Worst Contact
- Yankee

Some articles have been included on the "Will Stanton, Author" Facebook page.

== Anthologies in which Stanton's work appeared ==
- Staircase to Writing and Reading, Prentice-Hall
- Rebels, Ginn and Co
- Channel One, Dickenson Publishing Co
- Words and Beyond, Ginn and Co
- Scope, Harper and Row
- The Best From Fantasy and Science Fiction, Ace Books, various volumes

== Books ==
- Once Upon A Time Is Enough, satirical analyses of seven traditional fairy tales. Published by J.B. Lippincott Company in 1970. Illustrated by Victoria Chess.
- The Golden Evenings of Summer, a story of youth, life, and the opportunities for making money during Prohibition. Published by McCall Publishing in 1971 in hardcover, in German by Hornemann, and in paperback by Lancer Books. Walt Disney Productions bought rights to the book and based their movie Charley and the Angel on it.
- The Old Familiar Booby Traps of Home, twenty-two humorous vignettes of the American family at home. Published by Doubleday and Company in 1977.
- A Likely Story, the story of Warren Plowright and how he went from predictable and quiet to being chased by the Mob and the FBI. Published by CreateSpace in 2012.
