= 34th Street =

34th Street most commonly refers to 34th Street (Manhattan), a major cross-town street in New York City.

It may also refer to:

- 34th Street Magazine, a weekly arts and entertainment magazine by The Daily Pennsylvanian, the student newspaper of the University of Pennsylvania
- 34th Street station (disambiguation), stations of the name

== See also ==
- Miracle on 34th Street (disambiguation)
