= Me and the Orgone =

Book by Orson Bean

Me and the Orgone – The True Story of One Man's Sexual Awakening
- Author: Orson Bean
- Cover artist: Annette Orban
- Language: English
- Subject: Psychology
- Publisher: orig. Fawcett Crest Greenwich, republished ACO Press
- Publication date: orig. 1971, republished 2000
- Publication place: United States
- Media type: Print (Paperback)
- ISBN: 0-9679670-1-5
- OCLC: 48816147
- LC Class: RZ460 .B43 2000

Me and the Orgone – The True Story of One Man's Sexual Awakening (1971) is an autobiographical account written by American actor Orson Bean about his life-changing experience with the controversial orgone therapy developed by Austrian psychiatrist Wilhelm Reich.

The book tells how, after ten years of unsuccessful psychotherapy, Bean discovers medical orgone therapy, a therapeutic intervention that focuses on renewing what it describes as "energy flows" within the patient, orgone being Wilhelm Reich's name for the "life energy". It is a strongly personal account of a man who gets a second chance at a personal sexual revolution, feeling his body beginning to change, feeling freer and more alive, and also seeing his relationships transformed.

The book includes a foreword by Scottish educator A. S. Neill.

It also contains information on the former Fifteenth Street School in New York City where Dr. Reich's concepts were applied to childhood education.

According to a review in Time, Bean's account is "clear and balanced", discussing Reich's "final tragic swerve toward insanity" even as it "over-insists ... his greatness." Me and the Orgone has been cited in several books on the topic of orgone energy, including Charles R. Kelley's Life Force: The Creative Process in Man and in Nature and investigative journalist Mary Coddington's Seekers of the Healing Energy, in which she described Me and the Orgone as a good source for understanding the workings of Reich's orgone therapy treatments. In Fury on Earth: A Biography of Wilhelm Reich, Myron Sharaf describes Me and the Orgone as a vivid view of Reich's therapeutic process.

== Sources ==
- Me and the Orgone from The Education Revolution
- American College of Orgonomy Information and therapy referral
