= First Lutheran Church of Venice =

Church in Venice, California, United States of America

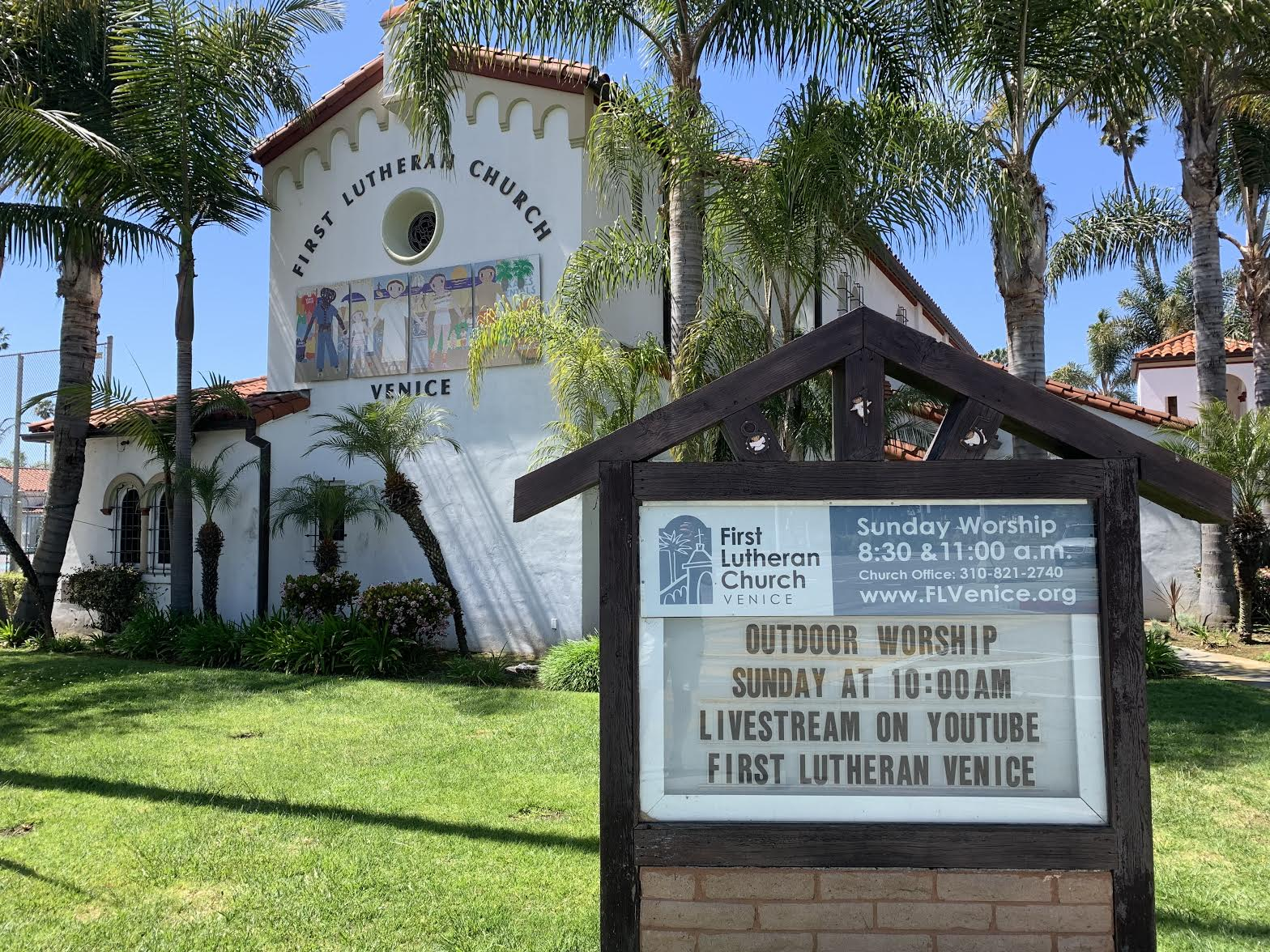
- Exterior of the Church as of April 2021
- First Lutheran Church of Venice
- 33.992856°N 118.456085°W
- Location: 815 Venice Blvd., Venice, Los Angeles, California
- Denomination: Lutheran Church–Missouri Synod
- Website: flvenice.org

Architecture
- Architectural type: Church
- Style: Mission Revival

Administration
- District: Pacific Southwest

First Lutheran Church of Venice is a congregation in the Lutheran Church–Missouri Synod (LCMS) founded in 1944 on the westside of Los Angeles. It serves the communities of Venice, Mar Vista, and Marina del Rey, and is in the Pacific Southwest District of the LCMS. The church offers both traditional and contemporary services and ran the First Lutheran School of Venice a Lutheran elementary school on the Westside of Los Angeles established in 1948. After 70 years in the Venice community, the church decided to close the school in 2018.

With 331 members as of 2006, it is the third largest LCMS congregation in Los Angeles and the largest in its circuit, which includes churches in Beverly Hills, Inglewood and Santa Monica.

Venice is home to a thriving artistic community, and First Lutheran is described as "an 'art friendly' church" that hosts programs "looking at the divine through visual arts, readings and music." Since 2001, the church has hosted a Masters in the Chapel music series which has featured performances by artists from the Los Angeles Philharmonic, Los Angeles Chamber Orchestra, Los Angeles Baroque Orchestra, and Los Angeles Master Chorale. The series began in the wake of the church's restoration efforts following a 1998 electrical fire which gutted the sanctuary, and concerts took advantage of the church's new "acoustically reverberant hall in which everything sounds entrancing." The church's pipe organ, installed in 2004, was designed by the same builder of organs at Walt Disney Concert Hall and the Cathedral of Our Lady of the Angels, and is also featured in the musical events.

The church also features an exterior mural, Jesus Roller Skating with Friends in Venice Beach, created in 1997 by Ft. Maur Van Doorslaer, a Benedictine monk from St. Andrew's Abbey in the Antelope Valley.

== In popular culture ==
In an episode of Safe At Home, Orson Bean writes in a light vein about the decision of his wife Alley Mills to be baptized as an adult by the pastor of First Lutheran, where the couple had been attending services regularly for several years, and of walking down to the beach together with "Pastor Ken," to fulfill Ally's wish to be baptized within the waters of the Pacific Ocean. For many years, Bean and Mills played roles in the Church's annual production of A Christmas Carol; Bean played Ebenezer Scrooge.
