= Scott Kolden =

American actor (born 1962)

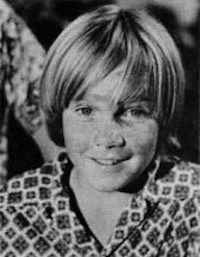
- Scott Kolden, circa 1973
- Born: Scott Cary Kolden; February 11, 1962 (age 64); Torrance, California
- Occupations: Actor, sound engineer
- Years active: 1971–1980 (actor); 1993–present (sound engineer)
- Spouse: Lorraine Vanek (m. 1985)
- Children: 6

Scott Cary Kolden (born February 11, 1962) is an American sound engineer and former child actor. Beginning his professional show business career at the age of eight, Kolden is perhaps best known for his Disney film roles; as Leonard in The Mystery in Dracula's Castle and as Rupert in Charley and the Angel, as well as for his role as Scotty on the NBC Saturday morning children's series Sigmund and the Sea Monsters.

== Early life ==
Kolden was born in Torrance, California, the son of Janet Louise (née Wilford) and Lloyd Cameron Kolden. His father was a design supervisor for Hughes Aircraft. Kolden grew up with an older sister, Karen Patricia Kolden (b. 1957), an older brother, Lloyd Cameron "Cam" Kolden, Jr. (b. 1958) and later, a younger sister, Katherine Courtney Kolden (b. 1977).

== Career ==
=== Actor ===
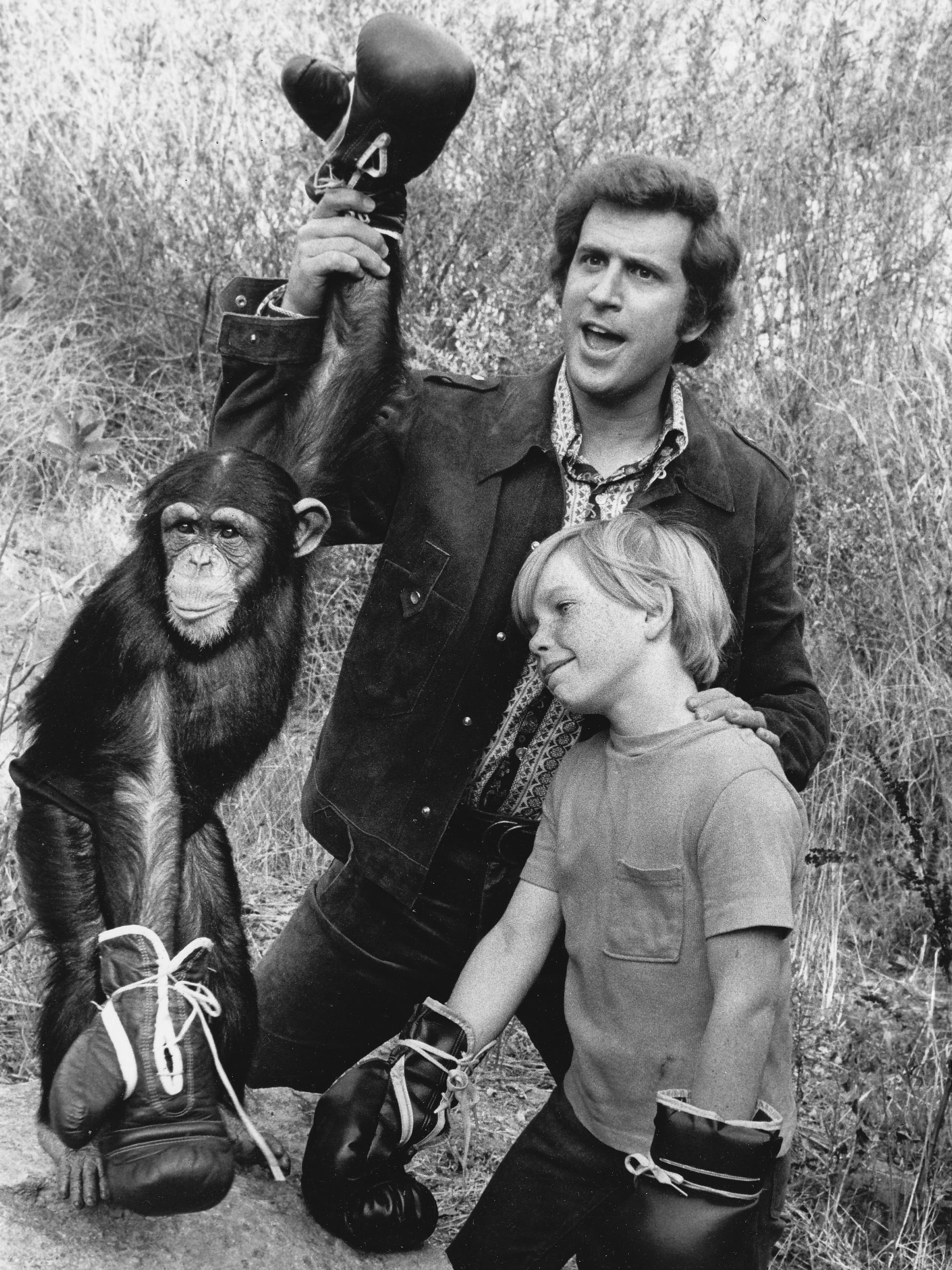
Kolden (front) with Me and the Chimp co-stars, Ted Bessell and "Buttons", 1971

From the time he was a baby, friends commented on Kolden's photogenic looks, suggesting to his mother that she get him into show business. Years later, when recounting how he began his acting career, Kolden explained, "I got started at about 7½ [or] 8-years-old. I was just the little kid that was kind of the ham-bone. I'd do funny voices and I was putting on a show for the relatives and friends and I guess enough people bugged mom saying 'Gee you oughta get him in show business.'"

Kolden's mother took him to a commercial talent agent. The agency signed him, sent him on three auditions, and he was promptly hired for all three commercials. Kolden continued, "I guess I just had the right look at the right time [because] every [audition] I seemed to go on, I just started getting them." After starting as essentially a child model in commercials, Kolden quickly transitioned to acting roles.

In January 1971, The Los Angeles Times reported that Paramount Television was filming a new pilot for CBS, tentatively titled The Plumbum. The pilot reportedly starred Kenneth Mars and Kolden as a bachelor plumber and his young cousin, however, no record of the pilot or subsequent series having aired has been found. According to IMDb, Kolden made his television debut in a small role as Bobby on the 1971 comedy series Funny Face. The following year, he landed a co-starring role as Scott Reynolds, the son of Ted Bessell and Anita Gillette on the short-lived CBS comedy series Me and the Chimp.

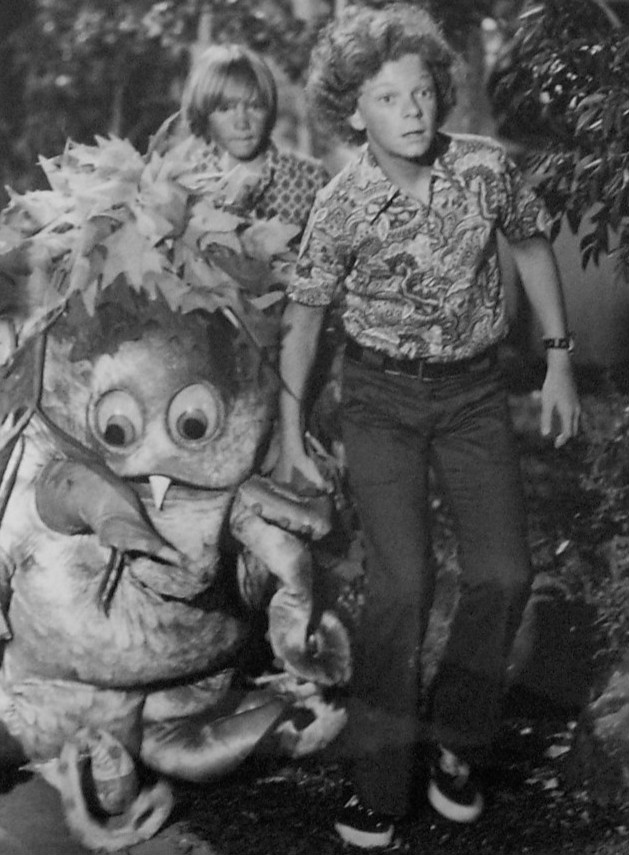
Kolden (back) with Sigmund co-stars Billy Barty and Johnny Whitaker, 1973

In January 1973, Kolden co-starred as Leonard Booth alongside Johnny Whitaker as his brother, Alfie in The Wonderful World of Disney two-part television film, The Mystery in Dracula's Castle. In March of that year, he made his feature film debut co-starring as Rubert Appleby, the son of Fred MacMurray and Cloris Leachman in the Walt Disney family film Charley and the Angel. In 1976, Kolden starred as Joey Fields, a boy who befriends a Killer Whale at Marineland in the feature film A Whale of a Tale (although earliest reports of a release date to 1976, records indicate the film was shot circa 1972).

In 1973, Kolden landed his co-starring role as Scotty Stuart on the Sid & Marty Krofft Saturday morning comedy-fantasy series Sigmund and the Sea Monsters, once again paired alongside fellow child star Johnny Whitaker as his brother, Johnny. The series was a success and aired on NBC from 1973 to 1975, becoming the first Krofft Saturday morning series to be picked up for a second season and co-starring such veteran character actors as Billy Barty, Mary Wickes, Rip Taylor and Margaret Hamilton, among others.

On September 7, 1973, Kolden also appeared as Scotty Stuart on the NBC Saturday Morning Preview special introducing the new Saturday morning offerings of the 1973–1974 season alongside fellow Sigmund co-stars, Johnny Whitaker and Billy Barty. In 1980, Kolden made his final on-screen appearance as Steve, the son of Jim Davis in the science-fiction feature film, The Day Time Ended.

=== Sound engineer ===
In 1993 Kolden began a career as a sound engineer, working as a sound mixer and sound effects editor on over 200 films and television series, including The X-files, Everybody Loves Raymond, Pinocchio's Revenge and Leprechaun 3, as well as working on the Disney channel children's series Hannah Montana, The Suite Life of Zack & Cody and Cory in the House.

In 2000, Kolden won the Golden Reel Award for his work on the children's film Alvin and the Chipmunks Meet Frankenstein and in 2004, was nominated for an Emmy Award for his work on the dramatic television film 44 Minutes: The North Hollywood Shoot-Out.

== Personal life ==
During his years working on Sigmund and the Sea Monsters, Kolden attended Wilmington Junior High School in Wilmington, California. His favorite hobbies at that time were sports, playing drums, baseball and riding his unicycle. After leaving show business, Kolden graduated from Phineas Banning High School in Wilmington, California in 1979.

On October 19, 1985, Kolden married Lorraine Vanek. He is the father of six children: four sons and two daughters.

Since February 2003, Kolden has served as Technical Arts Director at Discovery Church in Simi Valley, California.

== Filmography ==
This filmography lists only Kolden's film and television appearances as an actor. See the "External links" section below for an IMDb link to a complete filmography of his work as a sound engineer.

Film
| Year | Film | Role | Notes |
|---|---|---|---|
| 1973 | Charley and the Angel | Rupert Appleby | — |
| 1976 | A Whale of a Tale | Joey Fields | Filmed in 1972 |
| 1980 | The Day Time Ended | Steve Williams | — |
Television
| Year | Program | Role | Notes |
| 1971 | The Plumbum | Little Cousin | Unaired pilot |
| 1971 | Funny Face | Bobby | Episode: "Don't Worry, I'll Manage" |
| 1972 | Me and the Chimp | Scott Reynolds | 13 episodes |
| 1973 | Walt Disney's Wonderful World of Color | Leonard Booth | "The Mystery in Dracula's Castle" |
| 1973 | NBC Saturday Morning Preview | Scott Stuart | Special |
| 1973–1975 | Sigmund and the Sea Monsters | Scott Stuart | 29 episodes |

== Awards ==
| Year | Award | Category | Work | Result | Ref. |
|---|---|---|---|---|---|
| 2000 | Golden Reel Award | Best Sound Editing - Direct to Video - Sound Editorial | Alvin and the Chipmunks Meet Frankenstein | Won | |
| 2001 | Golden Reel Award | Best Sound Editing - Direct to Video - Sound Editorial | An American Tail: The Mystery of the Night Monster | Nominated | |
| 2001 | Golden Reel Award | Best Sound Editing - Television Mini-Series - Effects & Foley | Sally Hemings: An American Scandal | Nominated | |
| 2001 | Golden Reel Award | Best Sound Editing - Television Movies and Specials - Effects & Foley | Operation Sandman | Nominated | |
| 2004 | Golden Reel Award | Best Sound Editing in Television Long Form - Sound Effects & Foley | 44 Minutes: The North Hollywood Shoot-Out | Nominated | |
| 2004 | Emmy Award | Outstanding Sound Editing for a Miniseries, Movie or a Special | 44 Minutes: The North Hollywood Shoot-Out | Nominated | |
