= The Day Time Ended =

- Directed by: John Cardos
- Screenplay by: Wayne Schmidt; J. Larry Carroll; David Schmoeller
- Story by: Steve Neill
- Produced by: Charles Band; Paul Gentry; Steve Neill; Wayne Schmidt
- Starring: Jim Davis; Dorothy Malone; Christopher Mitchum; Marcy Lafferty; Scott Kolden; Natasha Ryan
- Narrated by: Jim Davis
- Cinematography: John Arthur Morrill
- Edited by: Ted Nicolaou
- Music by: Richard Band
- Distributed by: Compass International Pictures
- Release date: November 1980
- Running time: 79 minutes
- Country: United States
- Language: English
- Budget: est. $600,000

The Day Time Ended is a 1980 American science fiction film directed by John 'Bud' Cardos and starring Jim Davis, Christopher Mitchum and Dorothy Malone.

== Plot ==
The film opens with an unseen narrator stating that time is not as we normally think of it, and that yesterday, today and tomorrow are constantly with us.

A father and his elder son, an architect, welcome back the rest of their family from an extended vacation to a new, state-of-the-art home away from Los Angeles in the Sonoran Desert. They are disturbed to find the interior in disarray, and suspect a break-in, though nothing is missing. Then there are news reports of a spectacular triple supernova, and the young granddaughter sees a strange, glowing construction behind the barn, which is not there when the adults investigate. The elder son then leaves for the city, where he has some important work to complete.

Later in the evening, UFOs are seen soaring overhead, and appear to land in the nearby hills. The family experience problems with their electrical power, and the granddaughter sees and has a telepathic encounter with a tiny glowing green humanoid figure. The mother, too, sees one of these diminutive creatures beckoning to her, but she ignores it and it soon vanishes.

The father, while trying to start the car, sees a strange creature approaching in the distance, and he goes inside the house to warn his family. Afterward, two gigantic reptilian creatures appear and fight each other to the death right outside the house. These creatures, along with a small flying craft that resembles a camera, try to break into the house, but eventually they disappear. The father speculates that they have somehow fallen into a warp in spacetime.

The family decide to pack up and get away from the house to the city for the night, but the car will not start, so they decide to walk. Meanwhile, the elder son, who has been unable to contact them because the phones are not working, begins to make his way back home, but the sight of more UFOs causes him to crash his car, so he begins to walk back. The rest of the family, also out in the desert, become separated: the grandparents and their younger son from the daughter-in-law and the granddaughter.

After some time, the entire family is reunited, and from the top of a rise they see in the distance a gleaming domed city. They walk on to seek refuge there.

== Cast ==
- Jim Davis as Grant Williams
- Dorothy Malone as Ana Williams
- Christopher Mitchum as Richard Williams
- Marcy Lafferty as Beth Williams
- Scott Kolden as Steve Williams
- Natasha Ryan as Jenny Williams
- Roberto Contreras as Gas Station Attendant

== Production ==
The film was originally conceived by script writers Steve Neill, Paul Gentry, and Wayne Schmidt. The three offered a script for another project to producer Charles Band, who thought it was too expensive to make but offered to produce a science-fiction film if it was based in one or two locations. The music score was done by Richard Band, Charles' brother. It was his first orchestral score, going to London to record with New London Symphony. Between 45 and 50 minutes of music was recorded during the six hour session. Months later, record label Varèse Sarabande contacted Band to make it a digital album, making it the first digital soundtrack ever released, beating out Star Trek: The Motion Picture by two weeks.

== Release ==
The movie was released on video cassette in 1997 under Charles Bands' Full Moon Studios as part of their "Cult Video" collection.

== Reception ==
In Creature Feature, the movie received 2 out of 5 stars, finding the effects nice and the cast watchable, but the story slight. Bill Warren from Fantasy Newsletter criticized the film for having no story coherence, and spoke negatively of the stop-motion animation for having the wrong "movement-to-frame ratio", making the final result look like it was shot underwater. TV Guide gave it one star, calling it "derivative" and "overly ambitious" while giving specific criticism towards its special effects and stop-motion animations. Alan Jones for Radio Times also gave it one star, comparing the special effects to cardboard while calling the movie a "crudely assembled affair". In 1980, Marcy Lafferty was nominated for "Best Supporting Actress" at the 7th Saturn Awards, but lost to Veronica Cartwright for Alien.

Director John "Bud" Cardos did not speak favorably of his experience making the film and considers it to be the worst film he directed.

== Mystery Science Theater 3000 ==
The film is one of six movies featured in Season 12 of Mystery Science Theater 3000.
