= Charley and the Angel =

1973 family/comedy film by Vincent McEveety

- Theatrical release poster
- Directed by: Vincent McEveety
- Written by: Will Stanton (book author); Roswell Rogers (film writer)
- Produced by: Bill Anderson
- Starring: Fred MacMurray; Cloris Leachman; Harry Morgan; Kurt Russell
- Cinematography: Charles F. Wheeler
- Edited by: Bob Bring; Ray de Leuw
- Music by: Paul J. Smith; Buddy Baker
- Production company: Walt Disney Productions
- Distributed by: Buena Vista Distribution
- Release date: March 23, 1973
- Running time: 93 minutes
- Country: United States
- Language: English

Charley and the Angel is a 1973 American fantasy comedy film directed by Vincent McEveety, based on Will Stanton's 1971 novel The Golden Evenings of Summer, and starring Fred MacMurray in his final film for Disney. The film is set in an unidentified small city in the 1930s Depression-era Midwestern United States.

== Plot ==
Charley Appleby is a hardware store owner whose frugality and commitment to his job have enabled his family to avoid poverty during the Great Depression and Prohibition. However, his relationship with his children and wife Nettie (Cloris Leachman) is strained. They especially want to go to see the Chicago World's Fair. His growing sons Willie and Rupert (Vincent Van Patten and Scott Kolden) manage to find work in a junkyard owned by a man named Felix with ties to bootleggers, and his teenage daughter Leonora (Kathleen Cody) decides to elope with a young man named Ray (Kurt Russell), who seems untrustworthy.

Charley is visited by a shabby-looking angel (Harry Morgan) who appears visible only to him. The angel tells Charley that his time will soon be up, and the shopkeeper decides to become religious, patch relations with his family, sell his business, and do the best he can to be a good father and husband before he dies. Charley's angel appears intermittently throughout the film, occasionally helping Charley, and occasionally causing mischief. The angel reveals his name as Roy Zerney.

Charley is initially unsuccessful at effecting change. His gestures are incomprehensible to his wife and children, who see his sudden change of behavior as bizarre, particularly his decision to sell the store. Charley appears ostensibly insane whenever he speaks to, or looks for, the lingering angel who is visible only to him. When Charley tries to take money from his account in the bank, he learns from the banker Ernie (Edward Andrews) that the bank will be closing for a while and may be in danger of foreclosure. He must loan money to son-in-law Ray, and to his friend Pete (George Lindsey). Business tightens, and Charley is running out of time and money.

However, Charley becomes an unlikely hero. His boys begin using a rickety Model T, unknowingly delivering illegal booze by Felix's request, and they are kidnapped and forced to drive away when the Chicago gangsters responsible for the operation are trying to flee the city. Charley personally chases them in the abandoned gangsters' car, dodging gunfire, and the police catch him presuming he is the criminal. While in prison, Roy tells Charley that today will probably be his last day on Earth, but Charley's thoughts are still of his boys.

When he returns home in the evening, Leonora and Ray return for an untimely visit just as the gangsters occupy his house and intend to take Charley's wife as another hostage. Charley defies them and defends his wife and kids with his own life. The fight ends when Charley and Ray, with the assistance of a timely appearance by Pete, succeed in defeating the gangsters and delivering them to the police. In the course of the fight, Charley was shot at point-blank range but miraculously receives no wound.

For capturing the criminals, Charley receives a $5000 reward posted by Chicago's police department. Ernie appears as a representative of the town to honor Charley as a town hero and present him with a hotel reservation and tickets to the World's Fair. He also informs them that the bank examiner has approved the bank's credibility and that it will be reopening tomorrow. Pete has also returned to repay his debt.

Charley, satisfied with the turn of events in his final day, says goodbye to his family and expects that he will still die, but Roy appears and reveals that the eleventh-hour decision in Heaven was to let Charley live. Roy physically intervened and pulled the bullet from the air, thus nullifying the prophecy and clarifying to Charley that he will live on, with an enriched outlook.

== Cast ==
- Fred MacMurray as Charley Appleby
- Harry Morgan as The Angel (Roy Zerney)
- Cloris Leachman as Nettie Appleby
- Kathleen Cody as Leonora Appleby
- Scott Kolden as Rupert Appleby
- Vincent Van Patten as Willie Appleby
- Kurt Russell as Ray Ferris
- George Lindsey as Pete
- Edward Andrews as Ernie
- Mills Watson as Frankie Zuto
- Richard Bakalyan as Buggs
- Barbara Nichols as Sadie
- Kelly Thordsen as Policeman
- Liam Dunn as Sprague
- Larry D. Mann as Felix
- George O'Hanlon as Police Chief
- Susan Tolsky as Miss Patridge
- Ed Begley Jr. as Derwood Moseby
- Christina Anderson as Susie
- Roy Engel as Driver
- Pat Delaney as Girl in Sadie's Place
- Robert Hastings as News Reporter
- Jack Griffin as Policeman #2

== Music ==
The film's score was written by Buddy Baker. The film features one original song, "Livin' One Day at a Time", written by Shane Tatum and Ed Scott. The song plays during the film's opening credits and is reprised at the film's conclusion.

== Reception ==
Actress Cloris Leachman was nominated for a Golden Globe in the category of Best Actress in Musical/Comedy. The film was re-edited for television on the Walt Disney anthology television series in 1977.

== Home media ==
Walt Disney Studios Home Entertainment has released Charley and the Angel on VHS in 1986 and on DVD in 2011 as an exclusive from the now closed Disney Movie Club.

The film is absent from streaming on Disney+.

== See also ==
- List of films about angels
