= Me and the Chimp =

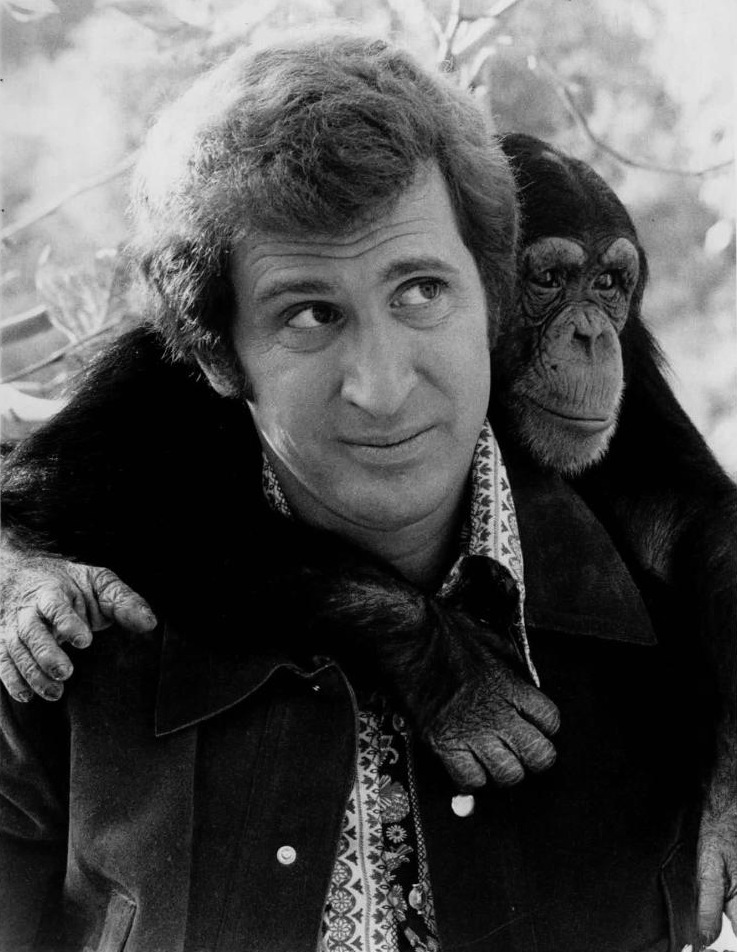
- Ted Bessell and Buttons
- Created by: Garry Marshall; Thomas L. Miller
- Starring: Ted Bessell; Anita Gillette; Scott Kolden; Kami Cotler
- Composer: Charles Fox
- Country of origin: United States
- No. of seasons: 1
- No. of episodes: 13

Production
- Executive producer: Garry Marshall
- Producer: Alan Rafkin
- Running time: 30 minutes per episode
- Production company: Paramount Television

Original release
- Network: CBS
- Release: January 13 – April 27, 1972

Me and the Chimp is an American sitcom which aired for one season during 1972 on CBS. It was created by Garry Marshall and Thomas L. Miller and produced by Alan Rafkin for Paramount Television.

== Premise ==
Mike Reynolds is a dentist who lives with his wife, two children, and a chimpanzee named Buttons, who is a washout from the space program (a fact unknown to Mike and his family until an old army sergeant visits).

Episodes revolve around Buttons' doings or undoings, such as extending the line Mike drew on a map (to mark their driving route) onward to a ghost town, and stealing an alarm clock which gets Mike arrested for public indecency (in his pajamas).

== Cast ==
- Ted Bessell as Mike Reynolds
- Anita Gillette as Liz Reynolds
- Scott Kolden as Scott Reynolds
- Kami Cotler as Kitty Reynolds
- Jackie as Buttons

== Production ==
The series was created by Garry Marshall and Thomas L. Miller, both of whom are better known for their later work on Happy Days and Laverne & Shirley. Bessell originally refused to participate when the title was first given as the "grammatically incorrect" (sic) "The Chimp and I".

The chimpanzee who portrayed Buttons was owned by veteran animal expert Lou Schumacher and was trained by Bob Rydell who was responsible for teaching the chimpanzee to perform its "acting" tasks on cue by responding to various hand and voice signals.

== Episodes ==
No.	Title	Written by	Original release date
1	"Mike's Day With Buttons"	Garry Marshall	January 13, 1972
Mike's life as a dentist becomes more complicated when his daughter brings home a chimpanzee named Buttons.
2	"My Pet, The Thief"	Garry Marshall & Thomas L. Miller	January 20, 1972
Mike fights a losing battle trying to convince his wife and children that they cannot keep Buttons.
3	"Mike's Burglar Alarm"	Garry Marshall & Thomas L. Miller	January 27, 1972
The effort of Mike to train Buttons to ring a bell when a stranger enters the house backfires when a burglar offers Buttons candy.
4	"Mike the Matchmaker"	Garry Marshall & Thomas Miller	February 3, 1972
Buttons meets a female chimpanzee named Mildred that he's attracted to, but when Mike attempts to discuss the situation with the other chimpanzee's owner, he's distracted by the chimpanzee's baby sitter, a beautiful Swedish blonde.
5	"Mike's Big Act"	Mickey Rose	February 17, 1972
Mike reluctantly agrees to use Buttons during his magic act before the PTA, which results in him trying to teach Buttons some entertaining tricks.
6	"The Lost Flashlight"	Garry Marshall & Thomas L. Miller	February 24, 1972
After Buttons loses his flashlight at a drive-in movie theater, the chimpanzee keeps the neighborhood in turmoil while the item is missing.
7	"One Romantic Evening"	Garry Marshall & Thomas L. Miller	March 2, 1972
Mike and Liz are all set to celebrate their wedding anniversary alone, but Buttons ends up causing havoc while Liz's mother watches the children.
8	"Tennis Anyone?"	Garry Marshall & Thomas L. Miller	March 16, 1972
Buttons helps Mike cure a small case of bigotry at the local country club.
9	"The Paint Job"	Garry Marshall & Thomas L. Miller	March 23, 1972
The Reynolds are chosen by a paint manufacturer as the ideal family to demonstrate their product on television, but Buttons ends up causing chaos.
10	"The Ghost Town"	Garry Marshall & Thomas L. Miller	March 30, 1972
A planned weekend trip to the snow country ends up in a deserted ghost town.
11	"Mike's Night-In"	Garry Marshall & Thomas Miller	April 6, 1972
The Reynolds family learn that Buttons was once part of the US space program and the government retains ownership. Mike is determined to fight to keep their beloved chimpanzee.
12	"Hoop-Lah Gary Nelson"	Ron Friedman	April 13, 1972
After Mike squabbles with his son's basketball coach, he takes over the coaching of the team, which eventually involves Buttons.
13	"Liz's Allergy"	Garry Marshall & Thomas L. Miller	April 27, 1972
While Mike is out of town at a dentists' convention, Liz develops an allergy that appears to be connected to the presence of Buttons.

== Reception ==
TV Guide listed the show at #46 on its 2002 list "The 50 Worst Shows of All Time".
