= Superdad =

1974 American comedy film by Vincent McEveety

- Theatrical release poster
- Directed by: Vincent McEveety
- Written by: Joseph L. McEveety; Harlan Ware
- Produced by: Bill Anderson
- Starring: Bob Crane; Barbara Rush; Kurt Russell; Joe Flynn; Kathleen Cody
- Cinematography: Andrew Jackson
- Edited by: Ray de Leuw
- Music by: Buddy Baker
- Production company: Walt Disney Productions
- Distributed by: Buena Vista Distribution
- Release date: December 14, 1973
- Running time: 95 minutes
- Country: United States
- Language: English
- Box office: $7 million (US/Canada rentals)

Superdad is a 1973 American comedy film by Walt Disney Productions starring Bob Crane, Barbara Rush, Kurt Russell, Joe Flynn, Joby Baker, and Kathleen Cody and directed by Vincent McEveety.

== Plot ==
Charlie McCready (Bob Crane) tries to wrest his daughter Wendy (Kathleen Cody) from her childhood friends, who he believes have no ambition. He especially disapproves of her boyfriend, Bart (Kurt Russell). Initially he makes a few attempts to bridge the generation gap, but to no avail. For instance, he attempts to impress his daughter's friends by trying his hand at beach volleyball and water skiing, but both attempts result in humiliating accidents.

Late in the summer, Wendy receives a letter informing her that she has won a full scholarship to her parents' alma mater, Huntington College. Unbeknownst to her, the letter is fake; her father has paid the first year's tuition himself and had a friend at the college send the letter to her. He did this so Wendy would not attend City College with Bart and her other friends.

Charlie later visits Wendy at Huntington, and discovers that the college has changed considerably since he attended there. Wendy later discovers his plot, and joins the campus counterculture as a way of getting even. She inadvertently becomes engaged to a hippie artist named Klutch. Charlie attempts to intervene on her behalf, and ends up in a fistfight with Klutch. Bart comes to the rescue. At this point, Charlie learns that Bart had turned down a scholarship to Huntington College so he could be near Wendy, and deduced that she had not really been awarded a scholarship there. The film ends with Wendy's marriage to Bart.

== Cast ==
- Bob Crane as Charlie McCready
- Barbara Rush as Sue McCready
- Kurt Russell as Bart
- Joe Flynn as Cyrus Hershberger
- Kathleen Cody as Wendy McCready
- Joby Baker as Klutch
- Dick Van Patten as Ira Kushaw
- Bruno Kirby as Stanley Schlimmer
- Judith Lowry as Mother Barlow
- Ivor Francis as Dr. Skinner on TV
- Jonathan Daly as Rev. Griffith
- Naomi Stevens as Mrs. Levin
- Nicholas Hammond as Roger Rhinehurst
- Jack Manning as Justice of the Peace
- Jim Wakefield as House Manager
- Ed McCready as Cab Driver
- Larry Gelman as Mr. Schlimmer
- Stephen Dunne as TV Moderator
- Allison McKay as Secretary
- Leon Belasco as Limousine Driver
- Sarah Fankboner as Scout Girl
- Christina Anderson as Gang
- Ed Begley Jr. as Gang
- Don Carter as Gang
- Joy Ellison as Gang
- Ann Marshall as Gang
- Michael Rupert as Gang

== Music ==
The film's score was written by Buddy Baker. The film features three original songs by Shane Tatum. "These Are the Best Times" was sung by Bobby Goldsboro and played during the film's opening credits. A group of altar servers reprises the song as Wendy (Kathleen Cody) processes into the church for her wedding during the film's final scene. "Los Angeles" was sung by the cast as Stanley (Bruno Kirby) drives the group of friends back to the McCready's home from the beach in his boss's ambulance. "When I'm Near You" plays on the radio at Wendy's birthday party in the McCready's home.

== Release ==
=== Television ===
Superdad appeared on an episode of The Wonderful World of Disney on February 15, 1976.

=== Home media ===
This film was released by Walt Disney Home Video through VHS in September 1985. Superdad was also later released on DVD exclusively to members of the Disney Movie Club on June 1, 2008.

=== In other media ===
A poster for Superdad can be seen in a subway car in the original 1974 version of the film Death Wish.

Superdad was featured in the biographical film Auto Focus, in which Bob Crane (Greg Kinnear) hopes the film will revive his career following the end of the series Hogan's Heroes. A scene of Crane on water skis (re-shot with Kinnear) is accompanied by a voice-over revealing that Superdad was shelved for a year before flopping at the box office.

== Reception ==
Howard Thompson of The New York Times wrote: "The latest Disney feature, Superdad, is a typically scrubbed, bouncy exercise, in which an anxious, blundering father tries to separate his college-age daughter from her lively young cronies, only to have her mix with some weirdo hippies."

Norman Dresser of the Toledo Blade wrote: "Superdad must be ranked as the Disney people's most awful superdud."

== See also ==
- List of American films of 1973
