= Les Mayfield =

American film director and producer (born 1959)

- Born: November 30, 1959 (age 66); Albuquerque, New Mexico, U.S.
- Occupations: Film director, producer
- Years active: 1981–2007

Les Mayfield (born November 30, 1959) is an American retired film director and producer.

== Career ==
Shortly after graduating the USC School of Cinematic Arts, Les Mayfield formed the ZM Productions with schoolmate George Zaloom. Until its closure in 1998, the company had produced films and television programs such as Hearts of Darkness: A Filmmaker's Apocalypse, The Computer Wore Tennis Shoes, and The Cape in 16 years.

Mayfield made his feature-film debut in 1992 with the comedy Encino Man starring Pauly Shore and Brendan Fraser. It was followed by Miracle on 34th Street, starring Richard Attenborough, in 1994, and Flubber, starring Robin Williams, in 1997. He directed the Martin Lawrence comedy Blue Streak in 1999.

In the 2000s, Mayfield directed the Western American Outlaws starring Colin Farrell, and the comedies The Man, starring Samuel L. Jackson and Eugene Levy, in 2005 and Code Name: The Cleaner in 2007, starring Cedric the Entertainer.

== Filmography ==
- Encino Man (1992)
- Miracle on 34th Street (1994)
- Flubber (1997)
- Blue Streak (1999)
- American Outlaws (2001)
- The Man (2005)
- Code Name: The Cleaner (2007)
