= Miracle on 34th Street (1973 film) =

1973 television film directed by Fielder Cook

- Genre: Drama; Family; Fantasy
- Based on: The screenplay by George Seaton; From a story by Valentine Davies
- Written by: Jeb Rosebrook
- Directed by: Fielder Cook
- Starring: Sebastian Cabot; Jane Alexander; David Hartman; Jim Backus; Tom Bosley; David Doyle; James Gregory; Roland Winters; Roddy McDowall; Suzanne Davidson
- Theme music composer: Sid Ramin
- Opening theme: "Miracles"
- Country of origin: United States
- Original language: English

Production
- Producer: Norman Rosemont
- Cinematography: Earl Rath
- Editors: Gene Milford; Robert A. Daniels
- Running time: 100 minutes
- Production companies: Norman Rosemont Enterprises, Inc. 20th Television

Original release
- Network: CBS
- Release: December 14, 1973

Related
- Miracle on 34th Street (1994 film)

Miracle on 34th Street is a 1973 American made-for-television Christmas comedy-drama fantasy film directed by Fielder Cook. It is the third remake of the original 1947 film. Like the original, this film was produced by 20th Century Fox. Additionally, the New York City-based Macy's department store allowed their name to be used in this film, unlike the later version.

== Plot ==
When an old man spies the department store Santa Claus getting drunk before taking part in the Macy's Thanksgiving parade, he immediately complains to Karen Walker, the parade director. She fires her Santa, and the old man, who is named Kris Kringle, volunteers to take his place for the children's sake. Kris does so well that he is hired to be the store's main Santa for the holidays. At the same time, Karen's daughter, Susan, an intelligent but cynical six-year-old, meets her new neighbor, Bill Schafner, a lawyer, and decides to try and hook him up with her mother.

Kris, to the horror of Mr. Shellhammer, sends customers to other stores if they cannot find what they are looking for. The public embraces his actions as a goodwill marketing campaign and sales skyrocket, leading the profit-obsessed Mr. Macy to pursue the campaign. However, Karen and Shellhammer learn that Kris believes himself to actually be Santa, a fact they frantically try to hide from their boss.

The store's psychiatrist, Dr. Sawyer, initially takes Kris on as a fascinating case study, but Kris's belief that it is Sawyer who has the problem makes him an enemy. Kris finds a kindred spirit in the janitor, Alfred, who gets joy out of dressing as Santa at the local YMCA every year. He also learns that Susan has been raised to not believe in Santa Claus or possess an imagination, two things he intends to correct. Susan herself is further convinced of his authenticity because he has a real beard and speaks Spanish to a young girl who does not speak English.

Through their friendship with Kris, who becomes Bill's roommate, Bill becomes closer to Karen, who is overworked and looking for companionship, and Susan begins to learn the value of imagination. She eventually asks Kris to get her a new house for Christmas to prove that he is Santa, and later for help in ensuring Bill becomes her new father. Kris eventually passes the word on to Bill, who arranges for a real estate contract for Karen for a similar house and insists she buy the house for Susan's sake.

Sawyer antagonizes Kris to the point that Kris throws a pie in his face in the lunchroom. Reluctantly, Karen agrees to allow Sawyer to evaluate him again. After Kris helps Alfred with his yearly Santa Claus routine, Dr. Sawyer confronts him and lies to Kris and tells him that Karen believes him to be a menace. In light of this, Kris deliberately fails every one of his tests at Bellevue, leading to the hospital recommending his commitment.

Kris reveals to Bill that he intends for Bill to get him off, making Bill realize that Kris wants to prove to the world that he is Santa Claus. Bill agrees, and a commitment hearing begins. Judge Henry Harper and D.A. Thomas Mara reluctantly move forward despite the terrible press it is giving their political ambitions.

During the hearing, Mr. Macy is placed on the stand and, contemplating the bad publicity if he declared his own Santa a fraud, he says he believes in Kris and fires Sawyer. Similarly, Harper and Mara are eventually pressed to declare that Santa Claus is real, but the D.A. demands that Bill prove Kris is the one and only Santa Claus.

Bill and Karen are about to give up when Susan gives Bill a letter to pass on to Kris, and Bill realizes that hundreds of children write to Santa every year. He quickly manipulates the court to recognize the authority of the Postal Service, and arranges for the post office to deliver all of Santa's mail to the court. Harper dismisses the case in Kris's favor (and quietly slips a letter of his own into the pile).

At the celebration at the memorial home, Susan loses faith in Kris when she does not get her house. However, on the way back into New York, Bill and Karen drive past the house she asked for, leading Susan to rush inside and find it even has the swing she asked for. As Karen and Bill discover Kris's distinctive cane, they realize he made the arrangements and declare their love for each other.

== Cast ==
- Sebastian Cabot as Kris Kringle
- Jane Alexander as Karen Walker
- David Hartman as Bill Schaffner
- Roddy McDowall as Dr. Henry Sawyer
- Suzanne Davidson as Susan Walker
- Jim Backus as Horace Shellhammer
- Barry Greenberg as Alfred
- David Doyle as R.H. Macy
- Tom Bosley as Judge Henry X. Harper
- James Gregory as Deputy District Attorney Thomas J. Mara
- Roland Winters as Mr. Gimbel
- Liam Dunn as Mr. Tucker
- Conrad Janis as Dr. Pierce
- Ellen Weston as Celeste
- Jason Wingreen as Halloran
- Burt Mustin as Roy

== Production ==
Though Sebastian Cabot was known for having a beard at the time the film was made, he instead shaved it off and wore a false beard for this role due to the make-up artists failing at whitening his natural beard. Notably, the dialog in which Susan discovers his beard is real is still kept.

Natalie Wood, who played Susan in the original film, was originally offered the role of Karen Walker, with the idea that her real life daughter would play Susan and Robert Wagner, her husband at the time, would play Bill Schaffer. Wood declined due to concerns over her daughter being too young to start acting.

== Critical reception ==
In The New York Times, Howard Thompson wondered why a network would bother to remake a seasonal favourite like the original movie, but opined "it has matched the Hollywood film very nicely...Norman Rosemont's expansive production has real seasonal gleam." The reviewer praised a "winning cast," especially Sebastian Cabot: "charming," although "No Santa, of course, could match the gentle whimsey of the late Edmund Gwenn in the movie," concluding that "Two good “Miracles” should make the season merrier."

== See also ==
- Miracle on 34th Street (1947)
- Miracle on 34th Street (1994)
- List of Christmas films
