= Here's Love =

- Miracle on 34th Street the Musical
- Image of cast album CD cover
- Music: Meredith Willson
- Lyrics: Meredith Willson
- Book: Meredith Willson
- Basis: Miracle on 34th Street by George Seaton; Valentine Davies
- Productions: 1963 Broadway; 2007 Toronto

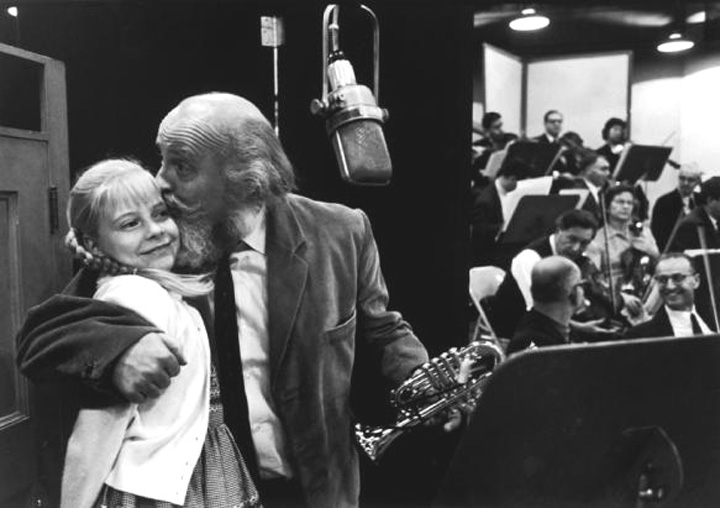
Kathy Cody and Laurence Naismith recording the cast album for Here's Love

Here's Love is a musical with a book, music, and lyrics by Meredith Willson. An adaptation of the film Miracle on 34th Street, the show is currently licensed under the film's name as Miracle on 34th Street: The Musical.

The musical, much like the film that inspired it, tells the tale of a skeptical young girl who doubts the existence of Santa Claus. When the real Kris Kringle is hired inadvertently to represent jolly St. Nick in the Macy's Thanksgiving Day Parade, he must convince the child and her cynical divorced mother (the department store's special events director) that he is the genuine article.

== Productions ==
The Broadway production, directed by Stuart Ostrow and choreographed by Michael Kidd, opened on October 3, 1963, at the Shubert Theatre, and closed on July 25, 1964, after 334 performances and 2 previews. The cast included Laurence Naismith, Janis Paige, Craig Stevens, Lisa Kirk, Fred Gwynne, Kathy Cody, Michael Bennett, and Baayork Lee. The original director, Norman Jewison, was replaced by Ostrow, the producer, during rehearsals.

Per: IBDB: Lead cast replacements included: Richard Kiley as Fred Gailey from May 26, 1964 - Jul 04, 1964; Lisa Kirk as Doris Walker from May 26, 1964 - Jul 25, 1964; John Payne as Fred Gailey from Jul 06, 1964 - Jul 25, 1964 (reprising his role from the original 1947 film).

This show had also been titled It's Beginning to Look a Lot Like Christmas and Miracle on 34th Street: The Musical. The song "It's Beginning to Look a Lot Like Christmas", written by Willson in 1951, is used in the musical, where it is sung in counterpoint to the newly-composed "Pine Cones and Holly Berries".

== Synopsis ==
Susan Walker and her mother, Doris, live alone in New York City in the 1960s. Doris works in an executive position at Macy's and, at the start of the musical, is busy organizing the Macy's Thanksgiving Day Parade. Susan meets an ex-marine named Fred Gaily, who takes it upon himself to rid her of her "realistic" outlook on life by taking her to see Santa Claus at Macy's. Kris (Santa) manages to win Susan over while love blooms between Fred and Doris. The second act sees Kris appearing in the New York Supreme Court, with Fred helping him defend his sanity. In the conclusion, Fred uses the Post Office to prove to the court (and the world) that Santa Claus does exist: Kris Kringle.

== Original Broadway cast and characters ==
- Valerie Lee – Susan Walker
- Janis Paige – Doris Walker
- Laurence Naismith – Kris Kringle\Santa Claus
- Craig Stevens – Fred Gaily
- Fred Gwynne – Marvin Shellhammer
- Paul Reed – R. H. Macy
- David Doyle - Mr. Sawyer
- Reby Howells - Miss Crookshank
- Kathy Cody – Hendrika

== First National Tour cast and characters (renamed: Miracle on 34th Street - The Musical) ==
- Charlotte Surak and Amelia Rue - Susan Walker
- Ellie Baker - Doris Walker
- Wesley Scott - Kris Kringle/Santa Claus
- Truman Griffin - Fred Gaily
- Liam Joshua Munn - Marvin Shellhammer
- Greg Kalafatas - R.H. Macy
- John Dellaporta - Mr. Sawyer
- Jocelyn Lonquist Klein - Miss Crookshank
- Beau Brians - Tammany O'Halloran
- Jerry Sciarrio - Judge Martin Group
- Charlotte Surak and Amelia Rue – Hendrika

== Song list ==
Broadway

Act I

- The Big Clown Balloons – Paradesters
- Arm in Arm – Doris Walker and Susan Walker
- You Don't Know – Doris Walker
- The Plastic Alligator – Marvin Shellhammer and Clerks
- The Bugle – Mr. Kris Kringle and Hendrika
- Here's Love – Mr. Kris Kringle, Fred Gaily, Customers, Clerks, Employees and Children
- My Wish – Fred Gaily and Susan Walker
- Pine Cones and Holly Berries/It's Beginning to Look a Lot Like Christmas – Mr. Kris Kringle, Doris Walker and Marvin Shellhammer
- Look, Little Girl – Fred Gaily
- Look, Little Girl (Reprise) – Doris Walker
- Expect Things to Happen – Mr. Kris Kringle

Act II

- Pine Cones and Holly Berries/It's Beginning to Look a Lot Like Christmas (Reprise) – Mr. Kris Kringle and Susan Walker
- She Hadda Go Back – Fred Gaily and Marines
- That Man Over There – R. H. Macy
- My State – Doris Walker, R. H. Macy, Marvin Shellhammer, Tammany O'Halloran and Judge Martin Group
- Nothing in Common – Doris Walker
- That Man Over There (Reprise) – Court Personnel and Spectators
