= Orson Bean =

American actor (1928–2020)

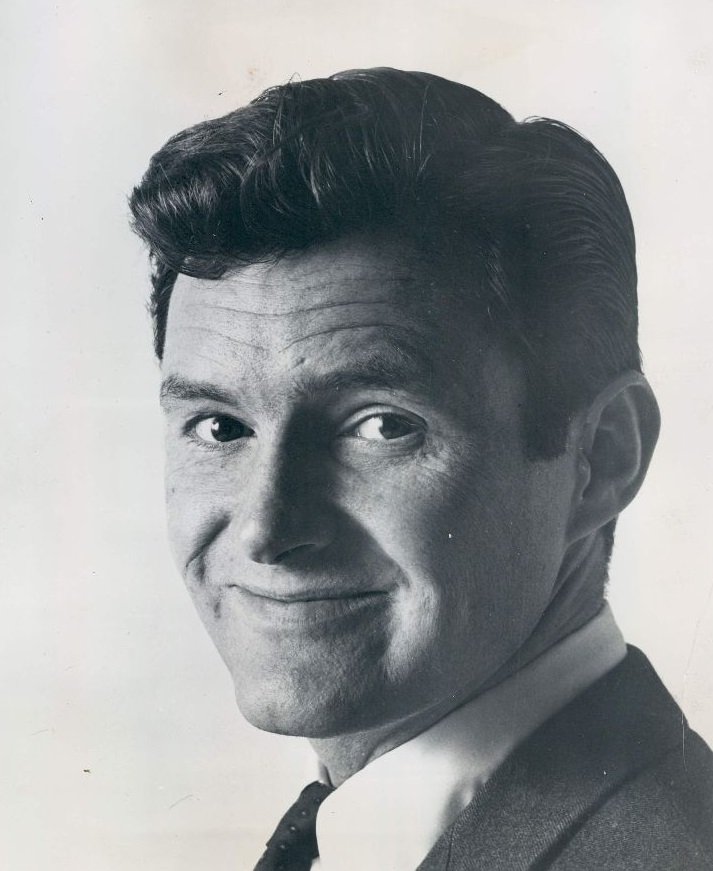
- Bean in 1965
- Born: Dallas Frederick Burrows; July 22, 1928; Burlington, Vermont, U.S.
- Died: February 7, 2020 (aged 91); Los Angeles, California, U.S.
- Occupations: Actor; comedian; producer; writer
- Years active: 1952–2020
- Spouses: Jacqueline de Sibour (m. 1956; div. 1962) Carolyn Maxwell (m. 1965; div. 1981) Alley Mills (m. 1993)
- Children: 4

Orson Bean (born Dallas Frederick Burrows; July 22, 1928 – February 7, 2020) was an American film, television, and stage actor and comedian and a "mainstay of Los Angeles’ small theater scene." He appeared frequently on several televised game shows from the 1960s through the 1980s and was a longtime panelist on the television game show To Tell the Truth. "A storyteller par excellence", he was a favorite of Johnny Carson, appearing on The Tonight Show more than 200 times.

In the 1960s, Bean remarked in an interview that he became known as a "neocelebrity who's famous for being famous" for his appearances as a panellist on television prime-time gameshows.

== Early life ==
Bean was born in Burlington, Vermont on July 22, 1928. At the time of his birth, his first cousin twice removed, Calvin Coolidge, was President of the United States. Bean was the son of Marian Ainsworth (née Pollard) and George Frederick Burrows. His father was a founding member of the American Civil Liberties Union (ACLU), a fund-raiser for the Scottsboro Boys' defense, and a 20-year member of the campus police of Harvard College. Bean said his home was "full of causes". He left home at 16 after his mother died by suicide.

Bean graduated from Cambridge High and Latin School in Cambridge, Massachusetts in 1946. He then joined the United States Army and was stationed in Japan for a year. Following his military service, Bean began working in small venues as a stage magician before moving in the early 1950s to stand-up comedy. He studied theatre at HB Studio.

== Stage name ==
In an interview on The Tonight Show Starring Johnny Carson in 1974, Bean recounted the source of his stage name. He credited its origin to a piano player named Val at "Hurley's Log Cabin", a restaurant and nightclub in Boston where he had once performed. According to Bean, every evening before he went on stage at the nightclub Val would suggest to him a silly name to use when introducing himself to the audience. One night, for example, the piano player suggested "Roger Duck," but the young comedian got very few laughs after using that name in his performance. On another night, the musician suggested "Orson Bean" and the comedian received a great response from the audience, a reaction so favorable that it resulted in a job offer that same evening from a local theatrical booking agent. Given his success on that occasion, Bean decided to keep using the odd-sounding but memorable name. (Bean again told the story nearly verbatim on the Carson show September 23, 1976, but Carson appeared to not remember having heard it before.)

Bean claimed that his name was a blend of the pompous and the amusing. He recalled that Orson Welles once called him over to a table and said, "You stole my name," and then dismissed him with a wave.

== Rising comedian ==
In 1952, Bean received his first national exposure when NBC Radio revived its hot-jazz series The Chamber Music Society of Lower Basin Street. This burlesque of stuffy symphonic and operatic broadcasts featured dixieland jam sessions, with the host (always introduced as a doctor of music) reciting dignified commentary in jazz-musician slang. NBC had broadcast the series off and on since 1940, and it was revived for a 13-week run with "Dr. Orson Bean" as host. Bean's august, bemused delivery belied the fact that this eminent professor was only 23 years old. Bean also hosted a Lower Basin Street half-hour TV special, which aired on Sunday, June 15, 1952 at 5:30 p.m.

For 10 years, he was the house comic at New York's Blue Angel comedy club. In 1954, The New York Times noted in a review of The Blue Angel, Bean's delivery was always well played, even if a joke fell flat. In the summer of 1954, he hosted a television show, The Blue Angel, on CBS in which he served as emcee, introducing various acts at the simulated nightclub. Time Magazine, reviewing the show, called Bean "a quiet, wry, young comedian ... who has a happy way with a joke". He "maintained a steady career since the 1950s and cut his teeth on and off Broadway before becoming a live-television staple."

== Blacklisting ==
Bean was placed on the Hollywood blacklist for attending Communist Party meetings while dating a member but continued to work through the 1950s and 1960s. "Basically I was blacklisted because I had a cute communist girlfriend," he said in a 2001 interview. He only stopped working in television for a year. An appearance on The Ed Sullivan Show was canceled due to his blacklisting, and he was rendered persona non grata there for years because of it. Sullivan eventually relented and re-booked him, declaring that he was the master of his own show, not "Campbell's Soup." (Per the Los Angeles Times, Sullivan noted that "'it was Campbell Soup that did the blacklisting, not CBS.'")

== Theater ==
On Broadway Bean starred in the original cast of Will Success Spoil Rock Hunter? with Walter Matthau and Jayne Mansfield. Then, in 1961, he was featured in Subways Are for Sleeping with Sydney Chaplin, for which he was nominated for a Best Featured Actor in a Musical. Bean performed in Never Too Late the following year. In 1964, he produced the Off-Off-Broadway musical Home Movies — which won an Obie Award. And the same year, he appeared in the Broadway production I Was Dancing. Bean starred in the musical revue John Murray Anderson’s Almanac. He also voiced and sang the role of Charlie Brown on MGM's original 1966 concept album of the musical You're a Good Man, Charlie Brown, and starred in Illya Darling, the 1967 musical adaptation of the film Never on Sunday.

He was a chief creator and "mainstay" of The Pacific Resident Theatre in Venice, California.

== Television ==
Bean played the title character in the Twilight Zone episode "Mr. Bevis" (1960) that was an unsuccessful television pilot. For the CBS anthology series The DuPont Show with June Allyson, he starred as John Monroe in "The Country Mouse" (1961), based on the works of the American humorist James Thurber, an episode which was later developed into the series My World and Welcome to It on NBC, starring William Windom in the Monroe role.

Among dozens of appearances, Bean starred in Dr. Quinn, Medicine Woman and Desperate Housewives while tallying guest appearance credits on programs such as How I Met Your Mother, Modern Family, Two and a Half Men, and The Closer. Bean was a regular in both Mary Hartman, Mary Hartman and its spin-off Fernwood 2Nite. He also portrayed the shrewd businessman and storekeeper Loren Bray on the television series Dr. Quinn, Medicine Woman throughout its six-year run on CBS in the 1990s. Bean voiced the main characters Bilbo and Frodo Baggins in the 1977 and 1980 Rankin/Bass animated adaptations of J.R.R. Tolkien's The Hobbit, and The Return of the King. In 2000, he appeared in the Will & Grace episode "There But For the Grace of Grace" as Will Truman and Grace Adler's old college professor. He also appeared in the short-lived Fox sitcom Normal, Ohio as the homophobic father of a gay man (played by John Goodman).

Bean appeared as a patient in the final two episodes of 7th Heaven's seventh season in 2003. In 2005, Bean appeared in the sitcom Two and a Half Men in an episode titled "Does This Smell Funny to You?", playing a former playboy whose conquests included actresses Tuesday Weld and Anne Francis. He appeared in the 2007 How I Met Your Mother episode "Slapsgiving" as Robin Scherbatsky's 41-year-old boyfriend, Bob. In 2009 he was cast in the recurring role of Roy Bender, a steak salesman, who is Karen McCluskey's love interest on the ABC series Desperate Housewives. At the age of 87, Bean in 2016 appeared in "Playdates", an episode of the American TV sitcom Modern Family. He appeared in a 2017 episode of Teachers (TV Land, season 2, episode 11, "Dosey Don't"). He appeared at the age of 89 as a doctor in the Superstore episode "Delivery Day" in 2019. In 2020, Bean appeared in the Netflix series Grace and Frankie, as the rascally character Bruno, a potential green card spouse for Joan-Margaret, in the episode "The Scent" (S6E10). It was Bean's final television performance.

=== Game shows ===
Doing stand-up comedy and magic tricks, Bean became a regular on I've Got a Secret, What's My Line?, and To Tell the Truth. He appeared on game shows originating from New York. He was a regular panelist on To Tell the Truth in versions from the late 1950s through 1991. Bean appeared on Super Password and Match Game, among other game shows. He hosted a pilot for a revamped version of Concentration in 1985; it was not picked up, but elements carried over to Classic Concentration with Alex Trebek, primarily the theme, graphics and announcer Gene Wood.

=== Talk and variety shows ===
A skilled raconteur, Bean was a popular guest on various television talk and variety shows, including The Ed Sullivan Show, The Mike Douglas Show, and The Tonight Show (with both Jack Paar and Johnny Carson), where he made frequent appearances.

== Film ==
Bean played the eccentric, foul-mouthed Dr. Lester in Spike Jonze's 1999 film, Being John Malkovich. He also appeared as a Holocaust survivor in the 2018 film The Equalizer 2 and as Meg Ryan's editor in Joe Dante's 1987 film Innerspace.

== Personal life ==
Bean was married three times. His first marriage was in 1956 to actress Jacqueline de Sibour, whose stage name was Rain Winslow. Sibour was the daughter of French nobleman and pilot Vicomte Jacques de Sibour and his wife Violette B. Selfridge (daughter of American-born British department-store magnate Harry Gordon Selfridge). Before their divorce in 1962, Bean and Jacqueline had one child, Michele.

In 1965, he married actress and fashion designer Carolyn Maxwell, with whom he had three children: Max, Susannah, and Ezekiel. The couple divorced in 1981. Their daughter Susannah was married to journalist Andrew Breitbart from 1997 until his death in 2012. In the early 1970s Bean took his family on a sabbatical break from New York to live briefly (for about three months) on a farm commune in Victoria, Australia.

Bean's third wife was The Wonder Years co-star Alley Mills. They married in 1993 and lived in Los Angeles until his death in 2020. When Mills was baptized as an adult, Bean walked with her down to the beach so "Pastor Ken" from First Lutheran Church of Venice could baptize her in the waters of the Pacific Ocean. For many years, Bean and Mills played roles in First Lutheran's annual production of A Christmas Carol; Bean played Ebenezer Scrooge.

An admirer of Laurel and Hardy, Bean, in 1965, was a founding member of The Sons of the Desert. This international organization is devoted to sharing information about the lives of Stan Laurel and Oliver Hardy and preserving and enjoying their films.

In 1966, he helped found the 15th Street School in New York City, a primary school using the radical, democratic, free school Summerhill as a model. Bean wrote an autobiographical account about his life-changing experience with the orgone therapy developed by Austrian-born psychoanalyst Wilhelm Reich. Published in 1971, the account is titled Me and the Orgone: The True Story of One Man's Sexual Awakening.

He was a distant cousin of President Calvin Coolidge. In later life, "his politics turned more conservative" and he authored intermittent columns for Breitbart News. He ventured the thought that being a conservative in 21st-century Hollywood was much like being a suspected Communist back in the 1950s.

For much of his career and until his death, he was represented by the Artists & Representatives agency. In its brief statement after his death, they noted he was an "assiduous nurturer of rising talent".

== Death ==
On February 7, 2020, while crossing Venice Boulevard in the Venice section of Los Angeles, Bean died from complications of a pedestrian accident. He was struck by two vehicles, with the second striking him fatally. The driver of the first vehicle "did not see [Bean] and clipped him and he went down", said Los Angeles Police Department Captain Brian Wendling. "A second vehicle's driver was distracted by people trying to slow him down; when the driver looked ahead, a second traffic collision occurred and it caused the death of Bean."

== Filmography ==
=== Film ===
Year	Film	Role	Notes
1955	How to Be Very, Very Popular	Toby Marshall	
1959	Anatomy of a Murder	Dr. Matthew Smith	
1970	Twinky	Hal	
1971	You've Got To Walk It Like You Talk It Or You'll Lose That Beat	Himself	
1977	The Hobbit	Bilbo	
1978	Skateboard	Himself	
1982	Forty Deuce	Mr. Roper	
1987	Innerspace	Lydia's Editor	
1990	Instant Karma	Dr. Berlin	
1999	Being John Malkovich	Dr. Lester	
1999	Unbowed	Purdy	
2001	Burning Down the House	Sy	
2001	The Gristle	Mr. Bowen	
2002	Frank McKlusky, C.I.	Mr Gafty	
2004	Soccer Dog: European Cup	Mayor Milton Gallagher	
2004	Cacophony	Ferruccio	short
2006	Alien Autopsy	Homeless Man	
2007	Mattie Fresno and the Holoflux Universe	Raff Buddemeyer	
2007	Oranges	Dennis	
2018	The Equalizer 2	Sam Rubinstein	

=== Television ===
Year	Title	Role	Notes
1952	Goodyear Television Playhouse	Performer	Episode: Three Letters
1952	Broadway Television Theatre	Various	2 episodes
1952-1956	Westinghouse Studio One	Various	3 episodes
1954	Robert Montgomery Presents	Performer	Episode: "It Happened in Paris"
1954–1963	The United States Steel Hour	Various Roles	3 episodes
1955	The Best of Broadway	Mortimer Brewster	Episode: "Arsenic and Old Lace"
1955	The Elgin Hour	Arthur	Episode: "San Francisco Fracas"
1956	Omnibus	Narrator	2 episodes
1957	Kraft Television Theatre	George Sanford	Episode: "A Travel from Brussels"
1957	Playhouse 90	Jack Chesney	Episode: "Charley's Aunt"
1958	The Phil Silvers Show	Pvt. Wally Gunther	Episode: "Bilko's Insurance Company"
1958	The Millionaire	Newman Johnson	Episode: "The Newman Johnson Story"
1959	Miracle on 34th Street	Dr. William Sawyer	Television Movie
1960	The Twilight Zone	James B.W. Bevis	Episode: "Mr. Bevis"
1960	Once Around the Block	Jimmy London	The Play of the Week
1961	The DuPont Show with June Allyson	John Monroe	Episode: "The Secret Life of James Turber"
1962	Naked City	Arnold Platt	Episode: "To Walk Like a Lion"
1964	Vacation Playhouse	Performer	Episode: "The Bean Show"
1966	The Star-Wagon	Stephen Minch	Television Movie
1966–1970	NET Playhouse	Multiple Roles	2 episodes
1970	A Connecticut Yankee in King Arthur's Court	Hank / Sir Boss	Voice, TV movie
1970	Love, American Style	Artie Kaufman	Segment: "Love and the Teacher"
1975	Ellery Queen	Warren Wright	Episode: "The Adventure of the Chinese Dog"
1977	Forever Fernwood	Reverend Brim	Television Series
1977	The Hobbit	Bilbo Baggins	Voice, TV movie
1978	Mary Hartman, Mary Hartman	Reverend Brim	Unknown episodes 1977–1978
1978	The Love Boat	Artie D' Angelo	Episode: "Heads or Tails/Little People, The/Mona of the Movies"
1980	The Return of the King	Frodo Baggins / Bilbo Baggins	Television Movie
1982	One Life to Live	Harrison Logan	1 episode
1984	Garfield in the Rough	Billy Rabbit	Television Short
1984	The Fall Guy	Jason Klemer	Episode: October 31
1985	Super Password	Himself	Game Show Contestant / Celebrity Guest Star
1986–1987	The Facts of Life	Oliver Thompson	3 episodes
1986–1989	Murder, She Wrote	Ebeneezer McEnery	2 episodes
1990	Tiny Toon Adventures	Gepetto	Voice, Episode: "Fairy Tales for the 90's"
1991	Chance of a Lifetime	Fred	Television Movie
1992	Final Judgement	Monsignor Corelli	Made for Video
1992	Just My Imagination	Jeremy Stitcher	TV movie
1993–1998	Dr. Quinn, Medicine Woman	Loren Bray	146 episodes
1997	California	Loren Bray	Unknown episodes
1998	Diagnosis: Murder	Lewis Sweeney	Episode: "Obsession: Part 1"
1999	Thanks	Burnaby Fitzhugh	Episode: "Spring"
2000	Manhattan, AZ	Lew Goldberg	2 episodes
2000	Ally McBeal	Marty	Episode: "In Search of Pygmies"
2000	The King of Queens	Carl Tepper	Episode: "Surprise Artie"
2000	Family Law	Archbishop Phillips	Episode: "Possession Is Nine Tenths of the Law"
2000	Will & Grace	Professor Joseph Dudley	Episode: "There But for the Grace of Grace"
2000	Normal, Ohio	William 'Bill' Gamble, Sr.	7 episodes
2002	Becker	Mr. Bennet	Episode: "Piece Talks"
2003	7th Heaven	Various	2 episodes
2004	Behind the Camera	John Forsythe	Voice, TV movie
2004	Cold Case	Harland Sealey	Episode: "Red Glare"
2005	Two and a Half Men	Norman	Episode: "Does This Smell Funny to You?"
2006	Commander in Chief	Bill Harrison	Episode: "The Price You Pay"
2007	The Closer	Donald Baxter	Episode: "The Round File"
2007	The Minor Accomplishments of Jackie Woodman	Chick	Episode: "Good Times and Great Oldies"
2007	Women's Murder Club	Harold Grant	Episode: "Grannies, Guns and Love Mints"
2007	How I Met Your Mother	Bob	Episode: "Slapsgiving"
2009	Safe Harbor	Judge	TV movie
2009–2012	Desperate Housewives	Roy Bender	Recurring role, 23 episodes
2011	Hot in Cleveland	Dan	Episode: "Funeral Crashers"
2012	A Golden Christmas 3	Mr. Cole	Television Movie
2014	Mistresses	Elderly Patient	Episode: "Rebuild"
2016	Modern Family	Marty	Episode: "Playdates"
2016	The Guest Book	Edgar	Episode: "Story Eight"
2016	The Bold and the Beautiful	Howard	2 episodes
2016	Another Period	Laverne Fusselforth V	2 episodes
2017	Teachers	Jerry	Episode: "Dosey Don't"
2018	Superstore	Dr. Fogler	Episode: "Delivery Day"
2020	Grace and Frankie	Bruno	Episode: "The Scent"

== Awards and nominations ==
Year	Award	Category	Nominated work	Result	Ref.
1978	Grammy Awards	Best Recording for Children	The Hobbit	Nominated	
1999	Screen Actors Guild Awards	Outstanding Performance by a Cast in a Motion Picture	Being John Malkovich	Nominated	
1954	Theatre World Awards	—N/a	John Murray Anderson's Almanac	Won	
1962	Tony Awards	Best Supporting or Featured Actor in a Musical	Subways Are for Sleeping	Nominated	

== Books ==
- Me and the Orgone. Princeton, N.J: American College of Orgonomy Press. 1972. ISBN 0-9679670-1-5.
- Too Much Is Not Enough. Secaucus, N.J: L. Stuart. 1988. ISBN 0-8184-0465-5.
- 25 Ways to Cook a Mouse for the Gourmet Cat (Print). Secaucus, N.J: Carol Publishing Group. 1994. ISBN 1-55972-199-5.
- M@il for Mikey: an odd sort of recovery memoir (Hardcover) (1st ed.). Fort Lee, New Jersey: Barricade Books. September 3, 2008. ISBN 978-1569803509.

== Recordings ==
- At the Hungry i (1959 Fantasy UFAN 7009), comedy
- You're A Good Man, Charlie Brown (as Charlie Brown, 1966), comedy
- I Ate the Baloney (1969 Columbia CS 9743), comedy
