= Miracle on 34th Street (NBC Friday Night Special Presentation) =

- NBC Friday Night Special Presentation episode
- Newspaper advertisement
- Episode no.: Season 1 Episode 9
- Directed by: William Corrigan
- Written by: Teleplay by Harry Muheim; Based on the screenplay by George Seaton; From the story by Valentine Davies
- Original air date: November 27, 1959
- Running time: 60 minutes

Guest appearances
- Ed Wynn; Peter Lind Hayes; Mary Healy; Orson Bean

Episode chronology
← Previous "All-Gershwin Program"	Next → "Art Carney Show"

"Miracle on 34th Street" is the Christmas episode, broadcast on November 27, 1959, of the American color anthology television series NBC Friday Night Special Presentation, which showcased drama, comedy and musical entertainment and occasional news special reports, while alternating once a month with The Bell Telephone Hour musical series, also in color, in the 8:30–9:30 pm time slot from September 11, 1959, until June 17, 1960.

== Plot ==
The story takes place between Thanksgiving Day and Christmas Day in New York City, and focuses on the impact of a department store Santa Claus who claims to be the real Santa.

== Cast ==
- Ed Wynn as Kris Kringle
- Peter Lind Hayes as Fred Gaily
- Mary Healy as Doris Walker
- Orson Bean as Dr. William Sawyer
- Loring Smith as Mr. Shellhammer
- Hiram Sherman as R. H. Macy
- Susan Gordon as Susan Walker
- Lawrence Weber as Mr. Mara
- John Gibson as Judge Harper
- Joey Walsh as Al, post office employee
- Arnie Freeman as Lou, post office employee
- William Post, Jr. as Mr. Gimbel
- Shirley Eggleston as Peter's mother
- Frank Daly as the bailiff
- William Griffis as first Santa Claus

== Production ==
=== Casting ===
The episode stars Ed Wynn, a recent Golden Globe Award for Best Supporting Actor – Motion Picture nominee for 1956's The Great Man and soon-to-be Academy Award for Best Supporting Actor nominee for that year's production of The Diary of Anne Frank. Co-starring with Wynn were married actors Peter Lind Hayes and Mary Healy.

Also in the cast, playing the befuddled psychiatrist, was Orson Bean, a regular, at the time, on the quiz show Keep Talking, and child actress Susan Gordon who, earlier that year, had worked on episodes of two other live TV series, Playhouse 90 and Goodyear Theatre, as well as in two theatrical films, The Man in the Net and The Five Pennies.

=== Broadcast ===
Presented the Friday after Thankgiving, the live broadcast was directed by William Corrigan.

== Recording ==
The broadcast was long believed to have no surviving copies, but a kinescope was discovered at the Library of Congress where it was shown in December 2005. Susan Gordon who played Mary Healy's daughter and was ten at the time of the broadcast, attended the screening.
