= The Miracle on 34th Street (The 20th Century Fox Hour) =

- The 20th Century Fox Hour episode
- Episode no.: Season 1 Episode 6
- Directed by: Robert Stevenson
- Written by: Teleplay by John Monks, Jr.; Based on the screenplay by George Seaton; From the story by Valentine Davies
- Cinematography by: Lloyd Ahern, A.S.C.
- Production code: 006
- Original air date: December 14, 1955

Guest appearances
- Macdonald Carey; Teresa Wright; Thomas Mitchell as Kris Kringle

Episode chronology
← Previous "Christopher Bean"	Next → "Man on the Ledge"

"The Miracle on 34th Street" is the Christmas episode of the American anthology television series The 20th Century Fox Hour. Broadcast on December 14, 1955, it was directed by Robert Stevenson, with stars Macdonald Carey, Teresa Wright and Thomas Mitchell as Kris Kringle. One reviewer claimed this version was an improvement over the original movie, stating "shortening the tale has made it brighter and less saccharine."

== Cast ==
- Macdonald Carey as Fred Gaily
- Teresa Wright as Doris Walker
- Thomas Mitchell as Kris Kringle
- Sandy Descher as Susan Walker
- Hans Conried as Mr. Shellhammer
- Ray Collins as Judge Harper
- Dick Foran as Thomas Mara
- John Abbott as Dr. Sawyer
- Don Beddoe as Mr. Macy
- Whit Bissell as Dr. Pierce
- Sara Berner as Woman Shopper
- Herbert Vigran as Postal Clerk
- Maudie Prickett as Miss Prossy
- Paul Smith as Store Clerk
- Herbert Hayes as Mr. Gimbel
- Louis Towers as Peter
- Earl Robie as Tommy Mara, Jr.
