= Valentine Davies =

Film director, screenwriter (1905–1961)

- Born: Valentine Loewi Davies; August 25, 1905; New York City, US
- Died: July 23, 1961 (aged 55); Malibu, California, US
- Education: University of Michigan
- Occupations: Screenwriter, playwright, director, producer
- Writing career
- Notable works: Miracle on 34th Street; The Benny Goodman Story; The Bridges at Toko-Ri; It Happens Every Spring
- Notable awards: Best Story; 1947 Miracle on 34th Street

Valentine Loewi Davies (August 25, 1905 – July 23, 1961) was an American film and television writer, producer, and director. His film credits included Miracle on 34th Street (1947), Chicken Every Sunday (1949), It Happens Every Spring (1949), The Bridges at Toko-Ri (1954), and The Benny Goodman Story (1955). He won the 1947 Academy Award for Best Story for Miracle on 34th Street and was nominated for the 1954 Academy Award for Best Original Screenplay for The Glenn Miller Story.

== Early life ==
Davies was born in New York City in 1905; his father worked in real estate. Davies attended the University of Michigan starting in 1923, and wrote reviews for The Michigan Daily, the school newspaper. While at UM, he met Elizabeth Straus, and married her soon after he graduated in 1926. They became the parents of son John and daughter Judith. He later obtained a graduate degree at Yale Drama School.

== Career ==
In 1925, while a college student, Davies wrote the book and lyrics for a musical entitled Tambourine. He later wrote three Broadway plays: Three Times the Hour (opened August 25, 1931), Keeper of the Keys (opened October 18, 1933), and Blow Ye Winds (opened September 23, 1937).

Davis moved to California and began writing film screenplays. He served in the United States Coast Guard during World War II, and around Christmas 1943 he wrote the story for what would become the 1947 film Miracle on 34th Street, which earned him an Academy Award for Best Story.

From 1949 to 1950, he served as President of the Screen Writers Guild and was on the Board of Governors from 1955 to 1961. The Valentine Davies Award was established by the Writers Guild of America, West, which is given to Guild members whose work brought honor and dignity to all writers.

== Death ==
Davies died at his home in Malibu, California on July 23, 1961, when he was fifty-five years old. The cause of death was a heart attack "brought on by a deep bellied-laugh".

== Screenwriting filmography ==
Davis wrote the screenplays for:

- Syncopation 1942
- Three Little Girls in Blue 1946
- Miracle on 34th Street 1947 (won Academy Award for Best Story)
- You Were Meant for Me 1948
- Chicken Every Sunday 1949
- It Happens Every Spring 1949
- On the Riviera 1951
- Sailor of the King 1953
- The Glenn Miller Story 1954 (nominated for Academy Award for Best Story)
- The Bridges at Toko-Ri 1954
- Strategic Air Command 1955
- The Benny Goodman Story 1956

Non-profit organization positions
Preceded by B. B. Kahane	President of Academy of Motion Pictures, Arts and Sciences; 1960-1961	Succeeded by Wendell Corey
