= Purple House Press =

Publishing company

- Founded: 2000
- Founder: Jill Morgan
- Country of origin: United States
- Headquarters location: North Carolina
- Publication types: Books
- Fiction genres: children's books
- Official website: purplehousepress.com

Purple House Press is a publishing house based in North Carolina. Founded in 2000 by former software engineer Jill Morgan, it specializes in bringing out-of-print children's books back into print.

In the mid-1990s, Morgan purchased a copy of her own favorite kids' book, Mr. Pine's Purple House, for $1. She was later shocked to discover that it, and similar books, were selling for hundreds of dollars online. Not wanting these books to die out because parents would be afraid to let their kids touch them, she took steps to make them readily available again. As of 2022, Purple House has more than 150 books in print, many from award-winning authors and illustrators.

Its catalog also contains books such as The Mad Scientists' Club series by Bertrand R. Brinley, Pickle-Chiffon Pie and more by Jolly Roger Bradfield,Tal: His Marvelous Adventures with Noom-Zor-Noom, by Paul Fenimore Cooper, and Mr. Bear Squash-You-All-Flat, by Morrell Gipson.

== Selected authors and titles published ==
- Roger Bradfield, (1924–2022) — American children's book author, illustrator, cartoonist and painter.
- Bertrand R. Brinley, (1917–1994) — American writer of short stories and children's tales, including The Mad Scientists' Club series and The Big Chunk of Ice.
- Tal: His Marvelous Adventures with Noom-Zor-Noom by Paul Fenimore Cooper.
- Wende and Harry Devlin, the Cranberryport series and Old Witch series.
- Clifford B. Hicks, (1920–2010) — several books from the Alvin Fernald series.
- Elizabeth Orton Jones, (1910–2005) writer of Twig (novel) and Big Susan.
- Leonard Kessler, (1921–2022) author of Mr. Pine's Purple House, Mr. Pine's Mixed Up Signs, Mrs. Pine Takes a Trip and Stan the Hot Dog Man.
- David and the Phoenix by Edward Ormondroyd.
- Kate Seredy, (1899–1975) — Hungarian-born writer and illustrator of children's books.
- The Blueberry Pie Elf by Jane Thayer.
- Miss Suzy by Miriam Young, illustrated by Arnold Lobel.
