= Twig (disambiguation) =

A twig is a small thin terminal branch of a woody plant.

Twig, TWiG, or twigs may also refer to:

== In sports ==
- Ice hockey stick, what players use in ice hockey to propel the puck.

== In computing ==
- Twig (template engine), an open source template engine for PHP

== In the arts ==
- FKA Twigs, an English singer, songwriter, record producer, director, and dancer
- Twig (novel), a 1942 book by Elizabeth Orton Jones
- Twigs (play), a play by George Furth

== Other uses ==
- This Week in Google, technology netcast
- Twig, Minnesota, an unincorporated community in Saint Louis County, Minnesota, United States

== See also ==
- Teeth cleaning twig
- Twiggy (disambiguation)
