= Big Susan =

1947 children's fantasy story by Elizabeth Orton Jones

- First edition
- Author: Elizabeth Orton Jones
- Illustrator: Elizabeth Orton Jones
- Cover artist: Jones
- Language: English
- Genre: Children's fantasy, Picture books
- Published: 1947
- Publisher: Macmillan, Purple House Press
- Publication place: United States
- ISBN: 1-930900-06-6 (Anniversary edition)

Big Susan is a 1947 children's fantasy story by American author and illustrator Elizabeth Orton Jones. It is generally considered a Christmas story, reflecting the author's love of the holiday season. (She was born on June 25, or, according to her, half past Christmas.)

The plot deals with the Doll family, a family of dolls that belong to Susan, or Big Susan as they call her, for she is more than double their size. One night a year (Christmas) they come to life, and a fantastical story of Christmas miracles begins.

The novel, along with Twig, is one of Jones' most popular books. It was out of print for a few years, until the recent 55th anniversary edition came out, in 2002.

== Publication details ==
- Purple House Press; 1st edition (September 2002), ISBN 1-930900-06-6
