= Mehitable =

- Gender: Feminine
- Language: English

Origin
- Origin: Biblical Hebrew
- Meaning: "God rejoices"

Other names
- Nicknames: Hitty, Mabel
- Related names: Mehetabel, Mehitabel

Mehitable is a feminine given name, a variant of the Old Testament name Mehetabel (meaning "God benefits"). During the British colonial period, it was a name used in the New England colonies, as the Protestants took many of their children's names from the Old Testament.

== People ==
- Mehitable Rowley, daughter-in-law to Samuel Fuller whose father, Edward Fuller was a Mayflower Pilgrim and signatory of the Mayflower Compact.
- Mehitable E. Woods (1813–1891), heroine of the American Civil War

== Other uses ==
- "Mehitable Lamb", a short story by Mary Wilkins Freeman about a girl by this name.
- The alley cat "Mehitabel" of Don Marquis's fictional writings, Archy and Mehitabel.
- A doll named Mehitabel (Hitty) in Hitty, Her First Hundred Years (1930), the Newbery Medal-winning children's novel written by Rachel Field.
- A historical character named "Mehitabel Freeman" in the Mary Higgins Clark book Remember Me.
