= Charles Geer =

American illustrator and children's writer

Charles Hand Geer (August 25, 1922 – December 7, 2008) was an American illustrator, painter and author. He illustrated numerous books, mainly for children and young adults, and created a wide variety of cover paintings for books in many genres.

Geer grew up on Long Island, New York, attended Dartmouth College in New Hampshire, and then served in the United States Navy during World War II. Following the war he attended art school at the Pratt Institute.

Many of the buildings in his illustrations and covers featured Second Empire architecture, with their characteristic mansard roofs.

Geer lived in Rockland, Maine, until his death in 2008, where he enjoyed sailing and painting watercolors. Over the years, he built several boats.

== Selected works ==
=== As illustrator ===
- Game of Statues by Anne Stevenson
- Schoolboy Johnson by John R. Tunis
- Mystery at Redtop Hill, by Marjory Schwalje, 1965
- The Mad Scientists' Club, by Bertrand R. Brinley
- The New Adventures of the Mad Scientists' Club, by Bertrand R. Brinley
- The Big Kerplop, by Bertrand R. Brinley
- The Big Chunk of Ice, by Bertrand R. Brinley
- The Marvelous Inventions of Alvin Fernald, by Clifford B. Hicks
- Miss Pickerell on the Moon, by Dora F. Pantell
- Miss Pickerell and the Weather Satellite, by Ellen MacGregor and Dora F. Pantell, 1971
- Miss Pickerell and the Blue Whales, by Dora F. Pantell
- Miss Pickerell and the War of the Computers, by Dora F. Pantell
- Miss Pickerell and the Lost World, by Dora F. Pantell
- Wild Geese Flying, by Cornelia Meigs
- That Summer With Lexy!, by Audrey McKim
- McNulty's Holiday, by Rutherford Montgomery
- Sauncey and Mr. King's Gallery, by Clara Ann Simmons
- The Biggest (and Best) Flag That Ever Flew, by Rebecca C. Jones, 1988
- The Story of Dwight D. Eisenhower, by Arthur J. Beckhard, 1956
- The Lost Dragon of Wessex by Gwendolyn Bowers, 1957
- Katie Kittenheart by Miriam E. Mason. Macmillan, 1957.
- Lost in the Barrens by Farley Mowat
- The Pipe Organ in the Parlour, by Lilla Stirling, 1960
- Sandro's Battle, by David Scott Daniell, 1962 (jacket only)
- Oregon at Last!, by Anna Rutgers van der Loeff, 1962
- First There Was Adam by Harriet Lawrence, 1965
- Secret Under Antarctica, by Gordon R. Dickson
- The Secret Raft, by Hazel Krantz
- Plain Girl, by Virginia Sorensen
- Gretchen of Grand Pré, by Lilla Stirling
- "The Lonely Mound," by William Campbell Gault (cover illustrator)

=== As author ===
- Dexter and the Deer Lake Mystery (1965)
- Soot Devil (1971)
- The Pipe Organ in the Parlour (also by Lilla Stirling, 1960)
