= Calico Bush (novel) =

1931 novel by Rachel Field

- Calico Bush original cover by Allen Lewis
- Author: Rachel Field
- Illustrator: Allen Lewis
- Genre: Children's literature / Historical fiction
- Publisher: Macmillan (hardback) / Aladdin (paperback)
- Publication date: 1931
- Pages: 225
- ISBN: 9780689822858

Calico Bush is a 1931 children's historical novel written by Rachel Field and illustrated by Allen Lewis. It is set on the Maine coast from the summer of 1743 through the spring of 1744, and tells the story of Marguerite, a young French orphan who becomes an indentured servant on a farm. The book received a Newbery Honor award in 1932.

== Background ==
Field spent the 1920s summering on Sutton Island, part of Cranberry Isles, Maine. According to Margaret Lane, "The inspiration for Calico Bush probably came from the story of Marguerite La Croix, who with her husband, John Stanley, moved from Marblehead after 1767, with their many children and became the first permanent residents of Little Cranberry Island. Just north of the 'Head' their hearthstones still lie undisturbed in the field, and they themselves are buried on Maypole Point." Field did not try to tell the woman's story exactly, but used her as inspiration for her book.

The name "calico bush" is used for a mountain laurel native to the eastern United States, including Maine. It is also the title of a ballad referred to in the book.

== Critical reception ==
Considered by some to be her best novel, it was well received by critics. Saturday Review called it "a really good book, simple in its narrative, meaty, sincere". According to The New York Times, "Adult readers as well as boys and girls will be grateful to Rachel Field for this fine and absorbing tale."

Decades later, the book was still well-regarded. Children's literature expert May Hill Arbuthnot called Calico Bush "unusual and powerful" and "model of sound historical fiction. The picture of the times and the people is not only authentic but unusually balanced."

== See also ==
- Hitty, Her First Hundred Years
