= Linda Brookover =

American screenwriter

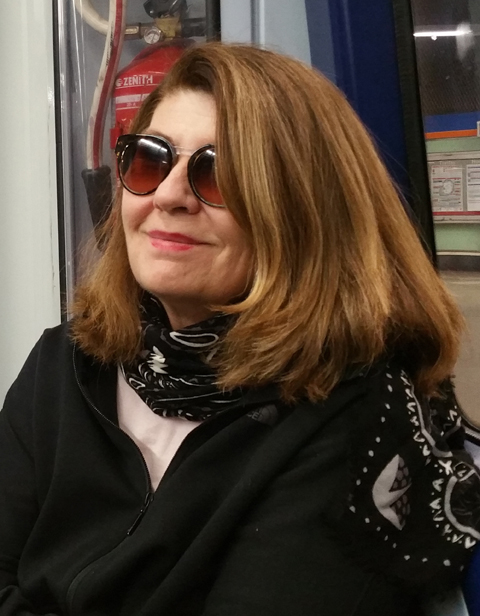
- On Madrid metro, Winter 2019
- Born: Linda Dru Brookover; Marshall, Missouri, U.S.
- Education: University of California, Los Angeles, M.Ed., Educational Administration; Texas A&M University–Commerce, M.Ed. in Bilingual Education; University of Texas at Austin, B.A. in Spanish.
- Occupations: Screenwriter/producer, author, educator
- Years active: 1982–present
- Spouse: Alain Silver

Linda Brookover is a US screenwriter, film producer, essayist on film topics, especially the horror genre and film noir, and children's book author/illustrator.

== Education ==
Brookover graduated from the University of Texas at Austin with a B.A. in Spanish. She has master's degrees in Education from both East Texas State University (now Texas A&M Commerce) and the University of California, Los Angeles.

== Writing ==
In 1997 Brookover optioned the movie rights to the book Time at the Top by Edward Ormondroyd and wrote a screenplay that was produced the following year by Showtime Networks. In 1998, Brookover was the production executive on the independent feature film Beat, for which she co-wrote the ayahuasca scenes between the characters William S. Burroughs (Kiefer Sutherland) and his paid consort Lee (Sam Trammell).

In 2001, she co-wrote and produced with Christopher Coppola the short horror spoof Texas Vampire Massacre, which provided "delightful 'excerpts' from a supposed B&W regional horror" as the fictional drive-in movie in Coppola's Bloodhead aka The Creature of the Sunny Side Up Trailer Park. In 2002, she again co-produced with Coppola, the short Alzheimer's drama A Fish in the Desert, which was based on her short story.

Beginning in 1996 Brookover wrote a series of articles—listed in the Bibliography—about film noir and the “politics” of the horror genre. During the same period she was an editor, interviewer, and essayist for the online Magazine OneWorld, to which she contributed pieces on such varied subject as the Pueblo Revolts, American Indian activist Russell Means, ayahuasca, and the “Crocodile Files” that featured one of the earliest interviews with the late “crocodile hunter Steve Irwin. Most recently Brookover has completed the children's book, Things with Wings

== Production ==
In addition to Beat and the two short films, Brookover was executive producer on the independent features White Nights (2005) and Nightcomer (2013). She has also worked as a performer, assisted in pre-production or in various production capacities on various film and television projects from Men Seeking Women (1997) and Time at the Top to I Survived! (2000) and Ghost Phone (2011).

== Bibliography ==
- “What is this Thing Called Noir” Essay in Film Noir Reader, New York: Limelight, 1996, pages 260-273.
- “Naked Noir: Weegee and Film Noir,” Featured article in The Noir Style, New York: Overlook, pages 44–49.
- “Mad Love is Strange: More Neo-noir Fugitives,” Essay in Film Noir Reader 2, New York, Limelight, 1999, pages 188-195.
- “Blanc et Noir: Crime as Art,” Essay on The Public Eye in Film Noir Reader 2, New York, Limelight, 1999, pages 216-221.
- “What Rough Beast? Insect Politics and The Fly” Essay in Horror Film Reader, New York: Limelight, 2002, pages 236-245
- “Vampire Politics and True Blood,” Featured article in The Vampire Film, Limelight, 2010, pages 314-319.
- “The Top Ten Reasons Why I Hate Zombies (and the Movies about Them),” Featured article in The Zombie Film, Milwaukee: Applause, 2012, pages 204-209.
- Things with Wings, (children's book), Santa Monica: Pendragon Books, 2025.
