= Ormondroyd =

Ormondroyd is a surname. Notable people with the surname include:

- Edward Ormondroyd (1925–2025), American writer
- Ian Ormondroyd (born 1964), English footballer
- Jack Ormondroyd (born 1991), rugby league footballer
- Danny Ormondroyd, lead character in the fictional film Brassed Off
