= Roger Bradfield =

American illustrator (1924–2021)

- Born: September 22, 1924; White Bear Lake, Minnesota, U.S.
- Died: December 31, 2021 (aged 97); Santa Barbara, California, U.S.
- Occupations: Writer, illustrator, cartoonist, painter, world traveller
- Spouse: Joan
- Children: 5
- Website: Official website

Roger Martin Bradfield (September 22, 1924 – December 31, 2021) was an American children's books writer, illustrator, cartoonist, painter, and world traveller.

== Early life ==
Bradfield was born in 1924 in White Bear, Minnesota, and was raised by his mother and grandmother.

== Art ==
Roger Bradfield won several art contests as a child and had early encouragement from his high school art teacher to pursue a career in the arts. His preferred medium is watercolor, although he has also proven himself to be proficient in pencil, pen and ink, and acrylic.

== Food products ==
Bradfield worked on the General Mills cereal boxes of the early 1960s. These included children's cereals, such as Kix, Trix, Wheaties and Jets, among other work. He also worked on Mr Bubble and some projects for the Pillsbury Company. In 1964, he did the spot illustrations for the Bisquick Cookbook for the Bisquick baking product. In 1968 Roger created the first Keebler elves for a series of commercials for FilmFair, an animation studio, which were commissioned by Chicago ad agency, Leo Burnett.

== Children's books ==
"Jolly" Roger Bradfield is perhaps best known for his work as a children's book author and illustrator. He began his writing career when he was teaching himself how to type. Bored with the tutorials of his text book, Bradfield chose to practice his typing by writing something fun. Thus, his first book There's an Elephant in the Bathtub was created. Bradfield went on to write and illustrate several other titles including Pickle-Chiffon Pie, Benjamin Dilley's Thirsty Camel, Giants Come in Different Sizes, The Flying Hockey Stick, and Benjamin Dilley's Lavender Lion. The "Jolly" Roger books are known mostly for their colorful illustrations and wildly imaginative stories.

Bradfield illustrated some of the earliest Sesame Street storybooks, including The Together Book, the first Sesame Street book in the popular Little Golden Books line. He also illustrated Bert's Hall of Great Inventions, Big Bird's Birthday Party, and Sherlock Hemlock and the Great Twiddlebug Mystery.

His children's books have found a second life with Purple House Press—since 2004 the small press has reissued six of Bradfield's books.

== Comics ==
From 1972 to 1978, Bradfield worked as a newspaper syndicate cartoonist creating the daily and Sunday comic strip Dooley's World. The strip featured stories centering on a boy and his collection of living toys. These comics featured many unique visual gags and puns. The strip was distributed by King Features Syndicate.

In addition to the little boy, Dooley, recurring characters were the Professor, a know-it-all wind-up toy figure, Norman, a sophisticated and reflective wind-up knight, Thelma, an unhappy and bullying rag doll, and Max, an introverted mouse.

== Paintings ==
Bradfield created vibrant and colorful paintings. These paintings mostly depict subjects that he found on his world travels and playful and fun images that he conjured up with his imagination. His preferred medium was watercolor, but he also dabbled in acrylic, ink, and pencil.

== World travel ==
He was also an extensive world traveller and visited and sketched in countries that include Greece, Norway, Portugal, France, Italy, Mexico, England, and Spain. On one trip to Mexico, Bradfield's plane had a minor accident resulting in some damage to the plane's wing tanks. So, he enlisted the help of some of the local children getting them to patch the damage up with large wads of bubble gum. The scheme did not work, as the gasoline melted the bubble gum, but the plane managed to reach its destination safely anyway.

== Personal life and death ==
Bradfield and his wife, Joan, raised five children. He died on December 31, 2021, at the age of 97.

== Select bibliography ==
=== Comic strip ===
Dooley's World (King Features Syndicate 1972–1978)

==== Book featuring Dooley's World ====
- Everybody's Somebody!: A Christian Cartoonist Explores the Foibles and Frailties of Ordinary Folk with Dooley and His Friends by Roger Bradfield

=== Children's books ===
- There's an Elephant in the Bathtub (1964)
- Hello, Rock (1965, 2012) Listed as one of the top 100 Children's Books of all time by Time Magazine in 2020
- Hello Friend (1965)
- The Big, Happy 1-2-3 (co-authored with Joan Bradfield) (1965)
- The Big, Happy ABC (co-authored with Joan Bradfield) (1965)
- Giants Come in Different Sizes (1966, 2011)
- The Flying Hockey Stick (1966, 2007)
- A Good Knight for Dragons (1967)

==== Pickle-Chiffon Pie series ====
- Pickle-Chiffon Pie (1967, 2004)
- The Pickle-Chiffon Pie Olympics (2011)

==== Benjamin Dilley series ====
- Benjamin Dilley's Thirsty Camel (1960s, 2012)
- Benjamin Dilley's Lavender Lion

==== Tonka Tale stories ====
Mini books for Tonka that came free with the purchases of some of their toy vehicles in the early 1970s:

- Magic Garden: A Tonka Tale by Jolly Roger Bradfield (came with Tonka Jeepster Runabout No. 2460)
- Toby Digs In: A Tonka Tale by Jolly Roger Bradfield (1973)
- Toby and Smokey: A Tonka Tale by Jolly Roger Bradfield (1974) (came with Tonka Frantic Flivver, number 458 and Camping The Smokey Bear Way, number 5020) - featuring Smokey the Bear

==== As author only ====
Books that Roger Bradfield wrote or co-wrote, but did not illustrate:

- Who are You (co-authored with Joan Bradfield, and illustrated by Winnie Fitch) (1966)
- Charles Schulz Master Cartoonist (Art Instruction Schools Inc, 1975)

==== Illustrations for other authors ====
- The Bisquick Cookbook: Recipes from Betty Crocker in Answer to Your Requests by General Mills
- The Box of Important Things by Ann Hellie (1968)
- Toby the Rock Hound by Jane Dwyer Walrath (1979)
- Alvin Fernald's Incredible Buried Treasure by Clifford B. Hicks (2009)
- All in Good Time by Edward Ormondroyd (2011)

===== Sesame Street tie-in books =====
- The Together Book by Revena Dwight (1971)
- Bert's Hall of Great Inventions by Revena Dwight (1972)
- Big Bird's Birthday Party (A Golden Play and Learn Book) (1972)
- Sherlock Hemlock and the Great Twiddlebug Mystery: or The Mystery of the Terrible Mess in My Friend's Front Yard by Revena Dwight (1972)

=== Punch-out kits ===
Punch-out kits illustrated by Roger Bradfield for Pillsbury:

- Circus Party Kit from Pillsbury ("Today Only Greatest Little Show on Earth!") (1958) (illustrated circus themed punch-out kit)
- Country Fair Party from Pillsbury (1958) (illustrated country fair/farm themed punch-out kit)
