= Everybody's Somebody =

Everybody's Somebody may refer to:

- Everybody's Somebody, a 1999 album by Kele Le Roc, or the title track
- "Everybody's Somebody", a 2018 song by Don Diablo featuring Bully Songs from the album Future
- Everybody's Somebody!: A Christian Cartoonist Explores the Foibles and Frailties of Ordinary Folk with Dooley and His Friends, a book by children's book author Roger Bradfield
