= The Blueberry Pie Elf =

Children's courtesy book written by Jane Thayer released in 1961

- First US edition
- Author: Jane Thayer
- Illustrator: Seymour Fleishman
- Language: English
- Genre: Children's
- Publisher: Oliver & Boyd, Edinburgh (UK); William Morrow (US); Purple House Press 2008 (US)
- Publication date: 1961
- Publication place: United States
- Media type: Print (Paperback and Hardback)
- Pages: 32 pages

The Blueberry Pie Elf is a children's courtesy book that was written by Jane Thayer and illustrated by Seymour Fleishman. Originally released in 1961 by Oliver & Boyd in the UK and William Morrow in the US, the story, written in prose, follows a little elf who is desperately trying to get a family to bake more of the blueberry pie that he loves so much.

== Plot ==
Elmer is an elf who lives with a family of bakers. One day the family bakes a blueberry pie, which Elmer proceeds to jump into and eats his fill. Upon eating the pie, Elmer falls in love with blueberry pie and can't wait to get his hands on another one. Unfortunately, the family cannot see him, hear him, or feel him, and he is forced to wait for them to bake another delicious pie. The next week, Elmer notices that they are baking another pie and gets very excited, but is in vain when he smells baking apples. Frustrated with his inability to communicate or be seen by the family, Elmer sets out to try and alert the bakers to his presence. To do this, he begins helping out around the house making beds, washing dishes, and doing other chores to get noticed. Though his efforts are appreciated, the family continues not to notice him and they bake another pie, cherry this time. Deciding he would try to determine whether he likes a different flavored pie better than blueberry, Elmer jumps into the fresh-baked pie and starts eating. Disappointed in the taste, and not realizing that the cherries stained his feet red, Elmer hops out of the pie and walks away. The family notices his footprints and realize that it was the little elf who had been doing the house work.

After the bakers notice Elmer, they take the hint left by his help with the chores and return the favor by baking him a big blueberry pie. Elmer is overjoyed, and remembers to leave his thanks to the family by writing on the table with his blueberry-stained feet.

== Setting ==
The story takes place in the home of a family of bakers. It follows the life of the little elf, Elmer, and his adventures attempting to convince the family to bake another blueberry pie.

== Character ==
Elmer is a little elf who absolutely loves blueberry pie. Being invisible, he struggles throughout the story with attracting the attention of the family with whom he lives.

The family is a group of bakers living in the house with Elmer. It is not mentioned how many are in the family or what their names are.
