= And Now Tomorrow =

1944 film by Irving Pichel

- Directed by: Irving Pichel
- Screenplay by: Frank Partos; Raymond Chandler
- Based on: And Now Tomorrow; 1942 novel by Rachel Field
- Produced by: Fred Kohlmar
- Starring: Alan Ladd; Loretta Young; Susan Hayward; Barry Sullivan
- Cinematography: Daniel L. Fapp
- Edited by: W. Duncan Mansfield
- Music by: Victor Young
- Production company: Paramount Pictures
- Distributed by: Paramount Pictures
- Release date: November 22, 1944
- Running time: 86 minutes
- Country: United States
- Language: English
- Box office: 891,418 admissions (France, 1946)

And Now Tomorrow is a 1944 American drama film based on the best-selling novel, published in 1942 by Rachel Field, directed by Irving Pichel and written by Raymond Chandler. Both center around one doctor's attempt for curing deafness. The film stars Alan Ladd, Loretta Young, and Susan Hayward. Its tagline was Who are you that a man can't make love to you?. It is also known as Prisoners of Hope.

== Plot ==
Emily Blair, born into a very wealthy family in Blairtown, becomes deaf after contracting meningitis. She has left home, trying in vain to find a cure for her deafness, but is now returning to Blairtown. Before leaving, she was engaged to Jeff Stoddard, but put the wedding on hold because of her illness and the following hearing disability.

On her return home, she shares a taxi with Dr. Merek Vance, who also grew up in Blairtown, but under less fortunate circumstances. He works as a physician in Pittsburgh. Merek's first impression of Emily is that she is a terrible snob, and he is surprised to learn that she can read lips.

Emily is unaware that her former fiancé Jeff and her younger sister Janice have fallen in love with each other. Jeff is reluctant to tell Emily about his new relationship, feeling sorry for her.

Merek is unaware that he is summoned back to his hometown to help Dr. Weeks, Blairtown's only physician, in trying to cure Emily's deafness. Merek has a record of curing deaf patients in the past. When Merek learns the reason for his being summoned there, he is disappointed, but agrees to help as a favor to Dr. Weeks.

At a dinner at the Blair residence that evening, Merek tells Emily what he really thinks of her, and it turns out his father used to work in one of the Blair factories, but was fired right before Christmas one year. Merek still remembers how Emily stared at him at the company's Christmas gathering.

Emily is not keen on the idea of letting Merek use her as a "guinea pig", but since she has exhausted all her other alternatives, she eventually agrees to let him try to cure her.

The treatment begins, and Merek tries to cure Emily not only of her deafness, but also of her snobbery. She gains the respect of some of the factory workers, the Gallos, when she helps the doctor treat their child, Tommy. Merek starts to change his view of Emily, and tells her not to marry Jeff, as she has planned.

Upon their return to the Blair residence, Merek accidentally sees Jeff and Janice together, and understands that they are an item. He keeps the discovery to himself, and doesn't reveal anything to Emily.

Some time later, Merek concludes that his treatment is not working, but he tells her that he has fallen in love with her, despite her snobbish manners. Emily doesn't believe he is sincere, and they stop the treatment altogether and Merek goes back to Pittsburgh.

Since Jeff still hasn't told Emily about his love for Janice, Emily starts planning for their wedding again. She hears of a new treatment that Merek has successfully tested on rabbits, and asks him to return and try it on her too. Reluctantly, Merek agrees, but when Emily is given the serum, she falls into a coma.

Devastated, Merek goes back to Pittsburgh. When Emily eventually wakes up from her coma, she discovers that she has gotten her hearing back. She overhears Jeff telling Janice that he loves her, but she also understands that she herself is in love with Merek. Emily then goes to Pittsburgh to confess her love for Merek, and they reconcile.

== Cast ==
- Alan Ladd as Dr. Merek Vance
- Loretta Young as Emily Blair
- Susan Hayward as Janice Blair
- Barry Sullivan as Jeff Stoddard
- Beulah Bondi as Aunt Em
- Cecil Kellaway as Dr. Weeks
- Grant Mitchell as Uncle Wallace
- Helen Mack as Angeletta Gallo
- Darryl Hickman as Joe
- Anthony Caruso as Peter Gallo
- Jonathan Hale as Dr. Sloane
- Conrad Binyon as Bobby
- Connie Leon as Hester (uncredited)

== Production ==
The film was based on the last novel of Rachel Field. Field died on 15 March 1942, when the story was being serialised in a magazine; it was published in May. The book became a best seller. Paramount bought the film rights for $75,000, outbidding Warner Bros and David O. Selznick. They originally announced George Stevens would direct. Susan Hayward was announced early on to play one of the two sisters. Loretta Young and Joel McCrea were then named to play the other leads. Talbot Jennings was reported as working on the script. Irving Pichel was assigned to direct. For a time Veronica Lake was mentioned as Young's co-star but Hayward ended up playing the role.

In September McCrea dropped out to do war work and was replaced by Franchot Tone. Jane Murfin was then working on the script. The film was meant to start production in November. Then Alan Ladd was invalided out of the army and became available for the role; Tone was dropped and replaced by Ladd. Hedda Hopper reported in her regular column around this time that "when Loretta Young and Alan Ladd played in China together, he swore he'd never make another picture with her. That's all forgotten now."

Raymond Chandler signed a long-term contract with Paramount in late 1943 and he was put to work on the script.

Filming took place in December 1943 through to January 1944.

Loretta Young later said she "never made any contact" with Ladd as an actor:

He wouldn't look at me. He'd say, "I love you..." he'd be looking out there some place. Finally, I said, "Alan, I'm he-ere!!"... I think he was very conscious of his looks. Alan would not look beyond a certain point in the camera because he didn't think he looked good... Jimmy Cagney was not tall but somehow Jimmy was at terms with himself, always. I don't think Alan Ladd ever came to terms with himself.

== Reception ==
The Los Angeles Times said the film had "taken a provocative idea and treated it conventionally."

The film was a hit at the box office.

== Adaptations ==
Ladd and Young reprised their roles in a one-hour adaptation of the film for Lux Radio Theatre on May 21, 1945. It was introduced by guest producer Preston Sturges. On June 10, 1946, Lux Radio Theatre broadcast a second adaptation, this time with Olivia de Havilland and John Lund in the lead roles.

== See also ==
- List of American films of 1944
- List of films featuring the deaf and hard of hearing
