= Bruce Kimmel =

American actor and director (born 1947)

- Born: 8 December 1947 (age 78)
- Other name: Guy Haines
- Occupations: Actor; composer; director; singer; songwriter
- Children: 1

Bruce Kimmel (born December 8, 1947), also known as Guy Haines, is an American actor, writer, director, composer, and Grammy-nominated CD producer (for the revival of Hello, Dolly).

== Acting ==
=== TV ===
Kimmel appeared in many TV shows, such as The Partridge Family (multiple episodes), Happy Days, Laverne & Shirley, Alice, M*A*S*H, Donny & Marie (four guest shots), and various pilots. His other TV appearances include The Young Lawyers; Honeymoon Suite; the TV-movie Beggarman, Thief; The Bob Crane Show; Alice;Forget-Me-Not-Lane on PBS; Carl Reiner's Good Heavens; Rob Reiner's The Super; Lucas Tanner; Doctors' Hospital; Marcus Welby, MD; the TV-remake of the film If I Had a Million; Dinah and Her New Best Friends, which was a CBS summer replacement for The Carol Burnett Show and aired for eight weeks in the summer of 1976.

=== Movies ===
He acted in the films The Apple Dumpling Gang (1975), The First Nudie Musical (1976), Racquet (1979), with Bert Convy, Tanya Roberts, Lynda Day George, Björn Borg, and Phil Silvers, First Family (1980) and The Creature Wasn't Nice (1983).

== Directing ==
=== Film ===
Kimmel wrote and directed The First Nudie Musical (1976).

The First Nudie Musical became one of the first cable-TV hits and featured in the second volume of Danny Peary's Cult Movies. The movie was picked up for streaming by Quiver Distribution and has been streaming on all the major services, including HBO, Showtime, Paramount+, Vudu, and many others.

His second film,The Creature Wasn't Nice (1983) was completely recut by its producers, with no involvement from Kimmel, retitled Spaceship, played a short theatrical run, then went to cable TV. The film was retitled once again as Naked Space for some DVD releases with an incorrect aspect ratio. In 2019, a special edition DVD was released, finally allowing audiences to see Kimmel's original cut of the film in its proper ratio of 1:85:1. The DVD also included Spaceship cut (in 1:85:1), three commentary tracks, trailer, and a 24-bit version of the soundtrack.

He was also the director (as Mark Rutland) of Prime Suspect (1989).

=== TV ===
He also wrote and directed multiple segments of the HBO comedy series Likely Stories. He directed an award-winning KABC documentary called Weekday Heroes, and for home video he directed the Hanna-Barbera show, Rappin' and Rhymin'.

=== Web Streaming and Series ===
He wrote and directed the web series Outside the Box, which, was initially uploaded on YouTube, and later became a Broadway World exclusive series for its second season. The third season of Outside the Box, intended to start filming in April 2013, never came to fruition.

In 2021, he directed two filmed productions that were designed for streaming, an original musical Tonight's the Night, starring Eric Petersen and Hartley Powers, and a thriller titled Revenge. Kimmel wrote and directed two original shows designed for streaming and playing online. Tonight's the Night was an original musical starring Eric Petersen and Hartley Powers. The show was designed and directed to appear as if it was live on Zoom, but it was instead filmed and then edited (by Marshall Harvey). The second show was a thriller titled Revenge, which was also designed to appear as if it were happening live on Zoom, but was filmed and edited.

On April 23, 2023, Kimmel's new streaming series Sami premiered on Amazon Prime. A short form comedy series with music, it stars Sami Staitman, Cindy Williams, Kerry O'Malley, and Karim Hazime. Guest stars over the ten episodes include Charles Busch, Karen Ziemba, Brad Oscar, Liz Larsen, Sal Viviano, Allie Trimm, and others. Each episode runs between ten and eighteen minutes. There is one original song in each episode except the season finale, which has five songs. The show is about a young actress living in New York.

== Theater directing ==
Kimmel has written many plays/musicals, including a thriller, Deceit (2006), and a musical, The Brain From Planet X (2006). The Brain is a spoof of 1950s alien invasion movies and was featured in the New York Festival of New Musicals (NYMF) in 2007, and the Festival of New American Musicals in 2008, with a run at The Chance Theater in Anaheim, California. Two of his other musicals, Stages and Together Again are paired on a Kritzerland CD. His first musical, Start at the Top, is the only show to have had a "backer's audition" on The Merv Griffin Show.

In 2011, he directed a musical revue, Lost and Unsung, based on his albums "Lost in Boston" and "Unsung Musicals". In 2014 he directed critically acclaimed productions of Li'l Abner and Inside Out. In 2015, he wrote the book, music, and lyrics for the one-girl musical, "Welcome to My World", and also directed. The show starred fifteen-year-old Sami Staitman, who was nominated for a Robby Award as Best Actress. In 2016, he created a musical revue, L.A. Now and Then.

In 2017, he directed a production of Dial M for Murder, as well as the world premiere of a new musical, Levi, the story of Levi Strauss, with a book by Larry Cohen and a score by the Sherman Brothers. This show, which was originally written in 1979, was previously unproduced. Kimmel provided additional material to the book as well as the lyrics to a new song with music by Richard M. Sherman.

In 2018, he directed the world premiere of the musical, A Carol Christmas, a modernized, feminized version of the Dickens classic. The book was by Doug Haverty, and Kimmel wrote the music and lyrics. He also directed the world premiere of the satirical parody revue, Everybody Rise! A Resistance Cabaret, which centers on the Trump administration. In 2019/2020, he directed back-to-back productions of The Man Who Came to Dinner, starring Jim Beaver and Barry Pearl, and Doug Haverty's play, In My Mind's Eye. In 2022, he directed an updated version of his musical revue, L.A. Now and Then, in 2023 he directed a production of the rare Kander and Ebb musical 70, Girls, 70, and in early 2025 he directed the West Coast premiere of the even rarer musical, Drat! The Cat! He has won many L.A. awards for his work as director and writer.

=== Cabaret ===
From 2010, Kimmel has produced and hosted a monthly cabaret series, Kritzerland at... The series recently produced its 132nd show, making it L.A.'s longest-running cabaret show of its kind. The show began at the Gardenia in September 2010, played there until December 2011, them moved to Sterling's Upstairs at Vitello's for three shows, and then to Sterling's Upstairs at The Federal, where it played until August 2018. Beginning in September 2018, the show moved back to Vitello's and is currently performing at Catalina Jazz Club.

During the COVID-19 pandemic of 2020/2021, Kimmel moved the monthly Kritzerland shows online. In 2021, Kritzerland returned to live shows at Feinstein at Vitello's and continued there through December of 2022, when the room shut down and became a lounge. In 2023, Kritzerland returned for three shows at The Gardenia, but the room was simply too small. Then in June did a 95th birthday concert for Richard Sherman at the Write-Off Room. Kritzerland then took a hiatus until they found a new venue - in May of 2024 they took up residence at Catalina Bar and Grill in Hollywood.

== Record producing ==
From 1988 to 1993, Kimmel co-owned the speciality label, Bay Cities, releasing over 100 albums that include American classical music, cast albums, and soundtracks. In 1993, Kimmel became a full time record producer with his own division at Varèse Sarabande, producing many cast albums (Broadway and off-Broadway), Broadway singers, and musical theater concept albums, initially for the Varèse Sarabande, and then for Fynsworth Alley, a company he founded. He was nominated for a Grammy for the revival cast album of Hello, Dolly!. An album he produced with jazz pianist Fred Hersch was also nominated for a Grammy.

Kimmel has produced over 180 CDs, including the Unsung Musicals and Lost in Boston series, Unsung Sondheim, The Stephen Schwartz Album, The Alan Menken Album, The Stephen Sondheim Album, Sondheim at the Movies, a classic series of Sondheim shows in jazz with Terry Trotter, vocal albums with Petula Clark, Helen Reddy, Liz Callaway, Laurie Beechman, Rebecca Luker, Jason Graae, Brent Barrett, Michelle Nicastro, cast albums for The King and I, I Love You, You're Perfect, Now Change, Bells Are Ringing, The Best Little Whorehouse in Texas (with Ann-Margret), Little Me (with Martin Short), and Ruthless! The Musical.

His album Titanic: The Ultimate Collection entered the Billboard Classical Crossover chart at number two and remained on the chart for forty consecutive weeks. His current label Kritzerland has issued close to 400 albums including cast albums, singers, and a series of reissues of limited edition soundtracks.

Kimmel has released two albums as a singer, using the pseudonym "Guy Haines" (named for Farley Granger's character in Strangers on a Train): Haines His Way (2001) and New Guy in Town (2007). Also a songwriter, Kimmel produced the album "It Might Be Fun" by singer Sandy Bainum, featuring his original songs, including his collaboration with Richard M. Sherman (of the Sherman Brothers), "Two Roads."

At the 2015 Mac Awards, Kimmel's song "Simply" won the award for Best Song of the Year. He also won a Scenie Award for Best Score for A Carol Christmas.

== Writing ==
Kimmel has written twenty-eight books, including a coming-of-age trilogy, Benjamin Kritzer, Kritzerland, and Kritzer Time, mysteries titled Writer's Block and Rewind, and a mystery series Murder at Hollywood High, Murder at the Grove, Murder at the Hollywood Historical Society, Murder at The Masquers, Murder at the School Musical, Murder at the Hollywood Division, and Murder at the Magic Castle. His other novels include the western Red Gold, Patrick Bronstein Presents, a time-travel novel titled Thrill Ride, and GEE. He also wrote a book of short fiction titled How To Write A Dirty Book and Other Stories. Between 2020 and 2022, a compendium of lyrics titled Simply - A Lifetime of Lyrics, a mystery titled Some Days Are Murder, a mystery that introduced retired agent and private detective Harry Stearns, and then wrote the second Stearns mystery, titled Tis the Season to Be Murdered were published. In May 2023, his novel, Preview Harvey was published. And in October 2023, twenty years after Kritzer Time he continued the saga of Benjamin Kritzer in a fourth book, Kritzer World. In March of 2024, his twenty-fifth book was published, Directed by about his over sixty years of directing for film, TV, and theater, as well as his two web series. In 2025, his third book in the Harry Stearns mystery series was published, titled Vegas Can be Murder. In August 2025, his latest book came out, titled Richard and Me - A Supercalifragilistic Friendship a memoir about his long and close friendship with the legendary Richard M. Sherman of the Sherman Brothers. In March of 2026, his book Person Unknown came out - a mystery novel involving an amnesia victim.

He has also published two memoirs, There's Mel, There's Woody, and There's You - My Life in the Slow Lane, and Album Produced By.

=== Books ===
- Benjamin Kritzer, 2002
- Kritzerland, 2003
- Kritzer Time, 2004
- Writer's Block, 2004 Mystery novel
- Rewind, 2005 Mystery novel
- How to Write a Dirty Book and Other Stories, 2006 Short story collection
- Murder at Hollywood High, 2007 The first Adriana Hofstetter mystery
- Murder at the Grove, 2008 The second Adriana Hofstetter mystery
- Murder at the Hollywood Historical Society, 2009 The third Adriana Hofstetter mystery
- There's Mel, There's Woody, and There's You, 2010, a memoir of his acting, writing, and directing days
- Murder at the Masquers, 2011, the fourth Adriana Hofstetter mystery
- Album Produced By, April 2012, a follow-up memoir to There's Mel, There's Woody, and There's You
- Murder at the School Musical, May 2013, the fifth book in the Adriana Hofstetter series
- Red Gold, March 2014, a western novel
- Murder at the Hollywood Division, March 2015, the sixth book in the Adriana Hofstetter series
- Patrick Bronstein Presents, March 2016, a comic novel
- Thrill Ride, March 2017, a time-travel novel
- GEE, March 2018
- Murder at the Magic Castle, March 2019, the seventh in the Adriana Hofstetter mystery series
- Simply - A Lifetime of Lyrics, March 2020, a compendium of lyrics written from 1962 to present
- Some Days Are Murder, March 2021, the first Harry Stearns mystery novel
- Tis the Season to Be Murdered, April 2022, a sequel to Some Days Are Murder
- Preview Harvey, May 2023
- Kritzer World, October 2023
- Directed by, March 2024
- Vegas Can Be Murder, March 2025, the third Harry Stearns mystery novel.
- Richard and Me - A Supercalifragilistic Friendship, August 2025
- Person Unknown, March 2026, a mystery novel involving an amnesia victim
