= The Mad Scientists' Club =

Children's book series by Bertrand R. Brinley

The Mad Scientists' Club is a series of four books written for children by Bertrand R. Brinley (1917 – 1994) and illustrated by Charles Geer. The books focus on the adventures of the seven boys who make up the club. The original stories that form the majority of the first book were first published in Boys' Life. All the books are set in the 1960s, contemporary at the time of the first story's publication. The setting is the fictional town of Mammoth Falls, which is on the edge of the also fictional Strawberry Lake. Interactions with the setting and many of the townspeople are an important part of the narrative. All of the stories include scientific and technological solutions to problems, which vary from pranks carried out by the boys themselves, to the rescue of a crashed Air Force pilot.

== Books in the series ==
- The Mad Scientists' Club (1965, 2001) consisting of:
  - "The Strange Sea Monster of Strawberry Lake" (1960), first published in Boys' Life (September 1961), with illustrations by Harold Eldridge
  - "The Big Egg" (1964)
  - "The Secret of the Old Cannon" (1963), first published in Boys' Life (January 1966), with illustrations by Marvin Friedman
  - "The Unidentified Flying Man of Mammoth Falls" (1962), first published in Boys' Life (November 1962), with illustrations by Harold Eldridge
  - "The Great Gas Bag Race" (1964), first published in Boys' Life (March 1966), with illustrations by Bernard Fuchs
  - "The Voice in the Chimney" (1964)
  - "Night Rescue" (1961), first published in Boys' Life (February 1964), with illustrations by David Stone
- The New Adventures of the Mad Scientists' Club (1968, 2002) consisting of:
  - "Big Chief Rainmaker" (1965)
  - "The Telltale Transmitter" (1966)
  - "The Cool Cavern" (1966)
  - "The Flying Sorcerer" (1968)
  - "The Great Confrontation" (1968)
- The Big Kerplop; A Mad Scientists' Club Adventure (1974, 2003)
- The Big Chunk of Ice (2005)

The title of The Big Kerplop was supposed to be The Big Kerplop!, but the original publisher, MacRae Smith Company, dropped the exclamation mark, which has now been restored. Even though it was written 14 years after "The Strange Sea Monster of Strawberry Lake", chronologically it is the first story in the series, telling how the Mad Scientists' Club came into being and the full story behind their long-standing animosity with Harmon Muldoon.

== Synopsis ==
Living in the fictional small town of Mammoth Falls, the members of the Mad Scientists' Club are:

- Jeff Crocker — President
- Henry Mulligan — Vice President and Chief of Research
- Dinky Poore — the smallest and nimblest
- Freddy Muldoon — the heaviest boy, but also known as "Little Bright Eyes" because he often notices things that others overlook
- Homer Snodgrass — often uses a flowery style of speaking as he reads a lot of literature
- Mortimer Dalrymple — added to the group because he might have extra radio equipment, and because he was an "electronic bug"
- Charlie Finckledinck — the narrator of the stories

The club meets in Jeff Crocker's barn, which has been outfitted with gadgets built by the club members as well as booby traps. His parents ownership of the barn is part of the reason Jeff is club president. Dinky Poore is the smallest and most sarcastic of the Mad Scientists; this is sometimes relevant to the stories, as in "The Great Gas Bag Race", in which the boys prepare to compete in a hot-air balloon race without deciding which two Mad Scientists will have the honor of crewing the balloon; since Dinky weighs less than anyone else in the club, he is the only one who is certain of being chosen.

During the course of the books, the boys often use technology (such as ham radios) and science to pull off harebrained schemes. For example, in "The Strange Sea Monster of Strawberry Lake," they build a fake sea monster out of chicken wire mounted to a canoe, and row it out on Strawberry Lake. When it gets too dangerous to take the boat out on the lake in person, because hunters are preparing to shoot it with an elephant gun, they rig a remote control system to operate it at a distance.

The Mad Scientists' Club is an Explorer Scout organization, something that is mentioned occasionally in passing, but generally does not drive the stories.

In contrast to the supernatural, mystical, romantic, or preachy moral elements usually found in children's books, The Mad Scientists' Club books build their plot devices around science, mechanical inclination, a do it yourself ethic, and some good-natured pranks, making the boys in these books sort of junior precursors to MacGyver, or a fictional counterpart to the real-life Rocket Boys. The early stories and the first book in the series were published in the wake of the impact of Sputnik 1 and the Space Race and reflect the thinking of that period. The first book even includes a plug for joining the United States Air Force in the last story, "Night Rescue". There are two odd, inexplicable exceptions to the usually science-based, non-supernatural nature of the stories. They are "The Secret of the Old Cannon" in the first book — at the end of the story it is hinted the boys unwittingly photographed a ghost — and the Indian Sun Dance from "Big Chief Rainmaker" in the second book. The level of technology found in these books is, of course, low by modern standards, with no commercial home computers or miniaturized electronics, but the technology depicted in the books — home-built computers, scuba, ham radio, helicopters, remotely radio-controlled devices — was, at the time, typical of the cutting edge of technology during the post-World War II, pre-Internet era. The science is accurate; Dinky provides actual Houdini escapology in "The Telltale Transmitter" that readers would do well to remember if they ever found themselves tied up.

Harmon Muldoon is the arch-enemy of the Mad Scientists' Club. Cousin to Freddy and brother to Homer's girlfriend Daphne, Harmon was expelled from the Mad Scientists' Club "for conduct unbecoming a scientist and for giving away secret information". Harmon responded by founding his own gang dedicated to interfering with the Mad Scientists' Club in any way they can. It is not stated whether Harmon's gang engages in any activities beyond pestering the Mad Scientists, nor is it absolutely clear how many are in the gang.

Harmon was the radio expert when he was in the club, and has equal if not better radio equipment, as hinted in "The Strange Sea Monster of Strawberry Lake", where he temporarily jammed the signals sent by The Mad Scientists Club and came very close to unmasking the monster. In "The Great Confrontation" he goes too far and kidnaps Freddy and Dinky. However, Harmon's only triumph comes in "The Cool Cavern" where he makes such fools of the Mad Scientists that Henry uncharacteristically loses his temper. In "Big Chief Rainmaker" a truce is declared with Harmon's gang because the Mad Scientists need their help. The named members of Harmon's gang are:

- Harmon Muldoon — the gang leader. He is a radio expert and "a big blabbermouth".
- Stony Martin — a "loudmouth". The gang meets at the back of his house.
- Buzzy McCauliffe
- Joe Turner
- Speedie Brown — "one of the best tree climbers in Harmon's gang".

Harmon's gang meets on the second story of an old garage at the back of Stony Martin's house. "It's a neat place to spy from" for the Mad Scientists Club. Stony and Buzzy are the members who appear the most frequently in the series, as they are constant companions to Harmon.

Other characters include:

- Alonzo Scragg — Mayor of Mammoth Falls
- Abner Sharples — rival of Mayor Scragg, lawyer and politician
- Chief Harold Putney — Chief of Police
- Constable Billy Dahr
- Zeke Boniface — junkyard operator and ally of the Mad Scientists
- Richard the Deep Breather — Zeke's truck
- Kaiser Bill — Zeke's guard-dog
- Colonel March — military ally of the Mad Scientists
- Elmer Pridgin — a hunter who literally holds the key to "The Secret of the Old Cannon"
- Jim Callahan — city engineer
- Mr. Willis — bank manager
- Seth Hawkins — congressman for Mammoth Falls
- Charlie Brown — town treasurer
- Daphne Muldoon — Harmon's sister, Freddy's cousin, and Homer's girlfriend
- Melissa Plunkett — Stony Martin's girlfriend with stick-out teeth
- Mike Corcoran — owner of the Idle Hour Pool Palace; he sponsors Harmon's entry in "The Great Gas Bag Race" and keeps the Unidentified Flying Man on display in his front window.
- Mrs. Abner Larrabee — President of the Greater Mammoth Falls Garden Circle, conducts the Indian Sun Dance in "Big Chief Rainmaker".
- Jason Barnaby — orchardist
- Ned Carver — barber
- Bud Stewart — reporter for the Cleveland Plain Dealer.
- Jasper Okeby — truck-garden farmer and the most cantankerous character in Mammoth Falls.
- Bo McSweeney — one of the few athletic heroes of Mammoth Falls and town favorite.
- Matilda Pratt — well-known personality for weighing over 300 pounds and having 13 girls.
- Old Pincushion — the trout nobody can catch.
- Professor Igor Stratavarious — State University professor who takes the Mad Scientists Club to Austria in The Big Chunk of Ice.
- Angelina Angelo and Angela Angelino — students who accompany the Mad Scientists to Austria in The Big Chunk of Ice. They become the first female members of the club.

== Publication history ==
The Mad Scientists began as a series of short stories in Boys' Life magazine, the official youth magazine of the Boy Scouts of America. They were later collected into two volumes, The Mad Scientists' Club and The New Adventures of the Mad Scientists' Club, originally published by the MacRae Smith Company of Philadelphia. Only about 1000 copies of the third novel, The Big Kerplop!, were published in 1974 before MacRae Smith went bankrupt, so it is not well known. Later publications in 1965 included Scholastic Book Services in paperback out of New York, London, and Richmond Hill, Ontario.

Sheridan Brinley, the son of the author, authorized Purple House Press to reprint these books starting in 2001. The new edition of The Big Kerplop! was released in 2003 (with the exclamation point included), which includes all-new interior illustrations by Geer. The earlier MacRae Smith version is the only Mad Scientists' Club title without interior drawings since Macrae Smith never commissioned them. On November 17, 2005, Purple House Press released the final book, the previously unpublished second novel titled The Big Chunk of Ice, which was newly illustrated by Geer.

== Adaptations ==
The 1971 television feature The Strange Monster of Strawberry Cove was based on "The Strange Sea Monster of Strawberry Lake". Starring Burgess Meredith, Agnes Moorehead, and Larry D. Mann, the movie had multiple broadcasts as part of The Wonderful World of Disney.
