= Time at the Top =

- Genre: Family/Science Fiction/Comedy
- Based on: Time at the Top by Edward Ormondroyd
- Written by: Linda Brookover; Alain Silver
- Directed by: Jimmy Kaufman
- Starring: Timothy Busfield; Elisha Cuthbert
- Theme music composer: Simon Carpenter
- Countries of origin: United States; Canada
- Original language: English

Production
- Executive producers: Alain Silver; Jon Turtle
- Producers: Claudio Castravelli; Jean Guy Despres
- Cinematography: François Protat
- Running time: 96 minutes

Original release
- Network: The Movie Channel; Hallmark Movie Channel
- Release: January 17, 1999

Time at the Top, is a 1999 cable television film for Showtime that was directed by Jimmy Kaufman and written by Linda Brookover and Alain Silver based on the book by Edward Ormondroyd. It stars Elisha Cuthbert, Timothy Busfield, and Lynne Adams.

== Synopsis ==
Susan Shawson (Elisha Cuthbert), a 13-year old high-school, inadvertently travels back in time in her apartment building's elevator. As altered by Dr. Reynolds (Michael Sinelnikoff), a retired physicist living upstairs, this secret time machine transports Susan from New York of 1998 back to exactly the same spot in 1881. There she meets Victoria Walker (Gabrielle Boni), a girl her age in need of assistance with her own family problems, most notably a schemer named Cyrus Sweeney (Jean LeClerc) trying to take advantage of her widowed mother Nora (Lynne Adams).

When she returns to the present, Susan discovers that her widower father Frank (Timothy Busfield) has been frantically searching for her, assisted by neighbor Edward Ormondroyd (Richard Jutras) and local police detective Gagin (Charles Edwin Powell). Gradually discovering the power of time travel, Susan, Victoria, and her young brother Robert (Matthew Harbour), travel back and forth in time and succeed in changing both the past and the future.

== Cast ==
- Timothy Busfield as Frank Shawson
- Elisha Cuthbert as Susan Shawson
- Gabrielle Boni as Victoria Walker
- Lynne Adams as Nora Walker/Nina Shawson
- Matthew Harbour as Robert Walker
- Jean LeClerc as Cyrus Sweeney
- Richard Jutras as Edward Ormondroyd
- Michael Sinelnikoff as Dr. Reynolds
- Charles Edwin Powell as Detective Gagin
- Howard Rosenstein as Austin
- Michel Perron as Mr. Bodoni
- Nadia Verrucci as Mrs. McLernon

== Production ==
Time at the Top was part of Showtime's reported commitment to "producing original family-oriented films" in 1998–99, as part of their "Original Pictures for All Ages" franchise. The script, written by Linda Brookover and Alain Silver, was based on a novel by Edward Ormondroyd.

== Reception ==
Los Angeles Times critic Don Heckman reviewed the film as "predictable" and a "bit heavy-handed at times", with a "slogging sort of pace", though Heckman praised Cuthbert's performance as Susan as "skillfully portrayed".

== Accolades ==
Time at the Top was awarded the Certificate of Merit as a Finalist in the Houston World Film Festival and also The Film Advisory Board's Award of Excellence. It was in competition at the Cairo International Film Festival and Falstaff International Film Festival and also screened at the Festival of Festivals, Saint Petersburg

== Home media ==
Showtime licensed video rights for Time at the Top to Square Dog Pictures, a subsidiary of Blockbuster Video, which printed hundreds of VHS copies in order to fill enough shelves at Blockbuster Video locations to make a given title as if it were a major release.
