= Bertrand R. Brinley =

American writer

Bertrand R. Brinley (19 June 1917 in Hudson, New York – 20 October 1994 in Luray, Virginia) was an American writer of short stories and children's tales. He was best known for his Mad Scientists' Club stories.

The stories in The Mad Scientists' Club originally appeared over several years in Boys' Life magazine, starting in 1961, and were later collected into book form. The Mad Scientists' Club, The New Adventures of The Mad Scientists' Club and The Big Kerplop! were first published by the now-defunct MacRae Smith Company of Philadelphia, Pennsylvania. Much of the character of Mammoth Falls, the fictional town where the Mad Scientists' adventures take place, was based on the town of West Newbury, Massachusetts, where Brinley lived during part of his youth and where he graduated from high school in 1935. West Newbury contributed a good many place names and several of the characters to the Mad Scientists' Club stories. His story "The Strange Sea Monster of Strawberry Lake" was made into a film called The Strange Monster of Strawberry Cove.

They have since been republished by Purple House Press in Cynthiana, Kentucky. Brinley's final work, The Big Chunk of Ice, was published posthumously in 2005 by Purple House Press with permission from his son, Sheridan Brinley.

== Writings ==
- Rocket Manual for Amateurs (1960, nonfiction)
- The Mad Scientists' Club (1965, juvenile)
- The New Adventures of the Mad Scientists' Club (1968, juvenile)
- The Big Kerplop! (1974, juvenile)
- The Big Chunk of Ice (2005, juvenile)

== See also ==
- Charles Geer (illustrator)
