= Prayer for a Child =

1944 children's picture book

- Front cover, designed by Elizabeth Orton Jones
- Author: Rachel Field
- Illustrator: Elizabeth Orton Jones
- Cover artist: Elizabeth Orton Jones
- Genre: Children's picture book
- Publisher: The Macmillan Company. Later published by Simon & Schuster Books for Young Readers
- Publication date: 1944
- Publication place: United States

Prayer for a Child is a 1944 book by Rachel Field. Its artwork by Elizabeth Orton Jones won it a Caldecott Medal in 1945. The whole book is narrated by a little girl, but it represents children as a whole. It reflects their love of God, and their gentleness to humankind as a whole.

== Critical reception ==
Prayer for a Child received positive reviews. Kirkus Reviews described it as "A beautiful piece of bookmaking". The New York Times said "The pictures and the prayer itself speak to a child in a child's language; older people will find this little volume beautiful, moving and deeply satisfying."

Awards
Preceded by Many Moons	Caldecott Medal recipient 1945	Succeeded by The Rooster Crows
