= Prime Suspect (film) =

- Directed by: Bruce Kimmel
- Produced by: Alain Silver; Patrick Regan
- Starring: Don Blakely; Tom Bresnahan; Ann Dane; Billy Drago; Robert F. Lyons; Susan Strasberg; Doug McClure; Michael Parks; Dana Plato
- Cinematography: Fernando Argüelles
- Edited by: Sergei Goncharoff
- Music by: Bruce Kimmel
- Release date: 1989
- Running time: 89 min.
- Country: United States
- Language: English

Prime Suspect is a 1989 American thriller directed by Bruce Kimmel (using the pseudonym Mark Rutland, as he was brought in after the original director (Thomas Constantinides) proved unequal to the task) and produced by Alain Silver and Patrick Regan. Bruce Kimmel also composed the underscore.

The film stars Don Blakely, Tom Bresnahan and Ann Dane.

Only 15 to 20 minutes of this 90 minute film remain of Constantinides' work. Kimmel was brought in on one day's notice and finished the film as a favor to his friends Alain Silver and Patrick Regan, with whom he had worked many times. The script was by Constantinides. The resulting film wasn't exactly poorly received, as it went straight to home video, and no reviews of it seem to exist. The story of all this is told in Kimmel's memoir, There's Mel, There's Woody, and There's You.

== Cast ==
- Don Blakely as Joey
- Tom Bresnahan as Tod Jennings
- Ann Dane as Nurse Barton
- Crisstyn Dante as Nurse Edgar
- Billy Drago as Cyril
- Suzanne Dunne as Reporter
- Robert Hoover as Janitor
- Tamara J. Hufford as Mrs. Masters
- Mark Keyloun as Sgt. Blaze
- Robert F. Lyons as Sheriff Hank Fallon
- Susan Strasberg as Dr. Celia Warren
- Doug McClure as Dr. Brand
- Michael Parks as Bill Nevins
- Dana Plato as Diana Masters
- Frank Stallone as Gene Chambers
