= The First Nudie Musical =

1976 film by Bruce Kimmel

- Directed by: Mark Haggard; Bruce Kimmel
- Written by: Bruce Kimmel
- Produced by: Jack Reeves
- Starring: Stephen Nathan; Cindy Williams; Bruce Kimmel; Alan Abelew; Leslie Ackerman; Diana Canova
- Cinematography: Douglas Knapp
- Edited by: Allen Peluso
- Music by: Bruce Kimmel
- Distributed by: Paramount Pictures
- Release date: March 3, 1976
- Running time: 97 min.
- Country: United States
- Language: English
- Budget: $200,000

The First Nudie Musical is a 1976 American musical comedy film directed by Mark Haggard and Bruce Kimmel, with a score by Kimmel. Kimmel costars alongside Stephen Nathan and Cindy Williams in a series of farcical lewd numbers spoofing the style of classic Hollywood musicals. Originally distributed by Paramount Pictures, it was picked up by World-Northal in 1977.

The film developed a cult following, aided by frequent broadcasts on Cinemax and home video releases.

Kimmel and Williams collaborated on the similar musical-comedy farce The Creature Wasn't Nice in 1981.

== Plot ==
Harry Schechter, heir to a failing Hollywood studio, attempts to stave off bankruptcy by producing a musical comedy porno. Songs include "Orgasm", "Lesbian Butch Dyke", and "Dancing Dildos." Ron Howard had a cameo as an actor at the casting call scene.

== Reception ==
The film was panned by Janet Maslin of The New York Times, who described the concept of the film as "a losing proposition" and found the music "tuneless." Arthur D. Murphy of Variety wrote, "A few clever bits are drowned in a larger sea of silliness, forced gags and predictable cliche." Gene Siskel of the Chicago Tribune gave the film half of one star out of four, calling it "juvenile" and "flaccid." Alan M. Kriegsman of The Washington Post panned the film for "crude photography, bad editing, sophomoric story and forgettable music."

Kevin Thomas of the Los Angeles Times was more positive, writing, "Silly, sophomoric, at times downright inept, this little low-budget venture picked up by Paramount is more often than not hilarious, offering good, tonic laughter to those not offended by nudity and blunt language." Leonard Maltin's film guide gave it two stars out of four and noted, "Basically a one-joke idea that wears thin despite an air of amiability."

The First Nudie Musical holds an 86% rating on Rotten Tomatoes based on seven reviews.
