= Claudio Castravelli =

Canadian motion picture producer

- Occupation: Producer
- Years active: 1971 - present

Claudio Castravelli is a Canadian motion picture producer. He is independently producing the Walter Hill directed crime thriller St. Vincent alongside Jon Turtle starring Pierce Brosnan, Billy Bob Thornton and Giovanni Ribisi. Walter Hill is noted as one of Hollywood's master action directors, lensing such modern action classics as 48 Hrs., The Long Riders, The Warriors and Broken Trail.

Castravelli has produced more than thirty feature films, over 200 hours of television programming, and has worked with many major Hollywood studios and television networks.

== Early life ==
Castravelli became involved in the film industry at an early age. His father was head technician for Pathé in Paris. Castravelli made his first screen appearance at the age of three in a Pathe promotional film. He has lived in France, Italy, Egypt, India and Australia; he chose to settle in Canada with his parents at the age of fifteen, where he has lived ever since.

== Education ==
Castravelli studied Science and Mathematics at McGill University before switching to Communication Arts at Sir George Williams University (now Concordia University). He completed his cinema studies at the Centro Sperimentale di Cinematografia in Rome, Italy where he had the opportunity to study under such illustrious filmmakers as Michelangelo Antonioni and Pier Paolo Pasolini. Castravelli's first professional film employment was as an assistant to the producer on Franco Zeffirelli's Brother Sun, Sister Moon.

== Career ==
Some of Castravelli's most notable production credits include:

"Undressed" 52 x 30 min. GLAAD award-winning series co-produced with Academy Award winner Roland Joffé (The Killing Fields, The Mission) in association with MTV Networks; "Hysteria", the Def Leppard story, the official bio-pic of the iconic British band (Viacom/MTV); "A Diva's Christmas Carol", starring Vanessa L. Williams, James Taylor and Rozonda "Chili" Thomas (Viacom/VH1); "Snow in August", which was co-produced with multiple Academy Award winner Jake Eberts (Driving Miss Daisy, A River Runs Through It)) and which garnered three nominations at the Emmy Awards for Best Director, Best Children's Special and Best Actor for Stephen Rea (Showtime); "Love Song" with Monica Arnold and Christian Kane (Viacom/MTV); "Time at the Top", starring Timothy Busfield and Elisha Cuthbert (Showtime/Hallmark) *Finalist at the Worldfest Houston (theatrical Feature Film Awards); "The Second Arrival", starring Patrick Muldoon, Michael Sarrazin and Jane Sibbett (HBO Premier); "The Minion", starring Dolph Lundgren (Buena Vista); "Provocateur", starring Jane March, Lilo Brancato and Cary Tagawa (Live Entertainment and Capella International); "Snowboard Academy", starring Brigitte Nielsen, Jim Varney, Joe Flaherty and Corey Haim (Columbia/Tri-Star); "Demon House", starring Amelia Kinkaide (Republic Pictures); "Silent Hunter", starring Miles O'Keeffe and Fred Williamson (New Line Cinema); "Equinox", starring Matthew Modine, Lara Flynn Boyle and Marisa Tomei (Columbia/Tri-Star). Video and TV releases include:

"Dangerous Dreams", "A Touch of Murder", "With Friends Like These", and the syndicated TV series "Unknown Dimensions" and "Dementia", as well as "Les Transistors" (a France/Canada co-production)

== Filmography ==
- "Undressed" (1999–2002) TV series
- Snow in August (2001) (TV)
- Hysteria – The Def Leppard Story (2001) (TV)
- A Diva's Christmas Carol (2000) (TV)
- Love Song (2000) (TV)
- Time at the Top (1999)
- The Second Arrival (1998) - aka Arrival II
- The Minion (1998) - aka Fallen Knight - Canada (English title)
- Provocateur (1998) - aka Agent provocateur - Canada (English title)
- Night of the Demons 3 (1997) - aka Demon Night - Canada (English title)
- Snowboard Academy (1996)
- Silent Hunter (1995)
- Equinox (1992)
- With Friends Like These... (1991)
- You're Driving Me Crazy (1990) (as Claude Castravelli)
- A Touch of Murder (1990) (as Claude Castravelli)
- The Scorpio Factor (1990)
- Evil Judgment (1984) (as Claude Castravelli)
- Deux super-dingues (1982) (as Claude Castravelli)
- Les jeunes Québécoises (1980) (as Claude Castravelli) - aka "The Young Quebecers" - Canada (English title)
- Up Uranus! (1971) (as Claude Castravelli)
