= Gladys Lucy Adshead =

British-born writer of children's books (1896–1985)

Gladys Adshead
- Born: April 25, 1896; Manchester, England
- Died: 1985 (aged 88–89); Alameda County, California
- Education: Froebel Educational Institute
- Occupations: Teacher, headmistress, author
- Writing career
- Genre: Children's books
- Notable works: Brownies-Hush! Brownies – It's Christmas! Smallest Brownie's fearful adventure Brownies, They're Moving! Smallest Brownie and the flying squirrel

Gladys Lucy Adshead (April 25, 1896 – 1985) was a British-born teacher, headmistress, and writer of children's books, known for her "Brownie" books, including Brownies-Hush! (1938), Brownies – It's Christmas! (1955), Smallest Brownie's fearful adventure (1961), Brownies, They're Moving! (1970), and Smallest Brownie and the flying squirrel (1972).

== Biography ==
Adshead was born in Manchester, England, to James Frederick and Bertha Wilson Groome Adshead. She was educated at Froebel Educational Institute, a teacher training college. She became a teacher and headmistress in private schools in England, where she was a member of the Royal Society of Teachers, and later in Maryland, Massachusetts, and Illinois in the United States.

Gladys Adshead was best known for her "Brownie" books, the first of which was published in 1938 by Oxford University Press and entitled Brownies – Hush! and illustrated by Elizabeth Orton Jones. Jones also illustrated Adshead's 1945 book What Miranda Knew.

In 1947, Adshead collaborated with George H. Shapiro, with her writing the lyrics and Shapiro writing the music for songs in Seventeen to Sing. She worked with Annis Duff to assemble poems for children in a collection called An Inheritance of Poetry; the book was one of fourteen noted as distinguished books in 1948 by the Children's Library Association.

She died in Alameda County, California in 1985.

== Selected works ==
- Adshead, Gladys L. (1938). Brownies – hush!. Elizabeth Orton Jones. New York: H.Z. Walck. ISBN 0-8098-1003-4. OCLC 1058000.
- Adshead, Gladys L. (1939). Something Surprising. Oxford University Press.
- Adshead, Gladys L. (1943). Casco. Oxford University Press.
- Adshead, Gladys L. (1955). Brownies – It's Christmas!. Henry Z. Walck, Inc.
- Adshead, Gladys L. (1961). Smallest Brownie's fearful adventure. H. Z. Walck.
- Adshead, Gladys L. (1970). Brownies, They're Moving!. H. Z. Walck.
- Adshead, Gladys L. (1972). Smallest Brownie and the flying squirrel. H. Z. Walck.

== See also ==
- Brownie (folklore)

== Bibliography ==
- Commire, Anne. Something About the Author, Volume 3. Gale Research 1972
