= Alain Silver =

American film producer

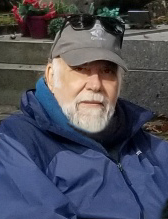
- On location in Paris, Winter 2019
- Education: University of California, Los Angeles, B.A., Theater Arts/Motion Pictures--Production, 1969; M.A. 1973 and Ph.D. 1976 in Theater Arts/Motion Pictures--Critical Studies.
- Occupations: Film screenwriter, producer, director, historian, commentator, production manager, assistant director
- Years active: 1977–present
- Spouse: Linda Brookover
- Website: alainsilver.com

Alain Silver is an American film producer, director, and screenwriter; music producer; film critic, film historian, DVD commentator, author and editor of books and essays on film topics, especially film noir, the samurai film, and horror films. Filmmakers about whom he has written include David Lean, Robert Aldrich, Raymond Chandler, Roger Corman, and James Wong Howe.

== Career ==
=== Education and Affiliations ===
Silver graduated from UCLA with degrees in film production (B.A.) and critical studies (M.A. and PhD).

He is a longtime member of the Writers Guild of America, the Directors Guild of America, and the Screen Actors Guild/American Federation of Radio and Television Artists.

=== Film Writing and Production ===
Silver entered the film industry through the Assistant Directors Training Program and was a trainee, second assistant and first assistant director on movies such as Every Which Way But Loose, The Manitou, and The Bad News Bears in Breaking Training and on television series such as Police Woman, Angie, Mork and Mindy and Laverne and Shirley. In 1981, Silver began working as a production manager and producer. Since that time Silver has been executive, development, or supervising producer on a number of movies such as The Creature Wasn't Nice, Prince Jack, The Ratings Game, Mortuary Academy, Hold Me, Thrill Me, Kiss Me, The Quickie, 10th & Wolf, The Kings of Appletown, The 7, Dead for a Dollar, and Lars Shrike Walks The Night. With Linda Brookover he co-wrote and was Executive Producer of the Showtime family feature Time at the Top. Silver has also produced sixteen independent features, including Kiss Daddy Goodbye, Prime Suspect, Night Visitor, Cyborg 2, Beat, The Creature of the Sunny Side Up Trailer Park, Crashing, Changing the Game, Sacred Blood (which he also wrote), Radio Mary, and Torch as well documentaries, music videos, and segments for the TV reality series America's Most Wanted and I Survived!. He wrote and directed the short films A Fish in the Desert (2002) and Texas Vampire Massacre (2004) and the narrative features White Nights (adapted from Dostoyevsky, 2005) and Nightcomer (aka Blood Cure, 2013).

Silver has given lectures on production and appeared on and moderated panels for the Directors Guild of America, Writers Guild of America, West and at various festival venues such as the Slamdance Film Festival and Cinequest Film Festival.

=== Critical Writing ===
Silver has written and edited more than thirty books, mostly with James Ursini or Elizabeth Ward, including Film Noir Fatal Women; The Noir Style; The Samurai Film; Film Noir the Encyclopedia; Raymond Chandler's Los Angeles; Film Noir Readers 1, 2, 3 and 4; Film Noir Graphics: Where Danger Lives; Film Noir Compendium; Film Noir Light and Shadow; Film Noir Prototypes; L.A. Noir: the City as Character; Gangster Film Reader; Horror Film Reader; Film Noir the Directors; David Lean and his Films; What Ever Happened to Robert Aldrich; More Things than Are Dreamt Of; The Vampire Film; Roger Corman: Metaphysics on a Shoestring; James Wong Howe: The Camera Eye; Steve McQueen, Frank Sinatra, Sean Connery and Katharine Hepburn for the Taschen Icon series; The Film Director's Team; Film Budgeting; and Movies Without Baggage. Silver has also written numerous articles on Raymond Chandler, samurai cinema, film noir, vampire films, and other topics on film history and production. He has provided audio and video commentary on the DVD titles listed below. He has done film noir visual presentations on the long take, Billy Wilder and Double Indemnity, and visual style for Hillsdale College and "A Noir Tour of L.A." at the Los Angeles Film Festival. In 2024 From the Moment They Met It Was Murder, Double Indemnity and the Rise of Film Noir (Running Press/Hachette) was published as a TCM book. Forthcoming in 2026 are The Films of David Lean (3rd edition) and a fifth edition of Film Noir The Encyclopedia.

He has also produced more than fifty soundtrack albums for Citadel Records and Bay Cities Music.

=== List of audio commentaries ===
- The Big Heat, with film historian James Ursini
- Boomerang, with James Ursini
- Brute Force, with James Ursini
- Burn!, with James Ursini
- Call Northside 777, with James Ursini
- Crossfire, with James Ursini
- Dark Blue, with James Ursini
- The Dark Corner, with James Ursini
- The Dirty Dozen, with James Ursini
- The Egyptian, with James Ursini
- Hanna K., with James Ursini
- He Walked by Night. with James Ursini
- Hobson's Choice, with James Ursini
- House of Bamboo, with James Ursini
- Hustle, with James Ursini
- Internal Affairs, with James Ursini
- Invisible Stripes, with James Ursini
- Johnny Handsome, with James Ursini
- Joyride, with filmmaker Christopher Coppola
- Kiss Me Deadly, with James Ursini
- Kiss of Death, with James Ursini
- Lady in the Lake, with James Ursini
- Liebestraum, with Christopher Coppola
- The Lodger, with James Ursini
- The Long Voyage Home, with James Ursini
- The Longest Yard, with James Ursini
- Madeleine, with James Ursini
- Murder, My Sweet
- Mystery Street, with film historian Elizabeth Ward
- Nightmare Alley, with James Ursini
- One of Our Aircraft Is Missing, with James Ursini
- Panic in the Streets, with James Ursini
- The Passionate Friends, with James Ursini
- Red Rock West, with Christopher Coppola
- Ride the Pink Horse, with James Ursini
- The River's Edge, with James Ursini
- Smart Money, with James Ursini
- The Sound Barrier, with James Ursini
- The Street with No Name, with James Ursini
- Summertime, with James Ursini
- Tales of Hoffmann, with James Ursini
- Tension, with Elizabeth Ward and actress Audrey Totter
- Thieves' Highway
- Twilight, with James Ursini
- Up Tight!, with James Ursini
- The Wayward Bus, with James Ursini
- Where Danger Lives, with James Ursini
- The Woman Chaser, with Christopher Coppola
