= David and the Phoenix =

Book by Edward Ormondroyd

- 1958 edition
- Author: Edward Ormondroyd
- Illustrator: Joan Raysor
- Cover artist: Raysor
- Genre: Children's fantasy novel, adventure fiction, humor
- Publisher: Follett Publishing Company
- Publication date: October 1, 1957
- Publication place: United States
- Media type: Print (hardcover), audiobook (2002)
- Pages: 173 pp
- ISBN: 1-930900-00-7 (2000 hardcover ed.)
- LC Class: PZ8.O7 Dav; PZ7.O635 Dav 2000

David and the Phoenix is a 1957 children's novel about a young boy's adventures with a phoenix. It was the first published book by American children's writer Edward Ormondroyd.

== Premise ==
The story focuses on the friendship between the protagonist, David, and the phoenix. David is taught the ways of the mythical world.

== Contents by Chapter heading ==
- 1: In Which David Goes Mountain Climbing, and a Mysterious Voice is Overheard
- 2: In Which David Meets the Phoenix, and There is a Change of Plans
- 3: In Which It Is Decided That David Should Have an Education, and an Experiment is made.
- 4: In Which David and the Phoenix Go To Visit the Gryffins, and a Great Danger is Narrowly Averted
- 5: In Which the Scientist Arrives in Pursuit of the Phoenix, and There Are Alarums and Excursions by Night
- 6: In Which the Phoenix Has a Plan, and David and the Phoenix Call on a Sea Monster
- 7: In Which the Phoenix's Plan is Carried Out, and There Are More Alarums and Excursions in the Night
- 8: In Which David and the Phoenix Visit a Banshee, and a Surprise is Planted the in Enemie's Camp
- 9: In Which David and the Phoenix Call on a Faun, and a Lovely Afternoon Comes to a Strange End
- 10: In Which a Five Hundredth Anniversary is Celebrated, and the Phoenix Bows to Tradition

== Plot summary ==
David and the Phoenix visited by a witch

David moves to a new house at the base of some beautiful mountains. The next day, rather than settle into the new house, he decides to climb the mountains. Upon reaching the summit, he encounters the Phoenix. They are, at first, frightened of each other, as the Phoenix had been chased by a scientist for several weeks and David had, of course, never seen anything like the Phoenix before. The Phoenix is flattered by David's attentions, though, and decides to educate David about the legendary creatures in the world.

The first adventure in the Phoenix's curriculum for David involves seeing the Gryffins. They first meet a witch who goads the Phoenix into a race. They are captured by the arrogant Gryffons, who sentence the Phoenix to death for bringing humans into their magic world.

They escape, and the Phoenix keeps his appointment with the witch. David returns home to meet the unpleasant scientist visiting his parents. The two friends implement plans to avoid the scientist, firstly by finding some buried treasure with the help of a gruff but friendly sea monster, and spending the gold coins on magic items to foil the scientist's plot to capture the rare bird.

While visiting the magical world to buy necessities, David has a brief adventure with a prankster Leprechaun, meets a cantankerous potion-selling hag, and a faun. The Phoenix rescues David from remaining too long in this world, which could absorb those beings who are not magical.

The Phoenix and David sabotage the scientist's equipment and frighten him into leaving town. The old Phoenix celebrates his 500th birthday, and soon reveals he must "bow to tradition," and build himself a pyre of cinnamon logs. David tearfully complies with his friend's wishes, buying the necessary items from town.

The Scientist shows up and follows David up the mountain trails. The Phoenix is reborn, but as a hatchling, does not yet comprehend its peril. David appeals to the young Phoenix, who dimly recognizes a friend, and flies away to avoid capture. David watches as the old Phoenix's feather changes from blue to gold.

== Characters ==
- David – the protagonist, full of curiosity. He begins the story fascinated by the mountain and learns much about life from his adventures with the Phoenix.
- The Phoenix – a mythical bird with a steak of arrogance. The Phoenix is wise and cares about David.
- Scientist – The antagonist, seeks to kill the Phoenix and take it as a specimen.

== Publication Background ==
Ormondroyd attended UC Berkeley on the G.I. Bill, taking a Bachelor's degree in English and a masters in Library Science (MLIS). Adopting a largely bohemian lifestyle with his roommates, Ormondroyd remembered his college years as "one of the happiest times of my life."

After graduating, Ormondroyd was disinclined to pursue a career in academia, preferring to seek various blue-collar jobs. Describing his employment history as "hopelessly mixed in my memory" Ormondroyd worked for a number of industrial enterprises, including a paper processing plant in the Berkeley area, as well as an able-bodied seaman on oil tankers that serviced operations in Alaska and Hawaii. Living in the Berkeley area, Ormondroyd briefly clerked in a bookstore and was "writing not-very-good stories and keeping a journal...It will be no surprise that after library school [MSL] I got a job as a librarian."

Ormondroyd's literary magnum opus emerged at college, where he first conceived the plot and characters for David and the Phoenix. Ormondroyd reports that "I'm still surprised that it happened. It was as if the choice made me, rather than the other way around."

=== Chef-d'œuvre: David and the Phoenix ===
The origins and inspiration for his fantasy character the Phoenix were recalled by Ormandroyd in 2011:

I was walking on the UC Berkeley campus when a vision flashed in my mind of a large bird hurling itself out of an upstairs window and becoming entangled in a rose arbor below. It's a complete mystery to me where that came from.

Ormondroyd, familiar with the Legend of the Phoenix. attributes his "vision" to a number of literary influences, among them T. H. White's adventure The Sword in the Stone (1938), while the personality of the Phoenix may have had its origin in the "pompous" Major Hoople, featured in the newspaper cartoon Our Boarding House. David's adventurous travels perched on the mythical bird's back were drawn from The Wonderful Adventures of Nils (1907) by Selma Lagerlöf.

Ormondroyd admits that he never documented the precise chronology of his "seven-year" effort writing David and the Phoenix, from its inception in college to its publication by the Follett Publishing Company in 1957, which entailed numerous rejections by publishers, Follett among them initially. During these years, Ormondroyd subsisted in part on his stipend provided under the GI bill.

His agent and editor Muriel Fuller coached Ormondroyd in writing a "leaner" and "better" version of the book.

David and the Phoenix reached a wide audience when it was included in Weekly Reader Book Club and was awarded the silver medal for best juvenile story of 1957.

== Developments ==
This book enjoyed a resurgence of popularity early in the 2000s in the wake of Harry Potter and the filming of Roald Dahl novels. As of October 2005, there had been negotiations between the author and a private animation-film company to produce a feature-length "David and the Phoenix" screen adaptation.

In 2002 Full Cast Audio released an unabridged (Note: According to the 2007 Playaway edition, "This recording is unabridged except for the deletion of some attributives (he said, she said, etc) made unnecessary by having a full cast. Not one single sentence has been omitted.") recording of the novel read by a cast of ten actors and Ormondroyd as the narrator. The production was hailed by AudioFile magazine, which said, "Every line of the book's warmth, humor, and gentleness comes to life in [Full Cast founder] Bruce Coville's superb multicast production."

== Trivia ==
A 1967 Dark Shadows storyline featuring Laura Collins (Diana Millay), apparently a woman, but in actuality a phoenix, who tries to lay claim to a nine-year-old boy named David. Fans had speculated that this might have been inspired by the book. To date, it is unknown if writer Malcolm Marmorstein publicly addressed this.

David Weber used the book as a recurring motif in the Honor Harrington novel At All Costs (2005), with a brief footnote about his own childhood love for the book. The original cover of At All Costs shows Honor Harrington reading from David and the Phoenix to her infant son Raoul. Weber's 2010 novel Out of the Dark also mentions the book as a favorite of one of the main characters' children.

In 2024, the book was translated into Latin by Robert G. Natelson and published by Thinklings books under the title David et Phoenix.

== Release details ==
- 1957, US, Follett Publishing Company (ISBN 1-153-80845-5), October 1, 1957, hardcover
- 1958, US, Follett, Weekly Reader Children's Book Club edition

At Project Gutenberg: index; title page verso (v of viii+173+2); final image.

- 1981, US, Scholastic Paperbacks (ISBN 0-590-31276-6), June 1981, paperback
- 2000, US, Purple House Press (ISBN 1-930900-00-7), September 2000, hardback
- 2001, US, Purple House Press (ISBN 1-930900-01-5), January 2001, paperback
- 2001, US, Purple House Press (ISBN 1-930900-13-9), July 2001, hardcover
- 2002, US, Full Cast Audio, unabridged recording

2007, Playaway edition (playawaydigital.com) of the Full Cast Audio production (ISBN 1-60252-525-0), May 2007

- Year unknown, US, Scholastic Paperbacks (ISBN 0-590-72122-4), paperback
- 2024, US, David et Phoenix (Latin Edition), Thinklings Books, (ISBN 1-951471-17-2), October 2024, paperback; and (ISBN 1-951471-19-9), October 2024, hardcover
- 2024, US, Thinklings Books (ISBN 1-951471-18-0), December 2024, paperback
