= The Creature Wasn't Nice =

- Directed by: Bruce Kimmel
- Written by: Bruce Kimmel
- Produced by: Mark Haggard; Eilhys England; Michael S. Landes; Albert Schwartz; Alain Silver; Patrick Regan
- Starring: Cindy Williams; Bruce Kimmel; Leslie Nielsen; Gerrit Graham; Patrick Macnee
- Cinematography: Denny Lavil
- Edited by: David Blangsted
- Music by: David Spear
- Distributed by: Almi Pictures (VHS)
- Release date: October 23, 1981; (Los Angeles)
- Running time: 76 min. (85 min. Director's Cut)
- Country: United States
- Language: English
- Budget: $2 million

The Creature Wasn't Nice (also known as Spaceship and Naked Space) is a 1981 American comedy film written and directed by Bruce Kimmel. A parody of Alien, it stars Leslie Nielsen in a role similar to those in the farcical comedies Airplane! and Naked Gun, alongside co-stars Cindy Williams, Gerrit Graham and Patrick Macnee. It was released on VHS in 1984 under the title Spaceship, to emphasize Nielsen's connection to Airplane!, and on DVD in 1999 under the title Naked Space, to play up the connection to Nielsen's Naked Gun films.

Limitet release in 1981. Wide US-releas in 1983.

The film is a low-budget comedy with simple sets and dialogue wrapped around several musical numbers. In one of the scenes, the red slimy one-eyed alien monster performs a lounge-style musical number called "I Want to Eat Your Face." Williams performs two musical numbers, one solo and one with Kimmel, who in 1976 had appeared with and directed her in The First Nudie Musical. The film was completely re-edited by the producers, creating the version released as Spaceship and Naked Space on home video. The original cut, The Creature Wasn't Nice, was only seen at two public previews. In 2019, it was announced that both versions of the film would come to home video under its original title.

== Plot ==
Crew members of the spaceship Vertigo have a confrontation with a man-eating alien creature.

== Cast ==
- Cindy Williams - Annie McHugh
- Bruce Kimmel - John
- Leslie Nielsen - Captain Jamieson
- Gerrit Graham - Rodzinski
- Patrick Macnee - Dr Stark
- Paul Brinegar - Clint Eastwood/Dirty Harry
- Cheri Eichen - TV Host #1
- Ron Kurowski - The Creature
- Broderick Crawford - voice of Max the Computer (uncredited) (Crawford's voice doesn't feature in Spaceship/Naked Space - it was replaced.)

== Production ==
Bruce Kimmel came up with the idea for the film in 1979 and successfully pitched it to Cindy Williams, with whom he'd worked on The First Nudie Musical. Kimmel based the film on his love of 1950s B-movie sci-fi films such as Target Earth, Tobor the Great and The Angry Red Planet, as well as his distaste for the more extreme horror films that had risen in popularity, such as Friday the 13th and The Texas Chain Saw Massacre, calling them "evil" and "despicable" films.

Al Schwartz of World Northal Corp (who'd released The First Nudie Musical) optioned the project as his first in-house production, previously having specialized in distributing European films such as Bread and Chocolate and Cousin Cousine. The film's special effects were handled by Magic Lantern Organization, which had also worked on History of the World, Part I and Flicks.

== Release ==
Filmed and completed in 1981, The Creature Wasn't Nice was practically yanked from Kimmel's hands, reedited and retitled as Spaceship (to hopefully bank off the success of Airplane! which also starred Leslie Nielsen) and given a one week theatrical engagement in June 1983. It then rapidly made its way to pay cable television, followed shortly after with a home video release distributed by Vestron Video.

In 1994, independent home video distributor Palm Beach Entertainment released The Creature Wasn't Nice on VHS under the title Naked Space (again to hopefully bank off Leslie Nielsen's popular Naked Gun franchise). Palm Beach also released a DVD in 1999. Since then, Naked Space has seen several DVD releases from cheap budgeted home video distributors in very poor quality.

== Director's Cut ==
In 2019, Bruce Kimmel released an Original Director's Cut DVD sold exclusively through Kritzerland.com. The original cut was sourced from Kimmel's personal U-matic videotape of his original answer print.

== Running Time ==
Interestingly, the actual running time has been mislabeled on practically every home video release of Spaceship / Naked Space since 1984. While the Vestron VHS and Beta suggest 88 minutes, and Palm Beach's VHS and DVD claim 91 minutes, the film legitimately runs approximately 76 minutes. However, Kimmel's Director's Cut is 85 minutes.

== Reception ==
TV Guide gave the film one out of four stars, calling it a "misguided attempt at horror comedy". Cavett Binion, writing for AllMovie, also reviewing the re-cut version, called the film "painfully dull [...] [Patrick Macnee's] hammy performance provides one of the film's few real laughs [...] the lovely soft-shoe number "I Want to Eat Your Face" [provides] the film's other real laugh." Variety reviewed the film under its original title at a public sneak preview in Westwood, calling it "a likeably silly send-up of outer-space horror pix like 'Alien'".
