= Rachel Field =

American novelist and poet (1894–1942)

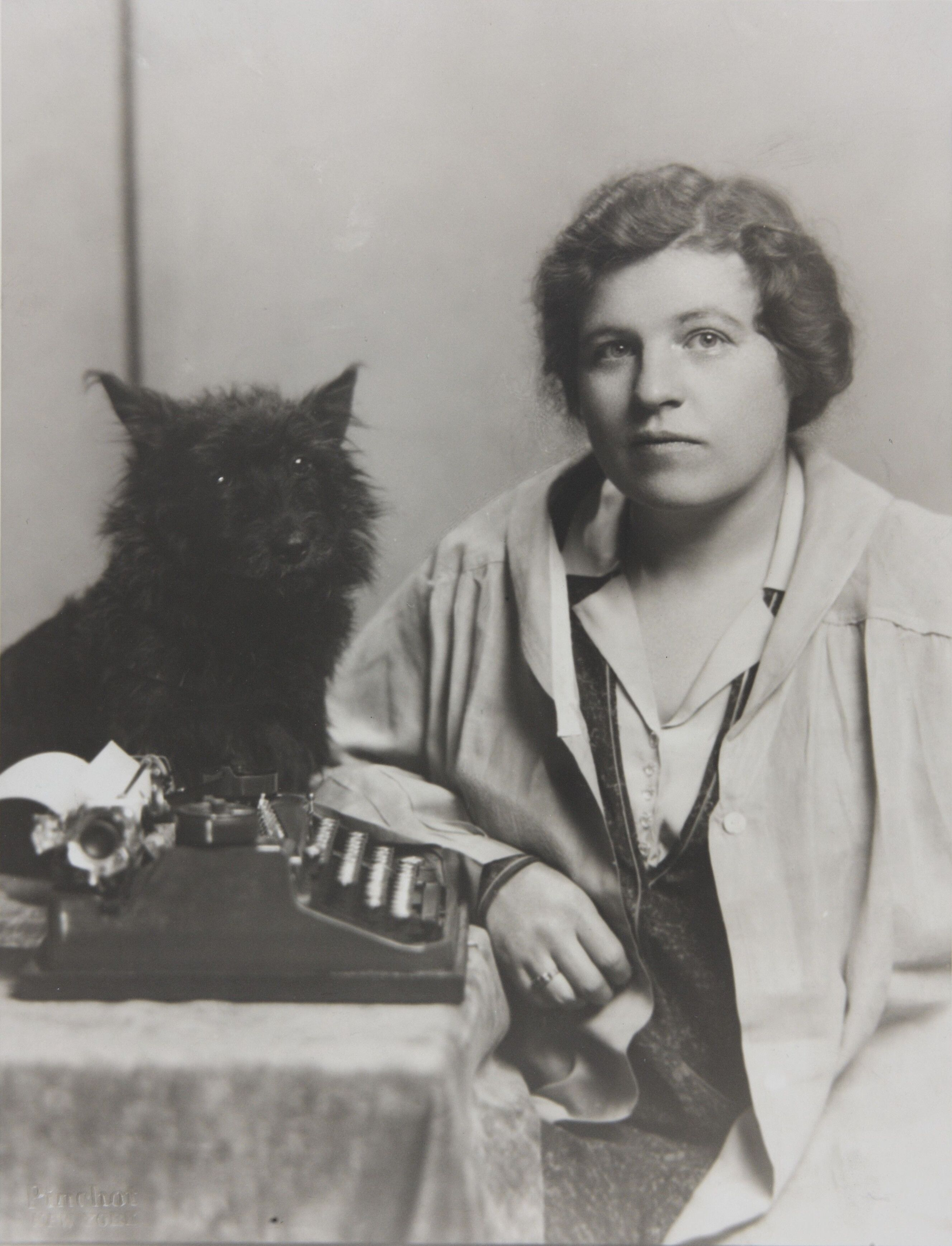
- Born: September 19, 1894; New York City, U.S.
- Died: March 15, 1942 (aged 47); Los Angeles, California, U.S.
- Education: Radcliffe College
- Occupation: Writer
- Spouse: Arthur S. Pederson (m. 1935)
- Children: 1
- Writing career
- Period: 1924–1944
- Genres: Drama, poetry, novels, children's fiction
- Notable works: Hitty, Her First Hundred Years; Time Out of Mind; All This and Heaven, too; Something Told the Wild Geese
- Notable awards: Newbery Award 1930; National Book Award 1935

Rachel Lyman Field (September 19, 1894 – March 15, 1942) was an American novelist, poet, and children's fiction writer. She is best known for her work Hitty, Her First Hundred Years. Field also won a National Book Award, a Newbery Honor award and two of her books are on the Lewis Carroll Shelf Award list.

== Life ==
Field was a descendant of David Dudley Field, the early New England clergyman and writer. She grew up in Stockbridge, Massachusetts. Her first published work was an essay entitled "A Winter Walk" printed in St. Nicholas Magazine when she was 16. She was educated at Radcliffe College where she studied writing under George Pierce Baker.

According to Ruth Hill Viguers, Field was "fifteen when she first visited Maine and fell under the spell of its 'island-scattered coast'. Calico Bush [1931] still stands out as a near-perfect re-creation of people and place in a story of courage, understated and beautiful."

Field married Arthur S. Pederson in 1935, with whom she collaborated in 1937 on To See Ourselves. In 1938, one of her plays was adapted for the British film The Londonderry Air. She was also successful as an author of adult fiction, writing the bestsellers Time Out of Mind (1935), All This and Heaven Too (1938), and And Now Tomorrow (1942). Field also wrote the English lyrics for the version of Franz Schubert's "Ave Maria" used in the Disney film Fantasia (1940).

She moved to Hollywood, where she lived with her husband and daughter.

Rachel Field died at the Good Samaritan Hospital on March 15, 1942, of pneumonia following an operation.

== Awards ==
Hitty, Her First Hundred Years received the Newbery Award in 1930, for the year's "most distinguished contribution to American literature for children." As a publicity stunt, Field was informed of her win via radio by a group of librarians and ALA President Milton J. Ferguson who were flying in a second plane as Field flew from New Mexico to Los Angeles.

The 1944 (posthumous) Prayer for a Child, with a story by Field and illustrations by Elizabeth Orton Jones, won the Caldecott Medal recognizing the year's "most distinguished picture book for children" published in the U.S.

Hitty and Prayer for a Child were both named to the Lewis Carroll Shelf Award list of books deemed to belong "on the same bookshelf" with Carroll's Alice. Prayer for a Child was one of the seventeen inaugural selections in 1958, which were originally published 1893 to 1957. Hitty was added in 1961.

Time Out of Mind won one of the inaugural National Book Awards as the Most Distinguished Novel of 1935, voted by the American Booksellers Association.

== Adaptation of works into other media ==
The novel And Now Tomorrow (1942) was adapted into the 1944 film And Now Tomorrow by Irving Pichel.

Prayer for a Child (1944) was the lyrics for the song A Child's Prayer (1955), which was written for a three-part chorus of women's voices with piano accompaniment. The music was by Gustav Klemm and the arrangement was by Rudolph Schirmer. As mentioned in this article, Field had written the lyrics for one of the songs in the 1940 film Fantasia.

== Selected works ==
- 1924, The Pointed People, poetry
- 1924, Cinderella Married, A Comedy in One Act, drama
- 1924, Six Plays, drama
- 1926, Taxis and Toadstools, poetry
- 1926, Eliza and the Elves, fiction
- 1926, An Alphabet for Boys and Girls, poetry
- 1927, The Magic Pawnshop, fiction
- 1927, The Cross-Stitch Heart And Other One-Act Plays, drama
- 1928, Little Dog Toby, fiction
- 1929, Hitty, Her First Hundred Years, fiction—winner of the 1930 Newbery Medal
- 1930, A Circus Garland: Poems, poetry
- 1931, Calico Bush, fiction
- 1931, The Bad Penny: A Drama in One Act, drama
- 1932, Hepatica Hawks, fiction (translated into German by Annemarie Böll "Die Tochter des Riesen")
- 1933, Just Across the Street, fiction
- 1934, Branches Green, poetry (including "Something Told the Wild Geese")
- 1934, Susanna B And William C, fiction
- 1934, God's Pocket, historical non-fiction
- 1935, Time Out Of Mind, fiction
- 1936, Fear Is the Thorn, poetry
- 1936, First Class Matter: A Comedy in One Act, drama
- 1937, To See Ourselves, by Field and her husband Arthur Pederson, fiction
- 1938, All This and Heaven Too, based on the true story of Field's great-aunt, Henriette Deluzy-Desportes, and made into a movie, All This, and Heaven Too, in 1940.
- 1938(?), The Londonderry Air, drama; produced as a film, The Londonderry Air (1938)
- 1940(?), "Ave Maria" lyrics for the film Fantasia (1940)
- 1940, All Through the Night, nativity story
- 1942, And Now Tomorrow, fiction
- 1944, Prayer for a Child, fiction, picture book illustrated by Elizabeth Orton Jones—winner of the 1945 Caldecott Medal

== See also ==
Awards
Preceded by Eric P. Kelly	Newbery Medal winner 1930	Succeeded by Elizabeth Coatsworth
