= Elizabeth Orton Jones =

American illustrator and writer

Elizabeth Orton Jones (June 25, 1910 – May 10, 2005) was an American illustrator and writer of children's books. She won the 1945 Caldecott Medal for U.S. picture book illustration, recognizing Prayer for a Child, after being a runner-up one year earlier.

== Life ==
=== Early life ===
She was born "half past Christmas" in Highland Park, Illinois, to George Roberts Jones, a violinist, and Jessie May Orton, a pianist and a writer. Jones was followed by a brother and a sister. During her youth, two Bohemian girls served as cook and nurse in her home, providing exposure to an alternative set of cultural norms. She describes the household as one which was welcoming to many nationalities and races, and she experienced influence from several cultures.

During Jones' youth, she and her siblings made many creative outlets for their imagination. Her parents provided designated times for silence to encourage creativity and engagement with the arts. Setting up "tasks" for herself, she taught lessons to her dolls and eventually read the entire Bible. A more collaborative project between her and her siblings was the creation of the "Beagle Language", named after one of their pets.

Jones' great-grandfather, Joseph Russell Jones, a friend of Abraham Lincoln, was minister to Belgium under President Ulysses S. Grant. Her grandmother was a professional pianist and her grandfather owned a bookstore.

=== Education ===
Jones won the "Silver Cup for English Composition" at her high school, the House in the Pines. In 1932, Jones received her Ph.B. from the University of Chicago. Afterward she spent time in France, studying at the École des Beaux Arts in Fontainebleau, receiving a diploma in the same year, then studying in Paris at the Académie Colarossi and under the artist Camille Liausu. Upon returning, she presented at the Smithsonian Institution a solo display of color etchings of French children which she called the "Four Seasons". She also spent time studying at the School of the Art Institute of Chicago.

=== Professional life and work ===
After Paris, Jones began writing and illustrating her first book, Ragman of Paris and His Ragamuffins (1937), which was based on her experiences in France. Other books followed and evidenced her experiences as well: Maninka's Children was influenced by the Bohemian girls she knew growing up. Her home in Mason, New Hampshire, served as the model for her illustrations in a 1948 version of Little Red Riding Hood published by Little Golden Books. Her book Big Susan reflected her love of dolls.

Her work was very much influenced by the editions of Horn Book Magazine that she got. Her friend Bertha Mahony Miller, an editor of Horn Book, would frequently call from seventeen miles away with ideas for Jones to write about.

One of her illustrated books, Small Rain: Verses from the Bible, was named a Caldecott Honor Book in 1944 and another, Prayer for a Child (story by Rachel Field), won the Caldecott Medal in 1945, recognizing the year's "most distinguished picture book for children" published in the United States.

A watercolor from 1936 is in the collection of the National Gallery of Art as part of the Index of American Design.

In her Caldecott acceptance speech, she said:

Drawing is very like a prayer. Drawing is a reaching for something away beyond you. As you sit down to work in the morning, you feel as if you were on top of a hill. And it is as if you were seeing for the first time. You take your pencil in hand. You'd like to draw what you see. And so you begin. You try ... . Every child in the world has a hill, with a top to it. Every child-black, white, rich, poor, handicapped, unhandicapped. And singing is what the top of each hill is for. Singing-drawing-thinking-dreaming-sitting in silence ... saying a prayer. I should like every child in the world to know that he has a hill, that that hill is his no matter what happens, his and his only, forever.

=== Later life ===
In 1945 Jones visited New Hampshire for a business trip. The picturesque landscape caught her imagination, and she moved to Mason soon afterward. Jones became a well-respected figure in Mason, as she served to collect and preserve the history of the town in Mason Bicentennial, 1768-1968 a book she edited. She was known there, not by her given name, but by the nickname "Twig", the title character from one of her books.

Jones supported the children's theater, Andy's Summer Playhouse. For the last 40 years of her life, she offered artistic advice and guidance to the children in the community who participated in the Playhouse.

She died on May 10, 2005, at the Monadnock Community Hospital in Peterborough, New Hampshire, of a brief illness. On June 25, 2005, the Mason Public Library renamed its Junior Room the "Twig Room" in her honor; a scrapbook of Twig memorabilia is available there.

Perhaps one of "Twig's" most enduring accomplishments was her adamant support of a local summer children's theater, known as Andy's Summer Playhouse.

== Works ==
=== Written and illustrated ===
- Ragman of Paris and His Ragamuffins, Oxford University Press, 1937.
- Ragman of Paris and Ragamuffins, Robert Hale London WC1, undated.
- Minnie the Mermaid (with Thomas Orton Jones), Oxford University Press, 1939.
- Maminka’s Children, Macmillan, 1940, reissued, 1968.
- Twig, Macmillan, 1942, reissued, 1966. Purple House Press, 2002.
- Big Susan, Macmillan, 1947, reissued, 1967. Purple House Press, 2002.
- Little Red Riding Hood (reteller), Simon & Schuster, 1948.
- How Far Is It to Bethlehem?, Horn Book, 1955.

=== Children's books illustrated ===
- Bible, David, Macmillan, 1937.
- Adshead, Gladys L., Brownies—Hush!, Oxford University Press, 1938, reissued, Walck, 1966.
- Meigs, Cornelia Lynde, Scarlet Oak, Macmillan, 1938.
- Association for Childhood Education, Told under the Magic Umbrella: Modern Fanciful Stories for Young Children, Macmillan, 1939, reissued, 1967.
- Hunt, Mabel Leigh, Peddler’s Clock, Grosset, 1943.
- Jones, Jessie Mae, editor, Small Rain: Verses from the Bible, Viking, 1943, reissued, 1974.
- Field, Rachel, Prayer for a Child, Macmillan, 1944, reissued, 1973.
- Adshead, Gladys L., What Miranda Knew, New York, Oxford University Press, 1944.
- Farjeon, Eleanor, Prayer for Little Things, Houghton, 1945.
- Jones, Jessie Orton, Secrets, New York, Viking, 1945.
- Jones, Jessie Mae, Little Child—The Christmas Miracle Told in Bible Verses, New York, Viking, 1946.
- Jones, Jessie Mae, editor, This Is the Way: Prayers and Precepts from World Religions, Viking, 1951.
- St. Francis of Assisi, Song of the Sun, Macmillan, 1952.
- Thurman, Howard, Deep River, Harper, 1955.
- Bridgman, Elizabeth, Lullaby for Eggs, Macmillan, 1955.
- Trent, Robbie, To Church We Go, Follett, 1956.
