= Twiggy (disambiguation) =

Twiggy (born 1949) is a British model, actress, and singer.

Twiggy may also refer to:

== Arts and media ==
=== Music ===
- Twiggy (album)
- "Twiggy Twiggy", song by Japanese pop group Pizzicato Five

=== Other uses in arts and media ===
- Twiggy (film) (original title "La Brindille"), a 2011 French drama film directed by Emmanuelle Millet
- Twiggy (Powerpuff Girls), a fictional pet hamster
- Twiggy the Water-Skiing Squirrel, an animal novelty act
- Twiggy, a fictional forest gnome rogue guest character in the D&D Web Series Critical Role
- Twiggy, a character in the British comedy series The Royle Family

== People ==
- Roger Day, British broadcaster sometimes nicknamed "Twiggy"
- Andrew Forrest, nicknamed "Twiggy", an Australian mining magnate and one of the country's richest men
- James "Twiggy" Sanders, American basketball player
- Twiggy Stardom, Brittany Lahm's character in American girl group Huckapoo
- Jeordie White (born 1971), American musician formerly known as Twiggy Ramirez, now simply, Twiggy

== Other uses ==
- OH 24 (aka "Twiggy"), a fossilized Homo habilis skull discovered in 1968
- Twiggy Apple FileWare, early floppy disk drives and diskettes designed by Apple
