= Hitty, Her First Hundred Years =

1929 novel by Rachel Field

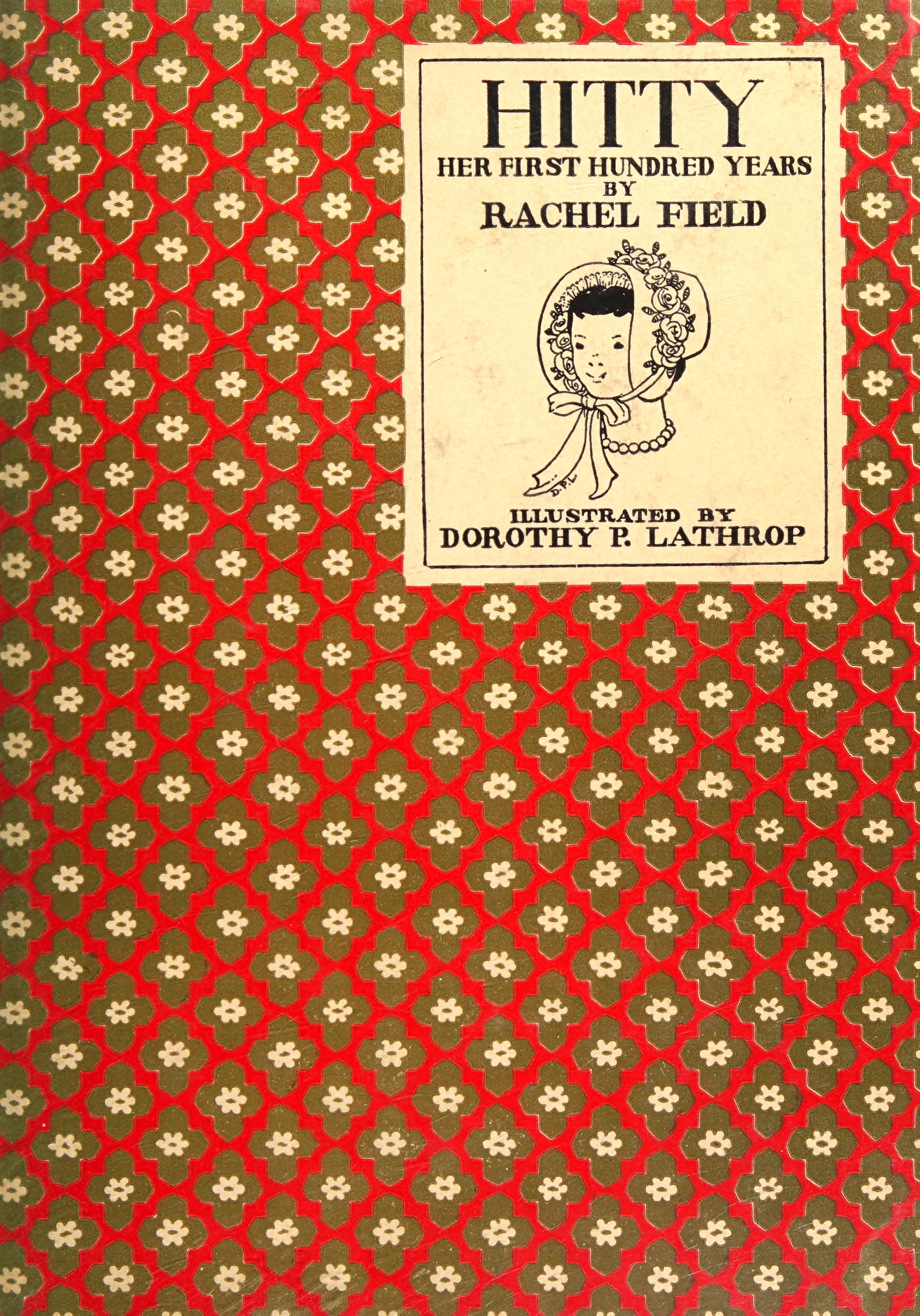
- Author: Rachel Field
- Illustrator: Dorothy P. Lathrop
- Language: English
- Genre: Children's novel
- Publisher: Macmillan
- Publication date: 1929
- Publication place: United States
- Media type: Print (Hardback & Paperback)
- Pages: 207
- Text: Hitty, Her First Hundred Years at Wikisource

Hitty, Her First Hundred Years is a children's novel written by Rachel Field and published in 1929. It won the Newbery Medal for excellence in American children's literature in 1930. The book is told from the point of view of an inanimate doll named Hitty (short for Mehitabel), who was constructed in the 1820s and traveled around the world, through many different owners.

In 1999, Susan Jeffers and Rosemary Wells updated, simplified, and rewrote Hitty's story, adding an episode about Hitty's experiences in the American Civil War.

== Plot summary ==
The narrative unfolds through the eyes of a tiny wooden doll named Mehitabel (Hitty), who was carved early in the nineteenth century from the magical wood of the Mountain Ash tree by a peddler for a little girl, Phoebe Preble, who lives on Great Cranberry Island in Maine, during a winter when her father was away at sea. As the doll narrates her beginning:

... I have heard the story told so often by one or another of the Preble family that at times it seems I, also, must have looked on as the Old Peddler carved me out of his piece of mountain-ash wood. It was a small piece, which accounts for my being slightly under-sized even for a doll, and he treasured it, having brought it across the sea from Ireland. A piece mountain-ash wood is a good thing to keep close at hand, for it brings luck besides having power against witchcraft and evil. That was the reason he had carried this about in the bottom of his pack ever since he had started peddling. Mostly he did his best business from May to November when roads were open and the weather not too cold for farmers' wives and daughters to stand on their doorsteps as he spread out his wares. But that year he tramped further north than he had been before. Snow caught him on a road between the sea and a rough, woody country. The wind blew such a gale it heaped great drifts across the road in no time and he was forced to come knocking at the kitchen door of the Preble House, where he had seen a light. Mrs. Preble always said she didn't know how she and Phoebe would have got along without the Old Peddler, for it took all three of them, besides Andy the chore boy, to keep the fires going and to water and feed the horse, the cow, and the chickens in the barn. Even when the weather cleared, the roads were impassable for many days and all vessels storm- bound in Portland Harbor. So the Peddler decided to stay on and help with odd jobs round the place till spring, since Captain Preble was off on his ship for months to come.

The book details Hitty's adventures as she becomes separated from Phoebe and travels from owner to owner over the course of a century. She ends up living in locations as far-flung as Boston, New Orleans, India, and the South Pacific. At various times, she is lost at sea, hidden in a horsehair sofa, abandoned in a hayloft, part of a snake-charmer's act, and picked up by the famous writer Charles Dickens, before arriving at her new owner's summer home in Maine, which turns out to be the original Preble residence where she first lived. From there she is purchased at auction for a New York antique shop, where she sits among larger and grander dolls of porcelain and wax, and writes her memoirs.

The story was inspired by a doll purchased by Field. The doll currently resides at the Stockbridge Library Association in Stockbridge, Massachusetts.

== Adaptations ==
In 1999, children's book author Rosemary Wells and illustrator Susan Jeffers adapted Field's novel to an illustrated storybook titled Rachel Field's Hitty: Her First Hundred Years. In a review of the text, children's literature scholar Cathryn M. Mercier notes that the adaptation removes some of the more archaic and problematic language found in Field's novel, but that Hitty loses some of her distinct characterization.

Awards
Preceded by The Trumpeter of Krakow	Newbery Medal recipient 1930	Succeeded by The Cat Who Went to Heaven
