= Gwendolyn Bowers =

American author

Gwendolyn Bowers is an American author, mostly of juvenile historical fiction.

Born in Lawrence, Massachusetts, she is a graduate of the Boston University School of Education, studying creative writing, drama and the fine arts there. She taught in the English department of the Rhode Island School of Design for fourteen years. She married George Ellery Washburn, professor emeritus of French at Boston University, and they make their home in Cambridge, Massachusetts.

== Books ==
- The Adventures of Philippe: A story of old Kebec (1949, with Fritz Kredel)
- At the Sign of the Globe (H.Z. Walck, 1966)
- Brother to Galahad (H.Z. Walck, 1963)
- A Date with Dave (Morrow, 1959)
- Journey for Jemima (H.Z. Walck, 1960)
- The Lost Dragon of Wessex (Oxford University Press, 1957)
- The Wishing Book Doll (Morrow, 1957)
