= Clifford B. Hicks =

American writer and magazine editor

Clifford B. Hicks (August 10, 1920 – September 29, 2010) was an American writer and magazine editor, best known for his children's books chronicling the adventures of Alvin Fernald.

== Biography ==
Hicks was born in Marshalltown, Iowa in 1920. He graduated cum laude from Northwestern University, then served as a U.S. Marine during World War II, earning the Silver Star. In 1945, he joined the staff of Popular Mechanics magazine, and became a special projects editor in 1963. He wrote the magazine's Do-It-Yourself Materials Guide and edited the Do-It-Yourself Encyclopedia.

In 1959, Hicks penned his first children's book, First Boy on the Moon, which was dubbed Best Juvenile Book of the Year by the Friends of American Writers. The next year, he wrote The Marvelous Inventions of Alvin Fernald, the first of a series of books about a boy who relies on his "Magnificent Brain" to solve problems.

The books inspired a pair of two-part Disney television movies: The Whiz Kid and the Mystery at Riverton (1974), and The Whiz Kid and the Carnival Caper (1976). Both starred Eric Shea as Alvin Fernald and Kim Richards as his sister Daffy and aired on The Wonderful World of Disney. Ted Gehring also appeared in both films, while Mystery at Riverton (which was based on the 1970 book Alvin Fernald, Mayor for a Day) featured John Fiedler, Dick Wilson, and Hal Smith, and the Carnival Caper featured Jaclyn Smith, Richard Bakalyan, and Ronnie Schell.

Hicks wrote one non-fiction children's book, The World Above (1965), which discusses the Earth's atmosphere and the universe beyond. In 1971, he began the Peter Potts series, which follows the misadventures of a small town boy who often gets into trouble "by accident". Hicks also wrote a two-act play, Alvin Fernald, Mayor for a Day (1992), which was based on one of his Alvin Fernald books.

On September 29, 2010, Hicks died at his home in Brevard, North Carolina, at the age of 90.

== Children's books authored by Clifford Hicks ==
=== Alvin Fernald series ===
- The Marvelous Inventions of Alvin Fernald – 1960 (illustrated by Charles Geer)
- Alvin's Secret Code – 1963
- Alvin Fernald, Foreign Trader – 1966
- Alvin Fernald, Mayor for a Day – 1970
- Alvin Fernald, Superweasel – 1974
- Alvin's Swap Shop – 1976
- Alvin Fernald, TV Anchorman – 1980
- The Wacky World of Alvin Fernald – 1981
- Alvin Fernald, Master of a Thousand Disguises – 1986
- Alvin Fernald's Incredible Buried Treasure – 2009

=== Peter Potts series ===
- Peter Potts – 1971
- Pop and Peter Potts – 1984
- Peter Potts Book of World Records – 1987

=== Other children's books ===
- First Boy on the Moon – 1959
- The World Above – 1965
