= Twig (novel) =

1942 novel by Elizabeth Orton Jones

- 60th Anniversary Edition
- Author: Elizabeth Orton Jones
- Illustrator: Elizabeth Orton Jones
- Language: English
- Genre: Children's fantasy
- Publisher: Macmillan
- Publication date: 1942
- Publication place: United States
- Pages: 152
- ISBN: 1-930900-05-8 (Anniversary edition)

Twig is a children's fantasy novel written and illustrated by Elizabeth Orton Jones. It was originally published by Macmillan in 1942. The book was reissued in a 60th Anniversary Edition by Purple House Press in 2002.

== Plot summary ==
The novel features Twig, an imaginative little city girl who turns a tomato can into a house for fairies. A little elf comes along to live in the house and, at Twig's request, turns her fairy-sized, though he cannot manage wings. A friendly sparrow fetches the Queen of the fairies to help.

== Reception ==
The New York Times praised the book by saying, "Miss Jones, who knows children well, has told stories with warmth and simplicity." The Horn Book Guide's review of the anniversary edition described the book as "full of magic, full of fun, full of fantasy interwoven with reality, and full of the kind of tenderness which belongs most particularly to the very young."

The book was so popular at the time Elizabeth moved to the town of Mason, New Hampshire that Elizabeth herself was known as "Twig" to her neighbors; many residents did not know her as anything else.

== In popular culture ==
Twig (although mistakenly referring to the elf and not the heroine) is recalled by Kinsey Millhone as being her favorite book when orphaned at age 5. She mentions the tomato can. ("I" is for Innocent by Sue Grafton)
