= Jane Thayer =

American children's writer

- Born: Catherine Woolley; August 11, 1904; Chicago, Illinois, US
- Died: July 23, 2005 (aged 100); Truro, Massachusetts, US
- Education: University of California, Los Angeles
- Occupation: Writer
- Writing career
- Genre: Children's picture books
- Notable work: The Puppy Who Wanted a Boy

Catherine Woolley (August 11, 1904 – July 23, 2005) known also by the pen name Jane Thayer, was an American children's writer. She is known best for the book The Puppy Who Wanted a Boy, which became the basis of a 1978 animated television special. The special eventually went on to spin off three sequel specials and a 1980s Saturday Morning cartoon series, The Puppy's Further Adventures. Thayer wrote 86 books for children, many of which (The Blueberry Pie Elf, The Puppy Who Wanted a Boy, The Popcorn Dragon) have become classics. She was so prolific that her editor suggested she publish some of her works under a pen name. Thus, Woolley authored picture books under the name Jane Thayer, her grandmother's name, while writing books for older children and adults under her real name.

== Biography ==
A 1927 graduate of the University of California, Los Angeles, she worked as an advertising copywriter and freelance writer in New York City during the late 1920s and early 1930s. From 1933 to 1940, she worked as a copywriter in publicity for the American Radiator & Standard Corporation. She found a job as a desk editor for the Architectural Record and as a production editor for the Society of Automotive Engineers Journal in the early 1940s. By the time Woolley had advanced to the position of public relations writer for the National Association of Manufacturers in New York City, she had also begun writing and publishing children's books. Her debut, I Like Trains, appeared in 1944.

She left her public relations job in 1947 to concentrate full-time on writing, though she occasionally taught classes and led writing workshops. Her many books written under her own name include the "Ginny" and "Cathy" series. As Thayer, she wrote such books as Sandy and the Seventeen Balloons (1955), Quiet on Account of Dinosaur (1964), and Mr. Turtle's Magic Glasses (1971). Her last book for children, Clever Raccoon, came out in 1981. In 1989, The Popcorn Dragon (1953) was reissued. That year she also published her one book for adults, Writing for Children.

The Truro Public Library in her hometown, the seaside village of Truro, Massachusetts, honored her in 1996 by naming its children's room after her, and in 2004, the town of Truro declared her birthday, August 11, to be Catherine Woolley Day.

== Works ==
=== Gus the Ghost books ===
- Gus Was a Friendly Ghost (1961)
- Little Lost Ghost (1966)
- What's a Ghost Going to Do? (1966)
- Gus and the Baby Ghost (1972)
- Gus Was a Christmas Ghost (1972)
- Gus Was a Mexican Ghost (1974)
- Gus Was a Gorgeous Ghost (1978)
- Gus Goes to School (earlier Gus Was a Real Dumb Ghost) (1982)
- Gus Loved His Happy Home (1989)

=== Ginnie series ===
- Ginnie and Geneva (1949)
- Ginnie Joins In (1951)
- Ginnie and the New Girl (1954)
- Ginnie and the Mystery House (1957)
- Ginnie and the Mystery Doll (1960)
- Ginnie and Her Juniors (later Ginnie's Baby-Sitting Business) (1963)
- Ginnie and the Cooking Contest (1966)
- Ginnie and the Wedding Bells (1967)
- Ginnie and the Mystery Cat (1969)
- Ginnie and the Mystery Light (1973)
- Ginnie and Geneva Cookbook (1975)

=== Cathy series ===
- A Room for Cathy (1956)
- Miss Cathy Leonard (1958)
- Cathy Leonard Calling (1960)
- Cathy's Little Sister (1964)
- Chris in Trouble (1968)
- Cathy and the Beautiful People (1971)
- Cathy Uncovers a Secret (1972)

=== Andy series ===
- Where's Andy? (1954)
- Andy Wouldn't Talk (1958)
- Andy's Square Blue Animal (1962)
- Andy and the Runaway Horse (1963)
- Rockets Don't Go to Chicago, Andy (1967)
- Andy and Mr. Cunningham (1969)
- Andy and the Wild Worm (1973)

=== Libby series ===
- Look Alive, Libby! (1962)
- Libby Looks for a Spy (1965)
- Libby's Uninvited Guest (1970)
- Libby Shadows a Lady (1974)

=== Other books ===
- I Like Trains (1944)
- Two Hundred Pennies (1947)
- Schoolroom Zoo (1950)
- Lunch for Lennie (1952)
- The Little Car that Wanted a Garage (1952)
- The Popcorn Dragon (1953)
- Holiday on wheels (1953)
- The Animal Train and Other Stories (1953)
- Ellie's Problem Dog (1955)
- David's Railroad (1957)
- The Outside Cat (1957)
- Railroad Cowboy (1958)
- The Puppy Who Wanted a Boy (1958)
- David's Campaign Buttons (1959)
- Little Monkey (1959)
- A Little Dog Called Kitty (1961)
- Blueberry Pie Elf (1961)
- A Drink for Little Red Diker (1963)
- Quiet on Account of Dinosaur (1964)
- Part-Time Dog (1965)
- The Shieny [sic] Red Rubber Boots (1965)
- The Lighthearted Wolf (1966)
- The Cat That Joined the Club (1967)
- Little Mr. Greenthumb (1968)
- Curious, Furious Chipmunk (1969)
- I'm Not a Cat, Said Emerald (1970)
- Mr. Turtle's Magic Glasses (1971)
- Timothy and Madam Mouse (1971)
- The Little House; A New Math Story-Game (1972)
- I Don't Believe in Elves (1975)
- The Mouse on the Fourteenth Floor (1977)
- Try Your Hand (1979)
- Where is Squirrel? (1979)
- Applebaums have a robot! (1980)
- Clever Raccoon (1981)
- The Popcorn Dragon (1989, reissued)
- Read Aloud Funny Stories (1958)
- The Horse with the Easter Bonnet (1953)
- The Chicken in the Tunnel (1956)
- A Contrary Little Quail (1968)
- Little Bear Takes His Nap (included in First Story Book, 1951)
- A House for Mrs. Hopper and The Cat Who Wanted To Go Home (1963)
- The Second-Story Giraffe (1959)
- Emerald Enjoyed the Moonlight (1964)
- Mrs. Perrywinkle's Pets (1955)
- David's Hundred Dollars (1952)
- Writing for Children (published under the name Catherine Woolley) (1990)
