= Edward Ormondroyd =

American writer of children's books (1925–2025)

- Author portrait of Ormondroyd from the dust jacket of David and the Phoenix (1957)
- Born: October 8, 1925; Wilkinsburg, Pennsylvania, U.S.
- Died: September 14, 2025 (aged 99); Santa Cruz, California, U.S.
- Education: University of California, Berkeley
- Occupation: Novelist

Edward Ormondroyd (October 8, 1925 – September 14, 2025) was an American writer of children's books. He is best known for David and the Phoenix, a fantasy novel. His time travel novel Time at the Top was filmed for television in 1999.

== Life and career ==
Ormondroyd was born in Wilkinsburg, Pennsylvania on October 8, 1925. He grew up in Pennsylvania and Michigan, before serving two years on a destroyer escort in World War II. Ormondroyd participated in the invasions of Iwo Jima and Okinawa. After the war he attended the University of California at Berkeley, earning a bachelor's degree in English and a masters in Library Science.

He lived in Berkeley for 25 years, working at various jobs while he wrote children's books. In 1970 he and his wife, Joan, moved from Berkeley to Newfield a small town west of Ithaca, New York.

In 2007 he was living in Trumansburg, New York. In September 2020 it was reported that after living in Trumansburg for 30 years, Ormondroyd and his wife had moved to California to be closer to family. Joan Ormondroyd died on January 10, 2024, at the age of 93. Edward Ormondroyd died on September 14, 2025, at the age of 99.

== Works ==
Source: Loganberry Books.

- David and the Phoenix, illustrated by Joan Raysor (Berkeley, CA: Parnassus Press, 1957)
- The Tale of Alain, illus. Robert Frankenberg (Follett Publishing, 1960)
- Time at the Top, illus. Peggie Bach (Parnassus, 1963)
- Jonathan Frederick Aloysius Brown, illus. Suzi Spector Ormondroyd (San Carlos, CA: Golden Gate Junior Books, 1964)
- Theodore, illus. John M. Larrecq (Parnassus, 1966)
- Michael, the Upstairs Dog, illus. Cyndy Szekeres (Dial Press, 1967)
- Broderick, illus. Larrecq (Parnassus, 1969)
- Theodore's Rival, illus. Larrecq (Parnassus, 1971)
- Castaways on Long Ago, illus. Ruth Robbins (Parnassus, 1973)
- Imagination Greene, illus. John Lewis (Parnassus, 1973)
- All in Good Time, illus. Robbins (Parnassus, 1975) – sequel to Time at the Top
- Johnny Castleseed, illus. Diana Thewlis (Houghton Mifflin, 1985)
