= Hold That Pose =

- Directed by: Jack Kinney
- Story by: Dick Kinney; Milt Schaffer
- Produced by: Walt Disney
- Starring: Pinto Colvig; Jimmy MacDonald
- Music by: Paul Smith
- Animation by: John Sibley; Ed Aardal; Hugh Fraser; Jack Boyd
- Layouts by: Al Zinnen
- Backgrounds by: Ed Levitt
- Color process: Technicolor
- Production company: Walt Disney Productions
- Distributed by: RKO Radio Pictures
- Release date: November 3, 1950
- Running time: 6:49
- Country: United States
- Language: English

Hold That Pose is a 1950 American animated cartoon produced by Walt Disney Productions and released by RKO Radio Pictures. The film's plot centers on Goofy trying to get a job as a wildlife photographer but ending up causing trouble in a grizzly bear's pen at a zoo. This is Humphrey the Bear's debut appearance.

== Plot ==
The narrator shows Goofy taking on photography. Goofy goes to a store to get some cameras and in his basement goes to unload them and insert the film. The narrator explains that there are two types of film: roll film and cut film. When Goofy gets the film all loaded in, the narrator says that he should pick a task such as wildlife watching. Goofy goes to the grizzly bear habitat at a zoo to photograph Humphrey the Bear. Slight gags show Goofy to be an inept photographer, waking Humphrey up, putting a cape over Humphrey's head, taking pictures right in his face, and creating a small volcano that blows up on Humphrey. The last straw comes when Goofy takes a picture of Humphrey's dinner with his family. The angered bear chases Goofy out of the zoo, across town, through a stage and back to Goofy's apartment via a taxi (with Humphrey as the driver). The bear chases Goofy up the stairs, and finally into Goofy's apartment and closet where Goofy is mauled. However, Humphrey calms down after Goofy shows him his pictures, and when Humphrey goes on vacation he takes them with himself to show them to tourists.

== Home media ==
The short was released on December 2, 2002, on Walt Disney Treasures: The Complete Goofy and on the "Walt Disney's Classic Cartoon Favorites Starring Goofy" Volume 3.

== See also ==
- Rugged Bear
- Grin and Bear It
- Bearly Asleep
- Beezy Bear
- Hooked Bear
- In the Bag
