= List of Walt Disney anthology television series episodes (seasons 1–29) =

== Walt Disney's Disneyland episodes ==
The original incarnation of the anthology series was conceived as a means to fund development and construction of Disneyland, the television program originally focused on and highlighted the original four lands of the park.

Frontierland (original episodes)	Frontierland (Feature films)	Tomorrowland	Adventureland (TV episodes)	Adventureland (Feature films)	Fantasyland (animation)	Fantasyland (Theme Park Episode)	Fantasyland (TV episode)	Fantasyland (Feature films)

=== Season 1 (1954–1955) ===
Episode #	Title	Original airdate	Notes
1	The Disneyland Story	October 27, 1954	Despite being split TV program with clear first and second half it was originally aired as part of the Fantasyland. In the first half of the program provides an insight into the anthology TV series structure and its four thematic lands. The second half of the show presents a tribute to Mickey Mouse in which Walt goes behind the album of Mickey Mouse shorts. No original animation was produced for this episode. First episode hosted by Walt Disney; Nominated for an Emmy Award for Best New Television Personality for Walt Disney.
2	Alice in Wonderland	November 3, 1954	Animated episode Hosted by Walt Disney; Archival footage from the following theatrical feature is included: Alice in Wonderland (1951) in condensed form.
3	Prairie / Seal Island	November 10, 1954	Nature Fantasy Film. Which primarily re-edits footage from four of Disney's True-Life Adventure theatrical releases.
4	The Donald Duck Story	November 17, 1954	Animated Episode (Donald Duck at Disney Studio); Hosted by Walt Disney; Archival clips from the following theatrical shorts were included: Orphan's Benefit (1941), Honey Harvester (1949), Tea For Two Hundred (1948), Donald's Dream Voice (1948) Three For Breakfast (1948) The Lone Chipmunks (1954) and Donald's Crime (1945) Although it features original animation, the episode lacks a single narrative continuity. Instead, this new footage is used to expand or altering the happenings on existing animated shorts.
5	So Dear to My Heart	November 24, 1954	Frontierland episode Hosted by Walt Disney; Archival footage from the following theatrical feature is included: So Dear to My Heart (1948) in condensed form.
6	A Story of Dogs	December 1, 1954	Animation Behind the Scenes & Behind the album/Book of Pluto Episode Hosted by Walt Disney Archival clips from the following theatrical Feature were included: Lady and the Tramp (1955) Archival clips from the following theatrical shorts were included: Beach Picnic (1939) Lend A Paw (1941) and The Legend Of Coyote Rock (1945)
7	Operation Undersea	December 8, 1954	Behind the scenes Episode. Walt Disney takes viewers on a rare dive-through the filming for 20,000 Leagues Under the Sea. (1954). The episode also includes History of Diving animation sequence.
8	Davy Crockett: Indian Fighter	December 15, 1954	Davy Crockett Western TV mini-series Episode 1 of 5. Animated maps and sequence are used to explain the Indian fights. Later released theatrically as part of Davy Crockett, King of the Wild Frontier.
9	A Present for Donald	December 22, 1954	Animated episode Hosted by Donald Duck; Archival footage from the following theatrical feature is included: The Three Caballeros (1944) in condensed form with an alternative ending.
10	Cameras in Africa / Beaver Valley	December 29, 1954	Despite being split TV program with clear first and second half it was originally aired as part of the Adventureland. In the first half of the program was filmed as behind the scenes look at the production of True-Life Adventures feature film African Lion. The second half of the program featured one of the films from the series In Beaver Valley.
11	Treasure Island	January 5, 1955	A Historical Drama feature film from 1950, serialized version in two parts.
12	Treasure Island	January 12, 1955	A Historical Drama feature film from 1950, serialized version in two parts.
13	Monsters of the Deep	January 19, 1955	Behind the scenes Episode. Walt Disney takes viewers on a rare dive-through the filming for 20,000 Leagues Under the Sea. (1954). The episode also includes fully animated but deleted The Giant Squid animation sequence and under and discussion of various sea monsters. Archival footage from the following theatrical feature is included: Fantasia-Rite Of Spring (1940), Pinocchio (1940)
14	Davy Crockett Goes to Congress	January 26, 1955	Davy Crockett, Western TV mini-series episode 2 of 5. later released theatrically as part of Davy Crockett, King of the Wild Frontier.
15	Wind in the Willows	February 2, 1955	Animated episode Hosted by Walt Disney Archival footage from the following theatrical feature is included: The Reluctant Dragon - the Animation (1941) and The Adventures of Ichabod and Mr. Toad-Wind in the Willows(1949). Note: No original animation was produced for this program.
16	A Progress Report / Nature's Half Acre	February 9, 1955	Despite being split TV program with clear first and second half it was originally aired as part of the Adventureland. In the first half of the program provides an insight into the progress report from the Disneyland Theme Park. The second half of the program featured True-Life Adventure short film Nature's Half Acre.
17	Cavalcade of Songs	February 16, 1955	Animation Behind the Scenes Episode. Hosted by Walt Disney; Archival clips from the following theatrical shorts were included: The Three Little Pigs (1933), Snow White and the Seven Dwarfs (1937) and Song of the South (1946); Considering the nature of this episode no original animation was produced.
18	Davy Crockett at the Alamo	February 23, 1955	Davy Crockett Western TV mini-series episode 3 of 5. Animated maps are used to explain the siege at The Alamo. later released theatrically as part of Davy Crockett, King of the Wild Frontier.
19	From Aesop to Hans Christian Andersen	March 2, 1955	Animated episode Hosted by Walt Disney; Archival footage from the following theatrical feature is included: The Tortoise And The Hare (1935) The Country Cousin (1936), The Brave Little Tailor (1938) The Ugly Duckling (1939). Although it features original animation, the episode lacks a single continuous storyline. Instead, the new animation is used to expand upon scenes from the included shorts, rather than connecting them.
20	Man in Space	March 9, 1955	Tomorrowland TV episode Space Exploaration; The educational film All About Weightlessness was released in September 1964, its abridged version of this program. Later released theatrically in 1956 with Davy Crockett and the River Pirates, and nominated for the Academy Award for Best Documentary Short.
21	The Pre-Opening Report from Disneyland	July 13, 1955	Despite being split TV program with clear first and second half it was originally aired as part of the Fantasyland. In the first half of the program provides the preparation of the Grand opening of the Disneyland theme Park The second half of the show presents a tribute to Mickey Mouse in which Walt goes behind the album of Mickey Mouse shorts. No original animation was produced for this episode. It reuses the animated footage from earlier ABC episode The Disneyland Story (1954, TV)

=== Season 2 (1955–1956) ===
Episode #	Title	Original airdate	Notes
22	Dumbo	September 14, 1955	Animated episode Hosted by Walt Disney; Archival footage from the following theatrical feature is included: Dumbo (1941) in condensed form.
23	Behind the True-Life Cameras / Olympic Elk	September 21, 1955	Despite being split TV program with clear first and second half it was originally aired as part of the Adventureland. In the first half of the program was filmed as behind the scenes look at the production of True-Life Adventures series. The second half of the program featured one of the films from the series the Olympic Elk.
24	Jiminy Cricket Presents Bongo	September 28, 1955	Animated episode Hosted by Jiminy Cricket; Compilation episode which includes the following theatrical shorts: Chicken Little (1943), Figaro And Cleo (1943) and Fun and Fancy Free-Bongo (1947).
25	People and Places – Tiburon, Sardinia, Morocco / Icebreakers	October 5, 1955	Despite being split TV program with clear first and second half it was originally aired as part of the Adventureland. In the first half of the program included the Tiburon which was People & Places short which was never completed. The second half of the program featured sequences from: The Blue Men of Morocco (1957), Sardinia (1956) and Men Against the Arctic (1955)
26	The Adventures of Mickey Mouse	October 12, 1955	Animation Episode; Behind the album/books of Mickey Mouse Episode. Hosted by Walt Disney; Archival clips from the following theatrical shorts were included:The Band Concert (1935), Alpine Climbers (1936), Squatter's Rights (1946) and Fun and Fancy Free-Mickey and the Beanstalk (1947) (Note: With Alternative narration and Ending); Re-aired in 1980 and re-titled Mickey's Greatest Adventures, where The Band Concert (1935) is replaced with Mickey's Trailer (1938). Although it features original animation, the episode lacks a single continuous storyline. Instead, the new animation is used to expand upon scenes from the included shorts, rather than connecting them.
27	The Story of the Silly Symphony	October 19, 1955	Animated episode Hosted by Walt Disney; Archival footage from the following theatrical feature is included: Flowers And Trees (1932), The Practical Pig (1939), Three Orphan Kittens (1935), Little Hiawatha (1937), The Old Mill (1937) and Ferdinand The Bull (1938). Although it features original animation, the episode lacks a single continuous storyline. Instead, the new animation is used to expand upon scenes from the included shorts, rather than connecting them.
28	The Legend of Sleepy Hollow	October 26, 1955	Animated episode Hosted by Walt Disney throughout Archival clips from the following theatrical shorts were included: The Adventures Of Ichabod And Mr. Toad-The Legend Of Sleepy Hollow (1949) Although it features heavy use of original animation, the episode lacks a single continuous storyline as new animation is used to portray Washington Irving's life rather than being an extension of The Legend of Sleepy Hollow storyline.
29	The Story of Robin Hood	November 2, 1955	A Historical Drama feature film The Story of Robin Hood and His Merrie Men from 1952, serialized version in two parts.
30	The Story of Robin Hood	November 9, 1955	A Historical Drama feature film The Story of Robin Hood and His Merrie Men from 1952, serialized version in two parts.
31	Davy Crockett's Keelboat Race	November 16, 1955	Davy Crockett Western TV mini-series episode 4 of 5. Animated maps are used to explain the race track. later released theatrically as part of Davy Crockett and the River Pirates.
32	The Story of the Animated Drawing	November 30, 1955	Animation Behind the Scenes Episode. Hosted by Walt Disney; Archival clips from the following theatrical shorts were included: Skeleton Dance (1929), Steamboat Willie (1928) and Fantasia-Nutcracker Suite (1940). As this episode was documentary on the history of animation the following non-Disney created animated shorts were also included: Humorous Phases Of Funny Faces (1906), Gertie The Dinosaur (1914). Colonel Heeza Liar in Africa (1913), Animated Grouch Chasers (1915), Bobby Bumps Adventures (1915), Feline Follies (1919) and The Tantalizing Fly (1919); Considering the nature of this no original animation was created for this episode.
33	The Goofy Success Story	December 7, 1955	Animated Episode; Hosted by Goofy. Compilation episode which includes the following theatrical shorts: Moving Day (1936), Moose Hunters (1937), How To Ride a Horse (1941) and Motor Mania (1950)
34	Davy Crockett and the River Pirates	December 14, 1955	Davy Crockett Western TV mini-series episode 5 of 5. Animated maps are used to explain the River Pirates path. Later released theatrically as part of Davy Crockett and the River Pirates.
35	Man and the Moon	December 28, 1955	Tomorrowland TV episode Space Exploaration; Re-aired as Tomorrow the Moon on Walt Disney Present incarnation of the anthology series.
36	When Knighthood Was in Flower	January 4, 1956	A Historical Drama feature film The Sword and the Rose from 1953, serialized version in two parts.
37	When Knighthood Was in Flower	January 11, 1956	A Historical Drama feature film The Sword and the Rose from 1953, serialized version in two parts.
38	A Tribute to Joel Chandler Harris	January 18, 1956	A biographical Drama TV film. Which is a dramatize the life of Atlanta-based author and folklorist Joel Chandler Harris. Archival clips from the following theatrical feature were included: Song of the South (1946).
39	A Day in the Life of Donald Duck	February 1, 1956	Animated Episode (Donald Duck at Disney Studio); Hosted by Walt Disney and then Donald Duck; Archival clips from the following theatrical shorts were included: Drip Dippy Donald (1948), Fire Chief (1940) Vanishing Private (1942) and Good Scouts (1938).
40	Survival in Nature	February 8, 1956	Nature Fantasy Film. Which primarily re-edits footage from four of Disney's True-Life Adventure theatrical releases.
41	Our Unsung Villains	February 15, 1956	Animated and Live-action Episode. Hosted by Hans Conried (dressed as The Magic Mirror); Archival clips from the following theatrical shorts were included:The Three Little Wolves (1936), Snow White And The Seven Dwarfs (1937), Song of the South (1946), Peter Pan (1953); Although it features use of original animation, the episode lacks a single continuous storyline. Instead, the new animation is used to expand upon scenes from the included shorts, rather than connecting them.
42	A Trip Through Adventureland / Water Birds	February 29, 1956	Despite being split TV program with clear first and second half it was originally aired as part of the Adventureland. In the first half of the program provides an insight into the progress report from the Disneyland theme Park on the Jungle Cruise ride. The second half of the program featured one of the films from the series Water Birds.
43	On Vacation	March 7, 1956	Animated episode Also known as On Vacation with Mickey Mouse and Friends. Hosted by Jiminy Cricket. Compilation episode which includes the following theatrical shorts: Canine Caddy (1941), Bubble Bee (1949), Goofy and Wilbur (1939), Dude Duck (1951), Mickey's Trailer (1938), and Hawaiian Holiday (1937).
44	Stormy the Thoroughbred	March 14, 1956	Nature Survival film. Equestrian story Originally released as theatrical documentary featurette.
45	The Goofy Sports Story	March 21, 1956	Animated episode Hosted by Goofy; Compilation episode which includes the following theatrical shorts: The Olympic Champ (1942) Goofy Gymnastics (1949), The Art Of Skiing How To Play Baseball (1942) and How To Play Football (1944)
46	Where Do the Stories Come From?	April 4, 1956	Animation Behind the Scenes Episode. Hosted by Walt Disney; Archival clips from the following theatrical shorts were included: Crazy Over Daisy (1950), R'Coon Dawg (1951), Donald Gets Drafted (1942), Fall Out - Fall In (1943), Out Of Scale (1951). The episode also included delete sequence from Snow White And The Seven Dwarfs (1937). Although it features original animation, the episode lacks a single narrative continuity. Instead, this new footage is used to expand on existing animated shorts, specifically to demonstrate how animated stories comes to be.
47	Behind the Scenes with Fess Parker	May 30, 1956	Adventureland Episode (despite Frontierland theme) (Note: Because this episode is behind the scenes promo of the feature film it was classified as Adventureland episode in its original broadcast, rather than Frontierland.) A companion piece to feature film The Great Locomotive Chase. (1956) footage both from the final film and footage on the historical railroads and tours of vintage Civil War locomotives are woven into Fess Parker's narration, as it goes behind the scenes.

=== Season 3 (1956–1957) ===
Episode #	Title	Original airdate	Note
48	Antarctica – Past and Present	September 12, 1956	Nature Survival TV film. On science explorations in Antarctica. Later edited into the 1958 release Seven Cities of Antarctica.
49	The Great Cat Family	September 19, 1956	Animated episode Hosted by Walt Disney throughout Archival clips from the following theatrical shorts were included: Pinocchio (1940), Cinderella (1950), Alice in Wonderland (1951) and Lambert the Sheepish Lion (1952); Although it features heavy use of original animation, the episode lacks a single continuous storyline. Instead, the new animation is used to expand upon scenes from the included shorts, rather than connecting them. Footage from the True-Life Adventures film African Lion (1955) is also used.
50	Searching for Nature's Mysteries	September 26, 1956	Nature Survival TV film. Behind the scenes of making the True-Life Adventures film Secrets of Life which was still in production at the time. Filming Nature's Mysteries Educational 16mm film was edited out of this show released in July 1976.
51	Rob Roy	October 3, 1956	A Historical Drama feature film Rob Roy, the Highland Rogue, rom 1953, serialized version in two parts.
52	Rob Roy	October 10, 1956	A Historical Drama feature film Rob Roy, the Highland Rogue, rom 1953, serialized version in two parts.
53	Goofy's Cavalcade of Sports	October 17, 1956	Animated Episode; Hosted by Goofy. Compilation episode which includes the following theatrical shorts: The Art Of Self Defense (1941), How To Fish (1942), How To Swim (1942), How To Play Golf (1944) and Double Dribble (1946).
54	Behind the Cameras at Lapland / The Alaskan Eskimo	October 24, 1956	Despite being split TV program with clear first and second half it was originally aired as part of the Adventureland. In the first half of the program was filmed in the spirit of the People & Places series in Lapland. The second half of the program featured one of the films from the series. The featurette the everyday home life of the families in a typical Eskimo village in The Alaskan Eskimo.
55	The Plausible Impossible	October 31, 1956	Animation Behind the Scenes Episode. Hosted by Walt Disney; Archival clips from the following theatrical shorts were included: Thru The Mirror (1936), Donald's Cousin Gus (1939) and Fantasia-Rite of Spring (1940); The episode also included delete sequence from Snow White And The Seven Dwarfs (1937). Although it features original animation, the episode lacks a single narrative continuity. Instead, this new footage is used to expand on existing animated shorts, specifically to demonstrate principles of animation physics
56	Cameras in Samoa / The Holland Story	November 7, 1956	Despite being split TV program with clear first and second half it was originally aired as part of the Adventureland. In the first half of the program was behind the scenes look at filming of People & Places theatrical featurette Samoa. filmed in the spirit of the People & Places series in Lapland. The second half of the program originally produced for Television and in the spirit of the People & Places series is set in Holland with the focus on its dikes.
57	Along the Oregon Trail	November 14, 1956	Western TV film. A companion piece to feature film Westward Ho, the Wagons! (1956) Animated maps are used to show the Oregon Trail's track while the episode, and scenes from the movie are woven into Fess Parker's narration of the trail and all new footage not in the film.
58	At Home with Donald Duck	November 21, 1956	Animated Episode; Hosted by Donald Duck; Compilation episode which includes the following theatrical shorts: Donald's Happy Birthday (1949), Mickey and the Seal (1948) Foul Hunting (1947) Pluto's Blue Note (1947) and Sea Salts (1949). Note: The 1950s's Mickey Mouse clubs cast made a cameo appearance in the episode when episode was syndicated in 1970s the 1950s Mickey Mouse Club cast was replaced with the 1970s cast.
59	Pluto's Day	December 12, 1956	Animated Episode; Hosted by Pluto; Compilation episode which includes the following theatrical shorts: A Gentleman's Gentleman (1941), Bone Trouble (1940), Mother Pluto (1936), Food For Feudin (1950) The Simple Things (1953), Pluto's Playmate (1941).
60	Your Host, Donald Duck	January 16, 1957	Animated Episode (Donald Duck at Disney Studio); Hosted by Walt Disney and then Donald Duck; Archival clips from the following theatrical shorts were included: Clown Of The Jungle (1947), Uncle Donald's Ants (1952) Test Pilot Donald (1951), and Timber (1941)
61	Our Friend the Atom	January 23, 1957	Tomorrowland TV episode the atom's explored as a potential power source for submarines and space shuttles. Despite use of original animation the episode doesn't form one continuity rather the animation's used highlight chemical reactions in one form or another these reactions are highlighted in the Animated TV story of The Fisherman And The Genie. In 1980, an updated version was produced as an educational film entitled The Atom: A Closer Look.
62	All About Magic	January 30, 1957	Animated and Live-action Episode. Hosted by Hans Conried (dressed as The Magic Mirror); Archival clips from the following theatrical shorts were included: Magician Mickey (1937) Trick or Treat (1952), Cinderella (1950) and Fantasia-The Sorcerer's Apprentice (1940); Although it features heavy use of original animation, the episode lacks a single continuous storyline. Instead, the new animation is used to expand upon scenes from the included shorts, rather than connecting them.
63	Tricks of Our Trade	February 13, 1957	Animation Behind the Scenes Episode. Hosted by Walt Disney Archival clips from the following theatrical shorts were included: Snow White And The Seven Dwarfs (1937), Fantasia-Rite Of Spring (1940) Fantasia-Dance Of The Hours, Bambi (1942); Although it features original animation, the episode lacks a single narrative continuity. Instead, this new footage is used to expand on existing animated shorts, specifically to demonstrate principles of animation physics. Mickey Mouse makes cameo appearance.
64	The Crisler Story / Prowlers of the Everglades	February 27, 1957	Despite being split TV program with clear first and second half it was originally aired as part of the Adventureland. In the first half of the program was filmed as behind the scenes look at the production of the controversial White Wilderness from the True-Life Adventures series. The second half of the program featured one of the films from the series the Prowlers of the Everglades.
65	Man in Flight	March 6, 1957	Tomorrowland episode Focusing on history of flight. Archival clips from the following theatrical shorts were included: Fantasia-Pastoral Symphony (1940) and Victory Through Air Power-The history of aviation (1943); Despite use of original animation the episode doesn't form one continuity rather the animation's used extend scenes of the included shorts to highlight flight physics. In 1961 when the episode was rerun A portion of the original footage was cut to include a promotional preview for then upcoming Disney live-action film, The Absent-Minded Professor.
66	The Adventure Story	March 20, 1957	Animated Episode; Also known as The Goofy Adventure Story. Hosted by Goofy. Compilation episode which includes the following theatrical shorts: Californy er Bust (1945), African Diary (1945) For Whom The Bulls Toil (1953), Tiger Trouble (1945) and Father's Lion (1952)
67	Donald's Award	March 27, 1957	Animated Episode; Hosted by Jiminy Cricket; Compilation episode which includes the following theatrical shorts: Out On A Limb (1950), Cured Duck (1945), Trombone Trouble (1944), The Eyes Have It (1945) and Bee On Guard (1951).
68	Disneyland, the Park / Pecos Bill	April 3, 1957	Western split program episode The first half of the episode was helicopter tour around the Disneyland Theme Park. The second part showed archival footage from the following animated theatrical short: Melody Time-Pecos Bill (1948); No new animation was produced for this episode.
69	People of the Desert	April 10, 1957	Despite being split TV program with clear first and second half it was originally aired as part of the Adventureland. In the first half of the program included the Navajo Adventure which was People & Places short in all but name. The second half of the program featured The Blue Men of Morocco which was officially part of the People & Places series.
70	More About Silly Symphonies	April 17, 1957	Animated episode Hosted by Walt Disney throughout Archival clips from the following theatrical shorts were included: Merbabies (1938), The Grasshopper And The Ants (1934), Farmyard Symphony (1938), Who Killed Cock Robin? (1935) and Wynken, Blynken and Nod (1938); Although it features heavy use of original animation, the episode lacks a single continuous storyline. Instead, the new animation is used to expand upon scenes from the included shorts, rather than connecting them.
71	The Yellowstone Story / Bear Country	May 1, 1957	Despite being split TV program with clear first and second half it was originally aired as part of the Adventureland. In the first half of the program was filmed as behind the scenes look at the production the True-Life Adventures film The second half of the program featured Bear Country which was filmed in Yellowstone.
72	The Liberty Story	May 29, 1957	Western split program episode The first half of program features several sequences from live-action film Johnny Tremain; The second half consists of the 1953 Animated featurette film Ben and Me, with a newly animated prologue. Because of episode over all theme i.e. stories from legendary past it was classified in its original airing as Frontierland episode.
73	Antarctica – Operation Deepfreeze	June 5, 1957	Nature Survival TV film. On science explorations in Antarctica. Later edited into the 1958 release Seven Cities of Antarctica.

=== Season 4 (1957–1958) ===
Episode #	Title	Original airdate	Notes
74	The Fourth Anniversary Show	September 11, 1957	Companion Episode to The Mickey Mouse Club; In the first half Walt goes behind the scene of production of Make Mine Music-Peter and the Wolf (1946) in the second half the Mickey Mouse club staff reproduce the unproduced feature film The Rainbow Road to Oz Animated Mickey Mouse makes cameo at the end.
75	4 Fabulous Characters	September 18, 1957	Animation Episode; Behind the album/books of Mickey Mouse Episode. Hosted by Walt Disney; Archival clips from the following theatrical shorts were included: The Brave Engineer (1950), Make Mine Music-The Martins and the Coys (1946), Make Mine Music-Casey at the Bat (1948) and Melody Time-The Legend of Johnny Appleseed (1946); The Four animated stories that originated from the pages of American folklore were presented as part of the Frontierland. No original animation was produced for this program.
76	Adventure in Wildwood Heart	September 25, 1957	Despite being split program with clear first and second half it was originally aired as part of the Adventureland. In the first half of the program A "Behind-the-scenes" use of nature in Disney animated feature films. In the second half the program presents Perri produced True-Life Fantasy from 1957, in consigned form. No original animation was produced for this episode.
77	Andy's Initiation	October 2, 1957	Saga of Andy Burnett Western TV miniseries. Episode 1 of 6.
78	Andy's First Chore	October 9, 1957	Saga of Andy Burnett Western TV miniseries. Episode 2 of 6.
79	Andy's Love Affair	October 16, 1957	Saga of Andy Burnett Western TV miniseries. Episode 3 of 6.
80	Duck for Hire	October 23, 1957	Animated episode Hosted by Donald Duck; Compilation episode which includes the following theatrical shorts: Lucky Number (1951)Straight Shooters (1947) Truant Officer Donald (1941) Lighthouse Keeping (1946) Bellboy Donald (1942) All In A Nutshell (1949)
81	Adventures in Fantasy	November 6, 1957	Animated episode Hosted by Walt Disney throughout Archival clips from the following theatrical shorts were included: Make Mine Music-Johnny Fedora and Alice Blue Bonnet (1946), The Little House (1952), Susie the Little Blue Coupe (1952) and Melody Time-Little Toot (1948). Although it features heavy use of original animation, the episode lacks a single continuous storyline. Instead, the new animation is used to expand upon scenes from the included shorts, rather than connecting them.
82	To the South Pole for Science	November 13, 1957	Nature Survival TV film. On science explorations in Antarctica.
83	The Best Doggoned Dog in the World	November 20, 1957	Despite being split TV program with clear first and second half it was originally aired as part of the Adventureland. The first half of the program was tribute to dogs everywhere and a promotional "making-of" special for the film Old Yeller. In the second half of the program the Arizona Sheepdog is featured. In 1961, when the episode was re-aired the preview of Old Yeller was removed and replaced with a "making-of" preview of animated feature One Hundred and One Dalmatians (1961)
84	How to Relax	November 27, 1957	Animated episode Hosted by Goofy; Compilation episode which includes the following theatrical shorts: Hold That Pose (1950), Home Made Home (1951) Hockey Homicide (1945) Two Weeks Vacation (1952) and Hello Aloha (1952)
85	Mars and Beyond	December 4, 1957	Tomorrowland TV episode. Space Exploaration. The film was released theatrically as a 49-minute featurette on December 26, 1957. Portions of the film were re-edited into the educational 16-mm Cosmic Capers, in 1979.
86	The Horse of the West	December 11, 1957	Neo-western TV film. Equestrian story. Rex Allen plays himself in this story. Allen was a frequent narrator on Disney nature and western themed stories focusing on animals.
87	Faraway Places – High, Hot and Wet	January 1, 1958	Despite being split TV program with clear first and second half it was originally aired as part of the Adventureland. In the first half of the program was filmed in the spirit of the People & Places series in Andes mountain range in Peru, and on the Fiji Islands. The second half of the program featured one of the films from the series. The featurette shows the everyday lives of the people of Siam.
88	Saludos Amigos	January 8, 1958	Animated episode Hosted by Walt Disney and Disney staff Archival footage from the following theatrical feature is included: Saludos Amigos (1942) in condensed form. No original animation was produced for this episode.
89	Donald's Weekend	January 15, 1958	Animated episode Hosted by Donald Duck; Compilation episode which includes the following theatrical shorts: Early To Bed (1941), Donald's Off Day (1944), Donald's Golf Game (1938), Donald's Crime (1945) and Spare The Rod (1954) and Canvas Back Duck (1953).
90	The Littlest Outlaw	January 22, 1958	Neo-Western Feature film The Littlest Outlaw from 1955, serialized in two parts. Parts were not officially given individual titles.
91	The Littlest Outlaw	January 29, 1958	Neo-Western Feature film The Littlest Outlaw from 1955, serialized in two parts. Parts were not officially given individual titles.
92	The Land of Enemies	February 26, 1958	Saga of Andy Burnett Western TV miniseries. Episode 4 of 6.
93	White Man's Medicine	March 5, 1958	Saga of Andy Burnett Western TV miniseries. Episode 5 of 6.
94	The Big Council	March 12, 1958	Saga of Andy Burnett Western TV miniseries. Episode 6 of 6.
95	Magic and Music	March 19, 1958	Animated and Live-action Episode. Hosted by Hans Conried (dressed as The Magic Mirror); Archival clips from the following theatrical shorts were included: Melody Time-Bumble Boogie (1948), Melody Time-Once Upon a Wintertime (1948), Fantasia-The Pastoral Symphony (1940); Although it features use of original animation, the episode lacks a single continuous storyline. Instead, the new animation is used to expand upon scenes from the included shorts, rather than connecting them.
96	An Adventure in the Magic Kingdom	April 9, 1958	Theme Park episode Primiary a Live-action episode, Thinker Bell (animated) makes cameo appearance throughout the show. Later edited into a two-part serial on Disney's Adventure Time show during the 1958–59 season.
97	Four Tales on a Mouse	April 16, 1958	Animation Episode; Behind the album/books of Mickey Mouse. Hosted by Walt Disney; Archival clips from the following theatrical shorts were included: The Whalers (1938), The Pointer (1939), Pluto's Christmas Tree (1952), The Nifty Nineties (1941), The Little Whirlwind (1941) and Mickey's Birthday Party (1942). While the album format was mostly live-action, some shorts were connected with new bridge animation. Because of this, the entire episode lacks a singular storyline.
98	An Adventure in Art	April 30, 1958	Animation Behind the Scenes Episode. Hosted by Walt Disney; Archival clips from the following theatrical shorts were included: Make Mine Music-Two Silhouettes (1946), Melody Time-Trees (1948), Sleeping Beauty (1959), Fantasia-Toccata and Fugue in D Minor (1940). The educational 16-mm 4 Artists Paint 1 Tree was edited from this program and released as such in 1964. Although it features use of original animation, the episode lacks a single continuous storyline. Instead, the new animation is used to expand upon scenes from the included shorts, rather than connecting them.
99	Magic Highway, U.S.A.	May 14, 1958	Tomorrowland TV episode. Unlike previous Tomorrowland episodes this one focused on advanced technology of automobiles instead of space exploration.

== Walt Disney Presents episodes ==
At the start of the 5th season ABC rebranded the show as Walt Disney Presents.

=== Season 5 (1958–1959) ===
Episode #	Title	Original airdate	Notes
100	The Nine Lives of Elfego Baca	October 3, 1958	Elfego Baca, western TV mini-series, episode 01 of 10.
101	The Pigeon That Worked a Miracle	October 10, 1958	Nature Survival TV film, conservation of a Pigeon.
102	Four Down and Five Lives to Go	October 17, 1958	Elfego Baca, western TV mini-series, episode 02 of 10.
103	Rusty and the Falcon	October 24, 1958	Nature Survival TV film, conservation of a Falcon.
104	Texas John Slaughter	October 31, 1958	Texas John Slaughter, western TV mini-series, episode 01 of 17.
105	His Majesty, King of the Beasts	November 7, 1958	Nature Fantasy feature Film from 1955. A condensed version of the True-Life Adventure The African Lion
106	Ambush at Laredo	November 14, 1958	Texas John Slaughter, western TV mini-series, episode 02 of 17.
107	The Boston Tea Party	November 21, 1958	Western Feature film Johnny Tremain from 1957, serialized in two parts. Parts were not officially connected under an alternative title and the episodes aired weeks a part: 1 of 2.
108	Lawman or Gunman	November 28, 1958	Elfego Baca, western TV mini-series, episode 03 of 10.
109	The Shot That Was Heard Around the World	December 5, 1958	Western Feature film Johnny Tremain from 1957, serialized in two parts. Parts were not officially connected under an alternative title and the episodes aired weeks a part: 2 of 2.
110	Law and Order, Incorporated	December 12, 1958	Elfego Baca, western TV mini-series, episode 04 of 10.
111	From All of Us to All of You	December 19, 1958	Animated episode Hosted by Jiminy Cricket; Compilation episode which includes the following theatrical shorts: Santa's Workshop (1932), Toy Tinkers (1949), Peter Pan (1953) Bambi (1942) Pinocchio (1940) Lady And The Tramp (1955) Cinderella (1950) Snow White And The Seven Dwarfs (1937). Holds the record as the most re-edited episode of the anthology series.
112	Killers from Kansas	January 9, 1959	Texas John Slaughter, western TV mini-series, episode 03 of 17.
113	Niok	January 16, 1959	Despite being split program with clear first and second half it was originally aired as part of the Adventureland. In the first half of the program A "Behind-the-scenes" use of Elephants in Disney animated feature films. In the second half the program presents Niok a France produced nature survival featurette from 1957. Conservation of an Elephant. No original animation was produced for this episode.
114	Showdown at Sandoval	January 23, 1959	Texas John Slaughter, western TV mini-series, episode 04 of 17.
115	The Peter Tchaikovsky Story	January 30, 1959	A biographical Drama TV film. Which is a dramatize the life of Saint Petersburg's composer Peter Tchaikovsky. This show had two versions one in mono and one in stereo. To create the illusion of a theater stereo system, the viewer would place an AM and FM radio on either side of their television set while the stations played the sound;and was touted as the first television broadcast in widescreen and stereophonic sound. The stereo version presented a preview of Sleeping Beauty in the second half of the show, Not all TV markets could make use of this presentation so a second version of the show was also produced exclusively in mono. This version of the show included some additional animation footage in place of the instructions on how to set up the stereo set. No original animation was produced for this show however.
116	Elfego Baca, Attorney at Law	February 6, 1959	Elfego Baca, western TV mini-series, episode 05 of 10.
117	Duck Flies Coop	February 13, 1959	Animated episode Hosted by Donald Duck. Compilation episode which includes the following theatrical shorts: Animated episode Trailer Horn (1947), Grin And Bear It (1954) Winter Storage (1954), Bearly Asleep (1955), Chip An' Dale (1947) and Rugged Bear (1953).
118	The Griswold Murder	February 20, 1959	Elfego Baca, western TV mini-series, episode 06 of 10.
119	The Adventures of Chip 'n' Dale	February 27, 1959	Animated episode Also known as Mixed Nuts. Hosted by Chip 'n' Dale. Compilation episode which includes the following theatrical shorts: Two Chips and a Miss (1952) Chicken In The Rough (1951) Donald Applecore (1952) Chips Ahoy (1956) Up A Tree (1955) and Lone Chipmunks (1954)
120	The Man from Bitter Creek	March 6, 1959	Texas John Slaughter, western TV mini-series, episode 05 of 17.
121	Highway to Trouble	March 13, 1959	Animated episode Hosted by Donald Duck. Compilation episode which includes the following theatrical shorts: Lion Around (1950) Grand Canyonscope (1954) Hockey Champ (1939), Sea Scouts (1939) and Don's Fountain Of Youth (1953).
122	The Slaughter Trail	March 20, 1959	Texas John Slaughter, western TV mini-series, episode 06 of 17.
123	Toot, Whistle, Plunk and Boom	March 27, 1959	Animated episode Hosted by Professor Owl; Compilation episode which includes the following theatrical shorts: Melody (1953) Toot, Whistle, Plunk and Boom (1953), Jack And Old Mac (1956) Music Land (1935) A Cowboy Needs A Horse (1956)
124	The Wetback Hound	April 24, 1959	Nature Survival film from 1957. Conservation of a Hound. Originally released as theatrical featurette film.
125	I Captured the King of the Leprechauns	May 29, 1959	Fantasy Drama TV film. Walt Disney did acting for this episode. Walt Disney travels to Ireland to capture King Brian and convince the leprechaun monarch to star in his upcoming Hollywood movie.Darby O'Gill and the Little People (1959)

=== Season 6 (1959–1960) ===
Episode #	Title	Original airdate	Notes
126	Moochie of the Little League	October 2, 1959	Sports Comedy TV film in two parts. Moochie's first story arch.
127	Moochie of the Little League	October 9, 1959	Sports Comedy TV film in two parts. Moochie's first story arch.
128	Killers of the High Country	October 16, 1959	Nature Survival TV film. Engering of Mountain Lions.
129	The Birth of the Swamp Fox	October 23, 1959	The Swamp Fox, western TV mini-series, episode 01 of 08.
130	Brother Against Brother	October 30, 1959	The Swamp Fox, western TV mini-series, episode 02 of 08.
131	Perilous Assignment	November 6, 1959	Nature Survival TV Film. Behind-the-scenes of the filming of Third Man on the Mountain on location in Zermatt, Switzerland. Where film crew had deal with the dangers of mountaineering. The film it self was serialized in two parts on the anthology series four years later.
132	Move Along, Mustangers	November 13, 1959	Elfego Baca, western TV mini-series, episode 07 of 10.
133	Mustang Man, Mustang Maid	November 20, 1959	Elfego Baca, western TV mini-series, episode 08 of 10.
134	A Storm Called Maria	November 27, 1959	Nature Survival TV film. Birth of Tropical storms in Pacific Ocean.
135	The Robber Stallion	December 4, 1959	Texas John Slaughter, western TV mini-series, episode 07 of 17.
136	Wild Horse Revenge	December 11, 1959	Texas John Slaughter, western TV mini-series, episode 08 of 17.
137	Range War at Tombstone	December 18, 1959	Texas John Slaughter, western TV mini-series, episode 09 of 17.
138	Tory Vengeance	January 1, 1960	The Swamp Fox, western TV mini-series, episode 03 of 08.
139	Day of Reckoning	January 8, 1960	The Swamp Fox, western TV mini-series, episode 04 of 08.
140	Redcoat Strategy	January 15, 1960	The Swamp Fox, western TV mini-series, episode 05 of 08.
141	A Case of Treason	January 22, 1960	The Swamp Fox, western TV mini-series, episode 06 of 08.
142	Wild Burro of the West	January 29, 1960	Nature Survival TV film. Equestrian story
143	Two Happy Amigos	February 5, 1960	Animated episode Hosted by Donald Duck and Jose Carioca; Compilation episode which includes the following theatrical shorts: Honey Harvester (1949), Morris The Midget Moose (1950), The Pelican And The Snipe (1944) and sequences from South of the Border films The Three Caballeros (1945) and Saludos Amigos (1942)
144	Desperado from Tombstone	February 12, 1960	Texas John Slaughter, western TV mini-series, episode 10 of 17.
145	Apache Friendship	February 19, 1960	Texas John Slaughter, western TV mini-series, episode 11 of 17.
146	Kentucky Gunslick	February 26, 1960	Texas John Slaughter, western TV mini-series, episode 12 of 17.
147	Geronimo's Revenge	March 4, 1960	Texas John Slaughter, western TV mini-series, episode 13 of 17.
148	This Is Your Life, Donald Duck	March 11, 1960	Animated episode Hosted by Jiminy Cricket and Donald Duck; Compilation episode which includes the following theatrical shorts: Donald's Better Self (1938), Donald's Lucky Day (1939) Donald Gets Drafted (1942) Sky Trooper (1942), Working For Peanuts (1953) Mickey's Amateurs (1937) Bee At The Beach (1950) and Donald's Diary (1954)
149	Friendly Enemies at Law	March 18, 1960	Elfego Baca, western TV mini-series, episode 09 of 10.
150	Gus Tomlin is Dead	March 25, 1960	Elfego Baca, western TV mini-series, episode 10 of 10.
151	The Mad Hermit of Chimney Butte	April 1, 1960	Animated episode Hosted by Donald Duck; Episode is four part story and a compilation episode which includes the following theatrical shorts: The New Neighbor (1953) Slide Donald Slide (1949) Inferior Decorator (1948) Beezy Bear (1955) Hook, Lion And Sinker (1950) and Duck Pimples (1945).

=== Season 7 (1960–1961) ===
Episode #	Title	Original airdate	Notes
152	Rapids Ahead / Bear Country	October 16, 1960	Despite being split TV program with clear first and second half it was originally aired as part of the Adventureland. In the first half of the program A promotional "making-of" special for the film Ten Who Dared on the Colorado River In the second half the program the True-Life Adventures short Bear Country is featured.
153	El Bandido	October 30, 1960	Zorro, western TV mini-series, episode 01 of 4.
154	Adios El Cuchillo	November 6, 1960	Zorro, western TV mini-series, episode 02 of 4.
155	Donald's Silver Anniversary	November 13, 1960	Animated Episode (Donald Duck at Disney Studio); Hosted by Walt Disney and nameless narrator The celebration of Donald's 25th anniversary with Walt Disney studio. Archival clips from the following theatrical shorts were included: Clock Cleaners (137), Grand Canyonscope (1954), Der Fuehrer's Face (1942), Donald Tire Trouble (1943) Saludos Amigos-Lake Titicaca (1943) and sequences from The Three Caballeros (1944). Although it features original animation, the episode lacks a single narrative continuity. Instead, this new footage is used to expand on existing animated shorts.
156	Moochie of Pop Warner Football: Pee Wee Versus City Hall	November 20, 1960	Sports Comedy TV film in two parts. Moochie's second story arch.
157	Moochie of Pop Warner Football: From Ticonderoga to Disneyland	November 27, 1960	Sports Comedy TV film in two parts. Moochie's second story arch.
158	The Warrior's Path	December 4, 1960	Daniel Boone, western TV mini-series, episode 01 of 4.
159	And Chase the Buffalo	December 11, 1960	Daniel Boone, western TV mini-series, episode 02 of 4.
160	Escape to Paradise / Water Birds	December 18, 1960	Despite being split TV program with clear first and second half it was originally aired as part of the Adventureland. In the first half of the program A promotional "making-of" special for the film Swiss Family Robinson, showing production on the island of Tobago. In the second half the program the True-Life Adventures short Water Birds if featured.
161	The Postponed Wedding	January 1, 1961	Zorro, western TV mini-series, episode 03 of 4.
162	A Woman's Courage	January 8, 1961	The Swamp Fox, western TV mini-series, episode 07 of 8.
163	Horses for Greene	January 15, 1961	The Swamp Fox, western TV mini-series, episode 08 of 8.
164	A Salute to Father	January 22, 1961	Animated episode Hosted by Goofy; Compilation episode which includes the following theatrical shorts: Get Rich Quick (1951), How To Dance (1953), Fathers Are People (1951), Father's Day Off (1953), Cold War (1951), No Smoking (1951), Tomorrow We Diet (1951), Father's Weekend (1953); Also known as Goofy's Salute to Father.
165	End of the Trail	January 29, 1961	Texas John Slaughter, western TV mini-series, episode 14 of 17.
166	A Holster Full of Law	February 5, 1961	Texas John Slaughter, western TV mini-series, episode 15 of 17.
167	Ambush at Wagon Gap	February 19, 1961	Western Feature film Westward Ho the Wagons! from 1956, serialized in two parts. Parts were not officially connected under an alternative title, but where aired back to back.
168	White Man's Medicine	February 26, 1961	Western Feature film Westward Ho the Wagons! from 1956, serialized in two parts. Parts were not officially connected under an alternative title, but where aired back to back.
169	The Coyote's Lament	March 5, 1961	Animated episode Hosted by Pluto's nemesis Bent-Tail; Compilation episode which includes the following theatrical shorts: Pests of the West (1950), Camp Dog (1950) Primitive Pluto (1950), Sheep Dog (1949), The Legend of Coyote Rock (1945)). Thirty years later, this film is then remade as Disney's Coyote Tales. The film was directed by Robert Heath, and premiered on the Disney Channel on 24 March 1991.
170	The Wilderness Road	March 12, 1961	Daniel Boone, western TV mini-series, episode 03 of 4.
171	The Promised Land	March 19, 1961	Daniel Boone, western TV mini-series, episode 04 of 4.
172	Auld Acquaintance	April 2, 1961	Zorro, western TV mini-series, episode 04 of 4.
173	Battle for Survival	April 9, 1961	Nature Fantasy Feature film. Condensed version of True Life Adventures Feature film Secrets of Life.
174	Trip to Tucson	April 16, 1961	Texas John Slaughter, western TV mini-series, episode 16 of 17.
175	Frank Clell's in Town	April 23, 1961	Texas John Slaughter, western TV mini-series, episode 17 of 17.
176	Flash, the Teen-age Otter	April 30, 1961	Nature Survival TV film. Conservation of an Otter.
177	Andrews' Raiders: Secret Mission	May 7, 1961	Western Feature film The Great Locomotive Chase from 1956, serialized in two parts. Parts were officially connected under an alternative title.
178	Andrews' Raiders: Escape to Nowhere	May 14, 1961	Western Feature film The Great Locomotive Chase from 1956, serialized in two parts. Parts were officially connected under an alternative title.
179	Wonders of the Water Worlds	May 21, 1961	Nature Fantasy TV film.
180	Disneyland '61 / The Olympic Elk	May 28, 1961	Despite being split TV program with clear first and second half it was originally aired as part of the Adventureland. In the first half of the program Walt Disney introduces the latest from the Disneyland theme Park, The Disneyland portion use an animated diagram of the monorail. In the second half the program the True-Life Adventures short The Olympic Elk if featured.
181	The Title Makers / Nature's Half Acre	June 11, 1961	Despite being split TV program with clear first and second half it was originally aired as part of the Adventureland. In the first half of the program Walt Disney introduces the Title Department, which they're producing the opening titles for 1961 film The Parent Trap In the second half the program the True-Life Adventures short Nature's Half Acre if featured. Final episode to be broadcast in black-and-white. Final episode to air on ABC until show's revival in 1986.

== Walt Disney's Wonderful World of Color episodes ==
Note: The show was moved from ABC to NBC in order to be able to broadcast the show in color.

=== Season 8 (1961–1962) ===
Episode #	Title	Original airdate	Notes
182	An Adventure in Color/Mathmagicland	September 24, 1961	Animated Episode; First appearance of Ludwig Von Drake, who host brand new segment on color. and to feature the new song "The Spectrum Song" by the Sherman Brothers. The second half is a Compilation episode which includes the following theatrical Educational featurette: Donald Duck in Mathmagicland (1959). First episode to air on NBC, to be broadcast in color.
183	The Horsemasters: Follow Your Heart	October 1, 1961	Nature Survival TV film, in two parts. Equestrian story
184	The Horsemasters: Tally Ho	October 8, 1961	Nature Survival TV film, in two parts. Equestrian story
185	Chico, the Misunderstood Coyote	October 15, 1961	Nature Survival TV film. Self conservation effort of a coyote.
186	The Hunting Instinct	October 22, 1961	Animated Episode; Hosted by Ludwig Von Drake. Compilation episode which includes the following theatrical shorts: Bootle Beetle (1947) The Pointer (1939) Clown Of The Jungle (1947) The Lone Chipmunks (1954) The Plastics Inventor (1944) The Fox Hunt (1938) No Hunting (1955). Reissued as Man's Huning Instinct (1982) with altered shorts.
187	Inside Donald Duck	November 5, 1961	Animated Episode; Hosted by Ludwig Von Drake. Compilation episode which includes the following theatrical shorts: Donald's Diary (1954) Donald's Crime (1945) Drip Dippy Donald (1948) Donald's Dream Voice (1948) Donald's Double Trouble (1946) Donald's Dilemma (1947) and Cured Duck (1945)
188	The Light in the Forest	November 12, 1961	Western Feature film form 1958. A serialized version in two parts.
189	The Light in the Forest	November 19, 1961	Western Feature film form 1958. A serialized version in two parts.
190	Holiday for Henpecked Husbands	November 26, 1961	Animated episode. NOT hosted by Ludwig Von Drake, its hosted by Goofy. . (Note: Episode was produced prior to creation of Ludwig Von Drake and show's move from ABC to NBC, his absence is explained in Walt's intro with additional new footage in the opening monologue.); Compilation episode which includes the following theatrical shorts: Hello Aloha (1952), For Whom The Bulls Toil (1953), How To Be A Detective (1952), Tiger Trouble (1945), A Knight For A Day (1946), How To Play Baseball (1942) and Two Gun Goofy (1952). Also known as Goofy Takes a Holiday.
191	A Fire Called Jeremiah	December 3, 1961	Nature Survival TV film. The dangers of forest fires and its preventions. Footage from this episode was later reused in Fire on Kelly Mountain (1973).
192	Kids Is Kids	December 10, 1961	Animated episode also known as Donald Duck Quacks Up; Hosted by Ludwig Von Drake. Compilation episode which includes the following theatrical shorts: Donald's Happy Birthday (1949), The Hockey Champ (1939), Good Scouts (1938), Don's Fountain Of Youth (1953), Soup's On (1948) and Lucky Number (1951). Also known as Donald Duck Quacks Up. Reissued as Mickey and Donald Kidding Around (1983) with altered shorts.
193	Backstage Party	December 17, 1961	Behind the scenes Episode. Walt Disney takes viewers on a rare drive-through tour of the actual Burbank studio as filming for Babes in Toyland (1961) the episode includes stop-motion sequences March of the Toys which was originally part of the feature film.
194	Hans Brinker, or The Silver Skates	January 7, 1962	Historical Drama TV film, in two parts. Based on the eponymous novel of same name.
195	Hans Brinker, or The Silver Skates	January 14, 1962	Historical Drama TV film, in two parts. Based on the eponymous novel of same name.
196	Sancho, the Homing Steer: Sancho on the Rancho...and Elsewhere	January 21, 1962	Nature Survival TV film, in two parts. Self conservation of a steer, the set in 19th century.
197	Sancho, the Homing Steer: The Perils of a Homesick Steer	January 28, 1962	Nature Survival TV film, in two parts. Self conservation of a steer, the set in 19th century.
198	Fantasy on Skis	February 4, 1962	A Fantasy drama TV film. Set in the alps, a condensed version was released theatrically in 1975 with a reissue of Snowball Express.
199	Comanche	February 18, 1962	Western Feature film Tonka form 1958, A serialized version in two parts.
200	Comanche	February 25, 1962	Western Feature film Tonka form 1958, A serialized version in two parts.
201	Carnival Time	March 4, 1962	Animated and Live-action episode Hosted by Ludwig Von Drake. The live-action parts of the show were originally filmed on location in New Orleans and Rio de Janeiro (Brazil) with production value similar to People & Places series.
202	The Prince and the Pauper: The Pauper King	March 11, 1962	Historical Drama TV film in, three parts. Based on the eponymous novel of same name.
203	The Prince and the Pauper: The Merciful Law of the King	March 18, 1962	Historical Drama TV film in, three parts. Based on the eponymous novel of same name.
204	The Prince and the Pauper: Long Live the Rightful King	March 25, 1962	Historical Drama TV film in, three parts. Based on the eponymous novel of same name.
205	Spy in the Sky	April 1, 1962	Tomorrowland episode featuring, behind the curtains look at the Sci-fi feature film Moon Pilot which was then still in production and the second half features Theatrical featurette Eyes in Outer Space (1959).
206	Von Drake in Spain	April 8, 1962	Animated and Live-action episode Hosted by Ludwig Von Drake. The live-action parts of the show were originally filmed on location in Spain with production value similar to People & Places series.
207	Disneyland After Dark	April 15, 1962	Theme Park episode Features the television debut of The Osmond Brothers.

=== Season 9 (1962–1963) ===
Episode #	Title	Original airdate	Notes
208	The Golden Horseshoe Revue	September 23, 1962	Theme Park Episode; This episode is set in the Disneyland theme park as stage show in the Frontierland section of the Theme Park, and introduced by Walt Disney as such.
209	Escapade in Florence	September 30, 1962	A Comedy Mystery TV film, in two parts.
210	Escapade in Florence	October 7, 1962	A Comedy Mystery TV film, in two parts.
211	The Silver Fox and Sam Davenport	October 14, 1962	Nature Survival TV film. Farmers track down Endangering fox
212	Man Is His Own Worst Enemy	October 21, 1962	Animated episode Hosted by Ludwig Von Drake. Compilation episode which includes the following theatrical shorts: Reason And Emotion (1943), Chicken Little (1943), How To Have An Accident In The Home (1956), How To Have An Accident At Work (1959), and Motor Mania (1950). Also Uses archival clips from the True-Life Adventures; Also known as Ducking Disaster with Donald and His Friends.
213	Sammy, the Way-Out Seal	October 28, 1962	Nature Survival TV film, in two parts. Conservation of a seal.
214	Sammy, the Way-Out Seal	November 4, 1962	Nature Survival TV film, in two parts. Conservation of a seal.
215	The Magnificent Rebel	November 18, 1962	A biographical Drama TV film in two parts. Which is a dramatize the life of Viennese composer Ludwig van Beethoven
216	The Magnificent Rebel	November 25, 1962	A biographical Drama TV film in two parts. Which is a dramatize the life of Viennese composer Ludwig van Beethoven
217	The Mooncussers: Graveyard of Ships	December 2, 1962	A Historical Drama TV film in two parts.
218	The Mooncussers: Wake of Disaster	December 9, 1962	A Historical Drama TV film in two parts.
219	Hurricane Hannah	December 16, 1962	Nature Survival TV film. the story of the Metrology hurricane season, documented with cooperation of the U.S. Weather Bureau National Hurricane Center.
220	Holiday Time at Disneyland	December 23, 1962	Theme Park episode. Set during the holiday.
221	Three Tall Tales	January 6, 1963	Animated Episode; Hosted by Ludwig Von Drake. Compilation episode which includes the following theatrical shorts: Casey Bats Again (1954), The Saga of Windwagon Smith (1961) and Paul Bunyan (1958).
222	Little Dog Lost	January 13, 1963	Nature Survival TV film. Conservation of a lost Corgi (dog).
223	Johnny Shiloh	January 20, 1963	Western TV film in two parts. Based on true story of John Clem general officer who served as a drummer boy in the Union Army during the American Civil War
224	Johnny Shiloh	January 27, 1963	Western TV film in two parts. Based on true story of John Clem general officer who served as a drummer boy in the Union Army during the American Civil War
225	Greta, the Misfit Greyhound	February 3, 1963	Nature Survival TV film. A conservation of a Greyhound.
226	Inside Outer Space	February 10, 1963	Animated TV episode Hosted by Ludwig Von Drake. Reuses the Animated footage from Tomorrowland episodes Man in Space (1955 TV), Man and the Moon (1955 TV) and Mars and Beyond (1957 TV).
227	Banner in the Sky: To Conquer the Mountain	February 17, 1963	Nature Survival Feature Film Third Man on the Mountain from 1959, serialized in two parts, with alternated titles. The Dangerous sport of mountaineering becomes a race to the finish line.
228	Banner in the Sky: The Killer Mountain	February 24, 1963	Nature Survival Feature Film Third Man on the Mountain from 1959, serialized in two parts, with alternated titles. The Dangerous sport of mountaineering becomes a race to the finish line.
229	A Square Peg in a Round Hole	March 3, 1963	Animated episode Hosted by Ludwig Von Drake; Compilation episode which includes the following theatrical shorts: Beezy Bear (1955), How To Sleep (1953), Aquamania (1961), The Litterbug (1961) and In The Bag (1956). Later aired on the anthology series as Goofing Around with Donald Duck.
230	The Horse with the Flying Tail	March 10, 1963	Nature Survival film. Equestrian story Originally released as theatrical documentary featurette.
231	Kidnapped	March 17, 1963	A Historical Drama feature film from 1960, serialized version in two parts.
232	Kidnapped	March 24, 1963	A Historical Drama feature film from 1960, serialized version in two parts.

=== Season 10 (1963–1964) ===
Episode #	Title	Original airdate	Notes
233	The Horse Without a Head: The 100,000,000 Franc Train Robbery	September 29, 1963	A Comedy Mystery TV film in two parts. Rodeo toy is used to hide away stolen property from a loot.
234	The Horse Without a Head: The Key to the Cache	October 6, 1963	A Comedy Mystery TV film in two parts. Rodeo toy is used to hide away stolen property from a loot.
235	Fly With Von Drake	October 13, 1963	Animated TV episode Hosted by Ludwig Von Drake. Reuses footage from the documentary feature Victory Through Air Power (1942) and Tomorrowland episodes "Mars And Beyond" (1957 TV) and "Man in Flight" (1957 TV) and "Man In Space" (1955 TV)
236	The Wahoo Bobcat	October 20, 1963	Nature Survival TV film. Conservation of a bobcat.
237	The Waltz King	October 27, 1963	A biographical Drama TV film in two parts. Which is a dramatize the life of Viennese composer Johann Strauss Jr.
238	The Waltz King	November 3, 1963	A biographical Drama TV film in two parts. Which is a dramatize the life of Viennese composer Johann Strauss Jr.
239	The Truth About Mother Goose	November 17, 1963	Animated episode Hosted by Ludwig Von Drake; Compilation episode which includes the following theatrical shorts: The Truth About Mother Goose (1957) and Fun and Fancy Free/Mickey and the Beanstalk (1947)
240	The Hound That Thought He Was a Raccoon	November 24, 1963	Nature Survival film. Conservation of A Hound lost in the woods. originally released in theaters in 1960 as featurette.
241	Pollyanna	December 1, 1963	A Comedy Drama Feature film from 1960, serialized version in three parts.
242	Pollyanna	December 8, 1963	A Comedy Drama Feature film from 1960, serialized version in three parts.
243	Pollyanna	December 15, 1963	A Comedy Drama Feature film from 1960, serialized version in three parts.
244	From All of Us to All of You #2	December 22, 1963	Animated episode Reedited version of From All of US to All of You, Archival footage only. Features a "surprise gift": a sneak peek of The Sword in the Stone. Walt presented the surprise gift.
245	The Ballad of Hector the Stowaway Dog: Where the Heck is Hector?	January 5, 1964	Comedy Drama TV film, in two parts. A sailor unwillingly gets mixed up in a jewel robbery, with the jewels hidden inside dog's collar. Theatrically released overseas as The Million Dollar Collar.
246	The Ballad of Hector the Stowaway Dog: Who the Heck is Hector?	January 12, 1964	Comedy Drama TV film, in two parts. A sailor unwillingly gets mixed up in a jewel robbery, with the jewels hidden inside dog's collar. Theatrically released overseas as The Million Dollar Collar.
247	Mediterranean Cruise	January 19, 1964	Animated and Live-action episode Hosted by Ludwig Von Drake. Reuses footage from People & Places Series.
248	Bristle Face	January 26, 1964	Neo-Western TV film, in two parts. Also known as Fox Hunter.
249	Bristle Face	February 2, 1964	Neo-Western TV film, in two parts. Also known as Fox Hunter.
250	The Scarecrow of Romney Marsh	February 9, 1964	Historical Drama TV film in three parts. Theatrically released overseas as Dr. Syn, Alias the Scarecrow.
251	The Scarecrow of Romney Marsh	February 16, 1964	Historical Drama TV film in three parts. Theatrically released overseas as Dr. Syn, Alias the Scarecrow.
252	The Scarecrow of Romney Marsh	February 23, 1964	Historical Drama TV film in three parts. Theatrically released overseas as Dr. Syn, Alias the Scarecrow.
253	The Legend of Two Gypsy Dogs	March 1, 1964	A Nature Survival TV film. Combination sequences of two foreign Theatrical releases from Hungary, Jolly Dogs II – Through Valleys and Mountains (1960) and Jolly Dogs I – Wind in the Reeds (1958) with new narration including a new animation of pencil drawing a map of Europe.
254	For the Love of Willadean: A Taste of Melon	March 8, 1964	A Comedy mystery TV film, in two parts.
255	For the Love of Willadean: Treasure in the Haunted House	March 15, 1964	A Comedy mystery TV film, in two parts.
256	In Shape With Von Drake	March 22, 1964	Animated episode Hosted by Ludwig Von Drake; Compilation episode which includes the following theatrical shorts The Art Of Self Defense (1941), The Olympic Champ (1942), Goofy Gymnastics (1949), How To Swim (1942), How To Play Golf (1944), How To Play Football (1944).
257	Greyfriars Bobby	March 29, 1964	Nature survival feature film from 1960. A serialized version in two parts. Conservation of stray dog who guarded the grave of his master, set in the 19th century and based on a true story.
258	Greyfriars Bobby	April 5, 1964	Nature survival feature film from 1960. A serialized version in two parts. Conservation of stray dog who guarded the grave of his master, set in the 19th century and based on a true story.
259	Jungle Cat	April 12, 1964	Nature fantasy Feature film. Originally released to theaters in 1960. A condensed version of the 1960 film. True-Life Adventures.
260	Disneyland Goes to the World's Fair	May 17, 1964	Theme Park Episode; Includes an animated sequence The History of Fairs.

=== Season 11 (1964–1965) ===
Episode #	Title	Original airdate	Notes
262	Nikki, Wild Dog of the North	September 27, 1964	Nature Survival feature film form 1961. A serialized version in two parts. Conservation of a bear cub and dog lost in wilderness separated from his owner.
263	Nikki, Wild Dog of the North	October 4, 1964	Nature Survival feature film form 1961. A serialized version in two parts. Conservation of a bear cub and dog lost in wilderness separated from his owner.
264	A Rag, a Bone, a Box of Junk	October 11, 1964	Animated episode Archival clips from the following theatrical shorts were included: Noah's Ark (1959) and A Symposium on Popular Songs (1962), both of which were fully animated and part animated with stop-motion. Although it features heavy use of original animation, the episode lacks a single continuous storyline. Instead, the new animation is used to expand upon scenes from the included shorts, rahter than connecting them.
265	The Tenderfoot	October 18, 1964	The Tenderfoot, western TV mini-series, episode 01 of 3
266	The Tenderfoot	October 25, 1964	The Tenderfoot, western TV mini-series, episode 02 of 3
267	The Tenderfoot	November 1, 1964	The Tenderfoot, western TV mini-series, episode 03 of 3
268	One Day at Teton Marsh	November 8, 1964	Nature Fantasy TV film. Set in Grand Teton National Park
269	Ben and Me / Peter and the Wolf	November 15, 1964	Animated episodes Reuses the animated footage from earlier ABC episodes The Fourth Anniversary show (1957, TV) and The Liberty Story (1957, TV); No original content was produced for this episode.
270	Toby Tyler	November 22, 1964	A Comedy Drama Feature film from 1960, A serialized version in two parts.
271	Toby Tyler	November 29, 1964	A Comedy Drama Feature film from 1960, A serialized version in two parts.
272	Big Red	December 6, 1964	Nature Survival film feature film form 1962. A serialized version in two parts. Conservation of an Irish setter (dog bread) against owner and wild Cougar.
273	Big Red	December 13, 1964	Nature Survival film feature film form 1962. A serialized version in two parts. Conservation of an Irish setter (dog bread) against owner and wild Cougar.
274	Disneyland 10th Anniversary	January 3, 1965	Theme Park Episode
275	Ida, the Offbeat Eagle	January 10, 1965	Nature Survival TV film. Conservation of an Eagle.
276	Gallegher	January 24, 1965	Gallegher, western TV mini-series, episode 01 of 12.
277	Gallegher	January 31, 1965	Gallegher, western TV mini-series, episode 02 of 12.
278	Gallegher	February 7, 1965	Gallegher, western TV mini-series, episode 03 of 12.
279	An Otter in the Family	February 21, 1965	Nature Survival TV film. Conservation of an Otter.
280	Almost Angels	February 28, 1965	A Comedy Drama Feature film from 1962, A serialized version in two parts.
281	Almost Angels	March 7, 1965	A Comedy Drama Feature film from 1962, A serialized version in two parts.
282	Kilroy	March 14, 1965	A Comedy-Mystery TV film in two parts. First Kilroy Story arch,
283	Kilroy	March 21, 1965	A Comedy-Mystery TV film in two parts. First Kilroy Story arch,
284	Kilroy	March 28, 1965	A Comedy-Drama TV film in two parts. Second Kilroy Story arch
285	Kilroy	April 4, 1965	A Comedy-Drama TV film in two parts. Second Kilroy Story arch

=== Season 12 (1965–1966) ===
Episode #	Title	Original airdate	Notes
286	Yellowstone Cubs	September 19, 1965	Nature Survival film. Conservation of a "dangerous bears." originally released in theaters in 1963 as featurette.
287	The Further Adventures of Gallegher: A Case of Murder	September 26, 1965	Gallegher, western TV mini-series, episode 04 of 12.
288	The Further Adventures of Gallegher: The Big Swindle	October 3, 1965	Gallegher, western TV mini-series, episode 05 of 12.
289	The Further Adventures of Gallegher: The Daily Press vs. City Hall	October 10, 1965	Gallegher, western TV mini-series, episode 06 of 12.
290	Flight of the White Stallions	October 17, 1965	Nature Survival feature film from 1962. A serialized version in two parts. Equestrian story. Originally released in theaters as Miracle of the White Stallions.
291	Flight of the White Stallions	October 24, 1965	Nature Survival feature film from 1962. A serialized version in two parts. Equestrian story. Originally released in theaters as Miracle of the White Stallions.
292	Minado the Wolverine	November 7, 1965	Nature Survival TV film. Trapper's Endangering of a wolverine with unfortunate outcome.
293	The Three Lives of Thomasina	November 14, 1965	A comedy Fantasy feature film from 1963, A serialized version in three parts.
294	The Three Lives of Thomasina	November 21, 1965	A comedy Fantasy feature film from 1963, A serialized version in three parts.
295	The Three Lives of Thomasina	November 28, 1965	A comedy Fantasy feature film from 1963, A serialized version in three parts.
296	Summer Magic	December 5, 1965	A Comedy drama musical feature film from 1963, serialized version in three parts.
297	Summer Magic	December 12, 1965	A Comedy drama musical feature film from 1963, serialized version in three parts.
298	A Country Coyote Goes Hollywood	December 19, 1965	Nature Survival feature film. Conservation of a Coyote. originally released in theaters.
299	Moon Pilot	January 16, 1966	A sci-fi feature film from 1962, serialized in two parts.
300	Moon Pilot	January 23, 1966	A sci-fi feature film from 1962, serialized in two parts.
301	Music for Everybody	January 30, 1966	Animated episode Hosted by Ludwig Von Drake. Compilation episode which includes the following theatrical shorts:Fantasia-Clair De Lune (unreleased), Make Mine Music-After You've Gone (1946), Make Mine Music-All the Cats Join (1946), Melody Time-Blame It on the Samba (1948) Make Mine Music-Two Silhouettes (1946) Make Mine Music-The Whale Who Wanted to Sing at the Met from Make Mine Music (1946); The Clair De Lune segment was replaced when the episode was re-broadcast with a sequence form Sleeping Beauty as promotion for its then upcoming theatrical re-run in 1970.
302	The Legend of Young Dick Turpin	February 13, 1966	Historical Drama TV film in two parts.
303	The Legend of Young Dick Turpin	February 20, 1966	Historical Drama TV film in two parts.
304	Ballerina	February 27, 1966	Drama TV film in two parts, filmed on location in Denmark; Also known as Ballerina: A Story of the Royal Danish Ballet and theatrically released overseas under this title.
305	Ballerina	March 6, 1966	Drama TV film in two parts, filmed on location in Denmark; Also known as Ballerina: A Story of the Royal Danish Ballet and theatrically released overseas under this title.
306	Run, Light Buck, Run	March 13, 1966	Nature Survival TV film. Conservation of an antelope.
307	A Tiger Walks	March 20, 1966	Nature Survival feature film from 1964, A serialized version in two parts.
308	A Tiger Walks	March 27, 1966	Nature Survival feature film from 1964, A serialized version in two parts.
309	Concho, the Coyote Who Wasn't	April 10, 1966	Nature Survival TV film. Conservation of a Coyote.

=== Season 13 (1966–1967) ===
Episode #	Title	Original airdate	Notes
310	Emil and the Detectives	September 11, 1966	A comedy Drama feature film from 1964, a serialized version in two parts.
311	Emil and the Detectives	September 18, 1966	A comedy Drama feature film from 1964, a serialized version in two parts.
312	The Legend of El Blanco	September 25, 1966	Nature Survival film. Equestrian story
313	Savage Sam	October 2, 1966	Western feature film from 1963, A serialized version in two parts.
314	Savage Sam	October 9, 1966	Western feature film from 1963, A serialized version in two parts.
315	The 101 Problems of Hercules	October 16, 1966	Nature survival TV film. Conservation of Sheepshearing in the 19th century.
316	Gallegher Goes West: Showdown with the Sundown Kid	October 23, 1966	Gallegher, western TV mini-series, episode 07 of 12.
317	Gallegher Goes West: Crusading Reporter	October 30, 1966	Gallegher, western TV mini-series, episode 08 of 12.
318	The Ranger's Guide to Nature	November 13, 1966	Animated TV episode First show hosted by Ranger J. Audubon Woodlore who had debuted in 1954, as supporting character in the Donald Duck theatrical shorts. uses archival clips from the True-Life Adventures
319	The Moon-Spinners	November 20, 1966	A Mystery feature film from 1964, A serialized version in three parts.
320	The Moon-Spinners	November 27, 1966	A Mystery feature film from 1964, A serialized version in three parts.
321	The Moon-Spinners	December 4, 1966	A Mystery feature film from 1964, A serialized version in three parts.
322	Joker, the Amiable Ocelot	December 11, 1966	Nature Survival TV film. Conservation of an Ocelot (a cat family member)
323	Disneyland Around the Seasons	December 18, 1966	Theme Park episode Broadcast three days after the death of Walt Disney, preceded by a memorial tribute from Dick Van Dyke and Chet Huntley.
324	Willie and the Yank: The Deserter	January 8, 1967	Western TV film in three parts. Released theatrically overseas as Mosby's Marauders.
325	Willie and the Yank: The Mosby Raiders	January 15, 1967	Western TV film in three parts. Released theatrically overseas as Mosby's Marauders.
326	Willie and the Yank: The Matchmaker	January 22, 1967	Western TV film in three parts. Released theatrically overseas as Mosby's Marauders.
327	Gallegher Goes West: Tragedy on the Trail	January 29, 1967	Gallegher, western TV mini-series, episode 09 of 12.
328	Gallegher Goes West: Trial by Terror	February 5, 1967	Gallegher, western TV mini-series, episode 10 of 12.
329	The Boy Who Flew with Condors	February 19, 1967	Nature Survival TV film. Learning new skills of flying inspired by the birds. Leslie Neilsen as narrator.
330	Atta Girl, Kelly!: K for Kelly	March 5, 1967	Nature Survival TV film, docufiction on the seeing eye dogs.
331	Atta Girl, Kelly!: Dog of Destiny	March 12, 1967	Nature Survival TV film, docufiction on the seeing eye dogs.
332	Atta Girl, Kelly!: Love is Blind" (or "The Seeing Eye)	March 19, 1967	Nature Survival TV film, docufiction on the seeing eye dogs.
333	Man on Wheels	March 26, 1967	Animated episode Hosted by Walt Disney throughout the program clips are shown from Magic Highway, U.S.A. (1958, TV), Donald and the Wheel (1961), Freewayphobia (1965), Goofy's Freeway Troubles (1965). No original animation was produced for this episode.
334	A Salute to Alaska	April 2, 1967	Nature Survival TV film Last episode to be originally introduced by Walt Disney, who had passed away four months earlier. The episode included brand new animated TV sequence on How Alaska Joined the World; The episode also reuses footage from People & Places series along with new material. Originally planned as a theatrical featurette. Some sources erroneously list this as Ludwig Von Drake episode despite him not appearing at all in the episode.

=== Season 14 (1967–1968) ===
Episode #	Title	Original airdate	Notes
335	The Tattooed Police Horse	September 10, 1967	Nature Survival film. Equestrian story Originally released as theatrical Featurette.
336	The Not So Lonely Lighthouse Keeper	September 17, 1967	Nature Survival TV film, Conservation effort of a Lighthouse Keeper on Anacapa Island and its wild life.
337	How the West Was Lost	September 24, 1967	Animated Episode; This third animated appearance of Oldtimer/Grandpappy/Rufus Duck who first appeared in the 1955 theatrical short No Hunting and in an earlier TV Episode "Your Host, Donald Duck". How the West Was Lost was the first and the only time the character was in the leading role, as the host of the program. Compilation episode which includes the following theatrical shorts Californy 'er Bust (1945), Two-Gun Goofy (1952), Saludos Amigos - El Gaucho Goofy (1942), Melody Time - Pecos Bill (1948); In 1990, footage of this program was reused, with redubbed dialogue, for a special on the Disney Channel called Disney's Rootin' Tootin' Roundup. Here, the Oldtimer was renamed to Saddlesore Sam, with his voice redubbed by Frank Welker.
338	The Fighting Prince of Donegal	October 1, 1967	A Historical Dram feature film from 1966, A serialized version in three parts.
339	The Fighting Prince of Donegal	October 8, 1967	A Historical Dram feature film from 1966, A serialized version in three parts.
340	The Fighting Prince of Donegal	October 15, 1967	A Historical Dram feature film from 1966, A serialized version in three parts.
341	Run, Appaloosa, Run	October 22, 1967	Nature Survival TV film. Equestrian story
342	One Day on Beetle Rock	November 19, 1967	Nature Survival TV film. Conservation efforts of Sequoia National Park of wild life an educational film titled A Day in Nature's Community, released in October 1975.
343	The Monkey's Uncle	November 26, 1967	A Comedy fantasy feature film from 1965, A serialized version in three parts.
344	The Monkey's Uncle	December 3, 1967	A Comedy fantasy feature film from 1965, A serialized version in three parts.
345	A Boy Called Nuthin'	December 10, 1967	Neo-Western TV film, in two parts.
346	A Boy Called Nuthin'	December 17, 1967	Neo-Western TV film, in two parts.
347	From All of Us to All of You #3	December 24, 1967	Animated episode Reedited version of From All of US to All of You, Archival footage only. Features a "surprise gift": a sneak peek of The Jungle Book.
348	Way Down Cellar	January 7, 1968	Mystery Drama TV film, in two parts
349	Way Down Cellar	January 14, 1968	Mystery Drama TV film, in two parts
350	Disneyland: From the Pirates of the Caribbean to the World of Tomorrow	January 21, 1968	Theme Park Episode
351	Pablo and the Dancing Chihuahua	January 28, 1968	Neo-Western TV film, in two parts.
352	Pablo and the Dancing Chihuahua	February 4, 1968	Neo-Western TV film, in two parts.
353	My Family Is a Menagerie	February 11, 1968	Nature Survival TV film. Conservation of escaped domestic and circus animals.
354	The Young Loner	February 25, 1968	Neo-Western TV film, in two parts.
355	The Young Loner	March 3, 1968	Neo-Western TV film, in two parts.
356	Wild Heart	March 10, 1968	Nature Survival TV film. Conservation of a sea lion, red-tailed hawk and a seagull. Narrated by Leslie Nielsen
357	The Ranger of Brownstone	March 17, 1968	Animated episode Second show hosted by Ranger J. Audubon Woodlore; Compilation episode which includes the following theatrical shorts Grin and Bear It (1954), In the Bag (1956), Hooked Bear(1956), Rugged Bear (1953), Grand Canyonscope (1954) (replaced by Beezy Bear (1955) in the syndicated version) and Bearly Asleep (1955). Second show hosted by Ranger J. Audubon Woodlore; Also uses archival clips from the True-Life Adventures
358	The Mystery of Edward Sims: Part 1	March 31, 1968	Gallegher, western TV mini-series. Episode 11 of 12.
359	The Mystery of Edward Sims: Part 2	April 7, 1968	Gallegher, western TV mini-series. Episode 12 of 12.
360	Ten Who Dared	April 14, 1968	Western feature film from 1960 A condensed version.
361	Nature's Charter Tours	April 21, 1968	Animated TV episode Third show hosted by Ranger J. Audubon Woodlore uses archival clips from the True-Life Adventures

=== Season 15 (1968–1969) ===
Episode #	Title	Original airdate	Notes
362	The Legend of the Boy and the Eagle	September 15, 1968	Nature Survival film. A recounting of a Native American's Hopi legend. Originally released as theatrical featurette.
363	Boomerang, Dog of Many Talents	September 22, 1968	Western TV film in two parts, focusing on the history of turkey drive in the old west instead of typical cattle drive.
364	Boomerang, Dog of Many Talents	September 29, 1968The Secret of Boyne Castle	Western TV film in two parts, focusing on the history of turkey drive in the old west instead of typical cattle drive.
365	Pacifically Peeking	October 6, 1968	Animated TV episode The first and only animated appearance of Moby Duck, who Host this program. Reuses the animated "history-of-diving" sequence from Operation Undersea. Reuses footage from People & Places and True-Life Adventures Series.
366	Brimstone, the Amish Horse	October 27, 1968	Nature Survival TV film. Equestrian story
367	The Ugly Dachshund	November 3, 1968	A Comedy Feature film from 1966, A serialized version in two parts.
368	The Ugly Dachshund	November 10, 1968	A Comedy Feature film from 1966, A serialized version in two parts.
369	The Treasure of San Bosco Reef	November 24, 1968	Comedy Mystery TV film in two parts.
370	The Treasure of San Bosco Reef	December 1, 1968	Comedy Mystery TV film in two parts.
371	The Owl That Didn't Give a Hoot	December 15, 1968	Nature Survival TV film. Conservation of a great hornet owl.
372	The Mickey Mouse Anniversary Show	December 22, 1968	Companion Episode to The Mickey Mouse Club which celebrates Mickey's 40th birthday with showing various clips from his career. The Mickey Mouse club version of Mickey appears in new animation in the episode. The International release was also produced which removed all of the Mickey Mouse club live-action sequences.
373	Solomon, the Sea Turtle	January 5, 1969	Nature Survival TV film. Conservation and migratory habits of the green sea turtles. Renowned scientist starred as himself in this program.
374	Those Calloways	January 12, 1969	A Comedy drama feature film from 1965, A serialized version in three parts.
375	Those Calloways	January 19, 1969	A Comedy drama feature film from 1965, A serialized version in three parts.
376	Those Calloways	January 26, 1969	A Comedy drama feature film from 1965, A serialized version in three parts.
377	Pancho, the Fastest Paw in the West	February 2, 1969	Nature Survival TV film. Equestrian story
378	The Secret of Boyne Castle	February 9, 1969	Comedy Drama TV film in three parts. Also known as Spy-Busters. Released overseas as Guns in the Heather in theaters.
379	The Secret of Boyne Castle	February 16, 1969	Comedy Drama TV film in three parts. Also known as Spy-Busters. Released overseas as Guns in the Heather in theaters.
380	The Secret of Boyne Castle	February 23, 1969	Comedy Drama TV film in three parts. Also known as Spy-Busters. Released overseas as Guns in the Heather in theaters.
381	Nature's Better Built Homes	March 2, 1969	Animated TV episodes Fourth and final show hosted by Ranger J. Audubon Woodlore uses archival clips from the True-Life Adventures
382	Ride a Northbound Horse	March 16, 1969	Nature Survival TV film, in two parts. Equestrian story Set in the 19th century.
383	Ride a Northbound Horse	March 23, 1969	Nature Survival TV film, in two parts. Equestrian story Set in the 19th century.

== The Wonderful World of Disney episodes (first run) ==
At the start of the 16th season NBC rebranded the show as The Wonderful World of Disney.

=== Season 16 (1969–1970) ===
Episode #	Title	Original airdate	Notes
384	Wild Geese Calling	September 14, 1969	Nature Survival TV film. Conservation of Canadian gander.
385	My Dog, the Thief	September 21, 1969	Comedy Drama TV film, in two parts
386	My Dog, the Thief	September 28, 1969	Comedy Drama TV film, in two parts
387	The Feather Farm	October 26, 1969	Nature survival TV film. Farmers track down Endangering ostriches that ran away from the farm.
388	Charlie, the Lonesome Cougar	November 2, 1969	Nature Survival feature film from 1967, A serialized version in two parts. Conservation of a Cougar cub.
389	Charlie, the Lonesome Cougar	November 9, 1969	Nature Survival feature film from 1967, A serialized version in two parts. Conservation of a Cougar cub.
390	Varda, the Peregrine Falcon	November 16, 1969	Nature Survival TV film. Follows a female peregrine falcon from birth in Alaska through a roundabout migration to Florida, and conservation efforts by a falconer.
391	Secrets of the Pirates' Inn	November 23, 1969	Comedy Drama TV film, in two parts.
392	Secrets of the Pirates' Inn	November 30, 1969	Comedy Drama TV film, in two parts.
393	Inky the Crow	December 7, 1969	Nature survival TV film, conservation of a crow.
394	Babes in Toyland	December 21, 1969	A Comedy fantasy feature film from 1961, A serialized version in two parts.
395	Babes in Toyland	December 28, 1969	A Comedy fantasy feature film from 1961, A serialized version in two parts.
396	Bon Voyage!	January 11, 1970	A Comedy feature film from 1962, A serialized version in two parts.
397	Bon Voyage!	January 18, 1970	A Comedy feature film from 1962, A serialized version in two parts.
398	Bon Voyage!	January 25, 1970	A Comedy feature film from 1962, A serialized version in two parts.
399	Smoke	February 1, 1970	Neo-Western TV film in two parts.
400	Smoke	February 8, 1970	Neo-Western TV film in two parts.
401	Menace on the Mountain	March 1, 1970	Western TV film in two parts.
402	Menace on the Mountain	March 8, 1970	Western TV film in two parts.
403	Disneyland Showtime	March 22, 1970	Theme Park Episode; Features Kurt Russell, E. J. Peaker, and The Osmonds including Donny, with a preview of The Haunted Mansion.
404	Nature's Strangest Oddballs	March 29, 1970	Animated episode Final show Hosted by Ludwig Von Drake. Compilation episode which includes the following theatrical shorts: The Three Caballeros - The Cold-Blooded Penguin (1945) and ''The Three Caballeros - The Flying Gauchito (1945), Goliath II (1960). Also Uses archival clips from the True-Life Adventures

=== Season 17 (1970–1971) ===
Episode #	Title	Original airdate	Notes
405	Cristobalito, the Calypso Colt	September 13, 1970	Nature Survival TV film. Equestrian story
406	The Boy Who Stole the Elephant	September 20, 1970	Nature Survival TV film in two parts, Conservation of a Circus Elephant, in the late 19th century.
407	The Boy Who Stole the Elephant	September 27, 1970	Nature Survival TV film in two parts, Conservation of a Circus Elephant, in the late 19th century.
408	The Wacky Zoo of Morgan City	October 18, 1970	A Comedy Drama TV film in two parts. While the episode is set at zoo, its focal point is it administrator level.
409	The Wacky Zoo of Morgan City	October 25, 1970	A Comedy Drama TV film in two parts. While the episode is set at zoo, its focal point is it administrator level.
410	Snow Bear	November 1, 1970	Nature Survival TV film, in two parts. Indigenous peoples of the Arctic and conservation of a polar bear cub.
411	Snow Bear	November 8, 1970	Nature Survival TV film, in two parts. Indigenous peoples of the Arctic and conservation of a polar bear cub.
412	Monkeys, Go Home!	November 15, 1970	A Comedy feature film from 1967, A serialized version in two parts.
413	Monkeys, Go Home!	November 22, 1970	A Comedy feature film from 1967, A serialized version in two parts.
414	Hang Your Hat on the Wind	November 29, 1970	Nature Survival film from 1969. Equestrian story. Originally released as theatrical featurette film.
415	It's Tough to Be a Bird	December 13, 1970	Animated Episode; An expanded version of the 1969 Academy Award-winning featurette.
416	From All of Us to All of You #4	December 20, 1970	Animated Episode; Reedited version of From All of US to All of You, Archival footage only. Features a "surprise gift": a sneak peek of The Aristocats.
417	Three Without Fear: Lost on the Baja Peninsula	January 3, 1971	Nature Survival TV film part 1. Shipwrecked story
418	Three Without Fear: In the Land of Desert Whales	January 10, 1971	Nature Survival TV film part 2. Shipwrecked story
419	The Adventures of Bullwhip Griffin	January 17, 1971	Western feature film from 1967, A serialized version in three parts. Were Part 3 ends with the featurette Project Florida, a progress report on the forthcoming Walt Disney World.
420	The Adventures of Bullwhip Griffin	January 24, 1971	Western feature film from 1967, A serialized version in three parts. Were Part 3 ends with the featurette Project Florida, a progress report on the forthcoming Walt Disney World.
421	The Adventures of Bullwhip Griffin	January 31, 1971	Western feature film from 1967, A serialized version in three parts. Were Part 3 ends with the featurette Project Florida, a progress report on the forthcoming Walt Disney World.
422	Bayou Boy	February 7, 1971	TV film in two parts. also known as The Boy From Dead Man's Bayou and re-aired under that title.
423	Bayou Boy	February 14, 1971	TV film in two parts. also known as The Boy From Dead Man's Bayou and re-aired under that title.
424	Hamad and the Pirates	March 7, 1971	Nature survival TV film in two parts. Based on pearl diving a foundational element of Bahraini indigenous heritage. While the film has plot it didn't use any actual actors.
425	Hamad and the Pirates	March 14, 1971	Nature survival TV film in two parts. Based on pearl diving a foundational element of Bahraini indigenous heritage. While the film has plot it didn't use any actual actors.

=== Season 18 (1971–1972) ===
Episode #	Title	Original airdate	Notes
426	Charlie Crawfoot and the Coati Mundi	September 19, 1971	Nature Survival TV film. Conservation of Coati Mundi (a relative of the raccoon).
427	Hacksaw	September 26, 1971	Nature Survival TV film, in two parts. Equestrian story
428	Hacksaw	October 3, 1971	Nature Survival TV film, in two parts. Equestrian story
429	The Strange Monster of Strawberry Cove	October 31, 1971	A Comedy Mystery TV film, in two parts.
430	The Strange Monster of Strawberry Cove	November 7, 1971	A Comedy Mystery TV film, in two parts.
431	The Horse in the Gray Flannel Suit	November 14, 1971	A Comedy Feature Film form 1968, A serialized version in two parts.
432	The Horse in the Gray Flannel Suit	November 21, 1971	A Comedy Feature Film form 1968, A serialized version in two parts.
433	Lefty, the Dingaling Lynx	November 28, 1971	Nature Survival TV film, in two parts. Conservation of a Lynx
433	Lefty, the Dingaling Lynx	December 5, 1971	Nature Survival TV film, in two parts. Conservation of a Lynx
434	Disney on Parade	December 19, 1971	Theme Park Episode; Animation sequences Archival footage only Features highlights from the first edition of the arena show, videotaped in Adelaide, South Australia. Reuses clips from Disney features and shorts. No new animation was produced for this episode.
435	Mountain Born	January 9, 1972	Nature Survival TV film. Conservation of a Lamb.
436	The One and Only, Genuine, Original Family Band	January 23, 1972	A Western Feature film, A serialized version in two parts.
437	The One and Only, Genuine, Original Family Band	January 30, 1972	A Western Feature film, A serialized version in two parts.
438	Justin Morgan Had a Horse	February 6, 1972	Nature Survival TV film, in two parts. Based on the true story of the "Figure" horse, the foundation of the Morgan horse breed. Equestrian story
439	Justin Morgan Had a Horse	February 13, 1972	Nature Survival TV film, in two parts. Based on the true story of the "Figure" horse, the foundation of the Morgan horse breed. Equestrian story
440	The City Fox	February 20, 1972	Nature Survival TV film. Conservation of a Red Fox.
441	Chango, Guardian of the Mayan Treasure	March 19, 1972	Nature Survival TV film This episodes opens with animated sequence of pencil painting map of South America. Leading into live-action footage of South America and the lives of its indigenous peoples. Conservation of Spider-Monkeys.
442	Michael O'Hara the Fourth: To Trap a Thief	March 26, 1972	A Mystery Comedy TV film, part 1
442	Michael O'Hara the Fourth: "The Deceptive Detective."	March 26, 1972	A Mystery Comedy TV film, part 2
444	Dad, Can I Borrow the Car?	April 9, 1972	A Comedy featurette film form 1970, an extended version. The original film and the extended sequences use avant-garde film techniques throughout the program.

=== Season 19 (1972–1973) ===
Episode #	Title	Original	Notes
445	The Computer Wore Tennis Shoes	September 17, 1972	A comedy fantasy feature film from 1969, A serialized version.
446	The Computer Wore Tennis Shoes	September 24, 1972	A comedy fantasy feature film from 1969, A serialized version.
447	The Nashville Coyote	October 1, 1972	Nature Survival TV film. Conservation of Coyote
448	The High Flying Spy	October 22, 1972	Western TV film, in three parts.
449	The High Flying Spy	October 29, 1972	Western TV film, in three parts.
450	The High Flying Spy	November 5, 1972	Western TV film, in three parts.
451	Nosey, the Sweetest Skunk in the West	November 19, 1972	Nature Survival TV film. Conservation of a Skunk.
452	Chandar, the Black Leopard of Ceylon	November 26, 1972	Nature Survival TV film, in two parts. Both parts begin with animated maps of Sir Lanka. Conservation of a Leopard.
453	Chandar, the Black Leopard of Ceylon	December 3, 1972	Nature Survival TV film, in two parts. Both parts begin with animated maps of Sir Lanka. Conservation of a Leopard.
454	Salty, the Hijacked Harbor Seal	December 17, 1972	Nature Survival TV film. Conservation of seal.
455	The Mystery in Dracula's Castle	January 7, 1973	A Comedy Mystery TV film, in two parts.
456	The Mystery in Dracula's Castle	January 14, 1973	A Comedy Mystery TV film, in two parts.
457	50 Happy Years	January 21, 1973	Behind the Scenes Episode The episode featured archival clips from over 60 Disney films, from animated films to live-action films along with nature documentaries. This show commemorated the 50th anniversary of Walt Disney Productions, and featured a sneak peek of Robin Hood, which was then still in production.
458	Rascal	February 11, 1973	A Comedy Drama Feature Film from 1969, A serialized version in two parts.
459	Rascal	February 18, 1973	A Comedy Drama Feature Film from 1969, A serialized version in two parts.
460	Chester, Yesterday's Horse	March 4, 1973	Nature Survival TV film. Equestrian story
461	The Little Shepherd Dog of Catalina	March 11, 1973	Nature Survival TV film. A Collie dog is used to endangering wild gees
462	The Boy and the Bronc Buster	March 18, 1973	Western TV film, in two parts.
463	The Boy and the Bronc Buster	March 25, 1973	Western TV film, in two parts.
464	Call It Courage	April 1, 1973	Nature Survival TV film. Featuring the Polynesians of Hikueru

=== Season 20 (1973–1974) ===
Episode #	Title	Original airdate	Notes
465	The Barefoot Executive	September 16, 1973	A Comedy feature film from 1971, A serialized version in two parts
466	The Barefoot Executive	September 23, 1973	A Comedy feature film from 1971, A serialized version in two parts
467	Fire on Kelly Mountain	September 30, 1973	Nature Survival TV film. Reuses footage from earlier episode 1961 episode A Fire Called Jeremiah. Unlike the earlier episode this episode's dramatization instead of a Nature documentary on forest fires.
468	Mustang	October 7, 1973	Nature Survival TV film, in 2 parts. Conservation of mustang stallion horses. Equestrian story
469	Mustang	October 21, 1973	Nature Survival TV film, in 2 parts. Conservation of mustang stallion horses. Equestrian story
470	King of the Grizzlies	October 27, 1973	Nature Survival Feature film form 1970, A serialized version in two parts. Conservation of a Grizzly Bear
471	King of the Grizzlies	November 4, 1973	Nature Survival Feature film form 1970, A serialized version in two parts. Conservation of a Grizzly Bear
472	Run, Cougar, Run	November 25, 1973	Nature Survival Feature film form 1972, A serialized version in two parts. Conservation of mountain Lion.
473	Run, Cougar, Run	December 2, 1973	Nature Survival Feature film form 1972, A serialized version in two parts. Conservation of mountain Lion.
474	The Proud Bird from Shanghai	December 16, 1973	Nature Survival TV film. The story off Endangering of Chinese pheasants in local wild life of North America when they were set loose in Oregon.
475	From All of Us to All of You #5	December 23, 1973	Animated Episode; Reedited version of From All of US to All of You, Archival footage only. Features a "surprise gift": a sneak peek of Robin Hood.
476	The Whiz Kid and the Mystery at Riverton	January 6, 1974	A Comedy mystery TV film, in two parts.
477	The Whiz Kid and the Mystery at Riverton	January 13, 1974	A Comedy mystery TV film, in two parts.
478	Hogwild	January 20, 1974	Western TV film, in two parts.
479	Hogwild	January 27, 1974	Western TV film, in two parts.
480	Carlo, the Sierra Coyote	February 3, 1974	Nature Survival TV film. Conservation of a Coyote.
481	Ringo, the Refugee Raccoon	March 3, 1974	Nature Survival TV film. Survival TV film. Conservation of a Coyote.
482	Diamonds on Wheels	March 10, 1974	A Comedy mystery TV film, in three parts. Theatrically released overseas in 1973.
483	Diamonds on Wheels	March 17, 1974	A Comedy mystery TV film, in three parts. Theatrically released overseas in 1973.
484	Diamonds on Wheels	March 24, 1974	A Comedy mystery TV film, in three parts. Theatrically released overseas in 1973.
485	The Magic of Walt Disney World	March 31, 1974	Theme Park episode An expanded and updated version of the 1972 featurette.

=== Season 21 (1974–1975) ===
Episode #	Title	Original airdate	Notes
486	The Million Dollar Duck	September 15, 1974	A Comedy survival film from 1971, a serialized version in two parts.
487	The Million Dollar Duck	September 22, 1974	A Comedy survival film from 1971, a serialized version in two parts.
488	Shokee, the Everglades Panther	September 29, 1974	Nature survival TV film. conservation of a Panther.
489	Return of the Big Cat	October 6, 1974	Nature Survival TV film, in two parts. Farmers track down Endangering cougar with a wild dog. Set in the 19th century.
490	Return of the Big Cat	October 13, 1974	Nature Survival TV film, in two parts. Farmers track down Endangering cougar with a wild dog. Set in the 19th century.
491	Two Against the Arctic	October 20, 1974	Nature Survival TV film, in two parts. about Indigenous peoples of the Arctic.
492	Two Against the Arctic	October 27, 1974	Nature Survival TV film, in two parts. about Indigenous peoples of the Arctic.
493	Adventure in Satan's Canyon	November 3, 1974	Nature Survival TV film, in two parts. The dangerous sport of kayaking becomes a race to the finish line.
494	Runaway on the Rogue River	December 1, 1974	Nature Survival TV film. Conservation of a circus elephant. The elephant is named Barney.
495	Stub, the Best Cow Dog in the West	December 8, 1974	Nature Survival film, extended version of Cow Dog (1956) a theatrical featurette. Farmers track down Endangering wild Brahma bull with an Australian herding dog.
496	The Sky's the Limit	January 19, 1975	Nature Survival TV film in two parts. Learning new skills of flying inspired by the birds. Leslie Neilsen as narrator.
497	The Sky's the Limit	January 26, 1975	Nature Survival TV film in two parts. Learning new skills of flying inspired by the birds. Leslie Neilsen as narrator.
498	The Wild Country	February 23, 1975	Western feature film from 1970, A serialized version in two parts.
499	The Wild Country	March 2, 1975	Western feature film from 1970, A serialized version in two parts.
500	The Footloose Goose	March 9, 1975	Nature Survival TV film. Conservation of a wild goose.
501	Deacon, the High Noon Dog	March 16, 1975	Nature Survival TV film. A mongrel dog tracks down dangers from the dessert to OK Corral in Tombstone in the old west.
502	Welcome to the "World"	March 23, 1975	Theme Park episode

=== Season 22 (1975–1976) ===
Episode #	Title	Original airdate	Notes
503	The Boy Who Talked to Badgers	September 14, 1975	Northwestern TV film in 2 parts. Set in Canada.
504	The Boy Who Talked to Badgers	September 21, 1975	Northwestern TV film in 2 parts. Set in Canada.
505	The Outlaw Cats of Colossal Cave	September 28, 1975	Nature Survival TV film. Conservation of bobcats
506	The Secret of the Pond	October 5, 1975	Neo-Western TV film, in two parts
507	The Secret of the Pond	October 12, 1975	Neo-Western TV film, in two parts
508	Seems There Was This Moose	October 19, 1975	Nature survival TV film. Conservation of Moose.
509	Now You See Him, Now You Don't	October 26, 1975	A Comedy fantasy film from 1972, special 2-hour presentation.
510	Napoleon and Samantha	November 2, 1975	Nature survival feature film from 1972, A special 2-hour presentation. Conservation of Lion.
511	Twister, Bull from the Sky	January 4, 1976	Neo-Western TV film.
512	The Whiz Kid and the Carnival Caper	January 11, 1976	A Comedy mystery TV film, in two parts.
513	The Whiz Kid and the Carnival Caper	January 18, 1976	A Comedy mystery TV film, in two parts.
514	The Bears and I	February 1, 1976	Nature survival feature film from 1974, in two parts. Conservation of bear cubs. In Canada
515	The Bears and I	February 8, 1976	Nature survival feature film from 1974, in two parts. Conservation of bear cubs. In Canada
516	Superdad	February 15, 1976	A Comedy fantasy film from 1973, special 2-hour presentation.
517	The Survival of Sam the Pelican	February 29, 1976	Nature Survival TV film. Conservation of Pelican
518	The Flight of the Grey Wolf	March 14, 1976	Nature Survival TV film, in two parts. Conservation of captive wolf raised by humans.
519	The Flight of the Grey Wolf	March 21, 1976	Nature Survival TV film, in two parts. Conservation of captive wolf raised by humans.
520	The Parent Trap	May 16, 1976	A Comedy film from 1961, A special 2½-hour presentation.
521	Superstar Goofy	July 25, 1976	Animated episode Archival footage only which consist of the episodes The Goofy Sport Story and Goofy's Cavalcade of Sports are re-mixed into one, to coincide with the 1976 Summer Olympics. No new animation was produced for this program.

=== Season 23 (1976–1977) ===
Episode	Title	Original airdate	Notes
522	One Little Indian	September 26, 1976	Western feature film from 1973, A serialized version in 2 parts.
523	One Little Indian	October 3, 1976	Western feature film from 1973, A serialized version in 2 parts.
524	The Biscuit Eater	October 10, 1976	A Comedy drama feature film, A serialized version in two parts.
525	The Biscuit Eater	October 17, 1976	A Comedy drama feature film, A serialized version in two parts.
526	20,000 Leagues Under the Sea	October 24, 1976	A Comedy Fantasy film, A special 2-hour presentation.
527	The Secret of Old Glory Mine	October 31, 1976	Neo-Western TV episode.
528	The Apple Dumpling Gang	November 14, 1976	Western feature film from 1975, A special 2-hour presentation.
529	Disney's Greatest Dog Stars	November 28, 1976	Animated and Live-action Episode. Hosted by Dean Jones through All animated sequences are archival footage only, apart from Dean Jones segments the live-action bits are archival footage only. The original airing included a preview of Shaggy D.A. When the episode was re-aired in 1981 it included a preview of Fox and the Hound.
530	The Golden Dog	January 2, 1977	Neo-Western TV episode.
531	Kit Carson and the Mountain Men	January 9, 1977	Western TV film, in two parts.
532	Kit Carson and the Mountain Men	January 16, 1977	Western TV film, in two parts.
533	Barry of the Great St. Bernard	January 30, 1977	Nature Survival TV film in two parts. Set in the Swiss Alps. Based on truth story.
534	Barry of the Great St. Bernard	February 6, 1977	Nature Survival TV film in two parts. Set in the Swiss Alps. Based on truth story.
535	Go West, Young Dog	February 20, 1977	Western TV episode.
536	The Strongest Man in the World	February 27, 1977	A Comedy Fantasy film, A serialized version in two parts.
537	The Ghost of Cypress Swamp	March 13, 1977	Neo-Western TV film, A special 2-hour presentation.
538	The Track of the African Bongo	April 3, 1977	Nature Survival TV film in two parts. Set in Kenya and centers on the Kikuyu tribe and the rare African bongo antelope.
539	The Track of the African Bongo	April 10, 1977	Nature Survival TV film in two parts. Set in Kenya and centers on the Kikuyu tribe and the rare African bongo antelope.
540	The Castaway Cowboy	May 8, 1977	Western feature film from 1974, A special 2-hour presentation
541	Disney's Greatest Villains	May 15, 1977	Animated Episode; Archival footage only as the episode is re-edited version of Our Unsung Villains. such as using all of the live-action bridge sequences featuring Hans Conried as the slave in the Magic Mirror. Features a sneak peek of The Rescuers.
542	The Bluegrass Special	May 22, 1977	Nature Survival TV film. Equestrian story

=== Season 24 (1977–1978) ===
Episode #	Title	Original airdate	Notes
543	Gus	September 18, 1977	A Comedy sports feature film from 1976, A special 2-hour presentation.
544	Treasure of Matecumbe	October 2, 1977	Western feature film from 1976, A special 2 hour presentation.
545	Charley and the Angel	October 16, 1977	A Comedy fantasy feature film from 1973, A special 2-hour presentation.
546	The Incredible Journey	October 23, 1977	Nature fantasy feature film from 1963, a special 2-hour presentation. In the northwestern Ontario Canadian wilderness. group of domestic animals are in search of their owners.
547	Halloween Hall o' Fame	October 30, 1977	Animated and Live-action Episode. hosted by Jonathan Winters (dressed as night watchman/Jack-o'-lantern); Archival clips from the following theatrical shorts were included:Trick or Treat (1952), Lonesome Ghosts (1937) Pluto's Judgement Day (1935) The Adventures of Ichabod and Mr. Toad-The Legend of Sleepy Hollow (1949); No original animation was produced for this episode.
548	The Mouseketeers at Walt Disney World	November 20, 1977	Companion Episode to The New Mickey Mouse Club, several cast members have misadventure and go missing throughout the episode.
549	From All of Us to All of You #6	December 25, 1977	Animated episode Reedited version of From All of US to All of You, Archival footage only. Features a "surprise gift": a sneak peek of Pete's Dragon.
550	Three on the Run	January 8, 1978	Comedy drama, TV film.
551	Journey to the Valley of the Emu	January 22, 1978	Nature Survival TV film. Set in Australian Outback.
552	The Shaggy Dog	January 29, 1978	A Comedy fantasy feature film from 1973, A special 2-hour presentation.
553	The Million Dollar Dixie Deliverance	February 5, 1978	Western TV film, A special 2-hour presentation.
554	Race for Survival	March 5, 1978	Nature Survival TV film. Lost on the East African plains, man's best friend in search of his master
555	Trail of Danger	March 12, 1978	Neo-Western TV film, in two parts.
556	Trail of Danger	March 19, 1978	Neo-Western TV film, in two parts.
557	Mixed Nuts	March 26, 1978	Animated episode footage archival only. Alternate title of The Adventures of Chip 'n' Dale.
558	Child of Glass	May 14, 1978	Comedy Fantasy TV film, A special 2-hour presentation
559	The Young Runaways	May 28, 1978	Comedy Drama TV film, A special 2-hour presentation
560	A Tale of Two Critters	June 4, 1978	Nature fantasy featurette film. Featuring Wildlife only. Originally released in theaters.

=== Season 25 (1978–1979) ===
Episode #	Title	Original airdate	Notes
562	NBC Salutes the 25th Anniversary of The Wonderful World of Disney	September 13, 1978	Fantasy Comedy TV film Ron Howard and Suzanne Somers served as hosts for the special. Various live-action comedy sketches are featured throughout the show Various archival clips from animated shorts and features are included in the program This was the first of two episodes dedicated to Anthologies series 25th anniversary.
563	NBC Salutes the 25th Anniversary of The Wonderful World of Disney - Part 2 (Dumbo 2 Hour format)	September 17, 1978	Animated episode Archival footage only The second week was a 2-hour presentation that featured a complete showing of Dumbo, plus highlights from Snow White and the Seven Dwarfs, Pinocchio and Cinderella, and clips from various cartoons. This was the second of two episodes dedicated to Anthologies series 25th anniversary.
564	The Shaggy D.A.	September 24, 1978	Comedy fantasy feature film from 1976, A special 2-hour presentation.
565	In Search of the Castaways	October 1, 1978	Nature survival feature film from 1962, A serialized version in 2 parts. Shipwrecked story
566	In Search of the Castaways	October 8, 1978	Nature survival feature film from 1962, A serialized version in 2 parts. Shipwrecked story
567	The Gnome-Mobile	October 29, 1978	Comedy fantasy feature film from 1967, A serialized version, in 2 parts.
568	The Gnome-Mobile	November 5, 1978	Comedy fantasy feature film from 1967, A serialized version, in 2 parts.
569	The Boatniks	November 12, 1978	Comedy feature film from 1970, A special 2-hour presentation
570	Mickey's 50	November 19, 1978	Animated Episode; All traditional animation in the episode is archival footage only. Mike Jittlov's stop-motion Mickey Mouse shorts make their debut in this TV special: "The Collector", "Rat Race" and "Mouse Mania; A special 90-minute presentation.
571	Christmas at Walt Disney World	December 10, 1978	Theme Park episode.
572	Donovan's Kid	January 7, 1979	Western TV film, in two parts.
573	Donovan's Kid	January 14, 1979	Western TV film, in two parts.
574	Shadow of Fear	January 28, 1979	Fantasy comedy drama TV film, in two parts.
575	Shadow of Fear	February 4, 1979	Fantasy comedy drama TV film, in two parts.
576	Ride a Wild Pony	February 11, 1979	Nature survival feature film from 1975, A serialized version in 2 parts. Set in a small Australian town during the interwar period.
577	Ride a Wild Pony	February 18, 1979	Nature survival feature film from 1975, A serialized version in 2 parts. Set in a small Australian town during the interwar period.
578	Never a Dull Moment	March 4, 1979	Comedy heist feature film from 1968, A special 2-hour presentation.
579	The Omega Connection	March 18, 1979	Mystery Drama TV film. A TV special 2-hour presentation.
580	Born to Run	March 25, 1979	Nature Survival TV film in two parts. Set in a small Australian town in 1911; First released in 1977 as theatrical feature film in England. Equestrian story
581	Born to Run	April 1, 1979	Nature Survival TV film in two parts. Set in a small Australian town in 1911; First released in 1977 as theatrical feature film in England. Equestrian story
582	The Sky Trap	May 13, 1979	Mystery drama TV film. A special 2-hour presentation.

== Disney's Wonderful World episodes ==
At the start of the 26th season NBC rebranded the show as Disney's Wonderful World.

=== Season 26 (1979–1980) ===
Episode #	Title	Original airdate	Notes
583	The Absent-Minded Professor	September 9, 1979	Sci-fi feature film from 1961. A serialized version in two parts.
584	The Absent-Minded Professor	September 16, 1979	Sci-fi feature film from 1961. A serialized version in two parts.
585	The Love Bug	September 23, 1979	A comedy fantasy film from 1968. A special 2-hour presentation.
586	Baseball Fever	October 14, 1979	Animated Episode; Archival footage only
587	Major Effects	December 16, 1979	Animation & Live-action Behind the Scenes Episode. An exploration of special effects including combining Animation with Live-Action. it also included The Wizard of Speed and Time (1979) as an example.
588	From All of Us to All of You #7	December 23, 1979	Animated Episode; Reedited version of From All of US to All of You, Archival footage only Features a "surprise gift": The Donald Duck cartoon Corn Chips (1951)
589	That Darn Cat!	January 13, 1980	A comedy thriller film from 1968. A special 2-hour presentation.
590	Donald's Valentine's Day Salute	February 10, 1980	Animated episode Archival footage only
591	Escape to Witch Mountain	February 17, 1980	Sci-fi feature film from 1975. A special 2-hour presentation.
592	The Kids Who Knew Too Much	March 9, 1980	Mystery Drama TV film. A special 2-hour presentation.
593	Son of Flubber	March 16, 1980	Sci-fi feature film from 1963. A special 2-hour presentation One of the first national programs to be closed-captioned for the hearing-impaired.
594	Disney's Oscar Winners	April 13, 1980	Animated episode Archival footage only
595	Sultan and the Rock Star	April 20, 1980	Nature survival TV film Also known as The Hunter and the Rock Star. It emphasizes the animal-human bond and environmental ethics
596	The Secret of Lost Valley	April 27, 1980	Neo-Western TV film, in Two parts.
597	The Secret of Lost Valley	May 5, 1980	Neo-Western TV film, in Two parts.

=== Season 27 (1980–1981) ===
Episode #	Title	Original airdate	Notes
598	Disneyland 25th Anniversary Show	September 14, 1980	Theme Park Episode; Originally aired outside of the anthology series. Danny Kaye hosts. The Osmonds appear and play, Crazy Horses. Michael Jackson sings When You Wish Upon a Star.
599	Old Yeller	November 9, 1980	Western feature film from 1957 A serialized version in two parts.
600	Old Yeller	November 16, 1980	Western feature film from 1957 A serialized version in two parts.
601	The Mouseketeer Reunion	November 23, 1980	Companion Episode to The Mickey Mouse Club; The Animation is archival footage only The episode is primarily a live-action reunion of the original cast of the Mickey Mouse Club.
602	The Ghosts of Buxley Hall	December 21, 1980	Comedy Fantasy TV film, in two parts.
603	The Ghosts of Buxley Hall	December 28, 1980	Comedy Fantasy TV film, in two parts.
604	Lefty	April 19, 1981	Nature survival TV film. Focusing on disabilities. Originally aired outside of the anthology series as a documentary film.
605	Disney Animation: The Illusion of Life	April 26, 1981	Animation Behind the Scenes Episode. Archival footage only A companion to the book of the same title and documentary.
606	Follow Me, Boys!	August 2, 1981	Comedy Drama feature film from 1966 A serialized version in two parts.
607	Follow Me, Boys!	August 16, 1981	Comedy Drama feature film from 1966 A serialized version in two parts.

== Walt Disney episodes ==
Note: All of the following episodes were first aired on CBS.

=== Season 28 (1981–1982) ===
Episode #	Title	Original airdate	Notes
608	The Love Bug	September 26, 1981	Comedy Fantasy film from 1968 A serialized version in two parts. First episode to air on CBS
609	The Love Bug	October 3, 1981	Comedy Fantasy film from 1968 A serialized version in two parts. First episode to air on CBS
610	Herbie Rides Again	October 10, 1981	Comedy Fantasy film from 1974 A serialized version in two parts.
611	Herbie Rides Again	October 17, 1981	Comedy Fantasy film from 1974 A serialized version in two parts.
612	A Disney Halloween	October 24, 1981	Animated episode Archival footage only
613	The Last Flight of Noah's Ark	October 31, 1981	Nature Survival film from 1976 A serialized version in two parts. Shipwrecked story.
614	The Last Flight of Noah's Ark	November 7, 1981	Nature Survival film from 1976 A serialized version in two parts. Shipwrecked story.
615	A Disney Storybook	November 14, 1981	Animated episode Archival footage only
616	A Disney Storybook	November 21, 1981	Animated episode Archival footage only
617	The Cherokee Trail	November 28, 1981	Western TV film This episode served as a pilot for a possible television series.
618	A Magical Disney Christmas	December 5, 1981	Animated episode Archival footage only
619	Walt Disney: One Man's Dream	December 12, 1981	Theme Park Episode; The included animated sequences are archival footage only
620	Man's Hunting Instinct	January 2, 1982	Animated episode Archival footage only As this episode is a re-edited version of The Hunting Instinct (1961) such as using all of the bridge sequences featuring Von Drake. While replacing some of the original theatrical cartoons from the program with new cartoons. Donald's Camera (Replaces Clown of the Jungle), Rugged Bear (Replaces The Plastics Inventor) and Father's Lion (Replaces Fox Hunt (1938))
621	Tales of the Apple Dumpling Gang	January 16, 1982	Western TV film This episode served as a pilot for a possible television series, which eventually became Gun Shy.
622	Donald and José, Olé!	January 23, 1982	Animated episode Archival footage only. Extended version of Two Happy Amigos (TV 1960) with additional shorts.
623	The Cat from Outer Space	January 30, 1982	Sci-fi feature film from 1978. A serialized version in two parts.
624	The Cat from Outer Space	February 6, 1982	Sci-fi feature film from 1978. A serialized version in two parts.
625	A Disney Valentine	February 13, 1982	Animated episode Archival footage only
626	Beyond Witch Mountain	February 20, 1982	Sci-fi Episode; A pilot for a possible Sci-fi television series, which was never produced.
627	A Spaceman in King Arthur's Court	February 27, 1982	Sci-fi feature film Unidentified Flying Oddball from 1979. A serialized version in two parts.
628	A Spaceman in King Arthur's Court	March 6, 1982	Sci-fi feature film Unidentified Flying Oddball from 1979. A serialized version in two parts.
629	The Adventures of Pollyanna	April 10, 1982	Comedy Drama TV film. This Episode served as a pilot for a possible television series, which was never produced.
630	A Disney Vacation	May 1, 1982	Animated episode Archival footage only
631	Pluto and His Friends	July 31, 1982	Animated episode Archival footage only A 30-minute presentation.

=== Season 29 (1982–1983) ===
Episode #	Title	Original airdate	Notes
632	The Apple Dumpling Gang Rides Again	September 25, 1982	Western feature film from 1979, A serialized version in two parts
633	The Apple Dumpling Gang Rides Again	October 2, 1982	Western feature film from 1979, A serialized version in two parts
634	Freaky Friday	October 9, 1982	Comedy Fantasy feature film from 1976 A serialized version in two parts.
635	Freaky Friday	October 16, 1982	Comedy Fantasy feature film from 1976 A serialized version in two parts.
636	EPCOT Center: The Opening Celebration	October 23, 1982	Theme Park based episode. Originally meant to air as a stand-alone special.
637	Disney's Halloween Treat	October 30, 1982	Animated and Live-action Episode. Hosted by Hal Douglas (dressed up as Jack-o'-lantern); Animation Archival footage only
638	No Deposit, No Return	November 6, 1982	Comedy Crime feature film from 1976 A serialized version in two parts.
639	No Deposit, No Return	November 13, 1982	Comedy Crime feature film from 1976 A serialized version in two parts.
640	Blackbeard's Ghost	November 20, 1982	Comedy Fantasy feature film from 1968 A serialized version in two parts.
641	Blackbeard's Ghost	November 27, 1982	Comedy Fantasy feature film from 1968 A serialized version in two parts.
642	A Disney Christmas Gift	December 4, 1982	Animated episode Archival footage only
643	Winnie the Pooh and Friends	December 11, 1982	Animated episode Archival footage only
644	Walt Disney's Mickey and Donald	January 1, 1983	Animated episode Archival footage only A 30-minute presentation. Later re-edited as an hour.
645	The World's Greatest Athlete	January 4, 1983	Comedy Sport feature film from 1973 A serialized version in two parts. Beginning with this episode, the show moves to Tuesday nights.
646	The World's Greatest Athlete	January 11, 1983	Comedy Sport feature film from 1973 A serialized version in two parts. Beginning with this episode, the show moves to Tuesday nights.
647	Ferdinand the Bull and Mickey	January 18, 1983	Animated episode Archival footage only
648	A Valentine from Disney	February 8, 1983	Animated episode Archival footage only
649	Mickey and Donald Kidding Around	May 3, 1983	Animated episode A re-edited version of Kids is Kids from 1961. Archival footage only such as using most of the bridge sequences featuring Von Drake. While adding Donald's Off Day (1944) (Replacing Lucky Number (1951) and adding Pluto's Party (1952))
650	Walt Disney's Mickey and Donald	September 24, 1983	Animated episode Archival footage only A 60-minute presentation. Final episode of the original run of the Anthology series which started in 1954.
