= Beezy Bear =

1955 Donald Duck cartoon

- Theatrical release poster
- Directed by: Jack Hannah
- Story by: David Detiege; Al Bertino
- Produced by: Walt Disney
- Starring: Clarence Nash; James MacDonald; Bill Thompson
- Music by: Oliver Wallace
- Animation by: Bob Carlson; Al Coe; Volus Jones; Bill Justice; Dan MacManus (effects)
- Layouts by: Yale Gracey
- Backgrounds by: Brice Mack
- Color process: Technicolor
- Production company: Walt Disney Productions
- Distributed by: RKO Radio Pictures
- Release date: September 2, 1955; (USA)
- Running time: 7 minutes
- Country: United States
- Language: English

Beezy Bear is a 1955 Disney animated short featuring Donald Duck, who appears as a beekeeper. This is Humphrey the Bear's fifth appearance. The cartoon portrays Humphrey as a honey-stealing bear.

== Plot ==
While beekeeper, Donald, is working one morning, he greets another beekeeper, who is actually Humphrey the Bear in disguise. After noticing something suspicious about this so-called "beekeeper", he finds out it's Humphrey raiding his hives in an attempt to steal some of the honey. The bees then chase Humphrey, forcing him to hide underwater in a nearby pond.

Donald complains about this to Ranger Woodlore, who assembles his bears and informs them of Donald's predicament. Told that one of his bears is stealing Mr. Duck's honey, the entire group expresses mock outrage. Humphrey, who is the last bear to arrive, is still dripping from being in the pond. When Woodlore asks him why he is always wet, Humphrey responds by making body-washing gestures, to which Woodlore tells him that he bathes too much. Woodlore lines up his bears so that Donald could point out the guilty one. However, despite seeing Humphrey as more reddish and clearly seeing him sweating, Donald could not find the suspect telling Woodlore that they all look alike. Woodlore decides to make new rules.

The Ranger then shows the bears the property boundary line between their park and Donald's honey farm. He informs his bears (including Humphrey) to stay on their side of the property line, and he also tells Donald to keep his bees on his side of the line. Donald puts up a barbed wire fence to keep the bears out, but this does not stop Humphrey. After getting overwhelmed by Donald tasting the honey and raving about how good it tastes, Humphrey uses a sign to prop up the fence. After failing twice to outsmart the bees by using flowers to attract the bees and then trap them in a barrel, only for the barrel to burst open when Humphrey pulled a cork out, the bees fly at him in different directions until Humphrey jumped into the pond. Ranger Woodlore catches Humphrey in the pond, to which Humphrey pulls off the bathing lie again. Humphrey then tries to make silly faces annoying the bees, and Humphrey used a trash bin to trap them and then stomp on them. Unfortunately, the bees are too quick that they escape and end up flying into Humphrey's mouth as he's attempting to steal a hive, and he quickly spits them back out and runs away from the swarm again breaking through the fence. Ranger Woodlore shoos the bees back to their side and then sees some of Humphrey's hair left on the fence, to which he decides to take it using it as a toupee. Humphrey then uses a hose to try to obtain the honey, but Donald takes the hose sucking it back in. They fight back and forth with it for a bit until Donald fills the hose with water to try to trick Humphrey, but Ranger Woodlore interferes taking the hose away from Humphrey returning it to Donald since it is his hose. The trio fights over who gets the hose until the water squirts into everyone's faces catapulting them into the pond. After which, Woodlore hits Humphrey on the head and says, "You take too many baths!" which Donald agreed, "Yeah!" and hit Humphrey on the head too.

== Voice cast ==
- Donald Duck: Clarence Nash
- Humphrey the Bear: Jimmy MacDonald
- J. Audubon Woodlore: Bill Thompson

== Home media ==
The short was released on November 11, 2008, on Walt Disney Treasures: The Chronological Donald, Volume Four: 1951-1961.

It is also available on Disney+.

== See also ==
- In the Bag
- Rugged Bear
- Grin and Bear It
- Bearly Asleep
- Hooked Bear
