= Humphrey the Bear =

Disney cartoon character

- Donald Duck character
- Humphrey the Bear sporting his signature grin; from the intro to Hooked Bear (1956).
- First appearance: Hold That Pose (1950)
- Created by: Walt Disney; Jack Hannah
- Voiced by: James MacDonald (1950–1956, 1989); Frank Welker (1992); Jim Cummings (1999–present)

In-universe information
- Species: Brown bear
- Gender: Male

Humphrey the Bear is a cartoon character created in 1950 at Walt Disney Animation Studios. He first appeared in the 1950 Goofy cartoon Hold That Pose, in which Goofy tried to take his picture. After that he appeared in four classic Donald Duck cartoons: Rugged Bear (1953), Grin and Bear It (1954), Bearly Asleep (1955), and Beezy Bear (1955).

Disney gave him his own series in 1955, but only two films resulted (Hooked Bear and In the Bag, both 1956) before Disney discontinued making theatrical short subjects. When the shorts division closed, Humphrey was the last of only seven Disney characters who had been given a series of their own, starring in cartoons who opened with their own logo (the six others were Mickey Mouse, Donald Duck, Goofy, Pluto, Chip 'n' Dale, and Figaro).

The Humphrey cartoons feature a broader, wilder style of comedy than the usually cute or coy Disney gags; critic Leonard Maltin described them as "belly-laugh comedies that can hold their own against the best of MGM and Warner Brothers".

== Development ==
The bear that would become Humphrey first appeared in the 1950 Goofy cartoon Hold That Pose! Three years later, Donald Duck series animator Jack Hannah revived the ursine character:

"For the sake of something new, we tried the Duck with a bear in Rugged Bear and it seemed like an immediate success for them to play against each other. At the time we had not named the bear. Later, when we started thinking of another picture for the bear, it seemed natural to be in a National Forest... We again used the bear and now he got his name of Humphrey".

== Personality ==
Humphrey is a big, opportunistic, neurotic and dimwitted brown bear who lives in Brownstone National Park. He is constantly trying different ways to steal food and/or shelter from unsuspecting visitors, often violating the park rules in the process. However, his habit of fulfilling his wants/needs in this manner is not entirely unjustified, as it is often shown that he is seldom rewarded when he follows the rules. Unlike most Disney characters, Humphrey does not speak, but instead makes an assortment of inarticulate sounds to convey his emotions; those grunts were supplied by Director Jack Hannah while the sound effects "roars" were provided by Disney staffer Jimmy MacDonald. When stricken by worry or panic, Humphrey runs desperately in place, with his feet seemingly headed in all directions. Humphrey's foil is most often Donald Duck, one of his antagonists; otherwise it is typically an officious park ranger voiced by Bill Thompson. The ranger's name was never identified in the theatrical shorts, but when the films were re-edited into an hour-long Disney TV episode, he was referred to as J. Audubon Woodlore.

== Popularity ==
The films were popular in theaters, and the character was familiar enough to be included in the Mickey Mouse Club opening (Humphrey is one of the characters who holds the trampoline that bounces Mickey Mouse in the air).

== Later appearances ==
Although the series Humphrey starred in enjoyed only a short run, a later generation of Disney artists and directors remembered Humphrey fondly, and cast him in episodes of Chip 'n Dale Rescue Rangers, Goof Troop, Mickey Mouse Works, House of Mouse, and Mickey Mouse Clubhouse. Humphrey returned to the screen in three new shorts: Donald's Grizzly Guest and Donald's Fish Fry reunite Humphrey with Donald Duck, and in Hot Tub Humphrey Humphrey is once again in the title role, alongside Ranger Woodlore. In these appearances, his vocals alternated between Frank Welker and Jim Cummings. Due to adding Humphrey to these Disney programs he became a more current character and can be seen in more Disney-related merchandise such as watches, cards, pins, T-shirts, and posters. In 2018, he returned in the series Legend of the Three Caballeros, where he is re-imagined as a bear rug reanimated by a magical artifact called the Spark of Life. He later made a cameo in Ralph Breaks the Internet, where he is seen doing a dance and picking up trash on the floor in the background when Vanellope visits OhMyDisney.com. He has a cameo appearance in the 2023 short film Once Upon a Studio, where he rode in an elevator to take a group photo with several other Disney characters.

== Filmography ==
=== Short films ===
- Hold That Pose (1950) – Goofy short film
- Rugged Bear (1953) – Donald Duck short film
- Working for Peanuts (1953) – Donald Duck short film (cameo)
- Grin and Bear It (1954) – Donald Duck short film
- Bearly Asleep (1955) – Donald Duck short film
- Beezy Bear (1955) – Donald Duck short film
- Hooked Bear (1956) – Humphrey the Bear short film
- In the Bag (1956) – Humphrey the Bear short film
- Once Upon a Studio (2023) – independent short film (cameo)

=== Television ===
- Chip 'n Dale Rescue Rangers (1989)
  - "Bearing Up Baby", May 14, 1989
- Goof Troop (1992)
  - "You Camp Take It with You", September 9, 1992
- Mickey Mouse Works (1999)
  - "Donald's Grizzly Guest", November 7, 1999
  - "Donald's Fish Fry", September 23, 2000
  - "Survival of the Woodchucks", February 19, 2000
- House of Mouse (2001)
  - "Humphrey in the House", September 2, 2002
- Mickey Mouse Clubhouse (2006)
  - "Clarabelle's Clubhouse Carnival", May 10, 2008
- Mickey Mouse (2013)
  - "The Birthday Song", November 18, 2017
  - "Springtime!", May 12, 2018
- Legend of the Three Caballeros (2018)
- The Wonderful World of Mickey Mouse
  - "Cheese Wranglers", November 18, 2020 (cameo)

=== Feature films ===
- The Ranger of Brownstone (1968)
- Ralph Breaks the Internet (2018) (cameo)
- The Wonderful Autumn of Mickey Mouse (2022) (cameo)

== Comic book appearances ==
Humphrey appeared in two American comic stories drawn by Paul Murry in 1959 and in another one drawn by Tony Strobl in 1966. Strobl also drew comic stories with Humphrey for the market outside of the US, most of them also featuring Grandma Duck. Ed Nofziger wrote scripts for many foreign market stories with Humphrey. Most of those ones were drawn by cartoonists of the Argentinian art studio Jaime Diaz Studio.

== Popular culture ==
Jack Hannah, who directed the 1950s Humphrey shorts, revived the "dumb bear" idea for Walter Lantz's "Fatso the Bear" cartoons in 1960 and 1961. It would also seem probable that the Hanna-Barbera animation studio was somewhat inspired by Humphrey in its creation of the somewhat smarter Yogi Bear (from 1958), who lives at Jellystone Park, begs, steals, and plays tricks to steal picnic baskets from campers, and is constantly on the lookout for Ranger Smith.

Humphrey is currently the spokescharacter for Disney's Wilderness Lodge Resort at Walt Disney World in Florida. He is featured on the totem pole in the lobby along with Mickey, Donald Duck, and Goofy. His merchandise was at one point featured in the Briar Patch store in the Magic Kingdom.

In February 2026, Humphrey the Bear debuted as a walkaround character interacting with guests at Disneyland, as part of the 25th anniversary Disney California Adventure festivities, and for a limited time frequented Donald’s Tales of Adventure Dinner Buffet at the Storytellers Cafe in Disney’s Grand Californian Hotel.
