= Rugged Bear =

1953 Donald Duck cartoon

- Theatrical release poster
- Directed by: Jack Hannah
- Story by: Al Bertino; David Detiege
- Produced by: Walt Disney
- Starring: Jimmy MacDonald; Clarence Nash; Jack Hannah; Jack Mather
- Narrated by: Art Gilmore
- Music by: Oliver Wallace
- Animation by: Bob Carlson; Volus Jones; George Kreisl; Dan MacManus (effects)
- Layouts by: Yale Gracey
- Backgrounds by: Ray Huffine
- Color process: Technicolor
- Production company: Walt Disney Productions
- Distributed by: RKO Radio Pictures
- Release date: October 23, 1953; (USA)
- Running time: 6 minutes
- Country: United States
- Language: English

Rugged Bear is a 1953 American animated short film produced by Walt Disney Productions and released by RKO Radio Pictures. The cartoon follows Humphrey the Bear (in his 2nd appearance) as he takes refuge in Donald Duck's cabin during hunting season by disguising himself as a bearskin rug. The film was directed by Jack Hannah and features the voices of Clarence Nash as Donald, Jimmy MacDonald as Humphrey, and an uncredited narrator.

Rugged Bear was nominated for the Academy Award for Best Animated Short Film at the 26th Academy Awards in 1954, but lost to another Disney film, Toot, Whistle, Plunk and Boom. This was the eighth of nine nominations received by the Donald Duck film series.

== Plot ==
Humphrey the Bear oversleeps through the opening of hunting season one year. While the other bears flee to the safety of their cave, Humphrey is left outside and is forced to hide in a nearby cabin instead. Once inside the cabin, Humphrey is horrified to learn that it is a hunting lodge, made evident by the many guns and hunting trophies hanging on the walls. As he starts to leave, he sees Donald Duck coming toward the cabin carrying a rifle. Humphrey desperately looks for a hiding place inside the cabin, and finally notices a large bear skin rug in front of the fireplace. He quickly rolls up the rug, stows it in an empty trunk, and lays out flat on the floor in the rug's place. Just then, Donald enters unaware that his rug has been replaced, or that it is alive. Humphrey nervously endures several uncomfortable and painful experiences, all the while being very careful not to let Donald know that he is a real bear. These include hiccups, a burning ember from the fireplace falling on his fur, going through Donald's washer-dryer, and being mowed with a reel mower, among other things.

Off screen Humphrey spends the rest of hunting season in Donald's cabin carrying on his rug masquerade. When hunting season is over, Donald finally leaves and Humphrey breaths a sigh of relief. Just then, he hears a sound from the trunk in the corner and learns, much to his surprise, that the bearskin rug which he had rolled up and stowed earlier is actually another bear who had also masqueraded as a rug. The film ends with the other bear leaving and thanking Humphrey for taking his place.

== Voice cast ==
- Humphrey the Bear: James MacDonald
- Donald Duck: Clarence Nash

== Releases ==
- 1953 - theatrical release
- 1959 - Walt Disney Presents, episode #5.18: "Duck Flies Coop" (TV)
- 1961 - Walt Disney's Wonderful World of Color, episode #8.5: "The Hunting Instinct" (TV)
- 1968 - Walt Disney's Wonderful World of Color, episode #14.22: "The Ranger of Brownstone" (TV)
- c. 1983 - Good Morning, Mickey!, episode #17 (TV)
- c. 1992 - Mickey's Mouse Tracks, episode #15 (TV)
- 1997 - The Ink and Paint Club, episode #1.30: "'50s Donald" (TV)

== Home media ==
The short was released on November 11, 2008, on Walt Disney Treasures: The Chronological Donald, Volume Four: 1951-1961.

Additional releases include:

- 1984 - Cartoon Classics: Donald Duck's First 50 Years (VHS)

== See also ==
- Hooked Bear
- In the Bag
- Bearly Asleep
- Grin and Bear It
- Beezy Bear
