= In the Bag (film) =

1956 film by Jack Hannah

- Directed by: Jack Hannah
- Written by: Dave Detiege; Al Bertino
- Produced by: Walt Disney
- Starring: Bill Thompson; Jimmy MacDonald
- Music by: George Bruns
- Animation by: George Kreisl; John Sibley; Al Coe; Bob Carlson
- Layouts by: Yale Gracey
- Backgrounds by: Ray Huffine
- Production company: Walt Disney Productions
- Distributed by: RKO Radio Pictures
- Release date: July 27, 1956
- Running time: 7 min
- Country: United States
- Language: English

In the Bag is a 1956 American animated short comedy film produced by Walt Disney Productions, directed by Jack Hannah, and featuring park ranger J. Audubon Woodlore and his comedic foil Humphrey the Bear.

This was the last Disney theatrical cartoon short subject distributed by RKO Radio Pictures.

== Plot ==
Tourists have departed Brownstone National Park where Humphrey lives, leaving trash everywhere, despite signs asking tourists not to litter the park. The park ranger initially starts to pick it up himself, but then decides that he should not have to do it because he is the boss. He then calls Humphrey and the other resident bears and asks them to "put it in the bag", while singing and dancing to a catchy song. The bears happily collect the trash, bouncing and jouncing until the ranger tries to take a nap, which makes them realize the ranger's actual motivation. With Humphrey dropping the ranger into a garbage can, the bears angrily dump their bags of refuse on the ground. Realizing that he should at least reward the bears for their assistance, the ranger prepares some chicken cacciatore, but says that he will only give it to the bears on the condition that they clean up their sections of the park. All of the bears then move their garbage into one section, leaving Humphrey to clean it all up himself. He does this quickly by stuffing the garbage into a bag, but as he is returning to receive his dinner, the bag gets caught on the twig of a tree stump and rips apart, letting the garbage out. The ranger then gives him a new bag and Humphrey follows the garbage down the line all the way to a cliff, but falls off as he puts the last scrap in the bag. Next, he attempts to conceal the garbage under a bush, but the bush turns out to be the home of a rabbit, who disgustedly pushes it back out. Humphrey then tries to burn the garbage with a match, but is stopped by Smokey Bear, who reminds him that only Humphrey can prevent forest fires. Finally, Humphrey puts all of the trash into a hollow stump, which is actually a geyser named "Ol' Fateful". The ranger prepares to reward Humphrey with a dish full of cacciatore, but before Humphrey can take it, the geyser suddenly erupts, spouting the garbage everywhere, resulting in Humphrey having to start all over again at cleaning up the park.

== In the Bag song ==
The song featured in In The Bag was so popular that Disney released a version of it (with similar instrumentation and different vocals) as a single, "The Humphrey Hop".

The song was sung again by Woodlore to his Brownstone Bears in a 2002 episode of Disney's House of Mouse, where they serve as the House's "clean-up crew".

The song later appeared in Cars 3 with different lyrics performed by Mater (Larry the Cable Guy).

== Voice cast ==
- Humphrey the Bear: Jimmy MacDonald
- J. Audubon Woodlore: Bill Thompson
- Smokey Bear: Jackson Weaver

== Home media ==
The short was released on December 6, 2005 on Walt Disney Treasures: Disney Rarities - Celebrated Shorts: 1920s–1960s.

== See also ==
- Grin and Bear It
- Hooked Bear
- Bearly Asleep
- Rugged Bear
- Smokey Bear
