= Grin and Bear It (film) =

1954 Donald Duck cartoon

- Theatrical release poster
- Directed by: Jack Hannah
- Written by: David Detiege; Al Bertino
- Produced by: Walt Disney
- Starring: Clarence Nash; James MacDonald; Bill Thompson
- Music by: Oliver Wallace
- Production company: Walt Disney Productions
- Distributed by: RKO Radio Pictures
- Release date: August 13, 1954
- Running time: 7 minutes
- Country: United States
- Language: English

Grin and Bear It is a 1954 Disney animated short featuring Donald Duck, It is the third appearance of Humphrey the Bear, and marks the debut of Ranger J. Audubon Woodlore.

== Plot ==
Donald Duck goes to Brownstone National Park for a picnic. Upon arrival, Ranger J. Audubon Woodlore informs Donald and the other guests of the long list of rules, most importantly "Don't Molest the Bears." Woodlore then calls in the bears and gives them their assignments for the day, reminding them that the previous year some unnamed bear was accused of stealing—to which the other bears glare at Humphrey—and that any further theft would result in the perpetrator being executed and skinned for a rug.

The bears pair off with park guests, leaving Donald as the last guest for Humphrey to entertain. Donald has a large ham that Humphrey wants to eat, but Donald ignores Humphrey's dance routines, and when Humphrey helps Donald assemble a large sandwich, Donald eats the whole thing, all the while the other guests are giving copious snacks to the bears. The only morsel Humphrey can manage to taste is an exceptionally hot pepper, which burns his mouth. Donald then leaves the park, so Humphrey stages a hit-and-run by throwing a large rock in Donald's path, then painting a tire track on his chest and lying behind the car. Fearing retribution for injuring a bear, Donald gives Humphrey his leftovers, only to renege when Humphrey brushes off the track. The ensuing fight (and mess) is interrupted when Woodlore orders both to clean up the food and takes the ham for himself. Humphrey and Donald gesture to shame Woodlore for the attempted theft, to which an embarrassed Woodlore responds with Humphrey's trademark "yeah."

== Voice cast ==
- Donald Duck: Clarence Nash
- Humphrey the Bear: Jimmy MacDonald
- J. Audubon Woodlore: Bill Thompson

== Production ==
When the ranger shows the bears "the supreme penalty", the notes of the Dragnet theme was played.

== Home media ==
The short was released on November 11, 2008, on Walt Disney Treasures: The Chronological Donald, Volume Four: 1951-1961.

== See also ==
- Rugged Bear
- Bearly Asleep
- Hooked Bear
- In the Bag
