= Hooked Bear =

1956 film by Jack Hannah

- Directed by: Jack Hannah
- Written by: David Detiege; Al Bertino
- Produced by: Walt Disney
- Starring: Bill Thompson; Jimmy MacDonald
- Music by: Oliver Wallace
- Animation by: Bill Justice; John Sibley; Al Coe; Bob Carlson
- Layouts by: Yale Gracey
- Backgrounds by: Ray Huffine
- Production company: Walt Disney Productions
- Distributed by: RKO Radio Pictures
- Release date: April 27, 1956
- Running time: 5:55
- Country: United States
- Language: English

Hooked Bear is a 1956 short film in the Humphrey the Bear series.

== Plot ==
Fishing season has begun and park ranger J. Audubon Woodlore goes out on the lake to check on the anglers. Humphrey the Bear is trying to catch some fish, but cannot seem to hold onto one once he catches it. Woodlore sees the fish disappearing before his eyes, so he decides to stock the lake with some more. As he heads to the fish hatchery, he sees Humphrey with a few fishing nets and rods, and asks him what he is doing. When the bear tells him that he is going to catch some fish, Woodlore takes the rods and nets and tells him to "Go fish like a bear!" At the hatchery, Woodlore selects an envelope of fish eggs from a collection of eggs. He fills a tub with water and inserts the eggs into it. In a matter of seconds, several fishes pop up out of the water like plants out of soil.

When the ranger gets to the lake to dump the fish, he finds Humphrey in there, trying to eat one of the small fishes, which is then consumed by a much larger fish. Humphrey manages to remove the small fish from the mouth of the large fish, and then uses it to lure five other large fishes that jump out of the water, but then Woodlore appears to measure the fish. As he measures the small fish, he states that it's too small. So Humphrey stretches the small fish, to make it look bigger. An annoyed Woodlore hits Humphrey on the head with an oar, causing him to sink into the depths of the lake. When Humphrey grabs some more fish and emerges from the lake, he discovers a fish larger than any of the others; this turns out to be a fish balloon with which a young boy is playing. Humphrey pops the balloon, and both the boy and Woodlore kick the bear in the knee which the latter told Humphrey to leave the kid alone when Humphrey told Woodlore what happen.

Humphrey then tries to think of another way to foil the anglers; noticing the boy from before walking along the lake with a toy boat, he removes the bottom from the boat, ties it onto his head like a hat, and then submerges himself into the lake so that the hat looks like a shark's dorsal fin to the anglers, causing them to flee in terror. Humphrey then takes all of the anglers' bags of fish, but upon seeing the ranger, he loads the fish into Woodlore's helicopter, giving him more of a full load than he was expecting. He then decides to stuff himself into the plane, which proves to be too small for him and the fish, and then all of the fish in the helicopter, along with Humphrey, are deposited into the lake.

Woodlore then gets a telephone call from the chief of the United States Fish and Wildlife Service, who tells him to stop stocking the lake, as fishing season ended yesterday. The ranger then takes out his scissors and cuts the rods of various anglers, and then locates Humphrey and informs him that fishing season is over. He then paints a red X over the "Fishing Season" sign and flips it over to reveal the message "Hunting Season Now Open". Humphrey tries to run away, as shots are fired at him from all directions.

== Voice cast ==
- Humphrey the Bear: Jimmy MacDonald
- J. Audubon Woodlore: Bill Thompson

== Home media ==
The short was released on December 6, 2005 on Walt Disney Treasures: Disney Rarities - Celebrated Shorts: 1920s–1960s.

== See also ==
- In the Bag
- Grin and Bear It
- Rugged Bear
- Bearly Asleep
