= Al Bertino =

American animator

Al Bertino (July 15, 1912 – August 18, 1996) was an American animator best remembered for his work with the Walt Disney Company.

Born in California in 1912, Bertino began work for Walt Disney in 1935. Apart from his work on feature films, such as Pinocchio and Fantasia, Bertino also wrote for Disney Anthology Television Series, and helped create a number of attractions at Disneyland, including Mr. Toad's Wild Ride, Haunted Mansion, Country Bear Jamboree, and America Sings. Until his retirement in 1977, he worked as an assistant animator and storyman for Mintz Animation, Harmon-Ising Animation, Disney, UPA, Snowball Animation, Grantray-Lawrence Animation and Walter Lantz Animation. In 1986, he won a Golden Award (given to Motion Picture Screen Cartoonists). Bertino died on August 18, 1996, in Los Angeles.

== Notes ==
- The giant bear at the Country Bear Jamboree called 'Big Al' was a self-portrait.
- In a 1945 Disney short, "Hockey Homicide', all the characters are named for members of the Disney staff including "Ice Box Bertino", who, as a running gag, repeatedly gets into hockey fights with "Fearless Ferguson" (named for Norm Ferguson)
- Bertino was portrayed by actor Thomas Bellin in episode 11 of the 1969 season of Dragnet, "Narcotics – DR-16". Bertino is depicted designing posters for the student-led anti-drug group Smarteens.
- Al Bertino is the creator of "The Monster Plantation" (now Monster Mansion) dark ride at Six Flags Over Georgia.
