= Bearly Asleep =

1955 Donald Duck cartoon

- Theatrical release poster
- Directed by: Jack Hannah
- Story by: David Detiege
- Produced by: Walt Disney
- Starring: Clarence Nash; James MacDonald
- Music by: Oliver Wallace
- Animation by: Bob Carlson; Al Coe; Volus Jones; Dan MacManus (effects)
- Layouts by: Yale Gracey
- Backgrounds by: Ray Huffine
- Color process: Technicolor
- Production company: Walt Disney Productions
- Distributed by: RKO Radio Pictures
- Release date: August 19, 1955 (U.S.)
- Running time: 7 minutes
- Country: United States
- Language: English

Bearly Asleep is a 1955 CinemaScope Disney animated short featuring Donald Duck, who appears as a park ranger, with Humphrey the Bear.

== Plot ==
After the park guests leave for the winter, forest ranger Donald leads the bears into a cave to hibernate. Humphrey is happily snoozing in a hammock, until Donald kicks him out and marches him into the cave. As the other bears settle down to sleep, Humphrey raises his hand and asks for a glass of water. As Donald turns to leave, Humphrey yells that one of the bears pinched him. Angry, Donald throws the glass at the cave wall, and yells at Humphrey to be quiet. Donald returns to his house, grumbling about the bears. In the cave, Humphrey starts snoring, and the other bears kick him out.

Humphrey tries unsuccessfully to take refuge in a hollow log, but is kicked out by a grumpy rabbit. Then he tries to sleep in a train tunnel, but a train drives through. Finally, he decides to sleep in Donald's house. He pretends to sleepwalk his way into Donald's bed. Wise to his actions, Donald holds an oil lamp under Humphrey's mattress until the bear runs out of the house. Donald tells Humphrey to stay out, but Humphrey inadvertently gets back inside when his nose gets stuck on a window. He then tries hiding in the shower, but retreats after being exposed to hot water. He hides in the kitchen oven, but again gets caught by Donald, who kicks him out for the last time. After having some toys thrown at him, Humphrey disguises himself as a baby to return to the cave, which is a success. The other bears take Humphrey back inside, but to their disadvantage, as they cannot sleep because of Humphrey's snoring.

== Voice cast ==
- Donald Duck: Clarence Nash
- Humphrey the Bear: Jimmy MacDonald

== Home media ==
The short was released on November 11, 2008, on Walt Disney Treasures: The Chronological Donald, Volume Four: 1951-1961.

It is also available on Disney+.
