= Witch Mountain =

Witch Mountain may refer to:

- Witch Mountain (band), a doom metal band from Portland, Oregon
- Escape to Witch Mountain (1968), a science fiction novel by Alexander Key
- Witch Mountain (franchise), a Disney film franchise based on Key's novel:
  - Escape to Witch Mountain (1975 film), a film based on the novel
  - Return from Witch Mountain (1978), a sequel to the 1975 film
  - Beyond Witch Mountain (1982), a sequel to the 1978 film
  - Escape to Witch Mountain (1995 film), a television film based on the novel
  - Race to Witch Mountain (2009), a remake of the 1975 film using elements from the novel
