= Escape to Witch Mountain (1995 film) =

1995 American television film by Peter Rader

- Television listing advertisement
- Genre: Adventure; Family; Fantasy
- Based on: Escape to Witch Mountain by Robert Malcolm Young; Escape to Witch Mountain by Alexander Key
- Teleplay by: Peter Rader
- Directed by: Peter Rader
- Starring: Elisabeth Moss; Erik von Detten; Perrey Reeves; Robert Vaughn; Vincent Schiavelli; Brad Dourif
- Music by: Richard Marvin
- Country of origin: United States
- Original language: English

Production
- Executive producers: George Zaloom; Les Mayfield; Scott Immergut
- Producer: Joan Van Horn
- Cinematography: Russ T. Alsobrook
- Editor: Duane Hartzell
- Running time: 87 minutes
- Production companies: Walt Disney Television; Zaloom/Mayfield Productions

Original release
- Network: ABC
- Release: April 29, 1995

Related
- The Computer Wore Tennis Shoes; Freaky Friday

Escape to Witch Mountain is a 1995 American fantasy-adventure television film written and directed by Peter Rader. It is a remake of the 1975 film of the same name. The film was announced by American Broadcasting Company (ABC) in September 1994, as the third of four Disney film remakes to air on the channel, the other three being The Shaggy Dog, The Computer Wore Tennis Shoes, and Freaky Friday. The film was produced by Walt Disney Television and premiered on ABC on April 29, 1995, as an ABC Family Movie.

== Plot ==
On the outskirts of a small town stands a rock formation called Witch Mountain, rumored to possess mysterious powers. A young waitress, Zoe Moon, witnesses infant twin children Anna and Danny appear behind the diner where she works in a pillar of purple light, causing her to faint from shock. When a local hermit named Bruno finds them in the bed of his truck, he moves Anna to the back of another nearby truck but is seen by Sheriff Bronson while carrying Danny and is told to freeze. The truck containing Anna drives away before she is noticed, separating the two.

Danny spends the next nine years of his life between foster families and frequently runs away. After his latest attempt is thwarted, his frustrated social worker decides to leave him at an orphanage run by Lindsay Brown. He is reunited with Anna when she saves him from Xander, an older boy at the orphanage who has a soft spot for Anna. Neither Danny or Anna are initially aware of their relationship, despite performing identical odd mannerisms. However, their newly found proximity to one another reawakens their supernatural powers and they realize that they are siblings. When Edward Bolt, a local magnate seeking to develop the nearby Witch Mountain, notices their powers, he decides to take them in. Though Danny is happy with the adoption because he has his sister and a nice home, Anna is apprehensive and befriends Bolt's chauffeur, Luthor, who feels he has a connection to the twins.

During one of their outings to a purple general store, Anna uses her telekinetic abilities and catches the attention of the store's owner, Waldo Fudd. Waldo reveals he has the same abilities they do and that they are from another world where everyone has a twin. When they came to Earth to explore, everyone separated due to the quarrels they experienced, with most subsequently forgetting their bonds. Waldo has been working to reunite them all and take them home. Meanwhile, Zoe sees the purple light from the front of the shop, recognizes it, and confronts Waldo to discover the fate of the twins she saw years earlier. Though he dismisses her claims, he leaves her clues regarding Anna and Danny's fates if she wishes to help them.

Bolt reveals his true intention to exploit the twins' power to blast open Witch Mountain without explosives in order to obtain its valuable rock material, despite Waldo's protest that the mountain must be left alone. Anna learns the truth and telepathically warns Danny, only to be held hostage by Bolt so that Danny will do as he asks. The twins are rescued by a repentant Xander, and escape to Waldo's shop on a horse that Danny communicates with to help them. Lindsay becomes suspicious of Bolt when he sends the police to retrieve the children from the shop.

Zoe and Bruno help Danny and Anna escape to Witch Mountain after the twins levitate Bruno's truck, while Bolt is arrested by Bronson after Luthor exposes Bolt's plot. At Witch Mountain, Waldo and the other reunited twins await Anna and Danny so they can all return home. The last set of twins arrive soon after — Bruno and Luthor. Using Waldo and his twin's power on their home world, all of the twins return home in pairs, with Anna and Danny going last to close the gate between their home world and Earth. Waldo casually comments that he will be waiting for the next group of tourists, while Zoe vows to tell their story; she narrates that Witch Mountain is not haunted but has light in it.

== Cast ==
- Elisabeth Moss as Anna
- Erik von Detten as Danny
- Perrey Reeves as Zoe Moon
- Robert Vaughn as Edward Bolt
- Lynne Moody as Lindsay Brown
- Sam Horrigan as Xander
- Lauren Tom as Claudia Ford
- Vincent Schiavelli as Waldo Fudd
- Henry Gibson as Ravetch
- Bobby Motown as Skeeto
- Kevin Tighe as Sheriff Bronson
- Brad Dourif as Bruno/Luthor (dual role)
- John Petlock as Butler
- Beth Colt as Woman officer
- Daniel Lavery as Mr. Flynn
- Jeffrey Lampert as Man on TV
- Ray Lykins as Deputy
- Jennifer & Marissa Bullock as Baby Anna
- Nikki & Sammi Allen as Baby Danny

== See also ==
- Escape to Witch Mountain, the original 1975 theatrical film
- Return from Witch Mountain, the 1978 theatrical sequel
- Beyond Witch Mountain, the 1982 television sequel
- Race to Witch Mountain, the 2009 Disney remake of the 1975 film
- Alexander Key, the author of Escape to Witch Mountain, the 1968 science fiction novel
