= Beyond Witch Mountain =

1982 television film by Robert Day

- DVD cover
- Based on: Characters created by Alexander Key
- Teleplay by: Robert Malcolm Young; B.W. Sandefur; Hal Kanter
- Story by: Robert Malcolm Young
- Directed by: Robert Day
- Starring: Eddie Albert; Tracey Gold; Andy Freeman; Efrem Zimbalist Jr.
- Music by: George Duning
- Country of origin: United States
- Original language: English

Production
- Producer: Jan Williams
- Cinematography: Jack A. Whitman Jr.
- Editor: Gordon D. Brenner
- Running time: 48 minutes
- Production company: Walt Disney Productions

Original release
- Network: CBS
- Release: February 20, 1982

Related
- Escape to Witch Mountain (1975); Return from Witch Mountain (1978); Escape to Witch Mountain (1995); Race to Witch Mountain (2009)

Beyond Witch Mountain is a 1982 American science fantasy television film directed by Robert Day. It is a sequel to Escape to Witch Mountain (1975) and the third installment in the Witch Mountain franchise. While most parts were recast, including Tia and Tony, Eddie Albert returned to play Jason O'Day from the original 1975 film.

Beyond Witch Mountain aired on CBS as episode 19 of season 28 of Walt Disney on February 20, 1982.

While the siblings Tia and Tony are teenagers in the original sequel film Return from Witch Mountain (1978), the characters in Beyond Witch Mountain are younger, closer in age to their depiction in the first film, Escape to Witch Mountain (1975).

== Plot ==
Tia and Tony follow their Uncle Bené as he leaves the Witch Mountain colony. As they catch up to him in the woods, Deranian and Foreman, henchmen of billionaire Aristotle Bolt, shoot tranquilizer darts toward the trio in an attempt to capture the children. Bené reverses the darts in mid-air, and one strikes Foreman as Deranian runs from the scene.

Tia and Tony learn that Bené has left the colony in search of his long-lost grandson. In a vision, Bené discovered that his grandson, Gregory, also a survivor from their lost world, used his telekinetic powers to move a log across a river to save drowning children. Bené first encourages Tia and Tony to return to the safety of Witch Mountain, but they insist that they can help and Bené concedes. Tia, Tony and Bené set up camp in the woods for the night, and they begin to visualize a cabin, which they draw in the dirt with a stick. Bené finally reveals to the children that his time on Earth has come to an end. As he passes away and his body evaporates, he tells the children to go to the cabin to seek help in finding Gregory.

The next morning, Tia ascertains that the cabin belonged to Jason O’Day. They reunite with Jason, who reluctantly agrees to help them find and return Gregory to Witch Mountain, after Tony reveals that Bolt is again pursuing them. The children are also reunited with Winkie, Tia's black cat, who she entrusted to Jason at the end of Escape.

Meanwhile, Bolt, now aware that the children have left their secret colony, sends Deranian to bring Jason to him, in an attempt to lure the children to Bolt. When Jason and the children are briefly separated on a shopping trip, Jason is held up at gunpoint by Deranian and Foreman and forced to drive to Bolt's estate. Winkie leaps out of the window of Jason's camper, and telepathically informs Tia of Jason's plight.

Jason, meanwhile, is drugged by Bolt in an attempt to gain information about the children, and Jason inadvertently reveals that he has been in contact with the children. The children hitchhike their way to Bolt's estate to rescue Jason. Using their telekinetic powers, they cause a commotion inside the home, which allows them the opportunity to escape with Jason. The trio successfully escapes from Bolt in time to retrieve Gregory from a hospital, where he has been under observation. Tia and Tony teach Gregory about their people, and the colony of Witch Mountain, and Gregory happily agrees to be returned to his people, having already had visions of his impending rescue.

Jason brings Tia, Tony and Gregory to the woods near Witch Mountain. The children begin walking towards the colony, but Tony and Tia decide that they should seek out other survivors from their world, and bring them home to Witch Mountain. As Gregory continues on to Witch Mountain, Tia and Tony return to Jason's camper, and Jason agrees to help them in their efforts to retrieve other survivors.

== Cast ==
- Eddie Albert as Jason O'Day
- Tracey Gold as Tia
- Andy Freeman as Tony
- Efrem Zimbalist Jr. as Bolt
- J.D. Cannon as Deranian
- Noah Beery Jr. as Uncle Bené
- Stephanie Blackmore as Dr. Adrian Molina
- Peter Hobbs as Dr. Peter Morton
- Gene Dynarski as Lawrence
- William H. Bassett as Lowell Roberts
- James Luisi as Foreman
- Hettie Lynne Hurtes as reporter
- Lola Mason as lady driver
- Eric Aved as Gregory
- Kirk Cameron as boy

== See also ==
- Escape to Witch Mountain (1975)
