= Witch Mountain (franchise) =

American media franchise

- Official franchise logo, as released in 2009.
- Based on: Escape to Witch Mountain by Alexander Key
- Distributed by: The Walt Disney Company
- Country: United States
- Language: English
- Box office: >$106,387,141 (3 films) (Note: These figures are based on the available numbers for the theatrical films. Though there are a total five movies, there is no financial information publicly available for the made-for-television films.)

The Witch Mountain franchise consists of American science fiction fantasy-action adventure films, produced by The Walt Disney Company. Based on the 1968 novel Escape to Witch Mountain by Alexander Key, the films deal with extraterrestrial children on Earth seeking to return to their home planet, while antagonists attempt to foil their escape. The franchise includes both theatrical and made-for-television releases.

A reboot television series starring Bryce Dallas Howard was in development, to be released exclusively streaming on Disney+, but it was not picked up.

== Origin ==
=== Novels ===
The Walt Disney Company's Witch Mountain franchise is based on the 1968 science fiction novel Escape to Witch Mountain, written by Alexander Key. The events of the story follow two teenage orphans named Tony and Tia, who have paranormal abilities. The pair, who have little recollection of their past, are placed into a juvenile detention home by social services. After being released to a man self-described to be their "uncle", they discover his nefarious plans in using them for personal gain. Over the events of the book, the two remember their true nature as extraterrestrial life who came to Earth, when their home-planet was being destroyed. The duo escape with the remainder of their people, who call themselves "Castaways".

A sequel novel titled Return from Witch Mountain was released in 1978 by the Walt Disney Studios, to coincide with the release of their feature film of the same title. Key penned the novelization, based on the screenplay by Malcolm Marmorstein. It had originally been published in 1978 by the Westminster Press in Philadelphia, Pennsylvania.

=== Development ===
The Walt Disney Company released a 1975 feature film adaptation that was mostly faithful to the source material. The film was one of the studio's most successful live-action films at the time. Following the positive response to the film, the franchise continued with later installments.

== Films ==
Film	U.S. release date	Director	Screenwriter(s)	Story by	Producer(s)
Escape to Witch Mountain	March 21, 1975	John Hough	Robert M. Young	Robert M. Young	Ron Miller and Jerome Courtland
Return from Witch Mountain	March 10, 1978	John Hough	Malcolm Marmorstein	Malcolm Marmorstein	Ron Miller and Jerome Courtland
Beyond Witch Mountain	February 20, 1982	Robert Day	Robert M. Young and B.W. Sandefur & Hal Kanter	Robert Malcolm Young	Jan Williams
Escape to Witch Mountain	April 29, 1995	Peter Rader	Robert M. Young & Peter Rader	Robert Malcom Young	Joan Van Horn
Race to Witch Mountain	March 13, 2009	Andy Fickman	Matt Lopez & Mark Bomback	Matt Lopez	Andrew Gunn

=== Escape to Witch Mountain (1975) ===
Two teenage orphaned siblings, Tony and Tia Malone, secretly possess psychic powers. When those abilities attract attention from a villainous billionaire named Aristotle Bolt, the pair find themselves on the run. Bolt kidnaps them with plans to exploit their powers for his personal financial gain. Tony and Tia escape his containment, and with the help of a bitter widower named Jason O'Day they avoid Bolt's nefarious plans, and discover their other worldly origins.

=== Return from Witch Mountain (1978) ===
After previously escaping the greedy and scheming humans of Earth, Tony and Tia return for a vacation. While on their Earth-bound getaway, the pair attract the attention of another treacherous man. Doctor Gannon, and his henchwoman Letha, see the pair's abilities as an avenue in attaining riches. The villainous duo kidnap Tony, and use his power to sway Tia. She follows and pursues them, with a plan to free her brother.

=== Beyond Witch Mountain (1982) ===
A third installment was released exclusively through television broadcast in the early-1980s, beginning a decade-long trend of made-for-television sequels to, and remakes of, classic Walt Disney productions.

When reports of a boy's inexplicable abilities arise, Tony and Tia return to Earth. Knowing that the young boy must be from their world, the pair are sent to find the child. In their task, they are joined by Jason O'Day, their old friend. Together they race to find the boy, before a familiar nemesis (Aristotle Bolt) does.

=== Escape to Witch Mountain (1995) ===
Disney produced a remake of Escape to Witch Mountain for broadcast on The Magical World of Disney in 1995. Marketed as a remake of the original 1975 film, the story shares commonalities with the previous adaptation.

A pair of twin humanoid-alien babies are found near a mysterious mountain. Unintentionally separated, they grow in age unknowingly within the same town. Without knowledge of the other's existence, the pair eventually meet and learn that they both possess supernatural abilities. Upon discovering each other, a questionable local businessman decides to use the teenagers powers to make himself rich. On the run from these nefarious plans and with the support of other-worldly alliances, only the strange place known as Witch Mountain can save them.

=== Race to Witch Mountain (2009) ===
A remake or reboot, the film was released in theaters in 2009 and revived the franchise.

The plot tells the events surrounding a pair of extraterrestrial teenagers named Sara and Seth who have paranormal abilities, are in search of a way back to their home-planet, and drag a Las Vegas taxi driver named Jack Bruno into their adventures. Before an invasion from other worlds comes to Earth, the teens must find the location of their spaceship, which is buried within Witch Mountain. Bruno finds himself aiding the youth while evading government operatives and an alien bounty hunter/assassin who are fast on their trail.

== Television ==
In April 2019, a television series in the franchise was announced to be in development as a streaming exclusive release for Disney+.

By March 2021, the series had been green-lit for a pilot. The series is co-written by Terry Matalas and Travis Fickett, while John Davis and John Fox are serving as producers. The series is a joint-venture production between Disney Platform Distribution and Davis Entertainment. Simply titled Witch Mountain, it is a reimagining of the original film. With the premise based on the first film, the cast was announced with Bryce Dallas Howard, Isabel Gravitt, Levi Miller, Bianca Norwood, and Jackson Kelly. Disney ultimately passed on the series.

== Main cast and characters ==
List indicators

This section includes characters who will appear or have appeared in the franchise in main roles.

- An empty grey cell indicates the character was not in the film, or that the character's official presence has not yet been confirmed.
- ^{Y} indicates a younger version of the character.

Character	Films					Television series
Character	Escape to Witch Mountain	Return from Witch Mountain	Beyond Witch Mountain	Escape to Witch Mountain	Race to Witch Mountain	Witch Mountain
Tina "Tia" Malone	Kim Richards Kyle Richards^{Y}	Kim Richards	Tracey Gold		Kim Richards	Isabel Gravitt
Anthony "Tony" Malone	Ike Eisenmann	Ike Eisenmann	Andy Freeman		Ike Eisenmann	
Jason O'Day	Eddie Albert		Eddie Albert			
Uncle Bené	Denver Pyle	Denver Pyle	Noah Beery Jr.			
Anna Bolt				Elisabeth Moss Jennifer & Marissa Bullock^{Y}		
Danny Bolt				Erik von Detten Nikki & Sammi Allen^{Y}		
Waldo Fudd				Vincent Schiavelli		
Luthor				Brad Dourif		
Bruno				Brad Dourif		
Edward Bolt				Robert Vaughn		
Sara					AnnaSophia Robb	
Seth					Alexander Ludwig	
Jack Bruno					Dwayne Johnson	
Dr. Alex Friedman					Carla Gugino	
Henry Burke					Ciarán Hinds	
Audrey						Bryce Dallas Howard
Ben						Levi Miller
Corey						Bianca "b" Norwood
Peter						Jackson Kelly

== Additional crew and production details ==
Film	Crew/Detail					
Film	Composer	Cinematographer	Editor	Production companies	Distributing company	Running time
Escape to Witch Mountain	Johnny Mandel	Frank V. Phillips	Robert Stafford	Walt Disney Productions	Buena Vista Distribution Company	1hr 37mins
Return from Witch Mountain	Lalo Schifrin	Frank V. Phillips	Bob Bring	Walt Disney Productions	Buena Vista Distribution Company	1hr 35mins
Beyond Witch Mountain	George Duning	Jack A. Whitman Jr.	Gordon D. Brenner	Walt Disney Productions	Disney–ABC Domestic Television, Columbia Broadcasting System	47mins
Escape to Witch Mountain	Richard Marvin	Russ T. Alsobrook	Duane Hartzell	Buena Vista Television, Walt Disney Television, ABC Family Movie	Disney–ABC Domestic Television, American Broadcasting Company	1hr 27mins
Race to Witch Mountain	Trevor Rabin	Greg Gardiner	David Rennie	Walt Disney Pictures, Gunn Films, Sandman Studios	Walt Disney Studios Motion Pictures	1hr 38mins
Witch Mountain	TBA	TBA	TBA	Davis Entertainment, Disney Branded Television, ABC Signature Studios, Disney+ Original Films	Disney+	TBA

== Reception ==
=== Box office and financial performance ===
Film	Box office gross			Box office ranking		Video sales gross	Budget	Worldwide Total income	Ref.
Film	North America	Other territories	Worldwide	All time North America	All time worldwide	North America	Budget	Worldwide Total income	Ref.
Escape to Witch Mountain	$20,000,000	—N/a	$20,000,000	information unavailable	information unavailable	$8,500,000	information unavailable	$28,500,000	
Return from Witch Mountain	$6,393,000	—N/a	$6,393,000	information unavailable	information unavailable	$10,000,000	information unavailable	$16,393,000	
Beyond Witch Mountain	—N/a	information unavailable	—N/a	—N/a	—N/a	information unavailable	information unavailable	information unavailable	
Escape to Witch Mountain	—N/a	information unavailable	—N/a	—N/a	—N/a	information unavailable	information unavailable	information unavailable	
Race to Witch Mountain	$67,172,594	$39,214,547	$106,387,141	#1,227	#2,091	$41,619,672	$50,000,000	$98,006,813	

=== Critical and public response ===
Film	Rotten Tomatoes	Metacritic
Escape to Witch Mountain	76% (21 reviews)	60 (7 reviews)
Return from Witch Mountain	50% (10 reviews)	—N/a
Beyond Witch Mountain	—N/a	—N/a
Escape to Witch Mountain	—N/a	—N/a
Race to Witch Mountain	42% (153 reviews)	52 (28 reviews)
