= Witchcraft (disambiguation) =

Witchcraft has a wide range of meanings in anthropological, folkloric, mythological, and religious contexts.

Witchcraft may otherwise refer to:

- Neopagan witchcraft, umbrella term for syncretic earth-centered religious movements
  - Wicca, influential neopagan religion adapting Western esoteric practices

== Film ==
- Witchcraft (1916 film), a lost 1916 American drama silent film
- Witchcraft (1964 film), a horror film starring Lon Chaney Jr.
- Witchcraft (film series), a horror film series
  - Witchcraft (1988 film), the first film in the series
- La Casa 4, 1989 horror film starring Linda Blair and David Hasselhoff also released as Witchcraft

== Music ==
- Witchcraft (band), a Swedish band

=== Albums ===
- Witchcraft Destroys Minds & Reaps Souls, 1969 album by Coven
- Witchcraft (John Abercrombie album), 1991
- Witchcraft (Obtained Enslavement album), 1997
- Witchcraft (Stormwitch album), 2004
- Witchcraft (Witchcraft album), 2004
- Witchcraft (Claire Martin and Richard Rodney Bennett album), 2010

=== Songs ===
- "Witchcraft" (1955 song), a 1955 song by Dave Bartholomew and Pearl King which was an R&B hit that year for The Spiders and a 1963 B-side hit for Elvis Presley
- "Witchcraft" (1957 song), a 1957 song by Cy Coleman and Carolyn Leigh, best known in a recording by Frank Sinatra
- "Witchcraft" (Pendulum song), 2010
- "Witchcraft" (Book of Love song), 1989
- "Gila Monster / Witchcraft", a 2023 single by King Gizzard & the Lizard Wizard

== Other uses ==
- CJ Carella's WitchCraft, a role-playing game
- Witchcraft, a 2008 board game
- Witchcraft (clipper), a California clipper ship built in 1850 in Salem, Massachusetts
- Witchcraft, a cabin cruiser owned by Miami hotelier Dan Burack that disappeared in 1967
- "Witchcraft", the codename given to the intelligence produced by the source Merlin, in John le Carré's novel Tinker Tailor Soldier Spy

== See also ==
- Witch (disambiguation)
- Witchery (disambiguation)
