= Witch (disambiguation) =

A witch is a practitioner of witchcraft.

Witch, WITCH, or variations thereof may also refer to:

- Witch as a practitioner of neopagan witchcraft
- Witch as in a character/role in Fantasy Media; see Magician (fantasy)
- Witch (archetype), as it appears in psychology and literature
- Witch (word), the word "witch" itself

== Animals ==
- Witch (lefteye flounder) (Arnoglossus scapha), a Pacific flatfish
- Witch (righteye flounder) (Glyptocephalus cynoglossus), a European flatfish
- Araotes lapithis, the witch, a butterfly of India
- Megrim (Lepidorhombus whiffiagonis), sometimes known as witch

== Arts, entertainment, and media ==
=== Comics ===
- W.I.T.C.H., an Italian fantasy comics series first published in 2001
- Witches (Marvel Comics), a 2004 supernatural comic book mini-series published by Marvel Comics
- Wytches (comics), a 2014 horror comic series by Scott Snyder and Jock
- Witches (manga), a Japanese manga series

=== Fairy tales and literature ===
- Hag, or witch, a stock character in fairy tales
- The Witch (fairy tale), a Russian fairy tale
- The Witch (play), a 1616 play by Thomas Middleton
- "The Witch" (short story), an 1886 short story by Anton Chekhov
- The Witch (novel), a 1996 novel by Marie NDiaye
- The Witch, the English title of Anne Pederstotter (play) (1908)
- The Witches (novel), a children's book by Roald Dahl
- Witches (Discworld), witches as represented in Terry Pratchett's Discworld novels
- Three Witches, characters in the William Shakespeare play Macbeth
- Witches (anthology), an anthology of themed fantasy and science fiction short stories

=== Films ===
- Witch (film), a 1971 Egyptian television short film
- The Witch (1906 film), a French short silent film
- The Witch (1916 film), a lost American silent drama film
- Häxan, a 1922 Danish film, literally translated as "The Witch"
- The Witch (1952 film), a Finnish horror film
- The Witch (1954 film), a West German drama film
- La strega in amore, a 1966 Italian drama-horror film by Damiano Damiani also known as The Witch
- The Witches (1966 film), a British horror film
- The Witches (1967 film), an Italian-French anthology film
- The Witches (1990 film), a film based on Roald Dahl's book
- The Witch (2015 film), an American-Canadian horror film directed by Robert Eggers
- The Witch: Part 1. The Subversion, a 2018 South Korean action film
- The Witch: Part 2. The Other One, 2022 sequel to the 2018 South Korean film
- The Witches (2020 film), a film based on Roald Dahl's book
- Witches (2024 film) a British autobiographical documentary by Elizabeth Sankey
- Dahini: The Witch, a 2022 Indian film

=== Music ===
==== Groups ====
- Witch (American band), a doom/stoner metal band formed in 2005
- Witch (Zamrock band), a 1970s Zambian rock band
- The Witches, a 90s Israeli, all-female alternative/heavy rock trio led by Inbal Perlmuter
- The Wytches, an English rock band
- David Ryder Prangley and the Witches

==== Albums ====
- Witch (Witch album), a 2006 album by American band Witch
- Witch (In This Moment album), 2026
- Witch (Boyfriend EP), 2014
- Witch (Gangsta Boo and La Chat EP), 2014
- Wytches, a 1994 album by British rock band Inkubus Sukkubus
- The Witch (album), an album by Ambar
- Witches (album), a 2015 album by One-Eyed Doll

==== Songs ====
- "The Witch", a 1970 single by The Rattles
- "The Witch" (song), a 1965 song by The Sonics
- "The Witch", a 2004 song by Insane Clown Posse
- "W.I.T.C.H." (song), a 2022 song by Devon Cole
- "Witches" (song), a 1988 song by Miho Nakayama
- "Witches", a 2020 song by Alice Phoebe Lou

==== Other uses in music ====
- The Witch, a side project of Cold (band) started in 2006
- The Witches (opera), a 2008 opera by Marcus Paus

=== Television ===
- W.I.T.C.H. (TV series), a 2004 television series based on the eponymous comic book
- Witch (Buffy the Vampire Slayer), series episode
- Witches (What We Do in the Shadows), series episode
- The Witch (TV series), a 2025 South Korean TV series

=== Other uses in entertainment ===
- W.I.T.C.H. (video game), 2006 video game
- Witches (Mayfair Games), a supplement for fantasy role-playing games
- The Witch, an enemy featured in the Left 4 Dead franchise

== Ships ==
- Witch (catboat), a racing boat built in 1900
- HMS Waterwitch, the name of more than one ship of the Royal Navy
- HMS Witch (D89), a British destroyer in commission in the Royal Navy during the mid-1920s and from 1939 to 1945

== Other uses ==
- Witch of Agnesi, a mathematical curve
- Greenwood Witch, ultralight aircraft
- The Witch (ballet), John Cranko's 1931 ballet to Maurice Ravel's Piano Concerto No. 2 in G Major
- WITCH (computer), an early Dekatron computer renamed the Wolverhampton Instrument for Teaching Computing from Harwell
- WITCH experiment, a particle physics experiment
- Women's International Terrorist Conspiracy from Hell (W.I.T.C.H.), an American feminist organization
- WITCH, an acronym for the five largest Indian Big Tech consulting firms

== See also ==
- Hag
- -wich or -wych, placename element in -wich towns in England
- Witch Mountain (disambiguation)
- Witchcraft (disambiguation)
- Wych-elm, tree
