= Witchery (disambiguation) =

Witchery is a Swedish blackened thrash/speed metal band.

Witchery may also refer to:

- Witchery (company), an Australian fashion brand
- Witchery (film), a 1989 Italian horror film
- Witchery (magic), the use of magical powers
- "Witchery" (song), a 1977 song by Little River Band
- The Witchery, a restaurant and hotel in Edinburgh, Scotland

== See also ==
- Witchcraft (disambiguation)
