= Demon Hunter (film) =

2005 action/horror film directed by Mimi Leder

- Demon Hunter DVD cover
- Directed by: Scott Ziehl
- Written by: Mitch Gould
- Produced by: Stephen J. Cannell
- Starring: Sean Patrick Flanery; Colleen Porch; Billy Drago; William Bassett
- Cinematography: Robert C. New
- Edited by: Alan Cody
- Music by: Jon Lee
- Distributed by: Nelvana; Nelvana Limited
- Release date: June 8, 2005
- Running time: 78 minutes
- Country: United States
- Language: English

Demon Hunter is a 2005 action/horror film written by Mitch Gould and directed by Scott Ziehl. It stars Sean Patrick Flanery, Colleen Porch, William Bassett, Tania Deighton, and Billy Drago.

== Synopsis ==
Half human/half demon Jake Greyman works for the Catholic Church as the last resort to destroy demons along with their hosts when exorcism fails. After the Church notes a possible connection in a string of possessed girls, his superior Cardinal White puts him to work along Sister Sara Ryan to investigate it. They discover the girls were prostitutes and find mysterious demonic messages directed to Jake, who then reveals to have orders to kill the girls in case any of them might get pregnant with a demon's child. This drives a wedge between Jake and Sara in midst of their search for Nancy, the last woman of the list.

Jake and Sarah track Nancy to an abandoned hotel overtaken by Asmodeus, the demon of lust, who is luring them into a trap. Sarah chases the possessed Nancy while one of Asmodeus' succubi attempts to seduce Jake to enslave his soul, splitting them up. Sarah kills Nancy in self-defense, while Jake overpowers the succubus and arrives in time to save Nancy from Asmodeus himself next, but the demon defeats him, leaving them alive only on the promise that it will be indifferent for his plans.

Jake awakes to find Sarah missing, so he tracks Asmodeus down to a cemetery where the demon is performing a ritual. Asmodeus seduces Sarah and has sex with her, but in midst of the act, Sarah turns into a demon herself and kills him, devouring his heart. The deranged Sarah reveals to Jake to be a fellow human/demon hybrid all along, and upon failing to convince Jake to abandon God's side, she attacks him, leading him to kill her. Angry, Jake returns to the church and confronts White demanding to know wasn't told that Sarah was a half breed. He is told that not even Sarah herself know it, and that she was considered expendable.

The film ends with one of the prostitutes revealing to be pregnant with Asmodeus' child, only for Jake to appear and kill her.

== Cast ==
- Sean Patrick Flanery as Jacob “Jake” Greyman, a half demon who serves as the church’s executioner when exorcism fails
- Colleen Porch as Sister Sarah Ryan, Jake's partner, later revealed to be a demon-spawn
- William Bassett as Cardinal White, Jake and Sarah's employer
- Terrence Beasor as Bishop Desapio
- Billy Drago as Asmodeus, the Demon Lord of Lust and one of the original rebel angels who fell with Lucifer
- Tania Deighton as The Succubus, Asmodeus' servant
