= Devil Dog: The Hound of Hell =

- Film poster
- Genre: Thriller; Horror
- Written by: Elinor Karpf; Steven Karpf
- Directed by: Curtis Harrington
- Starring: Richard Crenna; Yvette Mimieux; Kim Richards; Ike Eisenmann
- Theme music composer: Artie Kane
- Country of origin: United States
- Original language: English

Production
- Executive producers: Hal Landers; Jerome M. Zeitman
- Producer: Lou Morheim
- Cinematography: Gerald Perry Finnerman
- Editors: Margo Anderson; Ronald J. Fagan
- Running time: 95 minutes
- Production company: Wizan Productions

Original release
- Network: CBS
- Release: October 31, 1978

Devil Dog: The Hound of Hell is a 1978 American TV movie directed by Curtis Harrington. The story centers on a suburban family and the experiences they endure from a possessed dog that they innocently adopt. The film stars Richard Crenna as Mike Barry, the father; Yvette Mimieux as Betty, the mother; and Kim Richards and Ike Eisenmann as Bonnie and Charlie, their children. The two child actors previously played siblings in the Witch Mountain films from Walt Disney Productions.

== Plot ==
The Barry family acquire a German Shepherd puppy after their old one died in an accident. They get the puppy from a seemingly friendly fruit vendor who is a Satanist who bred the dog during an evil ceremony, causing it to be possessed. The Satanic cult then gives away the dog's offspring to wreak havoc in the world in the hope that Satan will overcome good once and for all. The Barry family names the dog Lucky.

Lucky acts very strangely when they bring him home, leading the father, Mike, and the family maid to believe that there is something wrong with him. Mike starts to believe so after the maid is killed in a fire while she was watching Lucky, and he is nearly forced to stick his arm into a lawnmower while it is running while Lucky is present. Mike barely avoids having his arm cut off and soon, Lucky begins to exhibit mind control powers that allow it to kill, injure, or mentally control many victims. Eventually, the family's souls are possessed by Lucky, causing them to act strangely, including Mike's son framing another student by stealing a watch and planting it in a classmate's locker, thus allowing him to win the student election.

Mike finally decides that Lucky has overstayed his welcome when he finds a secret shrine to Satan in the attic. Mike tries to shoot the demonic beast to put an end to the hardships, but he is unharmed. Realizing that the dog is possessed, Mike finally makes a special trip to Ecuador to determine how to destroy the animal. Unfortunately, there is no way to kill it, but if you hold a holy symbol to its eye, you can imprison it in Hell for 1,000 years. He takes Lucky to a showdown at his work plant, but there Lucky turns into a demonic version of himself and begins to pursue Mike. When Mike is cornered by Lucky, he holds the sign he made in his hand right up to the beast's eye. This causes Lucky to be engulfed in fire and imprisoned, getting his family's souls back.

The final scene shows the family loading the family car for a vacation and Mike's son mentioning that there were 10 puppies that the vendor was selling and wondering where the other nine are, suggesting that there are more Satanic dogs out there somewhere and that it is not over yet.

== Cast ==
- Richard Crenna as Mike Barry
- Yvette Mimieux as Betty Barry
- Kim Richards as Bonnie Barry
- Ike Eisenmann as Charlie Barry (as Ike Eisenman)
- Tina Menard as Maria
- Victor Jory as Shaman
- Lou Frizzell as George
- Ken Kercheval as Miles Amory
- R.G. Armstrong as Dunworth
- Martine Beswick as Red-Haired Lady
- Bob Navarro as Newscaster
- Lois Ursone as Gloria Hadley
- Jerry Fogel as Doctor Norm
- Warren Munson as Superintendent
- James Reynolds as Policeman
- Gertrude Flynn as Occultist

== Home video ==
The movie was released on DVD by Media Blasters under its Shriek Show imprint on October 25, 2005. Media Blasters later re-released the movie under the same imprint on February 13, 2007, as part of its three-disc Evil Animals Triple Feature, along with Grizzly and Day of the Animals. On July 26, 2011, the movie was released on Blu-ray.

== Reception ==
Debi Moore from Dread Central rated the film a score of three out of five, calling it "a fun throwback that manages to provide its fair share of creepy, claustrophobic moments for as long as the audience can put aside the overt silliness of the concept." Terror Trap awarded the film three out of four stars, noting the film's implausible story while stating that the film was entertaining and featured decent performances by Crenna and Mimieux.
