= Masato Yamanouchi =

Japanese voice actor (1929–2003)

- Japanese: 山内 雅人
- Born: Mikio Yamauchi (山内 幹雄); April 3, 1929; Meguro, Tokyo, Japan
- Died: April 7, 2003 (aged 74); Meguro, Tokyo, Japan
- Occupations: Voice actor, actor, narrator
- Years active: 1945-2003

Masato Yamanouchi (山内 雅人, Yamanouchi Masato; April 3, 1929, in Tokyo – April 7, 2003, in Tokyo) was a Japanese voice actor. Over the course of his 58-year career, he was reportedly in more than 20,000 works and dubbed more than 3,000 films. He voiced Grandpa in Future Boy Conan and Dornkirk in The Vision of Escaflowne, and dubbed films for actors including Tyrone Power and Montgomery Clift.

== Early life and education ==
Yamanouchi was born Mikio Yamauchi (山内 幹雄) on April 3, 1929, in Tokyo. He attended Shiba Junior High School, Waseda University School of Law, and Kamakura Academia's theatre program. While at Waseda, he founded Jiyu Butai, a theatre troupe.

== Career ==
In 1945, Yamanouchi joined the NHK Tokyo Broadcasting Company, where he hosted a radio show and debuted as a voice actor in Fuefuki Dōji as Kirino Kojiro. His early training for voice roles centered on dramatic reading, which he initially performed in coffee shops. In 1949, he and linguist Haruhiko Kindaichi started the Broadcast Expression Education Center, where they worked on preserving the Edo language. They began accepting students for dramatic reading, making them the first recitation school in Japan. The center was supported by the NHK's Cultural Fund. After leaving NHK in 1977, Yamanouchi worked for K Production, then became a freelancer.

In 1975, he received the NHK Broadcasting Operation Director's Award and the Arts Festival Award for Excellence in the drama category.

== Death ==
Yamanouchi died on April 7, 2003, in Meguro, the same Tokyo ward in which he was born, due to complications from lung cancer. He was survived by his widow, Yasuko.

== Filmography ==
Year	Title (in English)	Title (in Japanese)	Type	Role	Ref
1963	The Little Prince and the Eight-Headed Dragon	わんぱく王子の大蛇退治	Animated film	Wadatsumi; Kushinada-Hime's father	
1964	Akō Rōshi	赤穂浪士	TV drama	Uesugi Tsunanori	
1966	Cyborg 009	サイボーグ・ゼロ・ゼロ・ナイン	Animated film	Black Ghost	
1977	Rascal the Raccoon	あらいぐまラスカル	TV animation	Willard North	
1978	Future Boy Conan	未来少年コナン	TV animation	Grandpa, Dr. Lao	
1979	Lupin the 3rd Part II	ルパン三世	TV animation	Napoleon the Eleventh	
1983	Tokugawa Ieyasu	徳川 家康	TV drama	Ikoma Chikamasa	
1994	Armored Trooper Votoms: Brilliantly Shining Heresy	装甲騎兵ボトムズ 赫奕たる異端	OVA	Viacheslav da Montewells	
1995	Catnapped!	とつぜん！猫の国 バニパルウィット	Animated drama	Master Sandada	
1995	Ghost in the Shell	攻殻機動隊	Animated drama	Foreign Minister	
1996	The Vision of Escaflowne	天空のエスカフローネ	TV animation	Dornkirk	
1998	Silent Möbius	サイレントメビウス	TV animation	Kōhō Yamigumo	

=== Dubbing roles ===
Year	Title	Original actor	Role	Notes	Ref
1938	Suez	Tyrone Power	Ferdinand de Lesseps		
1940	The Mark of Zorro	Tyrone Power	Don Diego Vega/Zorro		
1941	Blood and Sand	Tyrone Power	Juan Gallardo		
1943	Crash Dive	Tyrone Power	Lt. Ward Stewart		
1948	Red River	Montgomery Clift	Matthew "Matt" Garth		
1951	The Day the Earth Stood Still	Hugh Marlowe	Tom Stevens		
1953	From Here to Eternity	Montgomery Clift	Private Robert E. Lee "Prew" Prewitt	TV edition	
1953	Terminal Station	Montgomery Clift	Giovanni Doria	TV edition	
1953	Roman Holiday	Eddie Albert	Irving Radovich	1972 Fuji TV edition	
1955	The Long Gray Line	Tyrone Power	Martin Maher		
1955	Untamed	Tyrone Power	Paul van Riebeck		
1956	The Eddy Duchin Story	Tyrone Power	Eddy Duchin		
1957	Raintree County	Montgomery Clift	John Wickliff Shawnessey		
1957	Witness for the Prosecution	Tyrone Power	Leonard Vole		
1957	12 Angry Men	Edward Binns	Juror #6	1974 NTV edition	
1959	Suddenly, Last Summer	Montgomery Clift	Dr. Cukrowicz		
1961	Judgment at Nuremberg	Montgomery Clift	Rudolph Peterson	TV edition	
1961	The Misfits	Montgomery Clift	Perce Howland	1966 TV Asahi edition	
1962	Freud: The Secret Passion	Montgomery Clift	Sigmund Freud		
1966	The Defector	Montgomery Clift	Prof. James Bower		
1970	Cold Sweat	Jean Topart	Katanga	1979 NTV edition	
1972	The Godfather	Al Martino	Johnny Fontane	1976 NTV edition	
1973	The Sting	Dana Elcar	FBI Agent Polk		
1974	Earthquake	Lorne Greene	Sam Royce	1986 TV Asahi edition	
1987	Wall Street	Martin Sheen	Carl Fox		
1987	The Last Emperor	Cary-Hiroyuki Tagawa	Chang	1989 TV Asahi edition	
1987	The Running Man	Richard Dawson	Damon Killian	1990 TV Asahi edition	
1990	The Exorcist III	Ed Flanders	Father Dyer		
1991	Dead Again	Derek Jacobi	Franklyn Madson		
1991	Terminator 2: Judgment Day	Earl Boen	Dr. Peter Silberman		
1995	Braveheart	Patrick McGoohan	Edward "Longshanks" I	1999 TV Asahi edition	
1997	12 Angry Men	George C. Scott	Juror #3		
1997	Amistad	Anthony Hopkins	John Quincy Adams		
1998	Meet Joe Black	Anthony Hopkins	William Parrish		
?	The X-Files	William B. Davis	Cigarette Smoking Man		
