= Future Boy Conan =

Japanese anime series

- Promotional artwork for the series

未来少年コナン (Mirai Shōnen Konan)
- Genre: Adventure; Post-apocalyptic; Steampunk
- Anime television series
- Directed by: Hayao Miyazaki
- Produced by: Junzō Nakajima; Shigeo Endō
- Written by: Akira Nakano; Satoshi Kurumi; Sōji Yoshikawa
- Music by: Shin'ichirō Ikebe
- Studio: Nippon Animation
- Licensed by: NA: GKIDS; UK: Anime Limited; SA/SEA: Medialink
- Original network: NHK General TV
- English network: SEA: Animax Asia
- Original run: April 4, 1978 – October 31, 1978
- Episodes: 26
- Anime film
- Directed by: Hajime Sato
- Produced by: Juichi Honbashi
- Written by: Eiichi Imado
- Music by: Fujiji Fujiji
- Studio: Nippon Animation
- Released: September 15, 1979
- Runtime: 122 minutes
- Anime film

The Big Giant Robot's Resurrection
- Directed by: Hayao Miyazaki
- Produced by: Junzō Nakajima; Shigeo Endō
- Written by: Kensho Nakano
- Music by: Shin'ichirō Ikebe
- Studio: Nippon Animation
- Released: March 11, 1984
- Runtime: 49 minutes
- Anime television series

Future Boy Conan II: Taiga Adventure
- Directed by: Keiji Hayakawa
- Written by: Sadahiko Sakamaki
- Music by: Gorō Oumi
- Studio: Nippon Animation
- Original network: JNN (TBS)
- Original run: October 16, 1999 – April 1, 2000
- Episodes: 24
- icon

Future Boy Conan (未来少年コナン, Mirai Shōnen Konan), also known as Conan, The Boy in Future, is a Japanese post-apocalyptic science fiction anime series. It is an adaptation of American science-fiction writer Alexander Key's 1970 novel The Incredible Tide. It was broadcast for twenty-six episodes on NHK General TV between April and October 1978.

A spin-off series, Future Boy Conan II: Taiga Adventure aired for twenty-four episodes on TBS from October 1999 to April 2000.

== Story ==
The story begins in July 2008, during a time when mankind is faced with the threat of extinction. A devastating war fought with ultra-magnetic weapons far greater than anything seen earlier brings about a post-apocalyptic world, resulting in several earthquakes and tsunamis. The Earth is thrown off its axis, its crust rocked by massive movements, and the continents are torn completely apart and sink deep below the sea.

An attempt by a group of people to flee to outer space failed, with their spaceships being forced back on Earth and crashing on a small desert and dry island. Although initially desperate, the survivors discover that the crash landing has opened a freshwater well, and gradually life returns to the island. The crew members of the spaceship gradually settle on what they call 'Remnant Island' and they lead a simple and happy life as an extended family. A new baby, Conan, is eventually born within the community in October 2010.

Year after year the older survivors die off in their isolation and unaware of the sort of humanity beyond the small island, until the only people left are Conan and his adoptive grandfather. One day Conan finds on the beach a young girl named Lana, the first stranger and person of his own age whom he had ever known. Lana was raised on another surviving island called High Harbor, where a simple society has re-developed in close contact with nature. She has ended up on Conan's island while trying to escape from abduction by the crew of the Barracuda, a sailing ship from the leftover of the old world, Industria. Industria is in desperate need of energy, having barely managed to continue its highly industrialized economy through careful husbandry of a backup nuclear reactor, and devolving into a caste-based dystopia. The main resource of highly concentrated orbital-based solar power has become unavailable after the disappearance of Lana's grandfather, Dr. Lao, who has gone into hiding after the war in order to avoid further military usage of his research: a power that could rebuild the world, but which was also the weapon that brought humanity to the brink of apocalypse during the last conflict.

Soon another crew from Industria manages to locate Lana. In the altercation, Conan's grandfather is killed and the boy is initially abandoned alone on the now-desert island. He decides to take his chances with the unknown ocean on a simple raft, in order to try and save his new friend Lana. In his journey he first meets another young boy, Jimsy, who grew up in semi-feral status on yet another island, where the Barracuda makes regular trips in order to acquire plastic rubbish to be converted back into oil at the Industria facilities. The rubbish is mined by the impoverished and still war-traumatized local population, in exchange for simple trinkets, alcoholic beverages and surrogate cigarettes.

Conan and Jimsy soon begin to socialize and also decide to raid the ship, respectively to save Lana and to steal its goods. The attempt fails and they are punished and forced into labor by the captain. The group is eventually brought to Industria and separated and reunited again various times, as the situation on that island further degenerates due to further natural disasters and the deteriorating social fabric, turning more and more into a dictatorship under the Director. Over the course of the story, he is the only irredeemable figure, devoid of any scruples and ever greedy for power at any cost. All the other characters, including the minor ones, develop significantly in response to events and in particular after being exposed to the selfless example of Conan. A pure love story also develops with Lana. After multiple separations and various challenges, the group eventually locates Dr. Lao, restores access to solar power just in time to salvage another ship and evacuate Industria just before another cataclysmic earthquake, and finally destroys the super-weapon which the Director was trying to deploy in order to maintain his hegemony over High Harbour and all the other remaining lands. As the last legacy of the society responsible for the apocalypse dies off, nature continues its recovery process, new families are founded, and the younger, still innocent but now more mature Lana and Conan set sail to build a new world that keeps only the positive aspects of the past.

== Characters ==
Conan (コナン, Konan)
Voiced by: Noriko Ohara (Japanese); Sabrina Pitre (English)
Conan is a fearless 11-year-old boy who was born on Remnant Island and raised by all survivors of a failed escape attempt into space from the Great Disaster. Conan is very attuned to his rural, secluded lifestyle, where he has grown up mainly in the company of the oldest surviving crew member, his adoptive grandfather. Conan is inexperienced but an intelligent, strong, and exceptional athlete, underwater swimmer, and spear-fisher. Despite his lack of social exposure, he is gentle and can quickly integrate among strangers. Deciding to rescue Lana in a self-constructed sailboat after his grandfather's killing and Lana's subsequent capture, Conan meets new friends and acquaintances while becoming caught up in Lepka's plots for Industria and High Harbor.
Lana (ラナ, Rana)
Voiced by: Mieko Nobusawa (Japanese); Lili Beadoin (English)
Lana is a quiet, soft-spoken girl from High Harbor and the granddaughter of Dr. Lao, to whom she is very devoted. Lana, who is also 11 years old, is found by Conan as she washed up unconscious on the shore of Remnant Island. She is the first girl, or person altogether beside his grandfather, whom the boy has ever seen. His initial curiosity and infatuation gradually develop into deeper feelings and reciprocal desire to stay together, no matter risks and adversities. Lana appears to also have some telepathic connection with her grandfather Dr. Rao, and to some extent also with birds and in particular a tern named Tikki. As her affection for Conan grows, a similar empathic bond also begins to form with the boy.
Jimsy (ジムシィ, Jimushī)
Voiced by: Kazuyo Aoki (Japanese); Erin Mathews (English)
Jimsy is a semi-feral boy living alone on the first island Conan arrives at, Jimsy quickly becomes Conan's first friend, helping him rescue Lana. Jimsy is a master hunter (with a particular preference for grilled frogs and lizards), proficient in hunting with his bow and able to compete with Conan in other athletic skills almost to a draw. He has a good but rather hedonistic and wild nature, which tends to place him in troubles as he attempts to steal food, liquor and surrogate cigarettes. Jimsy ends up spending most of his time with Dyce after Conan and Lana are separated from the party. Initially, Jimsy has a negative view on women, but he gradually forms a relationship with Tera at the end of the series.
Lepka (レプカ, Repuka)
Voiced by: Iemasa Kayumi (Japanese); Alex Zahara (English)
The head of administration of Industria, Lepka technically serves under the Industria High Committee, a group of benevolent but old and naive scientists. Over the course of the series he becomes increasingly tyrannical and eventually stages a coup to become the sole dictator of Industria. He is the primary antagonist, cruel even with his loyal accomplices and always greedy for power, even attempting to restore a war-time superweapon to rule over what remains of the world.
Dr. Briac Lao (ラオ博士, Rao-hakase)
Voiced by: Masato Yamanouchi (Japanese); Hiro Kanagawa (English)
The grandfather of Lana, and the scientist responsible for the development of solar power for both civil and wartime usage. Originally a member of Industria's High Council, he defected after he learned of Lepka's power-driven ambitions, and hid under the cover identity of a hard-handed salvaging crew captain named Patch. He believes that the people of Industria must be taught to discard their weapons and begin new lives in peace. For this reason he escaped, bringing with him the secret of how to access the last orbiting solar power station from pre-war times.
Monsley (モンスリー, Monsurī)
Voiced by: Rihoko Yoshida (Japanese); Kazumi Evans (English)
The young assistant director of Industria's Administration forces. As a young girl, she was her family's only survivor when the final war broke out and the Earth was devastated; and as a result of that tragedy, she became a harsh, uncaring enforcer. She is tasked by Lepka to capture Lana, and eventually leads the invasion of Industria against High Harbor. However, as she encounters Conan, she is gradually swayed by his unwavering courage and sincerity, and eventually joins him and his friends in taking down Lepka.
Dyce (ダイス, Daisu)
Voiced by: Ichirō Nagai (Japanese); Aaron Chapman (English)
Dyce is a citizen of Industria, and the captain of the plastic-salvaging ship Barracuda. He was originally ordered to track down Dr. Briac Lao, Lana's grandfather, and convey the girl to Industria, but ended up developing an affection for Lana, enabling her to escape to Remnant Island. Fed up with Lepka's cruelty towards Lana, he eventually becomes one of Conan's allies, helping to overthrow Industria's regime in their exploits. He is a comically inept character, and often makes it out alive only by pure luck in his fights with Industria's forces.
Luke (ルーケ, Rūke)
Voiced by: Hideyuki Tanaka
The leader of an underground cell composed of Industria's lower-class/slave citizenry. He is an old ally of Dr. Lao in the latter's attempts to improve the lives of the city's downtrodden people, and was repeatedly arrested and charged and even branded for rebellion. During one stint in prison, he and his compatriots are freed by Conan and in turn aid him and his friends in navigating the underground city beneath Industria's Triangle Tower, which is riddled with secret passages only the resistance knows about.
Orlo (オーロ, Ōro)
Voiced by: Hiroya Ishimaru
Orlo is the young, rebellious leader of a rogue gang based in the mountains of High Harbor, who tax whoever the gang catches crossing their territory. He originates from a village of herders on the other side of High Harbor island, but turned into a bullying outlaw after he found honest work to be unsatisfactory. He plots to become the leader of High Harbor, thus cooperates with the Industrians when they invade the island, bringing down the villager's defenses. However, when a tidal wave hits the island and the Industrians subsequently surrender, his plans are permanently dashed. In the end, he finds his place back among his fellow islanders.
Tera (テラ)
Voiced by: Noriko Tsukase
Orlo's younger sister, about the same age as Conan and Jimsy, and the deputy leader of Orlo's men. She and Jimsy quickly take a liking to each other, but their radically diverging views of life prevent them from reaching a common ground at first. During the Industrian invasion of High Harbor, she is rescued by Jimsy and Conan, which breaks down the barrier between them, and they become a couple.
Grandpa (おじい, Ojī)
Voiced by: Masato Yamanouchi (Japanese); John Innes (English)
Conan's adoptive and elderly grandfather, who raised him on Remnant Island. Originally part of a crew of people escaping from the largely destroyed Earth, their spaceship crashed back down, miraculously landing on Remnant Island, with all the members surviving, including Conan's grandfather. With every other crew member dying soon after Conan's birth, he was left to raise Conan alone for 11 years, taking him as his adopted grandson. However, after being attacked by Industrian soldiers during Lana's abduction, he dies from his injuries. In the later course of his adventures, however, Conan encounters an Industrian low-class citizen who bears a striking resemblance to his grandfather.
Umasō (うまそう)
Umasō is Jimsy's pet piglet which he acquired after becoming a pig herder on High Harbor Island.
Kuzo (クズゥ, Kuzū)
Voiced by: Tetsuo Mizutori (Japanese); Ian Hanlin (English)
Kuzo is one of Monsley's subordinates.
Dongoro (ドンゴロス, Dongorosu)
Voiced by: Takuzō Kamiyama (Japanese); Michael Adamthwaite (English)
Pasco (パスコ, Pasuko)
Voiced by: Masaru Ikeda
Gucchi (グッチ)
Voiced by: Hiroshi Masuoka (Japanese); Michael Dobson (English)

== Production ==
Spanning a total of 26 episodes, the series was produced by Nippon Animation and featured the solo directorial debut of Hayao Miyazaki, (Note: Miyazaki earlier directed a Yuki's Sun pilot, but it was not picked up.) who also contributed to character designs and storyboards. It is the only television series Miyazaki fully directed. Other future prominent anime creators like Isao Takahata (storyboards, directing) and Yoshiyuki Tomino (storyboards) also worked on the series.

Nippon Animation originally presented NHK with several proposals. At first a different story was favored, but eventually, The Incredible Tide novel was chosen.

There was a preparation time of three months for the layout. Six months passed between the start of the key animation work and the airing of the first episode. Although a stock of eight episodes was already produced by that time, the show still went behind schedule. According to Miyazaki it "took [them] from ten days to two weeks to produce a single episode" and that if "NHK hadn't inserted a special program in there as a padding, it probably would have turned into a real wreck of a series. If we hadn't been working for NHK, we never could have pulled Conan off."

The staff was willing to work on a more upbeat story after 3000 Leagues in Search of Mother.

In a 1983 interview with Yōkō Tomizawa from Animage, Miyazaki stated that he only worked on the show under the condition that he was allowed to change the story. He disliked the pessimistic world view of the original story, feeling it was a reflection of Alexander Key's own fears and insecurities. He wanted a story aimed at children to be more optimistic, stating "[e]ven if someone's lost all hope for the future, I think it is incredibly stupid to go around stressing this to children. Emphasize it to adults if you have to, but there's no need to do so to children. It would be better to simply not say anything at all."

Miyazaki further made an effort to distance himself from the notion of High Harbor representing North America and Industria representing the Soviet Union. In order to do this, he even considered making the setting more Japanese. For example, in his version of the story, the people of High Harbor would grow rice instead of wheat and eat using chopsticks. But this "would have led to all sorts of other problems", so he eventually dropped the idea.

One scene of Jimsy smoking cigarettes was removed by NHK before the airing of the episode. Miyazaki admitted that he put "way too much of [his] own feelings into episode eight", specifically the underwater "kiss" scene. He had grown fonder of Lana by episode 5 and 6 and "realized that [the show] incorporated the exact same story line of a manga [he] had created back in [his] student days" to the point where even the shots were arranged in the same way.

=== Theme songs ===
- Opening theme: Ima Chikyū ga Mezameru (今地球がめざめる, Now, the Earth Awakens) (performance: Naozumi Kamata, Yūko Yamaji)
- Ending theme: Shiawase no Yokan (幸せの予感, Premonition of Happiness) (performance: Naozumi Kamata, Yūko Yamaji)

== Release ==
Future Boy Conan first aired across Japan on the NHK TV network between April 4 and October 31, 1978. It has been regularly broadcast across Japan on the anime satellite television network Animax, who have also later translated and dubbed the series into English for broadcast across its respective English-language networks in Southeast Asia and South Asia, under the title Conan, The Boy in Future.

A compilation film of the series was released in theaters on September 15, 1979, and shown together with Yakyū-kyō no Uta: Kita no Ōkami, Minami no Tora film.

A compilation film of the last three episodes of the series, Future Boy Conan: The Big Giant Robot's Resurrection was released in theaters on March 11, 1984, and shown together with Witch Era. It was released the same day as Nausicaa of the Valley of the Wind.

=== North America and UK release ===
On July 8, 2021, GKIDS licensed the TV series with a new English dub and a 4K restoration. GKIDS released a four-disc Blu-Ray set of the complete series on November 16, 2021, alongside a digital release. On September 28, 2021, Anime Limited announced they got the license for the series for the UK. Anime Limited released the show in a two part collector's edition set with Part 1 released on June 27 and Part 2 on July 25, 2022, on Blu-Ray and 4K UHD, making it the first 4K release of the series anywhere in the world. The series began streaming exclusively on the RetroCrush platform on April 18, 2025.

== Video games ==
A video game version of the series by Telenet Japan was released in 1992 on NEC's PC Engine console. The game was released on the Super CD-ROM² format and was only available in Japan. On October 20, 1995, another game titled Conan, The Boy in Future: Digital Library (未来少年コナンノデジタルライブラリー), was exclusively released on the 3DO, and was developed by Bandai Visual and published by Emotion Digital Software. The game also is exclusive in Japan, and is extremely rare. Two clips of the Intersound, Inc pilot English dub appeared in the game. Another video game adaptation of the series was released for the PlayStation 2 home console on August 25, 2005, only in Japan.

In 2005, a pachinko game titled Future Boy Conan was released. In January 2011, NewGin announced another pachinko game titled Future Boy Conan: Love and Courage and Adventure (未来少年コナン〜愛と勇気と冒険と〜, Mirai Shōnen Konan: Ai to Yūki to Bōken). A pachislot game titled Future Boy Conan was also released the same year.

== Reception and legacy ==
In a 1983 interview with Yōko Yomizawa, Hayao Miyazaki acknowledged that ratings for the show had not been very good, noting that episode 25 had received the highest rating at 14 percent.

In her 1999 book Hayao Miyazaki: Master of Japanese Animation, Helen McCarthy identifies Conan as a "seminal" work and recognizes themes and story elements in this production which Miyazaki would continue to explore throughout his career. McCarthy also notes continuity in the development of the characters and their plight throughout Miyazaki's work. She sees Lana and Conan as precedents for his later heroines and characters, and mentions, among others, Sheeta's rescue by Pazu, from Miyazaki's 1986 animated feature film Castle in the Sky, as an example. In 2013, anime director Kenji Kamiyama, most known for the Ghost in the Shell: Stand Alone Complex series, cited the series among the 15 best anime of all time.

A redrawn and renamed version of Future Boy Conan appears in the anime Keep Your Hands Off Eizouken!, where it is foundational to the main character's love of anime.

The screenwriter Chiaki Konaka has cited Future Boy Conan as a key reference model for the production of the 2001 anime Digimon Tamers.

The Encyclopedia of Science Fiction described Future Boy Conan as an impressive early work by Hayao Miyazaki, identifying themes that would recur throughout his career, including environmentalism, opposition to fascism, strong female characters and a fascination with aircraft. It noted that the series' criticism of industrialization and technological obsession does not extend to science itself, portraying its scientists as generally well-intentioned. The encyclopedia praised the animation as remarkably accomplished for its time and budget, highlighting its distinctive visual style and imaginative depictions of overgrown technological structures. It considered the characterization uneven, contrasting the simplistic villain Lepka with the more complex and redeemable Monsley, whose transformation it nevertheless found somewhat abrupt. It also criticized Monsley's unconvincing romance with Captain Dyce. Although finding the series overlong and more simplistic than Miyazaki's later productions, the encyclopedia concluded that it had aged well.

== Taiga Adventure ==
Future Boy Conan II: Taiga Adventure (未来少年コナンII タイガアドベンチャー, Mirai Shōnen Konan Tsū: Taiga Adobenchā) is a spin-off centered around a boy named Taiga and his adventure in the world of magical artifacts known as OOPArts. The central OOPArt, known as Obats (オーバッツ, Ōbattsu), is a giant living statue, and it is on its path to bring forth doom to the world as it collects other OOPArts and becomes more powerful.

=== Characters ===
Taiga (タイガ)
A robust young boy who travels with his archaeologist father to ruins around the world. Conflicts arise once they accidentally awake the magical artifact Obats. Taiga then has to chase it and try to acquire key OOPArts before Obats can get them.
Tiana (ティアナ)
A young girl who likes riding her motorcycle. Her father is also an archaeologist. She is chosen to be the host of the energy harvested from Obats.
Gosh (ゴシュ, Goshu)
A "tribalesque" jungle boy who believes everything his TV says, including how to talk to girls. He becomes Taiga's best friend.
Obats (オーバッツ, Ōbattsu)
The apocalyptic giant living OOPArt. It originally takes the form of a giant bird, but after being awakened, it begins to head for places where other key magical OOPArts are kept, at the same time takes various forms, such a giant mole, a giant fish monster, a giant bat, a giant sphinx, etc.
