= Inquizition =

American game show

- Genre: Game show
- Created by: Sande Stewart
- Presented by: William H. Bassett as "The Inquizitor"
- Country of origin: United States
- No. of seasons: 3

Production
- Producer: Sande Stewart
- Running time: approx. 22 minutes
- Production companies: Sande Stewart Television; Game Show Enterprises

Original release
- Network: Game Show Network
- Release: October 5, 1998 – October 19, 2001

Inquizition is an American game show. Created by Sande Stewart Television, it aired on Game Show Network from October 5, 1998 to October 19, 2001.

The game, hosted by an unknown figure named "The Inquizitor," featured four studio contestants competing to win a cash prize by answering questions. Four home viewers also took part in each episode, playing by telephone to win cash and prizes.

== Gameplay ==
Four contestants competed in a studio made to resemble a large, empty airplane hangar, which accomplished with a green screen. Additionally, four more contestants played along at home against each other in a parallel game over the telephone (one of several shows on GSN that did this). Studio players wore black t-shirts under smocks in various colors, and would bow to the Inquizitor when first introduced.

The game was played in three rounds, each consisting of approximately 20–25 multiple-choice questions. Each question had three possible answers (A, B, or C; "C" was always "none of the above"). The contestants had three seconds to lock in an answer by pressing one of the buttons on their podiums, their answers visible only to the Inquizitor and viewing audience. Each correct response awarded one point, with no penalty for wrong answers; the scores were displayed on the podiums after each question, but were not announced at any point during gameplay.

When time expired at the end of each round, the contestant with the lowest score was eliminated and dismissed by the Inquizitor. The losing player turned around, as if to walk away, and the screen faded to white. The scores were reset for each new round. After round 3, the remaining contestant collected his or her "papers" (a prop sometimes seen briefly on-camera, similar to a diploma) and a $500 cash prize ($250 in season 1). Telephone contestants played for the same prize as the studio contestants, with some also winning online gift certificates.

In the case of a tie in either the show or the telephone game, additional questions were asked until the tie was broken.

== Production ==
=== Development ===
Stewart developed the show from a basic idea by producer Jake Tabba. Stewart envisioned Area 51 as the oddest place to hold a game show, which inspired the aircraft hangar setting. The show's opening and closing credits were filmed at Van Nuys Airport at a cost of $80,000, an extravagance compared to the show's low production overhead. Game Show Network gave Stewart freedom in developing the show due to its very low cost, which included two unmanned cameras, a small number of writers, and a modest salary of $500 per show for its host.

=== The Inquizitor ===
Inquizition's unconventional host, "The Inquizitor," was described as "a mysterious, brooding man who sits with his back to the camera. He speaks in an authoritative baritone, making curt decisions and showing a general distaste for the contestants." The Inquizitor frequently expressed contempt for under-performing players while offering occasional muted praise to well-performing players. Stewart said he would usually cast one less gifted player in order to tee up the pre-written insults delivered by the Inquizitor. At the end of the show, the Inquizitor would unceremoniously dismiss the winner, sometimes ordering him to return to his mundane life. The ending credits then showed the Inquizitor walking out of the hangar with a menacing cackle.

The Inquizitor never showed his face during the show's three-year run, his identity remaining unknown due to a stipulation in his contract. In 2024, Stewart revealed he was played by actor William H. Bassett.

== See also ==
- 100% (a similar game show that aired in limited syndication in the US in 1999; and on Five in the UK from 1997 to 2001)
