= Peter Hobbs (actor) =

American actor (1918–2011)

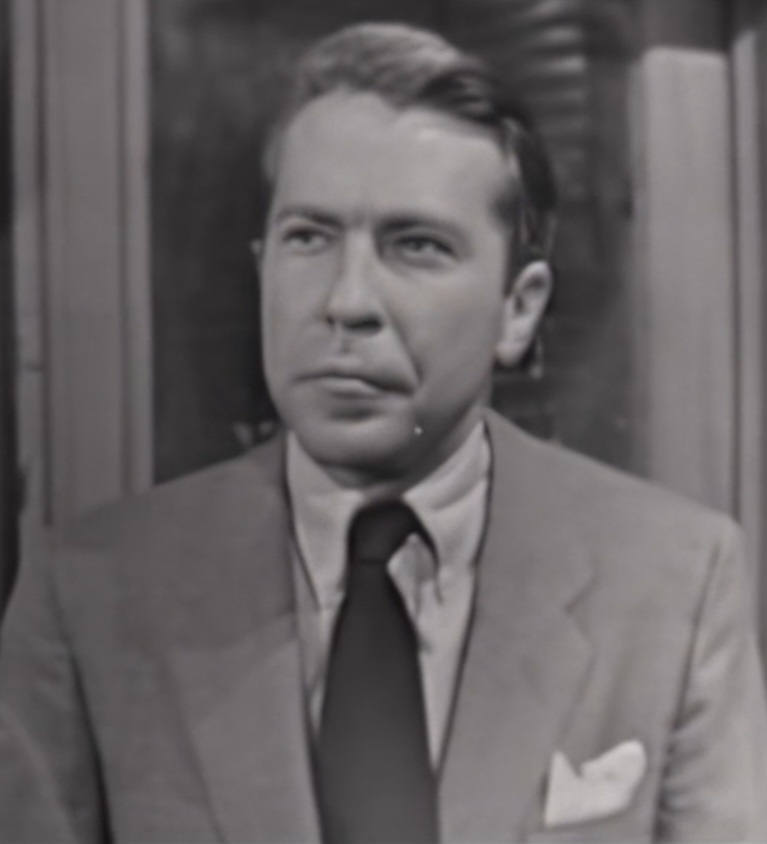
- Hobbs in the TV series Suspense (1953)
- Born: Peter Schuyler Hobbs; January 19, 1918; Étretat, France
- Died: January 2, 2011 (aged 92); Santa Monica, California, U.S.
- Occupation: Actor
- Years active: 1948–1992
- Spouse(s): Parker McCormick Patience Cleveland (m. 1965; div. 1968) Carolyn Adams
- Children: 3

Peter Hobbs (January 19, 1918 – January 2, 2011) was a French-born American actor, known for roles on Broadway, television and film.

== Early life, education and military service ==
Hobbs was born in Étretat, France to Dr. Austin L. Hobbs and Mabel Foote Hobbs; however, he was raised in New York City. Hobbs attended Solebury School in Bucks County, Pennsylvania, and he received his bachelor's degree from Bard College in Annandale-on-Hudson, New York. He served as a sergeant in combat engineering during World War II and fought at the Battle of the Bulge.

== Career ==
Hobbs made two guest appearances on Perry Mason, including the role of defendant Gregory Pelham in the 1964 episode "The Case of the Careless Kidnapper" and the role of James Hyatt in the 1965 episode "The Case of the Cheating Chancellor." He also had appearances and recurring roles on Barney Miller, Lou Grant, The Odd Couple, The Doris Day Show, The Facts of Life, Knots Landing, The F.B.I., and The Tim Conway Show. Hobbs played Peter Ames on the daytime series The Secret Storm from 1954 to 1962.

His film credits included roles in The Girl Who Knew Too Much (1969), The Andromeda Strain (1971), The Steagle (1971), Sleeper (1973), The Lady in Red (1979), Loving Couples (1980), Any Which Way You Can (1980), Beyond Witch Mountain (1982), The Man with Two Brains (1983) and Nickel Mountain (1984).

Hobbs's Broadway credits included Under This Roof (1942), The Life of Reilly (1942), Comes the Revelation (1942), The Russian People (1942), Truckline Cafe (1946), Joan of Lorraine (1946}, and The Teahouse of the August Moon (1953).

== Personal life ==
Hobbs was married to actress Parker McCormick. He married American actress Patience Cleveland on October 24, 1965, in Los Angeles, California. The union ended in divorce in 1968.

== Death ==
Hobbs died at his home in Santa Monica, California, on January 2, 2011, at age 92, following a brief illness. He was survived by his wife Carolyn Adams Hobbs, three daughters, two stepsons, six grandchildren and two great-grandchildren.

== Filmography ==
- Lost Boundaries (1949) - Eddie Clark (uncredited)
- The Killers (1964) - Instructor
- The New Interns (1964) - Dr. Duane
- Good Neighbor Sam (1964) - Phil Reisner
- The F.B.I. (1966-1968, TV series)
- Daddy's Gone A-Hunting (1969) - Cathy's Doctor (uncredited)
- The Girl Who Knew Too Much (1969) - Robert Farwell
- The Andromeda Strain (1971) - General Sparks
- The Steagle (1971) - Dr. Payne
- Star Spangled Girl (1971) - Man in Car
- The Odd Couple - 4 episodes (1972-1975, TV series)
- Heavy Traffic (1973) - (voice)
- Sleeper (1973) - Dr. Dean
- The Nine Lives of Fritz the Cat (1974) - (voice)
- Death Sentence (1974) - Judge
- Mary Tyler Moore Show - 1 episode (1975, TV series) - Series 6, episode 4, "Murray in Love" - Bartender
- Wizards (1977) - General (voice)
- Barney Miller - 6 episodes (1977-1980, TV series)
- Lou Grant - 4 episodes (1977-1981, TV series)
- The Lady in Red (1979) - Pops Geissler
- The Two Worlds of Jennie Logan (1979)
- Diff'rent Strokes (1979-1985, TV series)
- Loving Couples (1980) - Frank
- Any Which Way You Can (1980) - Motel Clerk
- 9 to 5 (1980) - Doctor at St. Ambrose Hospital
- Knots Landing - 4 episodes (1981-1984, TV series)
- The Incredible Hulk (1981) - Dr. Hart
- Beyond Witch Mountain (1982) - Dr. Peter Morton
- Hart to Hart (1983, TV Series) as Ben Alden - season 4, episode 12
- The Man with Two Brains (1983) - Dr. Brandon
- The Dukes of Hazzard (1983) - Emerson P. Craig
- Nickel Mountain (1984) - Dr. Costard
- The Next One (1984) - Barnaby
- Hunter (1986, TV series) - season 2, episode 14
- In the Mood (1987) - The Judge
- Hot to Trot (1988) - Veterinarian
