= Return from Witch Mountain =

1978 film by John Hough

- Theatrical release poster
- Directed by: John Hough
- Written by: Malcolm Marmorstein
- Based on: Characters created by Alexander Key
- Produced by: Ron Miller; Jerome Courtland
- Starring: Bette Davis; Christopher Lee; Kim Richards; Ike Eisenmann; Jack Soo; Anthony James
- Cinematography: Frank V. Phillips
- Edited by: Bob Bring
- Music by: Lalo Schifrin
- Production company: Walt Disney Productions
- Distributed by: Buena Vista Distribution
- Release date: March 10, 1978
- Running time: 94 minutes
- Country: United States
- Language: English
- Box office: $16.3 million (worldwide)

Return from Witch Mountain is a 1978 American science fiction–adventure film and a sequel to Escape to Witch Mountain (1975) and the second film in the Witch Mountain franchise. It was produced by Walt Disney Productions. It was written by Malcolm Marmorstein and is based on characters created by Alexander Key, who also wrote the novelization of the film for Disney. Ike Eisenmann, Kim Richards, and Denver Pyle reprise their roles as Tony, Tia, and Uncle Bené—humanoid extraterrestrials with special powers including telepathy and telekinesis. The two main villains are played by Bette Davis as Letha Wedge, a greedy woman using the last of her money to finance the scientific experiments of Dr. Victor Gannon, played by Christopher Lee. It was the final film of actor Jack Soo, who died of cancer in January 1979.

The film was released on March 10, 1978. In September 1978, the film was re-released to theaters on a double bill with Escape to Witch Mountain.

A television film called Beyond Witch Mountain was made in 1982.

== Plot ==
Tony and his sister Tia need a vacation. Uncle Bené drops them off in their flying saucer at the Rose Bowl Stadium in Los Angeles, California, after which the siblings quickly become separated from each other. A man named Dr. Victor Gannon and his financial backer Letha Wedge witness Tony using his powers to save Letha's nephew Sickle from certain death. Realizing that Tony has supernatural powers, Dr. Gannon drugs the boy with a tranquilizer shot and takes him back to their laboratory. There, Dr. Gannon successfully tests a new mind-control technology on him. Under its influence, Tony is completely hypnotized and does everything his kidnappers want him to do, including stealing gold from a museum exhibit and stopping Tia from finding them. With Tony at his robotic bidding, Dr. Gannon hopes to achieve recognition within the scientific community and worldwide power, while Letha merely wants a return on her investment.

The Earthquake Gang, a group of would-be tough boys Tia meets, are being chased by a group of rivals; Tia telepathically gets rid of them. The boys accept her into their ranks and help her look for her brother. They let her sleep in their secret hideout, where she has visions of Tony's location.

Tia sees Tony at work with gold in a museum; he is controlled by a chip attached to his ear. To go to him, Tia convinces the Earthquake gang to "turn themselves in" to Mr. Yokomoto, the truant officer, who Tia informs about her brother. Yokomoto agrees that the brother should also go to school, so chases the doctor, aunt, nephew, and Tony in his minibus. While chasing them, Gannon has Tony try measures to elude the pursuer, and ultimately cause the minibus to go out of control. Tia and the gang hurry away to find Tony, leaving Mr. Yokomoto realizing he will lose his job for destroying public property.

Tony unstacks the gold for Letha, but her pushy desire for speed damages Letha's van.

Using her telepathy to find Tony, Tia discovers his captors' hideout but is caught by Sickle and placed in an anesthesia chamber by Gannon. Unable to move, Tia telepathically asks a goat to find the Earthquake Gang. The gang follows the goat back to the hideout and they free Tia as Tony, Letha, Sickle, and Victor drive to a plant to steal plutonium. Tia traces their location and describes it as a "big round ball". They come across Mr. Yokomoto, who tells them he lost his job and the only thing that works in the minibus is the radio. The news given about the plutonium plant stresses on the term "molecular flow".

Tia then asks Mr. Yokomoto to drive them to the location after she telekinetically repairs the minibus so it will at least run. After Victor and his gang reach the site, he shuts down the plant's cooling system. In exchange for turning it back on, he demands $5 million in cash (equivalent to $25 million in 2025), a jet to escape, and public acknowledgement of his achievements. The people working at the plant make arrangements for the money as soon as possible, but Tia reaches the site in time, where she and Tony battle to turn on the cooling system. Tia manages to turn it on, but Victor commands Tony to kill his sister. Tia realizes he is being controlled and destroys the device. Tony levitates Victor, Sickle and Letha to the ceiling with no way of getting down. Mr. Yokomoto drives the kids to the Rose Bowl Stadium and the Earthquake Gang come along to say goodbye. Tony and Tia restore the minibus to mint condition (so Mr. Yokomoto will not lose his job), convince the gang of the value of going to school, bid farewell to them, board the flying saucer and go back to Witch Mountain.

== Cast ==
- Bette Davis as Letha Wedge
- Christopher Lee as Dr. Victor Gannon
- Kim Richards as Tia Malone
- Ike Eisenmann as Tony Malone
- Jack Soo as Mr. "Yo-Yo" Yokomoto
- Anthony James as Sickle
- Richard Bakalyan as Eddie
- Ward Costello as Mr. Clearcole
- Christian Juttner as Dazzler
- Brad Savage as Muscles
- Poindexter Yothers as Crusher
- Jeffrey Jacquet as Rocky
- Stu Gilliam as Dolan
- William Bassett as Operations officer
- Tom Scott as Monitor
- Helene Winston as Dowager
- Albert Able as Engineer
- Denver Pyle as Uncle Bené
- Brian Part and Pierre Daniel as Goons
- Wally Brooks as Taxi fare
- Mel Gold as Security guard
- Bob Yothers as Cop
- Casse Jaeger as School patrolman
- Larry Mamorstein as Guard
- Bob James as Gate guard
- Ruth Warshawsky as Lady in car
- Adam Anderson as Man in museum
- Rosemary Lord as Woman in museum
- Ted Noose as Policeman
- Wally Berns as Man in car

== Production notes ==
Actors Kim Richards and Ike Eisenmann appear in at least four films together: this one; the original Disney film Escape to Witch Mountain (1975); the television film Devil Dog: The Hound of Hell (1978); and a reimagined remake of the original film Race to Witch Mountain (2009), released in March 2009 in which Richards portrays a roadside waitress and Eisenman a sheriff.

Jack Soo (Mr. "Yo-Yo" Yokomoto) was diagnosed with esophageal cancer in the autumn of 1978, several months after the film's release. Return from Witch Mountain would be his final film appearance, as he died the following January.

Poindexter "Crusher" Yothers is the real-life brother of singer-actress Tina Yothers, of Family Ties (1982-1989) fame. Their father Bob also appears in this film, as a policeman.

The emergency voice heard over Yokomoto's minibus radio—announcing the problem at the plutonium plant—is that of Gary Owens.

=== Filming locations ===
Filming started on April 11, 1977.

The otherwise vacant lot upon which the children's dilapidated mansion hideout stands was at the Alameda Street railroad yard in California, where the Rochester House (a relic from the 1880s) was waiting for restoration and relocation. The house was never restored and was ultimately demolished in 1979.

Scenes of Dr. Victor Gannon's mansion, the location of his laboratory, were filmed at Moby Castle on Durand Drive, Hollywood Hills, Los Angeles.

The tunnel scenes were filmed at the Fillmore and Western Railway in Fillmore, California constructing a faux tunnel structure. The faux tunnel still stands and can be seen from CA-126/Telegraph Road.

The gold bar robbery sequence was filmed at the Natural History Museum in Exposition Park, Los Angeles. The building facing the park's Rose Garden was used for exterior shots of the museum. The scene in which Yokomoto's minibus is overturned and breaks a fire hydrant was filmed near the Sunset Boulevard bridge and Glendale Boulevard underpass intersection, in the Echo Park district.

The film also shot at Wolf's Lair in Beachwood Canyon, Los Angeles.

== Novelization ==
Alexander Key wrote a novelization of Return from Witch Mountain, based on Malcolm Marmorstein's screenplay; the book was released by Westminster Press in 1978 to coincide with the film's theatrical release.

== Home video ==
Return from Witch Mountain was released on VHS in April 1986. It was first released as a Special Edition DVD in Region 1 on September 2, 2003, re-released on DVD in a two-movie collection along with Escape to Witch Mountain on September 5, 2006, and re-released as part of the Walt Disney Family Classics line on March 10, 2009.

Return from Witch Mountain was released via US only Blu-ray exclusively through the now closed Disney Movie Club exclusive title in October 30, 2015.

In the US, the film is available to stream on Disney+.
