= Banjo Hackett: Roamin' Free =

1976 TV film

- DVD cover
- Genre: Western
- Written by: Ken Trevey
- Directed by: Andrew V. McLaglen
- Starring: Don Meredith; Ike Eisenmann; Chuck Connors; Slim Pickens
- Music by: Morton Stevens
- Country of origin: United States
- Original language: English

Production
- Producer: Bruce Lansbury
- Cinematography: Al Francis
- Editors: Dann Cahn; David Wages
- Running time: 96 minutes
- Production company: Columbia Pictures Television

Original release
- Network: NBC
- Release: May 3, 1976

Banjo Hackett: Roamin' Free (also known as just Banjo Hackett) is a 1976 American Western television film directed by Andrew V. McLaglen, written by Ken Trevey, and starring Don Meredith, Ike Eisenmann and Chuck Connors. The film originally aired on May 3, 1976 on NBC and was a pilot for a possible series.

== Plot summary ==
Traveling the frontier in the 1880s, Banjo Hackett, a horse trader receives a letter from his ailing sister. After rushing to his sister's hometown, he finds that his sister has recently died and her nine-year-old son Jubal Winner has already been sent to the local orphanage. Banjo helps the boy escape and takes him along to find Dido's Lament, the boy's mare, a gift from Uncle Banjo. The race is on to recover Dido and the foal the horse is carrying before bounty hunter Sam Ivory does.

== Main cast ==
- Don Meredith as Banjo Hackett
- Ike Eisenmann as Jubal Winner
- Chuck Connors as Sam Ivory
- Slim Pickens as Lijah Tuttle
- Jennifer Warren as Mollie Brannen
- Gloria DeHaven as Lady Jane Gray
- L. Q. Jones as Sheriff Tadlock
- Jeff Corey as Judge Janeway
- Anne Francis as Flora Dobbs
- Albert Able as Rudolf, The Bettor

== Home media ==
The title was released on DVD by Sony Pictures. However, as of 2021, the film has not been released on Blu-ray or in the digital format.
