= The Sky's the Limit (1975 film) =

1975 Disney film by Tom Leetch

- DVD cover
- Based on: Story by Larry Lenville
- Written by: Harry Spalding
- Directed by: Tom Leetch
- Starring: Pat O’Brien; Ike Eisenmann; Lloyd Nolan
- Music by: George Dunning
- Country of origin: United States
- Original language: English

Production
- Producer: Ron Miller
- Cinematography: Andrew Jackson
- Editor: Bob Bring
- Running time: 89 minutes
- Production company: Walt Disney Productions

Original release
- Network: NBC
- Release: January 19 – January 26, 1975

The Sky's the Limit is a 1975 American made-for-television adventure film directed by Tom Leetch, starring Pat O’Brien, Ike Eisenmann and Lloyd Nolan. It was produced by Walt Disney Productions and based on the story by Larry Lenville. The film was originally aired as a two-part episode on The Wonderful World of Disney on January 19 and 26, 1975 on NBC.

== Plot ==
A boy known as Three, off from school for the summer, reluctantly goes to spend the time on his grandfather's farm. The rural life with his grandfather, Abner and his only farm hand Cornwall is hard for Three to adjust to. This includes a goose that picks on him and an attempt to drive a tractor that goes wrong. However, things change when Three discovers a World War I biplane in the barn and that his grandfather was a flying ace during that war. Three convinces Abner to fix the plane and teach him how to fly.

== Cast ==
- Pat O’Brien as Abner Therman
- Ike Eisenmann as Three
- Lloyd Nolan as Cornwall
- Jeanette Nolan as Gertie
- Robert Sampson as Two
- Alan Hale Jr. as Cholly
- Richard Arlen as Grimes
- Ben Blue as Ben
- Huntz Hall as hitchhiker

== Home media ==
The title has been released on VHS and DVD.
