= William H. Bassett =

American actor of film and television (1935–2025)

- Bassett as Prince Charming in Bewitched
- Born: William Henry Bassett; December 28, 1935; Evanston, Illinois, U.S.
- Died: February 9, 2025 (aged 89); Los Angeles, California, U.S.
- Occupation: Actor
- Years active: 1960–2021

William Henry Bassett (December 28, 1935 – February 9, 2025) was an American actor of film and television who appeared in more than 100 films and television programs from the 1960s.

== Life and career ==
Bassett was known for his role in ads for Whataburger. He also appeared in films such as Lucky Lady, Old Boyfriends, Return from Witch Mountain, The Karate Kid, Black Eagle, House of 1000 Corpses, Demon Hunter and Black Dynamite, as well as such television shows as Bewitched; I Dream of Jeannie; Bonanza; The Feather and Father Gang; The Love Boat; Days of Our Lives; Quincy, M.E.; Lou Grant; Dallas; The Young and the Restless; Newhart; General Hospital; Sabrina The Teenage Witch; 3rd Rock from the Sun; Scrubs; The Streets of San Francisco; and Arrested Development. Bassett's work as a voice actor includes the video games Metal Gear Solid, Warcraft 3: The Frozen Throne, Fallout 3, Star Wars: The Old Republic, Final Fantasy Type-0 HD and World of Final Fantasy, along with being the narrator for the documentary Inside: Dr. Strangelove or How I Learned to Stop Worrying and Love the Bomb.

Bassett also hosted the trivia game show Inquizition throughout its 1998 to 2001 run on the Game Show Network. The caustic "Inquizitor" was always filmed from behind, his face unseen and identity unknown. Bassett was finally revealed as the show's host in a 2024 interview with creator Sande Stewart.

Bassett died on February 9, 2025, at the age of 89.

== Filmography ==
=== Anime ===
Year	Title	Role	Notes
1979	Lupin the Third: Castle of Cagliostro	Counterfeiter / Whispering Councilman	Credited as Fred Bloggs
1988	Akira	Additional Voices	
1992	Mobile Suit Gundam 0083: Stardust Memory	Yuri Hussler	Episode: "A Storm Raging Through"; credited as Fred Bloggs
1995	Catnapped! The Movie	Magician	Credited as Fred Bloggs
1999	Cowboy Bebop	Frog	Episode: "Mushroom Samba"; credited as Fred Bloggs
2000	Ah! My Goddess: The Movie	Additional Voices	Credited as Fred Bloggs
2003–2005	Ghost in the Shell: Stand Alone Complex	Chief Cabinet Secretary Takakura / Uno / Director	4 episodes; credited as Bill Basset
2004	Appleseed	Elder	Credited as Frederick Bloggs
2008	Metal Gear Solid: Digital Graphic Novel	Jim Houseman	

=== Film ===
Year	Title	Role	Notes
1969	A Time for Dying	The Southerner	
1970	The Grasshopper	Aaron	Credited as William H. Bassett
1972	Conquest of the Planet of the Apes	Mr. Pine	Uncredited
1972	1776	Thomas Heyward Jr.	Uncredited
1974	The Towering Inferno	Leasing Agent	Credited as William H. Bassett
1975	Lucky Lady	Charley	
1978	Return from Witch Mountain	Operations Officer	Credited as William H. Bassett
1979	Old Boyfriends	David Brinks	
1979	Shadow of Fear	The Doctor	
1984	The Karate Kid	Mr. Mills	
1984	Sam's Son	Mr. Turner	Credited as William H. Bassett
1985	Creator	Dr. Sutter	Credited as William H. Bassett
1986	The Naked Cage	Jordan	
1986	Invaders from Mars	NASA Scientist	
1988	Black Eagle	Dean Rickert	
1990	Angel Town	Graduate Dean	
1993	Ring of Fire II: Blood and Steel	Aaron	
2001	Soulkeeper	Old Bum	
2001	Night Class	Holden	Credited as William H. Bassett
2001	The Man with No Eyes	Cleetus	Short film
2002	Crazy as Hell	Mr. Brennan	
2003	House of 1000 Corpses	Sheriff Frank Huston	Credited as William H. Bassett
2004	Wild Roomies	Mr. Seeley	
2005	Welcome to September	Mr. Taskey	
2005	Demon Hunter	Cardinal White	
2008	Fast Girl	Willy	
2009	Black Dynamite	Captain Yancy	
2018	Blood Type	Santa Soup Bum	

=== Television ===
Year	Title	Role	Notes
1960	The Tempest	Ferdinand	Television film; credited as William H. Bassett
1960	The Chevy Mystery Show	Dr. Roger Waring	Episode: "Dark Possession"; credited as W.H. Bassett
1966	The Journey of the Fifth Horse	Rubin / Narvinsky	Television film; credited as William H. Bassett
1967	The Wild Wild West	Lt. Carter	Episode: "The Night of the Arrow"; credited as William H. Bassett
1968	Bewitched	Prince Charming / Cousin Charlie	Episode: "Prince of a Guy"
1968	The Second Hundred Years	Sergei	Episode: "Luke and Comrade Tanya"
1968–1969	I Dream of Jeannie	Sam Farrow / Clem	2 episodes
1968–1971	Insight	Roman	2 episodes
1968–1988	Days of Our Lives	Dr. Walter Griffin / Government Official / Det. Weston / Jerry Barnes / Scott Blake	19 episodes; credited as William H. Bassett
1969	Here Come the Brides	Willard	2 episodes; credited as William H. Bassett
1969	The Outcasts	Travers	Episode: "The Long Ride"
1969	Land of the Giants	Ranger Jack	Episode: "Home Sweet Home"
1970	Mannix	Warren Hoxie	Episode: "Medal for a Hero"; credited as William H. Bassett
1970	Bonanza	Jed Walker	Episode: "Decision at Los Robles"
1970	Nancy	Secret Service Agent Turner	4 episodes
1972	Cade's County	Howard Tanner	Episode: "The Fake"
1972	Another Part of the Forest	Bagtry	TV adaptation of the play by Lillian Hellman
1972	Mod Squad	Gordon Calder	Episode: "Kristie"
1973	Search	Donald	Episode: "Ends of the Earth"; credited as William H. Bassett
1973	The Young and the Restless	Pete Walker	
1973	The Man of Destiny	The Sub-Lieutenant	Television film
1973	Police Story	Psychologist	Episode: "Man on a Rack"
1974	Unwed Father	Principal	Television film
1974	The Wild World of Mystery	The Collector	Episode: "The Cloning of Clifford Swimmer"
1974	The Streets of San Francisco	Donald Bateman	Episode: "The Twenty-Five Caliber Plague"; credited as William H. Bassett
1974	Harry O	Red Kramer	Episode: "Forty Reasons to Kill: Part 2"; credited as William H. Bassett
1974	The Rookies	Walden	Episode: "Take Over"; credited as William H. Bassett
1975	My Father's House	Airplane Captain	Television film
1975	Shazam!	Bill Ritzi	Episode: "Double Trouble"
1976	The Love Boat	The First Officer	Pilot episode - television film
1976	Francis Gary Powers: The True Story of the U-2 Spy Incident		Television film
1976	Wonderbug		Episode: "The Maltese Gooneybird"
1976	Once and Eagle		4 episodes
1976–1977	The Feather and Father Gang	Huffaker	2 episodes; credited as William H. Bassett
1977	ABC Afterschool Special	Father	Episode: "Very Good Friends"
1977	The Love Boat	Josh	Episode: "The New Love Boat - The Newlyweds/The Exchange/Cleo's First Voyage"
1977	Never Con a Killer	Huff Hufaker	Television film; credited as William H. Bassett
1977	The Night They Took Miss Beautiful	Smitty	Television film
1978	Perfect Gentlemen	Southern Man	Television film
1978	Keefer	The Sergeant	Television film
1978	The Bastard	British Officer	Credited as William H. Bassett
1979	Quincy, M.E.	Harris	Episode: "By the Death of a Child"; credited as William H. Bassett
1979	Lou Grant	Alexander Crosley	Episode: "Charlatan"; credited as William H. Bassett
1979–1982	The Magical World of Disney	Doctor / Lowell Roberts / Policeman	4 episodes; credited as William H. Bassett
1979–1988	Dallas	Attorney Gurney / Dr. Paul Hollister	6 episodes; credited as William H. Bassett
1980	The Kids Who Knew Too Much	Policeman	Television film
1981	Thornwell	CIC Agent	Television film; credited as William H. Bassett
1981	Flamingo Road		Episode: "Bad Chemistry"; credited as William H. Bassett
1982	The Fall Guy	Clark	Episode: "The Adventures of Ozzie and Harold"; credited as William H. Bassett
1982	Moonlight	Tappan Zee Man	Television film; credited as William H. Bassett
1982	Beyond Witch Mountain	Lowell Roberts	
1983	Hart to Hart	Jeff Brogen	Episode: "Trust Your Hart"; credited as William H. Bassett
1984	Knots Landing	Emissary	Episode: "Negotiations"; credited as William H. Bassett
1984	Rituals	Phillip Mason #1	3 episodes
1984	Jessie	Mr. Shepard	Episode: "Trick of Fate"
1985	Cover Up	Dr. Stevens	Episode: "Murder Offshore"
1985	Hunter	Park Bench Bum	Episode: "Guilty"; credited as William H. Bassett
1985	Hotel	Reese	Episode: "Rallying Cry"
1986	Newhart	Male Guest	Episode: "The Stratford Horror Picture Show"; credited as William H. Bassett
1986	T.J. Hooker	Mr. Miller	Episode: "Deadly Force"; credited as William H. Bassett
1987	General Hospital	Wolfgang Von Schuler	5 episodes; credited as William H. Bassett
1987	Dynasty	R.D. Fleming	Episode: "The Spoiler"
1989	The Case of the Hillside Stranglers	Dr. Watts	Television film; credited as William H. Bassett
1989	The Hollywood Detective	Jerry Brazil	Television film; credited as William H. Bassett
1990	Mancuso, FBI		Episode: "Night of the Living Shred"; credited as William H. Bassett
1990	The New Lassie	Arthur Reynolds	Episode: "Watch Your Step"
1991	Never Forget	Lewis Brandon	Television film
1994	Spring Awakening	Ulf Anderson	Television film
1995	OP Center	Academic #4	
1996	Her Costly Affair	Ed Baines	Television film
1997	A Match Made in Heaven	Sam Landry	Television film
1998	The Magnificent Seven	Bartender	Episode: "Working Girls"
1998-2001	Inquizition	The Inquizitor (host, uncredited)	
1999	Sabrina the Teenage Witch	Uncle Roy	Episode: "The Long and Winding Short Cut"; credited as William H. Bassett
1999	3rd Rock from the Sun	Bernard	Episode: "Dick v. Strudwick"; credited as William H. Bassett
1999	Dharma & Greg	Dewey	Episode: "Tie-Dying the Knot"; credited as William H. Bassett
1999	Power Rangers Lost Galaxy	Ghost Commander	Episode: "Beware the Mutiny"; credited as William H. Bassett
2000	Beyond Belief: Fact or Fiction	Alexander	Episode: "The Burial"
2000	The Invisible Man	Benjamin Scarborough	Episode: "Tiresias"; credited as William H. Bassett
2001	The Division	Older Man	Episode: "The First Hit's Free, Baby"; credited as William H. Bassett
2003	Strong Medicine	Spelling Bee Judge	Episode: "Seize the Day"
2004	Scrubs	Patient	Episode: "My Last Chance"; credited as William H. Bassett
2005	Carnivàle	Dr. Delichter	Episode: "Damascus, NE"; credited as William H. Bassett
2005	Reno 911!	Mover	Episode: "Clemmy Marries a Dead Guy"; credited as William H. Bassett
2005	Arrested Development	Cab Driver	Episode: "The Cabin Show"; credited as William H. Bassett
2006	Avatar: The Last Airbender	Swampmonster / Huu	Voice, 2 episodes; credited as William H. Bassett

=== Video games ===
Year	Title	Role	Notes
1998	Metal Gear Solid	Jim Houseman	English version; credited as Frederick Bloggs
2000	Diablo II	Ormus	Credited as Frederick Bloggs
2002	Medal of Honor: Allied Assault	Additional Voices	
2002	Warcraft III: Reign of Chaos	Antonidas / Cairne Bloodhoof	Credited as Frederick Bloggs
2002	Neverwinter Nights	Saer Bodkin / Vale Reyer	Uncredited
2003	Warcraft III: The Frozen Throne	Cairne Bloodhoof	Credited as Frederick Bloggs
2004	Metal Gear Solid: The Twin Snakes	Jim Houseman	Credited as William H. Bassett
2007	Avatar: The Last Airbender - The Burning Earth	Additional Voices	Credited as William H. Bassett
2008	Fallout 3	Elder Owyn Lyons	
2009	Fallout 3: Broken Steel	Elder Owyn Lyons	
2011	Star Wars: The Old Republic	Additional Voices	
2014	Hearthstone: Heroes of WarCraft	Archmage Antonidas / Cairne Bloodhoof	
2015	Final Fantasy Type-0 HD	Khalia	English version; credited as William H. Bassett
2016	World of Final Fantasy	Ramuh	English version; credited as William H. Bassett
2018	Fallout 76	Settler Forager - Wastelanders DLC	
