= The Incredible Tide =

1970 novel by Alexander Key

- First edition cover
- Author: Alexander Key
- Language: English
- Genre: Science fiction
- Publisher: Westminster Press
- Publication date: 1970
- Publication place: United States
- Media type: Print (hardback & paperback)
- Pages: 159
- ISBN: 0-664-32470-3
- OCLC: 70517
- LC Class: PZ7.K51 In

The Incredible Tide is a post-apocalyptic science fiction novel for young adults written by Alexander Key, published in 1970. It was the source material for the 1978 Japanese anime television series Future Boy Conan, directed by Hayao Miyazaki.

== Overview ==
The Incredible Tide tells the story of Conan, a boy who lives alone on a small island on Earth ravaged by World War III. The world was knocked off its axis and the continents have sunk into the ocean, with only small islets remaining. Conan is rescued but finds that the new society is very different from the world he knew before.

== Backstory ==
=== The West ===
Conan, Lanna and Teacher are survivors of a land called the West, or the Western World, that now no longer exists, as a result of the cataclysmic destruction caused by the war. The West is described as having been a generally peaceful place.

=== The Peace Union ===
Although the reasons behind the war are not clear, a global superpower known as the Peace Union waged war against the West, finally using a doomsday weapon that destroyed their enemies, but destroyed themselves as well. The Peace Union does not exist anymore, but its leftover artifacts are everywhere.

=== The Change ===
The doomsday weapon that the Peace Union used was magnetic in nature and caused a disruption in the Earth's core, causing massive worldwide earthquakes that changed the shape of land and sea alike. Huge tsunamis inundated all the world's coastlines; this was the "incredible tide" mentioned in the book's title. People now refer to this time as the Change.

=== The New Order ===
A group of people have recolonized a surviving Peace Union city, which they call Industria, and call themselves the New Order. They are trying to unite the survivors of the world under their banner and recreate the former civilization's technological glory. Of course, they consider themselves to be doing everyone a favor and expect everyone to be grateful or be subject to punishment.

=== High Harbor ===
The Western survivors make their way to an island and create High Harbor.

== Characters ==
=== Conan ===
Once Conan of Orme, a place in the West that no longer exists, Conan is 17 years old when the story begins. The incredible tide of the title caused the fleeing helicopter he was in to crash on its way to the island refuge that would become High Harbor, marooning him on a tiny island as the sole survivor, where he learned to survive on his own and has been living for five years. As a result of the hardship he has grown very strong.

=== Lanna ===
Lanna is described as a small, birdlike girl, and indeed she has several friends who are birds, including a tern named Tikki. She seems to have an empathic connection with birds that lets her communicate with them on a rudimentary level. She is a friend of Conan's who hasn't seen him since the cataclysm. Mazal is her aunt, Shann is her uncle, and Teacher is her grandfather. She has a deep-seated fear of the ocean since the tsunamis swept across the world.

=== Teacher ===
Teacher is a lean old man with a white beard and a mass of thick white hair who knows Conan and is the grandfather of Lanna. He is very wise, to the point of knowing how to communicate telepathically with Conan and Lanna's aunt Mazal over great distances. His real name is Briac Roa, and he is in hiding because the leaders of the New Order want to find him and use his knowledge to recreate the technology that the old world used to have.

=== Mazal and Shann ===
Lanna's Aunt and Uncle, they are the leaders of High Harbor. Mazal is Teacher's daughter and periodically receives telepathic messages from him, although she can't always make contact. She is also Lenna's mother's sister. Shann is a doctor and husband of Mazal..

=== Citizen Doctor Manski ===
A researcher who serves on a New Order exploration team, charting islands and searching for Briac Roa, Doctor Manski is totally committed to the New Order cause. She hates Westerners because a Westerner killed her son in the war, and thus she hates Conan too—but she is so dedicated to the New Order that she wants to make sure his youth and strength are put to work for the New Order.

=== Commissioner Dyce ===
Dyce is a trader from the New Order, but he is more than that; he is also an agent of the New Order. He has come to High Harbor to take anything he can get his hands on that might help the New Order, and he is frustrated whenever he demands something that isn't in the trade agreements and Shann denies him.

=== Orlo ===
A rebellious teenager at High Harbor who has decided to break away from the rule of Mazal, Shann, and Teacher, and has begun drawing more teenagers and children to his cause. Unfortunately the rebellion seems to be mostly for rebellion's sake—he's willing to steal food and even deal with the New Order to preserve his autonomy.

== Plot ==
The story alternates between the experiences of Conan and Lanna. A New Order ship discovers the island where Conan has been surviving for five years since the helicopter crash and captures him, taking him back to the city of Industria as a worker. Meanwhile, Lanna and her parents at High Harbor have to deal with Dyce, who wants her people to supply lumber faster than they can with the tools they have and is desperate for knowledge of the whereabouts of Briac Roa.

The New Order seems to be resurrecting only the worst of the fallen civilization's qualities, putting together a military-industrial complex without a culture or conscience. Without telling him what it will mean, they mark his forehead with a tattoo that designates him as an "apprentice citizen," meaning that he will have to work to pay off the "debt" that he owes in gratitude for having "rescued" him. Enraged, he seizes the tattooing device and marks several self-important officials before he is subdued, and they assign him to work for a crazy old man named Patch, who turns out to be Teacher. Teacher has been hiding in Industria since the cataclysm, since it is the last place where the New Order would ever look for him, hiding his identity by acting like an insane, crippled old man.

At High Harbor, Lanna and her parents are continuing to deal with Dyce and his demands—now he wants some wrecked aircraft that are on the island and some sassafras roots. Teacher has said that the New Order should by no means have those aircraft or the roots (the trees haven't yet multiplied to populations where there are enough to trade). Lanna finds out that they also have to deal with Orlo, who has been leading a rebellious tribe of children and teenagers that has broken away from the rest of High Harbor.

Teacher, in the guise of Patch, is still an apprentice citizen despite having been in Industria for years, because he likes where he is: in a boat shop, building boats. No one else in Industria knows how to build them—the city wasn't even on the coast before the Change. But Teacher has been planning to leave, and now that Conan is here, Teacher can put those plans into motion.

Sickness breaks out at High Harbor, and Dyce is the only one who has any medicines. Lanna discovers that not only is Orlo trying to take over High Harbor, he's making deals with Dyce. Teacher discovers that there's going to be another earthquake, and this one will drop half of what remains of Industria into the sea. His humanitarian nature forces him to go to the council and tell them who he really is so he can warn them, but he wants Conan to take the boat he's been building and wait for him at a designated rendezvous point.

Meanwhile, a child has died from the illness at High Harbor, and Shann and Mazal agree to let Dyce have the aircraft in exchange for the medicine they need, although Shann thinks Dyce deliberately started the sickness as a bargaining chip.

Conan waits for Teacher, but Teacher doesn't come. Realizing that Teacher is in trouble, he returns to Industria and rescues him, and they set sail for High Harbor, hoping that the searchers from Industria don't find them. They run deliberately into a storm as the only way to escape pursuit, but Teacher nearly drowns. Conan manages to get them to the island where he had survived for five years, and with Teacher's help he modifies their ship for the voyage to High Harbor—but they will have to hurry, because they know that with the coming earthquake will also come a tsunami. To their surprise, they discover that Dr. Manski has also washed up on this island, because her survey ship was ordered to search for Briac Roa and went down in the same storm. They can't just leave her there with a tsunami on the way, and she has no choice but to go with them, but she still can't believe that he is Briac Roa or that such things as telepathy—or God—exist.

Lanna despairs when Dyce entices more and more of the High Harbor people onto his trading vessel to show them the goods he has to trade—things that people don't need but that he can entice them into believing they want. She wishes she could see the ship for herself, because it might give her a better idea what to do, but she doesn't dare go there for fear of looking as if she were herself endorsing Dyce and his goods. So she tries something that has worked for her in the past; she sends her tern Tikki to fly over the ship and attempts to see through his eyes. But this fails. Instead, she climbs to the highest point on the island and tells Tikki to find Conan and bring him safely to High Harbor.

Teacher tells Dr. Manski about how Dyce had traded for the flying machines and their power cells for medicine to stop the sickness that had killed one child at High Harbor, and how he may in fact have spread the sickness in the first place. Manski thinks he's lying, because she doesn't trust how he gets his information and because he's an enemy of the New Order. But she begins to believe that he really is Briac Roa. Tikki makes it to their ship, but the fog has closed in, and they can't follow him because they can't see what direction he flies in.

Lanna and her parents learn that Orlo and Dyce have a plan to take over their house and move in, throwing Shann and Mazal out but keeping Lanna around, presumably as a plaything for Orlo. They resolve that this will not happen without a fight and arm themselves. Teacher has warned Mazal about the coming tsunami, and she has warned Dyce to take his ship out to sea, but he doesn't believe her. Lanna tries once more to put her psyche into Tikki and help him lead Conan and Teacher home, and this time she succeeds.

Conan, Teacher and Dr. Manski arrive at High Harbor right in the middle of the strife. Orlo and Dyce's faction immediately moves to seize Conan and Teacher, but Conan fights back and tells them to take shelter because there's a tsunami coming. Neither Dyce nor Orlo believe either Conan or Dr. Manski. Orlo captures Lanna, but lets her go when Conan challenges him directly, and Conan easily defeats him, awing his followers. Conan then uses the situation to get them all to seek higher ground, carrying the semi-conscious Orlo himself as the tsunami waters start to rush in. The story ends rather abruptly as it appears they will all make it to safety by working together.

== Influence on Hayao Miyazaki ==
In 1978 Hayao Miyazaki directed a 26-episode series called Future Boy Conan, based on The Incredible Tide. The themes of living sustainably in harmony with nature rather than coercing it with technology, and of villains trying to recover the technology that nearly destroyed the world in the past, both recurred strongly in the first full-length film Miyazaki later wrote and directed, Nausicaä of the Valley of the Wind (1984), and in the 1982-1994 manga of the same name by Miyazaki on which he partly based his film. (Note: This novel was translated into Japanese by Chikashi Uchida and published in 1974 under the title Japanese: "残された人々", romanized: "Nokosareta Hitobito", lit. '"The People Left Behind"' by Iwanami Shoten.) The idea of the world being covered in water made its way into the third act of Ponyo. Miyazaki's interpretation of Lana would serve as a prototype for Sheeta from Castle in the Sky.

== Availability ==
While the actual book has long been out-of-print, it became available again in digital form by Open Road Integrated Media in 2014.
