= Ike Eisenmann =

American actor

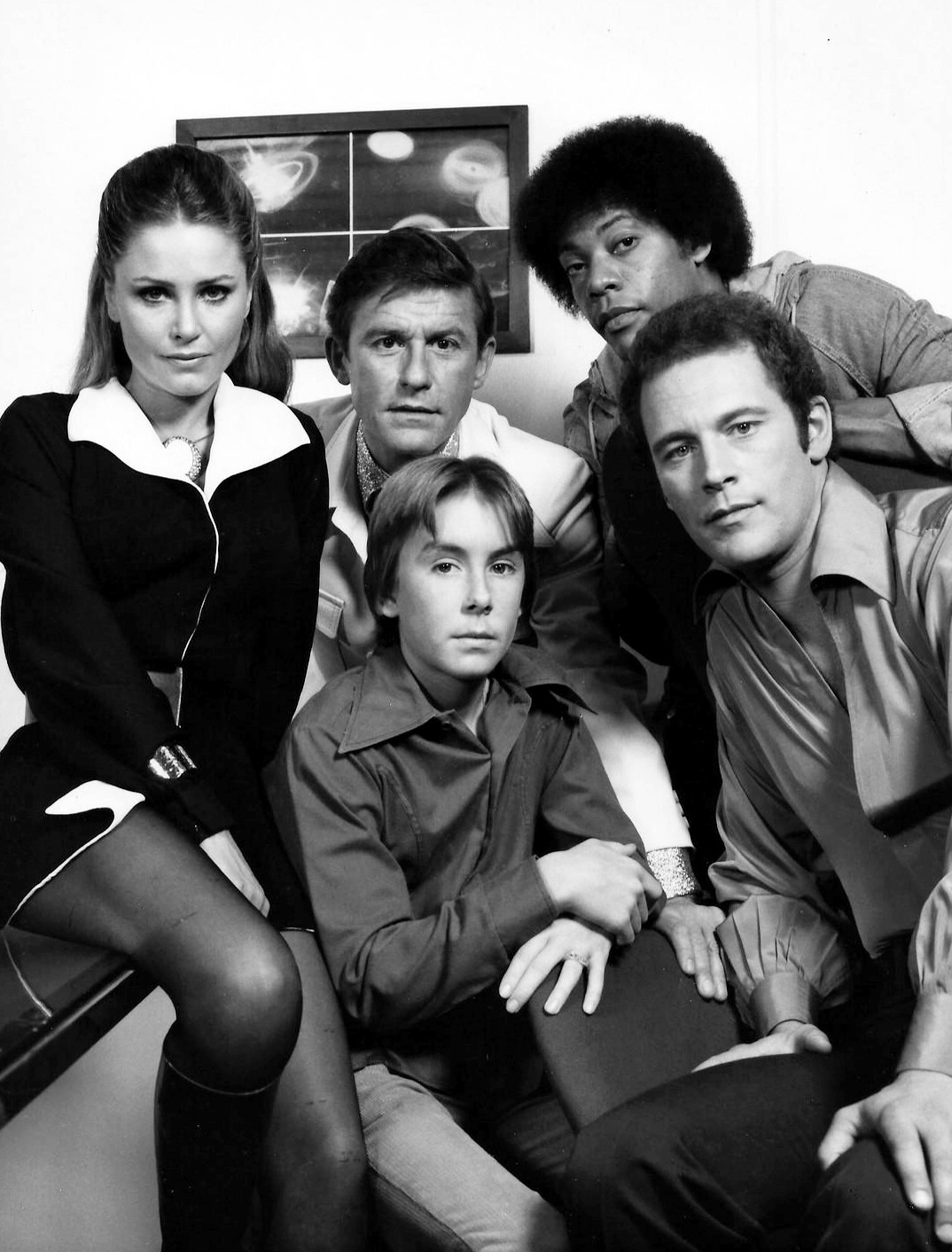
- Cast of TV's The Fantastic Journey. Back row, L-R: Katie Saylor, Roddy McDowall, Carl Franklin. Front: Ike Eisenmann and Jared Martin
- Born: Ike Eisenmann; July 21, 1962 (age 64); Tegucigalpa, Honduras.
- Occupations: Actor; producer; sound effects specialist; digital animator
- Years active: 1972–2009

Ike Eisenmann (born July 21, 1962) is a former American actor, producer, and sound effects specialist who has been active in the entertainment industry since childhood.

== Early life and education ==
Eisenmann was born in Tegucigalpa, Honduras while his family was living in that city and his father was working at the U.S. Embassy in Honduras , and raised in Houston, Texas. the son of Ruth Ann (née Gumney) and Albert Able Eisenmann Sr., an actor who appeared as "Cadet Don" on an eponymous children's television show that aired on KTRK (Channel 13) in Houston from 1959 to 1968. Ike's younger brother, Albert Able "Al" Eisenmann Jr., is also an actor, as are Al's son Stone and his sister Hannah.

== Career ==
Appearing on TV shows in the early 1970s, Ike Eisenmann first came to prominence as Tony, the brother of Tia (Kim Richards), in Walt Disney Productions' film Escape to Witch Mountain (1975) and its sequel, Return from Witch Mountain (1978). For Green Giant commercials in the 1970s and 1980s, he voiced the Little Green Sprout. He also appeared in Star Trek II: The Wrath of Khan (1982) as engineering cadet Peter Preston, Chief Engineer Montgomery Scott's nephew.

Eisenmann starred in the NBC TV series The Fantastic Journey, and made appearances in other series including CHiPs, Emergency!, T. J. Hooker, The Jeffersons, Wonder Woman, Kung Fu, Mannix, Little House on the Prairie, Police Woman, several episodes of Gunsmoke, and several appearances on the ABC Afterschool Special. He also appeared in the TV movies Devil Dog: The Hound of Hell and Terror Out of the Sky in 1978. Eisenmann starred in the made-for-television 1982 movie Dreams Don't Die as New York subway graffiti artist Danny Baker, who tries to publish his art professionally. Though not a critical success, the film enjoyed cult status during late night rebroadcasts.

Eisenmann continued to appear in minor television roles as a teen, such as on the sitcom The Jeffersons. He also appeared in the 1978 mini-series The Bastard as the Marquis de LaFayette. His other film roles included The Formula (1980) opposite Marlon Brando and George C. Scott, Cross Creek (1983) directed by Martin Ritt, and Disney's Tom and Huck (1995) in a minor role.

=== Most recent work ===
After the mid 1980s, Eisenmann's career was in post-production, sometimes going under the alternative spelling of his name, Iake Eissinmann, working as a loop group actor, on movies such as American Beauty, What Lies Beneath, Meet the Parents, Madagascar, and the Shrek series. In 2002, he directed and appeared in a 12-minute short film, the spoof The Blair Witch Mountain Project.

The 2009 Witch Mountain remake, Race to Witch Mountain, features Eisenmann in a cameo along with his original co-star Kim Richards. Richards and Eisenmann appear in a scene together as a waitress and a sheriff, respectively.

== Filmography ==
- Green Giant (1972–1989, commercial)
- The Magical Mystery Trip Through Little Red's Head (1974) – Larry
- The Sky's the Limit (1975) – Three
- The Secret of the Pond (1975) – Odie White
- Escape to Witch Mountain (1975) – Tony Malone
- The Kansas City Massacre (1975, TV movie) – Jimmie Floyd
- The Amazing Cosmic Awareness of Duffy Moon (1976, ABC Afterschool Special) – Duffy Moon
- Banjo Hackett: Roamin' Free (1976, TV movie) – Jubal Winner
- The Fantastic Journey (1977, TV series) – Scott Jordan
- Kit Carson and the Mountain Men (1977, TV movie) – Randy Benton
- Police Woman (1977, TV series) episode "Deadline: Death" - Jeff Forester
- Return from Witch Mountain (1978) – Tony
- The Bastard (1978, TV miniseries) – The Marquis de LaFayette
- Devil Dog: The Hound of Hell (1978, TV movie) – Charlie Barry
- Terror Out of the Sky (1978, TV movie) – Eric Mangus
- CHiPs (1978, TV series) episode "High Explosive" – Barry Lasher
- The Shadow of Fear (1979) - Billy Stewart
- Can You Feel It (1979) – The Jacksons
- The Formula (1980) – Tony
- The Jeffersons (1981, TV series) episode "Sorry, Wrong Meeting" – Dwayne Purcell
- Dreams Don't Die (1982, TV movie) – Danny Baker
- Star Trek II: The Wrath of Khan (1982) – Midshipman Peter Preston
- Cross Creek (1983) – Paul
- Nausicaä of the Valley of the Wind (1984) (English version, voice)
- GoBots: Battle of the Rock Lords (1986) – Nick Burns (voice)
- Some Kind of Wonderful (1987) – Party Guest
- Angel of Fury (1992) – (voice)
- Pom Poko (1994) (English version, voice)
- Tom and Huck (1995) – Taverner
- The Blair Witch Mountain Project (2002) – Tony
- Howl's Moving Castle (2004) (English version, voice)
- Race to Witch Mountain (2009) – Sheriff Anthony

== Bibliography ==
- Holmstrom, John. The Moving Picture Boy: An International Encyclopaedia from 1895 to 1995. Norwich, Michael Russell, 1996, p. 340.
