= Witchcraft (game) =

Witchcraft is a fantasy-themed Polish board game for two players designed by Michał Oracz and Ignacy Trzewiczek and published by Portal Games.

== Reception ==
- Gamesfanatic
- Polter
- Rebel Times #15
- Świat Gier Planszowych #8
