= Race to Witch Mountain =

2009 American science fiction action adventure film

- Theatrical release poster
- Directed by: Andy Fickman
- Screenplay by: Matt Lopez; Mark Bomback
- Story by: Matt Lopez
- Based on: Escape to Witch Mountain by Alexander Key
- Produced by: Andrew Gunn
- Starring: Dwayne Johnson; AnnaSophia Robb; Carla Gugino; Ciarán Hinds; Alexander Ludwig; Tom Everett Scott; Christopher Marquette
- Cinematography: Greg Gardiner
- Edited by: David Rennie
- Music by: Trevor Rabin
- Production companies: Walt Disney Pictures; Gunn Films
- Distributed by: Walt Disney Studios; Motion Pictures
- Release dates: March 11, 2009 (Egypt); March 13, 2009 (United States)
- Running time: 98 minutes
- Country: United States
- Language: English
- Budget: $50 million
- Box office: $106.4 million

Race to Witch Mountain is a 2009 American science fiction action adventure film directed by Andy Fickman. The film stars Dwayne Johnson alongside AnnaSophia Robb, Carla Gugino, Ciarán Hinds, Alexander Ludwig, Tom Everett Scott, and Christopher Marquette. A reboot of the Witch Mountain franchise, the plot revolves around Jack Bruno, a Las Vegas taxi driver, who must get extraterrestrials Seth and Sara to their spaceship on Witch Mountain before an assassin and several government agents can catch up to them.

Race to Witch Mountain was theatrically released on March 13, 2009, in the United States, through Walt Disney Studios Motion Pictures. Despite receiving mixed reviews from critics, the film was a modest box-office success, grossing $106.4 million worldwide against a production budget of $50 million.

== Plot ==
An alien spacecraft crashes near Searchlight, Nevada, 45 miles from Las Vegas. Project Moon Dust, a secret Defense Department unit led by Henry Burke, arrives in black helicopters, seizes the spacecraft and searches for its passengers to exploit their DNA and powers.

In Las Vegas, former mob getaway driver Jack Bruno works as a taxi cab driver to avoid returning to prison. One passenger is failed astrophysicist Dr. Alex Friedman, who is visiting the city to speak at a UFO convention at the Planet Hollywood hotel. After Bruno fends off two thugs working for mob boss Andrew Wolfe, two teenagers, Sara and Seth, enter his cab and offer $15,000 to be driven to an undisclosed destination.

Burke's agents track the teenagers through a series of clues, eventually locating them in Bruno's taxi. Believing the agents to be more mob enforcers, Bruno attempts to escape. Seth can vary his molecular density, while Sara possesses telepathy and telekinesis, enabling the group to evade their pursuers.

At an abandoned house, Bruno follows them and discovers that the teenagers are seeking a device hidden in an underground laboratory. They are attacked by the "Siphon", an armoured alien assassin, but escape after its spaceship crashes into a train, injuring the creature.

Bruno takes Sara and Seth to Friedman at the UFO convention. Although initially sceptical, Friedman believes them after witnessing their powers. They explain that they are aliens from a dying planet 3,000 light years from Earth, whose spaceships use wormholes for interstellar travel. Their government plans to invade Earth to ensure their species' survival, despite widespread opposition. Sara and Seth's scientist parents sought a way to save their planet without invasion, but were arrested before completing their experiment. The teenagers came to Earth to recover its successful results, while the alien military sent the Siphon to stop them. They must retrieve their spacecraft and return home with the results to prevent the invasion and save both worlds.

Friedman joins them and they meet fellow UFOlogist and conspiracy theorist Dr. Donald Harlan, who reveals that the spacecraft has been taken to Witch Mountain, a secret US government base. Harlan distracts the soldiers while Bruno, Friedman and the teenagers reach the base in his RV, but Burke captures them. He orders the teenagers prepared for vivisection, while releasing the adults, confident they will not be believed.

The Siphon attacks the base, allowing Bruno and Friedman to free Sara and Seth. They launch the spacecraft, escape through the mountain's tunnels and kill the Siphon, who has stowed away aboard. The teenagers give Bruno and Friedman a tracking device before departing, and Sara transfers her telepathic powers to Bruno.

Weeks later, Bruno and Friedman publish a successful book, Race to Witch Mountain: A True Story. They promote it on the UFO convention circuit, explaining that the publicity protects them from government retaliation. As they leave a convention, the alien device activates, implying that Sara and Seth may be returning to Earth.

== Cast ==
- Dwayne Johnson as Jack Bruno, who is a Las Vegas cab driver and a former convict. The director wrote in a cab driver as a main character because there was a unique relationship between the driver and his passengers. Fickman explained: "When Dwayne's driving and two aliens appear in his cab, he's stuck with them, there is an implied contract that I will get you to your destination, because that's what he does." This is Johnson's second Disney film, following the 2007 family comedy film The Game Plan, also directed by Andy Fickman.
- AnnaSophia Robb as Sara, sister of Seth, a girl with telekinetic and telepathic powers. Fickman chose Robb based on her performance as Leslie Burke in Bridge to Terabithia. She is kind to Bruno and is the more compassionate of the two siblings. The only time she does not refer to Jack by his full name (Jack Bruno) is when she says goodbye to him, when she refers to him only as "Jack".
- Alexander Ludwig as Seth, brother of Sara, a boy with the power to control his molecular density – "phasing" to become very dense, evidently giving him some degree of invulnerability, or become insubstantial and pass through solid objects. He is very cold to Bruno at first, not trusting him very much, but apologizes in the end saying that if it were not for him they would have not finished their mission. Both siblings talk using overly formal, emotionless, and analytical voices, and are always addressing Bruno by both his first and last name in all situations.
- Carla Gugino as Dr. Alex Friedman, a discredited astrophysicist. Fired from her university, she is relegated to giving a lecture at a UFO conference about hard science. She becomes Jack's love interest. Fickman was a fan of Gugino's role in the short-lived television series Threshold.
- Ciarán Hinds as Henry Burke, the leader of Project Moon Dust. Sarcastic and unscrupulous, he has no regard for morality, as demonstrated after Seth and Sara are imprisoned in Witch Mountain when he orders them to be experimented on so he can harness their powers, regardless of the possibility that they could die. As long as he gets results, whether they live or die does not matter to him. Hinds described his character as a man in black, explaining: "I'm the head of the operation who's contacted directly by a man you never see...[It] is about protecting the country. He's responsible for it, and he'll do whatever needs to be done. That's how he sees it."
- Tom Woodruff Jr. as The Siphon, a well-trained alien assassin. Its full title "Siphon Warrior-series, Deranian 75" is a homage to the character Lucas Deranian (portrayed by Donald Pleasure) in the original 1975 film.
- Garry Marshall as Dr. Donald Harlan, a friend of Alex's and author of UFO-related books, who thinks he can "tell when people are lying to me". He is seen tricking Burke into going after him by trading cars with Jack.
- Tom Everett Scott as Mr. Matheson, a government agent working for Burke
- Cheech Marin as Eddie Cortez, the auto mechanic who gets frustrated when people come to his shop in the middle of the night, when it is closed
- Chris Marquette as Pope, one of Burke's agents
- Eva Huang as Shira the UFO Huntress
- Billy Brown as Mr. Carson
- Dennis Hayden as Ray
- William J. Birnes, the host of UFO Hunters, in a cameo
- Whitley Strieber, author of Communion, in a cameo

Kim Richards and Ike Eisenmann, who portrayed Tia and Tony in the original Witch Mountain films of the 1970s, make cameos respectively as a roadhouse waitress named Tina (a minor change from Richards's character Tia in the 1975 and 1978 films) and as Sheriff Anthony (a reference to Eisenmann's character Tony from the previous films). Meredith Salenger, the star of Disney's 1985 adventure The Journey of Natty Gann makes a cameo as TV reporter Natalie Gann.

== Production ==
Development of an Escape to Witch Mountain (1975) remake was announced in April 2001, with writing duties handed to Adam Kulakow. In July 2007, Walt Disney Pictures hired Andy Fickman to direct Witch Mountain, a "modern re-imagining" of Escape to Witch Mountain, using a script by Matt Lopez. The following August, Dwayne Johnson (most notably famous for portraying The Rock in the WWE) was cast into a lead role, with filming scheduled to begin in March 2008. Fickman did not describe the film as a remake, defining his production as "a new chapter within the world of Witch Mountain". The director also described the book, the original source of the films, as "a very cool dark thriller" and anticipated drawing elements from it that did not exist in the 1975 film. By March 2008, filmmakers were using a new script written by Mark Bomback: now re-titled Race to Witch Mountain, filming began in Los Angeles the same month.

The convention center in Pomona, California was converted into the film's UFO Expo 9, and the interior of Witch Mountain was designed using photographs from a tour of NORAD's Cheyenne Mountain Complex. A cabin for the story was also built in Agua Dulce, California. The director sought assistance from UFO experts, the military, and CIA advisers to shape the elements of the film. He also introduced a new element in the remake, an extraterrestrial creature called Siphon. The creature was conceived by the design team who created the looks for Alien and Predator in the film Alien vs. Predator.

== Music ==
The Offspring's "Stuff Is Messed Up" and Future World Music's "Heart of Fury" were used in promos for the film. The score to Race to Witch Mountain was composed by Trevor Rabin, who recorded his score with a 78-piece ensemble of the Hollywood Studio Symphony and a 24-person choir at the Sony Scoring Stage. Two of the songs in the film were written and performed by country and western band Brokedown Cadillac, which appears briefly in an opening scene.

The film also features the hit single "Fly on the Wall" by Miley Cyrus and "Emergency" by Hollywood Records artist Steve Rushton, on the soundtrack.

== Home media ==
Race to Witch Mountain was released August 4, 2009 in three different sets: a single disc wide-screen DVD with no bonus features; a deluxe DVD edition with bonus content; and a Blu-ray release of the deluxe edition.

== Reception ==
=== Critical response ===
Review aggregation website Rotten Tomatoes reports a 41% rating based on 153 reviews, and an average rating of 5.1/10. The website's critical consensus reads: "Despite the best efforts of a talented cast, Race to Witch Mountain is a tepid reboot that lacks the magic of the original." On Metacritic, the film has a score of 52 out of 100, based on 28 critics, indicating "mixed or average reviews". Audiences polled by CinemaScore gave the film an average grade of "B+" on an A+ to F scale. Roger Ebert gave it two and half stars on four.

=== Box office ===
The film was a modest box office hit. It became the first Disney film in 2009 to open at #1, grossing $24.4 million. The film went on to gross over $67 million at the North American domestic box office, and over $39 million internationally, for a worldwide total of $106 million.
