= Escape to Witch Mountain =

1968 science fiction novel by Alexander Key

- Westminster Press first edition
- Author: Alexander Key
- Genre: Science fiction
- Publisher: Westminster Press (Philadelphia)
- Publication date: 1968
- Publication place: United States
- ISBN: 0-664-32417-7 (US)
- Followed by: Return from Witch Mountain

Escape to Witch Mountain is a science fiction novel written by Alexander Key in 1968. It was adapted for film by Disney as Escape to Witch Mountain in 1975 which spawned the Witch Mountain franchise. The novel was illustrated by Leon B. Wisdom, Jr. and originally published in 1968 by the Westminster Press in Philadelphia, Pennsylvania.

== Plot ==
Tony and Tia are orphaned teenagers who have paranormal abilities. Tony possesses the ability of telekinesis, which he can access most readily through playing music, particularly his harmonica. Tia's strengths include the ability to unlock any door by touch and communication with animals. Both siblings can communicate via ultrasonic speech audible only to each other, but Tia cannot speak normally and is regarded as strange because of this. It is later revealed that Tia is not unusual in this respect, but Tony is; few of their kind have the ability to speak out loud. After their foster guardian, Mrs. Malone, dies, they are placed by social services in a juvenile detention home under grim, unwholesome conditions, where Tia befriends a black cat, Winkie.

Both have suppressed memories of their past, but discover a clue in an old road map hidden along with a cache of money in Tia's "star box", a leather purse-like box with a double-star design on it. In a chance encounter with a nun who is an art teacher, the nun reveals that she once received a letter on stationery with an identical design. The writer, a Blue Ridge Mountains resident with "a name like Caroway, or Garroway, or Hideaway" sought information on students who had "unusual aptitudes". When a man named Lucas Deranian, claiming to be the brother of their deceased father, shows up at the detention center to take custody of them, they instinctively know he is not their uncle and has ulterior motives. However, when they attempt to reach the nun, they find that she has died.

With the assistance of an inner-city Roman Catholic priest, Father O'Day, the pair run away, following the map's route leading towards the Blue Ridge Mountains. As their memories begin to return, they realize that they are actually of extraterrestrial origin, their people having come to Earth because their own planet was drifting towards one of its two suns. Their flying saucer was shot down over Hungary, resulting in the deaths of all but Tony, Tia, and Uncle Bené – a non-relative, but one of their own people, who rescued the children from Soviet captivity. The book ties this event to the Hungarian Uprising in 1956.

Through a series of hardships, Tony and Tia find their way to their own people, who adopted the name Castaway. When the teenagers' would-be captor, Deranian (whom O'Day earlier in the novel had likened to the devil), attempts to interrogate Father O'Day, the priest speaks to the effect that God is capable of creating many worlds and many peoples; that there are "mysteries far beyond [Deranian's] narrow dreaming".

As with most of Alexander Key's stories, the embattled protagonists find that most of the people they meet are untrustworthy, greedy, and hateful — making the decency of the few all the more poignant. O'Day puts himself in danger in order to help Tony and Tia, but he does so willingly, because their battle presents O'Day with an opportunity to fight the agents of evil, which is what he knows is his purpose in life and will deliver meaning to his life.
