= Escape to Witch Mountain (1975 film) =

1975 film by John Hough

- Theatrical release poster
- Directed by: John Hough
- Screenplay by: Robert Malcolm Young
- Based on: Escape to Witch Mountain by Alexander H. Key
- Produced by: Ron Miller; Jerome Courtland
- Starring: Eddie Albert; Ray Milland; Donald Pleasence; Kim Richards; Ike Eisenmann
- Cinematography: Frank V. Phillips, ASC
- Edited by: Robert Stafford
- Music by: Johnny Mandel
- Production company: Walt Disney Productions
- Distributed by: Buena Vista Distribution
- Release date: March 21, 1975 (United States)
- Running time: 97 minutes
- Country: United States
- Language: English
- Box office: $20,000,000

Escape to Witch Mountain is a 1975 American science fantasy film, based on Alexander H. Key's 1968 novel of the same name and directed by John Hough. It was released on March 21, 1975, by Walt Disney Productions and Buena Vista Distribution Company. It is the first film of the Witch Mountain series.

== Plot ==
Tony and Tia are brother and sister whose surname they initially know only as that of their deceased adoptive parents, Malone. The children are placed in an orphanage, where they face difficulties stemming from their strange psychic/psionic abilities: Tony can psychokinetically move and control inanimate objects with the aid of his harmonica, while Tia can communicate telepathically to Tony and commune empathically with animals and experiences premonitions. Tia also possesses minor telekinetic abilities.

Tia carries a "star case" with her at all times, which eventually reveals a strange map. Tia has fragmented memories of her early childhood, including an accident at sea and a man she later remembers as the children's Uncle Bené, who they believe drowned during their rescue.

During a field trip, Tia experiences a premonition and warns wealthy attorney Lucas Deranian against a potentially dangerous accident. Deranian informs his employer, millionaire Aristotle Bolt, of the children's unique abilities. Bolt, obsessed with the paranormal, demands that Deranian retrieve the children at all costs.

Deranian's detective work leads him to the orphanage, where he poses as Tia and Tony's uncle, though not under the name Bené, and takes them to Bolt's mansion. Though initially suspicious of Bolt's motives, Tia and Tony are lured in by the wealthy trappings of Bolt's home. Bolt eventually reveals that he has been monitoring the children via a closed-circuit television system and that he and Deranian are fully aware of their unusual powers. The night of this revelation, Tia and Tony make an escape, using their abilities to psionically control a wild mustang, guard dogs, and the security fence, as well as using Winkie, Tia's cat, to make the allergic security guard let them pass.

Bolt sends Deranian and a thug, Ubermann, after the children. Tia and Tony hide in a Winnebago motor home owned by a crotchety widower, Jason O'Day. Initially negative toward the children, Jason gradually begins to recognize their powers and the truth of their story. Tia's vague memories of a disaster at sea intrigue him. He agrees to take the children on the route indicated by Tia's star case, which leads them to a mountain known as Witch Mountain, home to unexplainable phenomena.

Avoiding Bolt, the law, and an incited mob who are convinced the children are witches, the trio eventually make their way up Witch Mountain, pursued by Deranian and Ubermann, as well as by Bolt in a helicopter. As their memories begin to fully return, the children realize their accident at sea did not involve a boat but a spacecraft. Tony and Tia are actually of extraterrestrial origin; the double star emblem on the star case stands for a binary star system where their home planet was located.

Having come to Earth because their own planet was dying, survivors of the journey made their way to Witch Mountain and formed a community to await the surviving children, each pair in possession of a star case to help them find their way to their new home. Tony and Tia are the first to reach their destination. The siblings are reunited with Uncle Bené (who survived after all, thanks to an "accommodating" shark whom he'd telepathically asked for help) and board another spacecraft. When Bolt and the others leave in defeat, Jason witnesses the spaceship's return as it flies over him to say a final goodbye then landing nearby where the inhabitants now reside.

== Cast ==
- Eddie Albert as Jason O'Day, an embittered widower traveling across the country from home
- Ray Milland as Aristotle Bolt, a ruthless and greedy multi-millionaire obsessed with the paranormal and occult. He tries to expose Tony and Tia and increase his wealth.
- Donald Pleasence as Lucas Deranian, Mr. Bolt's well-to-do attorney
- Kim Richards as Tia Malone, a nine-year-old orphan with psychic powers
- Ike Eisenmann as Tony Malone, Tia's older brother, orphan with telekinetic powers
- Walt Barnes as Sheriff Purdey, a sheriff bribed by Bolt to pursue the children
- Reta Shaw as Mrs. Grindley, owner of the orphanage Tia and Tony are sent to after mourning their foster parents
- Denver Pyle as Uncle Bené, the children's uncle
- Alfred Ryder as Mr. Michaeljohn, Mr. Bolt's Astrologer
- Lawrence Montaigne as Ubermann, a henchman assisting Deranian in his pursuit of the siblings
- Terry Wilson as Biff Jenkins
- George Chandler as Grocer
- Dermott Downs as Truck, a child from the orphanage who bullies Tony to the point he reveals the power
- Don Brodie as Gasoline Attendant
- Paul Sorenson as Sergeant Foss
- Harry Holcombe as Captain Malone
- Sam Edwards as Mate
- Dan Seymour as Mr. Bolt's Psychic
- Eugene Daniels as Cort
- Shepherd Sanders as Ali, Mr. Bolt's guru
- Kyle Richards as young Tia Malone (in "elder Tia's" memories) (uncredited)

== Production ==
=== Differences from the novel ===
Escape to Witch Mountain is based on the novel by Alexander Key. Significant differences from the book include its tone and plot elements. For example, in the book, the children are befriended by Father O'Day, an athletic, young Catholic priest, rather than crusty widower Jason O'Day. The children's ship is shot down, rather than crashed, and the children are olive-skinned, though with light-colored hair, rather than fair-skinned and blonde-haired. In the book, Deranian is the main antagonist, and he is working for a shadowy European cabal who are trying to capture the children for their special powers, instead of for Aristotle Bolt. The novel is set along or near the Atlantic Coast of the United States, whereas the film was shot along the Pacific Coast in California.

=== Filming locations ===
- Carmel, Monterey
- Felton, Santa Cruz County
- Menlo Park, Peninsula School (formerly the Coleman Mansion)
- Pebble Beach, California
- Palo Alto, California Avenue

== Music ==
The score for the film was a limited edition CD release by the Intrada label in 2016.

== Reception ==
The film earned a total lifetime gross at the domestic North American box office of $20 million. The film charted on the all-time domestic North American box office at No. 145 for 'Rated G' films under the MPAA. The film earned $8.5 million in rentals at the North American box office.

Critical reviews were positive. On Rotten Tomatoes the film has an approval rating of 87% based on 52 reviews, with an average grade of 6.3 out of 10. The consensus summarizes: "Escape to Witch Mountain makes up for its lack of high stakes with a charming sense of adventure and excitement."

Roger Ebert of the Chicago Sun-Times was positive, calling it "a scifi thriller that's fun, that's cheerfully implausible, that's scary but not too scary, and it works." Gene Siskel of the Chicago Tribune gave the film three stars out of four, calling it "a solid adventure for the under-12 set. That might sound like a back-handed compliment, but compared to other recent Disney live-action features, Witch Mountain is something special. Only rarely is it juvenile." Vincent Canby of The New York Times called the film not so much scary, but also not exciting as well. Tom Shales of The Washington Post noted that the film "gives children plenty of what they want from a movie—and that includes, conspicuously, repeated instances of kids making adults look like monkeys." Geoff Brown was negative, writing that despite "a strong story line ... the Disney team seem content to fritter it away with silly comedy and footling displays of magic."

== Home media ==
Escape to Witch Mountain was released on VHS in March 4, 1980. It was first released as a Special Edition DVD in Region 1 on September 2, 2003, re-released on DVD in a two-movie collection along with Return from Witch Mountain on September 5, 2006, and re-released as part of the Walt Disney Family Classics line on March 10, 2009.

On October 13, 2015, the film was released via US only Blu-ray exclusively through the now closed Disney Movie Club.

The film is available to stream on Disney+.

== Franchise ==
=== Sequels ===
Escape to Witch Mountain (1975) is the first film in the franchise of the Witch Mountain films. The second and sequel film, Return from Witch Mountain, saw the return of Ike Eisenmann as Tony and Kim Richards as Tia. In September 1978, Return from Witch Mountain was released to theaters on a double feature with Escape to Witch Mountain (1975).

In 1982, Beyond Witch Mountain was produced as a television film and broadcast on CBS through Walt Disney and serves as the third and final film in the series.

=== Remake ===
In 1995, Escape to Witch Mountain was produced as a television film, with a different cast and several details changed or omitted, and released as part of The Wonderful World of Disney.

=== Reboot ===
A reworked Disney live-action feature film Race to Witch Mountain, with a new telling and directed by Andy Fickman, was theatrically released in March 2009.
