= Alexander Key =

American novelist (1904–1979)

- Born: Alexander Hill Key; September 21, 1904; LaPlatte, Maryland, U.S.
- Died: July 25, 1979 (aged 74)
- Education: School of the Art Institute
- Occupation: Writer
- Writing career
- Genres: Science fiction; children's literature

Alexander Hill Key (September 21, 1904 – July 25, 1979) was an American science fiction writer who primarily wrote children's literature.

== Early life ==
Alexander Key was born in 1904 in LaPlatte, Maryland to Alexander Hill and Charlotte (Ryder) Key. The family soon moved to Florida, where he spent the next six years of his life. His father owned a sawmill and cotton gin, both of which were burned by night riders shortly before his father's death when Key was about six. Between the time of his father's death and his mother's death in an accident when he was 15, Key attended at least 14 different schools, including a military school in Georgia.

After his mother's death, Key was raised by various relatives for the rest of his childhood.

At 18, Key enrolled in the School of the Art Institute in Chicago, Illinois, which he attended between 1921 and 1923.

== Literary work ==
Key's novel Escape to Witch Mountain was made into a popular live-action film by Disney in 1975, with several sequels in the following years. His novel The Incredible Tide became an anime series called Future Boy Conan in 1978.

Key is known for his portrayals of alien but human-looking people who have tremendously strong psychic/psionic abilities, a close communion with nature, and who can telepathically speak with animals. In his nonfiction book The Strange White Doves, he professed his belief that animals are conscious, thinking, feeling, perceiving, independent, and self-aware intelligent beings, and that they have subtle ways of communicating, perhaps via empathy or telepathy. The protagonists of Key's books are often ostracized, feared, or persecuted because of their astonishing abilities or extraterrestrial origins, and Key uses this as a clear metaphor for racism and other prejudice.

In several of his novels (most notably The Case of the Vanishing Boy), Key portrays some sort of communal withdrawal from society by a group of like-minded individuals. Key sometimes depicted government-sponsored social services for children as inefficient or even counterproductive in its efforts: in The Forgotten Door, social services is presented as a clearly undesirable alternative for the protagonist Little Jon, and, in Escape to Witch Mountain, Tony and Tia actively flee the system. In both cases, however, it is for a very logical reason: the characters are "not from around here". All they want to do is go home and, happily, a few of us locals have the decency to help them do so.

Another Alexander Key theme is that good and decent people deserve to escape to a place worthy of them.

== Selected works ==
=== As illustrator ===
- In the Light of Myth: Selections from the World's Myths, compiled and interpreted by Rannie B. Baker (1925) OCLC 593232
- Real Legends of New England, G. Waldo Browne (1930) OCLC 1710918
- The Book of Dragons, selected and edited by O. Muiriel Fuller (1931) OCLC 2391529
- Suwannee River: Strange Green Land, Cecile Hulse Matschat (1938) OCLC 484454

=== As writer ===
Books

- The Red Eagle: A Tale for Young Aviators (1930) OCLC 3442600
- Liberty or Death (1936)
- With Daniel Boone on the Caroliny Trail (1941)
- The Wrath and the Wind (1949)
- Island Light (1950)
- Sprockets: A Little Robot (1963)
- Rivets and Sprockets (1964)
- The Forgotten Door (1965) OCLC 0590403982
- Bolts: a Robot Dog (1966)
- Mystery of the Sassafras Chair (1968)
- Escape to Witch Mountain (1968) OCLC 436504
- The Golden Enemy (1969)
- The Incredible Tide (1970)
- Flight to the Lonesome Place (1971)
- The Strange White Doves (1972)
- The Preposterous Adventures of Swimmer (1973)
- The Magic Meadow (1975)
- Jagger, the Dog from Elsewhere (1976)
- The Sword of Aradel (1977)
- Return from Witch Mountain (1978) – novelization of the 1978 film. OCLC 3542494
- The Case of the Vanishing Boy (1979)

Short Stories

- "Six Heads in Pawn" (The Open Road for Boys, Oct 1934)
- "The Black Orchid" (The Open Road for Boys, Mar 1935)
- "The Night Hunter" (American Boy, Aug 1935)
- "Leopard Men" (Dime Adventure Magazine, Dec 1935)
- "One Night of Liberty" (Dynamic Adventures, Mar 1936)
- "Brothers of the Didi" (Top-Notch, Jul 1936)
- "The Jade Amulet" (Top-Notch, Aug 1936)
- "The Diamond Pit" (Argosy, Aug 1, 1936)
- "Formula for Death" (Clues Detective Stories, Aug 1936)
- "The Golden Lady" (Top-Notch, Oct 1936)
- "Death Certificate" (Argosy, Nov 14, 1936)
- "Find the Button" (Clues Detective Stories, Nov 1936)
- "Clancy" (Cosmopolitan, Jan 1937)
- "The Book with the Golden Leaves" (Argosy, Jan 16, 1937)
- "House of the Sword" (Top-Notch, Mar 1937)
- "Fortune Has Horns" (Argosy, Jul 17, 1937)
- "A Whip for the Colonel" (Argosy, Dec 25, 1937)
- "The Captain Has a Cat" (Argosy, Jan 8, 1938)
- "The Brothers Romano" (Argosy, Jan 29, 1938)
- "The Devil's Jaw" (Argosy, Aug 13, 1938)
- "Pheasants for the Fox" (Argosy, Jan 28, 1939)
- "Luck on the Ladybird" (Argosy, Mar 25, 1939)
- "Shorty" (Pearson's Magazine, July 1939)
- "Red Snapper" (Saturday Evening Post, Jul 22, 1939)
- "Saltwater Scramble" (Argosy, Aug 26, 1939)
- "Black Bayou" (Argosy, Dec 2, 1939)
- "Breeze o'Wind" (Saturday Evening Post, Aug 30, 1941)
- "They'll Never Get Me" (Saturday Evening Post, Sep 4, 1948)

Articles

- "Revolving Monsters" (Saturday Evening Post, Sep 6, 1941)
- "Honey an' Hoecake" (Saturday Evening Post, May 15, 1943)
