= Supervan =

Supervan may refer to:

- Supervan (film), a 1977 film
- Ford Supervan, promotional vehicle combining a Ford Transit van with the chassis and performance of a sports racing car
- a model of Reliant Regal with a side-hinged rear door
- a nickname of Sarel van der Merwe, a South African former rally driver
