= Bill Butler (film editor) =

English film editor (1933–2017)

Bill Butler (1933 – 4 June 2017) was an English film editor. He was known for editing A Clockwork Orange (1971), for which he was nominated for the Academy Award for Best Film Editing. Other notable films edited by Butler include Buona Sera, Mrs. Campbell (1968), A Touch of Class (1973) and The Duchess and the Dirtwater Fox (1976), all directed by Melvin Frank. He died in Sherman Oaks, California in 2017. A Clockwork Orange was listed as the 40th best-edited film of all time in a 2012 survey of members of the Motion Picture Editors Guild.

== Selected filmography ==
Editor
Year	Film	Director	Notes
1968	Buona Sera, Mrs. Campbell	Melvin Frank	First collaboration with Melvin Frank
1970	One More Time	Jerry Lewis	
1971	A Clockwork Orange	Stanley Kubrick	
1973	A Touch of Class	Melvin Frank	Second collaboration with Melvin Frank
1974	Vampira	Clive Donner	
1976	Killer Force	Val Guest	
1976	The Duchess and the Dirtwater Fox	Melvin Frank	Third collaboration with Melvin Frank
1976	Bittersweet Love	David Miller	
1977	Supervan	Lamar Card	
1977	Joyride	Joseph Ruben	First collaboration with Joseph Ruben
1978	Our Winning Season	Joseph Ruben	Second collaboration with Joseph Ruben
1979	Lost and Found	Melvin Frank	Fourth collaboration with Melvin Frank
1980	Gorp	Joseph Ruben	Third collaboration with Joseph Ruben
1980	How to Beat the High Cost of Living	Robert Scheerer	
1981	On the Right Track	Lee Philips	
1982	A Little Sex	Bruce Paltrow	
1984	Up the Creek	Robert Butler	
1985	Pray for Death	Gordon Hessler	First collaboration with Gordon Hessler
1986	The Men's Club	Peter Medak	
1987	Walk Like a Man	Melvin Frank	Fifth collaboration with Melvin Frank
1988	Seven Hours to Judgment	Beau Bridges	
1989	Cutting Class	Rospo Pallenberg	
1991	Journey of Honor	Gordon Hessler	Second collaboration with Gordon Hessler
1994	Of Love and Shadows	Betty Kaplan	
2001	What Matters Most	Jane Cusumano	
2002	Shattered Lies	Gerry Lively	
2005	Diamond Zero	Annelie Wilder; David Gaz	
2007	Never Say Macbeth	Christopher J. Prouty	
2010	Magic Man	Stuart Cooper	

Editorial department
Year	Film	Director	Role	Notes
1952	The Crimson Pirate	Robert Siodmak	Second assistant editor	Uncredited
1962	The Lion	Jack Cardiff	Assistant editor	Uncredited
1981	St. Helens	Ernest Pintoff	Additional editor	
1985	Hellhole	Pierre De Moro; Tom DeSimone	Editorial consultant	
1993	A Far Off Place	Mikael Salomon	Additional editor	
2006	Love and Debate	Jessica Kavana Dornbusch	Additional editor	

Sound department
Year	Film	Director	Role
1963	The Mind Benders	Basil Dearden	Sound editor
1963	Bitter Harvest	Peter Graham Scott	Sound editor
1964	Mozambique	Robert Lynn	Sound editor
1965	Return from the Ashes	J. Lee Thompson	Sound editor
1966	A Funny Thing Happened on the Way to the Forum	Richard Lester	Sound editor

Direct-to-video films

Editor
Year	Film	Director	Notes
1990	Fatal Charm	Fritz Kiersch	Uncredited

Documentaries

Editor
Year	Film	Director
1966	Goal!: The World Cup	Ross Devenish; Abidin Dino

Shorts

Editor
Year	Film	Director
1989	Leonardo's Dream	Douglas Trumbull
1990	The Magic Balloon	Ronald Neame
2003	The Aura	Armen Ohannesian
2004	Fish Burglars	Gideon Brower
2005	Stratagem	Michael Rainin
2006	Chloe	Jeff Bergman
2010	L.A. Harmony	Todd Bendera
—	Waiting for Woody Allen	Michael Rainin

TV movies

Editor
Year	Film	Director
1974	Great Expectations	Joseph Hardy
1986	Club Med	Bob Giraldi
1994	Secret Sins of the Father	Beau Bridges
1996	Gang in Blue	Melvin Van Peebles; Mario Van Peebles
1997	Not in This Town	Donald Wrye
1998	The Hunted	Stuart Cooper
1998	Chameleon	Stuart Cooper

Editorial department
Year	Film	Director	Role
1974	Fer-de-Lance	Russ Mayberry	Editorial supervisor
1981	St. Helens	Ernest Pintoff	Additional editor

Sound department
Year	Film	Director	Role
1966	The Legend of Young Dick Turpin: Part 1	James Neilson	Sound editor

TV series

Editor
Year	Title	Notes
1954	Fussball Wellmeisterschaft	—
1967−68	Man in a Suitcase	10 episodes
1982−83	St. Elsewhere	7 episodes
1995	Deadly Games	1 episode

Sound department
Year	Title	Role	Notes
1966	Walt Disney's Wonderful World of Color	Sound editor	1 episode

TV shorts

Editor
Year	Film	Director
1975	The People's Lawyer	R. Durrell Robinson
1976	Child Abuse	R. Durrell Robinson
1976	Friday Night Burn	R. Durrell Robinson
