= The Return of the Archons =

- Star Trek: The Original Series episode
- Episode no.: Season 1 Episode 21
- Directed by: Joseph Pevney
- Story by: Gene Roddenberry
- Teleplay by: Boris Sobelman
- Cinematography by: Jerry Finnerman
- Original air date: February 9, 1967
- Running time: 50 minutes

Guest appearances
- Harry Townes – Reger; Torin Thatcher – Marplon; Brioni Farrell – Tula; Sid Haig – First Lawgiver; Charles Macaulay – Landru; Jon Lormer – Tamar; Morgan Farley – Hacom; Christopher Held – Sociologist Lindstrom; Eddie Paskey – Mr. Lesley; Sean Morgan – Lt. O'Neil; Ralph Maurer – Bilar; David L. Ross – Guard

Episode chronology
← Previous "Court Martial"	Next → "Space Seed"
- Star Trek: The Original Series season 1

"The Return of the Archons" is the twenty-first episode of the first season of the American science fiction television series Star Trek. Written by Boris Sobelman (based on a story by Gene Roddenberry), and directed by Joseph Pevney, it first aired on NBC on February 9, 1967.

In the episode, the crew of the Enterprise visit a seemingly peaceful planet whose inhabitants are "of the Body", controlled by an unseen ruler, and enjoy a night of violence during "Festival".

The episode contains Star Trek's first reference to the Prime Directive.

== Plot ==
The USS Enterprise, under the command of Captain Kirk, arrives at the planet Beta III in the C-111 system where the USS Archon was reported lost nearly 100 years earlier. Lt. Sulu is the only member of the landing party who beams up from the planet's surface, and exhibits inexplicable euphoria, as well as insisting the crew "is not of the Body" and referring to them as "Archons". Kirk beams down with another party to investigate. They find the inhabitants living in a 19th-century Earth-style culture, ruled over by cloaked and cowled "Lawgivers" and a reclusive dictator, Landru. Their arrival is shortly followed by the "Festival", a period of violence, destruction, and sexual aggression.

Kirk's landing party seeks shelter from the mob at a boarding house owned by Reger. A friend of Reger's suspects that the visitors are "not of the Body" (the whole of Betan society), and summons Lawgivers. When the landing party refuses to come with the Lawgivers, the Lawgivers become immobile. Reger leads the Enterprise landing team to a hiding place. En route, a telepathic command causes the townspeople to attack the landing party. They stun the attackers with their phasers, and find Lt. O'Neil, the other member of the original landing party, among them. They take O'Neil with them, but keep him sedated on Reger's advice. Reger reveals that Landru "pulled the Archons down from the skies". Contacting the ship, Kirk learns that heat beams from the planet are attacking the Enterprise, which must use all its power for its shields. Its orbit is deteriorating and it will crash in 12 hours unless the beams are turned off.

A projection of Landru appears in the hiding place, and Kirk and his team are rendered unconscious by hypersonic waves. The landing party is imprisoned in a dungeon. Dr. Leonard McCoy is "absorbed into the Body", i.e., placed under Landru's mental control, but Marplon, a member of the underground against Landru, rescues Kirk and Spock. Reger and Marplon tell how Landru saved their society from war and anarchy 6,000 years before and reduced the planet's technology to a simpler level.

Overhearing their whispered plans, McCoy summons the Lawgivers. Kirk and Spock subdue them and don their robes. Marplon takes Kirk and Spock to the Hall of Audiences, where priests commune with Landru. A projection of Landru appears and threatens them. Kirk and Spock use their phasers to blast through the wall and expose a computer programmed by Landru, who died 6,000 years before. The computer neutralizes their phasers. Kirk and Spock argue with the computer, that because it has destroyed the creativity of the people by disallowing their free will, it is evil and should self-destruct, freeing the people of Beta III. The computer suffers 'a mental breakdown' and complies.

The heat beams stop, and the Enterprise is saved. Kirk agrees to leave Federation advisors and educators on the planet to help reform the civilization.

== Production ==
"The Return of the Archons" was the first appearance in Star Trek for actor Charles Macaulay. He later appeared as Jaris, prefect of Argelius II, in the second-season episode "Wolf in the Fold". This was actor Jon Lormer's second appearance on Star Trek. He had previously appeared as Dr. Theodore Haskins in the episode "The Menagerie" and made a third appearance as an unnamed old man in the third-season episode "For the World Is Hollow and I Have Touched the Sky". David L. Ross made his third appearance on Star Trek in this episode, after having appeared as a security guard in the episodes "Miri" and as a transporter chief in "The Galileo Seven" earlier in the first season. He received his first speaking role as Lieutenant Johnson in the second season episode "The Trouble with Tribbles", and appeared in another speaking role as Lt. Galloway in the second season episode "The Omega Glory". Character actor Sid Haig has a role as one of the hooded Lawgivers who first confront the landing party in Reger's boarding house.

"The Return of the Archons" introduces for the first time the Federation's Prime Directive. However, an important modification is made to the absolutist non-interference rule almost immediately. Kirk argues that the Prime Directive does not bar interference with other cultures, but rather bars interference only with a "living and growing" culture. Scholar Eric Greene argues this is reflective of the "frontier myth" of Star Trek and American foreign policy in the late 20th century, in which a superior culture expands to impose its understanding of freedom and progress on others. M. Keith Booker, interpreting the politics of Star Trek, agrees, noting that in leaving behind a sociological team to "help restore the planet's culture to a more human form" means restoring it to one that "suits the values of the Federation and twenty-third century Earth." Indeed, the Prime Directive would only truly be honored during the series in the episode "Bread and Circuses".

Location shooting for "Return of the Archons" occurred on the 40 Acres backlot in Culver City, California. The street scenes were part of the "Town of Atlanta", a set which consists of a mid-1800s city street, a town square, and a residential area (originally constructed for the motion picture Gone with the Wind in 1939). The dungeon set was first constructed for this episode, and reused in the first-season episode "Errand of Mercy" and the second-season episode "Catspaw". Marplon's absorption booth console was also reused several times in the series. It reappeared (with modifications) as a relay station in the second-season episode "I, Mudd", as a Federation outpost control panel in the third-season episode "The Lights of Zetar", the housing for the Romulan cloaking device in the third-season episode "The Enterprise Incident", and as the force field control station at the penal colony Elba II in the third-season episode "Whom Gods Destroy". The computer that ruled Beta III was seen again (slightly modified) in the first-season episode "A Taste of Armageddon". The doors to the Hall of Audiences were a re-use of doors previously seen in the episode "What Are Little Girls Made Of?" and were reused in "A Taste of Armageddon".

The episode contains two continuity errors. When the "Festival" breaks out, the mob begins hurling stones at the landing party. A large "rock" made of papier-mâché accidentally hits one of the Enterprise security personnel in the head. The actor stayed in character and kept running to ensure that the take was not ruined. When the landing party rests in a bedroom at Reger's boarding house, the windows are blacked out in all wide shots, but clearly transparent and showing the street outside in all close-ups.

== Reception ==
Eric Greene observes that "Return of the Archons" is the first time Star Trek attempted to deal with issues of war and peace raised by the Vietnam War, and established a template that was used in a number of subsequent episodes such as "A Taste of Armageddon", "This Side of Paradise", and "For the World Is Hollow and I Have Touched the Sky". The Federation's moral superiority is exhibited through its emphasis on individual freedom, progress, and resort to violence only in self-defense, while the Betan society is criticized for its state control, stagnation, and reliance on aggression. Greene argues that these episodes prefigure the Borg Collective, a far more overt totalitarian (even Soviet) metaphor introduced in the series Star Trek: The Next Generation. Scholar M. Keith Booker notes that the episode presents Kirk "at his most American", valuing struggle against obstacles as the highest virtue and denouncing the Betan utopia (equated with Stalinism) as dehumanizing.

Scholars Michael A. Burstein and John Kenneth Muir note that the plot of "The Return of the Archons" (in which Kirk and company discover a stagnant society worshiping a god-like being whom Kirk destroys with human illogic) became something of a cliché in the decades after the series ended. Burstein criticizes the episode for attacking organized religion, which it presented as suppressing freedom and creativity. But religious scholar Michael Anthony Corey praises the episode for realizing that the elimination of a huge number of moral evils can occur only by causing a single, massive moral evil (the loss of free will). Corey points out that the episode seems to draw heavily on German philosopher Gottfried Leibniz's "Principle of Radical Optimism", which concludes that ours is the best of all possible worlds because it contains the conditions for human existence (and not because it has a greater or lesser number of moral evils).

Zack Handlen of The A.V. Club gave the episode a "B" rating, describing the episode as having a "loose, unpolished feeling" and lacking "the force of the series' best story lines", but praised the story's ambition.

"Return of the Archons" is one of actor Ben Stiller's favorite episodes of Star Trek. "Red Hour", the time of day when the "Festival" begins, is the name of his production company.

This was noted as one of the episodes of Star Trek that does not have a traditional villain, and noted that computers gone wrong as a villain might be expected in a technologically advanced culture as depicted by Star Trek.

== Continuity ==
Beta III and the computer reappear in "No Small Parts", the tenth and final episode of Star Trek: Lower Decks season 1.

== In popular culture ==
The "Festival" in this episode served as the inspiration behind the 2013 film The Purge, and the subsequent media franchise it spawned.

== See also ==
- AI takeover in popular culture
- Existential risk from artificial intelligence
- Kronia
- Plot twist
- Two Minutes Hate

== Bibliography ==
- Booker, M. Keith (2008). Telotte, J.P. (ed.). "The Politics of 'Star Trek'". The Essential Science Fiction Television Reader. Lexington, Ky: University Press of Kentucky.
- Burstein, Michael (2006). Gerrold, David; Sawyer, Robert J. (eds.). "We Find the One Quite Adequate: Religious Attitudes in 'Star Trek'". Boarding the Enterprise: Transporters, Tribbles, and the Vulcan Death Grip in Gene Roddenberry's 'Star Trek'. Dallas, Tex.: BenBella Books.
- Corey, Michael Anthony (1995). Job, Jonah, and the Unconscious: A Psychological Interpretation of Evil and Spiritual Growth in the Old Testament. Lanham, Md.: University Press of America.
- Farrand, Phil (2010). The Nitpicker's Guide for Classic Trekkers. New York: Random House.
- Greene, Eric (2006). Gerrold, David; Sawyer, Robert J. (eds.). "The Prime Question". Boarding the Enterprise: Transporters, Tribbles, and the Vulcan Death Grip in Gene Roddenberry's 'Star Trek'. Dallas, Tex.: BenBella Books.
- Muir, John Kenneth (2005). Exploring Space, 1999: An Episode Guide and Complete History of the Mid-1970s Science Fiction Television Series. Jefferson, N.C.: McFarland & Co.
- Okuda, Michael; Okuda, Denise; Mirek, Debbie (2011). The Star Trek Encyclopedia. New York: Simon and Schuster.
