= Jared Martin =

American actor (1941–2017)

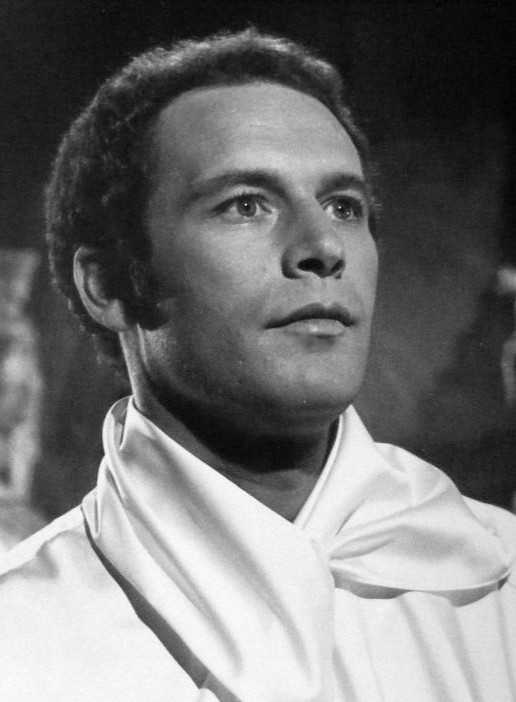
- Martin in The Fantastic Journey (1977)
- Born: Jared Christopher Martin; December 21, 1941; Manhattan, New York, U.S.
- Died: May 24, 2017 (aged 75); Philadelphia, Pennsylvania, U.S.
- Education: Columbia University (BA)
- Occupation: Actor
- Years active: 1968–2003
- Spouses: Nancy Fales (m. 1963; div. 1977) Carol Vogel (m. 1979; div. 1984) Yu Wei (m. 2000)
- Children: 1

Jared Christopher Martin (December 21, 1941 – May 24, 2017) was an American film and television actor. He was best known for his role as Steven "Dusty" Farlow in the 1978 series Dallas and for roles on two science fiction TV series, The Fantastic Journey and War of the Worlds.

== Early years ==
Martin was born in Manhattan to Charles Elmer Martin, a cover artist and cartoonist for The New Yorker, and his wife, Florence Taylor, an artist and homemaker. He began acting at the age of ten in a local children's theater group. After graduating from the Putney School and Columbia University, where his roommate was Brian De Palma, he spent a summer apprenticing with Joseph Papp's Shakespeare in the Park. After graduating, he worked for a couple of years at The New York Times as a copy boy and thumbnail book reviewer for the Sunday edition.

== Acting career ==
Leaving his newspaper job, Martin joined a summer stock theatre company in Cape May, New Jersey; then spent a season with Boston Classical Repertory, and eventually rejoined Papp at his new Public Theater in Manhattan. In 1965, he co-founded Group 6 Productions, a New York film and stage production company for which he directed A Night on the Town. In 1966, he played the lead role in his former roommate DePalma's first feature film, Murder à la Mod.

During the period from the early 1970s through the early 1990s, he was a common presence in episodic television, with guest roles in such popular fare as The Partridge Family, Dan August, The Bold Ones, Toma, Shaft, Get Christie Love, The Rookies, Switch, Logan's Run, The Six Million Dollar Man, Project UFO, The Waltons, a two-part episode of the Lynda Carter series Wonder Woman, CHiPs, Hart to Hart, Tales of the Gold Monkey, Fantasy Island, Scarecrow and Mrs. King, Knight Rider, Airwolf, The Love Boat, Magnum, P.I., Hotel, Hunter, Silk Stalkings, Columbo and L.A. Law.

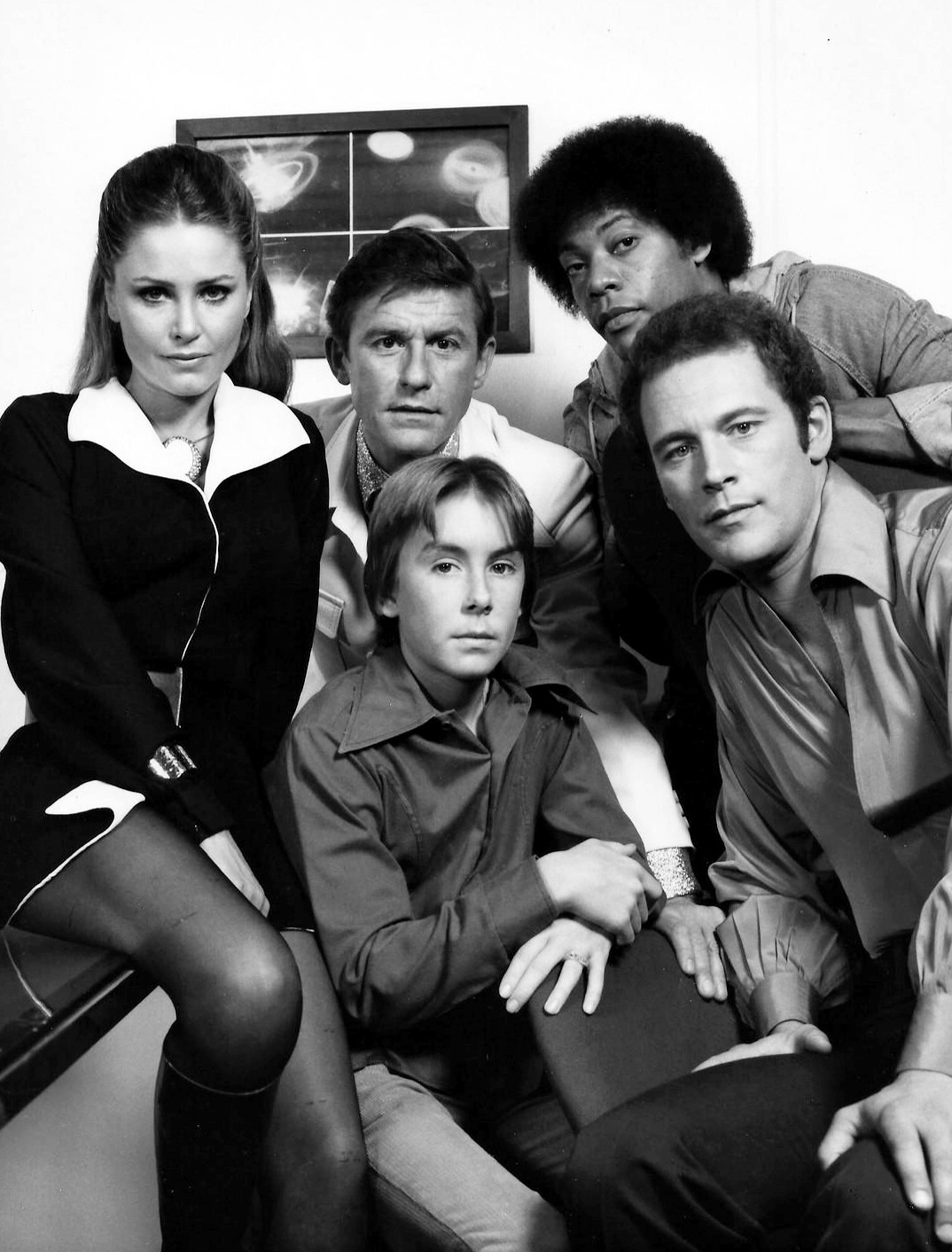
Cast of TV's The Fantastic Journey. Back row, L-R: Katie Saylor, Roddy McDowall, Carl Franklin. Front row: Ike Eisenmann and Jared Martin

Martin also was a series regular on several network television series, including the prime-time soap Dallas as Steven "Dusty" Farlow, who appeared intermittently on the series from 1979 to the end of the series run in 1991. Before then, he appeared on the short-lived science fiction series The Fantastic Journey (1977) playing Varian and a few episodes in the 1978–79 season of the reboot series How the West Was Won playing Frank Grayson. During his first period of absence from Dallas, Martin studied with Lee Strasberg. The last of Martin's regular lead roles was on War of the Worlds, which ran for two seasons from 1988, as Dr. Harrison Blackwood.

He continued to act in off-Broadway productions and made an unreleased film that caught the eye of a casting director at Columbia Pictures. He also alternated between living in Rome and New York.

He performed in Broadway's Torch Song Trilogy. In 1988, he moved to Toronto to star in War of the Worlds. After that series was canceled in 1990, he spent the next 18 months traveling, writing, and working on photography.

In 1994, entrepreneur Jeffrey Seder asked Martin to direct In Deeper, a feature-length docudrama that celebrated crime-fighting local citizens, as part of then-Mayor Ed Rendell's Heroes of the Streets campaign in Philadelphia. Martin co-founded the independent film production company Lost Dog Productions which produced films for social service and cultural nonprofits, including Smarty Jones - A Pennsylvania Champion and hosted Philly Live, an interview talk show series. From 2004 to 2007, he was senior lecturer at the University of the Arts in Philadelphia where he taught acting and directing.

== Marriages ==
Jared Martin was married three times and divorced twice, to:

- Nancy Fales (1963–1977)
- Carol Vogel (1979–1984)
- Yu Wei (2000–2017).

== Death ==
Martin died from pancreatic cancer on May 24, 2017, at his home in Philadelphia at age 75.

== Partial filmography ==
=== Films ===
- Murder à la Mod (1968) – Chris
- The Wedding Party (1969) – Wedding Guest #6
- Mississippi Summer (1971)
- Lapin 360 (1972)
- Westworld (1973) – Technician #3
- The Second Coming of Suzanne (1974) – Logan
- The Lonely Lady (1983) – George Ballantine
- Warriors of the Year 2072 (1984) – Drake
- The Sea Serpent (1985) – Linares
- Quiet Cool (1986) – Mike Prior
- Karate Warrior (1987) – Paul Scott
- Aenigma (1987) – Dr. Robert Anderson
- Twin Sitters (1994) – Frank Hillhurst

=== Television ===
- How the West Was Won (as Frank Grayson)
- The Silent Force (as Neil Becker in "The Wax Jungle"; 1970)
- The Rookies (various roles, 4 episodes)
- Cannon (The Shadow Man, Episode; 1972)
- Griff (episode "Death by Prescription"; 1973)
- Shaft (as Victor Perrine) (episode "The Killing"; 1973)
- Columbo (as Harry Alexander in "A Stitch in Crime"; 1973)
- Get Christie Love! (as George Lomax) (episode "Fatal Image"; 1974)
- The Fantastic Journey (1977)
- Logan's Run (episode "Fear Factor"; 1977)
- The Six Million Dollar Man (as Torg) (episode "The Long Island"; 1978)
- The Waltons (as Derek Pembroke) (episode "The Portrait"; 1978)
- Wonder Woman (as David/Leon) (episode "Phantom of the Roller Coaster"; 1979)
- Dallas (as Dusty Farlow) (1979–1982; 1985; 1991)
- CHiPs (as Bright) (episode "Hot Wheels"; 1979)
- The Incredible Hulk (as Jack Stewart) (episode "Free Fall"; 1980)
- Hart to Hart (as Dr. Kellin) (episode "Operation Murder"; 1981)
- " Love Boat as Paul (episode Meet The Author) 1982
- Tales of the Gold Monkey (as Ted Harrison) (episode "Trunk from the Past"; 1982)
- Fantasy Island (as Dr. Christopher) (episode "What's the Matter with Kids?/Island of Horrors"; 1983)
- Knight Rider (as Dr. David Halston) (episode "Knight of the Drones"; 1984)
- Scarecrow and Mrs. King (as Alan Squires) (episode "The Artful Dodger"; 1984)
- Airwolf (as James Graydon) (episode "Santini's Millions"; 1985)
- Magnum, P.I. (as Arthur Houston) (episode "Novel Connection"; 1986)
- Murder, She Wrote (2 episodes): as Arthur Houston in "Magnum on Ice" (1986 episode) and as Spencer Langley in "It's a Dog's Life" (1984)
- Hunter (as Ringerman) (episode "Shades"; 1987)
- One Life to Live (as Dr. Donald Lamarr) (1987–1988)
- War of the Worlds (1988–1990)
