= The Fantastic Journey =

American television series

- Genre: Science fiction
- Created by: Bruce Lansbury
- Written by: D. C. Fontana; Richard Fielder; Robert Hamilton; Leonard Katzman; Ken Kolb; Howard Livingstone; Michael Michaelian; Katharyn Powers
- Directed by: Barry Crane; Alf Kjellin; Art Fisher; Victor French; Vincent McEveety; Andrew V. McLaglen; David Moessinger; Irving J. Moore; Virgil Vogel
- Starring: Jared Martin; Ike Eisenmann; Carl Franklin; Katie Saylor; Roddy McDowall
- Composers: Dick DeBenedictis; Robert Prince
- Country of origin: United States
- Original language: English
- No. of seasons: 1
- No. of episodes: 10

Production
- Executive producer: Bruce Lansbury
- Producer: Leonard Katzman
- Camera setup: Single-camera
- Running time: 45–48 minutes
- Production companies: Bruce Lansbury Productions; Columbia Pictures Television

Original release
- Network: NBC
- Release: February 3 – June 16, 1977

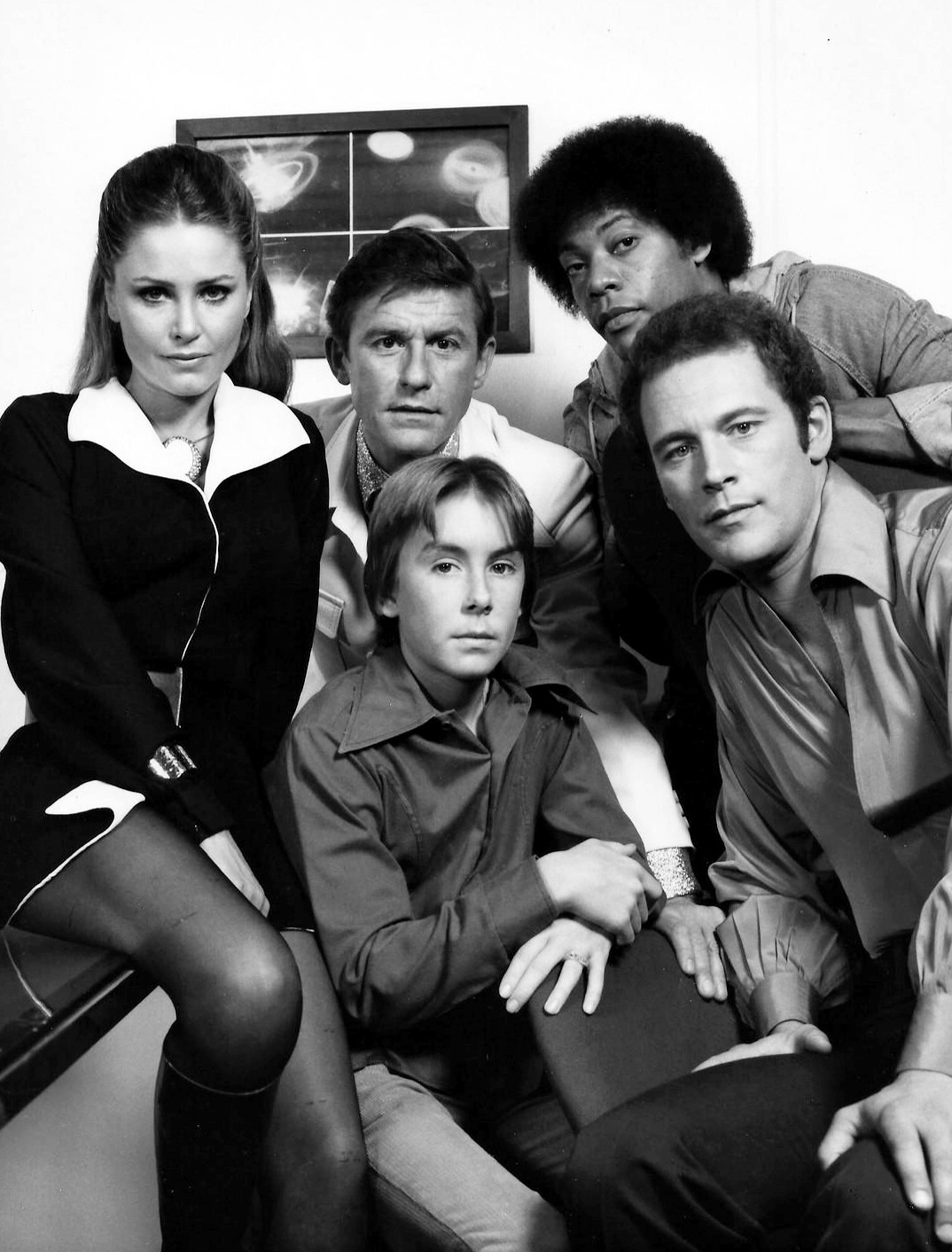
Back row, L-R: Katie Saylor, Roddy McDowall, Carl Franklin. Front row: Ike Eisenmann and Jared Martin.

The Fantastic Journey is an American science fiction television series that was originally aired on NBC from February 3 through June 16, 1977. It was originally intended to run 13 episodes, as a mid-season replacement, but NBC cancelled the series in April, after the ninth episode aired. A tenth episode, already produced, was broadcast two months later.

== Overview ==
The series concerns a family and their associates who charter a boat out into the Caribbean for a scientific expedition. In the Bermuda Triangle, after encountering a glowing green cloud, accompanied by the eerie disembodied sound of ship's bells, the group find themselves shipwrecked on a mysterious uncharted island from which they cannot escape.

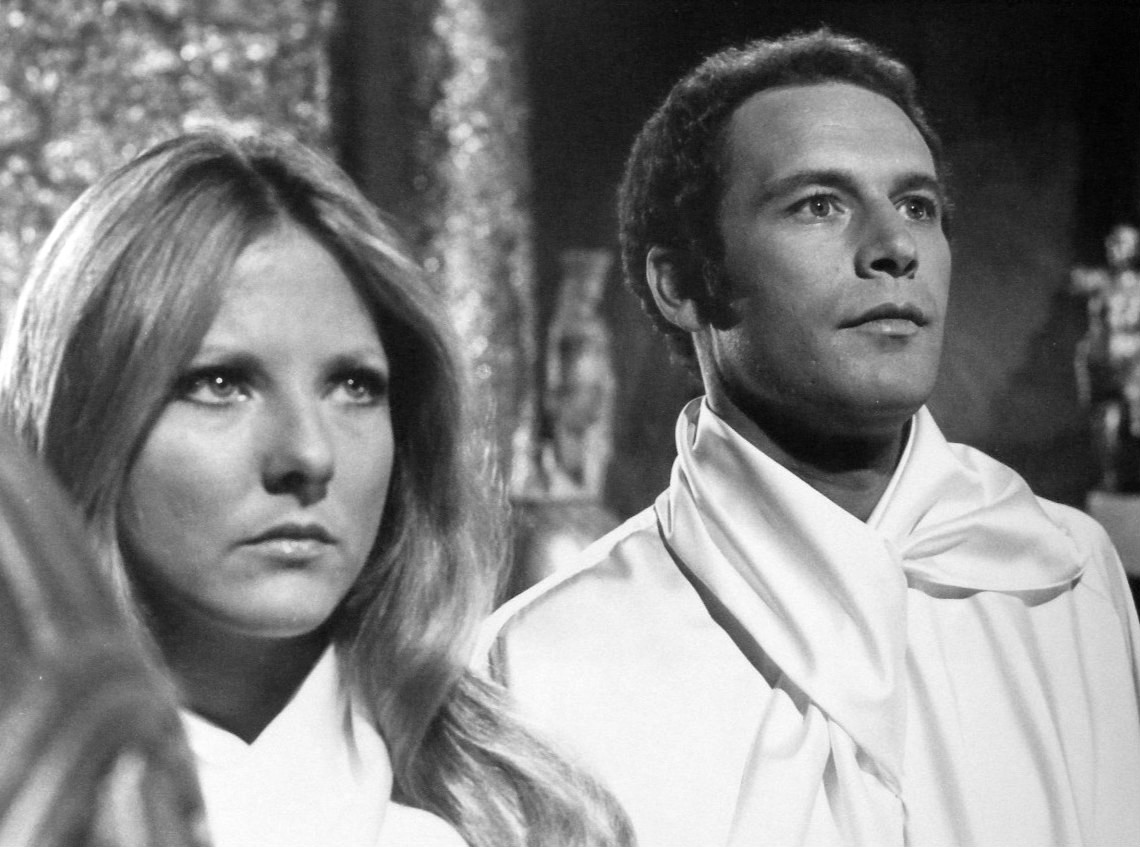
Christina Hart as Gwenith, with Jared Martin as Varian, in "An Act of Love"

They encounter Varian (Jared Martin), initially disguised as an Arawak native, who is later revealed to be from the year 2230. A 23rd-century pacifist, musician and healer, Varian explains to the travelers that, like he and many before them, they have been caught in a space/time continuum where people from the past, present, future and from other worlds are trapped, co-existing on the island in a series of "Time Zones". The only way home can be found in a place called "Evoland", which lies "far to the rising sun" (it was indicated in interviews at the time that Evoland was also the name of the island). The only way to travel between Time Zones is via invisible gateways that instantaneously transport individuals or groups from one zone to another. In one episode, "Beyond the Mountain", the group also encounters a second cloud, which has much the same effect, but which also splits up the group.

After the initial pilot story, a steady group of travelers forms around Varian as de facto leader, and the series then follows this group as they travel across the many Time Zones of the island to find Evoland. On their way, they encounter people from different planets and times who are also trapped on the island and who have adapted to their plight in different ways.

The pilot initially suggested the historical past would be explored. The series, though, soon adopted a consistently futuristic style during the series following pressure from the network. Three characters after the pilot were also dropped, as they wanted a more exotic group of travelers, hence the arrival of Liana and Willoway. Liana disappeared from the last two episodes when Katie Saylor fell ill.

== Cast ==
- Varian (Jared Martin): "A man from the 23rd century possessing awesome powers", Varian generally uses a kind of crystalline "tuning fork" device called the Sonic Energizer through which he focuses his thoughts into what is described as a sonic manipulation of matter. The device is completely useless in anyone else's hands, and seems capable of a huge variety of tasks, from opening doors to disrupting electrical systems to large scale acts of destruction, as well as its apparently intended function as a diagnostic and healing device. Following the departure of Professor Paul Jordan at the end of the pilot film, Varian takes over as de facto leader to the travelers and adopts a parental role over Paul's teenage son, Scott (most notable in episodes such as "An Act of Love" and "Turnabout").
- Scott Jordan (Ike Eisenmann): "The 13-year-old son of a famous scientist", Scott has an excellent knowledge of Earth history and events, but is still young and has much to learn.
- Dr. Fred Walters (Carl Franklin): "A young doctor just out of medical school" whose impulsive and rather hot-headed nature acts as a counterpoint to the calm, pacifistic Varian. A friend of Scott's father and the only other member of the group from the same time period, the athletic black physician takes the role of protective "older brother" with the young teen.
- Liana (Katie Saylor): "Daughter of an Atlantean father and an extraterrestrial mother". The beautiful blonde Liana possessed greater than human physical strength due to her mother being from a planet with a higher gravity than Earth. (However, not much use was ever actually made of Liana's strength.) She also had powerful psychic abilities (presumably due to her mixed heritage) which allow her to, among other things, telepathically communicate with animals - especially her cat Sil-El. Saylor left the show after the episode "Turnabout" due to illness. In the next episode "Riddles" the reason for her not being present with the group was given that she opted to stay a few days at Coriel to help the inhabitants work out their new government and would catch up with the group later.
- Dr. Jonathan Willoway (Roddy McDowall): "Rebel scientist from the 1960s" who has a mastery of computers, robotics and scientific knowledge which is quite useful to the group. He is something of a never-entirely-trustworthy black sheep, not unlike Doctor Smith from Lost in Space but without the latter's cowardice; he often tends to do things for his own mysterious reasons. Over the course of the episodes, however, the black-clad Willoway comes to care about Scott and his fellow travelers and becomes more integrated into the group, although Fred makes no secret about still not trusting him, which leads to a bickering Spock/McCoy-style relationship between the two.
- Sil-El (The Felix Team): Liana's companion and pet, a "tuxedo cat" with which she can communicate telepathically and who sometimes scouts ahead for her, acting as an extra set of eyes and ears.

== Production ==
D. C. Fontana recalled that once the show had been commissioned, she and the producers had a very short period of time to develop and produce the show before filming commenced. Additional footage was shot and inserted into the pilot, introducing the Atlanteans, who are the focus of Episode 2. The addition of these scenes resulted in quickly moving off-screen the characters of Paul, Eve and Jill. They were originally intended to be regulars, but the network wanted a more diverse set of travelers. A subplot involving the group finding an Air Force pilot from the 1940s, held prisoner by 16th-century pirates, was removed from the first episode as well.

The character of Willoway was created with McDowall specifically in mind. The actor was interested, and took the role when it was offered.

The show benefited from more location filming than usual, with familiar sites such as the Hollywood Hills, Zuma Beach, the Bonaventure Hotel in Los Angeles, and Griffith Observatory appearing in various episodes.

Although it aired in a time when the nation's interest in the Bermuda Triangle, UFOs and fantasy was at a height, the show failed to find success. It was originally scheduled opposite The Waltons and Welcome Back, Kotter, both popular family series, as a midseason replacement for another failed fantasy show in that time slot, Gemini Man. NBC would repeatedly preempt and move the series before finally giving up on it, after only ten of the twelve episodes that the network had ordered to follow the revised pilot had been produced. The script for an eleventh episode, "Romulus", has been circulated on the Internet.

Within a few months of the abrupt end of production, several of the team that worked on the series would be producing the thematically similar Logan's Run for the 1977–1978 television season.

== Episodes ==
No.	Title	Original release date
1	"Atlantium" "Vortex"	February 3, 1977
A party of scientists disappears into the Bermuda Triangle and becomes trapped on an island where past, present and future co-exist. After meeting 23rd century healer Varian and encountering 16th century privateers, the survivors begin their quest to return to their own time. All the while, they are being observed by a mysterious man from a futuristic city in the desert.
2	"Atlantium (Part 2)"	February 10, 1977
With many of the original party returned to their own time, Varian, Scott and Fred find themselves caught up in the machinations of a megalomaniacal "brain in a box" called The Source, which has enslaved the inhabitants of the city of Atlantium (actually the Westin Bonaventure Hotel in Los Angeles), built by the survivors of the original Atlantis and intends to use Scott's life force to regenerate itself. The trio are aided by dissident Atlantean, Liana, who reveals that she is half alien.
3	"Beyond the Mountain"	February 17, 1977
The travelers are separated by a red cloud which leaves Liana as the 'guest' of Jonathan Willoway, who is the master of a utopian community of golden-garbed androids, and the others trapped in a dark swamp surrounded by shaggy, green-skinned humanoids. However, Willoway's intentions are less than honorable and he has no intention of letting Liana leave, while Fred's medical skills prove invaluable in discovering the truth.
4	"Children of the Gods"	February 24, 1977
The travelers arrive in a new Time Zone and meet a young boy who has escaped from a community inhabited solely by children led by the bullying teenager Alpha. Guest stars: Mark Lambert, Bobby Eilbacher, Cosie Costa
5	"A Dream of Conquest"	March 10, 1977
An alien dictator, Tarant, is planning to invade other Time Zones and conquer the island. Willoway pretends to agree with him so that he can learn Tarant's secrets, especially as the true leader of this alien community is being slowly poisoned by the would-be dictator. Meanwhile, Liana takes pity on an abused furry creature called the Nefring. Guest star: John Saxon
6	"An Act of Love"	March 24, 1977
Varian, under the influence of a love drug, meets a woman named Gwenith from a religious community in a geologically unstable Time Zone. His judgment impaired, Varian decides to leave the travelers to stay and marry her. He soon discovers that the community fanatically worships a volcano god called Vatticus, who demands human sacrifices.
7	"Funhouse"	March 31, 1977
Arriving at a strange, seemingly abandoned 20th century funfair, the travelers become part of a game played by an ancient Greek sorcerer named Apollonius who plans to possess Willoway's body so that he can escape his imprisonment. Guest star: Mel Ferrer
8	"Turnabout"	April 7, 1977
The travelers encounter a city where the women are subservient to brutish male authority. The women mutiny and imprison the male travelers in a strange black void, and Liana appears to join their cause. Guest star: Joan Collins
9	"Riddles"	April 21, 1977
Guided to an old house by a mysterious mounted messenger, the travelers – minus Liana – quest for an object that will assist their search for Evoland, and a strange couple conjures illusions drawn from their deepest fears. Guest star: Dale Robinette Note: The interior of the old house is the famous set of the Stephens' house in the sitcom Bewitched.
10	"The Innocent Prey"	June 16, 1977
A prison craft from Earth's future crash lands in the Time Zone where the travelers are resting, releasing two prisoners, a convicted murderer and a thief, into a community of stranded humanoid aliens that does not comprehend violence or the concept of doors and locks. With a killer on the loose scheming to abscond with an orb that gives the aliens psychokinetic powers, Varian and the others must deal with him and protect the pacifists. Guest stars: Lew Ayres, Cheryl Ladd, Richard Jaeckel, Nicholas Hammond, and Gerald McRaney Note: The opening of this episode uses flying saucer footage from the opening of the 1967 series The Invaders as the saucer approaches Earth.
