= New Blood (1999 film) =

- Directed by: Michael Hurst
- Written by: Michael Hurst
- Produced by: Jason Piette; Andy Emilio
- Starring: John Hurt; Nick Moran; Carrie-Anne Moss; Shawn Wayans; Joe Pantoliano
- Cinematography: David Pelletier
- Edited by: Michael Doherty
- Music by: Jeff Danna
- Production companies: Scanbox International; Applecreek Communications; Spice Factory Ltd.
- Distributed by: Lionsgate Films; Screenland Pictures
- Release date: 1999
- Running time: 98 minutes
- Countries: United Kingdom; Canada
- Language: English

New Blood is a 1999 Canadian-British action thriller film written and directed by Michael Hurst and starring John Hurt, Nick Moran, Carrie-Anne Moss, Shawn Wayans and Joe Pantoliano.

== Cast ==
- John Hurt as Alan White
- Nick Moran as Danny White
- Carrie-Anne Moss as Leigh
- Shawn Wayans as Valentine
- Joe Pantoliano as Hellman
- Gouchy Boy as Lawrence
- Eugene Robert Glazer as Mr. Ryan
- Richard Fitzpatrick as Lt. Caldercourt
- Alan Peterson as Frayerling
- Rob Freeman as Robert Williams
- Arthur Eng as Yin Yang
- Alex Karzis as Webster

== Reception ==
David Stratton of Variety gave the film a positive review and wrote, "It’s a convoluted setup for what’s basically a standard thriller, but thanks to persuasive performances from Hurt and, especially, Moran, it just about works."
