= Roger Steinmann =

Swiss writer, director, and businessman

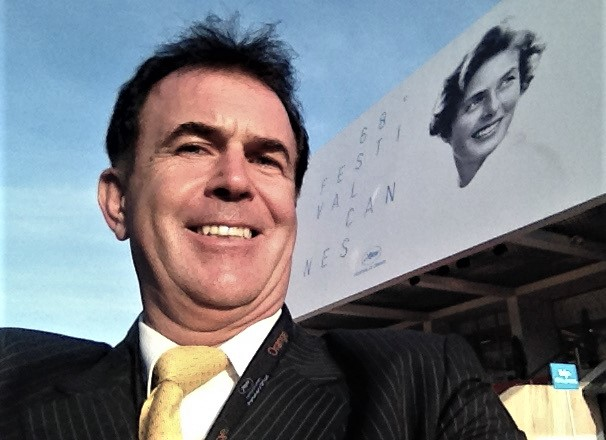
- Steinmann at the 2015 Cannes Film Festival
- Born: November 6, 1961 (age 64); Zürich, Switzerland
- Occupations: Playwriter; Theater Producer; Theater Director; Film Producer; Film Director; Screenwriter; Entrepreneur
- Years active: 1969–present
- Notable work: Ruthless; Win-Win; Illusion Infinity; PhonY; Die Flutkatastrophe (Flood Disaster); Die Maschinentiere (The Machine Animals); Die Türe (The Door)
- Website: rogersteinmann.com

Roger Steinmann (Swiss Standard German: [ˈroːɡər ˈʃtaɪnman], French: [ʁɔʒe ʃtajnman]; born November 6, 1961 in Zurich, Switzerland) is a Swiss writer, director, and entepreneur, known for his work in film and theater.

Most notable is his biopic Illusion Infinity (aka Paradise, 2004), starring Dee Wallace, Mickey Rooney, Timothy Bottoms, Barbara Carrera, Martin Kove, Theresa Saldana, and Lilyan Chauvin.

In autumn 2018, the production of the farce feature film PhonY was interrupted due to the unexpected death of lead actor Burt Reynolds. Since then, the fate of the already to 70% shot farce-comedy, with Elke Sommer and Barbara Carrera as its leading ladies, became uncertain.

Steinmann turned to the theater and created the two-character farce Win=Win as writer, director and producer. The premiere was held in Zurich on October 7, 2022. Bodo Krumwiede and Florine Elena Deplazes acted on stage; off-roles were voiced by Christa Rigozzi, Gilles Tschudi, René Rindlisbacher, Heidi Maria Glössner and Bella Neri.

Steinmann created the stage play, the 'One-Lady-Trauma' Teufelskreis, about the fate of Ruth Madoff, the wife of 65-billion dollar Ponzi-fraudster Bernard Madoff. He adapted the play into English as Ruthless - the tragic Survival of Ruth Madoff and produced the London 3 June 2025 world premiere, with a run through 29 June. Emily Swain impersonated the title role under his direction.

== Early life ==
At the age of 8, Steinmann shot his first short film with a Super-8 camera. In the next five years, another 30 films followed. Four of them received awards.

One of the early award-winning films was Die Maschinentiere (The Machine Animals), a 1977-documentary on large-scale animal husbandry in contrast to classic farming.

In Die Flutkatastrophe (The Flood Disaster) Steinmann showed the consequences of a broken dam of a nearby reservoir and the flooding of his hometown Zurich. Along an interview, it was aired on Swiss TV in November 1978, the month Steinmann turned 17.

== Career ==
Still in his teens, Steinmann aimed to execute larger scale feature-projects based on his original screenplays. In 1978/79, he developed the conception Krebs! (Cancer!) about the life-threatening virus in a woman's organism, visualized by a simultaneous life-threat of the organism of an entire city by a Godzilla-like monster-crab. In German language the title "Krebs!" bears the double meaning of Cancer and Crab.

=== Theater ===
Steinmann turned to theater as well; notable are:

1982: Beschti Referenze (aka Buchhalter Noetzli / Bookkeeper Noetzli), Steinmann in his function as producer and director was the first to bring this play by Hans Schubert to the Swiss stage. Four years later, the same play served the popular Swiss folk actor Walter Roderer as was his probably greatest success, on stage as well as in film.

1986: Achtung-Fertig-Los! (aka Nume Theater mit em Sunntigsbsuech / Ready-Steady-Go!), Steinmann producing and writing this unique farce-comedy concepting disguised actors among the real audience. His friend Markus Imthurn was directing, becoming Steinmann's closest artistic collaborator to date.

1988: Schelmereie (Sweet Cheating) at the theater in Oberentfelden, Switzerland: Steinmann directing.

=== Hollywood ===
From 1991, Steinmann lived alternatively in Los Angeles. There, he wrote several screenplays on spec, alone but mostly in association, e.g. Bum and the Kid with Scott Steindorff, outlines, e.g. Love of my Life with Don Mankiewicz, rewrites, e.g. Project: Metalbeast.

=== Illusion Infinity (aka Paradise, 2004) ===
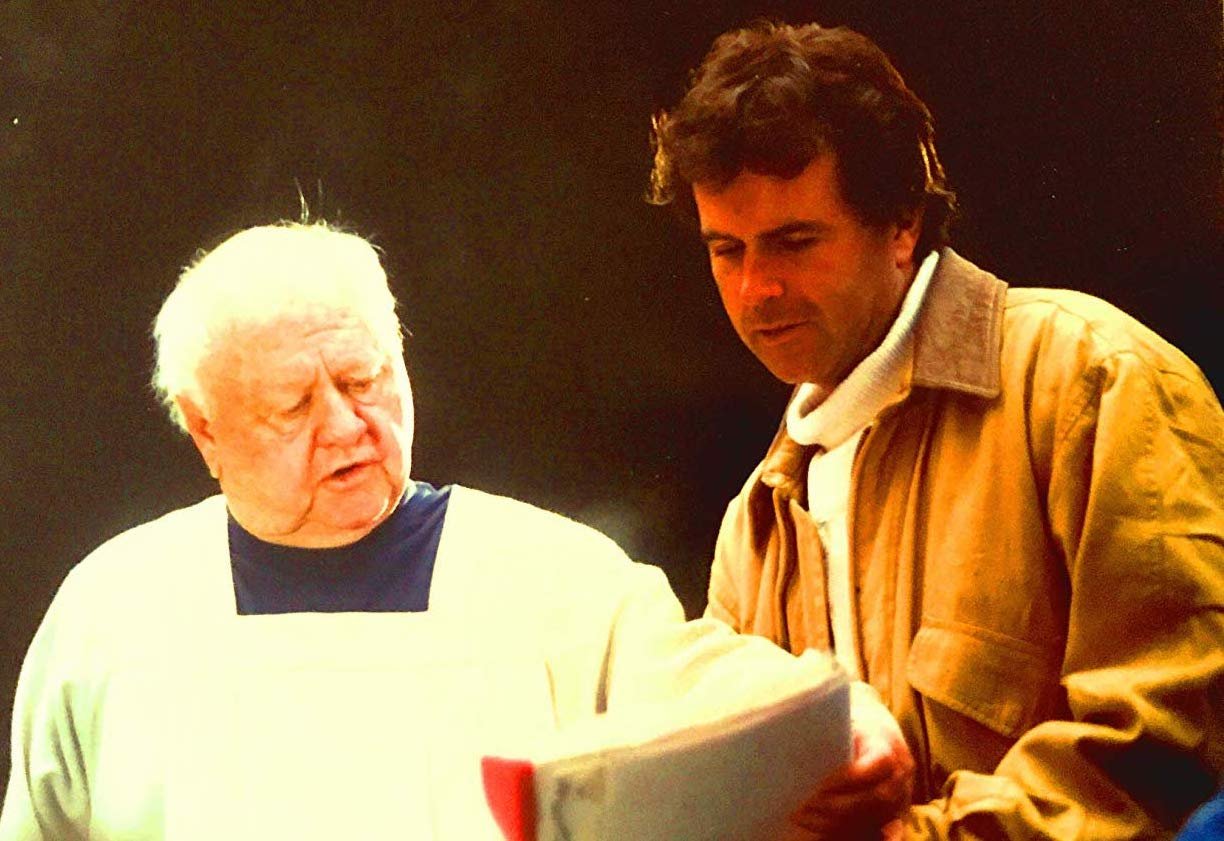
Roger Steinmann (right) directs Mickey Rooney in Illusion Infinity, Los Angeles, November 2002

Among Steinmann´s several projects, Illusion Infinity (aka Paradise, 2004) caught the eye of casting director Gerald I. Wolff. He was able to engage seven well known Hollywood actors: Dee Wallace, Mickey Rooney, Timothy Bottoms, Barbara Carrera, Martin Kove, Theresa Saldana, and Lilyan Chauvin.

Illusion Infinity was labeled as a biopic; however, it was an original screenplay by Steinmann about the supposed real Las Vegas singer Patricia Paradise (played by Dee Wallace) and her life-long search for a genuine soul-mate, and a home she calls Shangri-La.

=== The PartyKillers and Ladies First ===
In 2014, Thai film star Mike Angelo became interested to star in ‘The PartyKillers’, a screwball-comedy about a humble inventor of a magical teddy-bear crashing the engagement party of a toy manufacturer. This screenplay Steinmann wrote back in 1995/98 in collaboration with Rodney Heeringa.

But another concept of a screwball comedy fit Angelo's talent even better: A male singer gaining success only when performing as a woman, attracting both a father and his daughter. After Angelo agreed to star in this dual role, Steinmann originated the 2015-screenplay ‘Ladies First’. Swiss actors Beat Schlatter and Pascal Ulli confirmed their interest to participate, the latter also as co-produce.

=== PhonY ===
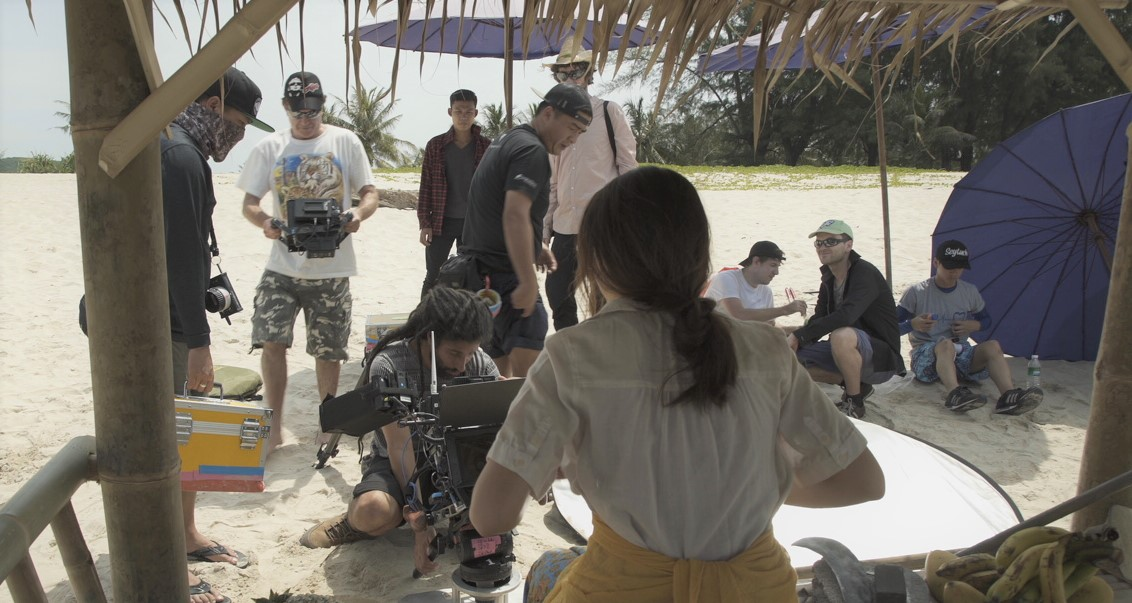
Roger Steinmann (left) on the set of 'PhonY' in Phuket/Thailand

The 2016/2018 screenplay PhonY explores what might happen if all cells and computers became unusable. It has a unique interactivity between segments based in Los Angeles, Switzerland, Australia, Thailand and Canada.

In spring 2018, the filming commenced in Switzerland with Pascal Ulli and Gilles Tschudi; it was followed by the Thai segment with a local cast. The remaining segments with Burt Reynolds, Talia Shire and Barbara Carrera were scheduled in Los Angeles for October 2018. Though, a mere month before, Reynolds untimely died, and the production stalled. Golden Globe Award winners Arnold Schwarzenegger and Elke Sommer were set for the reshoot, with Shire still on board. However, the outbreak of the COVID-19 pandemic and its restrictions once again ruined the shooting scheduled of April 2020. Since then, the fate of the feature film, shot to 70%, has become uncertain.

=== WIN=WIN ===
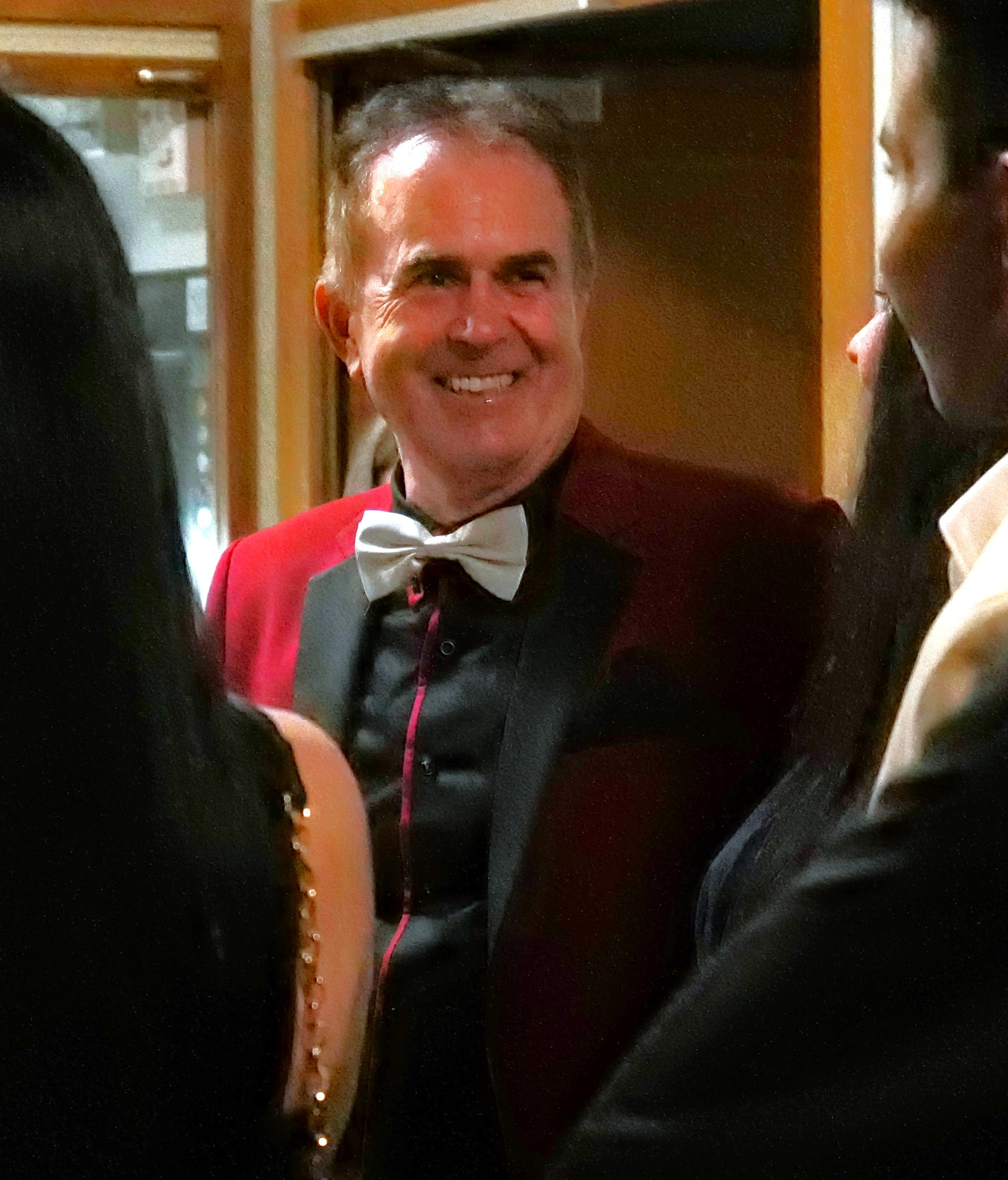
Roger Steinmann at the premiere of Win=Win, Zurich, October 7, 2022

Due to the cinematic inactivity in spring 2020, Steinmann turned after a hiatus of more than 30 years once again to the theater and created Win=Win, a two-person farce about the 'panic-stricken' distancing - aka 'social distancing' - of two very different neighbors. The stage is set up two-parted, thus the two protagonists' actions is viewed simultaneously.

Casting with Bodo Krumwiede and Florine Elena Deplazes were completed by the end of April 2022, rehearsal began at the end of June and the world premiere of Win=Win took place October 7, 2022, in Zurich.

In addition to the Swiss production, international actors such as Didi Hallervorden, and, shortly before his death Karl Dall along, for the English adaption, Timothy Bottoms, were interested in a respective national premiere

=== RUTHLESS - the tragic Survival of Ruth Madoff ===
Since 2021, Steinmann was in the works of the semi-biographical 'One-Lada-Trauma' about Ruth Madoff, the wife of 62 years of Bernie Madoff, the infamous USD 65 billion Wall Street ponzi fraudster. Her husband in jail for life, and her sons Mark and Andrew having died, one by suicide, the other by accelerated cancer - Ruth's is now all alone and destitute, as gone is her glamorous New York jet-set life. Is Ruth Madoff innocent - or guilty as complicit? Steinmann adapted the German original Teufelskreis into English as Ruthless; he produced and directed it with Emily Swain to the London world premiere on June 3, 2025, with a run through 29 June.

=== Further theater activities ===
In 2020/21, Steinmann actualized his 1986-stage play Achtung-Fertig-Los! anew in Swiss-German as Nume Theater mit em Sunnigsbsuech, and in high German as Nur Theater mit dem Sonntagsbesuch. Notably, he created an entire new development within the second act leading to a new ending of this eleven-character farce-comedy.

Since 2023, Steinmann authored Wenn der Drilling mit der Zwilling, a humorous, Agatha Christie-Witness for the Prosecution-styled crime-comedy, and as well the 'one-man satire' w. w. Steinzeit, and its English adaption w. w. Stone Age, about the near dystopian future of our digitized world.

== Other activities ==
1981: Steinmann concluded his education at the Swiss Business School in Zurich.

1983: Steinmann invented an automatic bottle stopper; patented in 1985.

1983: Steinmann prevailed in the German TV-quiz show ‘Alles oder Nichts’, winning 10'000.

1984: Steinmann founded the Rotsch AG, a joint-stock company, to market his invention. At that time, he was 22 years old and became the youngest president ever of such an entity in Switzerland. He sold that entity in 1996.

1986: Steinmann started distributing greeting cards, partly of own designing, in Switzerland but as well in Europe and throughout the world. His products were among the most luxurious on the market.

1995: Steinmann founded the film production company SUNSET International AG, a joint-stock film production company.

2009: At his home of choice in Phuket, Steinmann opened the four star boutique hotel Oasis Villa what he manages at the side.

2022: Steinmann founded the theater production company WIN WIN Productions AG.

2022: Steinmann's every day life in Phuket was aired in Europe's largest TV-station RTL in three installments within the popular German docu-series Die Alltagskämpfer.

Steinmann speaks eight languages: his original Swiss-German, German, French, English and Spanish, and has basic knowledge in Portuguese, Italian, and Thai.

== Filmography (selection) ==
=== Film ===
Year	Title	Director	Writer	Producer	Notes	Ref.
1969	Zürich	Yes	Yes	Yes	First film; Short Documentary	
1976	Die Türe	Yes	Yes	Yes	Short film; won TV-Competition, aired on Swiss TV	
1976	Die Zwei vom Klub	Yes	Yes	Yes	Short film; won Award	
1976	Die Welt steht Kopf	Yes	Yes	Yes	Short film; Experimental	
1977	Die Maschinentiere	Yes	Yes	Yes	Short Documentary; won Top-Award by Swiss Animal-Protection-Association	
1977	Die Flutkatastrophe	Yes	Yes	Yes	Short film; won Award, aired in Swiss TV	
1978	Ein Tag in der Tierarztpraxis	Yes	Yes	Yes	Short film; won Top-Award by Swiss Animal-Protection-Association	
1985	Kamera: Albert G.	No	Yes	No	Short film; Line Producer	
1987	Achtung-Fertig-Los!	No	Yes	Yes	Video	
1990	Rotsch	Yes	Yes	Yes	Commercial; Ursula Schaeppi in Dual-Role	
1995	Project: Metalbeast	No	Yes	No	Additional rewritte by Steinmann	
2004	Illusion Infinity (aka Paradise)	Yes	Yes	Yes	Starring Dee Wallace, Mickey Rooney, Timothy Bottoms, Barbara Carrera, Martin Kove, and Theresa Saldana.	
2016/20	PhonY	Yes	Yes	Yes	filming	

=== Theater (selection) ===
- 1982: Beschti Referenze (aka ‘Buchhalter Noetzli’; comedy; director and producer, premiere in Zurich June 5, 1982)
- 1986-1987: Achtung-Fertig-Los! (farce-comedy; author and producer, premiere in Zurich April 10, 1987)
- 1988: Schelmereie (comedy; director; premiere in Oberentfelden (Kanton Aargau) January 10, 1988)
- 1989: Der Zahnklempner (comedy; author; yet unproduced)
- 1990: Sturmfrei (comedy; author; yet unproduced)
- 2020: WIN=WIN (farce-comedy; author; in German; director and producer; premiere in Zurich 7.10.2022)
- 2021: Nume Theater with em Sunntigsbsuech (aka 'Nur Theater mit dem Sonntagsbesuch'; author actualization of the 1986-farce-comedy, in Swiss German as well adaption in High-German)
- 2023: Teufelskreis (drama; author)
- 2023: Ruthless (drama; author, English adaption from the German original; in preparation for a 2025-premiere in London as director and producer)
- 2024: Wenn der Drilling mit der Zwilling (crime-comedy; author)
- 2025: w.w.Steinzeit (satire; author)
- 2025: w.w.Stoneage (satire; author, Englisch adaption from the German original)
- 2026: Out Of Order (satire; author)

=== Unproduced screenplays (selection) ===
- Krebs! (1978)
- Serendipity (1991), co-written with/by James Valentine
- Bum and the Kid (1992), co-written with/by Robert Scott Steindorff, story by Steindorff
- Love of my Life (1993), co-written with/by Don Mankiewicz, story by Steinmann/Mario Gmür
- The PartyKillers (1995/2014), story with/by Rodney Heeringa, Markus Imthurn and Sidonia Held (in development)
- Ladies First (2015) (in development)
