= One Little Indian (film) =

1973 film directed by Bernard McEveety

- Theatrical release poster
- Directed by: Bernard McEveety
- Written by: Harry Spalding
- Produced by: Winston Hibler
- Starring: James Garner; Vera Miles; Pat Hingle; Clay O'Brien; John Doucette; Morgan Woodward; Andrew Prine; Jodie Foster
- Cinematography: Charles F. Wheeler
- Edited by: Robert Stafford
- Music by: Jerry Goldsmith
- Production company: Walt Disney Productions
- Distributed by: Buena Vista Distribution
- Release date: June 20, 1973
- Running time: 91 minutes
- Country: United States
- Language: English
- Box office: $2 million

One Little Indian is a 1973 American Western comedy film produced by Walt Disney Productions starring James Garner and Vera Miles. The supporting cast includes Pat Hingle, John Doucette, Morgan Woodward, Andrew Prine, as well as a young Jodie Foster. The film was written by Harry Spalding and directed by Bernard McEveety.

Garner later wrote that he was not satisfied with the project; the only aspect of the film that he appreciated was Jodie Foster, who was ten years old when the film was shot.

== Plot ==
Corporal Clint Keyes is arrested for desertion and being transported to a nearby fort by Sergeant Raines to be hung. The patrol encounters a second patrol that has captured some indians. The two groups part ways and the film focuses on the fort where a young Indian boy is encouraged by his mother Blue Feather to try to escape. While the mail is being read out Mark tries to steal a horse, creating chaos. When he is eventually captured climbing out of the fort the soldiers are shocked to learn the boy is in fact white.

The fort's commander Captain Stewart realises the boys family were no doubt killed as part of a recent Indian massacre of settlers. Chaplain John Kaplan offers to adopt the boy and Stewart agrees. John then baptises the boy as Mark. During Christmas celebrations at the fort Mark manages to escape again.

Crossing the desert Mark is accidentally shot by Clint who has also escaped and has captured 2 camels (Rosie and Thirsty). Clint patches Marks wound and decides to take the boy with him but only until he reaches the mountains. Keyes though is still being tracked by the patrol led by Sergeant Raines. Clint and Mark find an oasis where they both wash, the patrol finds the oasis and Clint ambushes the patrol removing their weapons. Raines though manages to scatter the patrol's horses. Clint sends the patrol away and continues on with Mark.

Mark and Clint encounter a widow Doris McIver and her daughter Martha. They cook dinner and afterwards Clint proposes to Doris that she takes Mark with her to Montana, she eventually agrees but only to help him find a family. Mark falls asleep and when he awakens he discovers Clint has left him. Doris offers to bring Mark with her but he declines, before he can run off Sergeant Raines appears and interrogates Doris who tries to put the patrol off. However they see through her subterfuge and they quickly pick up Clints trail.

As Doris leaves for her coach, Martha calls out to Mark who has run off to find Clint and Rosie. Clint in the meantime is being chased by Raines and the patrol. Clint manages to lose the patrol as they have continued following a riderless Rosie. Mark finds Clint and confronts him before Clint agrees to show Mark how to find the Indians he craves. Raines then captures Clint and returns him to the fort where the soldiers are constructing a gallows.

Captain Stewart returns to the fort and spots the gallows. He calls Raines and rebukes him. Clint is brought before Stewart where he explains that during a raid his patrol started executing women and children and he then struck a soldier to stop the massacre resulting in the general ordering his hanging. Stewart then orders Raines to complete the hanging but without any soldiers from the fort. Clint asks Chaplain John to look after Mark if the army finds him. He suggests placing Mark with Doris and Martha and the Chaplain agrees.

Just as Clint is to be hung, Mark arrives and he creates a distraction by causing a stampede of the fort's cattle. This wrecks the gallows and allows Clint to grab Rosie and race free. Mark though is captured. Raines manages to shoot and mortally wound Rosie but Clint escapes. Stewart at the fort declines Raines request for more horses and tells the sergeant that his orders have been carried out as Clint was indeed hung as per Raines' orders. The chaplain then finds Clint and informs him that he is a free man. Now he is free the chaplain offers Mark to him and he agrees to adopt the boy.

Mark is sad to see Rosie has died but happy Clint has agreed to adopt him. Clint agrees to bring the boy to see Blue Feather.

== Cast ==
- James Garner as Corporal Clint Keyes
- Vera Miles as Doris McIver
- Pat Hingle as Captain Stewart
- Clay O'Brien as Mark
- John Doucette as Sergeant Waller
- Morgan Woodward as Sergeant Raines
- Andrew Prine as Chaplain John Kaplan
- Robert Pine as Lieutenant Cummins
- Bruce Glover as Schrader
- Ken Swofford as Private Dixon
- Jay Silverheels as Jimmy Wolf
- Jodie Foster as Martha McIver
- Walter Brooke as The Doctor
- Rudy Diaz as The Apache
- John C. Flinn III as Cowboy (as John Flinn)
- Lois Red Elk as Blue Feather
- Hal Baylor as Branigan
- Terry Wilson as Stagecoach
- Paul Sorensen as The Guard
- Read Morgan as Reb
- Richard Hale as Old Indian
- Jim Davis as Trail Boss

== Production ==
Parts of the film were shot in Kanab Canyon, the Gap, Kanab movie fort, and the Coral Pink Sand Dunes in Utah.

== Reception ==
The film earned an estimated $2 million in North American rentals.
