= Xenia Gratsos =

Greek-American actress (1940–2018)

- Xenia Grastos (as Brioni Farrell) in Death Valley Days, 1970
- Born: February 12, 1940; Greece
- Died: August 8, 2018 (aged 78)
- Other name: Brioni Farrell
- Occupation: Actress
- Years active: 1966—1999
- Known for: The Return of the Archons; General Hospital; The Student Nurses
- Spouse: Eugene Robert Glazer (m. 1991)
- Children: 2
- Relatives: Katina Paxinou (grandaunt)

Xenia Gratsos (February 12, 1940 – August 8, 2018) was a Greek-American actress who worked both in film and on stage, under the name Brioni Farrell. She was born in Greece and moved to the United States to pursue her acting career. She had a long career with multiple roles in U.S. television and film. She lived in southern California with her husband, actor Eugene Robert Glazer. Following troubling signs in 2006, she was diagnosed with early-onset Alzheimer's disease in 2007; she died in 2018, from complications associated with the disease.

== Personal life ==
Gratsos met her future husband Eugene Glazer in Milton Katselas' acting class in 1979. An animal lover, Gratsos was reported to have on one occasion collected 18 sheltered animals. Despite her and Glazer having ambitions of retiring to Greece, they never fulfilled this goal. Due to ongoing health problems related to Alzheimer's disease, she and Glazer would instead opt to live out her final years in a skilled nursing facility. After a 12 year battle with Alzheimer's disease, Farrell succumbed to complications of the disease on August 8, 2018. She has two sons.

== Filmography ==
Except where noted, was credited as Brioni Farrell.

=== Film ===
Year	Title	Role	Notes
1970	The Student Nurses	Lynn	
1974	Hell River	Anna Kleitz	
1983	My Tutor	Mrs. Fontana	credit misspelled as Brioni Farrel
1985	Appointment with Fear	Mrs. Sorenson	credit misspelled as Brioni Farrel
1992	Round Trip to Heaven	Melanie	
1995	Project Metalbeast	Dr. Barnes	

=== Television ===
Year	Title	Role	Notes
1966	The Man from U.N.C.L.E.	Mia Corragio	Episode: "The Deadly Goddess Affair"
1966	Run for Your Life	Michelle	Episode: "The Rediscovery of Charlotte Hyde"
1966–1968	Bonanza	Regina Rossi	3 episodes
1967	Star Trek: The Original Series	Tula	Episode: "The Return of the Archons"
1967	The Wild Wild West	Voulee	Episode: "The Night of the Brain"
1967, 1968	Death Valley Days	Jenny Bartlett / Sue / Waa-Nibe	3 episodes
1968	Mission: Impossible	January	Episode: "The Town"
1968	The Rat Patrol	Felicia	Episode: "The Tug of War Raid"
1968	Daniel Boone	Louise	Episode: "The Fleeing Nuns"
1968	Family Affair	Lucianna	Episode: "Ciao, Uncle Bill"
1969	Lancer	Laurie	Episode: "The Wedding"
1970	To Rome with Love	Margot	Episode: "Here Comes Andy"
1971	Allan	Alice	Television film
1971	Bearcats!	Sally Todd	Episode: "The Return of Estaban"
1973	The Rookies	Kathy	Episode: "Crossfire" (credited as Xenia Gratsos)
1973	The Bait	Denise	Television film (credited as Xenia Gratsos)
1973	Search	Zuhra Sinjar	Episode: "The Packagers" (credited as Xenia Gratsos)
1975	Columbo	Xenia	Episode: "A Case of Immunity" (credited as Xenia Gratsos)
1975	Police Story	Kersey	Episode: "Test of Brotherhood" (credited as Xenia Gratsos)
1977	The Bionic Woman	Ezelda	Episode: "Jaime and the King"
1978	Keefer	Beaujolais	Television film
1979	The Next Step Beyond	Cathy LeMasters	Episode: "To Fight a Ghost"
1982	The Devlin Connection	Angelique	Episode: "The French Detective"
1981-1984	General Hospital	Martha, waitress at Kelly's	25 episodes
1985	Night Heat	Margaret Davis	Episode: "Deadline"
1985	The Hitchhiker	Darlene	Episode: "W.G.O.D."
1987	Tales from the Darkside	Amanda Caine	Episode: "Red Leader"
1987	Hoover vs. The Kennedys	Judith Exner	2 episodes
1989	Street Legal	Eileen Gray	Episode: "Home"
1991	Dallas	Alice Ann	Episode: "Conundrum"
1999	La Femme Nikita	Renee	Episode: "Hand to Hand"
