= Lamar Card =

American film director and producer

- Born: Lamar Card; September 8, Chattanooga
- Occupation(s): Film director, Film producer
- Years active: 1973–today

Lamar Card is an American film producer, film director and assistant film director. He is the CEO of the production company "Card International Motion Picture Corporation".

== Filmography ==
- Flamingo Dreams (2000, director)
- Shadow Warriors (1995, director)
- Project Metalbeast (1995, executive producer)
- Resort to Kill (1994, executive producer)
- The JFK Assassination: The Jim Garrison Tapes (1992, co-executive producer)
- Blood of Others (1984, executive producer)
- Heart Like a Wheel (1983, executive producer)
- Savage Harvest (1981, co-producer)
- Disco Fever (1978, director, producer)
- Supervan (1977, director)
- Nashville Girl (1976, associate producer)
- The Swinging Barmaids (1975, associate producer)
- The Clones (1973, co-director, executive producer)
