= Bounty Tracker =

1993 film

- Directed by: Kurt Anderson
- Written by: Caroline Olson
- Produced by: Pierre David
- Starring: Lorenzo Lamas, Matthias Hues
- Cinematography: Ken Arlidge
- Edited by: Michael Thibault
- Music by: Richard Bowers
- Distributed by: Ascot Video, Multicom Entertainment Group
- Release date: September 8, 1993
- Running time: 86 minutes
- Country: United States
- Language: English

Bounty Tracker is a 1993 direct-to-video action film starring Lorenzo Lamas and Matthias Hues. It was directed by Kurt Anderson.

== Plot ==
In a Boston bar, ex-cop Johnny Damone, now a bounty hunter, fights with and captures a wanted man, Harold Kingston, to collect a bounty of $50,000 from the police. In a Tax office, gunmen kill everyone except Johnny Damone's brother, Paul Damone, who escapes and is considered to be a key witness to put the gangsters behind bars. Johnny visits Paul at his home, but is unable to stop the gangsters from killing both Paul and his wife Isabelle.

Erik Gauss is the leader of the gang, and Johnny would like to get help from police to catch him, but can't since it's a sensitive high-profile case. Jewels, the lawyer of the gang, sees an outlaw Sarazin in jail and negotiates a million dollar deal in diamonds for his release.

Johnny recognizes a tattoo of a knife and a snake during the massacre at his brother's residence, and starts visiting tattoo parlors, and finally gets the address of a man in a wheelchair, Alberto Manuel. While at Manuel's place enquiring about Gauss, Johnny observes a picture showing Paso Dyak, Indonesian martial arts. Johnny then goes to a Paso Dyak martial arts Dojo to question them about Gauss, who is tipped off by the master there. A fight ensues, and Johnny defeats the students as well as the Master Kuto, but is wounded in the process. Jewels tries to shoot Johnny as he is bandaging his wounds, but he escapes and is taken into custody by the cops, who let him go after interrogating him.

Jewels informs Gauss about Alberto Manuel, who is killed by Gauss after questioning. Manuel's student Tony arrives and hears him yell "Gauss" before dying. Tony rounds up a few of his buddies to take down Johnny, but he convinces them that he's also interested in taking down Gauss. Johnny goes to a bar and asks questions, before being beaten up and then rescued by Tony. They manage to get the location of Gauss's hideout.

Sarazin is released from jail and visits Gauss. Tony's friend Tiny gets into the trunk of Sarazin's car, with Johnny in distant pursuit, listening to Tiny's instructions over a radio. They pull into a junkyard, just as Jewels and Gauss receive a million in diamonds from Sarazin. Gauss and Jewels kill Sarazin and his driver, but Johnny kills Gauss and Jewels and frees Tiny.

Johnny places flowers on Paul and Isabella's graves and says goodbye to Tony and Tiny.

== Cast ==
Actor	Role
Lorenzo Lamas	Johnny Damone
Matthias Hues	Erik Gauss
Cyndi Pass	Jewels
Eric Mansker	Ramses
Brooks Gardner	Max Talton
Eugene Robert Glazer	Luis Sarazin
Judd Omen	Alberto Manuel
Eddie Frias	Tony
George Perez	Tiny
Whip Hubley	Detective Ralston
Paul Regina	Paul Damone
Steve Cohen	Alec
Alisa Christensen	Isabelle Damone
Leo Lee	Kuto
Ray Laska	Torrelli
Ken Ober	Marty Silk
Marty Dudek	Wendy
Christopher Kriesa	Grey
Anthony Peck	Greco

== Reception ==
TV Guide said, "Despite its busy script, BOUNTY TRACKER never gives way to confusion or loses its momentum in expository details. More concerned with visceral action than suspense, the film is a valid showcase for Lamas' athletic prowess."

The film was internationally distributed, for example in Germany as Head Hunter and in Italy as Poliziotto a Los Angeles The film's martial art scenes were generally noted as one of its key features.
