= Flood Disaster =

1977 Swiss short disaster film

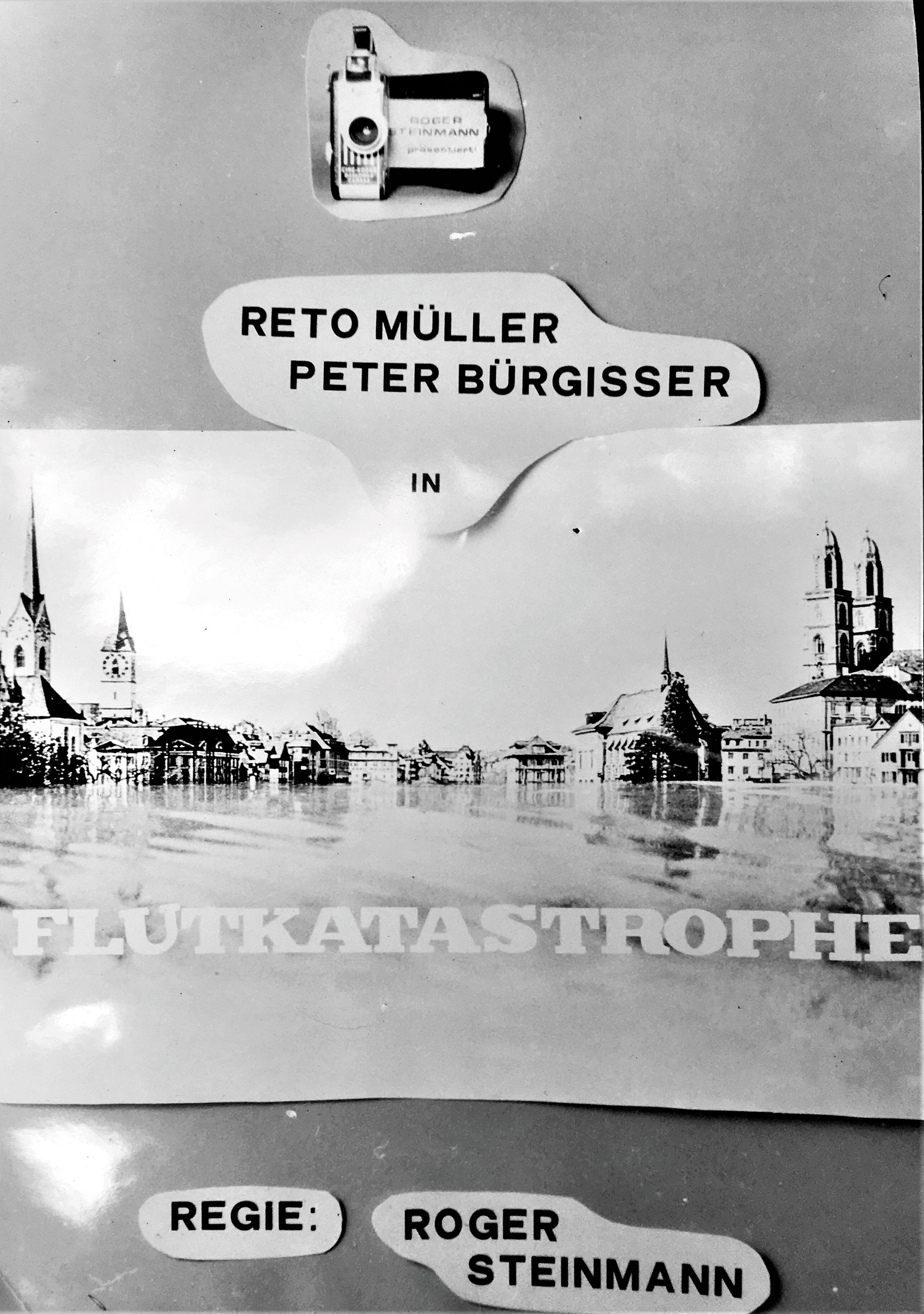
- First poster of Flood Disaster (original title of Flutkatastrophe)
- Directed by: Roger Steinmann
- Written by: Roger Steinmann
- Produced by: Roger Steinmann
- Starring: Reto Müller, Peter Bürgisser
- Cinematography: Roger Steinmann
- Edited by: Roger Steinmann
- Music by: Maurice Jarre (courtesy from Doctor Zhivago)
- Release date: 17 September 1977
- Running time: 14 minutes
- Country: Switzerland
- Language: Swiss German
- Budget: CHF 200 - 400

Flood Disaster (German original title Flutkatastrophe) is a 1977 Swiss short by Roger Steinmann. The film was labeled "Switzerland's first disaster movie" as depicting a major water dam-break with the subsequent flooding of the metropole of Zurich.

== Background ==
The 1937 installed dam created Switzerland largest artificial lake, the Sihlsee. A failure of the dam could lead, according to studies, to an 8-metre (26 ft) high flood wave through the lower Sihl Valley reaching the Altstadt of the city of Zurich, the biggest city in Switzerland, within 2 hours. This threat has led the City of Zurich to develop, publish and test evacuation plans for the affected areas of the city, and especially the area around Zürich Hauptbahnhof railway station.

== Production ==
15-year high school-student Roger Steinmann was inspired by Zurich's frequent test-alarms in case of a dam-break. With already several years of filming experience in 1977, he realized the "would-be" situation of a catastrophe due to an earthquake.

Some music was borrowed from Doctor Zhiwago, and some sound from Earthquake.

Steinmann cast one lead-role with his class-mate, the future mathematic-professor Peter Bürgisser.

== Accolades ==
At the second Swiss Youth Filmfestival (Schweizerischen Jugendfilmtagen) 1977, the film won the first prize. For its editing, it won the Silver Scissors by the Union International of Film Amateurs in 1978. Together with an interview with filmmaker Steinmann and lead actor Bürgisser, the film was aired on Swiss national TV on Nov 4, 1978.
