= Morgan Woodward =

American actor (1925–2019)

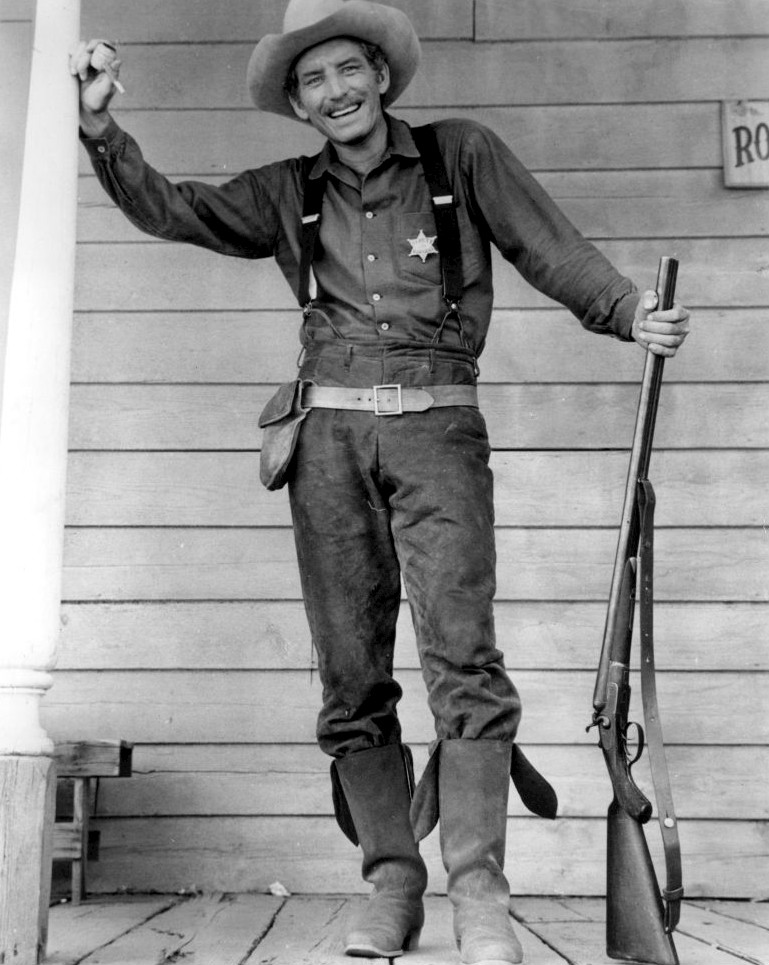
- Woodward as "Shotgun" Gibbs on The Life and Legend of Wyatt Earp, 1959
- Born: Thomas Morgan Woodward; September 16, 1925; Fort Worth, Texas, U.S.
- Died: February 22, 2019 (aged 93); Los Angeles, California, U.S.
- Resting place: Arlington Cemetery, Arlington, Texas, U.S.
- Education: University of Texas at Austin; University of Texas at Arlington
- Occupation: Actor
- Years active: 1956–1998
- Spouse: Enid Anne Loftis (1950–2019, his death)
- Children: 1
- Military career
- Allegiance: United States
- Branch: United States Army Air Forces; United States Air Force
- Service years: 1944–1952
- Unit: Military Air Transport Command
- Conflicts: World War II; Korean War

Thomas Morgan Woodward (September 16, 1925 – February 22, 2019) was an American actor who is best known for his recurring role as Marvin "Punk" Anderson on the television soap opera Dallas and for his portrayal of Boss Godfrey, the sunglasses-wearing "man with no eyes", in the 1967 film Cool Hand Luke. On TV, he was a familiar guest star on cowboy shows. On the long-running Western Gunsmoke, he played 16 different characters in 19 episodes (including a pair of two-part stories), most appearances of any actor on the show. He also had a recurring role on The Life and Legend of Wyatt Earp.

== Early years ==
Woodward was born in Fort Worth, Texas, the third of five sons of Dr. Valin Woodward and his wife, Frances McKinley. He grew up in Arlington, Texas, graduating from high school in 1944. After serving in the U.S. Army Air Corps during World War II, he enrolled at North Texas Agriculture College, where he was active in the theater. He graduated in 1948 with a Bachelor's of Business Administration in Finance. He attended law school at the University of Texas at Austin. During that time, he hosted a local radio talk show and sang with a barbershop quartet and a dance band.

== Military service ==
Woodward was a member of the United States Army Air Force during World War II. He flew his first plane at the age of 16. He returned to the military during the Korean War with the now-Military Air Transport Service.

== Acting career ==
=== Westerns ===
One of Woodward's longest television roles was in 42 episodes from 1958 to 1961 on the ABC television series The Life and Legend of Wyatt Earp as the deputy/sidekick "Shotgun" Gibbs. Woodward made a dozen guest appearances on Wagon Train between 1958 and 1965, and many appearances in Gunsmoke, Rawhide, and Bonanza.

In the 1966 episode "Hugh Glass Meets the Bear" of the syndicated anthology series, Death Valley Days, Woodward was cast as Thomas "Broken Hand" Fitzpatrick. John Alderson played Hugh Glass, who, after being mauled by a bear and abandoned by Fitzpatrick, crawled 200 miles to civilization. Victor French portrayed Louis Baptiste, with Tris Coffin as Major Andrew Henry.

Woodward also played on The Waltons as Boone Walton, the nephew of Walton's grandfather, Zeb Walton, and the son of Zeb's eldest brother, Henry.

=== Star Trek ===
Woodward guest-starred in two episodes of the original series of Star Trek as two different characters. In the first-season episode, "Dagger of the Mind" (1966), Woodward plays Dr. Simon van Gelder, a deputy director of a facility for the criminally insane. Later, he was cast in "The Omega Glory" in Star Trek's second season, playing Captain Ron Tracey. Woodward called the role of Dr. Simon Van Gelder the most physically and emotionally exhausting acting job of his career.

=== Dallas ===
Woodward was a familiar face on the television drama series Dallas from 1980 to 1987. His recurring role was Marvin "Punk" Anderson. As the series progressed, Woodward's role became that of a trusted advisor to the Ewing sons.

== Recording ==
In 1963, Woodward recorded "Heartache City" backed with "An Encouraging Word" (CRC Charter 15).

== Death ==
Woodward died at age 93 on February 22, 2019, at his Hollywood Hills house in California.

== Recognition ==
In 2009, Woodward was inducted into the Hall of Great Western Performers at the National Cowboy & Western Heritage Museum. In 1986, he was inducted into the Order of West Range of Pi Kappa Alpha fraternity.

In 1988, he received the Golden Lariat Award at the National Western Film Festival for his contributions to the Western genre. He won the Golden Boot Award given by the Hollywood Motion Picture and Television Fund.

== Selected filmography ==
Woodward appeared in more than 250 television shows and films throughout his acting career.

=== Films ===
- The Great Locomotive Chase (1956) - Alex
- Westward Ho, the Wagons! (1956) - Obie Foster
- Slaughter on Tenth Avenue (1957) - Tilly Moore (uncredited)
- Gunsight Ridge (1957) - Tex - Lazy Heart Ranch Hand
- Ride a Crooked Trail (1958) - Durgan (uncredited)
- The Gun Hawk (1963) - Deputy "Mitch" Mitchell
- The Devil's Bedroom (1964)
- The Sword of Ali Baba (1965) - Captain of Guard
- Gunpoint (1966) - Drago Leon
- Cool Hand Luke (1967) - Boss Godfrey
- Firecreek (1968) - Willard
- Death of a Gunfighter (1969) - Ivan Stanek
- The Wild Country (1970) - Ab Cross
- Yuma (1971, TV Movie) - Arch King
- One Little Indian (1973) - Sgt. Raines
- Running Wild (1973) - Crug Crider
- The Midnight Man (1974) - Phillip Clayborne
- Ride in a Pink Car (1974) - Jeff Richman
- The Killing of a Chinese Bookie (1976) - The Boss
- A Small Town in Texas (1976) - C.J. Crane
- Supervan (1977) - T.B. Trenton
- Moonshine County Express (1977) - Sweetwater
- Walking Tall: Final Chapter (1977) - The Boss
- Speedtrap (1977) - Capt. Hogan
- Which Way Is Up? (1977) - Mr. Mann
- The Other Side of Hell (1978, TV Movie) – Johnson
- Battle Beyond the Stars (1980) - Cayman
- Girls Just Want to Have Fun (1985) - J.P. Sands
- Dark Before Dawn (1988) - J.B. Watson
- Gunsmoke: To the Last Man (1992, TV Movie) - Sheriff Abel Rose

=== TV appearances ===
Woodward made many other television guest appearances, including:

- Gunsmoke (1957–1974: 19 episodes) - Abraham Wakefield / Bear Sanderson / Lamoor Underwood / Walt Clayton / Luke Dangerfield / Quentin Sargent / Josh Stryker / Luke Brazo / Grant Lyle / Harl Townsend / Zack Johnson / Beaumont / Earl Miller / Ben Rucker / Sholo / Deeks / Calhoun
- Tales of Wells Fargo (1957, 1961: 2 episodes) - Phil Slavin / Steve Taggart
- The Restless Gun (1958–1959: 3 episodes) - J.B. Cauter / Jubal Carney / Ben Cotterman
- Wagon Train (1958–1965: 12 episodes) - Clyde / Zach Ryker / Jute Pardee / Pocky / Ciel / Second Killer / Barney / Walt Keene / Chief Spotted Horse / Jubal Ash / Jupe / Ben Lafferty
- The Life and Legend of Wyatt Earp (1958–1961: 80 episodes) - Shotgun Gibbs
- Bat Masterson (1960) - Kana in S2.E35, "The Big Gamble"
- Bonanza (1960–1971: 8 episodes) - Sheriff Clyde Morehouse / Jess Waddle / Will McNabb / Luke Catlin / Mike Gillis / McDermott / Deputy Sheriff Rick Conley / Sheriff Biggs
- The Asphalt Jungle (1961) - Detective Kertz
- Perry Mason (1962) - Carl Pedersen
- Daniel Boone (1965: 2 episodes) - Tom Sutton in S1.E16, "The First Stone" / Elisha Tully in S2.E14, "The Christmas Story"
- The Lucy Show (1966) - Pierce, a cowboy with John Wayne
- Star Trek (1966, 1968: 2 episodes) – Dr. Simon van Gelder in S1.E9, "Dagger of the Mind" / Captain Tracey in S2.E23, "The Omega Glory"
- The High Chaparral (1970) - Billings
- Kung Fu (1973–1974: 2 episodes) - Col. Binns / The Hanged Man a.k.a. The Adversary
- Planet of the Apes (1974) - Martin the blacksmith
- The Waltons (1974, 1978: 2 episodes) - Boone Walton
- Logan's Run (1977–1978: 3 episodes) - Morgan
- How the West Was Won (1978–1979: 4 episodes) - The Stranger / Henry Coe
- Fantasy Island (1979–1982, 4 episodes) - Uncle Jack / Nick Hall / Tribal Elder / Marshall Victor Grennan
- The Dukes of Hazzard' (1980, 1984: 2 episodes) - Dempsey in S2.E21, "Mason Dixon's Girls" / Cassius Claiborne in S7.E7, "Cool Hands, Luke & Bo"
- Dallas (1980–1987: 55 episodes) - Marvin "Punk" Anderson (oilman and best friend of Jock Ewing)
- Hill Street Blues (1982: 5 episodes) - John Renko
- The Fall Guy (1982, 1985: 2 episodes) - LV Vernon / Reuben
- The A-Team (1983, 1984: 2 episodes) - Bus Carter in S2.E5–6, "When You Comin' Back, Range Rider?" / Captain Winnetka in S3.E9, "Showdown!")
- Days of Our Lives (1987–1988: 20 episodes) - Phillip Colville
- Renegade (1993) - Dad Meechum in S1.E16, "Billy"
- The X-Files (1995) - Old Harry Cokely in S2.E12, "Aubrey"
- Millennium (1997) - Iron Lung Man (final appearance)
