= Project Metalbeast =

Project Metalbeast: DNA Overload
- Directed by: Alessandro De Gaetano
- Written by: Roger Steinmann; Timothy E. Sabo; Alessandro De Gaetano
- Produced by: Frank Hildebrand; Timothy E. Sabo/Michael Carazza (co-producer); Steve Gellman (co-associate producer); Barbara Javitz (associate producer); Lamar Card/Barry L. Collier/Penny Karlin (executive producer)
- Starring: Barry Bostwick; Kane Hodder; Kim Delaney; Musetta Vander
- Cinematography: Thomas L. Callaway
- Edited by: Kert Vandermeulen
- Music by: Conrad Pope
- Distributed by: Prism Pictures/C/FP Video/Blue Ridge Entertainment
- Release date: 1995
- Running time: 92 minutes
- Country: United States
- Language: English

Project Metalbeast, also known as Project Metalbeast: DNA Overload in the United States and Metalbeast in the United Kingdom, is a 1995 science fiction horror film directed by Alessandro De Gaetano and filmed in the United States. In this movie, a group of scientists attempt to create a perfect soldier by injecting the subject with the blood of a werewolf. When the experiment goes wrong, the subject is cryogenically frozen for 20 years. The only member of the original team to survive is a Colonel, who gives the victim a synthetic skin to create a metal-skinned killing machine.

== Story ==
In 1974, an ambitious special ops soldier named Donald Butler investigates an island castle protected by a vicious, man-eating werewolf. Sacrificing his cameraman, Don takes the opportunity to kill the beast with silver bullets before taking a large sample of its blood and taking it to Washington for investigation for a possible serum to produce super soldiers from the werewolf's blood under the supervision of Colonel Miller. Butler soon grows impatient and irritated that most of the blood he collected was used up with no results. Taking matters into his own hands, Butler injects himself with the last of the blood directly. Soon, his senses grow acute. He is able to see, hear, and smell better than any human. Unable to control his newly animalistic nature, Butler soon goes berserk, raping the hematologist responsible for the blood before transforming into a werewolf himself and killing another staff member before Miller kills him with three silver bullets to the chest. Clinically dead, Miller orders a witness murdered and hides Butler's body, cryogenically freezing it. Without the bullets, Butler would be very much alive.

Twenty years have passed. Scientists investigate possible mass-skin replacement alternatives, synthesizing prosthetic skin with a metal alloy as a base. Though they are having trouble stabilizing it without it turning hard as steel, they are approached by Miller, who offers them human corpses as subjects. Initially hesitant about using the bodies, the head scientist Anna De Carlo and her superior General Hammond find they have no choice and will face having their funds cut off if they refuse to cooperate. As Anne and her team Larry, Roger, and her love interest Philip Ferraro are given the body of Butler to work on. They suspect something is amiss, as the body has no name, no origin that they have access to. When they are nearly completed with the transfusion of the metallic skin, which appears to be successful so far, leaving only bits of skin left, including the patch over his heart, they find the bullets lodged into his heart and remove them. Immediately, the body comes alive, and the situation becomes a moral issue for Anne and her team. When Miller refuses to collaborate his information and Anna and her team refuse to complete the project on a living man, Miller instigates the scattered memories of Butler through photographs, causing him to relapse and turn into his former werewolf self again and kill Larry.

Meanwhile, Anna gets her friend Debbie to manufacture a key card to investigate Miller's story more by breaking into his office, and she finds the gun used on Butler 20 years earlier. After discovering Larry's death and seeing the now half-formed werewolf that Butler has become, they attempt to reverse the process, only to find that the grafted skin has solidified. When Anne and Ferraro leave, Butler transforms again, killing Roger, who was left behind to sedate him.

Now loose, the new Metalbeast begins to kill off the doctors and soldiers in the hospital. In order to prevent him from getting out, Anne, Ferraro, and Debbie lock down the facility, trapping themselves inside with the beast. Miller incapacitates Hammond to slow down the beast, and he shoots Ferraro, who allows the girls to get away with silver-tipped rockets they had made to kill Butler. Anna and Debbie find the cryogenics lab used to keep Butler on ice for twenty years, but when Miller comes upon them the beast, instead of being grateful for Miller keeping him "alive" for so long, Butler kills him, and debris from a missed rocket shot knocks Debbie out, forcing Anne to run from the Metalbeast. After a short game of cat-and-mouse, Anna holds off the beast long enough for Debbie to take a shot at the beast, injuring it with a shot to the leg that did not explode. As all hope seems lost, Ferraro, having recovered from the gunshot to his shoulder, steps in and reloads the bazooka. Anna fires the final rocket into the beast's chest, causing him to blow apart. As they leave the facility, they recall how unbelievable the story will be but agree they should tell people about it before Anna and Ferraro kiss.

As they leave, a piece of the beast starts to move, indicating it can regenerate itself from just a small piece of tissue.

== Cast ==
Actor / Actress	Character
Kim Delaney	Anna De Carlo
Barry Bostwick	Colonel Peter Alexander Miller
Kane Hodder	MetalBeast
Musetta Vander	Debbie
John Marzilli	Donald Butler
Dean Scofield	Philip Ferraro
Tim Duquette	Roger
Lance Slaughter	Larry
Tom Hillmann	Agent Berger
Brioni Farrell	Dr. Barnes
Chuck Picerni Jr.	Turner
William G. Clark	General Leslie Hammond
Carol Davis	Michelle
Brian Brophy	Dr. Taylor
Mario Burgos	Chef Ramon
T.J. Castronovo	Oarsman
Michael T. Swenor	Cpl. Williams
David Sessions	Lyons
Glen Robinson	Johnson
Diaunte	Evans

== Home media ==
Project Metalbeast had its first DVD release on 16 June 2020, with mostly negative reviews due to being from a poor VHS transfer with some audio issues and a lack of special features.
