= Eugene Robert Glazer =

American actor

- Born: December 16, 1942 (age 83); Brooklyn, New York, US
- Occupation: Actor
- Notable work: La Femme Nikita
- Spouse: Xenia Gratsos (m. 1991; died 2018)

Eugene Robert Glazer (born December 16, 1942, in Brooklyn, New York) is an American actor best known for his portrayal of "Operations" on the USA Network series La Femme Nikita. Glazer was raised in Brooklyn, New York, and worked at a variety of jobs before moving to Los Angeles in the 1970s to pursue his acting career. He worked in live theater and starred in a number of television and movie roles before being cast on La Femme Nikita. He was married to late actress Xenia Gratsos, who joined him on La Femme Nikita as Renee in the 3rd season episode "Hand to Hand".

== Filmography ==
=== Film ===
Year	Title	Role	Notes
1979	Parts: The Clonus Horror	Guide #2	
1984	The City Girl	The Man in Hotel	
1984	Joy of Sex	Dr. Fox	
1986	Vendetta	David Greene	
1986	Hunter's Blood	Harris	
1987	Hollywood Shuffle	Director / Teacher / Amadeus	
1987	No Way Out	C.I.D. Man	
1988	I'm Gonna Git You Sucka	Officer	
1989	Intruder	Danny	
1989	Harlem Nights	Detective Hogan	
1991	Eve of Destruction	Buddy #2	
1991	The Five Heartbeats	David Green	
1991	Stepping Out	Frank	
1991	Dollman	Captain Shuller	
1993	Bounty Tracker	Luis Sarazin	
1993	The Substitute	Ben Wyatt	
1995	Scanner Cop II	Institute Director	
1996	It's My Party	Jim Bixby	
1996	Skyscraper	Cranston	
1999	New Blood	Mr. Ryan	
2010	Reunited	Dr. Harrington	

=== Television ===
Year	Title	Role	Notes
1978	Quincy, M.E.	Officer Keefer	Episode: "A Test for Living"
1980	Charlie's Angels	Marty	Episode: "Homes $weet Homes"
1981	Hill Street Blues	Art Show Suitor	Episode: "Blood Money"
1983	T. J. Hooker	Parker	Episode: "The Shadow of Truth"
1984	Whiz Kids	Lt. Kaster	Episode: "Amen to Amen-Re"
1984	Falcon Crest	Jim Parker	Episode: "The Avenger"
1987	Sledge Hammer!	Johnny 'Red Shoes' Haggis	Episode: "A Clockwork Hammer"
1987	The Judge	Mr. Morgan	Episode: "Fetal Abuse"
1988	Night Heat	Lou Anton	Episode: "Jumper"
1989	The Twilight Zone	Michael Stephens	Episode: "Father and Son Game"
1989	War of the Worlds	Marcus Crane	Episode: "Loving the Alien"
1990	Dallas	Phil Rogers	Episode: "Paradise Lost"
1990	Counterstrike	Scott	Episode: "Cinema Verite"
1990–1993	E.N.G.	Tom Kennedy / Eino Molle	9 episodes
1991	Street Legal	Dr. Paul Wineberg	Episode: "Eye of the Beholder"
1991, 1992	Tropical Heat	Colt / Garrity	2 episodes
1992, 1993	Dark Justice	Sapperstein	2 episodes
1993	Counterstrike	Morris	Episode: "Muerta"
1993	Top Cops	John McCarthy	Episode: "Stephen Marshall/John McCarthy/ Irving Robinson"
1993	Kung Fu: The Legend Continues	Jason Torrence	Episode: "Reunion"
1993	Secret Service	Moratto / Ray	2 episodes
1994	Walker, Texas Ranger	FBI Agent Tom Sanders	Episode: "The Legend of Running Bear"
1996	Golden Will: The Silken Laumann Story	Mr. Laumann	Television film
1996	F/X: The Series	Gary Castle	Episode: "Supernote"
1997	A Prayer in the Dark	John Dolan	Television film
1997–2001	La Femme Nikita	Operations / Paul L. Wolfe	96 episodes
1999	Night Man	Lucien Orcus	Episode: "Revelations"
1999	Loving Evangeline	Grant Shaw	Television film
2003	Mutant X	Nicholas Fox	Episode: "Lest He Become"
2003	24	Alexander Trepkos	2 episodes
2004	The Division	Charles Newland	Episode: "Hail, Hail, the Gang's All Here"
2005	Charmed	Elder	Episode: "Vaya Con Leos"
2006	CSI: NY	Dr. Burr	Episode: "Super Men"
2006	Cold Case	Joe Livingston	Episode: "The Key"

== Selected bibliography ==
- Heyn, Christopher. "A Conversation with Eugene Robert Glazer." Inside Section One: Creating and Producing TV's La Femme Nikita. Introduction by Peta Wilson. Los Angeles: Persistence of Vision Press, 2006. 82-87. ISBN 0-9787625-0-9. In-depth conversation with Eugene Robert Glazer about his role as Operations on La Femme Nikita, as well as his acting experience in both the U.S. and Canada.
