= Disco Fever (film) =

1978 film

- Directed by: Lamar Card
- Written by: John Arnoldy
- Based on: story by George Barris
- Produced by: Lamar Card; John (Jack) T Parker executive George Barris; Irwin Schaeffer
- Starring: Fabian; Casey Kasem
- Cinematography: Ross Kelsay
- Edited by: Marshall Harvey
- Music by: Jack Allocco
- Distributed by: Group 1 International Distribution Organization Ltd.
- Release date: 1978
- Country: United States
- Language: English

Disco Fever, also known as Jukebox, is a 1978 American film directed by Lamar Card about a nightclub owner who plans the comeback of an ex-teen idol.

== Plot ==
Cybil Michaels is the manager of a disco. One night she spots Richie Desmond, a contemporary of Frankie Avalon and Fabian, who has come in for a drink. She proposes he make a comeback attempt and Richie is interested, but he rejects her sexual overtures.

Richie falls for Jill but has to deal with Jill's jealous ex, Danny, and the manager. The manager wants to launch a disco singer, Tommy Aspen, at a party which is going to take place on a plane that has been fitted with a stage.

Richie wants to sing new material and Cybil assures him she is supportive. She offers up a new contract and bribes Richie's manager, Brian Parker, to get Richie to sign the contract. Richie does so at Brian's urging.

Cybil then tells Richie he must play his old material on the plane. Richie is upset but Cybil points out she has full creative control over his career for the next seven years.

On the plane Richie arrives and performs his new song, to the chagrin of Tommy. It is a big success.

== Cast ==
- Fabian as Richie Desmond
- Casey Kasem as Brian Parker
- Phoebe Dorin as Cybil Michaels
- Susette Carroll as Renny Lawrence
- Rick Goldman as Ned Stiner
- Michael Blodgett as Tommy Aspen
- Tanya George as Connie
- Kate Netter as Jill
- George Barris "King of the Kustomizers" as himself
- Shirley Barris as herself
- Irwin Schaeffer as himself
- Tanya Lemani as Celeste
- Joel Kramer as Danny
- Stephanie Black as Brenda
- Joji Barris as Michelle
- Shotzi Barris as Frank
- Jack Parker as Lawyer Schaeffer
- Eduardo Nieto
- Deborah North

== Production ==
The film was based on a story by George Barris, who also produced. Barris was best known as a car customiser whose work often appeared in films. He would occasionally produce movies.

It was known during filming as Jet Set Disco.

== Songs ==
- "Moving on" - Composed and Arranged by Jack Allocco (as Jack Allen Allocco)
- "My Turn to Fly" - Composed by Gary Verna and Jack Allocco (as Jack Allen Allocco), Arranged by Jack Allocco (as Jack Allen Allocco)
- "Carry on, Carry on" - Composed by Gary Verna and Jack Allocco (as Jack Allen Allocco), Arranged by Jack Allocco (as Jack Allen Allocco)
- "Till I Get Through to You", Composed by Gene Nelson (as Gene) and Paul Nelson, Arranged by Jack Allocco (as Jack Allen Allocco)
- "Rain Dance' Written by Kathy Kurasch and Suzi Maddox

== Reception ==
One critic said "Fabian is totally unconvincing... obviously the money men couldn't afford good script writers, a variety of sets or even good, reliable actors."
