= The Omega Glory =

- Star Trek: The Original Series episode
- Episode no.: Season 2 Episode 23
- Directed by: Vincent McEveety
- Written by: Gene Roddenberry
- Cinematography by: Jerry Finnerman
- Production code: 054
- Original air date: March 1, 1968

Guest appearances
- Morgan Woodward – Captain Ronald Tracey; Ed McCready – Dr. Carter; Roy Jenson – Cloud William; Irene Kelly – Sirah; Lloyd Kino – Wu; David L. Ross – Lt. Galloway; Morgan Farley – Yang Scholar; Frank Atienza – Kohm Villager; Frank da Vinci – Security Guard; Eddie Paskey – Lt. Leslie; William Blackburn – Lt. Hadley

Episode chronology
← Previous "By Any Other Name"	Next → "The Ultimate Computer"
- Star Trek: The Original Series season 2

"The Omega Glory" is the twenty-third episode of the second season of the American science fiction television series Star Trek. Written by Gene Roddenberry and directed by Vincent McEveety, it was first broadcast March 1, 1968. In the episode, Captain Kirk must find the cure to a deadly disease and put an end to another Starfleet captain's cultural interference. The story was one of three outlines submitted for selection as the second pilot of Star Trek, the others being "Mudd's Women" and "Where No Man Has Gone Before".

Retrospective reviews of "The Omega Glory" rank it among the worst episodes of the original series.

== Plot ==
As the Federation Starship Enterprise approaches the planet Omega IV, the USS Exeter is found orbiting it. Captain Kirk, First Officer Spock, Dr. McCoy and Lt. Galloway beam over to the Exeter to investigate. They find the ship deserted, save for a few uniforms that are covered with a crystalline substance found to be human remains. The ship's logs reveal that the Exeter's crew died from an infectious disease that had been brought from the planet, and that Enterprise's landing party is now infected and must beam down to the planet if they are to survive.

Kirk's party beams down to the last coordinates stored in the Exeter's computer. There, they discover Exeter Captain Ron Tracey (Morgan Woodward). Tracey explains that he had been on the planet when the disease had ravaged his ship, stranding him. He says he has discovered that remaining on the planet confers immunity to the disease. He then reveals that the villagers he is living with on the planet, known as "Kohms", are at war with "savages" called "Yangs".

After a Yang attack, Spock investigates the field of battle and finds evidence that Tracey has been helping the Kohms, in violation of the Prime Directive. Kirk tries to contact the Enterprise, but is prevented by Tracey, who tries to justify his violation by revealing that the planet’s natives are not only immune to the mysterious disease, but have also developed lifespans of over 1000 years.

Tracey orders McCoy to investigate the secret of their longevity and has Kirk and Spock locked up in a crude jail with two Yang prisoners, one male and one female. Kirk has the male Yang loosen the bars of the cell window, but the untrusting Yang knocks out Kirk and escapes with the woman. When Kirk recovers, he and Spock make their own escape.

Spock is reunited with McCoy, and modifies some medical equipment, turning it into a makeshift communicator, but Tracey discovers this and destroys it. McCoy and Kirk try to explain to Tracey that they have discovered that the natives' longevity has nothing to do with their immunity to the disease, but Tracey's mind snaps, and he attempts to force Kirk to order more weapons to be sent down from Enterprise.

During a struggle between the two, Yang warriors arrive and carry everyone back to their village. It turns out that their leader is Kirk's former cellmate, known as Cloud William. During a ceremony to celebrate the Yang victory, Kirk and Spock, discussing the Yang culture, connect the names Yang and Kohm with "Yankee" and "Communist". Spock then conjectures that the history of Omega IV had closely paralleled that of Earth until the former was devastated by a biological war that Earth had avoided. This hypothesis is confirmed when William produces a very old American flag, along with ancient documents from which he recites the Pledge of Allegiance in a garbled accent. The Yangs are shocked when Kirk chimes in to recite the end of the Pledge.

Tracey, in an attempt to save his own life, denounces Kirk and Spock, claiming that they have been cast out of heaven, and points to Spock's similar appearance to the devil as proof. William asks Kirk to prove himself by completing the "sacred words" from another document. Because of the accent, Kirk doesn't understand the words and instead suggests a trial by combat between himself and Tracey. As they fight, Spock sends a telepathic suggestion to William's female companion to activate the communicator, lying near her, which she does. Sulu thereby learns what’s going on, beams down with a security team to investigate, and takes Tracey into custody.

Cloud William now kneels before Kirk as if he were a deity, but Kirk orders him to stand. The second document proves to be a version of the American Constitution. Kirk rebukes the Yangs for forgetting its meaning, and declares that the words were meant not just for the Yangs, but "must apply to everyone or they mean nothing." William does not fully understand, but swears to Kirk that the words will be obeyed. As the landing party leaves, Kirk pays a moment of silent tribute to the flag.

== Analysis ==
According to author Daniel Leonard Bernardi in his book, Star Trek and History: Race-ing Toward a White Future: "Like the Federation, the Comms [sic] have full command of the English language (although they speak with a homogenized 'Asian' accent). The beginning of the episode thus shows that those with white skin can be uncivilized savages and those with yellow skin can be civilized and rational [...] This would be counter to the hegemonic representation of Asians in the United States media; that diverse collective of peoples are consistently constructed in film and television as a menacing 'yellow horde.'"

Bernardi goes on to say:

'The Omega Glory' is not, however, a counter-hegemonic episode. In fact, the episode not only reveals an unwillingness to be critical of the hegemony of racist representations, but also systematically participates in the stereotyping of Asians. As the story progresses, the Yangs are constructed as noble savages; their cause to annihilate the Comms is established as justified. The Comms, on the other hand, are constructed as brutal and oppressive; their drive to suppress the Yangs is established as totalitarian. This more hegemonic articulation of race is made evident when Kirk and Spock realize the extent to which the Yangs and Comms parallel Earth's civilizations. In this light, the Yangs are no longer savages, but noble warriors fighting for a just and honorable cause. They want to regain the land they lost in a war with the Asiatics.

Allan W. Austin, Professor of History at Misericordia University, writes that this episode

... consciously and unconsciously reflected a number of deep American anxieties that grew out of more than two decades of the Cold War. By the mid–1960s, some Americans began to critique what they saw as mindless nationalism. This unthinking patriotism had coalesced as part of a liberal consensus grounded in confidence in the essential soundness of American society as well as the assumption of a pervasive communist threat to the U.S. and its allies. Many supporters of the liberal consensus believed that economic growth and development would solve any remaining social inequalities while damping class conflict.

Like Bernardi, Austin discusses racial stereotypes in the episode. Citing Bernardi, he argues that, instead of considering "the Yangs as noble savages, the Yangs can now be seen as an example of the result of mindless nationalism run amok, albeit still salvageable in Roddenberry's ever-optimistic view of the future." He adds, "Many of the qualities ascribed to the Yangs mirrored terms used to describe the 'yellow peril' at an earlier time in U.S. history. For example, Tracy, after noting directly that the Yangs are white, describes them as vicious and deceptive enemies who cannot communicate intelligently."

In "The Omega Glory", a 2006 essay reflecting on stories that have tried to imagine the future, Michael Chabon says, "Eed plebnista, intoned the devolved Yankees, in the Star Trek episode 'The Omega Glory', who had somehow managed to hold on to and venerate as sacred gobbledygook the Preamble to the Constitution, norkon forden perfectunun. All they needed was a Captain Kirk to come and add a little interpretive water to the freeze-dried document, and the American way of life would flourish again."

== Production ==
This story was originally offered by Roddenberry as an option for the second pilot titled "The Omega Story". The original script, while not significantly different in tone and message, did have some significant differences in characterization and background information. Since the character of Dr. Leonard McCoy had not been created yet, the ship's surgeon is named Milton Perry, and in one version of the script it is Perry who attempts to use a "Medi-Scanner" to signal the Enterprise, hoping for rescue - only to be killed when Captain Tracey destroys the scanner with his phaser. In addition, the script called for Dr. Carter of the Exeter to be shown dissolving onscreen.

The costume designer William Ware Theiss made a production error and mistakenly gave the crew of the USS Exeter a unique uniform insignia, different from the iconic delta on the uniforms of the Enterprise’s crew. The mistake was caught before the episode aired, but it was too late to correct it. A memo was immediately sent out announcing that Gene Roddenberry had been consulted, and that, going forward, every starship crew’s uniform should have same delta insignia that is on the uniforms worn by the Enterprise crew.

== Reception ==
In 2015, Entertainment Weekly highlighted the scene where Kirk reads the United States Constitution, as one of the most important moments in that character's life.

WhatCulture ranked this episode the 15th worst episode of the Star Trek franchise.

In 2016, SyFy included this episode in a group of Star Trek franchise episodes they felt were commonly disliked but "deserved a second chance".

In 2017, this episode was rated the 8th worst episode of the Star Trek franchise up to that time, by ScreenRant. In 2018, CBR included this episode on a ranking of episodes they stated were "So Bad They Must Be Seen". CBS News listed "The Omega Glory" as one of the worst episodes of the original series.

In 2017, Den of Geek ranked this episode as the 5th worst Star Trek episode of the original series.
