= The Swinging Barmaids =

- Theatrical release poster by John Solie
- Directed by: Gus Trikonis
- Written by: Charles B. Griffith
- Produced by: Ed Carlin
- Starring: Bruce Watson; Laura Hippe; Katie Saylor; Renie Radich; William Smith
- Cinematography: Irv Goodnoff
- Edited by: Jerry Cohen
- Music by: Don Bagley
- Production company: Carlin Company Productions
- Distributed by: Premiere Releasing Org.
- Release date: July 1975
- Running time: 88 minutes
- Country: United States
- Language: English
- Box office: $1,250,000 (1980 release)

The Swinging Barmaids is a 1975 American exploitation film about a serial killer who targets cocktail waitresses. The film was directed by Gus Trikonis, and stars Bruce Watson, Laura Hippe, William Smith, and Dyanne Thorne. It was re-released in 1980 as Eager Beavers.

William Smith later recalled "Jesus Christ, that was a wild fuckin’ movie! (Laughing) Yeah, that was kind of fun."

== Plot ==
After murdering Boo-Boo, a cocktail waitress at the Swing-A-Ling Club, Tom, a psychotic killer, disguises himself and gains employment as a bouncer at the same club where he continues his killing spree. While police lieutenant Harry White attempts to stop him, Tom sets his sights on 'pure' waitress Jenny.

== Cast ==
- Bruce Watson as Tom
- Laura Hippe as Jenny
- Katie Saylor as Susie
- Renie Radich as Marie
- William Smith as Lieutenant Harry White
- Dyanne Thorne as "Boo-Boo"
- Zitto Kazann as Zitto
- Jim Travis as Dave
- Ray Galvin as Jack
- John Alderman as Andrews
- Milt Kogan as Dan
- Judith Roberts as Sally

== Cult status ==
Quentin Tarantino screened the film at his festival in 2007. A critic at the screening wrote:

This flick is kind of bizarre. It’s a serial killer flick that’s not really high on the gore or suspense. It’s a sexploitation flick without much titillation. It’s a William Smith movie where he’s kind of unthreatening (until the end when he’s as badass as you want him to be). None of that means it’s a lame movie. Not at all.

Shock magazine wrote "By normal critical standards, this is the dregs. But as no-budget 70s exploitation goes, this crap succeeds on every necessary level (I particularly enjoyed the crude, handheld camerawork during the murder scenes). Laced with fitfully sleazy kicks and a surprisingly energetic, corpse-laden finale, this inept flick is a wonderful example of the bad-is-good nature of drive-in cinema."

== See also ==
- List of American films of 1975
