= Supervan (film) =

- Directed by: Lamar Card
- Written by: John Arnoldy; Robert Easter; Neva Friedenn
- Produced by: Sal A. Capra; Sandy Cohn; Nolan Russell Bradford
- Starring: Mark Schneider; Katie Saylor; Morgan Woodward; Len Lesser
- Cinematography: Irv Goodnoff
- Edited by: Bill Butler
- Music by: Mark Mercury; Bob Stone
- Production company: Empire Productions
- Distributed by: Empire Releasing (United States); Premiere Releasing Organization (International)
- Release date: March 1977
- Running time: 91 minutes
- Country: United States
- Language: English

Supervan is a 1977 American vansploitation film directed by Lamar Card, with a heavily modified van central to the storyline. It is an action adventure comedy road movie and is rated PG in the United States.

== Plot ==
Clint Morgan (Mark Schneider) goes to The Invitational Freak-Out for custom van enthusiasts intending to enter his van, The Sea Witch, in a contest. In saving a runaway, Karen (Katie Saylor), from rapist bikers, Clint loses his van. He goes to his friend Bosley (Tom Kindle), a rebel designer, who lets Clint and Karen enter his solar-powered laser-firing custom van, Vandora, in place of The Sea Witch.

== Cast ==
- Mark Schneider as Clint Morgan
- Katie Saylor as Karen Trenton
- Morgan Woodward as T.B. Trenton
- Len Lesser as Banks
- Skip Riley as Vince
- Bruce Kimball as Sarge
- Tom Kindle as Boseley
- George Barris as King of the Customizers
- Charles Bukowski as Wet T-shirt Contest Water Boy

== The van ==
The titular "Supervan" was customized by George Barris, based on a stock Dodge Sportsman van. Among its most unusual features are solar panels, the ability to emit laser beams and an entire custom body. Coffman called it a "bizarre, 70s-futuristic beast" and scale reproductions were sold as merchandising for the film, which is unusual for the genre. The film has a cameo appearance by Charles Bukowski

== See also ==
- List of American films of 1977
