= Katie Saylor =

American actress (born 1951)

Katie A. Saylor
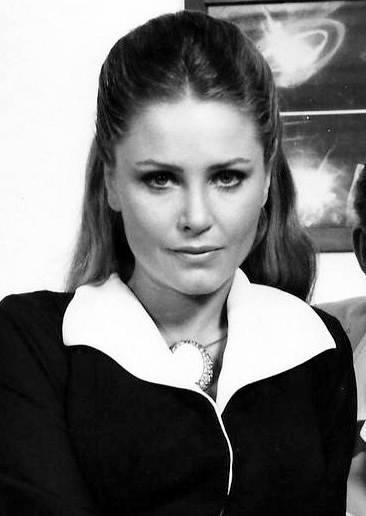
- Born: October 23, 1951 (age 75); United States
- Other name: Katie Strassman
- Occupation: Actress
- Known for: Playing Lianna in The Fantastic Journey
- Height: 5 ft 2.5 in (159 cm)

Katie Saylor (born October 23, 1951) is an American former actress.

== Early life ==
Adopted as a baby by fashion designer Larry Aldrich, Saylor was born and raised in Connecticut and studied with the American Theater Wing/Academy of Dramatic Arts in New York City and at the Shelton Actors Lab in San Francisco.

== Career ==
After beginning her acting career in off-Broadway theatre, Saylor relocated to Los Angeles in 1973 and worked primarily as a B movie actress prior to landing the female lead in the short-lived (10 episodes) NBC-TV science fiction series The Fantastic Journey. The show premiered on February 3, 1977, with Saylor playing Liana, "daughter of an Atlantean father and an extraterrestrial mother", who was introduced in the second episode. Saylor appeared in seven episodes, then was absent from the last two episodes of the series. She retired from acting due to illness at that time.

== Personal life ==
Saylor married attorney Harvey Strassman in November 1976. Strassman represented Noah Dietrich in Dietrich's lawsuit against his long-time employer Howard Hughes. As of 2012, the couple resided in the Studio City neighborhood of Los Angeles.

== Filmography ==
- Invasion of the Bee Girls (1973) - Gretchen Grubowsky
- Men of the Dragon (1974, ABC Movie of the Week) - Lisa Kimbro
- Dirty O'Neil (1974) - Vera
- The Swinging Barmaids (1975) - Susie
- Supervan (1977) - Karen Trenton
- The Fantastic Journey (1977, TV series) - Liana
