= Nanny and the Professor (film) =

- Written by: William Shippey
- Starring: Juliet Mills; Richard Long; David Doremus; Kim Richards; Trent Lehman; Joan Gerber
- Country of origin: United States
- Original language: English

Production
- Producer: Fred Calvert
- Running time: 60 minutes
- Production company: Fred Calvert Productions

Original release
- Network: ABC
- Release: September 30, 1972

Nanny and the Professor is a 1972 American animated comedy TV movie based on the sitcom by the same name. The series' original cast reprised their roles from the live action series. Unlike in the television series, Nanny openly performs magic, while in the TV series it was only implied. The film was broadcast on September 30, 1972, as part of The ABC Saturday Superstar Movie.

A sequel followed the next year: Nanny and the Professor and the Phantom of the Circus, which also aired on The ABC Saturday Superstar Movie on November 17, 1973.

== Voice cast ==
- Juliet Mills as Nanny
- Richard Long as Professor Harold Everett
- David Doremus as Hal Everett
- Kim Richards as Prudence Everett
- Trent Lehman as Butch Everett
- Joan Gerber as Aunt Henrietta
