= Kim Richards =

American actress (born 1964)

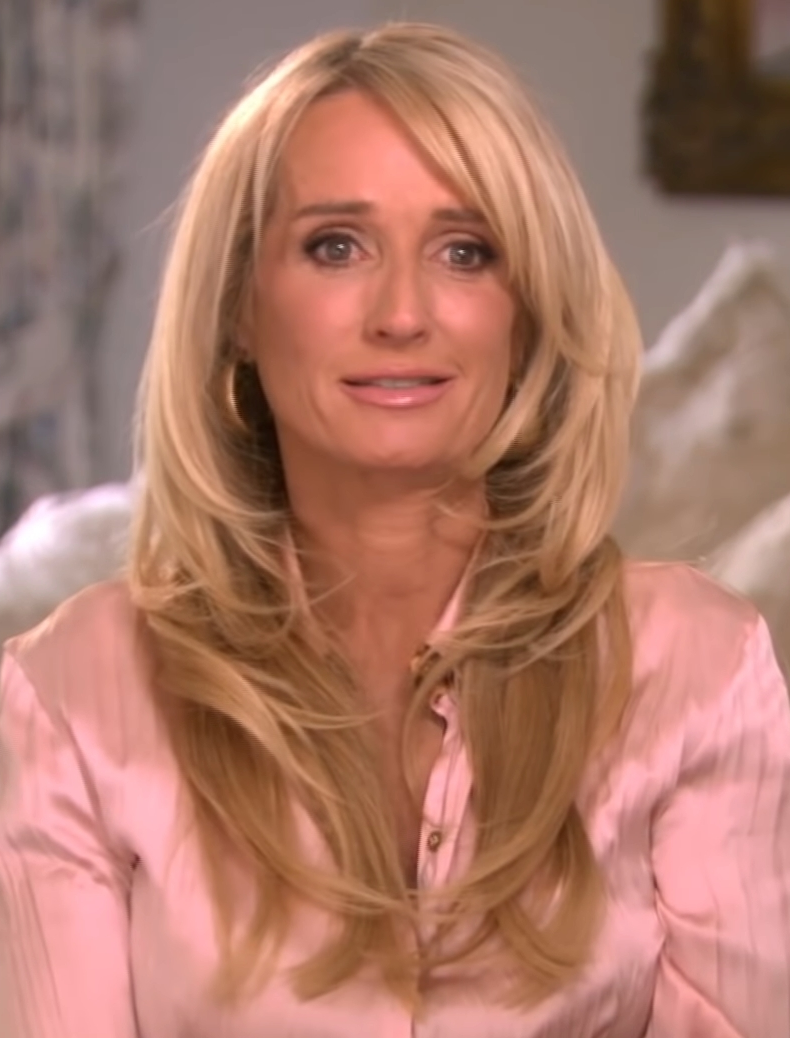
- Richards in 2010
- Born: Kim Erica Richards; September 19, 1964 (age 62); Mineola, New York, U.S.
- Occupations: Actress; television personality
- Years active: 1970–1990; 2002–2015
- Notable credit(s): Nanny and the Professor; Escape to Witch Mountain; Return from Witch Mountain; The Real Housewives of Beverly Hills
- Spouses: G. Monty Brinson (m. 1985; div. 1988) Gregg Davis (m. 1988; div. 1991)
- Partner(s): John Jackson (1992–1996); Wynn Katz (2012–2018)
- Children: 4
- Relatives: Kyle Richards (sister); Kathy Hilton (half-sister); Paris Hilton (niece); Nicky Hilton Rothschild (niece)

Kim Erica Richards (born September 19, 1964) is an American former child actress and television personality. Richards began her career as a child actress and rose to prominence from her roles as Prudence Everett in Nanny and the Professor (1970–1971), Olga in Little House on the Prairie (1974), Tia Malone in Escape to Witch Mountain (1975), and its sequel Return from Witch Mountain (1977). In 2010, Richards would begin appearing in the reality series The Real Housewives of Beverly Hills alongside her sister Kyle Richards. She was a part of the show's principal cast for the first five seasons and has made guest appearances in the subsequent seasons.

== Early life ==
Richards was born September 19, 1964, in Mineola, New York, the daughter of Kathleen Mary (née Dugan) and her second husband, Kenneth Edwin Richards. They separated in 1972 and her mother later remarried. Her younger sister is actress, socialite, and television personality Kyle Richards. Her half-sister is socialite Kathy Hilton, from her mother's prior marriage to Larry Avanzino; making her the aunt of Nicky and Paris Hilton. Richards is of Welsh and Irish ancestry. Kim and Kathy were raised in Lloyd Harbor, New York before their father moved them to Los Angeles, where Kyle was born.

== Career ==
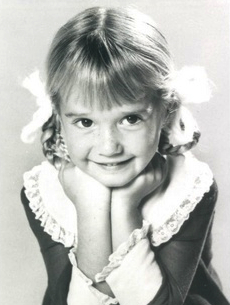
Kim Richards (age 5); publicity photo for Nanny and the Professor (1970).

Richards' career began when she was months old and appeared in a TV commercial for Firth Carpet. From 1970 to 1971, she starred as Prudence Everett in the television series Nanny and the Professor. She also starred in several Disney films, including Escape to Witch Mountain, No Deposit, No Return, and Return from Witch Mountain.

In 1974 and 1976, Richards appeared in Disney's Whiz Kid Capers series (The Whiz Kid and the Mystery at Riverton and The Whiz Kid and the Carnival Caper), two television movies that aired as part of The Wonderful World of Disney anthology series.

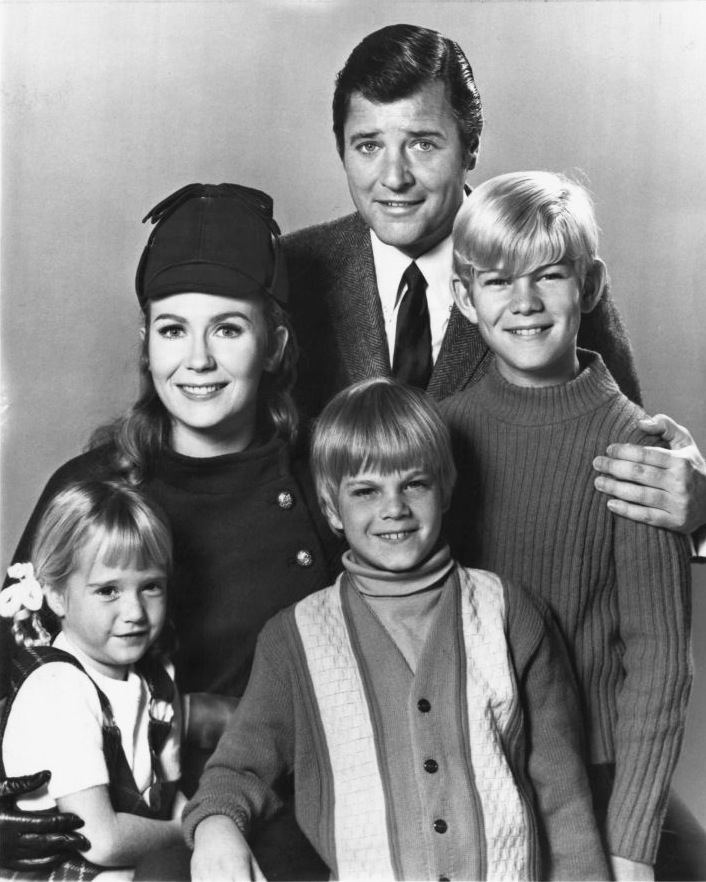
Nanny and the Professor cast 1970 (clockwise from top) Richard Long, David Doremus, Trent Lehman, Richards and Juliet Mills

Richards and her sister Kyle played sisters in the thriller film The Car (1977). She teamed up once again with Witch Mountain co-star Ike Eisenmann in the made-for-television movie Devil Dog: The Hound of Hell (1978). In the 1976 film Assault on Precinct 13, she played a young girl who was brutally murdered when a gang member fired a round into her chest. She later starred in the short-lived television series Hello, Larry (1979–80) and appeared as a guest on numerous episodes of American television shows, including Emergency!, Diff'rent Strokes, Alice, Fantasy Island, The Love Boat, CHiPs, Magnum, P.I., James at 16, The Dukes of Hazzard, The Rockford Files, and Little House on the Prairie as Olga Nordstrom.

As a young adult, she appeared in Meatballs Part II (1984) and Tuff Turf (1985). in 1990, she co-produced the film Escape, along with then-husband G. Monty Brinson. Richards appeared in a supporting role as Christina Ricci's estranged mother in the drama film Black Snake Moan (2006). She made a cameo appearance in Race to Witch Mountain (2009), playing a waitress named Tina, a minor variation from the character Tia she played in the franchise's 1975 and 1978 films.

In 2010, Richards began appearing as a regular cast member of The Real Housewives of Beverly Hills, alongside her sister Kyle. After five seasons, Kim was let go as a full-time cast member following her personal struggles. She returned as a guest star, though, in the show's sixth, seventh, ninth, tenth and thirteenth seasons. On April 10, 2023, in honor of National Sibling Day, Richards and half-sister Kathy Hilton appeared together on Entertainment Tonight's "Spill the ETea" segment discussing their relationship, their children and being grandparents.

== Personal life ==
In 1985, Richards married Monty Brinson, a supermarket-franchise heir who later became a professional poker player. They have one daughter together, Brooke Ashley (born February 21, 1986).

Brinson and Richards divorced amicably in 1988. Later that year, she married Gregg Davis, the son of petroleum mogul Marvin Davis and his wife Barbara Davis. They have two children together: a daughter, Whitney Nicole Davis (born March 16, 1990) and a son, Chad Austin Davis (born May 26, 1991). Richards and Davis divorced in 1991.

Following her separation from Davis, Richards dated commodities salesman John J. Collett, a central figure in a criminal scheme involving 8,000 elderly investors and nearly US$150 million (equivalent to $355 million in 2025) in losses. On October 28, 1991, Collett was murdered outside Brent's Deli in Northridge. He was shot twice in the head at point-blank range by a hit man who had been paid US$30,000 (equivalent to $71,000 in 2025). He was speaking with Kim on the phone when the shooting occurred. Richards spoke about Collett's murder on an episode of The Real Housewives of Beverly Hills.

After Collett's death, Richards was in a relationship with aircraft-parts supplier John Jackson from 1992 to 1996. She gave birth to their daughter, Kimberly Collette Jackson, on August 23, 1995.

From 2012 to 2018, she was in a relationship with businessman Wynn Katz. They appeared together on WE TV's Marriage Boot Camp in 2018, and split after their appearance on the show.

On April 15, 2015, Richards was arrested and charged with trespassing, public intoxication, resisting an officer, and battery on a police officer at the Beverly Hills Hotel. She spent the night in Los Angeles County Jail and was released the next morning on bail of US$20,000 (equivalent to $27,000 in 2025). On September 14, 2015, Richards pled no contest to these charges and was sentenced to three years probation.

On August 2, 2015, Richards was again arrested for allegedly shoplifting at a San Fernando Valley Target department store. She was booked into the Van Nuys jail, being released the next day, on August 3, after posting bail of US$5,000 (equivalent to $7,000 in 2025). In October, she pled no contest to one count of petty theft and was sentenced to 300 hours of community service.

Richards remained close friends with first husband Brinson and helped care for him during his struggle with lung cancer, which eventually caused his death on January 25, 2016, at age 58.

Richards has two grandsons and a granddaughter through her oldest daughter Brooke and husband Thayer Wiederhorn.

== Filmography ==
=== Film ===
Year	Title	Role	Notes
1975	Escape to Witch Mountain	Tia Malone	
1976	No Deposit, No Return	Tracy	
1976	Special Delivery	Juliette	
1976	Assault on Precinct 13	Kathy Lawson	
1977	The Car	Lynne Marie Parent	
1977	Return from Witch Mountain	Tia Malone	
1984	Meatballs Part II	Cheryl	
1985	Tuff Turf	Frankie Croyden	
1990	Escape	Brooke Howser	Also producer
2006	Black Snake Moan	Sandy Doole	
2009	Race to Witch Mountain	Tina	
2015	Sharknado 3: Oh Hell No!	Babs Jensen	

=== Television ===
Year	Title	Role	Notes
1970–71	Nanny and the Professor	Prudence Everett	54 episodes
1971	The Strange Monster of Strawberry Cove	Girl	TV movie, uncredited
1971–76	The Wonderful World of Disney	Girl, Daphne 'Daffy' Fernald, Sara, Leroy	5 episodes
1972	The F.B.I.	Barbie Ghormley	Episode: "Dark Christmas"
1972	Nanny and the Professor	Prudence Everett	Animated TV-movie
1973	Nanny and the Professor and the Phantom of the Circus	Prudence Everett	Animated TV-movie
1973	The Picture of Dorian Gray	Beatrice (as a child)	TV movie
1973	Here We Go Again	Jan Standish	13 episodes
1973	Alvin the Magnificent		TV movie
1973–77	ABC Afterschool Specials	Missey, Minnow	2 episodes
1974, 1977	Police Story	Melanie/Kerry McGuire	2 episodes
1974	Little House on the Prairie	Olga Nordstrom	Episode: "Town Party-Country Party"
1974	Benjamin Franklin		Episode: "The Whirlwind"
1974	Return of the Big Cat	Amy McClaren	TV movie
1974	Emergency!	Melissa	Episode: "How Green Was My Thumb?"
1974	The New Temperatures Rising Show	Little Girl	Episode: "Operation Mercy"
1975	The Streets of San Francisco	Julie Todd	Episode: "River of Fear"
1975	Medical Story		Episode: "Million Dollar Baby"
1976	Sara	Maude	Episode: "Code of the West"
1976	The Rockford Files	Marin Rose Gaily	Episode: "The Family Hour"
1976	Medical Center	Penny	Episode: "If Wishes Were Horses"
1976	Family	Laura Richardson	Episode: "Monday is Forever"
1976	Police Woman	Kerry McGuire	Episode: "Father to the Man"
1977	Raid on Entebbe	Alice	TV movie
1977–78	James at 15/16	Sandy Hunter	21 episodes
1978	Project UFO	Amy Forman	
1978	Devil Dog: The Hound of Hell	Bonnie Barry	TV movie
1979	$weepstake$		Episode: "Lynn and Grover and Joey"
1979	Hizzonner	Jamie	Episode: "Mizzonner"
1979	Diff'rent Strokes	Ruthie Alder	3 episodes
1979–80	Hello, Larry	Ruthie Alder	35 episodes
1980	Kraft Salutes Disneyland's 25th Anniversary	Herself	TV special
1981	Why Us?	Holly Sanborn	TV short
1982	The Love Boat	Gail, Lilian Gerbert	Episode: "Command Performance/Hyde and Seek/Sketchy Love"
1982	CHiPs	Sheila	Episode: "Tight Fit"
1982	Alice	Lisa	2 episodes
1982	Magnum P.I.	Carrie Reardon	Episode: "Mixed Doubles"
1983	Lottery!	Valerie	Episode: "Boston: False Illusion"
1983	The Dukes of Hazzard	Nancylou Nelson	Episode: "Cooter's Girl"
1984	The Mississippi		Episode: "Informed Consent"
2002	The Blair Witch Mountain Project	Tia Malone	TV short
2004, 2007	The Simple Life	Herself	2 episodes
2010–2020, 2023–24	The Real Housewives of Beverly Hills	Herself	Series regular (Seasons 1–5); Guest star (Seasons 6–7, 9–10, 13)
2013	Stars in Danger: The High Dive	Herself	TV special
2013	Vanderpump Rules	Herself	Episode: "Tooth or Consequences"
2015	Revenge	Stephanie	Episode: "Kindred"
2015	Dr. Phil	Herself	Episode: "Real Housewife's Exclusive: Kim Richards Tells All About Drunken Arrest"
2016	The Mother/Daughter Experiment: Celebrity Edition	Herself	Episodes: "Housewife vs. Bad Girl", "The Hot Seat"
2018	Marriage Boot Camp: Reality Stars	Herself	Season 13; 11 episodes

=== Music videos ===
Year	Song	Artist
2014	G.U.Y.	Lady Gaga
