= Christine Jorgensen =

American transgender actress (1926–1989)

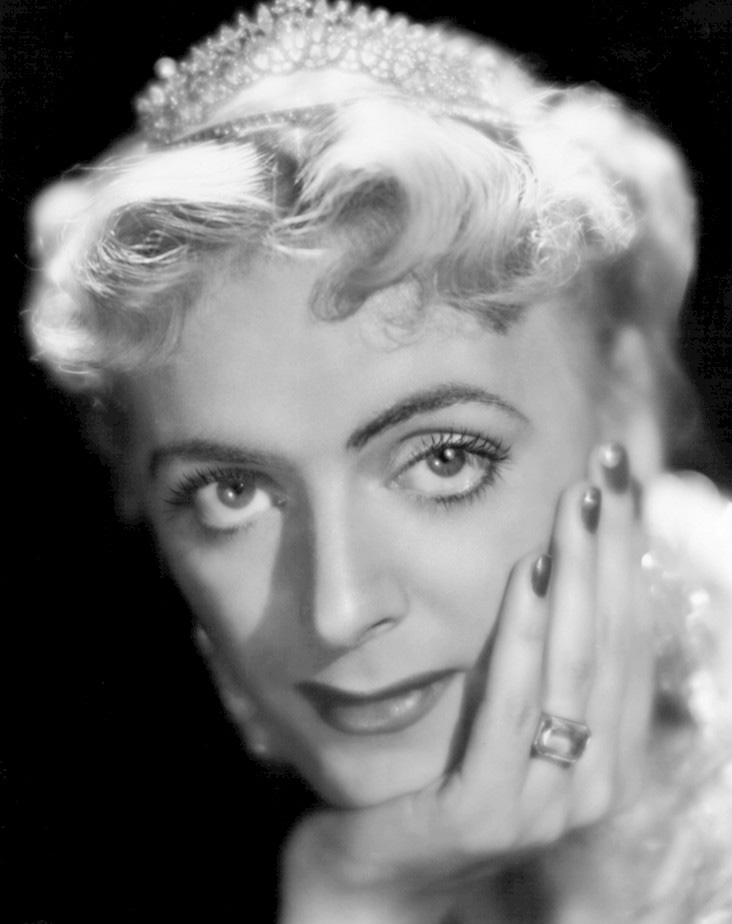
- Jorgensen in 1954
- Born: May 30, 1926; New York City, U.S.
- Died: May 3, 1989 (aged 62); San Clemente, California, U.S.
- Education: Mohawk Valley Community College, The Progressive School of Photography, Manhattan Medical and Dental Assistant School
- Occupations: Actress, night club singer
- Known for: Pioneering gender reassignment

Christine Jorgensen (/ˈdʒɔːrɡənsən/; May 30, 1926 – May 3, 1989) was an American actress, singer, and transgender activist. A trans woman, she was the first person to become widely known in the United States for having sex reassignment surgery.

In 1944, Jorgensen was drafted into the U.S. Army during World War II. After she served as a military clerical worker, Jorgensen attended several schools, worked, and pursued a photography career. During this time, she learned about sex reassignment surgery and traveled to Europe, where in Copenhagen, Denmark, she obtained special permission to undergo a series of operations beginning in 1951.

Upon her return to the United States in the early 1950s, her transition was the subject of a New York Daily News front-page story. She became an instant celebrity, known for her directness and polished wit, and used the platform to advocate for transgender people.

Her 1967 autobiography Christine Jorgensen: A Personal Autobiography sold almost 450,000 copies. Throughout her career, she gave lectures at colleges and universities on the topics of transsexuality. According to publicist Chris Costello, Jorgensen hated the term "transsexual", preferring to refer to herself simply as someone who had gone through a "sex change."

== Early life ==
Jorgensen was the second child of carpenter and contractor George William Jorgensen and his wife, Florence Davis Hansen. She was raised in the Belmont neighborhood of the Bronx, New York City, and baptized a Lutheran. She described herself as a "frail, blond, introverted little boy who ran from fistfights and rough-and-tumble games".

Jorgensen graduated from Christopher Columbus High School in 1945 and was soon drafted into the U.S. Army at 19. After being discharged from the Army, she attended Mohawk Valley Community College in Utica, New York; the Progressive School of Photography in New Haven, Connecticut; and the Manhattan Medical and Dental Assistant School in New York City. She also worked briefly for Pathé News.

== Gender transition ==
Returning to New York after military service, and increasingly concerned over, as one obituary later called it, a "lack of male physical development", Jorgensen heard about sex reassignment surgery. She began taking estrogen in the form of ethinylestradiol. She started researching the surgery with the help of Joseph Angelo, the husband of a classmate at the Manhattan Medical and Dental Assistant School. Jorgensen intended to go to Sweden, where the only doctors worldwide who performed the surgery were located. During a stopover in Copenhagen to visit relatives, she met Christian Hamburger, a Danish endocrinologist and specialist in rehabilitative hormonal therapy associated with the Serum Institute. Jorgensen stayed in Denmark and underwent hormone replacement therapy under Hamburger's direction. She chose the name Christine in honor of Hamburger.

Doctor Hamburger explained the gender hormone procedure, "The first sign was an increase in size of the mammary glands and then hair began to grow where the patient had a bald patch on the temple. Finally the whole body changed from a male to a female shape". More than a year after beginning hormone therapy, Jorgensen received her first surgery. Professor E. Dahl-Iverson of the Danish State Hospital was named as one of her surgeons, performing "one minor and 4 major operations on her successfully." However, she never publicly explained her new anatomy or the surgery outcome but said, "Everyone is both sexes in varying degrees. I am more of a woman than a man... Of course I can never have children but this does not mean that I cannot have natural sexual intercourse – I am very much in the position right now of a woman who has a hysterectomy", in 1958.

Her parents were from Denmark, so her trip for reassignment surgery was easy to disguise as a trip to visit family. She did not relay her plan for procedures on the trip to anyone due to her concern that she would not be supported.

She obtained special permission from the Danish Minister of Justice Helga Pedersen to receive funding to undergo a series of operations in Denmark. On September 24, 1951, surgeons at Gentofte Hospital in Copenhagen performed an orchiectomy on Jorgensen. In a letter to friends on October 8, 1951, she referred to how the surgery affected her:

As you can see by the enclosed photos, taken just before the operation, I have changed a great deal. But it is the other changes that are so much more important. Remember the shy, miserable person who left America? Well, that person is no more and, as you can see, I'm in marvelous spirits.

In November 1952, doctors at Copenhagen University Hospital performed a penectomy. In Jorgensen's words, "My second operation, as the previous one, was not such a major work of surgery as it may imply." In 1952, she was quoted in Scope Magazine as saying,

I was one of those people . . . . It was not an easy task for me to face, but only for the happiness it brought me I should not have had the strength to go through these past two years. You see, I was afraid of a much more horrible illness of the mind.

She returned to the United States and eventually obtained a vaginoplasty when the procedure became available. The vaginoplasty was performed under the direction of Dr. Angelo, with Harry Benjamin as a medical adviser. Later, in the preface of Jorgensen's autobiography, Harry Benjamin gave her credit for the advancement of his studies. He wrote, "Indeed, Christine, without you, probably none of this would have happened; the grant, my publications, lectures, etc." In a 1980s Hour Magazine interview with Gary Collins, Jorgensen described her family's acceptance:

My family were very understanding. They had a choice; I gave them only one choice. Either they were to accept me or there was a break. My family did not want to lose me, and I was very close with [my mother and father] until they died.

== Publicity ==
Jorgensen was publicly outed when her letter to her parents in New York leaked to the press. She had planned to keep her transition a secret but she was forcefully outed by the New York Daily News. Her letter stated, "Nature made a mistake which I have had corrected, and now I am your daughter."

The New York Daily News ran a front-page story on December 1, 1952, under the headline "Ex-GI Becomes Blonde Beauty: Bronx Youth Is a Happy Woman After Medication, 6 Operations", which referred to Jorgensen with female pronouns when discussing events after her transition and with male pronouns when discussing events before her transition. Previously, German doctors had performed this type of surgery in the late 1920s and early 1930s; Dorchen Richter and Danish artist Lili Elbe, both patients of Magnus Hirschfeld at the Institut für Sexualwissenschaft in Berlin, were known recipients of such operations, however Elbe died after developing sepsis due to complications from an attempted uterus transplant.

After her surgeries, Jorgensen originally stated that she wanted a quiet life of her design. However, upon returning to the United States, she could only earn a living by making public appearances. Jorgensen was an instant celebrity when she returned to New York in February 1953. A large crowd of journalists met her as she came off her flight, and despite the Danish royal family being on the same flight, the audience largely ignored them in favor of Jorgensen. Soon after her arrival, she launched a successful nightclub act and appeared on television, radio, and theatrical productions, she was the first trans woman to perform at the legendary Delmonico's Restaurant in New York City. Owner Oscar Tucci received criticism for allowing her to perform at the restaurant; however, Tucci considered Jorgensen a friend and welcomed her back to Delmonico's throughout her career. The first five-part authorized account of her story was written by herself in a February 1953 issue of The American Weekly, titled "The Story of My Life". In 1967, she published her autobiography, Christine Jorgensen: A Personal Autobiography, which sold almost 450,000 copies.

In the wake of her transition, part of the media coverage debated her original gender identity, many claiming that she was never fully male, but rather intersex. At the time, a popular theory was that she was a "pseudohermaphrodite" with the internal anatomy of a female and the external anatomy of a male. Nothing that Jorgensen said explicitly supported this theory, but various professionals adopted it anyway. This theory was also used to downplay the importance of Jorgensen's transition, with doctors claiming that her surgeries were "far from a medical rarity... [with] similar cases in hospitals all over the U.S.". Others insisted that Jorgensen's pre-transition body was clearly male and the surgeries were not to mend a physical abnormality, but rather "align her gender with her physical sex." The overwhelming amount of coverage opened new discussions surrounding gender, sex, and transsexuals.

The publicity following her transition and gender reassignment surgery became "a model for other transsexuals for decades. She was a tireless lecturer on the subject of transsexuality, pleading for understanding from a public that all too often wanted to see transsexuals as freaks or perverts... Ms Jorgensen's poise, charm, and wit won the hearts of millions." However, over time the press was much less fascinated by her and started to scrutinize her much more harshly. Print media often asked her if she would pose nude in their publications.

According to publicist Chris Costello, daughter of comedian Lou Costello, Jorgensen hated the term “transsexual,” preferring to refer to herself simply as someone who had gone through a “sex change.”

== Later life ==
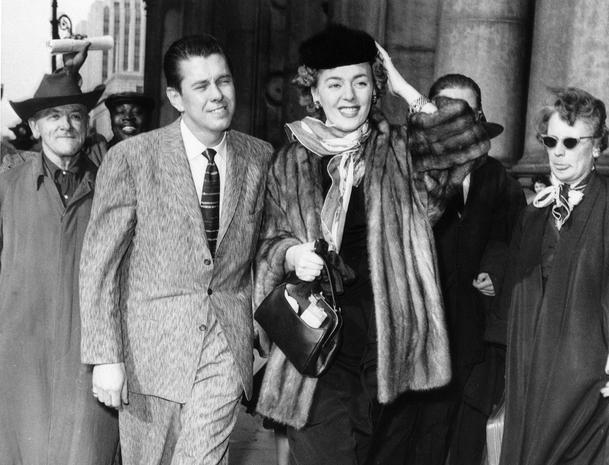
Knox and Jorgensen after being denied a marriage license, April 1959

After her vaginoplasty, Jorgensen planned to marry labor union statistician John Traub, but the engagement was called off. In 1959 she announced her engagement to typist Howard J. Knox in Massapequa Park, New York, where her father built her a house after reassignment surgery. She and Knox settled down and joined a Lutheran church. However, the couple was unable to obtain a marriage license because Jorgensen's birth certificate listed her as male. In a report about the broken engagement, The New York Times reported that Knox had lost his job in Washington, D.C. when his engagement to Jorgensen became known.

After her parents died, Jorgensen moved to California in 1967. She left behind the ranch home built by her father in Massapequa and settled at the Chateau Marmont in Los Angeles. During this same year, Jorgensen published her autobiography, Christine Jorgensen: A Personal Autobiography, which chronicled her life experiences as a transgender woman and included her perspectives on some of her significant life events. In her autobiography, Jorgensen revealed her struggles with depression. She explained how her mental health deteriorated and led her to contemplate suicide but did not act on it. She wrote, "The answer to the problem must not lie in sleeping pills and suicides that look like accidents, or in jail sentences, but rather in life and the freedom to live it."

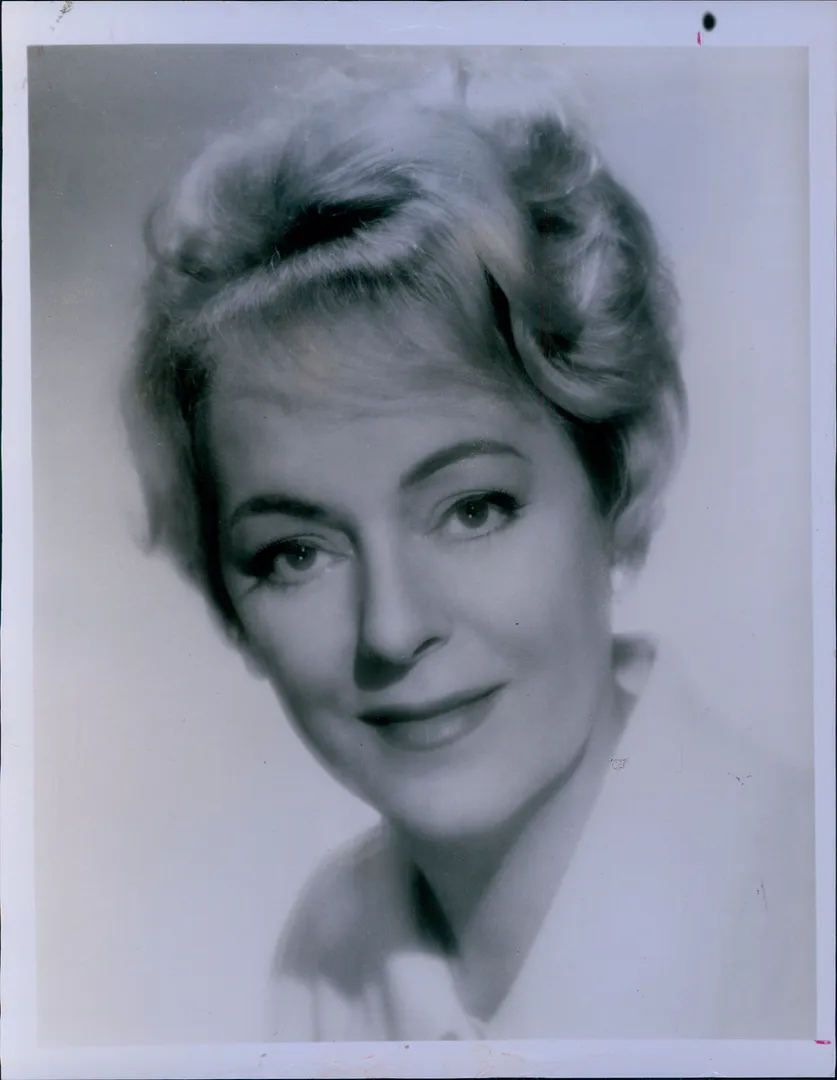
Jorgensen in 1975

During the 1970s and 1980s, Jorgensen toured university campuses and other venues to speak about her experiences. She was known for her directness and polished wit. She once demanded an apology from Vice President Spiro T. Agnew when he called Charles Goodell "the Christine Jorgensen of the Republican Party." Agnew refused her request.

Jorgensen also worked as an actress and nightclub entertainer. In summer stock, she played Madame Rosepettle in the play Oh Dad, Poor Dad, Mamma's Hung You in the Closet and I'm Feelin' So Sad.

Circa 1958, while she was performing at the Latin Quarter in New York, she saw the 1958 musical Flower Drum Song on Broadway. There, she saw Pat Suzuki perform "I Enjoy Being a Girl", which shortly became Jorgensen's "theme song". Jorgensen included the song in her nightclub act, closing with a Wonder Woman costume. Warner Communications, owners of the Wonder Woman character's copyright, demanded she stop using the character in 1981. She did so, using instead a new character, Superwoman, who was marked by the inclusion of a large letter S on her cape; apparently DC Comics, which trademarked the character in 1947, was either unaware of, or unconcerned by this use.

Jorgensen continued her act, performing at Freddy's Supper Club on the Upper East Side of Manhattan until at least 1982 when she performed twice in the Hollywood area: once at the Backlot Theatre, adjacent to the discothèque Studio One, and later at The Frog Pond restaurant. In 1984, Jorgensen returned to Copenhagen to perform her show and was featured in Teit Ritzau's Danish transgender documentary film Paradiset er ikke til salg (Paradise Is Not for Sale). Jorgensen was the first and only known trans woman to perform at Oscar's Delmonico Restaurant in downtown New York, for which owners Oscar and Mario Tucci received criticism.

She died of bladder and lung cancer on May 3, 1989, at age 62. Her ashes were scattered off Dana Point, California.

== Legacy ==
Jorgensen's highly publicized transition helped bring to light gender identity and shaped a new culture of more inclusive ideas about the subject. As a transgender spokesperson and public figure, she influenced other transgender people to change their sex and names on their birth certificates. Jorgensen saw herself as a founding member in what became known as the "sexual revolution". In a 1988 Los Angeles Times interview, Jorgensen stated, "I am very proud now, looking back, that I was on that street corner 36 years ago when a movement started. It was the sexual revolution that was going to start with or without me. We may not have started it, but we gave it a good swift kick in the pants."

In 2012, Jorgensen was inducted into Chicago's Legacy Walk, an outdoor public display celebrating LGBTQ history and people.

In 2014, Jorgensen was one of the inaugural honorees in the Rainbow Honor Walk, a walk of fame in San Francisco's Castro neighborhood, noting LGBTQ people who have "made significant contributions in their fields".

In June 2019, Jorgensen was one of the inaugural 50 American "pioneers, trailblazers, and heroes" included on the National LGBTQ Wall of Honor within the Stonewall National Monument (SNM) in New York City's Stonewall Inn. The SNM is the first U.S. national monument dedicated to LGBTQ rights and history, and the wall's unveiling was timed to take place during the 50th anniversary of the Stonewall riots.

== In popular culture ==
During the 1950s, entrepreneurs and romantic partners Chuck Renslow and Dom Orejudos founded Kris Studios, a male physique photography studio that took photos for beefcake magazines they published, which was named in part to honor Jorgensen as a transgender pioneer. Kris Studios' photos are housed at the Leather Archives & Museum.

Posters for the Ed Wood film Glen or Glenda (1953), also known as I Changed My Sex and I Led Two Lives, publicize the movie as being based on Jorgensen's life. Originally producer George Weiss made her some offers to appear in the film, but she turned them down. Jorgensen is mentioned in connection with Glen or Glenda in Tim Burton's biopic Ed Wood (1994), but Jorgensen is not depicted as a character.

In 1954, during his earlier career as a calypso singer under the name The Charmer, Nation of Islam leader Louis Farrakhan recorded a song about Jorgensen, "Is She Is or Is She Ain't". (The title is a play on the 1940s Louis Jordan song, "Is You Is or Is You Ain't My Baby".)

The Christine Jorgensen Story, a fictionalized biopic based on Jorgensen's memoir, premiered in 1970. John Hansen played Jorgensen as an adult, while Trent Lehman played her at age seven.

In Christine Jorgensen Reveals, a stage performance at the 2005 Edinburgh Festival Fringe, Jorgensen was portrayed by Bradford Louryk. To critical acclaim, Louryk dressed as Jorgensen and performed in a recorded interview with her during the 1950s. At the same time, a video of Rob Grace as comically inept interviewer Nipsey Russell played on a nearby black-and-white television set. The show went on to win Best Aspect of Production at the 2006 Dublin Gay Theatre Festival, and it ran Off-Broadway at New World Stages in January 2006. The LP was reissued on CD by Repeat The Beat Records in 2005.

Transgender historian and critical theorist Susan Stryker directed and produced an experimental documentary about Jorgensen, titled Christine in the Cutting Room. In 2010 she also presented a lecture at Yale University titled "Christine in the Cutting Room: Christine Jorgensen's Transsexual Celebrity and Cinematic Embodiment". Both works examine embodiment vis-à-vis cinema.

Journalist Claudia Kalb's 2016 book Andy Warhol Was a Hoarder: Inside the Minds of History's Great Personalities devotes a chapter to Jorgensen's story, using her as an example of gender dysphoria and the process of gender transition in the 20th century.

The Christine Jorgensen Show is a 2024 play with music.

In Monster: The Ed Gein Story (2025), the third season of the Monster anthology series, Jorgensen is portrayed by Alanna Darby.

== Discography ==
=== Single ===
- "Crazy Little Men" / "Nervous Jervis" (Jolt Records, 1957)

=== Album ===
- Reveals [non-musical recording, interview] (J Records, 1958)

== Books ==
- Jorgensen, Christine (1967). Christine Jorgensen: A Personal Autobiography. New York, New York: Bantam Books. ISBN 978-1-57344-100-1.

== See also ==
- Xie Jianshun, Taiwanese intersex soldier who was often called "Chinese Christine"
