= Nanny and the Professor =

American television show

- Genre: Sitcom
- Created by: A. J. Carothers; Thomas L. Miller
- Starring: Juliet Mills; Richard Long; David Doremus; Trent Lehman; Kim Richards
- Theme music composer: George Greeley
- Opening theme: "Nanny", written and sung by The Addrisi Brothers
- Composers: Charles Fox; Arthur Morton; Sidney Fine
- Country of origin: United States
- Original language: English
- No. of seasons: 3
- No. of episodes: 54

Production
- Producer: Charles B. Fitzsimons
- Camera setup: Single-camera
- Running time: 30 min.
- Production company: 20th Century-Fox Television

Original release
- Network: ABC
- Release: January 21, 1970 – December 27, 1971

Nanny and the Professor is an early 1970s American sitcom created by AJ Carothers and Thomas L. Miller for 20th Century-Fox Television that aired on ABC from January 21, 1970, until December 27, 1971. During pre-production, the proposed title was Nanny Will Do.

== Premise ==
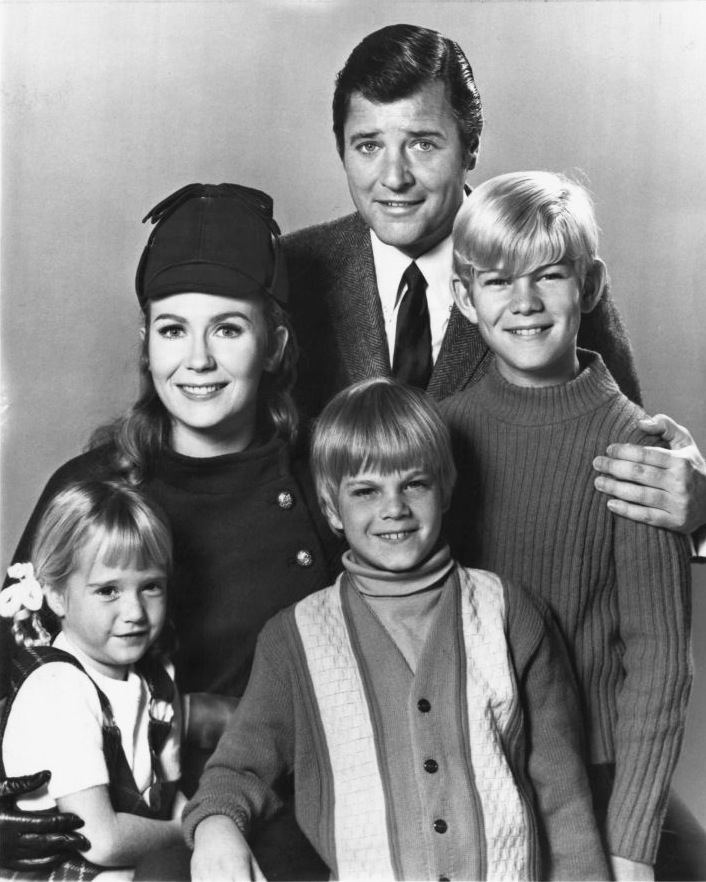
(clockwise from top) Richard Long, David Doremus, Trent Lehman, Kim Richards and Juliet Mills

Playing upon the popularity of Mary Poppins and other magical nannies of literature, this TV series posited another ostensibly magical British nanny taking care of a family in need of guidance. Unlike the candid "magicality" of its forebears, this nanny's paranormal nature was less overt and only implied. The Nanny's young wards, and the audience, were left intentionally uncertain of the nature of Nanny's "powers", if any.

The series starred Juliet Mills as Nanny Phoebe Figalilly, Richard Long as Professor Harold Everett, and in season 3 Elsa Lanchester in the recurring role of Aunt Henrietta. Figalilly is the housekeeper for Professor Everett and nanny to his three children: Hal, the intellectual tinkerer, played by David Doremus; Butch, the middle child, played by Trent Lehman; and Prudence, the youngest, played by Kim Richards.

Nanny is apparently psychic, and has regular flashes of what is often more than intuition (accented by a musical tinkling sound effect); she frequently knows who is at the door before the doorbell even rings. There is the vague suggestion that she may be at least several hundred years old and more than human, which the children think they have discovered in an episode after they see a photo of Nanny's aunt, taken a century earlier, who looks exactly like her. On outings, Nanny wears a navy blue Inverness cape and cap that resembled a deerstalker; the program's opening titles showed animations of both. Midway through the first season, Nanny and the kids restore a broken down 1930 Model A Ford, which Nanny names "Arabella". For some reason, the car's radio can only pick up radio broadcasts from 1930.

The location of the series is never named. In two episodes it is mentioned that Everett is a professor at fictional Collier University.

Following the show's cancellation, two animated adaptations of the series (Nanny and the Professor and Nanny and the Professor and the Phantom of the Circus) aired as part of The ABC Saturday Superstar Movie. All of the principal cast members provided voices for their respective characters.

== Main cast ==
- "Nanny" Phoebe Figalilly (Juliet Mills), a beautiful young British woman who shows up unannounced at the Everett household to look after the Professor's children. Though she gives no references, Everett affords Phoebe the customary six-week probationary period to see what she can do. At first her antics seem odd to the family, especially Hal, who calls her a "weirdo", but she soon endears herself to the three kids and Everett himself. Phoebe (who prefers to be called "Nanny") claims to be neither clairvoyant nor magical, but appears to have a sixth sense about many things (accented by a tinkling sound whenever her senses assert themselves), including knowing the names of people she has never met, communicating with animals and, most frequently, knowing someone is at the front door or on the telephone prior to the doorbell or telephone ringing.
- Professor Harold Everett (Richard Long), a widower and mathematics teacher at Collier University. Everett's three children are so rambunctious that he cannot retain a nanny to take care of them; In the first episode, the family has gone through five different au pairs in less than a year before Nanny's arrival. Although the Professor soon admits Nanny is doing a very good job, his skepticism and Nanny's lack of references maintain his doubts as to whether she will work out, added to which the sheer implausibility of the many strange things that have happened since Nanny's arrival contradict Everett's discipline of practicality. Initially he spends most of his time working, but with Nanny's subtle prompting he begins to spend more and more time with his children. As the series progressed, there were increasingly subtle suggestions of a romantic interest developing between Everett and Nanny, though the producers may have changed their minds, given the events of the episode "Chomondeley Featherstonehaugh" in which the eponymous character arives and is described as Phoebe's long-standing fiance, to whom she says that she is devoted, but cannot marry because the Everetts need her.
- Harold "Hal" Everett Jr. (David Doremus), the oldest of the Everett kids, Hal is of above average intelligence and takes after his father's practical and skeptical persona; the two often play chess together. Hal is also a tinkerer and inventor, though his experiments often go awry; one of his inventions is a prototype of what would later become known as The Clapper.
- Bentley "Butch" Everett (Trent Lehman), the middle child and Hal's younger brother, who hates his real name and, when he's not eating, enjoys sports and is an occasional prankster; He unsuccessfully attempts to frighten Nanny by hiding his pet guinea pig in her bag. Butch harbors jealousy and envy of Hal and has a penchant for following in his footsteps whenever Hal takes up a new career choice, though in one episode the tables are briefly turned when, after he mimics Hal's stargazing, he accidentally discovers a new comet and the Bureau of Astronomics decide to name the comet after him.
- Prudence Everett (Kim Richards), the youngest of the Everett kids and the Professor's only daughter. Prudence immediately takes a liking to Nanny when she first arrives.
- Mrs. Fowler (Patsy Garrett) (recurring), the Everetts' sometimes nosy neighbor.
- Francine Fowler (Eileen Baral) (recurring), Mrs. Fowler's daughter and classmate of Hal. Francine has a terrible crush on Hal.
- Waldo, the family dog, an Old English Sheepdog

== Episodes ==
=== Season 1 (1970) ===
No. overall	No. in season	Title	Directed by	Written by	Original release date
1	1	"Nanny Will Do"	Peter Tewksbury	A.J. Carothers	January 21, 1970
2	2	"The Wiblet Will Get You If You Don't Watch Out"	Russ Mayberry	A.J. Carothers	January 28, 1970
3	3	"The New Butch"	David Alexander	George Tibbles	February 4, 1970
4	4	"The Scientific Approach"	Norman Abbott	John McGreevey	February 11, 1970
5	5	"The Astronomers"	Norman Abbott	Joseph Bonaduce	February 18, 1970
6	6	"Spring, Sweet Spring"	Russ Mayberry	A.J. Carothers	February 25, 1970
7	7	"Nanny on Wheels"	Gary Nelson	Austin Kalish & Irma Kalish	March 4, 1970
8	8	"Strictly for the Birds"	Gary Nelson	John McGreevey	March 11, 1970
9	9	"The Tyrannosaurus Tibia"	Richard Kinon	Earl Hamner	March 18, 1970
10	10	"I Think That I Shall Never See a Tree"	Jay Sandrich	Joanna Lee	March 25, 1970
11	11	"The Games Families Play"	Richard Kinon	Rick Mittleman	April 1, 1970
12	12	"An Element of Risk"	Gary Nelson	John McGreevey	April 8, 1970
13	13	"The Philosopher's Stone"	Jerry Bernstein	Joanna Lee	April 15, 1970
14	14	"A Fowl Episode"	Richard Kinon	Earl Hamner	April 22, 1970
15	15	"Nanny and the Smoke-Filled Room"	William Wiard	Lila Garrett and Bernie Kahn	April 29, 1970

=== Season 2 (1970–71) ===
No. overall	No. in season	Title	Directed by	Written by	Original release date
16	1	"The Human Element"	Jack Arnold	Arthur Alsberg & Don Nelson	September 25, 1970
17	2	"The Haunted House"	Gary Nelson	Earl Hamner	October 2, 1970
18	3	"Star Bright"	David Alexander	Joseph Hoffman	October 9, 1970
19	4	"E.S. Putt"	Ralph Senensky	Robert Fisher & Arthur Marx	October 16, 1970
20	5	"Back to Nature"	Ralph Senensky	John McGreevey	October 23, 1970
21	6	"A Letter for Nanny"	Jay Sandrich	Gene Thompson	October 30, 1970
22	7	"The Great Broadcast of 1936"	Jay Sandrich	Arthur Alsberg & Don Nelson	November 6, 1970
23	8	"The Masculine-Feminine Mystique"	Gary Nelson	Joanna Lee	November 13, 1970
24	9	"The India Queen"	Ralph Senensky	Paul West	November 20, 1970
25	10	"The Visitor"	Gary Nelson	Earl Hamner	December 4, 1970
26	11	"My Son, the Sitter"	Bruce Bilson	Arthur Alsberg & Don Nelson	December 11, 1970
27	12	"From Butch, with Love"	Ralph Senensky	Robert Mosher	December 18, 1970
28	13	"The Humanization of Herbert T. Peabody"	Ralph Senensky	Joanna Lee	December 25, 1970
29	14	"A Diller, a Dollar"	Gary Nelson	Jean Holloway	January 8, 1971
30	15	"Separate Rooms"	Gary Nelson	Arthur Alsberg & Don Nelson	January 15, 1971
31	16	"The Human Fly"	Richard Kinon	A.J. Carothers	January 22, 1971
32	17	"The Man Who Came to Pasta"	Jack Arnold	Joanna Lee	January 29, 1971
33	18	"The Art of Relationships"	Bruce Bilson	A.J. Carothers	February 5, 1971
34	19	"The Balloon Ladies"	Richard Kinon	A.J. Carothers	February 12, 1971
35	20	"The Prodigy"	Bruce Bilson	Gene Thompson	February 19, 1971
36	21	"How Many Candles?"	David Alexander	Juliet Mills	February 26, 1971
37	22	"The Unknown Factor"	Gary Nelson	John McGreevey	March 5, 1971
38	23	"Kid Stuff"	Gary Nelson	John McGreevey	March 12, 1971
39	24	"The Communication Gap"	Russ Mayberry	Michael Morris	March 26, 1971

=== Season 3 (1971) ===
No. overall	No. in season	Title	Directed by	Written by	Original release date
40	1	"Oh, What a Tangled Web"	Bruce Bilson	Joanna Lee	September 13, 1971
41	2	"The Flower Children"	Richard L. Bare	Robert Mosher	September 20, 1971
42	3	"Sunday's Hero"	Bruce Bilson	Arthur Alsberg & Don Nelson	September 27, 1971
43	4	"South Sea Island Sweetheart"	Richard Kinon	A.J. Carothers	October 4, 1971
44	5	"Aunt Henrietta's Premonition"	Richard L. Bare	A.J. Carothers	October 11, 1971
45	6	"Cholmondeley Featherstonehaugh"	Richard Kinon	Jean Holloway	October 18, 1971
46	7	"Aunt Henrietta and the Jinx"	Norman Abbott	Gene Thompson	October 25, 1971
47	8	"Nanny and Her Witch's Brew"	Richard Kinon	Albert E. Lewin	November 1, 1971
48	9	"The Conversion of Brother Ben"	Hollingsworth Morse	Arthur Alsberg & Don Nelson	November 8, 1971
49	10	"Aunt Henrietta and the Poltergeist"	Richard Kinon	A.J. Carothers	November 15, 1971
50	11	"Professor Pygmalion Plays Golf"	Ralph Senensky	John McGreevey	November 22, 1971
51	12	"The Great Debate"	Hollingsworth Morse	Michael Morris	November 29, 1971
52	13	"One for the Road"	Bruce Bilson	Arthur Alsberg & Don Nelson	December 6, 1971
53	14	"Good-bye, Arabella, Hello"	Bruce Bilson	Arthur Alsberg & Don Nelson	December 13, 1971
54	15	"Whatever Happened to Felicity?"	Bruce Bilson	Austin & Irma Kalish	December 27, 1971

== Nanny's relatives ==
From time to time, some of Nanny's eccentric relatives (and some Nanny claimed as relatives because they were everybody's uncle) dropped by the Everett home for a visit. They include:

- Uncle Alfred (portrayed by John Mills, Juliet Mills's father), an eccentric who enthralls the Everett children with his wonderful stories and human flying act in his visit in "The Human Fly".
- Aunt Justine (portrayed by Ida Lupino) and Aunt Agatha (portrayed by Marjorie Bennett), two of Nanny's loveable aunts who draw a mob of reporters, tourists and "Women's Libbers" when they descend on the Everetts, quite literally, in a balloon in "The Balloon Ladies".
- Uncle Horace (portrayed by Ray Bolger), Nanny's roguish uncle, an old charmer, just back from the South seas, finds himself in great demand as rainmaker in Nanny's drought-stricken town during his visit in "South Sea Island Sweetheart".
- Aunt Henrietta (portrayed by Elsa Lanchester), an eccentric grand dame who arrives in town with her circus and a disturbing premonition that Nanny is about to be carried off by a mustachioed stranger in "Aunt Henrietta's Premonition." She later appeared in "Aunt Henrietta and the Jinx" during a battle between reason and superstition and returned again in "Aunt Henrietta and the Poltergeist" helping to get rid of a ghost.
- Aunt Arabella, Nanny's aunt and the inspiration for the nickname of Nanny's antique 1930 Ford Model A automobile in "Nanny on Wheels".
- Nanny had a lookalike great-aunt (seen only in a photograph) who lived to a ripe old age (she was born in October - a Libra).
- During Nanny's wedding to Cholmondeley Featherstonehaugh (pronounced "Chumley Fanshaw"), she found a note from her mother tucked in her great-great-great-grandmother's wedding gown that told her to only marry if she was truly in love. Nanny took the advice of the note and called off the wedding.

== Ratings and cancellation ==
The series first aired as a mid-season replacement on January 21, 1970, on ABC, with the final episode broadcast on December 27, 1971. The series enjoyed initial success due to its Friday night timeslot when it was scheduled between The Brady Bunch and The Partridge Family, which were shows aimed at similar demographics (largely young children and pre-teens). Ratings suffered in the third season when ABC moved the series to Monday night opposite Gunsmoke and Rowan & Martin's Laugh-In. After the series was canceled, it was seen in syndication until the mid 1970s. It was also one of the first shows rerun on FX Network in 1994. The show was added to getTV's lineup in May 2016 for a short time. The show also appeared briefly on Nick@Nite.
