= Five Finger Exercise (play) =

1958 play by Peter Shaffer

Five Finger Exercise, produced in 1958, is the first play written by Peter Shaffer. It depicts a dysfunctional English family in which the father's philistinism is in conflict with the aesthetic sensibilities of the son and the aspirations of the snobbish mother. The position is complicated by the feelings of the mother and the son towards the daughter's young German tutor. The play was later adapted for the cinema under the same title and has been adapted for radio.

== Premiere ==
The play, directed by John Gielgud, opened at the Arts Theatre, Cambridge on 30 June 1958, before being presented at the Comedy Theatre, London, on 16 July, running there for 607 performances.

=== Cast ===
- Stanley Harrington – Roland Culver
- Louise Harrington, his wife – Adrianne Allen
- Clive Harrington, their son, aged nineteen – Brian Bedford
- Pamela Harrington, their daughter, aged fourteen – Juliet Mills
- Walter Langer, aged twenty-two, tutor to Pamela – Michael Bryant

Source: The Stage.

== Plot ==
The play is set in the Harrington family's weekend cottage in Suffolk. Stanley Harrington is a self-made and extremely prosperous manufacturer of furniture. He is wary of culture and cannot understand his son, who has just become an undergraduate at Cambridge. Both the father and son feel isolated and are unhappy. Clive recoils equally from the boorish attitude of his father and the suffocating excess of maternal love from his mother. Louise Harrington is a social and intellectual snob who dabbles in culture. Pamela is a fairly cheerful and relatively normal schoolgirl.

Walter, Pamela's tutor, is the catalyst bringing the family's suppressed resentments to the surface, leading to frank exchanges and potential reconciliation. Louise blames Stanley for suppressing her creative aspirations; Stanley pooh-poohs Clive's pursuit of a meaningful life beyond the family business; Pamela believes Clive is over-indulged; Clive feels unappreciated and misunderstood. Walter, who has fled from Nazi-sympathising parents, is grateful for the security and acceptance he has found with the Harringtons. By engaging with each family member, Walter helps them gain a perspective on the issues facing each of them, guiding them towards resolution. He exemplifies the qualities to which Clive aspires: independence, education, self-sufficiency, and artistic inclination, balanced by self-acceptance.

Tensions increase when Clive, envious of his mother's fondness for Walter (to whom he feels a half-suppressed gay attraction) mendaciously tells Stanley that Louise and Walter are having an affair. In fact Walter is seeking a mother-substitute rather than a lover, although Louise has other ideas. She turns against Walter and insists on his dismissal. His pleas to remain with the family are rebuffed.

Louise discovers Clive's deceit and spurns his apology in a heated argument. In a dramatic climax Walter attempts suicide by gas inhalation in his bedroom. The family members rally to save him, recognising the profound impact he has had on their lives. They successfully revive him and the play concludes with Clive praying for courage for all of them.

== Revivals and adaptations ==
The American producer Frederick Brisson saw the play in London along with his wife, Rosalind Russell. He recalled:

As Five Finger Exercise unfolded, a thrill of excitement ran up my spine and I could sense that the same thing was happening to Rosalind and to the audience. Before it was over, I had decided that I wanted to bring this honest and moving first play by Peter Shaffer to America.

The production, directed by Gielgud, featured the London cast, with the exception of Adrianne Allen, who was replaced by Jessica Tandy. The play ran in New York for 337 performances from 2 December 1959.

Russell played Louise Harrington in the film adaptation of the play, released in 1962.

The play has been adapted for broadcasting by the BBC. In 1964 Margaretta Scott headed the cast in a radio version, with Ronald Ward, David Valla, Isabel Rennie and Andrew Sachs

== Reception ==
Notices for the play were good, with a few reservations about details. The Times thought that among recent plays showing family generational clashes "Five Finger Exercise … has the greatest claim to distinction [with] dialogue of a lightly rippling subtlety which holds the attention of the house continuously". The reviewer thought that Shaffer successfully brought to life the aggrieved younger generation, but was less convincing with the parents. The Stage praised the play's "compelling sincerity" and judged it "in many respects the best written, the best acted and best produced play seen in the West End for a long time" and added, "The dialogue has flow, character and, in dramatic moments, economy; the gradual, natural unfolding completely holds the attention; the penetration and human understanding, to the point where even the Philistine father is revealed as a man of feeling, are of a rare quality".

== Sources ==
- Brisson, Frederick (1959). "Preface". Five Finger Exercise. New York: Harcourt Brace. OCLC 654741439.
- Gaye, Freda, ed. (1967). Who's Who in the Theatre (fourteenth ed.). London: Sir Isaac Pitman and Sons. OCLC 5997224.
