= Christine Jorgensen Reveals =

2005 American theatrical show

- Original language: English
- Characters: Christine Jorgensen and Nipsey Russell
- Genre: Play

Premiere
- Date: 2005
- Place: Edinburgh, Scotland: Edinburgh Festival Fringe

Christine Jorgensen Reveals is a 2005 American theatrical show that depicts the 1957 one-hour interview of Christine Jorgensen by Nipsey Russell. This was billed as her "only recorded interview", though she had actually participated in recorded interviews with Tom Snyder, Dick Cavett, Joe Pyne, and others. The show begins with a brief documentary. Then, Jorgensen's entire interview is lip synched by the two actors. The show received a generally positive critical response and earned the 2006 Drama Desk Award for Unique Theatrical Experience. It has been mounted several times since its 2005 Off-Broadway production.

== Background ==
At the time of the interview, Jorgensen, the first celebrity transsexual, was considered to be the most famous woman in the world, according to critics from The Guardian and Broadwayworld.com and one of the most famous according to other sources, such as The New York Times. On December 1, 1952, the New York Daily News ran a front-page story of her operation, and her February 12, 1953, return to the United States at Idlewild Airport was the largest press gathering in history to that date. In 1952, she had gone to Denmark to have sex reassignment surgery and hormone treatment to change sexes at a Copenhagen hospital. In the 1957, the interview of Jorgensen by comedian Nipsy Russell was produced as an LP record.

Bradford Louryk stumbled across the LP in a used record store. He recalled, "there she was in that green dress on this great cover, which made me want to pick it up. And written on the cover were all these leading questions, like 'is she a woman?' 'can she have children?' and things like that." He created the show and finally got it produced a few years later.

== Description ==
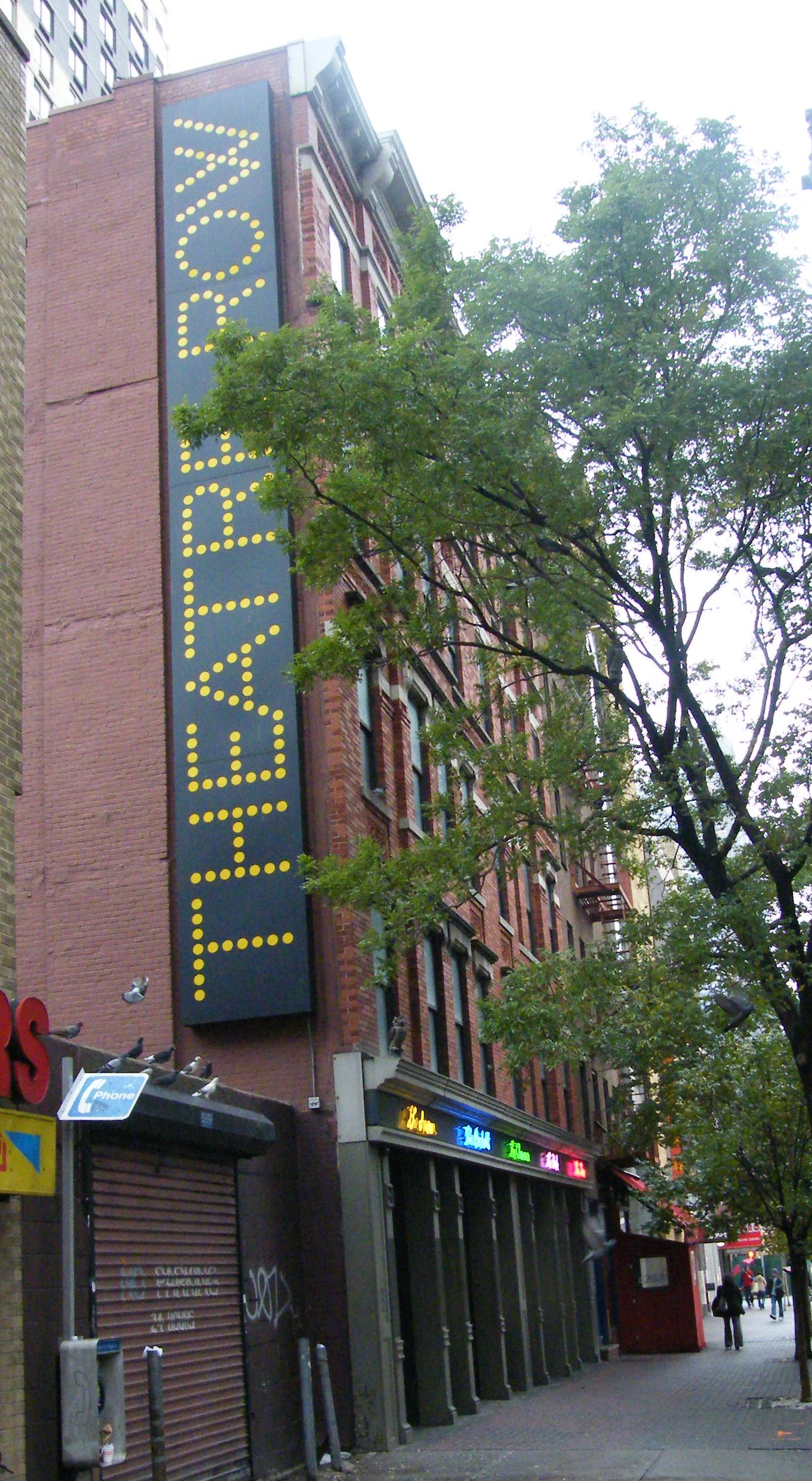
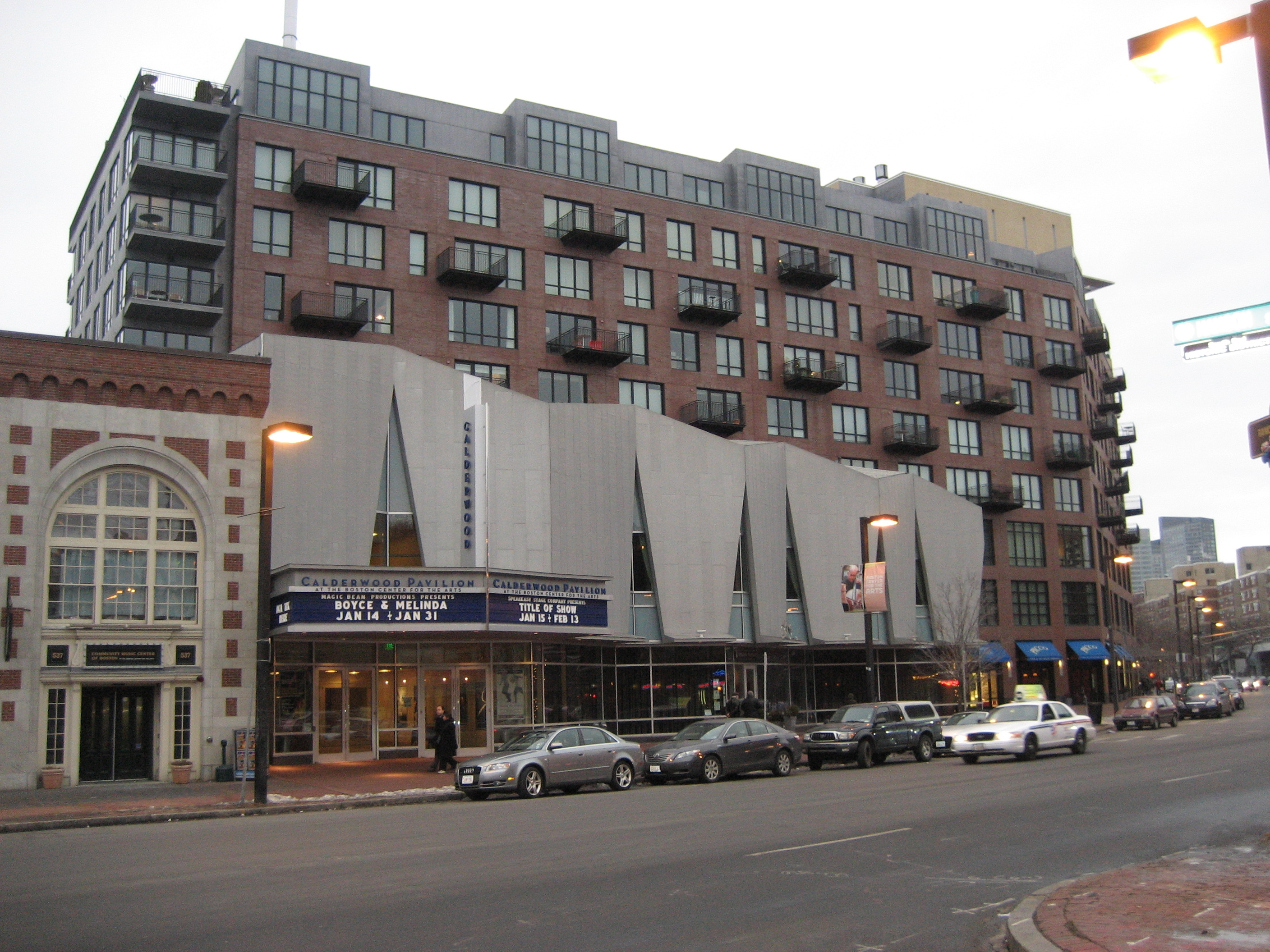
Christine Jorgensen Reveals had performance runs at Theatre Row (top) in Manhattan and Calderwood Pavilion (bottom) in Boston.

The show begins with a brief documentary. Then, Jorgensen's entire interview is lip synched by the two actors, who "at the same time [provide a] visual counterpart to every phoneme, snort, scratch, or hesitation". The Jorgensen character sits next to a television that plays a recording of the interview, with a microphone hanging overhead, as in a TV studio. Jorgenson is portrayed as "beautiful, intelligent and media-savvy". Nipsey Russell, an African American, is played "in prerecorded video form" by a white actor. The young Russell is depicted in the entertainment as a credulous, star-struck interviewer who asks "oft naïve or prurient questions". At times he is also "appalled" and "seductive". The interview runs about 50 minutes.

== Performance history ==
The show premiered in New York City in 2005 at the 59E59 Theaters, Dodger Stages and the Edinburgh Festival, before a 2006 engagement on Theatre Row. It starred Bradford Louryk as Jorgensen, was directed by Josh Hecht and produced by Greg Tully. Russell was portrayed by the white actor Rob Grace. It was then produced in Boston, a week after closing in New York, at the Calderwood Pavilion. Subsequently, the show went to Dublin before returning to New York City in 2009 for a return engagement at The Lion Theatre on 42nd Street, again starring Louryk.

== Critical response ==
The show "makes compelling viewing" and is "stylishly staged", according to The Guardian. Critics praised Louryk's performance in the title role. The Boston Phoenix reviewer called the show "something between a docudrama, an elegant drag show, and a sedentary ballet ... what Christine Jorgensen reveals is just how much of a performance traditional gender specificity can be." The New York Times regarded the performance as "meticulous", commenting that the title character "articulates ideas about gender and homosexuality that sound well ahead of her time, while also projecting a demure model of femininity that seems distinctly of the 1950s." Nytheatre.com commented that the entertainment "is a grand example of the impact performance can have in taking a single event in time and memorializing it in the best and strongest way possible, enabling that moment to survive and continue to affect the world in new and different ways around each corner."

=== Awards and nominations ===
Award	Outcome
2006 Drama Desk Awards
Unique Theatrical Experience	Won
2006 GLAAD Media Awards
Outstanding New York Theater: Off-Off-Broadway: Bradford Louryk	Nominated

Other accolades include The Hilton Edwards Award for Outstanding Production, The Micheal MacLiammoir Award for Best Actor, and an IRNE Award nomination for Best Play.
