= Trent Lehman =

American actor (1961–1982)

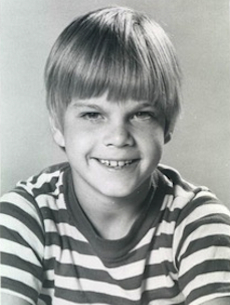
- Trent Lehman, circa 1970
- Born: Trenton Lawson Lehman; February 23, 1961; Los Angeles, California, U.S.
- Died: January 18, 1982 (aged 20); Pacoima, California, U.S.
- Occupation: Actor
- Years active: 1969–1973

Trenton Lawson "Trent" Lehman (February 23, 1961 – January 18, 1982) was an American child actor.

== Early life and career ==
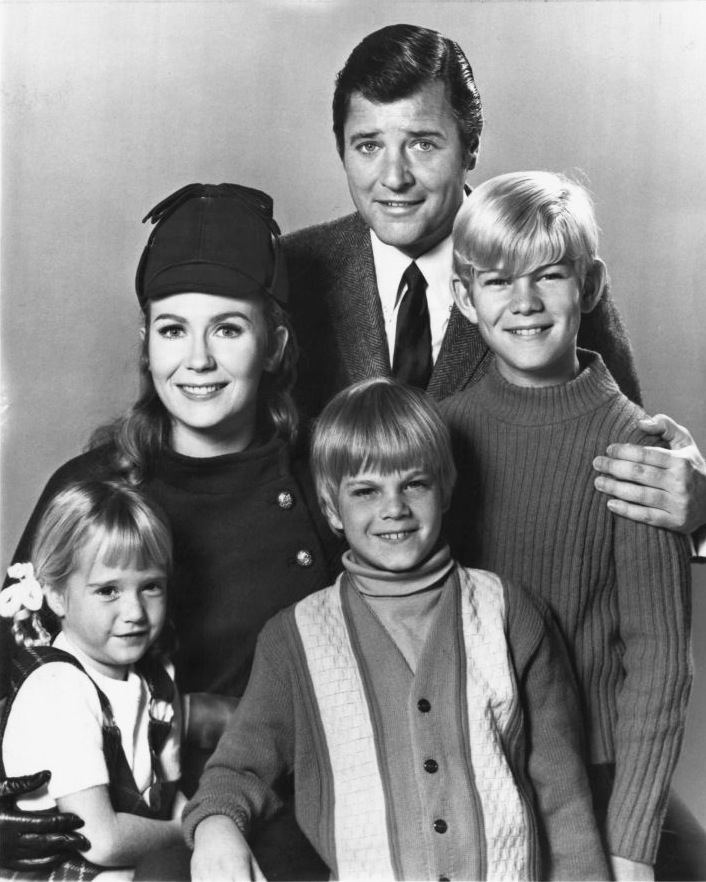
Nanny and the Professor cast 1970 (clockwise from top) Richard Long, David Doremus, Lehman, Kim Richards and Juliet Mills

Lehman, who was raised in the Los Angeles neighborhood of Arleta, was best known for his role as impish middle child Bentley "Butch" Everett on the 70's sitcom Nanny and the Professor. Prior to landing his most famous role, he also played a young Christine Jorgensen in The Christine Jorgensen Story, and appeared in episodes of Gunsmoke and Emergency!.

Lehman's last credited role was in 1973. Twelve years old, he was having difficulty finding work, which led to bouts of depression. His mother moved their family to Colorado later in the decade, but Lehman decided to return to California, resettling in an apartment in North Hollywood.

== Death ==
Days before Lehman died, he reconnected with Joseph Allen, a classmate of his from Vena Avenue Elementary School in Pacoima, California. Allen told police that Lehman had asked him for a gun as he had become despondent over breaking up with his girlfriend and a recent burglary of his apartment. Police had no knowledge of the burglary until after Lehman's death.

On January 18, 1982, Lehman died after he hanged himself on a chain link fence outside of Vena Avenue Elementary School. He had attended the school before being withdrawn to become an actor.

Lehman's death, along with those of two other former child actors, Rusty Hamer and Tim Hovey, inspired Paul Petersen to found A Minor Consideration, an advocacy group for child stars.

== Filmography ==
Year	Title	Role	Notes
1969	Gunsmoke	Chester	1 episode
1970	The Christine Jorgensen Story	George at 7	
1970–1971	Nanny and the Professor	Butch Everett	54 episodes
1972	Emergency!	Andy	1 episode
1972–1973	The ABC Saturday Superstar Movie	Butch Everett (Voice)	2 episodes
