= The Christine Jorgensen Story =

1970 film by Irving Rapper

- The Christine Jorgensen Story film poster.
- Directed by: Irving Rapper
- Written by: Robert E. Kent; Ellis St Joseph
- Based on: Christine Jorgensen, a Personal Autobiography
- Produced by: Edward Small
- Starring: John Hansen; Joan Tompkins; Quinn K. Redeker
- Cinematography: Jacques R. Marquette
- Edited by: R. A. Radecki
- Music by: Paul Sawtell; Bert Shefter
- Production company: Edward Small Productions
- Distributed by: United Artists
- Release date: June 24, 1970
- Running time: 89 minutes
- Country: United States
- Language: English
- Budget: approx $1 million
- Box office: $1.5 million (US/ Canada rentals)

The Christine Jorgensen Story is a 1970 American drama film and a fictionalized biographical film about trans woman Christine Jorgensen. While the overall premise of the film is accurate, many of the details are fictionalized for the continuity of the film. It was directed by Irving Rapper and based on Christine Jorgensen's autobiography.

== Plot ==
The film opens with a seven year old Christine Jorgensen, admiring a doll in a shop window. Boys from school come to mock her, calling her "Georgette" much to her chagrin. When she returns home later, she becomes frustrated that she has received a toy building set for Christmas while her sister, Dolly, received a doll. Their mother, Florence, begins to show concern for Christine's behavior, but following a fight at school her father, George, insists that she is growing out of her feminine nature and will someday be just like himself. Several years go by, and Christine remains certain that her father was wrong about her.

Through George's influence, Christine pursues a career in photography and while on a work trip to photograph swimsuit models she is assaulted by her male employer, Jess Warner, who accuses her of being a homosexual. Narrowly escaping, she rushes to a nearby pier and vents to one of the swimsuit models about her troubles. She insists she isn't homosexual, but does not know what to call herself. In combination with her conflicting jealous feelings regarding her sister's wedding, Christine begins to research sex and gender to make sense of her identity.

At the library she finds a book which she believes holds the answers. While attending medical school, Christine meets the author, Professor Estabrook, during one of his lectures and asks him for help. The professor suggests to Christine she may be a "woman trapped in a man's body". The film reveals at this point that Christine was drafted into the army prior to starting post-secondary school, but was honorably discharged. She shares with the professor that her army days were filled with unpleasant memories.

Christine decides to go to Denmark under the guise of visiting her Aunt Thora to see a doctor about gender reassignment surgery. The surgery is a success and Christine decides to name herself after Aunt Thora's deceased daughter. Aunt Thora is thrilled and supports Christine’s lifestyle wholeheartedly. When word reaches the United States, Christine is a sensation - and the victim of ridicule. Christine's family back home is accepting and send word to Christine as much, minus her father who is struggling to understand. Dolly tells her father that they haven’t lost a son because Christine was never truly a boy to begin with. The local pastor also encourages George to open up his mind to Christine’s identity, but he still hesitates.

Back in Denmark, an American journalist, Tom Crawford, visits Christine with the promise of telling her story under her own terms and the two quickly become friends. Christine shares a memory of being in the army with him, when she was humiliated at a brothel by a female sex worker and other army members for not being attracted to women. Aunt Thora begins to notice chemistry between Christine and Tom and encourages Christine to pursue the relationship, but Christine refuses - not from a lack of affection for Tom but for fear of further scorn. After she dismisses Tom's article and tells him to return to the United States without her, Tom confesses his love to Christine. The two share a kiss and return to the United States where Christine's family is waiting for her at the airport. Her father hugs her and ignores the jeering press as the family walks together across the tarmac.

== Cast ==
- John Hansen as George Jorgensen, Jr./Christine Jorgensen
- Trent Lehman as George (child)
- John Himes as George Jorgensen Sr.
- Ellen Clark as Florence Jorgensen
- Joan Tompkins as Aunt Thora
- Quinn Redeker as Tom Crawford
- Pamelyn Ferdin as Dolly Jorgensen (child)
- Lynn Harper as Dolly Jorgensen
- Rod McCary as Jess Warner
- Elaine Joyce as Loretta (Homophobic Swimsuit Model)
- Joyce Meadows as Tani (Kind Swimsuit Model)
- Bill Erwin as Pastor
- Oscar Beregi Jr. as Dr. Victor Dahlman
- Will Kuluva as Professor Estabrook

== Production ==
A film based on the book was proposed in 1960. Edward Small bought the film rights in 1968. Jorgensen later claimed under the contract she would be entitled to 10% of the gross and 3.5% of the budget.

"Every female impersonator in the world came flying into Hollywood demanding he was Christine", said Jorgensen later. George/Christine is played by John Hansen.

Irving Rapper said Small gave him the job as director because it required someone who had sensitivity.

== Release ==
Roger Greenspun, reviewing the film for The New York Times on 25 July 1970, called the film "a minor jolt and a pleasant surprise", hailing it as "a quiet, even dignified little picture, handled professionally and tastefully, minus a touch of sensationalism." Greenspun singled out the smoothness of the story, its tone of "genteel restraint", the quality of the color photography and the economical use of settings, and Hansen's handling of the role with "absolute sincerity and a soft effusiveness." Greenspun concluded that the film is" essentially a decent film that says a bit and implies much about human courage, sensitivity and plain pluck."

The Washington Daily News said called the film's narrative unfolded in a "slow moving, stilted, amateurish but honest fashion and in good taste - the R (for Restricted) rating notwithstanding." The reviewer noted director Irving Rapper having executed the production with "a nice regard for soap opera techniques, such as the pregnant pauses, the long stares and full-faced close-ups," but ultimately concluded that the film was "not a movie for film buffs nor even for those just seeking entertainment."

Derek Malcolm, reviewing the film for The Guardian, described the film as a "sad little film" that failed to do justice to its subject matter, calling it a "cheap Hollywood weepie" that lacked emotional depth and was stifled by sensationalism.

Jorgensen later unsuccessfully tried to get a restraining order to stop Small's estate from exploiting the film, claiming Small diverted $100,000 owed to her for his own use. Jorgensen said she was worried United Artists would exploit the film as a B movie.

== Home media ==
The Christine Jorgensen Story was released on DVD by MGM Home Entertainment on October 12, 2011, through its Ultimate Collection DVD-on-demand service.

== See also ==
- List of American films of 1970
- Transgender in film and television
