= Juliet Mills =

English actress (born 1941)

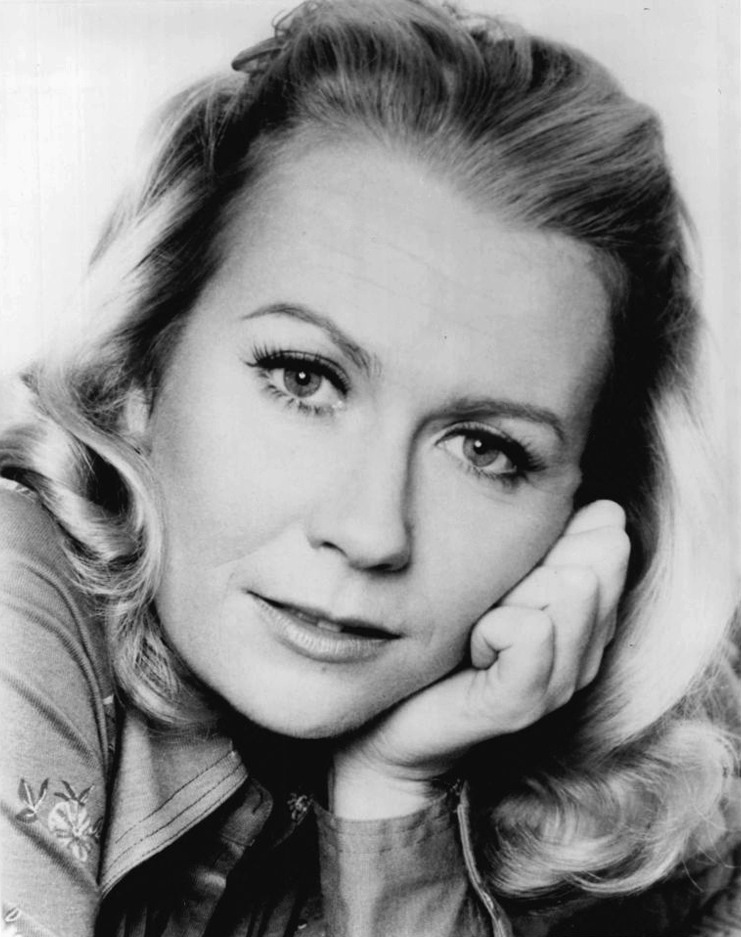
- Mills in 1974
- Born: Juliet Maryon Mills; 21 November 1941 (age 84); London, England
- Citizenship: United Kingdom; United States (1975)
- Occupation: Actress
- Years active: 1942–present
- Spouses: Russell Alquist Jr. (m. 1961; div. 1974) Michael Miklenda (m. 1975; div. 1980) Maxwell Caulfield (m. 1980)
- Children: 2
- Parents: Sir John Mills (father); Mary Hayley Bell (mother)
- Relatives: Hayley Mills (sister); Annette Mills (aunt); Susie Blake (cousin); Mark Weedon (cousin); Crispian Mills (nephew)
- Awards: Primetime Emmy Award for Outstanding Supporting Actress in a Limited Series or Movie; 1975 for QB VII

Juliet Maryon Mills (born 21 November 1941) is an English and American actress. The daughter of actor Sir John Mills and older sister of actress Hayley Mills, she began her career as a child actress and was nominated at age 18 for a Tony Award for her stage performance in Five Finger Exercise in 1960. She progressed to film work and then to television, playing the lead role on the sitcom Nanny and the Professor in the early 1970s. She received Golden Globe Award nominations for her work in this series and for her role in the film Avanti! in 1972. She won an Emmy Award for her performance in the television miniseries QB VII.

In 1983, Mills joined The Mirror Theater Ltd's Mirror Repertory Company, performing in repertory productions such as Rain, Paradise Lost, Inheritors and The Hasty Heart throughout their seasons. From 1999 until 2008, she starred as Tabitha Lenox on the television soap opera Passions, for which she was nominated for a Daytime Emmy Award.

== Early life ==
Mills was born on 21 November 1941 in London during World War II, though her parents, the actor John Mills and playwright Mary Hayley Bell, soon moved the family to the country to be away from the Luftwaffe bombing raids. She is the elder sister of the actress Hayley Mills and director Jonathan Mills.

Because of her parents' careers, Mills grew up surrounded by famous actors, including Rex Harrison, David Niven and Marlon Brando. She recalled her childhood in the 2000 documentary film Sir John Mills' Moving Memories, written by her brother. Her godmother was actress Vivien Leigh, and her godfather was playwright Noël Coward. She attended the Elmhurst Ballet School, in Camberley, Surrey.

== Career ==
As a child, Mills appeared as an extra in various films, including a credited role as Freda's 11-week-old baby in the 1942 film In Which We Serve, starring her father. In 1955, aged 14, while boarding at Elmhurst Ballet School, she appeared in a starring role as Alice in a London stage production of Alice Through the Looking Glass at the Chelsea Palace Theatre.

Her first major film role came in 1958, when she was 16, as Pamela Harrington in the Peter Shaffer play Five Finger Exercise. The show ran one year in London, and then moved to the Music Box Theatre on Broadway. In 1960, Mills was nominated for a Tony Award as "Best Featured Actress" for her performance as Pamela.

In 1961, Mills appeared as a stowaway, dressed as a man but the daughter of a ship's gunner, in episode 2 of Sir Francis Drake. This was one of her first TV appearances, and was echoed by an almost identical role in the 1964 film Carry On Jack.

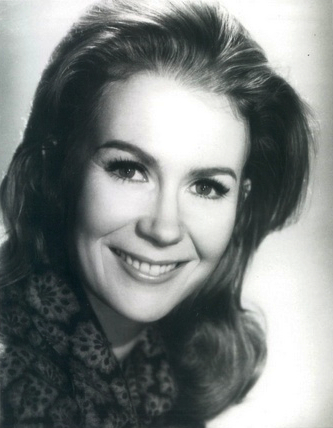
Publicity photo of Mills promoting the January 21, 1970 premiere of the television series Nanny and the Professor

In the 1960s, Mills would appear both in films and on television. She had a role in the film, The Rare Breed with James Stewart and Maureen O'Hara, and on television series such as The Man from U.N.C.L.E., Ben Casey and 12 O'Clock High. She has stated that the highlight of her film career was Avanti! (1972), directed by Billy Wilder, in which she starred opposite Jack Lemmon and for which she received a Golden Globe Award nomination in 1973. In 1974, Mills starred alongside fellow English actor Richard Johnson in the Italian horror film Beyond the Door, playing the role of Jessica Barrett, a woman who becomes demonically possessed after an unplanned pregnancy. The movie was a major success, making over $15 million at the box office, though the producers were sued by Warner Bros due to similarities to The Exorcist. Mills also appeared in a two-part 1978 episode of the TV series The Love Boat, playing Barbara Danver, wife of Alan Danver, played by Dan Rowan.

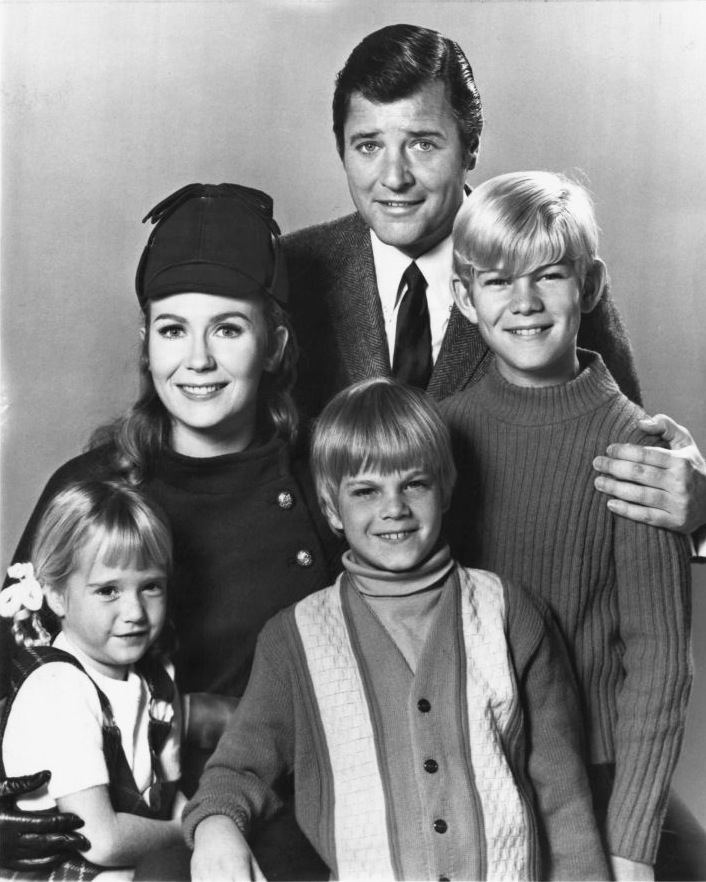
Nanny and the Professor cast 1970 (clockwise from top) Richard Long, David Doremus, Trent Lehman, Kim Richards and Mills

In 1969, Mills was cast in the American television series Nanny and the Professor, which premiered on ABC in January, 1970. Mills played Phoebe Figalilly, a nanny with seemingly magical powers, reminiscent of Mary Poppins. Mills has stated that she herself believes in magic, witches and fairies: "There's a lot more, you know, in the aether and around us ... We have guides, and we have angels taking care of us ... I believe in metaphysics, in a big way." She was again nominated for a Golden Globe Award in 1971 for the same role. Despite strong ratings, the series ran only for two seasons, in 1970 and 1971. After the show was moved from a timeslot near The Partridge Family and The Brady Bunch, two highly successful sitcoms, to a different night of the week, ratings fell eventually leading to its cancellation.

In 1974, Mills won an Emmy Award for "Outstanding Single Performance by a Supporting Actress in a Comedy or Drama Special" for her performance in the miniseries adaptation of QB VII. During the 1974–75 television season, she also had a recurring role as Dr. Claire Hanley on NBC's Born Free. In 1980, Mills returned to the stage, starring in The Elephant Man, with Maxwell Caulfield, who became her third husband.

Mills was the subject of This Is Your Life in 1992, when she was surprised by Michael Aspel during the curtain call of the play Fallen Angels at the Richmond Theatre.

In 1999, Mills was cast on the daytime drama Passions as Tabitha Lenox, a witch who was burned at the stake in the 17th century. Initially, the character wished harm on other people, but in a June 2007 episode, the character was declared a "good witch". Mills was nominated for her first Daytime Emmy Award for "Outstanding Lead Actress" for the role.

Passions ended in August, 2008. In 2009, Mills joined the cast the ITV drama Wild at Heart, playing Georgina, the sister of a character played in the previous series by her real-life sister Hayley. She also guest-starred in two episodes of Hot in Cleveland as Philipa Scroggs, the mother of Joy (played by Jane Leeves).

== Personal life ==
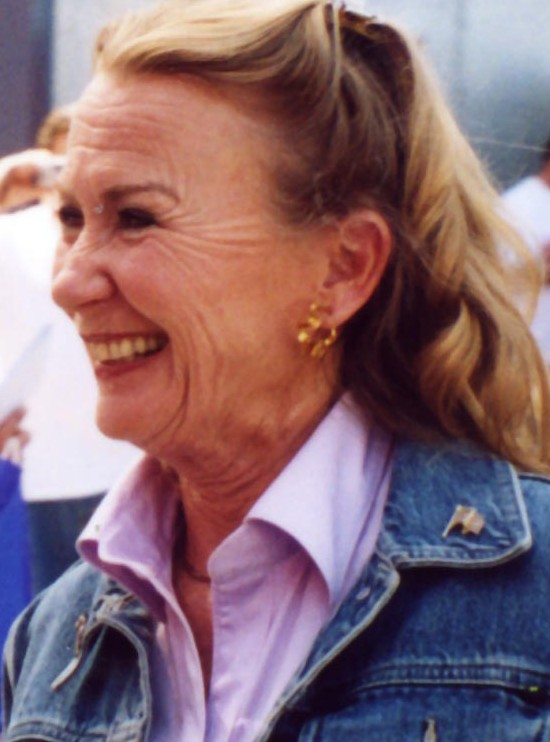
Mills in 2004

Mills has been married three times. The first time was from 1961 to 1964, to Russell Alquist, Jr., with whom she had a son. Her second marriage was from 1975 to 1980 to Michael Miklenda, with whom she had a daughter.

In 1980, Mills married Maxwell Caulfield, 18 years her junior. Mills said of the age difference, "Everybody is always interested in the fact that I am married to someone who is a lot younger than I am ... There are no rules, and that's what I believe, because age doesn't really matter. If you meet someone that you're really close to, someone that you love, stick with that."

Mills became an American citizen on October 10, 1975.

== Stage credits ==
Year	Title	Role	Theatre
1955	Alice Through the Looking Glass	Alice	Chelsea Palace Theatre
1958	Five Finger Exercise	Pamela Harrington	Comedy Theatre
1960	Peter Pan	Wendy Darling	Scala Theatre
1962	The Glad and Sorry Season	Kitty	Piccadilly Theatre
1963	A Midsummer Night's Dream	Titania	Royal Shakespeare Company
1964	The Knack ...and How to Get It		
1964–65	Alfie!	Gilda	Morosco Theatre
1966	Lady Windermere's Fan		Phoenix Theatre
1969	She Stoops to Conquer	Kate Hardcastle	Garrick Theatre
1976	The Mousetrap		U.S. tour
1979	Wait Until Dark	Susy Hendrix	Alcazar Theatre
1980	The Elephant Man	Fanny Kemble	Royal Poinsiana Playhouse
1980	The Heiress	Catherine Sloper	Nottingham Playhouse
1983	Rain		The Mirror Theater
1983–84	Paradise Lost	Pearl Gordon	The Mirror Theater
1984	Inheritors		The Mirror Theater
1985	The Hasty Heart		The Mirror Theater
1991	Dangerous Obsession	Sally Driscoll	Cape Cod Playhouse
1992–93	Fallen Angels		UK Tour
1995	The Cherry Orchard		Canadian tour
1995	The Moliere Comedies		
1995	Time of My Life	Laura Stratton	Williamstown Theatre Festival
1996	It Could Be Any One of Us	Jocelyn Polegate	The Old Laundry Theatre, Bowness-on-Windermere
1997	Blithe Spirit	Ruth	Lauren K. Woods Theatre
1998	Dial M for Murder		Cape Cod Playhouse
1999	Double Double	Philippa	UK Tour
2010	Bedroom Farce	Delia	UK Tour
2015	Legends!	Sylvia Glenn	Australian Tour
2019	The Lady Vanishes	Miss Froy	UK Tour
2022	Darker Shores	Mrs Hinchcliffe	UK Tour

== Filmography ==
Key
†	Denotes films that have not yet been released

=== Film ===
Year	Title	Role	Notes
1942	In Which We Serve	Freda's Baby	
1944	Tawny Pipit	Baby Girl	
1947	So Well Remembered	Young Julie	
1947	The October Man	Child on Bus	
1949	The History of Mr. Polly	Little Polly	
1961	No My Darling Daughter	Tansy Carr	
1962	Twice Round the Daffodils	Catty	
1963	Nurse on Wheels	Joanna Jones	
1964	Carry On Jack	Sally	
1966	The Rare Breed	Hilary Price	
1966	The Wrong Box	Woman on Train	Uncredited
1969	Oh! What a Lovely War	Nurse	
1972	Avanti!	Pamela Piggott	
1973	Jonathan Livingston Seagull	Marina (voice)	
1974	Beyond the Door	Jessica Barrett	
1976	The Second Power	Estefanía	
1992	Waxwork II: Lost in Time	The Defense Lawyer	
1999	The Other Sister	Winnie	
2014	Lucky Stiff	Miss Thorsby	
2014	Some Kind of Beautiful	Joan	
2018	Running for Grace	Grandmother	
2023	7000 Miles	Sharon	
2023	Metalocalypse: Army of the Doomstar	Whale (voice)	
2023	The Primevals	Claire Collier	Filmed in 1994
2023	Poolman	Mrs. Van Patterson	

=== Television ===
Year	Title	Role	Notes
1962	ITV Television Playhouse	Carol	Episode: "The Morning After"
1962	Man of the World	Carla	Episode: "The Mindreader"
1963	It Happened Like This	Joan	Episode: "Three of a Kind"
1965	The Man from U.N.C.L.E.	Eva	Episode: "The Adriatic Express Affair"
1966	Ben Casey	Joan Lloyd	Episode: "Pull the Wool Over Your Eyes, Here Comes the Cold Wind of Truth"
1966	A Man Called Shenandoah	Paula	Episode: "The Imposter"
1966	12 O'Clock High	Sydney Vivyan, Helen Conboy	Episode: "The Slaughter Pen" and "Siren Voices"
1966	Bob Hope Presents the Chrysler Theatre	Mary Lewis	Episode: "Time of Flight"
1967	The Revenue Men	Jill Lacey	Episode: "Borderline"
1967	Coronet Blue	Margaret Crowell	Episode: "Man Running"
1968	Sherlock Holmes	Grace Dunbar	Episode: "Thor Bridge"
1969	The Morecambe & Wise Show	Herself (guest star)	Her father, Sir John Mills, guest starred in a later series.
1970–71	Nanny and the Professor	Phoebe Figalilly	Lead role (54 episodes)
1971	Alias Smith and Jones	Julia Finney	Episode: "The Man Who Murdered Himself"
1971	Stage 2	Kate Hardcastle	Episode: "She Stoops to Conquer"
1973	The ABC Afternoon Playbreak	Susan Moroni	Episode: "Alone with Terror"
1974	Born Free	Dr. Claire Hanley	Episodes: "Pilot", "The Flying Doctor of Kenya"
1974	Harry O	Margaret Ballinger	Episode: "Ballinger's Choice"
1974–75	Match Game 74	Herself (celebrity panelist)	Multiple episodes
1975	Marcus Welby, M.D.	Louise Carpenter	Episode: "Public Secrets"
1975	Hawaii Five-O	Lady Sybil Danby	Episode: "Termination with Extreme Prejudice"
1975	The Wide World of Mystery	Isobel	Episode: "Demon, Demon"
1975	Matt Helm	Caroline Jeffries	Episode: "Death Rods"
1976	Ellery Queen	Florence Ames	Episode: "The Adventure of the Hardhearted Huckster"
1977	Wonder Woman	Queen Kathryn	Episode: "The Queen and the Thief"
1978	Switch	Alicia Alden	Episode: "Coronado Circle"
1978	Police Woman	Amy Hollis	Episode: "Sixth Sense"
1978–84	Fantasy Island	Various	4 episodes
1978–84	The Love Boat	Various	8 episodes
1980	Hart to Hart	Kate Matthews	Episode: "Downhill to Death"
1984	Dynasty	Rosalind Bedford	Episodes: "The Secret", "That Holiday Spirit"
1985	All My Children	Judge Edith Hogan	
1985	Hotel	Grace Cauldwell	Episode: "Fallen Idols"
1987	Murder, She Wrote	Annette Pirage	Episode: "Witness for the Defense"
1987	Hotel	Joanne Bentley	Episode: "Pitfalls"
1988	The Law & Harry McGraw	Isobel McKechnie	Episode: "Maginnis for the People"
1990	Monsters	Cara Raymond	Episode: "Outpost"
1992	Columbo	Eileen Hacker	Episode: "No Time to Die"
1998	Air America	Helen Vendler	Episode: "The Hit"
1999–2008	Passions	Tabitha Lenox	Main role (990 episodes)
2009	Wild at Heart	Georgina	Recurring role (8 episodes)
2010–15	Hot in Cleveland	Philipa	4 episodes
2014	From Here on OUT	Dottie Cooper	Regular (6 episodes)
2017	Time After Time	Mrs. Nelsen	Episode: "Pilot"
2017	Jeff & Some Aliens	Jessica (voice)	Episode: "Jeff & Some Love Simulations"
2017	Andi Mack	Millie	Episode: "Mama"
2021	TV Therapy	Nanny	Episode: "Nanny"
2022	Big Mouth	Rita St. Swithens	Voice; Episode: "Vagina Shame"
2023–24	Grey's Anatomy	Maxine Anderson	6 episodes
2023	Human Resources	Rita St. Swithens (voice)	Episode: "On the Daughterfront"
2024	Ark: The Animated Series	Chava (voice)	
2025	Loot	Lady Olivia Tottenham	Episode: "Lady Molly"

==== TV films, miniseries, and specials ====
Year	Title	Role	Notes
1960	Mrs. Miniver	Carol Beldon	
1967	Wings of Fire	Lisa	
1970	The Challengers	Mary McCabe	
1973	Letters from Three Lovers	Maggie	
1974	QB VII	Samantha Cady	
1974	Rex Harrison Presents Stories of Love	Usherette	Failed pilot
1976	Once an Eagle	Joyce	
1977	Alexander: The Other Side of Dawn	Myra	
1977	Barnaby and Me	Jennifer	
1979	The Cracker Factory	Tinkerbell	
1989	Judith Krantz's Till We Meet Again	Vivianne de Biron	
1993	A Stranger in the Mirror	Alice Tanner	
2008–09	Four Seasons	Lady Florence Combe	
2022	English Estate	Mary	

=== Audio ===
Year	Title	Role	Notes
1987	Valley of the Dolls	Narrator	Audiobook recording by Phoenix Books

== Awards and nominations ==
Institution	Year	Category	Work	Result	Ref.
Bravo Otto	1972	Best Female TV Star	Nanny and the Professor	Nominated	
Tony Awards	1958	Best Featured Actress in a Play	Five Finger Exercise	Nominated	
Golden Globe Awards	1971	Best Actress – Television Series Musical or Comedy	Nanny and the Professor	Nominated	
Golden Globe Awards	1973	Best Motion Picture Actress – Musical/Comedy	Avanti!	Nominated	
Primetime Emmy Awards	1975	Outstanding Single Performance by a Supporting Actress in a Comedy or Drama Special	QB VII	Won	
Soap Opera Digest Awards	2000	Outstanding Villain	Passions	Nominated	
Soap Opera Digest Awards	2001	Outstanding Villainess	Passions	Nominated	
Soap Opera Digest Awards	2003	Outstanding Supporting Actress	Passions	Nominated	
TV Land Awards	2004	Superlatively Supernatural	Nanny and the Professor	Nominated	
Daytime Emmy Awards	2005	Outstanding Lead Actress in a Drama Series	Passions	Nominated	
