= Bradford Louryk =

American stage actor (born 20th century)

Bradford Louryk (born 20th century) is an American stage actor.

He is known for his solo performance work, which often incorporates gender reversal. He is also known for his unique taste in fashion.

== Early life and education ==
Louryk was born in Scranton, Pennsylvania, and educated at Vassar College in Poughkeepsie, New York.

== Praise ==
Beginning in July 2005, Louryk garnered critical acclaim (including a half-page profile in The New York Times) for the Off-Broadway play Christine Jorgensen Reveals, a recreation of a 1958 long-form recorded interview with Christine Jorgensen (one of the first American recipients of gender reassignment surgery), in which two performers lip-synch to the actual recording. Following its New York City premiere, Christine Jorgensen Reveals played in Edinburgh, Scotland, at the Edinburgh Festival Fringe; in Boston, Massachusetts, at the Boston Center for the Arts; and in Dublin, Ireland, at The Project Arts Centre.

In 2006, Christine Jorgensen Reveals was nominated for and awarded the Drama Desk Award for Unique Theatrical Experience. The production also received a GLAAD Media Award nomination for Best Off-Broadway Play in America, in addition to awards and nominations in Dublin and Boston.

Louryk has historically received praise for his portrayals of male characters.
