= Five Finger Exercise (film) =

1962 film by Daniel Mann

- Italian film poster
- Directed by: Daniel Mann
- Written by: Frances Goodrich; Albert Hackett; Peter Shaffer (play)
- Produced by: Frederick Brisson
- Starring: Rosalind Russell; Jack Hawkins; Richard Beymer; Maximilian Schell; Annette Gorman
- Cinematography: Harry Stradling Sr.
- Edited by: William A. Lyon
- Music by: Jerome Moross
- Distributed by: Columbia Pictures
- Release date: April 19, 1962
- Running time: 109 minutes
- Country: United States
- Language: English

Five Finger Exercise [sic] is a 1962 American drama film directed by Daniel Mann and produced by Frederick Brisson from a screenplay by Frances Goodrich and Albert Hackett based on the original stage play by Peter Shaffer. The film was distributed by Columbia Pictures.

The film stars Rosalind Russell, Jack Hawkins, Richard Beymer, Maximilian Schell and Annette Gorman, with an early screen appearance by Lana Wood, the sister of Natalie Wood.

== Plot ==
Stanley and Louise Harrington are a married couple who constantly argue, and their son and daughter are on the same path. When a music teacher enters their lives, things begin to change for the better, but the peace is only temporary.

== Cast ==
- Rosalind Russell as Louise Harrington
- Jack Hawkins as Stanley Harrington
- Richard Beymer as Philip Harrington
- Annette Gorman as Pamela Harrington
- Maximilian Schell as Walter
- Lana Wood as Mary
- Terry Huntingdon as Helen
- Valora Noland - scene cut before release of film.

== Production ==
The film was based on Five Finger Exercise, a play that premiered at the Comedy Theatre in London's West End in July 1958 and played for 337 performances at the Music Box Theatre on Broadway from December 1958 until October 1960. The film project's title was temporarily changed to Five Kinds of Love before reverting to Five Finger Exercise.

Alec Guinness was originally cast in the role of Stanley Harrington but left the project because of other commitments. The producers asked Trevor Howard to take the role, but he was involved with a London stage play. The role finally went to Jack Hawkins.

Filming began on June 26, 1961 near Carmel, California. Action scenes were also filmed along the Pacific Coast in Ventura County. To film the scene in which Walter rescues Pamela from drowning, a special team of lifeguards, first-aid providers and highway patrol officers was assembled to ensure safety.

Maximilian Schell, who plays the piano in the film, was an accomplished pianist.

== Reception ==
In a contemporary review for The New York Times, critic Bosley Crowther wrote:

Something vital and essential to the dramatic quality of Peter Shaffer's successful British drama, ''Five Finger Exercise," has been lost, mislaid or stolen in the translation of it to the screen—and in the shift of its location from a British to an American middle-class milieu. What it is that is missing ... is the solid ring of truth, the artful illusion that the people in this stark family drama are real. The measure of its artificiality is in the performance that Rosalind Russell gives as a selfish and snobbish American woman who drives her husband, son and daughter to blank despair. Miss Russell is much too blithe and bouncy, too much of a bourgeois Aunty Mame, to convey a conviction of a woman who is a serious, sinister influence in her home. ... Obviously, Frances Goodrich and Albert Hackett coarsened and cheapened the original play in rewriting it into an American situation and idiom. But Delbert Mann [sic] really lost it in his fumbling direction of the cast.

Reviewer Martin Russell of the San Francisco Examiner echoed similar sentiments: "It is a fine psychological drama, or so it appeared when Peter Shaffer's play came to San Francisco last year. Now the film version has arrived ... and something has happened. ... The small additions and subtractions have made the picture barely identifiable with the original. ... [T]he movie characters seem to have diminished in depth and stature. You hardly care what happens to them. ... Daniel Mann's direction suggests that he knew what he was doing—the continuity and approach to individual scenes is fine—but at the same time it shows no grasp nor particular interest in the drama's fascinating undertones."

However, critic Cyrus Durgin praised the film in his review for The Boston Globe: "'Five Finger Exercise,' on the screen as upon the stage, is theatrical enterprise of quality. It is good drama, well acted, and will appeal to those of serious tastes. ... [O]nce the drama of the family dissension begins to mount, so does the emotional temperature, and slowness and lack of visual variety do not seem to matter. ... 'Five Finger Exercise' has style and polish in its progress of a disunited family toward understanding and more love. It is accordingly recommended—to the serious-minded."

Filmink called it "a film that everyone seems to forget exists and no one saw."
