= David Doremus =

American television actor

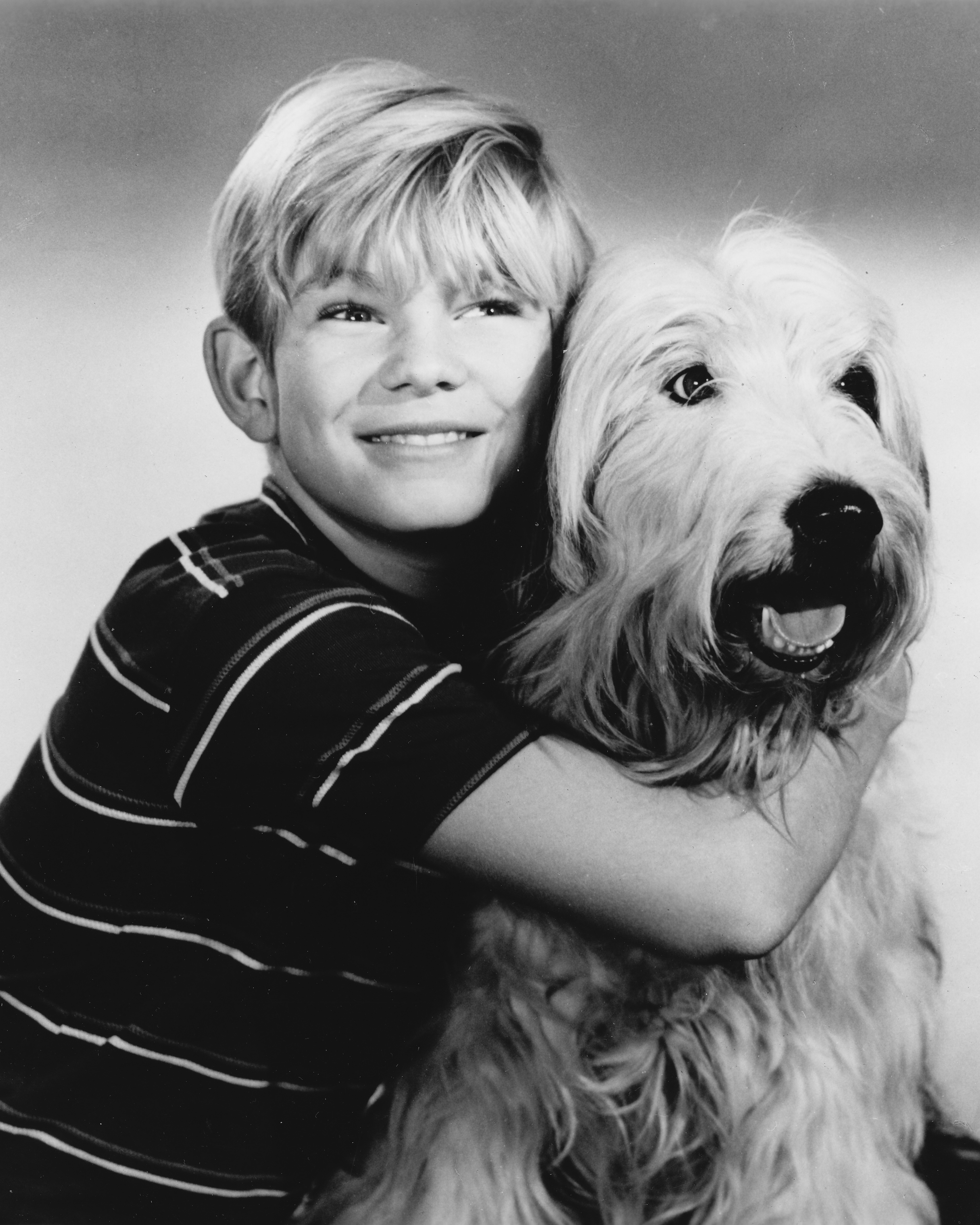
- Doremus in Nanny and the Professor, 1970
- Born: 1957 (age 68–69); Glendale, California, U.S.
- Occupation: Actor
- Years active: 1970–1981
- Children: 4

David Doremus (born 1957) is an American former television actor. He is known for playing the role of Hal Everett in the American sitcom television series Nanny and the Professor.

== Life and career ==
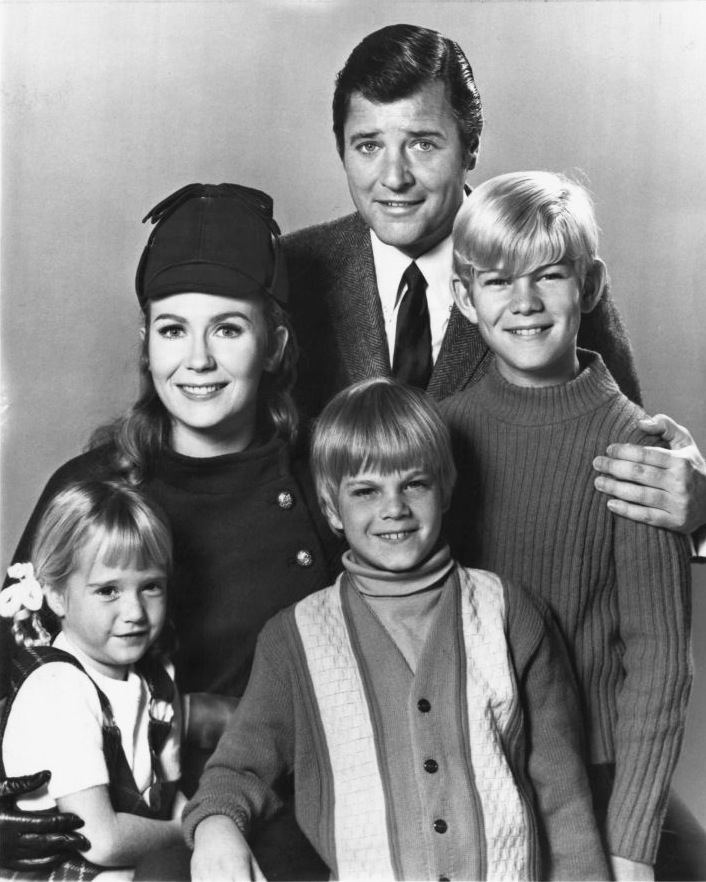
Nanny and the Professor cast 1970 (clockwise from top) Richard Long, Doremus, Trent Lehman, Kim Richards and Juliet Mills

Doremus was born in Glendale, California, the son of Colleen, a model and Robert Alan Doremus, a contractor. He had a sister, Lisa Linn. At the age of seven, Doremus appeared in commercials, while also saving money to attend the Herman Ostrow School of Dentistry of USC to pursue his ambition of becoming a dentist, an ambition he ultimately would not fulfill. He attended Lockhurst Elementary School. Doremus began his television career in 1970, first starring in the new ABC sitcom television series Nanny and the Professor playing the role of "Hal Everett", in which he co-starred with Juliet Mills, Richard Long, Trent Lehman and Kim Richards. He settled in Woodland Hills, California.

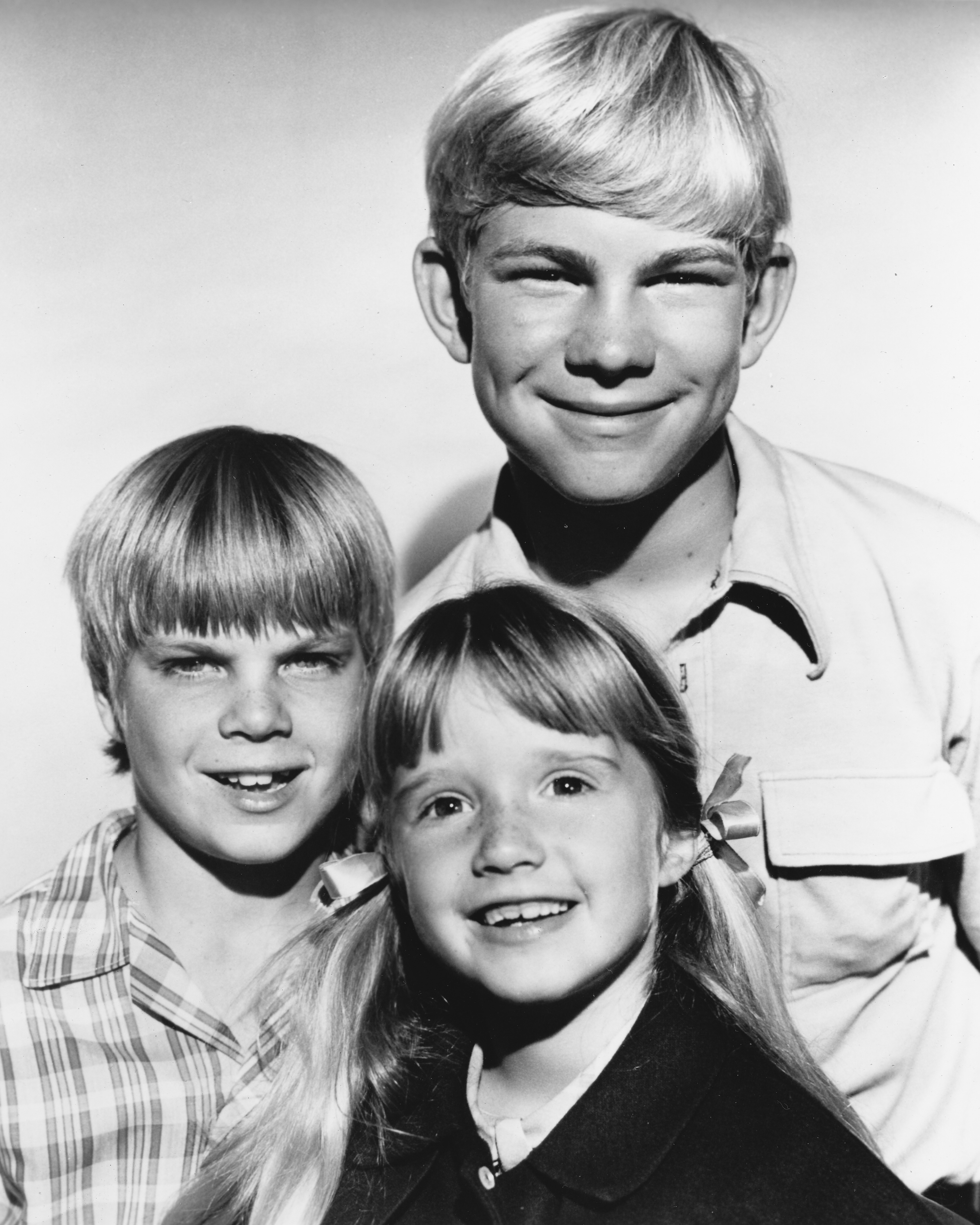
Doremus (right) with Trent Lehman and Kim Richards in Nanny and the Professor, 1971

With his role in Nanny and the Professor, Doremus achieved fame, necessitating him hiring two secretaries for his fan mail. After the series ended in 1972, he guest-starred in the western television series Bonanza, where Doremus played the role of "Gene". He then played the role of "George William 'G.W.' Haines" in the historical drama television series The Waltons, from 1972 to 1977. His last credit was in the 1981 film Rivals, where he played the role of "Chuck". After retiring from acting, Doremus served as a manager of an electronics installation company in Los Angeles.
