= The ABC Saturday Superstar Movie =

Series of American animated made-for-television films

- Also known as: The New Saturday Superstar Movie (season 2)
- Genre: Movie of the week
- Country of origin: United States
- Original language: English
- No. of seasons: 2
- No. of episodes: 20

Production
- Running time: 45–48 minutes

Original release
- Network: ABC
- Release: September 9, 1972 – November 17, 1973

The ABC Saturday Superstar Movie — retitled The New Saturday Superstar Movie for its second season — is a series of one-hour American animated made-for-television films (some of which also contained live action sequences), broadcast on the ABC television network on Saturday mornings from September 9, 1972, to November 17, 1973.

Intended as a version of the ABC Movie of the Week for kids, this series was produced by several production companies — including Hanna-Barbera, Filmation and Rankin/Bass — and mostly contained features based on popular cartoon characters and TV shows of the time, such as Yogi Bear, The Brady Bunch and Lost in Space. Some of the films served as pilots for new TV series.

The theme music and main titles were composed by Steve Zuckerman.

== List of episodes ==
=== Season 1 ===
No.	Title	Produced by:	Original release date
1	"The Brady Kids on Mysterious Island"	Filmation; Paramount Television	September 9, 1972
Based on the characters from the 1969-74 TV series The Brady Bunch, this was the pilot film for the 1972-73 animated TV series The Brady Kids. The Brady kids enter a balloon race, but they end up accidentally going to a mysterious island. They meet some strange people there, along with a talking myna bird named Marlon with magical powers and twin giant panda brothers named Ping and Pong, and even though they have a fun time with them, they have to find a way to get home.
2	"Yogi's Ark Lark"	Hanna-Barbera Productions	September 16, 1972
In this ecologically-minded film, dozens of Hanna-Barbera animal characters — led by Yogi Bear — and a park custodian named Noah Smith travel around the world, and even into outer space, in a flying version of Noah's Ark in search of "the perfect place" (i.e., a land free of pollution, deforestation and other forms of mankind's despoilment). This is the pilot film for the 1973 animated TV series Yogi's Gang.
3	"Mad, Mad, Mad Monsters"	Rankin/Bass; Mushi Production	September 23, 1972
An animated film in the same vein as the 1967 theatrical film Mad Monster Party.
4	"Nanny and the Professor"	Fred Calvert Productions; 20th Century-Fox Television	September 30, 1972
First of two animated films in which the cast of the 1970-71 TV series Nanny and the Professor get caught up in a mystery involving a microdot.
5	"Popeye Meets the Man Who Hated Laughter"	Hal Seeger Productions; King Features Syndicate	October 7, 1972
This film unites a wide range of newspaper comic strip characters — including Popeye, Blondie, Hi and Lois, Snuffy Smith, Beetle Bailey, Jiggs and Maggie, Steve Canyon, The Phantom, Flash Gordon, Mandrake the Magician, The Little King, and The Katzenjammer Kids — against a common enemy.
6	"Willie Mays and the Say-Hey Kid"	Rankin/Bass; Topcraft	October 14, 1972
This animated film stars the famous San Francisco Giants baseball player Willie Mays, who voices his own character. A guardian angel named Casey (named after legendary baseball manager Casey Stengel and voiced by Paul Frees) agrees to help Willie win the National League pennant if he agrees to be the godfather of an orphaned girl named Veronica.
7–8	"Oliver and the Artful Dodger"	Hanna-Barbera Productions	October 21, 1972 (pt. 1); October 28, 1972 (pt. 2)
An animated sequel to the 1838 Charles Dickens novel Oliver Twist. Oliver is adopted by Mr. Brownlow. When Mr. Brownlow dies, his will cannot be found, so his nephew Sniperly tries to just take the money. Oliver has to stop him. Meanwhile, the Artful Dodger now helps children escape from workhouses.
9	"The Adventures of Robin Hoodnik"	Hanna-Barbera Productions	November 4, 1972
A retelling of the legend of Robin Hood, with a cast of all-anthropomorphic animal characters. Broadcast one year before the release of Disney's 1973 animated film Robin Hood.
10	"Lassie and the Spirit of Thunder Mountain"	Filmation	November 11, 1972
Based on the tremendously popular Lassie character, this was the pilot film for the 1972-73 animated TV series Lassie's Rescue Rangers. Someone is trying to frighten away the Native American people of Thunder Mountain and Lassie has to get to the bottom of it.
11	"Gidget Makes the Wrong Connection (a.k.a. The Odd Squad)"	Hanna-Barbera Productions; Screen Gems	November 18, 1972
Animated film in which the characters from the 1965-66 TV series Gidget run afoul of seagoing gold smugglers.
12	"The Banana Splits in Hocus Pocus Park"	Hanna-Barbera Productions	November 25, 1972
An animated/live-action film starring The Banana Splits. The Splits give Susie, a little girl, a tour of an amusement park. They follow a balloon that goes into a billboard and they chase after it. In it is a witch that kidnaps Susie and the Splits have to save her.
13	"Tabitha and Adam and the Clown Family"	Hanna-Barbera Productions; Screen Gems	December 2, 1972
Animated film in which the teenage Tabitha and Adam Stephens, the children from the 1964-72 TV series Bewitched, use their magical powers to save a circus, and which was a failed pilot for an animated series.
14	"The Red Baron"	Rankin/Bass; Topcraft	December 9, 1972
This animated film casts the Red Baron as a hero in a world of heroic anthropomorphic dogs and villainous anthropomorphic cats.
15	"Daffy Duck and Porky Pig Meet the Groovie Goolies"	Filmation; Warner Bros. Television	December 16, 1972
In this unusual cartoon crossover film, for which Filmation obtained the rights to use many of Warner Bros.' Looney Tunes characters, the Groovie Goolies help Daffy, Porky and the other Looney Tunes to solve a spooky mystery (in the style of Scooby-Doo Where Are You!). Mostly animated, but includes a live-action segment, which can be seen here.
16	"Luvcast U.S.A."	DePatie–Freleng Enterprises	January 6, 1973
A mini-anthology film loosely based on the 1969-74 TV series Love, American Style.
17	"That Girl in Wonderland"	Rankin/Bass; Topcraft	January 13, 1973
In this animated film, the main character from the 1966-71 TV series That Girl imagines herself in the stories Alice in Wonderland, Goldilocks and the Three Bears, The Wizard of Oz and Cinderella.

=== Season 2 ===
For the second season, the series was retitled The New Saturday Superstar Movie.

No.	Title	Produced by:	Original release date
18	"Lost in Space"	Hanna-Barbera Productions; 20th Century-Fox Television	September 8, 1973
Based on the 1965-68 TV series Lost in Space, this was the pilot film for an animated version of the series with mostly different characters, but the series was never made.
19	"The Mini-Munsters"	Fred Calvert Productions; Universal Television	October 27, 1973
Animated film based on the 1964-66 TV series The Munsters involving a car that is "fueled" by music.
20	"Nanny and the Professor and the Phantom of the Circus"	Fred Calvert Productions; 20th Century-Fox Television	November 17, 1973
Second (and final) of two animated films in which the cast of Nanny and the Professor get involved in a mystery about a traveling circus.

== Home video ==
Five of the above films have been released on VHS videocassette:

- "Mad, Mad, Mad Monsters"
- "Willie Mays and the Say-Hey Kid"
- "Oliver and the Artful Dodger"
- "The Banana Splits in Hocus Pocus Park"
- "Lassie and the Spirit of Thunder Mountain", along with the Lassie's Rescue Rangers episode "Lost".

"Mad, Mad, Mad Monsters", "Yogi's Ark Lark" and "The Brady Kids on Mysterious Island" have been released on DVD, the latter two on the complete series releases for Yogi's Gang and The Brady Kids, respectively.

"The Adventures of Robin Hoodnik" and "Oliver and the Artful Dodger" have been released on DVD as part of a two-disc set titled Hanna-Barbera Specials Collection.

"Lost In Space" was included on the Lost In Space complete series Blu-ray set.
