= List of songs recorded by the Carpenters =

Songs by American duo

This is a comprehensive list of songs written or performed by pop duo the Carpenters, featuring Karen and Richard Carpenter. This list includes official studio albums, live albums, solo albums, and notable compilations that feature rare or unreleased material.

== Song list ==
| Title | Release | Year released | Year Recorded | Composer(s) | Notes |
|---|---|---|---|---|---|
| (A Place To) Hideaway | Carpenters | 1971 | 1971 | Sparks | |
| (I'm Caught Between) Goodbye and I Love You | Horizon | 1975 | 1974 | Bettis, Carpenter | |
| (They Long to Be) Close to You | Close to You | 1970 | 1970 | Bacharach, David | |
| (Want You) Back in My Life Again | Made in America | 1981 | 1980 | Chater, Christian | |
| A Song for You | A Song for You | 1972 | 1972 | Leon Russell | Not released as a single |
| All Because of You | Karen Carpenter | 1996 | 1979 | Javors | Karen Carpenter solo |
| All I Can Do | Offering/Ticket to Ride | 1969 | 1968 | Bettis, Carpenter | |
| All of My Life | Offering/Ticket to Ride | 1969 | 1969 | Carpenter | |
| All Those Years Ago | Pianist, Arranger, Composer, Conductor | 1998 | 1997 | Carpenter, Oland | Richard Carpenter solo |
| Medley | Pianist, Arranger, Composer, Conductor | 1998 | 1997 | Raposo, Bettis, Nichols, Williams, Bramlett, Russell, Carpenter | Richard Carpenter solo |
| Prelude | Pianist, Arranger, Composer, Conductor | 1998 | 1997 | Carpenter | Richard Carpenter solo |
| All You Get from Love Is a Love Song | Passage | 1977 | 1977 | Eaton | |
| Here Comes Santa Claus Medley | An Old-Fashioned Christmas | 1984 | 1984 | Autry, Melka, Haldema, Nelson, Rollins, Rollins, Marks, Neale, Carpenter | |
| (There's No Place Like) Home for the Holidays | An Old-Fashioned Christmas | 1984 | 1978 | Stillman, Allen | Christmas Portrait 1978 TV Special |
| An Old-Fashioned Christmas | An Old-Fashioned Christmas | 1984 | 1984 | Bettis, Carpenter | |
| Another Song | Close to You | 1970 | 1969 | Bettis, Carpenter | |
| At the End of a Song | Voice of the Heart | 1983 | 1980 | Bettis, Carpenter | |
| Aurora | Horizon | 1975 | 1975 | Bettis, Carpenter | |
| Ave Maria | Christmas Portrait | 1978 | 1978 | Bach, Gounod | Christmas Portrait 1978 TV Special |
| Baby It's You | Close to You | 1970 | 1970 | Bacharach, David, Williams | |
| Because We Are in Love (The Wedding Song) | Made in America | 1981 | 1980 | Bettis, Carpenter | |
| Beechwood 4-5789 | Made in America | 1981 | 1980 | Gaye, Gordy, Stevenson | |
| Benediction | Offering/Ticket to Ride | 1969 | 1969 | Bettis, Carpenter | |
| Bless the Beasts and Children | A Song for You | 1971 | 1971 | Botkin, De Vorzon | |
| Boat to Sail | A Kind of Hush | 1976 | 1976 | DeShannon | |
| Breaking Up Is Hard to Do | A Kind of Hush | 1976 | 1975 | Greenfield, Sedaka | |
| B'wana She No Home | Passage | 1977 | 1977 | Franks | |
| California Dreamin' | As Time Goes By | 2001 | 1967 | Phillips, Phillips | Demo |
| Calling Occupants of Interplanetary Craft (The Recognized Anthem of World Contact Day) | Passage | 1977 | 1977 | Draper, Woloschuk | |
| Calling Your Name Again | Time | 1987 | 1987 | Carpenter, Marx | Richard Carpenter solo |
| Morinaga Hi-Crown Chocolate Commercial | From the Top | 1991 | 1974 | Carpenter | |
| Your Navy Presents | From the Top | 1991 | 1970 | Carpenter | |
| Can't Smile Without You | A Kind of Hush | 1976 | 1976 | Arnold, Martin, Morrow | |
| Suntory Pop Jingle | From the Top | 1991 | 1977 | Suzuki, Umegaki, Narahashi | |
| Caravan | From the Top | 1991 | 1965 | Ellington, Mills, Tizol | |
| Radio Contest Outtakes | From the Top | 1991 | 1973 | Carpenter | |
| 1980 Medley | From the Top | 1991 | 1980 | Raposo, Bacharach, David, Bettis, Williams, Nichols, Carpenter | Music, Music, Music 1980 TV Special |
| Carol of the Bells | Christmas Portrait | 1978 | 1978 | Leontovych, Wilhousky | |
| Christ Is Born | Christmas Portrait | 1978 | 1977 | Bartolucci, Charles | Carpenters At Christmas 1977 TV Special |
| Crescent Noon | Close to You | 1970 | 1970 | Bettis, Carpenter | |
| Crystal Lullaby | A Song for You | 1972 | 1972 | Bettis, Carpenter | |
| Da Doo Ron Ron (When He Walked Me Home) | Now & Then | 1973 | 1973 | Barry, Greenwich, Spector | |
| Dead Man's Curve | Now & Then | 1973 | 1973 | Berry, Christian, Kornfeld, Wilson | |
| Desperado | Horizon | 1975 | 1975 | Frey, Henley | |
| Do You Hear What I Hear? | An Old-Fashioned Christmas | 1984 | 1978 | Regney, Baker | Christmas Portrait 1978 TV Special |
| Don't Be Afraid | Offering/Ticket to Ride | 1969 | 1969 | Carpenter | |
| Don't Cry for Me Argentina | Passage | 1977 | 1977 | Lloyd Webber, Rice | |
| Druscilla Penny | Carpenters | 1971 | 1971 | Bettis, Carpenter | |
| Eve | Offering/Ticket to Ride | 1969 | 1969 | Bettis, Carpenter | |
| Eventide | Horizon | 1975 | 1975 | Bettis, Carpenter | |
| Flat Baroque | A Song for You | 1972 | 1972 | Bettis, Carpenter | |
| For All We Know | Carpenters | 1971 | 1970 | James, Karlin, Wilson | |
| For All We Know (Reprise) | Carpenters | 1971 | 1970 | James, Karlin, Wilson | |
| Fun, Fun, Fun | Now & Then | 1973 | 1973 | Love, Wilson | |
| Get Together | Offering/Ticket to Ride | 1969 | 1969 | Powers | |
| Good Friends Are for Keeps | From the Top | 1991 | 1975 | Silberman | |
| Good Night | From the Top | 1991 | 1967 | Lennon, McCartney | |
| Goodbye to Love | A Song for You | 1972 | 1972 | Bettis, Carpenter | |
| Goofus | A Kind of Hush | 1976 | 1975 | Harold, Kahn, King | |
| Guess I Just Lost My Head | Karen Carpenter | 1996 | 1979 | Mounsey | Karen Carpenter solo |
| Happy | Horizon | 1975 | 1974 | Bettis, Peluso, Rubin | |
| Have Yourself a Merry Little Christmas | Christmas Portrait | 1978 | 1977 | Blane, Martin | |
| He Came Here for Me | An Old-Fashioned Christmas | 1984 | 1978 | Nelson | Christmas Portrait 1978 TV Special |
| Heather | Now & Then | 1973 | 1973 | Pearson | |
| Help! | Close to You | 1970 | 1970 | Lennon, McCartney | |
| Honolulu City Lights | Lovelines | 1989 | 1978 | Beamer | |
| Hurting Each Other | A Song for You | 1972 | 1971 | Geld, Udell | |
| I Believe You | Made in America | 1978 | 1978 | Addrisi, Addrisi | |
| I Can Dream, Can't I? | Horizon | 1975 | 1975 | Fain, Kahal | |
| I Can't Make Music | Now & Then | 1973 | 1973 | Edelman | |
| I Have You | A Kind of Hush | 1976 | 1976 | Bettis, Carpenter | |
| I Heard the Bells on Christmas Day | An Old-Fashioned Christmas | 1984 | 1978 | Longfellow, Marks | Christmas Portrait 1978 TV Special |
| I Just Fall in Love Again | Passage | 1977 | 1977 | Dorff, Herbstritt, Lloyd, Sklerov | |
| I Kept on Loving You | Close to You | 1970 | 1970 | Nichols, Williams | |
| I Need to Be in Love | A Kind of Hush | 1976 | 1976 | Bettis, Carpenter, Hammond | |
| I Won't Last a Day Without You | A Song for You | 1972 | 1971 | Nichols, Williams | |
| I'll Be Home for Christmas | Christmas Portrait | 1978 | 1977 | Gannon, Ram, Kent | |
| Iced Tea | From the Top | 1991 | 1966 | Carpenter | |
| If I Had You | Lovelines | 1989 | 1980 | Dorff, Harju, Herbstritt | |
| If We Try | Lovelines | 1989 | 1980 | Temperton | |
| I'll Be Yours | From the Top | 1966 | 1966 | Carpenter | Karen Carpenters solo 1966 single B-Side |
| I'll Never Fall in Love Again | Close to You | 1970 | 1969 | Bacharach, David | |
| I'm Still Not Over You | Time | 1987 | 1986 | Bettis, Carpenter | Richard Carpenter solo |
| In Love Alone | Time | 1987 | 1986 | Bettis, Carpenter | Richard Carpenter solo |
| Intermission | A Song for You | 1972 | 1972 | Carpenter | |
| Invocation | Offering/Ticket to Ride | 1969 | 1968 | Bettis, Carpenter | |
| It Came Upon a Midnight Clear | An Old-Fashioned Christmas | 1984 | 1984 | Sears, Willis, Sullivan | |
| It's Christmas Time/Sleep Well Little Children | Christmas Portrait | 1978 | 1977 | Stillman, Young, Bergman, Klatzkin | Carpenters At Christmas 1977 TV Special |
| It's Going to Take Some Time | A Song for You | 1972 | 1972 | King, Stern | |
| Jambalaya (On the Bayou) | Now & Then | 1973 | 1972 | Mullican, Williams | |
| Jingle Bells | Christmas Portrait | 1978 | 1978 | Pierpont | Christmas Portrait 1978 TV Special |
| Johnny Angel | Now & Then | 1973 | 1973 | Duddy, Pockriss | |
| Karen's Theme | Pianist, Arranger, Composer, Conductor | 1998 | 1997 | Carpenter | Richard Carpenter solo |
| Kiss Me the Way You Did Last Night | Lovelines | 1989 | 1980 | Dorn, Lawley | |
| Bacharach/David Medley | Carpenters | 1971 | 1971 | Bacharach, David | |
| Last One Singin' the Blues | Karen Carpenter | 1996 | 1980 | McCann | Karen Carpenter solo |
| Leave Yesterday Behind | As Time Goes By | 2001 | 1978 | Karlin | |
| Let Me Be the One | Carpenters | 1971 | 1971 | Nichols, Williams | |
| Little Altar Boy | An Old-Fashioned Christmas | 1984 | 1978 | Smith | Christmas Portrait 1978 TV Special |
| Little Girl Blue | Lovelines | 1989 | 1978 | Hart, Rodgers | Space Encounters 1978 TV Special |
| Look to Your Dreams | Voice of the Heart | 1983 | 1977 | Bettis, Carpenter | |
| Looking for Love | From the Top | 1966 | 1966 | Carpenter | Karen Carpenters solo 1966 single |
| Love Is Surrender | Close to You | 1970 | 1970 | Carmichael | |
| Love Me for What I Am | Horizon | 1975 | 1974 | Bettis, Pascale | |
| Lovelines | Lovelines | 1989 | 1979 | Temperton | |
| Make Believe It's Your First Time | Voice of the Heart | 1983 | 1980 | Morrison, Wilson | |
| Making Love in the Afternoon | Karen Carpenter | 1996 | 1980 | Cetera | Karen Carpenter solo |
| Man Smart, Woman Smarter | Passage | 1977 | 1977 | Span | |
| Maybe It's You | Close to You | 1970 | 1970 | Bettis, Carpenter | |
| Merry Christmas, Darling | Christmas Portrait | 1970 | 1970 | Carpenter, Pooler | 1970 non album single |
| Mr. Guder | Close to You | 1970 | 1970 | Bettis, Carpenter | |
| My Body Keeps Changing My Mind | Karen Carpenter | 1996 | 1980 | Pearl | Karen Carpenter solo |
| My Favorite Things | An Old-Fashioned Christmas | 1984 | 1984 | Hammerstein, Rodgers | |
| Now | Voice of the Heart | 1983 | 1982 | Nichols, Williams | |
| Nowadays Clancy Can't Even Sing | Offering/Ticket to Ride | 1969 | 1969 | Young | |
| Nowhere Man | As Time Goes By | 2001 | 1967 | Lennon, McCartney | Demo |
| O Come, O Come, Emmanuel | Christmas Portrait | 1978 | 1978 | Traditional, Overton, Martin, Murray, Dix, Leontovych, Wilhousky, Knight, Wade, Oakeley | |
| Overture | Christmas Portrait | 1978 | 1977 | Traditional, Neale | |
| Christmas Waltz | Christmas Portrait | 1978 | 1978 | Traditional, Neale | Cahn, Styne |
| O Holy Night | An Old-Fashioned Christmas | 1984 | 1977 | Adam, Cappeau, Dwight | Carpenters At Christmas 1977 TV Special |
| On the Balcony of the Casa Rosada/Don't Cry for Me Argentina | Passage | 1977 | 1977 | Lloyd Webber, Rice | |
| One Fine Day | Now & Then | 1973 | 1973 | Goffin, King | |
| One Love | Carpenters | 1971 | 1971 | Bettis, Carpenter | |
| One More Time | A Kind of Hush | 1976 | 1976 | Anderson | |
| Only Yesterday | Horizon | 1975 | 1975 | Bettis, Carpenter | |
| Ordinary Fool | Voice of the Heart | 1983 | 1976 | Williams | |
| Our Day Will Come | Now & Then | 1973 | 1973 | Garson, Hilliard | |
| Piano Picker | A Song for You | 1972 | 1972 | Edelman | |
| Please Mr. Postman | Horizon | 1974 | 1974 | Bateman, Dobbins, Garrett, Gorman, Holland | |
| Prime Time Love | Voice of the Heart | 1983 | 1980 | Ironstone, Unobsky | |
| Rainy Days and Mondays | Carpenters | 1971 | 1971 | Nichols, Williams | |
| Reason to Believe | Close to You | 1970 | 1970 | Hardin | |
| Remember When Lovin' Took All Night | Lovelines | 1989 | 1979 | Farrar, Leiken | |
| Remind Me to Tell You | Time | 1987 | 1987 | Mueller | Richard Carpenter solo |
| Road Ode | A Song for You | 1972 | 1971 | Sims, Woodhams | |
| Sailing on the Tide | Voice of the Heart | 1983 | 1977 | Bettis, Peluso | |
| Sandy | A Kind of Hush | 1976 | 1975 | Bettis, Carpenter | |
| Santa Claus Is Coming to Town | Christmas Portrait | 1974 | 1974 | Coots, Gillespie | 1974 non album single |
| Saturday | Carpenters | 1971 | 1971 | Bettis, Carpenter | |
| Say Yeah! | Time | 1987 | 1987 | Janz, Oland | Richard Carpenter solo |
| Silent Night | Christmas Portrait | 1978 | 1978 | Gruber, Mohr, Young | Christmas Portrait 1978 TV Special |
| Sing | Now & Then | 1973 | 1973 | Raposo | |
| Sleigh Ride | Christmas Portrait | 1978 | 1977 | Anderson, Parish | Carpenters At Christmas 1977 TV Special |
| Slow Dance | Lovelines | 1989 | 1978 | Margo, Margo | |
| Solitaire | Horizon | 1975 | 1975 | Cody, Sedaka | |
| Somebody's Been Lyin' | Made in America | 1981 | 1980 | Bacharach, Sager | |
| Someday | Offering/Ticket to Ride | 1969 | 1969 | Bettis, Carpenter | |
| Something in Your Eyes | Time | 1987 | 1986 | Carpenter, Oland | Richard Carpenter solo |
| Sometimes | Carpenters | 1971 | 1971 | Mancini, Mancini | |
| A Song for You | A Song for You | 1972 | 1972 | Russell | |
| A Song for You (Reprise) | A Song for You | 1972 | 1972 | Russell | |
| Still Crazy After All These Years | Karen Carpenter | 1996 | 1979 | Simon | Karen Carpenter solo |
| Still in Love with You | Karen Carpenter | 1996 | 1979 | Javors | Karen Carpenter solo |
| Strength of a Woman | Made in America | 1981 | 1980 | Brown, Curiel | |
| Superstar | Carpenters | 1971 | 1971 | Bramlett, Russell | |
| Sweet, Sweet Smile | Passage | 1977 | 1977 | Newton, Young | |
| That's What I Believe | Time | 1987 | 1987 | Carpenter, Oland | Richard Carpenter solo |
| The Christmas Song (Chestnuts Roasting on an Open Fire) | Christmas Portrait | 1978 | 1977 | Torme, Wells | Carpenters At Christmas 1977 TV Special |
| The End of the World | Now & Then | 1973 | 1973 | Dee, Kent | |
| The First Snowfall/Let It Snow! Let It Snow! Let It Snow! | Christmas Portrait | 1978 | 1977 | Burke, Webster, Cahn, Styne | |
| The Night Has a Thousand Eyes | Now & Then | 1973 | 1973 | Garrett, Wayne, Weisman | |
| The Parting of Our Ways | From the Top | 1991 | 1966 | Carpenter | |
| The Rainbow Connection | As Time Goes By | 2001 | 1980 | Ascher, Williams | |
| The Uninvited Guest | Lovelines | 1989 | 1980 | Kaye, Tweel | |
| There's a Kind of Hush | A Kind of Hush | 1976 | 1976 | Reed, Stephens | |
| This Masquerade | Now & Then | 1973 | 1973 | Russell | |
| Those Good Old Dreams | Made in America | 1981 | 1980 | Bettis, Carpenter | |
| Ticket to Ride | Offering/Ticket to Ride | 1969 | 1969 | Lennon, McCartney | |
| Time | Time | 1987 | 1986 | Carpenter | Richard Carpenter solo |
| Top of the World | A Song for You | 1972 | 1972 | Bettis, Carpenter | |
| Touch Me When We're Dancing | Made in America | 1981 | 1980 | Bell, Skinner, Wallace | |
| Tryin' to Get the Feeling Again | From the Top | 1991 | 1975 | Pomeranz | |
| Without a Song | As Time Goes By | 2001 | 1980 | Youmans | Music, Music, Music 1980 TV Special |
| I Got Rhythm Medley | As Time Goes By | 2001 | 1980 | Gershwin, Gershwin | Music, Music, Music 1980 TV Special |
| Dancing in the Street | As Time Goes By | 2001 | 1978 | Hunter, Gaye, Stevenson | Space Encounters 1978 TV Special |
| Dizzy Fingers | As Time Goes By | 2001 | 1980 | Confrey | Music, Music, Music 1980 TV Special |
| You're Just in Love | As Time Goes By | 2001 | 1980 | Berlin | Music, Music, Music 1980 TV Special |
| Karen/Ella Medley | As Time Goes By | 2001 | 1980 | Russell, Rodgers, Hart, Fain, Kahal, Gershwin, Hupfeld, Ellington, Mills | Music, Music, Music 1980 TV Special |
| Close Encounters/Star Wars Medley | As Time Goes By | 2001 | 1978 | Williams | Space Encounters 1978 TV Special |
| Carpenters/Como Medley | As Time Goes By | 2001 | 1974 | Bettis, Bacharach, David, Raposo, Pockriss, Vance, Manzanero, Wayne, Williams, Nichols, McLean, Willet, Mossman, Rodgers, Hammerstein II, Carpenter | 1974 Christmas TV Special |
| Hits Medley '76 | As Time Goes By | 2001 | 1976 | Raposo, Bacharach, David, Karlin, Griffin, Wilson, Lennon–McCartney, Bettis, Williams, Nichols, Carpenter | Carpenters First TV Special |
| Superstar/Rainy Days and Mondays Medley | As Time Goes By | 2001 | 1976 | Bramlett, Russell, Williams, Nichols | Carpenters First TV Special |
| And When He Smiles | As Time Goes By | 2001 | 1971 | Anderson | BBC In Concert TV Special |
| From This Moment On | From the Top | 1991 | 1980 | Peter | Music, Music, Music 1980 TV Special |
| Turn Away | Offering/Ticket to Ride | 1969 | 1969 | Bettis, Carpenter | |
| Two Lives | Voice of the Heart | 1983 | 1980 | Jordan | |
| Two Sides | Passage | 1977 | 1977 | Davis | |
| We've Only Just Begun | Close to You | 1970 | 1970 | Nichols, Williams | |
| What Are You Doing New Year's Eve? | An Old-Fashioned Christmas | 1984 | 1978 | Loesser | Christmas Portrait 1978 TV Special |
| Selections from The Nutcracker | An Old-Fashioned Christmas | 1984 | 1978 | Tchaikovsky, Carpenter | Christmas Portrait 1978 TV Special |
| What's the Use | Offering/Ticket to Ride | 1969 | 1969 | Bettis, Carpenter | |
| When I Fall in Love | Lovelines | 1989 | 1980 | Heyman, Young | Music, Music, Music 1980 TV Special |
| When It's Gone (It's Just Gone) | Made in America | 1981 | 1980 | Handley | |
| When Time Was All We Had | Time | 1987 | 1986 | Carpenter, Oland | Richard Carpenter solo |
| When You've Got What It Takes | Made in America | 1981 | 1980 | Lane, Nichols | |
| Where Do I Go from Here | Lovelines | 1989 | 1978 | McGee | |
| Who Do You Love? | Time | 1987 | 1986 | Holden, Hamilton, Pickus | Richard Carpenter solo |
| Winter Wonderland/Silver Bells/White Christmas | Christmas Portrait | 1978 | 1977 | Bernard, Smith, Livingston, Evans, Berlin | Carpenters At Christmas 1977 TV Special |
| Yesterday Once More | Now & Then | 1973 | 1973 | Bettis, Carpenter | |
| Yesterday Once More (Reprise) | Now & Then | 1973 | 1973 | Bettis, Carpenter | |
| You | A Kind of Hush | 1976 | 1976 | Edelman | |
| You'll Love Me | From the Top | 1991 | 1967 | Carpenter | |
| Your Baby Doesn't Love You Anymore | Voice of the Heart | 1983 | 1980 | Weiss | |
| Your Wonderful Parade | Offering/Ticket to Ride | 1969 | 1968 | Bettis, Carpenter | |
| You're Enough | Voice of the Heart | 1983 | 1982 | Bettis, Carpenter | |
| You're the One | Lovelines | 1989 | 1977 | Ferguson | |
