= From the Top (album) =

Box set by the Carpenters
- Released: October 8, 1991
- Genre: Pop
- Length: 203:18
- Label: A&M
- Producer: Richard Carpenter

The Carpenters chronology
Lovelines (1989)	From the Top (1991)	Interpretations (1995)

Professional ratings
Review scores
Source	Rating
AllMusic	4.5/5 stars
Entertainment Weekly	B−
MusicHound Lounge	3/5 stars
The Rolling Stone Album Guide	2.5/5 stars

From the Top is a box set by the Carpenters, released in 1991.

== Overview ==
The box set spans the duo's career from the early Richard Carpenter Trio recordings from 1965 to the final recordings in 1982 and claims to have 20 previously unreleased tracks and 40 remixes.

Previously unreleased tracks include two songs from then unreleased Karen Carpenter's solo album, "My Body Keeps Changing My Mind" and "Still Crazy After All These Years".

The songs in the box set are attributed to their original recording time or single release despite some of them being re-recordings ("Ticket to Ride") or later album releases ("Ordinary Fool", "If I Had You", "Now").

From the Top was revised with similar box set The Essential Collection: 1965–1997 in 2002.

== Track listings ==
=== Disc one ===
1965–1970

1. "Caravan" (1965) (Juan Tizol, Irving Mills) – 3:38
2. "The Parting of Our Ways" (1966) (Richard Carpenter) – 2:20
3. "Looking for Love" (1966) (Carpenter) – 1:52
4. "I'll Be Yours" (1966) (Carpenter) – 2:28
5. "Iced Tea" (1966) (Carpenter) – 2:36
6. "You'll Love Me" (1967) (Carpenter) – 2:27
7. "All I Can Do" (1967) (Carpenter, John Bettis) – 1:50
8. "Don't Be Afraid" (1968; demo) (Carpenter) – 2:07
9. "Invocation" (1968; demo) (Carpenter, Bettis) – 1:01
10. "Your Wonderful Parade" (1968; demo) (Carpenter, Bettis) – 2:23
11. "Good Night" (1969) (John Lennon, Paul McCartney) – 2:34
12. "All of My Life" (1969; 1987 remix) (Carpenter) – 3:02
13. "Eve" (1969; 1987 remix) (Carpenter, Bettis) – 2:52
14. "Ticket to Ride" (1969; 1973 remix) (Lennon, McCartney) – 4:11
15. "Get Together" (1970) (Chet Powers) – 2:40
16. Interview (1970) – 1:35
17. "Maybe It's You" (1970; 1990 remix) (Carpenter, Bettis) – 3:09
18. "(They Long to Be) Close to You" (1970; single) (Burt Bacharach, Hal David) – 3:42
19. "We've Only Just Begun" (1970; 1985 remix) (Paul Williams, Roger Nichols) – 3:05
20. "Merry Christmas Darling" (1970; single) (Frank Pooler, Carpenter) – 3:05
21. "For All We Know" (1970; 1990 remix) (Fred Karlin, Arthur James, Robb Wilson) – 2:32

=== Disc two ===
1971–1973

1. "Superstar" (1971; 1990 remix) (Leon Russell, Bonnie Bramlett) – 3:45
2. "Rainy Days and Mondays" (1971; 1985 remix) (Williams, Nichols) – 3:36
3. "Let Me Be the One" (1971; 1990 remix) (Williams, Nichols) – 2:50
4. "Bless the Beasts and Children" (1971; 1985 remix) (Barry DeVorzon, Perry Botkin Jr.) – 3:15
5. "Hurting Each Other" (1972; 1990 remix) (Gary Geld, Peter Udell) – 2:46
6. "Top of the World" (1972) (Carpenter, Bettis) – 2:59
7. "Goodbye to Love" (1972; 1985 remix) (Carpenter, Bettis) – 4:00
8. "Santa Claus Is Comin' to Town" (1972 single; 1984 remix) (J. Fred Coots, Haven Gillespie) – 4:08
9. "This Masquerade" (1973; 1990 remix) (Russell) – 4:53
10. "Canta" (Spanish lyric of "Sing") (1973) (Joe Raposo) – 3:20
11. "Yesterday Once More" (1973; 1985 remix) (Carpenter, Bettis) – 3:50
12. "Fun, Fun, Fun" (1973; 1990 remix) (Brian Wilson, Mike Love) – 1:40
13. "The End of the World" (1973; 1990 remix) (Arthur Kent, Sylvia Dee) – 2:26
14. "Da Doo Ron Ron" (1973; 1990 remix) (Jeff Barry, Ellie Greenwich, Phil Spector) – 1:46
15. "Dead Man's Curve" (1973; 1990 remix) (Jan Berry, Roger Christian, Wilson, Artie Kornfeld) – 1:32
16. "Johnny Angel" (1973; 1990 remix) (Lyn Duddy, Lee Pockriss) – 1:31
17. "The Night Has a Thousand Eyes" (1973; 1990 remix) (Ben Weisman, Dottie Wayne, Marilyn Garrett) – 2:22
18. "Our Day Will Come" (1973; 1990 remix) (Bob Hilliard, Mort Garson) – 2:00
19. "One Fine Day" (1973; 1990 remix) (Carole King, Gerry Goffin) – 1:33
20. "Yesterday Once More (reprise)" (1973) (Carpenter, Bettis) – 1:02
21. Radio Contest Outtakes (1973) – 1:53

=== Disc three ===
1974–1978

1. "Please Mr. Postman" (1974) (Georgia Dobbins, William Garrett, Freddie Gorman, Brian Holland, Robert Bateman) – 2:52
2. "Only Yesterday" (1975; 1984 remix) (Carpenter, Bettis) – 3:59
3. "Solitaire" (1975) (Neil Sedaka, Phil Cody) – 4:40
4. "Good Friends Are for Keeps" (1975) (Jon Silberman) – 1:09
5. "Ordinary Fool" (1976; 1983 remix) (Williams) – 3:43
6. "I Need to Be in Love" (1976; 1990 remix) (Carpenter, Bettis, Albert Hammond) – 3:48
7. "From This Moment On" (1976; live) (Cole Porter) – 2:13
8. Suntory Pop Jingle #1 (1977) (Hiromasa Suzuki, Yoko Narahashi) – 0:33
9. Suntory Pop Jingle #2 (1977) (Tatsushi Umegaki, Yoko Narahashi) – 0:34
10. "All You Get from Love Is a Love Song" (1977) (Steve Eaton) – 3:46
11. "Calling Occupants of Interplanetary Craft" (1977; 1989 remix) (Terry Draper, John Woloschuk) – 7:10
12. "Christ Is Born" (1978; 1990 remix) (Domenico Bartolucci, Ray Charles) – 3:12
13. "White Christmas" (1978; 1990 remix) (Irving Berlin) – 2:29
14. "Little Altar Boy" (1978; 1984 remix) (Howlett Smith) – 3:44
15. "Ave Maria" (1978; 1990 remix) (Johann Sebastian Bach, Charles Gounod) – 2:37

=== Disc four ===
1978–1982

1. "Where Do I Go from Here?" (1978) (Parker McGee) – 4:26
2. "Little Girl Blue" (1978) (Richard Rodgers, Lorenz Hart) – 3:24
3. "If I Had You" (1979; 1989 remix) (Steve Dorff, Gary Harju, Larry Herbstritt) – 3:57
4. "My Body Keeps Changing My Mind" (1979; 1990 remix) (Leslie Pearl) – 3:50
5. "Still Crazy After All These Years" (1979; 1990 remix) (Paul Simon) – 4:19
6. Medley (1980) – 9:08
  - "Sing" (Raposo)
  - "Knowing When to Leave" (Bacharach, David)
  - "Make It Easy on Yourself" (Bacharach, David)
  - "Someday" (Carpenter, Bettis)
  - "We've Only Just Begun" (Williams, Nichols)
7. "Touch Me When We're Dancing" (1980) (Terry Skinner, Kenny Bell, J.L. Wallace) – 3:22
8. "When It's Gone" (1980) (Randy Handley) – 5:01
9. "Because We Are in Love (The Wedding Song)" (1980) (Carpenter, Bettis) – 5:02
10. "Now" (1982) (Nichols, Dean Pitchford) – 3:49
