= Superstar: The Karen Carpenter Story =

1987 film by Todd Haynes

- Cover of a black-market video release of the film
- Directed by: Todd Haynes
- Written by: Todd Haynes; Cynthia Schneider
- Produced by: Todd Haynes; Cynthia Schneider
- Starring: Merrill Gruver; Michael Edwards
- Narrated by: Gwen Kraus; Bruce Tuthill
- Cinematography: Barry Ellsworth
- Edited by: Todd Haynes
- Music by: The Carpenters
- Production company: Iced Tea Productions
- Distributed by: American International Video Search, Inc.
- Release date: 1987
- Running time: 43 minutes
- Country: United States
- Language: English

Superstar: The Karen Carpenter Story is a 1987 American biographical film directed by Todd Haynes that portrays the last 17 years of singer Karen Carpenter's life as she struggled with anorexia. It features live action puppetry of Barbie-like dolls along with actors' voiceovers, plus archival and on-location footage. Superstar was co-written and co-produced by Haynes and Cynthia Schneider, with an unauthorized soundtrack consisting mostly of the hit songs of the Carpenters. It was filmed over a ten-day period at Bard College in the summer of 1985. Barry Ellsworth collaborated on the film and was the cinematographer for the Barbie-themed interior segments of the film.

The film was withdrawn from circulation in 1990 after Haynes lost a copyright infringement lawsuit filed by Karen's brother and musical collaborator, Richard Carpenter. The film's title is derived from the Carpenters' 1971 hit "Superstar". Meanwhile, over the years Superstar has developed into a cult film, has notably been bootlegged, and is included in Entertainment Weekly's 2003 list of top 50 Cult Movies. Its apparent metamodern purpose as a film, including multiple perspectives on anorexia nervosa, the pop music industry, the Carpenters themselves, and the definition of a biographical film, has also given it a legacy among fans of avant-garde cinema; Guy Lodge, writing for The Guardian, expressed that "while Haynes is working in a vein of very rich irony, there's not a hint of snark here".

== Plot ==
The film follows Karen Carpenter from the time of her "discovery" in 1966 and her quick rise to stardom to her untimely death by cardiac arrest (secondary to anorexia nervosa) in 1983. It begins in Karen's parents' home in Downey, California, on February 4, 1983, and the viewer follows through the eyes of Karen's mother, Agnes Carpenter, as she discovers her body in a closet. The film then returns by flashback to 1966, and touches on major points in Karen's life including the duo's signing with the A&M record label, their initial success and subsequent decline, Karen's development of anorexia nervosa, her 14-month marriage to Thomas Burris, Karen's on-stage collapse in Las Vegas, her search for treatment for her anorexia nervosa, the attempt to restart her career, and finally a claim that she gradually developed a reliance on syrup of ipecac (a product that, unbeknownst to her, destroyed her heart and led to her cardiac arrest and death).

An unusual facet of the film is that, instead of actors, almost all of the parts are played by modified Barbie dolls. In particular, Haynes detailed Karen's worsening anorexia by subtly whittling away at the face and arms of the "Karen" Barbie doll. Sets were created properly scaled to the dolls, including locales such as the Carpenter home in Downey, Karen's apartment in Century City, restaurants, and recording studios. Details such as labels on wine bottles and Ex-Lax boxes were shrunk in proportion. Interspersed with the story are documentary-style segments detailing both facts about anorexia and the times in which Karen Carpenter lived, as well as blurred and distorted flashing segments that are intended to break the flow of the film. These segments were seen as melodramatic parodies of the documentary genre. The underlying and unauthorized soundtrack includes many popular hits of the day, including duets such as Elton John and Kiki Dee and Captain & Tennille, and songs by Gilbert O'Sullivan, Leon Russell, as well as the bulk of The Carpenters' hits themselves. However, the soundtrack also includes distinctive experimental synthesizer pieces that serve as motifs during extremely tense moments in the plot.

The tone of the film is sympathetic to Karen, especially in regard to her anorexia, but much of that sympathy is seemingly gained by making the other characters unsympathetic. Karen's parents, Harold and Agnes, are portrayed as overly controlling, attempting to keep Karen living at home even after she turned twenty-five. Agnes was portrayed as unaware of the extent of Karen's problem with anorexia. The duo's initial meeting with A&M Records owner Herb Alpert (who is simply called Mr. A&M in the credits) was inter-cut with stock footage of Vietnam War scenes. Richard Carpenter was portrayed as a rampant perfectionist who frequently sided with his parents against Karen and was more concerned with his and Karen's careers than with Karen's health. This culminated in a scene where Richard berates a fatigued and obviously ill Karen for not meeting business demands, yelling at her, "What are you trying to do? Ruin both of our careers?", causing her to break down in tears. Haynes then insinuated, during a fight between Richard and Karen over her renewed use of Ex-Lax, that Richard had a secret that he did not want his parents to know about. Haynes' dark treatment of the film included using black captions which often blend in with the scene, rendering them unreadable.

Haynes also works spanking, a common theme in his works, into the film, through a repeated segment featuring a black-and-white overhead view of someone administering an over-the-knee spanking to the bare-bottomed adult Barbie Karen. The meaning of this segment is never discussed, leaving it to the viewer's imagination and serving as a motif breaking any intention of normality in the film.

== Cast ==
- Gwen Kraus and Bruce Tuthill as Narrators
- Merrill Gruver as Karen Carpenter
- Michael Edwards as Richard Carpenter
- Melissa Brown as Mother
- Rob LaBelle as Father / Mr. A&M
- Nannie Doyle as Cherry Boone
- Cynthia Schneider as Dionne Warwick
- Larry Kole as Announcer
- Joanne Barnett as herself
- Todd Haynes as Todd Donovan
- Michele Manenti as Michelle Hoyt
- Moira McCarty as Actress
- Richard Nixon (archive footage) as himself
- Ronald Reagan (archive footage) as himself

== Songs ==
- "Superstar" – The Carpenters (Beginning credits)
- "I'll Never Fall in Love Again" – Dionne Warwick (which Karen sings along to)
- "I'll Never Fall in Love Again" – The Carpenters
- "We've Only Just Begun" – The Carpenters
- "(They Long to Be) Close to You" – The Carpenters
- "Top of the World" – The Carpenters
- "Sing" – The Carpenters (at the White House)
- "Alone Again (Naturally)" – Gilbert O'Sullivan (while Karen is talking on the phone)
- "Let Me Be the One" – The Carpenters (played straight after "Alone Again")
- "Native New Yorker" – Odyssey (restaurant scene)
- "Love's Theme" – The Love Unlimited Orchestra
- "Theme from A Summer Place" – Percy Faith
- "Philadelphia Freedom" – Elton John (played briefly as Richard discovers Karen unconscious)
- "Rainy Days and Mondays" – The Carpenters (at the end of the song, Karen collapses)
- "Love Will Keep Us Together" – Captain & Tennille (scene when naked body parts are shown)
- "Don't Go Breaking My Heart" – Elton John with Kiki Dee (Karen's housewarming party)
- "Angel of the Morning" – Juice Newton (Karen starts dieting again)
- "This Masquerade" – The Carpenters (Karen meeting Tom Burris)
- "For All We Know" – The Carpenters (New York/Recovery montage)
- "(They Long to Be) Close to You" – The Carpenters (ending)

== Reception and copyright lawsuit ==
The film premiered in 1987. Upon its release, the film was a minor art hit, and was shown at several film festivals. However, shortly thereafter, Richard Carpenter viewed the film and became irate with its portrayal of his family and himself. It later emerged that Haynes never obtained music licensing from either Richard or the Carpenters' label, A&M Records, for the numerous songs used in the film. Richard sued Haynes for failing to obtain the clearances and won to the point of blocking Superstar's theatrical release. The Museum of Modern Art retains a copy of this film, but in an agreement with The Carpenter Estate, they do not exhibit it. Nevertheless, bootleg copies remain in circulation and it can still be seen on YouTube.

In his analysis of Superstar's bootleg existence, Lucas Hilderbrand, a professor of film studies at University of California, Irvine, stated: "Analogue reproduction of the text rather than destroying the original's aura, actually reconstructs it. Materially the fallout of the image and sound mark each successive copy as an illicit object, a forbidden pleasure watched and shared and loved to exhaustion."

In 2003, Entertainment Weekly ranked the film at No. 45 on its list of the Top 50 Cult Movies.

== See also ==
- Fan film
- The Karen Carpenter Story - 1989 television movie also about Karen's death that involved Richard's official participation
