= Where Do I Go from Here =

Where Do I Go from Here may refer to:

- "Where Do I Go from Here" (The Supremes song), a 1975 song by The Supremes
- "Where Do I Go from Here" (England Dan & John Ford Coley song), a 1977 song by England Dan & John Ford Coley; also covered by:
  - Barry Manilow on the 1978 album Even Now
  - The Carpenters on the 1989 album Lovelines
- "Where Do I Go from Here" (Paul Williams song), a 1972 song by Paul Williams on the 1973 album Life Goes On; also covered by:
  - Elvis Presley on the 1973 album Elvis
- "Where Do I Go from Here", a song by Relient K from The Nashville Tennis EP, released with The Bird and the Bee Sides
