= List of most watched United States television broadcasts of 1988 =

The following is a list of most watched United States television broadcasts of 1988 (single-network only) according to Nielsen Media Research.

== Most watched by week ==
Week of	Program	Network	Viewers (millions)	Ref.
July 25	The Deliberate Stranger (Part 2)	NBC	26.1	
July 25	The Cosby Show	NBC	26.1	
July 25	A Different World	NBC	26.1	
August 1	Cheers	NBC	23.1	
August 8	Cheers	NBC	25.2	
August 8	A Different World	NBC	25.2	
August 15	The Cosby Show	NBC	22.1	
August 22	A Different World	NBC	28.0	
August 29	A Different World	NBC	28.7	
September 5	Miss America 1989	NBC	33.1	
September 12	A Different World	NBC	26.9	
September 19	1988 Summer Olympics (Sat)	NBC	29.5	
September 26	1988 Summer Olympics (Mon)	NBC	27.1	
October 3	The Cosby Show	NBC	37.6	
October 10	The Cosby Show	NBC	36.5	
October 17	The Cosby Show	NBC	40.5	
October 24	The Cosby Show	NBC	41.1	
October 31	The Cosby Show	NBC	39.8	
November 7	The Cosby Show	NBC	49.3	
November 14	The Cosby Show	NBC	41.7	
November 21	The Golden Girls	NBC	38.2	
November 28	The Cosby Show	NBC	41.1	
December 5	The Cosby Show	NBC	38.0	
December 12	A Very Brady Christmas	CBS	41.0	
December 19	Roseanne	ABC	35.4	
December 26	The Karen Carpenter Story	CBS	40.0	
