= The Karen Carpenter Story =

1989 television film directed by Joseph Sargent

- Cynthia Gibb and Mitchell Anderson as Karen and Richard Carpenter
- Genre: Biography; Drama; Music
- Written by: Barry Morrow
- Directed by: Joseph Sargent
- Starring: Cynthia Gibb; Mitchell Anderson; Peter Michael Goetz; Louise Fletcher
- Theme music composer: Richard Carpenter
- Country of origin: United States
- Original language: English

Production
- Executive producer: Robert A. Papazian
- Producers: Hal Galli; Robert Papazian
- Production location: Los Angeles
- Cinematography: Kees Van Oostrum
- Editor: George Jay Nicholson
- Running time: 92 minutes
- Production company: Weintraub Entertainment Group

Original release
- Network: CBS
- Release: January 1, 1989

The Karen Carpenter Story is an American made-for-television biographical film about the drummer and singer Karen Carpenter and the brother-and-sister pop music duo of which she was a part, The Carpenters. The film aired on CBS on January 1, 1989. Directed by Joseph Sargent, it starred Cynthia Gibb as Karen Carpenter, and Mitchell Anderson as her brother, Richard Carpenter, who served as a producer for the film as well as of the musical score. After the movie aired, CBS featured a Read More About It segment with Richard Carpenter to recommend books associated with anorexia nervosa and bulimia.

== Story ==
The movie begins with the collapse of Karen Carpenter in the closet of her parents Harold and Agnes' home in Downey, California, on February 4, 1983. She is rushed to the hospital by paramedics, and as the EMT is placing an oxygen mask over her face, "Rainy Days and Mondays", recorded by the Carpenters on their self-titled album, is playing. The scene shifts to teenaged Karen singing "The End of the World" as she roller skates on the day the family moved into their home in Downey (they had previously resided in New Haven, Connecticut). Then the film cuts to the teenaged Karen skating in slow motion looking down on herself as the 32 year old Karen is dying at the hospital. The film then shows the highs and lows of Carpenter's life from the 1960s to 1983. One of the scenes, which showed Carpenter fainting onstage while she was singing the song "Top of the World", was fictionalized. Also fictionalized is when Richard Carpenter falls down a flight of stairs, due to his abuse of Quaaludes. The film ends with Karen smiling after Agnes says "I love you." The details about her subsequent death are superimposed on the screen before the closing credits.

== Cast ==
- Cynthia Gibb as Karen Carpenter
- Mitchell Anderson as Richard Carpenter
- Peter Michael Goetz as Harold Carpenter
- Louise Fletcher as Agnes Carpenter
- Michael McGuire as Sherwin Bash
- Lise Hilboldt as Lucy
- Kip Gilman as David Lattimer
- Scott Burkholder as Ted
- John Patrick Reger as Bob Knight
- Doug MacHugh as Dr. Lazwell
- William Tucker as Peter Howard
- Henry Crowell Jr. as Denny
- Josh Cruze as Herb Alpert
- Carrie Mitchum as Randy Bash
- Richard Minchenberg as Joe Osborn
- James Hong as Dr. Dentworth
- Stephanie Griffin as Dr. Brooks
- Hartley Silver as Band Teacher
- Robert Broyles as Bowl Emcee
- Howard Dayton as Park Emcee
- Grayce Spence as Nurse

== Production ==
The idea for a movie based on Karen Carpenter's life had been floating around after her sudden death from emetine cardiotoxicity due to anorexia nervosa in February 1983. However, it was difficult to find someone to write the script for it. Once it had been approved by the studio and Richard Carpenter, there were daily script "rewrites or entire scenes were removed" according to co-stars Cynthia Gibb and Mitchell Anderson, in an attempt to soften the image of Agnes Carpenter (Louise Fletcher) by her son in real life. The final movie, in Gibb's opinion, gives a "white-washed" account of Carpenter's life. Gibb also said that a lot of the information in it was "watered down or removed altogether" at the request of Richard Carpenter.

Richard Carpenter also requested that Gibb wear Karen Carpenter's original clothing, which he supplied, and that she lose the required weight in order to fit into these clothes. Gibb stated:

I lost weight as Richard wanted and he was there watching over me in every scene. It was unnerving having to wear Karen's clothes, right down to her clingy T-shirts and crumpled bell-bottoms. I donned a wig and used Karen's make-up. By the time I was finished I felt [like] I was Karen.

Gibb also stated that "there was no time to research and I had my drum lessons during my lunch hour". Even though she had starred for two years in Fame, she said it was still insisted upon her to take voice lessons to do the lip synching.

Crew members later talked about their experience dealing with Richard Carpenter during shooting:

Frankly, we were very glad he [Richard Carpenter] (didn't play himself). He was a pain in the backside, so oversensitive and close to the action he almost screwed things up. When we spotted him on his knees praying to Karen he was saying: 'Forgive me, forgive me...'

The misgivings he had were painfully obvious. You could almost see him wrestling with things in his mind. It was as if he felt that Karen would never have approved. He whispered to one of the boys: 'I'd give my right arm if she were here now.'

The guy just hasn't been able to let go (and now) the film lacks an independent balance.

The film featured two previously unreleased Carpenters tracks, "You're the One" and "Where Do I Go from Here?", which were later released on Lovelines later that year.

The character Bob Knight was portrayed as Carpenter's real-life husband Tom Burris; the name change was either made in error or was possibly made for legal reasons.

== Reception ==
The movie was very popular in the ratings; it was the highest-rated two-hour TV movie of the year and the third highest rated such program on any network during the 1980s. It has never had an official United States VHS or DVD release, but was issued on LaserDisc in Japan. The film was nominated for a Primetime Emmy Award for Outstanding Sound Mixing for a Limited Series or Movie at the 41st Primetime Emmy Awards.

On the review aggregator website Rotten Tomatoes, 100% of 6 critics' reviews are positive.

== Richard Carpenter's reaction ==
At the time, Richard Carpenter described his feelings towards the film:

Oh, certain things were overblown. Not that I'm trying to take anything away from the importance of the event: Karen's battle with anorexia, mine with sleeping pills but it was still a little melodramatic. Like, neither of us - for anyone that watched this movie - literally collapsed. In fact, when I saw that, I told them while it was being made: "Look, neither of us fell down here. Karen didn't onstage and I didn't go down a flight of stairs..." But we're dealing with a TV movie so you have to take it with a grain of salt. And each little thing was not exactly the way it happened, that's all. But it's still a fairly accurate log of twenty years of our lives.

In 1988, Carpenter stated, that

I was in two minds about the film from the start but I knew that if it had to be made, I had to be involved. I accept that parts of the lives of all celebrities are matters of public record but for somebody else to have done this without the family's blessing, well, it just wouldn't have been as well told.

In 2004, he was much harsher about the project, calling it "90 minutes of creative license that give biopics in general a dubious tone." He also stated at the time that he considered being involved in the film one of his biggest mistakes.
