= Honolulu City Lights =

Song composed by Hawaiian singer/songwriter Keola Beamer

Song by Keola Beamer and Kapono Beamer
- Released: 1978, re-released 1999
- Genre: Hawaiian
- Label: Paradise Productions; SLP 808
- Songwriter(s): Keola Beamer

"Honolulu City Lights" is a song composed by Hawaiian singer/songwriter Keola Beamer (b. 1951) in the 1970s. The song opens an album by the same name, Honolulu City Lights, which became the all-time bestselling Hawaiian album. It won several of the Hawaiian music industry's Na Hoku Hanohano Awards in 1979, among them that for Best Contemporary Hawaiian Album, and both song and album went on to become one of the most popular and most played works of contemporary Hawaiian music.

It has also become a Christmas music standard and is played on heritage radio station KSSK on its Christmas Music format during the Holiday season from November to December along with a handful of other Hawaiian standards and/or artists. A month long Christmas event in December that takes place in downtown Honolulu is also called Honolulu City Lights which began in 1985, but adopted the name officially in 1987.

== Carpenters' version ==
"Honolulu City Lights"
- Cover of the Carpenters' single "Honolulu City Lights"

Single by Carpenters

from the album Lovelines
- B-side: "I Just Fall in Love Again"
- Released: 1986
- Recorded: 1978
- Genre: Pop
- Label: A&M; 1940
- Songwriter(s): Keola Beamer
- Producer(s): Richard Carpenter

Carpenters singles chronology
"Little Altar Boy" (1984)	"Honolulu City Lights" (1986)	"If I Had You" (1989)

According to the official website, Richard and Karen Carpenter were vacationing in Hawaii in 1977 when they heard Keola Beamer's "Honolulu City Lights". They liked it and wanted to record it, eventually recording it at the same session as "Slow Dance" in 1978.

The recording was not commercially released until three years after Karen Carpenter's death in 1986 as a single. Three years later it was released on the Lovelines album.

== Personnel ==
- Karen Carpenter – lead vocals
- Richard Carpenter – keyboards
- Joe Osborn – bass guitar
- Ron Tutt – drums
- Tim May – acoustic guitar
- Jay Dee Maness – pedal steel guitar
- Earle Dumler – English horn
- Gayle Levant – harp
- The O.K. Singers – backing vocals
