= Karen Carpenter (album) =

Studio album by Karen Carpenter
- Released: September 11, 1996
- Recorded: May 2, 1979 – January 1980
- Studio: A&R (New York City); A&M (Hollywood, California); Kendun Recorders (Burbank, California)
- Genre: Pop, soft rock
- Label: A&M
- Producer: Phil Ramone

Singles from Karen Carpenter
- 1. "Make Believe It's Your First Time" Released: September 11, 1996

Professional ratings
Review scores
Source	Rating
AllMusic	2.5/5 stars
Entertainment Weekly	C+

Karen Carpenter is the only solo album by singer/drummer Karen Carpenter of the Carpenters, recorded between 1979 and 1980 and was first released on September 11, 1996, in Japan, followed by a US release on October 8 by A&M Records.

== Background and recording ==
The album came about when Richard Carpenter, Karen's older brother and musical partner, announced in 1979 that he wanted to take the year off while being treated for an addiction to Quaaludes putting Carpenters on a temporary hold. Karen on the other hand was eager to work and decided to pursue a solo record.

The album was recorded in New York with producer Phil Ramone in 1979 and 1980. Karen was backed by various New York and Los Angeles studio musicians, including John "JR" Robinson, Steve Gadd, Greg Phillinganes, Louis Johnson and members of Billy Joel's band.

Out of the twenty-one songs recorded, only eleven were chosen for the album. The songs on the album were mixed according to Karen Carpenter's instructions.

The production of the album cost $400,000 of Carpenter's own money and $100,000 fronted by A&M Records. The $100,000 fronted by A&M was offset against Carpenters' future album royalties.

== Cancellation ==
A&M executives in New York approved the material, but the executives in Los Angeles, including label owners Herb Alpert and Jerry Moss, responded negatively. Ramone recalls that Carpenter broke down in tears. Devastated, she accepted A&M's urging not to release the album. It was officially announced in May 1980.

Richard Carpenter later said that the decision not to release the album was Karen's, who respected the opinions of A&M executives and others—including him. Several musicians who worked on the album have said that Carpenter very much wanted her album to be released and that it was not her idea or decision to shelve it.

An episode of E! True Hollywood Story profiling Karen Carpenter claims that Herb Alpert called the album "unreleaseable". Quincy Jones championed releasing the album to Derek Green, an A&M Records vice-president, but Alpert, Moss and Green insisted the album had to be canceled.

On February 3, 1983, the day before Carpenter's death, she called Ramone to discuss the album; according to Ramone, Carpenter said, "I hope you don't mind if I curse. I still love our fucking record!"

== Posthumous release ==
The song "Make Believe It's Your First Time" was re-recorded by Carpenters during the sessions for Made in America, but it remained unreleased until the inclusion on Voice of the Heart in 1983.

Four songs from the album ("Lovelines", "If I Had You", "If We Try" and "Remember When Lovin' Took All Night") were later rearranged by Richard Carpenter and included on the Carpenters' 1989 album Lovelines. However, the "If I Had You" single released the same year was credited as Karen Carpenter's solo.

Two additional songs, "My Body Keeps Changing My Mind" and "Still Crazy After All These Years", were featured on Carpenters 1991 box set From the Top.

The album in its original intended form remained shelved until the release in 1996 — thirteen years after Karen Carpenter's death. The reason behind the release was partly due to renewed interest in Carpenters music in the mid 90s and the success of the If I Were a Carpenter tribute album. The liner notes of Karen's album included comments from Richard Carpenter and producer Phil Ramone about the later decision to release it the way Karen approved it. The resulting release included additional twelfth bonus track, "Last One Singin' the Blues".

While the album was being prepared for release, an individual at A&M copied Carpenter's unreleased and unfinished material on a cassette tape and distributed it via a fan club on Yahoo! through the mail. The songs were leaked onto the internet in 2000. Two of the unreleased songs, "I Love Makin' Love to You" and "Truly You" were finished, while the remaining tracks were work leads only and in different stages of completion.

== Track listing ==
No.	Title	Writer(s)	Length
1.	"Lovelines"	Rod Temperton	5:06
2.	"All Because of You"	Russell Javors	3:31
3.	"If I Had You"	Steve Dorff; Gary Harju; Larry Herbstritt	3:54
4.	"Making Love in the Afternoon" (with Peter Cetera)	Peter Cetera	3:57
5.	"If We Try"	Temperton	3:47
6.	"Remember When Lovin' Took All Night"	John Farrar; Molly Ann Leiken	3:50
7.	"Still in Love with You"	Javors	3:15
8.	"My Body Keeps Changing My Mind"	Leslie Pearl	3:46
9.	"Make Believe It's Your First Time"	Bob Morrison; Johnny Wilson	3:12
10.	"Guess I Just Lost My Head"	Rob Mounsey	3:36
11.	"Still Crazy After All These Years"	Paul Simon	4:17
12.	"Last One Singin' the Blues"	Peter McCann	3:24

- "Lovelines", "If I Had You", "If We Try", and "Remember When Lovin' Took All Night" also appeared on the Carpenters album Lovelines.

== Unreleased tracks ==
The following are a list of songs that Karen Carpenter recorded that never made it onto the album; however, they all circulate via bootlegging circles in various stages of completeness and in varying quality.

No.	Title	Writer(s)	Length
1.	"Love Makin' Love to You"	Evie Sands, Ben Weisman, Richard Germinaro	3:22
2.	"Don't Try to Win Me Back Again"	Carlotta McKee, Gordon Gordy	4:38
3.	"Something's Missing (In My Life)"	Jay Asher, Paul Jabara	4:43
4.	"Keep My Lovelight Burnin'"	Evie Sands, Ben Weisman	3:10
5.	"Midnight (Never Lets You Down)"	Rod Temperton	4:13
6.	"Jimmy Mack"	Eddie Holland, Lamont Dozier	3:30
7.	"I Do It for Your Love"	Paul Simon	3:37
8.	"Truly You"	Russell Javors	3:10
9.	"It's Really You"	Alan Tarney, Tom Snow, Trevor Spencer	3:21

== Personnel ==
=== Musicians ===
- Karen Carpenter – vocals
- Greg Phillinganes – keyboards, keyboard solo (1)
- Richard Tee – keyboards
- Bob James – keyboards, orchestration (1, 6, 9), arrangements (2, 3, 6, 9), keyboard solo (6)
- Rob Mounsey – keyboards, orchestration (5, 10, 11), keyboard solo (10), arrangements (10, 11)
- David Brown – guitar, guitar solo (7, 11)
- Russell Javors – guitar
- David Williams – guitar
- Eric Johns-Rasmussen – guitar
- Louis Johnson – bass
- Doug Stegmeyer – bass
- John Robinson – drums
- Steve Gadd – drums
- Liberty DeVitto – drums
- Ralph MacDonald – percussion
- Airto Moreira – percussion
- Michael Brecker – saxophone solo (3)
- Timmy Cappello – saxophone solo (4)
- Rod Temperton – arrangements (1, 5, 8), vocal arrangements (all)
- Jerry Hey – orchestration (3, 8)
- Peter Cetera – backing vocals (4), arrangements (4)

=== Production ===
- Producer – Phil Ramone
- Engineers – Glenn Berger, Ray Gerhardt and James Guthrie
- Remixing – Jim Boyer and Phil Ramone
- Recorded at A&R Studios (New York, NY); Kendun Recorders (Burbank, CA); A&M Studios (Hollywood, CA)
- Original mastering by Ted Jensen at Sterling Sound (New York, NY)
- Remastered by Dave Collins at A&M Mastering Studios (Los Angeles, CA)
- Art direction – Chuck Beeson
- Design – Chuck Beeson and Rebecca Chamlee
- Photography – Claude Mougin
- Photo colorist – Amy Nagasawa
- Liner notes – Richard Carpenter and Phil Ramone

== Charts ==
Chart performance for Karen Carpenter1996 weekly chart performance for Karen Carpenter
Chart (1996)	Peak position
Japanese Albums (Oricon)	19
