= Let Me Be the One (The Carpenters song) =

Single by the Carpenters

from the album Carpenters and From the Top
- Released: 1991 (as promo single)
- Recorded: 1971
- Genre: Pop
- Label: A&M; 1940
- Songwriters: Roger Nichols, Paul Williams
- Producer: Richard Carpenter

The Carpenters singles chronology
"If I Had You" (1989)	"Let Me Be the One" (1991)	"Tryin' to Get the Feeling Again" (1994)

"Let Me Be the One" is a song written in 1970 by Roger Nichols and Paul Williams. It was first recorded by Nanette Workman and released in 1970 as a single on Columbia Records. The Carpenters' version first appeared on their 1971 album Carpenters.

== Background ==
"Let Me Be the One" is a relatively short song, with a run time of 2:25. The earliest evident recording of "Let Me Be the One" was by Nanette Workman, being one of five songs recorded with producer Tommy Cogbill recorded in late June 1970 at American Sound Studio in Memphis, with "Let Me Be the One" being afforded a UK single release in November 1970 with the singer credited mononymously as Nanette.

Bearing something of a resemblance to "We've Only Just Begun", the song was a potential Carpenters single release in 1971, being Karen Carpenter's choice to follow "For All We Know", but Richard Carpenter doubted the hit potential of "Let Me Be the One" and the choice for single was assigned to "Rainy Days and Mondays". However the album cut "Let Me Be the One" did receive airplay on both Top 40 and MOR radio stations. Paul Williams has described "Let Me Be the One" as "one of those songs that everybody's recorded but it's never been a [major hit] single. It was used very briefly by ABC-TV in 1976 and Channel 9 Australia in 1977: Let us be the one you turn to/ Let us be the one you turn to/ When you need someone you turn to/ Let us be the one."

The 1991 remix for "Let Me Be the One" can only be found on the From the Top box set, for which it was released as a promotional single. It starts off with Karen counting off, and Richard's piano line is very different from the original 1971 mix found on the Carpenters album. In the original 1971 mix, the song fades out; the 1991 remix continues through to the point where Karen and the rest of the musicians create a conclusion.

=== Personnel ===
- Karen Carpenter – lead and backing vocals
- Richard Carpenter – backing vocals, piano, Wurlitzer electric piano, orchestration
- Joe Osborn – bass
- Hal Blaine – drums

== Other versions ==
Al Wilson recorded "Let Me Be the One" for inclusion on his 1974 album La La Peace Song, which featured the song in a medley with another Nichols/Williams composition. The track, "I Won't Last a Day Without You"/"Let Me Be the One" was issued as a single in December 1974 and reached No. 18 on the Billboard R&B chart while crossing over to both the Adult Contemporary chart (#39) and the mainstream Pop chart, the Billboard Hot 100 (#70). Chelsea Brown performed the song in a 1972 episode of The Two Ronnies (original broadcast 30 September 1972).

Jack Jones' version reached No. 18 on the US Easy Listening chart in 1971 (and appears on his 1972 album A Song for You). The song has also been recorded by Petula Clark (on the album Warm and Tender, 1971), Clodagh Rodgers (on Rodgers and Heart, 1971), Paul Davis (on Paul Davis, 1972), Malcolm Roberts (on Living for Life, 1973), Suzanne Lynch (on Friends with You, 1973), the Temprees (on Love Maze, 1973), Vikki Carr (on One Hell of a Woman, 1974), Joy Fleming (on This Is My Life, 1974), Johnny Mathis (as a medley with "I Won't Last a Day Without You" on his album When Will I See You Again, 1975), Cleo Laine (on Born on a Friday, 1976), Shirley Bassey (on Bassey: The EMI/UA Years 1959-1979, 1994; and And I Love You So (expanded edition), 2000), Matthew Sweet (on the various-artists tribute album If I Were a Carpenter, 1994), Diana Ross (on Last Time I Saw Him (expanded edition), 2007), and Michael Simmons (on White Lace and Promises, 2018; and the covers album Singing in My Heart, 2022).

== Chart history ==
Jack Jones

Chart (1971)	Peak position
U.S. Billboard Easy Listening	18

Al Wilson

Chart (1975)	Peak position
U.S. Billboard Hot 100	70
U.S. Billboard Easy Listening	39
U.S. Billboard R&B	18
U.S. Cash Box Top 100	61
