= Christmas Portrait =

Studio album by the Carpenters
- Released: October 13, 1978
- Recorded: 1977–1978
- Studio: A&M Studios (Los Angeles, CA); Abbey Road Studios (London, England); Evergreen Studios
- Genre: Christmas
- Length: 49:08
- Label: A&M
- Producer: Richard Carpenter, Karen Carpenter (associate)

The Carpenters chronology
Passage (1977)	Christmas Portrait (1978)	The Singles: 1974–1978 (1978)

Professional ratings
Review scores
Source	Rating
AllMusic	3.5/5 stars
MusicHound Lounge	3/5 stars
The Rolling Stone Album Guide	2/5 stars

Christmas Portrait is the first Christmas album and ninth studio album by the American music duo the Carpenters, released on October 13, 1978.

== Background ==
The album includes a revised version of the duo's signature Christmas song, "Merry Christmas Darling", featuring re-recorded vocals by Karen Carpenter (done at her request). It also includes one of two versions of "Santa Claus Is Comin' to Town".

A slower version of "Santa Claus Is Comin' to Town", recorded in 1974, as well as other unused songs recorded during this album's sessions, were issued on the Carpenters' 1984 Christmas album, An Old-Fashioned Christmas.

=== Album artwork ===
The original album cover by Robert Tanenbaum is modeled on Norman Rockwell's 1960 painting "Triple Self-Portrait", done as a cover for The Saturday Evening Post.

=== Reissues ===
The standard CD version of Christmas Portrait, first issued in 1984, is a "Special Edition" compendium of selected tracks from the Carpenters' two Christmas albums into one 70-minute program, with tracks from each interspersed in the running order; "Ave Maria" was remixed at this time in order to include a choral track that vanished in 1978 and was later found.

A CD of the original LP content was briefly issued exclusively in West Germany around the same time.

In 1996, a two-CD set titled Christmas Collection was issued internationally, containing Christmas Portrait and An Old-Fashioned Christmas together with their original respective track listings.

== Commercial performance ==
On April 16, 1998, Christmas Portrait was certified Platinum by the RIAA for shipment of one million copies in the United States since its 1978 release.

In December 2011, Christmas Portrait: Special Edition re-entered the Billboard 200 album sales chart at No. 150 and eventually achieved a new chart peak position of No. 126. In December 2012 and then, in December 2013, the album again re-entered the Billboard 200 album sales chart and attained a new chart peak position of No. 114. In January 2019, it reached a new peak position of No. 67 on the Billboard 200. The original Christmas Portrait has not been available on its own in the US since the late-90's, when the cassette version was discontinued, so the chart action in the 2010s is for the 1984 compilation. In January 2020, it reached another new peak position of No. 56 on the Billboard 200.

By the end of November 2014, Christmas Portrait: Special Edition was the twenty-third best-selling Christmas/holiday album in the U.S. during the SoundScan era of music sales tracking (March 1991 to present), having sold 1,950,000 copies according to SoundScan.

== Reception ==
In their review, Cashbox called it "an appealing easy listening album which should be an attractive holiday package for Carpenters fans. Supported by elegant orchestral arrangements and the Tom Bahler Chorale, Karen and Richard sing their way through such Christmas favorites as "Jingle Bells," "Silent Night," "Sleigh Ride' and "Silver Bells."

AllMusic noted that the duo "did it in superb style here, illuminated throughout by the delightful, complex, often playful arrangements...Actually, for a change on a Carpenters album, Richard is the dominant personality on display across this record, as both co-arranger and producer, as well as the mastermind behind the project; Karen Carpenter's voice is also prominent, to be sure... but it's Richard who comes to the fore everywhere here, in ways that are impossible to ignore. There's not a slack moment on this album."

== Personnel ==
- Vocals: Karen Carpenter, Richard Carpenter
- Guitar: Bob Bain, Tony Peluso, Tommy Tedesco
- Bass: Joe Osborn
- Keyboards: Richard Carpenter, Pete Jolly
- Drums: Cubby O'Brien, Ron Tutt
- Saxophone: Bob Messenger
- Oboe: Earl Dumler, John Ellis
- Harp: Gayle Levant, Dorothy Remsen
- Backing Vocals: Tom Bahler Chorale

== Track listing ==
Side one
No.	Title	Writer(s)	Length
1.	"O Come, O Come, Emmanuel"	Traditional; R. Carpenter^{[a]}	0:28
2.	"Deck the Halls (With Boughs of Holly)"/"I Saw Three Ships"/"Have Yourself a Merry Little Christmas"/"God Rest Ye Merry Gentlemen"/"Away in a Manger (Luther's Cradle Hymn)"/"What Child Is This? (Greensleeves)"/"Carol of the Bells"/"O Come All Ye Faithful" (overture)	Traditional / Traditional; David Overton / Ralph Blane; Hugh Martin / Traditional / Traditional; James R. Murray / William Chatterton Dix / Mykola Dmytrovych Leontovych; Peter Wilhousky; Nick Perito^{[a]}; Peter Knight^{[a]} / John Francis Wade; Frederick Oakeley	4:38
3.	"Christmas Waltz"	Sammy Cahn; Jule Styne	2:15
4.	"Sleigh Ride"	Leroy Anderson; Mitchell Parish	2:39
5.	"It's Christmas Time"/"Sleep Well, Little Children"	Al Stillman; Victor Young / Alan Bergman; Leon Klatzkin	2:53
6.	"Have Yourself a Merry Little Christmas"	Blane; Martin	3:55
7.	"Santa Claus Is Comin' to Town"	John Frederick Coots; Haven Gillespie	1:05
8.	"Christmas Song (Chestnuts Roasting on an Open Fire)"	Mel Tormé; Robert Wells	3:39
9.	"Silent Night"	Franz Xaver Gruber; Joseph Mohr; John Freeman Young; Knight^{[a]}	3:19

Side two
No.	Title	Writer(s)	Length
10.	"Jingle Bells"	James Pierpont; Knight^{[a]}	1:10
11.	"First Snowfall"/"Let It Snow! Let It Snow! Let It Snow!"	Sonny Burke; Paul Francis Webster / Cahn; Styne	3:35
12.	"Carol of the Bells"	Leontovych; Wilhousky; Perito^{[a]}; Knight^{[a]}	1:39
13.	"Merry Christmas Darling"	Frank Pooler; R. Carpenter	3:05
14.	"I'll Be Home for Christmas"	Kim Gannon; Walter Kent; Buck Ram	3:48
15.	"Christ Is Born"	Ray Charles; Domenico Bartolucci	3:13
16.	"Winter Wonderland"/"Silver Bells"/"White Christmas"	Felix Bernard; Richard B. Smith / Jay Livingston; Ray Evans / Irving Berlin	5:31
17.	"Ave Maria"	Johann Sebastian Bach; Charles Gounod; Knight^{[a]}	2:35

1984 Special Edition CD
No.	Title	Writer(s)	Length
1.	"It Came Upon a Midnight Clear"	Edmund Sears; Richard Storrs Willis	0:41
2.	"Happy Holiday"/"The First Noel"/"March of the Toys"/"Little Jesus"/"I Saw Mommy Kissing Santa Claus"/"O Little Town of Bethlehem"/"In Dulce Jubilo"/"Gesu Bambino (The Infant Jesus)"/"Angels We Have Heard on High" (overture)	Berlin / Traditional; R. Carpenter^{[a]} / Victor Herbert / Traditional; R. Carpenter^{[a]} / Tommie Connor / Phillips Brooks; Lewis Redner / Traditional; R. Carpenter^{[a]} / Pietro Yon / Traditional; R. Carpenter^{[a]}	8:16
3.	"An Old-Fashioned Christmas"	R.Carpenter; John Bettis	2:11
4.	"The Christmas Waltz"	Cahn; Styne	2:11
5.	"Sleigh Ride"	Anderson; Parish	2:39
6.	"It's Christmas Time"/"Sleep Well, Little Children"	Stillman; Young / Bergman; Klatzkin	2:53
7.	"Have Yourself a Merry Little Christmas"	Blane; Martin	3:54
8.	"Santa Claus Is Coming to Town"	Coots; Gillespie	1:05
9.	"The Christmas Song (Chestnuts Roasting on an Open Fire)"	Tormé; Wells	3:39
10.	"Carol of the Bells"	Leontovych; Wilhousky; Perito^{[a]}; Knight^{[a]}	1:39
11.	"Merry Christmas Darling"	Pooler; R. Carpenter	3:07
12.	"Christ Is Born"	Charles; Bartolucci	3:13
13.	"O Holy Night"	Adolphe Adam; R. Carpenter^{[a]}	3:10
14.	"(There's No Place Like) Home for the Holidays"	Stillman; Robert Allen	2:36
15.	"Here Comes Santa Claus"/"Frosty the Snowman"/"Rudolph the Red-Nosed Reindeer"/"Good King Wenceslas" (medley)	Gene Autry; Oakley Haldeman / Steve Nelson; Jack Rollins / Johnny Marks / John Mason Neale; R. Carpenter^{[a]}	3:42
16.	"Winter Wonderland"/"Silver Bells"/"White Christmas"	Bernard; Smith / Livingston; Evans / Berlin	5:28
17.	"Ave Maria"	Bach; Gounod; Knight^{[a]}	2:34
18.	"Overture Miniature"/"Dance of the Sugar Plum Fairy"/"Valse des fleurs" (selections from Nutcracker)	Pyotr Ilyich Tchaikovsky; R. Carpenter^{[a]}	5:27
19.	"Little Altar Boy"	Howlett Peter Smith	3:43
20.	"I'll Be Home for Christmas"	Gannon; Kent; Ram	3:49
21.	"Silent Night"	Gruber; Mohr; Young; Knight^{[a]}	3:20

Notes

- ^{^a} signifies adapted by

== Singles ==
=== "Merry Christmas Darling" ===
- US 7" single (1970) – A&M 1236
1. "Merry Christmas Darling"
2. "Mr. Guder" also "Santa Claus Is Coming to Town" the original slow down vocal version was the B side A&M 1648 released a year later
- UK 7" single (1971) – AME601
1. "Merry Christmas Darling"
2. "Ticket to Ride"
3. "Saturday"
- UK 7" single (1990) – AM716
1. "Merry Christmas Darling"
2. "(They Long to Be) Close to You"
- UK 7" single (1990) – AMS716
1. "Merry Christmas Darling"
2. "(They Long to Be) Close to You"
- UK 12" single (1990) – AMY716
1. "Merry Christmas Darling"
2. "You're the One"
3. "(They Long to Be) Close to You"
- UK CD single (1990) – AMCD716
1. "Merry Christmas Darling"
2. "(They Long to Be) Close to You"
3. "You're the One"

=== "Christmas Song" ===
- US 7" single (1977) – A&M 1991
1. "Christmas Song"
2. "Merry Christmas Darling"
- JP 7" single (1977) – CM-2083
1. "Christmas Song"
2. "Merry Christmas Darling"
- JP CD single (1996) – PODM-1059
1. "Christmas Song"
2. "Winter Wonderland/Silver Bells/White Christmas"

=== "Silent Night" ===
- JP 7" single (1978) – AMP 1012
1. "Silent Night"
2. "Jingle Bells"
3. "Ave Maria"

=== "Ave Maria" ===
- JP CD single (1996) – PODM-1065
1. "Ave Maria"
2. "Merry Christmas Darling"

== Charts ==
Chart performance for Christmas Portrait
Chart (1978–2023)	Peak position
Canadian Albums (Billboard)	74
US Billboard 200	56
US Top Holiday Albums	5
US Cash Box Top 200 Albums	135
