= Looking for Love (Karen Carpenter song) =

Single by Karen Carpenter
- B-side: "I’ll be Yours"
- Released: 1966
- Recorded: 1966
- Genre: Soft rock
- Length: 1:52 (A); 2:25 (B)
- Label: Magic Lamp
- Songwriter: Richard Carpenter
- Producer: Joe Osborn

Karen Carpenter singles chronology
"Looking for Love" (1966)	"Ticket to Ride" (1969)

"Looking for Love" b/w "I’ll Be Yours" is a single released under Karen Carpenter's name by the early incarnations of the Carpenters.

== Background ==
The songs on the single were written by Karen's brother, Richard Carpenter and were recorded in 1966, when Karen was 16.

== Release ==
The single was released by a small label Magic Lamp under "Karen Carpenter" name despite the involvement of Richard Carpenter.

Only 500 copies of the 45 rpm single were pressed. The single did not chart commercially, and it led the label Magic Lamp to defunct.

The single was later included on the 1991 Carpenters box set From the Top. According to the liner notes for the album From the Top, the master tapes for these recordings were lost in a fire at Joe Osborn's house in 1974. All CD reissues have been made from a 45 rpm copy owned by Richard Carpenter.
