= Little Altar Boy =

Single by Carpenters

from the album An Old-Fashioned Christmas
- B-side: "Do You Hear What I Hear?"
- Released: 1984
- Recorded: February 13, 1978
- Genre: Pop, seasonal
- Label: A&M; 1940
- Songwriter: Howlett Peter Smith
- Producer: Richard Carpenter

Carpenters singles chronology
"Now" (1984)	"Little Altar Boy" (1984)	"Honolulu City Lights" (1986)

"Little Altar Boy" is a song written by Howlett Peter Smith, in 1961 and first recorded that year by vocalist Vic Dana for his album This Is Vic Dana. In an introspective moment, Dana performs this quiet song in the 1962 musical-comedy film Don't Knock the Twist.

== Background ==
The song is about a man who has done wrong who goes to church to ask an altar boy to pray for him for his past sins, and to ask for forgiveness by wanting to become holy as him. Smith later revised the title and lyrics to, "Little Holy Child", due to the situation in the Catholic Church as it pertains to priests and altar boys.

== Chart performance ==
"Little Altar Boy" was released as a single, it reached number 45 on the Billboard Hot 100 chart.

== Cover versions ==
- The song was also recorded by Andy Williams on his 1965 album Merry Christmas
- Glen Campbell on his 1968 album That Christmas Feeling
- Jack Jones on his 1969 album A Jack Jones Christmas.
- A cover version by the Carpenters was released in 1984, after Karen Carpenter's death. The song was released as a promotional single from the Christmas album An Old-Fashioned Christmas; it failed to chart. Because of Karen's death, there was no music video shot for this song.
