= An Old-Fashioned Christmas =

Studio album by the Carpenters
- Released: October 26, 1984
- Recorded: 1974, 1978, 1984
- Genre: Christmas
- Length: 48:48
- Label: A&M
- Producer: Richard Carpenter, Karen Carpenter, Jack Daugherty

The Carpenters chronology
Voice of the Heart (1983)	An Old-Fashioned Christmas (1984)	Yesterday Once More (1984)

An Old-Fashioned Christmas is the second Christmas album and twelfth studio album by the American music duo the Carpenters, released on October 26, 1984. It is also the second posthumous release after the 1983 death of singer and drummer Karen Carpenter.

Professional ratings
Review scores
Source	Rating
AllMusic	4.5/5 stars

== Background ==
The album project had its genesis in six unused tracks featuring Karen's vocals from the Carpenters' previous Christmas album, 1978's Christmas Portrait. Richard Carpenter took these tracks and recorded new material of instrumental and choral music to make it into a full-length album. The album includes the slower version of "Santa Claus Is Comin' to Town", a different version of which was previously released on Christmas Portrait.

=== Reissues ===
A 1984 expanded CD reissue of Christmas Portrait included eight tracks from An Old-Fashioned Christmas. In 1996 a two-CD set, Christmas Collection, was issued containing both albums in their original running order. The album has been repeatedly re-issued; it was issued in Japan in 2022.

== Reception ==
Billboard noted "the duo's second Christmas album, following their gold Christmas Portrait, consists of previously unreleased tracks, save for a shimmering version of "Santa Claus Is Coming To Town." Although less consistent than the earlier set, this collection features several indispensable tracks with the late Karen Carpenter singing lead, most notably a heartbreaking "Little Altar Boy."

AllMusic rated it four and a half stars out of five, noting that "their second Christmas album, with more of the soft sounds of the season, is made for mistletoe and someone you love."

== Track listing ==
All lead vocals by Karen Carpenter, except where noted; all tracks produced by Richard Carpenter except "Santa Claus Is Comin' to Town" by Jack Daugherty, Richard Carpenter, and Karen Carpenter.

Side one
No.	Title	Writer(s)	Length
1.	"It Came Upon a Midnight Clear" (lead vocals: R. Carpenter)	Edmund Sears; Richard Storrs Willis	0:43
2.	"Overture: Happy Holiday / The First Noel / March of the Toys / Little Jesus/ I Saw Mommy Kissing Santa Claus / O Little Town of Bethlehem / In Dulce Jubilo / Gesu Bambino (The Infant Jesus) / Angels We Have Heard on High"	Berlin / Traditional; R. Carpenter^{[a]} / Victor Herbert / Traditional; R. Carpenter^{[a]} / Tommie Connor / Phillips Brooks; Lewis Redner / Traditional; R. Carpenter^{[a]} / Pietro Yon / Traditional; R. Carpenter^{[a]}	8:13
3.	"An Old-Fashioned Christmas" (lead vocals: R. Carpenter)	R. Carpenter; John Bettis	2:14
4.	"O Holy Night" (instrumental)	Adolphe Adam; R. Carpenter^{[a]}	3:31
5.	"(There's No Place Like) Home for the Holidays"	Al Stillman; Robert Allen	2:13
6.	"Medley: Here Comes Santa Claus / Frosty the Snowman / Rudolph the Red-Nosed Reindeer / Good King Wenceslas" (instrumental)	Gene Autry; Oakley Haldeman / Steve Nelson; Jack Rollins / Johnny Marks / John Mason Neale; R. Carpenter^{[a]}	3:43
7.	"Little Altar Boy"	Howlett Peter Smith	3:43

Side two
No.	Title	Writer(s)	Length
8.	"Do You Hear What I Hear?" (lead vocals: K. and R. Carpenter)	Gloria Shayne; Noël Regney	2:53
9.	"My Favorite Things" (instrumental)	Richard Rodgers; Oscar Hammerstein II	3:53
10.	"He Came Here for Me"	Ron Nelson	2:12
11.	"Santa Claus Is Coming to Town" (lead vocals: K. and R. Carpenter)	John Frederick Coots; Haven Gillespie	4:04
12.	"What Are You Doing New Year's Eve?"	Frank Loesser	2:51
13.	"Selections from The Nutcracker: Overture Miniature / Dance of the Sugar Plum Fairy / Trepak / Valse des fleurs" (instrumental)	Pyotr Ilyich Tchaikovsky; R. Carpenter^{[a]}	6:14
14.	"I Heard the Bells on Christmas Day"	Henry Wadsworth Longfellow; Johnny Marks	2:21

Notes

- ^{^a} signifies adapted by

== Singles ==
1. "Santa Claus Is Coming to Town" (A&M SP-1648): US 7-inch single (1974)
  1. "Santa Claus Is Coming to Town"
  2. "Merry Christmas Darling"
2. "Little Altar Boy" (A&M SP-2700): US 7-inch single (1984)
  1. "Little Altar Boy"
  2. "Do You Hear What I Hear?"

== Personnel ==
- Bass: Joe Osborn
- Keyboards: Richard Carpenter, Pete Jolly
- Drums: Barry Morgan, Ron Tutt
- Saxophone: John Francis Phillips
- Double Bass: Pete Morgan
- Harp: Skaila Kanga, Gayle Levant
- Backing Vocals: The English Chorale, conductors Dick Bolks and Robert Howes

== Charts ==
Chart (1984)	Peak position
US Billboard Pop Albums	190
US Cash Box Top 200 Albums	178

Chart (1987)	Peak position
US Top Holiday Albums	25

Chart (1993)	Peak position
US Top Pop Catalog Albums	46
