= Lovelines =

Studio album by the Carpenters
- Released: October 31, 1989
- Recorded: 1977–1989
- Studios: A&R Recording (New York City); A&M (Hollywood); Kendun Recorders (Burbank)
- Genre: Pop
- Length: 46:24
- Label: A&M
- Producers: Phil Ramone, Richard Carpenter

The Carpenters chronology
Yesterday Once More (1984)	Lovelines (1989)	Only Yesterday (1990)

Singles from Lovelines
- 1. "Honolulu City Lights" Released: 1986; 2. "If I Had You" Released: 1989

Professional ratings
Review scores
Source	Rating
AllMusic	3/5 stars
The Encyclopedia of Popular Music	2/5 stars
MusicHound Rock: The Essential Album Guide	2/5 stars
Rolling Stone	3/5 stars

Lovelines is the thirteenth studio album by the American music duo the Carpenters, released on October 31, 1989. It was the third Carpenters posthumous album released after the death of Karen Carpenter to feature entirely unreleased material.

== Background ==
The album was assembled by Richard Carpenter from various studio outtakes along with selected solo tracks by Karen from her then-unreleased solo album.

"You're the One" is an outtake from 1977 album Passage.

"Honolulu City Lights", "Slow Dance" and "Where Do I Go from Here?" are from 1978 sessions.

"Kiss Me the Way You Did Last Night" and "The Uninvited Guest" are outtakes from Made in America, the studio album released in 1981 and the last completed during Karen's lifetime.

Two songs were taken from Carpenters television specials. "Little Girl Blue" is taken from 1978 Space Encounters TV special. "When I Fall in Love" was also originally recorded in 1978 for that TV special, but used later in Music, Music, Music! in 1980.

The album also includes four Carpenters interpretations of songs from Karen Carpenter's solo recordings: the title track, "If I Had You", "If We Try" and "Remember When Lovin' Took All Night".

"You're the One" and "Where Do I Go from Here?" were previously used in the TV movie The Karen Carpenter Story.

== Critical reception ==
Rolling Stone wrote that Karen's solo tracks were "liberating. Ramone recorded her in leaner, decidedly unsaccharine settings and, in effect, got rid of her music's otherwise characteristic bad aftertaste. As Karen's cozy contralto pulses through the come-hither "Lovelines," the hearth-warm "If We Try" (both written by Rod Temperton, whose credits also include "Rock With You" and "Thriller") and the saltier "If I Had You," her vocals come damn close to soulful. Listening to them, it becomes apparent why singers like Chrissie Hynde, Madonna and Gloria Estefan have "come out of the closet" and admitted they were Karen fans...voices like Karen Carpenter's never really go out of style; Lovelines reveals just a few of the avenues that would have been open to her. But sadly, the Seventies never really ended for Karen Carpenter; she died before she could shed the goody-two-shoes image that shrouded her immense talent. As such, Lovelines becomes her essential epitaph.

In their review of the album, Billboard stated that "one listen and it's clear that no one - the closest is Gloria Estefan - has filled the void left after Karen's death in 1983. There's a good reason why some of the syrupy material was never released, but other tracks, like first single "If I Had You," the classic "When I Fall In Love," and "Where Do I Go From Here," instantly recall why the duo was one of the most successful of the '70s."

Allmusic noted that "When I Fall in Love" brings a tear to the eye as it captures that indefinable and completely unique quality that Karen brought to each song she sang. While the material in this compilation is not sensational or ground-breaking, it is definitely a sentimental selection of tunes that go easy on the ear."

== Track listing ==
Side one
No.	Title	Writer(s)	Length
1.	"Lovelines"	Rod Temperton	4:28
2.	"Where Do I Go from Here?"	Parker McGee	4:24
3.	"The Uninvited Guest"	Buddy Kaye; Jeffrey M. Tweel	4:24
4.	"If We Try"	Rod Temperton	3:42
5.	"When I Fall in Love"	Edward Heyman; Victor Young	3:08
6.	"Kiss Me the Way You Did Last Night"	Margaret Dorn; Lynda Lawley	4:03

Side two
No.	Title	Writer(s)	Length
7.	"Remember When Lovin' Took All Night"	John Farrar; Molly-Ann Leiken	3:47
8.	"You're the One"	Steve Ferguson	4:13
9.	"Honolulu City Lights"	Keola Beamer	3:19
10.	"Slow Dance"	Philip Margo; Mitchell Margo	3:35
11.	"If I Had You"	Richard Carpenter; Steve Dorff; Gary Harju; Larry Herbstritt	3:57
12.	"Little Girl Blue"	Lorenz Hart; Richard Rodgers	3:24

== Personnel ==
- Vocals: Karen Carpenter
- Guitar: David Brown, Russell Javors, Eric Rasumussen, Tim May, Tony Peluso, David Williams. Pedal Steel: JayDee Maness
- Bass: Louis Johnson, Joe Osborn, Doug Stegmeyer
- Keyboards: Richard Carpenter, Pete Jolly, Rob Mounsey, Greg Phillinganes
- Drums: Liberty DeVitto, Cubby O'Brien, John Robinson, Ron Tutt
- Percussion: Paulinho da Costa, Ralph MacDonald, Airto Moreira
- Saxophone: Michael Brecker
- Oboe, English Horn: Earl Dumler
- Flute: John Phillips
- Harp – Gayle Levant
- Backing Vocals: Siedah Garrett, The O.K. Chorale

== Charts ==
Chart performance for Lovelines
Chart (1990)	Peak position
Australian Albums (ARIA)	110
UK Albums (Official Charts)	73
