= If I Had You (Karen Carpenter song) =

Single by Karen Carpenter

from the album Lovelines
- B-side: "Lovelines"
- Released: 1989
- Recorded: 1979
- Studio: A&R (New York City); A&M (Hollywood, California); Kendun Recorders (Burbank, California)
- Genre: Pop
- Label: A&M; 1940
- Songwriter(s): Steve Dorff, Gary Harju, Larry Herbstritt
- Producer(s): Phil Ramone

Karen Carpenter singles chronology
"Honolulu City Lights" (1986)	"If I Had You" (1989)	"Let Me Be the One" (1991)

"If I Had You" is a song recorded by singer Karen Carpenter during her solo sessions in New York with producer Phil Ramone for her subsequently shelved debut solo album.

== Release ==
In 1989 "If I Had You" was released as single from the 1989 Carpenters Lovelines album, however was credited to Karen Carpenter as solo artist. The Lovelines version of the song featured Richard Carpenter's remix ending.

The original Karen's version, featuring the fade-out ending has only appeared on Karen Carpenter's 1996 solo album.

== Charts ==
Chart (1989)	Peak position
US Billboard Adult Contemporary	18
