= Close to You (The Carpenters album) =

1970 album by The Carpenters

Studio album by the Carpenters
- Released: August 19, 1970
- Recorded: November 5, 1969 – July 28, 1970
- Studio: A&M (Hollywood)
- Genre: Pop
- Length: 38:37
- Label: A&M/Polydor
- Producer: Jack Daugherty

The Carpenters chronology
Offering/Ticket to Ride (1969)	Close to You (1970)	Carpenters (1971)

Singles from Close to You
- 1. "(They Long to Be) Close to You" Released: May 15, 1970; 2. "We've Only Just Begun" Released: August 21, 1970

Close to You is the second studio album by the American music duo the Carpenters, released on August 19, 1970. In 2003, the album was ranked No. 175 on Rolling Stone's list of the 500 greatest albums of all time, maintaining the rating in a 2012 revised list. The album contains the hit singles "(They Long to Be) Close to You" and "We've Only Just Begun". The success of the title track earned Carpenters an international reputation. The album topped the Canadian Albums Chart and peaked at #2 on the U.S. Billboard albums chart. It was also successful in the United Kingdom, entering the top 50 of the official chart for 76 weeks during the first half of the 1970s.

The album and its singles earned Carpenters eight Grammy Award nominations including Album of the Year, Song of the Year and Record of the Year. Carpenters won the Best New Artist and Best Contemporary Vocal Performance by a Duo, Group or Chorus for the album.

== Background and song information ==
According to session drummer Hal Blaine, the Carpenters' parents were in the recording studio for the Close to You album and "you could tell right away they ruled the roost." Blaine said that Karen's mother dictated her singing style and was unhappy that Karen did not perform as a drummer for all of the songs. Blaine countered that although Karen was a capable drummer, she was accustomed to playing loudly for live performances and thus was unfamiliar with the requirements of recording in a professional studio. However, she had been informed beforehand of Blaine's involvement and indicated her approval.

"(They Long to Be) Close to You" was the first Burt Bacharach/Hal David composition, with some original lyrics by Cathy Steeves, that Carpenters covered. The song was recorded several times by various artists during the 1960s but without popular success. It became Carpenters' first RIAA-certified Gold single, as well as their first Billboard Hot 100 single to reach the top 10. It remained at #1 for four weeks and became one of the Carpenters' most iconic songs. Richard devoted the song to Karen.

"We've Only Just Begun", composed by Paul Williams and Roger Nichols, first appeared in a 1970 Crocker-Citizens Bank commercial that depicted a married couple beginning their life together. In August 1970, it became Carpenters' second RIAA-certified Gold single.

Originally written by Ralph Carmichael for the early contemporary Christian musical Tell It Like It Is, "Love Is Surrender" was a song that Richard and Karen heard during their teenage years.

"Maybe It's You" was written by Richard Carpenter and John Bettis for their previous band Spectrum. The oboe solo was played by Doug Strawn.

"Reason to Believe" was composed by Tim Hardin in the 1960s, and Rod Stewart charted with a version of the song in 1971. Karen loved the song because it was among the first that she performed with Richard as a group.

"Help!" was written by John Lennon and Paul McCartney in early 1965, one of four Beatles covers that Carpenters recorded; the others were "Ticket to Ride", "Can't Buy Me Love" and "Nowhere Man".

"Baby It's You" was composed by Burt Bacharach, Barney Williams, and Mack David. It was sung by Richard and Karen in 1970 and performed on their television show Make Your Own Kind of Music.

"I'll Never Fall in Love Again" is another Bacharach composition and was included in a medley on the following year's album Carpenters. The song was originally included in the score for Bacharach and David's 1968 musical Promises, Promises, and Dionne Warwick's version hit the top ten in January 1970.

"Crescent Noon", composed by Richard Carpenter and John Bettis, was originally performed by Karen and Richard when they were members of the California State University, Long Beach choir in 1969.

"Mr. Guder" was dedicated to Vic Guder, Richard and Bettis's boss at Disneyland who had fired them. They had been hired to play old-time music on piano and banjo at the park's "Coke Corner" on Main Street, U.S.A., but they persisted in playing contemporary songs that the patrons requested.

== Critical reception ==
Professional ratings
Review scores
Source	Rating
AllMusic	4/5 stars
MusicHound Lounge	2/5 stars
The Rolling Stone Album Guide	2.5/5 stars

Close to You was nominated for Record of the Year and Album of the Year at the 13th annual Grammy awards. "Close to You" won Carpenters a Grammy for Best New Artist and another Grammy for Best Contemporary Vocal Performance by a Duo, Group or Chorus that same year.

In their review, Billboard noted that "Karen and Richard Carpenter have taken the music world by storm with their beautiful "Close to You" million seller and they are on their way to repeating that success with their current "We've Only Just Begun". Their smooth blend of voices is evident throughout this LP which includes both those hits and they should skyrocket up the best selling album charts."

Cashbox stated that "this is, in fact, the Carpenters' second album. The first, Offering was released with little fanfare, and so was passed by a lot of people. No one will pass this one by, which just goes to show what a hit single can do. So it goes. A good deck, this one, with the title hit, Tim Hardin's "Reason To Believe," Beatles' "Help," and Bacharach-David's "Baby It's You" and "I'll Never Fall In Love Again." Much of the LP features some fine material penned by Richard Carpenter. All in all this offering is fully as good as the first."

AllMusic's retrospective review deemed Close to You "a surprisingly strong album," particularly praising Richard Carpenter's original compositions "Maybe It's You", "Crescent Noon" and "Mr. Guder", describing them as superlative displays of both Karen Carpenter's vocal work and Richard's arranging talents.

== Track listing ==
All lead vocals by Karen Carpenter except where noted.

Side one
No.	Title	Writer(s)	Length
1.	"We've Only Just Begun" (lead vocals: Karen and Richard Carpenter)	Roger Nichols; Paul Williams	3:04
2.	"Love Is Surrender" (lead vocals: Karen and Richard Carpenter)	Ralph Carmichael	1:59
3.	"Maybe It's You"	Richard Carpenter; John Bettis	3:09
4.	"Reason to Believe"	Tim Hardin	3:02
5.	"Help"	Lennon–McCartney	3:02
6.	"(They Long to Be) Close to You"	Burt Bacharach; Hal David	4:34
Total length:			18:50

Side two
No.	Title	Writer(s)	Length
7.	"Baby It's You"	Bacharach; Mack David; Barney Williams	2:50
8.	"I'll Never Fall in Love Again"	Bacharach; H. David	2:56
9.	"Crescent Noon"	Carpenter; Bettis	4:09
10.	"Mr. Guder"	Carpenter; Bettis	3:17
11.	"I Kept On Loving You" (lead vocals: Richard Carpenter)	Nichols; Williams	2:13
12.	"Another Song"	Carpenter; Bettis	4:22
Total length:			19:47

== Personnel ==
- Karen Carpenter – vocals, drums
- Richard Carpenter – vocals, keyboards, arrangements and orchestration
- Louis Shelton – guitar
- Joe Osborn, Danny Woodhams – bass guitar
- Hal Blaine – drums
- Jim Horn – woodwinds
- Chuck Findley – flugelhorn
- Bob Messenger – woodwinds
- Doug Strawn – woodwinds

=== Technical ===
- Jack Daugherty – producer
- Ray Gerhardt – engineer
- Dick Bogert – engineer
- Tom Wilkes – art direction
- Kessel/Brehm Photography – photography
- Bernie Grundman, Richard Carpenter – remastering at Bernie Grundman Mastering

== Charts ==
=== Weekly charts ===
Chart (1971–1973)	Peak position
Australian Albums (Kent Music Report)	16
Canada Top Albums/CDs (RPM)	1
Japanese Albums (Oricon)	53
UK Albums (Official Charts)	23
US Billboard 200	2
US Cash Box Top 200 Albums	1

=== Year-end charts ===
Chart (1971)	Position
US Billboard 200	3

== Certifications ==
Region	Certification	Certified units/sales
Australia (ARIA)	Gold	20,000^{^}
United Kingdom (BPI)	Gold	100,000^{^}
United States (RIAA)	2× Platinum	2,000,000^{^}
Summaries
Worldwide	—	4,000,000
^{^} Shipments figures based on certification alone.
