= Carpenters (album) =

- Cover used for North American and certain international editions

Studio album by the Carpenters
- Released: May 14, 1971
- Recorded: 1970–1971
- Studio: A&M (Hollywood)
- Genres: Pop; soft rock; easy listening; adult contemporary
- Length: 31:26
- Label: A&M
- Producer: Jack Daugherty

The Carpenters chronology
Close to You (1970)	Carpenters (1971)	A Song for You (1972)

Singles from Carpenters
- 1. "For All We Know" Released: January 15, 1971; 2. "Rainy Days and Mondays" Released: April 23, 1971; 3. "Superstar" Released: August 12, 1971

Carpenters is the third studio album by American music duo the Carpenters. Released on May 14, 1971, it was their most successful studio album, reaching number two on the Billboard 200 chart and number 12 in the UK, as well as being certified quadruple platinum by the Recording Industry Association of America. The album contained the hit songs "For All We Know", "Rainy Days and Mondays", and "Superstar".

The strength of these recordings reportedly is what caused Richard Carpenter to ask his sister to front the band for their live performances instead of playing behind the drums. Among many fans, the album has simply been referred to as "the Tan Album", because the original LP cover, complete with overlapping flap, looked like an oversized tan envelope, and is presumably a play on the Beatles' so-called White Album. In most countries outside of North America, an image of the Carpenters was instead used for the cover art.

In Cash Box's Top 100 Albums of 1971, Carpenters was listed as one of the year's 10 biggest albums. This is the first album to feature the familiar Carpenters logo.

All lead vocals are by Karen, except on the tracks "Druscilla Penny", "Saturday", and the "Walk on By" segment of the Bacharach/David Medley, in which Richard Carpenter sings lead vocal, with Karen in the background.

The album and its singles earned Carpenters four Grammy Award nominations, including Album of the Year. It won the Best Contemporary Vocal Performance by a Duo, Group, or Chorus.

== Critical reception ==
Professional ratings
Review scores
Source	Rating
AllMusic	3/5 stars
MusicHound Lounge	2.5/5 stars
Rolling Stone	(Mixed)
The Rolling Stone Album Guide	4/5 stars
Tom Hull – on the Web	C

Rolling Stone noted, "'Rainy Days and Mondays'...is a superb example of the craft of MOR music. The melody is more than catchy: it is downright memorable. Richard Carpenter's arrangement uses woodwinds as the perfect counterpoint to his own, sensitive electric piano playing. And once again, Karen Carpenter's vocal is central to the record's success." However, the review was quite critical of the album as a whole, stating, "unfortunately, the album shows that the Carpenters are as depressingly ordinary as you all knew they were in the first place. I don't know what it is they do different when they are making album cuts instead of singles, but whatever it is, they should stop it instantly." The magazine later added the album to its list of the 500 greatest albums of all time.

The Billboard review noted, "Richard's sophisticated, contemporary arrangements and Karen's sparkling voice are the essence of the Carpenters' great success. These trademarks abound in their third LP, which features the million-selling 'For All We Know', the current hit, 'Rainy Days and Mondays', a lovely Bacharach-David medley, Leon Russell and Bonnie Bramlett's 'Superstar', and 'One Love', which was co-written by Richard."

Cashbox stated, "Karen and Richard Carpenter can do no wrong and this is their latest bit of rightdoing. It consists of 10 songs, all done up in their fresh and inimitable fashion. Oscar winner 'For All We Know' and their current hit 'Rainy Days and Mondays' are included, along with the Leon Russell-Bonnie Bramlett penned 'Superstar' and a Bacharach/David medley, which is a joy to hear. As if the record weren't enough, there's a beautiful open-out cover featuring a color portrait of the duo. Should be the Carpenters' biggest album."

AllMusic called the album "the group's ace card...Carpenters features more breezy melodies marked by rich arrangements and beautiful lead vocals, courtesy of siblings Richard Carpenter and Karen Carpenter, respectively. Even more commercially streamlined than its predecessors, Carpenters is a classic of early-'70s pop."

== Songs ==
=== "Rainy Days and Mondays" ===
The music of "Rainy Days and Mondays" was composed by Roger Nichols, and the lyrics were written by Paul Williams, who later recorded his own version of the song. It was released as a single and charted well in the United States at number two on the Billboard Hot 100. "Rainy Days and Mondays" was the Carpenters' second Nichols/Williams hit, after "We've Only Just Begun" of the Close to You album the previous year.

=== "Saturday" ===
"Saturday" is a short, upbeat song with a runtime of 1:18. It was used as the B-side of "Rainy Days and Mondays". The song talks about how joyful Saturday is, and how joyful it is to finish Friday. In the 1973 TV special Robert Young with the Young, Richard and Karen performed "Saturday" and talked about its meaning. They also debuted their cover of the Sesame Street song "Sing".

=== "Let Me Be the One" ===
"Let Me Be the One" was remixed in 1991, with an extended beginning and end, and a different piano line. This remix can only be found on the From the Top box set. It starts with Richard counting off, and Richard's piano line is different from the original mix. The fadeout is also removed. The reason Karen stopped singing suddenly in this version is because she forgets the words, which is why she says something about "where I can figure out where the melody is, I'll sing it"...

Richard states he has little doubt the song would have been a hit if it were released as a single.

"Let Me Be the One" was a 1971 Easy Listening chart selection for Jack Jones.

=== "(A Place To) Hideaway" ===
"(A Place To) Hideaway" is a song originally written and composed by Randy Sparks, the founder of the New Christy Minstrels, songwriter, performer and owner of a nightclub in Westwood, Los Angeles, California. According to Richard Carpenter, Randy Sparks was the opening act for Richard Carpenter at his club in Westwood in late 1967-early 1968. Sparks had played "(A Place To) Hideaway" for the duo. Three years later, Richard remembered the tune and felt it would be suited for the album. The Carpenters performed it on their television series, Make Your Own Kind of Music on August 10, 1971, on a set where Karen wears a white and red ensemble with a dark blue background with a big letter "K".

=== "For All We Know" ===
"For All We Know" had been written and composed by Fred Karlin, James Arthur Griffin (credited as Arthur James), and Robb Wilson Royer (credited as Robb Wilson) for the film Lovers and Other Strangers. It was used during the wedding sequence, where it was sung by the relatively undiscovered Larry Meredith. The Carpenters released their version as a single in January 1971. Later that year, the Carpenters performed it on The Andy Williams Show, with Karen in a lacy outfit with a blue background. Although the song only peaked at number three on the Billboard Hot 100, it still remains a favorite among many Carpenters fans. The video from The Andy Williams Show is not widely available, with the exception of snippets of their documentary, Close to You: Remembering the Carpenters. Perhaps mainly as a result of the hit single, "For All We Know" went on to win an Academy Award for "Best Song". James [Arthur] Griffin and Robb [Wilson] Royer of the popular '70s soft-rock group Bread petitioned the National Academy of Motion Picture Arts and Sciences to use their real names on their awards, but to no avail, as the published composer credits are under their respective pseudonyms.

=== "Superstar" ===
Written by Bonnie Bramlett and Leon Russell, "Superstar" had been made popular by Rita Coolidge in 1970, but the Carpenters' version, released as a single in August 1971, became an international hit. In the liner notes for Gold: 35th Anniversary Edition, Richard writes that he saw Bette Midler singing the song on The Tonight Show Starring Johnny Carson, and felt that it would be a perfect fit for Karen's voice. Richard did have reservations about the lyrics, however, which he found a little too suggestive. After changing "I can hardly wait to sleep with you again" to "I can hardly wait to be with you again," he recorded Karen singing the song, reading the revised lyrics from a napkin. What wound up on the finished recording was the first time Karen had ever sung "Superstar". After only the first take, Richard claimed that her performance was "perfect" as it was, and did not need repeating.

=== "One Love" ===
The music of "One Love" was composed by Richard Carpenter, and the lyrics written by John Bettis, in the late 1960s, when both had jobs at Disneyland. It was originally called "Candy". On the television series Make Your Own Kind of Music, both Karen and Richard performed the song. Richard replaced the strings solo with a live piano solo for that performance.

Richard Carpenter remixed the song by adding a heavier bassline and refining the vocals, and it was released on 2003's Carpenters Perform Carpenter. The song was also released as the B-side of "I Won't Last a Day Without You" in 1974.

== Track listing ==
All lead vocals are by Karen Carpenter except where noted.

Side one
No.	Title	Writer(s)	Length
1.	"Rainy Days and Mondays"	Roger Nichols; Paul Williams	3:40
2.	"Saturday" (lead vocals by Richard Carpenter)	John Bettis; R. Carpenter	1:20
3.	"Let Me Be the One"	Nichols; Williams	2:25
4.	"(A Place To) Hideaway"	Randy Sparks	3:40
5.	"For All We Know" (from the motion picture Lovers and Other Strangers)	Fred Karlin; Arthur James; Robb Wilson	2:34

Side two
No.	Title	Writer(s)	Length
6.	"Superstar"	Bonnie Bramlett; Leon Russell	3:49
7.	"Druscilla Penny" (lead vocals by Richard Carpenter)	Bettis; R. Carpenter	2:18
8.	"One Love"	Bettis; R. Carpenter	3:23
9.	"Knowing When to Leave"/"Make It Easy on Yourself"/"(There's) Always Something There to Remind Me"/"I'll Never Fall in Love Again"/"Walk On By"/"Do You Know the Way to San Jose" (Bacharach/David Medley)	Bacharach; David	5:25
10.	"Sometimes"	Henry Mancini; Felice Mancini	2:52

== Personnel ==
- Karen Carpenter – vocals, drums
- Richard Carpenter – arranger, piano, harpsichord, Wurlitzer electric piano, Hammond organ, vocals, orchestration
- Hal Blaine – drums
- Jim Horn – reeds
- Earl Dumler – oboe on "For All We Know" and "Superstar"
- Bob Messenger – bass, reeds
- Tommy Morgan – harmonica on "Rainy Days and Mondays"
- Joe Osborn – bass
- Doug Strawn – reeds
- Gayle Levant - harp

Technical

- Jack Daugherty – producer
- Norm Kinney – assistant engineer
- Dick Bogert – engineer
- Ray Gerhardt – engineer
- Guy Webster – photography
- Roland Young – art direction
- Bernie Grundman, Richard Carpenter – remastering at Bernie Grundman Mastering

== Accolades ==
=== Grammy Awards ===
Year	Nominee / work	Award	Result
1972	Carpenters	Best Pop Vocal Performance – Duo or Group	Won
1972	Carpenters	Album of the Year	Nominated
1972	Carpenters	Best Engineered Non-classical Album	Nominated
1972	"Superstar"	Best Instrumental Arrangement Accompanying Vocalists	Nominated

== Charts ==
=== Weekly charts ===
Chart (1971–1974)	Peak position
Australian Albums (Kent Music Report)	16
Canada Top Albums/CDs (RPM)	6
Japanese Albums (Oricon	47
UK Albums (Official Charts)	11
US Billboard 200	2
US Cash Box Top 200 Albums	2

Chart (1995)	Peak position
Scottish Albums (Official Charts)	84

=== Year-end charts ===
Chart (1971)	Position
US Billboard 200	39

Chart (1972)	Position
US Billboard 200	43

== Certifications ==
Region	Certification	Certified units/sales
Australia (ARIA)	Gold	35,000^{^}
United Kingdom (BPI)	Platinum	300,000^{*}
United States (RIAA)	4× Platinum	4,000,000^{^}
^{*} Sales figures based on certification alone.^{^} Shipments figures based on certification alone.
