= Passage (The Carpenters album) =

Studio album by The Carpenters
- Released: September 23, 1977
- Recorded: Late 1976 – mid-1977
- Studios: A&M Studios, Hollywood
- Genres: Pop, adult contemporary
- Length: 39:39
- Label: A&M
- Producer: Richard Carpenter/Associate Producer – Karen Carpenter

The Carpenters chronology
Live at the Palladium (1976)	Passage (1977)	Christmas Portrait (1978)

Singles from Passage
- 1. "All You Get from Love Is a Love Song" Released: May 2, 1977; 2. "Calling Occupants of Interplanetary Craft" Released: September 9, 1977; 3. "Sweet, Sweet Smile" Released: February 18, 1978

Passage is the eighth studio album by the American music duo the Carpenters. Released in 1977, it produced the hit singles "All You Get from Love Is a Love Song", "Calling Occupants of Interplanetary Craft" and "Sweet, Sweet Smile". The Carpenters' "Sweet, Sweet Smile" (written by Otha Young and Juice Newton) was picked up by Country radio and put the duo in the top ten of Billboard's Country chart in the spring of 1978.

This album was a considerable departure for the siblings and contained experimental material such as the Klaatu cover "Calling Occupants of Interplanetary Craft" single—which reached no. 32 in the US but was a top ten hit in much of the world (and prompted numerous letters to the Carpenters asking when World Contact Day was scheduled). The album was the group's first to fall short of gold certification in the US.

This is the only Carpenters album (aside from their Christmas albums) not to contain a Richard Carpenter or John Bettis song and also the second album to not have Karen playing drums at all. It was the first studio album since Close to You not to use the familiar Carpenters logo on the front cover, although a small version of the logo appears on the back cover.

== Background and recording ==
Prior to the album's recording, a search was made for a new Carpenters producer, prompted by the band's decreasing popularity and Richard Carpenter's struggle with production duties (caused by his addiction to sleeping pills). However, according to Richard Carpenter, "not one major producer would sign on; radio was not quite as friendly at that time to our type of sound and to be honest, my track record on the whole was a tough act to follow. Accordingly, I remained producer, but I did try to approach this new project from a different angle, hence my selection of songs for this album made Passage a bit of a departure from our previous recordings."

Richard Carpenter recalled that "Don't Cry for Me Argentina" was "submitted to us by the publisher, and I immediately felt it was perfect for Karen, though now I feel differently, as I believe the song doesn't linger long enough in a lower register, a great area for Karen's voice. We contacted England's late, great Peter Knight to orchestrate the song, and two others on Passage. Peter flew to Los Angeles to conduct the Los Angeles Philharmonic for the recording. (Due to a contractual agreement their name was not allowed in the credits; the original credits list the "Overbudget Philharmonic"). Between the 100-plus member "Phil" and the 50-voice Gregg Smith Singers, the recording session had to take place on the A&M Sound Stage and was then wired into Studio D."

== Reception ==
Professional ratings
Review scores
Source	Rating
AllMusic	2/5 stars
MusicHound Lounge	2.5/5 stars
The Rolling Stone Album Guide	2/5 stars

The Los Angeles Times called the album "crisp, punchy and often fun," and noted "the sparkle in Richard Carpenter's arrangements and the ambitiousness of the pair's efforts."

Billboard noted "from the opening cut to the final track, this album represents the Carpenters' most boldly innovative and sophisticated undertaking yet...Karen Carpenter's textured vocals, evoking new heights of expressiveness, remains flexible and strong throughout while Richard's keyboards and impeccable production adds a polished refinement. This LP will garner new fans."

Cashbox noted that "surely, this is a milestone Carpenters album. Where the sibling duo was once content with lushly arranged pop ballads with mass appeal, they have embarked this time on a well-charted course that takes them through a calypso boogie, an operatic and symphonic opus, a Latin-tinged number exploring the master/servant dilemma and an other-worldly tune exploring the theme of intergalatic harmony. A breathless ride on the gossamer wings of Karen's magic-carpet vocals with Richard's steady navigation through new and familiar territory."

AllMusic has retrospectively described the Carpenters' effort as "surprisingly ambitious, almost experimental by the standards of the Carpenters" adding that the record was "admirable even if most of the results aren't memorable or essential." However, "All You Get from Love Is a Love Song" was described as, "much more memorable...had more of a beat than one was accustomed to in the duo's music."

== Track listing ==
Side 1
No.	Title	Writer(s)	Length
1.	"B'wana She No Home"	Michael Franks	5:36
2.	"All You Get from Love Is a Love Song"	Steve Eaton	3:47
3.	"I Just Fall in Love Again"	Steve Dorff, Larry Herbstritt, Harry Lloyd, Gloria Sklerov	4:05
4.	"On the Balcony of the Casa Rosada/Don't Cry for Me Argentina"	Andrew Lloyd Webber, Tim Rice	8:13

Side 2
No.	Title	Writer(s)	Length
5.	"Sweet, Sweet Smile"	Juice Newton, Otha Young	3:02
6.	"Two Sides"	Scott E. Davis	3:28
7.	"Man Smart, Woman Smarter"	Norman Span	4:22
8.	"Calling Occupants of Interplanetary Craft"	Terry Draper, John Woloschuk	7:06

== Personnel ==
- Karen Carpenter: lead vocals, backing vocals (2)
- Richard Carpenter: electric & acoustic piano (2, 3, 6, 8), tack piano (7), synthesizer (8), hammond organ (8), backing vocals (2)
- Pete Jolly: piano (1)
- Larry Muhoberac: electric piano (1)
- Tony Peluso: electric guitar (1–3, 5–8), acoustic guitar (5), DJ (8)
- Ray Parker Jr.: electric guitar (2)
- Lee Ritenour: acoustic guitar (6)
- Jay Graydon: acoustic guitar (6)
- Jay Dee Maness: pedal steel guitar (6)
- Joe Osborn: bass (1–3, 5–8)
- Ron Tutt: drums (1, 3, 5, 8)
- Ed Greene: drums (2, 6, 7)
- Wally Snow: percussion (1)
- Tommy Vig: percussion (1, 7), conga (2)
- Jerry Steinholtz: conga (1), percussion (2)
- King Errisson: conga (7)
- Gene Puerling: vocal arrangements (1)
- Julia Tillman, Carlena Williams, Maxine Willard: background vocals (2)
- Gregg Smith Singers: vocals (3, 4, 8)
- Bobby Bruce: fiddle (5)
- Larry McNealy: banjo (5)
- Tom Hensley: tack piano (5, 7)
- Earle Dumler: oboe (3, 8)
- Gale Levant: harp (3)
- Tom Scott: tenor sax (1 & 2), alto flute (1)
- Jackie Kelso: tenor sax (7)
- David Luell & Kurt McGettrick: baritone saxophone (7)
- Peter Knight, Gregg Smith: conductor (3, 4, 8)
- Overbudget Philharmonic: Orchestra (3, 4, 8)
- William Feuerstein: voice of Juan Domingo Peron (4)
- Jonathan Marks: voice of Che, Evita's cynical narrator (4)

== Singles ==
- "All You Get from Love Is a Love Song" (US Hot 100 #35, US Adult Contemporary #4) US 7" single (1977) – A&M 1940
1. "All You Get from Love Is a Love Song"
2. "I Have You"
- "Calling Occupants of Interplanetary Craft" (The Recognized Anthem of World Contact Day) (US Hot 100 #32, US Adult Contemporary #18) US 7" single (1977) – A&M 1978
1. "Calling Occupants of Interplanetary Craft" (The Recognized Anthem of World Contact Day)
2. "Can't Smile without You"
- "Sweet, Sweet Smile" (US Hot 100 #44, US Adult Contemporary #7, US Country #6) US 7" single (1978) – A&M 2008
1. "Sweet, Sweet Smile"
2. "I Have You"
- "Don't Cry for Me Argentina" CA 7" single (1978) – A&M 8629
1. "Don't Cry for Me Argentina"
2. "Calling Occupants of Interplanetary Craft" (The Recognized Anthem of World Contact Day)

== Charts ==
Chart (1977)	Peak position
Argentina Album Charts	8
Australian Albums (Kent Music Report)	48
Canada Top Albums/CDs (RPM)	57
Japanese Albums (Oricon)	7
UK Albums (Official Charts)	12
US Billboard 200	49
US Cash Box Top 200 Albums	53

== Certifications ==
Region	Certification	Certified units/sales
United Kingdom (BPI)	Gold	100,000^{^}
^{^} Shipments figures based on certification alone.
