= Voice of the Heart (album) =

Studio album by the Carpenters
- Released: October 18, 1983
- Recorded: 1976–1983
- Studios: A&M (Los Angeles); Capitol (Hollywood)
- Genre: Pop
- Length: 40:24
- Label: A&M
- Producer: Richard Carpenter

The Carpenters chronology
Made in America (1981)	Voice of the Heart (1983)	An Old-Fashioned Christmas (1984)

Singles from Voice of the Heart
- 1. "Make Believe It's Your First Time" Released: 1983; 2. "Your Baby Doesn't Love You Anymore" Released: 1984

Professional ratings
Review scores
Source	Rating
AllMusic	3/5 stars
The Rolling Stone Album Guide	1/5 stars

Voice of the Heart is the eleventh studio album by American music duo the Carpenters, released on October 18, 1983. Assembled from various studio outtakes, it was the duo's first album of new material following Karen's death on February 4 of that year.

== Background ==
The album contains the two songs from Karen's final recording sessions, "Now" and "You're Enough", from April 1982 while Karen was taking a break from medical treatment in New York and had temporarily returned to California.

Other songs on the record are previously unreleased tracks from sessions of the Carpenters' previous albums A Kind of Hush, Passage and Made in America.

The song "Now" was a cover of the song "Heart to Heart" by Japanese singer Mariya Takeuchi, which appeared on her album Miss M. [2]

The song "Ordinary Fool" was originally recorded during A Kind of Hush sessions.

The songs "Make Believe It's Your First Time" and "Your Baby Doesn't Love You Anymore" were recorded during sessions for the Carpenters' previous studio album, Made in America, and the former eventually became a lead single for Voice of the Heart.

== Reception ==
Billboard called it "the duo's strongest album in a decade and contains a few cuts that rank with their all-time best. The most radio-worthy are "Two Lives," a rock-edged ballad previously recorded by Bonnie Raitt; "Your Baby Doesn't Love You Anymore," a brooding, slow-boil pop piece in the tradition of "Hurt So Bad," and "Make Believe It's Your First Time," the soft reflective ballad which is the first single. But the most gripping cut is "Ordinary Fool," a Paul Williams ballad which features the bluesiest vocal of Karen's career."

In their review, Cashbox noted that "this LP will probably be the last and most remembered collection of new songs by the brother and sister duo. One cannot help feel sad about the void she has left, but the songs featured on this LP are some of the best the duo has recorded in some time and the uplifting messages in their lyrics demand that “Voice of the Heart” be taken as a message of happiness and optimism. This is a fond farewell from a great singer who will be long appreciated for her inspirational and strong love for the music she sang."

== Track listing ==
Side one
No.	Title	Writer(s)	Length
1.	"Now"	Roger Nichols; Dean Pitchford	3:51
2.	"Sailing on the Tide"	John Bettis; Tony Peluso	4:24
3.	"You're Enough"	Bettis; Richard Carpenter	3:48
4.	"Make Believe It's Your First Time"	Bob Morrison; Johnny Wilson	4:08
5.	"Two Lives"	Mark T. Jordan	4:35

Side two
No.	Title	Writer(s)	Length
6.	"At the End of a Song"	Bettis; Carpenter	3:40
7.	"Ordinary Fool"	Paul Williams	3:42
8.	"Prime Time Love"	Danny Ironstone; Mary Unobsky	3:12
9.	"Your Baby Doesn't Love You Anymore"	Larry Weiss	3:51
10.	"Look to Your Dreams"	Bettis; Carpenter	5:13

== Personnel ==
- Vocals: Karen Carpenter
- Guitar: Dennis Budimir, Tim May, Tony Peluso, Fred Tackett. Steel Pedal: JayDee Maness
- Bass: Chuck Domanico, Joe Osborn
- Keyboards: Richard Carpenter
- Drums: Ed Greene, Larrie Londin, Ron Tutt
- Percussion: Paulinho DaCosta, Peter Limonick
- Saxophone: John Phillips, Tom Scott
- Oboe, English Horn: Earl Dumler
- Flute: Tom Scott, Sheridon Stokes
- Horns: John Audino, Chuck Findley, Ron Gorow
- Harp: Gayle Levant
- Backing Vocals: Richard Carpenter, The O.K. Chorale

== Charts ==
Chart (1983–1984)	Peak position
Australian Albums (Kent Music Report)	54
Japanese Albums (Oricon)	41
UK Albums (Official Charts)	6
US Billboard 200	46
US Cash Box Top 200 Albums	38

== Certifications ==
Region	Certification	Certified units/sales
United Kingdom (BPI)	Gold	100,000^{^}
United States (RIAA)	Gold	500,000^{^}
^{^} Shipments figures based on certification alone.
