= Karen Carpenter =

American singer and drummer (1950–1983)

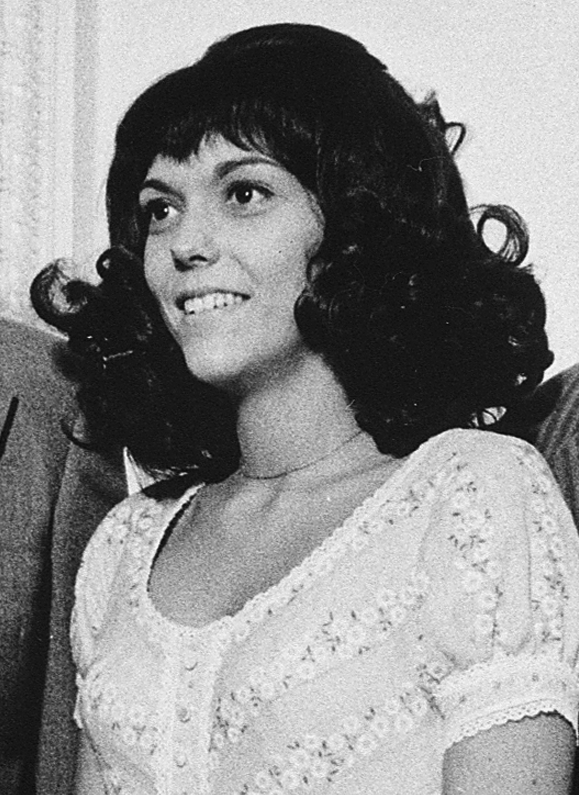
- Carpenter in 1972

Background information
- Born: Karen Anne Carpenter; March 2, 1950; New Haven, Connecticut, U.S.
- Origin: Downey, California, U.S.
- Died: February 4, 1983 (aged 32) Downey, California, U.S.
- Cause of death: Heart failure from anorexia nervosa
- Genres: Pop; easy listening; soft rock; jazz
- Occupation: Musician
- Instruments: Vocals; drums
- Years active: 1965–1983
- Label: A&M
- Formerly of: The Carpenters; The Richard Carpenter Trio; Spectrum
- Spouse: Thomas Burris (m. 1980; sep. 1981)
- Website: richardandkarencarpenter.com

Karen Anne Carpenter (March 2, 1950 – February 4, 1983) was an American musician who was the lead vocalist and drummer of the musical duo the Carpenters, formed with her older brother Richard. With a distinctive three-octave contralto range, Carpenter was praised by her peers for her vocal skills. She appeared on Rolling Stone's 2010 list of the 100 greatest singers of all time.

Carpenter was born in New Haven, Connecticut, and moved to Downey, California, in 1963 with her family. She began to study the drums in high school and joined the Long Beach State choir in college. After several years touring and recording, the Carpenters were signed to A&M Records in 1969, when Karen was 19 years old. They achieved enormous commercial and critical success throughout the 1970s. Initially, Carpenter was the band's full-time drummer, but she gradually took the role of frontwoman as her drumming was reduced to a handful of live showcases or tracks on albums.

In 1975, Carpenter started exhibiting symptoms of anorexia nervosa due to the severe pressures of fame and her complicated family dynamics. Carpenter never recovered and died a month before her 33rd birthday in 1983 from complications related to her disorder, which was little known outside celebrity circles at the time. Carpenter's death sparked worldwide attention and research into eating disorders and body dysmorphia. Interest in her life and death has produced numerous documentaries and films.

== Early life ==
Karen Anne Carpenter was born on March 2, 1950, at Grace New Haven Hospital (now called Yale New Haven Hospital) in New Haven, Connecticut, the daughter of Agnes Reuwer (March 5, 1915 – November 10, 1996) and Harold Bertram Carpenter (November 8, 1908 – October 15, 1988). Harold was born in Wuzhou, China, where his parents were missionaries. Before finding work in the printing business, Harold was educated at boarding schools in the United Kingdom.

Carpenter's older brother, Richard, developed an interest in music at an early age, becoming a piano prodigy. Karen's first words were "bye-bye" and "stop it", the latter spoken in response to Richard. She enjoyed dancing and by age four was enrolled in tap dancing and ballet classes. Later, Karen liked to play softball in the street.

In June 1963, the family moved to the Los Angeles suburb of Downey, after Harold was offered a job there by a former business associate. In 1964, Carpenter entered Downey High School at age 14 and was a year younger than her classmates. She joined the school marching band, initially to avoid exercising for gym classes. Bruce Gifford, the conductor, who had previously taught her brother, gave Carpenter the glockenspiel, an instrument she disliked. After admiring the drumming performance of her friend and classmate, Frankie Chavez, who had been playing from an early age and idolized the jazz drummer Buddy Rich, Carpenter asked if she could play drums instead.

Carpenter wanted a Ludwig drum set, because it was used by her favorite drummers, Joe Morello and Ringo Starr. Chavez persuaded Carpenter's family to buy her a $300 (the equivalent of $3,100 in 2025) Ludwig kit, and he began to show her how to play. Carpenter's enthusiasm for drumming led her to teach herself how to play complicated lines and to study stick control, drum styles, playing technique, and grips like traditional and matched grip. She was talented, rehearsed every day, and within a year could play in complex time signatures, such as the 5/4 signature in Dave Brubeck's "Take Five". Carpenter began to study drum technique with Bill Douglass, a respected jazz drummer with Benny Goodman and Art Tatum, and soon acquired a professional drum kit.

Carpenter was initially nervous about performing in public, but said she "was too involved in the music to worry about it". In early 1967, Carpenter graduated from Downey High School, receiving the John Philip Sousa Band Award. She enrolled as a music major at Long Beach State, where she performed in the college choir with Richard. Karen became more confident in singing and began to take lessons with Frank Pooler, the choir's director. She worked with him to develop her upper register so she would have a full three-octave range, and he taught Carpenter a mixture of classical and pop singing. Pooler later said "Karen was a born pop singer". By age 17, her voice "was a remarkable instrument".

== Career ==
=== Early years ===
The first public performance of Karen and Richard Carpenter was in a local production of Frank Loesser's musical Guys and Dolls. Carpenter's first band was Two Plus Two, an all-girl trio formed with friends from Downey High. They split up after one of the mothers refused to give her daughter permission to attend their first gig. In 1965, Karen, Richard, and his college friend Wes Jacobs, a bassist and tuba player, formed the Dick Carpenter Trio. The band rehearsed daily and played jazz in nightclubs. Richard later said that he was impressed with his sister's musical talent, adding that she would "speedily maneuver the sticks as if she had been born in a drum factory". Karen did not sing at this point; instead, the singer Margaret Shanor guested on some numbers. The trio signed a contract with RCA Records and recorded two instrumentals, but they were not released.

In April 1966, the Carpenters were invited to audition at a session with the bassist Joe Osborn, well known for being part of the studio-musician collective the Wrecking Crew. Though she was initially expected just to be the drummer, Karen tried singing and impressed everyone there with her distinctive voice. Osborn signed a recording contract with her for his label, Magic Lamp Records; he was not particularly interested in Richard's involvement.

In 1967, Jacobs left the trio to study at the Juilliard School, and the Carpenter siblings were keen to try out other musical styles. Along with other musicians, including Gary Sims and John Bettis, the siblings formed the group Spectrum, which focused on a harmonious vocal sound and recorded many demo tapes in Osborn's garage studio, working out how to overdub voices onto multitrack tape. Many of those tapes were rejected by record companies. The group had difficulty attracting a live following, as their sound was too dissimilar from the hard rock and psychedelic rock then popular in clubs. (Note: The tapes of the original sessions were lost in a fire at Joe Osborn's house and the surviving versions of those early songs exist only as fragile acetate reference discs.)

In 1968, the Dick Carpenter Trio also appeared on the TV talent show Your All American College Show, performing "Dancing in the Street" with Carpenter playing the drums and singing. The Trio won the finals that year.

=== Carpenters ===
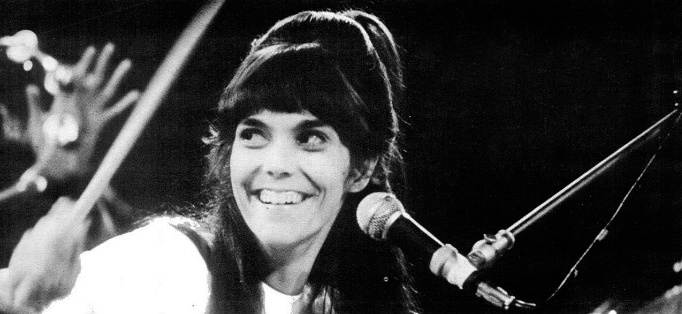
Karen Carpenter drumming on stage, early 1970s

A&M Records signed the Carpenters to a recording contract in 1969. Karen started as both the group's drummer and co-lead singer, and originally sang all her vocals from behind the drum set. She sang most of the songs on the band's first album, Offering (later retitled Ticket to Ride); Richard wrote ten of the thirteen songs and sang on five of them. The opening and concluding tracks were sung by both in unison. Karen also played bass guitar on "All of My Life" and "Eve", under Osborn's guidance. (Note: Although Karen's bass playing is heard on the original album, Richard remixed both songs (as he has done with almost every Carpenters song), and Joe Osborn's bass playing was substituted on later "greatest hits" releases.)

On "All I Can Do", Karen played in 5/4 time, while "Your Wonderful Parade" featured multiple snare and bass drum overdubs to emulate the sound of a marching band. The track "Ticket to Ride", a Beatles song that later became the album's title track, was released as the Carpenters' first single; it reached No. 54 on the Billboard Hot 100. Their next album, 1970's Close to You, featured two hit singles: "(They Long to Be) Close to You" and "We've Only Just Begun." They peaked at No. 1 and No. 2, respectively, on the Hot 100.

Because she was just 5 feet 4 inches (1.63 m) tall, it was difficult for people in the audience to see Karen behind her kit. After reviews complained that the group had no focal point in live shows, Richard and the group's manager, Sherwin Bash, persuaded her to stand at the microphone to sing the band's hits while another musician played the drums. The former Disney Mouseketeer Cubby O'Brien served as the band's other drummer for many years. Karen initially struggled in live performances singing solo, as she felt more secure behind the drum kit.

After the release of Now & Then in 1973, the albums tended to have Carpenter singing more and drumming less, and she became the focal point of all records and live performances. Bash said that "she was the one that people watched." Carpenter became known to some fans as "Lead Sister" because of a mispronunciation of "lead singer" by a Japanese journalist in 1974 and later wore a T-shirt with the nickname during live shows. Starting with the Carpenters' 1976 concert tour and continuing thereafter, she performed a showcase in which she moved around the stage playing various configurations of drums. Carpenter's studio performances benefited from close miking that captured the nuances of her voice well. Though she had a three-octave range, many of the duo's hits prominently feature Karen's lower contralto singing, leading her to quip, "The money's in the basement."

Carpenter always considered herself a "drummer who sang". She preferred Ludwig Drums, including the Ludwig SuperSensitive snare, which she favored greatly. However, Carpenter did not drum on every Carpenters recording. She was the only featured drummer on Ticket to Ride and Now & Then, except on "Jambalaya." According to the session drummer Hal Blaine, Karen played on many of the Carpenters' album cuts and he played on most of the studio sessions when she did not play drums. Karen was informed about Blaine's involvement and approved on the basis that she and Richard wanted hit singles.

The duo was happy for Blaine to take the role in the studio, as he was a respected session musician and it was easier to record Carpenter's guide vocal without its spilling onto the drum mics. Blaine praised Karen's drumming skills but believed her greatest strength was as a vocalist and thought himself more adept at working in a recording studio, which required a different approach from that of an onstage performance. On Made in America, Karen provided percussion on "Those Good Old Dreams" in tandem with Paulinho da Costa, and played drums on the song "When It's Gone (It's Just Gone)" in unison with Larrie Londin.

In the mid-1970s, Richard Carpenter developed an addiction to Quaaludes. The Carpenters frequently canceled tour dates and stopped touring altogether after their September 4, 1978, concert at the MGM Grand in Las Vegas. In 1980, Karen performed a medley of standards in a duet with Ella Fitzgerald on the Carpenters' television program Music, Music, Music. The following year, after the release of the Made in America album, which was their last, the Carpenters returned to the stage and went on some promotional tours, including an appearance for the BBC program Nationwide.

"Now" was the last song Carpenter recorded, in April 1982. Though Richard was concerned about her health, he still thought Karen's voice sounded as good as ever.

=== Solo ===
In 1967, Carpenter released her first solo record, "Looking for Love" / "I'll Be Yours," on Osborn's Magic Lamp label. Only 500 copies were pressed, and the label folded shortly afterwards. In 1979, while Richard took a year off to treat his addiction, Karen started recording in New York for a solo album with the producer Phil Ramone. The sessions produced music that was different from the usual Carpenters material, tending more toward disco and up-tempo numbers with more mature lyrics, and taking full advantage of Karen's upper vocal register.

The album met with a tepid response from Richard and A&M executives in early 1980 and was shelved by the A&M Records co-owner Herb Alpert, in spite of attempts by the producer Quincy Jones to convince him to release the solo record after a remix. A&M charged Carpenter $400,000 to cover the cost of recording her unreleased album, to be paid out of the duo's future royalties.

In 1989, six years after Karen Carpenter's death, a portion of the solo album was commercially released when Richard's remixes of some of its tracks were included on the album Lovelines, the final album of previously unreleased material from the Carpenters. In 1996, the complete solo album, titled Karen Carpenter, was released as originally intended. Rob Hoerburger wrote in The New York Times that it may not have been the album to define Carpenter's career, "but it holds up with anything that like-minded singers—Streisand, Newton-John—were recording at the time".

== Personal life ==
Carpenter had a complicated relationship with her parents. The family moved to Los Angeles from Connecticut for Richard to enter the music business, but was unaware of Karen's musical talent. She continued to live with them until 1974. Two years later, Carpenter bought two Century City apartments that she combined into one, and the doorbell chimed the opening notes of "We've Only Just Begun." Carpenter collected Disney memorabilia and liked to play softball and baseball. As a child, she had played baseball with other children on the street and was selected before her brother for games. Carpenter studied baseball statistics carefully and became a fan of the New York Yankees. In the early 1970s, she became the pitcher on a celebrity all-star softball team.

Carpenter's celebrity friends included Petula Clark, Olivia Newton-John, and Dionne Warwick. While she was enjoying success as a female drummer in what was primarily an all-male occupation, Carpenter's ideas were not in line with the women's liberation movement, and she felt that a wife should cook for her husband because men were unskilled at cooking and that she planned to do so when she got married. Still, in early interviews, Carpenter showed no interest in marriage or dating. She believed that a relationship would not survive constant touring, adding "as long as we're on the road most of the time, I will never marry." In 1976, Carpenter said that the music business created difficulty in meeting people and that she refused to wed simply for the sake of being married. Carpenter admitted to Newton-John that she longed for a happy marriage and family. Carpenter later dated several notable men, including Mike Curb, Tony Danza, Terry Ellis, Tom Bahler, Mark Harmon, Steve Martin, Alan Osmond, and Bill Hudson.

After a whirlwind romance, Carpenter married real-estate developer Thomas James Burris on August 31, 1980, in the Crystal Room of the Beverly Hills Hotel. Burris, divorced with an 18-year-old son, was nine years her senior. A few days prior to the ceremony, Carpenter was taped singing a new song, "Because We Are in Love," and the tape was played for guests during the wedding ceremony. The song, written by her brother and John Bettis, was released in 1981. The couple settled in Newport Beach.

Carpenter wanted children, but Burris had undergone a vasectomy, which he refused to reverse, leading to a collapse in the marriage. According to Carpenter's friend, singer Karen Kamon, the marriage was "the straw that broke the camel's back. It was absolutely the worst thing that could have ever happened to her." In September 1981, Carpenter revised her will and left her marital home and its contents to Burris, but left everything else to her brother and parents, a fortune estimated at between $5 million and $10 million ($15 million and $30 million in 2025). Two months later, following an argument after a family dinner in a restaurant, Carpenter and Burris separated. Carpenter filed for divorce on October 28, 1982, while she was a patient at Lenox Hill Hospital.

== Health and death ==
Carpenter began dieting while in high school. Under a doctor's guidance, she began the Stillman diet, eating lean proteins, drinking eight glasses of water a day and avoiding fatty foods and carbohydrates. Carpenter reduced her weight to 120 pounds (54 kg) and stayed approximately at that weight until around 1973, when the Carpenters' career reached its peak. That year, she saw a concert photo of herself and felt that her clothing made her appear heavy. Carpenter hired a personal trainer, who advised her to change her diet. The new diet built muscle, which made her feel heavier instead of slimmer. Carpenter fired the trainer and began her own program using exercise equipment and calorie counting. She lost about 20 pounds (9 kg) and intended to lose another 5 pounds (2.3 kg). Carpenter's eating habits also changed as she would try to remove food from her plate by offering tastes to others with whom she was dining.

By September 1975, Carpenter weighed 91 pounds (41 kg). At live performances, fans reacted with gasps to her gaunt appearance, and many wrote to the pair to ask what was wrong. Carpenter refused to declare publicly that she was suffering from an eating disorder. In a 1981 Nationwide TV interview, when asked about having anorexia nervosa, Carpenter simply said she was "pooped". However, Carpenter and those around her knew that something was wrong. Dionne Warwick wrote that she was shocked at how thin Carpenter was when they met for lunch in New York in 1981.

In 1981, Karen told Richard that she needed help. She spoke with Cherry Boone, who had recovered from anorexia nervosa, and contacted Boone's doctor for help. Carpenter was hoping to find a quick solution, as she had performing and recording obligations, but the doctor told her that treatment could last from one to three years. Carpenter chose to be treated in New York City by the psychotherapist Steven Levenkron.

By late 1981, Carpenter was taking thyroid-replacement medication, which she obtained using the name of Karen Burris, to increase her metabolism. Carpenter used the medication in conjunction with increased consumption (as many as 90 tablets per night) of the laxatives upon which she had long relied. Despite Levenkron's treatment, including confiscation of medications that Carpenter had misused, her condition continued to deteriorate, and she lost more weight, eventually reaching an adult low of 77 pounds (35 kg). Carpenter told Levenkron that she felt dizzy and that her heart was beating irregularly.

In September 1982, Carpenter was admitted to Lenox Hill Hospital in New York, where she was placed on parenteral nutrition. The procedure was successful, and Carpenter gained 30 pounds (14 kg) in a relatively short time, but this strained her heart, which was already weak from years of anorexia. Carpenter maintained a relatively stable weight for the rest of her life.

In November 1982, Carpenter returned to California, determined to reinvigorate her career, finalize her divorce, and begin a new album with Richard. On December 17, Carpenter performed in public for the last time as she sang Christmas carols for her godchildren, their classmates, and other friends at the Buckley School in Sherman Oaks, California. Her last public appearance was on January 11, 1983, at a gathering of past Grammy Award winners who were commemorating the 25th anniversary of the Grammys. Carpenter appeared frail and fatigued, but according to Dionne Warwick, was vibrant and outgoing, exclaiming, "Look at me! I've got an ass!" She also began to write songs for the first time after returning to California, and told Warwick that she had "a lot of living left to do".

On February 1, 1983, Carpenter saw Richard for the last time and discussed plans for the group, including touring. (Note: Richard spoke to his sister the day before her death. Karen called him to ask his opinion about a new videocassette recorder she planned on buying. He described her as sounding "absolutely fine".) Three days later, Carpenter was scheduled to sign papers to finalize her divorce. However, shortly after waking up that morning, she collapsed on the floor of a walk-in closet at her parents' home in Downey. Paramedics found Carpenter unconscious and severely bradycardic, with her heart beating once every 10 seconds (6 bpm). Carpenter was rushed by ambulance to Downey Community Hospital, where she was pronounced dead at 9:51 am, at the age of 32.

Carpenter's funeral was held on February 8, 1983, at Downey United Methodist Church. Approximately 1,000 mourners attended, including her friends Dionne Warwick, Dorothy Hamill, Olivia Newton-John, and Petula Clark. Burris placed his wedding ring into her casket. Carpenter was buried at Forest Lawn Memorial Park in Cypress, California. In December 2003, her body was moved, along with those of her parents, to a private mausoleum at the Pierce Brothers Valley Oaks Memorial Park in Westlake Village, California.

An autopsy released on March 11, 1983, discounted drug overdose, attributing Carpenter's death to "emetine cardiotoxicity due to or as a consequence of anorexia nervosa". Her blood sugar level at the time of death was 1,110 milligrams per deciliter (61.6 mmol/L), more than 10 times the average. Two years later, the coroner told colleagues that Carpenter's heart failure was caused by repeated use of ipecac syrup, an over-the-counter drug often used to induce vomiting in cases of overdosing or poisoning. (Note: Ipecac syrup is no longer marketed in the United States as an OTC emetic.) This was disputed by Levenkron, who said that he had never known her to use ipecac and that he had not seen evidence that she had been vomiting. Carpenter's friends were convinced that she had abused laxatives and thyroid medication to maintain her weight and felt that the problem had begun after her marriage began to fail.

== Legacy ==
"This is a sad day, but at the same time a very special and beautiful day to my family and me. My only regret is that Karen is not physically here to share it with us, but I know that she is very much alive in our minds, and in our hearts."

— Richard Carpenter speaking at the Hollywood Walk of Fame, 1983

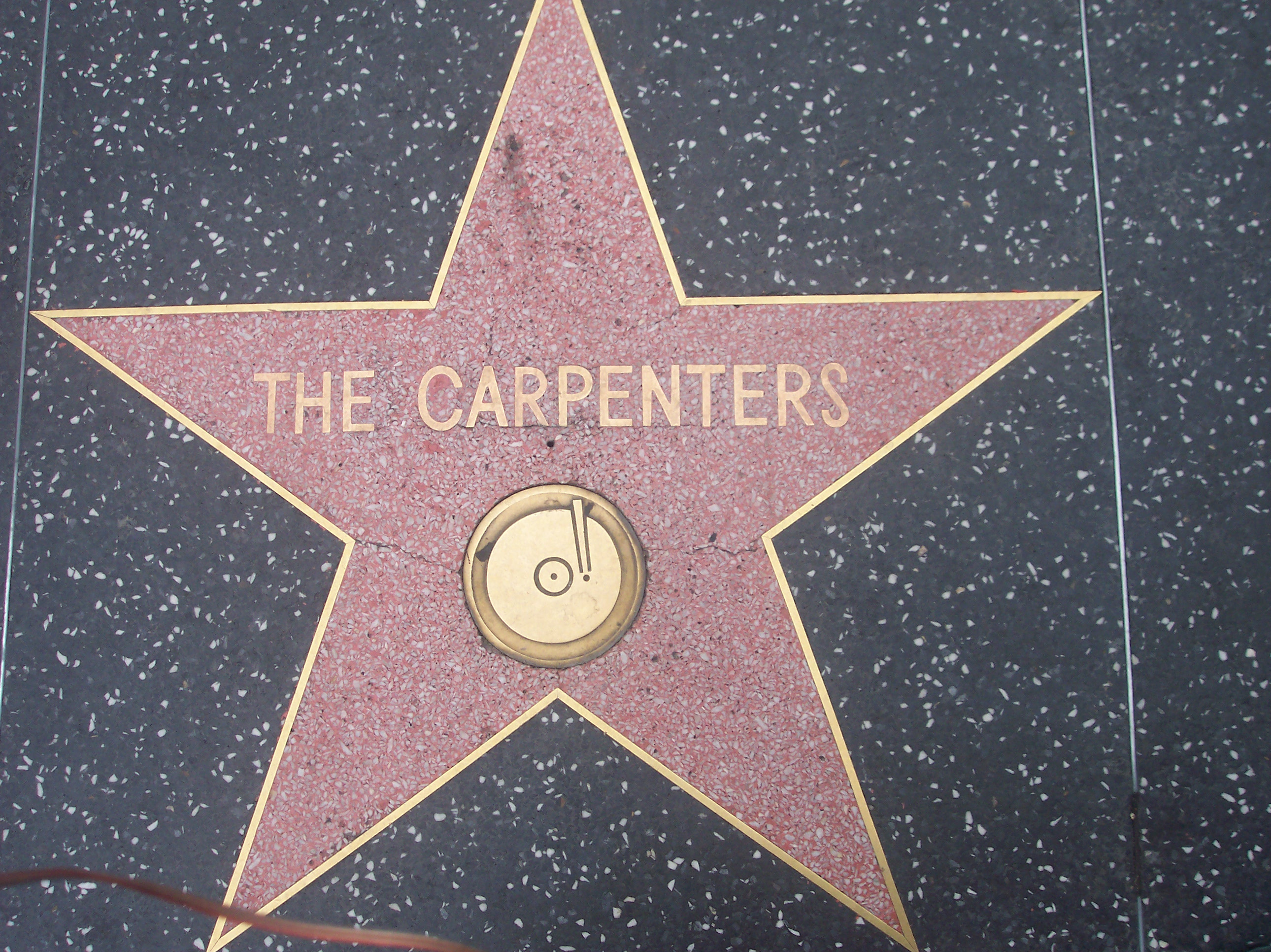
The Carpenters' star at the Hollywood Walk of Fame

Reacting to Carpenter's death, the songwriter Burt Bacharach said that she "had a sound in her voice that was very unique, that I haven't heard before". Carpenter's singing has attracted critical praise and influenced many significant musicians and singers, including Madonna, Sheryl Crow, Pat Metheny, Sonic Youth's Kim Gordon, Shania Twain, Natalie Imbruglia, k.d. lang, The Bangles, Debbie Gibson, Taylor Swift, Beyoncé, Gloria Estefan, Mandy Moore, Adele, Alison Krauss, Clairo, The Corrs, Rumer, Norah Jones, Linda Perry, Michael Jackson, LeAnn Rimes, Christina Aguilera, Lea Salonga, Gwen Stefani, Lana Del Rey, Leona Lewis, Lady Gaga, The Civil Wars, Alicia Keys, Chappell Roan, and Sabrina Carpenter, and even Japanese singers like Anri, Mariya Takeuchi and Akiko Kobayashi. Paul McCartney has said that Carpenter had "the best female voice in the world: melodic, tuneful and distinctive," and Elton John has called her "one of the greatest voices of our lifetime."

In the BBC documentary Only Yesterday: The Carpenters Story, Carpenter's friend Nicky Chinn said that John Lennon walked up to her at a Los Angeles restaurant and told her: "I want to tell you, love, that you've got a fabulous voice." Her drumming has been praised by her fellow musicians Hal Blaine, Cubby O'Brien, and Buddy Rich, and by Modern Drummer magazine. Carpenter appeared in the drummer rankings of every Playboy annual music poll from 1974 to 1980; Playboy's readers voted her the tenth best drummer in 1975 and the tenth best pop/rock drummer the following year.

On October 12, 1983, eight months after her death, the Carpenters received a star on the Hollywood Walk of Fame. In 1999, VH1 ranked Carpenter at No. 29 on its list of the 100 Greatest Women of Rock and Roll. In 2010, Rolling Stone ranked Carpenter No. 94 on its list of the 100 Greatest Singers of All Time, calling her voice "impossibly lush and almost shockingly intimate," adding "even the sappiest songs sound like she was staring directly into your eyes."

Carpenter's death brought media attention to anorexia nervosa; the condition had not been widely known beforehand. Her family started the Karen A. Carpenter Memorial Foundation, which raised money for research on anorexia nervosa and other eating disorders.

In 1994, the Richard and Karen Carpenter Performing Arts Center opened, located next to the music department at the California State University, Long Beach; Karen and Richard were both students at the university and donors to it. Taking its design from the New York State Theater of the Arts at Lincoln Center, it is a more than 1,000-seat venue that hosts a variety of events such as music, theater, films, and forums.

== Biographies ==
In 1987, a 43-minute film titled Superstar: The Karen Carpenter Story, directed by Todd Haynes, was released, and featured Barbie dolls as the characters. It was withdrawn from circulation in 1990 after Haynes lost a copyright infringement lawsuit filed by Richard Carpenter. The film's title is derived from the Carpenters' 1971 hit song "Superstar." Over the years, it has developed into a cult film and been included in Entertainment Weekly's 2003 list of the top 50 cult movies.

On January 1, 1989, the similarly titled made-for-TV movie The Karen Carpenter Story aired on CBS with Cynthia Gibb in the title role. Gibb lip-synched the songs to Carpenter's recorded voice, with the exception of "The End of the World." Both films use the song "This Masquerade" in the background while showing Carpenter's marriage to Burris. The movie helped revive the Carpenters' critical standing and increased their music's popularity.

Richard Carpenter helped in the production of the documentaries Close to You: Remembering The Carpenters (1997) and Only Yesterday: The Carpenters Story (2007).

Randy Schmidt wrote a biography of Carpenter, Little Girl Blue, published in 2010, which included a foreword by Dionne Warwick. It was based on interviews with other friends and associates and provides a different perspective from those of the other officially endorsed biographies. The New York Times called the book "one of the saddest tales in pop."

In 2021, long-time Carpenters historian Chris May and Associated Press entertainment journalist Mike Cidoni Lennox published Carpenters: The Musical Legacy, based on interviews with Richard Carpenter. It features rare photographs and newly revealed stories behind the making of the albums. Goldmine said the book "provided a candid and detailed look at much of what went into the Carpenters' sound as well as Richard's personal thoughts on the music business today."

== Discography ==
=== Studio albums ===
| Year | Title | Notes |
|---|---|---|
| 1996 | Karen Carpenter | Released: October 8, 1996; Label: A&M; Formats: Cassette, CD, digital download |

=== Singles ===
| Year | Single | Chart position | Album |
| Year | Single | US AC | Album |
|---|---|---|---|
| 1966 | "Looking for Love" | — | Non-album single |
| 1989 | "If I Had You" | 18 | Lovelines (Carpenters) |
| 1996 | "Make Believe It's Your First Time" | — | Karen Carpenter |

=== With Carpenters ===
==== Studio albums ====
- Offering (later reissued as Ticket to Ride) (1969)
- Close to You (1970)
- Carpenters (1971)
- A Song for You (1972)
- Now & Then (1973)
- Horizon (1975)
- A Kind of Hush (1976)
- Passage (1977)
- Christmas Portrait (1978)
- Made in America (1981)
- Voice of the Heart (1983)
- An Old-Fashioned Christmas (1984)
- Lovelines (1989)

== Movies and documentaries ==
- The Karen Carpenter Story (1989 TV movie), Joseph Sargent
- Karen Carpenter: Starving for Perfection (2023 documentary), AMS Pictures
