= Where Do I Go from Here (England Dan & John Ford Coley song) =

Song by England Dan & John Ford Coley

from the album Dowdy Ferry Road
- Released: 1977
- Genre: Soft rock
- Length: 2:59
- Label: Big Tree
- Songwriter: Parker McGee

"Where Do I Go from Here" is a song written by Parker McGee and first recorded by soft rock duo England Dan & John Ford Coley in 1977 for their album Dowdy Ferry Road.

The following year, Barry Manilow recorded his version which featured on his 1978 album Even Now.

The song was also recorded by the Carpenters and released on the album Lovelines in 1989.
