= Rainy Days and Mondays =

Single by Carpenters

from the album Carpenters
- B-side: "Saturday"
- Released: April 23, 1971
- Recorded: 1971
- Genre: Soft rock; soft pop
- Length: 3:36
- Label: A&M
- Songwriters: Paul Williams; Roger Nichols
- Producer: Jack Daugherty

Carpenters singles chronology
"For All We Know" (1971)	"Rainy Days and Mondays" (1971)	"Superstar" (1971)

Music video
- "Rainy Days and Mondays" on YouTube

"Rainy Days and Mondays" is a song by the Carpenters from their self-titled third album, with instrumental backing by the Wrecking Crew. It was written by Paul Williams (lyrics) and Roger Nichols (music), who had previously written "We've Only Just Begun", another hit for the duo. The B-side on the single is "Saturday", a song written and sung by Richard Carpenter.

A demonstration for the song was initially sent to Richard Carpenter by Williams and Nichols. Upon hearing it, Richard felt that the song was perfect for Karen Carpenter and him to record. The song was recorded a few weeks before Karen’s 21st birthday. Richard wanted to keep the song’s arrangement sparse to showcase her vocal talent.

“Rainy Days and Mondays” peaked at number two on the Billboard Hot 100 chart, spending seven weeks in the top 10, and was kept from number one by "It's Too Late"/"I Feel the Earth Move" by Carole King. It also became Carpenters' fourth consecutive top-five single in the Billboard Hot 100. The song was also the duo's fourth number-one single on the Adult Contemporary singles chart. However, the song failed to chart in the United Kingdom until it went to number 63 in a reissue there in 1993. "Rainy Days and Mondays" was certified gold by the Recording Industry Association of America for 500,000 copies sold in the United States.

== Personnel ==
- Karen Carpenter - lead and backing vocals
- Richard Carpenter - backing vocals, piano, Wurlitzer electric piano, orchestration
- Joe Osborn - bass guitar
- Hal Blaine - drums
- Tommy Morgan - harmonica
- Bob Messenger - tenor saxophone

== Chart performance ==
=== Weekly charts ===
Chart (1971)	Peak position
US Billboard Hot 100	2
US Adult Contemporary (Billboard)	1
US Cash Box Top 100	2
Canada RPM Top Singles	3
Canada RPM Adult Contemporary	1
New Zealand (Listener)	19
Australia	35
Japan (Oricon)	71
Quebec (ADISQ)	3

Chart (1993)	Peak position
United Kingdom	63

=== Year-end charts ===
Chart (1971)	Rank
Australia	122
Canada	42
US Billboard Hot 100	37
US Easy Listening (Billboard)	4
US Cash Box Top 100	33

== Compilations ==
- Yesterday Once More
- From the Top
- Interpretations
- Love Songs
- The Essential Collection
- Carpenters: Gold 35th Anniversary Edition

== See also ==
- List of number-one adult contemporary singles of 1971 (U.S.)
