= The Carpenters discography =

Cataloging of published recordings by The Carpenters

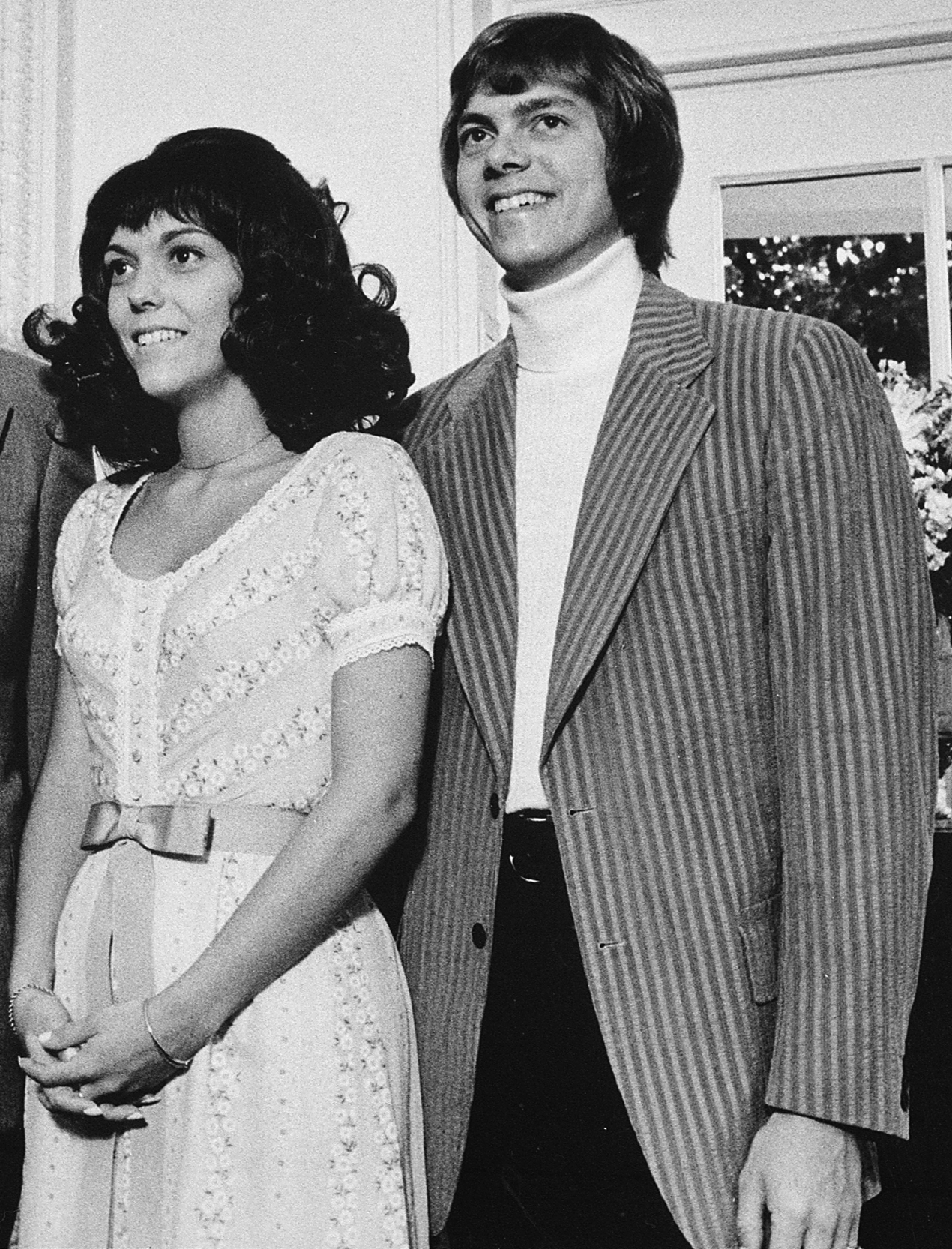
- Karen and Richard Carpenter at the White House on August 1, 1972
- Studio albums: 13
- Live albums: 2
- Compilation albums: 18
- Tribute albums: 1
- Singles: 49
- B-sides: 15
- Video albums: 3

The discography of the American pop group the Carpenters consists of 13 studio albums including 2 Christmas albums, 2 live albums, 49 singles, and numerous compilation albums a number of which were released only on certain territories.

The duo was made up of siblings Karen (lead vocals and drums) and Richard Carpenter (keyboards and vocals). The siblings started their musical career together in the latter half of the 1960s. In October 1969, six months after they signed a contract with A&M Records, the Carpenters released their debut album Offering (its title was later changed to Ticket to Ride). Within a year, they rose to prominence with their chart-topping single "(They Long to Be) Close to You", a Burt Bacharach and Hal David composition that had not been commercially successful when it was recorded by television star Richard Chamberlain in 1963.

The Carpenters garnered worldwide commercial success, scoring big hits mainly in the first half of the 1970s. RIAA-certified sales of their records (albums, singles and videos) have been estimated at around 34.6 million units. In the United Kingdom, they are ranked as the seventh top-selling albums artist on the official record chart of the 1970s. During their career, the duo scored 1 number one album and another 4 Top 10 albums on Billboard 200, as well as 3 number one singles, 12 top 10 singles and 20 top 40 hits on Billboard Hot 100. They have also been the third-best-selling international music act in the Japanese market, only behind Mariah Carey and the Beatles. By 2005, they had reportedly sold more than 100 million copies of records worldwide.

== Albums ==
=== Studio albums ===
Year	Album details	Peak chart positions								Certifications (sales thresholds)
Year	Album details	US	AUS	CAN	GER	JPN	NOR	NZ	UK	Certifications (sales thresholds)
1969	Ticket to Ride (First released under the title Offering): Released: October 9, 1969; Label: A&M; Formats: LP, tape (open reel), cassette, CD, digital download	150	19	—	—	88	—	—	20	
1970	Close to You: Released: August 19, 1970; Label: A&M/Polydor; Formats: LP, tape, cassette, CD, digital download	2	16	1	—	53	—	—	23	RIAA: 2× Platinum
1971	Carpenters: Released: May 14, 1971; Label: A&M; Formats: LP, tape, cassette, CD, digital download	2	16	6	—	47	—	—	12	RIAA: 4× Platinum; BPI: Gold
1972	A Song for You: Released: June 22, 1972; Label: A&M; Formats: LP, tape, cassette, CD, digital download	4	6	5	—	5	—	—	13	RIAA: 3× Platinum
1973	Now & Then: Released: May 1, 1973; Label: A&M; Formats: LP, tape, cassette, CD, digital download	2	3	2	—	1	12	—	2	RIAA: 2× Platinum; BPI: Gold
1975	Horizon: Released: June 6, 1975; Label: A&M; Formats: LP, tape, cassette, CD, digital download	13	21	4	42	1	5	3	1	RIAA: Platinum; BPI: Gold; MC: Gold
1976	A Kind of Hush: Released: June 11, 1976; Label: A&M; Formats: LP, tape, cassette, CD, digital download	33	57	22	—	5	17	15	3	RIAA: Gold; BPI: Gold
1977	Passage: Released: September 23, 1977; Label: A&M; Formats: LP, tape, cassette, 8-track CD, digital download	49	48	57	—	7	—	—	12	BPI: Gold
1978	Christmas Portrait: Released: October 13, 1978; Label: A&M; Formats: LP, cassette, CD, digital download	56	—	74	—	—	—	—	—	RIAA: Platinum; MC: Gold
1981	Made in America: Released: June 16, 1981; Label: A&M; Formats: LP, cassette, CD, digital download	52	50	—	—	44	—	—	12	BPI: Silver
1983	Voice of the Heart: Released: October 18, 1983; Label: A&M; Formats: LP, cassette, CD, digital download	46	54	—	—	41	—	—	6	RIAA: Gold; BPI: Gold
1984	An Old-Fashioned Christmas: Released: 1984; Label: A&M; Formats: LP, cassette, CD, digital download	190	—	—	—	—	—	—	—	RIAA: Gold
1989	Lovelines: Released: October 31, 1989; Label: A&M; Formats: LP, cassette, CD, digital download	—	110	—	—	—	—	—	73	
2001	As Time Goes By: Released: August 1, 2001; Label: A&M; Formats: CD, digital download	—	—	—	18	—	—	—	—	RIAJ: Gold
"—" denotes releases that did not chart or were not released in that territory.

=== Live albums ===
Year	Title	Peak chart positions		Certifications (sales thresholds)
Year	Title	JPN	UK	Certifications (sales thresholds)
1975	Live in Japan: Released: March 7, 1975; Recorded: June 1974; Label: A&M/King; Released in Japan only; Formats: LP, cassette, CD	8	—	
1976	Live at the Palladium: Released: December 1976; Recorded: November 1976; Label: A&M; Not released in the U.S.; Formats: LP, cassette, CD	24	28	BPI: Gold
"—" denotes releases that did not chart or were not released in that territory.

=== Compilation albums ===
Worldwide releases or releases limited to the United States.

Year	Album details	Peak chart positions								Certifications (sales thresholds)
Year	Album details	US	AUS	CAN	JPN	NED	NOR	NZ	UK	Certifications (sales thresholds)
1973	The Singles: 1969–1973: Released: November 9, 1973; Label: A&M; Formats: LP, 8-track, cassette, CD, digital download	1	19^{[A]}	1	1	2	—	—	1	RIAA: 7× Platinum; BPI: Platinum; MC: Platinum
1978	The Singles: 1974–1978: Released: November 1978; Label: A&M; Formats: LP, cassette, CD	—	—	—	42	—	—	—	2	BPI: Platinum
1985	Yesterday Once More: Released: 1985; Label: A&M; Formats: LP, cassette, CD, digital download	144	—	—	35	—	—	—	10	RIAA: 2× Platinum; BPI: Platinum; RIAJ: Gold
1990	Only Yesterday: Released: March 1990; Label: A&M; Formats: LP, cassette, CD, digital download	—	9	—	25	3	8	1	1	ARIA: Platinum; BPI: 5× Platinum
1994	Interpretations: Released: 1994; Label: A&M; Formats: Cassette, CD, digital download	—	126	—	—	—	—	—	29	BPI: Gold
1995	Reflections: Released: 1995; Label: A&M; Formats: Cassette, CD, digital download	—	—	—	—	—	—	—	—	BPI: Silver
1997	Love Songs: Released: 1997; Label: A&M; Formats: Cassette, CD, digital download	106	143	—	—	—	34	—	47	RIAA: Gold; BPI: Gold
2000	The Singles: 1969–1981: Released: 2000; Label: A&M; Formats: Cassette, CD, digital download	45	19	—	73	—	—	—	65	BPI: Gold
2000	Gold: Greatest Hits: Released: September 13, 2000; Label: A&M; Formats: CD, digital download	101	—	—	79	—	—	17	4	RIAA: Gold; BPI: 5× Platinum
2003	Carpenters Perform Carpenter: Released: July 29, 2003; Label: A&M; Formats: Cassette, CD, digital download	—	—	—	—	—	—	—	—	
2006	The Ultimate Collection: Released: November 26, 2006; Label: A&M; Formats: CD, digital download	—	41	—	—	17	—	—	—	BPI: Gold
2009	40/40: Released: April 22, 2009; Label: A&M / Universal; Formats: CD, digital download	—	—	—	3	—	2	—	21	BPI: Gold; RIAJ: Gold
2014	Icon: Released: December 24, 2014; Label: A&M / UMe; Formats: CD, digital download	—	—	—	—	—	—	—	—	
2015	The Complete Singles: Released: November 2015; Label: A&M / TJL Productions / UMe; Format: CD	—	—	—	—	—	—	—	—	
2018	Carpenters with the Royal Philharmonic Orchestra: Released: December 7, 2018; Label: A&M, Universal Music Enterprises; Format: LP, CD, digital download	—	29	—	25	—	—	—	8	BPI: Gold
2019	Collected: Released: June 28, 2019; Label: Music On Vinyl; Format: LP	—	—	—	—	25	—	—	—	
2024	Christmas Once More: Released: November 1, 2024; Label: A&M/UMe; Format: LP, CD, Digital download	—	—	—	—	—	—	—	—^{[B]}	
"—" denotes releases that did not chart or were not released in that territory.

Notes

- A Charted in 2000
- B Christmas Once More did not enter UK Albums chart, but it peaked #75 on UK Album sales chart

==== Limited releases ====
List of the charted and/or certified compilation albums limited to certain territories excluding US

Year	Album details	Territory	Peak chart positions							Certifications (sales thresholds)
Year	Album details	Territory	AUS	AUT	GER	JPN	NED	NZ	UK	Certifications (sales thresholds)
1971	Golden Prize: Released: September 10, 1971; Label: A&M/King; Formats: LP, cassette	Japan	—	—	—	3	—	—	—	
1972	Golden Double Deluxe: Released: February 10, 1972; Label: A&M/King; Formats: LP	Japan	—	—	—	10	—	—	—	
1972	Great Hits of the Carpenters: Released: 1972; Label: A&M/King; Formats: LP	Australia	3	—	—	—	—	—	—	
1972	Gem I: Released: October 10, 1972; Label: A&M/King; Formats: LP, cassette	Japan	—	—	—	13	—	—	—	
1973	Max Prize: Released: March 10, 1973; Label: A&M/King; Formats: LP	Japan	—	—	—	26	—	—	—	
1973	Gem II: Released: October 25, 1973; Label: A&M/King; Formats: LP	Japan	—	—	—	3	—	—	—	
1974	Great Hits of the Carpenters Volume 2: Released: 1974; Label: A&M/King; Formats: LP	Australia	24	—	—	—	—	—	—	
1974	Golden Prize Volume II: Released: April 10, 1974; Label: A&M/King; Formats: LP, cassette	Japan	—	—	—	1	—	—	—	
1974	Big Star: Released: June 1, 1974; Label: Cassette; Formats: LP	Japan	—	—	—	20	—	—	—	
1976	Special Series: Released: November 1, 1976; Label: A&M/King; Formats: Cassette	Japan	—	—	—	36	—	—	—	
1980	Beautiful Moments: Released: 1980; Label: A&M; Formats: LP, Cassette	Austria; Germany; Netherlands; Switzerland	—	1	1	—	—	—	—	
1981	Beautiful Lovesongs: Released: 1981; Label: A&M; Formats: LP, Cassette	Netherlands	—	—	—	—	8	—	—	
1982	Ketteiban (The Definitive): Released: June 21, 1982; Label: A&M/Alfa; Formats: Cassette	Japan	—	—	—	61	—	—	—	
1982	The Very Best of the Carpenters: Released: 1982; Label: A&M/Festival; Formats: LP	Australia; New Zealand	1	—	—	—	—	2	—	
1987	The Carpenters Collection - Their Greatest Hits: Released: 1987; Label: A&M; Formats: LP, CD	Benelux	—	—	—	—	31	—	—	
1994	Treasures: Released: 1994; Label: A&M; Formats: CD	Australia	181	—	—	—	—	—	—	
1995	Seishun no Kagayaki: The Best of (22 Hits of the Carpenters): Released: November 10, 1995; Label: A&M / Polydor Japan; Formats: CD, MD, Cassette	Japan	—	—	—	3	—	—	—	RIAJ: 4× Platinum
2001	Yesterday Once More: De Nederlandse Singles Collectie: Released: 2001; Label: A&M / Universal; Formats: CD	Netherlands	—	—	—	—	22	—	—	
2016	The Nation's Favourite Songs: Released: September 2016; Label: A&M; Formats: CD, digital download	UK	—	—	—	—	—	—	2	BPI: Silver
"—" denotes releases that did not chart or were not released in that territory.

== Box sets ==
Year	Album details	Peak chart positions	
Year	Album details	US	NED
1989	The Compact Disc Collection: Released: November 13, 1989; Label: A&M; Formats: 12×CD	—	—
1991	From the Top: Released: 1991; Label: A&M; Formats: 4×CD, digital download	—	—
1996	Christmas Collection: Released: 1996; Label: A&M; Formats: 2×CD, digital download	158	118
2002	The Essential Collection: 1965–1997: Released: 2002; Label: A&M; Formats: 4×CD, digital download	—	—
2017	The Vinyl Collection: Released: November 17, 2017; Label: A&M; Formats: 12×LP	—	—
"—" denotes releases that did not chart or were not released in that territory.

== Singles ==
Year	Single	Chart position											B-side	Certifications	Album
Year	Single	US	US AC	AUS	CAN	CAN AC	GER	IRE	JPN	NED	NZ	UK	B-side	Certifications	Album
1966	"Looking for Love" (Karen Carpenter)	—	—	—	—	—	—	—	—	—	—	—	"I'll Be Yours"		Non-album single
1969	"Ticket to Ride"	54	19	—	—	24	—	—	—	—	—	—	"Your Wonderful Parade"		Offering
1970	"(They Long to Be) Close to You"	1	1	1	1	—	—	6	71	30	9	6	"I Kept on Loving You"	RIAA: Gold; BPI: Gold	Close to You
1970	"We've Only Just Begun"	2	1	6	1	1	—	—	71	—	—	28	"All of My Life"	RIAA: Gold; BPI: Silver	Close to You
1970	"Merry Christmas, Darling"	—	—	—	50	—	—	—	—	—	—	45	"Mr. Guder"		Christmas Portrait
1971	"For All We Know"	3	1	10	5	1	—	—	—	—	6	—	"Don't Be Afraid"	RIAA: Gold	Carpenters
1971	"Rainy Days and Mondays"	2	1	35	3	1	—	—	72	—	—	53^{[C]}	"Saturday"	RIAA: Gold; BPI: Silver	Carpenters
1971	"Superstar"	2^{[D]}	1	35	3	1	—	—	7	19	9	18^{[E]}	"Bless the Beasts and Children"	RIAA: Gold	Carpenters
1971	"Bless the Beasts and Children"	6^{[F]}	26	—	—	25	—	—	85	—	—	—	B-side of "Superstar"		A Song for You
1972	"Hurting Each Other"	2	1	4	2	3	—	—	56	—	7	—	"Maybe It's You"	RIAA: Gold	A Song for You
1972	"It's Going to Take Some Time"	12	2	24	14	1	—	—	48	—	—	—	"Flat Baroque"		A Song for You
1972	"Goodbye to Love"	7	2	25	4	1	—	12	55	—	5	9	"Crystal Lullaby"		A Song for You
1973	"Sing"	3	1	24	4	5	—	—	18	—	7	55^{[C]}	"Druscilla Penny"	RIAA: Gold	Now & Then
1973	"Yesterday Once More"	2	1	9	1	1	21	8	5	5	—	2	"Road Ode"	RIAA: Gold; BPI: Silver	Now & Then
1973	"Top of the World"	1	2	1	1	2	38	3	21^{[G]}	12	14	5	"Heather"	RIAA: Gold; BPI: Silver	A Song for You
1974	"Jambalaya (On the Bayou)"	—	—	95	—	—	50	12	28	3	13	12	"Mr. Guder"		Now & Then
1974	"I Won't Last a Day Without You"	11	1	63	7	1	—	—	40	—	—	32^{[H]}	"One Love"		A Song for You
1974	"Please Mr. Postman"	1	1	1	1	1	10	2	11	29	4	2	"This Masquerade"	RIAA: Gold; BPI: Silver; MC: Gold	Horizon
1975	"Only Yesterday"	4	1	16	2	2	43	5	12	—	10	7	"Happy"		Horizon
1975	"Santa Claus Is Comin' to Town"	—	—	—	—	—	—	—	—	—	—	37	"Merry Christmas, Darling"		Christmas Portrait
1975	"Solitaire"	17	1	61	12	3	—	44	—	—	6	32	"Love Me for What I Am"		Horizon
1976	"There's a Kind of Hush"	12	1	33	8	1	—	7	27	—	5	22	"(I'm Caught Between) Goodbye and I Love You"		A Kind of Hush
1976	"I Need to Be in Love"	25	1	47	24	1	—	14	62	—	—	36	"Sandy"		A Kind of Hush
1976	"Goofus"	56	4	—	82	6	—	—	—	—	—	—	"Boat to Sail"		A Kind of Hush
1976	"Breaking Up Is Hard to Do"	—	—	—	—	—	—	—	71	—	—	—	"I Have You"		A Kind of Hush
1976	"You"	—	—	—	—	—	—	—	—	—	—	—	"I Have You (Philippines Release Only)"		
1977	"All You Get from Love Is a Love Song"	35	4	89	38	5	—	—	68	—	—	54^{[C]}	"I Have You"		Passage
1977	"Calling Occupants of Interplanetary Craft"	32	18	13	18	10	—	1	—	—	19	9	"Can't Smile Without You"		Passage
1977	"Christmas Song"	—	—	—	—	—	—	—	—	—	—	—	"Merry Christmas Darling"		Christmas Portrait
1978	"Sweet, Sweet Smile"	44^{[I]}	7	100	43	7	22	—	59	22	—	40	"I Have You"		Passage
1978	"I Believe You"	68	9	—	81	22	—	—	—	—	—	—	"B'wana, She No Home"		Made in America
1981	"Touch Me When We're Dancing"	16	1	78	—	4	—	—	—	—	22	—	"Because We Are in Love (The Wedding Song)"		Made in America
1981	"(Want You) Back in My Life Again"	72	14	—	—	—	—	—	—	—	—	—	"Somebody's Been Lyin'"		Made in America
1981	"Those Good Old Dreams"	63	21	—	—	9	—	—	—	—	—	—	"When It's Gone (It's Just Gone)"		Made in America
1982	"Beechwood 4-5789"	74	18	—	—	—	—	—	—	—	9	—	"Two Sides"		Made in America
1983	"Make Believe It's Your First Time"	101	7	80	—	2	—	20	—	—	—	60	"Look to Your Dreams"		Voice of the Heart
1984	"Your Baby Doesn't Love You Anymore"	—	12	—	—	21	—	—	—	—	—	—	"Sailing on the Tide"		Voice of the Heart
1984	"Now"	—	—	—	—	—	—	—	—	—	—	—	"Look to Your Dreams"		Voice of the Heart
1984	"Little Altar Boy"	—	—	—	—	—	—	—	—	—	—	—	"Do You Hear What I Hear?"		An Old Fashioned Christmas
1986	"Honolulu City Lights"	—	—	—	—	—	—	—	—	—	—	—	"I Just Fall in Love Again"		Lovelines
1989	"If I Had You" (Karen Carpenter)	—	18	—	—	—	—	—	—	—	—	—	"The Uninvited Guest"		Lovelines
1990	"Merry Christmas, Darling" (re-issue)	—	—	—	—	—	—	18	—	—	—	25^{[J]}	"(They Long to Be) Close to You"		Christmas Portrait
1991	"Let Me Be the One" (promotional single)	—	—	—	—	—	—	—	—	—	—	—			From the Top
1993	"Rainy Days and Mondays" (re-issue)	—	—	—	—	—	—	—	—	—	—	63	"Goodbye to Love"		From the Top
1994	"Tryin' to Get the Feeling Again"	—	—	—	—	—	—	—	—	—	—	44	"Sing"		Interpretations
1995	"I Need to Be in Love" (Japan re-issue)	—	—	—	—	—	—	—	5	—	—	—	"Top of the World"	RIAJ: 4× Platinum	22 Hits of the Carpenters
1996	"Ave Maria"	—	—	—	—	—	—	—	—	—	—	—	"Merry Christmas, Darling"		Christmas Portrait
2001	"The Rainbow Connection"	—	—	—	—	—	—	—	47	—	—	—	"Leave Yesterday Behind", "Medley"		As Time Goes By
2003	"Top of the World" (Japan re-issue)	—	—	—	—	—	—	—	83	—	—	—	"Top of the World", "Sing" (karaoke)		Gold
"—" denotes releases that did not chart or were not released in that territory.

=== Notes ===
- C Chart position is from the official UK "Breakers List"
- D When “Superstar” reached its 10th week, "Bless The Beasts and Children" significantly grew in its own airplay. Billboard Hot 100 began listing the single as "Superstar"/"Bless The Beasts and Children", charting first at #16 on 11/20/71.
- E "Superstar" and "For All We Know" were released as a double A-side in the UK.
- F "Bless The Beasts and Children peaked at #67 on 1/15/72 as an A-side, following its peak at #16 when listed as the B-side of "Superstar".
- G "Top of the World" charted four times in Japan: #21 in 1972, #52 in 1973 (coincided with the song's US success), in 1995 it was the B-side of the reissue of "I Need to Be in Love", and subsequently it charted a fourth time (as an A-side) #83 in 2003.
- H "I Won't Last a Day Without You" was originally released as an A-side in the UK in 1972 with "Goodbye to Love" as the B-side and charted at #49. However, the sides were switched shortly after the record's release. The former was later released as an A-side in the UK in 1974 to coincide with its first US release as an A-side.
- I "Sweet, Sweet Smile" peaked at #8 on Billboard's Country singles chart.
- J The UK re-issue of "Merry Christmas, Darling" in 1990 features the second recorded version of the song from their 1978 Christmas Portrait album as opposed to the original 1970 version.

=== Holiday 100 chart entries ===
Since many radio stations in the US adopt a format change to Christmas music each December, many holiday hits have an annual spike in popularity during the last few weeks of the year and are retired once the season is over. In December 2011, Billboard began a Holiday Songs chart with 50 positions that monitors the last five weeks of each year to "rank the top holiday hits of all eras using the same methodology as the Hot 100, blending streaming, airplay, and sales data", and in 2013 the number of positions on the chart was doubled, resulting in the Holiday 100. A handful of Carpenters recordings have made appearances on the Holiday 100 and are noted below according to the holiday season in which they charted there.

Title	Holiday season peak chart positions															Album
Title	2011	2012	2013	2014	2015	2016	2017	2018	2019	2020	2021	2022	2023	2024	2025	Album
"Have Yourself a Merry Little Christmas"	32	47	55	82	81	64	74	—	—	—	—	—	—	—	—	Christmas Portrait
"I'll Be Home for Christmas"	—	—	—	—	72	—	—	—	—	—	—	—	—	—	—	Christmas Portrait
"Merry Christmas Darling"	35	24	38	53	63	25	57	38	40	81	73	73	83	91	82	Christmas Portrait
"Sleigh Ride"	—	—	78	99	—	—	95	—	—	—	—	—	—	—	—	Christmas Portrait
"(There's No Place Like) Home for the Holidays"	—	41	45	65	57	36	92	82	88	—	97	—	—	—	—	An Old-Fashioned Christmas
"—" denotes releases that did not chart.

== Other appearances ==
Year	Song	Album
1971	"Bless the Beasts and Children" (soundtrack version)	Bless the Beasts and Children

== Videos ==
=== Video albums ===
Year	Title	Notes	Certifications
1985	Yesterday Once More	Repackaged in 2002 on DVD under the name Gold: Greatest Hits; Label: A&M Video; Formats: Betamax, video cassette, laserdisc, DVD	RIAA: Gold; ARIA: Gold; BPI: Gold
1995	Interpretations	Released on May 9, 1995; Label: A&M Video; Formats: Video cassette, laserdisc, DVD	BPI: Gold
1996	Live in Japan 1974 （ライヴ・イン・ジャパン～イエスタデイ・ワンス・モア武道館 1974）	Released originally in September 26, 1996 on VHS & LD by PolyGram Japan; DVD released March 8, 2017; Label: Universal Music Japan; Formats: Video cassette, laserdisc, DVD	
1998	Close to You: Remembering the Carpenters	Released on March 1, 1998; Label: MPI Home Video; Formats: Video cassette, laserdisc, DVD	RIAA: Gold
2016	Carpenters: Christmas Memories	Released on 2016; Available with PBS donation only; Label: A&M Video; Formats: DVD	

=== Music videos ===
- "Dancing in the Street" (1968)
- "Ticket to Ride" (1969)
- "(They Long to Be) Close to You" (1970)
- "We've Only Just Begun" (1970)
- "For All We Know" (1971)
- "Rainy Days and Mondays" (1971)
- "Superstar" (1971)
- "Hurting Each Other" (1972)
- "Top of the World" (1973)
- "Yesterday Once More" (1973)
- "Jambalaya (On the Bayou)" (1974)
- "Sing" (1974)
- "Please Mr. Postman" (1974)
- "Only Yesterday" (1975)
- "There's a Kind of Hush" (1976)
- "I Need to Be in Love" (1976)
- "Goofus" (1976)
- "All You Get from Love Is a Love Song" (1977)
- "Calling Occupants of Interplanetary Craft" (1977)
- "Sweet, Sweet Smile" (1978)
- "Little Girl Blue" (1979)
- "When I Fall in Love (1980)
- "Touch Me When We're Dancing" (1981)
- "(Want You) Back in My Life Again" (1981)
- "Those Good Old Dreams" (1981)
- "Beechwood 4-5789" (1982)
- "Now" (1983)

== See also ==
- List of songs recorded by The Carpenters
- If I Were a Carpenter (tribute album)
- Classic Carpenters (tribute album)
