= The Ultimate Collection (The Carpenters album) =

Compilation album by the Carpenters
- Released: 2006
- Recorded: 1969–1997
- Genre: Pop
- Label: Universal Music Distribution
- Producer: Richard Carpenter

The Carpenters chronology
Gold: 35th Anniversary Edition (2004)	The Ultimate Collection (2006)	40/40 (2009)

The Ultimate Collection is a 3-CD set by the Carpenters released in 2006. It contains many of their popular songs, like "(They Long to Be) Close to You" and "Top of the World", and their album cuts, like "Desperado" and "Jambalaya (On the Bayou)". All of the songs are taken directly from the original album. In the case of "Yesterday Once More", it fades into a motorcycle engine, which subsequently fades into the oldies medley on the Now & Then album.

The album is the first compilation to contain all of their charting US singles (with the exception of the Christmas singles). The UK and Australian versions did not include the bonus disc and also had a slightly different track listing; substituting "Sandy" for "Goofus", "When It's Gone" for "(Want You) Back in My Life Again" and "Your Baby Doesn't Love You Anymore" for "Make Believe It's Your First Time", whilst removing "Beechwood 4-5789" and adding "You're the One" and "Where Do I Go from Here".

== Track listing ==
=== Disc one (1969–1974) ===
1. "Ticket to Ride" (1969)
2. "(They Long to Be) Close to You" (1970)
3. "We've Only Just Begun" (1970)
4. "For All We Know" (1971)
5. "Rainy Days and Mondays" (1971)
6. "Superstar" (1971)
7. "Bless the Beasts and Children" (1971)
8. "Hurting Each Other" (1971)
9. "It's Going to Take Some Time" (1972)
10. "Goodbye to Love" (1972)
11. "Top of the World" (1973)
12. "I Won't Last a Day Without You" (1974)
13. "Sing" (1973)
14. "Yesterday Once More" (1973)
15. "This Masquerade" (1973)
16. "Jambalaya (On the Bayou)" (1973)
17. "Please Mr. Postman" (1974)

=== Disc two (1975–1995) ===
1. "Desperado" (1975)
2. "Only Yesterday" (1975)
3. "Solitaire" (1975)
4. "There's a Kind of Hush (All Over the World)" (1976)
5. "I Need to Be in Love" (1976)
6. "Goofus" (1976)
7. "All You Get from Love Is a Love Song" (1977)
8. "Calling Occupants of Interplanetary Craft" (1977)
9. "Sweet, Sweet Smile" (1977)
10. "I Believe You" (1978)
11. "Touch Me When We're Dancing" (1981)
12. "(Want You) Back in My Life Again" (1981)
13. "Those Good Old Dreams" (1981)
14. "Beechwood 4-5789" (1982)
15. "Now" (1982)
16. "Make Believe It's Your First Time" (recorded in 1980; record released in 1983)
17. "Tryin' to Get the Feeling Again" (recorded in 1975; released on CD in 1995)

=== Disc three (Bonus songs: 1979–1997) ===
1. "Lovelines" (recorded in 1979; released on CD in 1989 and 1996)*
2. "If I Had You" (recorded in 1979; released on CD in 1989 and 1996)*
3. "Still Crazy After All These Years" (recorded in 1979; released on CD in 1996)*
4. "When Time Was All We Had" (ca. 1985)**
5. "Calling Your Name Again" (ca. 1985)**
6. "Sandy" (1997)***
7. "Karen's Theme" (1997)***

* Karen Carpenter solo - Lovelines and/or Karen Carpenter
** Richard Carpenter solo - Time
*** Richard Carpenter solo - Pianist • Arranger • Composer • Conductor

== Charts ==
Chart (2006–2007)	Peak position
Australian Albums (ARIA)	41
Dutch Albums (Album Top 100)	17
Scottish Albums (Official Charts)	71
UK Albums (Official Charts)	53

== Certifications ==
Region	Certification	Certified units/sales
United Kingdom (BPI)	Gold	100,000^{^}
^{^} Shipments figures based on certification alone.
