= Gold: Greatest Hits (The Carpenters album) =

Compilation album by the Carpenters
- Released: September 13, 2000; February 10, 2004 (35th Anniversary Edition)
- Recorded: 1969–1981
- Genre: Pop
- Length: 75:59; 138:49 (35th Anniversary Edition)
- Label: A&M/Universal Music Distribution
- Producer: Richard Carpenter

The Carpenters chronology
The Singles: 1969–1981 (2000)	Gold: Greatest Hits (2000)	As Time Goes By (2001)

35th Anniversary Edition chronology
Carpenters Perform Carpenter (2003)	Gold: 35th Anniversary Edition	The Ultimate Collection (2006)

Professional ratings
Review scores
Source	Rating
Allmusic	4/5 stars

Gold: Greatest Hits is a compilation album by American duo the Carpenters released in 2000.

== Overview ==
The 20 track compilation covers the period from 1969 to 1981. Some editions contained "Hurting Each Other" as a bonus track.

The compilation was repackaged as a 2001 dutch Yesterday Once More: De Nederlandse Singles Collectie by replacing "Calling Occupants of Interplanetary Craft" with "Sweet, Sweet Smile" and placing it as track 6.

The accompanying video album of the same name followed in 2002.

=== 35th Anniversary Edition ===
Gold: 35th Anniversary Edition is an expanded two-disc version of the compilation released in early 2004. It contains all of the tracks of the earlier 2000 version and expands the timeline to the duo's latest release, As Time Goes By. It also features the single version of "Solitaire" for the first time on CD.

The Canadian 2005 release of the album is simply titled Gold, without a subtitle, and features a colour photo cover, not the original black cover.

== Track listing ==
=== Original release ===
1. "Yesterday Once More" – 3:59
2. "Superstar" – 3:47
3. "Rainy Days and Mondays" (1991 Remix) – 3:35
4. "Goodbye to Love" – 3:56
5. "It's Going to Take Some Time" – 2:59
6. "I Won't Last a Day Without You" – 3:54
7. "For All We Know" – 2:32
8. "Jambalaya (On the Bayou)" – 3:37
9. "Touch Me When We're Dancing" – 3:21
10. "Please Mr. Postman" – 2:48
11. "I Need to Be in Love" – 3:50
12. "Solitaire" – 4:41
13. "We've Only Just Begun" – 3:05
14. "(They Long to Be) Close to You" (1991 Remix) – 3:41
15. "This Masquerade" (1990 Remix) – 4:53
16. "Ticket to Ride" – 4:09
17. "Top of the World" (Single Version) – 2:58
18. "Only Yesterday" – 3:46
19. "Sing" – 3:20
20. "Calling Occupants of Interplanetary Craft" – 7:09

=== 35th Anniversary Edition ===
==== Disc 1 ====
No.	Title	Writer(s)	Original album	Length
1.	"Superstar" (1991 Remix)	Bonnie Bramlett, Leon Russell	Carpenters, 1971	3:46
2.	"Rainy Days and Mondays" (1991 Remix)	Roger Nichols, Paul Williams	Carpenters	3:35
3.	"Top of the World" (Single Version)	John Bettis, Richard Carpenter	The Singles: 1969–1973, 1973	3:02
4.	"Maybe It's You" (1990 Remix)	Bettis, Carpenter	Close to You, 1970	3:03
5.	"Let Me Be the One"	Nichols, Williams	Carpenters	2:25
6.	"Reason to Believe" (1987 Remix)	Tim Hardin	Close to You	3:04
7.	"Jambalaya (On the Bayou)" (1991 Remix)	Moon Mullican, Hank Williams	Now & Then, 1973	3:39
8.	"Leave Yesterday Behind"	Fred Karlin	As Time Goes By, 2001	3:32
9.	"Your Baby Doesn't Love You Anymore"	Larry Weiss	Voice of the Heart, 1983	3:51
10.	"Bless the Beasts and Children" (1991 Remix)	Perry Botkin Jr., Barry De Vorzon	A Song for You, 1972	3:15
11.	"It's Going to Take Some Time" (1989 Remix)	Carole King, Toni Stern	A Song for You	2:57
12.	"The Rainbow Connection"	Kenneth Ascher, Williams	As Time Goes By	4:36
13.	"Only Yesterday" (1991 Remix)	Bettis, Carpenter	Horizon, 1975	3:47
14.	"Sweet, Sweet Smile"	Juice Newton, Otha Young	Passage, 1977	3:02
15.	"There's a Kind of Hush (All Over the World)" (1985 Remix)	Les Reed, Geoff Stephens	A Kind of Hush, 1976	3:03
16.	"California Dreamin'" (Demo)	John Phillips, Michelle Phillips	As Time Goes By	2:30
17.	"Solitaire" (Single Version)	Phil Cody, Neil Sedaka	Horizon	4:41
18.	"We've Only Just Begun" (1991 Remix)	Nichols, Williams	Close to You	3:04
19.	"This Masquerade" (1990 Remix)	Russell	Now & Then	4:53
20.	"Calling Occupants of Interplanetary Craft (The Recognized Anthem of World Contact Day)" (1989 Remix)	Terry Draper, John Woloschuk	Passage	7:09
Total length:				73:08

==== Disc 2 ====
No.	Title	Writer(s)	Original album	Length
1.	"Yesterday Once More" (1991 Remix)	Bettis, Carpenter	Now & Then	3:58
2.	"Please Mr. Postman" (1991 Remix)	Robert Bateman, Georgia Dobbins, William Garrett, Freddie Gorman, Brian Holland	Horizon	2:47
3.	"Hurting Each Other" (1991 Remix)	Gary Geld, Peter Udell	A Song for You	2:47
4.	"I Need to Be in Love" (1990 Remix)	Bettis, Carpenter, Albert Hammond	A Kind of Hush	3:49
5.	"Merry Christmas, Darling" (Album version)	Carpenter, Frank Pooler	Christmas Portrait, 1978	3:05
6.	"(They Long to Be) Close to You" (1991 Remix)	Burt Bacharach, Hal David	Close to You	3:40
7.	"All You Get from Love Is a Love Song"	Steve Eaton	Passage	3:46
8.	"Sing" (1994 Remix)	Joe Raposo	Now & Then	3:18
9.	"Make Believe It's Your First Time"	Bob Morrison, Johnny Wilson	Voice of the Heart	4:08
10.	"Ticket to Ride" (1973 Version)	John Lennon, Paul McCartney	The Singles: 1969–1973	4:09
11.	"Goodbye to Love" (1991 Remix)	Bettis, Carpenter	A Song for You	3:55
12.	"I Just Fall in Love Again"	Steve Dorff, Larry Herbstritt	Passage	4:03
13.	"I Believe You"	Dick Addrisi, Don Addrisi	Made in America, 1981	3:55
14.	"Tryin' to Get the Feeling Again"	David Pomeranz	Interpretations: A 25th Anniversary Celebration, 1994	4:22
15.	"For All We Know" (1990 Remix)	Arthur James, Karlin, Robb Wilson	Carpenters	2:32
16.	"Touch Me When We're Dancing"	Kenny Bell, Terry Skinner, Jerry Lee Wallace	Made in America	3:20
17.	"I Won't Last a Day Without You" (1991 Remix)	Nichols, Williams	A Song for You	3:54
18.	"Mr. Guder" (1991 Remix)	Bettis, Carpenter	Close to You	3:21
19.	"A Song for You" (1987 Remix)	Russell	A Song for You	4:37
20.	"Karen's Theme" (Performed by Richard Carpenter)	Carpenter	Pianist, Arranger, Composer, Conductor, 1998	2:41
Total length:				72:34

== Personnel ==
- Richard Carpenter – compilation producer, liner notes
- Bernie Grundman – mastering at Bernie Grundman Mastering
- Stewart Whitmore – assembling at Marcussen Mastering
- Mike Ragogna – project director
- Adam Abrams, Barry Korkin and Lee Lodyga – project coordination

== Charts ==
=== Gold: Greatest Hits ===
Chart (2000–2005)	Peak position
Danish Albums (Hitlisten)	24
European Albums (Eurotipsheet)	82
New Zealand Albums (RMNZ)	17
Scottish Albums (Official Charts)	6
UK Albums (Official Charts)	4

Chart (2025)	Peak position
Greek Albums (IFPI)	1

=== Gold: 35th Anniversary Edition ===
Chart (2005)	Peak position
US Billboard 200	101

== Certifications ==
Region	Certification	Certified units/sales
New Zealand (RMNZ)	2× Platinum	30,000^{^}
United Kingdom (BPI)	5× Platinum	1,500,000^{‡}
United States (RIAA)	Gold	500,000^{^}
Summaries
Europe (IFPI)	Platinum	1,000,000^{*}
^{*} Sales figures based on certification alone.^{^} Shipments figures based on certification alone.^{‡} Sales+streaming figures based on certification alone.
