= 40/40 (The Carpenters album) =

- cover of the Japanese edition

Compilation album by the Carpenters
- Released: April 22, 2009 (Japan); October 20, 2009 (worldwide)
- Recorded: 1969–1982
- Genre: Pop
- Label: A&M/Universal Music Distribution
- Producer: Richard Carpenter

The Carpenters chronology
The Ultimate Collection (2006)	40/40 (2009)	Icon (2014)

Professional ratings
Review scores
Source	Rating
AllMusic	4/5 stars

40/40 (originally subtitled The Best Selection) is a two-disc compilation by American pop group the Carpenters. The album features 40 songs that span their entire career (10 of them were determined by Japanese fan voting), and first issued by Universal Japan on April 22, 2009 (forty years after they signed to A&M Records). It was issued worldwide half a year later, leaving out its subtitle.

The cover art was taken from the photo sessions for the album Horizon, showing a healthy and glowing Karen and Richard. A television spot aired for the album, prominently featuring the famous "Carpenters" logo. Included in this set is the original, long version of a UK top-10 hit "Calling Occupants of Interplanetary Craft", and their last top-20 U.S. hit "Touch Me When We're Dancing".

In Japan, 40/40 received a commercial success upon its release. It debuted and peaked at the number-three position on the Japanese Oricon, making them one of the Western artists with the most top-ten albums in the history of that country's chart (following Madonna and The Beatles, tying with Queen, The Rolling Stones and Paul McCartney/Wings). The album also charted in the UK, peaking at #21 in November 2009.

The original Japanese release was pressed on the SHM-CD (super high material CD) with improved sound, while the cheaper international edition was issued on the standard CD format. One other change is that the Japanese track listing included "Leave Yesterday Behind" while the standard worldwide release substituted "Touch Me When We're Dancing".

== Track listing ==
Disc 1
No.	Title	Writer(s)	Length
1.	"Yesterday Once More (remix)"	John Bettis, Richard Carpenter	3:58
2.	"Superstar (remix)"	Bonnie Bramlett, Leon Russell	3:49
3.	"Rainy Days and Mondays (remix)"	Roger Nichols, Paul Williams	3:35
4.	"Top of the World (remix)"	Bettis, Carpenter	2:58
5.	"Ticket to Ride (remix)"	Lennon–McCartney	4:09
6.	"Love is Surrender (remix)"	Ralph Carmichael	1:58
7.	"Maybe It's You (remix)"	Bettis, Carpenter	3:01
8.	"Reason to Believe (remix)"	Tim Hardin	3:04
9.	"Where Do I Go from Here (remix)"	Parker McGee	4:25
10.	"This Masquerade (remix)"	Russell	4:53
11.	"It's Going to Take Some Time (remix)"	Carole King, Toni Stern	2:57
12.	"One More Time (remix)"	Lewis Anderson	3:31
13.	"Those Good Old Dreams (remix)"	Bettis, Carpenter	4:13
14.	"For All We Know (remix)"	Fred Karlin, Jimmy Griffin, Robb Royer	2:31
15.	"Crystal Lullaby (remix)"	Bettis, Carpenter	3:56
16.	"I Believe You"	Dick Addrisi, Don Addrisi	3:54
17.	"(They Long to Be) Close to You (remix)"	Burt Bacharach, Hal David	3:40
18.	"Theme from Bless the Beasts and Children (remix)"	Barry De Vorzon, Perry Botkin Jr.	3:15
19.	"All You Get from Love Is a Love Song"	Steve Eaton	3:46
20.	"Calling Occupants of Interplanetary Craft (The Recognized Anthem of World Contact Day) (remix)"	Klaatu (Terry Draper and John Woloschuk)	7:09

Disc 2
No.	Title	Writer(s)	Length
1.	"I Need to Be in Love"	Bettis, Carpenter, Albert Hammond	3:48
2.	"Now"	Nichols, Dean Pitchford	3:50
3.	"Solitaire"	Neil Sedaka, Phil Cody	4:40
4.	"Please Mr. Postman"	Robert Bateman, Georgia Dobbins, William Garrett, Freddie Gorman, Brian Holland	2:48
5.	"Hurting Each Other"	Gary Geld, Peter Udell	2:47
6.	"I Won't Last a Day Without You"	Nichols, Williams	3:54
7.	"Sweet, Sweet Smile"	Otha Young, Juice Newton	3:02
8.	"A Song for You"	Russell	4:37
9.	"Ordinary Fool"	Williams	3:42
10.	"When You've Got What It Takes"	William M. Lane, Nichols	3:41
11.	"Goodbye to Love"	Bettis, Carpenter	3:56
12.	"Your Baby Doesn't Love You Anymore"	Larry Weiss	3:51
13.	"Sing"	Joe Raposo	3:18
14.	"Baby It's You"	Bacharach, Mack David, Barney Williams	2:52
15.	"Let Me Be the One"	Nichols, Williams	2:49
16.	"Only Yesterday"	Bettis, Carpenter	3:46
17.	"Jambalaya (On the Bayou)"	Hank Williams, Moon Mullican	3:39
18.	"Touch Me When We're Dancing"	Ken Bell, Terry Skinner and J. L. Wallace	3:20
19.	"We've Only Just Begun"	Nichols, Williams	3:04
20.	"When It's Gone (It's Just Gone)"	Randy Handley	5:00

== Charts ==
Chart (2009–2010)	Peak position
Danish Albums (Hitlisten)	7
Japanese Albums (Oricon)	3
Norwegian Albums (VG-lista)	2
Scottish Albums (Official Charts)	25
Spanish Albums (Promusicae)	92
UK Albums (Official Charts)	21

== Certifications ==
Region	Certification	Certified units/sales
Japan (RIAJ)	Gold	100,000^{^}
United Kingdom (BPI)	Gold	100,000^{^}
^{^} Shipments figures based on certification alone.
