= Yesterday Once More (album) =

Compilation album by the Carpenters
- Released: 1984
- Recorded: 1969–1983
- Genre: Pop
- Length: 98:04 (1985); 104:25 (1998)
- Label: A&M
- Producers: Richard Carpenter, Jack Daugherty, Karen Carpenter

The Carpenters chronology
| An Old-Fashioned Christmas (1984) | Yesterday Once More (1984) | Lovelines (1989) |

Professional ratings
Review scores
| Source | Rating |
|---|---|
| AllMusic | 4.5/5 stars |

Yesterday Once More is a two-disc compilation album by American pop group the Carpenters.

== Release ==
The compilations was originally released in 1985 and has been certified platinum in both the US and UK.

The album was re-released in 1987 as Classics Volume 2 in the A&M 25th Anniversary Classics series. It was a simple repackage, reusing the 1985 glass CD masters, but with different artwork.

It was re-released in 1998 with the addition of an extra track, "I Just Fall in Love Again," a revised track order, and remastered in 24-bit sound with new notes by Paul Grein.

== Track listing (1985) ==
=== Disc one ===
1. "Yesterday Once More" (Remix) (Richard Carpenter, John Bettis) – 3:58
2. "Superstar" (Remix) (Leon Russell, Bonnie Bramlett) – 3:45
3. "Rainy Days and Mondays" (Remix) (Paul Williams, Roger Nichols) – 3:38
4. "(Want You) Back in My Life Again" (Kerry Chater, Chris Christian) – 3:39
5. "Ticket to Ride" (1973 version) (Lennon–McCartney)– 4:07
6. "Goodbye to Love" (Remix) (Carpenter, Bettis) – 3:57
7. "Bless the Beasts and Children" (Remix) (Barry DeVorzon, Perry Botkin Jr.) – 3:16
8. "It's Going to Take Some Time" (Carole King, Toni Stern) – 2:55
9. "Calling Occupants of Interplanetary Craft" (Terry Draper, John Woloschuk) – 7:07
10. "Sweet, Sweet Smile" (Juice Newton, Otha Young) – 2:57
11. "I Won't Last a Day Without You" (Williams, Nichols) – 3:50
12. "For All We Know" (single) (Fred Karlin, Arthur James, Robb Wilson) – 2:29
13. "Touch Me When We're Dancing" (Terry Skinner, Kenny Bell, J.L. Wallace) – 3:23

=== Disc two ===
1. "There's a Kind of Hush" (Remix) (Les Reed, Geoff Stephens) – 3:04
2. "This Masquerade" (Russell) – 4:50
3. "Hurting Each Other" (Gary Geld, Peter Udell) – 2:46
4. "Please Mr. Postman" (Georgia Dobbins, William Garrett, Freddie Gorman, Brian Holland, Robert Bateman) – 2:52
5. "I Need to Be in Love" (Single edit, remix) (Carpenter, Bettis, Albert Hammond) – 3:29
6. "Make Believe It's Your First Time" (alternate) (Bob Morrison, Johnny Wilson) – 4:03
7. "All You Get from Love Is a Love Song" (Steve Eaton) – 3:46
8. "Top of the World" (Carpenter, Bettis) – 2:56
9. "Because We Are in Love (The Wedding Song)" (Carpenter, Bettis) – 5:00
10. "We've Only Just Begun" (remix) (Williams, Nichols) – 3:03
11. "Those Good Old Dreams" (Carpenter, Bettis) – 4:12
12. "Sing" (Joe Raposo) – 3:17
13. "Only Yesterday" (edit) (Carpenter, Bettis) – 3:50
14. "(They Long to Be) Close to You" (single) (Burt Bacharach, Hal David) – 3:43

== Track listing (1998) ==
=== Disc one ===
1. "Yesterday Once More" (Carpenter, Bettis) – 3:58
2. "Superstar" (Russell, Bramlett) – 3:48
3. "Rainy Days and Mondays" (Williams, Nichols) – 3:40
4. "(Want You) Back in My Life Again" (Chater, Christian) – 3:39
5. "Ticket to Ride" (Lennon–McCartney) – 4:08
6. "Goodbye to Love" (Carpenter, Bettis) – 3:58
7. "Bless the Beasts and Children" (De Vorzon, Botkin) – 3:05
8. "It's Going to Take Some Time" (King, Stern) – 2:57
9. "There's a Kind of Hush (All Over the World)" (Reed, Stephens) – 3:03
10. "Sweet, Sweet Smile" (Newton, Young) – 3:02
11. "I Won't Last a Day Without You" (Williams, Nichols) – 3:54
12. "For All We Know" (Karlin, James, Wilson) – 2:31
13. "Touch Me When We're Dancing" (Skinner, Bell, Wallace) – 3:20
14. "Calling Occupants of Interplanetary Craft" (Draper, Woloschuk) – 7:09

=== Disc two ===
1. "I Just Fall in Love Again" (Steve Dorff, Larry Herbstritt, Gloria Sklerov, Harry Lloyd) – 4:03
2. "This Masquerade" (Russell) – 4:53
3. "Hurting Each Other" (Geld, Udell) – 2:46
4. "Please Mr. Postman" (Bateman, Dobbins, Garrett, Gorman, Holland) – 2:50
5. "I Need to Be in Love" (Carpenter, Bettis, Hammond) – 3:49
6. "Make Believe It's Your First Time" (Morrison, Wilson) – 4:07
7. "All You Get from Love Is a Love Song" (Eaton) – 3:46
8. "Top of the World" (Carpenter, Bettis) – 3:00
9. "Because We Are in Love (The Wedding Song)" (Carpenter, Bettis) – 5:01
10. "We've Only Just Begun" (Williams, Nichols) – 3:04
11. "Those Good Old Dreams" (Carpenter, Bettis) – 4:12
12. "Sing" (Raposo) – 3:18
13. "Only Yesterday" (Carpenter, Bettis) – 4:10
14. "(They Long to Be) Close to You" (Bacharach, David) – 4:33

== Charts ==
| Chart (1984–1985) | Peak position |
|---|---|
| European Albums (Eurotipsheet) | 57 |
| UK Albums (Official Charts) | 10 |
| US Billboard 200 | 144 |
| US Cash Box Top 200 Albums | 149 |

| Chart (1993) | Peak position |
|---|---|
| Japanese Albums (Oricon) | 24 |

| Chart (2004) | Peak position |
|---|---|
| Singaporean Albums (RIAS) | 1 |

== Certifications ==
Certifications for Yesterday Once More
| Region | Certification | Certified units/sales |
|---|---|---|
| Hong Kong (IFPI Hong Kong) | Platinum | 20,000^{*} |
| Japan (RIAJ) | Gold | 100,000^{^} |
| United Kingdom (BPI) | Platinum | 300,000^{^} |
| United States (RIAA) | 2× Platinum | 2,000,000^{^} |
^{*} Sales figures based on certification alone.^{^} Shipments figures based on certification alone.
