= The Very Best of the Carpenters =

Greatest hits album by Carpenters
- Released: 1982
- Recorded: 1969–1981
- Genres: Pop, adult contemporary
- Label: Festival (cat no. RML 52017)
- Producer: Richard Carpenter

Carpenters chronology
Made in America (1981)	The Very Best of the Carpenters (1982)	Voice of the Heart (1983)

Live/compilation chronology
The Singles: 1974–1978 (1978)	The Very Best of the Carpenters (1982)	Yesterday Once More (1985)

The Very Best of the Carpenters is a compilation album by the Carpenters, released in 1982 by Festival Records in Australia and New Zealand (cat no. RML 52017). The album spent one week at the top of the Australian albums chart in 1983.

== Overview ==
The album was the only Oceania-exclusive compilation of the Carpenters' material released by Festival Records. Although the album is not specifically a "greatest hits" collection, several of the tracks did not reach the charts in either Australia or New Zealand: "Ticket to Ride"; "This Masquerade", as it was not a single; and "Those Good Old Dreams". "Beechwood 4-5789" was only a hit in New Zealand, reaching number 10 on the singles chart there in early 1982.

On the cover of the album, "It's Going to Take Some Time" is titled "It's Going to Take Some Time This Time" and "(They Long to Be) Close to You" is simply rendered "Close to You".

This album is also noteworthy in that, for decades, it was the only album appearance of the single-edit of "Calling Occupants of Interplanetary Craft".

== Track listing ==
Side one

1. "Top of the World"
2. "Ticket to Ride"
3. "Only Yesterday"
4. "This Masquerade"
5. "Beechwood 4-5789"
6. "It's Going to Take Some Time"
7. "Superstar"
8. "Rainy Days and Mondays"
9. "Goodbye to Love"

Side two

10. "We've Only Just Begun"
11. "Those Good Old Dreams"
12. "Calling Occupants of Interplanetary Craft"
13. "Yesterday Once More"
14. "Please Mr. Postman"
15. "Hurting Each Other"
16. "Sing"
17. "For All We Know"
18. "Close to You"

== Charts ==
Chart (1983)	Peak position
Australian Kent Music Report	1
New Zealand Albums Chart	2

== Certifications ==
Region	Certification	Certified units/sales
Australia (ARIA)	Platinum	50,000^{^}
New Zealand (RMNZ)	Platinum	15,000^{^}
^{^} Shipments figures based on certification alone.
