= The Singles: 1969–1981 =

Compilation album by the Carpenters
- Released: May 23, 2000
- Recorded: 1969–1981
- Genre: Pop
- Length: 71:41
- Label: A&M
- Producer: Richard Carpenter

The Carpenters chronology
Love Songs (1997)	The Singles: 1969–1981 (2000)	Gold: Greatest Hits (2000)

Alternative cover
- European Cover

Professional ratings
Review scores
Source	Rating
AllMusic	5/5 stars

The Singles: 1969–1981 is a compilation album by the American duo the Carpenters, released in 2000.

The album contains all of the tracks from The Singles: 1969–1973.

A SACD with the same name and artwork but different tracklisting and 5.1 mix was released in 2004.

== Track listing ==
Regular CD:

1. "For All We Know" (1990 Remix) (from Carpenters) – 2:32
2. "I Believe You" (from Made in America) – 3:54
3. "It's Going to Take Some Time" (1989 Remix) (from A Song for You) – 2:59
4. "We've Only Just Begun" (from Close to You) – 3:04
5. "Those Good Old Dreams" (from Made in America) – 4:12
6. "Superstar" (1991 Remix) (from Carpenters) – 3:46
7. "Rainy Days and Mondays" (1991 Remix) (from Carpenters) – 3:33
8. "Goodbye to Love" (1991 Remix) (from A Song for You) – 3:55
9. "All You Get from Love Is a Love Song" (from Passage) – 3:46
10. "Top of the World" (1973 Version) (from A Song for You) – 2:58
11. "Only Yesterday" (from Horizon) – 3:47
12. "Ticket to Ride" (from Ticket to Ride) – 4:09
13. "Hurting Each Other" (1991 Remix) (from A Song for You) – 2:47
14. "Yesterday Once More" (1991 Remix) (from Now & Then) – 3:57
15. "Sing" (1994 Remix) (from Now & Then) – 3:18
16. "Touch Me When We're Dancing" (from Made in America) – 3:20
17. "Please Mr. Postman" (1991 Remix) (from Horizon) – 2:47
18. "I Need to Be in Love" (1990 Remix) (from A Kind of Hush) – 3:49
19. "I Won't Last a Day Without You" (from A Song for You) – 4:29
20. "(They Long to Be) Close to You" (1991 Remix) (from Close to You) – 3:40
21. "For All We Know" (Reprise) (from the TV special Tom Jones London Bridge Special) – 0:46

SACD:

1. "Yesterday Once More" (from Now & Then)
2. "We've Only Just Begun" (from Close to You)
3. "Superstar" (from Carpenters)
4. "Rainy Days and Mondays" (from Carpenters)
5. "Goodbye to Love" (from A Song for You)
6. "I Believe You" (from Made in America)
7. "It's Going to Take Some Time" (from A Song for You)
8. "This Masquerade" (from Now & Then)
9. "Ticket to Ride" (from Ticket to Ride)
10. "Top of the World" (from A Song for You)
11. "Only Yesterday" (from Horizon)
12. "Hurting Each Other" (from A Song for You)
13. "Please Mr. Postman" (from Horizon)
14. "Merry Christmas Darling" (from Christmas Portrait)
15. "Sing" (from Now & Then)
16. "Bless The Beasts and Children" (from A Song for You)
17. "I Won't Last a Day Without You" (from A Song for You)
18. "Touch Me When We're Dancing" (from Made in America)
19. "For All We Know" (from Carpenters)
20. "(They Long to Be) Close to You" (from Close to You)
21. "Calling Occupants of Interplanetary Craft" (from Passage)

== Personnel ==
- Bernie Grundman – CD and SACD mastering at Bernie Grundman Mastering

== Charts ==
Chart (2013–2014)	Peak position
Scottish Albums (Official Charts)	53
US Billboard 200	45

Chart (2016–2017)	Peak position
Scottish Albums (Official Charts)	43
UK Albums (Official Charts)	65

== Certifications ==
Region	Certification	Certified units/sales
United Kingdom (BPI)	Gold	100,000^{‡}
^{‡} Sales+streaming figures based on certification alone.
