= Yesterday Once More =

Yesterday Once More may refer to:

- Yesterday Once More (song), by the Carpenters, released 1973
- Yesterday Once More (album), two-disc Carpenters compilation released in 1985
- Yesterday Once More (2004 film), 2004 Hong Kong film
- Yesterday Once More (2016 film), 2016 Chinese film
- Yesterday Once More Tour, a 2016-17 tour by Dami Im
- Yesterday Once More (1985 video / 2002 DVD), containing 15 music videos to Carpenters album with the same name, originally released in VHS/Betamax video formats, repackaged as a DVD titled Carpenters: Gold: Greatest Hits in 2002
