= The Singles: 1974–1978 =

The Singles: 1974-1978

Compilation album by the Carpenters
- Released: 1978
- Recorded: 1972; 1974–1977
- Genre: Pop
- Label: A&M
- Producers: Richard Carpenter except track 2 by Richard and Karen Carpenter and track 4 by Jack Daugherty

The Carpenters chronology
Christmas Portrait (1978)	The Singles: 1974-1978 (1978)	Made in America (1981)

Live/compilation chronology
Live at the Palladium (1976)	The Singles: 1974–1978 (1978)	The Very Best of the Carpenters (1982)

The Singles: 1974–1978 is a compilation album by American pop duo the Carpenters featuring their singles released in the mentioned years.

== Background ==
Two of the included tracks ("Happy" and "Can't Smile Without You") were released as 'B' sides to the singles 'Only Yesterday' and 'Calling Occupants', while one commercial single ("Goofus") was omitted because the song was not released in the UK.

The song "I Won't Last a Day Without You" was originally recorded and released in 1972 on the album A Song for You but was eventually released as a single in 1974 and included on this compilation.

== Release ==
The album was released internationally, reaching #2 on the UK Albums Chart, but the declining popularity of the Carpenters in the U.S. prevented a release in that country.

== Track listing ==
1. "Sweet, Sweet Smile" – 3:00
2. "Jambalaya (On the Bayou)" – 3:41
3. "Can't Smile Without You" – 3:23
4. "I Won't Last a Day Without You" – 3:47
5. "All You Get from Love Is a Love Song" – 3:45
6. "Only Yesterday" – 4:10
7. "Solitaire" – 4:39
8. "Please Mr. Postman" – 2:50
9. "I Need to Be in Love" – 3:31
10. "Happy" – 3:49
11. "There's a Kind of Hush (All Over the World)" – 2:57
12. "Calling Occupants of Interplanetary Craft" – 7:06

== Charts ==
Chart (1978–1979)	Peak position
UK Albums (Official Charts)	2

== Certifications ==
Region	Certification	Certified units/sales
Hong Kong (IFPI Hong Kong)	Platinum	20,000^{*}
United Kingdom (BPI)	Platinum	300,000^{^}
^{*} Sales figures based on certification alone.^{^} Shipments figures based on certification alone.
