= The Poppies (American band) =

American girl group

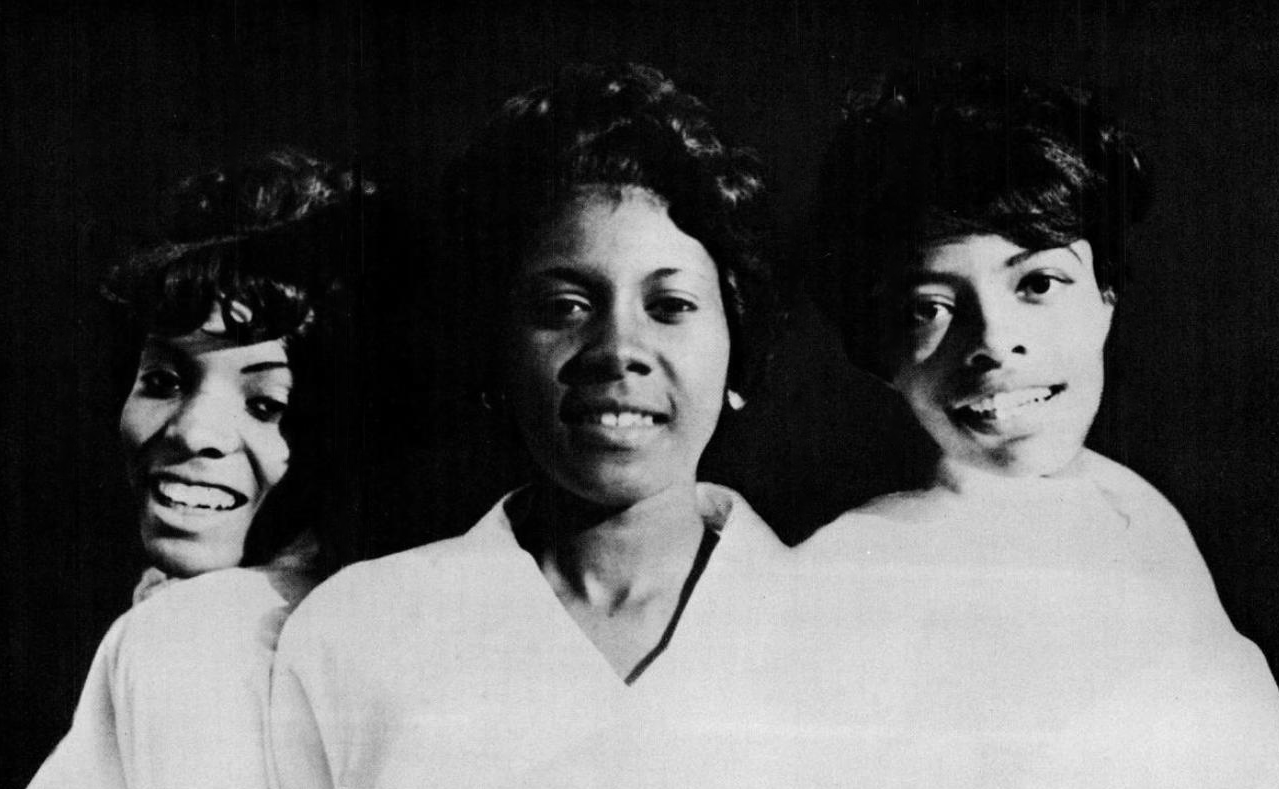
- The Poppies in 1966

Background information
- Origin: Jackson, Mississippi, U.S.
- Genres: R&B, pop
- Years active: 1966–1967
- Label: Epic Records
- Past members: Rosemary Taylor; Dorothy Moore; Petsye McCune

The Poppies were an American 1960s girl group, formed and headed by Dorothy Moore with Petsye McCune and Rosemary Taylor. "Lullaby of Love" was the first 45 single and the group's biggest hit, followed by several more singles including "He's Ready" and "There's a Pain in My Heart."

Moore served as the lead singer for the Poppies. The trio lived in Jackson, Mississippi, United States. They met in nearby Clinton at a recording studio where all three were booked as backing vocalists for other artists such as Irma Thomas and Freddy Fender.

In early 1966, "Lullaby of Love" by the Poppies peaked at number 56 on the pop charts in the United States, and was number 25 in RPM's Canada. An LP of the same title was released on Epic Records, recorded and produced by Billy Sherrill in Nashville. Later that year the group had a smaller hit with "He's Ready" which reached number 106 on the pop chart. Two more singles were released with little notice. The last of their four Epic singles was "There's a Pain in My Heart" which had been included on their album under the title "The Love We Knew" and became a Northern soul classic and was played in UK/Australian clubs.

== Discography ==
=== Studio album ===
- Lullaby of Love (1966)

=== Singles ===
Year	Song	US Pop
1966	"Lullaby of Love"	56
1966	"He's Ready"	106
1966	"He Means So Much to Me"	—
1966	"There's a Pain in My Heart"	—
"—" denotes releases that did not chart.
