= Dorothy Moore =

American blues, gospel, and R&B singer (born 1946)

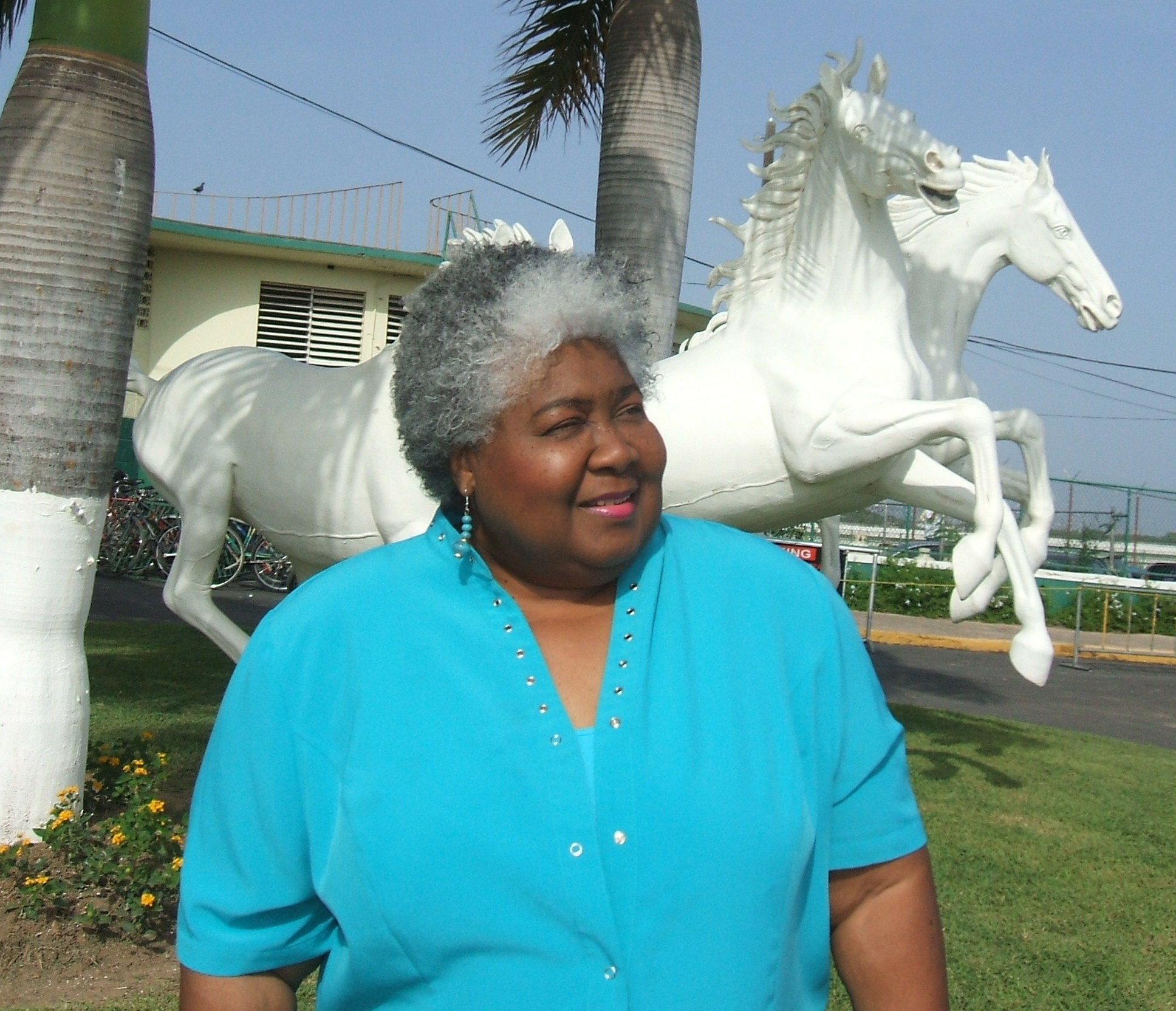
- Moore in 2011

Background information
- Born: October 13, 1946 (age 79); Jackson, Mississippi, U.S.
- Genres: R&B, soul, disco, gospel, blues
- Occupation: Singer
- Instrument: Vocals
- Years active: 1965–present
- Labels: Malaco, Volt, Rejoice, Farish Street

Dorothy Moore (born October 13, 1946) is an American blues, gospel, and R&B singer best known for her 1976 hit song, "Misty Blue".

== Career ==
Moore's parents were Mary Moore and Melvin Hendrex Senior. Her father performed under the stage name Melvin Henderson as a member of the Five Blind Boys of Mississippi. She was raised by her great grandmother and began singing in the church choir at a young age. She was a member of the Poppies with Petsye McCune and Rosemary Taylor when she was attending Jackson State University. The group recorded for Epic Records' Date subsidiary, reaching number 56 on the Billboard Hot 100 chart in 1966 with "Lullaby of Love". Solo singles for the Avco, GSF and Chimneyville labels followed.

Her career took off with several ballads for Malaco Records. "Misty Blue" (1976) reached number 2 on the R&B chart and number 3 on the Billboard Hot 100. "Funny How Time Slips Away" (also 1976) reached number 7 on the R&B chart and number 58 on the pop chart. "I Believe You" was number 5 on the R&B and number 27 on the pop chart in 1977. The album of the same name was rated four and a half out of five stars retrospectively by Bil Carpenter of AllMusic.

After a hiatus, Moore recorded a gospel album, Givin' It Straight to You (1986) for the Rejoice label of Nashville. The album included a cover of "What Is This". She next recorded two albums for Volt Records. She returned to the Malaco label in 1990, for whom she recorded several albums during the ensuing decade and into the new millennium.

Moore has four Grammy Award nominations. Her version of "Misty Blue" appeared on the soundtrack for the 1996 movie Phenomenon, and on the 2005 compilation album, Classic Soul Ballads. Moore serves on the National Advisory Board of the MS Grammy Museum in Cleveland. She has been inducted into the MS Musicians Hall of Fame, Drum Major for Justice MLK Award 2008, Lifetime Achievement Award Monterey Bay Blues Festival, James Brown Heritage Jus' Blues Award 2009, the Blues Foundation Board of Directors Award 2006-2012, nominated for two Blues Music Awards 2013, Mississippi Arts Commission Achievement Award, MS Blues Trail Markers. On June 6, 2015, Moore was inducted into the Official Rhythm & Blues Music Hall of Fame in Clarksdale. Moore continues to sing live at events in and outside of the US in 2018. She was honored with her own blues trail marker on the State of MS Blues Trail in 2022- located on the Jackson State University campus.

== Farish Street Records ==
Moore started the record label Farish Street Records in 2002. The label is named to honor Farish Street, the home to live and juke blues music in the neighborhood where Dorothy was raised.

Moore's albums Please Come Home For Christmas, Gittin' Down Live, I'm Doing Alright and Blues Heart were released on the label.

== Discography ==
=== Albums ===
Year	Title	Chart positions				Label
Year	Title	US	US R&B	US Gospel	AUS	Label
1966	Lullaby of Love (with The Poppies)	—	—	—	—	Epic
1976	Misty Blue	29	10	—	10	Malaco
1977	Dorothy Moore	120	26	—	—	Malaco
1978	Once Moore with Feeling	—	—	—	—	Malaco
1979	Definitely Dorothy	—	—	—	—	Malaco
1980	Talk to Me	—	—	—	—	
1986	I'm Givin' It Straight to You	—	—	23	—	Rejoice
1988	Time Out for Me	—	—	—	—	Volt
1989	Winner	—	—	—	—	Volt
1990	Feel the Love	—	49	—	—	Malaco
1992	Stay Close to Home	—	—	—	—	Malaco
1996	Misty Blue & Other Greatest Hits	—	—	—	—	Malaco
1996	More Moore	—	—	—	—	Malaco
1997	Songs to Love By	—	—	—	—	Malaco
2002	Please Come Home for Christmas	—	—	—	—	Farish Street
2003	Gittin' Down Live!	—	—	—	—	Farish Street
2005	I'm Doing Alright	—	—	—	—	Farish Street
2012	Blues Heart	—	—	—	—	Farish Street
2020	I'm Happy with the One I Got Now	—	—	—	—	Farish Street
"—" denotes releases that did not chart or were not released in that territory.

=== Singles ===
Year	Title	Chart positions								Certifications
Year	Title	US	US AC	US Dance	US R&B	AUS	UK	CAN	CAN AC	Certifications
1973	"Cry Like a Baby"	—	—	—	79	—	—	—	—	
1974	"Don't Let Go"	—	—	—	—	—	—	—	—	
1976	"For Old Time Sake"	—	—	—	53	—	—	—	—	
1976	"Misty Blue"	3	14	—	2	5	5	7	4	BPI: Silver
1976	"Funny How Time Slips Away"	58	46	—	7	—	38	—	71	
1977	"I Believe You"	27	24	—	5	—	20	13	29	
1977	"We Should Really Be in Love" (With Eddie Floyd)	—	—	—	74	—	—	—	—	
1978	"1-2-3 (You and Me)"	—	—	—	93	—	—	—	—	
1978	"Let the Music Play"	—	—	32	50	—	—	—	—	
1978	"Special Occasion"	—	—	—	30	—	—	—	—	
1978	"With Pen in Hand"	101	—	—	12	—	—	—	—	
1979	"(We Need More) Loving Time"	—	—	—	81	—	—	—	—	
1980	"Talk to Me"/"Every Beat in My Heart"	—	—	—	87	—	—	—	—	
1980	"Once or Twice"	—	—	—	—	52	—	—	—	
1982	"Whats Forever For"	—	—	—	90	—	—	—	—	
1984	"Just Another Broken Heart"	—	—	36	—	—	—	—	—	
1991	"All Night Blue"	—	—	—	75	—	—	—	—	
"—" denotes releases that did not chart or were not released in that territory.

== See also ==
- List of soul musicians
- List of disco artists (A-E)
- List of people from Mississippi
- List of performers on Top of the Pops
