= Only Yesterday: The Carpenters Story =

- Directed by: Samantha Peters
- Starring: Richard Carpenter; Jerry Moss
- Music by: Richard Carpenter; Paul Williams; John Bettis; Roger Nichols
- Country of origin: United Kingdom
- Original language: English

Production
- Producer: Mark Cooper
- Running time: 60 minutes

Original release
- Network: BBC One
- Release: 9 April 2007

Related
- Close to You: Remembering the Carpenters

Only Yesterday: The Carpenters Story is an English documentary about American pop-duo the Carpenters that aired on BBC One on April 9, 2007 for the first time. Since then it has been replayed many times on BBC Four.

It features behind the scenes material, childhood pictures, interviews by Richard Carpenter, John Bettis, Herb Alpert and Jerry Moss (co-founders of A&M Records), and others. It was directed by Samantha Peters and contains rare footage of "For All We Know" on The Andy Williams Show (1971); the Dick Carpenter Trio with Karen on drums and lead singing in "Dancing in the Street" on Your All American College Show (1968); "Love Is Surrender" on the London Bridge Special featuring Tom Jones. It was produced in 16:9 widescreen.
