= (Want You) Back in My Life Again =

Single by Carpenters

from the album Made in America
- B-side: "Somebody's Been Lyin'"
- Released: September 1981
- Recorded: 1981
- Studio: A&M (Hollywood, California)
- Genre: Synthpop, new wave, post-disco
- Length: 3:40
- Label: A&M; 1940
- Songwriter: Kerry Chater / Chris Christian
- Producer: Richard Carpenter

Carpenters singles chronology
| "Touch Me When We're Dancing" (1981) | "(Want You) Back in My Life Again" (1981) | "Those Good Old Dreams" (1981) |

"(Want You) Back in My Life Again" is a song by the popular group the Carpenters, the second single off their album Made in America, released in 1981. The song reached #72 on the U.S. Billboard Hot 100. Its B-side was "Somebody's Been Lyin'", another song from the album.

This song also had the synthesizers programmed by Daryl Dragon of Captain and Tennille fame.

== Charts ==
| Chart (1981) | Peak position |
|---|---|
| US Billboard Hot 100 | 72 |
| US Cashbox | 75 |
| US Adult Contemporary (Billboard) | 14 |
