= Gold: Greatest Hits (video) =

Video by Carpenters
- Released: July 1, 1991 (VHS); April 30, 2002 (DVD)
- Recorded: 1970–1982
- Genre: Pop
- Length: 54 minutes
- Label: A&M
- Producer: Richard Carpenter

Carpenters chronology
Gold: Greatest Hits (1991)	Interpretations (1995)

Professional ratings
Review scores
Source	Rating
Amazon	4.5/5 stars

The VHS/Beta Yesterday Once More was released in 1985, shortly after Karen Carpenter's death in 1983. The tape was repackaged as a DVD in 2002 under the name Gold: Greatest Hits, and the DVD contains all the videos from Yesterday Once More.

== Track list ==
No.	Title	Length
1.	"We've Only Just Begun"
2.	"Those Good Old Dreams"
3.	"Superstar"
4.	"Rainy Days and Mondays"
5.	"All You Get from Love Is a Love Song"
6.	"Top of the World"
7.	"Ticket to Ride"
8.	"Only Yesterday"
9.	"Calling Occupants of Interplanetary Craft"
10.	"Beechwood 4-5789"
11.	"Touch Me When We're Dancing"
12.	"Hurting Each Other"
13.	"Please Mr. Postman"
14.	"There's a Kind of Hush (All Over the World)"
15.	"(They Long to Be) Close to You"

== Extra tracks ==
On a Japanese release of the DVD, the promotional video for "I Need to Be in Love" was included.

== Certifications and sales ==
Region	Certification	Certified units/sales
Australia (ARIA)	Gold	7,500^{^}
United Kingdom (BPI) 2002 DVD release	Gold	25,000^{*}
United States (RIAA)	Gold	50,000^{^}
^{*} Sales figures based on certification alone.^{^} Shipments figures based on certification alone.
