= Make Believe It's Your First Time =

1983 single by The Carpenters

"Make Believe It's Your First Time" is a song written by Bob Morrison and Johnny Wilson. Originally recorded by Bobby Vinton, the song was twice recorded by Karen Carpenter, both as a solo act and as a member of the Carpenters.

== Bobby Vinton version ==
Vinton's version was released as a single in late 1979 (backed with "I Remember Loving You") and reached No. 78 on the Billboard Hot 100 and No. 17 on the Adult Contemporary chart. It is Vinton's last Billboard Hot 100 entry to date and the second of two Vinton songs to have crossed over onto the country music singles chart (the other being 1970's "My Elusive Dreams").

== Karen Carpenter versions ==
"Make Believe It's Your First Time"

Single by Carpenters

from the album Voice of the Heart
- B-side: "Look to Your Dreams"
- Released: 1983
- Recorded: 1979–1980
- Studio: A&M (Hollywood, California)
- Genre: Soft pop
- Length: 4:08
- Label: A&M; 1940
- Songwriters: Bob Morrison; Johnny Wilson
- Producer: Richard Carpenter

Carpenters singles chronology
"Beechwood 4-5789" (1982)	"Make Believe It's Your First Time" (1983)	"Your Baby Doesn't Love You Anymore" (1983)

=== Solo rendition ===
Between 1979 and 1980, Karen Carpenter went to New York to record a solo album with Phil Ramone as producer. "Make Believe It's Your First Time" was one of twenty songs recorded and features only a piano, bass and drums as her accompaniment.

This version was ultimately shelved until 1996, with the release of her eponymous album, Karen Carpenter. The song was also released as a single in Japan.

=== Voice of the Heart rendition ===
The Carpenters recorded this version of "Make Believe It's Your First Time" for their 1981 album Made in America. The song, like Karen's solo version, went unreleased in her lifetime and was not included on the album.

After Karen's death in 1983, the song was placed on the Carpenters' next album, Voice of the Heart, and was released as a single. Richard Carpenter's arrangement uses far more instrumentation in comparison to Karen's solo version, adds a bridge written specifically for this version, key modulation during the last chorus, and the inclusion of background vocals.

==== Personnel ====
- Karen Carpenter - lead vocals
- Richard Carpenter - keyboards
- Joe Osborn - bass guitar
- Ron Tutt - drums
- Tony Peluso - electric guitar
- Tim May - acoustic guitar
- Jay Dee Maness - pedal steel guitar
- Sheridon Stokes - flute
- Earle Dumler - oboe
- The O.K. Chorale - backing vocals

== Chart performance ==
=== Bobby Vinton version ===
Chart (1979–1980)	Peak position
US Billboard Hot Country Singles	86
US Billboard Adult Contemporary	17
US Billboard Hot 100	78
US Cashbox	78

=== Carpenters version ===
Chart (1983–1984)	Peak position
Canada RPM Adult Contemporary	2
UK Singles Chart	60
US Bubbling Under Hot 100 (Billboard)	1
US Adult Contemporary (Billboard)	7
Australia (Kent Music Report)	80
Ireland (IRMA)	20

== Other cover versions ==
- "Make Believe It's Your First Time" was also recorded by Dave & Sugar on their 1980 album New York Wine & Tennessee Shine.
