= I Believe You =

1977 single by Dorothy Moore

Single by Dorothy Moore

from the album Dorothy Moore
- B-side: "Love Me"
- Released: July 1977
- Recorded: 1977
- Genre: R&B
- Length: 3:39
- Label: Malaco, Epic (UK), RCA (Japan)
- Songwriters: Don and Dick Addrisi
- Producer: Tommy Couch

Dorothy Moore singles chronology
"Funny How Time Slips Away" (1976)	"I Believe You" (1977)

"I Believe You"

Single by Carpenters

from the album Made in America
- B-side: "B'wana She No Home"
- Released: October 20, 1978
- Recorded: 1978
- Studio: A&M (Hollywood, California)
- Genre: Pop
- Length: 3:54
- Label: A&M; 1940
- Songwriters: Don and Dick Addrisi
- Producer: Richard Carpenter

Carpenters singles chronology
"Sweet, Sweet Smile" (1977)	"I Believe You" (1978)	"Touch Me When We're Dancing" (1981)

"I Believe You" is a love ballad composed by Don and Dick Addrisi which was a 1977 single for Dorothy Moore; taken from her self-titled Dorothy Moore album. "I Believe You" reached #5 R&B and crossed over to the US Pop Top 30 at number 27. The track also reached number 20 in the UK.

== Carpenters cover ==
The song was recorded by the Carpenters and released as a single on October 20, 1978. While it reached number 9 on the Billboard Adult Contemporary chart, it peaked at a disappointing #68 on the Billboard Hot 100, owing significantly to the fact that its accompanying album was delayed indefinitely (it would be three more years until their next album was released), reportedly due to Karen's health issues, although Richard at the time was also dealing with his own addiction to quaaludes.

In June 1981 the album Made in America—which included "I Believe You"—was finally released. The potential success "I Believe You" might have had it been issued in conjunction with an LP was underscored when the album's eventual lead single, "Touch Me When We're Dancing", became the first Carpenters hit to reach the Hot 100's Top 20 as well as number 1 on the Billboard Adult Contemporary chart since "There's a Kind of Hush" did the same in early 1976.

== Personnel ==
- Karen Carpenter – lead and backing vocals
- Richard Carpenter – backing vocals, piano, Fender Rhodes electric piano, celesta, vocal arrangements
- Joe Osborn – bass
- Larrie Londin – drums
- Tim May – acoustic and electric guitars
- Jerry Steinholtz – congas
- Uncredited – bell tree, flute, oboe, shaker, triangle
- Paul Riser – orchestration

== Chart history ==
Dorothy Moore

Chart (1977)	Peak position
Canada RPM Top Singles	29
Canada RPM Adult Contemporary	13
UK (OCC)	20
US Billboard Hot 100	27
US Billboard R&B	5
US Billboard Adult Contemporary	24
US Cash Box Top 100	28

The Carpenters

Chart (1978)	Peak position
Canadian RPM Top Singles	81
Canada RPM Adult Contemporary	22
US Billboard Hot 100	68
US Adult Contemporary (Billboard)	9
US Cash Box Top 100	70

== Other cover versions ==
- "I Believe You" was also featured on the 1978 album Moods by Barbara Mandrell.
