= Made in America (The Carpenters album) =

Studio album by the Carpenters
- Released: June 16, 1981
- Recorded: 1978–1981
- Studios: A&M Studios, Los Angeles; mixed at Sound Labs and A&M Studios, Los Angeles
- Genres: Pop, adult contemporary
- Length: 40:22
- Label: A&M
- Producer: Richard Carpenter

The Carpenters chronology
The Singles: 1974–1978 (1978)	Made in America (1981)	Voice of the Heart (1983)

Singles from Made in America
- 1. "I Believe You" Released: June 1978; 2. "Touch Me When We're Dancing" Released: June 19, 1981; 3. "(Want You) Back in My Life Again" Released: September 1981; 4. "Those Good Old Dreams" Released: December 1981; 5. "Beechwood 4-5789" Released: January 1982

Professional ratings
Review scores
Source	Rating
AllMusic	3/5 stars
The Rolling Stone Album Guide	1.5/5 stars

Made in America is the tenth studio album by the American music duo the Carpenters, released in June 1981. Karen Carpenter died less than two years later, making it their final album released in her lifetime. It reached number 52 in the US and number 12 in the UK.

Karen played drums in the studio for the first time since Horizon, on the song "When It's Gone (It's Just Gone)", albeit in unison with veteran Nashville session drummer Larrie Londin, and she also played percussion on "Those Good Old Dreams" in tandem with Paulinho da Costa.

The album yielded their last Billboard Hot 100 Top 40 hit, "Touch Me When We're Dancing", which peaked at #16. The album's other four singles, "I Believe You," "(Want You) Back In My Life Again," "Those Good Old Dreams," and "Beechwood 4-5789," were only minor hits, peaking at #68, #72, #63, and #74 respectively.

In 1985, Richard Carpenter said "that was Karen's favorite album and is mine, out of all our projects".

== Promotion ==
To promote Made in America, Karen and Richard Carpenter appeared on several talk shows in 1981, including America's Top Ten on July 11, The Merv Griffin Show on October 2 performing "(Want You) Back in My Life Again", and Good Morning America on October 12.

== Reception ==
Billboard stated that "the duo returns here to the mellow MOR-pop which has brought it 18 gold singles and albums since 1970. The LP is an about-face from the duo's last studio collection, 1977's Passage, which flirted with rock rhythms and failed to be certified gold. Included are pretty ballads by Burt Bacharach and Roger Nichols, who composed the pair's first two hits, "Close To You" and "We've Only Just Begun." The duo also returns to the Marvelettes' songbag, which brought its most recent gold single, "Please Mr. Postman," for "Beechwood 4- 5789." Daryl Dragon of the Captain & Tenille, once the Carpenters' chief rival for the MOR crown, contributes the synthesizer programming to "(Want You) Back In My Life Again," a punchy, midtempo Doobie-esque rocker which would be a strong second single."

In their review, Cashbox noted that "America's favorite brother and sister team of a few years back is in fine fettle after a long hiatus from the studio. Don't expect a massive directional change from the "Close To You" days, though. Richard Carpenter's production is clean and modern, but the duo's strength remains its sprite, floating harmonies and A/C pop stylings. Karen and Richard's material here should fare well with adult contemporary and pop programmers considering the current American fervor for middle of the road acts."

Bruce Eder of AllMusic called it "very much a comeback effort, with a fair amount of energy on most of it, newly radiant arrangements ("The Wedding Song," etc.), one cute oldie cover ("Beechwood 4-5789," which was made into a video), and the best new songs they'd had since the mid-'70s ("Those Good Old Dreams," "Touch Me When We're Dancing")...the album as a whole was more energetic and memorable than anything they'd done since A Song for You."

== Track listing ==
Side one
No.	Title	Writer(s)	Length
1.	"Those Good Old Dreams"	John Bettis; Richard Carpenter	4:12
2.	"Strength of a Woman"	Phyllis Brown; Juanita Curiel	3:59
3.	"(Want You) Back in My Life Again"	Kerry Chater; Chris Christian	3:40
4.	"When You've Got What It Takes"	Bill Lane; Roger Nichols	3:41
5.	"Somebody's Been Lyin'"	Burt Bacharach; Carole Bayer Sager	4:25

Side two
No.	Title	Writer(s)	Length
6.	"I Believe You"	Dick Addrisi; Don Addrisi	3:54
7.	"Touch Me When We're Dancing"	Kenny Bell; Terry Skinner; Jerry Lee Wallace	3:19
8.	"When It's Gone (It's Just Gone)"	Randy Handley	5:01
9.	"Beechwood 4-5789"	Marvin Gaye; George Gordy; William "Mickey" Stevenson	3:06
10.	"Because We Are in Love (The Wedding Song)"	Bettis; Carpenter	5:04

== Personnel ==
- Karen Carpenter – lead and backing vocals; drums (8), percussion (1, 8)
- Richard Carpenter – backing vocals, keyboards, synthesizers, arrangements, orchestrations
- Tim May – electric guitar (1–3, 6–8), acoustic guitar (1, 3–7, 10)
- Tony Peluso – electric guitar (2–4, 7, 8), acoustic guitar (7)
- Dennis Budimir, Fred Tackett – acoustic guitar (7)
- JayDee Maness – pedal steel guitar (1, 8)
- Joe Osborn – bass guitar
- Tom Scott– tenor saxophone (3, 7, 9)
- Bob Conti – percussion (8)
- Paulinho da Costa – percussion (1–4, 7)
- Peter Limonick – percussion (5, 10)
- Jerry Steinholtz – congas (6)
- Earle Dumler – oboe (2, 4, 5, 7, 8)
- Gayle Levant – harp (1, 2, 4, 5, 7, 9, 10)
- Larrie Londin – drums (2, 6–8)
- Ron Tutt – drums (1–3, 5, 9, 10)
- John "JR" Robinson – drums (4)
- Carolyn Dennis – background vocal (2, 7)
- Stephanie Spruill, Maxine Waters Willard – background vocal (2)
- The O.K. Chorale – backing vocals (10)
- Ron Hicklin – coral director (10)
- Frank Pooler – coral conductor (10)
- Jimmy Getzoff – concert master (1–4, 6–9)
- Gerald Vinci – concert master (5, 10)
- Peter Knight – orchestration (5, 10)
- Paul Riser – orchestration (6)
- Daryl Dragon, Ian Underwood – synthesizer programming (3)

=== Production ===
- Richard Carpenter – producer
- Roger Young – engineer, mixer
- Ray Gerhardt – engineer
- Dave Iveland – additional engineer
- Stewart Whitmore – mixing assistant
- Bernie Grundman – mastering engineer
- Chuck Beeson – art direction
- Jeff Ayeroff – art direction
- Lynn Robb – design
- David Willardson – illustration
- John Engstead – photography
- Bernie Grundman, Richard Carpenter – remastering at Bernie Grundman Mastering

== Charts ==
Chart (1981)	Peak position
Australian Albums (Kent Music Report)	50
Japanese Albums (Oricon)	44
UK Albums (Official Charts)	12
US Billboard 200	52
US Cash Box Top 200 Albums	66

== Certifications ==
Region	Certification	Certified units/sales
United Kingdom (BPI)	Silver	60,000^{^}
^{^} Shipments figures based on certification alone.
