= We've Only Just Begun =

1970 single by the Carpenters

- Artwork for U.S. vinyl single

Single by Carpenters

from the album Close to You
- B-side: "All of My Life"
- Released: August 21, 1970
- Recorded: 1970
- Genre: Soft rock
- Length: 3:05
- Label: A&M
- Songwriters: Paul Williams; Roger Nichols
- Producer: Jack Daugherty

Carpenters singles chronology
"(They Long to Be) Close to You" (1970)	"We've Only Just Begun" (1970)	"Merry Christmas Darling" (1970)

"We've Only Just Begun" is a song by American sibling duo the Carpenters. It was released on August 21, 1970 through A&M Records as the second single from their second album, Close to You (1970). It was originally conceived by Paul Williams and Roger Nichols for a television commercial, which the Carpenters saw and sought to record; it was produced by Jack Daugherty. It is a soft rock song with lyrics about continuing the journey of life.

"We've Only Just Begun" was released to immediate success, reaching number 2 on the Billboard Hot 100 and topping four other charts; it was nominated at the Grammy Awards for Song of the Year and Best Contemporary Song. The song boosted the success of Close to You and was acclaimed for its composition, production, and Karen Carpenter's vocals.

"We've Only Just Begun" is an enduring work by the Carpenters, being inducted into the Grammy Hall of Fame in 1998 and included in several all-time lists.

== Background ==
The origins of "We've Only Just Begun" can be traced back to a 1970 television commercial for Crocker-Citizens National Bank in California. Facing challenges with name recognition and competition, the bank sought to connect with young customers starting their adult lives. Hal Riney, a creative force at the advertising agency Hal Riney & Partners, envisioned a new kind of commercial – one that told a story through music, rather than selling a product directly. Riney's team provided songwriters Paul Williams and Roger Nichols with the slogan, "You've got a long way to go. We'd like to help you get there," and explained that the commercial would highlight a couple's wedding and their journey ahead.

Williams and Nichols wrote the song in a single afternoon, matching the warmth and optimism Riney wanted. The resulting ad – set to wedding visuals and Williams' heartfelt vocal – intentionally left out direct references to the bank, making the message universal. The commercial was an immediate hit: it resonated with younger customers, boosted brand recognition, and even led to a surge in requests to use the song for weddings and graduations. The unique approach of focusing on storytelling and customer experience, rather than bank products, helped set a new standard for advertising in the industry. However, the campaign ultimately attracted mostly young adults who did not yet have sufficient collateral for loans, which was not the bank's primary target demographic. As a result, Crocker-Citizens National Bank discontinued the commercial despite its popularity, though its impact on advertising and music endured.

== Recording ==
Before becoming a Carpenters classic, "We've Only Just Begun" was recorded by Smokey Roberds, a friend of Nichols, under the pseudonym "Freddie Allen". It was released in March 1970 but did not get significant airplay. Richard Carpenter saw the commercial on television and immediately recognized Paul Williams' distinctive voice. Curious about the possibility of a full-length version, Carpenter approached Williams and Roger Nichols at A&M Records, where both parties were under contract, to ask if the song extended beyond what was featured in the ad. The TV version consisted of two verses with no bridge, but Williams assured Carpenter that a fuller version of the song had already been written, which was not true.

According to Williams in the documentary Close to You: Remembering The Carpenters "We'd had some success with songs before, a few album cuts and some B-sides – but no singles. This was a major break, a chance to get an A-side and maybe even a hit, so we would have absolutely lied through our teeth if there wasn't a full song."

Williams recorded his own version of the full song for his 1971 album Just an Old Fashioned Love Song.

== Music video ==
The music video for the song was shot on a red stage featuring large yellow and white letters spelling the word "you". Karen wears a white granny dress while she sits and sings in the hanging letter "U". Richard stands beside her singing in a pink shirt and white suit. Four other musicians are near the "O", two with guitars and two with tambourines. The video was shot as part of the 1971 television series Make Your Own Kind of Music.

== Reception and legacy ==
The Carpenters' rendition, featuring Karen Carpenter's lead vocals and the siblings' combined harmonies, was an immediate success upon its release in August 1970, three months after their hit "(They Long to Be) Close to You" was released. It became the group's second consecutive Top 10 single, peaking at No. 2 on the Billboard Hot 100 and No. 1 on the Cash Box single chart. It spent seven weeks as the top song on the Adult Contemporary chart. Cash Box described the song as having "delicious lyrics and a sparkling production."

Although it achieved only moderate success on the UK Singles Chart, peaking at No. 28, the enduring charm of "We've Only Just Begun" ensured its legacy. UK listeners voted it the second-most loved Carpenters song in ITV's 2016 program The Nation's Favourite Carpenters Song. For Williams and Nichols, the song represented a breakthrough, solidifying their careers as a songwriting team.

The Carpenters' version helped them gain Grammy wins for Best New Artist and Best Contemporary Performance by a Duo or Group for their album Close to You in 1971. In 1998, the song was inducted into the Grammy Hall of Fame in recognition of its lasting historical and cultural significance. In 2011, it was included on Rolling Stone's list of "The 500 Greatest Songs of All Time."

== Charts ==
=== Weekly charts ===
Chart (1970–71)	Peak position
Australia	6
Canada RPM Top Singles	1
Canada RPM Adult Contemporary	1
Japan	71
Quebec (ADISQ)	4
UK Singles (Official Charts)	28
US Billboard Hot 100	2
US Adult Contemporary (Billboard)	1
US Cash Box Top 100	1
US Cash Box Radio Active Airplay Singles	3

=== Year-end charts ===
Chart (1970)	Rank
Australia	90
US Billboard Hot 100	65
US Cash Box Top 100	57
Canada	16

== Certifications ==
Region	Certification	Certified units/sales
United Kingdom (BPI)	Silver	200,000^{‡}
United States (RIAA)	Gold	1,000,000^{^}
^{^} Shipments figures based on certification alone.^{‡} Sales+streaming figures based on certification alone.

== Personnel ==
- Karen Carpenter – lead and backing vocals
- Richard Carpenter – co-lead & backing vocals, piano, Wurlitzer electronic piano, orchestration
- Joe Osborn – bass
- Hal Blaine – drums
- Doug Strawn – clarinet
- Bob Messenger – woodwinds
- Jim Horn – woodwinds
- Uncredited – tambourine, trumpets

== Carpenters compilation appearances ==
- 1973 – The Singles: 1969–1973 (1973 remix with intro)
- 1980 – Beautiful Moments
- 1985 – Yesterday Once More: Their Greatest Hits (1985 remix)
- 1989 – Anthology
- 1991 – From the Top (1991 remix)
- 1995 – Interpretations: A 25th Anniversary Edition
- 1997 – Carpenters: Their Greatest Hits And Finest Performances
- 1998 – Love Songs
- 2000 – The Singles: 1969-1981
- 2002 – The Essential Collection
- 2004 – Gold: 35th Anniversary Edition
- 2009 – 40/40
- 2014 – Icon (as part of Universal Music's budget line compilation series)

== Paul Williams version ==
Paul Williams, who had originally composed the song's lyrics, released a version of the song in 1971 on his album Just an Old Fashioned Love Song. It was also released as a single, with "Waking Up Alone" as the B-side. The 1971 version was a different recording from the version he had recorded for the original Crocker Bank commercial.

== Bitty McLean version ==
- Bitty McLean released a version as a single on June 5, 1995, which reached No. 23 on the UK Singles Chart.

== See also ==
- List of number-one adult contemporary singles of 1970 (U.S.)
- R. Coleman: The Carpenters: the Untold Story (New York, 1995)
