= Sweet, Sweet Smile =

Single by Carpenters

from the album Passage
- B-side: "I Have You"
- Released: February 18, 1978
- Recorded: 1977
- Genre: Country pop
- Length: 3:01
- Label: A&M
- Songwriters: Otha Young; Juice Newton
- Producers: Richard and Karen Carpenter

Carpenters singles chronology
| "The Christmas Song (Chestnuts Roasting on an Open Fire)" (1977) | "Sweet, Sweet Smile" (1978) | "I Believe You" (1978) |

"Sweet, Sweet Smile" is a country and western song composed by Otha Young and Juice Newton introduced by the Carpenters on their 1977 album Passage.

== Background ==
"Sweet, Sweet Smile" is one of the few songs recorded by the Carpenters which was chosen by Karen Carpenter rather than Richard Carpenter.

Juice Newton and her bandleader Otha Young had written "Sweet, Sweet Smile" for Newton herself to record but Newton's label Capitol Records was not interested in the song. Newton's manager, a friend of the Carpenters, was playing the demo of "Sweet, Sweet Smile" at his home while Karen Carpenter was visiting. Karen Carpenter liked the song and brought it to the attention of her brother Richard Carpenter who'd recall: "I liked it immediately...now there's one that, to me, should have done better than it did" referring to the track's January 1978 release as the third single from Passage. Richard Carpenter would acknowledge the Carpenters' career decline: "I think if someone else had done ['Sweet, Sweet Smile'] at that time, it would have been a bigger hit."

"Sweet, Sweet Smile" fell short of the Top 40 with a #44 peak on the Billboard Hot 100 but gave the Carpenters the sole C&W chart hit of their career rising as high as #8 C&W; on the Billboard Easy Listening chart "Sweet, Sweet Smile" reached #7.

== Other versions ==
A translation of "Sweet, Sweet Smile": "Der Mann auf einem Seil", served as the B-side of Wencke Myhre's 1978 German hit "Lass mein Knie, Joe" ("It's a Heartache") (#16). A Finnish rendering: "Sä Oot Niin Kultainen", was recorded by Lea Laven for her 1978 album Aamulla rakkaani näin.

In 2011, Juice Newton released her own, newly recorded version of "Sweet, Sweet Smile" as a bonus track on her The Ultimate Hits Collection album.

== Chart performance ==
| Chart (1978) | Peak position |
|---|---|
| US Billboard Hot 100 | 44 |
| US Adult Contemporary (Billboard) | 7 |
| US Billboard Hot Country Singles | 8 |
| Canadian Singles Chart | 33 |
| Canada RPM Adult Contemporary | 7 |
| Canadian RPM Country Tracks | 6 |
| Oricon (Japanese) Singles Chart | 59 |
| UK Singles Chart | 40 |
| Australia (Kent Music Report) | 100 |
| US Cash Box Top 100 | 42 |
| West Germany (GfK) | 22 |
