= Those Good Old Dreams =

Single by Carpenters

from the album Made in America
- B-side: "When It's Gone (It's Just Gone)"
- Released: December 1981
- Recorded: 1981
- Studio: A&M Studios (Los Angeles, CA)
- Genre: Pop, Country
- Length: 4:12
- Label: A&M; 1940
- Songwriter: Richard Carpenter / John Bettis
- Producer: Richard Carpenter

Carpenters singles chronology
"(Want You) Back in My Life Again" (1981)	"Those Good Old Dreams" (1981)	"Beechwood 4-5789" (1981)

"Those Good Old Dreams" is a song by The Carpenters. Its B-side is "When It's Gone (It's Just Gone)", a song released on the Made in America album in 1981.

The song talks of reliving dreams and feelings of romantic love held long ago ("It's a new day for those good old dreams / One by one it seems they're coming true").

== Personnel ==
- Karen Carpenter – lead and backing vocals, percussion
- Richard Carpenter – backing vocals, keyboards, arrangements
- Joe Osborn – bass
- Ron Tutt – drums
- Paulinho da Costa – percussion
- Tim May – acoustic and electric guitars
- JayDee Maness – pedal steel guitar
- Gayle Levant – harp
- Jimmy Getzoff – concertmaster

== Charts ==
Chart (1981–82)	Peak position
Canada RPM Adult Contemporary	9
Quebec (ADISQ)	38
US Cashbox	78
US Billboard Hot 100	63
US Adult Contemporary (Billboard)	21

== Music video ==
There was a music video shot for this song in 1981. The video is featured on the Carpenters Gold video collection. Footage of their vinyl record Made in America being manufactured at the A&M Records warehouse is shown at the beginning. Karen singing and Richard playing the piano in a room with colorful, empty picture frames is shown during the verses and the final part of the song; during the choruses, a montage of black-and-white childhood photos of Karen and Richard is displayed.

The yellow pant suit that Karen wore in this video would later be worn by the actress Cynthia Gibb when she starred in the title role of the 1989 film The Karen Carpenter Story.
