= Touch Me When We're Dancing =

1979 single by Bama

Single by Bama

from the album Touch Me When We're Dancing
- B-side: "Turning The Tables"
- Released: 1979
- Genre: Pop
- Length: 3:36
- Label: Free Flight
- Songwriters: Ken Bell; Terry Skinner; J. L. Wallace
- Producer: Jim Vienneau

"Touch Me When We're Dancing" is a song written by Terry Skinner, J. L. Wallace and Ken Bell. Skinner and Wallace headed the Muscle Shoals, Alabama session group Bama, who first recorded this song and released it as a single in 1979 reaching number 42 on the Billboard Easy Listening chart and number 86 on the Billboard Hot 100 chart. The song was later recorded by The Carpenters in 1981 for their Made in America album. In 1984, it was recorded by country music artists Mickey Gilley and Charly McClain for their 1984 duet album It Takes Believers and in 1986 by the country music group Alabama.

== Bama version ==
The version by Bama was produced by Jim Vienneau and released on the Free Flight label. It received a positive review in Billboard which praised the "smooth production" and said that the song "allows the group to achieve a strong identity".

== Charts ==
=== Weekly charts ===
Chart (1979)	Peak position
US Cashbox	93
US Billboard Bubbling Under the Hot 100	109
US Billboard Hot 100	86
US Billboard Adult Contemporary	49

== Carpenters' version ==
"Touch Me When We're Dancing"
- Touch Me When We're Dancing resembles the "Made in America" cover.

Single by Carpenters

from the album Made in America
- B-side: "Because We Are in Love (The Wedding Song)"
- Released: June 19, 1981
- Recorded: June 15, 1980
- Studio: A&M (Hollywood, California)
- Genre: Pop
- Length: 3:19
- Label: A&M; 2344
- Songwriters: Ken Bell, Terry Skinner and J. L. Wallace
- Producer: Richard Carpenter

Carpenters singles chronology
"I Believe You" (1978)	"Touch Me When We're Dancing" (1981)	"(Want You) Back in My Life Again" (1981)

The Carpenters' version of "Touch Me When We're Dancing" was released on their Made in America album in the summer of 1981. Placing at number 16 on the Billboard Hot 100, it was the last of their singles to reach the Top 40 after not having a song appear on that chart for over three years. It was also their fifteenth (and final) number-one song on the adult contemporary chart. The B-side, "Because We Are in Love", was played at Karen Carpenter's wedding to Thomas Burris on August 31, 1980.

=== Music video ===
The video for "Touch Me When Were Dancing" can be found on The Carpenters video collection Gold. The video consists of Karen Carpenter singing and slowly dancing by her brother Richard Carpenter's piano. Footage of a couple dancing is superimposed onto Richard's black piano, as is a view from behind Richard of his hands as he plays. In the background are the guitar player and the drummer.

=== Charts ===
==== Weekly charts ====
Chart (1981)	Peak position
Canada RPM Adult Contemporary	4
Quebec (ADISQ)	13
US Cashbox	17
US Cashbox Radio Active Airplay Singles	17
US Billboard Hot 100	16
US Adult Contemporary (Billboard)	1
New Zealand (RIANZ)	22
Australia (Kent Music Report)	78

==== Year-end charts ====
Chart (1981)	Position
US Adult Contemporary (Billboard)	15

== Personnel ==
- Karen Carpenter – lead and backing vocals
- Richard Carpenter – backing vocals, Fender Rhodes electric piano, piano, orchestration
- Joe Osborn – bass
- Tony Peluso – acoustic and electric guitars
- Tim May – acoustic and electric guitars
- Larrie Londin – drums
- Paulinho da Costa – wind chimes, cabasa, shaker, tambourine, cowbell
- Tom Scott – tenor saxophone
- Earl Dumler – oboe
- Carolyn Dennis – backing vocals

== Alabama version ==
"Touch Me When We're Dancing"

Single by Alabama

from the album The Touch
- B-side: "Hanging Up My Travlin' Shoes"
- Released: September 12, 1986
- Genre: Country
- Length: 3:43
- Label: RCA Nashville
- Songwriters: Ken Bell, Terry Skinner and J. L. Wallace
- Producers: Harold Shedd and Alabama

Alabama singles chronology
"She and I" (1985)	"Touch Me When We're Dancing" (1986)	"Deep River Woman" (1986)

Music video
- "Touch Me When We're Dancing" at CMT.com

The Alabama version was released in September 1986 as the first single from the album The Touch. It went on to become a number one hit on Billboard's Hot Country Songs chart later that year, their 20th straight chart-topper in a string that dated back to 1980.

=== Music video ===
A music video was made for the song, and was directed by Marc Ball.

=== Chart positions ===
Chart (1986)	Peak position
US Hot Country Songs (Billboard)	1
Canadian RPM Country Tracks	1
