= Sing (Sesame Street song) =

1971 song written by Joe Raposo

"Sing" is a 1971 song written by Joe Raposo for the children's television show Sesame Street as its signature song.

Raposo was a staff songwriter for Sesame Street, and the song became one of the most popular on the program, sung in English, Spanish and American Sign Language. In its initial appearance, it was sung by the show's adult human cast members and the Muppets, including Big Bird.

Barbra Streisand's 1972 version of the song was released as a single, reaching number 28 on the Easy Listening chart.

In 1973, it gained popularity when performed by the Carpenters, a number 3 hit on the Billboard Hot 100.

== Barbra Streisand medley ==
In 1972 Barbra Streisand recorded "Make Your Own Kind of Music" in a medley with "Sing," which became a number 28 hit on the Billboard Easy Listening chart and appeared at number 94 on the Billboard Hot 100.

== The Carpenters' versions ==
"Sing"
- Cover to the single, "Sing"

Single by Carpenters

from the album Now & Then
- B-side: "Druscilla Penny"
- Released: January 13, 1973
- Recorded: 1972
- Genre: Children's music; pop
- Length: 3:18
- Label: A&M
- Songwriter: Joe Raposo
- Producers: Richard Carpenter, Karen Carpenter

Carpenters singles chronology
"Goodbye to Love" (1972)	"Sing" (1973)	"Yesterday Once More" (1973)

Now & Then track listing
- 7 tracks Side one: 1. "Sing"; 2. "This Masquerade"; 3. "Heather"; 4. "Jambalaya (On the Bayou)"; 5. "I Can't Make Music"; Side two: 1. "Yesterday Once More"; 1. "Fun, Fun, Fun"; 2. "The End of the World"; 3. "Da Doo Ron Ron (When He Walked Me Home)"; 4. "Dead Man's Curve"; 5. "Johnny Angel"; 6. "The Night Has a Thousand Eyes"; 7. "Our Day Will Come"; 8. "One Fine Day"; 2. "Yesterday Once More (Reprise)"

Although Barbra Streisand had an easy-listening hit in 1972 with "Sing", Karen and Richard Carpenter heard the song for the first time as guests on the ABC television special Robert Young with the Young in 1973. They loved the song and felt that it could be a hit. It appeared as the debut single on the group's 1973 album Now & Then. It reached #3 on the Billboard Hot 100 chart and #1 on the Billboard Easy Listening chart, and it became the group's seventh gold single. It also became Carpenters' eighth top-ten single in the Billboard Hot 100. On the New Zealand Listener charts it reached #7.

The Carpenters' recording was produced and arranged by Richard Carpenter and engineered by Ray Gerhardt. Karen Carpenter sang lead vocals, with backing vocals by herself, Richard and the Jimmy Joyce Children's Choir. Keyboards were played by Richard, bass by Joe Osborn, drums by Karen and recorders by Tom Scott.

In 1974 while touring Japan, the Carpenters recorded their first live album in Osaka. It contained a new version of the song with the children's chorus sung by the Kyoto Children's Choir. It is featured on the album Live in Japan, recorded in June 1974 and released in Japan only on March 7, 1975. The album has since been released on CD.

The 1991 box set From the Top contains a bilingual version of the song; the title is listed as "Canta/Sing," and the song is sung with alternating Spanish and English lines. The Mexican single version contains full Spanish lyrics except for the refrain.

A new recording and remix of Carpenters' version was created in 1994 by sound engineer Roger Young and first released on Interpretations: A 25th Anniversary Celebration.

=== Personnel ===
- Karen Carpenter – lead and backing vocals, drums
- Richard Carpenter – backing vocals, piano, Wurlitzer electronic piano, celesta, orchestration
- Joe Osborn – bass
- Tom Scott – recorders
- The Jimmy Joyce Children's Choir – backing vocals
- Doug Strawn - triangle, tambourine

=== Chart performance ===
==== Weekly charts ====
Chart (1973)	Peak position
Australia	24
Canadian RPM Top Singles	4
Canada RPM Adult Contemporary	5
France (IFOP)	21
Japan (Oricon International Singles Chart)	1
Japan (Oricon Singles Chart)	18
New Zealand (Listener)	7
Quebec (ADISQ)	4
US Billboard Hot 100	3
US Adult Contemporary (Billboard)	1
US Cash Box Top 100	5
US Cashbox Radio Active Airplay Singles	1
US Record World	4

==== Year-end charts ====
Chart (1973)	Rank
Canada	52
US Billboard Hot 100	59
US Cash Box	42

== Subsequent Sesame Street versions ==
Lily Tomlin sang and signed the song in ASL to a group of deaf children on Sesame Street in 1975. The same year, she played the mother of two deaf children in Robert Altman's film Nashville, and they sang the song in the film. In 1976, on the 11th episode of The Muppet Show, guest Lena Horne sang the song. Alaina Reed (as Olivia) sang it while Linda Bove (as Linda) signed the lyrics on Sesame Street. Many other versions have been performed.

The original and subsequent Sesame Street recordings were released on Sesame Street Concert/On Stage – Live! (1973), Sing the Hit Songs of Sesame Street (1974), Bert & Ernie Sing-Along (1975), Sesame Street Silver – 10th Anniversary Album (1978), Sesame Street Disco (1979), Sing: Songs of Joe Raposo (1992), Sesame Street Platinum: All Time Favorites (1995), The Bird Is the Word – Big Bird's Favorite Songs, Songs from the Street: 35 Years of Music (2003) and The Best of Elmo. A Spanish version was included in Fiesta Songs! (1998).

== See also ==
- List of number-one adult contemporary singles of 1973 (U.S.)
