= Superstar (Delaney and Bonnie song) =

1969 single by Delaney & Bonnie

Single by Delaney & Bonnie

from the album D&B Together
- A-side: "Comin' Home"
- Released: December 1969
- Recorded: September 27 – October 10, 1969
- Studio: A&M Studios, Los Angeles
- Genre: Adult contemporary; pop rock; soft rock
- Label: Atco (US); Atlantic (other territories)
- Songwriters: Bonnie Bramlett; Leon Russell

"Superstar" is a 1969 song written by Bonnie Bramlett and Leon Russell that has been a hit for many artists in different genres in the years since. The best-known versions are by the Carpenters in 1971, Luther Vandross in 1983, and Sonic Youth (as a tribute to the Carpenters) in 1994.

== Original Delaney and Bonnie version ==
Rita Coolidge came up with the song idea, based on observing the relationships of female groupies with rock stars in the late 1960s.

In its first recorded incarnation, the song was called "Groupie (Superstar)", and was released in December 1969 as the B-side of the Delaney and Bonnie single "Comin' Home". Released by Atco Records in the United States and Atlantic Records in the rest of the world, the full credit on the single was "Delaney and Bonnie and Friends featuring Eric Clapton."

"Comin' Home" reached number 84 on the US pop singles chart, although it achieved a peak of 16 on the UK Singles Chart.

The original version of "Superstar" finally surfaced in 1972, when the album D&B Together was released, shortly before Delaney and Bonnie's marriage and collaboration ended. That version was also included as a bonus track on a 2006 reissue of the 1970 album, Eric Clapton.

Bonnie Bramlett later rerecorded the song on her 2002 solo album, I'm Still the Same. Using the better-known shortened "Superstar" title, she rendered it as a very slow, piano-based torch song.

=== Personnel ===
(Taken from the liner notes of the 2006 Deluxe Edition of the Eric Clapton album):

- Delaney Bramlett - rhythm guitar and vocals
- Bonnie Bramlett - vocals
- Eric Clapton - lead guitar
- Dave Mason - guitar
- Bobby Whitlock - organ
- Carl Radle - bass
- Jim Gordon - drums
- Jim Price - trumpet
- Bobby Keys - tenor sax
- Tex Johnson - percussion
- Rita Coolidge - vocals

Produced by Delaney Bramlett, recorded at A&M Studios, Los Angeles, September 27 – October 10, 1969.

== Carpenters version ==
"Superstar"
- Picture sleeve for U.S. vinyl single

Single by Carpenters

from the album Carpenters
- B-side: "Bless the Beasts and Children"
- Released: August 12, 1971
- Recorded: February 1971
- Genre: Pop; soft rock
- Length: 3:46
- Label: A&M
- Songwriters: Leon Russell; Bonnie Bramlett
- Producer: Jack Daugherty

Carpenters singles chronology
"Rainy Days and Mondays" (1971)	"Superstar" (1971)	"Bless the Beasts and Children" (1971)

Music video
- "Superstar" on YouTube

"Superstar" became most popular after its treatment by the Carpenters. Richard Carpenter became aware of the song after watching Bette Midler sing it on the February 15, 1971, edition of The Tonight Show with Johnny Carson.

Produced by Richard Carpenter with Jack Daugherty, it was recorded using members of the Wrecking Crew, a famed collection of Los Angeles-area session musicians. Because the original subject matter of the song was more risqué than was typical for the Carpenters, Richard changed a lyric in the second verse from "And I can hardly wait/To sleep with you again" to the less suggestive "And I can hardly wait/To be with you again." The track was finished in one take.

Karen Carpenter's vocal was praised for its intensity and emotional nature. David Hepworth commented: "Even with only half her mind on the job, she delivered a perfect performance. The guide vocal never needed to be replaced."

The duo's rendition was included on the May 1971 album Carpenters, and then released as a single in August 1971, rising to number two on the Billboard Hot 100 pop singles chart, held out of the top spot by Rod Stewart's "Maggie May". It also became the Carpenters' fifth consecutive top-five single in the Billboard Hot 100. It spent two weeks at number one on the Easy Listening chart that autumn, earning gold record status. It reached number 18 on the UK Singles chart and charted in Australia and New Zealand as well.

Richard was nominated for a Grammy Award for Best Arrangement Accompanying Vocalist for the song. "Superstar" would go on to appear on two mid-1970s Carpenters live albums as well as on many compilation albums, including the 2004 SACD compilation The Singles: 1969–1981 (not to be confused with the regular CD, The Singles: 1969–1981) as a remix of the original 1973 mix on the similarly titled compilation The Singles: 1969–1973.

=== Personnel ===
- Karen Carpenter – lead and backing vocals
- Richard Carpenter – backing vocals, piano, Wurlitzer electric piano, Fender Rhodes electric piano, orchestration
- Joe Osborn – bass guitar
- Hal Blaine – drums
- Earle Dumler – oboe

=== Chart performance ===
Weekly charts

Chart (1971)	Peak position
Australia	35
Canada RPM Top Singles	3
Canada RPM Adult Contemporary	1
Japanese Singles Chart	7
New Zealand (Listener)	9
Quebec (ADISQ)	11
UK Singles Chart	18
US Billboard Hot 100	2
US Adult Contemporary (Billboard)	1
US Cashbox Radio Active Airplay Singles	1
US Cash Box Top 100	2

Year-end charts

Chart (1971)	Rank
Australia	173
Canada	52
U.S. Billboard Hot 100	30
U.S. Adult Contemporary (Billboard)	7
U.S. Cash Box Top 100	71

== Luther Vandross version ==
"Superstar"

Single by Luther Vandross

from the album Busy Body
- Released: March 1984
- Recorded: 1983, US
- Genre: R&B; soul; quiet storm
- Length: 5:32 (single edit version)
- Label: Epic
- Songwriters: Leon Russell; Bonnie Bramlett
- Producers: Luther Vandross; Larkin Arnold (exec.)

Luther Vandross singles chronology
"I'll Let You Slide" (1983)	"Superstar" (1984)	"Til My Baby Comes Home" (1985)

In the early 1980s, American R&B/soul singer-songwriter Luther Vandross had "Superstar" in his stage act, sometimes in a rendition that stretched to 12 minutes, with vocal interpolations and an interpretive dancer.

Vandross then recorded "Superstar" in 1983 in a slower, more soulful fashion, as part of a medley with Stevie Wonder's "Until You Come Back to Me (That's What I'm Gonna Do)" on his album Busy Body. Released as a single the following year, it became an R&B hit, reaching number 5 on the Billboard Top R&B Singles chart. It did not have much pop crossover effect, however, only reaching number 87 on the Billboard Hot 100.

=== Personnel ===
- Luther Vandross – lead and background vocals, vocal arrangement
- Yogi Horton – drums
- Marcus Miller – bass, synthesizers
- Nat Adderley Jr. – keyboards, string arrangement, horn arrangement, rhythm arrangement, synthesizer arrangement
- John "Skip" Anderson – synthesizers
- Georg Wadenius, Doc Powell – guitars
- Steve Kroon – congas
- Paulinho da Costa, Michael White – percussion
- Tawatha Agee, Brenda White, Phillip Ballou, Robin Clark – background vocals

Charts

Chart (1984)	Peak position
US Billboard Hot 100	87
US Billboard Hot R&B Singles	5

== Sonic Youth version ==
"Superstar"

Single by Sonic Youth

from the album If I Were a Carpenter
- A-side: "Yesterday Once More" (Redd Kross) (UK); "For All We Know" (Bettie Serveert) (US)
- Released: August 11, 1994
- Length: 4:06
- Label: A&M
- Songwriters: Bonnie Bramlett; Leon Russell
- Producers: Matt Wallace; David Konjoyan

Sonic Youth singles chronology
"Bull in the Heather" (1994)	"Superstar" (1994)	"The Diamond Sea" (1995)

Music video
- "Superstar" on YouTube

The American rock band Sonic Youth recorded "Superstar" for the 1994 Carpenters tribute album If I Were a Carpenter. A single of their version with Bettie Serveert's cover of "For All We Know" was released to US radio on August 11, 1994. Later on August 29, it was released commercially in the UK with Redd Kross' cover of "Yesterday Once More". Both covers by Bettie Serveert and Redd Kross are featured on the tribute album.

Sonic Youth's version reached number 26 on the Billboard Alternative Airplay chart, number 45 on the UK Singles Chart, and number 20 on the ARIA Hit Seekers Singles chart. The track was later included on the soundtrack of the 2007 film Juno. It was also featured in the film The Frighteners and in the theatrical trailer for High Tension, and in Bag of Suck during professional skateboarder Jerry Hsu's segment.

While Sonic Youth had always drawn inspiration from the Carpenters, Richard Carpenter, remarking on Sonic Youth's version during an interview with the National Public Radio program Fresh Air, stated, "I will say I don't care for it but I don't understand it. So, I'm not going to say it's good or it's bad. I'm just going to say I don't care for it."

=== Charts ===
Chart performance for "Superstar"
Chart (1994)	Peak position
Australia Hit Seekers (ARIA)	20
UK Singles (Official Charts)	45
US Alternative Airplay (Billboard)	26
US Alternative Airplay (Radio & Records)	25

=== Release history ===
Release dates and formats for "Superstar"
Region	Date	Format(s)	Label(s)	Ref.
United States (Note: Split single with "For All We Know" by Bettie Serveert)	August 11, 1994	College radio; modern rock radio	A&M	
United Kingdom (Note: Split single with "Yesterday Once More" by Redd Kross)	August 29, 1994	7-inch vinyl; CD; cassette	A&M	
Australia	November 28, 1994	CD; cassette	Polydor	

== Other versions ==
- Bette Midler recorded the song on her debut album The Divine Miss M.
- The Joe Cocker live album Mad Dogs and Englishmen includes Rita Coolidge performing "Superstar." Released in August 1970, Mad Dogs features performances recorded in March and June of that year. The double album became a hit, reaching No. 2 on the Billboard pop albums chart and No. 23 on the magazine's Black Albums chart.
- Cher recorded the song in October 1970, in a session produced by Stan Vincent. The following month, Atlantic issued a one-sided white label promotional single to radio stations. Despite favorable notices in Variety and Billboard, the song vanished without a trace. It appears as a bonus track on a 2001 CD reissue of Cher's 1969 album 3614 Jackson Highway.
- Australian singer, Colleen Hewett issued her debut single, "Super Star", in July 1971, which peaked at No. 30 on the Go-Set National Top 40.
- A version of the song was produced by Brian Wilson with American Spring for their eponymous album in 1972.
- Usher recorded the song for the 2005 album So Amazing: An All-Star Tribute to Luther Vandross; his version earned him a Grammy nomination for Best Male R&B Vocal Performance.
- Second-season American Idol contestant Ruben Studdard found his melismatic, R&B groove early in the Final 12 rounds when he performed a Vandross-influenced "Superstar". It got rave reviews from the judges and established Studdard as one of the early leaders in the competition, a position he held through his narrow May 2003 win over second-place finisher Clay Aiken. By now his signature song, Studdard recorded "Superstar" as the B-side of his June 2003 first single and number two hit, "Flying Without Wings". Studdard earned a 2004 Grammy Award nomination for Best Male R&B Vocal Performance for "Superstar", but he lost to his own idol, Vandross, who won for "Dance with My Father". Studdard's treatment was also included on his December 2003 debut album, Soulful.

== See also ==
- List of number-one adult contemporary singles of 1971 (U.S.)

== Sources ==
- October 2002 Blender magazine article by Johnny Black
- Allmusic discussion of song's origins
- Randy L. Schmidt, Little Girl Blue: The Life of Karen Carpenter, Chicago Review Press, 2010, ISBN 1-55652-976-7, pp. 77–78.
- IMDB listing of Bette Midler television appearances
- Australian PopArchives entry
- Australian Countdown entry
