= Yesterday Once More (song) =

- Artwork for U.S. vinyl single

Single by The Carpenters

from the album Now & Then
- B-side: "Road Ode"
- Released: May 16, 1973
- Recorded: 1973
- Studio: A&M Studios, Los Angeles, California
- Length: 3:56
- Label: A&M 1446
- Songwriters: Richard Carpenter, John Bettis
- Producers: Richard Carpenter, Karen Carpenter

The Carpenters singles chronology
"Sing" (1973)	"Yesterday Once More" (1973)	"Top of the World" (1973)

Official audio
- "Yesterday Once More" on YouTube

"Yesterday Once More", written by Richard Carpenter and John Bettis, is a hit song by The Carpenters from their 1973 album Now & Then. Thematically the song concerns reminiscing about songs of a generation gone by. It segues into a long medley, consisting of eight covers of 1960s tunes incorporated into a faux oldies radio program. The work takes up the entire B-side of the album.

The single version of the song peaked at number 2 on the Billboard Hot 100 chart, kept from the number 1 spot by "Bad, Bad Leroy Brown" by Jim Croce. It also became The Carpenters' ninth top-ten and fifth single to reach No. 2. in the Billboard Hot 100. The song also peaked at number 1 on the easy listening chart, becoming their eighth number 1 on that chart in four years. It is The Carpenters' biggest-selling record worldwide and their best-selling single in the UK, peaking at number 2.

According to Cash Box, on June 2, 1973, "Yesterday Once More" was the highest-debuting single at No. 71. By August 4, it had reached No. 1.

Richard Carpenter stated, on a Japanese documentary, that it was his favorite of all the songs that he had written. He has performed an instrumental version at concerts.

== Reception ==
Cash Box said that the "hook will knock everyone out."

== Personnel ==
- Karen Carpenter – lead and backing vocals, drums
- Richard Carpenter – backing vocals, piano, Wurlitzer electronic piano, Hammond organ, orchestration
- Joe Osborn – bass guitar
- Tony Peluso – electric guitar
- Earl Dumler – English horn
- Uncredited – tambourine

== Cover versions ==
- Japanese idol trio Candies covered the song on their 1974 album Abunai Doyōbi: Candies no Sekai.
- Redd Kross, a rock/punk band from Hawthorne, California covered the song on the 1994 Carpenters tribute album, If I Were a Carpenter. This cover was also released as a double A-side single with Sonic Youth's cover of "Superstar" to promote the album. It reached No. 45 on the UK Singles Chart and No. 84 on the Australian ARIA Charts.
- The Spinners covered the song in 1981, reaching No. 52 on the U.S. Billboard Hot 100 and No. 45 on the Adult Contemporary chart. As with many of the Spinners' records from that period, their cover of the song included an additional bridge composed by Michael Zager, "Nothing Remains the Same," and was billed as a medley.

== Charts ==
=== Weekly charts ===
Chart (1973)	Peak position
Australia (Kent Music Report)	9
Belgium (Ultratop 50 Flanders)	5
Belgium (Ultratop 50 Wallonia)	15
Canada Top Singles (RPM)	1
Canada Adult Contemporary (RPM)	1
Ireland (IRMA)	8
Oricon International Singles Chart	1
Oricon (Japanese) Singles Chart	5
Netherlands (Dutch Top 40)	7
Netherlands (Single Top 100)	5
New Zealand (RMNZ)	2
Norway (VG-lista)	6
Quebec (ADISQ)	3
UK Singles (Official Charts)	2
US Billboard Hot 100	2
US Adult Contemporary (Billboard)	1
US Cash Box Top 100	1
US Cashbox Radio Active Airplay Singles	1
West Germany (Official German Charts)	21

=== Year-end charts ===
Chart (1973)	Rank
Australia (Kent Music Report)	65
Belgium (Ultratop Flanders)	54
Canada Top Singles (RPM)	23
Netherlands (Dutch Top 40)	60
Netherlands (Single Top 100)	63
US Billboard Hot 100	70
US Adult Contemporary (Billboard)	10
US Cash Box	43

== Certifications ==
Sales and certifications for Yesterday Once More
Region	Certification	Certified units/sales
Japan	—	600,000
New Zealand (RMNZ)	Gold	15,000^{‡}
United Kingdom (BPI)	Silver	354,000
United States (RIAA)	Gold	1,000,000^{^}
^{^} Shipments figures based on certification alone.^{‡} Sales+streaming figures based on certification alone.

== See also ==
- List of Billboard Easy Listening number ones of 1973
- List of number-one singles of 1973 (Canada)
