= Richard Carpenter =

American pop musician (born 1946)

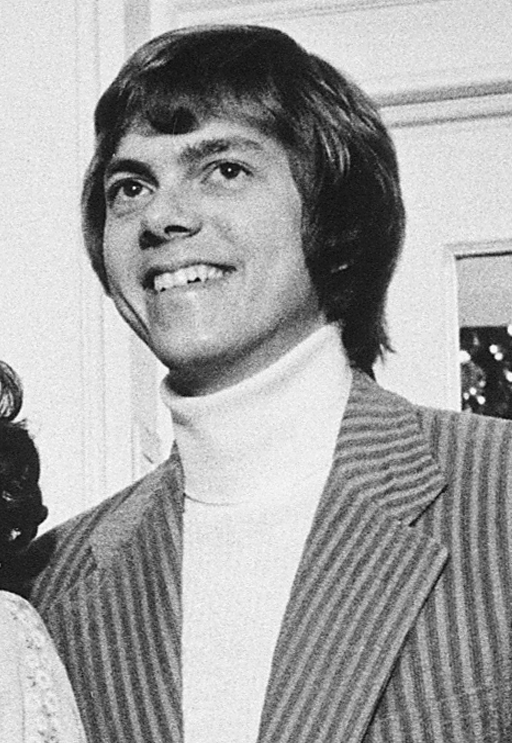
- Carpenter in 1972

Background information
- Born: Richard Lynn Carpenter; October 15, 1946 (age 80); New Haven, Connecticut, U.S.
- Origin: Downey, California, U.S.
- Genre: Pop
- Occupations: Musician; singer; songwriter; record producer
- Instruments: Vocals; keyboards
- Years active: 1965–present
- Labels: A&M/PolyGram, Decca
- Formerly of: The Carpenters; The Richard Carpenter Trio; Spectrum
- Website: richardandkarencarpenter.com
- Spouse: Mary Rudolph (m. 1984)

Richard Lynn Carpenter (born October 15, 1946) is an American musician, singer, songwriter, and record producer, who formed half of the sibling duo the Carpenters alongside his younger sister Karen. He had numerous roles in the Carpenters, including record producer, arranger, pianist, keyboardist, and songwriter, while also singing harmony vocals with Karen.

== Early life ==
Richard Lynn Carpenter was born on October 15, 1946, at Grace-New Haven Hospital (now called Yale New Haven Hospital) in New Haven, Connecticut, the same hospital where his sister, Karen, was later born. His parents were Agnes Reuwer Tatum (a housewife) (March 5, 1915 – November 10, 1996) and Harold Bertram Carpenter (November 8, 1908 – October 15, 1988). Harold was born in China, where his parents were missionaries, and was educated at boarding schools in England, before working in the printing business. Richard and his sister were baptized into the United Methodist Church and as children were part of the Methodist Youth Ministry.

Carpenter frequently played the piano while his younger sister, Karen, played baseball outside. He and Karen also liked to listen to the children's records their father bought for them when they were young. Carpenter was introduced to the music of Perry Como and Ella Fitzgerald, among many, by his father's record collection and, by age 12, he knew he wanted to be in the music business. Carpenter's first public appearance as a musician was at age 16 in New Haven. Along with two older friends, a group was formed and they played at a local pizza parlor. Carpenter joined the venture to earn money to buy a car. The Carpenter family moved from New Haven to Downey, California in June 1963. They wanted Richard to further his music career, and Harold Carpenter especially was tired of the New England winters.

After graduating from Downey High School in 1964, Carpenter studied music at California State College at Long Beach (now known as California State University, Long Beach). There, he met Frank Pooler, a conductor and composer who would write the lyrics to the Christmas classic "Merry Christmas Darling" in 1968. Carpenter also met his good friend John Bettis, who co-wrote songs with him. At Long Beach, Carpenter also met Gary Sims, Dan Woodhams and Doug Strawn, who later became members of the Carpenters' live band.

== The Richard Carpenter Trio, Spectrum and Summerchimes ==
Carpenter created the Richard Carpenter Trio in 1965 with his sister Karen and friend Wes Jacobs. Richard played the piano, Karen played the drums, and Wes played the tuba and bass.

In 1966, the Richard Carpenter Trio played "Iced Tea" and "The Girl from Ipanema" at the Hollywood Bowl Battle of the Bands. They won the competition and shortly after recorded three songs at RCA Studios: "Every Little Thing", "Strangers in the Night" and the Carpenter original, "Iced Tea". "Iced Tea" is the only recording that was officially released to the public, having been included on the 2003 compilation album The Essential Collection 1965–1997, released by A&M Records.

In 1967, Richard and John Bettis worked briefly at Disneyland but were fired by their talent supervisor, one Vic Guder, for performing modern pop music instead of the turn-of-the-century songs they were hired to play. When their second album, "Close to You" released in 1970, Carpenter composed a song titled "Mr. Guder" out of pure aggravation and revenge for the man. Later in 1967, Richard, Karen, and Bettis joined three other student musicians (Leslie Johnson, Gary Sims and Danny Woodhams) from Long Beach State to form a sextet, Spectrum. Although Spectrum played frequently at LA-area nightclubs such as Whisky a Go Go, they met with an unenthusiastic response—their broad harmonies and avoidance of rock 'n' roll limited the band's commercial potential. Yet Spectrum was fruitful in another way, providing the raw material of future success: Bettis went on to become a lyricist for Richard's songs and all the other members, except Leslie Johnston, became members of the Carpenters..

Following Spectrum, Carpenter formed Summerchimes. In a similar vein to Spectrum, the group was also short-lived but produced "Don't be Afraid", "All of My Life" and several other songs that appeared on the Carpenters' debut album.

== Career ==
Richard and Karen signed with A&M Records on April 22, 1969. "Let's hope we have some hits," Herb Alpert told them. According to Richard, Alpert gave them artistic freedom in the recording studios but after Offering, their first album, was released and wasn't a big seller, it was rumored that some of A&M's people were asking Alpert to abandon the Carpenters but he believed in their talent and insisted on giving them another chance.

Alpert suggested the Carpenters record a Burt Bacharach and Hal David song called "(They Long to Be) Close to You" written in 1963. Though Richard worked up an arrangement only at Alpert's insistence, the song was an overnight success. Released on May 14, 1970, it rocketed up the Top 40 charts to No. 1, where it stayed for four weeks during June and July, paving the way for the duo's future records.

Sitting at home one night, Richard was watching TV and saw a commercial for Crocker National Bank. He recognized the voices of Paul Williams and Roger Nichols, two A&M songwriters on the commercial's theme song "We've Only Just Begun". Richard made some calls to confirm their involvement and asked if there was a full version of the song, which Williams affirmed. Carpenter managed to turn the bank commercial jingle into an RIAA-certified Gold record. It peaked at No. 2 on the Billboard Hot 100 and has become a popular wedding song. The song also successfully launched the careers of Nichols and Williams, who went on to write multiple hits for the Carpenters and many other artists.

Richard composed many of the Carpenters' hits as well with John Bettis as lyricist such as:

- "Goodbye to Love" (1972; #7; one of the first pop ballads to have a fuzz guitar solo—influenced the development of the power ballad)
- "Top of the World" (1972; No. 1. Though the Carpenters originally opted to not release this song as a single, a version recorded by Lynn Anderson reached No. 2 on the Billboard Country chart; following the success of Anderson's version, the Carpenters decided to release their version as a single, and it reached number one on the Billboard Hot 100.)
- "Yesterday Once More" (1973; #2)
- "Only Yesterday" (1975; #4)

== Quaalude addiction and treatment ==
A reviewer of the BBC documentary Only Yesterday: The Carpenters Story (2007) noted that as the Carpenters' fame grew, "cracks began to show in their wholesome facade." Behind their carefully maintained public image, both siblings were facing significant personal struggles. Richard Carpenter's problems with Quaaludes began in the early 1970s, when his mother, Agnes, gave him one of her own prescribed tablets after becoming concerned about his inability to sleep. Although initially taken as a remedy for insomnia, his use of the drug gradually developed into a dependency. Meanwhile, Karen Carpenter's concerns about her weight became increasingly serious during the mid-1970s, eventually developing into anorexia nervosa. The pressures of their demanding touring schedule and the expectations surrounding their success placed increasing strain on both siblings.jamdog (April 11, 2007). "Only Yesterday – The Carpenters Story". Aerial Telly.

By 1975, the effects of these pressures had become increasingly apparent. The Carpenters cancelled a planned tour of Japan and Europe that year as Karen's health declined, with her weight loss becoming a growing concern. They returned to both regions the following year, including a successful sold-out engagement at the London Palladium. However, Richard's dependence on Quaaludes continued, and their relentless schedule was increasingly affected by health problems. In September 1978, Richard left the MGM Grand engagement in Las Vegas before its completion because of health issues. He subsequently entered treatment for Quaalude dependency in 1979.

Nick Talevski similarly observed in Rock Obituaries – Knocking on Heaven’s Door (2010) that the Carpenters’ constant touring since 1970 had taken a toll on both siblings by the mid-1970s. He noted that Karen's weight had fallen to 80 pounds, resulting in the cancellation of a tour, while Richard had become addicted to the prescription drug Quaalude.Talevski, Nick (2010). Rock Obituaries – Knocking on Heaven’s Door. Omnibus Press. ISBN 9780857121172.

By late 1978, Richard was receiving increasing pressure from family and friends to confront his addiction, receiving "much encouragement (and browbeating) … to 'face the music.'""Biography". RichardAndKarenCarpenter.com. p. 9. In January 1979, while heavily affected by Quaaludes, Richard fell down a flight of stairs backstage, an incident that finally forced him to acknowledge the seriousness of his dependency. Richard entered a six-week treatment program at the Menninger Clinic in Topeka, Kansas, where he overcame his addiction.

Richard later described the first three weeks of treatment as "hell on earth,” but said that afterwards “things really started to change … all for the better." Recognizing that recovery represented a major transition in his life, Richard chose not to immediately return to performing and instead took the remainder of 1979 away from work to adjust to his changed circumstances.

== Post-Carpenters activities ==
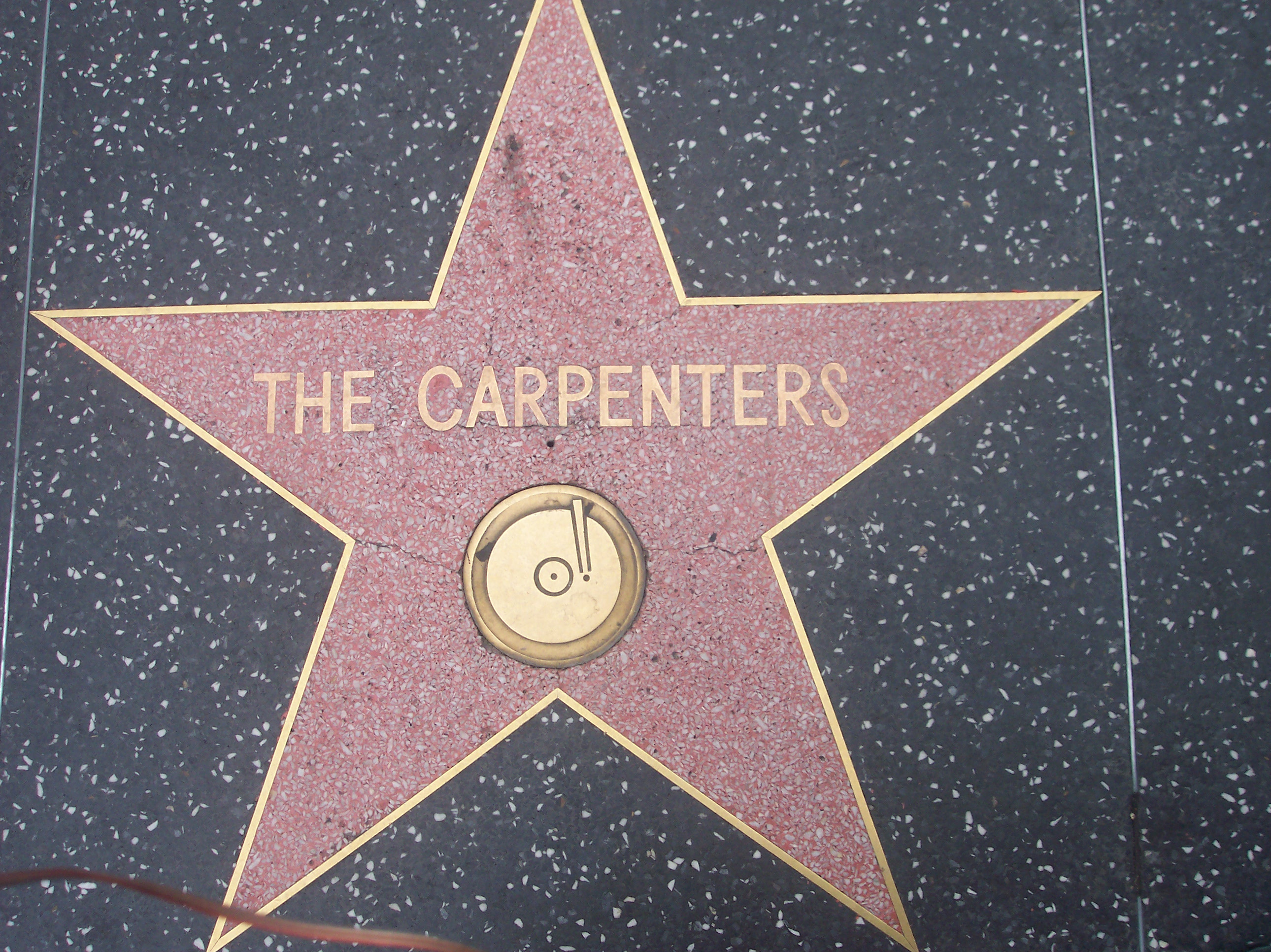
The Carpenters' star at the Hollywood Walk of Fame

On October 12, 1983, eight months after Karen's death, the Carpenter family celebrated the unveiling of the Carpenters' new star on the Hollywood Walk of Fame. Richard said in his speech, "This is a sad day, but at the same time a very special and beautiful day to my family and [me]. My only regret is that Karen is not physically here to share it with us, but I know that she is very much alive in our minds, and in our hearts."

On June 26, 1986, Carpenter started recording the solo album Time and finished it on July 5, 1987. The album features Dusty Springfield singing "Something in Your Eyes", Dionne Warwick singing "In Love Alone", Scott Grimes singing "That's What I Believe" and a song Richard created – dedicated to Karen – called "When Time Was All We Had", which starts off a cappella, but then Richard's piano fades in as well as Herb Alpert's flugelhorn. Lyrics include:

Our hearts were filled with music and laughter,
Your voice will be the sweetest sound I'll ever hear and yet,
We knew somehow the song would never end,
When time was all we had to spend.

In 1989, Carpenter arranged, produced and performed on Scott Grimes's eponymous debut album.

In 1996, at the suggestion of music writer Daniel Levitin, Carpenter recorded and released Richard Carpenter: Pianist, Arranger, Composer, Conductor, which included reworkings of many Carpenters favorites, including hits and album tracks, and ends with "Karen's Theme", which Carpenter composed for the television film The Karen Carpenter Story (1989).

Carpenter released the DVDs Gold: Greatest Hits (2002), a repackaging of the VHS/Betamax Yesterday Once More (released in 1985, two years after Karen's death in 1983) that contains all the videos from Yesterday Once More, and Interpretations (2003), which updates the original, VHS/cassette tape released in 1995 and includes footage from the Carpenters' five TV specials and TV series from 1971 to 1980. The DVD follows the compilation album of the same name, which had been released earlier the same year, and includes eleven Carpenters' tracks never before available on DVD (including "From This Moment On", an outtake from the Carpenters' fifth television special), all of them digitally enhanced and remastered in stereo audio.

On his 62nd birthday in October 2008, at a luncheon for The Foreign Correspondents Club of Japan, Carpenter announced plans for "his career comeback – dubbed 'Richard Carpenter Strikes Back'"—which included "the re-release of a Carpenters Christmas album and a tribute album featuring other versions of Carpenters songs."

=== Documentaries ===
The 43-minute film Superstar: The Karen Carpenter Story (1987) was directed by Todd Haynes and was withdrawn from circulation in 1990, after Haynes lost a copyright infringement lawsuit filed by Richard. The film's title is derived from the Carpenters' 1971 hit song, "Superstar". Over the years, it has developed into a cult film and is included in Entertainment Weekly's 2003 list of top 50 cult movies.

Carpenter helped in the productions of the documentaries Close to You: Remembering the Carpenters (1997) and Only Yesterday: The Carpenters Story (2007).

The most recent documentary is Karen Carpenter: Starving for Perfection (2023) on Amazon Prime.

=== Scholarship/talent show ===
Carpenter funds an annual scholarship/talent show for people with artistic abilities that is held at the Thousand Oaks Civic Center.

== Musical instruments ==
Carpenter used a wide range of keyboard instruments including grand piano, Hammond organ, Wurlitzer electric piano, ARP Odyssey, Fender Rhodes electric piano, harpsichord, celesta, synthesizer and tack piano. His favorite grand piano was Baldwin. In the 1970s, he initially endorsed and used Wurlitzer electric pianos before switching to the Fender Rhodes electric piano. He says that at A&M Studios, he regularly used a Steinway piano on the Carpenters' records with the exception of the A Song for You album in which he played a Baldwin piano which was autographed by Liberace.

On stage, he had both a Wurlitzer electric piano and grand piano, but after switching to the Fender Rhodes, he would simply choose among the three for various songs on stage. He has described the sound of the Wurlitzer electric piano as "warm" and "beautiful" and via overdubbing in the studio, he regularly supplemented his grand piano with a Wurlitzer electric piano to thicken the sound, thus creating a distinctive keyboard sound.

On the song "Happy" on Horizon, he made his earliest experiments with the ARP Odyssey synthesizer.

== Personal life ==
Richard dated Maria Luisa Galeazzi (Cooper), Karen's hair and makeup artist, for several years in the 1970s. On May 19, 1984, Carpenter married his first cousin (by adoption), Mary Rudolph. Her brother, Mark Rudolph, was the Carpenters' road manager as well as the radio call-in "contestant" in the [Oldies] "Medley" on the album Now & Then (1973). The couple had been dating since the late 1970s. A young Mary made a cameo appearance in the Carpenters' promotional video for the song "I Need to Be in Love" (1976).

Richard and Mary Carpenter have five children. They live in Thousand Oaks, California and Richard and the children sometimes perform music together at various Carpenter-related events.

Carpenter is a Mopar automobile enthusiast.

== Biographies ==
In 2021, longtime Carpenters historian Chris May and Associated Press entertainment journalist Mike Cidoni Lennox published Carpenters: The Musical Legacy, based on interviews with Richard Carpenter. It features rare photographs and newly revealed stories behind the making of the albums. Goldmine said the book "provided a candid and detailed look at much of what went into the Carpenters sound as well as Richard's personal thoughts on the music business today."

== Discography ==
=== Studio albums ===
List of albums, with selected details
| Title | Details | Peak chart positions |
| Title | Details | SCO |
|---|---|---|
| Time | Released: October 11, 1987; Label: A&M; Formats: CD, CS, LP | — |
| Pianist, Arranger, Composer, Conductor | Released: January 27, 1998; Label: A&M; Formats: CD, CS | — |
| Richard Carpenter's Piano Songbook | Released: January 14, 2022; Label: Decca; Formats: CD, digital download | 75 |
"—" denotes a recording that did not chart or was not released in that territory.

=== Singles ===
List of singles, with selected chart positions, showing year released and album name
| Title | Year | Peak chart positions | | Album |
| Title | Year | US AC | UK | Album |
|---|---|---|---|---|
| "Something in Your Eyes" (featuring Dusty Springfield) | 1987 | 12 | 84 | Time |
| "Calling Your Name Again" | 1987 | — | — | Time |
| "Karen's Theme" | 1998 | — | — | Pianist, Arranger, Composer, Conductor |
| "Medley" | 1998 | — | — | Pianist, Arranger, Composer, Conductor |
"—" denotes a recording that did not chart or was not released in that territory.
