= Michael Learns to Rock discography =

- Studio albums: 9
- Live albums: 1
- Compilation albums: 19
- Singles: 38
- Music videos: 31

The following are all the albums and singles released by the Danish soft rock band Michael Learns to Rock.

== Albums ==
=== Studio albums ===
Title	Album details	Peak chart positions						Certifications
Title	Album details	DEN	FIN	GER	NOR	SWE	SWI	Certifications
Michael Learns to Rock	Released: 13 August 1991; Label: Medley; Formats: LP, CD, Cassette	1	—	—	5	—	—	DEN: 2× Platinum
Colours	Released: 1 October 1993; Label: Medley; Formats: LP, CD	9	—	43	—	43	—	DEN: Gold
Played on Pepper	Released: 28 August 1995; Label: Medley; Formats: CD, cassette	3	—	—	30	—	9	DEN: 2× Platinum
Nothing to Lose	Released: 12 September 1997; Label: Medley; Formats: CD, cassette	3	—	—	—	—	12	DEN: Platinum
Blue Night	Released: 29 November 2000; Label: Medley; Formats: CD, cassette, digital download	9	32	—	17	44	25	DEN: 2× Platinum
Michael Learns to Rock	Released: 9 February 2004; Label: Medley; Formats: CD, digital download	9	—	—	—	34	89	DEN: 2× Platinum
Eternity	Released: 27 October 2008; Label: At:tack, MLTR Music; Formats: CD, digital download	22	—	—	—	—	—	
Scandinavia	Released: 26 June 2012; Label: Sony Music, MLTR Music; Formats: CD, digital download	19	—	—	—	—	—	
Still	Released: 21 March 2018; Label: MLTR Music; Formats: CD, digital download	—	—	—	—	—	—	
"—" denotes items which were not released in that country or failed to chart.

=== Compilation albums ===
Title	Album details	Peak chart positions					Certifications
Title	Album details	DEN	FIN	NOR	SWE	SWI	Certifications
Paint My Love – Greatest Hits	Release date: October 1996; Label: Medley	—	—	—	—	—	
Complicated Heart – Greatest Hits Vol. 2	Release date: 26 March 1999; Label: Medley	—	—	—	—	—	
MLTR^{[A]}	Release date: 10 May 1999; Label: Medley	1	13	15	3	22	DEN: 2× Platinum; SWE: Gold
19 Love Ballads^{[B]}	Release date: 2001; Label: EMI	2	—	13	7	45	
All the Best of Michael Learns to Rock	Release date: 2004; Label: EMI	—	—	—	—	—	
All the Best	Release date: 2005; Label: EMI	—	—	—	—	—	
Frostbite	Release date: 2005; Label: EMI	—	—	—	—	—	
That's Why (You Go Away)	Release date: 2005; Label: EMI	—	—	—	—	—	
The Ultimate Collection	Release date: 2005; Label: EMI	—	—	—	—	—	
India Tour Edition	Release date: 2005; Label: EMI	—	—	—	—	—	
Ultimate Collection 15th Anniversary Edition	Release date: 2006; Label: EMI	—	—	—	—	—	
I Walk This Road Alone	Release date: 2007; Label: EMI	—	—	—	—	—	
Greatest Hits – Asian Tour Limited Edition	Release date: 2007; Label: EMI	—	—	—	—	—	
The Best of Michael Learns to Rock – Live	Release date: 2007; Label: RecArt	—	—	—	—	—	
Out of the Blue – The Best of MLTR	Release date: 2009; Label: EMI	—	—	—	—	—	
Everlasting Love Songs	Release date: 2011; Label: EMI	—	—	—	—	—	
De første fra Michael Learns to Rock	Release date: 2012; Label: EMI	—	—	—	—	—	
The Ultimate Collection	Release date: 2013 (Malaysia); Label: Warner	—	—	—	—	—	
25: The Complete Singles	Release date: 25 October 2014; Label: MLTR	—	—	—	—	—	
"—" denotes items which were not released in that country or failed to chart.

Notes

- A MLTR was released as Strange Foreign Beauty in the United Kingdom, and as Strange Foreign Beauty - Remixed & More in Asia.
- B 19 Love Ballads was released as 19 Love Songs in South Africa and Europe.

=== Live albums ===
Title	Album details
The Best of Michael Learns to Rock – Live	Release date: 2007; Label: EMI

== Extended plays ==
Title	EP details
With Love	Release date: 6 May 2016; Label: MLTR; Format: Digital download

== Singles ==
Year	Single	Peak chart positions						Album
Year	Single	DEN	FRA	GER	NOR	SWE	SWI	Album
1991	"My Blue Angel"	—	—	—	—	—	—	Michael Learns to Rock (1991)
1991	"I Still Carry On"	—	—	—	—	—	—	Michael Learns to Rock (1991)
1991	"The Actor"	4	—	—	1	7	32	Michael Learns to Rock (1991)
1993	"Sleeping Child"	—	—	—	—	43	—	Colours
1993	"Wild Women"	—	—	52	—	—	—	Colours
1994	"25 Minutes"	6	—	59	—	—	—	Colours
1994	"Something Right"	—	—	—	—	—	—	Colours
1995	"Someday"	3	—	—	—	—	—	Played on Pepper
1995	"That's Why (You Go Away)"	1	32	81	—	—	22	Played on Pepper
1996	"How Many Hours"	7	—	—	—	—	—	Played on Pepper
1996	"Paint My Love"	4	—	—	—	—	27	Paint My Love
1997	"Breaking My Heart"	—	—	—	—	—	—	Nothing to Lose
1997	"Something You Should Know"	4	—	—	—	—	—	Nothing to Lose
1997	"I'm Gonna Be Around"	15	—	—	—	—	—	Nothing to Lose
1999	"Strange Foreign Beauty"	—	—	—	—	—	—	MLTR
1999	"Complicated Heart ('99 remix)"	—	—	—	—	—	—	MLTR
1999	"Sleeping Child (special remix)"	—	—	—	—	—	—	MLTR
1999	"The Actor ('99 remix)"	—	—	—	—	—	—	MLTR
2000	"Angel Eyes"	—	—	—	—	—	—	Blue Night
2000	"You Took My Heart Away"	—	—	—	—	—	—	Blue Night
2001	"One Way Street"	—	—	—	—	—	—	Blue Night
2001	"The Ghost of You"	—	—	—	—	—	—	19 Love Ballads
2003	"Frostbite"	—	—	—	—	—	—	Michael Learns to Rock (2004)
2004	"Final Destination"	—	—	—	—	—	—	Michael Learns to Rock (2004)
2004	"Salvation"	—	—	—	—	—	—	Michael Learns to Rock (2004)
2004	"Take Me to Your Heart"	—	—	—	—	—	—	Michael Learns to Rock (2004)
2004	"This Is Who I Am"	—	—	—	—	—	—	Michael Learns to Rock (2004)
2008	"When Tomorrow Comes"	—	—	—	—	—	—	Eternity
2008	"Sweetest Surprise"	—	—	—	—	—	—	Eternity
2011	"The Actor 2011"	—	—	—	—	—	—	Non-album single
2012	"Renovate My Life"	—	—	—	—	—	—	Scandinavia
2012	"Any Way You Want It"	—	—	—	—	—	—	Scandinavia
2014	"Silent Times"	—	—	—	—	—	—	25: The Complete Singles
2014	"Call on Love"	—	—	—	—	—	—	25: The Complete Singles
2015	"Eternal Love"	—	—	—	—	—	—	Healer Soundtrack
2015	"I'll Wait for You"	—	—	—	—	—	—	With Love
2016	"We Shared the Night"	—	—	—	—	—	—	With Love
2016	"Dream Girl"	—	—	—	—	—	—	With Love
2018	"Everything You Need"	—	—	—	—	—	—	Still
2018	"Hold on a Minute"	—	—	—	—	—	—	Still
2021	"Children of Tomorrow"	—	—	—	—	—	—	
2024	"A Life to Remember"	—	—	—	—	—	—	
"—" denotes releases that did not chart or were not released to that country

== Music videos ==
- "My Blue Angel" (1991)
- "I Still Carry On" (1991)
- "The Actor" (1991)
- "Sleeping Child" (1993)
- "Wild Women" (1993)
- "25 Minutes" (1993)
- "That's Why (You Go Away)" (1995)
- "How Many Hours" (1995)
- "Someday" (1995)
- "Paint My Love" (1996)
- "Breaking My Heart" (1997)
- "Nothing to Lose" (1997)
- "I'm Gonna Be Around" (1997)
- "Something You Should Know" (1997)
- "Strange Foreign Beauty" (1999)
- "Complicated Heart" ('99 remix) (1999)
- "I'm Gonna Be Around" (radio version) (1999)
- "You Took My Heart Away" (2000)
- "Blue Night" (2000)
- "Take Me to Your Heart" (2004)
- "The Ghost of You" (2004)
- "If You Leave My World" (2004)
- "Without Your Love" (2004)
- "It's Only Love" (2007)
- "I Walk This Road Alone" (2007)
- "Sweetest Surprise" (2008)
- "Any Way You Want It" (2012)
- "The Silent Times" (2014)
- "Call on Love" (2014)
- "I'll Wait for You" (2015)
- "We Shared the Night" (2016)
- "Hold On a Minute" (2018)
- "Hiding Away from Life" (2018)
- "A Life to Remember" (2024)
