= 25: The Complete Singles =

Greatest hits album by Michael Learns to Rock
- Released: 25 October 2014
- Recorded: 1991–Late 2013
- Genre: Soft rock, pop rock, pop
- Label: MLTR Music, Atlantic Records

Michael Learns to Rock chronology
Scandinavia (2012)	25: The Complete Singles (2014)	Still (2018)

Singles from 25: The Complete Single
- 1. "Silent Times" Released: September 16, 2014; 2. "Call on Love" Released: December 18, 2014

25: The Complete Singles is a greatest hits album by Danish soft rock band Michael Learns to Rock, released on 25 October 2014 by MLTR Music. The album is released in commemoration of the band's 25 year anniversary. It includes two new studio recordings, "Silent Times" and "Call on Love". The first single, "Silent Times" was released on 16 September 2014.

== Track listing ==
Disc 1
No.	Title	Writer(s)	Producer(s)	Length
1.	"The Actor" (from Michael Learns to Rock, 1991)	Jascha Richter	Jens Hofman, Oli Poulsen	4:34
2.	"Crazy Dream" (from Michael Learns to Rock, 1991)	Richter, Michael Price, Terry Lupton	Steve Barri, Tony Peluso	3:59
3.	"Sleeping Child" (from Colours)	Richter	Oli Poulsen, Michael Learns to Rock	3:35
4.	"25 Minutes" (from Colours)	Richter	Poulsen, Michael Learns to Rock	4:23
5.	"Complicated Heart" (from Colours)	Richter	Poulsen, Michael Learns to Rock	4:26
6.	"Out of the Blue" (from Colours)	Richter	Poulsen, Michael Learns to Rock	4:00
7.	"That's Why (You Go Away)" (from Played on Pepper)	Richter	Michael Learns to Rock	4:13
8.	"Someday" (from Played on Pepper)	Richter	Michael Learns to Rock	3:52
9.	"Love Will Never Lie" (from Played on Pepper)	Richter, Ashley Mulford	Michael Learns to Rock	3:35
10.	"How Many Hours" (from Played on Pepper)	Richter	Michael Learns to Rock	4:44
11.	"I'm Gonna Be Around" (from Nothing to Lose)	Richter, Poulsen, Mulford	Poulsen	4:21
12.	"Nothing to Lose" (from Nothing to Lose)	Richter	Michael Learns to Rock	3:59
13.	"Breaking My Heart" (from Nothing to Lose)	Richter	Michael Learns to Rock	4:04

Disc 2
No.	Title	Writer(s)	Producer(s)	Length
1.	"Paint My Love" (from Paint My Love)	Richter	Michael Learns to Rock	3:50
2.	"Strange Foreign Beauty" (from MLTR)	Richter	Michael Learns to Rock	4:47
3.	"You Took My Heart Away" (from Blue Night)	Richter	Boe Larsen, Mikkel Lentz	4:31
4.	"Blue Night" (from Blue Night)	Richter, Soulpoets	Larsen, Lentz	3:43
5.	"The Ghost of You" (from 19 Love Songs)	Ricther, Johan Stentorp	Stentorp	4:01
6.	"Take Me to Your Heart" (from Michael Learns to Rock, 2004)	Philip Yin, Richter	Johan Bejerholm	3:58
7.	"If You Leave My World" (from Michael Learns to Rock, 2004)	Richter	Chief 1	4:16
8.	"It's Only Love" (from The Best of Michael Learns to Rock — Live)	Ricther, Stentorp	Stentorp	4:35
9.	"Sweetest Surprise" (from Eternity)	Marcus Winther-John	Lentz	3:10
10.	"Any Way You Want It" (from Scandinavia)	Richter	Lentz	3:45
11.	"Silent Times"	Wayne Hector, Peter Wallevik, Patrick Joseph Devine, Tommy "Gee" Gregersen	Wallevik, Gregersen, Richter^{[a]}, Lentz^{[a]}	3:51
12.	"Call on Love"	Nasri Atweh, Adam Messinger, Liz Rodrigues		4:08

Notes

- ^{^[a]} signifies a vocal producer

== Release history ==
Country	Date	Format(s)	Label
Indonesia	25 October 2014	CD, digital download	Warner Music
Hong Kong	25 October 2014	CD, digital download	Warner Music
Malaysia	25 October 2014	CD, digital download	Warner Music
Philippines	25 October 2014	CD, digital download	Warner Music
Singapore	25 October 2014	CD, digital download	Warner Music
Taiwan	25 October 2014	CD, digital download	Warner Music
Thailand	25 October 2014	CD, digital download	Warner Music
Vietnam	25 October 2014	CD, digital download	Warner Music
