= Paint My Love – Greatest Hits =

Greatest hits album by Michael Learns to Rock
- Released: October 1, 1996
- Genre: Soft rock
- Label: Medley, Warner Records
- Producer: Steve Barri (also exec.), Poul Bruun (exec.), Jens Hofman (also exec.), Michael Learns to Rock, Randy Nicklaus (exec.), Tony Peluso, Oli Poulsen

Michael Learns to Rock chronology
Played on Pepper (1995)	Paint My Love – Greatest Hits (1996)	Nothing to Lose (1997)

Singles from Paint My Love - Greatest Hits
- 1. "Paint My Love" Released: 1996

Paint My Love – Greatest Hits is the first greatest hits album by the Danish soft rock band Michael Learns to Rock. It was released in October 1996 by Medley Records in Asia and South Africa. As of May 1999, the album had sold 3.4 million copies worldwide. The title song, "Paint My Love", is an English version of "Kun med dig" by Danish singers Dorthe Andersen and Martin Loft, which was composed by Jascha Richter. The song won the Danish national selection for the Eurovision Song Contest 1996, but was one of seven entries voted off in a pre-contest semifinal, which was not televised. "Paint My Love", along with the other new song "Breaking My Heart", was later included on the band's fourth studio album, Nothing to Lose (1997).

== Track listing ==
No.	Title	Writer(s)	Producer(s)	Length
1.	"Paint My Love"	Jascha Richter	Michael Learns to Rock	3:49
2.	"Sleeping Child" (from Colours)	Richter	Oli Poulsen, Michael Learns to Rock	3:33
3.	"That's Why (You Go Away)" (from Played on Pepper)	Richter	Michael Learns to Rock	4:10
4.	"The Actor" (from Michael Learns to Rock)	Richter	Poulsen, Jens Hofman	4:35
5.	"Wild Women" (from Colours)	Richter	Poulsen, Michael Learns to Rock	3:53
6.	"Love Will Never Lie" (from Played on Pepper)	Richter, Ashley Mulford	Michael Learns to Rock	3:34
7.	"I Still Carry On" (from Michael Learns to Rock)	Richter	Poulsen, Hofman	4:36
8.	"Complicated Heart" (from Colours)	Richter	Poulsen, Michael Learns to Rock	4:24
9.	"Breaking My Heart"	Richter	Michael Learns to Rock	4:03
10.	"Someday" (from Played on Pepper)	Richter	Michael Learns to Rock	3:52
11.	"Out of the Blue" (from Colours)	Richter	Poulsen, Michael Learns to Rock	3:58
12.	"25 Minutes" (from Colours)	Richter	Poulsen, Michael Learns to Rock	4:20
13.	"Breaking the Rules" (from Played on Pepper)	Richter	Michael Learns to Rock	4:22
14.	"How Many Hours" (from Played on Pepper)	Richter	Michael Learns to Rock	4:43
15.	"Crazy Dream" (from Michael Learns to Rock) (bonus track)	Richter, Terry Lupton, Michael Price	Steve Barri, Tony Peluso	4:00
16.	"Paint My Love" (acoustic version) (bonus track)	Richter	Michael Learns to Rock	3:48
17.	"Breaking My Heart" (alternative version) (bonus track)	Richter	Michael Learns to Rock	3:54

== Charts ==
Chart (1996)	Peak position
Malaysian Albums (RIM)	1

== Certifications and sales ==
Region	Certification	Certified units/sales
Hong Kong (IFPI Hong Kong)	Platinum	20,000^{*}
Indonesia	7× Platinum	350,000
Malaysia	14× Platinum	360,000
Philippines (PARI)	6× Platinum	240,000^{*}
Singapore (RIAS)	6× Platinum	90,000^{*}
South Korea (KMCA)	2× Platinum	60,000
Taiwan (RIT)	Platinum	50,000^{*}
Thailand	6× Platinum	200,000
Summaries
Southeast Asia	—	3,100,000
Worldwide	—	3,400,000
^{*} Sales figures based on certification alone.
