= 19 Love Ballads =

Compilation album by Michael Learns to Rock
- Released: Summer 2001
- Genre: Soft rock, pop rock
- Label: EMI

Michael Learns to Rock chronology
Blue Night (2000)	19 Love Ballads (2001)	Michael Learns to Rock (2004)

Singles from 19 Love Ballads
- 1. "The Ghost of You" Released: 2001 (Asia), 2002 (UK)

European edition

19 Love Ballads is a compilation album by Danish soft rock group Michael Learns to Rock. It was first released in summer 2001 by EMI in Asia, and in 2002 in Europe under the title 19 Love Songs. The album contains songs from Michael Learns to Rock's first five studio albums, including the new song "The Ghost of You".

== Track listing ==
19 Love Songs track listing
No.	Title	Writer(s)	Producer(s)	Length
1.	"The Ghost of You"	Jascha Richter, Johan Stentorp	Stentorp	4:02
2.	"The Actor"	Richter	Jens Hofman, Oli Poulsen, Tony Peluso	4:35
3.	"Sleeping Child"	Richter	Poulsen, MLTR	3:33
4.	"Complicated Heart"	Richter	Poulsen, MLTR	4:24
5.	"25 Minutes"	Richter	Poulsen, MLTR	4:20
6.	"Out of the Blue"	Richter	Poulsen, MLTR	4:20
7.	"I Wanna Dance"	Richter	Poulsen, MLTR	3:48
8.	"That's Why (You Go Away)"	Richter	MLTR	4:10
9.	"Love Will Never Lie"	Richter, Ashley Mulford	MLTR	3:34
10.	"How Many Hours"	Richter	MLTR	4:43
11.	"I'm Gonna Be Around"	Richter, Poulsen, Mulford	Poulsen	4:20
12.	"Nothing to Lose"	Richter	MLTR	3:58
13.	"Paint My Love"	Richter	MLTR	3:50
14.	"Breaking My Heart"	Richter	MLTR	4:04
15.	"Strange Foreign Beauty"	Richter	MLTR	4:04
16.	"You Took My Heart Away"	Richter	Boe Larsen, Mikkel Lentz (co.)	4:32
17.	"Blue Night"	Richter, Soulpoets	Larsen, Lentz (co.)	3:38
18.	"More Than a Friend"	Søren Madsen, Mulford	Larsen, Lentz (co.)	3:42
19.	"Forever and a Day"	Richter, Mulford	MLTR	3:18

== Charts ==
Chart performance for 19 Love Songs
Chart (2002)	Peak position
Danish Albums (Hitlisten)	2
Norwegian Albums (VG-lista)	13
Swedish Albums (Sverigetopplistan)	7
Swiss Albums (Schweizer Hitparade)	45
