= MLTR (album) =

Compilation album by Michael Learns to Rock
- Released: 10 May 1999
- Genre: Soft rock, pop rock
- Label: Medley
- Producer: Cutfather & Joe, David Kreuger, Per Magnusson, Michael Learns To Rock, Oli Poulsen

Michael Learns to Rock chronology
| Complicated Heart - Greatest Hits Vol. 2 (1999) | MLTR (1999) | Blue Night (2000) |

Singles from MLTR
- 1. "Strange Foreign Beauty" Released: 1999; 2. "Complicated Heart ('99 remix)" Released: 1999; 3. "Sleeping Child (special remix)" Released: 1999; 4. "The Actor ('99 remix)" Released: 1999

Strange Foreign Beauty: Remixed & More (Asian edition)

MLTR (also known as Greatest Hits and Strange Foreign Beauty) is the third compilation album by Danish soft rock group Michael Learns to Rock. It was released as Strange Foreign Beauty - Remixed & More in Asia on 10 May 1999 and in Denmark as MLTR on 19 May 1999 as their first compilation album there. In the United Kingdom, Strange Foreign Beauty was released as their debut release on Parlophone on 30 August 1999.

This compilation contains some of refined and remixed versions of songs from the group's first four studio albums, Michael Learns to Rock (1991), Colours (1993), Played on Pepper (1995), and Nothing to Lose (1997), as well as the new song "Strange Foreign Beauty".

== Track listing ==
MLTR (Scandinavian edition)
| No. | Title | Producer(s) | Length |
|---|---|---|---|
| 1. | "Strange Foreign Beauty" | MLTR | 4:46 |
| 2. | "Someday" (Longer Version from Played on Pepper) | MLTR | 4:05 |
| 3. | "Sleeping Child" ('99 Remix from Colours) | Cutfather & Joe | 3:30 |
| 4. | "Complicated Heart" ('99 Remix from Colours) | MLTR | 3:29 |
| 5. | "Something You Should Know" (from Nothing to Lose) | MLTR | 3:43 |
| 6. | "That's Why (You Go Away)" (from Played on Pepper) | MLTR | 4:13 |
| 7. | "The Actor" ('99 Remix from Michael Learns to Rock) | Per Magnusson, David Kreuger | 4:10 |
| 8. | "Wild Women" (Alternative Mix from Colours) | Oli Poulsen | 3:37 |
| 9. | "Breaking My Heart" (Alternative Version from Paint My Love - Greatest Hits) | MLTR | 3:54 |
| 10. | "I'm Gonna Be Around" (Radio Version from Nothing to Lose) | Magnusson, Kreuger | 3:45 |
| 11. | "I'm Gonna Come Back" (from Colours) | Poulsen | 4:12 |
| 12. | "Romantic Balcony" (from Nothing to Lose) | MLTR | 5:06 |
| 13. | "Out of the Blue" (from Colours) | Poulsen | 4:04 |
| 14. | "Sleeping Child" (Special Remix from Colours) | Chief 1 | 3:57 |

European edition bonus track
| No. | Title | Length |
|---|---|---|
| 15. | "25 Minutes" (from Colours) | 4:12 |

Strange Foreign Beauty: Remixed & More (Asian edition)
| No. | Title | Producer(s) | Length |
|---|---|---|---|
| 1. | "Strange Foreign Beauty" | MLTR | 4:46 |
| 2. | "Sleeping Child" (Special Remix) | Chief 1 | 3:57 |
| 3. | "The Actor" ('99 Remix) | Per Magnusson, David Kreuger | 4:10 |
| 4. | "Complicated Heart" ('99 Remix) | MLTR | 3:29 |
| 5. | "I'm Gonna Be Around" (Radio Version) | Magnusson, Kreuger | 3:45 |
| 6. | "Something You Should Know" (from Nothing to Lose) | MLTR | 3:43 |
| 7. | "That's Why (You Go Away)" (from Played on Pepper) | MLTR | 4:13 |
| 8. | "Forever And A Day" (from Nothing to Lose) | Richter, Mulford | 3:18 |
| 9. | "Someday" (Longer Version) | MLTR | 4:05 |
| 10. | "Breaking My Heart" (Alternative Version) | MLTR | 3:54 |
| 11. | "Time For Changes" (from 25 Minutes - B side) | Mulford, Richter | 3:54 |
| 12. | "Nothing To Lose" (from Nothing to Lose) | Richter | 3:56 |
| 13. | "Romantic Balcony" (from Nothing to Lose) | MLTR | 5:06 |

== Charts ==
| Chart (1999) | Peak position |
|---|---|
| Danish Albums (Hitlisten) | 1 |
| Finnish Albums (Suomen virallinen lista) | 13 |
| Norwegian Albums (VG-lista) | 15 |
| Swedish Albums (Sverigetopplistan) | 3 |
| Swiss Albums (Schweizer Hitparade) | 22 |

== Certifications ==
| Region | Certification | Certified units/sales |
|---|---|---|
| Sweden (GLF) | Gold | 40,000^{^} |
^{^} Shipments figures based on certification alone.
