= List of soft rock artists and songs =

The following is a list of notable soft rock bands and artists and their most notable soft rock songs. This list should not include artists whose main style of music is anything other than soft rock, even if they have released one or more songs that fall under the "soft rock" genre. (Such songs can be added under Category:Soft rock songs.)

Artists which have released music of various different genres throughout their career including soft rock as one of their main styles, may be included together with their notable soft rock songs.

== 0–9 ==
| Artist | Song(s) |
|---|---|
| 10cc | "I'm Not in Love"; "Marriage Bureau Rendezvous" |

== A ==
| Artist | Song(s) |
|---|---|
| Ace | "How Long" |
| Bryan Adams | "(Everything I Do) I Do It for You" |
| Air Supply | "All Out of Love"; "Even the Nights Are Better"; "Here I Am"; "Just as I Am"; "Lonely Is the Night"; "Lost in Love"; "Making Love Out of Nothing at All"; "The One That You Love" |
| The Alan Parsons Project | "Eye in the Sky" |
| Alessi Brothers | "Oh Lori" |
| Ambrosia | "Biggest Part of Me"; "How Much I Feel"; "You're the Only Woman (You & I)" |
| America | "A Horse with No Name"; "I Need You"; "Lonely People"; "Sister Golden Hair"; "Tin Man"; "Today's the Day"; "Ventura Highway" |
| Paul Anka | "(You're) Having My Baby" |
| The Association | "Along Comes Mary"; "Cherish"; "Everything That Touches You"; "Never My Love"; "Windy" |
| Atlanta Rhythm Section | "Imaginary Lover"; "So into You" |
| The Autumn Defense | "Canyon Arrow"; "Feel You Now" |

== B ==
| Artist | Song(s) |
|---|---|
| Bee Gees | "How Deep Is Your Love"; "I Started a Joke"; "New York Mining Disaster 1941"; "To Love Somebody" |
| The Bells | "Stay Awhile" |
| Stephen Bishop | "On and On" |
| Colin Blunstone | "I Don't Believe in Miracles"; "Say You Don't Mind" |
| James Blunt | "1973"; "So Far Gone"; "Stay the Night"; "Superstar" |
| Michael Bolton | "How Am I Supposed to Live Without You"; "How Can We Be Lovers?"; "Time, Love and Tenderness" |
| Karla Bonoff | "Somebody's Eyes" |
| Debby Boone | "You Light Up My Life" |
| Boston | "Amanda" |
| Bread | "Baby I'm-a Want You"; "Everything I Own"; "The Guitar Man"; "If"; "Lost Without Your Love"; "Make It with You" |
| Jackson Browne | "Fountain of Sorrow"; "The Pretender" |
| Peabo Bryson | "Tonight, I Celebrate My Love" (with Roberta Flack) |

== C ==
| Artist | Song(s) |
|---|---|
| Glen Campbell | "By the Time I Get to Phoenix"; "Galveston"; "Rhinestone Cowboy"; "Southern Nights"; "Wichita Lineman" |
| Jim Capaldi | "It's All Up to You" |
| Captain & Tennille | "Do That to Me One More Time"; "Love Will Keep Us Together"; "Muskrat Love" |
| Eric Carmen | "All by Myself"; "Never Gonna Fall in Love Again" |
| Kim Carnes | "Bette Davis Eyes" |
| The Carpenters | "(They Long to Be) Close to You"; "Goodbye to Love"; "Please Mr. Postman"; "Rainy Days and Mondays"; "Sing"; "Superstar"; "Top of the World"; "Touch Me When We're Dancing"; "We've Only Just Begun" |
| The Cars | Drive |
| Chad & Jeremy | Before and After; A Summer Song; Willow Weep for Me |
| Harry Chapin | "Cat's in the Cradle"; "Sniper"; "W·O·L·D" |
| Chicago | "Baby, What a Big Surprise"; "Brand New Love Affair, Part I & II"; "Colour My World"; "Does Anybody Really Know What Time It Is?"; "Hard Habit to Break"; "Hard to Say I'm Sorry"; "If You Leave Me Now"; "Make Me Smile"; "Saturday in the Park"; "Will You Still Love Me?"; "You're the Inspiration" |
| Eric Clapton | "Anything for Your Love"; "Everything Will Be Alright"; "I Shot the Sheriff"; "Lay Down Sally"; "Promises"; "Tears in Heaven"; "Wonderful Tonight" |
| Classics IV | "Spooky"; "Stormy"; "Traces" |
| Climax Blues Band | "Couldn't Get It Right"; "I Love You" |
| Joe Cocker | "Up Where We Belong" (with Jennifer Warnes) |
| Leonard Cohen | "On the Level" |
| Marc Cohn | "Walking in Memphis"; "Wild World" |
| Phil Collins | "Against All Odds (Take a Look at Me Now)"; "In the Air Tonight"; "One More Night"; "Separate Lives" |
| Jim Croce | "Bad, Bad Leroy Brown"; "Operator (That's Not the Way It Feels)" |
| Crosby, Stills, Nash & Young | "Lady of the Island" |
| Christopher Cross | "Ride Like the Wind"; "Sailing" |
| Burton Cummings | "Stand Tall" |
| Cymarron | "Rings" |

== D ==
| Artist | Song(s) |
|---|---|
| Paul Davis | "Cool Night"; "I Go Crazy" |
| Chris de Burgh | "Don't Pay the Ferryman"; "The Lady in Red" |
| John Denver | "Annie's Song"; "How Can I Leave You Again"; "I'm Sorry"; "Sunshine on My Shoulders" |
| Neil Diamond | "Sweet Caroline" |
| The Doobie Brothers | "Another Park, Another Sunday"; "It Keeps You Runnin'"; "Minute by Minute"; "Takin' It to the Streets"; "What a Fool Believes" |
| Dr. Hook & the Medicine Show | "A Little Bit More"; "Sharing the Night Together" |
| Robbie Dupree | "Steal Away" |

== E ==
| Artist | Song(s) |
|---|---|
| Eagles | "Best of My Love"; "Desperado"; "New Kid in Town"; "Peaceful Easy Feeling"; "Tequila Sunrise" |
| England Dan & John Ford Coley | "I'd Really Love to See You Tonight"; "Love Is the Answer"; "Nights Are Forever Without You" |
| Exile | "Kiss You All Over" |

== F ==
| Artist | Song(s) |
|---|---|
| Firefall | "Just Remember I Love You"; "You Are the Woman" |
| Five for Fighting | "100 Years"; "The Riddle"; "Superman (It's Not Easy)" |
| Roberta Flack | "Feel Like Makin' Love" |
| Fleetwood Mac | "Big Love"; "Dreams"; "Little Lies"; "Rhiannon"; "Sentimental Lady" |
| Dan Fogelberg | "Leader of the Band"; "Longer"; "Part of the Plan"; "Same Old Lang Syne" |
| Foreigner | "Cold as Ice"; "I Don't Want to Live Without You"; "I Want to Know What Love Is"; "Waiting for a Girl Like You" |
| Peter Frampton | "Baby, I Love Your Way" |
| Franke and the Knockouts | |

== G ==
| Artist | Song(s) |
|---|---|
| Gallery | |
| David Gates | |
| Genesis | "Hold on My Heart"; "Throwing It All Away" |
| Andy Gibb | "I Just Want to Be Your Everything" |
| Andrew Gold | "Lonely Boy"; "Thank You for Being a Friend" |
| Dobie Gray | "Drift Away" |
| Henry Gross | "Shannon" |
| Adrian Gurvitz | "Classic" |

== H ==
| Artist | Song(s) |
|---|---|
| Hall & Oates | "Kiss on My List"; "One on One"; "Rich Girl"; "Sara Smile" |
| Hamilton, Joe Frank & Reynolds | "Fallin' in Love" |
| Albert Hammond | "It Never Rains in Southern California" |
| Bertie Higgins | "Key Largo" |
| Dan Hill | "Sometimes When We Touch" |
| The Hollies | "The Air That I Breathe" |
| Rupert Holmes | "Escape (The Piña Colada Song)" |

== I ==
| Artist | Song(s) |
|---|---|
| Janis Ian | "At Seventeen" |

== J ==
| Artist | Song(s) |
|---|---|
| Terry Jacks | "Seasons in the Sun" |
| Jefferson Starship | "Miracles" |
| Billy Joel | "She's Always a Woman"; "This Night" |
| Elton John | "Bennie and the Jets"; "Burn Down the Mission"; "Daniel"; "Goodbye Yellow Brick Road"; "I Guess That's Why They Call It the Blues"; "Little Jeannie"; "Rocket Man"; "Sacrifice"; "Your Song" |
| Robert John | "Sad Eyes" |
| Sammy Johns | "Chevy Van" |
| Michael Johnson | "Bluer Than Blue"; "This Night Won't Last Forever" |
| Journey | "Lights"; "Open Arms" |

== K ==
| Artist | Song(s) |
|---|---|
| Kalapana | |
| Kansas | "Dust in the Wind" |
| Carole King | "So Far Away" |

== L ==
| Artist | Song(s) |
|---|---|
| Nicolette Larson | "Lotta Love" |
| Little River Band | "Help Is on Its Way"; "Reminiscing" |
| Dave Loggins | "Please Come to Boston" |
| Kenny Loggins | "This Is It"; "Whenever I Call You Friend" |
| Loggins and Messina | "Watching the River Run" |
| Looking Glass | "Brandy (You're a Fine Girl)" |

== M ==
| Artist | Song(s) |
|---|---|
| Mary MacGregor | "Torn Between Two Lovers" |
| The Magic Lanterns | |
| The Mamas & the Papas | "Dedicated to the One I Love" |
| Melissa Manchester | |
| Manic Street Preachers | "From Despair to Where"; "La Tristesse Durera (Scream to a Sigh)"; "Little Baby Nothing"; "Motorcycle Emptiness"; "Suicide is Painless" |
| Barry Manilow | "Can't Smile Without You"; "Could It Be Magic"; "Mandy" |
| Benny Mardones | "Into the Night" |
| Richard Marx | "Hazard"; "Hold On to the Nights"; "Now and Forever"; "Right Here Waiting" |
| Dave Mason | "Let It Go, Let It Flow"; "We Just Disagree" |
| Iain Matthews | |
| John Mayer | "Gravity"; "Paper Doll"; "Who You Love" (with Katy Perry); "Your Body Is a Wonderland" |
| Paul McCartney | "The Girl Is Mine" (with Michael Jackson); "Maybe I'm Amazed" |
| Sarah McLachlan | "Angel"; "Building a Mystery"; "Possession"; "Sweet Surrender" |
| Michael McDonald | "I Keep Forgettin' (Every Time You're Near)" |
| Don McLean | "American Pie" |
| Michael Learns to Rock | "Paint My Love"; "Sleeping Child"; "Someday" |
| Mike + The Mechanics | "All I Need Is a Miracle" |
| Ronnie Milsap | "Any Day Now"; "He Got You"; "Stranger in My House" |
| Joni Mitchell | "Carey"; "Free Man in Paris" |
| Van Morrison | "Brown Eyed Girl" |
| Jason Mraz | "I'm Yours" |
| Maria Muldaur | "Midnight at the Oasis" |
| Michael Martin Murphey | "Wildfire" |
| Anne Murray | "Bidin' My Time"; "Hard as I Try"; "Snowbird"; "You Needed Me" |

== N ==
| Artist | Song(s) |
|---|---|
| Randy Newman | |
| Olivia Newton-John | "Can I Trust Your Arms"; "I Honestly Love You"; "Magic"; "Summertime Blues" |
| Stevie Nicks | "Rooms on Fire" |
| Harry Nilsson | "Everybody's Talkin'" |
| Nitty Gritty Dirt Band (as The Dirt Band) | "An American Dream" |
| Kenny Nolan | "I Like Dreamin'" |
| Chris Norman | "Midnight Lady"; "Some Hearts Are Diamonds"; "Stumblin' In" |

== O ==
| Artist | Song(s) |
|---|---|
| Gilbert O'Sullivan | "Alone Again (Naturally)" |
| Orleans | "Dance with Me"; "Still the One" |

== P ==
| Artist | Song(s) |
|---|---|
| Pablo Cruise | "Love Will Find a Way"; "Cool Love" |
| Jim Photoglo | |
| Pilot | "January" |
| Player | "Baby Come Back" |
| Poco | "Heart of the Night" |

== R ==
| Artist | Song(s) |
|---|---|
| Gerry Rafferty | "Baker Street"; "Home and Dry" |
| Chris Rea | "Ace of Hearts"; "Auberge"; "Fool (If You Think It's Over)"; "The Road to Hell"; "Winning"; "Wired to the Moon" |
| Helen Reddy | "Ain't No Way to Treat a Lady"; "I Am Woman"; "I Can't Hear You No More" |
| REO Speedwagon | "Keep On Loving You"; "Can't Fight This Feeling" |
| Lionel Richie | "All Night Long (All Night)"; "Endless Love" (with Diana Ross); "Hello" |
| Linda Ronstadt | "Don't Know Much" (with Aaron Neville); "When Will I Be Loved"; "You're No Good" |
| Gavin Rossdale | "Love Remains the Same" |
| Todd Rundgren | "Can We Still Be Friends"; "A Dream Goes On Forever"; "Hello It's Me"; "I Saw the Light"; "Take It All" |
| Jaimin Rajani | |

== S ==
| Artist | Song(s) |
|---|---|
| Sad Café | |
| Leo Sayer | "When I Need You" |
| Boz Scaggs | "Lido Shuffle"; "Lowdown" |
| Seals and Crofts | "Summer Breeze"; "Diamond Girl"; "Get Closer" |
| Bob Seger | "Against the Wind"; "Night Moves"; "Still the Same" |
Ed Sheeran
| Simon & Garfunkel | "Bridge over Troubled Water" |
| Carly Simon | "Mockingbird" (with James Taylor); "That's the Way I've Always Heard It Should Be"; "You're So Vain" |
| Paul Simon | "Slip Slidin' Away" |
| Smokie | |
| Southern Sons | |
| JD Souther | |
| Starbuck | "Moonlight Feels Right" |
| Starland Vocal Band | "Afternoon Delight" |
| Stealers Wheel | "Stuck in the Middle with You" |
| Steely Dan | "Do It Again"; "Hey Nineteen"; "Peg"; "Rikki Don't Lose That Number" |
| Cat Stevens | "Peace Train" |
| Al Stewart | "Time Passages"; "Year of the Cat" |
| John Stewart | |
| Rod Stewart | "Downtown Train"; "I Don't Want to Talk About It"; "I Was Only Joking"; "Mandolin Wind"; "Sailing"; "Tonight's the Night (Gonna Be Alright)" |
| Sting | "Desert Rose"; "They Dance Alone" |
| Curtis Stigers | "I Wonder Why"; "You're All That Matters to Me" |
| Styx | "Babe"; "Don't Let It End" |
| Supertramp | "Give a Little Bit" |
| The Sutherland Brothers & Quiver | |

== T ==
| Artist | Song(s) |
|---|---|
| James Taylor | "Country Road"; "Fire and Rain"; "How Sweet It Is (To Be Loved by You); "Shower the People"; "Sweet Baby James"; "Your Smiling Face |
| B. J. Thomas | "Everybody's Out of Town"; "I Just Can't Help Believing"; "No Love at All"; "Rock and Roll Lullaby" |
| Three Dog Night | |
| Toby Beau | "My Angel Baby |
| Toto | "Africa"; "I'll Be over You"; "I Won't Hold You Back"; "Rosanna" |
| Bonnie Tyler | "Believe in Me" |

== V ==
| Artist | Song(s) |
|---|---|
| Gino Vannelli | "I Just Wanna Stop"; "Living Inside Myself" |
| Randy VanWarmer | "Just When I Needed You Most" |

== W ==
| Artist | Song(s) |
|---|---|
| Bob Welch | "Sentimental Lady" |
| Wet Wet Wet | |
| Snowy White | "Bird of Paradise" |
| Wings | "Live and Let Die"; "London Town"; "Must Do Something About It"; "With a Little Luck" |
| Steve Winwood | "Higher Love" |
| Gary Wright | "Dream Weaver" |

== Y ==
| Artist | Song(s) |
|---|---|
| Neil Young | "A Man Needs a Maid"; "Heart of Gold" |

== See also ==
- Category:Soft rock songs
- Yacht rock
