= Paint My Love =

Paint My Love may refer to:

- Paint My Love - Greatest Hits, a 1996 compilation album by Michael Learns to Rock
- "Paint My Love" (song), a 1997 song by Michael Learns to Rock
