= MLTR =

MLTR may refer to:

- Michael Learns to Rock
- MLTR (album)
- My Life as a Teenage Robot
