= Scandinavia (album) =

Studio album by Michael Learns to Rock
- Released: June 11, 2012
- Recorded: Gaiatone Studio, Gothenburg, Sweden
- Genre: Pop rock, soft rock
- Label: Sony Music/MLTR Music; WMG (Southeast Asia & Hong Kong); Virgin (India)
- Producer: Mikkel Lentz

Michael Learns to Rock chronology
Eternity (2008)	Scandinavia (2012)	25: The Complete Singles (2014)

Singles from Scandinavia
- 1. "Renovate My Life" Released: June 1, 2012; 2. "Any Way You Want It" Released: June 11, 2012; 3. "Please Forgive Me" Released: 2013

Scandinavia is the eighth studio album by the Danish soft rock band Michael Learns to Rock. It was released on June 11, 2012. It was the first album to be solely produced by the guitarist Mikkel Lentz, who had produced most of the band's previous album, Eternity (2008).

The track "Any Way You Want It" appeared on music charts in Indonesia, India and Denmark. The album received mostly positive reviews from critics. The album fared well in India and in other South Asian countries.

== Track listing ==
All tracks are written by Jascha Richter; except "Shanghaid in Tokyo" music by Mikkel Lentz, and lyrics by Lentz and Marcus Winther-John.

No.	Title	Length
1.	"Renovate My Life"	4:25
2.	"Any Way You Want It"	3:44
3.	"Space Commander"	3:55
4.	"Heaven Is My Alibi"	3:50
5.	"Please Forgive Me"	4:16
6.	"Hanging On"	4:06
7.	"Shanghaid in Tokyo"	3:52
8.	"Crazy World"	4:23
9.	"Make Me Feel"	3:38
10.	"Icebreaker"	3:30
11.	"Scandinavia"	3:49

== Charts ==
Charts (2012)	Peak position
Denmark Albums Top 40	19
