= Nothing to Lose (Michael Learns to Rock album) =

Studio album by Michael Learns to Rock
- Released: September 12, 1997
- Recorded: 1995–1996 in Aarhus (MLTR Studio) and Copenhagen (Grapehouse Studio, Peter Mark Studio, Elsound Studio)
- Studios: MLTR Studio, Peter Mark Studio, Grapehouse Studio, Elsound Studio
- Genres: Soft rock, pop rock
- Labels: MLTR Music, Medley, Warner Music
- Producers: Michael Learns to Rock, Oli Poulsen

Michael Learns to Rock chronology
| Paint My Love (1996) | Nothing to Lose (1997) | MLTR (1999) |

Singles from Nothing to Lose
- 1. "Paint My Love" Released: October 16, 1996; 2. "Breaking My Heart" Released: August 1, 1997; 3. "Something You Should Know" Released: August 29, 1997; 4. "I'm Gonna Be Around" Released: September 3, 1997; 5. "Nothing to Lose" Released: January 5, 1998; 6. "Forever and a Day" Released: May 3, 1998

Nothing to Lose is the fourth studio album of the Danish soft rock band Michael Learns to Rock. It was released on September 12, 1997, by Medley Records in Denmark. Like the previous album, Played on Pepper (1995), it was mainly produced by the band itself. Guitar player Mikkel Lentz said the band programmed new beats during the mixing process as they wanted to experiment a bit more with this album. While the band's previous albums relied heavily on soft rock ballads, Nothing to Lose contains a rockier sound intended to suit the European market.

In Denmark, Nothing to Lose sold 25,000 copies on the day of release. In May 1998, the album had sold 500,000 copies worldwide, with 70,000 copies sold in Denmark.

The fourth single, "I'm Gonna Be Around" was re-produced by Per Magnusson and David Kreuger for its single release. The song was "written especially for the United States" according to lead singer Jascha Richter. It was later included on the compilation album MLTR (1999). It is the last studio album to feature bassist Søren Madsen, who left the band three years later.

== Track listing ==
| No. | Title | Writer(s) | Producer(s) | Length |
|---|---|---|---|---|
| 1. | "I'm Gonna Be Around" | Jascha Richter, Oli Poulsen, Ashley Mulford | Oli Poulsen | 4:18 |
| 2. | "Something You Should Know" | Richter, Mulford | Michael Learns to Rock | 3:39 |
| 3. | "Animals" | Richter, Mulford | Michael Learns to Rock | 4:57 |
| 4. | "Nothing to Lose" | Richter | Michael Learns to Rock | 3:56 |
| 5. | "Magic" | Søren Madsen, Mulford | Michael Learns to Rock | 4:08 |
| 6. | "Everything I Planned" | Richter, Mulford | Michael Learns to Rock | 4:02 |
| 7. | "Paint My Love" | Richter | Michael Learns to Rock | 3:47 |
| 8. | "Romantic Balcony" | Richter | Michael Learns to Rock | 5:05 |
| 9. | "Party" | Richter | Michael Learns to Rock | 4:31 |
| 10. | "Breaking My Heart" | Richter | Michael Learns to Rock | 4:03 |
| 11. | "A Different Song" | Richter | Michael Learns to Rock | 4:16 |
| 12. | "Forever and a Day" | Richter, Mulford | Michael Learns to Rock | 3:18 |

European re-release bonus track
| No. | Title | Writer(s) | Producer(s) | Length |
|---|---|---|---|---|
| 13. | "I'm Gonna Be Around" (radio version) | Richter, Poulsen, Mulford | Per Magnusson, David Kreuger | 3:43 |

Japanese edition
| No. | Title | Writer(s) | Producer(s) | Length |
|---|---|---|---|---|
| 1. | "I'm Gonna Be Around" | Richter, Poulsen, Mulford | Poulsen | 4:19 |
| 2. | "Something You Should Know" | Richter, Mulford | Michael Learns to Rock | 3:39 |
| 3. | "Animals" | Richter, Mulford | Michael Learns to Rock | 4:57 |
| 4. | "Nothing to Lose" | Richter | Michael Learns to Rock | 3:55 |
| 5. | "Magic" | Søren Madsen, Mulford | Michael Learns to Rock | 4:07 |
| 6. | "Everything I Planned" | Richter, Mulford | Michael Learns to Rock | 4:02 |
| 7. | "Forever and a Day" | Richter, Mulford | Michael Learns to Rock | 3:18 |
| 8. | "Romantic Balcony" | Richter | Michael Learns to Rock | 5:00 |
| 9. | "Party" | Richter | Michael Learns to Rock | 4:31 |
| 10. | "Every Day" | Søren Madsen, Tamra Rosanes | Michael Learns to Rock | 3:22 |
| 11. | "A Different Song" | Richter | Michael Learns to Rock | 4:15 |

2014 remastered edition bonus tracks
| No. | Title | Length |
|---|---|---|
| 13. | "Paint My Love" (acoustic version) | 3:49 |
| 14. | "Breaking My Heart" (alternative version) | 3:57 |
| 15. | "Every Day" (bonus track) (Japan edt.) | 3:24 |
| 16. | "I'm Gonna Be Around" (acoustic demo) | 2:35 |
| 17. | "Forever and a Day" (demo) | 3:13 |
| 18. | "Something You Should Know" (band mix 2) | 3:46 |
| 19. | "Romantic Balcony" (from Secrets, 1988) | 4:34 |

== Certifications and sales ==
| Region | Certification | Certified units/sales |
|---|---|---|
| Denmark | — | 70,000 |
| Hong Kong (IFPI Hong Kong) | Platinum | 20,000^{*} |
Summaries
| Southeast Asia | — | 800,000 |
^{*} Sales figures based on certification alone.
