= Breaking the Rules =

Breaking the Rules may refer to:

- Breaking the Rules (song), a 1983 song by English post-punk band Ludus
- Breaking the Rules (film), a 1992 American drama film
- "Breaking the Rules", a 1995 song by Michael Learns to Rock from Played on Pepper
- "Breaking the Rules", a 1981 song by AC/DC from For Those About to Rock We Salute You
