= Myk Gordon =

Canadian singer-songwriter

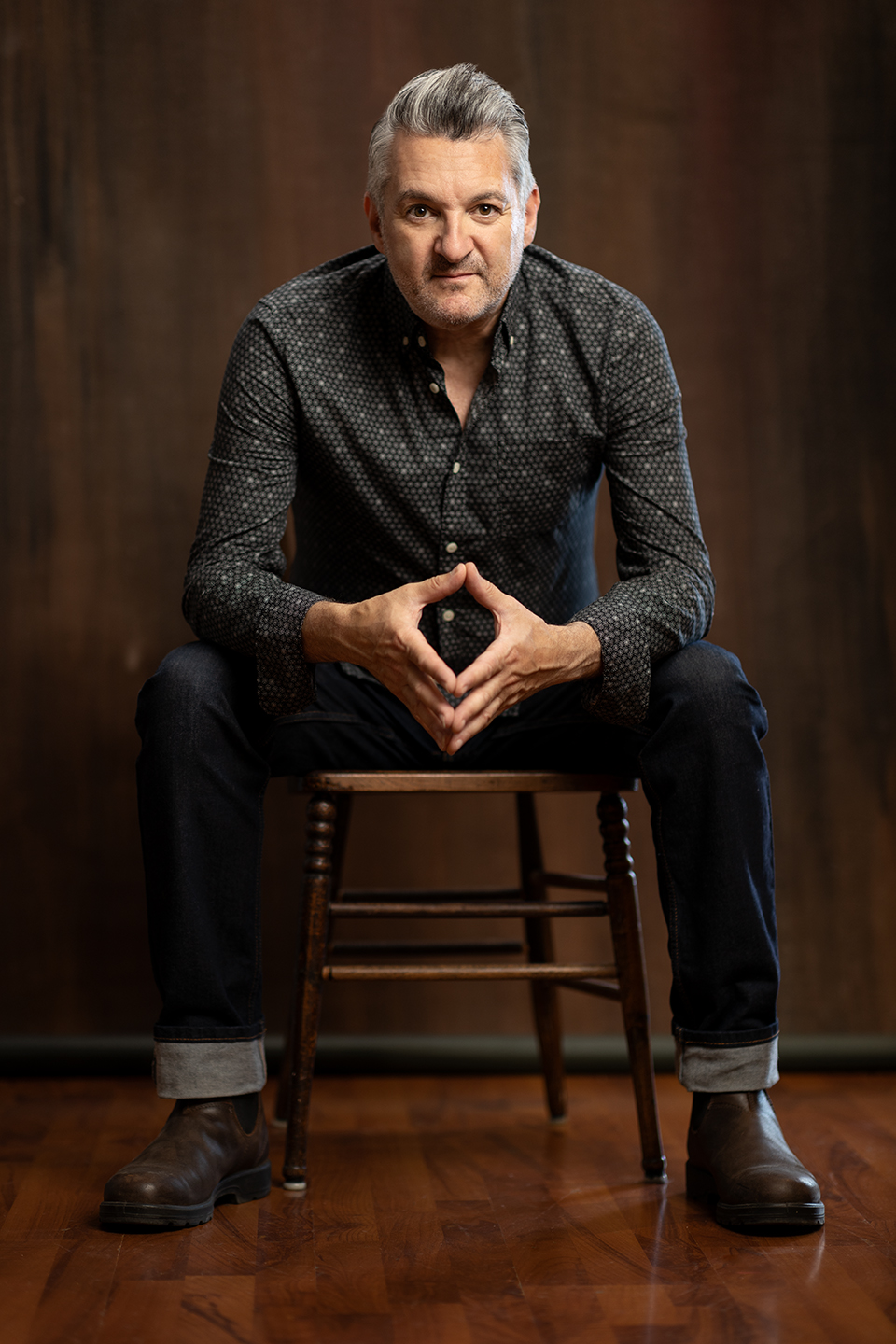

Background information
- Origin: Vancouver, Canada
- Genres: Americana; adult album alternative
- Occupations: Singer; songwriter
- Instruments: Singing, guitar, keyboards
- Years active: 1986–present
- Label: Go/NoGo Records
- Website: mykgordon.com

Myk Gordon is a Canadian singer-songwriter and recording artist based in Vancouver, BC. Gordon has drawn comparisons with Elvis Costello, Crowded House, Nick Lowe, and Bruce Springsteen, and is associated with the Americana and AAA radio genres.

== Biography ==
Gordon grew up in Vancouver, BC, and his father had a brief early career as a jazz bassist, with the latter's sister also being a concert pianist/prodigy. He was influenced at a young age by his family's tastes in music, including singer-songwriters Jim Croce, Cat Stevens, Richie Havens, Jesse Winchester, Carole King, west coast Jazz, 60s rock and roll, rock operas like Tommy, Hair and Jesus Christ Superstar, and folk and classical music (particularly Bach).

In 2008 Gordon began an ongoing collaboration with multiple Grammy-winning producer Steve Berlin. Their first effort, Set Free (2009), was released independently to rave reviews, and featured drummer Drew Shoals and another ongoing collaboration with fellow Vancouver guitarist Paul Rigby (from Neko Case, Jakob Dylan). No Depression reported: "Myk Gordon’s warm and resonant Set Free, is a testament to both the production expertise of Los Lobos’ Steve Berlin and the humble virtuosity of Gordon and his band. Recorded in Portland, Oregon with echos of everything from southwestern border-town flavor to NYC song circle sophistication, Set Free is a cast iron pot of homemade gumbo, bubbling and churning with rich layers of rootsy goodness." The Vancouver Sun hailed the album as "nothing short of a country-soul tour de force...loose and effortless."

In 2023 Gordon again collaborated with Berlin resulting in the 2024 album Born to Be, featuring members of Neko Case, New Pornographers, NRBQ, Mavis Staples and bassist Damian Erskine, nephew of jazz drummer Pete Erskine. Music blogger Darryl Sterdan called the single 'Brand New Love' "...an Americana-tinged pop-rocker whose buoyant mood and sharp lyrics are reminiscent of Nick Lowe at his most sincere and romantic."

Gordon released his third collaboration with Berlin in November 2025 with the full-length pop-rock album The Future Is Now which he co-produced with Berlin, again featuring Rigby along with past band members of Bryan Adams and kd lang. The first single "Dare" was released on September 30, 2025.

== Discography ==
- Gordon, Myk; et al. (Steve Berlin (producer)) (2009), Set Free (CD, digital release), Boundless Music
- Gordon, Myk; et al. (Steve Berlin (producer)) (January 2024), Born To Be, Go/NoGo Records
- Gordon, Myk; et al. (Steve Berlin (co-producer)) (November 2025), The Future Is Now, Go/NoGo Records

== See also ==
- List of adult alternative artists
