= Ghost of You (disambiguation) =

"Ghost of You" is a 2022 song by the British singer-songwriter Mimi Webb.

(The) Ghost of You may also refer to:

- "Ghost of You", a 2018 song by 5 Seconds of Summer from the album Youngblood
- "Ghost of You", a 2020 song by Outline in Color
- "Ghost of You", a 2010 song by Selena Gomez & the Scene from the album A Year Without Rain
- "The Ghost of You", a 2005 song by My Chemical Romance
- "The Ghost of You", a 2017 song by Caro Emerald from the EP Emerald Island
- "The Ghost of You", a 2002 song by Good Charlotte from the album The Chronicles of Life and Death
- "The Ghost of You", a 2001 song by Michael Learns to Rock from the album 19 Love Ballads

== See also ==
- "Ghosts of You", a 2006 song by Chantal Kreviazuk from the album Ghost Stories
