= Still (Michael Learns to Rock album) =

Studio album by Michael Learns to Rock
- Released: 21 March 2018
- Recorded: 2016–2018
- Genre: Pop rock, soft rock
- Length: 36:54
- Label: MLTR Music
- Producer: Søren Mikkelsen

Michael Learns to Rock chronology
25: The Complete Singles (2014)	Still (2018)	A Life To Remember

Singles from Still
- 1. "Everything You Need" Released: 2 February 2018; 2. "Hold on a Minute" Released: 22 March 2018; 3. "Hiding Away from Life" Released: 20 June 2018

Still (stylized in all caps) is the ninth studio album by Danish soft rock band Michael Learns to Rock. It was released digitally on 21 March 2018 and in limited physical copies two weeks later on 4 April 2018.

== Development ==
The band had been working on their new record over the course of 2017 and into early 2018. In late January 2018, the band organized a competition over their social media platforms for the title of their upcoming album. Over the course of the week, they released the titles of the songs slated to be released through their new record. On 2 February 2018 the band released a new single titled “Everything You Need”.

After the contest, the band announced its winner, as well as the title of their ninth studio album, STILL. Released on 21 March 2018 through digital music platforms and on limited physical copies, the album features songs that sound like “Michael Learns to Rock but [it] sounds like today,” according to Wanscher.

== Track listing ==
All tracks are written by Jascha Richter; except "The Best of Me" music written by Richter and lyrics written by Natalie Sloth Richter; and "One Last Summer Night" written by Marcus Winther-John

No.	Title	Length
1.	"Everything You Need"	3:47
2.	"The Best of Me"	3:12
3.	"You'll Be Mine"	3:34
4.	"When I Look Around"	3:34
5.	"Hiding Away from Life"	3:36
6.	"Hold on a Minute"	4:09
7.	"When Wrong Is Right"	3:54
8.	"One Last Summer Night"	3:17
9.	"Stranger in My Heart"	3:23
10.	"Unconcerned"	4:28
Total length:		36:54
