= Welcome M1LL10NS =

2018 Indian suspense thriller film

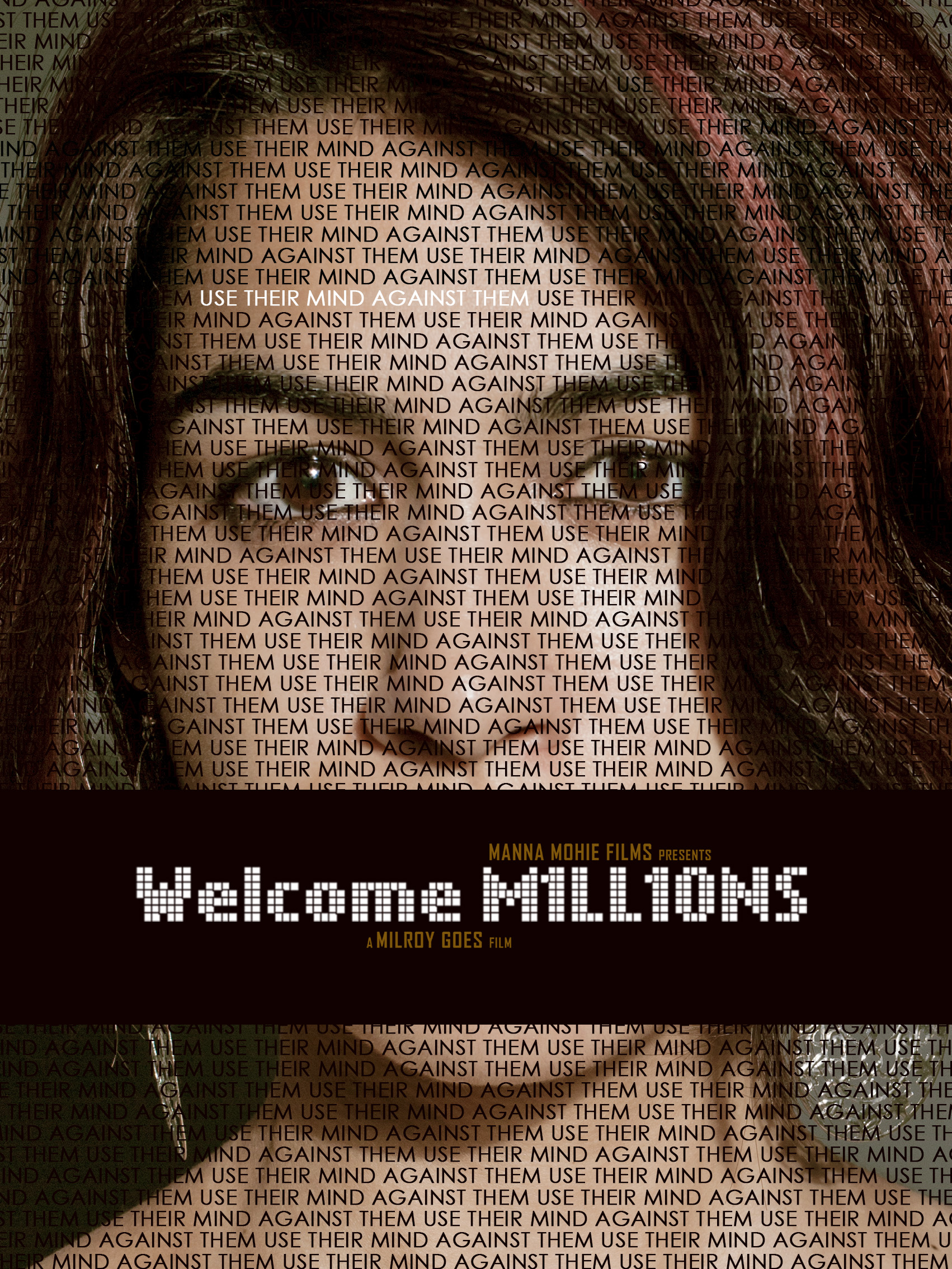
- Amazon Prime Release
- Directed by: Milroy Goés
- Written by: Milroy Goes
- Screenplay by: Milroy Goes; Stephen Lawrence Rebello
- Produced by: Manna Mohie; Milroy Goés
- Starring: Razak Khan; Joanne Da Cunha; Sohan Borcar; Les Menezes; Angela Dsouza; Manna Mohie; Kathryn Michelle; Comedian Selvy
- Cinematography: Yash Sawant
- Edited by: Yash Sawant
- Music by: Mikkel Lentz; Kishan Mohan
- Release date: 30 November 2018 (Los Angeles)
- Running time: 120 minutes
- Country: India
- Languages: Hindi; English; Konkani; Punjabi

Welcome M1LL10NS, also known as WELCOME MILLIONS, is a 2018 Indian suspense thriller film directed and written by Milroy Goes and produced by Manna Mohie under Manna Mohie Films. The film was shot and is set in Goa and tells of the journey of a lazy cop finding a smart criminal. The victim suffers the aftermath, hoping to someday get justice. It is a multi-lingual film featuring Joanne Da Cunha, Sohan Borcar, Les Menezes, and Manna Mohie. It has a post-credit scene filmed in Los Angeles featuring American actress Kathryn Michelle.

The film was Razak Khan's last film. the actor died soon after completing the film shoot in Goa in 2016. The film was released in Laemmle's Music Hall in Los Angeles, United States and was eligible for the 91st Academy Awards, but was not nominated in any categories.

== Plot ==
Alfred D'souza's life changes because of money. A year before the demonetization that hit India, D'souza is living in a small town, Cuncolim, in Goa, India. He is consumed by his dreams of being rich, but finds himself caught up in a lottery fraud. Due to the backward nature of the Goa cyber crime department his case was closed. A corrupt cop must find a way to reopen the case.

== Soundtrack ==
Kishan Mohan of Sapthaa Records in Kochi, Kerala and Mikkel Lentz from Denmark of Michael Learns to Rock, a Danish soft rock band, have contributed to background score and also featuring their song "It's Gonna Make Sense." The promotional song for commercial release is "Welcome Millions" written, composed and sung by Amaan Sheikh and Shashaa Tirupati featuring Raj Shinde. Vinick produced the EDM song.
