= Eternity (Michael Learns to Rock album) =

Studio album by Michael Learns to Rock
- Released: October 27, 2008
- Recorded: 2006–08
- Genre: Pop rock, soft rock
- Label: MLTR, At:tack
- Producer: Mikkel Lentz, Johan Bejerholm, Top Notch Music

Michael Learns to Rock chronology
Michael Learns to Rock (2004)	Eternity (2008)	Scandinavia (2012)

Singles from Eternity
- 1. "When Tomorrow Comes" Released: June 27, 2008; 2. "Sweetest Surprise" Released: September 22, 2008; 3. "It's Gonna Make Sense" Released: 2009

Alternative album cover
- Eternity & Beyond edition

Eternity is the seventh studio album by Danish soft rock band Michael Learns to Rock. It was released on October 27, 2008 through MLTR Music and At:tack Music. This is the first Michael Learns to Rock album primarily produced by Mikkel Lentz.

"Family Tree" was previously recorded by Danish pop duo Brother+Sister for their second album, Sonny vs. Gigi in 2002. The song "It's Gonna Make Sense" was a very popular hit in the Philippines since this was the trademark song for every eviction in Pinoy Big Brother: Double Up, and in India, it featured on the soundtrack to the Indian film Welcome M1LL10NS. The song "Sweetest Surprise" reached number one in Thailand.

== Track listing ==
No.	Title	Lyrics	Music	Producer(s)	Length
1.	"When Tomorrow Comes"	Rune Braager, Lise Cabble, Trine Jepsen	Braager, Cabble, Jepsen	Mikkel Lentz	3:31
2.	"It's Gonna Make Sense"	Daniel Heløy Davidsen, Kaare Thøgersen, Peter Wallevik	Davidsen, Thøgersen, Wallevik	Mikkel Lentz	3:35
3.	"Shadow Side of Me"	Pamela Phillips	Jascha Richter	Mikkel Lentz	4:00
4.	"You Want More"	Richter	Richter	Mikkel Lentz	4:21
5.	"Sweetest Surprise"	Marcus Winther-John	Winther-John	Mikkel Lentz	3:10
6.	"Family Tree"	Richter	Richter	Top Notch Music	4:04
7.	"I Do"	Lene Dissing, Sune Haansbæk	Dissing, Haansbæk	Mikkel Lentz	4:03
8.	"Look Around"	Winther-John	Richter	Mikkel Lentz	3:48
9.	"The War Is Not Over"	Mārtiņš Freimanis	Freimanis	Mikkel Lentz	3:00
10.	"Lonely Satellite"	Winther-John	Winther-John	Johan Bejerholm	3:26
11.	"Walk with Me"	Richter	Richter	Mikkel Lentz	4:05
12.	"Eternity"		Mikkel Lentz, Chief 1, Richter	Mikkel Lentz	5:58

=== Eternity & Beyond ===
Disc 2: Greatest Hits
No.	Title	Length
1.	"That's Why You Go Away"
2.	"Take Me to Your Heart"
3.	"Paint My Love"
4.	"You Took My Heart Away"
5.	"The Actor"
6.	"Sleeping Child"
7.	"25 Minutes"
8.	"Someday"
9.	"More Than a Friend"
10.	"Complicated Heart"
11.	"Angel Eyes"
12.	"The Ghost of You"
13.	"Out of the Blue"
14.	"How Many Hours"
15.	"It's Only Love"

== Charts ==
Chart (2008)	Peak position
Danish Albums Chart	22
