= List of adult alternative artists =

The following lists bands or artists that are played on adult album alternative radio stations, or have been cited as part of the adult alternative pop/rock music genre.

== 0-9 ==
- .38 Special
- 10,000 Maniacs
- 10cc
- The B-52's

== A ==
- A Flock of Seagulls
- A Tribe Called Quest
- A-ha
- ABBA
- ABC
- AC/DC
- Ryan Adams
- Adele
- The Airborne Toxic Event
- Alberta Cross
- Alice In Chains
- Alice Cooper
- Lily Allen
- All American Rejects
- The Allman Brothers Band
- Gregg Allman
- Girls Aloud
- Aly & AJ
- AJR
- alt-J
- Ambrosia
- American Authors
- Tori Amos
- Anderson Paak
- The Angels
- The Animals
- Fiona Apple
- Aqualung
- Arcade Fire
- Tasmin Archer
- Arctic Monkeys
- Jann Arden
- Arlo Parks
- Louis Armstrong
- Joseph Arthur
- Ásgeir
- Asia
- Asleep at the Wheel
- Assembly of Dust
- Nicole Atkins
- Atlas Genius
- Augustana
- The Avett Brothers

== B ==
- Bachman-Turner Overdrive
- Badfinger
- Badly Drawn Boy
- Bahamas
- Bakar
- Bananarama
- The Band
- Dazz Band
- The Bangles
- Band of Horses
- Sara Bareilles
- Barenaked Ladies
- The Baseball Project
- Bear Hands
- The Beach Boys
- Beastie Boys
- The Beatles
- The Beautiful South
- Beck
- Howie Beck
- Jeff Beck
- Bee Gees
- The Bees / A Band of Bees
- Beirut
- Belle Brigade
- Ben Folds Five
- Chuck Berry
- Best Coast
- Better Than Ezra
- Beyoncé
- Big Head Todd & The Monsters
- Andrew Bird
- The Black Crowes
- The Black Keys
- The Black Eyed Peas
- Black Pumas
- Blessid Union of Souls
- Björk
- Aloe Blacc
- James Blake
- Blonde Redhead
- Blondie
- Blind Faith
- Blind Melon
- Blue Merle
- The Blue Nile
- Blue October
- Blue Öyster Cult
- Blue Rodeo
- Blues Traveler
- The Moody Blues
- James Blunt
- Blur
- Bon Iver
- Boozoo Bajou
- Børns
- Boston (band)
- Boy & Bear
- Boy Pablo
- Boygenius
- Butterfly Boucher
- David Bowie
- Charles Bradley
- The Bravery
- The Breeders
- Edie Brickell & the New Bohemians
- Broken Bells
- Leon Bridges
- Jonatha Brooke
- Meredith Brooks
- Marc Broussard
- James Brown
- Jackson Browne
- Michael Bublé
- Jeff Buckley
- Bully
- Kate Bush
- Bush (British band)
- John Butler Trio
- David Byrne
- The Byrds

== C ==
- Cage The Elephant
- Camila Cabello
- Carla Olson
- Caro Emerald
- Colbie Caillat
- Cake
- Carbon Leaf
- The Cardigans
- Mariah Carey
- Brandi Carlile
- Belinda Carlisle
- Vanessa Carlton
- Reeve Carney
- The Cars
- Neko Case
- Johnny Cash
- Chance the Rapper
- Tracy Chapman
- Chicago
- The Chicks
- Toni Childs
- The Church
- The Civil Wars
- Clairo
- Eric Clapton
- Gary Clark, Jr.
- Guy Clark
- The Clash
- Kelly Clarkson
- Tom Cochrane
- Bruce Cockburn
- Joe Cocker
- Marc Cohn
- Cold War Kids
- Coldplay
- Jude Cole
- Lloyd Cole
- Paula Cole
- Collective Soul
- Phil Collins
- Shawn Colvin
- Bad Company
- The Corrs
- Matt Costa
- Elvis Costello
- Christopher Cross
- Chappell Roan
- Counting Crows
- Cowboy Junkies
- Cowboy Mouth
- Cracker
- The Cranberries
- Crash Test Dummies
- Cream (band)
- Creedence Clearwater Revival
- King Crimson
- Crosby, Stills, Nash & Young
- Sheryl Crow
- Crowded House
- Mötley Crüe
- Ice Cube
- Jim Cuddy
- Cuff the Duke
- Jamie Cullum
- The Cure
- Cypress Hill
- Billy Ray Cyrus
- Miley Cyrus

== D ==
- Daft Punk
- The Dandy Warhols
- Vanessa Daou
- Dave Matthews Band
- Dave Clark Five
- Paul Davis
- Dawes
- Howie Day
- dc Talk
- De La Soul
- Dead or Alive
- Deadmau5
- Death Cab for Cutie
- The Decemberists
- Def Leppard
- Gavin DeGraw
- Del Amitri
- Demillusion
- Lana Del Rey
- Delta Spirit
- Rocco DeLuca
- Brett Dennen
- Depeche Mode
- Derek & the Dominos
- Derek Trucks Band
- Destiny's Child
- Devo
- Dido
- Dinosaur Jr.
- Dire Straits
- Thomas Dolby
- Pussycat Dolls
- Doobie Brothers
- The Doors
- Luke Doucet
- Mike Doughty
- Nick Drake
- Drake
- Drive By Truckers
- Duran Duran
- Bob Dylan
- Jakob Dylan

== E ==
- The Eagles
- Justin Townes Earle
- Earth, Wind & Fire
- Anderson East
- Echo & the Bunnymen
- Echosmith
- EDEN
- Edward Sharpe and the Magnetic Zeros
- Kathleen Edwards
- Eels
- Mark Eitzel
- Billie Eilish
- Elephant Stone
- Elliphant
- Eminem
- Enya
- Melissa Etheridge
- Sharon Van Etten
- Europe
- Eurythmics
- Evanescence
- George Ezra

== F ==
- Faces
- Small Faces
- Donald Fagen
- Fair to Midland
- The Fall of Troy
- Fall Out Boy
- Family of the Year
- Fanfarlo
- Fastball
- Fatboy Slim
- Feist
- Fergie
- Rebecca Ferguson
- Filter
- A Fine Frenzy
- Finn Brothers
- Craig Finn
- Neil Finn
- First Aid Kit
- Jeremy Fisher
- Fitz and the Tantrums
- Ella Fitzgerald
- Five for Fighting
- The Fixx
- The Flaming Lips
- Fleet Foxes
- Fleetwood Mac
- Flight of the Conchords
- Florence & the Machine
- John Fogerty
- Ben Folds
- Fontaines D.C.
- David Ford
- Foreigner
- Foo Fighters
- Julia Fordham
- Foster the People
- Four Tops
- Donavon Frankenreiter
- Aretha Franklin
- Michael Franti & Spearhead
- Franz Ferdinand
- The Fray
- Freddy Fresh
- Free
- Fun.

== G ==
- G. Love & Special Sauce
- Peter Gabriel
- Lady Gaga
- The Gap Band
- Garbage
- Art Garfunkel
- Jack Garratt
- Marvin Gaye
- Genesis
- Andy Gibb
- Gin Blossoms
- Givers
- Glass Animals
- Donald Glover
- Gnarls Barkley
- Goldfrapp
- Gomez
- The Go-Gos
- Goo Goo Dolls
- Myk Gordon
- Gorillaz
- Gotye
- Ellie Goulding
- Grace Potter & the Nocturnals
- Graffiti6
- Andy Grammer
- Grand Funk Railroad
- Jenn Grant
- Grant Lee Buffalo
- Grateful Dead
- David Gray
- Great Lake Swimmers
- Al Green
- Green Day
- The Greg Kihn Band
- Patty Griffin
- Grizzly Bear
- Grouplove
- The Growlers
- Guns N' Roses
- Guster

== H ==
- Trevor Hall
- Hall & Oates
- Halsey
- Ernie Halter
- Sarah Harmer
- Fifth Harmony
- Ben Harper
- George Harrison
- PJ Harvey
- Juliana Hatfield
- Mayer Hawthorne
- Warren Haynes
- Heart
- The Head and the Heart
- Heartless Bastards
- The Jimi Hendrix Experience
- Joe Henry
- Kristin Hersh
- Katie Herzig
- John Hiatt
- Missy Higgins
- Lauryn Hill
- Hockey
- The Hollies
- Buddy Holly
- Hootie & the Blowfish
- Hooverphonic
- Bruce Hornsby
- House Of Pain
- Howlin Maggie
- The Human League
- Van Hunt
- Hurray for the Riff Raff
- Eric Hutchinson

== I ==
- Icon for Hire
- Idles
- Billy Idol
- Iggy Pop
- iLoveMakonnen
- Imagine Dragons
- Natalie Imbruglia
- Incubus
- Indigo Girls
- The Innocence Mission
- Interpol
- INXS
- Iron & Wine
- Chris Isaak
- Jason Isbell
- Islands
- Ivy

== J ==
- Jet
- Joan Jett
- Joe Jackson
- Michael Jackson
- Janet Jackson
- The Jam
- Pearl Jam
- Ram Jam
- James
- James Gang
- Jason Mraz
- Rick James
- John Mayer
- Tommy James & The Shondells
- Jamiroquai
- Sarah Jarosz
- Jars of Clay
- The Jayhawks
- Jem
- Jewel
- Billy Joel
- Elton John
- Jack Johnson
- Freedy Johnston
- Norah Jones
- Janis Joplin
- Journey
- Joy Division
- Bon Jovi
- Vance Joy
- Judybats
- Damien Jurado
- Hobo Johnson

== K ==
- Kaleo
- Israel Kamakawiwoʻole
- Kansas
- Keane
- Mat Kearney
- Keb' Mo
- Paul Kelly
- Kendrick Lamar
- Khruangbin
- The Killers
- B.B. King
- Kings of Leon
- The Kinks
- Kiss
- Michael Kiwanuka
- Jann Klose
- Mark Knopfler
- Kool & the Gang
- The Kooks
- Kopecky
- Kraftwerk
- Lenny Kravitz
- Chantal Kreviazuk

== L ==
- Lady A.
- Lake Street Dive
- Miranda Lambert
- Ray LaMontagne
- Land of Talk
- k.d. lang
- Daniel Lanois
- Greg Laswell
- Cyndi Lauper
- LCD Soundsystem
- Led Zeppelin
- Amos Lee
- Amy Lee
- The Lemonheads
- John Lennon
- Julian Lennon
- Sondre Lerche
- Lifehouse
- Lighthouse Family
- Lightning Seeds
- Linkin Park
- Lissie
- Little Dragon
- Los Lobos
- Local Natives
- Lisa Loeb
- Lizzo
- Los Lonely Boys
- Jennifer Lopez
- Mary Lou Lord
- Lorde
- Loverboy
- Lyle Lovett
- Low Millions
- Nick Lowe
- The Lumineers
- Les Luthiers
- Jeff Lynne
- Shelby Lynne
- Lynyrd Skynyrd

== M ==
- Madness
- Bob Marley
- Martha and the Vandellas
- Marvellettes
- Massive Attack
- John Mayall
- John Mayall & the Bluesbreakers
- Michael McDonald
- MC5
- M83
- Fleetwood Mac
- Meg Mac
- Magnet
- Tkay Maidza
- Matchbox Twenty
- Aimee Mann
- Manfred Mann
- Manfred Mann's Earth Band
- Marina and the Diamonds
- Mark Mallman
- Laura Marling
- Maroon 5
- Bruno Mars
- Wendy Matthews
- Imelda May
- John Mayer
- Matt Mays
- Mazzy Star
- Edwin McCain
- Erin McCarley
- Jesse McCartney
- Paul McCartney
- Melissa McClelland
- Kirsty MacColl
- Sarah McLachlan
- Megadeth
- John Mellencamp
- Katie Melua
- Maria Mena
- Shawn Mendes
- Natalie Merchant
- Metric
- MGMT
- Ingrid Michaelson
- Amy Millan
- Steve Miller Band
- Tor Miller
- Missing Persons
- Anaïs Mitchell
- Moby
- Modest Mouse
- Janelle Monáe
- The Monkees
- Montgomery Gentry
- Monsters of Folk
- Moon Taxi
- James Morrison
- Van Morrison
- Alanis Morissette
- Mother Mother
- Mötley Crüe
- Motörhead
- Smash Mouth
- Alison Moyet
- Melanie Martinez
- Jason Mraz
- Mudcrutch
- Maria Muldaur
- Shawn Mullins
- Mumford & Sons
- Muse
- Kacey Musgraves
- My Friend Steve
- My Morning Jacket
- Billie Myers
- Freddie Mercury

== N ==
- Nada Surf
- Leona Naess
- Anna Nalick
- Leigh Nash
- Matt Nathanson
- Needtobreathe
- The Neighbourhood
- New Order
- The New Pornographers
- The New Radicals
- Gary Numan
- Randy Newman
- Nickel Creek
- Willie Nelson
- Stevie Nicks
- Willie Nile
- Nirvana
- No Doubt
- Noah and the Whale
- Heather Nova
- Justin Nozuka
- Paolo Nutini

== O ==
- Oasis
- The Ocean Blue
- Sinéad O'Connor
- Of Monsters and Men
- O.A.R.
- Oingo Boingo
- OK Go
- Old 97's
- Angel Olsen
- One Eskimo
- OneRepublic
- Yoko Ono
- Plastic Ono Band
- Roy Orbison
- Electric Light Orchestra
- Orchestral Manoeuvres in the Dark
- Beth Orton
- Joan Osborne
- Our Lady Peace
- Outkast
- Buck Owens
- Owl City
- Ozzy Osbourne

== P ==
- P!nk
- Robert Palmer
- Panic! At The Disco
- Pantera
- Parachute
- Paramore
- Emerson Lake & Palmer
- Dolly Parton
- Pearl Jam
- Michael Penn
- Perfume Genius
- Carl Perkins
- Christina Perri
- Katy Perry
- Pet Shop Boys
- Peter Bjorn and John
- Tom Petty
- Liz Phair
- Phantogram
- Grant Lee Phillips
- Phillip Phillips
- Sam Phillips
- Wilson Phillips
- Phish
- Phoebe Bridgers
- Phoenix
- The Pierces
- The Pillbugs
- Pink Floyd
- Sex Pistols
- Pixies
- Plain White T's
- Robert Plant
- Plants and Animals
- Joel Plaskett
- Poe
- The Pogues
- The Pointer Sisters
- Poison
- Caroline Polachek
- The Police
- John Popper
- Willy Porter
- Portishead
- Portugal. The Man
- Elvis Presley
- Billy Preston
- Pretenders
- Judas Priest
- Prince
- Procol Harum
- The Proclaimers
- The Psychedelic Furs
- Public Enemy
- Punch Brothers
- Puppini Sisters
- Deep Purple

== Q ==
- Queen
- Queens of the Stone Age

== R ==
- R.E.M.
- REO Speedwagon
- Radiohead
- Rage Against the Machine
- Rainbow
- Bonnie Raitt
- Night Ranger
- Sugar Ray
- Chris Rea
- The Record Company
- Red Hot Chili Peppers
- Lou Reed
- The Replacements
- Chris Rice
- Rihanna
- Amy Rigby
- Rilo Kiley
- Little Richard
- Rise Against
- Justin Roberts
- Sam Roberts
- Robbie Robertson
- Smokey Robinson
- Kenny Rogers
- Rolling Stones
- My Chemical Romance
- Gavin Rossdale
- Josh Rouse
- Ronettes
- Roxette
- Run the Jewels
- Todd Rundgren
- Bic Runga
- Rush
- Rusted Root
- Run DMC
- Mitch Ryder
- Serena Ryder
- Rymes with Orange

== S ==
- Salt-N-Pepa
- San Cisco
- Savage Garden
- St. Paul and The Broken Bones
- Scars on 45
- Boz Scaggs
- Bob Schneider
- Travis Scott
- Seal
- Seether
- Bob Seger
- Ron Sexsmith
- Scorpions
- DJ Shadow
- Ryan Shaw
- Jules Shear
- Ed Sheeran
- Duncan Sheik
- Vonda Shepard
- Kenny Wayne Shepherd
- The Shins
- Jane Siberry
- Silversun Pickups
- Paul Simon
- Simple Minds
- Simple Plan
- Simply Red
- Frank Sinatra
- Nancy Sinatra
- Sister Hazel
- JoJo Siwa
- Sixpence None the Richer
- Sarah Slean
- Slipknot
- Elliott Smith
- Patti Smith Group
- Sam Smith
- The Smithereens
- The Smiths
- Sneaker Pimps
- Snow Patrol
- Jill Sobule
- Soccer Mommy
- Songhoy Blues
- Sonic Youth
- Sorry
- Soul Asylum
- Soul Coughing
- Regina Spektor
- Spencer Davis Group
- Spice Girls
- Spin Doctors
- Split Enz
- Spoon
- Sports Team
- Squeeze
- Buffalo Springfield
- Bruce Springsteen
- Gwen Stefani
- Hailee Steinfeld
- Steely Dan
- Stereolab
- Steve Miller Band
- Steve Winwood
- Rod Stewart
- Stickman
- Sting
- Joss Stone
- Stone Temple Pilots
- C. W. Stoneking
- The Stooges
- Ringo Starr
- The Strokes
- Sturgill Simpson
- The Strumbellas
- The Struts
- Styx
- The Sundays
- SuperHeavy
- Supertramp
- The Supremes
- Matthew Sweet
- The Swell Season
- Taylor Swift
- Sylvan Esso

== T ==
- Travis Barker
- T.I.
- Taco
- Talking Heads
- Tame Impala
- James Taylor
- Tears for Fears
- Tedeschi Trucks Band
- Teenage Fanclub
- Tegan and Sara
- Television
- The Telnyuk Sisters
- The Temptations
- Texas
- They Might Be Giants
- Third Eye Blind
- Thirty Seconds to Mars
- Thompson Twins
- Justin Timberlake
- Tired Pony
- Cal Tjader
- TLC
- Toad the Wet Sprocket
- Tommy Tutone
- Toots and the Maytals
- Tove Lo
- Traffic
- Train
- Meghan Trainor
- Trashcan Sinatras
- Travis
- Cheap Trick
- The Tubes
- KT Tunstall
- TV on the Radio
- Jeff Tweedy
- Twenty One Pilots
- Two Door Cinema Club
- Tyler, the Creator
- T. Rex

== U ==
- U.S. Girls
- Carrie Underwood
- U2
- Ultravox
- Umphrey's McGee

== V ==
- Vampire Weekend
- Van Ghost
- Van Halen
- Van Zant
- Keith Varon
- Eddie Vedder
- Suzanne Vega
- Laura Veirs
- Jackie Venson
- Gene Vincent
- The Velvet Underground
- Velvet Revolver
- Veruca Salt
- Vertical Horizon
- The Verve
- The Verve Pipe
- Kurt Vile
- Vintage Trouble
- En Vogue

== W ==
- The Wailin' Jennys
- Rufus Wainwright
- Tom Waits
- Walk the Moon
- The Wallflowers
- J Roddy Walston and the Business
- Wang Chung
- War
- ZZ Ward
- Washed Out
- The Waterboys
- Nick Waterhouse
- Waxahatchee
- The Weakerthans
- Ween
- The Weepies
- Weezer
- Paul Westerberg
- Jack White
- Whitesnake
- White Denim
- The White Stripes
- White Town
- The Guess Who
- The Who
- Traveling Wilburys
- Will I. Am
- Wilco
- Dar Williams
- Joy Williams
- Lucinda Williams
- Pharrell Williams
- Robbie Williams
- Victoria Williams
- Wings
- Amy Winehouse
- Edgar Winter Group
- Wolf Parade
- Joon Wolfsberg
- Bobby Womack
- Stevie Wonder
- Hawksley Workman
- World Party

== X ==
- X
- XTC
- The xx

== Y ==
- Yungblud
- Rachael Yamagata
- The Yardbirds
- Yeah Yeah Yeahs
- Yes
- Pete Yorn
- Young the Giant
- Neil Young

== Z ==
- Hindi Zahra
- Warren Zevon
- Zucchero Fornaciari
- ZZ Top
