= Adult album alternative =

Music radio format

Adult alternative
- Stylistic origins: Adult contemporary; pop rock; jangle pop; roots rock; folk rock; alternative rock; soft rock
- Cultural origins: 1980s

Other topics
- Freeform; album-oriented rock; adult hits; classic rock; classic hits

Adult album alternative (also triple-A, AAA, or adult alternative) is a radio format. Its roots trace to both the "classic album stations of the '70s as well as the alternative rock format that developed in the '80s." AAA programming is carried on more than 150 broadcast outlets in the United States, with a roughly even split between commercial and public stations.

== Format ==
The format covers a broader, more diverse playlist than most other formats. Musical selection tends to be on the fringe of mainstream pop and rock. It also includes many other music genres such as indie rock, Americana, pop rock, classic rock, alternative rock, new wave, alternative country, jazz, folk, world music, jam band and blues. The musical selections tend to avoid hard rock and rap music. Music selection also includes tracks from albums that are not singles, which leads to the enhanced and larger playlist. Some AAA outlets focus more on classic rock artists, folk and blues while others focus on more contemporary artists and modern/indie rock.

== Popularity ==
Some of the songs that first aired on the Triple-A format have later found additional popularity on the Adult Top 40, modern rock, or adult contemporary charts months after their initial Triple-A chart runs. The format is often seen as a "test market" for emerging artists.

The format has gone off and on in the Los Angeles radio market. Currently KCSN and simulcast partner KSBR broadcast a Triple A format in the Los Angeles and Orange County areas respectively. The format still exists in New York City (WFUV); Chicago (WXRT); Philadelphia (WXPN); Minneapolis (KCMP); Boston (WXRV, WERS, and Americana leaning WUMB-FM); Baltimore (WTMD); Aspen, Colorado (KSPN-FM); Ann Arbor, Michigan (WQKL); Boise, Idaho (KRVB); Denver (KBCO and KVOQ); Fort Collins (KJAC); Pittsburgh (WYEP); Astoria (KBGE); Bend (KLRR); Eugene (KRVM); Portland, Oregon (KINK); Portland, Maine (WCLZ); Indianapolis (WTTS); Nashville (WRLT, WNXP, and Americana leaning WMOT); Conway, New Hampshire (WMWV); Burlington, Vermont (WNCS); Seattle, Washington (KMIH); Spokane (KPND); Turners Falls-Northampton, Massachusetts (WRSI); Bozeman, Montana (KMMS-FM); Missoula, Montana (KDTR); Woodstock, New York (WDST); Austin (KGSR-HD2, KUTX, and KTSN); Columbia, Missouri (KBXR); and Dallas (KKXT). The now-defunct KFOG was a legendary Triple A station in the San Francisco Bay Area.

On July 10, 2008, Billboard began a Triple-A chart (using information from sister-publication Radio and Records, a news magazine devoted to the radio and the music industries that has since ceased publication). Rival Mediabase 24/7 also compiles a Triple A chart. As of mid-2009, Radio and Records publications and accompanying charts were discontinued. As of 2010, Billboard publishes Triple A charts in the magazine and for its premium members on its website. Mediabase also publishes Triple A charts on a daily basis.

Additional Triple-A charts were published by CMJ and FMQB (each now defunct). FMQB also produced the annual Triple A Conference in Boulder, Colorado, USA, an event that grew out of the Gavin Report's Triple A Summit, first held in 1993. FMQB took over production of the event, rebranding it as the Triple A Conference, after the closing of Radio & Records in 2009.

At the end of 2019, FMQB closed and all Triple A services were absorbed by Jack Barton Entertainment, LLC (JBE), helmed by Jack Barton, former VP/Triple A at FMQB. JBE has rebranded the Boulder convention as the Triple A SummitFest and continues to publish weekly Triple A charts, including a Non-Commercial album chart, as well as a weekly newsletter (JBE Triple A Report) covering Triple A radio and the music it plays.

== See also ==
- Active rock, a format that, similar to adult album alternative, features classic rock and contemporary rock, but with an emphasis on hard rock
- Adult Alternative Songs, also known as Triple A, a record chart published by Billboard
- Adult contemporary music (radio format), a format with a much more pop-oriented playlist, that is much softer and not too adventurous
- Album-oriented rock (FM radio format)
- List of adult alternative artists
- List of soft rock artists and songs
