= Wild Women (song) =

Single by the Danish soft rock band Michael Learns to Rock

Single by Michael Learns to Rock

from the album Colours
- B-side: "Complicated Heart"
- Released: 1993
- Recorded: July 1993
- Genre: Pop rock; alternative rock
- Length: 3:53 (album edit)
- Label: Cleveland International
- Songwriter: Jascha Richter
- Producers: Oli Poulsen; Michael Learns to Rock

Michael Learns to Rock singles chronology
"Sleeping Child" (1993)	"Wild Women" (1993)	"25 Minutes" (1994)

"Wild Women" is a song by Danish soft rock band Michael Learns to Rock, released as the second single from their 1993 album Colours. The song's lyrics deal with the theme of living a double life.

== Chart performance ==
"Wild Women" reached number 52 on the German charts, making it their greatest success in Germany.

== Live performances ==
During live performances, singer and keyboardist Jascha Richter often performs "Für Elise" on a classical piano before fading into the leitmotif of "Wild Women". In the band's London concert, Richter performed Beethoven's 5th Symphony on the electric keyboard before the band segued into "Wild Women".
