= Michael Learns to Rock (2004 album) =

Studio album by Michael Learns to Rock
- Released: February 9, 2004
- Recorded: February – September 2003
- Genre: Soft rock, pop rock
- Label: Medley
- Producer: Johan Bejerholm; Mats Berntoft; Chief 1; Moh Denebi; John Gordon; Nick Jarl; David Stenmarck; Johan Stentorp; Rune Westberg

Michael Learns to Rock chronology
19 Love Ballads (2001)	Michael Learns to Rock (2004)	Eternity (2008)

Singles from Michael Learns to Rock (DK)
- 1. "Frostbite" Released: 2003; 2. "Final Destination" Released: 2004; 3. "Salvation" Released: 2004

Singles from Michael Learns to Rock (Asia)
- 1. "Take Me to Your Heart" Released: January 12, 2004; 2. "This Is Who I Am" Released: March 2004; 3. "If You Leave My World" Released: August 5, 2004; 4. "Take Me To Your Heart (Trance Remix)" Released: January 29, 2005

Alternative album cover
- Asian edition

Michael Learns to Rock is the sixth studio album by Danish soft rock band Michael Learns to Rock. It was released on February 9, 2004, by Medley Records (EMI). The album was re-titled Take Me to Your Heart in Asia.

In Denmark, "Frostbite" was released as the lead single in 2003, followed by "Final Destination" and "Salvation". Michael Learns to Rock performed "Frostbite" and "Final Destination" at Dansk Melodi Grand Prix 2004 on February 7, 2004. The album's lead single in Asia, "Take Me to Your Heart", was released in 2004 and is an adaptation of the 1993 Chinese hit "Goodbye Kiss" by Jacky Cheung. The name of the original song is "吻别" ("Wen Bie").

== Track listing ==
Michael Learns to Rock track listing
No.	Title	Writer(s)	Producer(s)	Length
1.	"Frostbite"	Jascha Richter, Johan Stentorp	Johan Stentorp	4:20
2.	"Final Destination"	Richter, Nick Jarl	Nick Jarl, David Stenmarck	3:21
3.	"Take Me to Your Heart"	Philip Yin (music), Richter (lyrics)	Johan Bejerholm	3:58
4.	"Don't Have to Lose"	Richter	Chief 1	3:41
5.	"Salvation"	Richter, Chief 1	Chief 1	4:00
6.	"Hit By a Feeling"	Richter, Stentorp	Chief 1, Johan Stentorp	4:19
7.	"If You Leave My World"	Richter	Chief 1	4:15
8.	"This Is Who I Am"	Richter, John Gordon	John Gordon	3:45
9.	"Home to You" (duet with Julie Berthelsen)	Richter, Julie Berthelsen, Mats Berntoft, Moh Denebi	Moh Denebi, Mats Berntoft	3:37
10.	"Laugh & Cry"	Richter, Berntoft, Denebi	Rune Westberg	3:15

Asian edition bonus tracks
No.	Title	Writer(s)	Producer(s)	Length
11.	"One More Minute"	Lars Muhl	Johan Stentorp	3:28
12.	"Without Your Love"	Richter	Rune Westberg	3:56

== Charts ==
Chart performance for Michael Learns to Rock
Chart (2004)	Peak position
Danish Albums Chart	9
Singaporean Albums (RIAS)	7
Swedish Albums Chart	34
Swiss Albums Chart	89
