= Blue Night (Michael Learns to Rock album) =

Studio album by Michael Learns To Rock (MLTR)
- Released: 1 November 2000
- Recorded: Feb – September 2000 in Denmark (Boe Larsens Studios, MLTR Studio, Generator, Pancake Studio, Ground Station, and Soundtrack)
- Genre: Soft rock, pop rock
- Label: Medley, Warner Music
- Producer: Boe Larsen, Mikkel Lentz, Nick Foss (exec.), Michael Ritto (exec.)

Michael Learns To Rock (MLTR) chronology
Strange Foreign Beauty (1999)	Blue Night (2000)	19 Love Ballads (2001)

Singles from Blue Night
- 1. "Angel Eyes" Released: 4 October 2000; 2. "Blue Night" Released: 3 November 2000; 3. "You Took My Heart Away" Released: 24 January 2001; 4. "One Way Street" Released: 15 August 2001; 5. "Stuck in the Heat" Released: 23 September 2005

Blue Night is the fifth studio album by Danish soft rock band Michael Learns to Rock (MLTR). It was released on 1 November 2000 by Medley Records (EMI). The album was produced by Boe Larsen with band member Mikkel Lentz, who makes his debut as a songwriter on the song "Tell It to Your Heart". It is the first Michael Learns to Rock album since the departure of bass guitar player Søren Madsen in April 2000; however, his name is still credited on "More Than a Friend". This album was remastered by ADMS on Warner Music label in 2014 due to Michael Learns to Rock 25th anniversary celebrations.

== Track listing ==
No.	Title	Lyrics	Music	Length
1.	"Angel Eyes"	Ashley Mulford	Jascha Richter, Remee, Mulford	3:52
2.	"Whatever It May Take"	Richter	Richter	5:05
3.	"Watch Your Back"	Mulford	Richter	3:48
4.	"You Took My Heart Away"	Richter	Richter	4:30
5.	"Blue Night"	Richter	Richter, Soulpoets	3:40
6.	"One Way Street"	Richter	Richter	4:15
7.	"Stuck in the Heat"	Richter	Richter	4:00
8.	"Tell It to Your Heart"	Mikkel Lentz	Mikkel Lentz	4:38
9.	"More Than a Friend"	Søren Madsen, Mulford	Madsen	3:43
10.	"Digging Your Love"	Richter	Richter	3:46
11.	"Eternal Flame"	Mulford	Richter	4:40
12.	"Fools Direction"	Richter	Richter	4:05

2014 remastered edition bonus tracks
No.	Title	Length
13.	"You Took My Heart Away" (demo) (1999)	4:27
14.	"Tell It to Your Heart" (early version)	5:04
15.	"She'll Be Mine" (1998) (released on It Never Rains on Bali)	4:52
16.	"Upon a Christmas Night" (single) (2004)	3:54

== Charts ==
Chart (2000–01)	Peak position
Danish Albums Chart	1
Philippines Albums Chart	1
Billboard Hot 100	1
Swedish Albums Chart	20
Swiss Albums Chart	25
