= Michael Learns to Rock (1991 album) =

Studio album by Michael Learns to Rock
- Released: 4 September 1991
- Genre: Pop rock, soft rock
- Length: 43:16
- Label: Medley
- Producer: Steve Barri, Poul Bruun, Jens Hofman, Randy Nicklaus, Tony Peluso, Oli Poulsen, Richard Scher

Michael Learns to Rock chronology
Michael Learns to Rock (1991)	Colours (1993)

Singles from Michael Learns to Rock
- 1. "My Blue Angel" Released: 1991; 2. "I Still Carry On" Released: 1991; 3. "The Actor" Released: November 11, 1991; 4. "Let's Build a Room" Released: 1992

Michael Learns to Rock is the debut album of the Danish band Michael Learns to Rock. The album was released in September 1991 through Medley Records in Denmark. It sold 180,000 copies in Scandinavia, and 250,000 copies in the rest of the world. The album includes their signature song "The Actor", which charted at number one in Denmark, Norway, Sweden, Indonesia, Malaysia, Singapore, and the Philippines.

== Track listing ==
No.	Title	Writer(s)	Producer(s)	Length
1.	"My Blue Angel"	Jascha Richter, Michael Price, Richard Scher	Steve Barri, Tony Peluso, Scher (co.)	3:55
2.	"Looking at Love"	Richter, Price, Scher	Barri, Peluso	4:30
3.	"A Kiss in the Rain"	Richter, Price, Scher	Barri, Peluso, Scher (co.)	4:45
4.	"The Actor"	Richter	Jens Hofman, Oli Poulsen	4:34
5.	"Messages"	Richter	Hofman, Poulsen	4:32
6.	"I Still Carry On"	Richter	Hofman, Poulsen	4:36
7.	"Crazy Dream"	Richter, Price, Terry Lupton	Barri, Peluso	3:59
8.	"African Queen"	Richter, Maribeth Derry	Hofman, Poulsen, Peluso	4:10
9.	"Come on and Dance"	Richter, Price	Hofman, Poulsen, Peluso	4:44
10.	"Let's Build a Room"	Richter	Hofman, Poulsen, Peluso	3:35
11.	"Gone After Midnight" (CD bonus track)	Richter, Derry	Hofman, Poulsen	4:10

2014 remastered edition bonus tracks
No.	Title	Length
12.	"The Actor" (remix '99)	4:11
13.	"The Actor" (early piano version)	4:22
14.	"I'll Kill for You" (Outtake 1990)	4:03
15.	"The Actor" (Danish version 17/07/1990)	4:36

== Charts ==
Chart (1992)	Peak position
Norwegian Album Chart	5
Danish Album Chart	1
