= Take Me to Your Heart (Michael Learns to Rock song) =

Single by Michael Learns to Rock

from the album Michael Learns to Rock
- Released: January 12, 2004
- Recorded: February–September 2003
- Genre: Pop rock; soft rock
- Length: 3:58
- Label: EMI
- Composer: Philip Yin
- Lyricist: Jascha Richter
- Producer: Johan Bejerholm

Michael Learns to Rock singles chronology
| "You Took My Heart Away" (2001) | "Take Me to Your Heart" (2004) | "This Is Who I Am" (2004) |

"Take Me to Your Heart" is a song by Danish soft rock band Michael Learns to Rock, released as the first single from their 2004 self-titled album. The song is an adaptation of the 1993 Mandopop hit "Goodbye Kiss" ("吻别", "Wen Bie") by Hong Kong singer Jacky Cheung, which is the title track of the album The Goodbye Kiss.

== Track listing ==
| No. | Title | Length |
|---|---|---|
| 1. | "Take Me to Your Heart" (duet with Anson Hu) | 4:00 |
| 2. | "Take Me to Your Heart" (duet with Shin Hye Sung) | 3:58 |
| 3. | "Take Me to Your Heart" (duet with Shaan) | 4:00 |
| 4. | "Take Me to Your Heart" (live) | 3:39 |
| 5. | "Take Me to Your Heart" | 3:59 |
| 6. | "Take Me to Your Heart" (trance remix) | 4:52 |
| 7. | "Take Me to Your Heart" (karaoke) | 3:58 |
| 8. | "Take Me to Your Heart" (stills karaoke) | 3:57 |

== Charts ==
| Chart (2004) | Peak |
|---|---|
| Taiwan Top 10 | 5 |
| China Top 20 | 14 |
