= That's Why (You Go Away) =

Single by Michael Learns to Rock

from the album Played on Pepper
- B-side: "Time For Changes"
- Released: 28 August 1995
- Recorded: 1995
- Genre: Soft rock
- Length: 3:59
- Label: EMI
- Songwriter: Jascha Richter
- Producer: Michael Learns to Rock

Michael Learns to Rock singles chronology
"Someday" (1995)	"That's Why (You Go Away)" (1995)	"How Many Hours" (1996)

Music video
- Michael Learns To Rock - That's Why You Go Away (with Lyrics Closed Caption) on YouTube

"That's Why (You Go Away)" is a power ballad by the Danish soft rock band Michael Learns to Rock. It was released on August 28, 1995 as the second single from their third studio album Played on Pepper. The song became one of the band's biggest international hits.

== Background ==
"That's Why (You Go Away)" was released after the success of the album's first single, "Someday". The string arrangement of the song was released in the 2014 remastered edition of the album.

== Music video ==
The music video for the song was released later in 1995. It was later released on Michael Learns to Rock's official YouTube account.

== Track listing ==
No.	Title	Length
1.	"That's Why (You Go Away)"	3:59
2.	"Take Off Our Clothes" (extended version)	6:57
3.	"Time for Changes"	3:54

== Chart performance ==
Chart (1995)	Peak position
Denmark (Tracklisten)	1
France (SNEP)	32
Germany (GfK)	81
Switzerland (Schweizer Hitparade)	22

== See also ==
- Jascha Richter
