= Paint My Love (song) =

1997 single by Michael Learns to Rock

Single by Michael Learns to Rock

from the album Paint My Love – Greatest Hits and Nothing to Lose
- B-side: "You'll Never Know"
- Released: 16 October 1996
- Length: 3:48
- Label: Medley
- Songwriter: Jascha Richter
- Producer: Michael Learns to Rock

Michael Learns to Rock singles chronology
"How Many Hours" (1996)	"Paint My Love" (1996)	"Breaking My Heart" (1997)

Audio sample
- A sample from Michael Learns to Rock's "Paint My Love": file; help

Music video
- Paint My Love on YouTube

"Paint My Love" is a song by Danish soft rock band Michael Learns to Rock. The ballad was released as the first single from their first greatest hits album of the same name and fourth album, Nothing to Lose, in Asia in 1996 and in Europe the following year. The song is an indirect English adaptation of the 1996 Dansk Melodi Grand Prix winner "Kun med dig", which was composed by lead singer Jascha Richter and performed by Dorte Andersen and Martin Loft. In additional to reaching number 27 in Switzerland, "Paint My Love" topped the charts of several Asian countries.

== Track listing ==
European CD single

No.	Title	Length
1.	"Paint My Love"	3:48
2.	"You'll Never Know"	3:33
3.	"Paint My Love" (acoustic version)	3:48

== Charts ==
Chart (1997)	Peak position
Switzerland (Schweizer Hitparade)	27
