= Played on Pepper =

Studio album by Michael Learns to Rock
- Released: 28 August 1995
- Recorded: 1994 in M.L.T.R. Studio, Aarhus; Puk Studio, Randers; Grape House, Copenhagen
- Genre: Soft rock, pop rock, alternative rock
- Label: MLTR Music, Medley, Warner Music
- Producer: Michael Learns to Rock, Oli Poulsen, Jens Hofman (exec.), Poul Bruun (exec.)

Michael Learns to Rock chronology
| Colours (1993) | Played on Pepper (1995) | Paint My Love (1996) |

Singles from Played on Pepper
- 1. "Someday" Released: August 14, 1995; 2. "That's Why (You Go Away)" Released: August 28, 1995; 3. "How Many Hours" Released: May 5, 1996; 4. "Love Will Never Lie" Released: June 1, 1996

Played on Pepper is the third studio album by the Danish soft rock band Michael Learns to Rock. It was released on 28 August 1995 by Medley Records in Europe. The first single from the album was "Someday" (1995), followed by "That's Why (You Go Away)" (1995), "How Many Hours" (1996), "Love Will Never Lie" (1996).

As of May 1996, the album had sold 1 million copies worldwide, with 120,000 of them being sold in Denmark. The album has sold 900,000 copies in Asia and 150,000 copies in Europe.

== Track listing ==
All music is composed by Jascha Richter.

| No. | Title | Lyrics | Producer(s) | Length |
|---|---|---|---|---|
| 1. | "Breaking the Rules" | Jascha Richter | Michael Learns to Rock | 4:22 |
| 2. | "Someday" | Richter | Michael Learns to Rock | 3:52 |
| 3. | "That's Why (You Go Away)" | Richter | Michael Learns to Rock | 4:10 |
| 4. | "Love Will Never Lie" | Richter, Ashley Mulford | Michael Learns to Rock | 3:34 |
| 5. | "Judgement Day" | Richter | Michael Learns to Rock | 3:44 |
| 6. | "Hot to Handle" | Richter, Mulford | Michael Learns to Rock | 3:24 |
| 7. | "How Many Hours" | Richter | Michael Learns to Rock | 4:44 |
| 8. | "You'll Never Know" | Richter, Mulford | Oli Poulsen | 3:33 |
| 9. | "Take Off Your Clothes" | Richter | Michael Learns to Rock | 6:32 |
| 10. | "Naked Like the Moon" | Richter | Michael Learns to Rock | 3:28 |

Japanese bonus track
| No. | Title | Lyrics | Length |
|---|---|---|---|
| 11. | "Time for Changes" | Richter, Mulford | 3:54 |

2014 remastered edition bonus tracks
| No. | Title | Length |
|---|---|---|
| 11. | "That's Why (You Go Away)" (string arrangement) (unreleased) | 4:24 |
| 12. | "Time for Changes" (Bonus track) | 3:55 |
| 13. | "The Loss of a Friend" (It Never Rains on Bali version) | 5:02 |
| 14. | "That's Why (You Go Away)" (Demo) | 4:41 |
| 15. | "How Many Hours" (Demo) | 5:01 |
| 16. | "Someday" (Demo) | 4:16 |
