= 25 Minutes =

1994 single by Michael Learns to Rock

Single by Michael Learns to Rock

from the album Colours
- B-side: "I'm Gonna Come Back"
- Released: 1 February 1994
- Length: 4:20
- Label: EMI
- Songwriters: Jascha Richter, Søren Madsen
- Producers: Jens Hofman, Michael Learns to Rock

Michael Learns to Rock singles chronology
"Wild Women" (1993)	"25 Minutes" (1994)	"Something Right" (1994)

Music video
- "25 Minutes" on YouTube

"25 Minutes" is a song by Danish soft rock band Michael Learns to Rock. It was released by EMI Records as the third single and as well as the sixth track from their second studio album, Colours (1993). The song was written by vocalist Jascha Richter and bassist Søren Madsen.

== Track listings ==
Scandinavia CD single
No.	Title	Length
1.	"25 Minutes"	4:20
2.	"I'm Gonna Come Back"	4:11

Netherlands CD single
No.	Title	Length
1.	"25 Minutes" (special single edit)	3:48
2.	"Something Right"	3:35
3.	"Ocean of Love"	4:47
4.	"Time for Changes"	3:54

Philippines 7-inch single A-side
No.	Title	Length
1.	"25 Minutes"	4:20

B-side
No.	Title	Length
1.	"25 Minutes"	4:20

== Charts ==
Chart (1994)	Peak position
Germany (GfK)	59
Iceland (Íslenski Listinn Topp 40)	20
