= Someday (Michael Learns to Rock song) =

1995 single by Michael Learns to Rock

Single by Michael Learns to Rock

from the album Played on Pepper
- Released: 1995
- Length: 3:51
- Label: EMI
- Songwriter: Jascha Richter
- Producer: Michael Learns to Rock

Michael Learns to Rock singles chronology
| "Out of the Blue" (1994) | "Someday" (1995) | "That's Why (You Go Away)" (1995) |

"Someday" is a song by Danish soft rock band Michael Learns to Rock, released as the first single from their third album Played on Pepper, in 1995. It has been performed on a regular basis during the band's Asian tours.

== Music video ==
The video was shot in Bali, Indonesia, which features the band singing on Padang Padang Beach.

== Track listing ==
CD-maxi

| No. | Title | Length |
|---|---|---|
| 1. | "Someday" | 3:51 |
| 2. | "Hot to Handle" | 3:23 |
| 3. | "Naked Like the Moon" | 3:28 |

== Media usage ==
The song is briefly featured in the 2010 South Indian parody film Tamizh Padam, as the protagonist's "family song".
