= The Actor (Michael Learns to Rock song) =

1991 single by Michael Learns to Rock

Single by Michael Learns to Rock

from the album Michael Learns to Rock
- B-side: "African Queen"
- Released: 11 November 1991
- Length: 4:34
- Label: Medley; Impact
- Songwriter: Jascha Richter
- Producers: Jens Hofman; Oli Poulsen

Michael Learns to Rock singles chronology
"I Still Carry On" (1991)	"The Actor" (1991)	"Sleeping Child" (1993)

Music video
- The Actor on YouTube

"The Actor" is a song by Danish soft rock band Michael Learns to Rock, from their 1991 debut album Michael Learns to Rock. It was released as a single on 11 November 1991. "The Actor" peaked at number four in Denmark, reached number one in Norway, and topped Indonesia's airplay chart. The band has played the song regularly during their Asian tours.

== Chart performance ==
"The Actor" had success on several European charts. The song peaked at number one on the Norwegian Singles Chart and entered the top 10 on the Danish and Swedish charts, peaking at numbers four and seven respectively. The song also reached the top 40 on the Swiss Singles Chart, peaking at number 32, and peaked at number 54 on the Eurochart Hot 100.

== Track listings ==
Standard

1. "The Actor" – 4:35
2. "African Queen" – 4:11

Dutch maxi-CD single

1. "The Actor" – 4:35
2. "Gone After Midnight" – 4:12
3. "African Queen" – 4:11

== Charts ==
=== Weekly charts ===
Chart (1992)	Peak position
Denmark (IFPI)	4
Europe (Eurochart Hot 100)	54
Indonesia (Indonesian Airplay Chart)	1
Norway (VG-lista)	1
Sweden (Sverigetopplistan)	7
Switzerland (Schweizer Hitparade)	32

=== Year-end charts ===
Chart (1992)	Position
Sweden (Topplistan)	29
