= Colours (Michael Learns to Rock album) =

Studio album by Michael Learns to Rock
- Released: October 1, 1993
- Recorded: July–September 1993
- Genres: Soft rock; pop rock
- Label: Medley
- Producers: Oli Poulsen; Michael Learns to Rock; Jens Hofman (exec.); Poul Bruun (exec.)

Michael Learns to Rock chronology
Michael Learns to Rock (1991)	Colours (1993)	Played on Pepper (1995)

Singles from Colours
- 1. "Sleeping Child (Michael Learns to Rock song)" Released: September 21, 1993; 2. "Wild Women" Released: 1993; 3. "Out Of The Blue" Released: 1994; 4. "25 Minutes" Released: February 1, 1994; 5. "Something Right" Released: 1994

Colours is the second studio album by the Danish soft rock band Michael Learns to Rock. It was released in October 1993. As of 1995, the album had sold 1.2 million copies worldwide. In Denmark the album sold 40,000 copies.

== Release ==
The song "Sleeping Child" was released in 1993 as the first single from Colours. Jascha Richter composed the song.

Colours sold more than 300,000 copies in Thailand, becoming the second best-selling album of all time there (behind Michael Jackson's Thriller).

== Track listing ==
All music is composed by Jascha Richter, except for "I'm Gonna Come Back" which was jointly composed by Jascha Richter and Ashley Mulford and "25 Minutes" which was jointly composed by Jascha Richter and Søren Madsen.

No.	Title	Lyrics	Length
1.	"Wild Women"	Jascha Richter	3:53
2.	"Something Right"	Ashley Mulford	3:35
3.	"Sleeping Child"	Richter	3:33
4.	"I'm Gonna Come Back"	Richter, Mulford	4:11
5.	"Complicated Heart"	Richter	4:24
6.	"25 Minutes"	Jascha Richter, Søren Madsen	4:20
7.	"You Keep Me Running"	Mulford	3:34
8.	"Out of the Blue"	Richter	3:58
9.	"Ocean of Love"	Richter	4:47
10.	"I Wanna Dance"	Richter	3:48

2014 remastered edition bonus tracks
No.	Title	Length
11.	"Sleeping Child" (special remix)	4:10
12.	"Sleeping Child" (demo)	3:45
13.	"25 Minutes" (demo)	4:22
14.	"Never Ending Sunrise" (Colours outtake)	4:19
15.	"Something Right" (Puk Studio version)	3:30
16.	"Wild Women" (acoustic from Puk Studio 1993)	4:02
17.	"Complicated Heart" (no drums version)	4:24
18.	"Out of the Blue" (demo)	4:34
