= Michael Learns to Rock =

Danish rock band

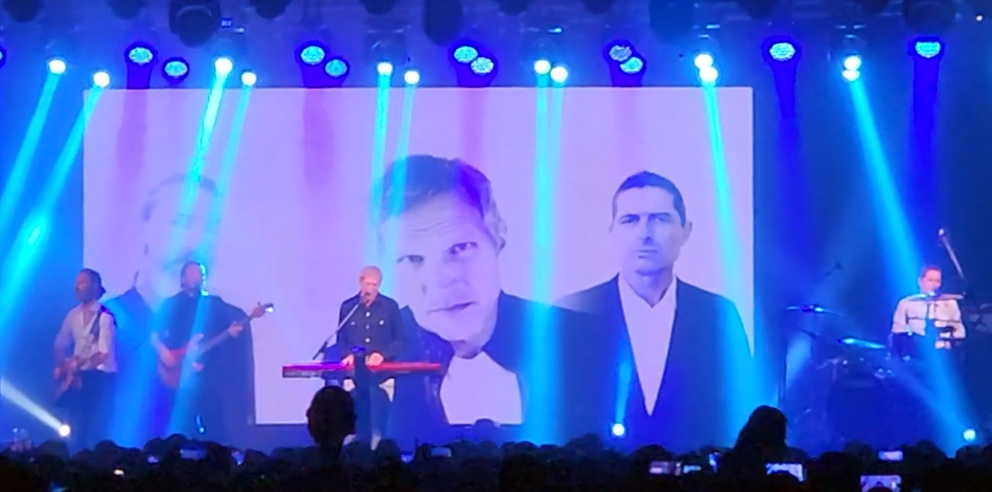
- Michael Learns to Rock performing live in Davao City, Philippines in 2022

Background information
- Also known as: MLTR
- Origin: Aarhus, Denmark
- Genres: Soft rock; pop rock
- Years active: 1988–present
- Labels: EMI Records; Medley Records; MLTR Music (most albums and singles sold under licence by Warner Music, except Scandinavia, co-distributed under licence by Universal Music Group in India; Warner Music Group in South East Asia and Hong Kong; Sony Music in the rest of the world)
- Members: Jascha Richter; Mikkel Lentz; Kåre Wanscher
- Past members: Søren Madsen
- Website: www.mltr.dk

Michael Learns to Rock (MLTR) is a Danish soft rock band formed in 1988. The band currently consists of Jascha Richter, Mikkel Lentz and Kåre Wanscher. Søren Madsen was an original member of the group since its formation but left in 2000. The band has sold over 11 million records over the course of their career, with the majority sold in Scandinavia and Asia. Despite being Danish, the band performs songs in English. The band has attributed its success in Asia to their drug-free, clean-living image, and to singing in English as a second language.

MLTR has earned gold and platinum status for records in many countries and won many awards, including the Gold Preis Award from RSH, Germany and "The Best Performing Act of the Year" at the SEA Grammy Awards in Singapore. In addition, their song "Take Me to Your Heart" was awarded "most downloaded single of the year 2006" with 6 million or more paid downloads. The band has recorded nine studio albums as well as a number of live and greatest hits albums. Their latest studio album, Still, was released on 21 March 2018.

During the peak of their popularity in the mid and late 1990s, MLTR was described by critics as being "as good (if not better) a band as any current big name group out of America or the UK or the Australia." According to the band's record label releases, their sound is "the perfect balance of a Scandinavian glow and the international pop song that has been instrumental in forming the compelling sound of the band", although the lead singer and songwriter, Jascha Richter, disagrees with this, maintaining that the music defies geographical categorization.

== History ==
=== Formation (1988–1992) ===
In 1988, singer Jascha Richter with the intent of forming a band to perform his songs, asked his high school friend and drummer Kåre Wanscher in Aarhus, Denmark to perform with him. Realizing the limitations of playing as a duo, they recruited the guitarist Mikkel Lentz, who was then playing rock music with his group the Rocking Studs. On 15 March 1988, their first night of practice made them realize they needed a fourth musician, so they asked Søren Madsen, another guitarist who was into Led Zeppelin, to join in on bass guitar. Although Madsen was not an obvious choice for a pop band, he was invited on the basis that he had been part of the band Hip Hop that had reached the finals of a Danish competition to nominate a song to the Eurovision Song Contest.

Since Richter already had a number of original songs, eliminating the need to jam, they were able to quickly record a demo tape intending it to be sent to the 'Rock Grand Prix' competition in their hometown Aarhus, they had to hurriedly come up with a name before posting it; Richter wrote as the name of the sender 'Michael Learns to Rock', partly inspired by a line from his school English textbook and partly because they were a pop band taking part in a rock concert. Lentz and Richter have admitted that the band was named after Michael Jackson: "I think Richter was thinking of Michael Jackson, because he was called 'the king of pop' and it was kind of funny, because it was like, what would he sound like if he learned to rock? It was wordplay," Lentz has stated. Richter claimed in an interview: "Yeah, it was like Johnny Hates Jazz and Frankie Goes to Hollywood. Sure, I've regretted calling ourselves this many times since, but we were successful so quickly, we had to stick with it and over time I got used to it."

On 22 May 1988, the quartet played their first public show in Aarhus in 'Rock Grand Prix' at Aarhus's biggest venue, Ridehuset. As one of the two winning teams, MLTR performed that summer at the Aarhus Outdoor Festival on 20 June, however, only 20 people turned up. The disappointment was offset by a daily newspaper, Information, describing the unknown group as "an immensely positive surprise". On 30 July 1988, the group entered and won the city's famed annual talent shows 'We Have The Stage – Do You Have The Music?' at Aarhus Musikhus.

Jens Peter (J.P.) Andersen, a member of the contest jury as well as a promoter of Danmarks Smukkeste Festival (literally, "Denmark’s Most Beautiful Festival") at Skanderborg, was impressed with the band's talent but was somewhat annoyed at their lack of professionalism, so he decided to become the band's manager, at the band's request. Michael Learns to Rock continued playing live throughout Jutland and recording material in order to attract the attention of Danish record labels. One of these efforts included the band contributing four tracks for the double album Secrets, a record organised by the Danish Rock Council to create interest in four talented but 'secret' new bands. They finally signed a record deal with the Danish label Medley in January 1989. However, the band did not release their first album, Michael Learns to Rock, until September 1991, backed by the American record label Impact Records and with much of the album including the first American single, "My Blue Angel", mixed and produced by the American producers Tony Peluso and Steve Barri.

Although not making any headway as intended in America despite airplay for "My Blue Angel", which did peak at #70 on the Cash Box Top 100, a later single (the second in Denmark after "I Still Carry On") from the album, "The Actor", topped the Danish chart and also did well in Norway, Sweden, Indonesia, Malaysia, Singapore and the Philippines. In January 1992, the album topped the Danish charts, followed soon after by success in Asia, selling 25,000 copies and earning gold status in Indonesia alone.

=== International breakthrough (1993–1996) ===
Encouraged by the performance of their first album, Michael Learns to Rock released a second album, Colours, in October 1993 which sold over 1.1 million records. The album included the singles "Sleeping Child", "25 Minutes" and "Out of the Blue". The band toured Asia for the first time. At the Phoebus Concert Hall in Bangkok they played to their largest audience until then of 12,000 people. The performance of this album coupled with the band's live performances resulted in the band receiving 'The Best Performing Act of the Year' award in 1994 at SEA Grammy Awards in Singapore for their performance of "25 Minutes", followed by the 'Gold Preis' from the German radio station RSH (Radio Schleswig-Holstein) in 1995 for radio hits such as "Wild Women'" and "25 Minutes".

In August 1995, Michael Learns to Rock's third album Played on Pepper was released, selling more than 1.2 million units. Tracks in this album included "That's Why (You Go Away)" and "Someday". For the first time, the band recorded and produced the whole album themselves. To promote the album, the group performed 25 shows in ten countries. The release of this album also increased the band's presence in hitherto untapped markets like Brazil, South Africa, the UAE and eleven countries in the Far East, including Japan.

To capitalize on the success of Played on Pepper and to curb piracy, Michael Learns to Rock released the greatest hits album Paint My Love in October 1996, primarily in Asia; the album sold 3.4 million copies. The song, "Paint My Love", is an English version of "Kun med dig" by Danish singers Dorthe Andersen and Martin Loft, which was composed by Jascha Richter. The band was also chosen as the headliner for the 'Celebrate Hong Kong' concert on 6 July 1997, marking the transfer of Hong Kong from the United Kingdom to China. The album also topped the charts in South Africa with sales of more than 350,000 copies in South Africa alone.

=== Mainstream success in Asia (1997–1999) ===
They released their fourth studio album, Nothing to Lose, was released in September 1997, and also sold more than 1.1 million copies. In an incident that showcased Michael Learns to Rock's popularity in Asia, 20,000 fake tickets were sold (more than twice the number of real ones) for a concert in Hanoi, Vietnam, in December 1997 and while the concert was on, those outside with fake tickets tried to break into the concert hall through the windows causing riot police to be deployed. The band travelled to South Africa in January 1998, playing sell-out concerts in Johannesburg and Pretoria, consequently taking Nothing to Lose to the top of the charts in South Africa.

Soon after, the band's members took a break to spend time with their families and to develop projects on their own or in collaboration with other performers. They also decided to re-brand the band under the simpler name of MLTR. During the break, Richter wrote some new songs for the band, one of which is "Strange Foreign Beauty" that was later added to the 1999 greatest hits album Greatest Hits – Strange Foreign Beauty. In a process undertaken by MLTR for the first time, the song was made by compiling the best details from recordings of ideas made individually by the four members. This album included their previous hits, either remixed or refined in some way by notable international producers such as Chris Lord-Alge (for "Someday", "Something You Should Know" etc.), Cutfather & Joe (for "Sleeping Child") and the Swedish producer Per Magnusson (for the MLTR top hit "The Actor'"). This greatest hits album went to the top of the Danish sales charts (the second MLTR album after their first album to do so), as well in Sweden and Portugal, and logged sales of nearly a million copies.

=== Continuing as a trio (2000–2006) ===
In 2000, Søren Madsen decided to leave the group to embark on a solo career. The remaining three members set themselves the challenge of pursuing a sound different from that of their previous albums and thus produced the album Blue Night, which almost went platinum in Denmark and sold well in Asia, with sales over one million. The following year a biography of MLTR, Something You Should Know written by Poul Martin-Bonde, was published along with a few previously unreleased recordings. The English translation of the book was called It Never Rains on Bali, a reference to an incident that took place during the band's 1995 Bali concert, where a no-rain forecast proved wrong and the unexpected rain stopped the concert.

After the release of Blue Night, the band took a prolonged break, with Richter working on his solo album Planet Blue. The band later admitted that they even considered disbanding during this time. They ultimately decided against it, following the success of their greatest hits album releases, including 19 Love Songs / Love Ballads in 2002, which went to number 2 in Denmark.

In 2004, the band regrouped again, departing from the name MLTR, and using the original name for their sixth album called Michael Learns to Rock, released in Asia as Take Me to Your Heart. The album focused on the Asian market. The single "Take Me to Your Heart" was a remake of Jacky Cheung's "Goodbye Kiss" ("吻别"), and was popular in China, Hong Kong, Vietnam, Thailand and Taiwan. By the end of 2006 alone, the single created a record when it sold over 6 million paid downloads and was awarded the "Most Downloaded Single of the Year 2006". MLTR sang an English and Chinese duet of "Take Me to Your Heart" with the Chinese singer Hu Yanbin at a 2005 New Year's Party in Guangzhou, China. The band also sang the song with the South Korean star Shin Hye-sung, lead vocalist of the famous boy band Shinhwa. This album has been one of the major successes of MLTR in Asia, especially China.

=== Independent label; MLTR Music (2007–2013) ===
In 2007, MLTR performed at the Formula1 in Shanghai and The 6th Golden Eagle Award Ceremony. Later in the year, MLTR released The Best of Michael Learns to Rock Live and in July toured Hong-Kong, Taiwan, Thailand and Malaysia. Elsewhere, this album was released as The Live Musical Adventures of Michael Learns to Rock / I Walk This Road Alone, and featured live recordings from their Take Me to Your Heart Asian Tour, mainly from the September 2005 concerts in India.

In November 2008, MLTR released their seventh studio album titled Eternity under their own independent label, MLTR Music, in association with the Danish label At:tack. This album has the distinction of being the first MLTR album to be produced solely by Mikkel Lentz. The band mention on their website that the name is an indication of the fact that "the band plan to make music for as long as they still find joy in the process". Although the sales were slow (admittedly, according to the band), the second single from the album, "Sweetest Surprise" reached No. 1 in Thailand within a few weeks of release. The following year, another track, "It's Gonna Make Sense", gained popularity in Asia after it was played as the farewell song on the Philippine reality TV show Pinoy Big Brother. The promotion of the album took MLTR on the Eternity South East Asia Tour, the response to which, the band declare, has led them to consider playing more concerts abroad, especially in Southeast Asia.

Michael Learns to Rock completed touring their home-country Denmark, having played unplugged concerts in February and March 2010 with fair success. In June 2010, the band undertook a three-city promotional tour of India playing shows at Mumbai, Delhi and Bangalore to promote the latest album "Eternity". More Unplugged shows followed in Denmark in late 2010. The band also did a short promotional tour of China and Macau from 27 September to 1 October 2010 for their upcoming China concerts in December 2010 and to give a preview of their Chinese Tour Compilation CD. This was followed up with their first ever international Unplugged concerts at Beijing, Shanghai and Guangzhou in December 2010. The track "Fairy Tale", an English cover version of a song originally performed by singer Li Jian, and later popularized by Hong Kong pop diva Faye Wong, was released in conjunction with the CD release. Following this, the band was scheduled to play another unplugged tour in Denmark in spring 2011.

In a blog, dated 13 April 2010 on the band's website, the band announced that they have started working on their next album. Over the latter part of 2010 and throughout 2011, Michael Learns to Rock began giving feelers about their next studio album on their official Facebook page. The album which was till then not named, was set to be released on 11 August 2011 in Europe and Denmark, with releases following in other territories around the same time, but was subsequently postponed to an unspecified later date. In a teaser Facebook update, the band revealed the name of one of the tracks to be "Ice Breaker". Elsewhere, in a note on his Facebook Page, Jascha Richter had revealed the name of another song, "Hanging On", from the forthcoming album.

On 19 November 2011, the band unveiled the song "Any Way You Want It" from the forthcoming album at a live concert in Kathmandu produced and organized by ODC Network (P)LTD. The band also shot footage in and around Kathmandu and during the performance of the song, to include it on the song's music video. The video of the song was then released formally on 11 June 2012 by the band on YouTube first, and soon after, it started airing on TV in India and Nepal.

The studio album Scandinavia was released on 11 June 2012 in India digitally by Virgin Records on Nokia Music. Subsequently, release of the physical CD of album took place in many Asian countries, namely India (30 June 2012), Malaysia (2 July), Singapore (4 July), Thailand (12 July), Korea (12 July), Taiwan (13 July), Hong Kong (17 July), Philippines (19 July), Indonesia (15 August), and then in China. The album was released in Denmark by Sony Music Denmark on 3 September 2012. The album was also made available in Asia on iTunes. As in the case of the previous album Eternity, the album Scandinavia was also solely produced by Mikkel Lentz.

The first single from Scandinavia, "Renovate My Life", was released on iTunes on 9 June 2012, going on air in Denmark from 11 June. The album release began on 11 June 2012, with the release of a music video for "Any Way You Want It" on YouTube, as well as the digital release of the album in India. The music video features different places of Kathmandu valley and the capital city of Nepal, where the band performed a concert in November 2011. The physical CD of Scandinavia was first released on 30 June 2012 in India by Virgin Records, by Warner Music during July in Southeast Asia, and by Sony Music on 3 September 2012 in Denmark.

=== 25th anniversary, side projects, new album (2014–2020) ===
In 2014, the group released 25: The Complete Singles in commemoration of the band's 25th anniversary, released on 25 October 2014, which included two new studio recordings. The first single, "Silent Times" was released on 16 September 2014, followed by "Call on Love", released on 18 December 2014. The band also recorded "Eternal Love", the theme song of the Korean drama series, Healer. The song was written by Lee Sang Joon, Denzil "DR" Remedios, and Ryan Jhun Sewon. In 2015, the group released the single "I'll Wait for You" on 6 November 2015. In 2016, they released the single "We Shared the Night" on 5 February 2016, their Valentine's Day gift to their fans and it includes to their 2016 EP With Love.

The song "It's Gonna Make Sense" from the album Eternity was featured in the Indian film Welcome M1LL10NS, directed by Milroy Goes, in which Mikkel Lentz contributed the background score to the film. The film was filmed in the states of Goa and Punjab. It was also contested at the 91st Academy Awards and qualified at Oscars 2019 in the General Category.

The band had been working on their new record over the course of 2017 and into early 2018. In late January 2018, the band organized a competition over their social media platforms for the title of their upcoming album. Over the course of the week, they released the titles of the songs slated to be released through their new record. On 2 February 2018, the band released a new single titled "Everything You Need".

After the contest, the band announced its winner, as well as the title of their ninth studio album, Still. Released on 21 March 2018 through all digital music platforms successfully and on limited number of special physical copies, the album features songs that sound like "Michael Learns to Rock but it sounds like today," according to Wanscher.

== Touring ==
As of September 2010, Michael Learns to Rock have played over 450 shows, including both large and small open-air and closed-hall stage concerts, TV appearances, unplugged and sing-back gigs, over a period of 22 years. In total, MLTR have played in at least 21 countries and territories which include Denmark, Nepal, Indonesia, China, Thailand, Malaysia, the Philippines, Hong Kong, India, Japan, Singapore, Taiwan, South Africa, Switzerland, Bangladesh, UAE, Faroe Islands, Vietnam, Cambodia, Norway, South Korea, Sri Lanka, Papua New Guinea and Sweden. They have also traveled to Hollywood for recording part of their debut album, to Spain, Finland and Germany to attend interviews, and to the United Kingdom to shoot a video. In Asia, MLTR are one of the few artists to have played more than once in a country and to have still sustained an audience turn-out comparable to that of their earlier appearances.

Michael Learns to Rock were also the first international act to have performed in Cambodia when they played a show (that was also televised live) in front of 700 fans in CTN's Studio One in Phnom Penh in October 2005. The alternative version of their live album called The Live Musical Adventures of Michael Learns to Rock-I Walk This Road Alone features 14 live audio recordings mostly from their September 2005 show at Shillong, India, and a few video recordings from other live shows in Asia.

In various interviews, the band members have admitted that touring and the response from fans to their concerts, among other reasons, keep them together, in spite of the stresses associated with traveling. In a 2010 interview Mikkel Lentz said, "The reason we stay together is because it makes sense. Our fans come to our shows and we still enjoy playing and travelling, so why should we stop? There is also the pleasure of making music, even though sometimes things like television shows or interviews can become a little boring." Kåre Wanscher has also said in an interview that the highest points of their career have been when they were out touring Asia over the last few years.

MLTR toured China in December 2010, playing unplugged concerts. The 2011 spring leg of the Danish tour started on 17 February 2011 and ended on 12 March 2011 with MLTR playing gigs in most of the Danish cities and towns, many of which were sold out. MLTR then completed their first full-production concert tour after their extended unplugged stint by playing in Malaysia on 22 April 2011 in Penang, 24 April in Kuala Lumpur and 30 April in Kuantan.

The summer tour commenced on 11 August 2011 with the band playing in Skanderborg, on 12 August 2011 in Aarhus and on 13 August at Aabenraa.

The band played on 19 November 2011 for the first time ever in Kathmandu, Nepal at the Tudikhel Ground, as the headliners of Nepal Rocks. The band were only the second internationally acclaimed band to play in Nepal, after the Canadian artist Bryan Adams did so earlier in the year. They also performed in Dhaka, Bangladesh on 22 June 2012 and in Ulaanbaatar, Mongolia on 7 and 8 December 2012.

The band was the first to stream their 25th anniversary concert live to a global audience, using the Subcell smartphone app. The concert was broadcast live in sound and video from the Skanderborg Smukfest festival in Denmark on 11 August 2013. In Asia, their MLTR 25 Tour was staged in the Philippines on 19 September 2015.

On 13 December 2015, MLTR performed live for the first time in North East India's prehistoric ancient city of Guwahati (earlier known as Pragjyotishpur) in Assam in front of a 75,000-strong audience at the Sarusajai Stadium, in the company of popular Assamese-Indian singer-composer Jim Ankan Deka. The musical night was inaugurated with multilingual performances by Jim Ankan Deka and his band VooDoo Child, wherein they sang their own compositions of Assamese and English songs. The attendance in the show was unprecedented in the city of Guwahati so far.

On 31 August 2017, MLTR's first stop in their Eternal Asia Tour was staged at the Kia Theatre in Manila to a sold-out crowd. In 2019, MLTR performed in the United States for the first time, playing at the Melrose Ballroom in New York City.

In October 2022, the band played in the cities of Manila, Cebu, and Davao as part of their Back on the Road Tour 2022 in the Philippines.

On 18 July 2024, it was announced that MLTR would be holding the Asia Tour 2024 to perform in multiple countries such as Indonesia, the Philippines, Thailand, Malaysia, Singapore and Vietnam throughout November 2024.

In August 2025, MLTR played their first North American tour, which took them to Los Angeles, San Jose, Seattle, Chicago, and New York City in the US, as well as Toronto in Canada. In January 2026, they performed in the United Kingdom for the first time, playing the Indigo at the O2 in London.

== Musical style and influences ==
Michael Learns to Rock infuses soft rock and ballads and follows a basic verse-chorus song-form (which is typical of most pop songs) with lyrics comprising straight forward and short-length phrasing incorporating very basic sentence constructions. The verses consist of either one or two couplets and the chorus often contrasts the verse melodically, rhythmically, and harmonically, assuming a higher level of dynamics and activity. The essence of this style followed invariably by MLTR is evident from Jascha Richter's dead-pan response to a query in an interview as to what constituted the elements of a good song: "You got to have a chorus and a verse". Many songs incorporate a bridge section following the second chorus section (most notably "25 Minutes", "That's Why (You Go Away)", "Someday", "Paint My Love", "Blue Night" etc.). Many songs also contain instrumental solos, more commonly, guitar (e.g. "Someday", "That's Why (You Go Away)", "How Many Hours", "The Actor", "Something You Should Know", "Breaking My Heart", "Watch Your Back" etc.) and sometimes the keyboard (e.g. "Messages"), following the second chorus or following the bridge, in case the latter is present. Vocal harmonies also constitute a common feature of their songs.

Lentz admits that they never really jam to come out with or develop upon a song and most of MLTR's songs are written and composed by Richter on the piano. According to Richter, however, after he has written the song, Lentz takes the ideas further and makes it into a final production. Lentz insists that MLTR do not fit to any genre of music except for having a classic pop-sound. Further, he believes the secret behind MLTR's sustained music career is the non-conformance to any musical trends; "We never tried to follow trends. I think that's the reason we are still around. There's been trip hop, grunge, pop. We never fitted into these trends. What seems to be tough then is now our strength. They're just songs. The songs don't belong to a musical wave."

Michael Learns to Rock have cited their influences to be Supertramp, Elton John, the Beatles, the Rolling Stones, Stevie Wonder, Billy Joel, ABBA, Bee Gees and "all the bands that write good lyrics" (as Mikkel Lentz puts it tongue-in-cheek). Lentz, however, denies the influence of Michael Jackson in their music.

However, Richter revealed on his Facebook page in response to a fan's query that Michael Jackson's music did influence their music, especially the latter's Bad album which was released in the year preceding MLTR's formation. Also, Richter has cited the new wave bands Talk Talk, a-ha and Eurythmics to be his influences. A-ha's international success, in spite of originating from the small Scandinavian country of Norway, instilled the self-belief in the MLTR members that even they, hailing from a similarly small Scandinavian country (Denmark), could carve out a career for themselves in international music.

== Band members ==
Current line-up

- Jascha Richter - lead vocals, keyboards, piano, rhythm guitar (1988–present)
- Mikkel Lentz - lead guitar, backing vocals, keyboards (1988–present)
- Kåre Wanscher - drums, percussion, backing vocals (1988–present)

Former member

- Søren Madsen - bass, rhythm guitar, backing vocals, percussion (1988–2000)

Touring member

- Troels Skjærbæk - bass

== Discography ==
- Michael Learns to Rock (1991)
- Colours (1993)
- Played on Pepper (1995)
- Nothing to Lose (1997)
- Blue Night (2000)
- Michael Learns to Rock (2004)
- Eternity (2008)
- Scandinavia (2012)
- STILL (2018)
