= Jascha Richter =

Danish-American musician (born 1963)

- Born: 24 June 1963 (age 63); Concord, New Hampshire, U.S.
- Origin: Aarhus, Denmark
- Genres: Soft rock; pop rock
- Occupations: Singer; songwriter; musician
- Instruments: Vocals; keyboards; guitar; flute; cello
- Member of: Michael Learns to Rock

Jascha Richter (born 24 June 1963) is a Danish-American singer, songwriter, and musician best known as the lead vocalist and keyboardist of the soft rock band Michael Learns to Rock, where he composes and sings most of their songs. Some of his best known songs include "25 Minutes", "The Actor", "Sleeping Child", "That's Why (You Go Away)", "Take Me to Your Heart", "Complicated Heart", "Someday", "Wild Women", "Out of the Blue", "You Took My Heart Away" and "Paint My Love".

== Early life ==
Jascha Richter was born on 24 June 1963 in Concord, New Hampshire, before his family decided to move back to Denmark, where they settled in Aarhus. He holds both Danish and American citizenship. As a child, Richter started playing the flute and cello and then the piano. He was raised with classical music; however, in his early teenage years he started to play and compose pop music. Growing up, he listened to Elton John, Supertramp and Bee Gees among others. He is of German and Danish ancestry.

== Career ==
Richter is known as the main brain behind the Danish soft rock band Michael Learns to Rock, who have enjoyed success since the early 1990s, particularly in Southeast Asia and China. They scored number one chart hits in Norway and Denmark with "The Actor" and "That's Why (You Go Away)", respectively.

Richter has also released two solo albums; Planet Blue in 2002 and Where I Belong in 2006. An extended play titled Dannevang was released in 2021.

== Discography ==
=== Solo albums ===
- Planet Blue (2002)
- Where I Belong (2006)

=== Extended plays ===
- Dannevang (2021)

=== Compilation albums ===
- Grænseløs Greatest (1999)
