= Soft rock =

Music genre derived from popular and rock music

- Other names: Light rock; mellow rock
- Stylistic origins: Pop rock; sunshine pop; Brill Building
- Cultural origins: Mid- to late 1960s, United Kingdom and Southern California
- Derivative forms: Adult contemporary music; hypnagogic pop

Other topics
- Folk rock; sunshine pop; yacht rock; sophisti-pop; blue-eyed soul

Soft rock (also known as light rock, mellow rock or adult-oriented rock) is a form of rock music that originated in the late 1960s in the United States and the United Kingdom which smoothed over the edges of singer-songwriter and pop rock, relying on simple, melodic songs with big, lush productions. Soft rock was prevalent on the radio throughout the 1970s and eventually metamorphosed into a form of the synthesized music of adult contemporary in the 1980s.

== History ==
=== Mid-to-late 1960s ===
Softer sounds in rock music could be heard in mid-1960s songs, such as "A Summer Song" by Chad & Jeremy (1964), "Here, There and Everywhere" by the Beatles, "I Love My Dog" by Cat Stevens (both from 1966), and "Love Is All Around" by the Troggs (1967).

By 1968, hard rock had been established as a mainstream genre. From the end of the 1960s, it became common to divide mainstream rock music into soft and hard rock, with both emerging as major radio formats in the US. The Bee Gees were considered soft rock in the late 1960s.

=== Early 1970s ===
Major artists of that time included America, Bread, Carly Simon, Carole King, Cat Stevens and James Taylor.

The Hot 100 and Easy Listening charts became similar again toward the end of the 1960s and into the early and mid- 1970s when the texture of much of the music played on top 40 radio once more began to soften. The adult contemporary format began evolving into the sound that later defined it, with rock-oriented acts as Chicago, the Eagles and Elton John becoming associated with the format. The Carpenters' hit version of "(They Long to Be) Close to You" was released in the summer of 1970, followed by Bread's "Make It with You", both early examples of a softer sound that was coming to dominate the charts.

The soft rock album Tapestry by Carole King, released in February 1971, became one of the best-selling albums of all time. The lead double-sided single from the album, "It's Too Late"/"I Feel the Earth Move", spent five weeks at number one on the Billboard Hot 100 beginning in mid-June 1971.

Albert Hammond scored a major hit single with "It Never Rains in Southern California" in 1972, which went top 10 in at least six countries including Canada and the U.S. at numbers 2 and 5, respectively.

In the spring of 1972, Neil Young scored his only number-one single with "Heart of Gold", from the album Harvest. Topping the charts in both the U.S. and Canada, this soft rock ballad featured backing vocals from Linda Ronstadt and James Taylor, heard near the end of the song.

Los Angeles station KNX-FM, under program director Steve Marshall, introduced a "mellow rock" format in 1973.

Also in 1973, Paul McCartney and Wings had a U.S. number one with "My Love", which also reached No. 1 on the Adult Contemporary charts of both the U.S. and Canada.

=== Mid- to late 1970s ===
Soft rock reached its commercial peak in the mid-to-late 1970s with acts such as Toto, England Dan & John Ford Coley, Air Supply, Seals and Crofts, America and the reformed Fleetwood Mac, whose Rumours (1977) was the best-selling album of the decade.

Denver station KIMN-FM introduced a "mellow rock" album format in 1975. Program director Scott Kenyon told Billboard magazine, "Michael Murphey's 'Wildfire' is a perfect example; it feels like Colorado, you can tell it came from this part of the country. There's a sound of the Rockies... the best description is mellow rock. Take that kind of music and make it into a Colorado sounding station".

By 1977, some radio stations, notably New York's WTFM and NBC-owned WYNY, had switched to an all-soft rock format. Chicago's WBBM-FM adopted a soft rock/album rock hybrid format in 1977 and was known as "Soft Rock 96" presenting the "Mellow sound of Chicago". Five years later, they would flip to a "Hot Hits" top 40 format.

By the 1980s, tastes had changed and radio formats reflected this change, including musical artists such as Journey.

A prominent counterpart of soft rock in the late 1970s and early 1980s came to be known as yacht rock; its name coined in 2005 by the makers of the online video series Yacht Rock. Originating from California's session musicians, yacht rock only partially overlapped with soft rock; it could include soft to mid-level (but rarely ever purely hard) rock. Much of the "West Coast sound" of yacht rock bore similarity to some of the East Coast soft rockers of the era such as Rupert Holmes and Hall & Oates, leading to the conflation.

=== 1980s ===
Chicago band logo. Their 1984 single "You're the Inspiration" from their fourteenth studio album Chicago 17 (1984) became synonymous with the soft rock radio format.

In the early 1980s, the radio format evolved into what came to be known as "adult contemporary" or "adult album alternative", a format that has less overt rock bias than its forebear radio categorization. In Los Angeles, KOST 103.5 FM, under program director Jhani Kaye, debuted its soft adult contemporary format in November 1982.

=== 1990s ===
Soft rock persisted in the 1990s, with artists from previous decades continuing to release new music, such as Genesis, whose 1992 soft rock single "Hold on My Heart" topped the Canadian singles chart and Billboard Adult Contemporary chart. Extreme's 1991 single "More Than Words" was internationally successful, topping the national singles charts in at least five countries, including Canada and the United States. Mr. Big's 1992 single "To Be with You" was a number one hit in at least twelve countries. Eric Clapton's 1992 single "Tears in Heaven" was also successful, topping the national singles charts in Canada, Ireland, New Zealand, and six other countries.

Richard Marx's 1994 single "Now and Forever" topped the Canadian adult contemporary chart and peaked in the top ten of the national singles charts in that country, Norway, and the United States. New bands and artists emerged such as the Danish band Michael Learns to Rock, who saw massive popularity in Asia, with many singles becoming commercially successful in the continent starting with their 1991 hit "The Actor", and Australian band Southern Sons, who enjoyed success on the ARIA Charts with three top 10 singles.

== See also ==
- Adult-oriented rock
- List of soft rock artists and songs
- Sentimental ballad
