= Carpenters Perform Carpenter =

Compilation album by the Carpenters
- Released: July 29, 2003
- Recorded: 1969–1983, 1997
- Genre: Pop
- Length: 1:06:32
- Label: A&M/Universal Music Distribution
- Producer: Richard Carpenter

The Carpenters chronology
The Essential Collection (2002)	Carpenters Perform Carpenter (2003)	Gold: 35th Anniversary Edition (2004)

Professional ratings
Review scores
Source	Rating
AllMusic	3/5 stars

Carpenters Perform Carpenter is a 2003 compilation album by the Carpenters.

== Overview ==
The album comprises songs written or co-written by Richard Carpenter. and serves as a counterpart the 1994 compilation Interpretations.

Carpenters Perform Carpenter features several of the duo's biggest hits such as "Top of the World" and "Yesterday Once More" combined with many lesser-known album cuts.

== Track listings ==
All tracks are written by Richard Carpenter and John Bettis, except otherwise noted.

No.	Title	Writer(s)	Original album (date)	Length
1.	"Top of the World" (Single version, 1991 remix)		A Song for You, 1972
2.	"Maybe It's You" (1990 remix)		Close to You, 1970
3.	"Crystal Lullaby" (1987 remix)		A Song for You
4.	"I Need to Be in Love" (1991 remix)	Carpenter, Bettis, Albert Hammond	A Kind of Hush, 1976
5.	"Sandy"		A Kind of Hush
6.	"Mr. Guder" (1990 remix)		Close to You
7.	"All of My Life" (1987 remix)	Carpenter, Frank Esler-Smith	Offering, 1969 (re-released as Ticket to Ride, 1970)
8.	"Yesterday Once More" (Single edit, 1985 remix)		Now & Then, 1973
9.	"One Love" (1994 remix)		Carpenters, 1971
10.	"Those Good Old Dreams"		Made in America, 1981
11.	"Because We Are in Love (The Wedding Song)"		Made in America
12.	"Only Yesterday"		Horizon, 1975
13.	"Eve" (1987 remix)		Offering
14.	"At the End of a Song"		Voice of the Heart, 1983
15.	"Goodbye to Love" (1985 remix)		A Song for You
16.	"Look to Your Dreams"	Carpenter, Bettis, Frank Esler-Smith	Voice of the Heart
17.	"Karen's Theme"	Carpenter	Pianist, Arranger, Composer, Conductor (Richard Carpenter solo, 1998)
18.	"Merry Christmas Darling" (Bonus Track)	Carpenter, Frank Pooler	Christmas Portrait, 1978
