= Live at the Palladium (The Carpenters album) =

Live album by the Carpenters
- Released: 1976
- Recorded: November 27, 1976
- Venues: London Palladium (London, England)
- Genre: Pop
- Length: 40:36
- Label: A&M
- Producer: Richard Carpenter/Associate Producer - Karen Carpenter

The Carpenters chronology
A Kind of Hush (1976)	Live at the Palladium (1976)	Passage (1977)

Live at the Palladium is the second live album by the American music duo the Carpenters. It was recorded during a week of live concerts at the London Palladium in November 1976. No singles were released from the album, although it reached number 28 on the UK Albums Chart. On the cover of the record, Karen is wearing the same dress as in The Carpenters' First Television Special. The album was remastered and reissued in the 1980s on the budget Pickwick music label and went Gold in the UK. This album was not released in the U.S. but was widely available as an import.

== Track listing ==
Side one
No.	Title	Writer(s)	Length
1.	"Flat Baroque"	Richard Carpenter	1:33
2.	"There's a Kind of Hush"	Les Reed; Geoff Stephens	2:16
3.	"Jambalaya (On the Bayou)"	Hank Williams	2:51
4.	"Piano Picker"/"Strike Up the Band"/"S'Wonderful"/"Fascinatin' Rhythm" (medley)	Randy Edelman / George Gershwin; Ira Gershwin / G. Gershwin; I. Gershwin / G. Gershwin; I. Gershwin	5:34
5.	"Warsaw Concerto"	Richard Addinsell	6:35
6.	"From This Moment On"	Cole Porter	2:11

Side two
No.	Title	Writer(s)	Length
7.	"(They Long to Be) Close to You"/"For All We Know"/"Top of the World"/"Ticket to Ride"/"Only Yesterday"/"I Won't Last a Day Without You"/"Hurting Each Other"/"Superstar"/"Rainy Days and Mondays"/"Goodbye to Love" (medley)	Burt Bacharach; Hal David / Fred Karlin; Robb Wilson; Arthur James / Carpenter; John Bettis / John Lennon; Paul McCartney / Carpenter; Bettis / Paul Williams; Roger Nichols / Peter Udell; Gary Geld / Leon Russell; Bonnie Bramlett / Williams; Nichols / Carpenter; Bettis / Williams; Nichols	15:44
8.	"We've Only Just Begun"	Williams; Nichols	3:52

== Personnel ==
Musicians

- Karen Carpenter – drums, percussion, vocals
- Richard Carpenter – keyboards, vocals
- Bob Messenger – bass, keyboards, tenor saxophone, flute
- Cubby O'Brien – drums
- Doug Strawn – keyboards, clarinet, vocals
- Tony Peluso – guitar, keyboards, bass
- Dan Woodhams – bass, vocals
- Dick Palombi – orchestra conductor

Production

- Richard Carpenter – producer, arranger, orchestrations
- Karen Carpenter – associate producer
- Frank Owen – engineer
- Jon Kelly – engineer
- Malcolm Davies – engineer
- Ray Gerhardt – engineer
- Jerry Weintraub – management

Design

- Roland Young – art director
- Chuck Beeson – art designer

== Charts ==
Chart (1977)	Peak position
Japanese Albums (Oricon)	24
UK Albums (Official Charts)	28

== Certifications ==
Region	Certification	Certified units/sales
United Kingdom (BPI)	Gold	100,000^{^}
^{^} Shipments figures based on certification alone.
