= The Nation's Favourite =

- Genre: Documentary
- Country of origin: United Kingdom
- Original language: English
- No. of episodes: 19

Production
- Running time: 60–120 minutes (inc. adverts)
- Production company: Shiver

Original release
- Network: ITV
- Release: 5 December 2010 – 12 November 2017

Related
- ITV Specials

The Nation's Favourite... is a British documentary series, celebrating music by a particular artist or popular genre, including ABBA, the Beatles, the Bee Gees, the Carpenters, Elton John, Elvis Presley, and Queen.

To date, 19 episodes have been shown with a variety of celebrity narrators, including David Walliams, Alison Steadman, Victoria Wood, Zoe Ball, Matt Lucas, Craig Charles, Rufus Hound, Fearne Cotton, Amanda Holden, and Stephen Mulhern.

Most Nation's Favourites are 90 minutes in duration. Each episode features exclusive interviews with the featured band or artist, as well as their songwriters, producers, musicians and celebrity fans. The series was made by Shiver (formerly part of ITV Studios).

== Episodes ==
No.	Title	Narrator	Original release date	Viewers (millions)
1	"The Nation's Favourite ABBA Song"	Kate Thornton	5 December 2010	5.70
Top 25: 1. "The Winner Takes It All" (1980); 2. "Dancing Queen" (1976); 3. "The Day Before You Came" (1982); 4. "Thank You for the Music" (1977); 5. "Knowing Me, Knowing You" (1977); 6. "Mamma Mia" (1975); 7. "Fernando" (1976); 8. "One of Us" (1981); 9. "The Name of the Game" (1977); 10. "Chiquitita" (1979); 11. "Gimme! Gimme! Gimme! (A Man After Midnight)" (1979); 12. "Take a Chance on Me" (1978); 13. "I Have a Dream" (1979); 14. "Lay All Your Love on Me" (1981); 15. "SOS" (1975); 16. "Super Trouper" (1980); 17. "Waterloo" (1974); 18. "Summer Night City" (1978); 19. "Does Your Mother Know" (1979); 20. "Voulez-Vous" (1979); 21. "Under Attack" (1982); 22. "Money, Money, Money" (1976); 23. "I Do, I Do, I Do, I Do, I Do" (1975); 24. "Head Over Heels" (1982); 25. "Ring Ring" (1973)
2	"The Nation's Favourite Bee Gees Song"	Amanda Holden	9 December 2011	3.81
Top 20: 1. "How Deep Is Your Love" (1977); 2. "You Win Again" (1987); 3. "Massachusetts" (1967); 4. "Words" (1968); 5. "Stayin' Alive" (1978); 6. "More Than a Woman" (1977); 7. "Night Fever" (1978); 8. "How Can You Mend a Broken Heart" (1971); 9. "Islands in the Stream" (1983); 10. "I've Gotta Get a Message to You" (1968); 11. "Tragedy" (1979); 12. "Too Much Heaven" (1978); 13. "To Love Somebody" (1967); 14. "Immortality" (1998); 15. "Jive Talkin'" (1975); 16. "You Should Be Dancing" (1976); 17. "Run to Me" (1972); 18. "Nights on Broadway" (1975); 19. "Chain Reaction" (1986); 20. "Guilty" (1980)
3–5	"The Nation's Favourite Number One Single"	Fearne Cotton	8 July 2012 (part one) 14 July 2012 (part two) 15 July 2012 (part three)	2.70 (part one) 2.75 (part two) 3.68 (part three)
Top 20: 1. "Bohemian Rhapsody" – Queen (1975 & 1991); 2. "Billie Jean" – Michael Jackson (1983); 3. "Someone like You" – Adele (2011); 4. "Don't Look Back in Anger" – Oasis (1996); 5. "Hey Jude" – The Beatles (1968); 6. "Imagine" – John Lennon (1981); 7. "...Baby One More Time" – Britney Spears (1999); 8. "Dancing Queen" – ABBA (1976); 9. "I Will Always Love You" – Whitney Houston (1992); 10. "Can't Get You Out of My Head" – Kylie Minogue (2001); 11. "Back for Good" – Take That (1995); 12. "Don't You Want Me" – The Human League (1981); 13. "Bridge over Troubled Water" – Simon & Garfunkel (1970); 14. "(Everything I Do) I Do It for You" – Bryan Adams (1991); 15. "Ashes to Ashes" – David Bowie (1980); 16. "Like a Prayer" – Madonna (1989); 17. "Wannabe" – Spice Girls (1996); 18. "Tainted Love" – Soft Cell (1981); 19. "Heart of Glass" – Blondie (1979); 20. "Do They Know It's Christmas?" – Band Aid (1984)
6	"The Nation's Favourite Christmas Song"	Liza Tarbuck	22 December 2012	1.61
Top 20: 1. "Fairytale of New York" – The Pogues featuring Kirsty MacColl (1987); 2. "I Wish It Could Be Christmas Everyday" – Wizzard (1973); 3. "Merry Xmas Everybody" – Slade (1973); 4. "White Christmas" – Bing Crosby (1974); 5. "All I Want for Christmas Is You" – Mariah Carey (1994); 6. "Do They Know It's Christmas?" – Band Aid (1984); 7. "Stop the Cavalry" – Jona Lewie (1980); 8. "Last Christmas" – Wham! (1984); 9. "I Believe in Father Christmas" – Greg Lake (1975); 10. "Happy Xmas (War Is Over)" – John Lennon & Yoko Ono/Plastic Ono Band (1972); 11. "When a Child Is Born" – Johnny Mathis (1976); 12. "Driving Home for Christmas" – Chris Rea (1986); 13. "Walking in the Air" – Aled Jones (1985); 14. "The Christmas Song" – Nat King Cole (1946); 15. "Wonderful Christmastime" – Paul McCartney (1979); 16. "Peace on Earth/Little Drummer Boy" – David Bowie and Bing Crosby (1982); 17. "Blue Christmas" – Elvis Presley (1964); 18. "Mary's Boy Child – Oh My Lord" – Boney M. (1978); 19. "Mistletoe and Wine" – Cliff Richard (1988); 20. "Lonely This Christmas" – Mud (1974)
7	"The Nation's Favourite Dance Moment"	Rufus Hound	22 June 2013	N/A
Top 20: 1. Gene Kelly (Singin' in the Rain, 1952); 2. Thriller (1983); 3. Torvill and Dean (1984); 4. Grease (1978); 5. Michael Jackson (Moonwalk, 1983); 6. Flashdance (1983); 7. Riverdance; 8. Top Hat (1935); 9. John Travolta (Saturday Night Fever, 1977); 10. Dirty Dancing (1987); 11. Psy ("Gangnam Style", 2012); 12. The Rocky Horror Picture Show ("Time Warp", 1975); 13. Slumdog Millionaire ("Jai Ho", 2008); 14. Kylie Minogue ("Can't Get You Out of My Head", 2001); 15. MC Hammer ("U Can't Touch This", 1990); 16. Christopher Walken ("Weapon of Choice", 2001); 17. Britney Spears ("...Baby One More Time", 1999); 18. Beyoncé ("Single Ladies", 2008); 19. Ann Widdecombe (Strictly Come Dancing, 2010); 20. Madonna ("Vogue", 1990)
8	"The Nation's Favourite Elvis Song"	Zoë Ball	8 November 2013	4.48
Top 20: 1. "Always on My Mind" (1972); 2. "Suspicious Minds" (1969); 3. "Can't Help Falling in Love" (1962); 4. "In the Ghetto" (1969); 5. "A Little Less Conversation" (1968/2002); 6. "Jailhouse Rock" (1958); 7. "Hound Dog" (1956); 8. "Love Me Tender" (1956); 9. "Return to Sender" (1962); 10. "Are You Lonesome Tonight" (1961); 11. "The Wonder of You" (1970); 12. "Blue Suede Shoes" (1956); 13. "All Shook Up" (1957); 14. "It's Now or Never" (1960); 15. "An American Trilogy" (1972); 16. "Heartbreak Hotel" (1956); 17. "Viva Las Vegas" (1964); 18. "Don't Be Cruel" (1956); 19. "If I Can Dream" (1969); 20. "King Creole" (1958)
9	"The Nation's Favourite Motown Song"	Craig Charles	6 July 2014	2.15
Top 20: 1. "I Heard It Through the Grapevine" – Marvin Gaye (1969); 2. "What Becomes of the Brokenhearted" – Jimmy Ruffin (1966); 3. "Ain't No Mountain High Enough" – Diana Ross (1970); 4. "Dancing in the Street" – Martha & The Vandellas (1964); 5. "My Girl" – The Temptations (1964); 6. "The Tears of a Clown" – Smokey Robinson & The Miracles (1970); 7. "I'll Be There" – The Jackson 5 (1970); 8. "Baby Love" – The Supremes (1964); 9. "War" – Edwin Starr (1970); 10. "Stop! In the Name of Love" – The Supremes (1965); 11. "I Want You Back" – The Jackson 5 (1970); 12. "Reach Out I'll Be There" – The Four Tops (1966); 13. "The Tracks of My Tears" – Smokey Robinson & The Miracles (1969); 14. "My Guy" – Mary Wells (1964); 15. "I Can't Help Myself (Sugar Pie Honey Bunch)" – The Four Tops (1965); 16. "My Cherie Amour" – Stevie Wonder (1969); 17. "What's Going On" – Marvin Gaye (1971); 18. "Papa Was a Rollin' Stone" – The Temptations (1972); 19. "Uptight (Everything's Alright)" – Stevie Wonder (1966); 20. "Jimmy Mack" – Martha & The Vandellas (1967)
10	"The Nation's Favourite Queen Song"	Matt Lucas	11 November 2014	2.72
Top 20: 1. "Bohemian Rhapsody" (1975 & 1991); 2. "We Will Rock You" (1977); 3. "Don't Stop Me Now" (1979); 4. "I Want to Break Free" (1984); 5. "We Are the Champions" (1977); 6. "Killer Queen" (1974); 7. "Under Pressure" (1981); 8. "Radio Ga Ga" (1984); 9. "These Are the Days of Our Lives" (1991); 10. "Somebody to Love" (1976); 11. "Who Wants to Live Forever" (1986); 12. "A Kind of Magic" (1986); 13. "Crazy Little Thing Called Love" (1979); 14. "Another One Bites the Dust" (1980); 15. "The Show Must Go On" (1991); 16. "Seven Seas of Rhye" (1974); 17. "You're My Best Friend" (1976); 18. "One Vision" (1985); 19. "It's a Hard Life" (1984); 20. "I Want It All" (1989)
11	"The Nation's Favourite 70s Number One"	Zoë Ball	5 March 2015	2.74
Top 20: 1. "Bohemian Rhapsody" – Queen (No. 1 in 1975 & 1991); 2. "Dancing Queen" – ABBA (No. 1 in 1976); 3. "Bridge over Troubled Water" – Simon and Garfunkel (No. 1 in 1970); 4. "Heart of Glass" – Blondie (No. 1 in 1979); 5. "Wuthering Heights" – Kate Bush (No. 1 in 1978); 6. "I Will Survive" – Gloria Gaynor (No. 1 in 1979); 7. "Night Fever" – Bee Gees (No. 1 in 1978); 8. "Without You" – Nilsson (No. 1 in 1972); 9. "I'm Not in Love" – 10cc (No. 1 in 1975); 10. "Y.M.C.A." – Village People (No. 1 in 1979); 11. "Hot Love" – T. Rex (No. 1 in 1971); 12. "December, 1963 (Oh, What a Night)" – Four Seasons (No. 1 in 1976); 13. "I Feel Love" – Donna Summer (No. 1 in 1977); 14. "Sailing" – Rod Stewart (No. 1 in 1975); 15. "Cum On Feel the Noize" – Slade (No. 1 in 1973); 16. "Band of Gold" – Freda Payne (No. 1 in 1970); 17. "Don't Go Breaking My Heart" – Elton John & Kiki Dee (No. 1 in 1976); 18. "Hit Me with Your Rhythm Stick" – Ian Dury & the Blockheads (No. 1 in 1979); 19. "Block Buster!" – Sweet (No. 1 in 1973); 20. "Rock Your Baby" – George McCrae (No. 1 in 1974)
12	"The Nation's Favourite 80s Number One"	Zoë Ball	25 July 2015	2.38
Top 20: 1. "Every Breath You Take" – The Police (No. 1 in 1983); 2. "Billie Jean" – Michael Jackson (No. 1 in 1983); 3. "Total Eclipse of the Heart" – Bonnie Tyler (No. 1 in 1983); 4. "Tainted Love" – Soft Cell (No. 1 in 1981); 5. "I Wanna Dance with Somebody" – Whitney Houston (No. 1 in 1987); 6. "Come On Eileen" – Dexys Midnight Runners (No. 1 in 1982); 7. "Don't You Want Me" – Human League (No. 1 in 1981); 8. "House of Fun" – Madness (No. 1 in 1982); 9. "Karma Chameleon" – Culture Club (No. 1 in 1983); 10. "True" – Spandau Ballet (No. 1 in 1983); 11. "China in Your Hand" – T'Pau (No. 1 in 1987); 12. "West End Girls" – Pet Shop Boys (No. 1 in 1986); 13. "Wake Me Up Before You Go-Go" – Wham! (No. 1 in 1984); 14. "Two Tribes" – Frankie Goes to Hollywood (No. 1 in 1984); 15. "Stand and Deliver" – Adam and the Ants (No. 1 in 1981); 16. "Don't Leave Me This Way" – The Communards (No. 1 in 1986); 17. "You Spin Me Round (Like a Record)" – Dead or Alive (No. 1 in 1985); 18. "Back to Life (However Do You Want Me)" – Soul II Soul (No. 1 in 1989); 19. "Into the Groove" – Madonna (No. 1 in 1985); 20. "Especially for You" – Kylie and Jason (No. 1 in 1989)
13	"The Sound of ITV – The Nation's Favourite Theme Tune"	Victoria Wood	16 September 2015	2.39
Top 20: 1. The Benny Hill Show (1969–1989); 2. Thunderbirds (1965–1966); 3. Tales of the Unexpected (1979–1988); 4. The Avengers (1961–1969); 5. Van der Valk (1972–1992); 6. Downton Abbey (2010–2015); 7. Inspector Morse (1987–2000); 8. Agatha Christie's Poirot (1989–2013); 9. Coronation Street (1960–present); 10. Minder (1979–1994); 11. ITV News at Ten (1967–present); 12. The Professionals (1977–1983); 13. The Sweeney (1975–1978); 14. Blockbusters (1983–1993); 15. The Adventures of Robin Hood (1955–1959); 16. Who Wants to Be a Millionaire? (1998–2014, 2018-present); 17. Emmerdale (1972–present); 18. World of Sport (1965–1985); 19. This Is Your Life (1969–1994); 20. Surprise Surprise (1984–2001)
14	"The Nation's Favourite Beatles Number One"	Alison Steadman	11 November 2015	2.62
Top 27: 1. "Hey Jude" (1968); 2. "Yesterday" (1965); 3. "Let It Be" (1970); 4. "Eleanor Rigby" (1966); 5. "All You Need Is Love" (1967); 6. "Penny Lane" (1967); 7. "I Want to Hold Your Hand" (1963); 8. "The Long and Winding Road" (1970); 9. "A Hard Day's Night" (1964); 10. "She Loves You" (1963); 11. "Come Together" (1969); 12. "Something" (1969); 13. "Can't Buy Me Love" (1964); 14. "Love Me Do" (1962); 15. "Help!" (1965); 16. "Ticket to Ride" (1965); 17. "We Can Work It Out" (1965); 18. "Eight Days a Week" (1965); 19. "Yellow Submarine" (1966); 20. "Hello, Goodbye" (1967); 21. "Lady Madonna" (1968); 22. "Get Back" (1969); 23. "Paperback Writer" (1966); 24. "From Me to You" (1963); 25. "I Feel Fine" (1964); 26. "Day Tripper" (1966); 27. "The Ballad of John and Yoko" (1969)
15	"The Nation's Favourite Bond Song"	David Walliams	17 December 2015	2.79
Top 20: 1. "Skyfall" – Adele (2012); 2. "Live and Let Die" – Paul McCartney & Wings (1973); 3. "Goldfinger" – Shirley Bassey (1964); 4. "Diamonds Are Forever" – Shirley Bassey (1971); 5. "Nobody Does It Better" – Carly Simon (1977); 6. "We Have All the Time in the World" – Louis Armstrong (1969); 7. "A View to a Kill" – Duran Duran (1985); 8. "For Your Eyes Only" – Sheena Easton (1981); 9. "From Russia with Love" – Matt Monro (1963); 10. "You Only Live Twice" – Nancy Sinatra (1967); 11. "GoldenEye" – Tina Turner (1995); 12. "Licence to Kill" – Gladys Knight (1989); 13. "The Living Daylights" – A-ha (1987); 14. "You Know My Name" – Chris Cornell (2006); 15. "Thunderball" – Tom Jones (1965); 16. "The Man with the Golden Gun" – Lulu (1974); 17. "Die Another Day" – Madonna (2002); 18. "The World Is Not Enough" – Garbage (1999); 19. "Tomorrow Never Dies" – Sheryl Crow (1997); 20. "Another Way to Die" – Jack White & Alicia Keys (2008)
16	"The Nation's Favourite Disney Song"	Stephen Mulhern	26 December 2015	2.2
Top 10: 1. "The Bare Necessities" (The Jungle Book, 1967); 2. "Circle of Life" (The Lion King, 1994); 3. "When You Wish Upon a Star" (Pinocchio, 1940); 4. "Let It Go" (Frozen, 2013); 5. "A Whole New World" (Aladdin, 1992); 6. "A Spoonful of Sugar" (Mary Poppins, 1964); 7. "Whistle While You Work" (Snow White and the Seven Dwarfs, 1937); 8. "He's a Tramp" (Lady and the Tramp, 1955); 9. "When I See an Elephant Fly" (Dumbo, 1941); 10. "You Can Fly! You Can Fly! You Can Fly!" (Peter Pan, 1953)
17	"The Nation's Favourite Carpenters Song"	Zoë Ball	3 September 2016	2.5
Top 20: 1. "Please Mr. Postman" (1974); 2. "We've Only Just Begun" (1970); 3. "Top of the World" (1973); 4. "(They Long to Be) Close to You" (1970); 5. "Calling Occupants of Interplanetary Craft" (1977); 6. "Rainy Days and Mondays" (1971); 7. "There's a Kind of Hush (All Over the World)" (1976); 8. "Yesterday Once More" (1973); 9. "Solitaire" (1975); 10. "Jambalaya (On the Bayou)" (1973); 11. "Goodbye to Love" (1972); 12. "Only Yesterday" (1975); 13. "Superstar" (1971); 14. "I Won't Last a Day Without You" (1974); 15. "Sing" (1973); 16. "For All We Know" (1971); 17. "I Need to Be in Love" (1976); 18. "Hurting Each Other" (1972); 19. "It's Going to Take Some Time" (1972); 20. "Touch Me When We're Dancing" (1981)
18	"Elton John: The Nation's Favourite Song"	David Walliams	12 November 2017	3.39
Top 20: 1. "Your Song" (1970); 2. "Candle in the Wind" (1974); 3. "Rocket Man" (1972); 4. "I'm Still Standing" (1983); 5. "Can You Feel the Love Tonight" (1994); 6. "Don't Go Breaking My Heart" (1976); 7. "Tiny Dancer" (1972); 8. "Don't Let the Sun Go Down on Me" (1974); 9. "I Guess That's Why They Call It the Blues" (1983); 10. "Crocodile Rock" (1972); 11. "Daniel" (1973); 12. "Goodbye Yellow Brick Road" (1973); 13. "Sorry Seems to Be the Hardest Word" (1970); 14. "Sacrifice" (1990); 15. "Bennie and the Jets" (1976); 16. "Are You Ready for Love" (1979); 17. "Nikita" (1985); 18. "Saturday Night's Alright for Fighting" (1973); 19. "Philadelphia Freedom" (1975); 20. "Someone Saved My Life Tonight" (1975)
