= The Singles: 1969–1973 =

The Singles 1969–1973

Compilation album by the Carpenters
- Released: November 9, 1973
- Recorded: 1969–1973
- Studio: A&M Studios (Los Angeles)
- Genres: Pop,Easy listening
- Length: 41:47
- Label: A&M
- Producers: Richard & Karen Carpenter, Jack Daugherty

The Carpenters chronology
Now & Then (1973)	The Singles 1969–1973 (1973)	Live in Japan (1975)

Professional ratings
Review scores
Source	Rating
AllMusic	4/5 stars
Christgau's Record Guide	C+
Džuboks	(favorable)
MusicHound Lounge	4/5 stars
The Rolling Stone Album Guide	3/5 stars

The Singles: 1969–1973 is a compilation album by the pop duo the Carpenters. It topped the charts in the United States and the United Kingdom and became one of the best-selling albums of the 1970s.

== Content ==
The compilation include a re-recorded single version of "Top of the World" and newly re-recorded "Ticket to Ride" specially for the compilation.

It also includes a number of musical introductions and segues between the songs "Superstar", "Rainy Days and Mondays" and "Goodbye to Love", the latter two were sped up in pitch, much to the regret of Richard in subsequent years.

Richard Carpenter gave the album this title because he doesn't like the term "greatest hits" because he felt it was "an overused thing". He continues:

Individuals and groups with two or three hits all of a sudden put them on an album, use filler for the rest and title it "greatest hits". This album contains eleven true hits and it just wasn't slapped together. We've remixed a few, re-cut one and joined a couple of others. It's simply something I believe we owe our audience and ourselves.

== Reception ==
On January 5, 1974, the album peaked at #1 on the Billboard 200, becoming the Carpenters' first and only number one album in the US. The Singles: 1969–1973 has been certified 7× platinum in the US, becoming Carpenters' best selling album to date in the US. In the UK, the album reached number 1 for 17 non-consecutive weeks. In Canada, the album was in the Top 100 for 33 weeks, and number 21 in the year-end chart.

== Critical reception ==
In their review, Billboard noted that "Karen's clear, clean, pristine tones have a glisten whether its heard on "We've Only Just Begun" or 'Top of the World." Placed end-to-end, the group's music has a compelling quality which stands the test of time. They are capable of making 'Ticket to Ride" by Lennon/McCartney their own special vehicle, principally because of Karen's slow, invoking vocal. Brother Richard's orchestrations and arrangements, plus his own sweet harmonizing on this and the other cuts, adds the middle and bottom ranges to Karen's top levels."

Cashbox described the album as a combination for Karen and Richard Carpenter, noting their influence on pop music history and predicting strong holiday season sales for the collection.

In the British magazine Music Scene, Richard Green wrote, "In terms of recording success it's almost impossible to fault the chippies and though they may not be your cup of tea, an awful lot of people seem to have a taste for the beverage. The fact that nine of the twelve tracks were million sellers must prove something."

AllMusic rated the album four stars, commenting that "there's a certain inherent sadness listening to this concise 12-song collection of the Carpenters' early hits, especially as it opens with "We've Only Just Begun," with its hopeful, dreamy lyrics - for it was never supposed to be definitive, just the first of at least two such collections. Listening to this material, it's easy to accuse the Carpenters of being hopelessly retro even in their own time. But the lush melodies brought out in Richard Carpenter's arrangements and Karen's singing are justification in themselves."

== Track listing ==
Side one
No.	Title	Writer(s)	Length
1.	"We've Only Just Begun"	Paul Williams; Roger Nichols	4:09
2.	"Top of the World" (Single version)	Richard Carpenter; John Bettis	2:56
3.	"Ticket to Ride" (Re-recorded version)	Lennon–McCartney	4:10
4.	"Superstar"	Bonnie Bramlett; Leon Russell	3:49
5.	"Rainy Days and Mondays"	Williams; Nichols	3:40
6.	"Goodbye to Love"	Carpenter; Bettis	3:50

Side two
No.	Title	Writer(s)	Length
1.	"Yesterday Once More"	Carpenter; Bettis	3:50
2.	"It's Going to Take Some Time"	Carole King; Toni Stern	2:55
3.	"Sing"	Joe Raposo	3:20
4.	"For All We Know"	Fred Karlin; Jimmy Griffin; Robb Royer	2:34
5.	"Hurting Each Other"	Gary Geld; Peter Udell	2:46
6.	"(They Long to Be) Close to You"	Burt Bacharach; Hal David	3:44

Notes

- "We've Only Just Begun" begins with an excerpt of "(They Long to Be) Close to You" and contains elements of "Superstar."
- "Superstar," "Rainy Days and Mondays," and "Goodbye to Love" are continuously mixed.

== Personnel ==
- Bernie Grundman, Richard Carpenter – 1999 CD, 2014 SHM SACD and 2014 SHM CD remastering at Bernie Grundman Mastering
- Richard Carpenter - 1991 remastering

== EP ==
US 7" promo (1973); A&M LLP 238

1. "Ticket to Ride" (1973 version)
2. "(They Long to Be) Close to You"
3. "We've Only Just Begun"
4. "Top of the World"
5. "Rainy Days and Mondays"

== Charts ==
=== Weekly charts ===
Chart (1973–1975)	Peak position
Canada Top Albums/CDs (RPM)	1
Dutch Albums (Album Top 100)	2
Finnish Albums (The Official Finnish Charts)	16
UK Albums (Official Charts)	1
US Billboard 200	1
US Cash Box Top 200 Albums	1
Chart (1990)	Peak position
Australian Albums (ARIA)	129
European Albums (Eurotipsheet)	80
UK Albums (Official Charts)	24
Chart (1995)	Peak position
Belgian Albums (Ultratop Flanders)	17
Chart (2000)	Peak position
Australian Albums (ARIA)	19

=== Year-end charts ===
Chart (1974)	Position
Canada Top Albums/CDs (RPM)	21
Chart (1975)	Position
UK Albums (OCC)	10

== Certifications and sales ==
Region	Certification	Certified units/sales
Canada (Music Canada)	Platinum	100,000^{^}
Netherlands	—	100,000
United Kingdom (BPI)	Platinum	300,000^{^}
United States (RIAA)	7× Platinum	7,000,000^{^}
^{^} Shipments figures based on certification alone.
