= Pianist, Arranger, Composer, Conductor =

Studio album by Richard Carpenter
- Released: January 27, 1998
- Recorded: 1997
- Studios: Capitol (Hollywood, California)
- Genres: Easy listening; lounge
- Label: A&M
- Producer: Richard Carpenter

Richard Carpenter chronology
Time (1987)	Pianist, Arranger, Composer, Conductor (1998)	Richard Carpenter's Piano Songbook (2022)

Singles from Pianist, Arranger, Composer, Conductor
- 1. "Karen's Theme" Released: 1997

Professional ratings
Review scores
Source	Rating
AllMusic	4/5 stars
MusicHound Lounge	1.5/5 stars

Pianist, Arranger, Composer, Conductor is the second solo album by American musician Richard Carpenter, released in 1998.

== Overview ==
The album includes instrumental versions of songs by the Carpenters and Richard's album Time, and is dedicated to their deceased mother, Agnes Carpenter.

The album contains two new songs, "All Those Years Ago" and "Karen's Theme", with the latter being released as a single.

== Track listing ==
1. "Prelude" (Richard Carpenter) – 0:57
2. "Yesterday Once More" (John Bettis, Richard Carpenter) – 3:41
3. Medley – 12:12
  - "Sing" (Joe Raposo)
  - "Goodbye to Love" (John Bettis, Richard Carpenter)
  - "Eve" (John Bettis, Richard Carpenter)
  - "Rainy Days and Mondays" (Roger Nichols, Paul Williams)
  - "Look to Your Dreams" (John Bettis, Richard Carpenter)
  - "Superstar" (Bonnie Bramlett, Leon Russell)
  - "Someday" (John Bettis, Richard Carpenter)
4. "I Need to Be in Love" (John Bettis, Richard Carpenter, Albert Hammond) – 3:09
5. "Sandy" (John Bettis, Richard Carpenter) – 3:50
6. "Time" (Richard Carpenter, Dave Clark) – 3:34
7. "For All We Know" (Arthur James, Fred Karlin, Robb Wilson) – 3:37
8. "One Love" (John Bettis, Richard Carpenter) – 4:58
9. "Bless the Beasts and Children" (Perry Botkin, Jr., Barry De Vorzon) – 3:29
10. "Flat Baroque" (Richard Carpenter) – 1:51
11. "All Those Years Ago" (Richard Carpenter, Pamela Phillips Oland, Tim Rice) – 2:24
12. "Top of the World" (John Bettis, Richard Carpenter) – 3:21
13. "We've Only Just Begun" (Roger Nichols, Paul Williams) – 2:26
14. "Karen's Theme" (Richard Carpenter) – 2:40

== Personnel ==
- Karen Carpenter - drums, vocals
- Earl Dumler - English horn, oboe
- Jim Gordon - drums
- Norm Herzberg - bassoon
- James Kanter - clarinet
- Paul Leim - drums
- Harvey Mason - drums
- Timothy May - banjo, guitar
- Tommy Morgan - harmonica
- O.K. Chorale - vocals
- Joe Osborn - bass
- Tony Peluso - guitar
- John Phillips - tenor saxophone
- Sheridon Stokes - flute, recorder
