= List of awards and nominations received by the Carpenters =

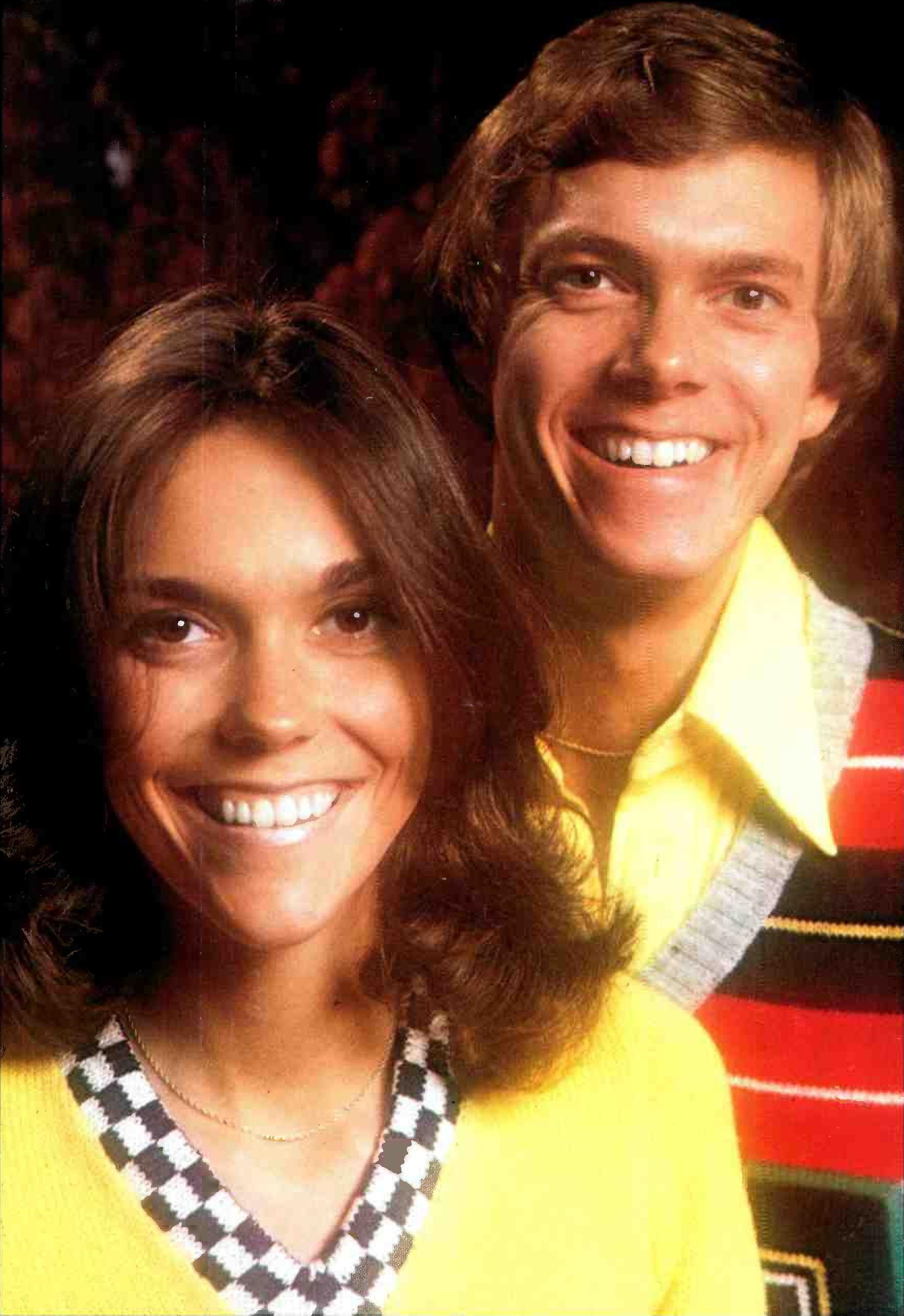
The Carpenters in 1974

The American pop group the Carpenters, featuring siblings Karen and Richard Carpenter, have received several awards and nominations, both in their active career and posthumously.

Throughout the 1970s, Karen and Richard were nominated numerous times for Grammy Awards. Richard Carpenter was also nominated for a Grammy Award for their instrumental song, "Flat Baroque". They won three Grammy Awards, and had two songs inducted into the Grammy Hall of Fame.

== American Music Awards ==
Year	Category	Nominated work	Ref.
1974	Favorite Pop/Rock Band/Duo/Group	Carpenters	Won

== Grammy Awards ==
Year	Category	Nominated work	Ref.
1971	Album of the Year	Close to You	Nominated
1971	Best Engineered Album	Close to You	Nominated
1971	Best New Artist	Carpenters	Won
1971	Record of the Year	"(They Long to Be) Close to You"	Nominated
1971	Best Contemporary Vocal Performance by a Duo, Group or Chorus	"(They Long to Be) Close to You"	Won
1971	Best Instrumental Arrangement Accompanying Vocals	"(They Long to Be) Close to You"	Nominated
1971	Song of the Year	"We've Only Just Begun"	Nominated
1971	Best Contemporary Song	"We've Only Just Begun"	Nominated
1972	Album of the Year	Carpenters	Nominated
1972	Best Pop Vocal Performance by a Duo or Group	Carpenters	Won
1972	Best Engineered Recording	Carpenters	Nominated
1972	Best Instrumental Arrangement Accompanying Vocals	"Superstar"	Nominated
1972	Best Album of Original Score, Written for a Motion Picture	"Bless the Beasts and Children"	Nominated
1973	Best Instrumental Arrangement Accompanying Vocals	"Flat Baroque"	Nominated
1974	Best Pop Vocal Performance by a Duo, Group or Vocal	"Sing"	Nominated
1974	Best Instrumental Arrangement Accompanying Vocals	"Sing"	Nominated
1975	Best Instrumental Arrangement Accompanying Vocals	"We've Only Just Begun"	Nominated
1978	Best Instrumental Arrangement Accompanying Vocals	"Calling Occupants of Interplanetary Craft"	Nominated
