= I Won't Last a Day Without You =

1972/1974 single by The Carpenters

Single by Carpenters

from the album A Song for You
- B-side: "One Love" (US) / "Goodbye to Love" (UK double A-side)
- Released: September 1972 (UK) / March 25, 1974 (US)
- Recorded: 1972
- Studio: A&M (Hollywood, California)
- Genre: Pop
- Length: 3:52
- Label: A&M
- Songwriters: Paul Williams; Roger Nichols
- Producers: Richard Carpenter, Karen Carpenter, Jack Daugherty

Carpenters singles chronology
"Jambalaya (On the Bayou)" (1974)	"I Won't Last a Day Without You" (1972)	"Please Mr. Postman" (1974)

A Song for You track listing
- 13 tracks Side one: 1. "A Song for You"; 2. "Top of the World"; 3. "Hurting Each Other"; 4. "It's Going to Take Some Time"; 5. "Goodbye to Love"; 6. "Intermission"; Side two: 1. "Bless the Beasts and Children"; 2. "Flat Baroque"; 3. "Piano Picker"; 4. "I Won't Last a Day Without You"; 5. "Crystal Lullaby"; 6. "Road Ode"; 7. "A Song for You (Reprise)"

"I Won't Last a Day Without You" is a song by Carpenters with lyrics written by Paul Williams and music composed by Roger Nichols. The writing duo had previously contributed "We've Only Just Begun" and "Rainy Days and Mondays" to the Carpenters.

== Composition and recording ==
The song was written by Paul Williams (lyrics) and Roger Nichols (music) who also wrote two previous hits for Carpenters – "We've Only Just Begun" and "Rainy Days and Mondays". According to the lyricist Paul Williams, the line "when there's no getting over that rainbow" in the chorus is a reference to the song "Over the Rainbow" from The Wizard of Oz.

Williams said that the song was originally written with just two verses and a chorus, and a demo was submitted to Carpenters in 1971. However, just before the song was due to be recorded, a request was sent to the songwriters for an additional bridge and a third verse to be added. The songwriters managed to comply with this last-minute request, and they recorded a demo the day before the recording, to the displeasure of Carpenters who felt the song was not sent to them soon enough. Richard Carpenter also changed the bridge and chord structure, changes Williams felt detracted from the song and he believed that Carpenters would have greater success if they had recorded the song unchanged.

The song was recorded as a track for Carpenters' album A Song for You, and was released two years later as a single in the US. Williams himself later recorded the song as it was written, as did Barbra Streisand and Diana Ross.

== Release ==
The song was released in the UK in September 1972, paired with "Goodbye to Love" as a double-A side single for A Song for You. The single reached No. 9 and spent 15 weeks on the chart.

It was later released in the U.S. and became a hit single for them in 1974, reaching No. 11 on the Billboard Hot 100 chart No. 1 one on the Easy Listening chart, the ninth No. 1 for Carpenters.

== Chart performance ==
=== Weekly charts ===
Chart (1974)	Peak position
Canadian RPM Top Singles	7
Canadian RPM Adult Contemporary	1
Quebec (ADISQ)	13
Oricon International Singles Chart	1
UK Singles (Official Charts)	32
Australia (Kent Music Report)	63
US Radio & Records CHR/Pop Airplay Chart	10
US Billboard Hot 100	11
US Adult Contemporary (Billboard)	1
US Cash Box Top 100	9
US Cash Box Radio Active Airplay Singles	1

=== Year-end charts ===
Chart (1974)	Position
Canada	104
US Cash Box	99

== Personnel ==
- Karen Carpenter – lead and backing vocals
- Richard Carpenter – backing vocals, piano, Wurlitzer electric piano, orchestration
- Joe Osborn – bass guitar
- Tony Peluso – electric guitar
- Hal Blaine – drums
- Louie Shelton – electric guitar
- Earl Dumler – English horn
- Uncredited – tambourine

== Other versions ==
Many artists have released other versions of "I Won't Last a Day Without You". Among the most notable are:

- Paul Williams, the lyricist for the song, recorded the song for the 1972 album Life Goes On. It was released as a single in 1973, but his rendition garnered only minor success, reaching 106 on the Bubbling Under chart and No. 40 on the Adult Contemporary chart.
- Maureen McGovern released it as a single in 1973 (and included it on her album The Morning After), reaching No. 89 Billboard, No. 72 Cash Box and No. 14 Adult Contemporary. In Canada, her version reached No. 12 AC. The Carpenters released their single the following year.
- Al Wilson created a medley of "I Won't Last a Day Without You" with another Nichols/Williams composition "Let Me Be The One" for his 1974 album La La Peace Song. The medley was issued as a single in December 1974 and went to No. 18 on the R&B chart in Billboard magazine; it crossed over to both Billboard's Adult Contemporary chart (No. 39), and to the mainstream Pop chart the Billboard Hot 100 (No. 70).
- Vince and Dianne Hatfield recorded a version which reached No. 83 on the Country chart.

== See also ==
- List of number-one adult contemporary singles of 1974 (U.S.)
