= If I Were a Carpenter (tribute album) =

Studio album by Various Artists
- Released: September 13, 1994
- Genre: Alternative rock
- Length: 49:06
- Label: A&M
- Producers: Matt Wallace & Dave Konjoyan

Professional ratings
Review scores
Source	Rating
AllMusic	4/5 stars
Entertainment Weekly	A−
Los Angeles Times	2.5/4 stars
MusicHound Lounge	4/5 stars
Rolling Stone	4/5 stars

If I Were a Carpenter is a 1994 tribute album to the Carpenters. It features alternative rock bands covering the songs of Richard and Karen Carpenter.

== Overview ==
The cover is a painting, in Margaret Keane style, of Richard and Karen Carpenter listening to an LP album against an orange background. Regarding the musical interpretations, Richard Carpenter has said that he doesn't "care for" the version of "Superstar" by Sonic Youth.

The album was the brainchild of Matt Wallace (Maroon 5, Replacements, Faith No More) and David Konjoyan.

== Reception ==
Rolling Stone praised the album, calling it "an affectionate, almost reverent tribute to the Carpenters... For those who dismiss the notion of a Carpenters revival as some kind of joke – hey, if Nixon received re-evaluation, why not the Carpenters? – the fact that this tribute album mostly plays it straight will come as a surprise. But for the more open-minded, listening to If I Were a Carpenter and going back to the originals movingly evokes an era we've only just begun to come to terms with."

In their review, Billboard noted that "as concepts go, this went one step beyond: Bring together cutting edge acts such as Sheryl Crow, Shonen Knife, the Cranberries, and Babes In Toyland, and turn them loose on hits like "Close To You" and 'We've Only Just Begun" from '70s pop icons Richard & Karen Carpenter. But it works, and as much more than a goof, partly because there is nary a snicker in sight, and largely because, despite their gooey heart, these are, at bottom, solid songs."

Cashbox stated "Mark Eitzel’s a cappella opening to American Music Club’s version of “Goodbye To Love” pretty much says it all. Eitzel’s opening lies somewhere between reverence and dark satire, which is pretty much the case with this salute to the Carpenters, America’s sweethearts of the ’70s... The hype is justified in the sense that the album’s eccentricities live up to what everyone expected."

Allmusic gave the album a positive review, stating "released among a bevy of tribute albums, If I Were a Carpenter registers as one of the best of the lot, with spot-on performances of Carpenters classics from the '70s. Unlike many tribute collections, this CD gets it right most of the time, thanks to a lineup of artists suited to the duo's wide-screen pop mix...And, while being impressed by the sheer range and originality of these interpretations, listeners will also discover the overlooked songwriting talents of Paul Williams, Roger Nichols, Leon Russell, Neil Sedaka, and Richard Carpenter. A must for the post-punk-savvy Carpenters fan."

== Use in media ==
The album, and specifically the Sonic Youth cover of "Superstar," featured prominently in the 2007 film Juno; "Superstar" was included on the Juno soundtrack.

== Track listing ==
No.	Title	Artist	Length
1.	"Goodbye to Love"	American Music Club	3:12
2.	"Top of the World"	Shonen Knife	3:55
3.	"Superstar"	Sonic Youth	4:06
4.	"(They Long to Be) Close to You"	The Cranberries	2:40
5.	"For All We Know"	Bettie Serveert	3:27
6.	"It's Going to Take Some Time"	Dishwalla	4:16
7.	"Solitaire"	Sheryl Crow	4:43
8.	"Hurting Each Other"	Johnette Napolitano with Marc Moreland	4:09
9.	"Yesterday Once More"	Redd Kross	3:58
10.	"Calling Occupants of Interplanetary Craft"	Babes In Toyland	4:06
11.	"Rainy Days and Mondays"	Cracker	3:44
12.	"Let Me Be the One"	Matthew Sweet	3:26
13.	"Bless the Beasts and Children"	4 Non Blondes	4:17
14.	"We've Only Just Begun"	Grant Lee Buffalo	3:51

== Charts ==
Chart (1994)	Peak position
New Zealand Albums Chart	34
UK Compilation Albums (Official Charts)	27
US Billboard 200	69
US Cash Box Top 200 Albums	74
Canada Top Albums/CDs (RPM)	47
