= It's Going to Take Some Time =

Single by Carpenters

from the album A Song for You
- B-side: "Flat Baroque"
- Released: April 13, 1972
- Recorded: Early 1972
- Studio: A&M (Hollywood, California)
- Genre: Pop
- Length: 2:58
- Label: A&M
- Songwriters: Carole King; Toni Stern
- Producer: Jack Daugherty

Carpenters singles chronology
"Hurting Each Other" (1971)	"It's Going to Take Some Time" (1972)	"Goodbye to Love" (1972)

A Song for You track listing
- 13 tracks Side one: 1. "A Song for You"; 2. "Top of the World"; 3. "Hurting Each Other"; 4. "It's Going to Take Some Time"; 5. "Goodbye to Love"; 6. "Intermission"; Side two: 1. "Bless the Beasts and Children"; 2. "Flat Baroque"; 3. "Piano Picker"; 4. "I Won't Last a Day Without You"; 5. "Crystal Lullaby"; 6. "Road Ode"; 7. "A Song for You (Reprise)"

"It's Going to Take Some Time" is a song written by Carole King and Toni Stern for King’s 1971 album, Music. It was redone by the Carpenters in 1972 for their fourth album, A Song for You. According to Richard Carpenter, he had to choose which songs he wanted to remake, and there was a big pile of 7-inch singles he had to listen to. When he encountered "It's Going to Take Some Time", he knew it would be a hit, and recorded it. The song peaked at number 12 on the Billboard Hot 100. Tim Weisberg played the bass flute, but the flute solo was played by Bob Messenger on a (standard) alto flute.

King is quoted as saying that the duo's lush, string-laden cover, including a flute solo, made her own more sparse version sound "like a demo".

According to musicologist James E. Perone, the lyrics describe someone recovering from a relationship that has ended. They contrast the current situation, where the singer sings that "it's going to take some time this time" with her future recovery from the sadness. Perone interprets the syncopations of much of the music as reflecting her recovery, but notes that the smoother, unsyncopated music at the end of each verse bring her back to the present day reality.

Actress Jessie Mueller, who portrayed King in the Broadway musical Beautiful: The Carole King Musical, regards "It's Going to Take Some Time" as one of her favorite King songs, adding that King "knows how to write a breakup song! She can encapsulate a feeling and mood so well, and with such depth and simplicity at the same time."

Jazz organist Richard "Groove" Holmes recorded an instrumental version on his 1973 album Night Glider.

The band Dishwalla covered the song on the 1994 tribute album, If I Were a Carpenter.

== Personnel ==
- Karen Carpenter – lead and backing vocals
- Richard Carpenter – backing vocals, Wurlitzer electronic piano, piano, orchestration
- Joe Osborn – bass guitar
- Hal Blaine – drums
- Bob Messenger – alto flute & solo
- Tim Weisberg – bass flute

== Chart performance ==
=== Weekly charts ===
Chart (1972)	Peak position
US Billboard Hot 100	12
US Adult Contemporary (Billboard)	2
US Cashbox Radio Active Airplay Singles	2
U.S. Record World	13
Australia	24
Canada RPM Top Singles	14
Canada RPM Adult Contemporary	1
Oricon (Japanese) Singles Chart	48
New Zealand (Listener)	15
Quebec (ADISQ)	20
US Cash Box Top 100	17

=== Year-end charts ===
Chart (1972)	Rank
Australia	178
U.S. (Joel Whitburn's Pop Annual)	110
