= Flat Baroque =

Instrumental by the Carpenters

Single by the Carpenters

from the album A Song for You
- A-side: "It's Going to Take Some Time"
- Released: April 29, 1972
- Recorded: Winter 1971–1972
- Studio: A&M (Hollywood, California)
- Genre: Pop
- Length: 1:48
- Label: A&M
- Songwriter: Richard Carpenter
- Producer: Jack Daugherty

The Carpenters singles chronology
"Hurting Each Other" (1971)	"Flat Baroque" (1972)	"Goodbye to Love" (1972)

A Song for You track listing
- 13 tracks Side one: 1. "A Song for You"; 2. "Top of the World"; 3. "Hurting Each Other"; 4. "It's Going to Take Some Time"; 5. "Goodbye to Love"; 6. "Intermission"; Side two: 1. "Bless the Beasts and Children"; 2. "Flat Baroque"; 3. "Piano Picker"; 4. "I Won't Last a Day Without You"; 5. "Crystal Lullaby"; 6. "Road Ode"; 7. "A Song for You (Reprise)"

"Flat Baroque" is a song composed by Richard Carpenter in 1966, during his joint career with John Bettis at Disneyland. It lay dormant until 1970, when Carpenter and his sister, Karen Carpenter, appeared on a syndicated radio show, called Your Navy Presents. They performed a slow, jazzy version of the song with the oboe being the main star. Carpenter did not think of recording a studio version of the song for record release until 1972 with the release of the album, A Song for You. This cut is much faster than the Your Navy Presents version, and features the piano rather than the oboe. The song gained Richard a Grammy award nomination in 1972 for Best Instrumental Arrangement Accompanying Vocals. In April 1972, it was released as the B-side song to "It's Going to Take Some Time".

== Personnel ==
- Richard Carpenter – piano, orchestration
- Karen Carpenter – drums
- Joe Osborn – bass
- Earl Dumler – English horn
- Norm Herzberg – bassoon
