= A Song for You (The Carpenters album) =

Studio album by the Carpenters
- Released: June 13, 1972
- Recorded: April 16, 1971 - March 25, 1972
- Studio: A&M (Hollywood)
- Genres: Pop; soft rock; easy listening; adult contemporary
- Length: 36:57
- Label: A&M
- Producer: Jack Daugherty Productions

The Carpenters chronology
Carpenters (1971)	A Song for You (1972)	Now & Then (1973)

Singles from A Song for You
- 1. "Bless the Beasts and Children" Released: August 12, 1971; 2. "Hurting Each Other" Released: December 23, 1971; 3. "It's Going to Take Some Time" Released: April 13, 1972; 4. "Goodbye to Love" Released: June 19, 1972; 5. "Top of the World" Released: September 17, 1973; 6. "I Won't Last a Day Without You" Released: March 25, 1974

Professional ratings
Review scores
Source	Rating
AllMusic	4.5/5 stars
MusicHound Lounge	0/5 stars
Rolling Stone	(Average)
The Rolling Stone Album Guide	4/5 stars

A Song for You is the fourth studio album by the American music duo the Carpenters, released on June 13, 1972. According to Richard Carpenter, A Song for You was intended to be a concept album (of sorts) with the title tune opening and closing the set and the bookended selections comprising the 'song'. "A Song for You" was written and originally performed by Leon Russell.

In Cash Box's Top 100 Albums of 1972, A Song for You was ranked number 26.

Six songs were released as A-side singles internationally: "Hurting Each Other", "It's Going to Take Some Time", "Goodbye to Love", "Top of the World", "I Won't Last a Day Without You", and "Bless the Beasts and Children".

== Singles ==
"Hurting Each Other", a cover of an obscure Ruby & the Romantics tune, was the first single issued from A Song for You in early 1972, and reached number two, becoming the Carpenters' sixth straight gold single. A cover of Carole King's "It's Going to Take Some Time" followed and peaked at number 12, and was followed by the number seven hit "Goodbye to Love", which was refused airplay on some easy listening radio stations because of a fuzz guitar solo by Tony Peluso. The song had a significant impact on the power ballad songs which followed. The album also included the Carpenters' version of the Academy Award-nominated title song from the 1971 film Bless the Beasts and Children, which had already charted at number 67 on the Hot 100 as the flip side of the duo's version of "Superstar".

The album's biggest hit single, the number one song "Top of the World", was not issued until over a year after the album's release. According to Richard Carpenter, who co-wrote the song with John Bettis, the reason for the song's late release in the US was that he had misjudged the song's commercial appeal, but was proven wrong when the Carpenters' "Top of the World" became a hit in Japan in 1972 and Lynn Anderson's cover reached number 2 on the US country charts in 1973. The song went through a few minor revisions, including a slight remix, before it was finally released as a single in the US. The Carpenters' treatment of the much-covered Paul Williams/Roger Nichols composition "I Won't Last a Day Without You" also got a belated single release in 1974, and peaked at number eleven on the Hot 100.

With the exception of "Bless the Beasts and Children", which peaked at number 26 on the AC chart, all of the album's charted singles made either number one ("Hurting Each Other", "I Won't Last a Day Without You") or number two on the Adult Contemporary chart. The album and its singles were also successful internationally; "Goodbye to Love" and "I Won't Last a Day Without You" made the top ten on the UK Singles Chart as a double A-side, and "Top of the World" made the Oricon singles chart in Japan on three occasions (number 21 in 1972, number 52 in 1973, and number 83 in 1996).

== Critical reception ==
Billboard noted "here's a super LP which will be another top seller for the Carpenters. Superb Jack Daugherty production and musicianship showcase the fine talent on such tunes as 'I Won't Last a Day Without You' (by Paul Williams), 'Crystal Lullaby' (both by Richard Carpenter and John Bettis). Includes 'Hurting Each Other' and 'It's Going to Take Some Time.' Also dynamite readings of the title tune and of 'Goodbye to Love' (also by Carpenter and Bettis)."

In their review, Cashbox stated that "the new Carpenters - where to begin? The cover, maybe. It's a beautiful deep red - almost hypnotizing. Moving along to the record inside, we have nothing to offer but praise. Opening with Leon Russell's masterwork, 'A Song For You,' Karen and Richard offer warm and irrefutable proof that in their particular field they have no equals. There's a lot of variety on this album and a nice air of playfulness. Listen to 'Flat Baroque' for example. Less surprising but no less welcome are hits like 'Hurting Each Other' and 'It's Going To Take Some Time.' Watch this album rocket into the top ten. "

Bruce Eder of AllMusic called it "the duo's best album," and "the high point of their recording career", The review noted that the album was "brimming with lovely musical ideas even more lovingly executed, laced with good humor, and enough hits of its own to have established any artist's career on its own. And even in between the hits, the album was built on material that could have made a whole career for anyone."

== Track listing ==
All lead vocals by Karen Carpenter, except where noted.

Side one
No.	Title	Writer(s)	Length
1.	"A Song for You"	Leon Russell	4:42
2.	"Top of the World"	John Bettis; Richard Carpenter	2:56
3.	"Hurting Each Other"	Gary Geld; Peter Udell	2:46
4.	"It's Going to Take Some Time"	Carole King; Toni Stern	2:55
5.	"Goodbye to Love"	Bettis; R. Carpenter	3:50
6.	"Intermission" (lead vocals: K. and R. Carpenter)	R. Carpenter	0:22

Side two
No.	Title	Writer(s)	Length
7.	"Bless the Beasts and Children"	Perry Botkin Jr.; Barry DeVorzon	3:07
8.	"Flat Baroque" (instrumental)	R. Carpenter	1:45
9.	"Piano Picker" (lead vocals: R. Carpenter)	Randy Edelman	1:59
10.	"I Won't Last a Day Without You"	Roger Nichols; Paul Williams	3:47
11.	"Crystal Lullaby" (lead vocals by K. and R. Carpenter)	Bettis; R. Carpenter	3:53
12.	"Road Ode"	Gary Sims; Dan Woodhams	3:50
13.	"A Song for You" (Reprise)	Russell	0:53

== Personnel ==
- Karen Carpenter – lead and backing vocals, drums
- Richard Carpenter – lead and backing vocals, piano, Wurlitzer electronic piano, Hammond organ, celesta, orchestration
- Tony Peluso – lead guitar
- Louie Shelton – guitar
- Red Rhodes – steel guitar
- Buddy Emmons – pedal steel guitar on "Top of the World"
- Joe Osborn – bass guitar
- Hal Blaine – drums
- Earl Dumler – oboe, English horn
- Bob Messenger – tenor saxophone, flute, alto flute
- Tim Weisberg – bass flute on "It's Going to Take Some Time"
- Norm Herzberg – bassoon
- Gary Coleman – percussion on "Hurting Each Other"
- Gayle Levant – harp
- Bernie Grundman, Richard Carpenter – remastering at Bernie Grundman Mastering

== Charts ==
=== Weekly charts ===
Chart (1972–1974)	Peak position
Australian Albums (Kent Music Report)	6
Canada Top Albums/CDs (RPM)	5
Japanese Albums (Oricon	5
UK Albums (Official Charts)	13
US Billboard 200	4
US Cash Box Top 200 Albums	4

=== Year-end charts ===
Chart (1972)	Position
US Billboard 200	78

== Certifications ==
Region	Certification	Certified units/sales
Japan (Oricon Charts)	—	102,000
United Kingdom (BPI)	Gold	100,000^{^}
United States (RIAA)	3× Platinum	3,000,000^{^}
^{^} Shipments figures based on certification alone.
