= A Kind of Hush (album) =

1976 album by the Carpenters

Studio album by the Carpenters
- Released: June 11, 1976
- Recorded: December 1975 – April 1976
- Studios: A&M Studios, Hollywood
- Genres: Pop, easy listening, adult contemporary
- Length: 34:00
- Label: A&M
- Producer: Richard Carpenter/Associate Producer - Karen Carpenter

The Carpenters chronology
Horizon (1975)	A Kind of Hush (1976)	Live at the Palladium (1976)

Singles from A Kind of Hush
- 1. "There's a Kind of Hush" Released: February 12, 1976; 2. "I Need to Be in Love" Released: May 21, 1976; 3. "Goofus" Released: June 11, 1976; 4. "Breaking Up Is Hard to Do" Released: 1976

A Kind of Hush is the seventh studio album by the American music duo the Carpenters. It was released on June 11, 1976.

== Background ==
By the time of the album's recording, Richard Carpenter's addiction to sleeping pills had begun to affect him professionally, and he blames this for the album being, in his opinion, sub-par.

John Bettis called "I Need to Be in Love" the favorite lyrics he ever wrote for Karen Carpenter. "If there was ever anything that came out of my heart straight to Karen's I would say that was it. I was very proud of it for that." Richard Carpenter recalled that the song "became Karen's favorite Carpenters song".

The album was also the first not to have Karen playing drums on any tracks, which were performed by Los Angeles session drummer Jim Gordon (except two, "Goofus" and "Sandy," by Cubby O'Brien).

== Commercial performance ==
"There's a Kind of Hush (All Over the World)", a cover of a 1960s song by Herman's Hermits, was released as a lead single and topped the adult contemporary chart, however reached only #12 on the main US chart. It also reached the UK Top 30

"I Need to Be in Love" hit number 25 in the US and number 36 in the UK.

"Goofus" was only a minor success, stalling at number 56 on the Billboard chart, though it did crack the adult contemporary top 10.

Despite being certified Gold, the album was a relative commercial disappointment in the US, where its chart peak was outside the Top 30 and its lead single peaking outside the Top 10, the first time since Close to You in 1970.

Like its predecessor Horizon, it performed better in the UK, reaching number three in the UK Albums Chart.

== Reception ==
Professional ratings
Review scores
Source	Rating
AllMusic	3/5 stars
MusicHound Lounge	1.5/5 stars
The Rolling Stone Album Guide	2.5/5 stars

In their review of the album, Billboard called it an "exceptionally pretty album, with even more emphasis on Karen Carpenter's versatile, excellent vocals than in past efforts. Soft, easy ballads filled with the lush production of Richard Carpenter dominate the set, though the material alternates from the straight ballad form to easy rock to almost vaudevillian material to supper club, piano bar styled music. Keyboards handled well by Richard, who has always takes somewhat of a backseat when it comes to performing but does as good a job of production as anyone in the business. Most impressive and noticeable change is the different arrangements and styles tackled by Karen."

Cashbox praised the album, stating that "the dynamic duo of the MOR/easy listening idiom have come up with another winner. “A Kind Of Hush" is a clean collection of tunes that is truly representative of the kind of music that the Carpenters are famous for — smooth, ingratiating melodies that bear their contemporary trademark. This LP is bound to be an instant success with both the pop and MOR audiences, with the title tune and their cover of the Neil Sedaka hit, "Breaking Up Is Hard To Do” standing out as prime shots for the AM market."

AllMusic's retrospective review was more mixed, calling the album "pleasant, well-sung, and well-played, but basically bland....If you close your eyes, it's possible to imagine Captain & Tennille, not to mention Debby Boone, taking lessons from this release, although Karen's voice was still beyond comparison with any of them".

== Track listing ==
Side one
No.	Title	Writer(s)	Length
1.	"There's a Kind of Hush"	Les Reed; Geoff Stephens	2:57
2.	"You"	Randy Edelman	3:52
3.	"Sandy"	Richard Carpenter; John Bettis	3:42
4.	"Goofus"	William Harold; Gus Kahn; Wayne King	3:09
5.	"Can't Smile Without You"	Chris Arnold ∙ David Martin ∙ Geoff Morrow	3:28

Side two
No.	Title	Writer(s)	Length
6.	"I Need to Be in Love"	Carpenter; Bettis; Albert Hammond	3:47
7.	"One More Time"	Lewis Anderson	3:32
8.	"Boat to Sail"	Jackie DeShannon	3:31
9.	"I Have You"	Carpenter; Bettis	3:27
10.	"Breaking Up Is Hard to Do"	Neil Sedaka; Howard Greenfield	2:35

== Personnel ==
- Karen Carpenter - Drums, Vibraphone, Vocals, Background Vocals
- Richard Carpenter - Arranger, Keyboards, Orchestration, Vibraphone, Vocals, Background Vocals
- Frank DeLuna - Mastering
- Earl Dumler - English Horn, Oboe
- Ray Gerhardt - Engineer
- Jim Gordon - Drums
- Jim Horn - Baritone Saxophone
- Dave Iveland - Assistant Engineer
- Wes Jacobs - Tuba
- Gayle Levant - Harp
- Bob Messenger - Flute, Tenor Saxophone
- Cubby O'Brien - Drums
- Joe Osborn - Bass
- Tony Peluso - Guitar
- Tom Scott - Clarinet, Flute
- David Shostac - Flute
- Doug Strawn - Whistle

== Charts ==
=== Weekly charts ===
Chart (1976)	Peak position
Australian Albums Kent Music Report	57
Canada Top Albums/CDs (RPM)	22
Japanese Albums (Oricon)	3
New Zealand Albums (RMNZ)	15
Norwegian Albums (VG-lista)	17
UK Albums (Official Charts)	3
US Billboard 200	33
US Cash Box Top 200 Albums	29

=== Year-end charts ===
Chart (1976)	Peak position
Japanese Albums (Oricon)	39

== Certifications ==
Region	Certification	Certified units/sales
Hong Kong (IFPI Hong Kong)	Gold	10,000^{*}
Japan (RIAJ)	—	81,000
United Kingdom (BPI)	Gold	100,000^{^}
United States (RIAA)	Gold	500,000^{^}
^{*} Sales figures based on certification alone.^{^} Shipments figures based on certification alone.
