= Hurting Each Other =

Single by Carpenters

from the album A Song for You
- B-side: "Maybe It's You"
- Released: December 23, 1971
- Recorded: October 12, 1971
- Studio: A&M Studios
- Genre: Pop
- Length: 2:48
- Label: A&M
- Songwriters: Gary Geld; Peter Udell
- Producer: Jack Daugherty

Carpenters singles chronology
"Bless the Beasts and Children" (1971)	"Hurting Each Other" (1971)	"It's Going to Take Some Time" / "Flat Baroque" (1972)

A Song for You track listing
- 13 tracks Side one: 1. "A Song for You"; 2. "Top of the World"; 3. "Hurting Each Other"; 4. "It's Going to Take Some Time"; 5. "Goodbye to Love"; 6. "Intermission"; Side two: 1. "Bless the Beasts and Children"; 2. "Flat Baroque"; 3. "Piano Picker"; 4. "I Won't Last a Day Without You"; 5. "Crystal Lullaby"; 6. "Road Ode"; 7. "A Song for You (Reprise)"

Music video
- "Hurting Each Other" on YouTube

"Hurting Each Other" is a song popularized by the Carpenters in 1972. It was written in 1965 by Gary Geld and Peter Udell, and has been recorded many times by artists ranging from Ruby & the Romantics to Rosemary Clooney.

== History ==
=== Early versions ===
The original version of the song was recorded by Jimmy Clanton and released in 1965 as a single on Mala Records. According to Richard Carpenter, this version of "Hurting Each Other" had a very different feel from the Carpenters' product. However, there are definite similarities in the vocal refrain. Clanton's 1965 single of the song failed to chart.

Chad Allan & the Expressions, who later became The Guess Who, also recorded the song in 1965 on their Canadian LP Hey Ho (What You Do to Me!). Released as a single, the song hit #19 on the Canadian charts in early 1966. In June 1966 a version by Ruth Lewis, produced by Udell and Geld, was released as a single by RCA Victor records. A version also appeared on The Walker Brothers' second album, Portrait, which was released in November 1966.

Ruby & the Romantics released the song as a single in 1969. The vocal arrangement is reflected in the Carpenters' version three years later.

=== Carpenters' version ===
The Carpenters recorded "Hurting Each Other" with instrumental backing from L.A. sessions musicians from the Wrecking Crew, towards the end of 1971. Some footage of Richard and Karen performing the backup vocals can be seen on Jerry Dunphy Visits the Carpenters, when news anchor Jerry Dunphy went to Karen and Richard Carpenter's house and interviewed them and their parents about their life.

It was released as a single in late 1971 from the album A Song for You. It reached number two on the Billboard Hot 100; it was kept from number one by "Without You" by Harry Nilsson. It also became Carpenters' sixth top-ten single in the Billboard Hot 100. "Hurting Each Other" also peaked at number one on the Easy Listening chart. Billboard ranked it as the No. 65 song for 1972.

The Carpenters performed "Hurting Each Other" at many live concerts, including a shortened version from the "Live in Osaka" concert in 1974.

== Personnel ==
- Karen Carpenter - lead and backing vocals
- Richard Carpenter - backing vocals, piano, Wurlitzer electronic piano, orchestration
- Joe Osborn - bass
- Hal Blaine - drums
- Gary Coleman - percussion

== Chart performance ==
=== Weekly charts ===
Chart (1971–1972)	Peak position
Australia	4
Canadian RPM Top Singles	2
Canadian RPM Adult Contemporary	3
Japan (Oricon) Singles Chart	56
New Zealand (Listener)	7
Quebec (ADISQ)	11
South Africa (Springbok)	18
US Billboard Hot 100	2
US Adult Contemporary (Billboard)	1
US Cashbox Radio Active Airplay Singles	1
US Cash Box Top 100	2

=== Year-end charts ===
Chart (1972)	Rank
Australia	23
Canada	74
U.S. Billboard Hot 100	65
U.S. Cash Box	36

== Post-Carpenters versions ==
- A version performed by Johnette Napolitano of Concrete Blonde and Marc Moreland of Wall of Voodoo appeared on producer Matt Wallace's alternative rock tribute album of Carpenters covers, If I Were a Carpenter (1994).
- Australian electronic group the Avalanches sampled the Carpenters' chorus for their song "We Go On", on their album We Will Always Love You (2020).

== See also ==
- List of number-one adult contemporary singles of 1972 (U.S.)
