= Merry Christmas Darling =

"Merry Christmas, Darling"
- Picture sleeve for the 1970 U.S. vinyl single

Single by the Carpenters
- B-side: "Mr. Guder"
- Released: November 22, 1970
- Recorded: Autumn 1970
- Genre: Christmas
- Length: 3:05
- Label: A&M
- Songwriters: Frank Pooler, Richard Carpenter
- Producer: Jack Daugherty

The Carpenters singles chronology
"We've Only Just Begun" (1970)	"Merry Christmas, Darling" (1970)	"For All We Know" (1971)

"Merry Christmas, Darling" is a Christmas song by the Carpenters (music by Richard Carpenter, lyrics by Frank Pooler), and originally recorded in 1970.

== Original version ==
The song was first available on a 7-inch single that year (A&M Records 1236), and was later re-issued in 1974 as a B-side to “Santa Claus Is Coming to Town” (A&M 1648) and again in 1977 as the B-side to “The Christmas Song (Chestnuts Roasting on an Open Fire” (A&M 1991). The single went to number one on Billboard's Christmas singles chart in 1970 (and did so again in 1971 and 1973) and peaked at number 41 on Cashbox.

Richard Carpenter himself calls the original recording one of his sister's very best.

The original single version of the song can be found on the box sets From the Top and The Essential Collection: 1965–1997.

== Re-recorded version ==
In 1978, the Carpenters issued their Christmas Portrait album, which contained a new version of "Merry Christmas Darling". The original 1970 mix continued to be used for all single releases, however. The major difference between the 1970 and 1978 versions is a newly recorded vocal by Karen Carpenter on the latter, which was done at her request.

In 2018, a version of "Merry Christmas Darling" featuring Karen Carpenter's vocals with new instrumentation appeared on the album The Carpenters With The Royal Philharmonic Orchestra, produced by Richard Carpenter.

== History ==
The lyrics were written in 1946 by 20-year-old Frank Pooler, which, according to him, were about a love interest he had at the time. Twenty years later in 1966, when he was choral director at California State University, Long Beach, two of his aspiring music students, Karen and Richard Carpenter, who were beginning to have success as a local band, asked him if he had any ideas for holiday songs. According to Pooler, they had become tired of the standard holiday songs they were singing. Pooler gave them the lyrics of the song he had written from years before, and told them he did not think much of the original melody. According to Pooler, Richard wrote a new tune for the lyrics—the tune currently used—in 15 minutes. Four years later, in 1970, the Carpenters first recorded and released it as a single.

The song contrasts the warmth of the holiday season with lamenting the absence of a loved one. In the lyrics, the singer has already prepared for Christmas: cards written, logs on the fire, the tree lit. Even so, she still expresses yearning for the one she misses: "I've just one wish on this Christmas Eve/I wish I were with you."

== Personnel ==
- Karen Carpenter - lead and backing vocals
- Richard Carpenter - backing vocals, piano, celesta, Wurlitzer electric piano, orchestration
- Joe Osborn - bass
- Hal Blaine - drums
- Bob Messenger - tenor saxophone
- Uncredited - vibraphone

== Other versions ==
Elvis Presley almost recorded his own version in the early 1970s, but struggled learning the bridge, as he could not read music, and gave up.

In 1999, Amy Grant recorded a version for her third Christmas album, A Christmas to Remember. It was a hidden track, uncredited on the artwork and available only on copies purchased at Target.

The song was covered by Lea Michele on "A Very Glee Christmas", the 10th episode of the second season of Glee. It is featured on the Glee: The Music, The Christmas Album.

In 2013, the song was covered by Briana Cash on her "All Around Me, It's Christmas", album featuring other well known covers and two original Christmas songs, "All Around Me, It's Christmas" and "It's Christmas Time and I Feel Love" also covered by the Broadway star of WICKED's Christine Dwyer.

Leslie Odom, Jr. Simply Christmas Deluxe Album 2016

In 2020, for the 50th anniversary of the song, Canadian singer Lennon Stella covered "Merry Christmas Darling" for Amazon Music's Originals playlist.

In December 2020, musical theater star Liz Callaway recorded a cover of "Merry Christmas Darling" for her album Comfort and Joy (An Acoustic Christmas).

In 2023, Lizzy McAlpine released a cover of “Merry Christmas, Darling” on SoundCloud.

== Charts ==
Chart (1970)	Peak position
Canada RPM Top Singles	50
US Cashbox Radio Active Airplay Singles	3
US Cashbox Top 100 Singles	41
US Best Bet For Christmas Singles (Billboard)	1

Chart (1971)	Peak position
UK Singles (Official Charts)	45

Chart (1990)	Peak position
Europe (Eurochart Hot 100)	74
Ireland (IRMA)	18
UK Singles (Official Charts)	25

Chart (2003)	Peak position
US Holiday Airplay (Billboard)	1

Chart (2012)	Peak position
US Holiday 100 (Billboard)	24

Chart (2019)	Peak position
US Rolling Stone Top 100	60

== Other charting versions ==
=== Glee Cast version ===
Chart (2010–2011)	Peak position
Canada AC (Billboard)	48
US Holiday Digital Songs (Billboard)	34
