= Marie Pooler =

Ida Marie Weinhardt Pooler (22 April 1928 - 28 August 2013) was an American composer, educator, pianist and writer who composed, edited and arranged sacred choral music and texts. She published under the name Marie Pooler.

== Early life ==
Pooler was born in Wisconsin to Alice Marie and Elmer Ferdinand Weinhardt. She earned a B.A. in music at St. Olaf College (Northfield, Minnesota) and a M.A. at California State University Fullerton. Her M.A. thesis was Analyses of Choral Settings of the Te Deum by the Contemporary Composers Benjamin Britten, Leo Sowerby, Halsey Stevens, and Vincent Persichetti. In 1949, she married Frank Pooler. They had two daughters before divorcing in 1968.

== Career ==
Pooler taught music from 1949-1951 at Shimer College, Illinois; from 1957-1967 in unspecified public schools; and beginning in 1971 at Long Beach City College, California. She ended her career at Rancho Santiago Community College (Santa Ana, California) as the Assistant Dean of the Department of Fine and Performing Arts. In retirement, she was a volunteer teacher of English as a second language.

== Compositions ==
Pooler occasionally collaborated with Frank Pooler. She also transcribed and edited several works by Polish composer Witold Lutoslawski. Her compositions were published by Augsburg Fortress Publishers, Colla Voce Music, G. Schirmer Inc., H.W. Gray, Lorenz Publishing Company, and Shawnee Press, and included:

- A Spring Carol
- About Mr. Tralalinsky (by Witold Lutoslawski; edited by Pooler)
- All Praise to Thee
- Austrian Carol
- Be Thou My Vision (traditional; arranged by Pooler)
- Children of the Heavenly Father
- December Song
- God is Great, God is Good
- Goin’ Away
- Harper’s Creek (with Frank Pooler)
- He Prayeth Best Who Loveth Best
- Hosanna, Hosanna, the Little Children
- I am the Light of the World
- I’m Singing, I’m Singing
- Jungst (Recently)
- Kommet Ihr Hirten (Come, Ye Shepherds)
- Let All Little Children Sing Glory
- Oh to Have Been (with G. Allan and G. Knight)
- Pitter, Patter, Pitter, Patter
- Praise the Lord, His Glories Show
- Ride On in Majesty (with Frank Pooler)
- Simple Gifts (traditional; arranged by Pooler)
- The World Itself Keeps Easter Day
- Three Children’s Songs (by Witold Lutoslawski; edited by Pooler)
- To You is Born this Day
- Truly Blest
- Two Christmas Songs
- Two Nightingales (by Witold Lutoslawski; edited by Pooler)
- We Are Glad
- Wings of the Morning
- You Made Every Part of Me
