= Goofus (song) =

Single by Carpenters

from the album A Kind of Hush
- B-side: "Boat to Sail"
- Released: June 11, 1976
- Recorded: Early 1976
- Genre: Pop
- Length: 3:09
- Label: A&M
- Songwriters: Gus Kahn, William Harold and Wayne King
- Producer: Richard and Karen Carpenter

Carpenters singles chronology
"I Need to Be in Love" (1976)	"Goofus" (1976)	"Breaking Up Is Hard to Do" (1976)

"Goofus" is a song with music written by Wayne King and William Harold and lyrics by Gus Kahn.

== Popular cover versions ==
Les Paul recorded the song in 1950 and his version was released by Capitol Records as catalog number 1192. The record first reached the Billboard charts on September 29, 1950, peaking at number 21.

Phil Harris released his version on October 13, 1950. It was released by RCA Victor Records as catalog number 20–3968. The other side of the release, The Thing. became the hit but the matrix number of Harris' single shows Goofus as the A-side. Chet Atkins recorded "Goofus" in 1960 for the studio album Chet Atkins' Workshop, RCA Victor catalog LSP-2232.

=== The Carpenters version ===
The Carpenters attempted to repopularize the song in 1976, when it was released as a single from their album A Kind of Hush. However, as a sign of the duo's declining popularity at the time, it was the first Carpenters A-side single since "Ticket to Ride" in 1970 to fail to make the top 40 portion of the Billboard Hot 100, or to reach either #1 or #2 on the Easy Listening chart.

==== Chart performance ====
Chart (1976)	Peak position
US Billboard Hot 100	56
US Adult Contemporary (Billboard)	4
Canadian Singles Chart	82
US Cash Box Top 100	87
