= I Need to Be in Love =

- Single picture sleeve

Single by Carpenters

from the album A Kind of Hush
- B-side: "Sandy"
- Released: May 21, 1976
- Recorded: 1976
- Genre: Pop
- Length: 3:25 (single version); 3:49 (album version)
- Label: A&M
- Songwriters: Richard Carpenter; John Bettis; Albert Hammond
- Producer: Richard Carpenter

Carpenters singles chronology
"There's a Kind of Hush (All Over the World)" (1976)	"I Need to Be in Love" (1976)	"Goofus" (1976)

A Kind of Hush track listing
- 10 tracks: 1. "There's a Kind of Hush"; 2. "You"; 3. "Sandy"; 4. "Goofus"; 5. "Can't Smile Without You"; Side two: 1. "I Need to Be in Love"; 2. "One More Time"; 3. "Boat to Sail"; 4. "I Have You"; 5. "Breaking Up Is Hard to Do"

"I Need to Be in Love" is a song written by Richard Carpenter, Albert Hammond and John Bettis. It was released as a single on May 21, 1976. It was featured on the A Kind of Hush album, which was released on June 11 of the same year.

== Background ==
The single featured a version without the piano lead-in and starts immediately with a flute introduction by David Shostac. Richard recalled that it was Karen's favorite Carpenters song.

== Re-release ==
In 1995, it was released as a CD single in Japan, after being chosen for the theme song of the drama Miseinen. It was taken from the best-selling compilation 22 Hits of the Carpenters (promoted as a double A-side with "Top of the World"). On his website, Richard Carpenter wrote that "It became one of the biggest sellers of 1995, ultimately going quadruple platinum. In more ways than one, Karen would have loved that!"

== Reception ==
Cash Box said that it starts with a "beautiful string introduction" and that "Karen Carpenter's voice slips in with a sweet ballad melody."

== Personnel ==
- Karen Carpenter - lead vocals
- Richard Carpenter - piano, Fender Rhodes electric piano, harpsichord, Hammond organ, orchestration
- Joe Osborn - bass
- Tony Peluso - electric guitar
- Jim Gordon - drums
- Earle Dumler - English horn
- Gayle Levant - harp
- David Shostac - flute
- The O.K. Chorale - backing vocals

== Chart performance ==
Chart (1976)	Peak position
US Billboard Hot 100	25
US Adult Contemporary (Billboard)	1
Canada Top Singles (RPM)	24
Canada RPM Adult Contemporary	1
Ireland (IRMA)	14
Japanese Singles Chart (Oricon)	62
UK Singles (Official Charts)	36
Australia (Kent Music Report)	47
US Cash Box Top 100	31
Chart (1995)	Peak position
Japan (Oricon)	5

== Certifications ==
Region	Certification	Certified units/sales
Japan (RIAJ) I Need to Be in Love / Top of the World	4× Platinum	450,000
Japan (RIAJ) Digital	Gold	100,000^{*}
^{*} Sales figures based on certification alone.

== See also ==
- List of number-one adult contemporary singles of 1976 (U.S.)
