= Frank Pooler =

American conductor

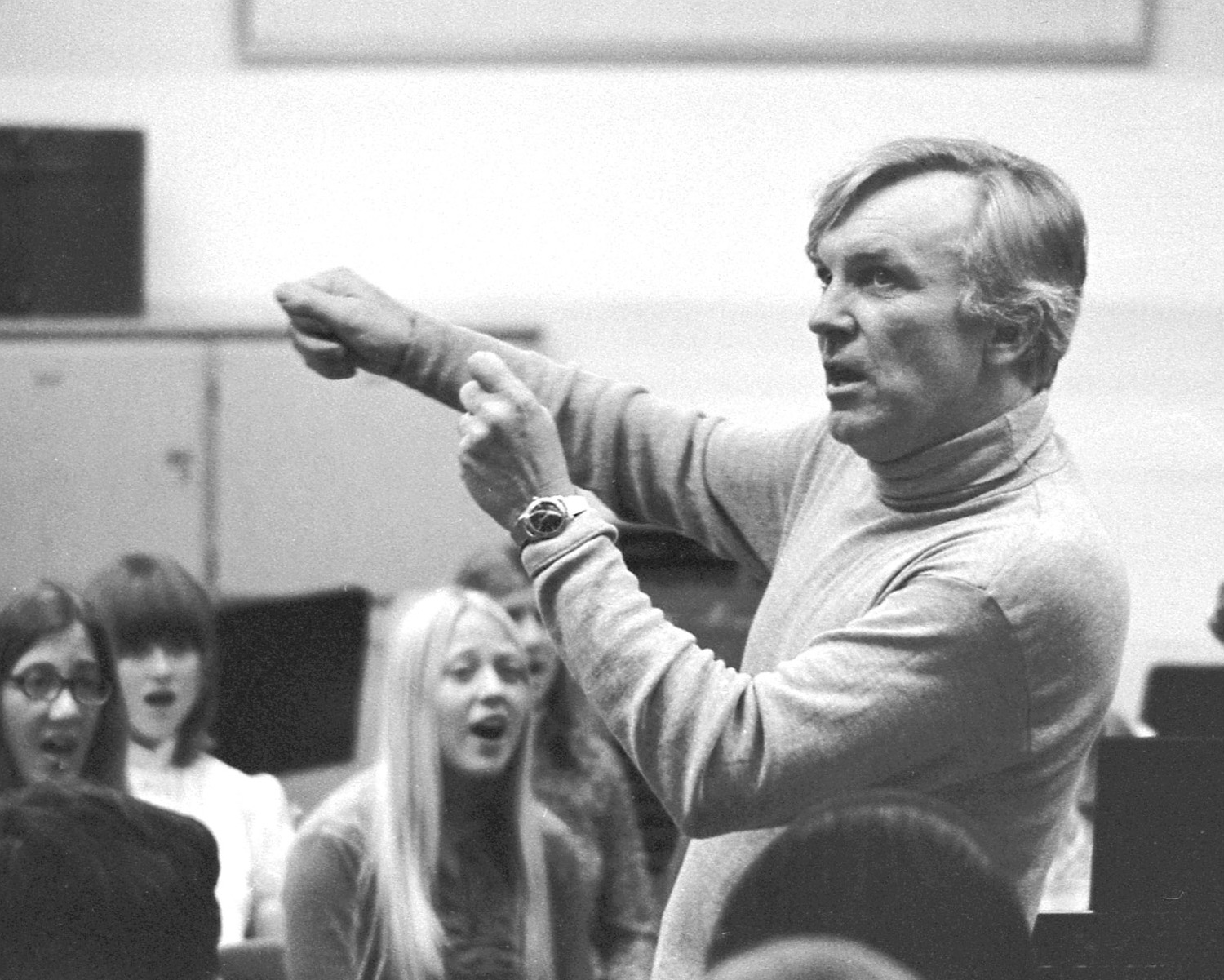
Frank Pooler conducting in the 1970s

Frank Mairich Pooler (March 29, 1926 – January 19, 2013) was an American choirmaster and the director of choral studies at California State University, Long Beach. He also collaborated with pop music group The Carpenters.

== Professional career ==
Known in both academic and professional music circles for his mastery of contemporary choral repertoire, Pooler served as a guest conductor, clinician, lecturer and adjudicator throughout the continental United States, Canada, Europe, Scandinavia, Australia, New Zealand, Japan, Hawaii, and Alaska. He published over 500 compositions, arrangements and editions which have been performed in Europe and North America. Articles by Frank Pooler in the area of choral art have been published in major professional journals, and he was a member of the Editorial Board of the "Choral Journal."

In 1943, while still a high school student, Pooler founded and directed the first children's choir at First (Norwegian) Lutheran Church. in 1953, studied and worked with Scandinavian composers in Norway, Sweden and Denmark resulting in the English publication of more than 100 Scandinavian choral works. In 1955, he was named a Fellow of the American-Scandinavian Foundation.

He worked for a year after that as the music director at the First Baptist Church in Albert Lea, Minnesota, before attending the University of Iowa and earning a master's degree. From there he worked for several years at Shimer College, then in Mount Carroll, Illinois. He often said that the years at Shimer were among the happiest and most productive of his life. He went on to work a brief stint at New Trier High School in Chicago.

In the middle of the winter of 1959 in Chicago, that he received a phone call from a former University of Iowa colleague, asking if he wanted to come to California to work at Long Beach State University. Frank's answer was "what's the temperature there?" He established the Department of Choral Music and taught at CSULB for 28 years, before retiring in 1988.

In the mid-1970s, he also taught summer school in Saratoga Springs, New York, at Skidmore College. He gave graduate level classes as part of the State University of New York (Potsdam) "Saratoga Potsdam Choral Institute" (SPCI), directed by Brock MacElheran.

== Collaboration with The Carpenters ==
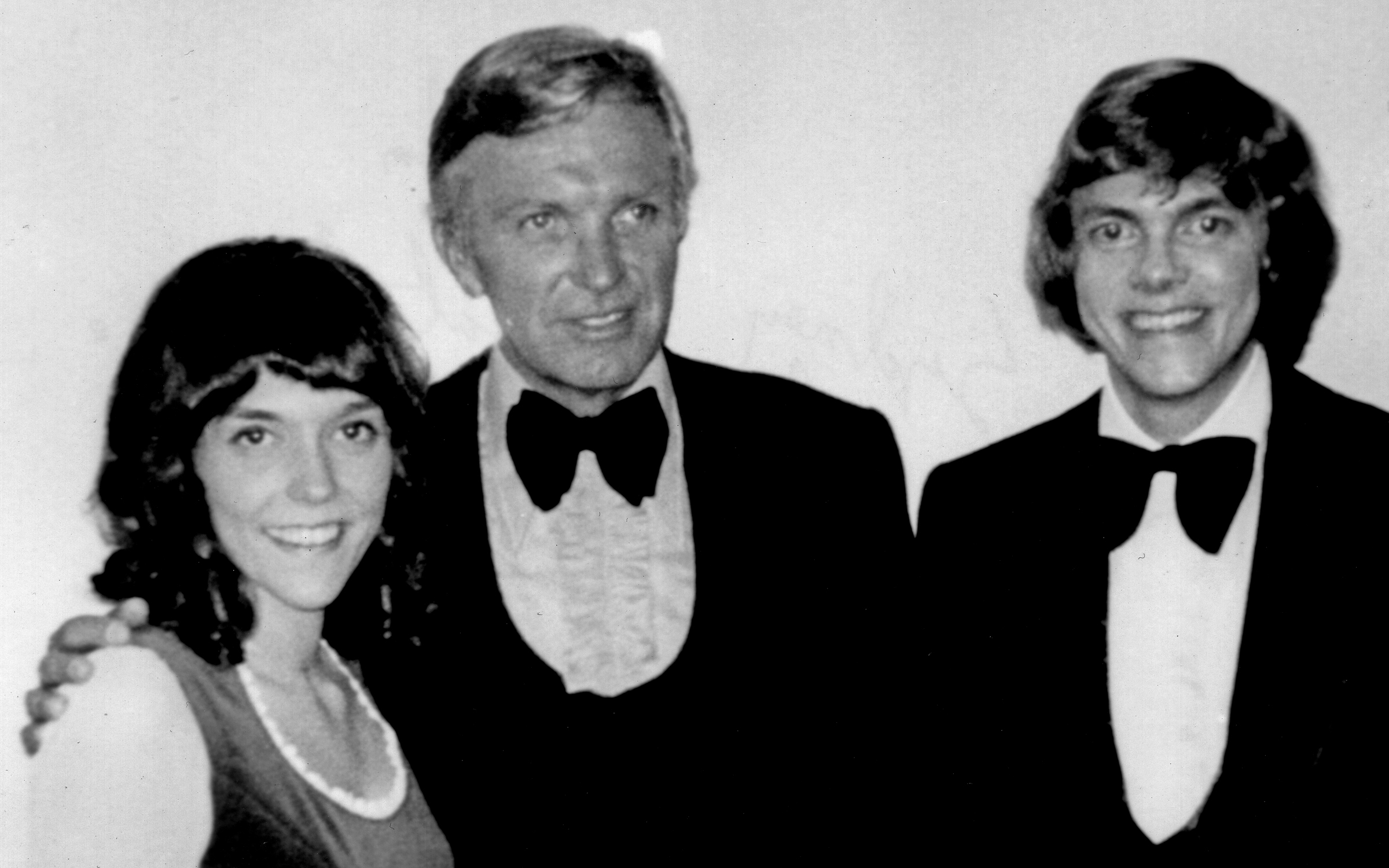
Frank Pooler with Karen and Richard Carpenter

Richard Carpenter accompanied Pooler's University Choir at California State University, Long Beach. Several years later, Karen Carpenter also joined the choir and recorded "Goodnight," "Crescent Noon," and "And When I Die" with the choir in 1969. Karen's parents hired Frank to give Karen music lessons

Richard Carpenter later composed the music to "Merry Christmas Darling," a lyric Pooler had written when he was 18. Karen later said,

"'Merry Christmas Darling' I think, is a little extra special to both of us, because Richard wrote it, and the lyrics were written by the choral director at Long Beach State choir, where we went to school, Frank Pooler. Frank was very helpful in our college days, when we were trying to get a contract and constantly missing classes and everything. He was the only one down there who actually understood what we were after, and he stood behind us all the way. We just did a benefit at Long Beach State, for a scholarship fund, and we did it with the choir and the whole thing, and we did "Christmas Darling" and he just "glows" every time we do it….. I think it's my favorite, because it's really close to me."

== Personal life ==
Frank Pooler was born and raised in Onalaska, Wisconsin. He attended St. Olaf College in Northfield, Minnesota, and earned a bachelor's degree there. While there he acquired a love for choral music while singing under Olaf Christiansen, son of the noted choral director, F. Melius Christiansen.

In 1949, he married, and occasionally collaborated with, the composer Ida Marie Weinhardt, known professionally as Marie Pooler. They had two daughters before divorcing in 1968.

Pooler died January 19, 2013, from lung cancer at his home in Los Alamitos, California.

== Publications and awards ==
The Frank Pooler Collection album contains the published, written/composed, arranged, edited, and instigated work of Frank Pooler. Included are several hundred choral octavos printed singly (S), or in collections (C). The collection also contains articles and other journalistic items by or about the Poolers published in magazines, newspapers, and brochures.

He is co-author of three books, "The New Choral Notation, " "Sound and Symbol," and "Choralography - an Experience in Sound and Movement. " The "Frank Pooler Editions," and the "Frank Pooler Library of Significant Works," feature works by leading composers of the United States, Australia, Scandinavia, and Argentina.

He earned the St. Olav's Medal from the King of Norway in 1984 for distinguished contributions to Norwegian music in the United States. He was a recipient of the Sunni Award in Australia for production on the album, "SCAT!" In 2006, he was an Honoree Award recipient at the American Choral Director Association Western Division convention in Salt Lake City, Utah.

== Books ==
- Pooler, Frank (1971). New Choral Notation. Chapel Hill: Walton Music Corp.
- Pooler, Frank (1975). Choralography: an Experience in Sound and Movement. Chapel Hill: Walton Music Corp.

== Music ==
- Harper’s Creek (for chorus; with Marie Pooler)
- Ride On in Majesty (with Marie Pooler)
