= Now & Then (The Carpenters album) =

Studio album by the Carpenters
- Released: May 1, 1973
- Recorded: December 28, 1972–March 17, 1973
- Studio: A&M (Hollywood)
- Genre: Pop
- Length: 37:46
- Label: A&M
- Producers: Richard Carpenter; Karen Carpenter

The Carpenters chronology
A Song for You (1972)	Now & Then (1973)	The Singles: 1969–1973 (1973)

Singles from Now & Then
- 1. "Sing" Released: January 13, 1973; 2. "Yesterday Once More" Released: May 16, 1973; 3. "Jambalaya (On the Bayou)" Released: 1974

Professional ratings
Review scores
Source	Rating
AllMusic	2.5/5 stars
MusicHound Lounge	1/5 stars
Rolling Stone	(Unfavorable)
The Rolling Stone Album Guide	2/5 stars

Now & Then is the fifth studio album by the American music duo the Carpenters, released on May 1, 1973. The album reached No. 2 on the Billboard Top LPs & Tape chart on July 21, 1973, and ranked No. 20 on the Cash Box year-end pop albums chart. The title, suggested by Karen and Richard's mother Agnes, was taken from a leftover song that did not appear on the album.

== Background ==
As an outgrowth of the Rick Nelson "Garden Party" incident, an oldies revival occurred in pop music by 1973, and Side B of the album, Then, is an oldies medley. The medley starts with the Carpenters' original song "Yesterday Once More". Tony Peluso, the Carpenters' guitarist who made his debut on the 1972 album A Song for You, is heard as a radio DJ throughout the medley, which includes such songs as "The End of the World", "Dead Man's Curve", "Johnny Angel" and "One Fine Day". Peluso would later also be heard as a DJ on the Carpenters' "Calling Occupants of Interplanetary Craft" recording in 1977. The medley also features Mark Rudolph, a cousin of the Carpenters, as the listener who calls in during "Guess the Golden Goodies Group Contest".

Now & Then is one of only two albums for which Karen Carpenter performed all or most of the drumming, the other being Offering (later re-released as Ticket to Ride). She plays all of the drum tracks with the exception of "Jambalaya (On the Bayou)", for which the session drummer Hal Blaine played drums.

The album was released on May 1, 1973, the same day on which the Carpenters performed at the White House following a state dinner for West German chancellor Willy Brandt.

== Singles ==
The album's lead track, "Sing", was written by Sesame Street's frequent composer Joe Raposo. Karen and Richard had first heard the song while on the set of a Robert Young television special. A&M Records did not wish to release it as a single, but Richard insisted, confident it would be a hit. "Sing" reached No. 3 on the Billboard Hot 100 on April 21, 1973.

Richard wrote "Yesterday Once More" after hearing the melody in his head while driving one day. The temporary lyrics for the chorus, which he intended to change later, were kept after the lyricist and former bandmate John Bettis told Richard, "This 'Sha-la-la-wo-wo-wo' stuff sounds pretty good!" The single peaked at No. 2 on July 28, 1973, and became the duo's biggest worldwide hit.

"Yesterday Once More" was issued as a promotional single in the UK in 1973 and "Jambalaya (On the Bayou)" was issued as a promotional single in the UK in 1974.

== Cover ==
The LP album has a three-panel cover, designed by Japanese illustrator Shusei Nagaoka, that folds out, showing a panoramic view of Karen and Richard Carpenter driving past the Carpenter family home on Newville Avenue in Downey, California. Karen and Richard had bought the five-bedroom house for their parents in 1970. Karen collapsed in the upstairs bedroom of the house while suffering the heart attack that ultimately killed her in 1983. The property also contained an annex, now destroyed, that was Richard and Karen's home studio and housed their awards and certification plaques.

In February 2008, fans created a worldwide awareness campaign about the impending demolition of the Carpenter family house that appears on the album cover, which had become a tourist attraction. The home's owners, who had purchased it in 1997 from Richard Carpenter after his mother's death in 1996, were frustrated with fans coming to the house and asking to be shown around, and they wanted to raze it.

The car pictured on the cover is Richard's 1973 Ferrari 365 GTB/4 ("Daytona"). He later sold the car, but bought another of the same type in 1995.

== Critical reception ==
Rolling Stone praised the second side of the album, noting that "side two's the big time here, where America's foremost schmaltzrockers get back to da rootz..."Fun Fun Fun" has got some badass Chuck Berry guitar that really gets on the case. I'll be damned if it didn't blow me right off the stool first time I heard it." The review conceded that "side one ain't quite as exciting, but it's got its moments."

Billboard called it "a unique concept—that of placing a series of new versions of old tunes such as "Johnny Angel" and "Our Day Will Come" in the form of an old DJ radio show with DJ and everything sets this LP far above other LP's. Some radio stations are playing that entire side as a separate "show:" But the flipside is also jammed with hits and Karen Carpenter's charming voice, clear and melodious, virtually turns this LP into a classic...this should be another million-seller for the duo."

In their review, Cashbox stated that "this collection has Karen and Richard vocalizing through the history of rock and roll on the entire second side of the album. To say the least, their renditions of such rock classics of "Da Do Ron Ron", "Johnny Angel" and "Fun, Fun, Fun", among others are letter perfect. The first side includes their current smash single "Sing" as well as other very possible future hits, "I Can't Make Music" and "This Masquerade". Karen and Richard have never sounded better and this album is truly destined for the goldmine."

Bruce Eder of AllMusic was more critical of the album, noting that "it was with the release of Now & Then that the Carpenters lost any pretense of being even dorky cool...whatever the reason, from the moment of the release of Now & Then, listeners under 30 buying a Carpenters album would have good reason to go to a neighborhood where no one knew them to make the purchase, and hide it from their friends."

== Track listing ==
Now
No.	Title	Writer(s)	Length
1.	"Sing"	Joe Raposo	3:20
2.	"This Masquerade"	Leon Russell	4:50
3.	"Heather"	Johnny Pearson	2:47
4.	"Jambalaya (On the Bayou)"	Hank Williams	3:40
5.	"I Can't Make Music"	Randy Edelman	3:17

Then
No.	Title	Writer(s)	Length
6.	"Yesterday Once More" (3:50): Medley (Note: The medley lengths are sourced from the CD, where all parts are individual tracks.); a. "Fun, Fun, Fun" (1:32) b. "The End of the World" (2:25) c. "Da Doo Ron Ron (When He Walked Me Home)" (1:43) d. "Dead Man's Curve" (1:40) e. "Johnny Angel" (1:30) f. "The Night Has a Thousand Eyes" (1:45) g. "Our Day Will Come" (2:00) h. "One Fine Day" (1:40)	John Bettis, Richard Carpenter: a. Brian Wilson, Mike Love; b. Arthur Kent, Sylvia Dee; c. Ellie Greenwich, Jeff Barry, Phil Spector; d. Jan Berry, Roger Christian, Wilson, Artie Kornfeld; e. Lyn Duddy, Lee Pockriss; f. Benjamin Weisman, Dorothy Wayne, Marilynn Garrett; g. Bob Hilliard, Mort Garson; h. Carole King, Gerry Goffin	18:05
7.	"Yesterday Once More (reprise)"	Bettis, Carpenter	0:58

== Personnel ==
- Richard Carpenter – keyboards, lead and backing vocals, arranger, orchestration, producer
- Karen Carpenter – drums (except on "Jambalaya"), lead and backing vocals, producer
- Hal Blaine – drums on "Jambalaya"
- Joe Osborn – bass guitar
- Bob Messenger – flute, tenor saxophone
- Doug Strawn – baritone saxophone
- Tom Scott – recorder
- Tony Peluso – lead and rhythm guitars, spoken word (DJ) on "Yesterday Once More" medley
- Gary Sims – rhythm guitar
- Buddy Emmons – steel guitar
- Jay Dee Maness – steel guitar
- Earl Dumler – oboe, bass oboe, English horn
- Gayle Levant – harp
- The Jimmy Joyce Children's Chorus – backing vocals on "Sing"

Technical

- Ray Gerhardt – engineer
- Roger Young – assistant engineer
- Bernie Grundman – mastering engineer
- Roland Young – art direction
- Jim McCrary – photography (front cover)
- Design Maru – illustrations (front cover)
- Shusei Nagaoka – illustrator (3-panel front cover)
- Len Freas – illustrations (inside cover)
- Bernie Grundman, Richard Carpenter – remastering at Bernie Grundman Mastering

== Charts ==
=== Weekly charts ===
Chart (1973–1975)	Position
Australian Albums (Kent Music Report)	3
Canada Top Albums/CDs (RPM)	2
Dutch Albums (Album Top 100)	2
Finnish Albums (The Official Finnish Charts)	9
Japanese Albums (Oricon	1
Norwegian Albums (VG-lista)	12
UK Albums (Official Charts)	2
US Billboard 200	2
US Cash Box Top 200 Albums	1

=== Year-end charts ===
Chart (1973)	Position
Australian Albums (Kent Music Report	12
Dutch Albums (Album Top 100)	19
Japanese Albums (Oricon	5
UK Albums (OCC)	12
US Billboard 200	51

Chart (1974)	Position
Dutch Albums (Album Top 100)	26
Japanese Albums (Oricon	4
UK Albums (OCC)	25

=== Decade-end charts ===
Chart (1970s)	Position
Japanese Albums Chart	25

== Certifications ==
Region	Certification	Certified units/sales
Japan (Oricon Charts)	—	514,000
Netherlands (NVPI)	Platinum	100,000^{^}
United Kingdom (BPI)	Gold	100,000^{^}
United States (RIAA)	2× Platinum	2,000,000^{^}
^{^} Shipments figures based on certification alone.
