= Bless the Beasts and Children (song) =

- Back side of "Superstar" U.S. single picture sleeve

Single by Carpenters

from the album Bless the Beasts and Children and A Song for You
- A-side: "Superstar"
- Released: August 12, 1971
- Recorded: April 16, 1971
- Studio: A&M (Hollywood, California)
- Genre: Pop
- Length: 3:09
- Label: A&M
- Songwriters: Barry De Vorzon; Perry Botkin, Jr.
- Producer: Jack Daugherty

Carpenters singles chronology
"Superstar" (1971)	"Bless the Beasts and Children" (1971)	"Hurting Each Other" (1971)

"Bless the Beasts and Children" is the theme song to the 1971 film Bless the Beasts and Children performed by the Carpenters.

== Composition ==
Barry De Vorzon composed the song at a residence in Lake Arrowhead, California, where he used to spend his weekends, after director Stanley Kramer gave him the screenplay of the film. At first he wrote a "beautiful melody" and then "loaded the lyric with all the terrible things we're doing to children and animals", but it "did not work". The next day he changed them to simpler lyrics that call to protect their innocence.

== Versions differences ==
The original soundtrack included two different versions of "Bless the Beasts and Children", the one by Carpenters and the other being an orchestral instrumental arrangement by composers Barry DeVorzon and Perry Botkin, Jr.

A slightly different version of the song was released on the Carpenters' 1972 LP, A Song for You on June 13, 1972. The original soundtrack had a vibraphone playing the melody in the introduction, while the A Song for You version, also released as a single, contained an oboe stating the melody. Richard Carpenter re-mixed the song for the inclusion on the 1985 compilation Yesterday Once More. Unlike the original, this version does not fade out in the end and also features a harder bass-line.

== Release and reception ==
The song was featured on the B-side to the Carpenters single "Superstar". Billboard magazine listed the single as “Superstar/ Bless the Beasts and Children” on the Hot 100 after the song gained significant airplay, charting first at number 16 for the week of 11/20/71, and then number 21 for the week of 11/27/71.

Then "Bless The Beasts and Children" had its own run as an A-side charting on the Billboard Hot 100, eventually topping out at number 67.

In order to promote it, the Carpenters performed it on their television series, Make Your Own Kind of Music.

"Bless The Beasts and Children" was nominated for a 1972 Academy Award for Best Song, but it lost to Isaac Hayes's "Theme from Shaft".

== Personnel ==
- Karen Carpenter – lead and backing vocals
- Richard Carpenter – backing vocals, piano, Hammond organ, Wurlitzer electric piano, orchestration
- Joe Osborn – bass guitar
- Hal Blaine – drums
- Tony Peluso – electric fuzz guitar
- Earl Dumler – oboe, English horn
- Uncredited – vibraphone, tambourine, temple blocks

== Chart history ==
Chart performance for "Bless the Beasts and Children" by the Carpenters
Chart (1971–1972)	Peak position
Canada RPM Adult Contemporary	25
Oricon (Japanese) Singles Chart	85
US Billboard Hot 100 as a B-Side	2
US Billboard Hot 100 as an A-Side	67
US Billboard Adult Contemporary	26

Chart performance for "Bless the Beasts and Children" by Botkin and DeVorzon
Chart (1977)	Peak position
Canada RPM Adult Contemporary	17
