= (They Long to Be) Close to You =

1970 single by the Carpenters

- Side A of the Irish single

Single by the Carpenters

from the album Close to You
- B-side: "I Kept on Lovin' You"
- Released: May 14, 1970
- Genre: Easy listening; soft pop
- Length: 4:33 (LP); 3:40 (single)
- Label: A&M
- Songwriters: Burt Bacharach; Hal David
- Producer: Jack Daugherty

The Carpenters singles chronology
"Ticket to Ride" (1969)	"(They Long to Be) Close to You" (1970)	"We've Only Just Begun" (1970)

Official audio
- "(They Long To Be) Close To You" on YouTube

"(They Long to Be) Close to You" is a song written by Burt Bacharach and Hal David. First recorded in 1963 by Richard Chamberlain, the song had its biggest success in 1970, in a version recorded by American duo the Carpenters for their second studio album Close to You and produced by Jack Daugherty. A soft pop ballad, the song expresses a woman's appreciation that her romantic partner symbolically attracts the attention of birds and falling stars.

Released on May 14, 1970, the single of the Carpenters' version topped both the Billboard Hot 100 and Adult Contemporary charts and ranked no. 2 in the Billboard Year-End Hot 100 of 1970. Billboard, Cash Box, and Record World all offered positive reviews. It was also popular internationally, reaching the top of the Canadian and Australian charts and peaked at number six on the charts of both the UK and Ireland. The record was certified gold by the Recording Industry Association of America (RIAA) in August 1970. Johnny Mathis and Andy Williams also recorded their own versions of "Close to You" later that year.

In 1986, American R&B singer Gwen Guthrie recorded a cover of the song that reached no. 25 on the UK Singles Chart and no. 9 on the Recorded Music NZ chart. In later years, the Carpenters' version continued to attract interest, as a plot device in the 1989 film Parenthood and 2007 film The Simpsons Movie along with a 1991 episode of The Simpsons. The New York Times also wrote articles complimenting the song in 1995 and 2014.

== Composition ==
With lyrics by Hal David and music by Burt Bacharach, "(They Long to Be) Close to You" is in the key of C major, with a 4/4 time signature. The lyrics are written from the perspective of a woman asking why birds, stars from the sky, and other women "long to be close to" her romantic partner.

== Carpenters version ==
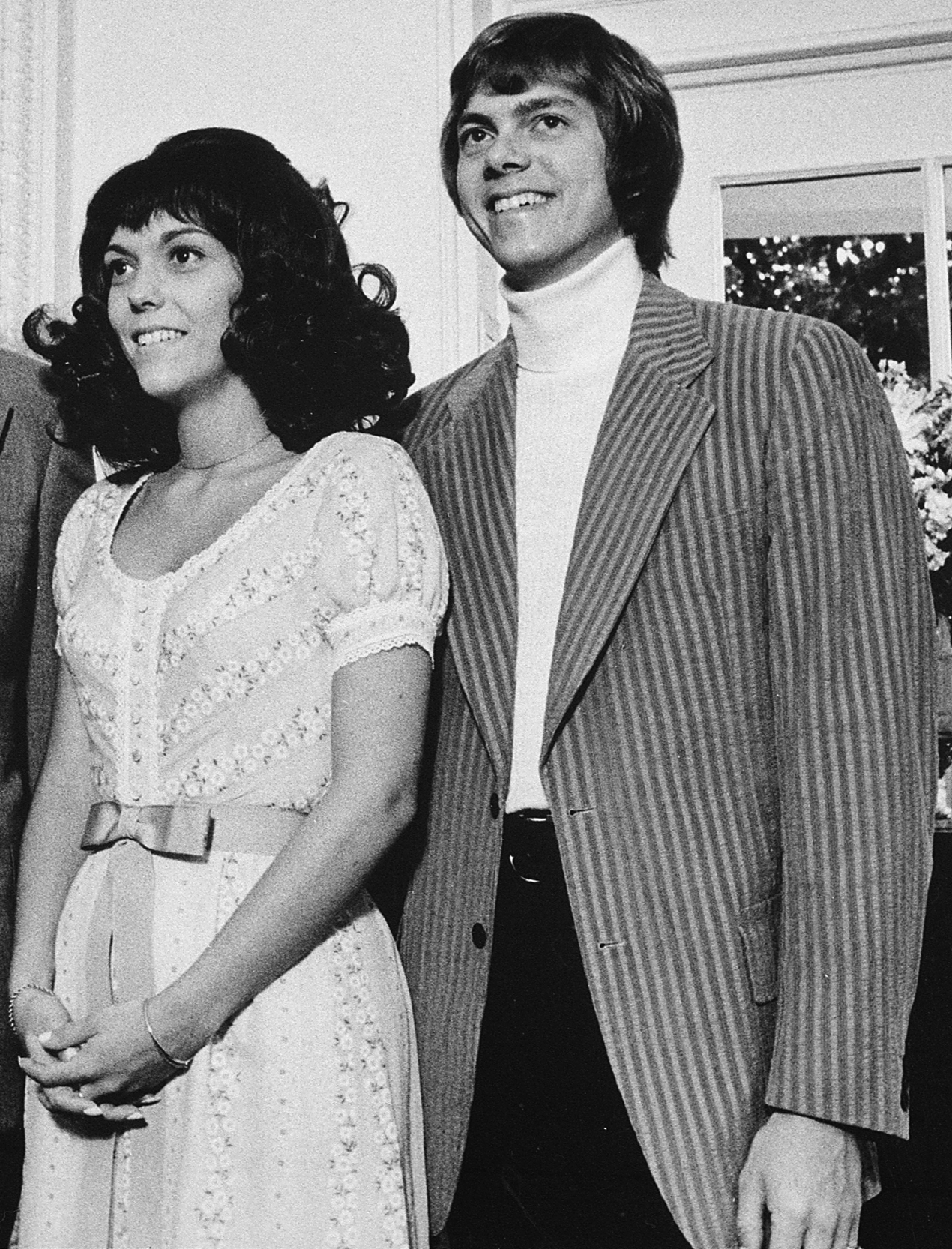
Karen and Richard Carpenter recorded the most successful version of the song.

In 1970, "(They Long to Be) Close to You" was released by the Carpenters on their album Close to You (1970) and became their breakthrough hit. Believing the original title to be too long, Richard Carpenter added parentheses around "They Long to Be". Los Angeles station KHJ was the first U.S. radio station to play "Close to You", reported Record World on June 6, 1970. The song charted on the Billboard Hot 100 for 17 weeks, including four consecutive weeks at number one during July and August, becoming Carpenters' first top 10. It was also no. 2 in the Billboard Year-End Hot 100 singles of 1970. In 2018, Billboard ranked "Close to You" the top single of the summer of 1970. Additionally, the success of "Close to You" helped A&M Records set a new record for singles sales in 1970.

Bacharach and David gave Herb Alpert the song after he scored a number one hit in 1968 with "This Guy's in Love with You", which the duo had also written. Alpert recorded the song, but he was displeased with the recording and did not release it. After the Carpenters achieved their first entry on the Billboard Hot 100 chart with "Ticket to Ride" in 1969, Alpert approached them to record their version of the song, believing it was well-suited for them.

"(They Long to Be) Close to You" earned the Carpenters a Grammy Award for Best Contemporary Performance by a Duo, Group or Chorus in 1971. It became the first of three Grammy Awards they would win during their careers. The song was certified gold by the Recording Industry Association of America (RIAA) on August 12, 1970. Reaching number six on the UK Singles Chart in 1970, in a UK television special on ITV in 2016 it was voted fourth in "The Nation's Favourite Carpenters Song".

=== Arrangement ===
Instrumental backing was provided by L.A. studio musicians from the Wrecking Crew. Richard had originally written the flugelhorn solo part for Herb Alpert but when he was unavailable at the time of recording, Chuck Findley was hired in his stead. Richard later commented: "Chuck didn't play it that way at first, but I worked with him and he nailed it. A lot of people thought it was Herb – Bacharach thought so, too. But it's the way Findley is playing it."

The arrangement was completely different from the version Bacharach cut with Richard Chamberlain, with one exception. When Richard Carpenter asked Bacharach for permission (as a courtesy) to redo the song, Bacharach requested that he keep the two "quintuplets" (five note groupings) (piano ornaments) at the end of the first bridge. Bacharach recalled his initial reaction on hearing the finished product: "Man, this is just great! I completely blew it with Richard Chamberlain but now someone else has come along and made a record so much better than mine."

=== Reception ===
Billboard highlighted "Close to You" in its "Spotlight Singles" section on May 30, 1970, commenting: "Performance is exceptional." The same day's edition of Record World also praised the song, rating it four out of four stars. Cash Box followed up naming "Close to You" among its "Picks of the Week" for June 13, 1970, calling the song "delightful" and asking: "Are Bacharach/David songs female vehicles, or do they just sound better in a feline framework?"

In a 1995 New York Times Magazine story about love songs released in summers, Stephan Talty described "Close to You" as a "hushed love song" that "[set] the tone for a generation's soft ballads" in 1970.

In 2014, Rob Hoerburger of The New York Times observed that the song "highlights both Karen's aching alto and Richard's deft piano playing and elegant Satie-like arrangement."

=== Use in other media ===
The song plays a key part throughout the animated television show The Simpsons, being used prominently during moments between Homer and Marge Simpson over the course of the series. It is first used in the second season episode "The Way We Was", a flashback episode detailing how the couple met; Homer is first shown listening to the song in the car, and it later plays when he sees Marge for the first time in high school detention, and throughout the rest of the episode. It is also the tune of the doorbell that won't stop in the episode "Maximum Homerdrive". It later features in The Simpsons Movie (2007), as Homer tearfully watches a videotape left behind by Marge in Alaska containing the couple's first dance to the song, and subsequently collapses onto a broken heart-shaped iceberg in anguish.

The song is also featured in the 1989 film Parenthood sung by Nathan Huffner (Rick Moranis) in a scene at his wife's classroom.

=== Personnel ===
- Karen Carpenter – lead and backing vocals
- Richard Carpenter – backing vocals, piano, Wurlitzer electronic piano, harpsichord, orchestration
- Joe Osborn – bass
- Hal Blaine – drums
- Chuck Findley – trumpet
- Bob Messenger – flute
- uncredited – vibraphone

=== Chart performance ===
==== Weekly charts ====
Chart (1970)	Peak position
Australia Go-Set Chart	1
Canada RPM Top Singles	1
Ireland (IRMA)	6
Netherlands (Dutch Top 40)	33
Netherlands (Single Top 100)	30
New Zealand (Listener)	9
Quebec (ADISQ)	3
UK Singles (Official Charts)	6
US Billboard Hot 100	1
US Adult Contemporary (Billboard)	1
US Cash Box Top 100	1
US Cashbox Radio Active Airplay Singles	1
US Record World	1

==== Year-end charts ====
Chart (1970)	Rank
Australia	2
Canada	9
U.S. Billboard Hot 100	2
U.S. Cash Box	16

=== Certifications ===
Region	Certification	Certified units/sales
Australia (ARIA)	Gold	35,000^{^}
United Kingdom (BPI)	Gold	400,000^{‡}
United States (RIAA)	Gold	1,000,000^{^}
^{^} Shipments figures based on certification alone.^{‡} Sales+streaming figures based on certification alone.

== Gwen Guthrie version ==
"(They Long to Be) Close to You"

Single by Gwen Guthrie

from the album Good to Go Lover
- Released: September 13, 1986
- Genre: R&B
- Length: 5:33
- Label: Polydor
- Songwriters: Burt Bacharach, Hal David
- Producers: Gwen Guthrie, David Conley, Jerome Gasper

Gwen Guthrie singles chronology
"Good to Go Lover" (1986)	"(They Long to Be) Close to You" (1986)	"Friends & Lovers" (1987)

In 1986, Gwen Guthrie released her version of the song, which could only partially build on the success of her hit "Ain't Nothin' Goin' On but the Rent". Compared to the original, this version is synthesizer-heavy and is adapted to the time.

=== Music video ===
In the music video, Gwen Guthrie sings the song on a stage while the crowd dances and papparazi crowd the stage.

=== Track listing ===
12" maxi

1. "(They Long to Be) Close to You" - 7:14
2. "You Touched My Life" - 5:07
3. "Save Your Love for Me" - 4:50

=== Charts ===
Chart (1986–1987)	Peak position
UK Singles (OCC)	25
New Zealand (Recorded Music NZ)	9
Ireland (IRMA)	19
US Hot R&B/Hip-Hop Songs (Billboard)	69

== Other versions ==
The song was first recorded by Richard Chamberlain and released as a single in 1963 as "They Long to Be Close to You" (without parentheses). However, while the single's other side, "Blue Guitar", became a hit, "They Long to Be Close to You" did not. The tune was also recorded as a demo by Dionne Warwick in 1963, was re-recorded with a Burt Bacharach arrangement for her album Make Way for Dionne Warwick (1964), and was released as the B-side of her 1965 single "Here I Am". Dusty Springfield recorded the song in August 1964, but her version was not released commercially until it appeared on her album Where Am I Going? (1967).

In 1970, Johnny Mathis recorded a version for his album Close to You. Also that year, Andy Williams recorded the song for his album The Andy Williams Show, not related to his television variety show of the same name. Bacharach released his own version in 1971. Bobby Womack also covered this song in 1971. "Monologue / (They Long To Be) Close To You' was released in 1971 on his Communication album. The monologue on the intro of this song is Bobby's expression of frustration with the music industry.

A cover of the song was recorded by the Cranberries for the 1994 Carpenters tribute album "If I Were A Carpenter"

In 2024, Lady Gaga included her rendition of the song on Harlequin, a companion album to the film Joker: Folie à Deux, released on September 27, 2024.

In 2025, Kanye West sampled Stevie Wonder's talkbox rendition of "Close to You" for his song "White Lines" on his album Bully. The released version of "White Lines" in 2026 instead features André Troutman performing a talkbox interpolation of the song.
