= Jack Daugherty (musician) =

American musician and music producer (1930–1991)

- Born: August 13, 1930; Cincinnati, Ohio, United States
- Died: February 2, 1991 (aged 60) Carmel, California, United States
- Genres: Pop music, soft rock
- Occupations: Musician, music producer
- Instruments: Trumpet, piano
- Label: A&M Records

Jack Daugherty (August 13, 1930 – February 2, 1991) was an American musician, trumpeter and producer who is best known for being the music producer of the band the Carpenters.

== Early life and career ==
Daugherty was born in Cincinnati, Ohio. For most of his early professional career, Daugherty had worked as a trumpeter in Woody Herman's band. Among his other early work was a lead sheet writer in Hollywood, and an arranger for Paul Masse at Liberty Records.

By the 1960s, Daugherty had all but retired from the music business, working in public relations at North American Aviation, an aircraft company with a location operating in the Los Angeles area. Though by this time no longer actively involved in music, Daugherty still kept an open network with other performers throughout the years.

== The Carpenters ==
One performer in Daugherty's network was John Pisano, guitarist of Herb Alpert's band The Tijuana Brass, and still a part of the A&M Records roster. Daugherty is credited with getting a demo tape of Karen and Richard Carpenter's work to Herb Alpert through Pisano. The connection landed the Carpenters a recording contract, and Daugherty himself gained a personal production contract with the label. Daugherty had his own secretary at A&M and was paid a $25,000 salary (US$192,422 in 2025 dollars)

As Daugherty had brought the duo to the label, he was assigned production duties of their work. The extent of his involvement in their work has been debated for years.

Daugherty's first credited work with the Carpenters was shortly after their signing in 1969 with the release of Offering, lasting until 1972, with the release of A Song for You. These early recordings carry the credits "Produced by Jack Daugherty" or "Jack Daugherty Productions".

Initially, Richard Carpenter did not mind the credit, though his was the creative mind that produced the records and did the arrangements, while Daugherty's contributions were limited to booking musicians and studio time and finding potential songs, with limited production advice. During his time as a credited producer for the duo, Daugherty produced his own debut album for A&M: Jack Daugherty and the Class of Nineteen Hundred and Seventy One, a jazz-oriented instrumental album with more than 30 musicians contributing, including Larry Carlton, Jeff Porcaro, Joe Osborn, Chuck Finley and Hal Blaine. The duo-fold album was laid out like a scholastic yearbook with a gold faux embossed cover.

While grateful for his contribution to their landing a record contract, the Carpenters viewed Daugherty as simply an A&R man, and not a creative producer, despite Richard crediting him as such in their Grammy Award acceptance speech for "Close to You". While Richard had been passive about Daugherty's production credit on their early work, he became outraged when a Cashbox magazine review praised Daugherty's production abilities. According to Roger Nichols, Richard felt that he was producing the records and Daugherty put his name on them.

== Dismissal and lawsuit against A&M ==
In addition to his salary and assistant, Daugherty also received royalties from the Carpenters' records, which generated more friction between Daugherty and the Carpenters. Richard Carpenter demanded and received a meeting with Alpert and his partner, Jerry Moss. Expecting to have his complaints dismissed, Carpenter was surprised to discover that Alpert and Moss shared his concerns, mostly over Daugherty not producing any non-Carpenters work for A&M other than his own. Days later, Alpert and Moss met again with Richard Carpenter over lunch telling him that Daugherty had been released from the label. Daugherty's departure was made evident with the 1973 release of Now & Then, the first album to not carry Daugherty's name as a production credit.

The music industry press picked up on this omission, and Richard Carpenter was asked at a UK press conference what specific role Daugherty played in the duo's sound. He responded, "Nothing. That's why he's no longer with us. We produced all these singles. It's a long story, but Jack had nothing to do with anything. He was responsible for getting Herb Alpert to hear our tape, which was very nice, but he wasn't our producer. You'll notice he hasn't had one record on any chart since he left us."

After Daugherty was fired from A&M, he sued Herb Alpert and Jerry Moss for wrongful termination, further claiming that his termination undermined his credibility in the music industry. Nonetheless, while the suit was still working its way through the legal system, Daugherty released another jazz album, Carmel by the Sea (credited as The Jack Daugherty Orchestra) on the Monterey record label in 1976. Ironically, this album was mastered at A&M records.

Daugherty lost the 9-year lawsuit after the courts ruled in favor of both A&M and the Carpenters, but the defense cost the record label between $350,000 (US$1,239,477 in 2025 dollars) and $400,000 (US$1,416,545 in 2025 dollars).

== Late career and death ==
Despite the damaged relationship, Daugherty later set aside his differences with the band and attended the funeral of Karen Carpenter in 1983, a gesture that Richard Carpenter found moving.

Daugherty released another album, a collection of jazz and show tunes called Romance on the Portazul label in 1990. It was his last work.

Jack Daugherty died on February 2, 1991, of complications during coronary bypass surgery. He was survived by a son, Michael.

== Bibliography ==
- Coleman, Ray. The Carpenters: The Untold Story. HarperCollins, New York, 1994. ISBN 978-0-06-018345-5
