= Goodbye to Love =

- Original US single cover

Single by Carpenters

from the album A Song for You
- B-side: "Crystal Lullaby"
- Released: June 19, 1972
- Recorded: 1972
- Studio: A&M (Hollywood, California)
- Genre: Soft rock
- Length: 3:58
- Label: A&M
- Songwriters: Richard Carpenter; John Bettis
- Producer: Jack Daugherty

Carpenters singles chronology
"It's Going to Take Some Time" (1972)	"Goodbye to Love" (1972)	"Sing" (1973)

Official audio
- "Goodbye To Love" on YouTube

"Goodbye to Love" is a song composed by Richard Carpenter and John Bettis. It was released by the Carpenters in 1972. On the Close to You: Remembering The Carpenters documentary, guest guitarist Tony Peluso stated that this was one of the first power ballads, if not the first, to have a fuzz guitar solo. "Goodbye to Love" was the first Carpenters hit written by Richard Carpenter and John Bettis.

== Background ==
While visiting London, Richard Carpenter watched a 1940 Bing Crosby film called Rhythm on the River. The Carpenters noticed that the characters kept referring to the struggling songwriter's greatest composition, "Goodbye to Love". Carpenter said, "You never hear it in the movie, they just keep referring to it", and he thought it was a good title for a song. He immediately envisioned the tune and lyrics, starting with:

I'll say goodbye to love.
No one ever cared if I should live or die.
Time and time again, the chance for
Love has passed me by...

He said that while the melody in his head kept going, the lyrics stopped "because I'm not a lyricist". He completed the rest of his arrangement upon his return to the United States, while his writing partner John Bettis completed the rest of the lyrics.

While the Carpenters were working on the song, they decided that a fuzz guitar solo should be included. Karen Carpenter called guitarist Tony Peluso and asked him to play on the record. Peluso remembers: "At first I didn't believe that it was actually Karen Carpenter on the phone but she repeated her name again. ... It was at this point that I realized it was really her and that I was speaking to one of my idols." She told him that she and Richard were working on a song called "Goodbye to Love", that they were familiar with Tony's work with a band called Instant Joy, and that he would be perfect for the sound they were looking for. Peluso first played something soft and sweet, but then Richard Carpenter said: "No, no, no! Play the melody for five bars and then burn it up! Soar off into the stratosphere! Go ahead! It'll be great!"

John Bettis has said that Richard Carpenter kept calling him, raving about the guitar solo. He was wondering why Richard was going on about the solo until he heard it. The lyricist said he cried when he first heard the song because he had never heard an electric guitar sound like that. He said Tony Peluso "had a certain almost cello sounding guitar growl that worked against the wonderful melancholia of that song". He went on to say the "way it growls at you, especially at the end" was unbelievable.

== Release and reception ==
The finished product was released on June 19, 1972, and reached No. 7 on the Billboard Hot 100. It also became Carpenters' seventh top-ten single in the Billboard Hot 100. It was the first song written by the songwriting team of Carpenter/Bettis to reach the US top ten. The Carpenters received hate mail (claiming that the Carpenters had sold out and gone hard rock) because of Richard's idea for a fuzz guitar solo in a love ballad.

"Goodbye to Love" has been described as the prototypical power ballad. Cash Box said that the "funky guitar adds spice to the most notable Jack Dougherty [sic] production."

In the UK, the song was originally released in 1972 as the B-side to "I Won't Last a Day Without You". The sides were switched shortly after the record's release, and it reached No. 9 on the UK Singles Chart, becoming the duo's second top ten hit there (the first being "(They Long to Be) Close to You").

== Covers ==
In 2022, American singer-songwriter Phoebe Bridgers performed a cover from the soundtrack of the animated film Minions: The Rise of Gru.

2026 saw Doublespeak, an electronic supergroup project with Neil Arthur of Blancmange on lead vocal, cover the song.

== Chart performance ==
=== Weekly charts ===
Chart (1972)	Peak position
Canada RPM Top Singles	4
Australia (Kent Music Report)	25
Canada RPM Adult Contemporary	1
Ireland (IRMA)	12
Oricon (Japanese) Singles Chart	55
New Zealand (Listener)	5
Quebec (ADISQ)	35
UK Singles (OCC)	9
US Billboard Hot 100	7
US Adult Contemporary (Billboard)	2
US Cashbox Radio Active Airplay Singles	2
U.S. Record World	6
US Cash Box Top 100	7

=== Year-end charts ===
Chart (1972)	Rank
Canada RPM Top Singles	92
UK	78
U.S. Cash Box	72
U.S. (Joel Whitburn's Pop Annual)	74

== Personnel ==
- Karen Carpenter – lead and backing vocals
- Richard Carpenter – backing vocals, piano, Hammond organ, Wurlitzer electronic piano, orchestration
- Joe Osborn – bass guitar
- Hal Blaine – drums
- Tony Peluso – electric fuzz guitar
- Earl Dumler – oboe
