= Top of the World (The Carpenters song) =

1972 song written and composed by Richard Carpenter and John Bettis

- Artwork for U.S. vinyl single

Single by Carpenters

from the album A Song for You
- B-side: (United States) "Heather" (United Kingdom) "Your Wonderful Parade"
- Released: September 17, 1973
- Recorded: March 1, 1972 (album version) August 15, 1973 (single version)
- Studio: A&M Studios
- Genre: Soft rock; pop; country folk
- Length: 2:56
- Label: A&M; 1468
- Songwriters: Richard Carpenter, John Bettis
- Producers: Richard Carpenter, Karen Carpenter, Jack Daugherty

Carpenters singles chronology
"Yesterday Once More" (1973)	"Top of the World" (1973)	"Jambalaya (On the Bayou)" (1974)

"Top of the World" is a 1972 song written and composed by Richard Carpenter and John Bettis and first recorded by American pop duo Carpenters. It was a Billboard Hot 100 No. 1 hit for the duo for two consecutive weeks in 1973. It also became Carpenters' second number one and tenth top-ten single on the Billboard Hot 100.

Carpenters originally intended the song to be only an album cut. However, after country singer Lynn Anderson covered the song and it became a number two hit on the country charts, they reconsidered.

== The Carpenters version ==
=== Background ===
Written by Richard Carpenter (music) and John Bettis (lyrics), "Top of the World" was originally recorded for and released on the duo's 1972 studio album A Song for You. The song was initially intended to just remain an album cut, however, when Lynn Anderson's version, released in mid-1973, was a success, the duo was upset that they hadn't released their version as a single to begin with. The Carpenters' version was later released as a single on September 17, 1973. Karen Carpenter re-recorded her lead vocal for the single release as she was not quite satisfied with the original. The new version appeared on the duo's first compilation album, The Singles: 1969-1973.

Following its single release, the song topped the Billboard Hot 100 chart in late 1973, becoming the duo's second of three No. 1 singles, following "(They Long to Be) Close to You" and preceding "Please Mr. Postman".

In Japan, it was used as the opening theme song for the 1995 Japanese drama Miseinen. In 2003, another drama, Beginner, had it as its ending theme song. It is heard in Shrek Forever After as Shrek enjoys being a "real ogre" and terrifying the villagers, as well as in a prominent scene of the 2012 film Dark Shadows, where a performance by the Carpenters is seen on a television screen. It was also used as the opening song of the Season 2, Episode 1 of Netflix series After Life. In his Oscars acceptance speech for Best Original Song "Naatu Naatu", composer M.M. Keeravani mentioned the Carpenters and briefly interpolated his thanks to the tune of "Top of the World".

Cash Box praised Karen Carpenter's "strong lead vocal" and the pair's vocal harmonies.

=== Personnel ===
- Karen Carpenter – lead and backing vocals
- Richard Carpenter – backing vocals, Wurlitzer electronic piano, orchestration
- Joe Osborn – bass guitar
- Hal Blaine – drums
- Tony Peluso – electric guitar
- Buddy Emmons – pedal steel guitar
- Uncredited – tambourine

=== Charts ===
==== Weekly charts ====
Chart (1973–1974)	Peak position
Australia	1
Canadian RPM Top Singles	1
Canada RPM Adult Contemporary	2
Dutch Mega Single Top 100	12
German Media Control Charts	38
Ireland (IRMA)	3
Japanese Oricon Singles	21
New Zealand (Listener)	14
Quebec (ADISQ)	style="text-align:center;"1
UK Singles (OCC)	5
Belgium Ultratop Flanders	27
US Billboard Hot 100	1
US Billboard Easy Listening	2
US Cash Box Radio Active Airplay Singles	2
US Record World	3
US Cash Box Top 100	style="text-align:center;"1

==== Year-end charts ====
Chart (1973)	Position
Canada	18

==== All-time charts ====
Chart (1958-2018)	Position
US Billboard Hot 100	371

=== Certifications ===
Region	Certification	Certified units/sales
Japan (RIAJ) Digital	Platinum	250,000^{*}
Japan (RIAJ) Full-length ringtone	Gold	100,000^{*}
United Kingdom (BPI)	Silver	250,000^{^}
United States (RIAA)	Gold	1,000,000^{^}
^{*} Sales figures based on certification alone.^{^} Shipments figures based on certification alone.

== Lynn Anderson version ==
"Top of the World"
- Side label of U.S. vinyl single

Single by Lynn Anderson

from the album Top of the World
- B-side: "I Wish I Was a Little Boy Again"
- Released: June 1973
- Recorded: 1973
- Genre: Country pop
- Length: 2:55
- Label: Columbia
- Songwriters: Richard Carpenter, John Bettis
- Producers: Glenn Sutton, Clive Davis

Lynn Anderson singles chronology
"Keep Me in Mind" (1973)	"Top of the World" (1973)	"Sing About Love" (1973)

=== Background ===
Country music singer Lynn Anderson covered the song in 1973 for her eighteenth studio album Top of the World, released on Columbia Records. It was the first single released from the album and her version became the first hit. Anderson's cover reached No. 2 on the US country singles chart and No. 74 on the Billboard Hot 100 in mid-1973. The success of Anderson's version prompted the Carpenters to release a new version as a single, where it topped the US pop singles chart for two weeks in December 1973. Anderson's recording was produced by her then husband Glenn Sutton and Clive Davis. She later re-recorded the song for her 2004 album, The Bluegrass Sessions.

=== Charts ===
Chart (1973)	Peak position
US Billboard Hot 100	74
US Billboard Hot Country Singles	2
US Billboard Easy Listening	34
Canadian RPM Country Tracks	1
Canadian RPM Adult Contemporary	30

== Other versions ==
- In early 1973, New Zealand singer Steve Allen took his version to No. 1 in New Zealand for a week, sharing the top with the Carpenters version.
- In 1974, the Swedish dansband Vikingarna had a Svensktoppen hit with a Swedish version by Benny Borg, "På världens tak (On the Roof of the World)", which was the first Vikingarna song to chart on the Svensktoppen.
- The Ray Conniff Singers covered the song on several albums.
- A Hebrew-language version of the song performed by Ruthi Navon was included on the soundtrack for the Israeli children's television program Cabbage Head (Hebrew: ראש כרוב)
- The Demo Disk for the Creative Labs Music System Sound Card contains a rendition of the song, released in 1987 for IBM PC Compatibles.
- A version by Japanese alternative rock band Shonen Knife appeared on the 1994 Carpenters tribute album If I Were a Carpenter, and plays during the closing credits of the 1995 film The Last Supper. It is also used in the 1998 film The Parent Trap during the cafeteria scene at the girls' camp, during a montage in the 2000 film The Broken Hearts Club: A Romantic Comedy, and in a date scene between Sean and Neela in the 2006 film The Fast and the Furious: Tokyo Drift.

== See also ==
- List of Hot 100 number-one singles of 1973 (U.S.)
