= Tony Peluso =

- Born: Anthony F. Peluso; March 28, 1950; Los Angeles, California, U.S.
- Died: June 5, 2010 (aged 60) Los Angeles, California, U.S.
- Occupations: Guitarist; record producer; vocalist
- Formerly of: The Carpenters, The Abstracts

Anthony F. Peluso (March 28, 1950 – June 5, 2010) was an American guitarist and record producer. He was lead guitarist for pop duo The Carpenters from 1972 to 1983.

Peluso played the fuzz guitar solo on the Carpenters' song "Goodbye to Love". He also contributed a disc jockey impersonation that opens the duo's cover of "Calling Occupants of Interplanetary Craft" and was the deejay who links the medley of oldies tracks on Side 2 of the Carpenters album Now & Then.

== Career ==
Peluso came from a musical family, his mother being a successful opera singer and his father being the music director for NBC radio on the west coast. His mother was Emily Hardy (1908–1983), a soprano who performed most notably with The San Francisco Opera Company (debut 1933, Musetta, La Bohème) and the Metropolitan Opera (debut 1936, Gilda, Rigoletto). Tony's father was Thomas A. Peluso, composer and conductor (1899–1963).

He began his own musical career in 1968, when he formed a band called The Abstracts with three college friends. The band recorded one album for the small Pompeii label, on which he sang, played guitar and wrote most of the songs. However, the album was not a commercial success, mainly due to poor distribution, and the group disbanded shortly after its release

Peluso later played alongside Bobby Sherman and Paul Revere & the Raiders as well as leading the backing band Instant Joy for Mark Lindsay when Lindsay took a break from Paul Revere & the Raiders.

=== The Carpenters ===
In 1972 Richard Carpenter and John Bettis had written a new song, "Goodbye to Love", for the Carpenters. While the Carpenters were working on the song, Richard decided that there should be a fuzz guitar solo on it. He recalled Tony Peluso from a time when Mark Lindsay and Instant Joy opened for the Carpenters. Karen Carpenter called Tony Peluso and asked him to play a guitar solo. On the DVD Close to You: Remembering The Carpenters Peluso recalled: "At first I didn't believe that it was actually Karen Carpenter on the phone but she repeated her name again. ...It was at this point that I realized it was really her and that I was speaking to one of my idols." She told him that she and Richard were working on a song called "Goodbye to Love" and they were both familiar with his work with another band, and that he'd be perfect for the sound they were looking for. In the studio, Peluso first played something soft and sweet, but then Richard said "No, no, no! Play the melody for five bars and then burn it up! Soar off into the stratosphere! Go ahead! It'll be great!" The solo was played from the electric guitar through a fuzz box straight into the mixing console onto the tape.

Peluso subsequently joined the Carpenters recording and touring band as lead guitarist.

=== Later career ===
Following the death of Karen Carpenter on February 4, 1983, Peluso moved on to record producing. He worked for the next decade at Motown Records, where he recorded artists such as Smokey Robinson, The Temptations, the Four Tops and Michael Jackson.

Peluso went on to produce and/or engineer for artists such as Kenny Loggins, Seals and Crofts, Apollonia Kotero, Player, Animotion, Stephanie Mills, The Triplets, Bloc, The Fixx, New Monkees, Dave Koz and Boyz II Men.

In 1992 Peluso began working with Gustavo Santaolalla. They pioneered the Rock en Español genre. Peluso worked with Latin pop musicians such as Ricky Martin, and Mexican rock bands such as Molotov and Cafe Tacuba. In 2005 Santaolalla and Peluso produced the soundtrack to the motion picture Brokeback Mountain.

Peluso won four Grammy Awards during his career, and was awarded numerous gold and platinum records representing sales in excess of 150 million units during his diverse music career.

He died at age 60 in Los Angeles on June 5, 2010, from heart disease. He is survived by two sons.
