= The Essential Collection: 1965–1997 =

Compilation album by the Carpenters
- Released: 15 October 2002
- Recorded: 1965–1997
- Genre: Pop
- Length: 4:10:52
- Label: A&M
- Producer: Richard Carpenter

The Carpenters chronology
| As Time Goes By (2001) | The Essential Collection: 1965–1997 (2002) | Carpenters Perform Carpenter (2003) |

Professional ratings
Review scores
| Source | Rating |
|---|---|
| AllMusic | 4.5/5 stars |

The Essential Collection: 1965–1997 is a box-set compilation album by the Carpenters released in 2002.

== Overview ==
The box set is a revised version of the 1991 From the Top. The tracks are once again attributed by the year of recording. The timeline is extended to 1997 by the inclusion of a single post-1982 track, Richard Carpenter's "Karen's Theme" from Pianist, Arranger, Composer, Conductor.

While most of the previously unreleased tracks from From the Top were included on The Essential Collection several remained absent: a cover of The Beatles "Good Night" and Spanish version of "Sing" remained exclusive to From the Top; another absence are the tracks from Karen Carpenter's solo album which was finally released by the time of The Essential Collection.

The other difference is that The Essential Collection features more of the original mixes of the songs than From the Top and some alternative remixes as well.

== Track listings ==
=== Disc one ===
1965–1970

| No. | Title | Writer(s) | Original release, year of recording | Length |
|---|---|---|---|---|
| 1. | "Caravan" (Demo) | Juan Tizol, Irving Mills | From the Top, 1965 | 3:38 |
| 2. | "The Parting of Our Ways" (Demo) | Richard Carpenter | From the Top, 1966 | 2:20 |
| 3. | "Looking for Love" | Carpenter | Non-album single, 1966 | 1:52 |
| 4. | "I'll Be Yours" | Carpenter | Non-album single, 1966 | 2:28 |
| 5. | "Iced Tea" (Demo) | Carpenter | From the Top, 1966 | 2:36 |
| 6. | "You'll Love Me" (Demo) | Carpenter | From the Top, 1967 | 2:27 |
| 7. | "All I Can Do" (Demo) | Carpenter, John Bettis | From the Top, 1967 | 1:50 |
| 8. | "Don't Be Afraid" (Demo) | Carpenter | From the Top, 1968 | 3:20 |
| 9. | "Invocation" (Demo) | Carpenter, Bettis | From the Top, 1968 | 1:01 |
| 10. | "Your Wonderful Parade" (Demo) | Carpenter, Bettis | From the Top, 1968 | 2:23 |
| 11. | "All of My Life" (1987 remix) | Carpenter | Offering, 1969 | 3:02 |
| 12. | "Eve" (1987 remix) | Carpenter, Bettis | Offering, 1969 | 2:52 |
| 13. | "Ticket to Ride" (1973 version) | John Lennon, Paul McCartney | The Singles: 1969–1973, 1969 | 4:11 |
| 14. | "Get Together" (Your Navy Presents version) | Chet Powers | From the Top, 1970 | 2:40 |
| 15. | "Interview" (Your Navy Presents) | | From the Top, 1970 | 1:35 |
| 16. | "Love is Surrender" (1987 remix) | Ralph Carmichael | Close to You, 1970 | 1:59 |
| 17. | "Maybe It's You" (1990 remix) | Carpenter, Bettis | Close to You, 1970 | 3:09 |
| 18. | "(They Long to Be) Close to You" (Single version) | Burt Bacharach, Hal David | Close to You, 1970 | 3:42 |
| 19. | "Mr. Guder" (1991 remix) | Carpenter, Bettis | Close to You, 1970 | 3:20 |
| 20. | "We've Only Just Begun" | Paul Williams, Roger Nichols | Close to You, 1970 | 3:05 |
| 21. | "Merry Christmas Darling" (Single version) | Frank Pooler, Carpenter | Non-album single, 1970 | 3:05 |
| 22. | "For All We Know" | Fred Karlin, Arthur James, Robb Wilson | Carpenters, 1970 | 2:32 |

=== Disc two ===
1971–1973

| No. | Title | Writer(s) | Original release, year of recording | Length |
|---|---|---|---|---|
| 1. | "Rainy Days and Mondays" (1991 remix) | Williams, Nichols | Carpenters, 1971 | 3:36 |
| 2. | "Superstar" | Leon Russell, Bonnie Bramlett | Carpenters, 1971 | 3:45 |
| 3. | "Let Me Be the One" | Williams, Nichols | Carpenters, 1971 | 2:50 |
| 4. | "Bless the Beasts and Children" (1991 remix) | Barry DeVorzon, Perry Botkin Jr. | A Song for You, 1972 | 3:15 |
| 5. | "Hurting Each Other" | Gary Geld, Peter Udell | A Song for You, 1972 | 2:46 |
| 6. | "It's Going to Take Some Time" | Carole King, Toni Stern | A Song for You, 1972 | 2:55 |
| 7. | "I Won't Last a Day Without You" (1991 remix) | Williams, Nichols | A Song for You, 1972 | 3:54 |
| 8. | "A Song for You" (1987 remix) | Russel | A Song for You, 1972 | 4:42 |
| 9. | "Top of the World" | Carpenter, Bettis | A Song for You, 1972 | 2:59 |
| 10. | "Goodbye to Love" (1985 remix) | Carpenter, Bettis | A Song for You, 1972 | 4:00 |
| 11. | "This Masquerade" (1990 remix) | Russell | Now & Then, 1973 | 4:53 |
| 12. | "Sing" (1994 remix) | Joe Raposo | Now & Then, 1973 | 3:18 |
| 13. | "Jambalaya (On the Bayou)" (1991 remix) | Hank Williams, Moon Mullican | Now & Then, 1973 | 3:42 |
| 14. | "Yesterday Once More" (1985 remix) | Carpenter, Bettis | Now & Then, 1973 | 3:50 |
| 15. | "Oldies Medley": (a) "Fun, Fun, Fun"; (b) "The End of the World"; (c) "Da Doo Ron Ron (When He Walked Me Home)"; (d) "Dead Man's Curve"; (e) "Johnny Angel"; (f) "The Night Has a Thousand Eyes"; (g) "Our Day Will Come"; (h) "One Fine Day"" (1991 remix) | (a) Brian Wilson, Mike Love; (b) Arthur Kent, Sylvia Dee; (c) Ellie Greenwich, Jeff Barry, Phil Spector; (d) Jan Berry, Roger Christian, Wilson, Artie Kornfeld; (e) Lyn Duddy, Lee Pockriss; (f) Benjamin Weisman, Dorothy Wayne, Marilynn Garrett; (g) Bob Hilliard, Mort Garson; (h) King, Gerry Goffin | Now & Then, 1973 | 14:55 |
| 16. | "Yesterday Once More" (Reprise, 1990 remix) | Carpenter, Bettis | Now & Then, 1973 | 1:02 |
| 17. | "Radio Contest Outtakes" | | From the Top, 1973 | 1:53 |

=== Disc three ===
1974–1978

| No. | Title | Writer(s) | Original release, year of recording | Length |
|---|---|---|---|---|
| 1. | "Morinaga Hi-Crown Chocolate Commercial" | | Previously unreleased, 1974 | 0:35 |
| 2. | "Please Mr. Postman" (1991 remix) | Georgia Dobbins, William Garrett, Freddie Gorman, Brian Holland, Robert Bateman | Horizon, 1974 | 2:52 |
| 3. | "Santa Claus Is Comin' to Town" (1984 version) | J. Fred Coots, Haven Gillespie | An Old-Fashioned Christmas, 1974 | 4:08 |
| 4. | "Only Yesterday" | Carpenter, Bettis | Horizon, 1975 | 3:59 |
| 5. | "Solitaire" | Neil Sedaka, Phil Cody | Horizon, 1975 | 4:40 |
| 6. | "Tryin' to Get the Feeling Again" (1990 remix) | David Pomeranz | Interpretations, 1975 | 4:21 |
| 7. | "Good Friends Are for Keeps" | Jon Silberman | From the Top, 1975 | 1:08 |
| 8. | "Ordinary Fool" | Williams | Voice of the Heart, 1976 | 3:43 |
| 9. | "Sandy" | Carpenter, Bettis | A Kind of Hush, 1976 | 3:41 |
| 10. | "There's a Kind of Hush" (1985 remix) | Geoff Stephens, Les Reed | A Kind of Hush, 1976 | 2:56 |
| 11. | "I Need to Be in Love" (1990 remix) | Carpenter, Bettis, Albert Hammond | A Kind of Hush, 1976 | 3:48 |
| 12. | "From This Moment On" (Live) | Cole Porter | Live at the Palladium, 1976 | 2:13 |
| 13. | "Suntory Pop Jingle #1" | Hiromasa Suzuki, Yoko Narahashi | From the Top, 1977 | 0:33 |
| 14. | "Suntory Pop Jingle #2" | Tatsushi Umegaki, Yoko Narahashi | From the Top, 1977 | 0:34 |
| 15. | "All You Get from Love Is a Love Song" | Steve Eaton | Passage, 1977 | 3:46 |
| 16. | "Calling Occupants of Interplanetary Craft" (1989 remix) | Terry Draper, John Woloschuk | Passage, 1977 | 7:10 |
| 17. | "Sweet, Sweet Smile" | Otha Young, Juice Newton | Passage, 1977 | 3:02 |
| 18. | "Christ Is Born" (1991 remix) | Domenico Bartolucci, Ray Charles | Christmas Portrait, 1977 | 3:12 |
| 19. | "White Christmas" (1991 remix) | Irving Berlin | Christmas Portrait, 1977 | 2:29 |
| 20. | "Little Altar Boy" | Howlett Smith | An Old-Fashioned Christmas, 1978 | 3:44 |
| 21. | "Ave Maria" (1991 remix) | Johann Sebastian Bach, Charles Gounod) | Christmas Portrait, 1978 | 2:37 |

=== Disc four ===
1978–1997

| No. | Title | Writer(s) | Original release, year of recording | Length |
|---|---|---|---|---|
| 1. | "Where Do I Go from Here?" | Parker McGee | Lovelines, 1978 | 4:26 |
| 2. | "Little Girl Blue" | Richard Rodgers, Lorenz Hart | Lovelines, 1978 | 3:24 |
| 3. | "I Believe You" | Don Addrisi, Dick Addrisi | Made in America, 1978 | 3:54 |
| 4. | "If I Had You" | Steve Dorff, Gary Harju, Larry Herbstritt | Lovelines, 1979 | 3:57 |
| 5. | "Karen/Ella Medley"^{[a]}: (a) "This Masquerade"; (b) "My Funny Valentine"; (c) "I'll Be Seeing You"; (d) "Someone to Watch Over Me"; (e) "As Time Goes By"; (f) "Don't Get Around Much Anymore"; (g) "I Let a Song Go Out of My Heart" | (a) Russell; (b) Richard Rodgers, Lorenz Hart; (c) Sammy Fain, Irving Kahal; (d) George Gershwin, Ira Gershwin; (e) Herman Hupfeld; (f) Duke Ellington, Bob Russell; (g) Ellington, Irving Mills | As Time Goes By, 1980 | 5:57 |
| 6. | "1980 Medley": (a) "Sing"; (b) "Knowing When to Leave"; (c) "Make It Easy on Yourself"; (d) "Someday"; (e) "We've Only Just Begun" | (a) Raposo; (b) Bacharach, David; (c) Bacharach, David; (d) Carpenter, Bettis; (e) Williams, Nichols | From the Top, 1980 | 9:08 |
| 7. | "Make Believe It's Your First Time" | Bob Morrison, Johnny Wilson | Made in America, 1980 | 4:08 |
| 8. | "Touch Me When We're Dancing" | Terry Skinner, Kenny Bell, J.L. Wallace | Made in America, 1981 | 3:22 |
| 9. | "When It's Gone" | Randy Handley | Made in America, 1981 | 5:01 |
| 10. | "Because We Are in Love (The Wedding Song)" | Carpenter, Bettis | Made in America, 1981 | 5:02 |
| 11. | "Those Good Old Dreams" | Carpenter, Bettis | Made in America, 1981 | 4:12 |
| 12. | "Now" | Nichols, Dean Pitchford | Voice of the Heart, 1982 | 3:49 |
| 13. | "Karen's Theme^{[b]}" | Carpenter | Pianist, Arranger, Composer, Conductor, 1997 | 2:40 |

- ^{^[a]} From Music, Music, Music TV Special, performed by Karen Carpenter and Ella Fitzgerald
- ^{^[b]} Performed by Richard Carpenter
