= Love Songs (The Carpenters album) =

Compilation album by the Carpenters
- Released: 1997
- Recorded: 1970–1981
- Genre: Pop
- Length: 76:32
- Label: A&M
- Producer: Richard Carpenter

The Carpenters chronology
Reflections (1995)	Love Songs (1997)	The Singles: 1969–1981 (2000)

Professional ratings
Review scores
Source	Rating
AllMusic	4/5 stars
The Rolling Stone Album Guide	3/5 stars

Love Songs is a 1997 compilation album by the Carpenters.

It contains the duo's love ballads, from their first big hit, "(They Long to Be) Close to You" to their later songs, like "Make Believe It's Your First Time" and "Where Do I Go from Here?".

The compilation was certified Gold in the United States.

== Track listings ==
1. "I Need to Be in Love" (1990 Remix) — from the album A Kind of Hush
2. "Solitaire" — from the album Horizon
3. "We've Only Just Begun" (1991 Remix) — from the album Close to You
4. "This Masquerade" (1990 Remix) — from the album Now & Then
5. "You're the One" — from the album Lovelines
6. "Superstar" (1991 Remix) — from the album Carpenters
7. "Rainy Days and Mondays" (1991 Remix) — from the album Carpenters
8. "Top of the World" (Single Version) — from the album A Song for You
9. "Make Believe It's Your First Time" — from the album Voice of the Heart
10. "I Just Fall in Love Again" — from the album Passage
11. "(They Long to Be) Close to You" (1991 Remix) — from the album Close to You
12. "For All We Know" (1990 Remix) — from the album Carpenters
13. "Where Do I Go from Here?" — from the album Lovelines
14. "Only Yesterday" (1991 Remix) — from the album Horizon
15. "All You Get from Love Is a Love Song" — from the album Passage
16. "When I Fall in Love" — from the album Lovelines
17. "Hurting Each Other" — from the album A Song for You
18. "I Won't Last a Day Without You" (1991 Remix) — from the album A Song for You
19. "A Song for You" (1987 Remix) — from the album A Song for You
20. "Goodbye to Love" (1991 Remix) — from the album A Song for You

== Charts ==
Chart (1997–1998)	Peak position
Australian Albums (ARIA)	143
Norwegian Albums (VG-lista)	34
Scottish Albums (Official Charts)	66
UK Albums (Official Charts)	47
US Billboard 200	196

== Certifications ==
Region	Certification	Certified units/sales
United Kingdom (BPI)	Gold	100,000^{^}
United States (RIAA)	Gold	500,000^{^}
^{^} Shipments figures based on certification alone.
