= Interpretations (video) =

Video by Carpenters
- Released: May 9, 1995 (VHS); July 29, 2003 (DVD)
- Recorded: 1971–1980
- Genre: Pop
- Length: 35 minutes
- Label: A&M
- Producer: Richard Carpenter

Carpenters chronology
Yesterday Once More (1985)	Interpretations (1995)	Close to You: Remembering the Carpenters (1997)

Professional ratings
Review scores
Source	Rating
Allmusic	link
IMDb	link

The Carpenters' DVD Interpretations: A 25th Anniversary Celebration was originally released as a cassette tape and VHS tape in 1995 until 2003, with an updated release on DVD. The DVD primarily contains footage from the Carpenters' five TV specials and TV series from 1971 to 1980. It followed the compilation album of the same name, which had been released earlier the same year.

== Track listings ==
1. "Without a Song" – from the TV special Music, Music, Music! – air date: May 16, 1980
2. "Superstar" – from the TV special The Fifth Dimension's Traveling Sunshine Show – air date: August 18, 1971
3. "Rainy Days and Mondays" – from the TV series Make Your Own Kind of Music – air dates: July 20 and August 17, 1971
4. "(A Place to) Hideaway" – from the TV series Make Your Own Kind of Music – air date: August 10, 1971
5. "Ticket to Ride" – from the TV series Something Else – air date: March 2, 1970
6. "Reason to Believe" – from the TV series Make Your Own Kind of Music – air date: September 7, 1971
7. "(They Long to Be) Close to You" – from the TV series The Don Knotts Show – air date: September 15, 1970
8. "Calling Occupants of Interplanetary Craft" – from the TV special Space Encounters – air date: May 17, 1978
9. "Little Girl Blue" – from the TV special Space Encounters – air date: May 17, 1978
10. "Bless the Beasts and Children" – from the TV series Make Your Own Kind of Music – air date: August 31, 1971
11. "Please Mr. Postman" – promotional video – air date: January 1975
12. "We've Only Just Begun" – from the TV series Make Your Own Kind of Music – air date: September 7, 1971
13. "When I Fall in Love" – from the TV special Music, Music, Music! – air date: May 16, 1980
14. "Ave Maria" – from the TV special A Christmas Portrait – air date: December 19, 1978
15. "From This Moment On" – previously unreleased outtake from the TV special Music, Music, Music! (air date: May 16, 1980)

== Certifications and sales ==
Region	Certification	Certified units/sales
United Kingdom (BPI)	Gold	25,000^{^}
^{^} Shipments figures based on certification alone.
