= Interpretations: A 25th Anniversary Celebration =

Interpretations

Compilation album by the Carpenters
- Released: 1994 (Canada/UK) February 7, 1995 (US)
- Recorded: 1970–1981
- Genre: Pop
- Length: 60:00
- Label: A&M/Universal Music Distribution
- Producer: Richard Carpenter

The Carpenters chronology
From the Top (1991)	Interpretations (1994)	Reflections (1995)

Singles from Interpretations
- 1. "Tryin' to Get the Feeling Again" Released: 1994

Professional ratings
Review scores
Source	Rating
AllMusic	3/5 stars

Interpretations is a compilation album by the Carpenters, released in 1994 in Canada/UK & February 1995 in the US in both cassette tape and CD formats.

== Background ==
The album was released in order to commemorate the 25th anniversary of the duo's debut album Offering. As the name suggests, the compilation does not include any compositions written by Richard Carpenter.

Three of the songs on Interpretations were previously unreleased: "Without a Song", "From This Moment On" (both recorded in 1980 for Music, Music, Music!) and "Tryin' to Get the Feeling Again" (recorded in 1975 for Horizon album).

US version of the album featured alternate tracklisting, removing some of the songs ("Sing", "Where Do I Go from Here", "Desperado", "Ticket to Ride", "If I Had You", "Please Mr. Postman" and "You're the One") and adding different ones ("I Believe You" and "Reason to Believe").

A video album of the same name was released in 1995, featuring footage from the duo's TV performances and promotional videos.

== Track listing ==
No.	Title	Original release	Length
1.	"Without a Song (A Capella Version)"	Previously unreleased	1:00
2.	"Sing" (1994 remix)	Now & Then, 1973	3:18
3.	"Bless the Beasts and Children" (1985 remix)	A Song for You, 1972	3:15
4.	"This Masquerade" (1990 remix)	Now & Then, 1973	4:53
5.	"Solitaire"	Horizon, 1975	4:40
6.	"When I Fall in Love" (1990 remix)	Lovelines, 1989	3:08
7.	"From This Moment On"	Previously unreleased	1:57
8.	"Tryin' to Get the Feeling Again"	Previously unreleased	4:21
9.	"When It's Gone"	Made in America, 1981	5:00
10.	"Where Do I Go from Here"	Lovelines, 1989	4:24
11.	"Desperado" (1994 remix)	Horizon, 1975	3:37
12.	"Superstar" (1991 remix)	Carpenters, 1971	3:48
13.	"Rainy Days and Mondays" (1991 remix)	Carpenters, 1971	3:36
14.	"Ticket to Ride" (1973 version)	The Singles: 1969–1973, 1973	4:10
15.	"If I Had You"	Lovelines, 1989	3:57
16.	"Please Mr. Postman" (1991 remix)	Horizon, 1975	2:46
17.	"We've Only Just Begun" (1985 remix)	Close to You, 1970	3:04
18.	"Calling Occupants of Interplanetary Craft (The Recognized Anthem of World Contact Day)" (1989 remix)	Passage, 1977	7:08
19.	"Little Girl Blue"	Lovelines, 1989	3:24
20.	"You're the One"	Lovelines, 1989	4:14
21.	"(They Long to Be) Close to You" (1991 remix)	Close to You, 1970	3:42

=== US Version ===
1. "Without a Song" – 1:02
2. "Superstar" – 3:48
3. "Rainy Days and Mondays" – 3:36
4. "Bless the Beasts and Children" – 3:15
5. "This Masquerade" – 4:53
6. "Solitaire" – 4:40
7. "When I Fall in Love" – 3:08
8. "From This Moment On" – 1:57
9. "Tryin' to Get the Feeling Again" – 4:23
10. "When It's Gone" – 5:01
11. "I Believe You" – 3:55 (From the album Made in America, 1981)
12. "Reason to Believe" (1987 remix) – 3:04 (From the album Close to You, 1970)
13. "(They Long to Be) Close to You" – 3:42
14. "Calling Occupants of Interplanetary Craft" – 7:08
15. "Little Girl Blue" – 3:24
16. "We've Only Just Begun" – 3:04

== Charts ==
Chart (1994–1995)	Peak position
Australian Albums (ARIA)	126
Scottish Albums (Official Charts)	46
UK Albums (Official Charts)	29

== Certifications ==
Region	Certification	Certified units/sales
United Kingdom (BPI)	Silver	60,000^{^}
^{^} Shipments figures based on certification alone.
