= Close to You: Remembering The Carpenters =

1998 The Carpenters documentary

Video by The Carpenters
- Released: March 1, 1998 (VHS & DVD)
- Genre: Documentary
- Length: 100 min.
- Label: MPI Home Video
- Director: Ron Tosches
- Producers: JoAnn Young, Paul Surratt, Bill DiCicco, Laura L. Bucuzzo

The Carpenters chronology
| Interpretations (1995) | Close to You: Remembering The Carpenters (1998) | Gold: Greatest Hits (2002) |

Close to You: Remembering The Carpenters is a 100-minute-long documentary that was released on VHS, LASERDISC and DVD by MPI Home Video. It features interviews by Richard Carpenter, John Bettis (co-writer), Gary Sims (part-time member), Petula Clark, et al.

The documentary itself runs for approximately 60 minutes, with a 12-minute encore after the end credits featuring a performance of "(A Place To) Hideaway", the Carpenters' commercial for Morton's Potato Chips, and their performance of "Ave Maria" for the 1978 A Christmas Portrait special. The rest of the 100-minute total running time includes the special features (listed below).

The documentary originally aired as a special on PBS and continues to be made available to PBS stations for rerunning during pledge drives.

== Chapters ==
1. Introduction ("Superstar", "Rainy Days and Mondays", "We've Only Just Begun", "(They Long to Be) Close to You")
2. "Yesterday Once More" – Thank You Rock 'n' Roll, 1978
3. "Dancing in the Street" – Your All American College Show, 1968
4. "Ticket to Ride" – Something Else, 1970
5. "(They Long to Be) Close to You" – Make Your Own Kind of Music, 1971
6. "We've Only Just Begun" – Make Your Own Kind of Music, 1971
7. "For All We Know" – The Andy Williams Show, 1971
8. "Bless the Beasts and Children" – Make Your Own Kind of Music, 1971
9. "Rainy Days and Mondays" – Desert Inn, then fades into Make Your Own Kind of Music, 1971
10. "Superstar" – 1971
11. "Hurting Each Other" – 1972
12. "Goodbye to Love" – 1972
13. "Top of the World" – Carpenters' Very First Television Special, 1976
14. And the Story Continues...
15. "Only Yesterday" – 1975
16. "Merry Christmas Darling" – A Christmas Portrait, 1978
17. "This Masquerade" – Music, Music, Music!, 1980
18. "Touch Me When We're Dancing" – 1981
19. Finale
20. "(They Long to Be) Close to You" – Carpenters' Very First Television Special, 1976
21. End Credits
22. Encore Program
23. "(A Place To) Hideaway" – Make Your Own Kind of Music, 1971
24. Potato Chip Commercial – Morton's Potato Chip Company, 1971
25. "Ave Maria" – A Christmas Portrait, 1978
26. TV Special Promo – 1980

Bonus material:

- Photo gallery (1991 remix, Richard Carpenter's Pianist • Arranger • Composer • Conductor version, and reprise of "Yesterday Once More")
- At the White House (Rare footage of Nixon and the Carpenters; "Top of the World") – 1972
- Radio Jingle – KFRC Radio
- Chocolate Commercial – Morinaga Hi-Crown Milk Chocolates, 1974
- Soda Pop Commercials – Suntory Pop, 1977

== Certifications and sales ==
| Region | Certification | Certified units/sales |
|---|---|---|
| United States (RIAA) | Gold | 50,000^{^} |
^{^} Shipments figures based on certification alone.
