= As Time Goes By (The Carpenters album) =

Compilation album by the Carpenters
- Released: August 1, 2001
- Recorded: 1967–1980, 1999
- Genres: Pop, adult contemporary
- Length: 63:07
- Label: A&M/Universal
- Producer: Richard Carpenter

The Carpenters chronology
Gold: Greatest Hits (2000)	As Time Goes By (2001)	The Essential Collection: 1965–1997 (2002)

Singles from As Time Goes By
- 1. "The Rainbow Connection" Released: July 25, 2001

Professional ratings
Review scores
Source	Rating
AllMusic	2/5 stars
Uncut	1.5/5 stars

As Time Goes By is a studio album by the American music duo the Carpenters. It is a collection of songs taken from demos, outtakes, live performances, and television specials recorded by the Carpenters between 1967 and 1980.

== Background ==
Most of the tracks on the album are taken from three Carpenters Television Specials: First Television Special ("Medley: Superstar/Rainy Days and Mondays" and "Hits Medley '76"), Space Encounters ("Dancing in the Street", "Medley: Close Encounters/Star Wars"), Music, Music, Music ("Without a Song", "I Got Rhythm Medley", "Dizzy Fingers", "You're Just in Love", "Karen/Ella Medley")

Additional tracks are also taken from TV Specials: "Carpenters/Como Medley" is taken from the Perry Como's 1974 Christmas Special and "And When He Smiles" is taken from BBC's In Concert TV Series.

The album includes the previously unreleased songs "The Rainbow Connection" (originally from the Made in America sessions) and "Leave Yesterday Behind" (a ballad that was recorded for a TV movie of the same name), and the Carpenters' versions of "California Dreamin'" and "Nowhere Man" from the original demos that got them their first record deal.

Due to the fact that some tracks had lost multi-track masters and were sourced from mono 1/2-inch audio tape, or mono TV videotape masters, Richard Carpenter re-recorded several parts of the songs specifically for this album. For songs that still had the original multi-track tapes, but had appeared on TV in mono, he remixed them in stereo from the multi-tracks.

== Release ==
The album was first released in Japan on August 1, 2001.

== Track listing ==
No.	Title	Writer(s)	Length
1.	"Without a Song"	Edward Eliscu; Billy Rose; Vincent Youmans	1:58
2.	"Medley: Superstar/Rainy Days and Mondays"	Bonnie Bramlett; Leon Russell / Paul Williams; Roger Nichols	3:10
3.	"Nowhere Man" (Demo)	Lennon–McCartney	2:56
4.	"I Got Rhythm Medley": "I Got Rhythm"; "'S Wonderful"; "Rhapsody in Blue"; "Fascinating Rhythm"	George Gershwin; Ira Gershwin	4:43
5.	"Dancing in the Street"	Ivy Hunter; Marvin Gaye; William Stevenson	2:01
6.	"Dizzy Fingers"	Edward Elzear "Zez" Confrey	3:34
7.	"You're Just in Love"	Irving Berlin	3:46
8.	"Karen/Ella Medley": "This Masquerade"; "My Funny Valentine"; "I'll Be Seeing You"; "Someone to Watch Over Me"; "As Time Goes By"; "Don't Get Around Much Anymore"; "I Let a Song Go Out of My Heart" (with Ella Fitzgerald)	Leon Russell / Richard Rodgers; Lorenz Hart / Sammy Fain; Irving Kahal / George Gershwin; Ira Gershwin / Herman Hupfeld / Duke Ellington; Bob Russell / Duke Ellington; Irving Mills	6:00
9.	"Medley: Close Encounters/Star Wars"	John Williams	6:01
10.	"Leave Yesterday Behind"	Fred Karlin	3:34
11.	"Carpenters/Como Medley": "Yesterday Once More"; "Magic Moments"; "Sing"; "Catch a Falling Star"; "Close to You"; "It's Impossible"; "We've Only Just Begun"; "And I Love You So"; "Don't Let the Stars Get in Your Eyes"; "'Till the End of Time"; "No Other Love"	John Bettis; Richard Carpenter / Burt Bacharach; Hal David / Joe Raposo / Lee Pockriss; Paul Vance / Bacharach; David / Armando Manzanero; Sid Wayne / Paul Williams; Roger Nichols / Don McLean / Slim Willet / Buddy Kaye; Ted Mossman / Richard Rodgers; Oscar Hammerstein II	6:56
12.	"California Dreamin'" (Demo)	John Phillips; Michelle Phillips	2:33
13.	"The Rainbow Connection"	Paul Williams; Kenneth Ascher	4:36
14.	"Hits Medley '76": "Sing"; "Close to You"; "For All We Know"; "Ticket to Ride"; "Only Yesterday"; "I Won't Last a Day Without You"; "Goodbye to Love"	Joe Raposo / Burt Bacharach; Hal David / Fred Karlin; James Griffin; Robb Wilson / Lennon–McCartney / John Bettis; Richard Carpenter / Paul Williams; Roger Nichols / Bettis; Carpenter	8:13
15.	"And When He Smiles"	Al Anderson	3:06

== Personnel ==
- Lead Vocals: Karen Carpenter, Richard Carpenter, Perry Como, Ella Fitzgerald
- Guitar: Tim May, Tony Peluso. Steel Pedal: JayDee Maness
- Banjo, Mandolin: Tim May
- Bass: Chuck Berghofer, Bob Messenger, Joe Osborn, Dan Woodhams
- Piano: Richard Carpenter, Pete Jolly
- Drums: Karen Carpenter, Harvey Mason, Cubby O'Brien, Ron Tutt
- Harmonica: Tommy Morgan
- Clarinet: Doug Strawn
- Oboe: English Horn: Earle Dumler
- Saxophone: Jack Nimitz, Tom Scott
- Flute: Bob Messenger, Sheridon Stokes
- Flugelhorn: Buddy Childers
- Backing Vocals: The O.K. Chorale

== Charts ==
Chart performance for As Time Goes By
Chart (2001)	Peak position
Japanese Albums (Oricon)	18
