= Reflections (The Carpenters album) =

Compilation album by the Carpenters
- Released: January 12, 1995
- Recorded: 1969–1981
- Genre: Pop
- Label: A&M
- Producers: Jack Daugherty; Richard Carpenter

The Carpenters chronology
Interpretations (1994)	Reflections (1995)	Love Songs (1997)

Professional ratings
Review scores
Source	Rating
AllMusic	3/5 stars

Reflections is a compilation album by US pop group the Carpenters.

== Overview ==
Rather than contain the duo's greatest hits, this compilation includes mostly their lesser known songs.

Reflections was originally released in 1995 and later reissued on a number of occasions and under different names.

== Track listing ==
1. "I Need to Be in Love"
2. "I Just Fall in Love Again"
3. "Baby It's You" (Remix)
4. "Can't Smile Without You" (single version)
5. "Beechwood 4-5789"
6. "Eve" (Remix)
7. "All of My Life" (Remix)
8. "Reason to Believe" (Remix)
9. "Your Baby Doesn't Love You Anymore"
10. "Maybe It's You" (Remix)
11. "Ticket to Ride"
12. "Sweet, Sweet Smile"
13. "A Song for You"
14. "Because We Are in Love (The Wedding Song)"

== Certifications ==
Region	Certification	Certified units/sales
United Kingdom (BPI)	Silver	60,000^{^}
^{^} Shipments figures based on certification alone.
