= Morton's Potato Chips =

American food company

A bag of Morton's Potato Chips, from a 1971 commercial.

Morton's Potato Chips was a potato chip company popular in Texas, United States. This company was popular for their corn chips called Chip-Os, and for the fact that The Carpenters – a vocal and instrumental American duo, consisting of siblings Karen and Richard Carpenter – did a commercial for them in the 1970s. Morton's was a notable potato chip company in Dallas in the 1960s and 1970s. The Carpenters sponsored Morton's in 1971. In addition to having bags of potato chips, Morton's also distributed tin cans of potato chips, which have often available for sale on eBay.

Morton Foods merged with General Mills in 1964.

== The Carpenters' commercial ==
According to Richard Carpenter, the jingle was written in the Carpenters key, and it worked out perfectly for them. The jingle included many special effects including warping of images and intricate zooms, as demonstrated in the image shown below right.

In Close to You: Remembering the Carpenters, Carpenter notes that the backing track for the jingle was previously recorded in the Carpenters' key, but then Karen and Richard recorded their overdubbed vocals. The video was recorded on Yonge Street in Toronto, Ontario, Canada in 1971 during a major worldwide Carpenters tour.

The Carpenters rarely did commercials, and this advertisement for Morton's Potato Chips was one of only a few commercials they chose to endorse.

The Carpenters singing a jingle for Morton's Potato Chips.
