= Make Your Own Kind of Music (TV series) =

American television series

- The cast sings the theme song to the show
- Developed by: Tomka Productions
- Starring: The Carpenters; Al Hirt; Mark Lindsay; Patchett & Tarses; The Doodletown Pipers
- Narrated by: Dick Tufeld
- Opening theme: "Make Your Own Kind of Music" by the cast of MYOKOM
- Ending theme: "Make Your Own Kind of Music" by the cast of MYOKOM
- Country of origin: United States
- Original language: English
- No. of episodes: 8

Production
- Camera setup: Multiple-camera setup
- Running time: One hour (with commercials); Approx. 45 minutes (without commercials)
- Production companies: Tomka Productions Inc., in association with NBC

Original release
- Network: NBC
- Release: July 20 – September 7, 1971

Make Your Own Kind of Music was an American summer replacement television series starring The Carpenters that aired on NBC between July 6, 1971, and September 7, 1971. It was a replacement for "The Don Knotts Show," in the Tuesday evening time slot from 8-9 p.m. (Eastern), and was produced by Stan Harris for Tomka Productions.

The Carpenters were joined by Al Hirt, Mark Lindsay, the Doodletown Pipers, and comedy team Tom Patchett and Jay Tarses. Guest stars that appeared during the eight-episode series included Herb Alpert, Jose Feliciano, Dusty Springfield, and Helen Reddy.

The show's title was taken from the song recorded by Mama Cass, and was sung at the beginning and end of each broadcast by the show regulars.

A key concept of the series involved the alphabet. In the first week, Herb Alpert introduced the show, standing next to a big letter "A." During each week's show, the cast would work its way through the alphabet, ending the program with the letter "Z."

Author Merle Miller, guest critic for TV Guide, was not fond of the concept:

the show is burdened, is very nearly sunk, by a "gimmick." Each number is introduced by the labored use of a letter of the alphabet. Twenty-six cringes a week. Did they have in mind a Sesame Street for adults? Possibly. But no adult over the age of 8 will be either enlightened or amused.

The series ended when the fall television season premiered.

== Videos from the series released on DVD ==
- "(They Long to Be) Close to You" – Gold: Greatest Hits (2002), letter "Y" for "You"

Air date: July 20, 1971

- "Rainy Days and Mondays" – Interpretations (1995), letter "K" for "Karen"

Air date: July 20 & August 17, 1971

- "Reason to Believe" – Interpretations (1995), letter "K" for "Karen"

Air date: September 7, 1971

- "We've Only Just Begun" – Interpretations (1995), letter "Y" for "You"

Air date: September 7, 1971

- "Bless the Beasts and Children" – Interpretations (1995), letter "F" for "Film (Music)"

Air date: August 31, 1971

- "(A Place To) Hideaway" – Close to You: Remembering The Carpenters (1997), letter "K" for "Karen"

Air date: August 10, 1971
