= The Carpenters...Space Encounters =

1978 American television special

- Genre: Musical
- Written by: Bill Larkin; Tom Sawyer; Stephen Spears; Joe Neustein
- Directed by: Bob Henry
- Starring: Richard Carpenter; Karen Carpenter; John Davidson; Suzanne Somers; Charlie Callas
- Country of origin: United States
- Original language: English
- No. of episodes: 1

Production
- Executive producer: Jerry Weintraub
- Producer: Bob Henry
- Editor: Jim Frazier
- Camera setup: Multi-camera setup
- Running time: 60 minutes
- Production companies: Downey-Bronx, ABC

Original release
- Network: ABC
- Release: May 17, 1978

The Carpenters...Space Encounters is a television special featuring the American pop duo The Carpenters. It was first shown on ABC on May 17, 1978.

== Synopsis ==
Space Encounters begins with Richard and Karen Carpenter performing "Sweet, Sweet Smile" in their recording studio, assisted by Charlie Callas. As they are performing, we see that they are being observed by the occupants of an alien spaceship (John Davidson and Suzanne Somers) who are on their way to Earth to meet The Carpenters. After Richard and Karen finish the song, the lights in the studio begin to flicker uncontrollably and musical instruments begin to move and play by themselves. At that moment, John teleports down to the studio and tells Richard and Karen how the people from his planet lack the ability to make music and he requests their help. Richard and Karen tell John about their earlier days in music and John uses his hi-tech pocket video screen to show The Carpenters performing "Fun Fun Fun" and "Dancing in the Street". After watching them, John tells them he wants to try singing himself and teleports to a more romantic setting to perform "Just the Way You Are".

The Carpenters continue to reminisce about their earlier recordings and they perform "Goofus" in an old garage, similar to the one in which they recorded their first record.

Richard, on piano, then performs the Space Encounters Medley, which includes the themes to Close Encounters of the Third Kind and Star Wars, on stage with a full orchestra, complete with laser and starlight effects.

Back in the recording studio, Karen and John continue to reminisce about her early days in music and she performs "Little Girl Blue". Afterwards, everybody teleports up to the spaceship's own nightclub, "The Galaxy Room", where Richard plays "Piano Picker", and Karen and Suzanne perform "Man Smart, Woman Smarter". Karen and John then perform "The Old-Fashioned Way" and then the whole cast (complete with dancers) perform a disco-medley including "The Hustle", "Boogie Nights" and "I Could Have Danced All Night".

The Carpenters then perform "Calling Occupants of Interplanetary Craft" and the show ends with an instrumental version of "We've Only Just Begun".

== Guest stars ==
- John Davidson
- Suzanne Somers
- Charlie Callas

== Carpenters songs performed on Space Encounters ==
- "Sweet, Sweet Smile" – Passage (1977)
- "Fun Fun Fun" – Now & Then (1973)
- "Dancing in the Street" – As Time Goes By (2001)
- "Goofus" – A Kind of Hush (1976)
- Space Encounters Medley – As Time Goes By (2001)
- "Little Girl Blue" – Lovelines (1989)
- "Piano Picker" – A Song for You (1972)
- "Man Smart, Woman Smarter" – Passage (1977)
- "Calling Occupants of Interplanetary Craft" – Passage (1977)

== Reception ==
Kay Gardella of the New York Daily News was charmed by the special, saying "It's fun! It's slick! It's an hour that shows fruitful creative effort." A preview in the Shreveport Times was less enthusiastic, but assured readers that "the musical numbers spotlight real talent," so "one can overlook the weakness of the script."
