= All You Get from Love Is a Love Song =

- Cover to "All You Get from Love Is a Love Song"

Single by Carpenters

from the album Passage
- B-side: "I Have You"
- Released: May 2, 1977
- Recorded: March 1977
- Genre: Pop
- Length: 3:46
- Label: A&M; 1940
- Songwriter: Steve Eaton
- Producer: Richard Carpenter

Carpenters singles chronology
"Breaking Up Is Hard to Do" (1976)	"All You Get from Love Is a Love Song" (1977)	"Calling Occupants of Interplanetary Craft" (1977)

"All You Get from Love Is a Love Song" is a song composed by Steve Eaton. Previously recorded by The Righteous Brothers in 1975, it was popularized by the Carpenters in 1977. It was released to the public on May 21, 1977. Its B-side was "I Have You", a song released on the A Kind of Hush album in 1976. The song was also included on their 1977 album, Passage.

In the late 1970s, this particular track appeared in a Top 10 of misheard lyrics (and is often on similar forums online). This was compiled by Noel Edmonds and the misheard lyric sounds like: "Because the best love songs are written with a broken arm," as opposed to the correct lyrics "Because the best love songs are written with a broken heart."

== Charts ==
=== Weekly charts ===
Chart (1977)	Peak position
US Billboard Hot 100	35
US Adult Contemporary (Billboard)	4
US Cashbox Radio Active Airplay Singles	11
Canadian (RPM) Top Singles	38
Canadian (RPM) Adult Contemporary	5
Oricon (Japanese) Singles Chart	68
Australia (Kent Music Report)	89
US Cash Box Top 100	43

=== Year-end charts ===
Chart (1977)	Rank
US Adult Contemporary (Billboard)	29

== Personnel ==
- Karen Carpenter – lead and backing vocals
- Richard Carpenter – Fender Rhodes electric piano, piano, orchestration
- Joe Osborn – bass guitar
- Ed Greene – drums
- Tony Peluso – guitar
- Ray Parker Jr. – guitar
- Tommy Vig - congas
- Jerry Steinholtz - percussion
- Tom Scott – tenor saxophone, baritone sax, flute
- Julia Tillman – backing vocals
- Carlene Williams – backing vocals
- Maxine Willard – backing vocals

== Music video ==
The music video to "All You Get from Love Is a Love Song" takes place in the A&M Studios. It starts off with the bongo drum and fades into a camera angle zooming towards Karen Carpenter. At the end of the video, the performance fades into a picture of the Carpenters' Hollywood Walk of Fame Star, which is the beginning to the video "Top of the World", performed on The Carpenters' First Television Special in 1976. It can be found on the DVD Gold: Greatest Hits. The tenor saxophone solo was performed by Tom Scott (also the tenor sax soloist on "Jazzman" by Carole King), who was then one of the hottest "session players" of the '70s.
