= All of My Life (The Carpenters song) =

Single by the Carpenters

from the album Ticket to Ride
- A-side: "We've Only Just Begun"
- Released: August 21, 1970
- Recorded: 1969
- Length: 3:05
- Label: A&M (1217)
- Songwriter: Richard Carpenter
- Producer: Jack Daugherty

The Carpenters singles chronology
"We've Only Just Begun" (1970)	"All of My Life" (1970)	"Merry Christmas Darling" (1970)

Ticket to Ride track listing
- 13 tracks Side one: 1. "Invocation"; 2. "Your Wonderful Parade"; 3. "Someday"; 4. "Get Together"; 5. "All of My Life"; 6. "Turn Away"; Side two: 1. "Ticket to Ride"; 2. "Don't Be Afraid"; 3. "What's the Use?"; 4. "All I Can Do"; 5. "Eve"; 6. "Nowadays' Clancy Can't Even Sing"; 7. "Benediction"

"All of My Life" is a ballad written by Richard Carpenter. The Carpenters recorded it for their debut album, Offering. It is one of only two tracks on which Karen Carpenter is recorded playing the bass guitar.

It was later used as the B-side to "We've Only Just Begun" single.

Richard Carpenter did a remix of the song in 1987 with crisper vocals, a different electric piano, and more reverberation. It was released on the From the Top box set in 1991.
