= The Carpenters: A Christmas Portrait =

- Genre: Music
- Written by: Rod Warren
- Directed by: Bob Henry
- Starring: Karen Carpenter; Richard Carpenter; The Richard Carpenter Trio; Gene Kelly; Jimmy McNichol; Kristy McNichol; Georgia Engel; Peter Pit
- Country of origin: United States
- Original language: English

Production
- Executive producer: Jerry Weintraub
- Producer: Bob Henry
- Editor: Jimmy B. Frazier
- Running time: 60 minutes
- Production company: Downey-Bronx Productions

Original release
- Network: ABC
- Release: December 19, 1978

The Carpenters: A Christmas Portrait is a Christmas television special featuring The Carpenters that aired on ABC on December 19, 1978. It was the second Christmas TV special that the pop duo made and was taped in October 1978.

== Production ==
The special stars Richard and Karen Carpenter, with special guests Gene Kelly, Kristy and Jimmy McNichol, Georgia Engel, "and magician Peter Pit."

It was written by Rod Warren and directed by Bob Henry. Henry was chosen because the Carpenters wanted the focus on their music, rather than comedy. Richard did not participate in the comic relief portion of singing "Christmas Angels" in angel costumes.

The special is named after the Carpenters' recently released Christmas album Christmas Portrait, which was formally released on October 13, 1978.

Richard Carpenter was in bad health during the production of the special, unable to arrange their songs, and in his own words: "I was rail thin and Karen didn't look much better." Besides having to outsource the arrangement work, he thought the McNichols were poor singers, but Karen was friends with Kristy, who in turn insisted that her brother be included in the show, while Richard thought "Jimmy was no musical talent." On the other hand, many fans thought that the McNicholls were talented in their own way.

== Music ==
1. "Christmas Waltz" (performed by Karen Carpenter)
2. Opening Title Song ("We've Only Just Begun" instrumental)
3. "Santa Claus Is Coming to Town" (performed by Karen Carpenter)
4. "Jingle Bells" (performed by Karen Carpenter)
5. "Brothers and Sisters" (performed by Carpenters with Kristy and Jimmy McNichol)
6. "Merry Christmas Darling" (performed by Karen Carpenter)
7. "Christmas in Killarney" (performed by Gene Kelly)
8. "Selections from The Nutcracker" (instrumental, performed by Richard Carpenter)
9. "Toyland" (performed by Richard Carpenter)
10. "Christmas Angels" (performed by Karen Carpenter, Georgia Engel, and Kristy McNichol)
11. "O Come All Ye Faithful" (performed by Gene Kelly, Karen Carpenter, Richard Carpenter)
12. "Silent Night" (performed by Karen Carpenter and Georgia Engel)
13. "Fum, Fum, Fum" (performed by Kristy and Jimmy McNichol)
14. "Ave Maria" (performed by Karen Carpenter)
15. Closing Music ("We've Only Just Begun" instrumental)

== Synopsis ==
The synopsis of the special revolves around Karen and Richard throwing their annual Christmas party (just like the previous Christmas), and interactions with their guests as they take turns singing.

They invited all their special guests and the guests take turns giving their gifts to one another by song. Agnes and Harold Carpenter (Richard and Karen's parents) have cameos in this special. Richard opposed it at the time, but came to treasure the memories. Richard also would not participate in the comic relief set that involved the three female singers wearing angel costumes.

The last four songs just talk about the history of Christmas music and show a variety of selections from different cultures and languages. It was "groovy" but not "edgier".
