= Ticket to Ride (album) =

Ticket to Ride/Offering
- Cover photo by Jim McCrary

Studio album by the Carpenters
- Released: October 9, 1969 (Offering); November 10, 1970 (Ticket to Ride)
- Studio: A&M Studios (Los Angeles)
- Genres: Pop; soft rock
- Length: 36:52
- Label: A&M
- Producer: Jack Daugherty

The Carpenters chronology
Ticket to Ride/Offering (1969)	Close to You (1970)

Original cover

Singles from Offering
- 1. "Ticket to Ride" Released: November 5, 1969

Professional ratings
Review scores
Source	Rating
AllMusic	3/5 stars
The Rolling Stone Album Guide	2/5 stars

Ticket to Ride (originally released as Offering) is the debut studio album by the American music duo the Carpenters.

== Background ==
The album is far more self-contained than subsequent Carpenters albums; excluding the orchestrations, bass by Joe Osborn and occasional guitar from Gary Sims, most of the instruments were played by Karen and Richard Carpenter themselves—drums and keyboards respectively—and 10 of the 13 songs were written by Richard and his lyricist John Bettis.

It also stands out from subsequent Carpenters albums in that the lead vocals are evenly split between the two band members; on later albums, Karen would perform most of the lead vocals and this is one of two albums where Karen provided virtually all of the drumming, the other being Now & Then, released in 1973.

== Release ==
At the time of the album's initial release in 1969, it was issued under the title Offering, with a different cover photo. It was a commercial failure and produced only one minor hit single, a ballad version of the Lennon-McCartney song "Ticket to Ride".

After the Carpenters' subsequent breakthrough, however, the album was reissued internationally under the name Ticket to Ride and sold moderately.

== Reception ==
In their review, Billboard noted that "brother and sister Richard and Karen Carpenter have come up with fresh and original concepts of music and singing in this debut LP on A&M. Richard's songs and arrangements, especially the overdubbing of his and Karen's voices, combine the best elements of pop, folk-rock, and jazz, and their version of the now classic "Get Together" makes it sound very new. With radio programming support, Carpenters should have a big hit on their hands."

In a retrospective review, Allmusic stated that "Karen and Richard Carpenter issued a finely crafted record that moved effortlessly between Spanky & Our Gang-style pop/rock ("Your Wonderful Parade") and art-song. In some ways, Ticket to Ride is the Carpenters' most interesting album, for it contains a range of interests and sounds that were modified or abandoned on subsequent albums. The lushly orchestrated "Someday" is a brilliant showcase for Richard's arranging skills and the most dramatic side of Karen's voice - it points the way toward songs like "Crescent Noon" on the next album, and although that highly dramatic sound proved a blind alley, it did result in some ravishing performances by the duo."

== Track listing ==
All tracks written by Richard Carpenter and John Bettis, except where noted.

Side one
No.	Title	Writer(s)	Lead vocals	Length
1.	"Invocation"		Karen and Richard Carpenter	1:04
2.	"Your Wonderful Parade"		Richard Carpenter	2:54
3.	"Someday"		Karen Carpenter	5:19
4.	"Get Together"	Chet Powers	Richard Carpenter	2:37
5.	"All of My Life"	Richard Carpenter	Karen Carpenter	3:07
6.	"Turn Away"		Richard Carpenter	3:12

Side two
No.	Title	Writer(s)	Lead vocals	Length
7.	"Ticket to Ride"	Lennon–McCartney	Karen Carpenter	4:13
8.	"Don't Be Afraid"	Richard Carpenter	Karen Carpenter	2:07
9.	"What's the Use"		Richard Carpenter	2:43
10.	"All I Can Do"		Karen Carpenter	1:41
11.	"Eve"		Karen Carpenter	2:53
12.	"Nowadays Clancy Can't Even Sing"	Neil Young	Richard Carpenter	4:21
13.	"Benediction"		Karen and Richard Carpenter	0:41

== Personnel ==
- Richard Carpenter – lead and backing vocals, piano, Wurlitzer electric piano, harpsichord
- Karen Carpenter – lead and backing vocals, drums, electric bass on "All of My Life" and "Eve"
- Joe Osborn – bass
- Bob Messenger – bass
- Gary Sims – guitar on "All of My Life"
- Gayle Levant – harp
- Herb Alpert – shakers

Technical

- Producer: Jack Daugherty
- Engineer: Ray Gerhardt
- Art director: Tom Wilkes
- Photographer: Jim McCrary
- Bernie Grundman, Richard Carpenter – remastering at Bernie Grundman Mastering

== Charts ==
Chart (1971–1972)	Peak position
Australian Albums (Kent Music Report)	19
Japanese Albums (Oricon)	88
UK Albums (Official Charts)	20
US Billboard 200	150

== Certifications ==
Region	Certification	Certified units/sales
United Kingdom (BPI)	Silver	60,000^{^}
^{^} Shipments figures based on certification alone.
