= Without a Song =

1929 song

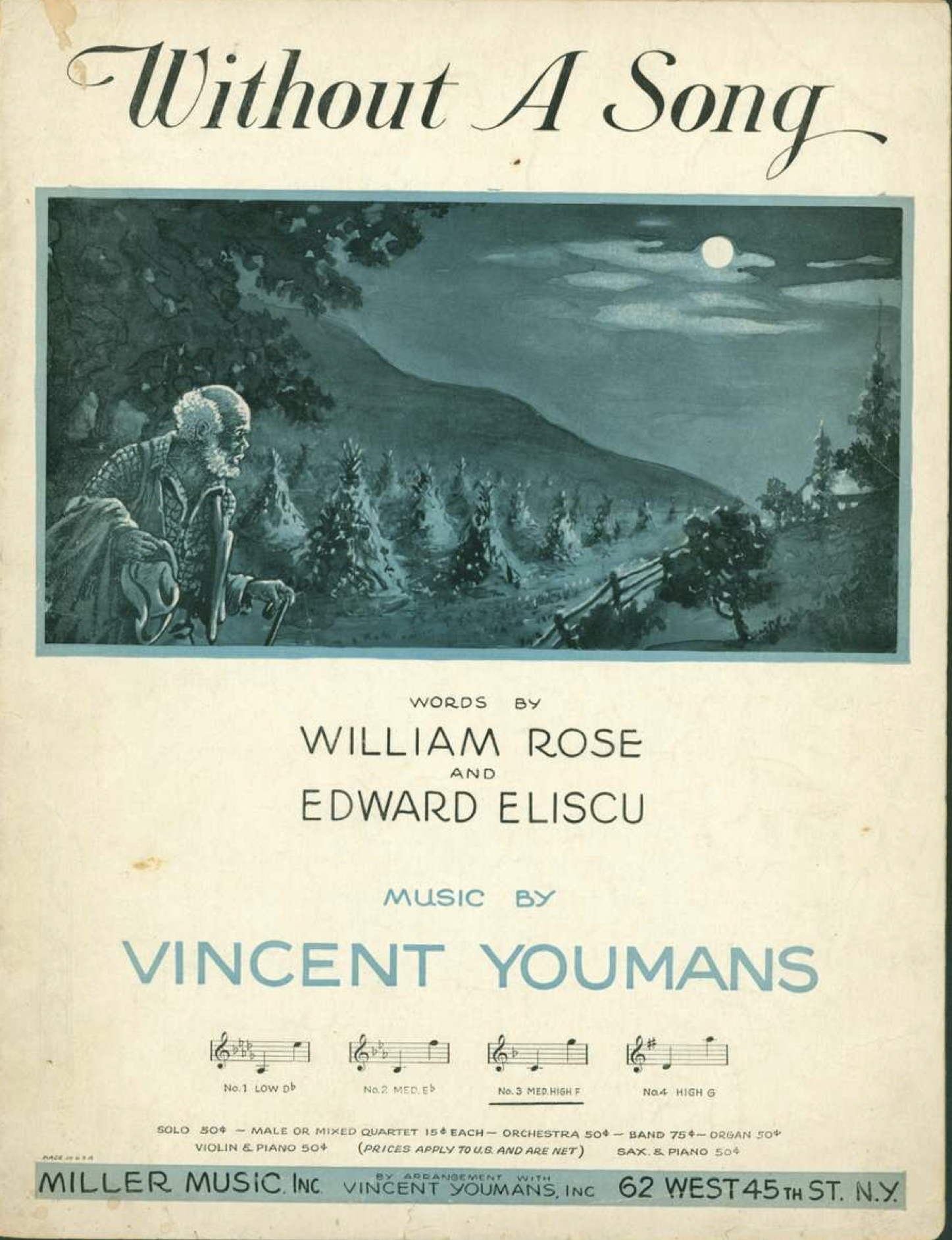

Song

from the album Great Day (musical)
- Released: 1929
- Genre: pop
- Songwriters: Vincent Youmans; Billy Rose; Edward Eliscu

"Without a Song" is a popular song composed by Vincent Youmans with lyrics later added by Billy Rose and Edward Eliscu, published in 1929. It was included in the musical play, Great Day. The play only ran for 36 performances but contained two songs which became famous, "Without a Song" and "Great Day".

== Background and initial recordings ==
- Canadian singer, Gilbert Burgess Holland introduced “Without a Song” in the show Great Day accompanied by Fletcher Henderson's Orchestra, in the pit of the famous Park Theatre, NYC. Gilbert is the son of Reverend John Christie Holland.
- One of the earliest recordings of the song was by Paul Whiteman's orchestra featuring Bing Crosby on 9 October 1929 and this reached the charts of the day.
- "Without a Song" was recorded in March 1946 in New York by Billy Eckstine, who later rerecorded the song live on 30 August 1960 at the Cloud Nine Lounge of the New Frontier Hotel in Las Vegas for his album No Cover, No Minimum.
- "Without a Song" also was recorded twice by Perry Como: the first time on 11 January 1951, and the second time in June 1970 at a live performance at the International Hotel, Las Vegas, Nevada. The 1951 recording was issued as a 78 rpm single in the United States by RCA Victor Records (catalog number 20-4033) and in the United Kingdom by His Master's Voice (catalog number B-10093). It was also included in a 1957 album, Dream Along With Me (RCA Camden catalog number CAL-403). The 1970 recording was issued on albums by RCA and its United Kingdom, Netherlands, and Japan subsidiaries, but not as a single. Bob Dylan has called Como's version "... just downright incredible. There is nothing small you can say about it. The orchestration alone can knock you off your feet."

== Other notable recordings ==
Lawrence Tibbett, Nelson Eddy and Frank Sinatra recorded versions of the song with what appears to be the original lyrics, including the line, "A darkie's born, but he's no good no how, without a song." In subsequent recordings, Sinatra didn't use the term "darkie", and later recorded versions included the altered text "a man is born, but he's no good no how, without a song." The original was played in error on BBC Radio 4's PM program on 9 April 2020, prompting an apology on the same program four days later.

In addition to popular artists like Bing Crosby, Perry Como, Frank Sinatra, Tony Bennett, John Gary, Keely Smith and Neil Sedaka, and opera singers like Lauritz Melchior, Jan Peerce and Mario Lanza, many African-American artists of varying styles also successfully recorded the song after Billy Eckstine first did so in 1946, including a version in "gospel style" by Mahalia Jackson in concert in Berlin, 1967; also versions by Ray Charles, George Benson, The Ravens, Roy Hamilton, The Isley Brothers, Stevie Wonder, The Supremes (for their album I Hear A Symphony), and jazz singer Jimmy Scott on his 2006 album Milestone Profiles - Jimmy Scott on Milestone Records. Billy Preston recorded a version for his 1971 album I Wrote A Simple Song, but two years earlier, while working with the Beatles, he improvised it with John Lennon and Ringo Starr and this recording was ultimately included in 2021 on Let It Be: Special Edition and heard during the end credits of episode two of Peter Jackson's The Beatles: Get Back documentary. Instrumental versions have been recorded by Sonny Rollins, on his 1962 "comeback" album, The Bridge, Stanley Turrentine on his album Never Let Me Go (Blue Note 90838), Clare Fischer on Surging Ahead (Pacific Jazz PJ 67), and Bill Evans on You Must Believe in Spring (reissued on Rhino Records). Others include Oscar Peterson, Louis Armstrong, Art Blakey, Art Tatum, Joe Henderson, Freddie Hubbard, Art Pepper, Nana Mouskouri and Adam Rogers.

Al Jolson sang "Without a Song" on request from Oscar Levant, and as the show's closing number, on the CBS Kraft Music Hall radio program, on 21 October 1948, accompanied by Lou Bring and His Orchestra and Chorus.

James Cleveland and the Cleveland Singers recorded "Without a Song" on the Savoy Records label in 1965, its much-loved gospel rendition that features Cleveland's powerful lead complemented by striking vocal harmonies.

"Without a Song" was released as a single in the UK by Gary Shearston in 1974 and by Noah Stewart in 2011.

The Carpenters included a partially a cappella rendition of “Without a Song” in their 1980 TV special The Carpenters: Music, Music, Music.

Willie Nelson used it as the title track of a 1983 album.
