= Horizon (The Carpenters album) =

Studio album by the Carpenters
- Released: June 6, 1975
- Recorded: September 1974 – April 1975
- Studios: A&M Studios, Hollywood
- Genre: Pop
- Length: 34:53
- Label: A&M
- Producer: Richard Carpenter/Associate Producer - Karen Carpenter

The Carpenters chronology
Live in Japan (1975)	Horizon (1975)	A Kind of Hush (1976)

Singles from Horizon
- 1. "Please Mr. Postman" Released: November 29, 1974 (UK); 2. "Love Me for What I Am" Released: 1975 (Philippines Release Only); 3. "Only Yesterday" Released: March 14, 1975; 4. "Solitaire" Released: July 18, 1975

Horizon is the sixth studio album by the American musical duo the Carpenters. It was recorded at A&M Studios (mainly in Studio "D", using then state-of-the-art 24-track recording technology, Dolby, and was recorded at 30 inches per second). The Carpenters spent many hours experimenting with different sounds, techniques and effects.

After five consecutive albums having peaked inside the US top five, Horizon broke this run by only reaching no. 13. The album has been certified Platinum by the RIAA for shipments of 1 million copies. It was particularly successful in the United Kingdom and Japan, topping the charts and becoming one of the best-selling albums of 1975 in both those countries. Horizon also reached no. 3 in New Zealand, no. 4 in Canada and no. 5 in Norway.

== Overview ==
The album's first single, "Please Mr. Postman" (released some seven months earlier), became the album's biggest hit single and the Carpenters' biggest hit single worldwide. It reached no. 1 in the United States, Australia, New Zealand, Canada, and South Africa, no. 2 in the UK and Ireland. This tune features Karen on drums and Tony Peluso on guitar solo. The following single, "Only Yesterday," was also a success, reaching no. 2 in Canada and France, no. 4 in the US, no. 5 in Ireland, no. 7 in the UK, no. 10 in New Zealand, and was certified gold in Japan. The song also won the prestigious Grand Prix award in Japan. A third single, "Solitaire," reached no. 17 in the US and the top 40 in several other countries worldwide. According to Richard, Karen never particularly liked the song. The Carpenters' version of this song leaves out lyrics included in the original.

"Desperado" was initially recorded by the Eagles in 1973 for the album of the same name. Several others have recorded this song, including Linda Ronstadt, Bonnie Raitt and Kenny Rogers, but A&M decided not to release the song as a single. Another cover, "I Can Dream, Can't I," is an interpretation of the 1949 Andrews Sisters hit and was written in 1937. Karen and Richard hired Billy May, who had worked with artists like Frank Sinatra and Nat King Cole, to help orchestrate the song. The song features the Billy May Orchestra. John Bahler is in the chorus of background singers.

At the time of the release of Horizon, lyricist John Bettis claimed "(I'm Caught Between) Goodbye, and I Love You" to be his and Richard's best collaboration.

== Reception ==
Professional ratings
Review scores
Source	Rating
AllMusic	2/5 stars
MusicHound Lounge	2/5 stars
Rolling Stone	(Positive)
The Rolling Stone Album Guide	2.5/5 stars

Rolling Stone reviewer Stephen Holden acclaimed Horizon, calling it "the Carpenters' most musically sophisticated album to date" and noting that "while not an emotionally compelling singer, Karen Carpenter has developed into a fine vocal technician, whose mellow interpretations of the Eagles' "Desperado" and Neil Sedaka's "Solitaire" evidence professionalism on a par with such Fifties stars as Jo Stafford and Rosemary Clooney. Richard Carpenter has also become a highly skilled producer/arranger of easy-listening music. Against the carefully structured sound of the Carpenter formula, wherein Karen's solos burst in and out of diaphanous multiharmonies, Richard has imposed more elaborately orchestrated textures than before and wisely mixed them at a level that doesn't distract attention from Karen's intimately mixed singing."

Billboard noted that "the grand eloquent sound of their superb backup arrangements gives this act a special launching pad to catapult its vocal sound. Karen's strong and positive voice melds into her lyrics, be they on a now well-known work ("Please Mister Postman" and "Only Yesterday ") or an old evergreen like "I Can Dream Can't I." Karen's soft qualities plus her blending with brother Richard into an omnidirectional attack provide easy to listen to the material."

In their review, Cashbox praised the album, stating that "the natural vocals of Karen and the arranging genius of Richard have combined to make the Carpenters' sound a classic in the easy listening market. This successful musical formula continues on "Horizons” as the Carpenters turn their finely toned talents to proven outings on "Only Yesterday” and "Love Me For What I Am..." The Carpenters once again prove themselves the listen of the century."

However, AllMusic gave the album a mixed review, noting that 'the beautifully arranged "Aurora" sets the album's ambience, however the covers, "Desperado" and "Please Mr. Postman," have the duo adding nothing new to the tracks... Although the sorrow-or-bust ethos of this might put some off, Horizon gains its strength from strong production values and Karen Carpenter's singular gifts as an interpreter.'

== Re-packaged release ==
Horizon was re-issued as a CD in 1996 by the Belgium label ARC Records (not to be confused with the American label of the same name), retitled simply The Carpenters, with the track list and running order intact but with an entirely different cover design.

== Track listing ==
No.	Title	Writer(s)	Length
1.	"Aurora"	Richard Carpenter; John Bettis	1:35
2.	"Only Yesterday"	Carpenter; Bettis	4:10
3.	"Desperado"	Don Henley; Glenn Frey	3:35
4.	"Please Mr. Postman"	Georgia Dobbins; William Garrett; Freddie Gorman; Brian Holland; Robert Bateman	2:48
5.	"I Can Dream, Can't I?"	Sammy Fain; Irving Kahal	4:46

No.	Title	Writer(s)	Length
6.	"Solitaire"	Neil Sedaka; Phil Cody	4:40
7.	"Happy"	Tony Peluso; Diane Rubin; Bettis	3:50
8.	"(I'm Caught Between) Goodbye and I Love You"	Carpenter; Bettis	3:58
9.	"Love Me for What I Am"	Palma Pascale; Bettis	3:28
10.	"Eventide"	Carpenter; Bettis	1:27

== Personnel ==
- Karen Carpenter – vocals, drums on "Please Mr. Postman" and "Happy"
- Richard Carpenter – keyboards, ARP synthesizer, vocals
- Joe Osborn – bass guitar
- Jim Gordon – drums
- Tony Peluso – guitar
- Bob Messenger – tenor saxophone
- Doug Strawn – baritone saxophone
- Earle Dumler – oboe, English horn
- Thad Maxwell, Red Rhodes – pedal steel guitar
- Tommy Morgan – harmonica
- Gayle Levant – harp
- Bernie Grundman, Richard Carpenter – remastering at Bernie Grundman Mastering

Although percussion is audible on some of the songs, notably "Only Yesterday", it is not specified who the percussionist is, but this would change with the experimental album Passage, released in 1977.

Engineers: Roger Young, Ray Gerhardt Assistant engineer: Dave Iveland

Photography: Ed Caraeff

Arranged, orchestrated and conducted by Richard Carpenter

"I Can Dream, Can't I?" featured guest performances by:

- Bass guitar: Joe Mondragon
- Drums: Alvin Stoller
- Keyboards: Pete Jolly
- Vibes: Frank Flynn
- Guitar: Bob Bain

== Charts ==
=== Weekly charts ===
Chart (1975–1976)	Peak position
Australian Albums Kent Music Report	21
Canada Top Albums/CDs (RPM)	4
Finnish Albums (The Official Finnish Charts)	15
German Albums (Offizielle Top 100)	42
Japanese Albums (Oricon)	1
New Zealand Albums (RMNZ)	3
Norwegian Albums (VG-lista)	5
UK Albums (Official Charts)	1
US Billboard 200	13
US Cash Box Top 200 Albums	10

=== Year-end charts ===
Chart (1975)	Peak position
Australian Albums Kent Music Report	78
Canada Top Albums/CDs (RPM)	40
Japanese Albums (Oricon)	8
UK Albums (OCC)	4

== Certifications ==
Region	Certification	Certified units/sales
Canada (Music Canada)	Gold	50,000^{^}
Japan (Oricon Charts)	—	228,000
United Kingdom (BPI)	Gold	100,000^{^}
United States (RIAA)	Platinum	1,000,000^{^}
^{^} Shipments figures based on certification alone.
