= The Carpenters' First Television Special =

- Genre: Music
- Written by: Rich Eustis; George Geiger; Ray Jessel; April Kelly; Jim Mulligan; Al Rogers
- Directed by: Bill Davis
- Starring: Richard Carpenter; Karen Carpenter
- Country of origin: United States
- Original language: English

Production
- Executive producer: Jerry Weintraub
- Producers: Rich Eustis; Al Rogers
- Editor: Gary Anderson
- Running time: 60 min.

Original release
- Release: December 8, 1976

The Carpenters' First Television Special was Richard and Karen Carpenter's first television special produced in the US, airing on December 8, 1976, and their second overall, following a special for the BBC five years earlier.

In the special, the Carpenters perform a variety of sketches with guest stars Victor Borge and John Denver. The special received mixed reviews.

== Segments ==
After Karen, Richard and the orchestra perform "We've Only Just Begun", they show a clip of Richard conducting the orchestra playing a different version of "We've Only Just Begun", with Karen's voice-over talking about how much Richard loves conducting orchestras. After the orchestra's finished, the Carpenters perform "Top of the World".

On top of that, Richard and Karen perform a "Spike Jones and the City Slickers" style parody version of "(They Long to Be) Close to You", beginning with a harp introduction. The duo also perform "These Are the Jokes".

John Denver and Karen Carpenter do a duet together of a medley consisting of a cleaned up version of Robert Burns' "Comin' Through the Rye" and the Beach Boys' "Good Vibrations". In parts, Denver is singing "Comin' Through the Rye", while Carpenter sings "Good Vibrations".

They do a skit about Karen's drumming talent. It begins with Richard and Karen talking about why Karen played the drums, and Karen says, "Why not!!" Then, they reminisce to the high school days, where classmate John Denver played the drums in the high school band, and Karen was stuck with the glockenspiel. They tell how Karen obtained the drums, and fell in love with it immediately. After that scene, Karen plays a medley including "Strike Up the Band" and "'S Wonderful".

In the end, the band and the orchestra combine, and perform a medley of Carpenters hits to close the show.

=== Songs performed ===
1. "We've Only Just Begun"
2. "Top of the World"
3. "Close to You (Spike Jones version)"
4. "Strike Up the Band"
5. "Poems, Prayers & Promises"
6. "Medley: Superstar/Rainy Days and Mondays"
7. "Through the Rye-Good Vibrations"
8. "Hits Medley '76"
  1. "Sing"
  2. "Close to You"
  3. "For All We Know"
  4. "Ticket to Ride"
  5. "Only Yesterday"
  6. "I Won't Last a Day Without You"
  7. "Goodbye to Love"

== Reception ==
Writing for the Associated Press, Jay Sharbutt praised the special, saying that the show "is superior in writing, musical arrangements and pace, compared with other specials of this kind." He applauded the "sly, unexpected flashes of whimsy", and said that Karen "at times shows a deft touch for visual comedy."

However, David Reed in the Lexington Herald called it a "not so special special", saying that "if there are plans for any more, tonight's telecast could end them." He opined, "not even John Denver and Victor Borge can save them both from making their initial television show a disaster."

An article in the Rock Island Argus lauded Karen's talent on the drums, saying, "her first love is the rhythm section, and viewers around the country will have a rare opportunity to see her in a virtuoso drum solo" in the special.
