= Solitaire (Neil Sedaka song) =

1972 song by Neil Sedaka

Song by Neil Sedaka

from the album Solitaire
- Released: 1972
- Recorded: June 1972
- Studio: Strawberry Studios, Stockport, England
- Genre: Pop
- Length: 5:02
- Label: RCA Victor
- Songwriters: Neil Sedaka, Phil Cody
- Producer: Neil Sedaka

"Solitaire"
- German single sleeve

Single by The Searchers
- B-side: "Spicks and Specks"
- Released: February 1973
- Label: RCA Victor
- Songwriters: Neil Sedaka, Phil Cody
- Producer: The Searchers

The Searchers singles chronology
"Sing Singer Sing" (1972)	"Solitaire" (1973)	"Vahevala" (1973)

"Solitaire"

Single by Andy Williams

from the album Solitaire
- B-side: "My Love"
- Released: September 7, 1973
- Length: 4:22
- Label: Columbia
- Songwriters: Neil Sedaka, Philip Cody
- Producers: Richard Perry, Jack Gold

Andy Williams singles chronology
"Last Tango in Paris" (1973)	"Solitaire" (1973)	"Getting Over You" (1974)

"Solitaire"
- US picture sleeve

Single by Carpenters

from the album Horizon
- B-side: "Love Me for What I Am"
- Released: July 18, 1975
- Recorded: Late 1974
- Genre: Pop
- Length: 4:40
- Label: A&M; 1721
- Songwriters: Neil Sedaka, Phil Cody
- Producer: Richard Carpenter

Carpenters singles chronology
"Only Yesterday" (1975)	"Solitaire" (1975)	"There's a Kind of Hush (All Over the World)" (1976)

"Solitaire" is a ballad composed by Neil Sedaka with lyrics by Phil Cody and originally recorded by Sedaka on his 1972 album Solitaire. It uses the card game of solitaire as a metaphor for a man "who lost his love through his indifference"—"while life goes on around him everywhere he's playing solitaire". A version by Andy Williams reached number 4 in the UK Singles Chart in 1973. In 1975, the song was a U.S. top-20 single for the Carpenters.

== Early versions ==
Sedaka originally was inspired by Frederic Chopin (his favorite classical composer) for the chorus and by Roberta Flack in the verses. When he presented the tune to Cody, he came up with the words based on his recent divorce; Cody had been playing solitaire frequently as a coping mechanism. Both Sedaka and Cody considered the composition to be a spiritual experience.

Neil Sedaka recorded "Solitaire" as the title cut for a 1972 album at Strawberry Studios, Stockport, England backed by Lol Creme, Kevin Godley and Graham Gouldman while Eric Stewart engineered the session. Creme, Godley, Gouldman and Stewart would later go on to record under the name 10cc.

Appearing on 1972 album releases by both Tony Christie and Petula Clark, "Solitaire" had its first evident single release in February 1973 as recorded by the Searchers; however it was an autumn 1973 single by Andy Williams which would reach number 4 in the UK Singles Chart and afford Williams a number 1 hit in South Africa. The title cut from an album produced by Richard Perry, Williams' "Solitaire" also became a US Easy Listening hit at number 23. In 1974, Neil Sedaka's 1972 recording of "Solitaire" was included on his comeback album Sedaka's Back. Later in 1975, a live-in-concert version recorded by Sedaka at the Royal Festival Hall was issued as the B-side of "The Queen of 1964". This is the version of "Solitaire" that was released as part of Razor & Tie's 2007 Definitive Collection album.

== Carpenters version ==
The Carpenters recorded "Solitaire" for the 1975 Horizon album; Richard Carpenter, familiar with the song via the versions by Neil Sedaka and Andy Williams, was "not crazy" about the song, but he felt it would showcase Karen Carpenter's vocal expertise. Despite assessing her vocal performance on "Solitaire" as "one of [her] greatest", Richard says that, "she never liked the song [and]...she never changed her opinion."

"Solitaire" was issued as the third single from Horizon; for the single version a guitar lead was added between the first verse and chorus.

The single reached number 17 on the Billboard Hot 100 and became the duo's least successful single since "Bless the Beasts and Children" in 1971. However "Solitaire" did afford the Carpenters their twelfth of fifteen number 1 Easy Listening hits.

=== Personnel ===
- Karen Carpenter – lead and backing vocals
- Richard Carpenter – backing vocals, piano, Fender Rhodes electric piano, Hammond organ, orchestration
- Joe Osborn – bass
- Tony Peluso – guitar
- Jim Gordon – drums
- Earle Dumler – oboe

== Chart performance ==
=== Andy Williams version ===
Chart (1973–1974)	Peak position
Canada RPM Adult Contemporary	34
Ireland (IRMA)	3
New Zealand (Listener)	18
South Africa (Springbok)	1
UK Singles Chart	4
US Billboard Easy Listening	23

=== Year-end charts ===
Chart (1974)	Rank
South Africa	5
UK	52

=== Carpenters version ===
Chart (1975)	Peak position
Australia (Kent Music Report)	61
Canada RPM Top Singles	12
Canada RPM Adult Contemporary	3
Quebec (ADISQ)	47
Oricon (Japanese) Singles Chart	44
New Zealand (RIANZ)	6
UK Singles Chart	32
US Billboard Hot 100	17
US Adult Contemporary (Billboard)	1
US Cash Box Top 100	15
US Cashbox Radio Active Airplay Singles	2

=== Year-end charts ===
Chart (1975)	Rank
Canada	116
U.S. Billboard Easy Listening	40

== Other notable cover versions ==
- Clay Aiken (US #4, Canada #1, 2004)
- Tony Christie
- Jann Arden
- Iveta Bartošová ("Solitér" Czech)
- Shirley Bassey – from her album All by Myself (1982)
- Beat Crusaders
- Sheryl Crow - on the 1994 tribute album If I Were a Carpenter
- Vic Damone - from his album Now and Forever (1982).
- Gallon Drunk
- Johnny Goudie
- Sissel Kyrkjebø
- Johnny Mathis - included on his album Feelings (1975)
- Joe McElderry
- Nana Mouskouri
- Jane Olivor
- Patricia Paay (Netherlands number 24) 1983
- Elvis Presley - included on his album From Elvis Presley Boulevard, Memphis, Tennessee (1976)
- Brett Smiley
- Westlife
- Roger Whittaker
- Mark Lanegan on his 2013 album Imitations
- Josh Groban

== Different version of the lyrics ==
There are significant differences between the lyrics in the Neil Sedaka, Andy Williams and Carpenters versions. Andy Williams asked Philip Cody to rewrite the lyrics and make them more personal, perhaps reflecting his then current separation from his wife, while the Carpenters took some of the Andy Williams changes but elsewhere kept Phil Cody's original lyrics. Cody has said he now prefers the Carpenters version.

== See also ==
- List of number-one adult contemporary singles of 1975 (U.S.)
