= The Carpenters: Music, Music, Music =

- Genre: Music
- Written by: Rod Warren
- Directed by: Bob Henry
- Starring: Karen Carpenter; Richard Carpenter; John Davidson; Ella Fitzgerald; Ken Grant; Nelson Riddle
- Country of origin: United States
- Original language: English

Production
- Executive producer: Jerry Weintraub
- Producer: Bob Henry
- Editor: Terry Climer
- Running time: 60 min
- Production company: Downey-Bronx Productions

Original release
- Release: 16 May 1980

The Carpenters: Music, Music, Music is a Carpenters television special from 1980. It included guest stars such as Ella Fitzgerald, John Davidson and Nelson Riddle and his orchestra.

== Music ==
1. "A Song For You" – Karen Carpenter, Richard Carpenter
2. "Without a Song" – Karen, Richard, Ella and John
3. "I Got Rhythm Medley" – Karen, Richard and other dancers
  "I Got Rhythm"
  "'S Wonderful"
  "Rhapsody in Blue"
  "Fascinating Rhythm
4. "Ain't Misbehavin'" – Ella Fitzgerald
5. "Dizzy Fingers" – Richard Carpenter
6. "You'll Never Know" – John Davidson
7. Medley:
  "This Masquerade" – Karen and Ella
  "My Funny Valentine" – Karen
  "I'll Be Seeing You" – Ella
  "Someone to Watch Over Me" – Karen
  "As Time Goes By" – Ella and Karen
  "Don't Get Around Much Anymore" – Karen and Ella
  "I Let a Song Go Out of My Heart" – Karen and Ella
8. Piano Solo – Richard Carpenter
9. "When I Fall in Love" – Karen Carpenter
10. "You're Just in Love" – Karen and John
11. "How High The Moon / Smoke Gets In Your Eyes / Jazz Scat" – Ella Fitzgerald
12. 1980 Carpenters Medley – Karen and Richard, Nelson Riddle and his Orchestra:
  "Sing"
  "Knowing When To Leave"
  "Make It Easy On Yourself"
  "Someday"
  "We've Only Just Begun"

== Later releases ==
A number of tracks from the TV Special were released on posthumous Carpenters albums: "When I Fall in Love" (Lovelines), "Without a Song", "I Got Rhythm Medley", "Dizzy Fingers", "You're Just in Love", "Karen/Ella Medley" (As Time Goes By).
