= Only Yesterday (song) =

- Cover to the single "Only Yesterday"

Single by the Carpenters

from the album Horizon
- B-side: "Happy"
- Released: March 14, 1975
- Recorded: January 30, 1975
- Length: 4:10 (album version); 3:50 (single version)
- Label: A&M; 1677
- Songwriters: Richard Carpenter, John Bettis
- Producer: Richard Carpenter

The Carpenters singles chronology
"Santa Claus Is Comin' to Town " (1974)	"Only Yesterday" (1975)	"Solitaire" (1975)

Music video
- "Only Yesterday" on YouTube

"Only Yesterday" is a song recorded by the Carpenters. Released on March 14, 1975, it was composed by Richard Carpenter and John Bettis. The song peaked at number four on the Billboard Hot 100 and number one on the Adult Contemporary (AC) charts, the Carpenters' eleventh number one on that chart.

Cash Box called the song a "ballad with its infectious beat" and that "Karen's dulcet, multi-tracked vocals soar over a dynamic arrangement which should be buzzing over the airwaves for a long time." It was The Carpenters' twelfth and last top-ten single on the Billboard Hot 100—though they would have nine more top-ten singles on the AC charts, ending with AC number seven "Make Believe It's Your First Time", a few months after Karen's death in 1983.

The music video features some footage of Karen and Richard at work in the studio. After Karen sang the line, "the promise of morning light", it faded from the studio to a fountain in Huntington Library Gardens in San Marino, California. The video then featured some footage of a red moon bridge, which was roped off to the general public, in the Japanese Garden at Huntington Library.

== Personnel ==
- Karen Carpenter – lead and backing vocals
- Richard Carpenter – backing vocals, piano, Wurlitzer electronic piano, Fender Rhodes electric piano, orchestration
- Joe Osborn – bass guitar
- Tony Peluso – guitar
- Jim Gordon – drums
- Bob Messenger – tenor saxophone
- Earle Dumler – oboe
- Uncredited – percussion

== Charts ==
=== Weekly charts ===
Chart (1975)	Peak position
Australia (Kent Music Report)	16
Canada Top Singles (RPM)	2
Canada RPM Adult Contemporary	2
Ireland (IRMA)	5
Oricon International Singles Chart	1
Oricon (Japanese) Singles Chart	12
New Zealand	10
Quebec (ADISQ)	4
UK Singles Chart	7
US Billboard Hot 100	4
US Billboard Adult Contemporary	1
US Cash Box Top 100	8
West Germany (GfK)	43

=== Year-end charts ===
Chart (1975)	Rank
Brazil (Brazilian Radio Airplay)	20
Canada RPM Top Singles	59
Canada RPM Adult Contemporary	15
New Zealand	33
US Billboard Hot 100	94

== See also ==
- List of number-one adult contemporary singles of 1975 (U.S.)

== Bibliography ==
- The Billboard Book of Top 40 Hits, 6th Edition, 1996
