= Little Neutrino =

Song by Klaatu

from the album 3:47 EST
- Released: 1976
- Recorded: 18 October 1974
- Genre: Space rock; progressive rock; baroque pop; psychedelic pop
- Length: 8:13
- Label: Daffodil, Capitol
- Songwriter(s): Dee Long
- Producer(s): Terry Brown

"Little Neutrino" is a track written by Dee Long, from the album 3:47 EST by the progressive rock group Klaatu.

== Recording ==
On October 18, 1974 a Gibson 12-string acoustic guitar was recorded using a detuned tape delay. Subsequently, the acoustic guitar was double-tracked. In the initial recording session, a Moog synthesizer was used to simulate the sound of a flute.

The sound effects on "Little Neutrino" were recorded by Klaatu's producer, Terry Brown.

The song's unique vocal distortion is a result of an artificial larynx, which was used by the track's writer, Dee Long to "mouth" the track's lyrics.

The original version of "Little Neutrino" was a 16-track recording. The recording was subsequently transferred to the 24-track tape format in March 1975.

== Release ==
"Little Neutrino" was first released on August 11, 1976. It was the closing track on Klaatu's debut album, 3:47 EST.

A previously unreleased vocal mix of the track appears as part of the Klaatu box set, Sun Set.

There are two known live versions of this track. The first was performed by the reunited members of Klaatu, during their 2005 reunion. It can be heard on Klaatu's 2009 compilation, Solology. Former Klaatu member, Dee Long, also performed a version of "Little Neutrino", which appears on his solo album, "Long Live And Prosper".

== Personnel ==
- Dee Long – vocals, acoustic guitar, electric guitar, Moog synthesizer
- John Woloschuk – synthesizer
- Terry Draper – drums, tympani, cymbals
- Terry Brown – sound effects
