= 3:47 EST =

1976 studio album by Klaatu

Studio album by Klaatu
- Released: August 11, 1976
- Recorded: January 1, 1973 – August 1975
- Genres: Progressive rock; psychedelic pop; space rock
- Length: 36:36
- Labels: Daffodil, Capitol
- Producers: Terry Brown, Klaatu

Klaatu chronology
3:47 EST (1976)	Hope (1977)

Singles from 3:47 EST
- 1. "Calling Occupants" / "Sub-Rosa Subway" Released: 1976

3:47 EST is the debut album by the Canadian progressive rock group Klaatu, released in August 1976. The album was renamed Klaatu when released in the United States by Capitol Records. The album is notable for its Beatlesque psychedelia. The Juno-nominated album cover was painted by a friend of Klaatu's members, a Canadian graphic artist, Ted Jones.

Rumours spread in the wake of the album's release that Klaatu were, in fact, a secretly reunited Beatles. The album was moderately successful in the United States, largely as a result of the Beatles rumours. Capitol Records seized the opportunity by giving elusive answers to press inquiries regarding the rumour, which further fueled media attention and publicity.

A remastered version of the album was released on Klaatu's indie record label Klaatunes in 2011. To accompany this release, a music video was made for the remastered version of "Calling Occupants".

Professional ratings
Review scores
Source	Rating
Dave Sleger, Allmusic (Klaatu/Hope two-in-one)	4/5 stars
Peter Kurtz, Allmusic	3/5 stars

== Origin of the title ==
In the 1951 science fiction film The Day the Earth Stood Still, the alien emissary Klaatu arrives in Washington, D.C. at 3:47 in the afternoon Eastern Standard Time. According to a 1981 issue of the group's newsletter, "one of the band's member[s] viewed a screening ... and was immediately impressed by the appropriateness of the character Klaatu's arrival time on earth as the title of the band Klaatu's debut record album".

== Musical style ==
AllMusic's Dave Sleger said "Klaatu frequently alternated between Beatlesque pop, the showy guitar rock and vocal theatrics of early Queen, and the electronic orchestral techniques pioneered by Wendy Carlos, or worked all three into the structure of a four- or five-minute song". Peter Kutz observed surf music, '70s progressive rock, and children's novelty song on the album. Pitchfork described the album as "a wonderfully weird cross-section of Beatles-esque psych pop and '70s prog".

Goldmine called the album a collection of "well-produced pop-rock songs", and noted similarities to the Beach Boys, Pink Floyd, Moody Blues, King Crimson, and the Beatles. MusicHound, in its guide to rock music, observed baroque pop arrangements.

== Track listing ==
Side 1
No.	Title	Writer(s)	Length
1.	"Calling Occupants of Interplanetary Craft"	John Woloschuk, Terry Draper	7:10
2.	"California Jam"	Woloschuk, Dino Tome	3:03
3.	"Anus of Uranus"	Dee Long	3:18
4.	"Sub-Rosa Subway"	Woloschuk, Tome	4:34

Side 2
No.	Title	Writer(s)	Length
5.	"True Life Hero"	Long	3:24
6.	"Doctor Marvello"	Woloschuk	3:34
7.	"Sir Bodsworth Rugglesby III"	Woloschuk	3:26
8.	"Little Neutrino"	Long	8:07
Total length:			36:36

The album ends with a mouse squeak. Their following album, Hope, begins with a mouse squeak. CDs that feature both albums on one disc omit one of these squeaks.

== Personnel ==
The first pressing, and most reissues of this album, do not list the names of the band members.

Klaatu

- John Woloschuk – vocals, piano, organ, mellotron, acoustic guitar, bass guitar, synthesizers, percussion
- Dee Long – vocals, electric and acoustic guitars, electric sitar, synthesizers, ukulele, mellotron
- Terry Draper – drums, percussion, tympani, vocals

Additional musicians

- Doug Riley – orchestral arrangements, xylophone on "Sir Bodsworth Rugglesby III"
- Vern Dorge – chimes on "Sub Rosa Subway"
- Bruce Cassidy – trumpet on "Doctor Marvello"
- Dave Kennedy – guitars on "California Jam"
- Raymond Gassi – backing vocals on "California Jam"

Production

- Produced by Terry Brown & Klaatu
- Recorded & engineered by Steve Vaughn & Terry Brown
- Tape operators: Brian Bell & Paul Barker

== Charts ==
Chart (1976–77)	Peak position
Austrian Albums (Ö3 Austria)	17
Canada Top Albums/CDs (RPM)	40
German Albums (Offizielle Top 100)	35
US Billboard 200	32

== Certifications ==
Region	Certification	Certified units/sales
Australia (ARIA)	Gold	20,000^{^}
Canada (Music Canada)	Gold	50,000^{^}
^{^} Shipments figures based on certification alone.
