= Sub-Rosa Subway =

Single by Klaatu

from the album 3:47 EST
- A-side: "Calling Occupants of Interplanetary Craft"
- Released: August 1976
- Recorded: January–March 1973 (single version); April 1975 (album version)
- Genre: Power pop; psychedelic pop
- Length: 4:37
- Label: Daffodil, Capitol
- Songwriters: John Woloschuk; Dino Tome
- Producer: Terry Brown

"Sub-Rosa Subway" is a song by the Canadian rock band Klaatu, from their album 3:47 EST, describing the efforts of Alfred Ely Beach to create the Beach Pneumatic Transit, the New York City Subway's precursor. His work is described as secretive (hence sub rosa). The song peaked at No. 62 on the Billboard Hot 100 chart in 1977.

Two minutes and fifty seconds into the song, a long message in Morse code plays in the background. John Woloschuk, in an article in the fan magazine The Morning Sun, finally provided a translation of the code:

"From Alfred, heed thy sharpened ear — A message we do bring — Starship appears upon our sphere — Through London's sky come spring."

The harpsichord sound on the song was created by recording a tack piano with the tape recorder running at half-normal speed.

== Charts ==
| Chart (1977) | Peak position |
|---|---|
| U.S. Billboard Hot 100 | 62 |
| U.S. Cash Box Top 100 | 57 |
| U.S. Record World Singles Chart | 73 |

== Personnel ==
Album version

- John Woloschuk – lead vocals, backing vocals, keyboards, bass guitar, percussion
- Dee Long – backing vocals, electric guitar, synthesizer, telegraphy
- Terry Draper – drums
- Vern Dorge – chimes

Single version

- John Woloschuk – lead vocals, keyboards, bass guitar, maracas, bongos
- Dee Long – electric guitar, synthesizer, telegraphy
