= Move =

Move or The Move may refer to:

== Brands and enterprises ==
- Move (company), an American online real estate company
- Move (electronics store), a defunct Australian electronics retailer
- Daihatsu Move, a Japanese car
- PlayStation Move, a motion controller for the PlayStation 3

== Government and politics ==
- Emigration
- Immigration
- MOVE (Hungary), or Hungarian National Defence Association, a 1919–1945 fascist group
- MOVE (Philadelphia organization), an activist organization founded in 1972

== Science and technology ==
- Motion (physics)
- Move (game theory), an element of game strategy
- Move α, a linguistics concept developed by Noam Chomsky
- move (command), a shell command
- Move, a state transition of a finite state machine
- mv (Unix) (short for move), a Unix command

== Arts and entertainment ==
=== Film and television ===
- Move (1970 film), an American comedy film directed by Stuart Rosenberg
- Move (2012 film), a German comedy film directed by Dietrich Brüggemann
- Move (TV series), a 2020 American docuseries
- "The Move" (The Amazing World of Gumball), a 2014 TV episode
- The Move (Big City Greens), a 2022 episode of Big City Greens

=== Music ===
==== Groups and labels ====
- Move (also known as MOVE or MOVE BHC), an American hardcore punk band with the 2023 debut album Black Radical Love
- Move (Japanese band), a 1997–2013 Japanese group
- The Move, a 1960s British rock band
- Move Records, an Australian record label

==== Albums ====
- Move (Earl Klugh album) or the title song, 1994
- Move (Hiromi album) or the title song, 2012
- Move (The Move album) or the title song (2007 reissue), 1968
- Move (The Original Sins album) or the title song, 1992
- Move (Taemin album) or the title song (see below), 2017
- Move (Third Day album), 2010
- Move (EP), by BtoB, 2014
- Move, by Freak Kitchen, 1998
- Move, by Yoshida Brothers, 2000

==== Songs ====
- "Move" (4L song), 2014
- "Move" (Adam Port and Stryv song), 2024
- "Move" (CSS song), 2008
- "Move" (Little Mix song), 2013
- "Move" (Luke Bryan song), 2016
- "Move" (The Mamas song), 2020
- "Move" (MercyMe song), 2011
- "Move" (Moby song), 1993
- "Move" (Q-Tip song), 2008
- "Move" (Taemin song), 2017
- "Move" (Thousand Foot Krutch song), 2005
- "Move (If You Wanna)", by Mims, 2008
- "Move Bitch", or "Move", by Ludacris, 2002
- "Move", by Audio Adrenaline from Sound of the Saints, 2015
- "Move", by Baker Boy from Gela, 2021
- "Move", by Beyoncé from Renaissance, 2022
- "Move", by Dance or Die, 1988
- "Move", by Denzil Best, notably recorded by Miles Davis on Birth of the Cool, 1957
- "Move", by DNCE, 2022
- "Move", by H-Blockx, 1994
- "Move", by Idina Menzel from Drama Queen, 2023
- "Move", by Inspiral Carpets from Life, 1990
- "Move", by Kris Allen from Letting You In, 2016
- "Move", by Lil Tjay from Destined 2 Win, 2021
- "Move", by Saint Motel from Saintmotelevision, 2016
- "Move", by Santana, featuring Rob Thomas and American Authors from Blessings and Miracles, 2021
- "Move", by X1 from Emergency: Quantum Leap, 2019
- "M.O.V.E.", by Keith LeBlanc from Major Malfunction, 1986
- "Move (You're Steppin' on My Heart)", by the Dreamettes from the 1981 musical Dreamgirls and the 2006 film adaptation
- "Move (Yeh Ishq Ishq)" lit. 'Move (This Love Love)', a song by Shashwat Sachdev, Reble, Sonu Nigam and Roshan from the 2025 Indian film Dhurandhar
- "The Move", by the Beastie Boys from Hello Nasty, 1998

=== Radio ===
- CFXJ-FM, formerly 93.5 The Move, a radio station in Toronto, Ontario, Canada
- Move FM, a radio station in New South Wales, Australia
- Move Radio, a brand of adult contemporary radio stations in Canada
- The Move (XM), a Sirius XM station

== People ==
- Daniil Move (born 1985), Russian auto racing driver
- Richard Move, American choreographer, dancer, and filmmaker

== Other uses ==
- The Move (American football), the NFL relocation of the Cleveland Browns to Baltimore
- The Move (Sam Fife), a nondenominational Christian group

== See also ==
- Mauve
- Migration (disambiguation)
- Moove (disambiguation)
- Motion (disambiguation)
- Movement (disambiguation)
- Mover (disambiguation)
- Moves (disambiguation)
- Moving (disambiguation)
- Prime mover (disambiguation)
- Remove (disambiguation)
- MUV (disambiguation)
