= Endangered Species (Klaatu album) =

Studio album by Klaatu
- Released: 1980
- Recorded: September–December 1979
- Genres: Rock; pop rock
- Length: 33:53
- Labels: Daffodil, Capitol
- Producer: Christopher Bond

Klaatu chronology
Sir Army Suit (1978)	Endangered Species (1980)	Magentalane (1981)

Singles from Endangered Species
- 1. "Knee Deep in Love" Released: 1980; 2. "I Can't Help It" Released: 1980

Professional ratings
Review scores
Source	Rating
Allmusic	link

Endangered Species is the fourth and penultimate album by the Canadian rock band Klaatu, released in 1980.

== Reception ==
The album was a commercial and critical failure. As a result, the band was dropped shortly afterwards by Capitol, though Capitol's Canadian division picked up the band and released their final album Magentalane in Canada only.

AllMusic described Endangered Species as a "downright ghastly pop-rock affair", and deemed its songs "dismal".

== Track listing ==
=== Side 1 ===
No.	Title	Writer(s)	Length
1.	"I Can't Help It"	Dee Long	3:41
2.	"Knee Deep in Love"	John Woloschuk, Dino Tome	3:15
3.	"Paranoia"	Woloschuk	4:12
4.	"Howl at the Moon"	Woloschuk, Tome	3:32

=== Side 2 ===
No.	Title	Writer(s)	Length
5.	"Set the World on Fire"	Woloschuk	4:16
6.	"Hot Box City"	Long	3:48
7.	"Dog Star"	Long	4:17
8.	"Sell Out, Sell Out"	Woloschuk	4:55
9.	"All Good Things"	Woloschuk	1:57
Total length:			33:53

== Personnel ==
Klaatu

- Dee Long – vocals, guitar solo on "Sell Out, Sell Out"
- John Woloschuk – vocals, bass, keyboard, guitar
- Terry Draper – vocals

Additional musicians

- Chris Bond – lead guitar, acoustic guitar, electric guitar, ARP Avatar synth guitar, backing vocals
- Leland Sklar – bass guitar
- Ed Greene – drums
- Jeff Porcaro – drums
- Gary Coleman – percussion
- Bobbye Hall – percussion
- Tom Hensley – keyboards
- Clarence McDonald – keyboards
- Richard Kerr – keyboards
- Tom Scott – saxophone and solo on "Hot Box City"
- Ernie Watts – sax
- Jim Horn – sax
- Chuck Findley – trumpet
- Rupert Perry – spoken vocals on "Sell Out, Sell Out"

== Charts ==
Chart (1980)	Peak position
Canada Top Albums/CDs (RPM)	55
