= Hope (Klaatu album) =

Studio album by Klaatu
- Released: September 1977
- Genres: Progressive rock; space rock
- Length: 40:53
- Labels: Daffodil, Capitol
- Producer: Terry Brown

Klaatu chronology
3:47 EST (1976)	Hope (1977)	Sir Army Suit (1978)

Professional ratings
Review scores
Source	Rating
Allmusic	(Klaatu/Hope two-in-one)
Classic Rock	3/5 stars

Hope is the second album by the Canadian rock band Klaatu and their first concept album. Released in September 1977, it won a Juno Award for "Best Engineered Album" and a Canadian Music Critics award for "Best Album" that same year. The album follows the loose concept of space travelers visiting a distant planet.

An alternate version of Hope was released in 2005 as part of the group's Sun Set collection of rarities. The alternate version on Sun Set includes the complete contributions of the London Symphony Orchestra, which had largely been removed from the version released in 1977. The alternate version also includes a short unreleased track, "Epilogue," which had originally been intended to be placed between "So Said the Lighthouse Keeper" and "Hope". The lyrics to "Epilogue" were printed on the inner sleeve for Hope despite the song being omitted from the album.

Hope was remastered and re-issued in 2012 by the band's members, and was released on the band's independent record label Klaatunes.

== Musical style ==
A reviewer for Julian Cope's Head Heritage described Hope as “an elaborate sci-fi prog opera, while an article in the Edmonton Journal described a “whimsical space-rock album”. Allmusic's Mike DeGagne commented that the album was "less pop-infused" than the group's previous album 3:47 EST, and contained more "progressive depth" with an "experimental sound". Peter Kurtz of the website felt that the album's conceptual rock opera theme sounded "pretentious, and in some cases like a rip-off of Queen". Billboard described the songs as ranging from "fun light pop" similar to 10cc, to "theatrical melodramas" similar to Queen, and to well-orchestrated ballads similar to the Moody Blues.

PopMatters described the song “Around the Universe in 80 Days” as a “powerful pop ballad” with a “gorgeous piano melody”, and a “fine example of effortless pop-rock craftsmanship”. It described “Prelude” as “an instrumental rock epic”.

== Artwork ==
Like the previous Klaatu album, the cover was painted by graphic artist Ted Jones. The cover shows "the Lighthouse Keeper's beam". The ruined stone plaza features the sun image from the cover of the previous Klaatu album.

== Track listing ==
Side one

No.	Title	Writer(s)	Length
1.	"We're Off You Know"	John Woloschuk	4:01
2.	"Madman"	Dee Long	2:39
3.	"Around the Universe in Eighty Days"	Long	4:59
4.	"Long Live Politzania"	Woloschuk	9:11

Side two

No.	Title	Writer(s)	Length
1.	"The Loneliest of Creatures"	Woloschuk	3:44
2.	"Prelude"	Woloschuk, Long, Terry Draper	5:44
3.	"So Said the Lighthouse Keeper"	Woloschuk	5:51
4.	"Hope"	Woloschuk	4:44
Total length:			40:53

The original release credited all songs simply to "Klaatu"; however, subsequent reissues and the band's website provided individual song writing credits.

== Personnel ==
Credits are adapted from the liner notes of the 2012 reissue and John Woloschuk's contributions to the band's website.

Klaatu

- Dee Long – vocals, electric and acoustic guitars; harmonica and electric sitar (1), clavinet and bass guitar (2), organ (2, 3), piano (3, 5), synthesizer (3), mandolin (6), slide guitar (8)
- John Woloschuk – vocals, bass guitar, piano, keyboards, acoustic guitar; electric piano (1, 4, 8), synthesizer (1, 4, 6-8), autoharp (5), organ (6, 7), harmonium (7)
- Terry Draper – drums, tambourine, triangle, percussion; whistle (6)

Additional

- Guido Basso – trumpet and flugelhorn (1)
- London Symphony Orchestra arranged and conducted by Doug Riley

Production

- Arranged and produced by Klaatu and Terry Brown
- Recorded and engineered by Terry Brown

The band members are not named on the original LP.

== Charts ==
Chart (1977–78)	Peak position
Canada Top Albums/CDs (RPM)	49
US Billboard 200	83

== Certifications ==
Region	Certification	Certified units/sales
Canada (Music Canada)	Gold	50,000^{^}
^{^} Shipments figures based on certification alone.
