= Movement =

Movement may refer to:

== Generic uses ==
- Movement (clockwork), the internal mechanism of a timepiece
- Movement (sign language), a hand movement when signing
- Motion, commonly referred to as movement
- Movement (music), a division of a larger composition or musical notes
- Social movement, a loose grouping of people
  - Political movement, one with a policy goal

== Names and titles ==
=== Literature ===
- "Movement" (short story), a short story by Nancy Fulda
- The Movement (comics), a comic book by Gail Simone and Freddie Williams II
- "Movement (운동, 運動)", a poem by Yi-sang

=== Music ===
- Movement (music festival), the Detroit Electronic Music Festival
- Movement (band), an Australian soul/ambient band
- Movements (band), an American post-hardcore band

==== Albums and EPs ====
- Movement (9mm Parabellum Bullet album)
- Movement (EP), an EP by The Fray
- Movement, an EP by BT
- Movement (Holly Herndon album)
- Movement (Joe Harriott album), or the title track
- Movement (Inhale Exhale album)
- Movement (New Order album)
- Movement (The Gossip album)
- Movements (album), by Booka Shade

==== Songs ====
- "Movement" (LCD Soundsystem song), 2004
- "Movement" (Kompany song), 2019
- "Movement" (Hozier song), 2019
- "Movement", a 1998 song by The Black Eyed Peas from Behind the Front, 1998
- "Movement", by Jamie Woon from Making Time, 2015
- "Movement", by Club 8 from Pleasure, 2015
- "Movement", by Bobby Hutcherson from Components, 1965

=== Other uses ===
- Movement (company), an American climbing gym chain

== See also ==
- Motion (disambiguation)
- Motor system
- Move (disambiguation)
- Movmnt (magazine)
- Progress (disambiguation)
- The Movement (disambiguation)
- Trend (disambiguation)
