= Magentalane =

Studio album by Klaatu
- Released: October 7, 1981
- Recorded: March – July 1981
- Studios: ESP Studios, Buttonville, Canada
- Genres: Psychedelic pop; pop rock
- Length: 34:11
- Label: Capitol
- Producer: Klaatu

Klaatu chronology
Endangered Species (1980)	Magentalane (1981)	Klaatu Sampler (1981)

Singles from Magentalane
- 1. "The Love of a Woman" Released: 1981; 2. "December Dream" Released: 1981; 3. "A Million Miles Away" Released: 1981

Magentalane is the fifth and final studio album by the Canadian rock group Klaatu.

== Recording and background ==
For their final album, Klaatu regained complete artistic control over the music, marking a return to their familiar psychedelic pop sound, after their previous album Endangered Species was essentially a product of Capitol Records’ attempt to commercialise the band, and therefore featured outside musicians playing most of the instruments heard on the record.

The advance budget for Magentalane helped make ESP Studios of Buttonville, Ontario, a professional studio in 1980. ESP was owned by Klaatu member Dee Long and partner John Jones, who both went on to George Martin's AIR Studios in London in 1985.

== Release ==
Since Capitol Records had terminated Klaatu, following the commercial failure of their previous album, Endangered Species, Magentalane was only released in Canada and Mexico, although it was reissued worldwide in 1995 on Compact Disc by Permanent Press Records.

The sound of a springing mousetrap is present on the album, followed by the sound of a mouse fleeing. According to John Woloschuk, this was intended to allow Klaatu's fanbase to know that Magentalane was likely to be Klaatu's last studio album.

== Reception ==
Professional ratings
Review scores
Source	Rating
AllMusic	2.5/5 stars

In a positive review, PopMatters called the album “a retrospective on the past 20 years of psychedelic pop”.

AllMusic's Jason Ankeny, while only giving the album a mediocre rating, praised the album for its songwriting, which it described as “vintage McCartney”. AllMusic's Dave Sleger dismissed Magentalane and the two previous Klaatu albums as "downright ghastly pop-rock affairs that lacked originality".

== Track listing ==
Side one
No.	Title	Writer(s)	Length
1.	"A Million Miles Away"	John Woloschuk	3:39
2.	"The Love of a Woman"	Woloschuk	3:23
3.	"Blue Smoke"	Woloschuk, Dino Tome	4:41
4.	"I Don't Wanna Go Home"	Woloschuk	2:51
5.	"December Dream"	Woloschuk, Terry Draper	4:20

Side two
No.	Title	Writer(s)	Length
1.	"Magentalane"	Woloschuk, Tome	2:35
2.	"At the End of the Rainbow"	Dee Long	3:30
3.	"Mrs. Toad's Cookies"	Woloschuk, Tome	3:06
4.	"Maybe I'll Move to Mars"	Long	5:15
5.	"Magentalane (...it feels so good)"	Woloschuk, Tome	0:56

Notes

- The album ends with a mouse squeak. On some releases, this is a separate unlisted track titled "End".

== Personnel ==
Klaatu

- John Woloschuk - vocals, piano, acoustic guitar, keyboards, bass guitar, vibraphone, electric sitar, ocarina, glockenspiel
- Dee Long - vocals, electric guitar, mandolin, slide guitar, Korg synthesizer
- Terry Draper - drums, percussion, Polymoog synthesizer, trombone, tambourine, vocals

Additional musicians

- John Johnson (saxophone), Memo Acevedo (conga) on track 2
- Adele, Paul and Dick Armin - strings on tracks 2, 5 and 9
- George Bertok - piano on track 3
- Lorne Grossman (tympani and chimes), Paul Irvine (trumpet and trombone) on tracks 5 and 9
- Jill Vogel, Anna Draper and Linda Davies - backing vocals on track 8
- Frank Watt (drums), Ken Wannamaker (bass), Dave Kennedy (guitar) on track 7

== Charts ==
Chart (1981)	Peak position
Canada Top Albums/CDs (RPM)	26
