= Mover =

Mover or movers may refer to:

- Motion (parliamentary procedure), in parliamentary procedure, the person who introduces a motion
- Moving company, a service which helps with packing, moving and storage
- People mover, a type of mass-transit
- Prime mover (disambiguation)
- Unmoved mover, a philosophical concept of that which moves all but is unmoved by everything else

== Persons with the surname ==
- Bob Mover (born 1952), American saxophonist
- Emilie Mover, Canadian singer-songwriter
- Jonathan Mover, American drummer
- Franz Karl Movers (1806–1856), German theologian

== See also ==
- The Mover, 2018 drama film
- The Movers, upcoming thriller film
- Motion (physics), the concept of a change in position of an object with respect to time
- Move (disambiguation)
- Moves (disambiguation)
- Moving (disambiguation)
