= Sir Army Suit =

Studio album by Klaatu
- Released: August 1978
- Studio: Sounds Interchange
- Genre: Pop; rock; psychedelia
- Length: 36:05
- Label: Daffodil, Capitol
- Producer: Terry Brown

Klaatu chronology
Hope (1977)	Sir Army Suit (1978)	Endangered Species (1980)

Singles from Sir Army Suit
- 1. "Dear Christine" Released: 1978; 2. "Juicy Luicy" Released: 1979; 3. "A Routine Day" Released: 1979

Professional ratings
Review scores
Source	Rating
Allmusic	link

Sir Army Suit is the third album recorded by the Canadian rock band Klaatu.

== Release ==
Despite aggressive promotion by Capitol and the band, including bandmember interviews conducted by phone with live radio shows, the album suffered mediocre sales, because of fading popular interest in the band after the 1977 rumor about the band being the Beatles recording anonymously was dispelled. With Sir Army Suit, the band began to reveal their images to the public, first in the album's artwork, then in March 1979 with an animated music video depicting the musicians in caricature. The video was broadcast on March 10, 1979 on Don Kirshner's Rock Concert.

A newly remastered deluxe edition of the album was released on 31 October 2013 via the band's own independent record label "Klaatunes". This re-issue includes a bonus DVD containing animated music videos for "A Routine Day", "Everybody Took A Holiday", "Tokeymor Field" and "Perpetual Motion Machine", plus an hour-long interview with the three band members: Terry Draper, Dee Long, and John Woloschuk.

== Artwork ==
This is the only original Klaatu album whose cover was not painted by Ted Jones; the cover of Sir Army Suit was painted by Ian Thomas Band keyboardist Hugh Syme, mainly known for album cover work with Rush. All three members appear on the back cover. The front cover features a self-portrait of Hugh Syme and Klaatu's previous graphic artist, Ted Jones. Other people featured on the back cover are Queen Elizabeth II, Linda and Terry Brown and Francis W. Davies.

== Musical style ==
The album focuses more on pop songs than previous Klaatu albums. Many of these songs were hold-overs from early demos the band made pre-fame and were revived because band member John Woloschuk had spent a year writing and arranging the Hope album, leaving him artistically drained. The band's other main songwriter, Dee Long, picked up the ball with many new compositions and ultimately co-produced and engineered the record while the band's regular producer, Terry Brown, was busy working with Rush and Max Webster.

According to AllMusic‘s Peter Kurtz, the album, while predominantly reflecting 1960s pop and British Invasion music, also contains elements of other musical styles including disco and heavy metal. A reviewer for Julian Cope's Head Heritage wrote that the album seemed "more of a Beatle-soundalike record" than Klaatu's debut, as if the Beatles had continued in "a parallel universe where Ringo dropped out in the early '70s and the remaining three continued to peaceably work together right through glam and metal and on up to disco (though in the Klaatu universe apparently punk never happened.)" AllMusic's Dave Steger praised the first two Klaatu albums but criticized the rest as "downright ghastly pop-rock affairs".

== Track listing ==
All songs written by Dee Long, except where noted.

Side one

No.	Title	Writer(s)	Length
1.	"A Routine Day"	John Woloschuk	3:11
2.	"Juicy Luicy"	Woloschuk	3:39
3.	"Everybody Took a Holiday"		3:00
4.	"Older"		3:17
5.	"Dear Christine"	Woloschuk	3:53

Side two

No.	Title	Writer(s)	Length
1.	"Mister Manson"		4:16
2.	"Tokeymor Field"	Woloschuk	3:29
3.	"Perpetual Motion Machine"		3:17
4.	"Chérie"		3:07
5.	"Silly Boys"	Long, Woloschuk	4:59

== Personnel ==
- Dee Long - vocals, electric guitar, acoustic guitar, drum machine, synthesizer
- John Woloschuk - vocals, piano, organ, bass guitar, acoustic guitar, bells, mellotron, synthesizer, clavinet, percussion
- Terry Draper - drums, vocals, tambourine, triangle, gong, anvil, bell tree
