= Human movement =

Human movement may refer to:

- Humanism
- Sports science
- Individual mobility
- Human migration

== See also ==
- Human
- Movement (disambiguation)
