= A Foot in Coldwater =

Canadian rock band

- Origin: Toronto, Ontario, Canada
- Genres: Hard rock, blues-rock, progressive rock
- Years active: 1970–1981
- Labels: Daffodil, Limited, Unidisc, Elektra, Anthem
- Past members: Alex Machin; Paul Naumann; Bob Horne; Hugh Leggat; Danny Taylor; Greg Fitzpatrick; John Richardson

A Foot in Coldwater, also known as AFIC, was a Canadian rock band who were active in the 1970s and 1980s.

Its original lineup of musicians included Alex Machin (vocals), Bob Horne (keyboard), Paul Naumann (guitar), Danny Taylor (drums), and Hughie Leggat (bass guitar and vocals). A Foot in Coldwater is best known for the song "(Make Me Do) Anything You Want", which was a Canadian hit single in 1972 and 1974, and which was inducted into the Canadian Songwriters Hall of Fame in 2019.

== History ==
A Foot in Coldwater was formed in Toronto, Ontario, Canada, in 1970 from three other bands. Leggat, Taylor, and Horne had been members of Nucleus and the Lords of London. Machin and Naumann were in the band Island. Together, they signed a recording contract with Frank Davies of Daffodil Records, who named the new band "A Foot in Coldwater".

In 1972, Daffodil released the band's first record album, A Foot in Coldwater. The first single off that album, "(Make Me Do) Anything You Want", reached the top 25 on the Canadian record charts. In 1973, Daffodil released the second album, The Second Foot in Coldwater. It included the moderately successful singles "(Isn't Love Unkind) In My Life" (No. 34) and "Love is Coming" (No. 27). In 1974, Daffodil released a third A Foot in Coldwater album, All Around Us. This album included a shorter version of "(Make Me Do) Anything You Want", which again made the Canadian singles chart. In 1976, Daffodil released one more A Foot in Coldwater single, "Midnight Lady". However, Daffodil had filed for bankruptcy and the band no longer had a record label. Horne left A Foot in Coldwater at this point.

In 1977, the remaining members of A Foot in Coldwater recorded a single, "Breaking Through" for Anthem Records; however, the single was a commercial failure and the band subsequently split up.

In 1988, A Foot in Coldwater regrouped for several short tours. In 1984, the heavy metal band Helix recorded their version of "(Make Me Do) Anything You Want". It is described as "a sleepy ballad" by AllMusic. In 1998, Unidisc Music reissued the first three A Foot in Coldwater albums along with a two-disc compilation album, The Very Best of A Foot in Coldwater.

== Members ==
Alex Machin: Vocals
Christopher Edward Campaign, Island, Nucleus, A Foot In Coldwater, Character, Champion, A Foot In Coldwater & Moxy.
Paul Naumann (April 8, 1952 – October 20, 2009): Guitars, occasional bass
Buttergarden, Leather, Island, Nucleus, A Foot In Coldwater, Character, Steppenwolf (1979), A Foot In Coldwater.
Hughie Leggat: Bass, guitars, occasional vocals
Lords of London, Nucleus, A Foot In Coldwater, Thunder Road, Private Eye, Leggat, A Foot In Coldwater and The Mississippi Hippies.
Bob Horne: Keyboards
Lords Of London, Nucleus, A Foot In Coldwater.
Danny Taylor: Drums, percussion, occasional vocals
Lords Of London, Nucleus, A Foot In Coldwater, Gus, Leggat, Ryan Brothers, A Foot In Coldwater.
Ron Charles McBride: Backup vocals
A Foot In Coldwater.

== Discography ==
=== Albums ===
- A Foot in Coldwater

Daffodil SBA 16012, 1972; No. 30 Canada
CD Unidisc AGEK 2158 1998

- The Second Foot in Coldwater

Daffodil SBA 16028, 1973; No. 41 Canada
CD Unidisc AGEK 2159 1998

- All Around Us

Daffodil DAF 10048, 1974; No. 10 Canada; No. 63 Year-end
CD Unidisc AGEK 2160 1998

- Breaking Through

Anthem ANR 1 1008, 1977

- Footprints Vol. 1

Daffodil DFN 665, 1983
CD BEI BEIBD 25

- Footprints Vol. 2

Daffodil DFN 666, 1983
CD BEI BEIBD 26

- The Best of A Foot in Coldwater (2CD)

CD Unidisc AGEK 2 2161, 1998

=== Singles ===
- "(Make Me Do) Anything You Want" / "Alone Together"

DFS 1017 1972; No. 33 Canada

- "(Isn't Love Unkind) In My Life" / "Deep Freeze"

DFS 1028 1972; (UK issue: Island WIP 6162, March 1973); No. 34 Canada

- "Lady True" / "In Heat"

DFS 1033 1973; No. 67 Canada

- "Love Is Coming" / "How Much Can You Take"

DFS 1040 1973; no. 27 Canada

- "So Long" / "Who Can Stop Us Now"

DFS 1046 1973

- "(Make Me Do) Anything You Want" / "Para-Dice"

DFS 1058 1974; No. 33 Canada

- "I Know What You Need" / "He's Always There (Watching You)"

DIL 1065 1974; No. 76 Canada

- "Midnight Lady" / "All Around Us"

DFS 1216-1068 1975

- "Keep A Candle Burning" / "It's Only Love"

DFS 1087 1976

- "Breaking Through" / "Play My Guitar"

ANS 002 1977

== See also ==
- Canadian rock
- Music of Canada

== Other sources ==
Japie Marais (2008-10-16). "Dinosaurdays - A Foot in Cold Water".
"Jam! Music - Pop Encyclopedia". 2008-10-16. Archived from the original on May 29, 2015.
"Canadian Bands". Canadianbands.com. 2009-12-28. Archived from the original on 2009-11-28.
