= Motion (disambiguation) =

Motion is a change in position of an object over time.

Motion(s) or The Motion(s) may also refer to:

== Law and government ==
- Motion (legal), a procedural device in law
- Motion (parliamentary procedure), a formal proposal by a member of a deliberative assembly

== Mathematics, science and technology ==
- Motion (geometry), a type of transformation in various geometrical studies
- Motion graphics, animation or digital footage that creates the illusion of motion
- Motion (software), a motion graphics software application by Apple
- Motion, the connecting rods and valve-gear of a steam locomotive

== Music ==
=== Groups ===
- Pete Nischt and the Motions, an American band
- The Motions (band), a Dutch rock band 1964–1970

=== Albums ===
- Motion (Almah album), 2011
- Motion (Calvin Harris album), 2014
- Motion (The Cinematic Orchestra album), 1999
- Motion (Lee Konitz album), 1961
- Motion (Tresor album), 2021
- Motion (EP), by the Mayfield Four, 1997
- Motion, by Almah, 2011
- Motion, by Eumir Deodato, 1984
- Motion, by Geoff Muldaur, 1976
- Motions, an EP by Jeremy Zucker, 2017

=== Songs ===
- "The Motions" (song), by Matthew West, 2009
- "Motion", by the Cat Empire from Cities, 2006
- "Motion", by Luke Hemmings from When Facing The Things We Turn Away From, 2021
- "Motion", by Khalid from Suncity, 2018
- "Motion", by Megan Thee Stallion from Megan: Act II, 2021
- "Motion", by Nas from Magic 2, 2023
- "The Motion", a song by Drake from Care Package, 2019
- "The Motions", by Dashboard Confessional from Alter the Ending, 2009

=== Music theory ===
- Contrapuntal motion, movement of two melodic lines in relation to each other
- Melodic motion, movement between consecutive notes

== Places ==
- Motion, Shasta, California, a community in the United States
- The Motion, a settlement in Newfoundland and Labrador, Canada

== People ==
- Alice Motion (born 1984), British chemist
- Andrew Motion (born 1952), English poet laureate
- H. Graham Motion (born 1964), England-born American horse trainer

== Other uses ==
- Motion (gridiron football), movement by an offensive player at the start of a play
- The Motion Lounge, a defunct nightclub in Williamsburg, Brooklyn, New York
- Motion, a 2009–2015 outdoor travel TV program on the Live Well Network

== See also ==
- Locomotion (disambiguation)
- Move (disambiguation)
- Perpetual motion (disambiguation)
- Self-motion (disambiguation)
