= The Movement =

The Movement may refer to:

== Politics ==
- The Movement (Iceland), a political party in Iceland
- The Movement (Israel), a political party in Israel, led by Tzipi Livni
- Civil rights movement, the African-American political movement
- The Movement (Australia), B. A. Santamaria's Catholic Social Studies Movement
- Movement Party (France)
- The Movement (populist group), foundation of nationalist parties led by Steve Bannon

== Other culture ==
- The Movement (literature), the English literary group
- The Movement (theatre company), the UK theatre company
- The Movement (comics), a comic book published by DC Comics

== Music ==
- The Movement (production team), an American songwriting and music production duo
- The Movement (reggae band), an American rock/reggae band
- The Movement (dance band), the house music act

=== Albums ===
- The Movement (Inspectah Deck album), 2003
- The Movement (Diggin' in the Crates Crew album), a hip-hop compilation from D.I.T.C. Records
- The Movement (Harlem World album), 1999
- The Movement (Mo Thugs album), 2003
- The Movement (Rusted Root album), 2012

=== Extended plays ===
- The Movement (EP), by Betty Who, 2013

== See also ==
- Movement (disambiguation)
