= Perpetual motion (disambiguation) =

Perpetual motion is motion that continues indefinitely without any external source of energy.

Perpetual motion may also refer to:

== Music ==
- Perpetuum mobile, music characterised by a continuous steady stream of notes, usually at a rapid tempo
- Trois mouvements perpétuels, a piano suite by Francis Poulenc

=== Albums ===
- Perpetual Motion, an album by the Dave Weckl Band
- Perpetual Motion (album), an album of classical material played on the banjo by Béla Fleck along with an assortment of accompanists
- The Perpetual Motion, a 2005 album by French progressive death metal band The Old Dead Tree

=== Songs ===
- "Perpetual Motion", a song by Anthrax from Stomp 442
- "Perpetual Motion", a song by Procol Harum from The Prodigal Stranger 1991

== Other uses ==
- "Perpetual Motion" (novella), a short story in the Viagens Interplanetarias series by L. Sprague de Camp
- Perpetual Motion (solitaire), a one-person card game
- Perpetual Motion (film), a 2005 film directed by Ning Ying

== See also ==
- Perpetuum Mobile (disambiguation)
- Perpetual Motion Machine (disambiguation)
