= Calling Occupants of Interplanetary Craft =

1976 single by Klaatu

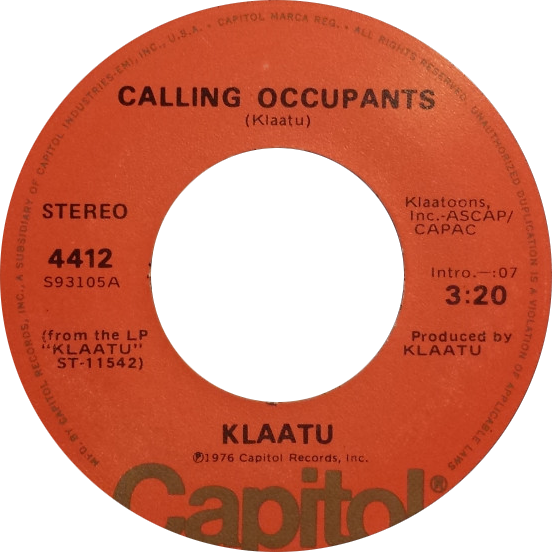
- Side A of the US retail single

Single by Klaatu

from the album 3:47 EST
- B-side: "Sub-Rosa Subway"
- Released: 1976
- Recorded: March 13 – August 1975
- Studio: Toronto Sound Studios
- Genre: Progressive rock; progressive pop; space pop
- Length: 3:23 (single edit); 7:14 (album version)
- Label: Daffodil (Canada); Capitol (rest of the world)
- Songwriters: John Woloschuk, Terry Draper
- Producer: Terry Brown

Klaatu singles chronology
"True Life Hero" (1975)	"Calling Occupants of Interplanetary Craft" (1976)	"We're Off You Know" (1977)

Music video
- "Calling Occupants of Interplanetary Craft" on YouTube

"Calling Occupants of Interplanetary Craft" is a song by Canadian rock band Klaatu, originally released in 1976 on its first album 3:47 EST. The song was played to open night-time transmission of the pirate radio station Radio Caroline. The year following its release, American soft rock duo the Carpenters covered the song, using a crew of 160 musicians. The Carpenters' version reached the top 10 in the UK and Canada, and charted at number 1 in Ireland.

In 2019, the song was inducted into the Canadian Songwriters Hall of Fame.

== Origin ==
Klaatu members John Woloschuk and Terry Draper wrote the song together, with Woloschuk assigned 75% of composer royalties because the music was mostly his work. The lyrics were written equally by both. Woloschuk said:

The idea for this track was suggested by an actual event that is described in The Flying Saucer Reader, a book by Jay David published in 1967. In March 1953 an organization known as the "International Flying Saucer Bureau" sent a bulletin to all its members urging them to participate in an experiment termed "World Contact Day" whereby, at a predetermined date and time, they would attempt to collectively send out a telepathic message to visitors from outer space. The message began with the words..."Calling occupants of interplanetary craft!"

== Charts ==
Chart (1977)	Peak position
Canada Top Singles (RPM)	45
US Billboard Hot 100	62
US Cash Box Top 100	91
US Record World Singles Chart	100

== Personnel ==
- John Woloschuk – lead vocals, backing vocals, piano, organ, synthesizer, bass guitar
- Dee Long – backing vocals, mellotron, synthesizer, electric guitar
- Terry Draper – lead vocals, backing vocals, drums, tympani, percussion
- Terry Brown – backing vocals

== Carpenters version ==
"Calling Occupants of Interplanetary Craft"
- US single picture sleeve (painted by designer Andrew Probert)

Single by Carpenters

from the album Passage
- B-side: "Can't Smile Without You"
- Released: September 20, 1977 (US)
- Recorded: 1977
- Genre: Progressive pop; space pop
- Length: 7:06 (album version); 3:59 (single edit)
- Label: A&M
- Songwriters: Terry Draper, John Woloschuk
- Producer: Richard Carpenter

Carpenters singles chronology
"All You Get from Love Is a Love Song" (1977)	"Calling Occupants of Interplanetary Craft" (1977)	"The Christmas Song (Chestnuts Roasting on an Open Fire)" (1977)

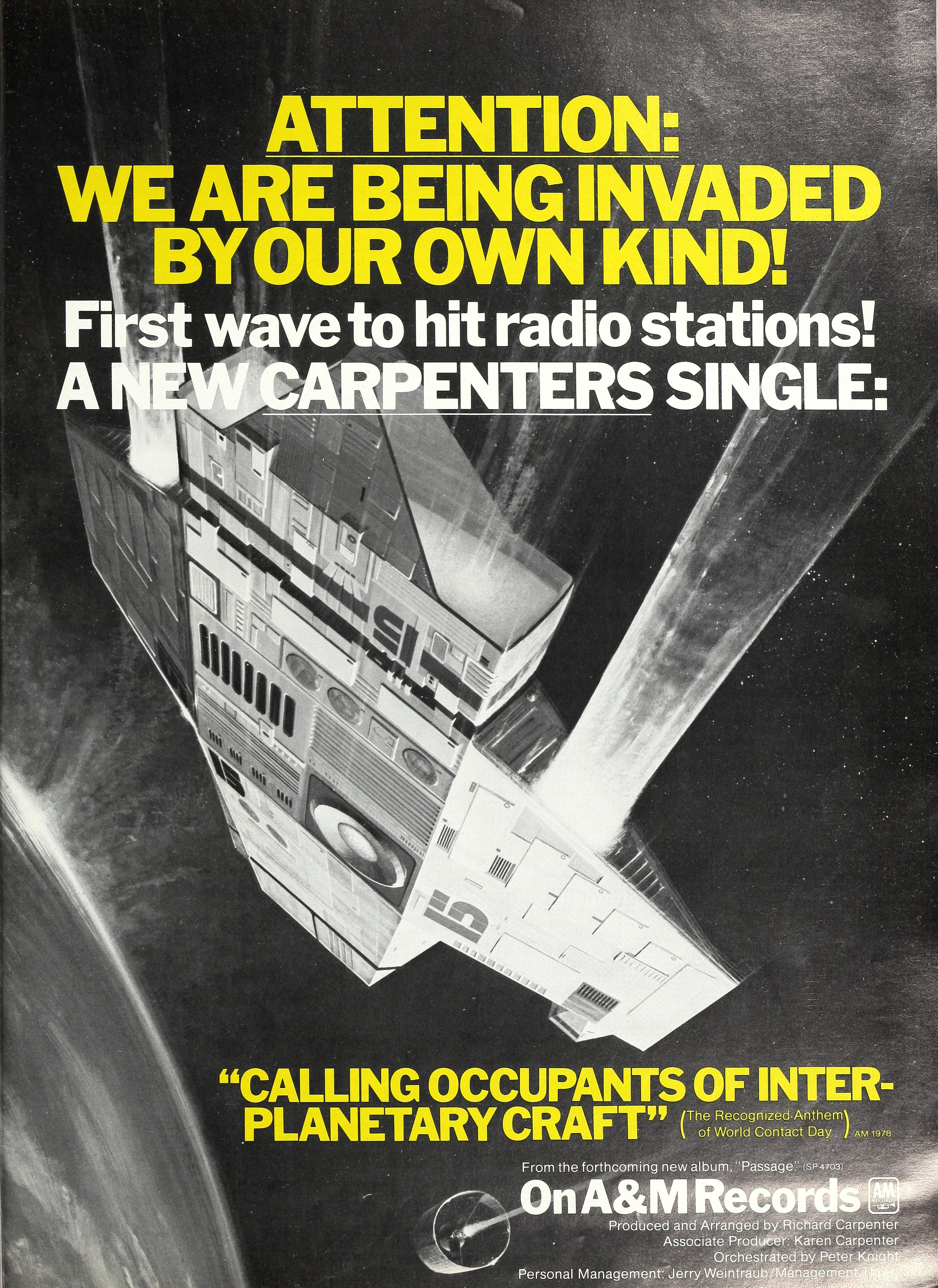
Cashbox advertisement, September 17, 1977

The Carpenters' version from their Passage album charted worldwide and appeared on several of their hits compilations. The song title appears on the Carpenters' version above the tagline "(The Recognized Anthem of World Contact Day)". The success of their version led to the duo receiving many letters from people asking when World Contact Day would be held. The song ultimately led to a successful Carpenters television special, The Carpenters...Space Encounters.

While Klaatu's original opens with various sounds of living species, the Carpenters' version opens with a radio DJ on a request show. The DJ identifies a phone caller as "Mike Ledgerwood". When the DJ asks Mike for his song request, an alien-sounding voice responds. The DJ is voiced by longstanding Carpenters' guitarist Tony Peluso, who can be seen in that role at the start of the video for the track.

The vocal melody ranges from B♭3 to G♭5. (Note: Carpenters' version is in the key signature of A♯ Major/B♭ Major; this transposition is accurate to their recording.)

The Carpenters' arrangement of the song was later copied on a sound-alike cover released on the 1977 album Top of the Pops, Volume 62.

The cover art was painted by designer Andrew Probert.

Reaching number nine in the UK Singles Chart in 1977, in a UK television special on ITV in 2016 it was voted fifth in The Nation's Favourite Carpenters Song.

=== Charts ===
==== Weekly charts ====
Chart (1977–1978)	Peak position
Australia (Kent Music Report)	13
US Billboard Hot 100	32
US Adult Contemporary (Billboard)	18
US Cash Box Top 100	23
US Cashbox Radio Active Airplay Singles	14
Canadian RPM Top Singles	18
Canada RPM Adult Contemporary	9
UK Singles Chart	9
Ireland (IRMA)	1
New Zealand (RIANZ)	19

==== Year-end charts ====
Chart (1978)	Position
Australia (Kent Music Report)	78
Canada (RPM)	160

=== Music videos ===
The Carpenters had two music videos for "Calling Occupants of Interplanetary Craft":

- Starparade – German TV, 1977; available on their DVD Gold: Greatest Hits
- Space Encounters – Carpenters' TV special, 1978; available on their DVD Interpretations

=== Personnel ===
- Karen Carpenter – lead and backing vocals
- Richard Carpenter – lead and backing vocals, piano, Hammond organ, Fender Rhodes electric piano, ARP Odyssey, orchestration
- Joe Osborn – bass
- Tony Peluso – electric guitar, DJ
- Ron Tutt – drums
- Earle Dumler – oboe
- Gregg Smith Singers – backing vocals
- Peter Knight – orchestral arrangement
- Uncredited – percussion
