= Crowbar (Canadian band) =

Canadian rock band

- Also known as: King Biscuit Boy with Crowbar
- Origin: Hamilton, Ontario, Canada
- Genre: Rock
- Years active: 1970–1975
- Labels: Daffodil Records; Epic Records; Stony Plain Records
- Past members: King Biscuit Boy; Roly Greenway; Kelly Jay; John Rutter; Ed Charron; Richard Bell; Jozef Chirowski; Larry Atamanuik; Tim Nantais; Sonnie Bernardi; Rheal Lanthier; John Gibbard; Sonny Del-Rio; Ray Harrison; John Dickie; Russell Foreman; Tim Thompson; Paul Panchezak

Crowbar was a Canadian rock band based in Hamilton, Ontario, best known for their 1971 hit "Oh, What a Feeling".

== Background ==
The band was formed in 1969. Their music was described as a mix of rousing rock, blues and boogie. They were one of the most popular Canadian touring bands of the early 1970s. They were known for their popular singles, "Oh What a Feeling" and "Million Dollar Weekend". Between 1970 and 1972, they had three albums released on the Daffodil Records label.

One vocalist that worked with the group was Pamela Marsh who had been a member of Everyday People.

== History ==
From 1969 to 1970, most of the members of the group had been a backup band for Ronnie Hawkins under the name "And Many Others". However, in early 1970, he fired them; as he later told a friend, "Those boys could fuck up a crowbar in fifteen seconds." They recorded their first album in 1970, called Official Music, as "King Biscuit Boy with Crowbar". King Biscuit Boy left the band later in 1970 but continued to appear off and on as a guest performer.

In 1971, the band recorded a performance at Massey Hall, in Toronto, which was released as a double album, Larger than Life (and Live'r Than You've Ever Been). The concert, billed as "An Evening of Love with Daffodil Records", was co-produced by concert promoter Martin Onrot and Toronto radio station CHUM-FM. Numerous guests appeared with Crowbar at Massey Hall, including members of Lighthouse, Dr. Music, and Everyday People. King Biscuit Boy also returned to perform with his former bandmates. The recording and release of the album are significant as being the first time a Canadian band had recorded and released a "live in concert" album. It was also the first time that a live concert was broadcast simultaneous on CHUM-FM.

Also in 1971, the band performed a concert in the Lord Beaverbrook Grand Ballroom in New Brunswick and entertained at the anniversary celebrations in Hamilton, Ontario.

Due largely to Margaret Trudeau's enthusiasm for the band, Crowbar was featured as the opening act of Pierre Trudeau's 1972 re-election campaign rallies, including a notable stop at Toronto's Maple Leaf Gardens. This association enhanced the band's reputation in Canada and garnered international interest from agencies such as A&M Records and figures such as Clive Davis. Despite this momentum, their second album did not capture the energy of their first and the band faltered.

Crowbar disbanded in 1975 but was revived in 1977, without Jozef Chirowski, who had joined Alice Cooper's band. The band performed intermittently during the 1980s.

More recently, Crowbar played shows around Hamilton, Ontario, including a performance at their induction into the Canadian Songwriters Hall of Fame in 2011.

== Members ==
The band consisted of numerous players in various combinations over its lifetime, including:

- King Biscuit Boy (Richard Newell) – vocals, harmonica, guitars
- Roly Greenway – bass, vocals, percussion, guitars
- Kelly Jay (Blake Fordham) (December 1, 1941 – June 21, 2019) – piano, vocals, harmonica, bass. Jay was the subject of an episode of Hoarding: Buried Alive, originally aired on April 10, 2013. He also featured on the cover of Rush's 1981 Moving Pictures album
- John Rutter – vocals (1970)
- Ed Charron – guitar (1973–1974)
- Richard Bell – keyboards (1970)
- Jozef Chirowski – organ, vocals, piano, flute, vibes, percussion
- Larry Atamanuik – drums (1970)
- Tim Nantais – bass
- Sonnie Bernardi – drums, vocals
- Paul Nicholls – guitars
- Rheal Lanthier – guitars, vocals
- John Gibbard – guitars, vocals
- Sonny Del-Rio – saxophone
- Ray Harrison – piano, Hammond B3 organ
- John Dickie – vocals (2000)
- Russell Foreman – guitars
- Tim Thompson – drums (1978)
- Rick Waites (aka Rock Watts) – bass
- Terry Branagh – guitars
- Dwayne Pack - drums
- Paul Panchezak - drums (1984,1990)

== Discography ==
=== Albums ===
Official Music (as King Biscuit Boy with Crowbar) (1970, Daffodil SBA-16001; 1996, Stony Plain) (#40 Canada)

Track listing

1. "Highway 61" – 2:47
2. "Don't Go No Further" – 3:38
3. "Unseen Eye" – 2:54
4. "I'm Just A Lonely Guy" – 2:29
5. "Key To The Highway" – 3:15
6. "Corrina, Corrina" – 4:18
7. "Biscuit's Boogie" – 9:26
8. "Hoy Hoy Hoy" – 5:20
9. "Badly Bent" – 2:05
10. "Cookin' Little Baby" – 2:25
11. "Shout Bama Lama" – 2:25

Personnel

- King Biscuit Boy – vocals, harmonica, acoustic (1) and slide (4) guitars
- John "Greyhound" Gibbard – electric and slide guitars
- Rheal "Ray" Lanthier – electric guitars
- Kelly J. – piano, percussion
- Roly Greenway – bass
- Larry Atamanuik – drums
- John R. – percussion

Bad Manors (1971, Daffodil SBA-16004) (#77 Canada)

Track listing

1. "Frenchman's Filler #1" – 1:13
2. "Too True Mama" – 2:52
3. "Let The Four Winds Blow" – 2:20
4. "The House Of Blue Lights" – 2:44
5. "Train Keep Rollin'" – 2:49
6. "Baby Let's Play House" – 3:02
7. "Oh What A Feeling" – 4:18
8. "Frenchman's Filler #2" – 0:32
9. "Frenchman's Filler #3" – 0:35
10. "Murder In The First Degree" – 5:10
11. "In The Dancing Hold" – 3:48
12. "Mountain Fire" – 3:56
13. "Prince Of Peace" – 4:07
14. "Frenchman's Filler #1" – 0:45

Personnel

- John "The Ghetto" Gibbard – lead and slide guitars, vocals
- Rheal Lanthier – lead guitar, vocals
- Jozef Chirowski – organ, vocals, piano
- Kelly Jay – piano, vocals
- Roly Greenway – bass, vocals, percussion
- Sonnie Bernardi – drums, vocals, percussion

Larger than Life (and Live'r than You've Ever Been) (1971, Daffodil 2-SBA-16007), recorded in concert at Massey Hall, Toronto (#13 Canada)

Track listing

1. "Introduction" – 0:33
2. "Prince Of Peace" – 3:37
3. "Murder In The First Degree" – 3:36
4. "Newspaper Song" – 2:36
5. "Corinna Corinna" – 4:40
6. "Fly Away" – 3:41
7. "Tits Up On The Pavement" – 7:47
8. "Mummy And Daddy" – 1:39
9. "Ask Me No Questions" – 5:46
10. "Over The Mountain" – 5:18
11. "Cane On The Brazos" – 5:15
12. "Rock Around The Clock / Shake, Rattle And Roll" – 2:05
13. "In The Dancing Hold" – 3:45
14. "Oh What A Feeling" – 8:50

Personnel

- John "Ghetto" Gibbard – electric guitar, vocals
- Rheal Lanthier – electric guitar, vocals
- Josef Chirowski – organ, vocals, piano, harmonica
- Kelly Jay – piano, vocals, harmonica, bass
- Roland "Roly" Greenway – bass, vocals, acoustic guitar
- Sonnie Bernardi – drums, vocals, percussion

Heavy Duty (1972, Daffodil SBA-16013) (#55 Canada)

Track listing
Side one

1. "Trilby" – (Kelly Jay) – 2:41
2. "Listen Sister (A Mutual Liberation Ballad)" – (Kelly Jay) – 2:07
3. "Hey Baby" – (Bruce Channel) – 2:55
4. "Dreams" – (Josef Chirowski, John Gibbard) – 2:49
5. "Where Were You" – (Kelly Jay) – 3:56

Side two

6. "Dead Head Out Of St. John's" – (Kelly Jay) – 3:45
7. "The Beaver And The Eagle" – (Kelly Jay) – 3:07
8. "Cluckie's Escape" – (Roly Greenway) – 3:10
9. "Snakes And Ladders" – (Kelly Jay) – 2:50
10. "Lay One Down" – (Roly Greenway, LOVE) 4:28

Personnel

- Rheal Lantier – lead and rhythm guitars, backing vocals
- John Gibbard – lead, rhythm and slide guitars, backing vocals
- Kelly Jay – piano, lead and backing vocals
- Josef Chirowski – organ, lead and backing vocals, piano, flute, vibes
- Roly Greenway – bass, lead and backing vocals, cowbell, tambourine
- Sonnie Bernardi – drums, backing vocals, percussion

KE32746 (1973, Epic KE-32746) (#37 Canada)

Track listing
Side one

1. "Million Dollar Weekend" – 3:04
2. "Something Happened Yesterday" – 4:20
3. "Trumpet Rose" – 3:25
4. "All The Living Things" – 3:11
5. "Go For The Throat" – 4:42

Side two

6. "Kilroy" – 2:23
7. "Rocky Mountain Tragedy" – 5:52
8. "The Killing Time Trilogy" – 7:06
  1. "Killing Time
  2. "It Really Doesn't Matter
  3. "Hard On You
  4. "Killing Time – Reprise
9. "Nothing Lasts Forever" – 3:27

Crowbar Classics: Memories Are Made of This (1975, Daffodil SBA-16030)

=== Singles ===
- 1970 "Corrina, Corrina" (Daffodil) (as King Biscuit Boy with Crowbar), #29 CAN
- 1970 "Uncle Pen" / "Roberta" (London 17385)
- 1971 "Oh What a Feeling" (Daffodil), #10 CAN
- 1971 "Happy People" (Daffodil)
- 1972 "Too True Mama" (Daffodil), #60 CAN
- 1972 "Dreams" (Daffodil)
- 1972 "Fly Away" (Daffodil), #48 CAN
- 1972 "Hey Baby" (Daffodil), #59 CAN
- 1973 "Million Dollar Weekend" (Epic), #22 CAN
- 1974 "All the Living Things" (Epic), #81 CAN
- 1977 "Run, Run Rudolph" (Puck)
