= Klaatu (band) =

Canadian rock band formed 1973

- Klaatu (2005); Left to right: John Woloschuk, Dee Long, Terry Draper

Background information
- Origin: Toronto, Ontario, Canada
- Genres: Progressive rock; psychedelia; pop; space rock
- Years active: 1973–1982, 1988, 2005
- Labels: Daffodil, Capitol, Attic, Klaatunes
- Past members: John Woloschuk; Dee Long; Terry Draper
- Website: klaatu.org

Klaatu (/ˈklɑːtuː/) was a Canadian rock group formed in 1973 by the duo of John Woloschuk and Dee Long. They named themselves after an ambassador, Klaatu, from an extraterrestrial confederation who visits Earth with his companion robot Gort in the film The Day the Earth Stood Still. After recording two non-charting singles, the band added drummer Terry Draper to the line-up; this trio constituted Klaatu throughout the rest of the band's recording career.

In Canada, the band is notable for several hits, including "California Jam" (1974), "Calling Occupants of Interplanetary Craft" (1976), and "Knee Deep in Love" (1980). In the U.S., "Calling Occupants" backed with "Sub-Rosa Subway", was a minor double-sided hit and their only chart entry, peaking at No. 62 in 1977.

Internationally, the group's pop-influenced style of progressive rock has led to them being known as the "Canadian Beatles".

== Musical style ==
Klaatu has variously been described by critics and journalists as progressive rock, psychedelic pop, pop rock, and space rock.

The band's combination of pop and progressive/art rock has often been compared to the Beatles, the guitar-rock of Queen, the electronic music of Wendy Carlos, the light pop sound of 10cc, and the orchestrated ballads of the Moody Blues and Electric Light Orchestra. British music magazine Shindig! praised the band's "otherworldly brand of progressive pop".

== Early releases ==
The band, initially a studio-only duo of Woloschuk and Long, released the singles "Anus of Uranus/Sub-Rosa Subway" and "Dr. Marvello/For You Girl" on GRT Records, in 1973, before being taken under the wing of Daffodil Records and its president Frank Davies. With Terry Draper added to the line-up, the singles "California Jam" and "True Life Hero" followed. These early singles credited Dee Long as a writer of several tunes; the others (including "Sub-Rosa Subway", "Dr. Marvello" and the hit single "California Jam") were credited to "Chip Dale," a collective pseudonym for Woloschuk and frequent co-writer Dino Tome. "California Jam" hit the Canadian Top 40, peaking at No. 36, and Klaatu, though they played no live dates, promoted their music by making a television appearance in Canada on the Keith Hampshire-hosted show Music Machine. By 1975, Davies, along with producer Terry Brown, landed the band a deal with Capitol Records in the United States.

== First three albums and Beatles rumours ==
Their first album, 3:47 EST (named Klaatu in the US as Capitol Records' executives found the original title too obscure), was released in September 1976, in North America. The band elected to include no photos, no individual musician credits, and no biographical information in the album package; all songs were simply listed as being written and published by "Klaatu." (Note that this collective writing credit covered songs earlier credited solely to Long or to the team of Woloschuk and Tome – even though Tome was not actually a member of Klaatu.) The album was met with moderately positive reviews, but by Christmas of that year, sales had stalled.

In 1977, an article published in the Providence Journal by journalist Steve Smith speculated that 3:47 EST could actually be a release by a secretly-reunited Beatles recording under a pseudonym, leading to widespread rumours. These rumours were fueled by a number of factors, including the fact that their album was released by Capitol Records (also the Beatles' label in North America), the lack of artist and producer credits or photographs in the album packaging, Klaatu's avoidance of public performances, and the fact that the group's vocal and musical style was reminiscent of the Beatles. In addition, Ringo Starr's 1974 album Goodnight Vienna had featured cover art with Starr appearing in place of the character Klaatu from the movie The Day the Earth Stood Still. The album as a whole had a Beatlesque sound. Subsequent to the Beatles rumour, the songs "Sub-Rosa Subway" and "Calling Occupants of Interplanetary Craft" became minor hits for Klaatu in 1977. "Calling Occupants" was covered by the Carpenters that same year, becoming a Top 40 hit worldwide.

While all this was happening, Klaatu were in England, recording their second album. They were somewhat aware of the situation with regard to the rumours, but did not take them entirely seriously – possibly because NME famously published an article on the Beatles-as-Klaatu theory under the title "Deaf Idiot Journalist Starts Beatle Rumour." Meanwhile, Capitol Records tried to take advantage of the rumours by issuing ambiguously worded statements that failed to make the band's identity entirely clear. The rumour was disproved when Dwight Douglas, program director at WWDC in Washington, D.C., checked the records at the U.S. Copyright Office and uncovered the band members' real names.

The band's second album Hope, released in 1977, included orchestral contributions by the London Symphony Orchestra. Sir Army Suit, their third album, is notable for the track "Silly Boys", which contains the entire lyrical portion of their single "Anus of Uranus" – a song later re-recorded as "Anus of Uranus" for their first album – backwards-masked interspersed between the "Silly Boys" lyrics. For both these releases, the band continued their policy of not including any individual names of band members in the credits, nor did they play any live shows or make any public appearances to promote these albums.

== Animated film project ==
In 1977, Al Guest and Jean Mathieson of Rainbow Animation were commissioned by Capitol Records to create an animated music video of the song "A Routine Day". This video ran on Don Kirshner's Rock Concert and subsequently played as a short in Los Angeles on the same bill as Animal House.

Following that, Guest and Mathieson got permission from Capitol Records to create a vehicle for Klaatu's songs. They wrote and directed a half-hour television special they titled Happy New Year Planet Earth, hoping that it would get yearly broadcasts as an alternative to Christmas specials. New Year's Eve was Mathieson's birthday. Again the group Klaatu was photographed and rotoscoped, with an astronaut wraparound created to connect the six Klaatu songs. Although the project was completed, Guest and Mathieson were dropped by their Canadian film investment group and wound up financing it themselves. They never released it.

In 2005, the group permitted the film to be screened in its uncompleted state at the KlaatuKon convention in Toronto. The unfinished animations were later released as part of the 2013 Sir Army Suit bonus disc.

== Later years ==
Upon the release of their fourth studio album, Endangered Species, in 1980, the band for the first time included their individual names in the album package, and the songs were now credited to their individual writers. (Subsequent re-issues of earlier Klaatu material, as well as newly published Klaatu sheet music, also gave credit to the actual songwriters of each track, rather than a collective credit.)

Although forced by Capitol to record Endangered Species in Los Angeles using established studio musicians to shore up the group's commercial chances, Klaatu continued to refuse to perform live. The album was a critical and commercial flop. The album's poor showing resulted in Capitol Records dropping the group. Now lacking a record label, Long and Draper temporarily formed a classic rock cover band with Freddy Coutts, John Jones, and John Bojicic, called FUNN, who played extensively around Toronto.

Klaatu was eventually signed by Capitol's Canadian division, EMI Canada, and released their final album, Magentalane, in 1981. This album saw the group returning to their brand of Beatles-influenced pop/rock. As a contractual obligation to Capitol-EMI in Canada, the band was forced to play their first-ever live dates and tour most of Canada to promote Magentalane. From November 1981, the group expanded to a sextet, enlisting Gary McCracken (drums), Mike Gingrich (bass) and Gerald O'Brien (keyboards) for live performances. However, in April 1982, Dee Long – never fond of performing live, by most accounts – quit the group. Although Woloschuk and Draper carried on performing for a few more months, with Terry Watkinson replacing O'Brien and Marty Morin replacing McCracken, Klaatu officially disbanded in August of the same year.

== Reunions ==
The trio very briefly reunited in 1988 at George Martin's AIR Studios in London with John Jones to record a single, "Woman," though no one was particularly happy with the results as the song was written by someone outside of the band (Paul Vincent Gunia) for the German television series Tatort. Initially Long had wanted to merely use the Klaatu name, but could not get the rest of the band's approval without their involvement. The single was released only in West Germany and did not chart, making it an extremely rare item in the Klaatu catalogue; Draper confirmed that the song was considered for a few rarities compilations, but all three band members had agreed to not include the track.

A second reunion had been attempted in 1991 to tie together with a proposed compilation release, but plans fell through after a disagreement with their distributor, BEI.

The three former members of Klaatu reunited on May 7, 2005, for a brief performance at Toronto's KlaatuKon. The set list consisted of "At the End of the Rainbow," "I Don't Wanna Go Home," "Cherie," "Magentalane," "All Good Things," and "Little Neutrino".

== Post-Klaatu ==
Klaatu's albums were released on CD format rather late, and until the 2000s several companies, including Capitol Records, released the albums with rearranged track orders. Finally, Bullseye Records, with the help of the band members themselves, released the albums in their original track listings. Bullseye also released a tribute album to Klaatu, Around the Universe in Eighty Minutes.

In 2005, Bullseye Records released a two-CD collection entitled Sun Set, which compiled a number of rarities, demos, rare early singles, and the original version of Hope which had been delivered to Capitol Records, including the complete contributions made by the London Symphony Orchestra, which had largely been removed from the original mix. The set also included a 40-page booklet including interviews with all of the former members of the band.

Bullseye Records of Canada also released Raarities in 2005, originally only in a vinyl LP format. Most of the material on the record consists of alternate mixes and single versions. A CD version, titled Solology, included the Raarities LP as well as concert recordings, and was released in March 2009.

On March 15, 2011, Klaatu announced the creation of their new record label, Klaatunes Records. The band also created an official website to go along with the new label. The label's premiere was a re-release of Solology. The band remastered their first three albums 3:47 EST, Hope and Sir Army Suit.

On May 15, 2025, Terry Draper died from leukemia at the age of 73.

== Band members ==
- John Woloschuk – vocals, bass guitar, piano, keyboards, acoustic guitar (1973–1982, 1988, 2005)
- Dee Long – vocals, electric and acoustic guitars, keyboards (1973–1982, 1988, 2005)
- Terry Draper – drums, percussion, keyboards, vocals (1973–1982, 1988, 2005: died 2025)

== Discography ==
=== Studio albums ===
- 3:47 EST (named Klaatu outside Canada) (1976 Canada No.40, US No.32)
- Hope (1977 Canada No.49, US No.83)
- Sir Army Suit (1978)
- Endangered Species (1980 Canada No.55)
- Magentalane (1981 Canada No.26)

=== Compilations ===
- Klaatu Sampler (1981)
- Klaasic Klaatu (1982)
- Peaks (1993)
- Sun Set (2005)
- Raarities (2005)
- Solology (2009)

=== Singles ===
| Year | Title | Chart positions | | | | Album |
| Year | Title | CAN RPM Top 100 | CAN RPM A/C | US Billboard Hot 100 | NLD | Album |
|---|---|---|---|---|---|---|
| 1973 | "Anus of Uranus" | – | – | – | – | Non-album single |
| 1973 | "Doctor Marvello" | – | – | – | – | Non-album single |
| 1974 | "California Jam" | 36 | – | – | – | Non-album single |
| 1975 | "True Life Hero" | – | – | – | – | Non-album single |
| 1976 | "Calling Occupants" | 45 | – | 62 | – | 3:47 EST |
| 1976 | "Sub-Rosa Subway" | – | – | 62 | – | 3:47 EST |
| 1977 | "We're Off You Know" | – | – | – | – | Hope |
| 1977 | "Hope" | – | – | – | – | Hope |
| 1977 | "The Loneliest of Creatures" | – | – | – | – | Hope |
| 1978 | "Dear Christine" | 74 | – | – | – | Sir Army Suit |
| 1979 | "Juicy Luicy" | – | – | – | – | Sir Army Suit |
| 1979 | "A Routine Day" | 84 | – | – | 44 | Sir Army Suit |
| 1980 | "Knee Deep in Love" | 52 | – | – | – | Endangered Species |
| 1980 | "I Can't Help It" | – | – | – | – | Endangered Species |
| 1981 | "The Love of a Woman" | 45 | 28 | – | – | Magentalane |
| 1981 | "December Dream" | – | – | – | – | Magentalane |
| 1981 | "A Million Miles Away" | – | – | – | – | Magentalane |
| 1988 | "Woman" | – | – | – | – | Non-album single |
