= Hoarding: Buried Alive =

American documentary television series

- Genre: Documentary
- Country of origin: United States
- Original language: English
- No. of seasons: 5
- No. of episodes: 82

Production
- Camera setup: Multi-camera
- Running time: 45–48 minutes
- Production company: Discovery Studios

Original release
- Network: TLC
- Release: March 14, 2010 – April 2, 2014

Hoarding: Buried Alive is an American documentary television series that premiered on TLC on March 14, 2010. The show follows hoarders through their life experiences and helps them learn to manage their illness.

== Overview ==
Hoarding: Buried Alive takes the viewer into the personal lives of hoarders, focusing on how the mental illness has affected the individual and his or her family members. Each episode usually looks at two different cases, examining the history of the victim and interviewing family members. The show includes an extensive look at the items each person collects. Each hoarder receives treatment from a therapist and a professional organizer. These professionals help them through the process of ridding their house of the hoard. By the end of each episode, the hoarders typically have shown signs of improvement that make the viewer hopeful for their continuing success.

== Episodes ==
=== Season 1 (2010) ===
No.	Title	Original release date
1	"Welcome to My Nightmare"	March 14, 2010
Extreme hoarders Chris of Northern Virginia and Laurie of Franklinton, Louisiana are spiraling out of control. Their possessions are destroying their relationships and transforming their homes into virtual prisons. Change will not be easy, but it's their only hope of reclaiming their lives.
2	"Beyond Embarrassment"	March 21, 2010
In a suburban Atlanta, Georgia neighborhood, Judi's hoard is so severe that she runs the risk of having her house condemned. In Falls Church, Virginia, Jim plans to abandon his hoard and is contemplating moving back with his mother, who is also a hoarder.
3	"Paralyzed by Clutter"	March 28, 2010
Extreme Omaha, Nebraska hoarder Mary is in denial while Anne of New York City fears she is passing down her compulsion to her son, Brendan. For decades, they have had trouble discarding their belongings and must get the help they desperately need.
4	"Life on Fire"	April 4, 2010
Wanda of Radford, Virginia and Ray of Menlo Park, California are extreme hoarders destined to lose their homes and live in isolation if they don't stop surrounding themselves with stuff. Making the change will be emotional and filled with anguish, but they know that time is running out.
5	"Family Secrets"	April 11, 2010
Cindy of Columbus, Ohio and Pam of North East, Maryland are both struggling with compulsive hoarding and must get a handle on the piles of possessions that plague them. They have no choice but to ask for help, or they risk losing everything that matters to them and their families.
6	"Filling the Void"	April 18, 2010
In Portland, Oregon, Charlotte and Shelly's hoarding is both a comfort and a curse. If these two women cannot find the strength to change, they risk being condemned to a lonely life where possessions replace people.
7	"No One Would Choose This"	April 25, 2010
Barbara of Spring, Texas and Michelle must get their compulsive hoarding under control or face eviction and further alienation from their families.
8	"Everything is at Stake"	May 2, 2010
For compulsive hoarders Cheryl of Southern California and Michelle of Southern Virginia, their possessions are crowding out the people they love most. If they don't change their behavior soon, they may find themselves living alone, buried by their belongings.
9	"A Million Excuses"	May 9, 2010
In Alameda, California, Mike and Kim's townhouse is on the brink of collapse under the weight of their incessant hoarding. And in Springdale, Arkansas, another man named Mike is in denial that his addiction to auctions and flea markets has crossed the line into a full-blown compulsion.

=== Season 2 (2010–2011) ===
Episodes of season 2 aired in two parts, from August 8, 2010, to October 3, 2010, and from March 2, 2011, to April 20, 2011.

No.	Title	Original release date
10	"Homeless Man with a House"	August 8, 2010
Bennie of San Francisco, California and Ronda of Dallas, Texas both have houses full of stuff and lives filled with emptiness. Decades of compulsive hoarding has driven their loved ones away. If they don't get help soon, their hopes for happiness may remain buried amid their possessions.
11	"Robbing the Kids..."	August 15, 2010
Laura of Raleigh, North Carolina has been living in cluttered conditions for the past two years, and now her home has gotten so bad that it is raising a safety concern for her three young children. And in San Francisco, California, Margaret's 20-year-old-son, Perry, has gotten so fed up with the mess his mother has created he threatens to terminate contact with her the moment he moves out.
12	"Prison of Garbage"	August 22, 2010
Deborah and Mary both started hoarding in the wake of a personal tragedy. Ever since Deborah unwillingly killed her meth-addicted boyfriend in self-defense 10 years ago, she and her now-21-year-old son, Rob, have lived amid growing piles of trash and unused possessions in their rural West Virginia farmhouse, which has become infested with bugs. 20 years ago, Mary's two-year-old son, Michael, died of heart failure, and she eventually bought her current home in North Florida when it was brand new. But as the years passed, the house became so packed, and adding to Mary's problems is her adopted six-year-old daughter, Rebecca, who has picked up her behavior.
13	"Everything's Junk"	August 29, 2010
In Ohio, Barbara has been hoarding to deal with the trauma she suffered on 9/11. As for Tommy of Los Angeles, California, he narrowly survived an aneurysm 19 years earlier, but it caused him to start hoarding. Now they both must clean up, or risk losing everything.
14	"Battle with Chaos"	September 5, 2010
Debbie of Baltimore, Maryland suffers from OCD, which has driven her hoarding. And in Illinois, Jeff doesn't believe he's a hoarder at all, but his three children think otherwise, due to his paper-filled beachfront home.
15	"How Do I Get Out of This"	September 12, 2010
Northern California native Bruce "Norski" is a local well-known skateboarder who has overcome his alcohol addiction, but has since developed an online shopping addiction. In Arizona, Linda's hoarding escalated as her marriage began deteriorating several years ago. It got worse when she filed a restraining order against her husband, Bernie, who tried to get her to clean up, and now he and their five children are threatening to leave her permanently.
16	"The Scariest Place on Earth"	September 19, 2010
Former Connecticut railroad worker Michael has been hoarding for years, but now that the local authorities are on his case, he must clean his house within six weeks or risk a trip to jail and losing his property. Meanwhile, Karen, a motivational speaker in Boston, Massachusetts, manages everyone's lives but cannot seem to manage her own condo.
17	"The Mess I've Created"	September 26, 2010
In Toronto, Ontario, Canada, Norine's hoarding forced her 17-year-old daughter, Melissa, out of the house three years earlier and now threatens to destroy their relationship. In Cleveland, Ohio, Joyce has spent years compulsively collecting, but it has taken a toll on her marriage to her husband, Roger, who narrowly survived a heart attack due to the hoard.
18	"This is Where You Sleep??"	October 3, 2010
Outside Seattle, Washington, Debbie turned to hoarding after a shocking confession ended her 25-year marriage. Meanwhile, with medical and financial problems plaguing her family, Julie fills her Minnesota home to ease the pain.
19	"Nowhere Near Normal"	March 2, 2011
After a series of failed marriages, Jahn struggles to clear her belongings from not one, but two suburban Chicago, Illinois houses before both are condemned.
20	"I Want to Cuss"	March 9, 2011
In Northern Virginia, Sharon's hoard threatens to destroy her relationship with her two sons, Dave and Steve, and her longtime friendship with her best friend, Fran, who has never known about the mess until now. And in New Haven, Connecticut, Len has filled his home with clutter, and must clear it to save his relationship with his daughter, Nina.
21	"Oh My Gosh"	March 13, 2011
In Dallas, Texas, Suzie's OCD mixed with her obsessive need to hoard, which she says stems from her cruel string of ex-husbands and former drug problems. Meanwhile, 14-year-old Vanessa lives in a cluttered suburban Milwaukee, Wisconsin home, where hoarding runs in her family. Conditions have become so bad that she and her mother, Tammy, who has a lot of critical health problems, are forced to eat their meals in the car, while Tammy's sick father, Chuck, is unable to return home from the hospital.
22	"Better Get a Dumpster"	March 16, 2011
In New Jersey, Katie's out-of-control obsession with buying clothes and accessories has strained her relationship with her 16-year-old daughter, Grace. And in Boca Raton, Florida, Domenic has just become a grandfather, but he must curb his collecting and clean his house before he can let his granddaughter see it.
23	"Overwhelming Pile of Junk"	March 23, 2011
After decades of hoarding, Debbie has not only lost the comforts of her rural Iowa home, but also the company of her four children. Chip's compulsive hoarding in Connecticut has forced his family of six to squeeze into 1,600 square feet of living space.
24	"My Biggest Embarrassment"	March 30, 2011
Jonathan's obsession with hoarding has kept his three-year-old son, Robbie, from even coming in the door of his ramshackle colonial home in suburban Boston, Massachusetts, which he inherited from his parents. Patty's extreme hoarding has made it virtually impossible for her daughter, Ruby, to live with her in her Berkeley, California home.
25	"It's Out of Control"	April 6, 2011
Toni's compulsive shopping has made her San Francisco, California home a danger zone for her two-year-old granddaughter, Eden. In another part of the state, decades of extreme hoarding are threatening to break up Kay's family.
26	"Like a Dog in a Cage"	April 13, 2011
Nathan has hoarded his Oregon home for years, but it is now taking a toll on his marriage to his wife, Wenda, and his relationship with his three children. In Dallas, Texas, Kelaine has filled a house she inherited from her late mother with unusual possessions, which has put a strain on her relationship with her longtime live-in boyfriend, Kevin.
27	"It's a Freaking War Zone"	April 20, 2011
The tumbling piles of Maggie's suburban Chicago, Illinois home are putting her 19-year-old son, Justin's, life at risk due to his pneumothorax, while Bob's all-consuming passion for swimming pool parts has not only filled his Arizona home, but is now pushing his three children to the brink.

=== Season 3 (2011–2012) ===
No.	Title	Original release date
28	"Surviving on Trash"	July 10, 2011
In Florida, Jerri, a wild and eccentric woman, was once known as the local neat-freak. But her eye for treasures has gotten the best of her over the years, forcing her to abandon her once-beautiful home after filling it to the brim. Now her pregnant daughter, Traci, wants to clear the trash and move into her childhood home, but it is on the verge of being condemned due to a toxic swimming pool that has been unchecked for several years.
29	"There Are Mice Everywhere"	July 17, 2011
In Washington State, Kathleen has been a compulsive shopper for years, but not only does she need an organizer to help her clean up, she also needs an exterminator to deal with a serious rodent problem in her kitchen. And for Jamie, she is in denial about her hoard, but when her future son-in-law, Tim, comes to visit for the weekend, she must consider making an impression on him by clearing out her New Hampshire home.
30	"Not a Safe Place"	July 24, 2011
Over a year ago, Renee of Vallejo, California almost died from her diabetic condition when emergency workers were unable to get through her front door. With her home now deemed unlivable by the city, Renee knows she needs to make a change.
31	"A Horrible Sight"	July 31, 2011
Outside Vancouver, British Columbia, Canada, Rick desperately tries to salvage his cluttered home that was nearly destroyed by a kitchen fire. Just five years ago, Linda was homeless and slept under a filthy Ventura, California overpass. If she cannot get her house up to code within two months, she will be homeless again.
32	"I Was Gonna Gag"	August 14, 2011
Floyd's hoarding was triggered when his father had his childhood home and ranch torn down, despite Floyd wanting to move back. Now he must clear his hoard from his Northern California trailer or risk losing his two-year-old son, Charlie, to CPS.
33	"Is That a Goat?"	August 21, 2011
While Joyce sees comfort in her doll and craft collection, everyone else sees a creepy obsession that has overtaken her Southern California condo. Retired U.S. Marine Donny has been to jail twice because of the massive hoard in the front yard of his waterfront Dorchester County, Maryland home. He has a month to clean up or face a third prison sentence.
34	"Stop Touching My Stuff!"	August 28, 2011
It takes most hoarders years to fill a home with stuff, but for 16-year-old Haley, it can take less than a week to fill a bedroom in her suburban Chicago, Illinois home. Since the unexpected passing of her younger brother, Mikey, when she was four, Haley developed bipolar disorder and started stealing things from her parents and her younger sister, Zoey, prompting them to put locks on everything. Her family's only hope of giving her a wake-up call is having her visit Jahn from Season 2's "Nowhere Near Normal", who has been slowly but surely making progress with her own hoard since her first appearance on the show.
35	"Overtaken by Puppets"	September 11, 2011
Once a successful ventriloquist, Donna's career has since turned into an obsession with hundreds of puppets in her Long Island, New York home and her life. Harold loves spending time with his 12-year-old daughter, Hailey, but his cluttered Salt Lake City, Utah home is no place for children.
36	"I Can't Breathe"	September 18, 2011
Outside Seattle, Washington, single mother Larina has been in a legal battle with her sister, Tanya, over custody of her 10-year-old daughter, Alexiah, who is picking up her hoarding behavior, for the past three years. She has also been recovering from an abusive relationship from five years earlier. But when confronted with the challenge to let go of her clutter, Larina's compulsion threatens to win the battle.
37	"Tiny Monsters"	January 1, 2012
Sherry's hoard has forced her husband, Mark, out of their North Carolina home. With the house now infested with thousands of bugs, including cockroaches and black widow spiders, authorities are threatening to take away their two children, Ally and David, and condemn their home.
38	"My House Can Kill Me"	January 8, 2012
Miranda and Hsi-Ming are both mothers and extreme hoarders. Miranda's shopping obsession has left her two-year-old twins with no room to play amongst the clutter in her North Carolina home. Hsi-Ming emigrated to the United States from China after graduating from college, leaving everything she knew and loved behind. Now her daughter, Lara, is concerned for her mother's health and safety after seeing the unsafe conditions in her suburban Seattle, Washington home.
39	"Owned by the Roaches"	January 15, 2012
Celia, an addiction psychologist, helps others daily, but cannot solve her own hoarding problem. Now she is losing the battle against her stuff and the thousands of cockroaches infesting her South Florida home.
40	"I'm Dumbfounded"	January 22, 2012
After years of hoarding, Vickie and Jeff's marriage is at its breaking point. Not only are they dealing with the stress of the clutter in their Colorado Springs, Colorado home and their relationship, Jeff has been dealing with heart problems for the past six years, while Vickie has been hiding the fact that she purchased extra storage spaces with a little help from their children behind his back.
41	"It's Just Sex"	January 29, 2012
Janet and Herv have kept their hoarding a secret from everyone for 20 years, but a recent visit by the police has exposed their mess, and they now have a month to clean up or face homelessness. As they confront the clutter, however, shocking secrets concerning their relationship and sex lives are coming to light. Now they are in a fight to save both their suburban Richmond, Virginia home and their marriage.
42	"Worst I've Ever Seen"	February 12, 2012
City officials in South Bend, Indiana are threatening to demolish Caryn's childhood home and if the conditions do not change within three months, the consequences could be devastating. Theresa is putting compulsive shopping before her children in their time of greatest need and could end up losing everything, including her Georgia home.
43	"A Bomb Went Off"	February 19, 2012
Phyllis' neighbors are complaining about the trash bags piling up outside of her Ohio home, while the inside is so packed that she can barely move around. Faye, who suffers from COPD, realizes her hoard is killing her. She bought her house in suburban Houston, Texas just 10 years ago, but it is now home to piles of garbage and dead rats.
44	"Unbelievable"	March 4, 2012
Mary was evicted after her neighbors reported a gas leak in her Frederick, Maryland rowhouse and has just a month to clean out decades of stuff or have her home condemned. Brad has no idea what caused him to start hoarding, but a mountain of clutter has taken over his Illinois mobile home.
45	"Are You Serious?"	March 11, 2012
Amy's years of collecting have turned into a massive hoard. With her Montgomery, Alabama home nearly unlivable, she seeks help. Also, hoarding has not only destroyed Carol's relationship with her daughter, Crystal, but her suburban Detroit, Michigan home as well.

=== Season 4 (2012–2013) ===
No.	Title	Original release date
46	"This is Garbage Land"	July 8, 2012
For the past 20 years, Cary, an Elvis impersonator, has been living among piles of novelty items in his late mother's New York City apartment.
47	"As Bad as it Gets"	July 15, 2012
After over 20 years of hoarding his Ohio apartment, Randy has decided to move to a new house and start a new life, but first he must clear the eight-foot-high mountains of clutter out of his apartment.
48	"Sleeping in a Dumpster"	July 22, 2012
Laura's collecting has spiraled into a compulsion that has left her suburban New York City house in shambles and her relationship with her two sons, Ethan and Chad, on the brink of collapse. When her stove catches fire during her clean-up, it puts everyone's safety in jeopardy.
49	"This is Unreal"	July 29, 2012
Milton has always loved to shop, but after losing his mother six years ago, it became a compulsion that soon took over his life and his South Florida home. Louise has been diagnosed with breast cancer and the unhealthy living conditions of her Oregon home are only making the reality of the prognosis worse. Adding to her problems is her son, Adam, who has a collecting problem of his own.
50	"Just Tear it Down"	August 5, 2012
Like most hoarders, Darlene and Doug's home is packed. But in addition to the hoard, a collapsing roof, mold, and an overflowing septic tank have caught the attention of Code Enforcement, making eviction a real possibility.
51	"Twenty of Everything"	August 12, 2012
After nearly 30 years of hoarding, Gary's suburban Denver, Colorado house is so full that he is forced to sleep outside on a makeshift bed. With the city now threatening eviction, he must clean up or have his home condemned.
52	"Hoo, This Reeks!"	August 19, 2012
Kathy grew up with an abusive father, and it triggered her extreme hoarding, which forced her son, C.J., to move out of their duplex and in next door with her mother, Lois, five years ago. Now Kathy must make a drastic change or risk losing contact with him.
53	"A Humongous Secret"	August 26, 2012
No sooner does Dennis of North Carolina give up drinking, he turns to hoarding as his new addiction. Now severe debt and clutter have him moments away from losing everything. Meanwhile, outside Tulsa, Oklahoma, Monte has accumulated a massive clothing hoard, and it has destroyed her relationship with her son, Chase, in the process.
54	"It's My Junk"	September 2, 2012
Eileen and Jerry have been compulsive hoarders for years, but after Eileen suffered a fall that sent her to the hospital three months ago, their Michigan home grabbed the attention of authorities, who are now threatening them with eviction. Meanwhile, Dale has packed not one, but five suburban Detroit, Michigan houses full of clutter, which has strained his friendship with his next-door neighbor, Laura.
55	"You're Not Taking My Kids"	February 13, 2013
Karen, a twice-widowed New Jersey mother, not only risks losing her two sons, David and Joseph, for her hoarding, but also her five-acre wooded property.
56	"Holding Mom Hostage"	February 20, 2013
When hot-tempered David moved back in with his 93-year-old mother, Louise, he quickly filled her suburban Boston, Massachusetts home with clutter. Now the dangerous living conditions and David's short fuse have Louise cornered.
57	"This House Killed Her"	February 27, 2013
Cynthia turned to hoarding to replace her alcohol addiction, but when she died of lung cancer five months ago, she left her cluttered South Florida home to her three children. Not only do they have to clean it before they can sell it, they also must search it for some important documents that prove their mother was the owner.
58	"She Wants It, She Takes It"	March 6, 2013
Rhonda's suburban Nashville, Tennessee home is so filled with items from dumpsters that she has been forced to live in a camper in her backyard. With the city threatening to condemn her home and her neighbors on the brink of filing lawsuits, Rhonda must clean up or risk losing everything.
59	"What a Pig"	March 13, 2013
Valerie risks eviction from her Arlington, Massachusetts home when her next-door neighbor, Adam, reports her to the health department. Meanwhile, Ann owns a Michigan duplex that is so filled with clutter that she has been reduced to a three-square-foot space in her living room.
60	"They're Crawling!"	March 20, 2013
In The Woodlands, Texas, Kay denies that she is a hoarder, but a home filled with clutter and vermin tells another story. Now the city is just days away from condemning Kay's home, but the biggest challenge could be convincing her that she has a problem. NOTE: During filming, two members of the clean-up crew developed symptoms of hantavirus due to conditions; they were transported to a local hospital and recovered.
61	"One is Good, Two is Better"	March 27, 2013
As a top model on the Hollywood scene, Louise once ran with Tinseltown's elite. But behind her colorful outfits and personality, she still keeps a dark secret: her Los Angeles, California apartment is cluttered. When she realizes she is running out of money, she must reveal her secret to her friends, one of whom is adult film actor Ron Jeremy.
62	"She's Going to Jail"	April 3, 2013
In Cincinnati, Ohio, Joanne's hoarding is so extreme that she has already been to jail four times. She must clean out her home or risk a fifth prison sentence. Meanwhile, Tad and Amber recently purchased a house in Southern California, but did not know that the previous owner, Bonnie, was a hoarder until the deal was closed. She has 40 days to clean up or risk losing everything to the new owners.
63	"I'm a Rockstar, Baby!"	April 10, 2013
As the former lead singer of Canadian rock band Crowbar, Kelly Jay has lived quite a life and collected a massive hoard to prove it. After decades of collecting following the band's break-up, he now must choose between his clutter and his children by seeking the help of two of his former bandmates.

=== Season 5 (2013–2014) ===
No.	Title	Original release date
64	"Losing Half Myself"	April 17, 2013
In Illinois, Phyllis and Patty are not just identical twin sisters, but also identical twin hoarders. Since losing their older brother, Donnie, during the Vietnam War, they have transformed every home they have lived in into a complete disaster area. After losing one house, they have a month to clean out their current home or face eviction again.
65	"Leading a Double Life"	April 24, 2013
In Chicago, Illinois, Denise is the landlady of a duplex, but also a compulsive hoarder, which has remained unknown to her downstairs tenant, Lalie, until she, her daughter, Precious, and granddaughter, Lila, recently started suffering the effects of mold and vermin infestations, and they are now threatening to move out, putting Denise's financial situation in jeopardy.
66	"Somewhere in My Pile"	May 1, 2013
Beverly's shopping addiction has filled every last square inch of her Edmonton, Alberta, Canada home. Her dogs have made the upstairs space absolutely unlivable. With the threat of losing her home and dogs to the city, Beverly must clear the hoard or risk losing everything.
67	"Where Are They Now?"	May 8, 2013
68	"Waste Not, Want, Not"	May 15, 2013
Outside Trenton, New Jersey, Terri and Bill seem to be the perfect couple, but Terri's hoarding and bipolar disorders have put their marriage on the line. And in Brighton, Michigan, Nancy has been hoarding since her daughter, Renee, was murdered in 1994. If she cannot clear her cluttered home, she may also end up losing her husband, Tom, who is suffering from dementia.
69	"The Last Clear Spot"	October 30, 2013
Dale and her daughter, Jessica, who has dwarfism, are both compulsive hoarders, but now it has taken a toll on their financial situation, health, and relationship with Dale's sister, Sheila.
70	"Full of Rats"	November 6, 2013
Six months ago, Michelle was evicted from her Tacoma, Washington house due to debts and a severe mountain of clutter. Following Michelle's eviction, real estate investors Mark and Tony purchased the house at auction, unaware of the horrific conditions inside and out. Not only do they have to clear out the mess before they can fix up the property, but they also have to deal with a serious rat infestation.
71	"You're Gonna Die in Here"	November 13, 2013
Since learning that he was a target in a planned school shooting that never happened, former principal Wayne of Ontario, Canada developed PTSD and started hoarding in an effort to barricade himself from leaving his house, straining his relationship with his two daughters, Rachel and Lauren.
72	"My Teeth Are Lost in the Pile"	November 27, 2013
Plagued with dental problems since her early 20s, Lynn used to wear a pair of dentures, but has since lost them among the mounds of clutter in her suburban Pittsburgh, Pennsylvania duplex. Her hoarding has not only affected her health, but also her relationship with her boyfriend, Kyle, and heated disputes over the clutter and unpaid bills piling up have threatened to end their relationship and force them out of their home.
73	"It's a Horror Story"	December 4, 2013
When Susan begins to fill her boyfriend, Frank's, Pennsylvania home, he does some digging and learns that she owns another home two blocks away from his, which is packed to the brim with garbage.
74	"Running Out of Time"	February 5, 2014
Off the shores of Lake Tahoe, California, Jeff's hoarding has taken over his 2,000-square-foot home, and his 20-year-old son, Graham's, room is just as cluttered as his own. Faced with serious financial debt, he was forced to sell his home to pay off some overdue taxes. Following the sale, he was given 18 months to clear out his belongings, but now with only two weeks left before the deadline, not even a dent has been made.
75	"A VCR for Every Day of the Week"	February 12, 2014
John and Joseph of Cincinnati, Ohio are a father-and-son duo who both hoard. John is threatened with a six-month prison sentence for his cluttered property, while Joseph's explosive temper threatens his relationship with his girlfriend, Cheryl, and the possibility of having custody of their newborn son, Gabriel.
76	"Three Apartments, Three Hoarders"	February 19, 2014
Fred, Sandie, and Dorothy are all neighbors and extreme hoarders, who live in the same Deerfield Beach, Florida apartment complex. For years, their hoarding has gone unchecked, but with the property now under strict management, everything is about to change.
77	"The Donald Trump of Hoarding"	February 26, 2014
In Philadelphia, Pennsylvania, Mike has a potential life-saving surgery coming up in two weeks, but the endless mountains of garbage in his apartment are putting his recovery at serious risk.
78	"We're Gonna Need a Bigger Boat"	March 5, 2014
Outside New Orleans, Louisiana, Lea is at risk of going bankrupt and losing her three children if she cannot clean her house. And in New York City, Ken's entire world revolves around his girlfriend, Lauren, but as years of hoarding have taken a toll on their relationship, she is giving him one last chance to clean up.
79	"Worse Than a Haunted House"	March 12, 2014
In Sioux Falls, South Dakota, Silvia's hoarding is putting her family's unity on the line and her husband, Larry's, life at risk, leading to him recently suffering a stroke. And in Las Vegas, Nevada, longtime movie extra Laura's battle with hoarding is overshadowed by the discovery of her daughter, Alicia's, own compulsion to hold on to things.
80	"A Graveyard of Junk"	March 19, 2014
Seymour of Philadelphia, Pennsylvania is a retired doctor, who is dealing with his own health issues, including being a compulsive collector, which has turned his duplex into a cockroach nest. With his health and home on the line, he must get help to avoid spending the rest of his life homeless.
81	"The Stench is Amazing"	March 26, 2014
After losing his grandparents three years ago, Tim inherited their Kentucky house, where he lived since he was five years old, as well as over $100,000, which he has already burned through most of to fuel his hoarding obsession. Meanwhile, in Salt Lake City, Utah, identical twin brothers Oren and Loren, and their younger brother, Roy, have all been hoarding their home for over 20 years, but with an inspection by Code Enforcement just days away, they must clear out the property.
82	"It's a Rat's Nest"	April 2, 2014
If Doug does not get a handle on his extreme compulsion to collect things within the month, he stands to lose not one, but two Southern California houses filled with clutter.

== Analysis ==
Hoarding: Buried Alive is an example of a reality TV rehabilitation program, a category of show that has been extremely popular since 2000. However, the ability of these shows to treat people effectively is often questioned. Some focus on the fact that these shows do get people into some rehabilitation program. It is obviously better than them continuing their addictive behaviors without professional guidance. However, the presence of the cameras can influence the way the patients act. They may exaggerate certain emotions or fail to share essential information for fear of it coming back to haunt them once the show is aired. These additions and omissions could greatly impair their ability to recover and move forward in the process.

In addition to the information regarding the disease being provided in the show, many of these programs help people get in contact with organizations that can provide treatment or more information on the disease. This can help viewers get a better picture of the disorders depicted and combats the stigma that surrounds mental illness.

Hoarding paints a picture of compulsive hoarders that makes viewers sympathize with them. It helps people understand that it is an illness. When these individuals enter a rehab program, the quality of their lives and the lives of their families can improve drastically. It also provides a view of the disease that is not totally bent on feeding the human appetite for horror. Instead, it focuses more on giving an accurate look at the illness. It picks cases that are not overly extreme or graphic and doesn't dwell completely on the disturbing things that the patient has collected. It focuses on conveying the ugly truth about the illness, focusing on the way it affects both the afflicted individual and their family.

== See also ==
- Hoarders (TV series)
