= 4L (group) =

South Korean girl group

- Origin: Seoul, South Korea
- Genres: K-pop; dance
- Years active: 2014–2016
- Label: Jade Contents
- Past members: Yeseul; Chany; Jayoung; J-na
- Website: Official website

4L (Korean: 포엘, short for Four Ladies) was a South Korean girl group formed in 2014 by Jade Contents Media. The group debuted on August 1, 2014, with their first and only single Move. The group disbanded in 2016.

== Biography ==
Members Chany, Jayoung and J-na debuted on 20 February 2014 in girl group M.O.A, whom they were performing with since December 2013. They left sometime in spring, after the release of the music video for their second song, "Run For Your Dream".

Jade Contents Media revealed the first teaser of "Move" on 28 July, bringing in a lot of attention due to the lesbian couple themed MV and a sexually suggestive choreography. After releasing two more provocative teasers, controversies arouse and the company responded with "Our strategy is to show raw sexiness. The teasers are just the tip of the iceberg."

On 1 August 2014, 4L released the full MV for "Move", which reached 1 million views on YouTube four days later, and 2 million on 7 August. Their official YouTube channel garnered over 6 million views overall in nearly two weeks. "Move" was also the fifth most viewed worldwide Korean MV on YouTube in August, surpassing songs by established artists like Kara, Secret and Sistar. The single "Move" was released on Korean online websites the 4th of the same month, and on the same week entered Gaon Social Chart at number 4 with 41,479 points.

"Move" was mainly promoted at local and university festivals, where they performed Lee Moon-se's "Flaming Sunset" and their debut song with different outfits and a more sober choreography; their only TV appearance on music shows was on 14 September on SBS's Inkigayo.

4L were the only girl group attending the KNation Music Showcase in Manila on 5 October 2014, where they performed five songs: "Move", Jennifer Lopez's "On the Floor", Psy's "Gangnam Style" and "Gentleman", and "Flaming Sunset".

At the end of the year, Yeseul left the group because of the extreme exposure. She redebuted as a solo artist on 2 June 2015 with first single "Maybe I Love U" (사랑하나봐) under Ziantmusic and Ogan Entertainment. In December she went back to the group to perform "Move" together with J-na and Jayoung under the group name of Instar (인스타) at Wanda Group Investment Conference. A different 7-member girl group would be active under the same name in 2016.

On 16 June 2016, Jayoung announced on her Instagram profile that she and J-na would redebut as a trot duo under the name J.Young. Due to this, 4L's website being taken offline and Chany having not appeared with either member in quite a while, it is assumed that 4L has disbanded.

== Members ==
=== Former members ===
- Yeseul (예슬)
- Chany (차니)
- J-na (제이나)
- Jayoung (자영)

== Discography ==
=== Singles ===
Title	Year	Peak chart position	Album
Title	Year	KOR	Album
"Move"	2014	— (Note: "Move" did not enter the Gaon Digital Chart top 200, but appeared at number 4 on the Social Chart.)	Move
"—" denotes releases that did not chart or were not released in that region.

=== Music videos ===
Year	Title	Director
2014	"Move"	DT
