= First mover =

First mover may refer to:

- Unmoved mover, a concept in Aristotle's philosophy
- First-mover advantage in marketing
- First-move advantage in chess

== See also ==
- Prime mover (disambiguation)
