= Moove =

Moove may refer to:

- A flavored milk product by Bega Dairy & Drinks
- A virtual world social software product on the List of social software

== See also ==
- Move (disambiguation)
