= Moves =

Moves may refer to:

- Moves (ballet), by Jerome Robbins
- Moves (magazine), a periodical
- Moves (Singing Adams album), 2012
- Moves (Kirara album), 2016
- "Moves" (Big Sean song), 2017
- "Moves" (Olly Murs song), 2018
- A mobile app involving exercise, acquired by Facebook, Inc. in 2014, discontinued in 2018

== See also ==
- Move (disambiguation)
- Mover (disambiguation)
