= Sun Set =

Compilation album by Klaatu
- Released: May 7, 2005
- Recorded: January 1, 1973 – November 13, 1981
- Genres: Pop rock; psychedelic pop; progressive pop
- Label: Bullseye Records of Canada
- Producers: Klaatu; Terry Brown; Christopher Bond

Klaatu chronology
| Peaks (1993) | Sun Set (2005) | Raarities (2005) |

Sun Set is a compilation album of music by Klaatu, released on May 7, 2005 by independent Canadian label Bullseye Records. It features rarities, outtakes, demos, live tracks and other recordings from 1973 to 1981. It was launched at the "KlaatuKon" 2005 convention in Toronto, Ontario, Canada. The final nine tracks on disc one are alternate versions of Klaatu's second album project, Hope. Referred to as "The Orchestral Hope", this included a track not present on the version of Hope which was originally released; "Epilogue," which joined "So Said the Lighthouse Keeper" and "Hope", as well as "For You Girl", a single B-side that was not included on any album.

== Track listing ==
Disc one: 1973 - 1977
| No. | Title | Writer(s) | Length |
|---|---|---|---|
| 1. | "Hanus of Uranus" (7" single) | Dee Long | 2:48 |
| 2. | "Sub-Rosa Subway" (7" single) | John Woloschuk, Dino Tome | 4:14 |
| 3. | "Cherie" (previously unreleased single mix) | Long | 3:01 |
| 4. | "Doctor Marvello" (7" single) | Woloschuk | 3:31 |
| 5. | "For You Girl" (7" single B-side) | Long | 2:38 |
| 6. | "California Jam" (7" single) | Woloschuk, Tome | 3:02 |
| 7. | "True Life Hero" (TV mix) | Long | 3:26 |
| 8. | "Calling Occupants of Interplanetary Craft" (anti-adversary mix) | Woloschuk, Terry Draper | 6:25 |
| 9. | "Sir Bodsworth Rugglesby III" (original vocal mix) | Woloschuk | 3:37 |
| 10. | "Little Neutrino" (original vocal mix) | Long | 4:59 |
| 11. | "We're Off You Know" (orchestral) | Woloschuk | 3:20 |
| 12. | "Around the Universe in 80 Days" (orchestral) | Long | 4:44 |
| 13. | "Madman" (orchestral) | Long | 2:46 |
| 14. | "Long Live Politzania" (orchestral) | Woloschuk | 9:11 |
| 15. | "The Loneliest of Creatures" (orchestral) | Woloschuk | 3:38 |
| 16. | "Prelude" (orchestral) | Woloschuk | 5:26 |
| 17. | "So Said the Lighthouse Keeper" (orchestral) | Woloschuk | 6:07 |
| 18. | "Epilogue" (previously unreleased; orchestral) | Woloschuk | 0:42 |
| 19. | "Hope" (orchestral) | Woloschuk | 3:48 |

Disc two: 1978 - 1981
| No. | Title | Writer(s) | Length |
|---|---|---|---|
| 1. | "A Routine Day" (7" single) | Woloschuk | 3:08 |
| 2. | "Juicy Luicy" (my oh my mix) | Woloschuk | 3:45 |
| 3. | "Everybody Took a Holiday" (megaphone mix) | Long | 3:04 |
| 4. | "Older" (live) | Long | 3:19 |
| 5. | "Dear Christine" (alternate mix) | Woloschuk | 3:35 |
| 6. | "Mister Manson" (original mix) | Long | 2:37 |
| 7. | "Tokeymor Field" (demo) | Woloschuk | 3:05 |
| 8. | "Sir Rupert Said..." (studio outtake) | | 2:41 |
| 9. | "Sell Out, Sell Out" (demo) | Woloschuk | 4:48 |
| 10. | "Howl at the Moon" (demo) | Woloschuk, Tome | 3:31 |
| 11. | "I Can't Help It" (full-length mix) | Long | 4:12 |
| 12. | "Paranoia" (demo) | Woloschuk | 3:52 |
| 13. | "Set the World on Fire" (demo) | Woloschuk | 4:17 |
| 14. | "Dog Star" (demo) | Long | 4:03 |
| 15. | "All Good Things" (demo) | Woloschuk | 2:26 |
| 16. | "There's Something Happening" (previously unreleased) | Long | 2:42 |
| 17. | "I Don't Wanna Go Home" (demo) | Woloschuk | 2:52 |
| 18. | "At the End of the Rainbow" (alternate vocal mix) | Long | 3:13 |
| 19. | "December Dream" (full-length mix) | Woloschuk, Draper | 5:41 |
| 20. | "Mrs. Toad's Cookies" (alternate mix) | Woloschuk | 3:12 |
| 21. | "Magentalane" (full-length mix) | Woloschuk | 3:29 |
| 22. | "Ambrose Lightship" (previously unreleased) | | 1:00 |
