= Beatlesque =

Resemblance to the English band the Beatles

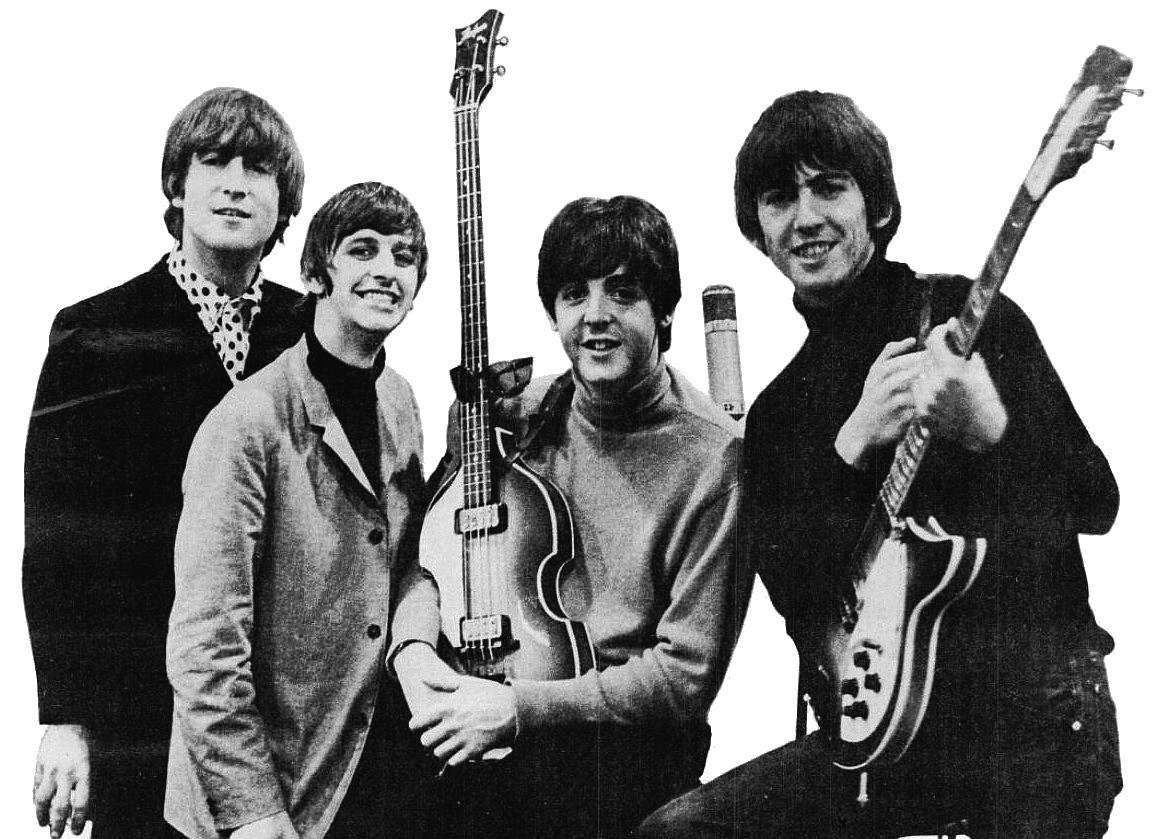
The Beatles, 1965

"Beatlesque" (/ˌbiːtəlˈɛsk/) or "Beatles-esque" describes a musical resemblance to the English rock band the Beatles. The term is loosely defined and has been applied inconsistently to a wide variety of disparate artists.

== Definitions ==
To better explain what the word might mean, eight possible answers were formulated by radio producer Kevin Howlett, music professor Rob Bowman, and Klaatu drummer Terry Draper:

- "Penny Lane"-style piano tone clusters (also heard on "Getting Better" and "With a Little Help from My Friends")
- "the big ending", as in "It's All Too Much"
- bluegrass-influenced close harmonies, using fourth intervals
- "I Am the Walrus"-inspired cellos
- the stylistic contrast between Lennon and McCartney
- the left-handed, right-handed drumming; referencing Ringo Starr's habit of playing right-handed drum kits despite being left-handed
- when audiences feel that the band is a continuation of the Beatles, as was the case for Klaatu
- a simulacrum of the Beatles' reputed sound that ultimately means nothing ("a copy without an original").

The Toronto Star's Jack Sakamoto has commented: "[Some people's] notion of that sound includes everyone from Panic! at the Disco to Billy Joel to the Red Hot Chili Peppers. With those reference points, it's debatable whether the Beatles themselves would qualify for the adjective their music has spawned." Culture Sonar's Scott Freiman argued that anyone who is "Beatlesque" has "got to be a band – not just a singer/songwriter with a backing band ... [but having] multiple songwriters and multiple vocalists".

Writing in 2017, Rolling Stone critic Rob Sheffield identified Paul McCartney as the Beatle whose character best fitted the term "Beatlesque", adding: "If you dislike the Beatles, it's because you dislike Paul. If you love them despite their flaws, you mean Paul's flaws ..."

== Associated artists ==
Notable acts described as "Beatlesque"

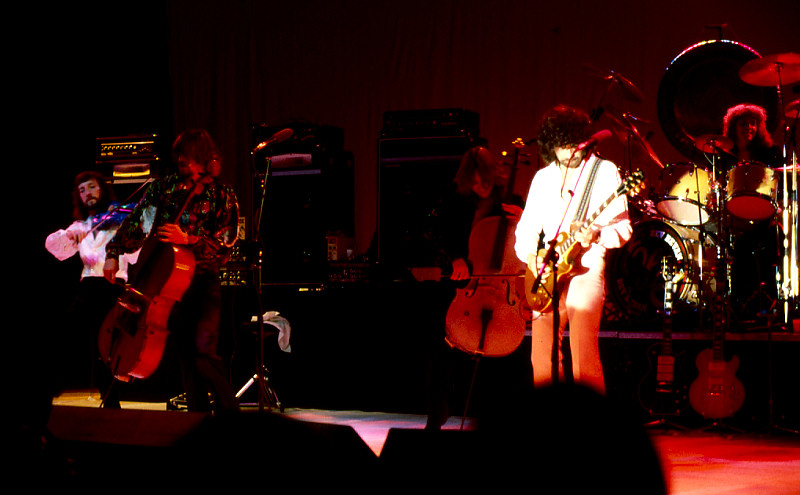
ELO, 1978

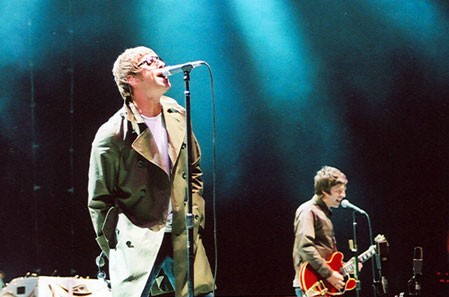
Oasis, 2005

- Badfinger – The first artists to sign with the Beatles' Apple Records. Their songs "Come and Get It" (1969), "No Matter What" (1970) and "Day After Day" (1971) were produced by McCartney, Beatles road manager Mal Evans, and George Harrison, respectively.
- Big Star – Although the American band attracted acclaim for its Beatles-influenced work in the 1970s, its life proved contentious and short. They earned acclaim and a cult following despite the lack of commercial success.
- The Byrds – Sometimes regarded as the "American Beatles". While their long-term influence has proven to be comparable to that of the Beatles in terms of sound and style, the Byrds failed to match their record sales.
- Cheap Trick – Also sometimes known as the "American Beatles". In addition, the group's 1980 album All Shook Up was produced by longtime Beatles producer George Martin, and the group's live performance of Beatles songs culminated with a full orchestra-backed live album, titled Sgt. Pepper Live (2009).
- Electric Light Orchestra – Formed explicitly with the intention of "picking up where the Beatles left off", the outfit has proved one of the few Beatlesque groups to achieve sustained commercial success. In addition, frontman Jeff Lynne began a musical collaboration with George Harrison in the late 1980s that led to him working on several projects related to the Beatles. In the early 1970s, John Lennon praised ELO as "sons of Beatles" and cited their 1973 song "Showdown" as a personal favourite.
- Elephant 6 – Not a band, but a collective of them. The collective is famously inspired by psychedelic pop of the 1960s, including the Beatles and the Beach Boys, with bands like the Apples in Stereo and Of Montreal gathering comparisons to the Beatles.
- Harry Nilsson – During a 1968 press conference, the Beatles were asked what their favorite American group was and answered "Nilsson". Sometimes known as "The American Beatle", he was close friends with both John Lennon and Ringo Starr.
- Klaatu – Falsely rumoured to be the Beatles themselves, re-formed. The band are sometimes known as the "Canadian Beatles".
- Oasis – Their Beatles influence was labelled as an "obsession" by British media. During their 1991 to 2009 career, the band's widespread success in terms of culture and social reach caused it to be possibly the most popular band since the Beatles.
- Squeeze – The British band's songwriting pair of Chris Difford and Glenn Tilbrook has attracted comparisons to the Lennon–McCartney partnership. Both Difford and Tilbrook have acknowledged the influence of the comparison on the band's catalogue.

Other

- Bee Gees (early years)
- Chris Hillman
- Marshall Crenshaw
- Crowded House
- Fountains of Wayne
- Grapefruit
- Herman's Hermits
- The Knack
- The Knickerbockers
- The La's
- Los Shakers
- The Lovin' Spoonful
- The Monkees
- Panic! at the Disco (Pretty. Odd. album)
- The Sea Nymphs
- The Raspberries
- The Smithereens
- Tame Impala
- The Turtles
- Utopia (Deface the Music album)
- XTC

== See also ==
- Cultural impact of the Beatles
- Musical style and development of the Beatles
  - List of the Beatles' instruments
  - The Beatles' recording technology
- Pop rock
- Power pop
