= Perpetual Motion Machine (disambiguation) =

A perpetual motion machine is a hypothetical machine that can do work indefinitely without an energy source.

Perpetual Motion Machine may also refer to:

- Perpetual Motion Machine (13 Engines album), 1993
- Perpetual Motion Machine (Synthetic Breed album), 2010
- "Perpetual Motion Machine", a song by Klaatu from the album Sir Army Suit
- "Perpetual Motion Machine", a song by Modest Mouse from the album No One's First, and You're Next
