= Prime mover =

Prime mover may refer to:

== Philosophy ==
- Unmoved mover, a concept in Aristotle's writings

== Engineering ==
- Prime mover (engine or motor), a machine that converts various other forms of energy (chemical, electrical, fluid pressure/flow, etc.) into energy of movement
- Prime mover (locomotive), one of the several types of power plants used in locomotives to provide traction power
- Prime mover (tractor unit), a heavy-duty towing engine that provides motive power for hauling a towed or trailered load

== Anatomy ==
- Prime mover, another name for an agonist muscle

== Entertainment ==
- Prime Mover (film), a 2009 Australian romantic crime film
- Prime Mover (comics), a fictional character in the Marvel Universe
- Prime Mover, a video game published by Psygnosis in 1993
- "The Prime Mover", a 1961 episode of The Twilight Zone
- The Prime Movers, a quasi-omniscient race of alien superbeings in the Buck Godot comic series by Phil Foglio
- Prime Movers: The Makers of Modern Dance in America, a 1977 book about the history of modern dance in the United States

=== Music ===
- Prime Mover (album), a 1988 album by the Christian Rock band AD
- The Prime Movers (Michigan band), a 1960s band featuring a pre-Stooges Iggy Pop
- The Prime Movers (Los Angeles band), a predecessor band of Dread Zeppelin
- Prime Movers (album), a 2016 compilation by Slim Dusty
- "Prime Mover", a 1983 single by Leather Nun
- "Prime Mover", a 1987 single by Zodiac Mindwarp
- "Prime Mover", a song on Rush's 1987 album Hold Your Fire
- "Prime Mover", a song on Ghost's 2010 album Opus Eponymous
- "Prime Mover", a 2012 album by German trance producer Alex M.O.R.P.H.
- "Prime Movers", a song on Covenant's 2013 album Leaving Babylon
- The Prime Movers, a band of former members of The Prisoners

== See also ==
- First mover (disambiguation)
