= Prime Movers: The Makers of Modern Dance in America =

- Author: Joseph H. Mazo
- Language: English
- Subject: Modern dance
- Genre: Non-fiction
- Published: William Morrow and Company
- Publication date: 1977
- Publication place: United States
- Pages: 322
- ISBN: 9780688030780

Prime Movers: The Makers of Modern Dance in America is a 1977 book about the history of modern dance in the United States.

== Publication ==
The book was written by former The New York Times dance critic Joseph H. Mazo was published by William Morrow and Company in 1977. The book details the history of modern dance, starting with Loie Fuller and ending with Twyla Tharp. The book's dust jacket says that "it makes American modern dance comprehensible, approachable, accessible — and fun."

== Reception ==
Danielle A. Warnes of Southtown Star wrote that the book "provides unexpected insights into the backgrounds that "made" his dancers." Kirkus Reviews said that Mazo never mentions what the 11 featured choreographers exactly did and that "a good review of these major figures still remains to be written."
