= Self-motion =

Self-motion can refer to:

- The property of motion being inherent in a particular entity, being voluntary. For example, a mouse can have self-motion, a stone cannot
- The experience of self-motion, as in illusions of self-motion
