= King Biscuit Boy =

Canadian blues musician (1944–2003)

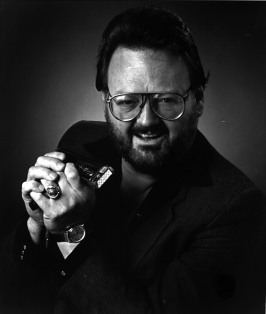
- King Biscuit Boy in 1997

Background information
- Born: Richard Alfred Newell; March 9, 1944; Hamilton, Ontario, Canada
- Died: January 5, 2003 (aged 58) Hamilton, Ontario, Canada
- Genres: Blues, country blues, R&B, soul
- Instruments: Vocals, guitar, harmonica
- Years active: 1961–2003

Richard Alfred Newell (March 9, 1944 – January 5, 2003), better known by his stage name, King Biscuit Boy, was a Canadian blues musician. He was the first Canadian blues artist to chart on the Billboard Hot 100 in the U.S. Newell played guitar and sang, but he was most noted for his harmonica playing. Newell's stage name, given to him by Ronnie Hawkins, was taken from the King Biscuit Time, an early American blues broadcast.

King Biscuit Boy played with Muddy Waters, Joe Cocker, Janis Joplin, Allen Toussaint, and The Meters.

== Early life ==
Newell was born in Hamilton, Ontario, Canada. His parents were Lily and Walter Newell, who was a member of the British Royal Air Force stationed in Canada during World War II. He married once, to Jacqueline Willetts in 1972, and they were divorced in 1979.

Newell developed an eclectic interest in music at a young age, and purchased his first harmonica at age 12.

== Career ==
Newell played with the Barons (later renamed Son Richard and the Chessmen) from 1961 to 1965 and then with The Mid-Knights. In the summer of 1969 he helped to form 'And Many Others', which was Ronnie Hawkins's backing band at that time. After one LP and several U.S. appearances, Hawkins fired the entire band in early 1970, upon which the members, including Newell, formed their own band, which they named Crowbar. Newell recorded an album with Crowbar, called Official Music, through Love Productions, and then embarked on a solo career. He continued to play with Crowbar off and on for the rest of his career.

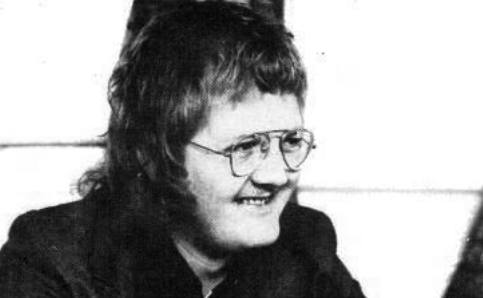
King Biscuit Boy in 1973

After leaving Crowbar, he signed a major American deal with Paramount/Epic. Seven solo albums followed, along with two Juno nominations (the Juno Awards are the Canadian equivalent of the U.S. Grammy Awards). His single, "New Orleans" (Epic 8–50129), reached No. 68 in Canada in September 1975. Reviewing his self-titled 1974 album in Christgau's Record Guide: Rock Albums of the Seventies (1981), Robert Christgau wrote: "King Biscuit Boy/Richard Newell is a Canadian Paul Butterfield, which I mean as a compliment, and when he sings lead with producer Allen Toussaint doing backups it's the ultimate white blues fantasy. In reality, though, Newell's high-strung earnestness and virtuoso harmonica can't take this album away from Toussaint".

Newell released his last album in early 2003 on Race Records, an independent record label in Hamilton, Ontario. It was a collaboration with saxophonist Sonny Del-Rio (a former Crowbar bandmate and long-standing friend), entitled Two Hound Blues. The album was a combination of six lost tracks from the 1981 King Biscuit Boy album, Biscuits 'n' Gravy, and the 1991 Sonny Del-Rio effort, 40 Years of Rock & Roll and All I Got's the Blues, which was recorded in 2002.

== Instruments ==
Newell preferred Hohner Special 20 (diatonic) harmonicas, and used a Danelectro amplifier late in his career. He rarely played a chromatic harmonica, either on stage or in the studio.

== Personal life ==
Blake "Kelly Jay" Fordham (a former Crowbar bandmate and friend) recalled that Newell had a soft spot in his heart for 1950s doo-wop music. "We'd do a medley, four chords in F, and see how many songs we could fit into it; stuff by Johnnie & Joe – "Over the Mountain; Across the Sea," and "You Belong to Me", or "Talk to Me", by Little Willie John. Each week we'd try to best ourselves, see who could come up with more. He would always find the most obscure stuff."

== Health and death ==
Due to his heavy drinking, Newell's health deteriorated as he aged, which led to performance problems and cancelled shows. He died at his home in Hamilton, Ontario, in 2003, two months short of his fifty-ninth birthday.

== Legacy ==
A couple of months after his death, friends of Newell held a benefit show at a downtown Hamilton, Ontario, club, to create a trust fund in his name. More than 100 musicians from across the country showed up to play at Club 77 at the first annual "Blues with a Feeling" benefit show. The show was successful and "The Friends of Richard Newell" have held one every year since, with the money raised going to a music scholarship fund at Mohawk College of Applied Arts and Technology in Hamilton, Ontario.

== Discography ==
- Official Music (with Crowbar) (1970, Daffodil (Canada); 1970, Paramount (US); 1996, Stony Plain)
- Gooduns (1971, Daffodil (Canada); 1971, Paramount (US); 1996, Stony Plain)
- King Biscuit Boy (also known as The Brown Derby Album) (1974, Epic)
- Badly Bent: The Best of King Biscuit Boy (1976, Daffodil; 1996, Stony Plain)
- Biscuits 'n' Gravy (1981, Daffodil)
- Mouth of Steel (1982 [1984], Red Lightnin' (UK); 1984, Stony Plain)
- King Biscuit Boy AKA Richard Newell (1988, Stony Plain)
- Urban Blues Re: Newell (1995, Blue Wave (US); 1995, Stony Plain)
- Two Hound Blues (with Sonny Del-Rio) (2002 [2003], Race Records)
