= Move (4L song) =

Single by 4L
- Released: August 4, 2014
- Recorded: 2014
- Genre: K-pop; dance
- Length: 3:16
- Label: Jade Contents; A&G Modes

Music video
- "Move" on YouTube

"Move" is a debut and only single by South Korean girl group 4L. It was released as a digital single on August 4, 2014, through Jade Contents Media and A&G Modes.

== Release ==
Jade Contents Media revealed the first teaser of "Move" on 28 July, bringing in a lot of attention due to the lesbian couple themed MV. After releasing two more provocative teasers, controversies arose and the company responded with "Our strategy is to show raw sexiness. The teasers are just the tip of the iceberg."

4L released the full MV for "Move" on 1 August, while the single was released on Korean online websites three days later.

== Promotions ==
4L held their debut stage on music shows with "Move" 14 September on SBS's Inkigayo. The reason for the big gap between the release of the song and the debut stage was that the choreography, song and clothes had to be changed.

== Music video ==
The full music video was released 1 August and reached 1 million views four days later. It was also the fifth most viewed worldwide Korean MV on YouTube in August, surpassing established songs from artists like Kara, Secret and Sistar.

== Track listing ==
No.	Title	Lyrics	Music	Length
1.	"Move"	어깨깡패	어깨깡패	3:16
2.	"Move (Inst.)"		어깨깡패	3:16
Total length:				6:32

== Charts ==
Chart (2014)	Peak position
Gaon Social Chart (Gaon)	4
