= Perpetuum Mobile (disambiguation) =

Perpetuum mobile is a term for music characterised by a continuous steady stream of notes or repetition.

Perpetuum Mobile may also refer to:

== Music ==
- Perpetuum Mobile (album), an album by Einsturzende Neubauten
- Perpetuum mobile, Telemann Ouvertüre in D TWV 55:D12
- Perpetuum mobile, Arvo Pärt
- Perpetuum Mobile, Op. 257 Johann Strauss II
- Perpetuum mobile, Busoni
- Perpetuum mobile, Tchaikovsky
- "Perpetuum Mobile", a 1987 single from the Penguin Cafe Orchestra

== Science ==
- Perpetuum mobile, another term for perpetual motion machine

== Organizations ==
- Perpetuum Mobile (organization), a curatorial organization
