= Daffodil Records =

Daffodil Records may refer to:

- Daffodil Records (American label), founded by Blossom Dearie in 1973
- Daffodil Records (Canadian label), existed from 1971 to 1978
