= The Movement (comics) =

DC series about teen superheroes

- Issue #1 cover, art by Freddie Williams II.

Group publication information
- Publisher: DC Comics
- First appearance: The Movement #1 (May 2013)
- Created by: Gail Simone; Freddie Williams II

In-story information
- Base(s): The Sweatshop, Coral City

The Movement

Series publication information
- Schedule: Monthly
- Format: Ongoing series
- Genre: Crime, political, superhero
- Publication date: May 2013 – May 2014
- Number of issues: 12 (as of July 2014 cover date)

Creative team
- Writer(s): Gail Simone
- Artist(s): Freddie Williams II
- Letterer(s): Carlos M. Mangual
- Colorist(s): Chris Sotomayor
- Creator(s): Gail Simone; Freddie Williams II
- Editor(s): Kate Stewart; Kyle Andrukiewicz; Joey Cavalieri; Matt Idelson

The Movement is a 2013-2014 comic book series published by DC Comics that ran for 12 issues, written by Gail Simone and illustrated by Freddie Williams II. The series took place within the DC Universe as part of The New 52. It focused on a group of teenagers, known as The Movement or Channel M, who use their superpowers to fight the corruption in Coral City.

== Publication history ==
The Movement was first announced in February 2013, alongside its sister book The Green Team. Simone noted a connection between the two books "almost from the very start. And it's fair to say the two groups won't exactly see eye to eye".

When announcing The Movement and The Green Team, DC Comics released a promotional image which read: "Meet the 99%... They were the super-powered disenfranchised—now they're the voice of the people!" However, Simone clarified The Movement was not based solely on the Occupy Movement. She planned to incorporate elements of all social movements of recent years. Simone describes the title as "a book about power – who owns it, who uses it, who suffers from its abuse", and sees the book as Teen Titans or X-Men for a modern audience of young readers.

The first issue was published on May 1, 2013. It introduced a group of super-powered teens and a group of anonymous activist hackers who "all have reason to be mad at the system, which hasn't protected them, or even tolerated them".

== Fictional team biography ==
The team's base of operations is an old abandoned garment factory, a sweatshop, from 1898. The residents of the base refer to it as "The Sweatshop", or as "the 181", the latter term signifying 181 women who were locked inside, and buried alive during an earthquake.

The citizens of Coral City come into conflict with two police officers caught sexually harassing a suspect. The officers are surrounded by a group of citizens wearing masks and recording the event. The footage is leaked to the press, with credit given to a group named Channel M. Later, officers attempt to arrest Burden, a teenager suspected of serial killing. The members of the Movement stop the entire squad of officers, and take the two officers who previously sexually harassed the girl into their own custody, and invite Burden to join The Movement. The Police Captain is told by Virtue that the "tweens", Tenth Street to Twentieth Street, is theirs and for the police to stay away.

== Characters ==
The Movement is composed of teenagers and young-adults:

- Virtue (Holly Ann Fields) is the leader of the team. Virtue has the ability to "ride" emotions. She is dating Sarah Rainmaker.
- Tremor (Roshanna Chatterji) has the ability to create vibrations, giving her the power to create earthquakes or disrupt land. Tremor previously appeared in Gail Simone's Secret Six. She is asexual.
- Mouse (Jayden Revell) has the ability to control and talk to rats.
- Katharsis (Kulap Vilaysack) is a former cop of the Gotham City Police Department. She first appeared in Gail Simone's "Knightfall" arc in Batgirl as part of The Disgraced. She has artificial wings, granting her the ability to fly. She relies on her brute strength and sword skills.
- Burden (Christopher) believes he is possessed. He has been shown to levitate, but the range of his abilities is currently unknown. He reveals himself to be gay.
- Vengeance Moth (Drew Fisher), a nineteen-year-old wheelchair user. She has the ability to form a glowing green moth, which can act as a shield and can make her capable of flight, among other things. She appears to be able to exude some sort of ultrasonic wave.

=== Supporting characters ===
- Rainmaker, a character who previously existed in the Wildstorm Universe as part of Gen13. The team suspects her of being the Cornea Killer. She is introduced as "The Weather Witch" and is dating Virtue.
- Captain Meers, a police captain in Coral City who comes into conflict with the members of the Movement during their investigation of the Cornea Killer.

== Reception ==
The series debuted as the 74th best selling title by units in May, with an estimated 29,246 copies ordered. Reviews of the first issue were mixed.

Matthew Santori-Griffith of Comicosity rated the first issue 9 out of 10 and wrote that, aside from its billing as a "super-heroic extension of the Occupy movement", the book is "far more than that narrow worldview". He also says the book introduces a diverse cast of characters, "both ethnic and in personality and powers". Griffith notes the title blends cynicism and optimism, creating an environment that is "complex and deeply intriguing as our very own".

Zach Wilkerson of Multiversity Comics wrote that "Simone does a lackluster job of selling the necessity of the Movement as a group, one of several problems with this opening issue". He does, however, note "the intriguing new heroes, the strong first impression of Coral City, and William's dynamic and engaging art, make this a book that stands out among the New 52's standard brand of doom and gloom".

Doug Zawisza of Comic Book Resources gave a negative review, rating the book 1.5 stars out of 5: "The Movement feels like a loosely connected collection of notions, which together compile an incomplete and not particularly compelling story. None of the characters really wow me".

== In other media ==
- In the season two episode of Arrow, "Blast Radius", Mark Scheffer / "Shrapnel" is revealed to be part of the anarchist group, "The Movement".
