= Terry Draper =

Canadian musician (1951–2025)

- Draper, c. mid–late 1970s

Background information
- Born: Terry Edward Draper; September 22, 1951; Toronto, Ontario, Canada
- Died: May 15, 2025 (aged 73) Newmarket, Ontario, Canada
- Genres: Rock; pop; psychedelia
- Instruments: Drums; vocals; guitar; keyboards
- Years active: 1973–1982; 1988; 1997–2025
- Labels: Daffodil; Capitol (US); Bullseye
- Formerly of: Klaatu
- Website: terrydraper.com

Terry Edward Draper (September 22, 1951 – May 15, 2025) was a Canadian musician who was the drummer and one of three members of the 1970s rock band Klaatu.

== Career ==
Draper co-wrote the song "Calling Occupants of Interplanetary Craft", which was not only successful with his band Klaatu, but also became a Top-40 hit for the Carpenters when they covered it in 1977. Draper also co-wrote the Klaatu songs "Prelude" in 1977 and "December Dream" in 1981, the latter being a tribute to John Lennon.

He went on to record several solo albums in his home studio in Oak Ridges, Ontario, after the break-up of the band in 1981. His former Klaatu bandmates Dee Long and John Woloschuk made appearances on his album Light Years Later in 1997.

== Personal life and death ==
Before becoming a successful musician, Draper had a construction business with a speciality in roofing.

Later on in the 1980s he returned to his roofing business and then developed a career as a restaurateur alongside his continued music work.

Draper died in Newmarket, Ontario on May 15, 2025, at the age of 73, from leukemia.

== Solo releases ==
- Light Years Later (1997)
- Terry & The Twilight Zone: Live... Years Later (1997)
- Terrytoons Presents: Can You Pretend? (1999)
- Civil War (And Other Love Songs) (2001)
- Civil War (Not Very) (2001)
- Furzall Family (2002)
- Aria 52 - A Five Year Mission (2004)
- Stranded (2010)
- When The World Was Young (2014)
- Searching (2016)
- Window On The World (2016)
- Remarkable Women (2017)
- A Very Terry Christmas (2017)
- Once Upon A Memory (2018)
- In My Garden (2019)
- Sunset on Mars (2020)
- Lost (2020)
- The Other Side (2021)
- Bread and Cirkus (2022)
- In the Beginning (2023)
- Infinity (2025)
