= Daffodil Records (Canadian label) =

Canadian record label

Daffodil Records was a Canadian record label that existed from 1971 to 1978.

== History ==
Daffodil Records was co-founded in Canada, in 1971, by Frank Davies, who had previously been associated in the United Kingdom with Liberty Records and EMI Records. Davies assumed the position of vice-president of the new label.

The label was owned by Love Productions Ltd., the first release of which was a single, "Uncle Pen", by Blake Fordham, later known as Kelly Jay, of Crowbar. The single was released on London Records. The first album released by Daffodil Records was Official Music, by King Biscuit Boy with Crowbar. At the time, the label announced a distribution agreement with Capitol Records, though the label appears to have been initially distributed by GRT Records and, as of 1978, Capitol Records. Canadian artists releasing recordings through the label included King Biscuit Boy, Crowbar, A Foot in Coldwater, Klaatu and Fludd.

The label is notable as having released the first live-in-concert album by a Canadian band: Crowbar's Larger Than Life: And Live'r Than You'll Ever Be, a recording of the band's concert at Toronto's Massey Hall, released in 1971. In addition, Daffodil Records was the first independent Canadian label to be distributed under its own name in international markets. Through a 1971 agreement with Festival Records, Daffodil was distributed under its own name in Australia and New Zealand.

Shortly after concluding its 1978 distribution agreement with Capitol/EMI Records, the company ceased operations as an independent entity.
